= 1957–58 Australia rugby union tour of Britain, Ireland and France =

Summary
P	W	D	L
Total
36	17	3	16
Test match
5	0	0	5
Opponent
P	W	D	L
Wales
1	0	0	1
Ireland
1	0	0	1
England
1	0	0	1
Scotland
1	0	0	1
France
1	0	0	1

Between late 1957 and March 1958 the Australia national rugby union team – the Wallabies – conducted a world tour encompassing Britain, Ireland, France and Canada on which they played five Tests and thirty-one minor tour matches. The Wallabies won 17, lost 16 and drew three of their games in total. They lost all five Tests of the tour.

== The squad's leadership ==
Versatile back Dick Tooth had made 10 Test appearances for Australia before the tour and had captained the Wallabies well in two 1957 Tests against the All Blacks. Howell expresses a view that it was inexplicable that Tooth was not selected for the tour and partially blames this as cause of the disappointing tour result. However Howell writes that Bob Davidson possessed outstanding qualities to make him a natural touring captain. He was a born leader of men, was immensely popular, he met people well, was highly intelligent and spoke well in public. He played in 32 of the 41 tour games and did everything in his power to make the tour a success.

Veteran second-rower Alan Cameron had captained the Wallabies in 18 matches in 1955 and 1956 but was no longer supreme in his position nor guaranteed of Test selection. However he made a superb contribution to the tour playing in 22 matches including one Test and captained the side in seven mid-week matches

As per tradition, Assistant Manager Dave Cowper assumed the coaching duties. Howell writes that in spite of the mounting losses, Cowper "ever the gentleman, never criticised the players, even when he had every right to....he personified the true amateur, playing always to the rules with a strict code of ethics" Squad member Nicholas Shehadie was less complimentary in his published recollections suggesting Cowper had limited imagination as a coach with "our training devoid of variety which made it very tedious."

== Tour details ==
The squad was on tour for eight months in total and travelled to England by ship. Shehadie reports that the team issue consisted of " two blazers, a pair of grey slacks, four green ties with a hand-painted wallaby on each, a heavy pullover and a track suit. In addition, each player received one pair of boots – with another pair to be issued in England – sandshoes for training on the ship, a heavy woollen scarf and tablets to counteract sea-sickness, Vitamin C tablets to counteract colds in Britain and a packet of tranquiliser tablets to be used at the player's own discretion"' He recalls that the squad's pocket money was 10s a day, up from 5s a decade before.

== Matches of the Tour ==
Scores and results list Australia's points tally first.

	Date	Opponent	Location	Result	Score
1	6 November	(England) Southern Counties	Hove	Won	29–5
2	10 November	(England) Oxford University RFC	Iffley Road, Oxford	Lost	6–12
3	13 November	(England) Cambridge University R.U.F.C.	Grange Road, Cambridge	Lost	3–13
4	16 November	(England) London Counties	Twickenham	Draw	9–9
5	20 November	(Wales) Pontypool & Cross Keys	Pontypool Park, Pontypool	Won	14–6
6	23 November	(Wales) Newport	Rodney Parade, Newport	Lost	0–11
7	27 November	Leinster	Lansdowne Road, Dublin	Won	10–8
8	30 November	Ulster	Ravenhill, Belfast	Won	9–0
9	4 December	(Scotland) Glasgow - Edinburgh	Old Anniesland, Glasgow	Won	9–3
10	7 December	South of Scotland	Mansfield Park, Hawick	Won	12–6
11	10 December	(Wales) Llanelli	Stradey Park, Llanelli	Won	9–5
12	14 December	(Wales) Cardiff	Cardiff Arms Park, Cardiff	Lost	11–14
13	18 December	(England) Western Counties	Bristol	Lost	8–9
14	21 December	(England) Leicestershire & East Midlands	Welford Road Leicester	Won	18–3
15	26 December	(United Kingdom) Combined Services	Twickenham	Won	16–11
17	28 December	(Wales) Aberavon & Neath	Talbot Athletic Ground, Port Talbot	Won	5–3
18	4 January	Wales	Cardiff Arms Park	Lost	3–9
19	8 January	(Wales) Abertillery & Ebbw Vale	The Park, Abertillery	Lost	5–6
20	11 January	(Wales) Swansea	St Helen's Ground, Swansea	Won	12–6
21	18 January	Ireland	Lansdowne Road	Lost	6–9
22	21 January	Munster	Thomond Park, Limerick	Draw	3–3
23	25 January	(England) South West Counties	Home Park, Plymouth	Drew	3–3
24	28 January	(England) South East Counties	Portsmouth	Won	6–0
25	1 February	England	Twickenham Stadium	Lost	6–9
26	5 February	(England) North Eastern Counties	County Ground, Gosforth	Won	10–0
27	8 February	(England) North Western Counties	County Ground, Blundellsands	lost	3–6
28	11 February	North of Scotland (Note: Team billed as North of Scotland was a de facto combined North and Midlands side)	Aberdeen	Won	6–3
29	15 February	Scotland	Murrayfield Stadium	Lost	8–12
30	19 February	(England) Midland Counties	Highfield Road, Coventry	Lost	3–8
31	22 February	Barbarians	Cardiff Arms Park, Cardiff	Lost	6–11
32	9 March	France	Stade de Colombes	Lost	0–19
33	15 March	(Canada) British Columbia	Vancouver	Lost	3–15
34	20 March	(Canada) University of British Columbia	Vancouver	Won	31–6

== Test matches ==
=== Wales ===
4 January 1958

Wales	9–3	Australia
(3 −1t) Collins (3 – 1pg) TJ Davies (3 – 1dg) James		Miller (3 – 1t)

Cardiff Arms Park, Cardiff
Attendance: 55,000
Referee: AI Dickie (Scotland)

AUSTRALIA: Terry Curley, Roderick Phelps, Kenneth Donald, Jim Lenehan, Jack Potts, Arthur Summons, Des Connor, Nicholas Shehadie, Norman Hughes, Peter Fenwicke, Tony Miller, Dave Emanuel, John Thornett, James Brown, Robert Davidson (captain)

WALES: Terry Davies, John Collins, Gordon Wells, Cyril Davies, Ray Williams, Carwyn James, Wynne Evans, Don Devereux, Bryn Meredith, Ray Prosser, Rhys Williams, Roddy Evans, Robin Davies, Clem Thomas (captain), John Faull

=== Ireland ===
18 January 1958

Ireland	9–6	Australia
Dawson (3 – 1t); Henderson (3 – 1t); Smith (3 – 1pg)		Phelps (3 – 1t); Summons (3 – 1t)

Lansdowne Road, Dublin
Attendance: 33,000
Referee: WJ Evans (Wales)

Shehadie writes in his memoirs that his response to Noel Murphy continually blocking his vision in the scrum was to deal him a punch in an ensuing scrum. He recalls that the Lansdowne Rd crowd booed the Australian team and that press afterwards singled out Shehadie for his brutal play. He suggests that Dave Cowper then determined to make an example of him and true to his word did not select him in another Test of the tour. It was therefore Shehadie's last Test match, as it would also be for Australia's other forward veteran Alan Cameron.

AUSTRALIA: Terry Curley, Kenneth Donald, Saxon White, Jack Potts, Roderick Phelps, Arthur Summons, Des Connor, Nicholas Shehadie, James Brown, Robert Davidson (captain), Alan Cameron, Dave Emanuel, John Thornett Norman Hughes, Peter Fenwicke

IRELAND: Paddy Berkery, Tony O'Reilly, Noel Henderson (c), Dave Hewitt, Cecil Pedlow, Jackie Kyle, Andy Mulligan, Patrick O'Donoghue, Ronnie Dawson, Gordon Wood, James Stevenson, Bill Mulcahy, James Donaldson, Noel Murphy, James Kavanagh, Alan Cameron

=== England ===
1 February 1958

England	9–6	Australia
(3 – 1t) Phillips (3 – 1t) Jackson (3 – 1pg) Hetherington		Curley (3 – 1fg); Lenehan (3 – 1pg)

Twickenham, London
Attendance: 60,000
Referee: RC Williams (Ireland)

This was the day Twickenham jeered a sound at the august ground. But when Jim Lenehan tackled Phil Horrocks-Taylor late and so heavily that he was taken off the field, the crowd were annoyed. Every time Lenehan touched the ball, the crowd booed.

The scores were 3–0 at half time, but soon Malcolm Phillips scored a great try and then Terry Curley gave the Wallabies the lead with a drop goal. When injury time came the score was 6-all. Then came the only try of the match by brilliant Peter Jackson. Jackson out on the wing, got a pass on the Wallaby 25. He was not the fastest of wings – but he was deceptive and knew sidestep, swerve and hand-off, and used them as deadly weapons. He swerved away from Rod Phelps and handed him off. He moved to cut in, plonking Terry Curley onto the wrong foot as he beat him on the outside. Phelps was gaining, the line was approaching, Phelps was faster and Jackson dived with Phelps on his back.

It was England's first post-war Test victory over one of the three Southern powers.

AUSTRALIA: Terry Curley, Rod Phelps, Ken Donald, Jim Lenehan, Saxon White, Arthur Summons, Des Connor, Kevin Ryan, Mac Hughes, Peter Fenwicke, Tony Miller, Dave Emanuel, Geoffrey Vaughan, James Brown, Robert Davidson (captain)

ENGLAND: Jim Hetherington, Peter Jackson, Malcolm Phillips, Jeff Butterfield, Peter Thompson, Phil Horrocks-Taylor, Dickie Jeeps, Alan Ashcroft, Ronald Syrett, Peter Robbins, David Marques, John Currie, Ron Jacobs, Eric Evans (captain), George Hastings

=== Scotland ===
15 February 1958

Scotland	12–8	Australia
Stevenson (3 – 1t); Weatherstone (3 – 1t); Smith (6 – 2pg)		Donald (3 – 1t); Thornett (3 – 1t); Lenehan (2 – 1g)

Murrayfield, Edinburgh
Attendance: 45,000
Referee: RC Williams (Ireland)

AUSTRALIA: Terry Curley, Kenneth Donald, Jim Lenehan, Saxon White, Roderick Phelps, Arthur Summons, Des Connor, Geoffrey Vaughan, James Brown, Robert Davidson (captain), Tony Miller, Dave Emanuel, Eddie Purkiss, John Thornett, Norman Hughes

SCOTLAND: Robin Chisholm, Arthur Smith (captain), George Stevenson, James Docherty, Thomas Weatherstone, Gordon Waddell, Tremayne Rodd, Hugh McLeod, Norman Bruce, Tom Elliot, Malcolm Swan, Hamish Kemp, Ken Smith, Adam Robson, Jim Greenwood

=== France ===
9 March 1958

France	19–0	Australia
(3 −1t) Crauste (3 −1t) Quaglio (3 −1t) Rancoule (3 – 1dg) Prat (7 – 2,g1dg) Labazuy

Stade de Colombes, Paris
Attendance: 14,236
Referee: NM Parkes (England)

AUSTRALIA: Terry Curley, Alan Morton, Jim Lenehan, Roderick Phelps, Otto Fox, Ron Harvey, Des Connor, Geoffrey Vaughan, James Brown, Robert Davidson (captain), Tony Miller, Dave Emanuel, Ken Yanz, John Thornett, Norman Hughes

FRANCE: Michel Vannier, Henri Rancoule, Maurice Prat, Roger Martine, Pierre Tarricq, Antoine Labazuy, Pierre Lacroix, Aldo Quaglio, Robert Vigier, Alfred Roques, Lucien Mias, Michel Celaya (captain), Michel Crauste, Henri Domec, Jean Barthe

== Touring party ==
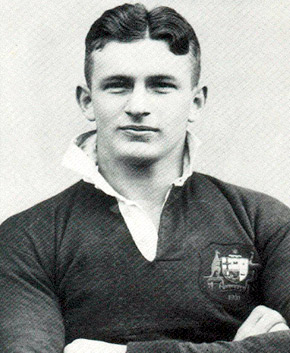
Dave Cowper

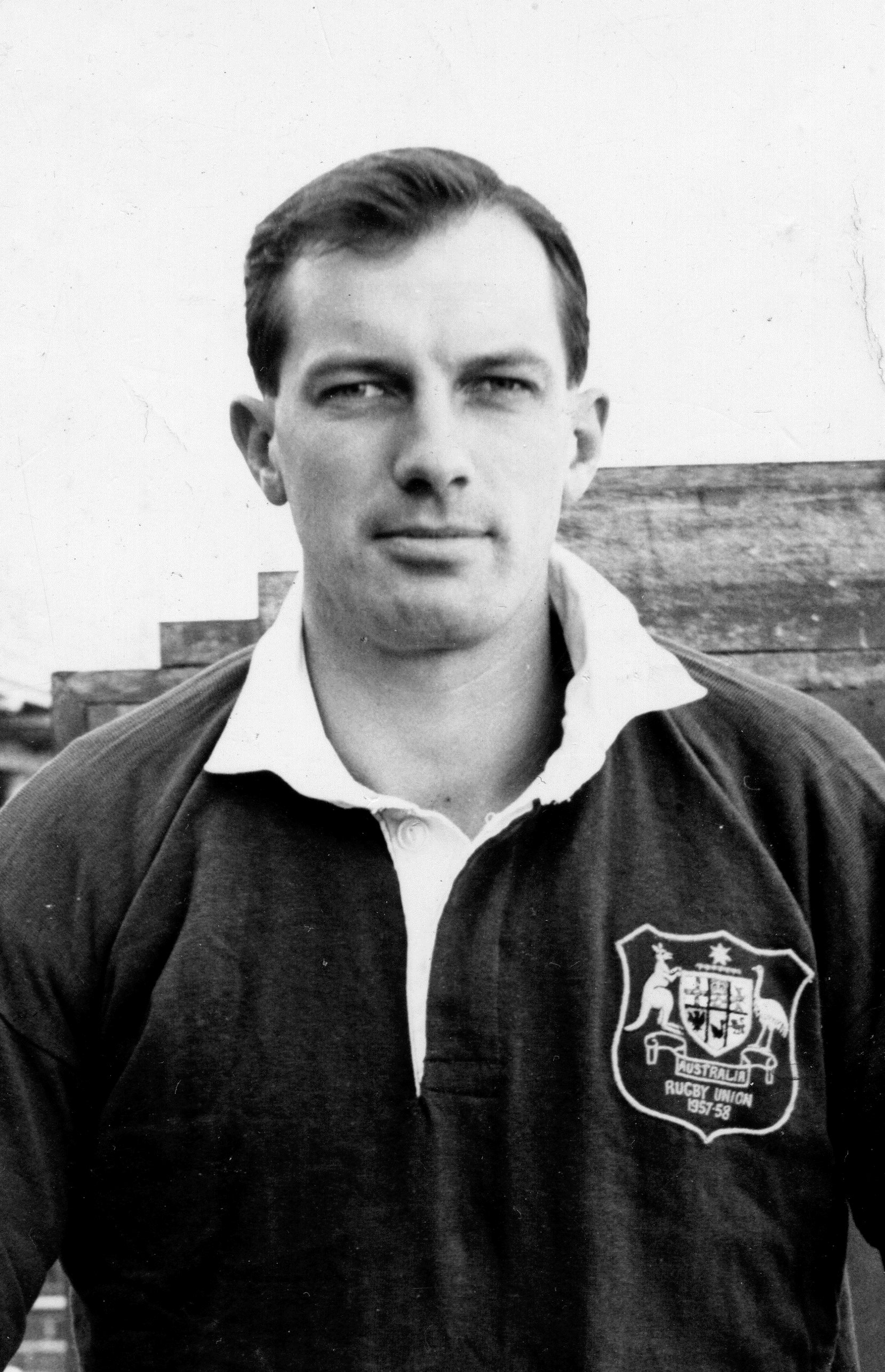
Saxon White

Nicholas Shehadie

- Manager: Terry McLenaughan
- Assistant manager (Coach): Dave Cowper
- Captain: Bob Davidson
- Vice-captain: Alan Cameron

=== Squad ===
Name	Tests	Club	Career caps	Tour Apps	Position	Pts
Terry Curley	5	Newcastle Wanderers		34	Full back	3
Ken Donald	4	Queensland University	9		Three-quarter	33
Alan Morton	1	Randwick	11		Three-quarter	
Rod Phelps	5	Northern Suburbs			Three-quarter	3
Saxon White	3	Sydney University			Three-quarter	
Jack Potts	2	Sydney University			Three-quarter	0
Jim Lenehan	4	Wagga Wagga	24	32	Three-quarter	114
Otto Fox	1	St George	1	16	Three-quarter	
Graham Bailey	0			17	Three-quarter	
Ron Harvey	1	Newcastle Waratahs			Half-back	
Arthur Summons	4	Gordon RFC	10		Half-back	
Des Connor	5	Brisbane Brothers	27	27	Half-back	
Don Logan	1	Gordon RFC	1		Half-back	
Bob Davidson (c)	5	Gordon RFC	13	32	Forward	
Kevin Ryan	1	Brisbane Brothers	5		Forward	0
Alan Cameron	1	St George RUFC	20	22	Forward	
John Thornett	4	Sydney University	37	18	Forward	
Dave Emanuel	5	Eastern Suburbs			Forward	0
Norman Hughes	5	Sydney University	14		Forward	0
Geoffrey Vaughan	3	Melbourne University Rugby Union	6		Forward	
Peter Fenwicke	2	Walcha	6	19	Forward	
Ron Meadows	0	Newcastle Wanderers			Forward	
Jim Brown	5	Randwick	9	24	Forward	
Nicholas Shehadie	2	Randwick	30	24	Forward	
Tony Miller	4	Manly RUFC	41		Forward	
Ken Yanz	1	Gordon RFC	1		Forward	
Edwin Purkiss	1	Newcastle Wanderers	3		Forward	
Bill Gunther	0	Molong		15	Forward	
Stuart Scotts		Eastern Suburbs			Forward	
Jim Phipps			11	7	Three-quarter	

The team's most experienced centre three quarter Jim Phipps ( 11 caps prior to tour) played 7 of the first 9 games but broke his leg against Glasgow and Edinburgh and did not play again on tour.

The Wallabies played a match in Perth on the way to England during which lock Stuart Scotts broke a wrist and feared he would be left at home. Management decided the six weeks boat trip would give him sufficient time to recover, a decision vindicated by his playing several mid- week games during the tour.

== Sources ==
=== Bibliography ===
- Howell, Max (2005) Born to Lead – Wallaby Test Captains, Celebrity Books, Auckland NZ
- Shehadie, Nicholas (2003) A Life Worth Living, Simon & Schuster Australia

=== Online references ===
Jackson's try from Planet-Rugby.com
