= Graham Bailey (rugby union) =

Australian rugby union player (born 1936)

- Full name: Graham Douglas Bailey
- Born: 31 August 1936 (age 90) Molong, NSW, Australia
- Height: 183 cm (6 ft 0 in)
- Weight: 85 kg (187 lb)
- School: The Armidale School

Rugby union career
- Position: Centre
Provincial / State sides
Years	Team	Apps	(Points)
- New South Wales
International career
Years	Team	Apps	(Points)
1957–58	Australia		

Graham Douglas Bailey (born 31 August 1936) is an Australian former international rugby union player.

Bailey was born in the New South Wales town of Molong and made his representative debut in 1956 playing for Central West in the Country Week carnival. By the season's end, the Armidale School-educated centre had made his way into the New South Wales side, starring with two tries in a win over Queensland at North Sydney Oval.

In 1957, Bailey gained selection to the Wallabies squad for the 1957–58 tour of Britain, Ireland and France, with Jim Phipps, Jack Potts and Saxon White the other centres picked. He was used regularly throughout the tour, making 17 uncapped appearances, but did not feature in any of the Test matches.

== See also ==
- List of Australia national rugby union players
