= Cornelsen =

Cornelsen is a surname. Notable people with the surname include:

- Brad Cornelsen, American football coach and player
- Greg Cornelsen (born 1952), Australian rugby union footballer
- Jack Cornelsen (born 1994), Australian-born Japanese rugby union player
