= Keith Cross =

- Full name: Keith Austin Cross
- Born: 8 June 1928 Bondi, NSW, Australia
- Died: 29 January 2011 (aged 82) Elizabeth Bay, NSW, Australia

Rugby union career
- Position: Flanker / No. 8
International career
Years	Team	Apps	(Points)
1949–57	Australia	19	(15)

Keith Austin Cross (8 June 1928 — 29 January 2011) was an Australian rugby union international.

Educated at Sydney Boys High School, Cross was a 1st XV player, ran in the school relay team, won a Combined High Schools breaststroke swimming title and rowed in the Head of the River race as a member of the eights. He played his rugby as a back row forward and made his Randwick first-grade debut in 1947.

Cross, capped 19 times, debuted for the Wallabies in 1949 against New Zealand Māori at the Sydney Cricket Ground. He was part of the successful 1949 tour of New Zealand, where he played in both Test wins over the All Blacks, to secure the Bledisloe Cup. A regular fixture in the Wallabies team until 1957, Cross was a controversial omission from the 1957–58 tour of Britain, Ireland and France, with the uncapped Eddie Purkiss preferred.

== See also ==
- List of Australia national rugby union players
