= Stuart Scotts =

- Full name: Stuart Russell Scotts
- Born: 26 February 1934 Sydney, NSW, Australia
- Died: 9 July 2020 (aged 86)
- School: Scots College, Sydney
- Notable relative: Colin Scotts (nephew)

Rugby union career
- Position: Flanker / Lock
International career
Years	Team	Apps	(Points)
1957–58	Australia		

Stuart Russell Scotts (26 February 1934 – 9 July 2020) was an Australian international rugby union player.

Scotts was born in Sydney and educated at Scots College.

A flanker and lock, Scotts was 18 on his first-grade debut with Eastern Suburbs and formed a successful forward partnership with Dave Emanuel. Both won Wallabies call ups for the 1957–58 tour of Britain, Ireland and France, despite Scotts having no prior state representative experience. He began the tour with a wrist fracture, stemming from a training drill in Fremantle, then injured his knee against Leinster and later had to undergo a hernia operation in London, all of which contributed to him making only three uncapped appearances. On the return home, the team stopped over in North America for a series of matches and Scotts recovered sufficiently to participate in a further three fixtures.

Scotts is the uncle of former NFL football player Colin Scotts.

== See also ==
- List of Australia national rugby union players
