= Peter Phipps =

Peter Phipps may refer to:

- Peter Phipps (admiral) (1916–1999), Royal New Zealand Navy officer
- Peter Phipps (rugby union), Australian international rugby union player
- Peter J. Phipps (born 1973), American judge
- Pete Phipps (born 1951), drummer, singer and songwriter
