= Homebush Boys High School =

Location
- Bridge Road; Homebush, New South Wales, 2140; Australia; 33°51′58″S 151°4′37″E

Information
- Type: Public, secondary, single-sex, day school
- Motto: Latin: Recte et Fortiter (Latin for Upright and strong)
- Established: 1936
- Principal: Kevin Elgood
- Enrolment: ~1,208 (7–12)
- Campus: Suburban
- Colours: Maroon and sky blue
- Sister school: Strathfield Girls High School
- Website: homebushbo-h.schools.nsw.gov.au

Homebush Boys High School, founded in 1936, is a public high school for boys. It is in Homebush, in Sydney, New South Wales, Australia.

Formerly a selective high school, in 2006 Homebush Boys was regarded as one of the academically best-performing comprehensive schools, and has, in the past, been ranked above selective schools on the Higher School Certificate results.

The school has an enrolment of approximately 1208 students.

== Notable alumni ==
=== Entrepreneurial ===
- John Symond AM – Businessman; chief executive "Aussie Home Loans",

=== Science and education ===
- Lionel Gilbert OAM – author and historian specializing in natural, applied, and local history.
- Stephen Leeder – Medical scientist; Former dean of Medicine at the University of Sydney (1996–2002)
- Geoffrey Vaughan – Emeritus professor of pharmaceutical chemistry and Deputy Vice-Chancellor (1990–1992) of Monash University formerly Australian Rugby Union representative player

=== Entertainment and the arts ===
- Neil Armfield – Film and theatre director
- Paul Furniss – Jazz musician
- Alex Hood – Renowned entertainer, writer, actor and folk singer.

=== Politics and law ===
- John Coates – Lawyer and businessman; president of the Australian Olympic Committee, member of the International Olympic Committee
- Bob Debus – Former NSW attorney-general and environment minister; Former federal home-affairs minister
- Jim Lloyd – former federal government minister

=== Sport ===
- Rodney Blake – Rugby union player for Australia and Queensland Reds
- Jonah Bolden (born 1996) – basketball player
- Tim Brasher – Former Balmain Tigers NSWRL Player
- Gordon Bray – Sports commentator, journalist and writer.
- Tony Ford – Rugby league fullback with Western Suburbs DRLFC
- Bob Howe – tennis player who won five doubles Grand Slam and four mixed doubles Grand Slam titles.
- Phillip Hughes – NSW and Australian cricketer.
- Mitchell Starc – NSW and Australian cricketer
- Arthur Summons – Rugby union and rugby league player; international representative in both codes and former captain Western Suburbs DRLFC and Australian rugby league teams
- Don Talbot – Swimming coach
- Peter Vassella – Olympian (1964), sprinter
- Saxon White – former rugby union international (Wallaby).
- Jonah Bolden – Professional NBA basketball player

Other

- Andrew Chan (1984–2015) – drug trafficker who was sentenced to death in 2015

== Notable former staff ==
- Dave Anderson – Australian Olympic oarsman in 1952 and 1956. Rowed King's Cup 1950, 1951, 1952, 1953, 1954, 1955, 1956, 1957; Henley 1952; New Zealand 1951; and was in winning coxed-fours crew at Empire Games, 1954
- Darrel Chapman – Representative rugby league player (Australia and NSW), team captain of South Sydney between 1961 and 1964, subsequently lectured in sports sciences at Southern Cross University taught physical education 1963.
- Vincent Durick – Maths teacher; MLA for Lakemba, 1964–84, deceased 1996.
- Peter Philpott – English/history teacher; New South Wales and Australian cricketer

== Principals ==
No.	Portrait	Name	Length
1		William Roberts	1936–1945
2		K. Hannay	1945–1946 (Acting)
3		Andrew D. Watson	1946–1949
4		Robert A. Golding	1950–1958
5		Richard T. W. Jane	1959–1964
6		Kevin J. Myers	1965–1973
7		J. R. Kelly	1974–1975
8		W. E. Barry	1976–1978
9		Douglas Thornton	1979–1984
10		Malcolm Brown	1985–1990
11		Brian Greene	1991–1998
12		Ian Patterson	1999–2009
13		Tim Jurd	2010–
14		John G. Kennedy	

== See also ==
- List of Government schools in New South Wales
