= 1973 Tonga rugby union tour of Australia and Fiji =

The 1973 Tonga rugby union tour of Australia and Fiji involved Tonga's national rugby union team playing two test matches in Australia and one test in Fiji. The tour also included lower level games that took place in Australia. Tonga's victory over Australia in the second test has been described as the biggest upset in international rugby.

== Australia ==
=== First test ===
The first test was played at the Sydney Cricket Ground on 23 June 1973. Coached by Bob Templeton, Australia scored five tries, while Tonga scored two. The final score was 30-12. Australia scored one point less than their highest test result; 31-6 against New Zealand in 1936.

Making their debut for Australia were Ron Graham as prop, Garrick Fay in the second-row and Mark Loane at number eight. At 18 years of age, Loane was the youngest Wallaby test player since Bill Cerutti in 1928. Fay became the first forward in Australian test history to kick a drop goal, and was admonished by the coach for doing so.

Australia dominated the line-outs and rucks. Tonga replied from Australia's misplaced kicks. Tonga displayed good ball-handling skills and fierce tackling. Tongan winger Isikeli Vave made the costly error of being pushed over the dead-ball line just as he was about to casually score a try.

=== Second test ===
The second test was played at Ballymore Stadium in Brisbane on 30 June 1973. Tonga won the game 16-11, having overtaken Australia's lead of 11-8 with ten minutes remaining. Chris Carberry made his Wallaby debut at hooker and Eric Tindall at halfback. With Tonga scoring twice on the blind side from scrums, Mark Loane's performance was criticised. Loane remarked that the loss was "the absolute rock bottom of Australian rugby". The result has been described as "iconic" for Tonga, "the biggest upset in international rugby", and the worst moment in Australian rugby.

== Fiji ==
On 11 July 1973 Tonga were defeated by Fiji 24 points to 12 at the National Stadium in Fiji's capital Suva.
