= Bill Gunther =

Australian rugby union international

- Full name: William John Gunther
- Born: 7 November 1931 Bathurst, NSW, Australia
- Died: 15 June 2009 (aged 77) Orange, NSW, Australia
- Notable relative: Bill Calcraft (nephew)

Rugby union career
- Position: Flanker
International career
Years	Team	Apps	(Points)
1957	Australia	1	(0)

William John Gunther (7 November 1931 — 15 June 2009) was an Australian rugby union international.

A native of Bathurst, Gunther attended St Joseph's College, Hunters Hill and Wagga Wagga Agricultural College.

Gunther was a strong tackling flanker and played his rugby in country New South Wales, much of it with Molong. He gained his first Wallabies call up in 1957 for a home series against the All Blacks. After Chilla Wilson was preferred for the 1st Test, selectors made four changes up front for the 2nd Test in Brisbane, with Gunther earning his solitary Wallabies cap. He made 15 uncapped appearances on the 1957–58 tour of Britain, Ireland and France.

== See also ==
- List of Australia national rugby union players
