= Neill Latimer =

Australian rugby union international

- Full name: Neill Buchanan Latimer
- Born: 5 September 1930 Brisbane, Australia
- Died: 2 February 2012 (aged 81)
- Height: 6 ft 4 in (193 cm)

Rugby union career
- Position: Lock
International career
Years	Team	Apps	(Points)
1957	Australia	1	(0)

Neill Buchanan Latimer (5 September 1930 — 2 February 2012) was an Australian rugby union international.

Educated at Knox Grammar School, Latimer was a towering lock and played his rugby for Sydney club Gordon.

Latimer's early career in first-grade rugby was limited due to his work at a remote cattle station in Queensland, missing the entire 1955 and 1956 seasons for Gordon. As such it was a surprise when he received a call up by the Wallabies in 1957 for a home series against the All Blacks, with his only previous representative experience being for the City seconds. He was capped in the 2nd Test in Brisbane as a replacement for injured captain Alan Cameron.

== See also ==
- List of Australia national rugby union players
