= Ken Donald =

Ken Donald AO
- Born: 9 August 1936 (age 90); Ipswich, Queensland, Australia
- Education: University of Queensland (PhD, 1973)
- Occupations: pathologist and academic
- Known for: Working in pathology, preventative medicine, veteran's health and AIDS control

Rugby union career
- Position: wing
Provincial / State sides
Years	Team	Apps	(Points)
1957	Queensland	unknown	(unknown)
International career
Years	Team	Apps	(Points)
1957-1959	Australia	10	(21)
- Awards: Queensland Great (2012)

Kenneth John Donald AO (born 9 August 1936) is an Australian pathologist, academic and former rugby union player.

Donald played ten test matches for the Wallabies and was part of the 1957–58 Australia rugby union tour of Britain, Ireland and France. He was later appointed as the team manager of the Wallabies from 1979 to 1981.

He is perhaps equally known for his extensive medical career, having been appointed to a number of senior positions throughout his career including Director of Pathology at the Royal Brisbane Hospital, General Manager of the John Hunter Hospital, Director of Medical Services at the Royal Darwin Hospital and as Deputy Director-General of Health in Queensland.

Among his contributions to the medical field, Donald has been praised for his work in controlling AIDS in Australia and for his work pertaining to veteran's health.

== Early life ==
Donald was born in Ipswich, Queensland where he attended the Ipswich Grammar School, of which he was school captain. After graduating in 1955, Donald began studying medicine at the University of Queensland.

== Sporting career ==
While at Ipswich Grammar School, Donald proved to be talented at athletics, winning the school's Open 100 yard dash in 1954 and the Open 220 yard dash in 1955. He progressed to the Australian Open 100-yard-dash which was won by Hector Hogan.

Donald made his representative rugby union debut playing in the Queensland team against New South Wales in 1957.

Having since been described as a "lightning fast, diminutive winger", Donald showed potential early on and was selected to play for the Wallabies when they played New Zealand at the Sydney Cricket Ground during their 1957 tour. His debut was not without incident, breaking three metacarpal bones in his right hand during a Don Clarke tackle. Despite the injury, Donald continued to play the remainder of the match.

Including his games with Queensland, Donald played 15 representative rugby union matches throughout his career including all four tests during the 1957-58 Australia rugby union tour of Britain, Ireland and France. He scored his first try in the game against Scotland in Murrayfield on 15 February 1958.

Deciding to retire to focus on his medical career, Donald's final match with the Wallabies was on the second test against the British Isles in 1959. However, at an Australian Rugby Union Council meeting in October 1978, Donald was appointed as Australia's team manager with David Brockhoff re-appointed as coach. Donald served as the team's manager until 1981.

== Medical career ==
Donald graduated from the University of Queensland with a Bachelor of Medicine, Bachelor of Surgery in 1962. In 1973, he obtained his PhD in immunology.

Initially working as a pathologist, Donald served as the director of pathology at the Royal Brisbane Hospital and professor of anatomical pathology at the University of Australia.

After his stint as the Wallabies team manager, Donald was appointed as the deputy director-general of health in Queensland from 1981 to 1989.

Donald was appointed as the chairman of the drug testing committee for the 1982 Commonwealth Games where he led a team of 140 people who conducted compulsory steroid tests on all competitors across the ten venues. He also authored the book The Doping Game which was published in 1983.

As Deputy Director-General of Queensland Health, Donald chaired the 1985 Queensland inquiry into racehorse caffeine doping. This ultimately proved to be embarrassing for the Queensland Government and the Queensland Turf Club when it was found the sticks used in the testing to detect caffeine actually contained caffeine themselves. More than 150 racehorses had tested positive to caffeine with horse trainers and owners having received disqualifications and fines. After months of investigations which saw Donald fly to London and Hong Kong to consult experts on horse doping, he and Minister for Racing Russ Hinze held a press conference on 16 May 1985 to explain the mistake.

In 1988, Donald was appointed as the chairperson of the Community Taskforce on AIDS Control in Queensland which was established to report to the Queensland Cabinet with details relating to prevention and management of HIV/AIDS in Queensland as well as its potential social and economic impacts.

In 1992, Donald was appointed as the head of University of Queensland's Department of Social and Preventative Medicine and in 2000 was appointed as the head of the university's Graduate School of Medicine.

The Queensland Government asked Donald in 2007 to investigate why there was a list of 140,000 patients waiting to see specialists. Donald's findings discovered the status of some patients were listed as "never to be seen" which health minister Stephen Robertson described as "unacceptable".

Also in 2007, Donald was appointed as the chairman of OBJ Ltd's transdermal vaccines subsidiary OBJTV to help oversee the development of the company's ability to administer vaccines to patients through the skin.

As of 2011, Donald's academic work consisted of more than 90 published journal articles and textbooks. As of 2013, Donald was the professor of assessment and evaluation at the Griffith University's School of Medicine.

Donald has also served as the president of the Australian Cancer Society and was the inaugural chair of the Repatriation Medical Authority.

== Honours ==
In the 2007 Queen's Birthday Honours, Donald was made an Officer of the Order of Australia in recognition of his service to the field of medicine as an academic and administrator, specifically his contributions to pathology and community health.

Donald was named as a Queensland Great in 2012.

For his role in helping establish the Repatriation Medical Authority, the Returned and Services League of Australia made Donald an honorary life member.
