= Peter Woodruff =

England international rugby union player

Peter Woodruff MBE
- Full name: Charles Garfield Woodruff
- Born: 30 October 1920 Newport, Wales
- Died: 1 November 2019 (aged 99) Leicester, England
- School: Newport High School

Rugby union career
- Position: Wing
International career
Years	Team	Apps	(Points)
1951	England	4	(0)

Charles Garfield Woodruff (30 October 1920 – 1 November 2019) was an English international rugby union player.

Born and raised in Newport, Wales, Woodruff was known as "Peter" to his family, but also went by the name "Charlie". He enlisted in the Royal Air Force after finishing school, reaching the rank of flight lieutenant. In World War II, Woodruff flew Dakotas during the Normandy landings that dropped paratroopers over France.

Woodruff got recruited by Harlequins while playing for the London Civil Service. He was a Welsh trialist, but gained his four international caps for England, featuring on the wing in all four of their 1951 Five Nations fixtures, before losing his place to Ted Woodward. Other than England, Woodruff also made representative appearances for Barbarians, Gloucestershire, Kent, London Counties and Western Counties. He last played for Harlequins at the age of 42.

== See also ==
- List of England national rugby union players
