= Ronald Meadows =

Australian rugby union international

- Full name: Ronald William Meadows
- Born: 2 December 1931 New Lambton, NSW, Australia
- Died: 26 September 1985 (aged 53) Newcastle, NSW, Australia
- School: North Sydney Boys High School
- University: University of Sydney
- Occupation: Civil engineer

Rugby union career
- Position: Hooker
International career
| Years | Team | Apps | (Points) |
| 1958 | Australia | 6 | (0) |

Ronald William Meadows (2 December 1931 — 26 September 1985) was an Australian rugby union international.

A native of Newcastle, Meadows attended North Sydney Boys High School, before undergoing studies at Duntroon Military College and the University of Sydney. He was a civil engineer by profession.

Meadows, nicknamed twinkletoes, was a hooker and played his rugby for Wanderers after returning to Newcastle in 1957. Following representative appearances for NSW Country, he made the Wallabies squad for the 1957–58 tour of Britain, Ireland and France, as an understudy to Jim Brown. He played in 19 uncapped matches on the tour. When New Zealand Māori toured Australia in 1958, Meadows was hooker for all three Tests, with Brown having recently retired. He was capped a further three times on the 1958 tour of New Zealand.

== See also ==
- List of Australia national rugby union players
