= New South Wales Teachers Federation =

Australian trade union

Federation
- New South Wales Teachers Federation
- Founded: 1919
- Headquarters: Surry Hills, Sydney
- Location: Australia
- Members: 66,000
- Affiliations: AEU, ACTU
- Website: www.nswtf.org.au

The New South Wales Teachers Federation is the registered trade union that covers New South Wales (NSW) public school teachers. The New South Wales Teachers Federation represents all teachers in NSW public pre-schools, infants, primary and secondary schools and TAFE institutes. Teachers working in public non-school based teaching service positions and corrective services are also covered by the Federation.

== About the union ==
The New South Wales Teachers Federation is affiliated to the Australian Education Union (AEU), the national union covering public school teachers in Australia and through that organisation to Education International and the Australian Council of Trade Unions. The New South Wales Teachers Federation is also affiliated to Unions New South Wales. The NSW Teachers Federation is not affiliated to any political party.

The Federation is based at Surry Hills, Sydney. The union also has regional offices in Bathurst, Dubbo, Lismore, Newcastle, Port Macquarie, Queanbeyan, Tamworth, Wagga Wagga and Wollongong.

The membership of the Federation includes about 47,000 full-time teachers, 15,000 temporary, casual and unemployed members, and 4,000 TAFE teachers. The total membership stands at about 66,000.

The Federation state council of the union consists of approximately 300 locally elected delegates. The union's annual conference consists of approximately 600 delegates. The Federation executive is elected by the state council.

The secretariat of the Federation is composed of about 50 officers who are elected by the council for a three-year term. They perform such jobs as organiser, industrial advocate, welfare officer and research officer, supporting the Federation's membership. There are also about 100 administrative support staff, located in Sydney and the regional offices.

The three Presidential officers – President, Deputy President, and Senior Vice-President – are elected by the whole membership every two years.

The Federation supports and advocates for a multiplicity of issues on behalf of teachers. It is responsible for negotiating the salaries and working conditions of its members with the New South Wales government and agencies. The union is committed to the values and interests of public education.

Stewart House and APHEDA are the official charities of the NEW South Wales Teachers Federation.

== History ==
=== Establishment and the early years ===
Throughout its history, Federation has campaigned long and hard on issues affecting public education, teachers' salaries and teachers' working conditions, those issues which are at the heart of teaching as a profession in New South Wales.

The first Annual Conference of Federation in 1919 had listed as part of the agenda "inadequacy of teachers' salaries, understaffing of schools, unwieldiness of classes, insufficiency of accommodation, conducting of classes in sheds, corridors and unsuitable rooms to the detriment of the health of teachers and pupils". Other matters included "unhealthy congestion of school population in overgrown suburban schools, as against decentralisation into schools with a maximum enrolment of one thousand, the high percentage of unclassified and insufficiently trained teachers, inadequacy of supervision by heads of departments owing to class duties and absence of schools for the mentally disabled". Throughout this century, Federation has continued to campaign on these issues.

In the years immediately following its establishment, Federation was concerned to increase its membership. In 1920 the membership of the Federation was 5,600 or 78% of the total membership of the Department of Education. In 1996 membership was about 64,000. This number included permanent full-time school, TAFE teachers, AMES teachers, part-time school, TAFE, AMES and casual teachers as well as those teachers in other associated groups.

It was not until 1937 that the first organiser was appointed, following an Annual Conference decision of 1936 that stated "we are firmly of the opinion that, for a really effective increase in membership, it is necessary that some person be employed for the whole of their time organising the schools". More officers were progressively appointed. There were 43 full-time administrative officers in 1996, who serviced the needs of the membership, campaigned and recruited.

In 1955 Doris Margaret Osborne pointed out that she had taken a higher position of deputy-headmistress at Fairfield Girls' High School but this was effectively a one way journey. She had a more senior position but women were not allowed to be in authority in a boys or mixed school. So if she wanted to return to her former school then she would need to take a demotion.

=== 1960s–present day ===
In 1961, 241,000 signatories for a National Education Petition were presented to the Prime Minister, Robert Menzies, calling for Commonwealth funding to state schools. This was the culmination of a long campaign begun in the 1940s, to encourage the Commonwealth Government to fund certain programs in State schools. This number of signatories was a record which was only broken in 1993 by a petition calling for private health insurance to be tax deductible.

Over the years to 1968, the Federation campaigned on the theme of "United Action", emphasising a community of interest between different sectors of the membership and the community. Political, industrial and professional issues concerning public education were given focus and emphasis. There were significant advances – in 1946, for example, there was a major salaries breakthrough for teachers which gave the first realistic salary increases since 1920 and set the standard for other professional workers. The average gain was over 100 pounds per year for men and 80 pounds for women.

The Federation made a major break with the past in 1968, its 50th anniversary, when the first statewide strike was called over the conditions in which teachers were working.

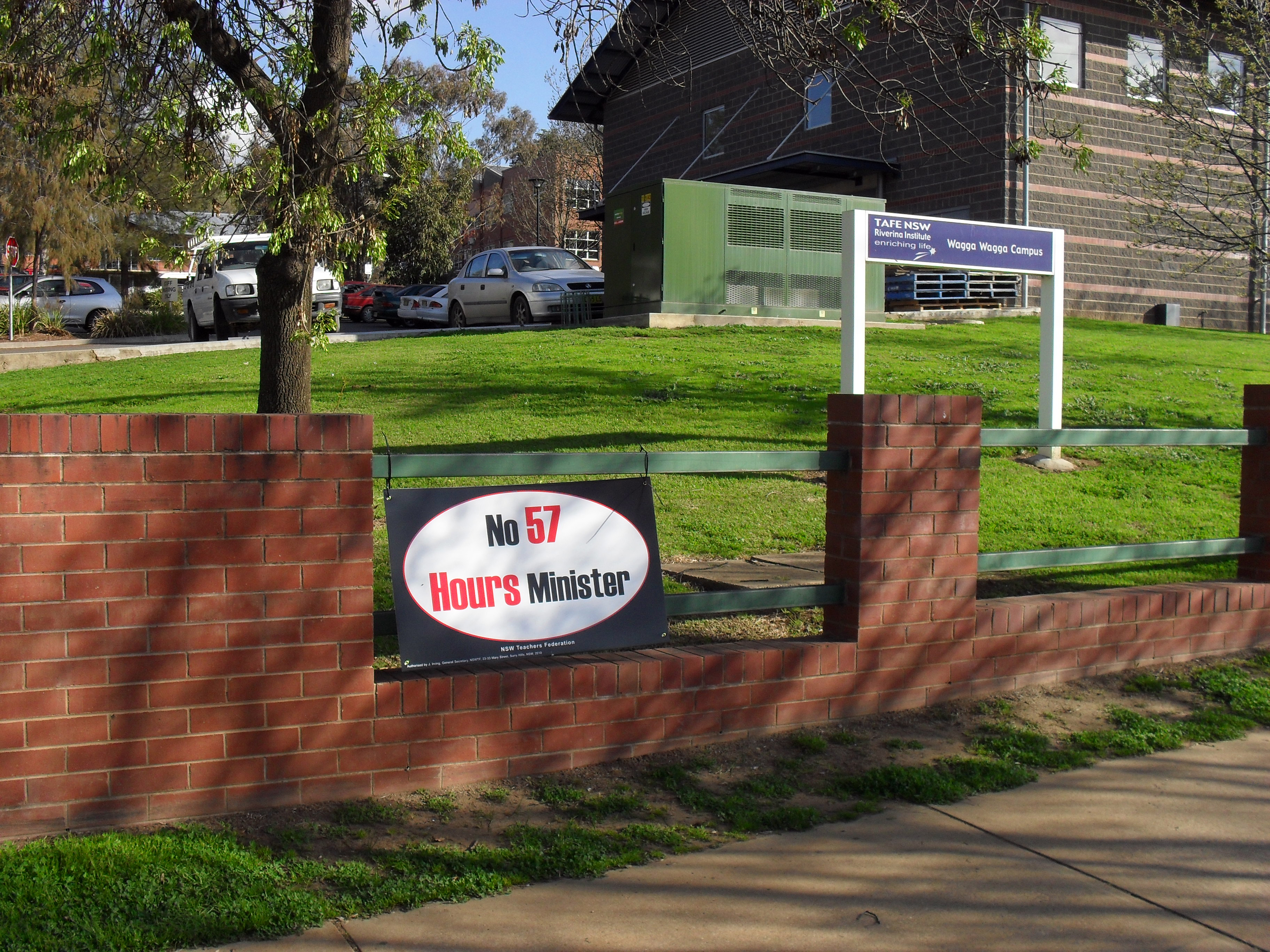
NSW Teachers Federation campaign.

Since the 1990s, the Federation has campaigned to support public education in the face of rapidly expanding government funding for private schools. In partnership with parents and principals, the Federation engages in political lobbying, promotion and advocacy in support of free, secular and universal public education for every child and young person.
