= Malcolm Swan =

Scotland international rugby union player

- Born: Malcolm William Swan; 4 December 1934 (age 91) Buenos Aires, Argentina
- School: Fettes College

Rugby union career
- Position: Lock
Amateur team(s)
Years	Team	Apps	(Points)
1957	Oxford University		
1958-	London Scottish		
Provincial / State sides
Years	Team	Apps	(Points)
1957	Whites Trial		
1957	Scotland Probables		
International career
Years	Team	Apps	(Points)
1958-59	Scotland	8	(0)

Malcolm Swan (born 4 December 1934) is a former Scotland international rugby union player.

== Rugby Union career ==
=== Amateur career ===
He went to Fettes College and captained their 1st XV rugby side. He left the college at Christmas 1954.

He played for Oxford University, gaining his blue in 1957.

He then moved on to London Scottish. He made his debut for Scottish against London Welsh in January 1958.

=== Provincial career ===
He played for Whites Trial against Blues Trial on 14 December 1957.

He was said to impress in that match and that aided his selection for Scotland Probables in the final trial match against Scotland Possibles on 28 December 1957.

=== International career ===
He was capped 8 times for Scotland between 1958–1959.
