= Strathfield Girls High School =

Coordinates: 33°52′S 151°05′E

- Strathfield, New South Wales; Australia

Information
- Type: Secondary Comprehensive, All Female
- Motto: Latin: Vitae lampada tradite Pass on the Torch of Life
- Established: 1953
- Principal: Mechel Pikoulas
- Grades: 7–12
- Colours: Navy blue, grey, white, light blue
- Brother school: Homebush Boys High School
- Website: strathfieg-h.schools.nsw.gov.au

Strathfield Girls High School is a single-sex comprehensive high school located in the municipality of Strathfield in Sydney, New South Wales, Australia, along with its brother school, Homebush Boys High School.

== History ==
The school opened as Homebush Intermediate High School, founded in 1926. In 1953, it was established as Strathfield Girls High School. In 1961 the women's right activist Doris Margaret Osborne became the headteacher. She left and in 1966 she was the first woman to lead a co-educational school in New South Wales. Strathfield Girls High School became known as a languages high school (due to the rich cultural diversity and backgrounds of its students) in 1990. Around 90% of its students are from non-English speaking backgrounds.

== Campus ==
The school has a "Hockey Field" and a "Quad" where students often gather during lunchtimes and breaks. There is a "Senior area" restricted to Year 12 students. A staff common room exists in the northern part of the campus. The school also has two out door tennis/basketbal/netball courts and one gym. The layout of the school is in a rectangular shape with all the buildings named according to the direction that they are facing, there is the North block, South block, East block, West block, West West block and Centre block.

== Extracurricular activities ==
Opportunities provided at the school include entering competitions in writing, public speaking, debating, art, drama, the sciences, mathematics, problem solving and mock trials. The school also conducts a school choir and orchestra, drama ensembles, Musicale, and Dance Night where students from Dance groups and students studying Dance as either an elective or for their HSC, exhibit what they have been working on throughout the year. There is also a Student Representative Council and many community service programs, such as a tree planting group who plant and look after trees in the school. Soccer, touch football, netball, cricket, basketball, badminton and softball are offered as sports.

== Notable alumni ==
- Janice Crosio

== See also ==
- List of Government schools in New South Wales
