= Gordon RFC =

Rugby union club, based on Sydney's North Shore

(Australia) Gordon Rugby Football Club
- Full name: Gordon Rugby Football Club
- Nickname(s): Highlanders, Stags
- Founded: 1936; 90 years ago
- Location: Chatswood, Sydney
- Ground: Chatswood Oval (Capacity: 9,000)
- President: Matt Glascott
- Coach: David Telfer
- Captain: Milan Basson
- League(s): Shute Shield, NSWRU
1st kit	2nd kit

Official website
- www.gordonrugby.com.au

Gordon Rugby Football Club is a rugby union club based on the North Shore of Sydney. The club, known as the Gordon Highlanders, plays out of Chatswood Oval and competes in the New South Wales Rugby Union grade competition.

== Club information ==
- Premiership Titles – Shute Shield: 9 (1949, 1952, 1956, 1958, 1976, 1993, 1995, 1998 & 2020)
- Club Championships: 13
- President: Matthew Glascott
- 1st Grade Head Coach: David Telfer
- 1st Colts Head Coach: Hunter Nicholas
- General Manager: Kingsley Seale
- Director of Rugby: Joshua Mitchell

For the 2026 season Gordon has appointed David Telfer as 1st Grade Head Coach with Hunter Nicholas as 1st Colts Head Coach.

== Current squad ==
The squad for the 2022 season

2022 Gordon Highlanders Rugby Squad		
**Props**: Rhys Brodie; Brandon Favaa Eli; (New Zealand) Tristan Fuli; Leigh Hughes; **Hookers**: (New Zealand) Will Bremner; (Australia) Mahe Vailanu; **Locks**: (Australia) Jack Margin; (Australia) Brendan Mitchell	**Back Row**: (Australia) Ola Tauelangi; (Australia) Jordan Goddard (C); (Australia) James Lough; (Australia) Francis Ieremia; Toby Parr (Club Captain); Brett Van Zyl; **Scrum-halves**: (Australia) Sam Babb; (Australia) Dylan Dowling; **Fly-halves**: (New Zealand) Reece McDonald; (Australia) Harrison Goddard; (Australia) Darcy Fitzgerald	**Centres**: (Australia) Dominic Easy; (Australia) Fraser Conway; (Australia) Connor Fahey; (Australia) Aiden Dowling; **Wingers**: (Australia) Mike Pavlakis; (New Zealand) Alesana Pohla; (Australia) Oliver Arcus; **Fullbacks**: Robbie McIntosh; (Australia) Ben Pollack
(c) Denotes team captain, **Bold** denotes internationally capped,

== International representatives ==
- (Australia) Frank O’Brien
- (Australia) Trevor Allan
- (Australia) Brian Piper
- (Australia) Arthur Tonkin
- (Australia) Bevan Wilson
- (Australia) Bob Davidson
- (Australia) Brian Johnson
- (Australia) Jim Phipps
- (Australia) Neill Latimer
- (Australia) Arthur Summons
- (Australia) Eddie Purkiss
- (Australia) Ken Yanz
- (Australia) Don Logan
- (Australia) David Shepherd
- (Australia) Des Carrick
- (Australia) Rod Batterham
- (Australia) Bruce Taafe
- (Australia) Peter Sullivan
- (Australia) David Burnet
- (Australia) Laurie Monaghan
- (Australia) John Ryan
- (Australia) Anthony (Tony) Daly
- (Australia) Steve Cutler
- (Australia) Mark Hartill
- (Australia) Anthony Ekert
- (Australia) Alistair Murdoch
- (Australia) Tim Wallace
- (Australia) Tony Dempsey
- (Australia) Andrew Blades
- (Australia) Cameron Blades
- (Australia) John Langford
- (Australia) Mitch Hardy
- (Australia) Stirling Mortlock
- (Australia) (Scotland) Jack Dempsey
- (United States) Mike Hercus
- (Scotland) Andrew Mower
- (New Zealand) Maurice Graham
- (Fiji) Epi Tuvunivono
- (Fiji) Seva Rokobaro
- (Fiji) Sisa Waqa
- (Hong Kong) Jack Parfitt
- (Australia) Dane Haylett-Petty
- (Australia) (Brazil) David Harvey

== Team geographical area ==
Based on Sydney's North Shore, the club is centred around Ku-ring-gai Council and is headquartered in Lindfield. The club, along with the Gordon Cricket Club in the Summer plays home games out of Chatswood Oval having played its early days at Roseville Chase Oval. The club's junior catchment area takes in the Ku-ring-gai and Lane Cove local government areas, as well as parts of Hornsby Shire and the City of Willoughby. The club's junior program is most notably strong in Ku-ring-gai with every suburb in the area except Gordon, Turramurra and Warrawee having a junior club specifically representing the postcode of that suburb. The club has 8 junior teams, in which 5 of the 8 teams are located in Ku-ring-gai council:

- Chatswood Junior Rugby Club
- Hornsby Junior Rugby Club
- Killara/West Pymble Junior Rugby Club
- Lane Cove Junior Rugby Club
- Lindfield Junior Rugby Club
- Roseville Junior Rugby Club
- St Ives Junior Rugby Club
- Wahroonga Junior Rugby Club

== Rugby Championships ==
- Club Championships: 13 – 1949 1952 1957 1962 1971 1974 1975 1976 1978 1990 1993 1998 2020
- 1st Grade Premierships: 9 – 1949, 1952, 1956, 1958, 1976, 1993, 1995, 1998 & 2020.
- 1st Grade Runners Up: 1950, 1955, 1957, 1967, 1969, 1972, 1980, 1992 & 2022.
- 2nd Grade Premierships: – 1961, 1972, 1974, 1976 & 1981.
- 2nd Grade Runners Up: 1950, 1952, 1955, 1962, 1968, 1971, 1975, 1980, 2008 & 2009.
- 3rd Grade Premierships: – 12 – 1959, 1960, 1967, 1970, 1972, 1977, 1983, 1993, 2008, 2009, 2019 & 2020.
- 3rd Grade Runners Up: – 1948, 1951, 1962, 1966, 1969, 1973, 1974, 1975, 1978, 1981, 1992, 1994, 1999 & 2000.
- 4th Grade Premierships: 18 – 1949, 1952, 1953,1955, 1958, 1969, 1970, 1972, 1974, 1975, 1980, 1985, 1991, 1992, 1993, 1999, 2000 & 2007.
- 4th Grade Runners Up: – 1950, 1954, 1959, 1960, 1961, 1973, 1977, 1983, 1987 & 2020

== Gordon D.R.U.F.C Veterans (World War II) KIA ==
- P Braithwaite
- E A Cameron
- W Carter
- A Chowne
- J E Cunningham
- D Davidson
- R V Keirath
- K Lauder
- R Lawrence
- C Lord
- D Mackerras
- J J Manners
- A J McGlynn
- J McKenzie
- F Meech
- J Musgrave
- C C Pike
- R Prince
- J Reedie
- A Sands
- L Stenhouse
- R Upward

== Club song ==
(To the tune of the Scottish folk song of the same name)

A Gordon for Me

1st Verse

I’m Georgie McHugh of the Gordon RU.
I’m fond of a lassie and drappie or two.
One day when out walking I chanced to see
A bonnie wee lass wi’ a glint in her ee.

Says I to the lassie will ye walk for a while.
I’ll buy ye a bonnet and we’ll do it in style,
My kilt is the tartan of the Gordon RU.
She looked at me shyly and said, Is that true?

Chorus

A Gordon for me, a Gordon for me.
If you’re not a Gordon you’re no use to me,
The Eastwoods are braw, the Randwicks an a’
But the cocky wee Gordon's the pride of them all.

2nd Verse

I courted that girl on the Banks of the Dee.
And made up my mind she was fashioned for me,
And soon I was thinking how nice it would be
If she would consent to get married to me.

The day we were wed the grass was so green,
The sun was as bright as the light in her een,
Now we’ve two bonnie lassies who sit on her knee.
While she sings the song that she once sang to me.

Chorus

A Gordon for me, a Gordon for me.
If you’re not a Gordon you’re no use to me,
The Eastwoods are braw, the Randwicks an a’
But the cocky wee Gordon's the pride of them all.
