= John Currie (sportsman) =

English rugby union player and cricketer

Personal information
- Full name: John David Currie
- Born: 3 May 1932; Clifton, Bristol, England
- Died: 8 December 1990 (aged 58); Leicester, England
- Batting: Right-handed

Domestic team information
- Years: Team
- 1953: Somerset
- 1956–1957: Oxford University

Career statistics
Competition	FC
Matches	10
Runs scored	283
Batting average	14.89
100s/50s	0/0
Top score	38
Catches/stumpings	4/–
- Source: CricketArchive, 22 December 2015
- Height: 6 ft 3 in (1.91 m)
- Weight: 15 st (210 lb; 95 kg)

Rugby union career
- Position: Lock
International career
Years	Team	Apps	(Points)
1956–62	England	25	(16)

John David Currie (3 May 1932 – 8 December 1990) was a sportsman who played rugby union for England in 25 Test matches and also appeared in first-class cricket matches for Somerset and Oxford University. He was born at Clifton, Bristol and died at Leicester.

== Rugby career ==
Currie was educated at Bristol Grammar School and played his early rugby for Clifton and Somerset before attending Oxford University to study geography. He appeared in four Varsity Matches for Oxford, on each occasion opposed by David Marques. The pair of them would form a noted second-row partnership, which began when they both made Test debuts for England against Wales in the 1956 Five Nations. Unusual for a lock, Currie had a kicking ability which contributed four penalties and two conversions in that year's Five Nations. The partnership with Marques lasted for 22 consecutive Tests spanning five years, a successful period for England as they won the Grand Slam in 1957 as well as Five Nations championship titles in 1958 and 1960. Currie made the last of his 25 Test appearances against France in 1962. In his club career, he has spells at Harlequins, Bristol, Northern and West of Scotland.

In the 1970's, Currie served as an England selector and from 1980 until 1988 served as chairman of Harlequins where he oversaw a major restructuring of the club.

== Cricket career ==
In cricket, Currie was a right-handed middle- or lower-order batsman. In 1953, at the disastrous Bath cricket festival where the first match, Bertie Buse's benefit match, was over in a single day, he made his first-class debut in the third game, against Leicestershire, scoring 4 and 13 in another match of feeble batting that was over well inside two days. He retained his place for the next match, a non-first-class game against the Royal Air Force, but those were his only appearances for Somerset's first team, although he played for the second eleven in the Minor Counties Championship up to 1955. In both the 1956 and 1957 seasons, he was at Oxford University and he was tried for the cricket team in several matches, but with little success. His highest score was 38, made out of a total of 95 in the match against Yorkshire in 1957. He had dropped out of the Oxford side well before the University Match in both seasons and so did not win a cricket Blue to go with the rugby ones. After leaving Oxford, he played second eleven cricket for Gloucestershire for a couple of seasons.
