= Brian Steele (rugby union) =

New Zealand rugby union player (1929–2026)

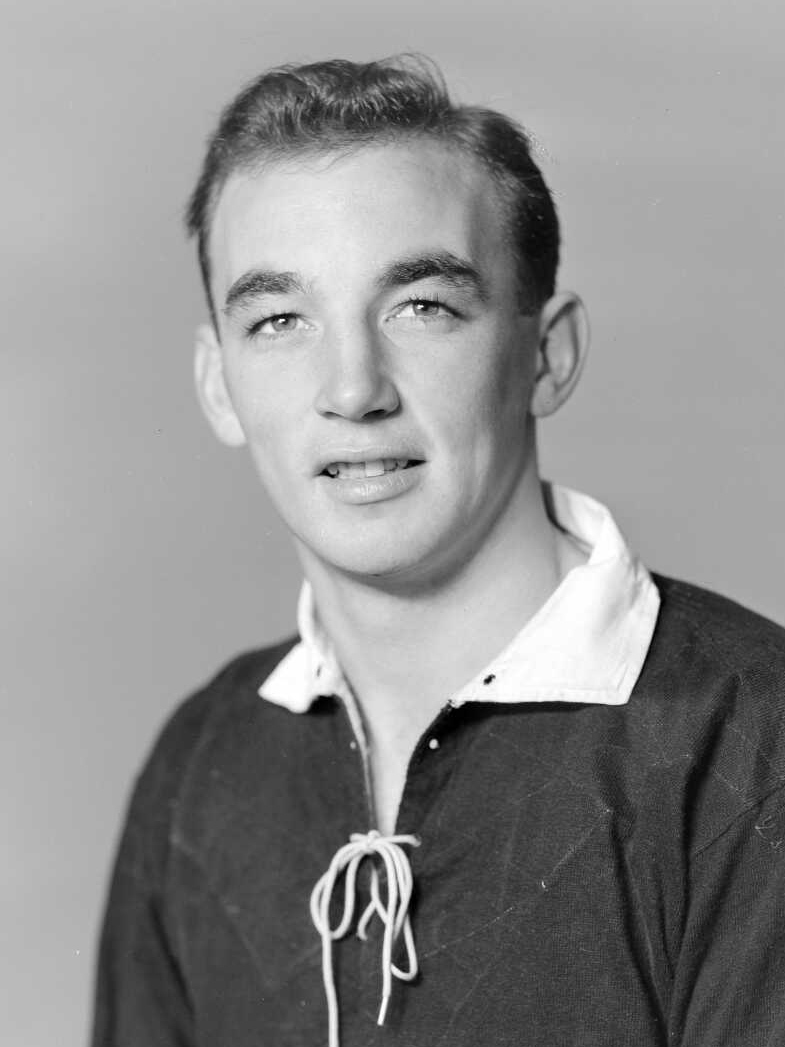
- Steele, c. 1951
- Born: Leo Brian Steele; 19 January 1929 Wellington, New Zealand
- Died: 9 November 2026 (aged 97)
- Height: 1.63 m (5 ft 4 in)
- Weight: 66 kg (146 lb)
- School: Wellington Technical College
- Notable relative: Christian Cullen (great-nephew)

Rugby union career
- Position: Halfback
Provincial / State sides
Years	Team	Apps	(Points)
1950–1953	Wellington	20	
1954	Horowhenua	6	
International career
Years	Team	Apps	(Points)
1951	New Zealand	3	(0)

Leo Brian Steele (19 January 1929 – 9 November 2026) was a New Zealand rugby union player. A halfback, Steele represented Wellington and Horowhenua at a provincial level. He was a member of the New Zealand national side, the All Blacks, for their 1951 tour of Australia, on which he played in nine matches, including three internationals.

With the death of Bill McCaw on 6 May 2025, Steele became the oldest living All Black. Steele died on 9 November 2026, at the age of 97.

Records
Preceded by Bill McCaw	Oldest living All Black; 6 May 2025 – 9 November 2026	Succeeded by Des Connor
