= David Shepherd (rugby union) =

David John Shepherd (1936 – 1 October 2003) was an advertising executive and one of the few Englishmen to play for the Australia national rugby union team.

David Shepherd was one of the rare men who graduated from club rugby in Melbourne through the Victorian state team to the ranks of the Wallabies. He played his first Test against New Zealand in 1964 and was capped four times more before a crippling injury forced his early retirement from the game.

== Early life ==
Shepherd was born in Cheshire and boarded at Blundell's School in Devon. He was 17 when his father was sent to Australia in 1953 to become chairman of Unilever. Shepherd joined the advertising industry, which suited his intellect and his insightful knowledge of others, especially regarding how they were motivated. He quickly moved up the ladder and became a manager at an early age. In January 1959, he married Louise Palmer, with whom he had four children: Tim, James, Annabelle (deceased) and Georgina.

== Rugby career ==
Shepherd lived and worked in Melbourne from 1955 to 1965 and during this time played rugby - and, less seriously, cricket - with the Harlequin Club, where he stood out as a natural and inspirational leader both on and off the field of play. He was club captain and captain of Victoria for a number of years until his talents were eventually recognised by the national selectors. He was considered a "find" at the 1963 Wallaby trials in Sydney and was picked for the tour South Africa that year.

His performance against the Northern Transvaal provincial side made him a serious Test candidate, but Australia already had a powerful and cohesive back row and Shepherd had no alternative but to wait out one more season.

His chance eventually came in the third Test against the All Blacks. Australia won the match handsomely and Shepherd cemented his place in the Wallabies. In a written tribute, his former Australian teammate, Mike Jenkinson, has described the way he played "with a sort of breathless aggression, giving ground to nobody and showing utter disinterest in reputations. There seemed to be no problem for him in stepping up from Melbourne club rugby to this new level. "He tackled hard, corner-flagged in the required manner, and was prominent in the forward charges", Jenkinson wrote. "He rucked as if he had learnt the game in King Country (a rugged part of NZ's North Island, from where the hard men reputedly came), not south-west England."

It was a huge loss for Victoria and the Harlequin Club when Shepherd moved to Sydney and the Gordon RFC in 1966 to continue his international career. It was only natural, somehow, that he would then captain Gordon until his retirement from rugby.

== Later life and death ==
Despite his Wallaby status he still had a soft spot for "The Old Country"; not in rugby, but his support for its cricket team continued, although in latter years he silently despaired of the MCC coming up with the goods on the cricket pitch. His Englishness was apparent in his continued good manners, irrespective of the situation, although he could be somewhat irascible when annoyed by waiters or tradesmen. The term "my good man" was the signal that danger was imminent.

Shepherd left Australia to work in Southeast Asia, where he became regional CEO of the multinational advertising firm USP Benson Needham, operating first of all from Singapore – where he coached the Singapore national rugby union team – then from Bangkok.

He retired to Sunshine Beach, Noosa, in 1995. In 2003 he was badly injured in a car accident near his home and died shortly afterwards from a heart attack.

== Sources ==
- "Young Harlequin who joined the Wallaby pack". The Sydney Morning Herald. 25 October 2003.
- ESPN Profile
