= Twinkletoes (nickname) =

Twinkletoes is a nickname of:

== People with the nickname ==
- George Curtis (footballer, born 1919) (1919–2004), English football player and coach
- Chia Boon Leong (1925-2022), Singaporian football player and coach
- Laurie Dwyer (1938–2016), Australian rules footballer
- Ronald Meadows (1931–1985), Australian rugby union player
- Leo Paquin (1910–1993), American college football player
- George Selkirk (1908–1987), Canadian Major League Baseball player and executive
- Cyril Williams (1921–1980), English footballer

== Fictional characters with the nickname ==
- nickname used by Toph for Aang, protagonist of the animated television series Avatar: The Last Airbender
- bowling nickname of Fred Flintstone, main character of the animated television series The Flintstones and other works
- Grace Hastings, a mascot and main character from the Skechers brand of the same name, a 14-year-old girl with light-up shoes, hence her nickname
