= Bob Templeton (rugby union) =

Australian rugby union coach (1932–1999)

Bob Templeton MBE
- Full name: Robert Ian Templeton
- Born: 27 July 1932 Rockhampton, QLD, Australia
- Died: 5 December 1999 (aged 67) Brisbane, QLD, Australia
- School: Anglican Church Grammar School

Rugby union career
Coaching career
- Years: Team
- 1962–71, 1976–88: Queensland
- 1971–74, 1976, 1979–82: Australia

Robert Ian Templeton MBE (27 July 1932 — 5 December 1999) was an Australian rugby union coach who led the Wallabies in 29 Test matches during the 1970s and 1980s. He also coached Queensland in 233 matches.

== Biography ==
The son of a grazier, Templeton was born in Rockhampton and educated at Anglican Church Grammar School. He spent his playing career as a forward for GPS during the 1950s and got his start in coaching at the same club. After steering GPS to a premiership in 1961, Templeton was appointed Queensland coach and remained in that position until ascending to the Wallabies post in 1971, succeeding the retired Des Connor.

=== National coach ===
Templeton's first assignment as national coach was the 1971 tour of France, with the Wallabies claiming a maiden win on French soil in the first Test in Toulouse, before France levelled the two-Test series in Colombes. A loss to Tonga in 1973 was a long point of his coaching tenure and after some more poor results he lost his position in 1975 to NSW coach David Brockhoff. He returned in 1976 to lead the Wallabies to another tour of France, then held the role permanently from 1979 to 1981, with mixed results. Under Templeton, the Wallabies beat the All Blacks 2–1 in an away series in 1980 and the following year swept France 2–0 at home. He was replaced by Bob Dwyer in 1982 after the Wallabies came back from the 1981–82 grand slam tour having won only one Test. In 1991, Templeton was an assistant to Dwyer when the Wallabies won the Rugby World Cup.
