= Peter Phipps (rugby union) =

- Full name: Peter Joseph Phipps
- Born: 22 April 1933 Batavia, Java, Dutch East Indies
- Died: 26 May 2017 (aged 84)
- School: Barker College
- Notable relative: Jim Phipps (brother)

Rugby union career
- Position: Utility back
Provincial / State sides
Years	Team	Apps	(Points)
1955–56	New South Wales	2	(6)
International career
Years	Team	Apps	(Points)
1955	Australia		

Peter Joseph Phipps (22 April 1933 – 26 May 2017) was an Australian international rugby union player.

Born in Batavia, Dutch East Indies, Phipps was the youngest of four brothers to play first grade for Gordon, and one of two to represent the Wallabies, along with centre Jim Phipps. He attended Sydney's Barker College, where in addition to rugby he excelled in athletics, before undertaking further studies at Hawkesbury Agricultural College.

Phipps, primarily an inside centre, got a chance to play beside his brother Jim in the Wallabies side when he was selected for their 1955 tour of New Zealand, on the back of a two-try performance for New South Wales against Queensland. He played four uncapped tour matches and was due to play the second Test at Carisbrook, until a tour ending knee injury forced his withdrawal. In 1957, Phipps retired from rugby after it was discovered he had two broken vertebrae in his lower spine, a result of an injury the previous year while competing for Gordon.

== See also ==
- List of Australia national rugby union players
