= Geoffrey Vaughan =

- Born: Geoffrey Norman Vaughan; 9 April 1933 Sydney
- Died: 4 January 2018 (aged 84)
- School: Homebush Boys High School
- University: University of Sydney; Melbourne University

Rugby union career
- Position: prop
Amateur team(s)
Years	Team	Apps	(Points)
- Western Suburbs
–	Melbourne University Rugby Club		
International career
Years	Team	Apps	(Points)
1958	Wallabies	6	(0)

Geoffrey Norman Vaughan (9 April 1933 – 4 January 2018) was an Australian rugby union player, a national representative prop forward of the 1950s.

Vaughan was born in Sydney and claimed a total of 6 international rugby caps for Australia. He made the Wallabies' 1957–58 Australia rugby union tour of Britain, Ireland and France where he played in three Tests. His other Test match appearances were made against the New Zealand Maori during their 1958 tour to Australia.

He later served as Dean of the Victorian College of Pharmacy (1979–1987) and director of the Chisholm Institute of Technology. In 2006, Vaughan was made officer of the Order of Australia.
