= Roy Roper =

New Zealand rugby union player (1923–2023)

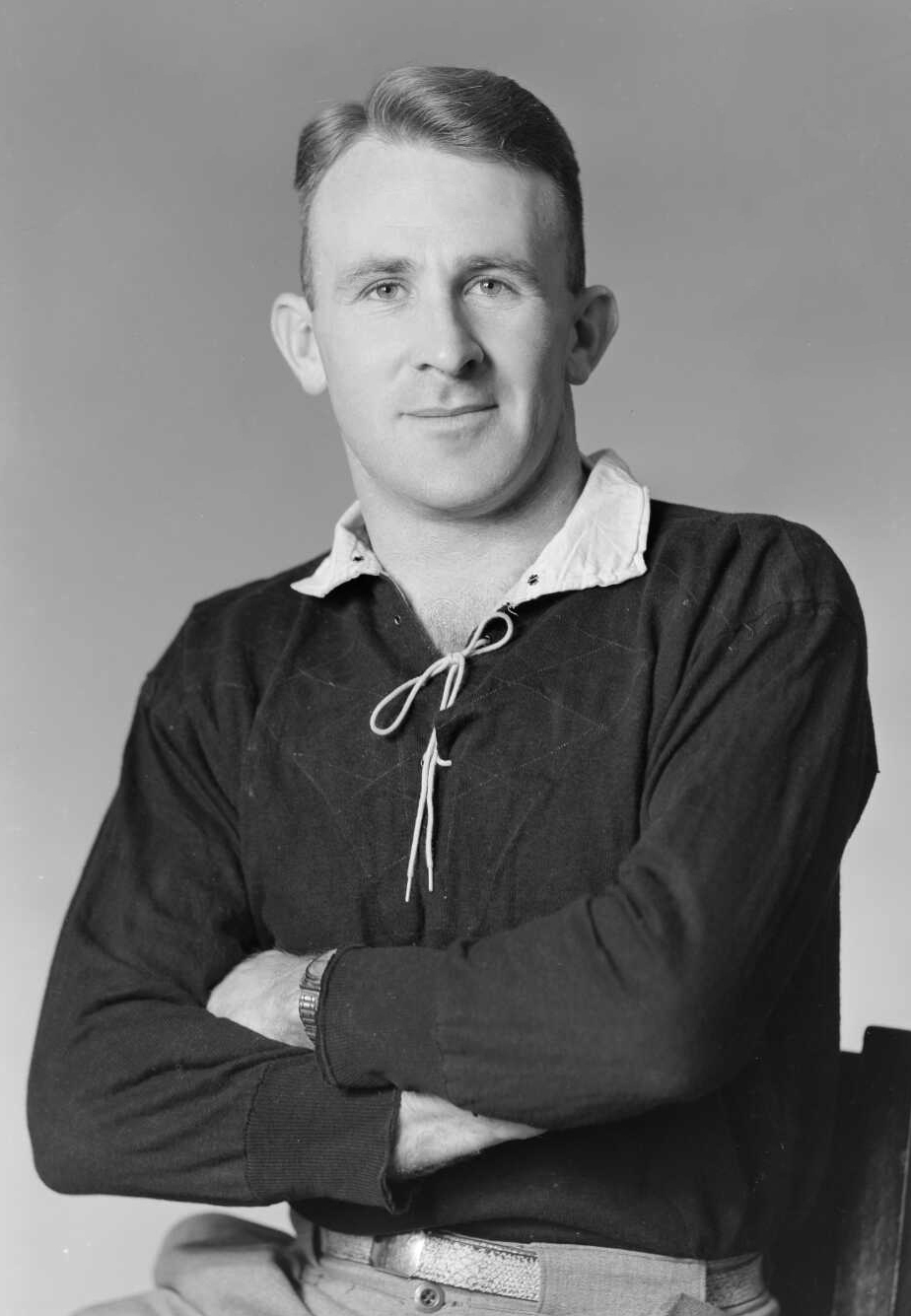
- Roper in 1946
- Born: Roy Alfred Roper; 11 August 1923 Ōwhango, New Zealand
- Died: 14 September 2023 (aged 100) New Plymouth, New Zealand
- Height: 1.73 m (5 ft 8 in)
- Weight: 72 kg (159 lb)
- School: New Plymouth Boys' High School

Rugby union career
- Position: Three-quarter
Provincial / State sides
Years	Team	Apps	(Points)
1946–1950	Taranaki		
International career
Years	Team	Apps	(Points)
1949–1950	New Zealand	5	(9)

Roy Alfred Roper (11 August 1923 – 14 September 2023) was a New Zealand rugby union player. A three-quarter, Roper represented Taranaki at a provincial level, and was a member of the New Zealand national side, the All Blacks, from 1949 to 1950. He played five matches for the All Blacks, all of them internationals. He later served as treasurer of the Taranaki Rugby Football Union from 1952 to 1971.

During World War II, Roper served overseas with the Royal New Zealand Navy and appeared in six matches for the New Zealand Services XV in England.

With the death of Ron Elvidge in 2019, Roper became the oldest living All Black. He celebrated his 100th birthday on 11 August 2023, becoming the first former All Black to reach that milestone. Roper died a month later, on 14 September.

Records
Preceded by Ron Elvidge	Oldest living All Black; 30 March 2019 – 14 September 2023	Succeeded by Bill McCaw
