= Bill McCaw =

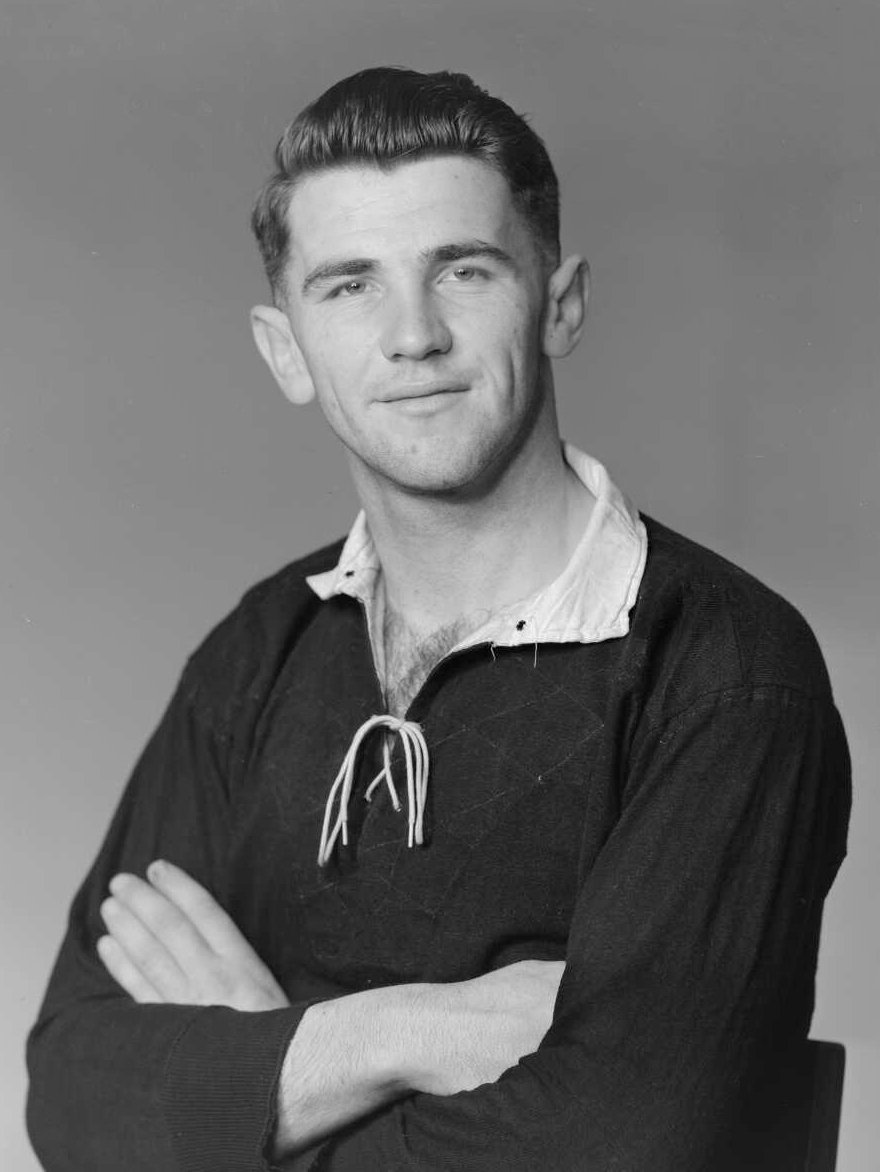
- McCaw c. 1951
- Born: William Alexander McCaw; 26 August 1927 Gore, New Zealand
- Died: 6 May 2025 (aged 97) Christchurch, New Zealand
- Height: 1.83 m (6 ft 0 in)
- Weight: 90 kg (200 lb)
- School: St. Kevin's College, Oamaru

Rugby union career
- Position(s): Number 8 Flanker
Provincial / State sides
Years	Team	Apps	(Points)
1949–55	Southland	50	
International career
Years	Team	Apps	(Points)
1951–54	New Zealand	5	(0)

William Alexander McCaw (26 August 1927 – 6 May 2025) was a New Zealand international rugby union player. He was a member of the All Blacks in 1951 and in 1953–54, playing in the number 8 and flanker positions.

== Early life ==
McCaw was born in Gore and educated at St. Kevin's College, Oamaru where he played rugby for the school.

== Senior rugby ==
McCaw played for the Marist club and represented Southland from 1949 until 1955. He played for the South Island team in the years 1950–54 and was a New Zealand trialist in 1950, 1951 and 1953 and 1957. He played in a New Zealand XV in 1952 and 1954–55.

== All Black ==
McCaw was selected for the All Blacks in 1951. He played against in the 1951 tour of Australia and played in all three tests. He could not play because of injury in 1952. In 1953 he was selected again and participated in the 1953–1954 British tour. He played in 22 of 36 matches including the Welsh and French tests. He was captain of the All Blacks in the game against North of Scotland. In all McCaw played 32 matches for the All Blacks, 5 of them were tests. He gained 18 points for New Zealand (6 tries).

With the death of Roy Roper in 2023, McCaw became the oldest living All Black. McCaw died in Christchurch on 6 May 2025, at the age of 97.

Records
Preceded by Roy Roper	Oldest living All Black; 14 September 2023 – 6 May 2025	Succeeded by Brian Steele
