= Mac Hughes =

- Full name: Norman McLaurin Hughes
- Born: 18 November 1932 Albury, NSW, Australia
- Died: January 2021 (aged 88) Brisbane, QLD, Australia

Rugby union career
- Position: Flanker / No. 8
International career
Years	Team	Apps	(Points)
1953–58	Australia	14	(3)

Norman McLaurin Hughes (18 November 1932 — January 2021) was an Australian rugby union international.

Hughes, a native of Albury, received his education in Sydney, attending Mosman Preparatory School and Sydney Church of England Grammar School. He played rugby for Sydney University during his tertiary studies.

A back row forward, Hughes gained 14 caps during his time with the Wallabies, which began on the 1953 tour of South Africa. He played all four Tests on the tour, which included an influential performance in the win over the Springboks in Cape Town. After finishing his Wallabies career with five Test appearances during the 1957–58 tour of Britain, Ireland and France, Hughes spent the next few years in London, where he played rugby for Blackheath and Middlesex.

== See also ==
- List of Australia national rugby union players
