= Tony Fox (rugby union) =

Australian rugby union player (1933–2026)

- Born: Otho George Fox; 3 July 1933 Kogarah, New South Wales, Australia
- Died: 17 April 2025 (aged 91)

Rugby union career
- Position: wing
International career
Years	Team	Apps	(Points)
1958	Wallabies	1	(0)

Otho George "Tony" Fox (3 July 1933 – 17 April 2025) was an Australian rugby union player who represented Australia.

Fox, a wing, was born in Kogarah, New South Wales and claimed 1 international rugby cap for Australia on the Wallabies' 1957–58 Australia rugby union tour of Britain, Ireland and France.

Fox died on 17 April 2025, at the age of 91.
