= Robin Marques =

English cricketer

Robin Marques (born Charles Vernon Lewis Marques) was an English cricketer who played for Hertfordshire.

Having represented the team in the Minor Counties Championship between 1947 and 1966, Marques made two List A appearances for the team, between 1964 and 1966. In his debut, against Durham, he scored 10 runs from the tailend, becoming the highest-scoring player on the Hertfordshire team.

Two seasons later, he made his second and final List A appearance, in which he scored 13 runs — in a match in which teammate Alan Bell, playing in his only List A match, scored 105 runs.

Robin Marques was the brother of David Marques.

Robin Marques was born on 2 October 1923 and died on 5 May 2014
