= Cedric Emanuel =

New Zealand born Australian artist (1906–1995)

Cedric Emanuel OAM
- Born: Cedric Raymond Emanuel; 1 July 1906; Gisborne, New Zealand
- Died: 1 March 1995 (aged 88); Sydney, NSW, Australia
- Occupations: Painter, illustrator and printmaker

Cedric Raymond Emanuel (1906–1995) was a New Zealand born Australian representational painter, illustrator and printmaker. Speaking at the 1995 Retrospectives exhibition of Emanuel's works, New South Wales Governor Rear-Admiral Peter Sinclair pointed to the artist's speciality in drawing and painting "scenes of yesteryear, and of buildings and locations that are national heritage items". He was an important Australian visual historian, "for almost seventy years" sketching and painting the "rapidly changing scenes of Australia from the outback to the inner suburbs of Sydney".

== Early life and education ==
Emanuel was born on 1 July 1906 in Gisborne, New Zealand. He moved to Australia when he was four. After attending school in the Sydney suburbs of Killara and Bondi, he studied art under Dattilo Rubbo at the Royal Art Society and Julian Ashton at the Julian Ashton Art School. He later learned etching under Sydney Long.

== Career ==
During the 1920s and 1930s he worked as a commercial artist and during his leisure hours worked to improve his skills in sketching, painting and etching. He was a sports enthusiast, especially in swimming, surfing, boxing, wrestling and Rugby football.

During World War II he served as an Aerodrome Defence Officer with the Royal Australian Air Force in New Guinea and was an "unofficial war artist" there. A collection of his drawings from those years were published in his South Pacific Sketchbook (Prentice-Hall, 1945).

In the postwar decades Emanuel worked primarily as a freelancer, creating "sketches in watercolour or ink depicting various aspects of Australia". These were published in 49 books (by 1990) issued by major Australian publishers including Rigby Limited, Angus & Robertson and Cassell Australia, and with text by authors such as Geoffrey Dutton, Philip Geeves, Ruth Park, Olaf Ruhen and Tess van Sommers. His sketches also appeared as "cards, scenic folios, calendars and wrapping paper" for the wider public.

== Exhibitions ==
Emanuel's first exhibition was in 1938 and was "successful" and the National Gallery of New South Wales purchased two. In 1942 his work was included in "an exhibition of Australian art that travelled the United States". He exhibited in most Australian states over the years, including at the Holdsworth Galleries, Sydney in 1988. In 1995 there was a retrospective exhibition of his work at the Sydney Jewish Museum.

== Awards ==
- 1938: Etching Award in Sesqui-centenary National Art Competition
- 1981: Medal of the Order of Australia (OAM) for his services to art

== Holdings of his work ==
Examples of his work are held in the National Gallery of Australia, the State Galleries of New South Wales, Victoria, Queensland and South Australia, and the Australian National University In New South Wales examples are also held by the Newcastle Art Gallery, the Mitchell Library, a number of local council libraries and in a number of private collections. For example, for the centenary of Captain Cook's arrival in Botany Bay Emanuel himself published a limited edition of a collection of relevant black and white drawing in a volume Historic Sydney 1970; the 930/1000 copy is held in the State Library of NSW.

== Personal life ==
Cedric Emanuel married Bella "Billie" Oppenheim in 1938 and they had two children, Janese and rugby international David.

He died in Sydney on 1 March 1995.

== Bibliography ==
The following are some of the books illustrated by Cedric Emanuel.

=== Rigby Sketchbook Series ===
Emanuel contributed to 16 books in this series. They comprise compilations of his sketches of historic buildings and localities in Australian cities, towns and suburbs, including Historic Buildings of Sydney Sketchbook (1972), published by Rigby Limited, Adelaide. They are listed here.

=== Other Rigby Limited books ===
- Portrait of Tasmania, Adelaide: Rigby, 1974.
- Australian Horses, Adelaide: Rigby, 1975. Text by Margaret I. Clarke.
- Portrait of Adelaide, Adelaide: Rigby, 1975. Text by David Mercer.
- Portrait of Perth, Adelaide: Rigby, 1977. Text by B. Kirwan Ward.

=== Angus & Robertson ===
- Australia, This Changing Land, Sydney: Angus and Robertson, 1972. Text by Olaf Ruhen.
- The Great South Land, Sydney: Angus & Robertson, 1975. Text by Donald McLean.
- Sydney Yesterday & Today, Sydney: Angus & Robertson, 1978.
- The Etchings of Cedric Emanuel, Sydney: Angus & Robertson, 1980.
- Philip Geeves' Sydney, London and Sydney: Angus & Robertson, 1981. Text by Philip Geeves.

=== Cassell Australia ===
- Historic Towns of New South Wales, Stanmore, N.S.W.: Cassell Australia, 1979.
- The Rocks : Sydney's Most Historic Area, Stanmore, N.S.W.: Cassell Australia, 1979.
- Sydney Harbour, North Ryde, N.S.W.: Cassell Australia, 1981. Text by Tess van Sommers.

=== Other publishers ===
- Southwest Pacific Sketchbook, New York: Prentice-Hall, 1945.
- Run o' Waters: Tales of Australian Country, People and Places, The Lisp of Rivers and the Song of Birds, Sydney: John Sands, 1948. Text by John Fairfax.
- Drift of Leaves, Sydney: Ure Smith, 1952. Text by John Fairfax. Edited by John Brennan.
- Garden Island People, Sydney: Wentworth Books, 1975. Text by Nancy Keesing.
- A Gentle Shipwreck, Melbourne: Thomas Nelson Australia, 1975. Text by L. C. (Lewis Charles) Rodd.
- Hard Times and Rough Justice, Sydney, N.S.W.: Angus & Robertson, 1975. Text by Donald McLean.
- Chaffey's Kingdom : The Sunraysia Story, South Melbourne, Vic.: Macmillan for the Australian Dried Fruits Association, 1976.
- Historic Churches of New South Wales, Terrey Hills, N.S.W.: A. H. & A. W. Reed, c. 1978. Text by Alan Nichols, Jill Garland and John Martin; with an introduction by Manning Clark; with photography by Fritz Prenzel; and with drawings by Cedric Emanuel.
- Historic Parramatta, Parramatta, N.S.W.: Parramatta City Council, ca. 1980. Text by Tess van Sommers.
- Norfolk Island and Lord Howe Island, Dover Heights, N.S.W.: Serendip, c. 1982. Text by Ruth Park.
- The Tasmania We Love, Melbourne: Nelson, 1987. Text by Ruth Park.
- Waterways of Sydney: A Sketchbook, Melbourne: J. M. Dent, 1988. Text by Geoffrey Dutton.
