= Rod Phelps =

Former rugby union player for Australia

Roderick Phelps (born 1934) is an Australian former rugby union player. He played fullback, wing and centre and debuted for Australia against New Zealand in the 2nd test at Dunedin in 1955. He toured New Zealand and South Africa and went on the 1957–58 Australia rugby union tour of Britain, Ireland and France, playing 23 Tests for Australia between 1955 and 1962.
