= Chilla Wilson =

Australian rugby union player

- Born: Charles Roy Wilson; 4 May 1931 Brisbane, Queensland
- Died: 2 September 2016 (aged 85)
- School: Brisbane Grammar School; Marist College Ashgrove
- University: University of Queensland
- Occupation: Gynaecologist

Rugby union career
- Position: Flanker
Amateur team(s)
Years	Team	Apps	(Points)
1951–57	University of Queensland		
1958–59	Army R.C. (Brisbane)		
- Edinburgh Wanderers
1966–68	Wests Brisbane		
Provincial / State sides
Years	Team	Apps	(Points)
1952–59	Queensland		
1963–64	London Counties		
International career
Years	Team	Apps	(Points)
1958–59	Australia	12	(0)

Charles "Chilla" Roy Wilson (4 May 1931 – 2 September 2016) was an Australian national representative rugby union flanker and national captain. He was tour manager on a number of Wallaby international tours of the 1980s including the 1984 Wallaby Grand Slam tour of the British Isles.

== Family and early life ==
Wilson was born at Ashgrove in Queensland. He attended Marist College Ashgrove initially (which was evacuated to Eagle Heights at Mt. Tamborine in the wartime years between 1942 and 1944) and then Brisbane Grammar School where he played schoolboy rugby. Wilson continued playing at the University of Queensland, while he pursued his medical studies. His older brother Dr Fergus Wilson, who later became an orthopaedic surgeon, was also involved with rugby at the university and later coached various teams.

== Playing career ==
While playing for University, Wilson won the Brisbane Premiership five times. He was first selected to represent Queensland against a touring side in 1952 and then again four years later when a South African side was visiting.

After completing his medical training at the Mater Hospital in Brisbane, he joined the army as a Medical Officer for two years. It was while playing for the army rugby team that he was selected for Australia. Wilson made his international debut in 1957, starting as a flanker for the Wallabies against the All Blacks in Sydney, and although he was the incumbent Queensland state captain he was not selected for the 1957–58 Australia rugby union tour of Britain, Ireland and France.

In 1958 with Wilson as captain, Queensland beat New South Wales in the interstate series for only the second time since the war and Wilson was rewarded with the national captaincy of the 1958 Wallabies to tour New Zealand. Wilson captained Australia in 11 of 13 games played including three Tests. Although Australia won the second Test the final tour record had the Wallabies winning only six games of thirteen games and drawing one.

Wilson made a further state appearance against the visiting British & Irish Lions in 1959 but this would be his last representative game in Australia. All told he played for Australia twelve times, four of which were Tests and captained the side in eleven of those appearances.

In the early 1960s Wilson undertook post-graduate studies in England and Scotland and played with the Edinburgh Wanderers. In 1963 & '64 he was selected in a London Counties side who played against the visiting All Blacks.

== Team manager ==
At the end of his career Wilson captain-coached a side at Wests Brisbane, and then began to manage the Queensland state team and later the national team. He managed the 1982 Australia rugby union tour of New Zealand and the 1983 Australia rugby union tour of Italy and France. The following year he was an integral part of the Wallabies' coming-of-age on the 1984 Grand Slam tour of Britain and Ireland.

Howell quotes from Mark Ella's book of the tour Paths to Victory that in 1984 Wilson managed in the style of a benevolent, big brother and directly quotes Ella:

I couldn't think of a better manager. I played for Australia for six years. Thank God I had Chilla Wilson for three of them. With Jonesy up there dominating everything, Chilla was the perfect foil. He was quiet, unobtrusive and didn't make a lot of noise. In fact, you wouldn't know Chilla was the manager until the time came for somebody to get up and say the right thing. The biggest thing Chilla had in his favour was that everybody loved him. We gave him a hard time, but nobody wanted to be the one that let him down. He was the perfect player's manager.

== Bibliography ==
- Howell, Max (2005) Born to Lead – Wallaby Test Captains, Celebrity Books, Auckland NZ

Sporting positions
Preceded by Des Connor	Australian national rugby union captain 1958	Succeeded by Peter Fenwicke
