= Des Connor =

Australian rugby union player

- Born: Desmond Michael Connor; 9 August 1935 (age 91) Ashgrove, Queensland, Australia
- Height: 1.8 m (5 ft 11 in)
- Weight: 78 kg (172 lb)
- School: Marist College Ashgrove
- Occupation: School teacher

Rugby union career
- Position: Scrum-half
Provincial / State sides
Years	Team	Apps	(Points)
1954–1959	Queensland		
1960–1966	Auckland	69	
International career
Years	Team	Apps	(Points)
1958–1959	Australia	12	(0)
1961–1964	New Zealand	12	(0)

Desmond Michael Connor (born 9 August 1935) is a former Australian rugby union player and coach. He played for both the Australia and New Zealand national teams, and later coached Australia. He is an inductee in the Australian Rugby Union Hall of Fame.

== Early life ==
Connor was born in Ashgrove, Queensland, Australia, on 9 August 1935, and was educated at Marist College Ashgrove.

== Playing career ==
=== Australia ===
After taking up the game at Marist College Ashgrove, Connor honed his skills further with the Brothers club. He made his representative debut for Queensland in 1954 and made further appearances for the state over the next five years.

He was selected in Australia national squad for the Wallabies' 1957–58 Australia rugby union tour of Britain, Ireland and France. Connor made his Australian test debut on 4 January 1958 against Wales and played in all five internationals on the tour. Later that year he captained the Wallabies in Tests against the New Zealand Maori, and then played against the All Blacks on a tour of New Zealand.

At the start of the 1960s he left Australia to continue his teaching career in New Zealand, working at Takapuna Grammar.

=== New Zealand ===
Following his move to New Zealand he was capped 12 times by the All Blacks, with a record of 10 wins, a draw and a defeat. The defeat came in his final match in 1964, against Australia at Wellington.

== Coaching ==
He was to return to Australian rugby as a coach firstly at Brisbane Brothers, then Queensland and Australia. He led the Wallabies in that role in their home series against New Zealand in 1968. A keen tactician and student of the game, Connor studied the rulebook and after consulting with referees, he introduced in the first Test the first short lineout used in the Southern Hemisphere.

Connor also oversaw the 1969 and 1971 tours to South Africa.

== Later life ==
With the death of Brian Steele on 9 November 2026, Connor became the oldest living All Black.

Rugby union
Preceded by Bob Davidson	Australian national rugby union captain 1958	Succeeded by Chilla Wilson
Preceded by Alan Roper	Australian national rugby union coach 1968–1971	Succeeded by Bob Templeton
Records
Preceded by Brian Steele	Oldest living All Black; 9 November 2026 – present	Incumbent
