= Doris Margaret Osborne =

Australian schoolteacher (1906–1977)

- Born: October 22, 1906; Glen Innes
- Died: June 27, 1977 (aged 70); West Wyalong
- Education: University of Sydney
- Occupation: teacher
- Known for: campaigning for women's rights
- Spouse: Harold Heylar

Doris Margaret Osborne became Doris Margaret Heylar (October 22, 1906 – June 27, 1977) was an Australian schoolteacher and campaigner for equal rights for women. She was the first woman to be the principal of a New South Wales co-educational high school in 1966.

== Life ==
Osborne was born in 1906 in Glen Innes. She graduated from the University of Sydney and taught maths and physics.

In 1955 she took a higher position of deputy-headmistress at Fairfield Girls' High School although she was later to note as a more active member of the New South Wales Teachers Federation that this was effectively a one way journey. She had a more senior position but women were not allowed to be in authority in a boys or mixed school. So if she wanted to return to her former school then she would need to take a demotion.

She became known for her stance not only on equal pay for women but also on equal opportunity. She had moved an amendment to Lucy Woodcock and Vera Leggett's resolution at the New South Wales Teachers' Federation in 1951. The resolution on equal pay was changed to add the additional words of "and opportunity".

In 1961 she moved from Blacktown where she had led the girls' school for two years to take up a similar position at Strathfield Girls High School. In 1965 she went travelling and she returned to work at West Wyalong school in 1966. She was the first woman to be the principal of a co-educational high school in New South Wales. Former principals at the school had all been men and they had all enjoyed free accommodation. An exception was made when she was appointed.

Osborne died in 1977 in West Wyalong.
