= Robin Davies (rugby union) =

- Full name: Robin Havard Davies
- Born: 12 January 1934 Battersea, London, England
- Died: 7 October 2011 (aged 77) Penarth, Wales
- School: King's College School
- University: University of Oxford

Rugby union career
- Position: Wing-forward
International career
Years	Team	Apps	(Points)
1957–62	Wales	6	(3)

Robin Havard Davies (12 January 1934 — 7 October 2011) was a Welsh international rugby union player.

Born and raised in London, Davies was educated at King's College School in the city's Wimbledon district and gained three rugby blues while a chemistry student at the University of Oxford.

Davies gained six Wales caps playing as a wing-forward between 1957 and 1962, which included their win over the touring 1957–58 Wallabies at Cardiff Arms Park. He toured South Africa with the Barbarians in 1958 and took over as captain of his club London Welsh in the 1959–60 season.

== See also ==
- List of Wales national rugby union players
