= Bob Davidson (rugby union) =

Australia international rugby union player

- Born: Robert Alfred Davidson; 18 October 1926 Newcastle, New South Wales
- Died: 1992 (aged 65–66) Brisbane
- School: Newcastle Tech High
- Occupation: Castrol CEO

Rugby union career
- Position: Prop forward
Amateur team(s)
Years	Team	Apps	(Points)
1945-46	Eastern Suburbs RUFC		
1947-58	Gordon RFC		
Provincial / State sides
Years	Team	Apps	(Points)
1952-58	NSW	16	
International career
Years	Team	Apps	(Points)
1952-58	Australia	13	

Robert Alfred Lewars Davidson (1926–1992) was an Australian rugby union footballer of the 1940s and 50s. A State and national representative prop-forward he made thirteen Test appearances and forty-nine additional tour match appearances for the Wallabies, captaining the national side in six Tests matches from 1957-58.

== Rugby career ==
Davidson attended Newcastle Technical High School and was school captain as well as rugby XV captain. He attended Sydney Teachers College from 1945–47 and played in the College's rugby team while training to become a science teacher. He joined the Gordon RFC in Sydney in 1947 making first-grade appearances from that year but cementing his place in the top-grade as a front-rower in 1949.

His representative debut came for NSW in 1952 when he selected to meet a touring Fijian side. His strong performance saw him elevated to the national side for the two Test series against those same visitors played in Sydney under captain John Solomon. For the next six years Davidson was a regular in the Australian pack. He made the 1952 tour to New Zealand playing in seven of the ten matches including the two Test matches against the All Blacks, the first of which the Wallabies won. He was selected for the 1953 tour to South Africa playing in fifteen games. He made only one Test appearance there of the four played, with selectors opting for Nick Shehadie and Colin Forbes up front.

In 1957 he was selected for two domestic Test matches against the visiting All Blacks and then later in the year was honoured with the captaincy of the touring squad for the epic eight month 1957–58 Australia rugby union tour of Britain, Ireland and France.

== Captaincy ==
Versatile back Dick Tooth had made ten Test appearances for Australia before the tour and had captained the Wallabies well in two 1957 Tests against the All Blacks. Howell expresses a view that it was inexplicable that Tooth was not selected for the tour and not named as captain and partially blames this for the disappointing tour result. However Howell also writes that Davidson possessed outstanding qualities to make him a natural touring captain. He was a born leader of men, was immensely popular, he met people well, was highly intelligent and spoke well in public. He played in thirty-two of the forty-one tour games and did everything in his power to make the tour a success. The Wallabies won twenty-two, lost sixteen and drew three of the matches played. They lost all five Tests of the tour under Davidson's captaincy.

On his return to Australia Davidson captained both New South Wales and the Wallabies matches in 1958 against the New Zealand Māori rugby union team before retiring at the end of that year.

On the club front he captained the Gordon RFC to Shute Shield first-grade premierships in 1952, 1956 and 1958. He was the coach of the club from 1956 till 1961 and was Club President for a period from 1964. He was Sports Master at North Sydney Technical High School from c1958 to (unknown).

Preceded by Dick Tooth	Australian national rugby union captain 1957-58	Succeeded by Des Connor

== Sources ==
=== Published references ===
- Howell, Max (2005) Born to Lead - Wallaby Test Captains, Celebrity Books, Auckland NZ
