= Bill Calcraft =

Australian rugby union international

- Full name: William Joseph Calcraft
- Born: 22 May 1960 (age 66) Surry Hills, Sydney, Australia

Rugby union career
- Position: Flanker
International career
Years	Team	Apps	(Points)
1985–86	Australia	3	(4)

Bill Calcraft (born 22 May 1960) is a former Australian rugby union player. He is Wallaby #648.

Calcraft, born in Sydney, is a nephew of Wallaby Bill Gunther and attended Scots College, after which he came through the Manly colts to feature in the club's 1983 Shute Shield-winning first-grade team. He played exactly 100 first grade matches for Sydney first division rugby club Manly DRFC.

A flanker, Calcraft captained the New South Wales tour of New Zealand 1984 (he is Waratah #1244) and was selected for both Wallaby tours that year. This included the Grand Slam tour of Britain and Ireland, where he played in 10 tour matches and was the captain against Pontypool. His Test debut came the following year against Canada and he was capped a further two times in 1986. His third and final tour for the Wallabies was with the 1986 Bledisloe Cup winning Wallaby tour to New Zealand. He also represented Australia at the 1986 Hong Kong Sevens.

He played 21 matches for the Wallabies on tours to Fiji, New Zealand, the UK and Ireland. He started in 3 tests and captained to Wallabies on a number of tour matches.

Calcraft then studied at Oxford University where he won two rugby blues against Cambridge, captained the OURFC and also played for the Barbarians during his time in England.

Bill Calcraft is also a former Investment Banker with UBS, and expert in renewable energy investment as managing director with Allianz Private equity and an experienced Board Director in UK, Europe and Australia.

== See also ==
- List of Australia national rugby union players
