= Dick Tooth =

Australian rugby union player (1929–2020)

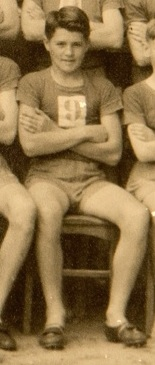
- Schoolboy Tooth, member of the Newcastle Boys High squad, winners of the 1943 CHS Kerr Cup and Lintott Cup
- Born: Richard Murray Tooth; 21 September 1929 Bombala, New South Wales, Australia
- Died: 5 August 2020 (aged 90) Sydney
- School: Newcastle Boys' High School
- University: University of Sydney MB BS (1955)
- Occupation: medical practitioner

Rugby union career
- Position: Versatile back
Amateur team(s)
Years	Team	Apps	(Points)
1949–56	Sydney Uni		
1957	Randwick		
1958	Rosslyn Park (UK)		
–	Middlesex		
International career
Years	Team	Apps	(Points)
1950–57	Australia	10	(21)

Richard Murray Tooth (21 September 1929 – 5 August 2020) was an Australian rugby union footballer of the 1950s. He represented the Wallabies in ten Test matches and nineteen total appearances and was Australian captain on two occasions. He resided at St Andrew's College while studying at Sydney University. His club rugby was played with the Sydney University Football Club and later with Randwick in the Shute Shield. He practised as an orthopaedic surgeon and was a sports medicine pioneer.

== Early life and education ==
Tooth was born in Bombala and his family relocated to Newcastle when he was seven years of age. He attended Newcastle Boys' High School and represented the school in rugby league, swimming (member of the 1943 Farlow Cup winning team) and athletics (member of the 1943 winning teams, CHS Juvenile Shield, Kerr and Lintott Cups). An all-round schoolboy athlete, he swam in the summer with the Cooks Hill Surf Life Saving Club.

While studying science at the University of Sydney and domiciled at St Andrew's College, Tooth played inter-collegiate rugby and grade rugby for the University. In 1949 he switched to medicine and at the same time cemented a spot in Sydney's University's 2nd grade side. From there he was selected in an Australian Universities XV who met a New Zealand Universities side for a three match series in 1949.

== Representative career ==
In 1950 he was a regular first grader at University, was coached by former Wallaby Joe Kraefft and played against a visiting British Isles side. In 1951 he was selected for New South Wales and made his debut for Australia with three Test appearances against the All Blacks at five-eighth marking the experienced All Black fly-half Laurie Haig.

He focussed on his studies for the next couple of years but in 1954 was back in the national side in a series of games against the visiting Fijians playing in one Test at fullback and another at centre. In 1955 he was selected in the Wallaby touring party to New Zealand captained by his University colleague John Solomon. He appeared in twelve of the thirteen tour games at either fullback or fly-half and had a sound tour.

In 1957 he captained the Wallabies on two occasions when the All Blacks toured Australia. It was a surprise when at the end of that season and as the current Australian captain, he was not selected in the 27-man Wallaby side to tour Britain, Ireland and France. Howell reports that his omission defied explanation given his positional versatility but Tooth took it in his stride and travelled himself to the United Kingdom at that time to continue his medical studies. While there he captained the Rosslyn Park club side in England, played for Middlesex and while a resident at a Belfast Hospital was selected in the invitational side the North of Ireland Wolfhounds.

== Orthopaedic Surgeon ==
Tooth helped pioneer arthroscopic surgery in Australia. In 1971, he performed the first full knee reconstruction in Australia; his patient was Johnny Warren, captain of the Socceroos who went on to captain them to the 1974 World Cup.

== Family life ==
In 1956 he married Marianne, the elder daughter of the Consul-General for Sweden, Ivar Stenstrom. Their daughter, Liane Tooth, is a double Olympic gold medallist.

His nephew Tim Walsh was a first grade rugby player with Leeds Carnegie and made a number of representative appearances for Australia at Rugby Sevens.

Preceded by Alan Cameron	Australian national rugby union captain 1957	Succeeded by Bob Davidson

== Sources ==
- Howell, Max (2005) Born to Lead – Wallaby Test Captains, Celebrity Books, Auckland NZ
