= Terry Curley =

Rugby player (1938–2016)

- Full name: Terrance George Paul Curley
- Born: 6 June 1938 Newcastle, NSW, Australia
- Died: 17 October 2016 (aged 78)

Rugby union career
- Position: Fullback
International career
Years	Team	Apps	(Points)
1957–58	Australia	11	(11)

Terrance George Paul Curley (6 June 1938 — 17 October 2016) was an Australian rugby union international.

Curley, a native of Newcastle, attended St Joseph's College, Hunters Hill and was captain of the 1st XV's 1955 GPS premiership team. He played his rugby afterwards for the Wanderers club of Newcastle.

A fullback, Curley was capped 11 times for the Wallabies, debuting against the All Blacks in Sydney at the age of 18. He played all five Tests on the 1957–58 tour of Britain, Ireland, France and North America, featuring in 34 of the 41 total matches. On his final Wallabies tour, to New Zealand in 1958, Curley was again ever present, playing all but one tour match. He had a large part in the win over the All Blacks in Christchurch.

Curley retired from rugby at age 20 to enter the Marist order.

== See also ==
- List of Australia national rugby union players
