= Cyril Davies (rugby union) =

Welsh rugby union player

- Full name: Cyril Allun Havard Davies
- Born: 21 November 1936 Ammanford, Wales
- Died: 21 July 2017 (aged 80) Ammanford, Wales
- Height: 5 ft 7 in (170 cm)

Rugby union career
- Position: Centre
International career
| Years | Team | Apps | (Points) |
| 1957–61 | Wales | 7 | (0) |

Cyril Allun Havard Davies (21 November 1936 — 21 July 2017) was a Welsh international rugby union player.

Born in Ammanford, Davies attended Amman Valley Grammar School and was a Wales Schools under-15s captain.

Davies, a centre, played his first-class rugby for Cardiff, Swansea and Llanelli. He won seven Wales caps in irregular appearances between 1957 and 1961, including a win against the visiting 1957/58 Wallabies side in Cardiff. Knee injuries plagued him during his career and a broken nose brought about his eventual retirement in 1964/65 season, having returned to his hometown club Ammanford, which he then served as coach.

== See also ==
- List of Wales national rugby union players
