= Jim Donaldson (rugby union) =

Rugby union player from Northern Ireland

- Full name: James Albert Donaldson
- Born: 16 September 1936 Belfast, Northern Ireland
- Died: 9 July 2015 (aged 78)

Rugby union career
- Position: Wing-forward
International career
Years	Team	Apps	(Points)
1958	Ireland	4	(0)

James Albert Donaldson (16 September 1936 — 9 July 2015) was an Irish international rugby union player.

Born in Belfast, Donaldson was the son of a Dunmurry Presbyterian Church minister and played his rugby as a wing-forward, earning Ulster Schools representative honours during his youth. He captained Collegians and was capped four times for Ireland in 1958, debuting in his team's win over the touring Wallabies at Lansdowne Road.

Donaldson served as chairman of selectors for Ulster.

== See also ==
- List of Ireland national rugby union players
