= Saxon White =

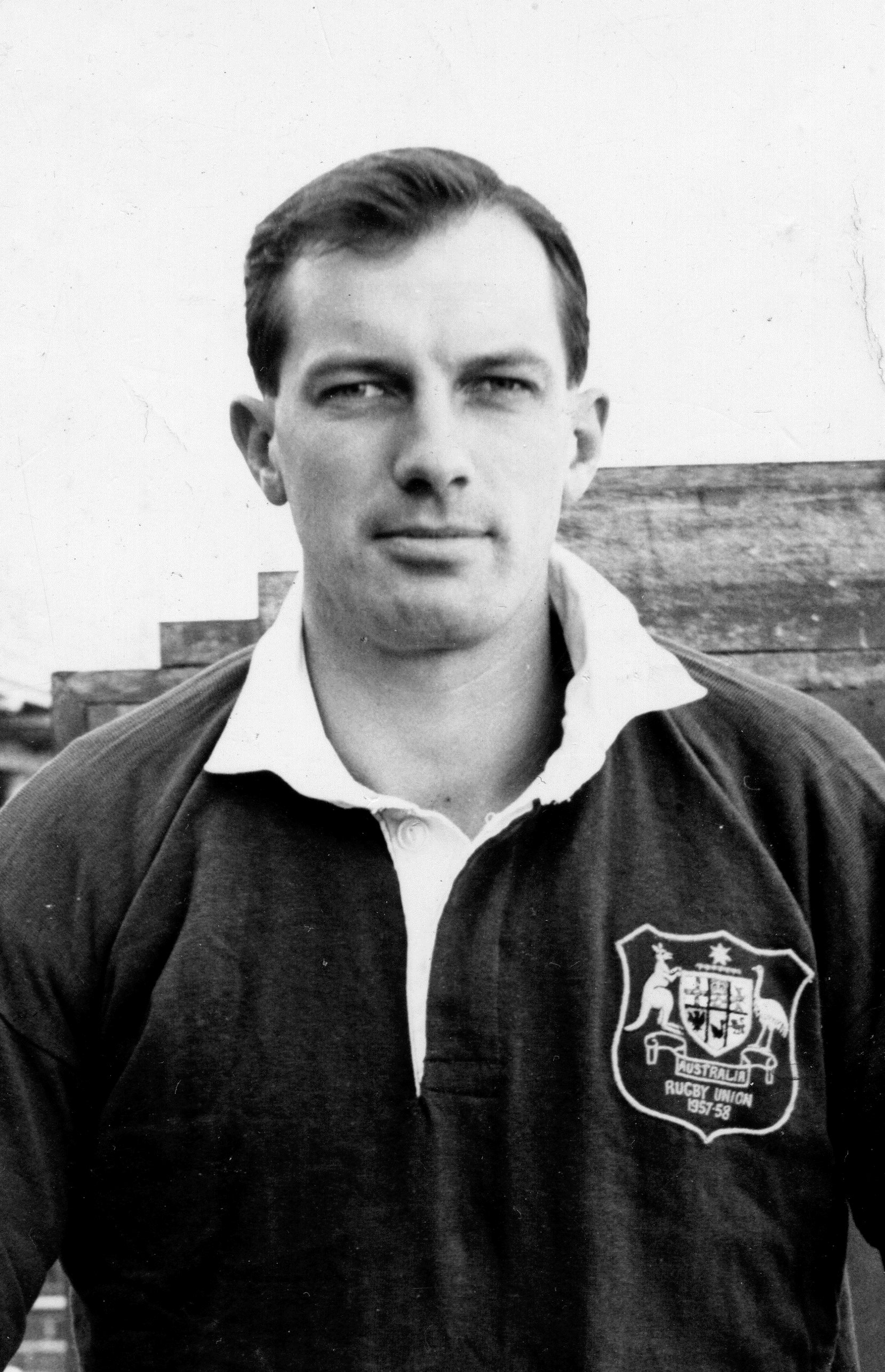
- White in 1957
- Born: Saxon William White; 9 March 1934 Sydney, New South Wales, Australia
- Died: 7 October 2025 (aged 91)
- School: The King's School
- University: University of Sydney
- Occupation: Medical professor

Rugby union career
Amateur team(s)
| Years | Team | Apps | (Points) |
- Sydney University
Provincial / State sides
| Years | Team | Apps | (Points) |
| 1953 | New South Wales | | |
International career
| Years | Team | Apps | (Points) |
| 1956–58 | Wallabies | 7 | (0) |

Saxon William White AM (9 March 1934 – 7 October 2025) was an Australian academic and national representative rugby union centre. He made a total of seven international rugby representative appearances for Australia. He was the Foundation Professor of Human Physiology at the University of Newcastle medical school from 1976 to 1999, and from 2000 he was Emeritus Professor at the University of Newcastle and an honorary professor at the Sydney University.

== Early life ==
White was born in Sydney on 9 March 1934. His father was in the Royal Australian Navy until 1946 when he joined the staff of The King's School, Parramatta. Saxon White was schooled at Woollahra Primary Opportunity Class, Sydney Boys' High School, Parramatta High School and King's completing in 1952.

== Rugby career ==
Having played rugby at High and at The King's School, (alongside future Wallaby teammate Peter Fenwicke), White continued whilst pursuing his medical studies and played for the Sydney University Football Club and St Andrew's College.

White made his representative debut for New South Wales in 1953 and that year aged just nineteen, he was selected in the Wallabies squad who toured South Africa in 1953. He played in no Tests on the tour. He played at centre in both Tests of 1956 against the South Africa rugby union team visiting Australia. He was selected to play against the All Blacks in 1957 but withdrew due to a knee injury. He was selected for the 1957–58 Australia rugby union tour of Britain, Ireland and France and played in three Test matches on the tour, before sustaining a severe head injury and being carried off in the match against Scotland. He played a further two Test matches against the New Zealand Māori in 1958. He also played 26 tour games for the Wallabies against provincial sides during his two tours to South Africa and the British Isles.

After injury and his time with the Wallabies, in 1967–68 White with Dr Tod Davis co-coached the first and second University of New South Wales rugby teams in their inaugural two seasons in the Premier Sydney Club Rugby Competition. He also played a season with Sydney's Lane Cove Rugby Club.

In his later years, White has told the story of his playing days to Theo Clark Media in documentaries for Lane Cove Rugby and Sydney University Football Club.

== Medical career ==
Following his rugby career, he worked as a lecturer in surgery at the University of New South Wales before completing a higher Doctorate in Medicine and becoming the Overseas Life Insurance Medical Research Fellow of Australia and New Zealand. He was a researcher of the neural control of the heart and lung circulations, training further during 1968 at the University of Gothenburg Sweden, and in 1969 at the University of California, San Diego. On returning to Australia in 1970 he became the Chapman Fellow in Cardiology at the University of Sydney. He later moved to the new medical school at Flinders University in South Australia, where he coached for one season the Flinders University rugby team to a Grand Final. Finally in 1976, he took the Foundation Chair of Human Physiology at the new medical school at the University of Newcastle, where he helped create the medical students' rugby team to play against his alma mater Sydney University medical students each year.

In the 2005 Queen's Birthday Honours White was appointed a Member of the Order of Australia (AM) for "service to medicine and to medical education, particularly through the planning and development of innovative curriculum, as a researcher in the field of human physiology, and to the Hunter Valley community".

== Death ==
White died on 7 October 2025, at the age of 91.
