= Dave Emanuel =

David Emanuel
- Full name: David Maurice Emanuel
- Born: 23 June 1934 Dover Heights, NSW, Australia
- Died: 21 February 2021 (aged 86)

Rugby union career
- Position: Lock
International career
Years	Team	Apps	(Points)
1957–58	Australia	9	(0)

David Maurice Emanuel (23 June 1934 — 21 February 2021) was an Australian rugby union international.

Emanuel, born in Sydney, was the only son of artist Cedric Emanuel. Educated at both Trinity Grammar School and Sydney Grammar School, he excelled at swimming in his youth, competing at the GPS Championships.

An Eastern Suburbs player, Emanuel gained Wallabies selection the first time for the 1955 tour of New Zealand, which he spent as reserve lock. His debut cap came in Brisbane two years later against the All Blacks, playing out of position as a back row forward. He appeared at lock in all five Tests of the 1957–58 tour of Britain, Ireland and France, then in a further three home Tests against the NZ Māori team, finishing his career with nine Wallabies caps.

Emanuel, who was Jewish, is a member of the Maccabi Hall of Fame.

== See also ==
- List of Australia national rugby union players
