= Ron Syrett =

England international rugby union player (1931–2018)

- Full name: Ronald Edward Syrett
- Born: 5 January 1931 Amersham, England
- Died: 20 May 2018 (aged 87) Beaconsfield, England
- School: Royal Grammar School

Rugby union career
- Position: Flanker
International career
Years	Team	Apps	(Points)
1958–62	England	11	(3)

Ronald Edward Syrett (5 January 1931 - 20 May 2018) was an English international rugby union player.

Syrett, the son of a butcher, grew up in Buckinghamshire and was educated at Wycombe Royal Grammar School.

A flanker, Syrett earned 11 England caps and was part of a Five Nations Championship title win in 1958. He made representative appearances for London Counties and Middlesex, while playing his club rugby with Wasps.

Syrett married the sister of England winger Ted Woodward. His younger brother, Dennis Syrett, was goalkeeper on the Wycombe Wanderers side that contested the 1957 FA Amateur Cup final at Wembley.

== See also ==
- List of England national rugby union players
