= Gordon Wells =

Gordon Thomas
- Full name: Gordon Thomas Wells
- Born: 25 October 1928 Ynyshir, Wales
- Died: 21 April 1995 (aged 66) Westminster, England

Rugby union career
- Position: Centre / Wing
International career
Years	Team	Apps	(Points)
1955–58	Wales	7	(3)

Gordon Thomas Wells (25 October 1928 — 21 April 1995) was a Welsh international rugby union player.

Wells was born in Ynyshir in the Rhondda Valley and attended Porth Grammar Technical School. He was a Welsh triple jump champion, considered a British Olympic hopeful, before concentrating on rugby.

A three-quarter, Wells won seven Wales caps from 1955 to 1958, four as a centre and three on the wing. He was a Cardiff captain and scored two tries in their 1957 win over the touring Wallabies, finishing with 254 club games. Representing the Barbarians, Wells took part in overseas tours to Canada and South Africa.

Wells worked in the oil industry.

== See also ==
- List of Wales national rugby union players
