= James Victor Brown =

Australian rugby union player (1935–2020)

Jim Brown
- Born: James Victor Brown; 5 June 1935 Sydney, New South Wales, Australia
- Died: 14 July 2020 (aged 85) Newcastle, New South Wales
- School: Newington College

Rugby union career
- Position: Hooker
International career
Years	Team	Apps	(Points)
1957–1958	Australia	9	

James Victor Brown (5 June 1935 – 14 July 2020) was an Australian rugby union player who played for the Australian national team nine times.

== Early life ==
Brown was born in Sydney and attended Newington College (1947–1951) from where he was selected to play rugby in the GPS 1st XV. Post school he became a member of Randwick pack as hooker joining Nick Shehadie.

== Representative career ==
At the age of twenty, Brown was selected to represent New South Wales against Queensland. The following year he played in his first test match against South Africa. He retired from representative rugby after the 1957–58 Australia rugby union tour of Britain, Ireland and France. He was known for his fiery personality and was on one occasion sent off during training by the Australian coach, Denis Cowper, a fellow Old Newingtonian.
