= Don Logan (rugby union) =

- Born: Donald Leonard Logan; 30 January 1931 Sydney, Australia
- Died: 30 September 2003 (aged 72)

Rugby union career
- Position: scrum-half
International career
Years	Team	Apps	(Points)
1958	Wallabies	1	(0)

Donald Leonard Logan (30 January 1931 – 30 September 2003) was a rugby union player who represented Australia.

Logan, a scrum-half, was born in Sydney and claimed 1 international rugby cap for Australia on the Wallabies' 1957–58 Australia rugby union tour of Britain, Ireland and France.

Logan died on 30 September 2003, at the age of 72.
