= James Stevenson (rugby union) =

Rugby union player from Northern Ireland

- Full name: James Burton Stevenson
- Born: 28 August 1928 Belfast, Northern Ireland
- Died: 29 May 2020 (aged 91) Lisburn, Northern Ireland

Rugby union career
- Position: Lock
International career
Years	Team	Apps	(Points)
1958	Ireland	5	(0)

James Burton Stevenson (28 August 1928 — 29 May 2020) was an Irish international rugby union player.

Stevenson was born in Belfast and educated at the Royal Belfast Academical Institution.

A lock forward, Stevenson captained Instonians and made his international debut against the touring Wallabies in 1958, performing well in an Ireland win. He appeared in all of Ireland's 1958 Five Nations fixtures, to finish with five caps.

Stevenson remained involved in rugby as an administrator and served as president of Ulster. He was a teacher by profession, with musician Van Morrison one of his students during his time at Orangefield Boys' Secondary School, before serving as principal at both Knockbreda Primary School and Belvoir Park Primary School.

In 2020, Stevenson died from COVID-19 in Lisburn, aged 91.

== See also ==
- List of Ireland national rugby union players
