= Greg Cornelsen =

Australian rugby union player (born 1952)

- Born: 29 August 1952 (age 74) Sydney, Australia
- Notable relative: Jack Cornelsen (son)

Rugby union career
- Position: Flanker
International career
Years	Team	Apps	(Points)
1974-1982	Wallabies	25	(16)

Greg Cornelsen (born 29 August 1952 in Sydney) is a former Australian rugby union footballer who was capped 25 times for the national team, the Wallabies, from 1974 to 1982. His usual position was flanker. His son Jack Cornelsen is an international for Japan.

== Career ==
Greg played Australian schoolboys rugby in 1969. The team toured South Africa at the invitation of Danie Craven. Greg was one of two boys selected in this team from The Armidale School - the other was Brian Hayward.

Cornelsen made his international debut for Australia at 21 years of age, when the Wallabies took on the All Blacks in 1974 in Brisbane, which resulted in a 16-all draw. He was subsequently capped in the following match in Sydney, in which the All Blacks won 16 to 6. He next played for Australia against Japan in Brisbane, which the Wallabies won 50 to 25. Over the following two seasons, he played in matches against Scotland, Wales, England and France; all were in Europe and the Wallabies had a tougher time winning.

In 1978, Cornelsen played two matches against the Welsh in Australia, both of which the Wallabies won. They then faced the All Blacks in a three test series. After Australia lost the opening two matches in Wellington and Christchurch, they faced a 3-0 whitewash if they lost the final game at Eden Park in Auckland. In one of Cornelsen's greatest moments, he scored four tries in the third test, seeing Australia through to a 30-16 victory, as well as ending a long string of losses against the Kiwis. He was also the first forward from any country to score four tries in a major Test (i.e., involving two traditional top-tier nations) since 1881, and to this day remains the only Wallabies forward with four tries in a Test.

The following year he played another five tests for Australia, the first of which were two losses against Ireland at home, though the Wallabies then went on to defeat the All Blacks again, at home in Sydney. Cornelsen also played in the two tests against Argentina in Buenos Aires. The series was tied 1 game each. In 1980 the Wallabies hosted the All Blacks for a three tests series. Australia entered the third game with the series at 1 each, winning the final game 26-10 in Sydney. Cornelsen was then capped on the 1981-82 Wallaby tour to Europe against Ireland, Wales, Scotland and England and his long test career came to a close in defeat 11-15 at the home of English rugby, Twickenham.

== Honours ==
Cornelsen was inducted into the Rugby Australia Hall of Fame in 2017, alongside his former Wallaby coach David Brockhoff.
