= George Hastings (rugby union) =

England international rugby union player

- Full name: George William Hastings
- Born: 7 November 1924 Dursley, Gloucs, England
- Died: 30 December 2019 (aged 95)
- School: Cheltenham Grammar School

Rugby union career
- Position: Prop
Senior career
Years	Team	Apps	(Points)
1948–59	Gloucester	260	
International career
Years	Team	Apps	(Points)
1955–58	England	13	(11)

George William Hastings (7 November 1924 – 30 December 2019) was an English international rugby union player.

The son of a policeman, Hastings was born in Dursley, Gloucestershire, and educated at Cheltenham Grammar School.

Hastings was a versatile forward, most often utilised as a prop, who excelled in open play with his speed and mobility. He made his Gloucester debut in 1948 and gained regular selection for Gloucestershire through his career, making 34 appearances. In 1953–54, Hastings represented a Western Counties representative team against the touring All Blacks. He took over as Gloucester club captain for a season in 1954–55.

From 1955 to 1958, Hasting was capped 13 times for England. He played all four matches of England's Grand Slam-winning 1957 Five Nations side. A capable goal-kicker, Hastings slotted the penalty which gave England a 3–3 draw against Scotland, securing the 1958 Five Nations title.

== See also ==
- List of England national rugby union players
