= Eric Tindall =

- Born: Eric Norton Tindall; 28 August 1944 Sydney

Rugby union career
- Position: scrum-half
International career
Years	Team	Apps	(Points)
1973	Wallabies	1	(4)

Eric Norton Tindall (born 28 August 1944) was a rugby union player who represented Australia.

Tindall, a scrum-half, was born in Sydney and claimed 1 international rugby cap for Australia.
