= 1957–58 Scottish Inter-District Championship =

Rugby union competition

- Countries: Scotland
- Date: 1957–58
- Champions: South / Edinburgh District
- Runners-up: Glasgow District
- Matches played: 6

The 1957–58 Scottish Inter-District Championship was a rugby union competition for Scotland's district teams.

This season saw the fifth formal Scottish Inter-District Championship.

South and Edinburgh District won the competition with two wins and a draw each.

== 1957-58 League Table ==
Team	P	W	D	L	PF	PA	+/-	Pts
South	3	2	1	0	55	23	+32	5
Edinburgh District	3	2	1	0	42	23	+19	5
Glasgow District	3	1	0	2	34	29	+5	2
North and Midlands	3	0	0	3	17	73	-56	0

== Results ==
Date	Try	Conversion	Penalty	Dropped goal	Goal from mark	Notes
1948–1970	3 points	2 points	3 points	3 points	3 points	

=== Round 1 ===
18 October 1957

Edinburgh District	11 – 11	South
	Preview; Report

Inverleith
Referee: A. M. Nicol (Glasgow Academicals)

Edinburgh District:
South:

=== Round 2 ===
2 November 1957

North and Midlands	3 – 32	South
	Preview; Report

Referee: J. A. Cessford (Hillhead HSFP)

South:
North and Midlands:

=== Round 3 ===
16 November 1957

Glasgow District	19 – 8	North and Midlands
	Preview; Report

Referee: J. Inglis (Hawick)

Glasgow District:
North and Midlands:

=== Round 4 ===
30 November 1957

Glasgow District	6 – 9	Edinburgh District
	Preview; Report

Referee: G. Burrell (Gala)

Glasgow District:
Edinburgh District:

=== Round 5 ===
18 January 1958

North and Midlands	6 – 22	Edinburgh District
	Preview; Report

Referee: R. P. Burrell (Gala)

North and Midlands:
Edinburgh District:

18 January 1958

South	12 – 9	Glasgow District
	Preview; Report

Referee: I. J. Morrison (Stewart's College F.P.)

South:
Glasgow District:

== Matches outwith the Championship ==
=== Other Scottish matches ===
30 October 1957

Rest of the West	–	Glasgow District

Rest of the West:
Glasgow District:

26 November 1957

North of Scotland District	–	Midlands District

North of Scotland District:
Midlands District:

=== Junior matches ===
12 October 1957

Edinburgh	–	South

Edinburgh District:
South of Scotland District:

9 November 1957

West	6 – 8	East
	Report

West:
East:

=== Trial matches ===
14 December 1957

Blues Trial	6 – 21	Whites Trial
	Report

Murrayfield Stadium

Blues Trial:
Whites Trial:

28 December 1957

Scotland Probables	13 – 13	Scotland Possibles
	Report

Murrayfield Stadium

Probables:
Possibles:

=== English matches ===
25 December 1957

Northumberland	–	Edinburgh District

Newcastle

Northumberland:
Edinburgh District:

=== International matches ===
4 December 1957

Cities District	3 – 9	Australia

Murrayfield Stadium

Cities District:
Australia:

7 December 1957

South of Scotland District	6 – 12	Australia

Mansfield Park, Hawick

South of Scotland District:
Australia:

14 February 1958

North of Scotland District	3 – 6	Australia

Linksfield Stadium, Aberdeen

North of Scotland District:
Australia:
