= Jack Potts =

Australian rugby union international

- Full name: John Maxwell Potts
- Born: 21 February 1936 Tenterfield, NSW, Australia
- Died: 1 June 2023 (aged 87)
- Height: 182 cm (6 ft 0 in)

Rugby union career
- Position: Centre
International career
| Years | Team | Apps | (Points) |
| 1957–59 | Australia | 5 | (0) |

John Maxwell Potts (21 February 1936 — 1 June 2023) was an Australian rugby union international.

Potts, a Waverley College product, played rugby for Sydney University while studying law and in 1956 was a member of the Australian Universities team that toured Japan.

A tall centre who had a high striding gait, Potts was capped five times for the Wallabies, beginning with two Tests against the visiting All Blacks in 1957. He gained a further two caps on the 1957–58 tour of Britain, Ireland and France, then in 1959 played against the British Lions in Brisbane.

Potts was the first-grade coach of Sydney University in 1975.

== See also ==
- List of Australia national rugby union players
