= Alan Cameron (rugby union) =

Australia international rugby union player

- Born: Alan Stewart Cameron; 18 November 1929 Narrandera, New South Wales, Australia
- Died: 20 March 2010 (aged 80) Sydney
- School: Newington College
- Occupation: Stock Auctioneer

Rugby union career
- Position: Second Row
Amateur team(s)
Years	Team	Apps	(Points)
- St George
Provincial / State sides
Years	Team	Apps	(Points)
1948–1957	NSW	26	
International career
Years	Team	Apps	(Points)
1951–58	Australia	20	

Alan Stewart Cameron (18 November 1929 – 20 March 2010) was an Australian rugby union footballer of the 1950s and 1960s. A State and national representative lock-forward he made twenty Test appearances and over fifty additional tour match appearances for the Wallabies, captaining the national side in four Tests matches.

== Rugby career ==
Cameron attended Newington College from 1945 to 1948 and was selected in the GPS combined team in 1946 and 1947. After school he joined the St George Rugby Union Football Club and would go on to play 266 games for the club. In his debut year in grade and after only five club matches he was selected in the New South Wales Waratahs side to meet Queensland in the annual inter-state series. He made twenty-six State representative appearances between 1948 and 1957.

He made his international representative debut for the Wallabies against the All Blacks in Sydney in June 1951 debuting alongside other future Test captains in Dick Tooth and Keith Winning and played in all three Tests of that series. For the next five-year he was an automatic selection in Australian Test sides and touring squads and he formed a formidable second-row partnership with Nick Shehadie controlling the Australian line-out and ever working hard in the tight forward play. He toured New Zealand twice (1952 and 1955), South Africa in 1953 and Europe and America on the 1957–58 Australia rugby union tour of Britain, Ireland and France. He usually played in a high proportion of all the tour matches as well as the Tests. At home he played in Test series against visiting All Blacks sides in 1951 and 1957, Fiji in 1952 and 1954 and the South Africa in 1956.

== Captaincy ==
On the 1952 tour to New Zealand he played in nine of the total ten matches including both Tests. At aged twenty-two he was honoured with the Australian captaincy in a mid-week match against King Country. In South Africa in 1953 he played in sixteen tour matches as well as the four Tests, captaining Australia twice in tour matches. On the 1955 New Zealand tour he played in twelve of the thirteen total matches and was formally recognised as the squad's vice-captain under John Solomon. After Solomon suffered an injury, Cameron debuted as Australian Test captain in the second Test at Dunedin in September 1955. He held the captaincy for the third Test which saw a Wallaby victory at Eden Park. In 1956 when the Springboks visited Australia for a two Test series he was the captain for both. He made a further Test appearance against Ireland in 1957 and then was one of the senior players selected for the 1957–58 Wallaby tour. Tony Miller's form was on the ascendancy at that time and Cameron held his Test lock position for only the Test against Ireland, but he played in twenty-one other matches of the forty-match tour and captained the side in seven of those.

Preceded by Nicholas Shehadie	Australian national rugby union captain 1955–56	Succeeded by Dick Tooth

== Published references ==
- Howell, Max (2005) Born to Lead – Wallaby Test Captains, Celebrity Books, Auckland NZ
