= Jim Phipps (rugby union) =

- Full name: James Alfred Phipps
- Born: 31 December 1931 Batavia, Java, Dutch East Indies
- Died: 22 October 2021 (aged 89)
- School: Barker College
- Occupation: Farmer

Rugby union career
- Position: Centre
International career
| Years | Team | Apps | (Points) |
| 1953–56 | Australia | 11 | (3) |

James Alfred Phipps (31 December 1931 — 22 October 2021) was an Australian rugby union international.

== Biography ==
Phipps, son of a tea merchant, was born in Batavia in the Dutch East Indies. At the beginning of World War II, the Phipps family left for Sydney and lived in the now heritage listed Briars estate in the suburb of Wahroonga. He was educated at Barker College along with his three brothers, Bob, John and Peter, who all played first-grade rugby for Gordon.

An outside centre, Phipps made his first-grade debut for Gordon in the 1950 grand final loss to Manly. He was capped 11 times for the Wallabies between 1953 and 1956, without missing a Test match. After debuting on the 1953 tour of South Africa, he played a home series against Fiji in 1954, then the following year toured New Zealand and had his brother Peter as a centre partner for some of the uncapped tour matches. His final Test appearances were at home against the Springboks in 1956. He was on the 1957–58 tour of Britain, Ireland and France, but broke his leg in an early fixture and was ruled out of the international fixtures.

== See also ==
- List of Australia national rugby union players
