= John Collins (rugby union, born 1931) =

- Full name: John Ernest Collins
- Born: 16 January 1931 Aberavon, Wales
- Died: 9 May 2017 (aged 86) Port Talbot, Wales

Rugby union career
- Position: Wing three–quarter
International career
Years	Team	Apps	(Points)
1958–61	Wales	10	(9)

John Ernest Collins (16 January 1931 – 9 May 2017) was a Welsh international rugby union player.

Collins was born in Aberavon and educated at St Joseph's School, where he picked up rugby.

A speedy player, Collins was the 1952 Welsh 440 yards national champion, making his well suited to a place on the wing with Aberavon RFC, for which he scored 122 tries over the years. He also played some rugby in England for Devonport Services, while on national service with the Royal Marines, and earned Barbarian representative honours.

Collins was capped 10 times for Wales between 1958 and 1961. He debuted against the Wallabies at Cardiff Arms Park and scored Wales's only try in a 9–3 win, before featuring in four Five Nations campaigns. In 1960, Collins also appeared against the Springboks in a match for a combined Neath and Aberavon team.

Outside of rugby, Collins worked as a steel erector at Margam Abbey Steelworks and later ran a bar in Majorca.

== See also ==
- List of Wales national rugby union players
