= David Brockhoff =

Australian rugby union player (1928–2011)

Dave Brockhoff
- Born: John David Brockhoff; 8 June 1928 Sydney
- Died: 17 June 2011 (aged 83)
- School: The Scots College
- University: University of Sydney
- Occupation(s): Coach, Administrator, businessman

Rugby union career
- Position: Flanker
International career
Years	Team	Apps	(Points)
1949–51	Australia	8	(6)
Coaching career
- Years: Team
- 1974–76, 79: Australia
- 1970–71,73–74, 78: New South Wales
- 1967–73: Sydney Uni

John David "Brock" Brockhoff (8 June 1928 – 17 June 2011) was an Australian rugby union identity, a state and national representative who played eight Tests as flanker between 1949 and 1951. He was later coach of the national team from 1974 to 1976, and in 1979. He maintained an active involvement in rugby union in Australia for his entire life.

== Early life ==
Born at Rose Bay in Sydney, Brockoff was educated at The Scots College where he played in the first XV for his three senior years. He attended St. Andrew's College at the University of Sydney. His family were successful in the flour milling business in Sydney and he was very successful in the biscuit industry.

== Playing career ==
He attended Sydney University, where gained blues in rugby union through four consecutive years from 1948 to 1951, playing 95 games for the Sydney Uni Football Club before he joined Eastern Suburbs in 1953. His career was played at flanker.

He played eight Tests for the Wallabies between 1949 and 1951, touring with the side in Britain and South Africa. In the 1949 tour to New Zealand he played in 10 of the 12 matches, including both Tests which were won by Australia. The latter tour was his last with the Wallabies and he did not feature in the test side on that tour. He made a total of twenty-five appearances for the Australian national side. After concluding his Test career, he continued to play for Eastern Suburbs until 1961.

== Coaching career ==
Brockhoff began coaching at Eastern Suburbs in 1963 and guided them to a fourth grade premiership win in his first season as a coach. He became the first grade coach of Sydney Uni Football Club in 1967, a position he held for eight seasons, winning three premierships. Brockhoff coached New South Wales in three stints from 1970–71, 1973–74 and 1978.

His coaching philosophy was based on an aggressive, dominant forward pack that was brutal at the ruck and scrum in combination with an accurate kicker at five-eighth. Brockhoff was known for firing-up his players with stirring verbal imagery of what the team needed to do such as "make every line-out a dockyard brawl", and use the "famous Vickers machine-gun tripod defence".

After the 1974 season, he was appointed coach of Australia. Brockhoff achieved victory in his first Test series in 1975 when the Wallabies defeated England in two fiery matches at Sydney and Brisbane, and he went on to guide the side to two further series clean-sweeps at home against Japan and Fiji. He was renowned in this period as the man who had instilled renewed pride in the Wallaby jersey.

Brockhoff had a sometimes testy relationship with other Australian rugby administrators due to his confrontational style and as a result of coaching his sides to be abrasive and aggressive. He coached the Wallabies on the 1975–76 tour of Britain and Ireland, although he was banned from talking to the media. The ARFU had made it a priority to ensure the tour was an off-field success after media recriminations and accusations of unsavoury play following the England series in Australia. The Wallabies lost against three of the home nations on the tour before gaining wins against Ireland and the United States on the way home. Brockhoff was replaced as coach by Bob Templeton in June 1976.

He was recalled to the Australian coaching position for the 1979 season, after incumbent Daryl Haberecht had stepped down. The final match of his tenure came in memorable circumstances when Australia beat New Zealand 12–6 in a one-off Test at the Sydney Cricket Ground to regain the Bledisloe Cup. The vision of Brockhoff grabbing the Bledisloe Cup and running around the perimeter of the SCG is one of the lasting images in Australian rugby history. From this match onwards the Wallabies became much harder to beat than previously.

== Later life ==
After coaching, Brockhoff continued to be active in New South Wales and Australian rugby. He frequently attended training sessions for both sides, and when the teams travelled on tour he would often go to Sydney Airport to wish them well on departure and welcome them home on return. He was elected a life member of the Australian Rugby Union in 2004.

He died on 17 June 2011 in his 83rd year and was survived by his wife Claire, daughter Juliet and sons Peter and John. David's wife, Claire, died four years later in July 2015.

== Honours ==
Brockhoff was inducted into the Rugby Australia Hall of Fame in 2017, alongside Greg Cornelsen.

== Sources ==
- Growden, Greg (2010). Inside the Wallabies. Read How You Want. ISBN 978-1-74175-970-9.
- McGregor, Malcolm (1985). Paul McLean. University of Queensland Press. ISBN 0-7022-1885-5.

Preceded by Daryl Haberecht	Australia National Rugby Union Coach; 1979	Succeeded by Bob Templeton
Preceded by Bob Templeton	Australia National Rugby Union Coach; 1974–1976	Succeeded by Bob Templeton
