= Jack Cornelsen =

Japan international rugby union player

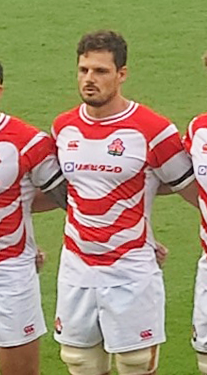
- Cornelsen with Japan in 2026
- Born: 13 October 1994 (age 32) Gold Coast, Queensland, Australia
- Height: 1.95 m (6 ft 5 in)
- Weight: 110 kg (243 lb; 17 st 5 lb)
- Notable relative: Greg Cornelsen (father)

Rugby union career
- Position(s): Number 8, Lock, Flanker
- Current team: Panasonic Wild Knights
Senior career
| Years | Team | Apps | (Points) |
| 2015–2016 | Queensland Country | 9 | (762) |
| 2018– | Panasonic Wild Knights | 114 | (175) |
- Correct as of 28 August 2023
International career
| Years | Team | Apps | (Points) |
| 2021– | Japan | 41 | (5) |
| 2023 | Japan XV | 2 | (0) |
- Correct as of 28 August 2023

Jack Cornelsen (ジャック・コーネルセン, Jakku Kōnerusen; born 13 October 1994) is a professional rugby union player who plays as a number eight for Japan Rugby League One club Saitama Wild Knights. Born in Australia, he represents Japan at international level after qualifying on residency grounds. He is the son of former Australian international player Greg Cornelsen.

== International career ==
Cornelsen received his first call-up to his adopted country's wider training squad in April 2021, ahead of British and Irish Lions test. On 24 May, he was named in the 36-man squad for the match against the Sunwolves and tour of Scotland and Ireland. Cornelsen qualified for Japan on residency in November 2020.
