= David Marques =

British Lions & England international rugby union player

- Born: Reginald William David Marques; 9 December 1932 Ware, Hertfordshire, England
- Died: 29 September 2010 (aged 77)
- School: Yardley Court; Tonbridge School
- University: Cambridge University

Rugby union career
- Position: Lock
Senior career
Years	Team	Apps	(Points)
- Army
1956–1958	Cambridge University R.U.F.C.		
1956–1958	Barbarian F.C.		
1958–1969	Harlequin F.C.		
International career
Years	Team	Apps	(Points)
1956–61	England	23	(3)
1959	British Lions	2	(0)

Reginald William David Marques (9 December 1932 – 29 September 2010) was an English rugby union international lock forward. At club level he represented Cambridge University, the Army and most notably Harlequin F.C. He played international rugby with England and in 1959 he was selected to tour New Zealand and Australia with the British Lions.

== Personal history ==
Marques was born in Ware, Hertfordshire in 1932, and was educated at Yardley Court and Tonbridge School where he played in the rugby first XV alongside Colin Cowdrey. Marques completed his national service with the Royal Engineers before matriculating to Cambridge University. After retiring from rugby he joined the family firm making street lights.

David Marques was the brother of Robin Marques.

In 1964 Marques was a member of the 1964 America's Cup challenger team, aboard the Sovereign. He was also a magistrate, a governor for Haileybury College and a church warden for 23 years. He was married with three children.

== Playing career ==
Marques came to note as a rugby player when he represented Cambridge University, playing in four Varsity Matches. He later played for the Army, but it was for his eleven years spent with Harlequins that he was best known. In 1956 he was selected to play for invitational tourists the Barbarians, playing against the 1958 Australians and then travelled with the Barbarians on their tours to Canada and East Africa. 1956 was also the year in which Marques was first selected to play for the England national team, facing Wales as part of the 1956 Five Nations Championship.

Marques played a total of 23 matches for England, including two touring parties, the 1958 Australians and the 1961 South Africans. During the 1957 Five Nations Championship and 1958 Five Nations Championship Marques became a member of two Grand Slam winning teams. As a forward player, Marques was never in the position to be a prolific scorer, but he scored his one and only international try in the 1960 encounter with Ireland. In 1959 he was chosen to tour Australia and New Zealand with the British Lions. He played in 18 matches of the tour, including two Tests, the Second Test against Australia and Second Test versus New Zealand.

Marques made an impression on the British Lions tour from the moment he arrived. When he stepped off the plane on its arrival at Australia, he was dressed as a stereotypical British gent in white shirt, military tie, dark suit, bowler hat and rolled umbrella. Another event of the tour that showed Marques's personality was when he was kicked in the face during an off-the-ball incident by Albie Pryor. Instead of retaliating, he got to his feet and shook his aggressor's hand; when he was asked by fellow Lion, Bill Mulcahy, why he hadn't punched Pryor, Marques replied, "You wouldn’t understand, Bill. I wanted him to feel a cad."
