= Paddy Berkery =

Irish rugby union player

- Full name: Patrick Joseph Berkery
- Born: 3 February 1929 Clonmel, Co. Tipperary, Ireland
- Died: 3 May 2013 (aged 84)
- School: Crescent College

Rugby union career
- Position: Fullback
International career
| Years | Team | Apps | (Points) |
| 1954–58 | Ireland | 11 | (5) |

Patrick Joseph Berkery (3 February 1929 — 3 May 2013) was an Irish international rugby union player.

Born in Clonmel, County Tipperary, Berkery moved to Limerick with his family aged ten and attended Crescent College. He was captain of the Crescent College XV that won their first ever Munster Schools Senior Cup title in 1947, then got his start in senior rugby with Old Crescent RFC, serving as their inaugural captain.

Berkery was named by All Black Bob Scott as the best fullback he saw over the course of their 1953–54 tour, after facing his opposite number playing with Munster. He subsequently broke into the Ireland side, winning 11 caps between 1954 and 1958. His Ireland career included a win over the Wallabies. He captained Lansdowne in the 1956–57 season.

== See also ==
- List of Ireland national rugby union players
