= Peter Fenwicke =

Australia international rugby union player (1932–1987)

- Born: Peter Thomas Fenwicke; 14 November 1932 Walcha, NSW
- Died: 25 April 1987 (aged 54)
- Height: 6 ft 2 in (188 cm)
- Weight: 13 st 7 lb (86 kg)
- School: The King's School
- Occupation: Grazier

Rugby union career
- Position: Flanker
Amateur team(s)
Years	Team	Apps	(Points)
1951-63	Walcha Rugby Club		
Provincial / State sides
Years	Team	Apps	(Points)
1951–??	New England		
1957-59	New South Wales	9	
International career
Years	Team	Apps	(Points)
1957–1959	Australia	6	(0)

Peter Thomas Fenwicke (14 November 1932 – 25 April 1987) was an Australian national representative rugby union flanker and national captain. He toured with the Wallabies on the 1957–58 Australia rugby union tour of Britain, Ireland and France.

== Playing career ==
Fenwicke was born in Walcha, New South Wales and attended primary school there. After making a success of schoolboy rugby at The King's School, Parramatta, Peter Fenwicke returned to Walcha in country New South Wales and at 17 in 1951, he was made captain of the Walcha Rugby Club, a position he held until his retirement in 1963. He was selected in a regional New England side who met the touring All Blacks in 1951 and he later captained the New England side in 1954 when they hosted the visiting Fijian national side. Fenwicke was a goal-kicking flanker at the Walcha club, who for seven consecutive seasons from 1951 was the club's highest point scorer and winner of the season's best & fairest trophy.

Fenwicke was first selected for New South Wales against the All Blacks in 1957 and he made his representative debut for Australia in a Test against those same NZ visitors in Sydney. He was selected for the 1957–58 Australia rugby union tour of Britain, Ireland and France and played in nineteen matches on tour including Tests against Wales, Ireland and England

From 1958 Fenwicke was a regular starter in the New South Wales rugby union team, he captained the side from 1959 and there were five straights wins under his leadership against Queensland and the visiting British & Irish Lions. His two matches as national captain were against the British & Irish Lions during their tour to Australia in 1959. Both matches were lost.

His final representative appearances were for New South Wales Country in 1960 (v All Blacks) and for Northern New South Wales and an Australian Barbarians side in 1961 (v Fiji).

== Later life ==
Fenwicke raised lambs on his property in Walcha. He was involved in Junior Rugby Union and Country Rugby Union and died after cancer at age 54.

Preceded by Charles Wilson	Australian national rugby union captain 1959	Succeeded by Ken Catchpole
