= Ron Harvey (rugby union) =

Australian rugby union player and cricketer

- Born: Ronald Mason Harvey; 26 October 1933 Waratah, New South Wales

Rugby union career
- Position: fly-half
International career
Years	Team	Apps	(Points)
1958	Wallabies	2	(0)

Ronald Mason Harvey (26 October 1933) was a rugby union player who represented Australia.

Harvey, a fly-half, was born in Waratah, New South Wales and claimed a total of 2 international rugby caps for Australia.

He also played a single first-class cricket match for New South Wales as a right-handed batsman.

== See also ==
- List of New South Wales representative cricketers
