= Ted Woodward (rugby union) =

England international rugby union player

- Full name: John Edward Woodward
- Born: 17 April 1931 Wycombe, Bucks, England
- Died: 16 January 2017 (aged 85) Harefield, London, England
- Height: 6 ft 1 in (185 cm)
- Weight: 15 st (210 lb; 95 kg)
- School: Royal Grammar School
- Notable relative: Ron Syrett (brother-in-law)
- Occupation: Butcher

Rugby union career
- Position: Wing
International career
Years	Team	Apps	(Points)
1952–56	England	15	(21)

John Edward Woodward (17 April 1931 – 16 January 2017) was an English international rugby union player.

== Early life ==
Raised in Lane End, Buckinghamshire, Woodward was the son of a butcher and picked up rugby during his time at Royal Grammar School, High Wycombe, having previously been an England schools representative footballer.

== Rugby career ==
Woodward, at 6 ft 1 in and 15 st, was significantly larger than most wing three-quarters of his day and still possessed enough pace to be a schoolboy sprint champion. He played his rugby with Wasps and as a teenager scored a hat-trick of tries to hand them victory in the 1948 Middlesex Sevens final against Harlequins. From 1952 to 1956, Woodward gained 15 England caps, debuting as a 20-year-old. He scored six tries for England, including two in their unbeaten 1953 Five Nations-winning campaign.

== Personal life ==
Woodward was the brother-in-law of England flanker Ron Syrett, through his sister Jean.

== See also ==
- List of England national rugby union players
