= Eddie Purkiss =

- Born: Edwin Maurice Purkiss; 27 July 1934 Grafton, New South Wales
- Died: 15 January 2008 (aged 73)

Rugby union career
- Position: flanker
International career
Years	Team	Apps	(Points)
1958	Wallabies	2	(0)

Edwin Maurice "Eddie" Purkiss (27 July 1934 – 15 January 2008) was a rugby union player who represented Australia.

Purkiss, a flanker, was born in Grafton, New South Wales, and claimed a total of 2 international rugby caps for Australia. He made the Wallabies' 1957–58 Australia rugby union tour of Britain, Ireland and France.
