= 1975–76 Australia rugby union tour of Britain, Ireland and the United States =

- Manager: Ross Turnbull
- Coach: David Brockhoff
- Tour captain: John Hipwell
Summary
P	W	D	L
Total
25	17	1	7
Test match
5	2	0	3
Opponent
P	W	D	L
Scotland
1	0	0	1
Wales
1	0	0	1
England
1	0	0	1
Ireland
1	1	0	0
United States
1	1	0	0

The 1975–76 Australia rugby union tour of Britain and Ireland was a series of matches played by the Australia national rugby union team (nicknamed the Wallabies). The team was referred to as the "Sixth Wallabies", although they were actually only the fifth Australian touring team to undertake a full tour of Britain & Ireland; the "Second Wallabies" of 1939–40 had to return home without playing a game when the World War II broke out.

The Wallabies played twenty-six matches between October 1975 and January 1976, including one match in the United States. Australia won nineteen games, drew one and lost six. They were generally unsuccessful in the four international matches in Europe, losing the first three and winning only the final fixture against Ireland. In their other matches they lost to Cardiff, England's Midlands (East) representative team and the Barbarians in the traditional final match of the European leg of the tour.

== The squad's leadership ==
Australia's world-class halfback John Hipwell had first toured with the Wallabies in 1966–67 and had captained his state and country on several occasions since 1973. He was an automatic selection as captain for the 26 match tour. Hipwell would captain the team in two Tests (Scotland and Wales) and in nine mid-week matches. An injury he suffered in the North-Eastern Counties game resulted in serious damage to the cruciate ligaments in his leg, caused him to be replaced in the Wales Test and ended his playing involvement on tour after the game against the Combined Services.

Centre Geoff Shaw took over the captaincy from Hipwell and led the side in six mid-week matches as well as the England, Ireland and United States Tests. Tony Shaw took a leadership role in the forwards, playing in 19 matches and was the only back-rower to play in all Tests.

The tour manager was 33-year-old Newcastle solicitor Ross Turnbull, who had won a single Wallaby cap as a prop against Scotland on a short tour to the British Isles in 1968. The Rothmans Rugby Yearbook asserts that he managed the side "splendidly" and "did much to make his side one of the most popular ever to visit Britain".

The tour coach was 47-year-old David Brockhoff who as per Wallaby tour tradition, carried the official title of assistant manager. The flamboyant Brockhoff had been capped eight times as a Wallaby between 1949 and 1951. Rothmans Rugby Yearbook stated "[He] played a big part in the team's success. He was a dynamic, driving force, often against considerable difficulties".

== Tour itinerary ==
The tour followed a by-then well established pattern for touring teams to Europe from the Southern Hemisphere. Australia played test matches against all four Home Nations and a number of other matches against Welsh clubs and representative teams, Irish provinces, Scottish district teams and combinations of English county sides. The tour opened as was customary with a match against a university team, Oxford on this occasion, and by tradition took in a match just after Christmas against a Combined Services team selected from the Army, RAF and Royal Navy; on previous tours this had been played at Twickenham, but was now held at Aldershot.

The final fixture in Europe was another traditional match, the tourist game against the Barbarians, which had begun at the end of 1947–48 Wallaby tour as a fund-raising game. The tourists were guests a Sportsman's Luncheon at the Savoy Hotel in London where dignitaries included Sir Douglas Bader.

After leaving Europe the Wallabies played a match against the United States national rugby union team, for which the Australian players were awarded full international caps. This was the first match played by a United States national team since the 1924 Summer Olympic Games; the United States rugby union (now USA Rugby) had been founded in 1975.

== Matches ==
Scores and results list Australia's points tally first.

	Date	Opponent	Location	Result	Score
Match 1	29 October	Oxford University	Iffley Road, Oxford	Won	36–3
Match 2	1 November	Cardiff	Cardiff Arms Park, Cardiff	Lost	9–14
Match 3	4 November	Llanelli	Stradey Park, Llanelli	Drew	28–28
Match 4	8 November	London Counties	Twickenham, London	Won	26–11
Match 5	12 November	Midland Counties (East)	Welford Road, Leicester	Lost	8–11
Match 6	15 November	Ulster	Ravenhill, Belfast	Won	30–25
Match 7	19 November	Edinburgh	Myreside, Edinburgh	Won	10–9
Match 8	22 November	North-East Counties	County Ground, Gosforth	Won	22–21
Match 9	26 November	Gloucestershire-Somerset	Bristol	Won	15–6
Match 10	29 November	Swansea	St. Helen's, Swansea	Won	12–6
Match 11	1 December	South of Scotland	Netherdale, Galashiels	Won	10–6
Match 12	6 December	SCOTLAND	Murrayfield Stadium, Edinburgh	Lost	3–10
Match 13	10 December	Southern Counties	Aylesbury RFC, Weston Turville	Won	33–14
Match 14	13 December	Midland Counties (West)	Coundon Road, Coventry	Won	31–12
Match 15	16 December	Glamorgan	The Gnoll, Neath	Won	51–18
Match 16	20 December	WALES	National Stadium, Cardiff	Lost	3–28
Match 17	27 December	Cornwall-Devon	Exeter	Won	23–9
Match 18	30 December	Combined Services	Aldershot	Won	14–3
Match 19	3 January	ENGLAND	Twickenham, London	Lost	6–23
Match 20	7 January	Newport	Rodney Parade, Newport	Won	13–7
Match 21	10 January	North-West Counties	Blundellsands	Won	21–16
Match 22	14 January	Munster	Musgrave Park, Cork	Won	15–13
Match 23	17 January	IRELAND	Lansdowne Road, Dublin	Won	20–10
Match 24	21 January	Gwent	Pontypool Park, Pontypool	Won	26–15
Match 25	24 January	Barbarians	National Stadium, Cardiff, Cardiff	Lost	7–19
Match 26	31 January	USA	Glover Field, Anaheim	Won	24–12

== Test matches ==
=== Scotland ===
6 December 1975

Scotland	10–3	Australia
(4 – 1t) Dick (4 – 1t) Renwick (2 – 1c) Morgan		(3 – 1pg) McLean

Murrayfield Stadium, Edinburgh
Attendance: 50,000
Referee: Johnny Johnson (England)

Scotland opened the scoring against the run of play in the 26th minute with a try in the corner from Lewis Dick, set up by McGeechan and Hay. Morgan was unable to convert. Scotland's second try, just before half time, was scored by Jim Renwick after a 40-yard run when a pass from Hipwell to McLean went astray. Morgan converted this time to put Scotland 10–0 up at half time. Rothmans Yearbook commented "with luck [Australia] could have been 10 points up instead". Scotland dominated the territory in the second half but were unable to add to their score; McLean's 35-yard penalty goal for Australia was the only score of the half to make the result 10–3 to Scotland.

Scotland: Bruce Hay, Andy Irvine, Jim Renwick, Ian McGeechan, Lewis Dick, Colin Telfer, Dougie Morgan, Sandy Carmichael, Colin Fisher, Ian McLauchlan (c), Gordon Brown, Alastair McHarg, Wilson Lauder, David Leslie, George Mackie

Australia: Paul McLean, Paddy Batch, David L'Estrange, John Berne (rep John Weatherstone 57 mins), Laurie Monaghan, John Hipwell (c), Ron Graham, Peter Horton, John Meadows, Reg Smith, Garrick Fay, Tony Shaw, Greg Cornelsen, David Hillhouse.

=== Wales ===
20 December 1975

Wales	28–3	Australia
(12 – 3t) J. J. Williams (7 – 2c, 1pg) Fenwick (4 – 1t) Edwards (3 – 1dg) Bevan (2 – 1c) Martin		(3 – 1pg) McLean

National Stadium, Cardiff
Attendance: 50,000
Referee: Paddy d'Arcy (Ireland)

Wales dominated the line-outs and rucks to record what was at the time their biggest win and highest score against Australia. A try by Gareth Edwards from close range, converted by Fenwick, and a Fenwick penalty goal gave Wales a 9–3 half-time lead, Australia's score coming from a McLean penalty goal. The Australian captain Hipwell had to go off just before half-time with a recurrence of his knee ligament injury, a loss which Rothmans Yearbook suggested might have "affected the margin but not the result". In the second half J.J. Williams scored a hat-trick of tries with Fenwick and Martin adding a conversion each. Bevan scored a dropped goal and Wales finished 28–3 winners. Rothmans concluded that "Australia fought hard to the end, but on the day met a team which was too good for them at all points". Phil Bennett was selected at fly-half for Wales but withdrew after suffering an injury playing for Llanelli and was replaced by John Bevan.

Wales: J. P. R. Williams, J. J. Williams, Ray Gravell, Steve Fenwick, Clive Rees, John Bevan, Gareth Edwards, Graham Price, Bobby Windsor, Charlie Faulkner, Geoff Wheel, Allan Martin, Terry Cobner, Trefor Evans, Mervyn Davies (c).

Australia: Paul McLean, Paddy Batch, David L'Estrange, Geoff Shaw, Laurie Monaghan, Hindmarsh, John Hipwell (c) (rep Rod Hauser 39 mins), Ron Graham, Peter Horton, John Meadows, Reg Smith, Garrick Fay, Tony Shaw, John Lambie (rep Gary Pearse 14 mins), Greg Cornelsen.

=== England ===
3 January 1976

England	23–6	Australia
(11 – 1c, 3pg) Hignell (4 – 1t) Corless (4 – 1t) Lampkowski (4 – 1t) Duckham		(6 – 2pg) McLean

Twickenham Stadium, London
Attendance: 47,000
Referee: Meirion Joseph (Wales)

Australia had won both international matches on the 1975 England rugby union tour of Australia but were beaten at Twickenham and failed to score a try for the third successive international on tour. Hipwell, Price and Fay were all unavailable due to injury. Hignell's two penalty goals for England to one by McLean made the half-time score 6–3. This remained unchanged until the 67th minute when England debutant Corless scored a try after chasing his own kick to make it 10–3. Five minutes later another player making his first appearance, Lampkowski, scored a try after a scrum near the Australian line and Duckham added a third try which was converted by Hignell, who also scored a penalty goal in the second half. The only Australia score in the second half was another McLean penalty goal. England's 23 points was at the time their highest score against Australia, and the 17-point winning margin equalled their record margin against the Wallabies.

Australia: Paul McLean, Paddy Batch, Bill McKid, Geoff Shaw (c), Laurie Monaghan, John Weatherstone, Rod Hauser, Stuart Macdougall, Peter Horton, Steve Finnane, Reg Smith, David Hillhouse, Tony Shaw, Greg Cornelsen, Mark Loane.

England: Alastair Hignell, Peter Squires, Andy Maxwell, Barrie Corless, David Duckham, Martin Cooper, Mike Lampkowski, Fran Cotton, Peter Wheeler, Mike Burton, Bill Beaumont, Bob Wilkinson, Mark Keyworth, Tony Neary (c), Andy Ripley

=== Ireland ===
17 January 1976

Ireland	10–20	Australia
(6 – 2pg) Robbie (4 – 1t) McMaster		(8 – 1c, 2pg) McLean (4 – 1t) Ryan (4 – 1t) A. Shaw (4 – 1t) Weatherstone

Lansdowne Road, Dublin
Attendance: 52,000
Referee: Brian Anderson (Scotland)

Australia registered their first international victory of the tour and scored three tries in beating Ireland. The first half ended with Ireland in a narrow 7–6 lead from McMaster's try and Robbie's penalty goal to two penalty goals from McLean; new Irish cap Ollie Campbell missed three penalties which might have given Ireland a more comfortable lead. In the second half the Australian pack took control and the Wallabies scored three tries through Ryan, Tony Shaw and Weatherstone, one of which was converted by McLean. Rothmans Yearbook singled out Loane who "stood out in the Wallaby pack" and Hauser who "had an excellent game at scrum-half".

Australia: Paul McLean, John Ryan, David L'Estrange, Geoff Shaw (c), Laurie Monaghan, John Weatherstone, Rod Hauser, Ron Graham, Chris Carberry, John Meadows, Reg Smith, Garrick Fay, Tony Shaw, Gary Pearse, Mark Loane.

Ireland: Tony Ensor, Tom Grace, J.A. McIlrath, Mike Gibson (c), Wallace McMaster, Ollie Campbell, John Robbie, F. McLoughlin, John Cantrell, Pa Agnew, Moss Keane, M. Molloy, Stewart McKinney, Fergus Slattery, Willie Duggan

=== United States ===
31 January 1976

United States	12–24	Australia
(12 – 4pg) Oxman		(12 – 4pg) Hindmarsh (4 – 1t) Ryan (4 – 1t) Pearse (4 – 1t) Price

Glover Field, Anaheim
Attendance: 6,000
Referee: A. C. Pontin (United States)

In the first game ever played by a United States national rugby union team in their own country, Australia won 24–12 but needed two late tries to make the game safe. In a game played in 83-degree heat, Australia took a 13–6 lead at half-time through Ray Price's try and three penalty goals from Jim Hindmarsh, to Oxman's two penalty goals for the home team. Hindmarsh stretched the lead to 16–6 with another penalty goal before two from Oxman brought the United States back within four points with eight minutes left. Tries from Ryan and Pearse ultimately gave the Wallabies a comfortable win although Rothmans Yearbook stated that "the losers fought back right to the end" and "were by no means outclassed".

Australia: Hindmarsh, John Ryan, David L'Estrange, Geoff Shaw (c), Laurie Monaghan, Ken Wright, Rod Hauser, Ron Graham, Chris Carberry, John Meadows, Reg Smith, Garrick Fay, Ray Price, Gary Pearse, Tony Shaw.

United States: K. Oxman, D. Chipman, D. Stephenson, G. Schneeweis, S. Auerbach, Robbie Bordley (c), M. Swiderski, M. Ording, Fred Khasigian, E. Swanson, C. Sweeney, G. Brackett, S. Nieubauer, T. Klein, T. Selfridge.

== Other matches ==
=== Oxford University ===
29 October 1975	Oxford University	3–36	Australia	Iffley Road, Oxford
	Pen: Quinnen		Try: Hipwell (2), Ryan (2) Loane, Batch; Con: McLean (3); Pen: McLean (2)	Attendance: 8,000; Referee: Johnny Johnson

=== Cardiff ===
1 November 1975	Cardiff	14–9	Australia	Cardiff Arms Park, Cardiff
	Try: P. L. Jones, Davies; Pen: Davies (2)		Pen: McLean (3)	Attendance: 30,000; Referee: John West

=== Llanelli ===
4 November 1975	Llanelli	28–28	Australia	Stradey Park, Llanelli
	Try: Hill, J. J. Williams; Con: Bennett; Pen: Bennett (5); Drop: Bennett		Try: Monaghan (2); Con: McLean; Pen: McLean (6)	Attendance: 22,000; Referee: Alan Welsby

=== London Counties ===
8 November 1975	London Counties	11–26	Australia	Twickenham, London
	Try: Martin, Wyatt; Pen: Bennett		Try: Hauser, Batch, Hindmarsh; Con: McLean; Pen: McLean (4)	Attendance: 15,000; Referee: M. Joseph

=== Midland Counties (East) ===
12 November 1975	Midland Counties (East)	11–8	Australia	Welford Road, Leicester
	Try: Parker (2); Pen: Hare		Try: Hipwell, Monaghan	Attendance: 10,000; Referee: K. Clark

=== Ulster ===
15 November 1975	Ulster	25–30	Australia	Ravenhill, Belfast
	Try: MacMaster, Agnew, Barker, Oaks; Con: McCombe (3); Pen: McCombe		Try: Batch (3), Berne; Con: Fitzgerald (4); Pen: Batch (2)	Attendance: 9,000; Referee: Denzil Lloyd

=== Edinburgh ===
19 November 1975	Edinburgh	9–10	Australia	Myreside, Edinburgh
	Try: Irvine; Con: Irvine; Pen: Irvine		Try: Ryan (2); Con: McLean	Attendance: 7,000; Referee: Roger Quittenton

=== North East Counties ===
22 November 1975	North-East Counties	21–22	Australia	Northumberland County Ground, Gosforth
	Try: Squires, McGeechan; Con: Young, Old; Pen: Old (3)		Try: Shaw (2), Hipwell; Con: McLean (2); Pen: McLean (2)	Attendance: 8,000; Referee: T. F. Grierson

=== Gloucestershire-Somerset ===
26 November 1975	Gloucestershire-Somerset	6–15	Australia	Memorial Ground, Bristol
	Pen: Butler (2)		Try: Pearse, Cornelsen, Ryan; Pen: Batch	Attendance: 15,000; Referee: M. S. Lewis

=== Swansea ===
29 November 1975	Swansea	6–12	Australia	St Helen's, Swansea
	Pen: Rees (2)		Try: Tony Shaw; Con: McLean; Pen: McLean (2)	Attendance: 20,000; Referee: Alan Hosie

=== Southern Counties ===
10 December 1975	Southern Counties	14–33	Australia	Aylesbury RFC, Weston Turville
	Try: Ray, Maxwell; Pen: Richards (2)		Try: McKid, Hindmarsh, McLean, Batch, Weatherstone, Pearse; Con: McLean (3); Pen: McLean	Attendance: 5,000; Referee: Norman Sanson

=== Midland Counties (West) ===
13 December 1975	Midland Counties (West)	12–31	Australia	Coundon Road, Coventry
	Try: Preece; Con: Doble; Pen: Doble (2)		Try: Batch (3), Cornelsen McLean; Con: McLean (4); Pen: McLean	Attendance: 12,000; Referee: J. C. Kelleher

=== Glamorgan ===
16 December 1975	Glamorgan	18–51	Australia	The Gnoll, Neath
	Pen: Lewis (4)		Try: Wright (3), Ryan (3), Hindmarsh, Hillhouse; Con: Hindmarsh (5); Pen: Hindmarsh (3)	Attendance: 12,000; Referee: Peter Lillington

=== Cornwall-Devon ===
27 December 1975	Cornwall-Devon	9–23	Australia	County Ground Stadium, Exeter
	Pen: Winnan (3)		Try: Batch (2), Loane, Cornelsen; Con: McLean (2); Pen: McLean	Attendance: 8,000; Referee: Corris Thomas

=== Combined Services ===
30 December 1975	Combined Services	3–14	Australia	Aldershot Military Stadium, Aldershot
	Pen: Piercy		Try: Batch, Ryan; Pen: Weatherstone; Drop: Weatherstone	Attendance: 5,000; Referee: Mike Titcomb

=== Newport ===
7 January 1976	Newport	7–13	Australia	Rodney Parade, Newport
	Try: Burcher; Pen: Fuller		Try: Pearse; Pen: Hindmarsh (3)	Attendance: 15,000; Referee: Rev R. N. Newell

=== North-West Counties ===
10 January 1976	North-West Counties	16–21	Australia	Blundellsands
	Try: Slemen; Pen: Toone (4)		Try: Loane, Hillhouse; Con: McLean (2); Pen: McLean (3)	Attendance: 7,000; Referee: Ken Rowlands

=== Munster ===
14 January 1976	Munster	13–15	Australia	Musgrave Park, Cork
	Try: Deering; Pen: Ward (2); Drop: Ward		Try: Weatherstone; Con: McLean; Pen: McLean (3)	Attendance: 12,000; Referee: P. E. Hughes

=== Gwent ===
21 January 1976	Gwent	15–26	Australia	Pontypool Park, Pontypool
	Pen: Thomas (3), Browning; Drop: James		Try: Monaghan, Hauser, Loane; Con: Hindmarsh; Pen: Hindmarsh (4)	Attendance: 12,000; Referee: D. Jones

=== Barbarians ===
24 January 1976	Barbarians	19–7	Australia	National Stadium, Cardiff
	Try: Bennett, Wheeler, Williams; Con: Bennett (2); Pen: Bennett		Try: Ryan; Pen: Hindmarsh	Attendance: 50,000; Referee: G. Domercq (France)

Barbarians: Andy Irvine, Gerald Davies, Ray Gravell, Mike Gibson, J. J. Williams, Phil Bennett, Gareth Edwards, Mike Knill, Peter Wheeler, Sandy Carmichael, Allan Martin, Gordon Brown, Trefor Evans, Mervyn Davies (c), Fergus Slattery

== Touring party ==
- Tour manager: Ross Turnbull
- Coach: David Brockhoff
- Captain: John Hipwell

=== Squad ===
Test and tour appearances include appearances as a replacement, which are shown in brackets e.g. (1R)

Name	Tests	Club	Career Caps	Tour Apps	Position	Pts
Mike Fitzgerald	0		0	2	Full back	8
Geoff Shaw (c)	4	University of Queensland	27	14	Three-quarter	0
John Ryan	2		6	15	Three-quarter	52
Laurie Monaghan	5	West Harbour RFC	17	21	Three-quarter	12
Paddy Batch	3	University of Queensland	14	17	Three-quarter	57
John Weatherstone	1(1R)		7	17(2R)	Three-quarter	18
Bill McKid	1	Country NSW – Barraba	6	12(2R)	Three-quarter	4
David L'Estrange	4	Brothers	16	13(1R)	Three-quarter	0
John Berne	1	Randwick DRUFC	1	8	Three-quarter	4
Ken Wright	1	Randwick DRUFC	9	9	Half	16
Jim Hindmarsh	3		9	15	Half	75
Paul McLean	4	Brisbane Brothers	30	18	Half	154
John Hipwell(c)	2	Newcastle Waratahs	36	11	Half	16
Rod Hauser	4(1R)	Brisbane Norths	15	16(1R)	Half	8
Gary Grey	0		5	0	Half	0
Ray Price	1	Parramatta Two Blues	8	7	Forward	0
Gary Pearse	3(1R)	Port Hacking Rugby Club	9	14(2R)	Forward	16
Tony Shaw	5	Brisbane Brothers	36	19	Forward	12
Mark Loane	2	University of Queensland	28	13	Forward	16
John Meadows	4	Wests Brisbane	22	15	Forward	0
John Lambie	1	Port Hacking Rugby Club	4	9	Forward	0
Greg Cornelsen	3	Brisbane Norths	25	14	Forward	16
Reg Smith	5		22	19	Forward	0
Chris Carberry	2	GPS Brisbane	13	14	Forward	0
Brian Mansfield	0		1	2	Forward	0
David Hillhouse	0		16	16(2R)	Forward	8
Glenn Eisenhauer	0		0	6	Forward	0
Garrick Fay	4	Northern Suburbs	24	15	Forward	0
Stuart Macdougall	1	St. George	8	8	Forward	0
Steve Finnane	1		6	11	Forward	0
Ron Graham	4		18	18	Forward	0
Peter Horton	3		19	13(1R)	Forward	0

== Sources ==
- Jenkins, Vivian, ed. (1976). Rothmans Rugby Yearbook 1976–77. Queen Anne Press. ISBN 0362002819.
- Thomas, J. B. G. (1976). Wallabies' Walkabout. London: Pelham Books. ISBN 0720708990.
- Collection (1995) Gordon Bray presents The Spirit of Rugby, HarperCollins Publishers Sydney
- Howell, Max (2005). Born to Lead - Wallaby Test Captains. Auckland: Celebrity Books.
