= 1976 Australia rugby union tour of Europe =

- Manager: John Bain
- Tour captain: Geoff Shaw
Summary
P	W	D	L
Total
10	4	0	6
Test match
3	1	0	2
Opponent
P	W	D	L
France
2	0	0	2
Italy
1	1	0	0

The 1976 Australia rugby union tour of Europe was a series of ten matches played by the Australia national rugby union team (the Wallabies) in France and Italy in October and November 1976. The Wallabies won four and lost six of their matches; they lost both of their international matches against France in Bordeaux and Paris but won the international against Italy.

Australia did not award full international caps for the match against Italy while Italy did. The match was played at Arena Civica in Milan and was narrowly won by the Australians by one point, 16-15.

== Matches ==
Scores and results list Australia's points tally first.

Opposing Team	For	Against	Date	Venue
Selection Française	17	15	6 October	Toulon
Selection Française	14	15	10 October	Narbonne
Selection Française	6	10	13 October	Clermont-Ferrand
Selection Française	15	9	17 October	Périgueux
Selection Française	7	16	20 October	Tarbes
FRANCE	15	18	24 October	Parc Lescure, Bordeaux
Selection Française	12	6	26 October	La Rochelle
FRANCE	6	34	30 October	Parc des Princes, Paris
Selection Française	7	25	1 November	Bourg-en-Bresse
Italy	16	15	4 November	Arena Civica, Milan

== Touring party ==
- Manager - John Bain
- Coach - Bob Templeton
- Captain - Geoff Shaw

=== Backs ===
- Paddy Batch
- Philip Crowe
- Gary Grey
- Rod Hauser
- Jim Hindmarsh
- Bill McKid
- Peter McLean
- Laurie Monaghan
- John Ryan
- Greg Shambrook
- Geoff Shaw
- Ken Wright

=== Forwards ===
- Bruce Battishall
- Keith Besomo
- Chris Carberry
- Greg Cornelsen
- David Dunworth
- Glenn Eisenhauer
- Steve Finnane
- Tony Gelling
- Ron Graham
- David Hillhouse
- Peter Horton
- Mark Loane
- John Meadows
- Gary Pearse
- Tony Shaw
- Reg Smith
