= 1972 Australia rugby union tour of New Zealand and Fiji =

- Manager: Joe French
- Tour captain: Greg Davis
Summary
P	W	D	L
Total
14	6	1	7
Test match
4	1	0	3
Opponent
P	W	D	L
New Zealand
3	0	0	3
Fiji
1	1	0	0

The 1972 Australia rugby union tour of New Zealand and Fiji was a series of thirteen rugby union matches, including three tests, played by the Wallabies in New Zealand, plus a one-off test match played by the Wallabies against the Fijians in Fiji. The tour took place in August and September 1972.

The test series in New Zealand was won by the All Blacks with three wins from three matches. The test match in Fiji was won by the Wallabies.

== Results ==
Scores and results list Australia's points tally first.

Opposing Team	For	Against	Date	Venue	Status
Otago	0	26	5 Aug 1972	Carisbrook, Dunedin	Tour match
West Coast-Buller	10	15	9 Aug 1972	Victoria Square, Westport	Tour match
Taranaki	20	15	12 Aug 1972	Rugby Park, New Plymouth	Tour match
Bay of Plenty	6	6	15 Aug 1972	Tauranga Domain, Tauranga	Tour match
New Zealand	6	29	19 Aug 1972	Athletic Park, Wellington	Test match
King Country	13	6	23 Aug 1972	Taumarunui Domain, Taumarunui	Tour match
Hawke's Bay	14	15	26 Aug 1972	McLean Park, Napier	Tour match
Nelson Bays	26	7	29 Sep 1972	Trafalgar Park, Nelson	Tour match
New Zealand	17	30	2 Sep 1972	Lancaster Park, Christchurch	Test match
North Otago	37	12	5 Sep 1972	Centennial Park, Oamaru	Tour match
Waikato	24	26	9 Sep 1972	Rugby Park, Hamilton	Tour match
Poverty Bay / East Coast	22	19	12 Sep 1972	Rugby Park, Gisborne	Tour match
New Zealand	3	38	16 Sep 1972	Eden Park, Auckland	Test match
Fiji	21	19	19 Sep 1972	National Stadium, Suva	Test match

== Squad leadership ==
The Wallaby squad was captained by Greg Davis described by Howell as "a leader of men who believed a leader should lead....a single minded flanker who gave no quarter and asked for none". Davis was making his seventh and final overseas tour with the Wallabies, his third as captain. Howell writes that for Davis at 33 years and the end of a magnificent career, the seven loss & five win result of the tour was "a disaster and occasioned Davis' retirement". An injury picked up in New Zealand prevented Davis from leading the side in the Test match in Fiji on the way home. Peter Sullivan led the Wallabies to a narrow 21-19 victory against Fiji. He had already captained Australia in two mid-week games during the New Zealand leg. The third Test in New Zealand, a 38-3 romp by the All Blacks was Greg Davis' last match.

Joe French was the tour manager. Bob Templeton was the team's coach who carried the traditional touring title of Assistant Manager.

== Touring party ==
- Manager - Joe French
- Assistant manager - Bob Templeton
- Captain - Greg Davis

=== Backs ===
- Dave Burnet
- John Cole
- John Cornes
- Russell Fairfax
- Gary Grey
- David L'Estrange
- Arthur McGill
- Jeff McLean
- David Rathie
- Geoff Richardson
- Peter Rowles
- John Taylor

=== Forwards ===
- Bruce Brown
- Dick Cocks
- Greg Davis
- Garrick Fay
- Mick Freney
- Tony Gelling
- Jake Howard
- Roy Prosser
- Reg Smith
- Barry Stumbles
- Peter Sullivan
- Robert Thompson
- Robert Wood
