= 1973 Australia rugby union tour of Europe =

National team tour

Summary
P	W	D	L
Total
9	3	1	5
Test match
2	0	0	2
Opponent
P	W	D	L
Wales
1	0	0	1
England
1	0	0	1
Italy
1	1	0	0

The 1973 Australia rugby union tour of Europe was a series of nine matches played by the Australia national rugby union team (the Wallabies) in England and Wales in October and November 1973. The Wallabies won only of three of their matches, lost five and drew the other one; they lost both of their international matches, against Wales and England. The final match with Italy, is not considered as a capped Test match by Australian Rugby Union.

== Matches ==
Scores and results list Australia's points tally first.

Opposing Team	For	Against	Date	Venue
(England) Metropolitan Counties	17	15	24 October	Bournemouth
(England) South and South-West Counties	14	15	27 October	Recreation Ground, Bath
East Wales	11	19	31 October	Rodney Parade, Newport
(Wales) Swansea	9	9	3 November	St. Helen's, Swansea
West Wales	18	13	6 November	Talbot Athletic Ground, Port Talbot
(Wales) WALES	0	24	10 November	Cardiff Arms Park, Cardiff
(England) Northern Counties	13	16	13 November	Gosforth
(England) ENGLAND	3	20	17 November	Twickenham London
Italy	59	21	21 November	Stadio Fattori L'Aquila

== Touring party ==
- Manager: John Freedman
- Assistant manager: Bob Templeton
- Captain: Peter Sullivan

=== Backs ===
- Dave Burnet
- David L'Estrange
- Russell Fairfax
- Rod Hauser
- John Hipwell
- Arthur McGill
- Laurie Monaghan
- Geoff Richardson
- Owen Stephens
- Jeff McLean
- Peter Rowles
- Geoff Shaw

=== Forwards ===
- Bruce Battishall
- Chris Carberry
- Dick Cocks
- Garrick Fay
- Mick Freney
- Ron Graham
- Stuart Gregory
- Jake Howard
- Stuart Macdougall
- Ken McCurrach
- Tony Shaw
- Reg Smith
- Peter Sullivan
