= 1978 Australia rugby union tour of New Zealand =

- Manager: Ross Turnbull
- Tour captain: Tony Shaw
Summary
| P | W | D | L |
Total
| 12 | 6 | 0 | 6 |
Test match
| 3 | 1 | 0 | 2 |
Opponent
| P | W | D | L |
New Zealand
| 3 | 1 | 0 | 2 |

== Results ==
Scores and results list Australia's points tally first.

| Opposing Team | For | Against | Date | Venue | Status |
|---|---|---|---|---|---|
| Nelson Bays | 19 | 6 | 29 July 1978 | Trafalgar Park, Nelson | Tour match |
| Southland | 7 | 10 | 2 August 1978 | Rugby Park, Invercargill | Tour match |
| Otago | 8 | 10 | 5 August 1978 | Carisbrook, Dunedin | Tour match |
| Hawke's Bay | 16 | 6 | 9 August 1978 | McLean Park, Napier | Tour match |
| Manawatu | 10 | 20 | 12 August 1978 | Showgrounds, Palmerston North | Tour match |
| Counties | 17 | 8 | 15 August 1978 | Pukekohe Stadium, Pukekohe | Tour match |
| New Zealand | 12 | 13 | 19 August 1978 | Athletic Park, Wellington | Test match |
| Mid Canterbury | 19 | 12 | 22 August 1978 | Showgrounds, Ashburton | Tour match |
| New Zealand | 6 | 22 | 26 August 1978 | Lancaster Park, Christchurch | Test match |
| Wanganui | 8 | 3 | 30 August 1978 | Spriggins Park, Wanganui | Tour match |
| North Auckland | 11 | 16 | 5 September 1978 | Okara Park, Whangārei | Tour match |
| New Zealand | 30 | 16 | 9 September 1978 | Eden Park, Auckland | Test match |

== Touring party ==
- Manager - Ross Turnbull
- Assistant manager - Daryl Haberecht
- Captain - Tony Shaw

=== Backs ===
- Paddy Batch
- Peter Carson
- Roger Gould
- Rod Hauser
- John Hipwell
- Martin Knight
- Paul McLean
- Bill McKid
- Laurie Monaghan
- Brendan Moon
- Geoff Richards
- Andrew Slack
- Steve Streeter
- Ken Wright

=== Forwards ===
- Tom Barker
- Keith Besomo
- Greg Cornelsen
- Garrick Fay
- Chris Handy
- Peter Horton
- Mark Loane
- Peter McLean
- John Meadows
- Rob Onus
- Stan Pilecki
- Bill Ross
- Gary Pearse
- Tony Shaw

== Sources ==
- John Brooks (1979). Jenkins, Vivian (ed.). Rothmans Rugby Yearbook 1979–80. London: Rothmans Publications Ltd. pp. 40–46. ISBN 0354090879.
