= Southern Districts Rugby Club =

Rugby union club, based in Southern Sydney, New South Wales, Australia

Australia
- Union: New South Wales Rugby Union
- Founded: 1989; 37 years ago
- Location: Sydney, New South Wales, Australia
- Region: New South Wales
- Ground(s): Forshaw Park, Sylvania Waters (Capacity: 5000)
- President: Matt Bar
- Coach: (HC) Scott Fava
- League: Shute Shield
Team kit

Official website
- www.southerndistricts.com.au

Southern Districts Rugby Club is a rugby union club based in southern Sydney. The club currently competes in the New South Wales Rugby Union competition the Shute Shield. The club was formed by the amalgamation of the St George and Port Hacking clubs.

== History ==
Formed in 1989 by the amalgamation of St George and Port Hacking rugby clubs, with headquarters at Forshaw Park, Sylvania Waters, south of Sydney. The new club played in red, sky blue, white and black jumpers and fielded 6 grade teams, 3 colts' sides, and an under-19XV. Accommodation is limited at Forshaw Park to 2000 but the club has enjoyed splendid support since the amalgamation.

St George, founded in 1906, brought to the mix a long record of figuring prominently in 1st grade finals, but not in living memory and with only one premiership win – in 1957, when St George beat Gordon 21–3 in the Grand Final. St George showed promise of great success when it first came into the Sydney competition but was one of the clubs which suffered heavily from the decision to postpone all football for the duration of World War I. The club was forced to disband in 1915 and did not function again until 1928 when the famous Test forward Harold Judd was instrumental in reforming it. Judd coached St George 1st Grade after the 13-year break from competition and his nephew Bruce, a Waratah, helped him revive the club.

Since winger Dan Carroll became St George's first international when he won selection in the first Wallabies for the tour of England, Wales and North America in 1908–09, 28 players from the club have won international honours, including Mick Clifford, dual international (for Australia and the All Blacks), Owen Stephens, Arthur Buchan, Alan Cameron who played 266 games for the club Eddie Stapleton 236, Terry Casey 105, Ron Graham 167 and Bruce Battishall. St George was relegated to 2nd division in 1979, but won promotion back to 1st division after only one season by beating Sydney University.

St George played in single-colour jumpers to save costs, playing in purple in 1928 and in orange during World War II, but when Bill Cerutti became the club coach he recommended that it adopt the red-and-white-striped jumper of the Transvaal Club. This remained the club's uniform until the move to Sylvania. At this time Randwick was playing in red-and-white jumpers, but following requests from St George they changed their colours. The myrtle green that Randwick now play in, was adopted from the destination boards of the trams that ran to Coogee.

Port Hacking began when a group of lifesavers from Cronulla, North Cronulla and Wanda clubs tried to enter a junior league competition but were rejected because they could only muster one team. They entered the team instead, in the 1957 Whiddon Cup in the competition with Lance Turbet president, Norm Rees secretary and Allan Carruthers treasurer of what was known as the North Cronulla SLSC Rugby Club. They won the Whiddon Cup at their first attempt and the next season won the Burke Cup.

After success in 2 nd division competitions over the preceding 9 seasons (the only club to win 4 grand finals), Port Hacking joined a Sydney competition expanded to 12 teams with Warringah in 1971 and won five matches in its first season. Since then Port Hacking's teething problems were overcome through the efforts of an emerging bunch of players, such as Greg Halpin and Michael Nethery, backed by the experience of Graeme MacDougall, Gary Pearse, John Lambie and John Coolican. The location of the club on the southern outskirts of Sydney gave rugby an important foothold in a fast-developing area.

There were grumbles from members of both clubs when they were amalgamated but these have been forgotten as the new club moved to improve facilities at Forshaw Park.

In 2011, the Southern Districts Second Grade team won the grand final of the Colin Caird Shield, defeating Eastwood 24 points to 16. In 2012, The Southern Districts First Grade team lost by one point in the Shute Shield Grand Final to Sydney University 15 points to 14. In 2014, The Southern Districts First Grade team were beaten by Eastwood 33 to 13 at Concord Oval. The Southern Districts First Grade side have also finished runners-up in the minor premiership in 2016 and 2017.

The club currently fields four open Grade teams, three Colts teams and a women's 7's team which compete fiercely in all competitions.

== Wallaby Representatives ==
National Team	Y	N	C
Australia	1903–05	Harold Judd*	5
Australia	1908–12	Daniel Carroll*	2
Australia	1925	Harry Bryant*	3
Australia	1925–31	Bruce Judd*	11
Australia	1928–37	Bill Cerutti*	21
Australia	1928	Myer Rosenblum*	4
Australia	1938	Mick Clifford*	1
Australia	1946	Burnett Schulte*	1
Australia	1946	Jim Stone*	2
Australia	1951–58	Alan Cameron*	20
Australia	1951–58	Eddie Stapleton*	16
Australia	1952–54	Herb Barker*	7
Australia	1957–59	Alan Morton*	11
Australia	1958	Tony Fox*	1
Australia	1958–67	Jim Lenehan*	27
Australia	1961	Graeme Macdougall*	2
Australia	1961	Ted Magrath*	3
Australia	1963–64	Terry Casey*	6
Australia	1971–76	Stuart Macdougall* **	8
Australia	1972	Barry Stumbles*	4
Australia	1973–76	Ron Graham*	18
Australia	1973–74	Owen Stephens*	5
Australia	1974	Bruce Battishall*	1
Australia	1974–75	John Lambie**	4
Australia	1975–78	Gary Pearse**	9
Australia	1982	Peter Lucas*	3
Australia	1982–83	John Coolican**	4
Australia	1983	Mark Harding**	1
Australia	1988	Peter Kay	1
Australia	1993–96	Scott Bowen	9
Australia	2002–06	Mat Rogers	45
Australia	2004	Nic Henderson	3
Australia	2006	Guy Shepherdson	18
Australia	2012 –	Nick Cummins	15

JED HOLLOWAY

Legend : Y : Year, N : Name, C : Caps, * : St George, ** : Port Hacking.

== Honours ==
- Shute Shield: 1957 (as St George)
