= 1976 Five Nations Championship squads =

Rugby union competition squads

These are the 1976 Five Nations Championship squads:

== England ==
Head coach: Peter Colston

1. Garry Adey
2. Bill Beaumont
3. Neil Bennett
4. Mike Burton
5. Peter Butler
6. David Cooke
7. Martin Cooper
8. Barrie Corless
9. Fran Cotton
10. David Duckham
11. Alastair Hignell
12. Mark Keyworth
13. Mike Lampkowski
14. Andy Maxwell
15. Tony Neary (c.)
16. Alan Old
17. Ken Plummer
18. Peter Preece
19. Andy Ripley
20. Mike Slemen
21. Steve Smith
22. Peter Squires
23. Peter Wheeler
24. Bob Wilkinson
25. Christopher Williams
26. Derek Wyatt

== France ==
Head coach: Jean Desclaux

1. Jean-Michel Aguirre
2. Jean-Luc Averous
3. Jean-Pierre Bastiat
4. René Bergès-Cau
5. Roland Bertranne
6. Gérard Cholley
7. Michel Droitecourt
8. André Dubertrand
9. Jacques Fouroux (c.)
10. Jean-François Gourdon
11. Francis Haget
12. Jean-François Imbernon
13. Alain Paco
14. Michel Palmie
15. Robert Paparemborde
16. Joël Pécune
17. Jean-Pierre Rives
18. Jean-Pierre Romeu
19. François Sangalli
20. Jean-Claude Skrela

== Ireland ==
Head coach: Roly Meates

1. Stephen Blake-Knox
2. Joseph Brady
3. Donal Canniffe
4. John Cantrell
5. Shay Deering
6. Willie Duggan
7. Tony Ensor
8. Brendan Foley
9. Mike Gibson (c.)
10. Tom Grace
11. Ronnie Hakin
12. Moss Keane
13. Patrick Lavery
14. Barry McGann
15. Ian McIlrath
16. Christopher McKibbin
17. Stewart McKinney
18. Wallace McMaster
19. Lawrence Moloney
20. Philo O'Callaghan
21. Phil Orr
22. John Robbie
23. Harold Steele

== Scotland ==
Head coach: Bill Dickinson

1. Mike Biggar
2. Gordon Brown
3. Sandy Carmichael
4. Alastair Cranston
5. Lewis Dick
6. Colin Fisher
7. Bruce Hay
8. Andy Irvine
9. Wilson Lauder
10. Alan Lawson
11. David Leslie
12. George Mackie
13. Duncan Madsen
14. Ian McGeechan
15. Alastair McHarg
16. Ian McLauchlan (c.)
17. Doug Morgan
18. Jim Renwick
19. David Shedden
20. Billy Steele
21. Colin Telfer
22. Alan Tomes
23. Ron Wilson

== Wales ==
Head coach: John Dawes

1. Phil Bennett
2. Terry Cobner
3. Tommy David
4. Gerald Davies
5. Mervyn Davies (c.)
6. Gareth Edwards
7. Trefor Evans
8. Charlie Faulkner
9. Steve Fenwick
10. Ray Gravell
11. Mike Knill
12. Allan Martin
13. Graham Price
14. Geoff Wheel
15. J. J. Williams
16. J. P. R. Williams
17. Bobby Windsor
