= 1979 Australia rugby union tour of Argentina =

- Date: Oct–Nov 1979
- Coach: Robert Templeton
- Tour captain: Mark Loane
Summary
P	W	D	L
Total
7	6	0	1
Test match
2	1	0	1
Opponent
P	W	D	L
Argentina
2	1	0	1

The 1979 Australia rugby union tour of Argentina was a series of matches played between October and November 1979 in Argentina by Australia. The Wallabies won six matches of seven and drew the two game test series against Los Pumas, led by Hugo Porta.

It was the first tour of an Australian side in Argentina. The Australian squad captain was the Queenslander Mark Loane.

With this visit of Australia, a new rugby relationship begins with a country that has an excellent level of play, similar to New Zealand, which means multiplying the possibilities of assimilation and improvement of our sport. It is also worth pointing out the correction and discipline observed by the Australian delegation during the course of their visit.

— The Argentine Rugby Union praising the first visit of an Australian side

== Players ==
Player	Match Played	Score				Total points
Player	Match Played	tries	conv.	pen.	drop	Total points
Tony Melrose	5	1	4	3	2	27
Michael O'Connor	6	4	1	2		24
Phil Crowe	4	6				24
Paul McLean	4		5	4		22
Brendan Moon	5	5				20
Roger Gould	2	1	6			16
Tony Shaw	6	3				12
Paddy Batch	4	3				12
Phillip Cox	4	2				8
Mark Ella	3	1			1	7
Mark Loane	6	1				4
Peter McLean	6	1				4
Andrew Slack	6					0
Stan Pilecki	5					0
Greg Cornelsen	4					0
Chris Handy	4					0
Mick Mathers	4					0
Bill Ross	4					0
Peter Carson	3					0
John Coolican	3					0
Tony D'Arcy	3					0
Duncan Hall	3					0
Peter Horton	3					0
Martin Knight	3					0
Andy Stewart	5					0

== Match details ==
13 October 1979

San Isidro Club	12–17	Australia
Try: penalty try Con: Loffreda; Pen: Loffreda; Drop: F.Sainz Trápaga;		Try: O'Connor, Moon, Crowe; Con: Paul McLean; Pen: Paul McLean

Ferro C. Oeste, Buenos Aires
Referee: Ángel Garrido (Argentina)

Team details

San Isidro Club: Fernando Argerich; Carlos Ramallo, Fernando Sainz Trápaga, Marcelo Loffreda, Mario Walther (capt.); Rafael Madero, Alfredo.Soares Gache; Ricardo de Vedia, Tomas Petersen, Roberto Lucke; Bernardo Miguens, Miguel Glastra; Fernando Insúa, Javier Pérez Cobo, Carlos Sainz Trápaga.
Australia: Paul McLean; B.Moon, Andrew Slack, M.O'Connor, P.Crowe; A.Melrose P, Carson; M.Loane (capt.); G.Cornelsen, T.Shaw; Peter Mc Lean, M.Mathers; S.Pilecki, P, Horton, C.Handy.

16 October 1979

Seleccionado del Interior (Note: Combined team formed by players outside Buenos Aires)	12–47	Australia
Try: Basile; Con: Virgolini; Pen: Virgolini; Drop: Rodriguez		Try: Crowe 2, Ella; Loane, Peter Mc Lean; Batch, Gould, Cox; Con: Gould 6 Drop: Ella

Club Universitario, Salta
Referee: Bruno Bertelli (Argentina)

Team details

Interior: Torno; Nogués, Rodríguez, Gasilica, San Martín; Virgolini, Basile; Bisio, Passaglia, Antonini; Casale, Mangiamelli; Irañeta, del Chazal (Bianchi), Michelli.
Australia: Gould; Crowe, Slack, Knight, Batch; Ella, Cox; T.Shaw, Loane (capt.), Cornelsen (Mathers); Hall, Peter Mc Lean; D'Arcy, Ros, Cooligan

20 October 1979

Buenos Aires RU	6–22	Australia
Try: Puccy; Con: G.Beccar Varela		Try: Cox, T.Shaw; M.O'Connor, Batch; Con: P.Mc.Lean 3

Ferro C. Oeste, Buenos Aires
Referee: Ricardo Colombo (Argentina)

Team details

Buenos Aires RU: E.García Terán; A.Puccio, C.Jacobi, G.Beccar Varela, C.Ramallo; G.Sanguinetti, M. Garcia Laborde; M.Negra, M.Glastra, G.Paz; C.Bottarini, B.Miguens; R.Ventura (capt.), J.Sarto, A.Cerioni.
Australia: Paul McLean; (R.Gould); P.Batch, A.Slack, M.O'Connor, B.Moon; T.Melrouse, P.Cox; T.Shaw, M.Loane (capt.), A.Stewart; Peter Mc Lean, M.Mathers; C.Handy, P.Hortan, S.Pilecki.

23 October 1979

Rosario RU	13–21	Australia
Try: Tallo, Basilico; Con: Baetti; Pen: Baetti		Try: Crowe (2); O'Connors; Pen: O'Connors (2); Drop: Melrose

Gimnasia y Esgrima (R)
Referee: Roberto Magnani (Argentina)

Team details

Rosario: Baetti; Nogués, Rodríguez, Escalante (capt.), Basílico Dip, Noccia; Tallo (Poet), Marengo, Imhoff; Mangiamelli, Milano; Sangionissi, Cheste (Cristini), Fernández.
Australia: Gould (Melrouse); Knight, Slack, O'Connors, Growe; Ella, Carson, Stewart, Loane (capt.), (Pilecki), Hall; Peter Mc Lean Mathers; Cooligan, Ross, D'Arcy.

=== First test ===
27 October 1979

Argentina	24–13	Australia
Try: Madero 2 Con: Porta; Pen: Porta; Drop: Porta (3)		Try: Crowe; Pen: Paul McLean 2 Drop: Melrose

Ferro C. Oeste, Buenos Aires
Attendance: 25,000
Referee: Steve Strydom (South Africa)

Team details

Argentina	Australia

Argentina			Australia
Martín Sansot	FB	15	FB	Paul McLean
Marcelo Campo	W	14	W	Phil Crowe
Rafael Madero	C	13	C	Michael O'Connor
Marcelo Loffreda	C	12	C	Andrew Slack
Adolfo Cappelletti	W	11	W	Brendan Moon
Hugo Porta (c)	FH	10	FH	Tony Melrose
Tomás Landajo	SH	9	SH	Phillip Cox
Héctor Silva	N8	8	N8	Mark Loane (c)
Tomás Petersen	F	7	F	Greg Cornelsen
Gabriel Travaglini	F	6	F	Andy Stewart
Marcos Iachetti	L	5	L	Tony Shaw
Alejandro Iachetti	L	4	L	Peter McLean
Fernando Morel	P	3	P	Chris Handy
Alejandro Cubelli	H	2	H	Peter Horton
Enrique Rodríguez	P	1	P	Stan Pilecki
		Replacements
Eduardo Sanguinetti	FB

30 October 1979

Cuyo RU	4–43	Australia
Try: Antonini		Try: Show 2, Moon 2 Melrose, O'Connors; Con: Melrose 4, M.O'Connor; Pen: Melorse 3

Club Marista, Mendoza
Referee: Felipe Ferrari (Argentina)

Team details

Cuyo RU: Muñiz; Carbonell, Foquet, Morgan, Ruffo; Curto, Basile; Antonini (Suárez Lagos) Orrigo y Bertona; Cásale (capt.) Irañeta; Michelle, Cichitti, Cruz.
Australia: Melrose; Mann, O'Connors, Knight, Batch; Ella, Carson (Cox); T.Shaw(capt.), Hall, Stewart; Mathers, D'Arcy; Cooligan, Ross, Pilecki.

=== Second Test ===
3 November 1979

Argentina	12–17	Australia
Try: Petersen; Con: Porta; Pen: Porta; Drop: Porta		Try: Batch, Moon (2); Con: Paul McLean; Pen: Paul McLean

Ferro C. Oeste, Buenos Aires
Attendance: 25,000
Referee: Steve Strydom (South Africa)

Team details

Argentina	Australia

Martín Sansot	FB	15	FB	Paul McLean
Marcelo Campo	W	14	W	Paddy Batch
Rafael Madero	C	13	C	Michael O'Connor
Marcelo Loffreda	C	12	C	Andrew Slack
Adolfo Cappelletti	W	11	W	Brendan Moon
Hugo Porta (c)	FH	10	FH	Tony Melrose
Tomás Landajo	SH	9	SH	Phillip Cox
Héctor Silva	N8	8	N8	Mark Loane (c)
Tomáas Petersen	F	7	F	Greg Cornelsen
Gabriel Travaglini	F	6	F	Andy Stewart
Marcos Iachetti	L	5	L	Tony Shaw
Alejandro Iachetti	L	4	L	Peter McLean
Fernando Morel	P	3	P	Chris Handy
Alejandro Cubelli	H	2	H	Bill Ross
Enrique Rodríguez	P	1	P	Stan Pilecki

== Gallery ==
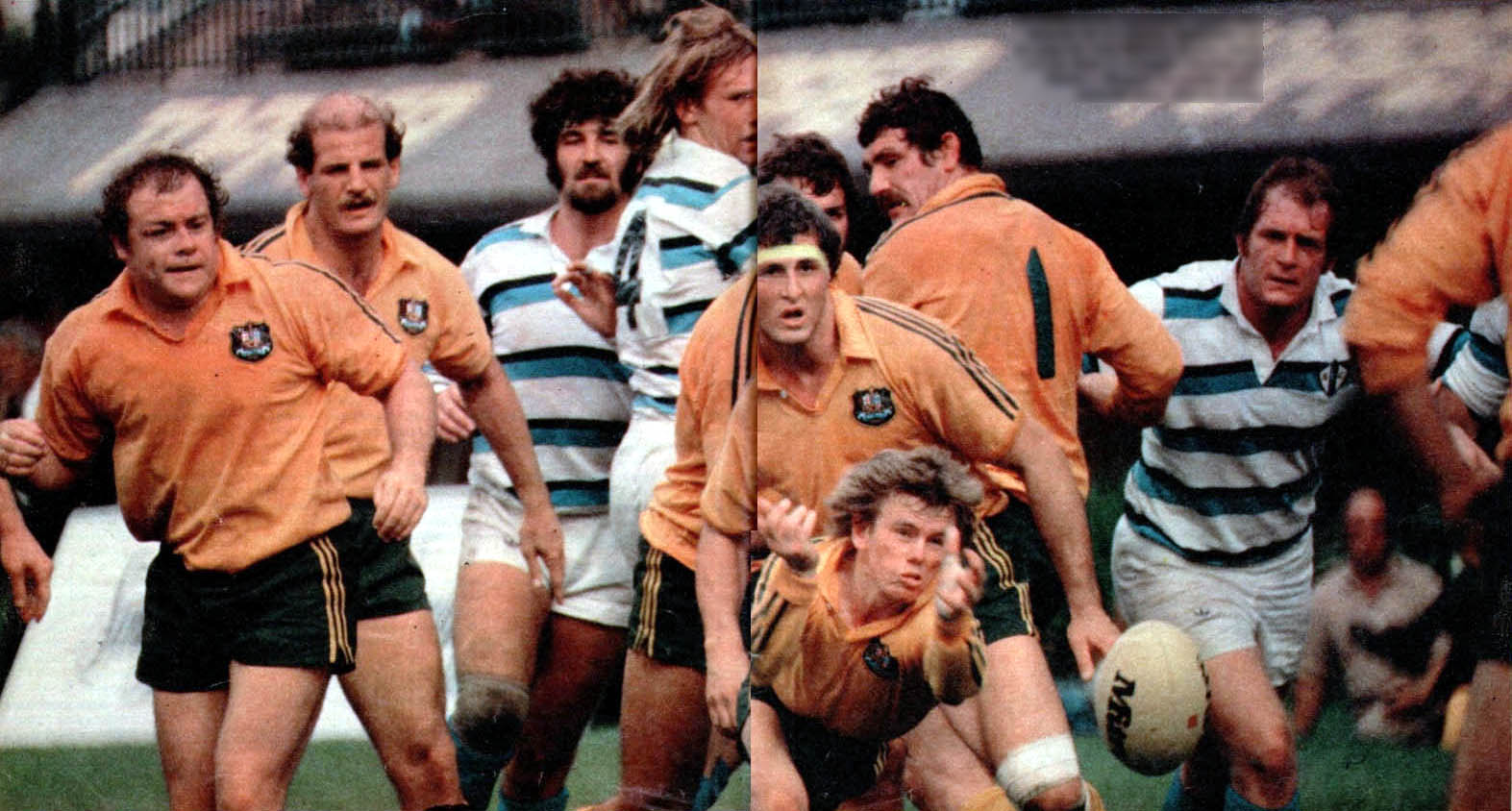
v San Isidro Club

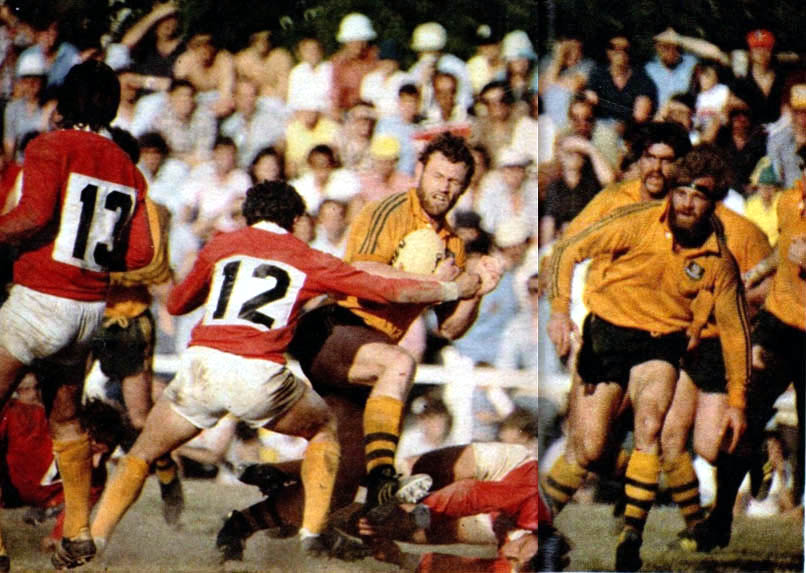
v Seleccionado Interior

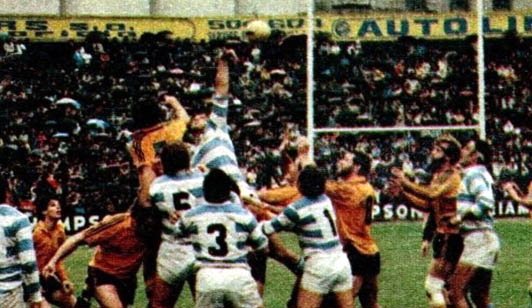
v Argentina (1st test)

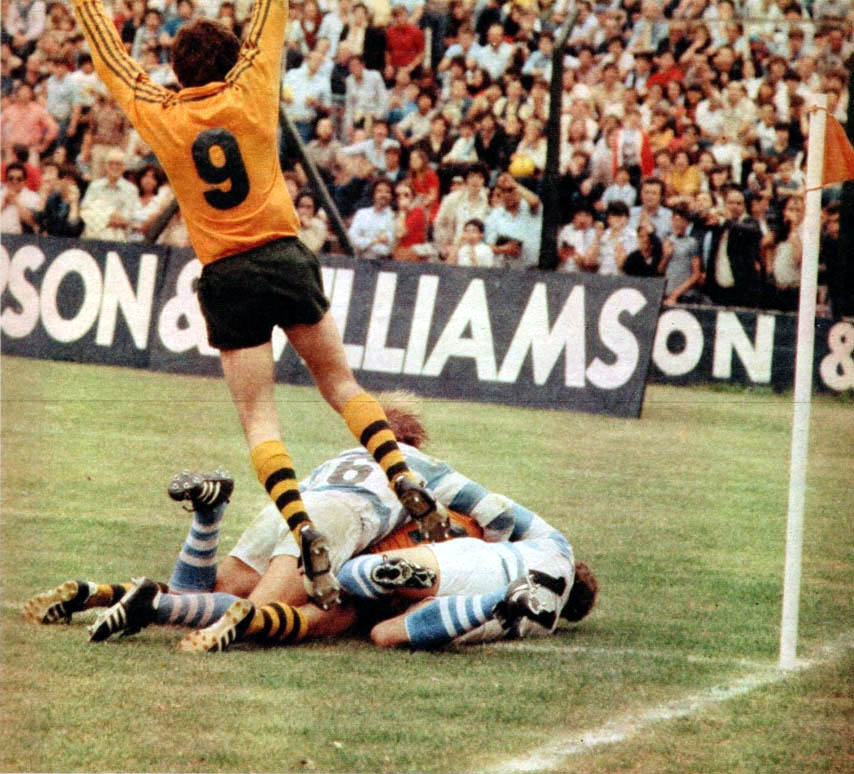
v Argentina (2nd test)
