= Tony Shaw (rugby union) =

Australia international rugby union player

Tony Shaw AM
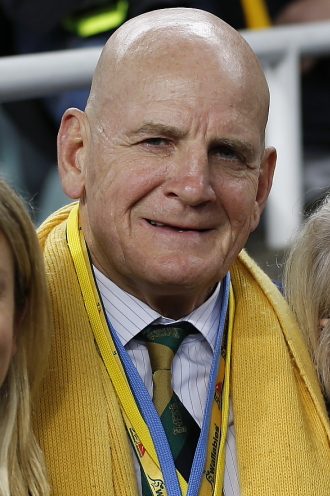
- Born: Anthony Alexander Shaw; 23 March 1953 (age 73) Brisbane, Queensland
- School: Gregory Terrace
- Notable relative: Andrew Shaw (son)

Rugby union career
- Position: Flanker
Senior career
Years	Team	Apps	(Points)
1973–85	Brisbane Brothers		
Provincial / State sides
Years	Team	Apps	(Points)
1973–82	Queensland	89	
International career
Years	Team	Apps	(Points)
1973–82	Australia	36	(8)

Anthony Alexander Shaw AM is an Australian former rugby union player. A Queensland state and national representative flanker, Shaw captained the national side consistently from 1978 to 1982.

== Early life and style ==
Tony Shaw was born 23 March 1953 in Brisbane, Queensland. His early rugby was played at St Joseph's College, Gregory Terrace in Brisbane. He was a proficient water-polo player and represented for Queensland in that sport.

Shaw's greatest rugby success was achieved at flanker, he was a hard driving forward who lead from the front and was an outstanding rucker and mauler. Howell asserts that although the standard of Australian representative sides during the early 1970s was less than consistently world-class, Shaw would have been competitive in the best All Black packs of that and any other era. Howell regards him as a cunning line-out technician who could outwit taller and more spring-heeled opponents. Queensland packs containing Shaw and Mark Loane dominated their New South Wales rivals in the late 1970s.

== Rugby career ==
Shaw was first selected for Queensland when Tonga visited in 1973. That year, aged 20 he was picked for the 1973 Australia rugby union tour of Europe and he played in the second-row in five games including his debut Test appearances against Wales and England.

Early in his career Shaw played at number-eight and although he was picked in the Queensland team of 1974 against the visiting All Blacks, Mark Loane was preferred by the selectors at number 8 for the three Test matches against those visitors. Shaw set out at that point to become the first-choice flanker in the national side. In 1975 he was back in the Australian team at breakaway for two domestic Tests against England and one against Japan. He made the 1975–76 Australia rugby union tour of Britain and Ireland and played in nineteen of the total twenty-six matches. He was the only back-rower to play in all five Test matches of the tour.

In 1976 he played against Fiji for Australia in three Tests. Wearing a Queensland jumper he also met Fiji and in that year's interstate series the Reds dominated New South Wales with a 42–4 victory. He made the 1976 Australia rugby union tour of Europe and played in eight of the ten games including the two Test losses to France. Coach Bob Templeton's tenure and the reputation of a number of senior players suffered as a result of the poor tour record but Shaw held his own and returned well regarded.

The new national coach Daryl Haberecht, in 1978 built his side around the leadership strength of Shaw and his Queensland back star Paul McLean. Shaw wasn't even the captain at his club side Brisbane Brothers and Mark Loane was the state captain but Haberecht valued Shaw's "blood & thunder" leadership style and Shaw debuted as national captain in two Tests against Wales, both won. The Wallaby forwards in those Tests were a pack of "hard-heads" who gave no quarter to the Welsh. They were Shaw, Loane, Greg Cornelsen, Garrick Fay, David Hillhouse, Stan Pilecki and Steve Finnane. Finnane was attributed with breaking Welsh prop Graham Price's jaw, in the brutal second Test.

Shaw was the squad and Test captain on the 1978 Australia rugby union tour of New Zealand on which coach Haberecht suffered a heart attack after the 2nd Test 6–22 loss. A mid-game rallying speech from Shaw inspired the Wallabies to a form turnaround that saw them win the 3rd Test in Auckland 30–16. In 1979 under new coach Dave Brockhoff, Loane led the Wallabies in a Test match in Sydney where they won the Bledisloe Cup for the first time in 45 years; Shaw played in that game. Shaw led Queensland in matches against Ireland and the NZ Maori, and played in two Tests against Ireland under Loane. Loane also led the Wallabies on the 1979 Australia rugby union tour of Argentina but Shaw played in six of the seven matches and captained Australia in a mid-week game.

In 1980 under Shaw's leadership the Wallabies won two of a three Test home series against the All Blacks and retained the Bledisloe Cup. Australian had further success under Shaw's leadership on a tour of Fiji that same year and hosting France in 1981 – all Tests were won. Shaw was selected to captain the Wallabies on the 1981–82 Australia rugby union tour of Britain and Ireland becoming the first Queenslander to captain the Wallabies on a tour of the Home Nations since his future father-in-law Bill McLean in 1947–48. Shaw would later marry McLean's daughter and made the 81–82 tour alongside Bill's son Peter and nephew Paul. Disaster struck for Shaw in the Test against Scotland when he retaliated recklessly to niggling from Scots player Bill Cuthbertson with a king-hit right in front of the referee and the TV cameras. This transgression would mark the end of Shaw's Test captaincy career. He was also dropped from the team following the Scottish Test.

Shaw played again for his country against Scotland in 1982 and against Argentina in 1983 but his rugby career ended in 1983 at age 31 following an appearance for the Queensland B team against the All Blacks. In total, Shaw played thirty-six tests for the Wallabies between 1973 and 1982. He made a further forty-eight tour match appearances including some matches as a lock or number eight. He captained the Aussies for fifteen Tests and a further fourteen international tour matches. He is Australian cap number 565. Howell regards Shaw and one of the greatest captains Australia has ever had.

== Accolades ==
Shaw was inducted into the Wallaby Hall of Fame in 2012 and was named as an Australian Rugby Union Classic Statesman that same year.

Preceded by Geoff Shaw	Australian national rugby union captain 1978–81	Succeeded by Mark Loane

== Published sources ==
- Howell, Max (2005) Born to Lead – Wallaby Test Captains, Celebrity Books, Auckland NZ
