= Peter Carson (rugby union) =

Australian rugby union international

- Full name: Peter John Carson
- Born: 10 March 1952 (age 74) Sydney, Australia

Rugby union career
- Position: Scrum-half
International career
| Years | Team | Apps | (Points) |
| 1979–80 | Australia | 2 | (4) |

Peter John Carson (born 10 March 1952) is an Australian former rugby union international.

Carson was born in Sydney and educated at Crows Nest Boys High School.

A scrum-half, Carson was capped twice for the Wallabies. He toured New Zealand in 1978 as an understudy to Rod Hauser and remained on the reserves bench on Ireland's visit the following year. Hauser then retired from international rugby and Carson made his debut in the one-off 1979 Bledisloe Cup match at the SCG, which the Wallabies won. On the tour of Argentina later that year, Carson had to withdraw from the 1st Test with sunburn, handing a debut to Phillip Cox. He had to wait until 1980 to regain his place, featuring in another win over the All Blacks in Sydney, with his second half try helping to seal the match. The recall of veteran scrum-half John Hipwell prevented Carson from gaining further caps.

== See also ==
- List of Australia national rugby union players
