= Ken McCurrach =

Australian rugby union player (1946–2026)

- Full name: Kenneth George McCurrach
- Born: 29 March 1946 Keith, Moray, Scotland
- Died: 17 June 2026 (aged 80) Sydney, New South Wales, Australia
- School: Harris Academy

Rugby union career
- Position: No. 8
International career
Years	Team	Apps	(Points)
1973	Australia		

Kenneth George McCurrach (29 March 1946 – 17 June 2026) was an Australian rugby union player.

== Biography ==
Born in Keith, Scotland, McCurrach was a number eight and learned his rugby as a schoolboy at Harris Academy in Dundee, earning Midlands Schools selection his final year. He gained further representative honours with Combined Scottish Universities while at Dundee University, before moving to Perth, Western Australia in 1969.

McCurrach played his rugby in Perth for the University of Western Australia and Perth-Bayswater. As a member of the Western Australian state team, McCurrach appeared against the All Blacks, Springboks and France, then in 1973 relocated to Sydney to further his career, joining Eastwood. The move immediately paid off when he made the 1973 Wallabies trial and he impressed enough to earn a place on the end of year tour of Europe. He played five uncapped matches during the tour and came close to selection for the Wales match, with Tony Shaw ultimately preferred.

McCurrach died on 17 June 2026, at the age of 80.
