= Tom Barker (rugby union) =

Australia international rugby union player

- Full name: Thomas Michael Barker
- Born: 15 June 1956 (age 70) Brisbane, Queensland
- School: Brisbane State High School

Rugby union career
- Position: Flanker / No. 8
International career
Years	Team	Apps	(Points)
1978	Australia		

Thomas Michael Barker (born 15 June 1956) is an Australian rugby union coach and former player.

Born in Brisbane, Barker was educated at Brisbane State High School and toured with Australian Schools in 1973/74.

Barker competed for Brisbane club Teachers-Norths, from where he gained selection in the 1977 Queensland side. He won a Wallabies call up for the 1978 tour of New Zealand, to replace injured number eight Mark Loane. His first appearance in Wallabies colours came against Mid-Canterbury, which was followed by two further tour matches, against Wanganui and Bay of Plenty. He was capped 25 times for Queensland before a nerve injury caused him to retire in 1981.

Since retiring, Barker has coached rugby union across Australia and in Japan. He is a former Queensland under 19s coach, led St Joseph's College, Nudgee to five GPS premierships, was an assistant to Eddie Jones at the Brumbies and in 2005 coached the undefeated Churchie premiership-winning team, which starred Quade Cooper and David Pocock.
