= Mark Loane =

Ophthalmologist and Australia international rugby union player

Mark Loane AM FRANZCO FRACS
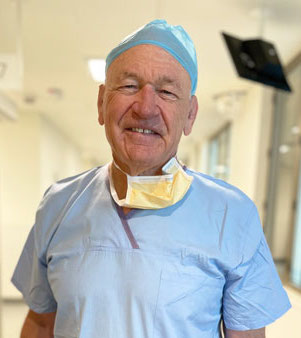
- Born: Mark Edward Loane; 11 July 1954 (age 72); Ipswich, Queensland, Australia
- Education: MBBS (UQ, 1977)
- Occupation: Ophthalmologist
- Years active: 40+ years
- Known for: Indigenous eye health and rugby union career
- Spouse: Elizabeth Loane
- Medical career
- Field: Corneal transplantation, cataract surgery and glaucoma treatment
- Institutions: Surgical, Treatment and Rehabilitation Service; Vision Eye Institute
- Awards: Member of the Order of Australia; Fellow of the College of Ophthalmologists; Fellow of the College of Surgeons
- Height: 6 ft 3 in (1.91 m)
- Weight: 233 lb (106 kg; 16 st 9 lb)
- School: St. Joseph's Nudgee College

Rugby union career
- Position: Flanker
Senior career
Years	Team	Apps	(Points)
1973–82	University		
Provincial / State sides
Years	Team	Apps	(Points)
1973–82	Queensland	89	
International career
Years	Team	Apps	(Points)
1973–82	Australia	28	(8)

Mark Edward Loane (born 11 July 1954) is an Australian ophthalmic surgeon and former rugby union player. He completed medical school and trained as an ophthalmologist in Queensland, where he continues to practise in both the public and private health systems. Loane was proclaimed Member of the Order of Australia in 2011 for his service to medicine, particularly Indigenous eye health.

During his time in rugby union, Loane played 89 games for Queensland and 28 Tests for the Wallabies. His sporting career has been described by Bret Harris as "the closest thing to a folk hero Queensland has seen", and was noted for his game-winning barging runs.

== Early life and family ==
The son of a judge who moved around Northern Queensland on judicial matters, Mark Loane was born in Ipswich, Queensland. He first attended Gympie Christian Brothers before being sent St. Joseph's Nudgee College as a boarder. He is married to Elizabeth Loane and has two daughters.

== Rugby career ==
Loane's senior rugby started in 1973 at the University of Queensland Rugby Club where he was coached by former Wallabies, Jules Guerassimoff and Chilla Wilson. State and national coach Bob Templeton was closely involved at the club. Loane came to Templeton's attention and was he selected aged eighteen to represent Australia when Tonga toured in 1973. He played in both Tests. The following year he made an appearance against the All Blacks.

In 1975 he played in a Test match against Japan and in two Tests against a touring England team. He was selected that year to make the 1975–76 Australia rugby union tour of Britain and Ireland led by John Hipwell. Loane played in consecutive tour matches 1 through 4 but was injured in the game against London Counties and missed a number of matches including the Scottish and Welsh Tests. He played in eight straight games when he recovered, including the Tests against England and Ireland.

In 1976 Loane played in all three Tests matches against the visiting Fijians and also captained Queensland against them. He was also selected for the short 1976 Australia rugby union tour of Europe under captain Geoff Shaw. Two years later when Wales visited Loane again captained Queensland against the visitors and played in two spiteful Test matches, both won. He made the 1978 Australia rugby union tour of New Zealand and although Loane was in the incumbent Queensland captain, his state rival Tony Shaw was selected by coach Daryl Haberecht as the squad's captain. Injury restricted Loane to just two tour match appearances against Hawkes Bay and Manawatu.

Loane's first Test as national captain was the 1979 Test against the All Blacks at the Sydney Cricket Ground which Australia won 12–6 to take back the Bledisloe Cup for the first time in 30 years. He also played against Ireland in two Tests and again captained the Queensland state side. That year the ARU showed full confidence in his leadership selecting him as squad captain for the 1979 Australia rugby union tour of Argentina, the first Wallaby tour to South America. He played in six of the seven matches including both Tests, for one win and one loss.

His role in University's 1979 Grand Final victory will be remembered. The first Grand Final was drawn after extra time against traditional rivals, Brothers, and another match was scheduled for the following week to decide the victors. In all, 200 minutes of rugby had to be played before the victory could be celebrated. Once he had completed his medical studies in 1980 Loane relocated to South Africa to gain medical experience. He played rugby there in the Currie Cup and was selected as a junior Springbok. On his return to Australia in 1981 he immediately went into the Test team against France and captained Queensland against Italy.

Howell asserts that Loane's career peaked in 1981 when at aged 27 he was selected under the captaincy of his state arch-rival Tony Shaw on the 1981–82 Australia rugby union tour of Britain and Ireland. Loane would captain the side in the Test against England when Shaw was dropped from the team following the Scottish Test. Shaw had retaliated recklessly to niggling from Scots player Bill Cuthbertson with a king-hit right in front of the referee. Shaw was to pay dearly for this as it would mark the end of his Test captaincy career. Loane also captained the side in four tour matches.

Later that year Loane's stellar career came to an end after he captained Queensland and then Australia in two Tests against the visiting Scottish national side. All told Loane captained Australia for six Tests and seven other tour matches between 1979 and 1982. He captained Queensland in many matches against touring sides and in several distinctive wins over NSW from the late 70s until 1982.

== Professional medical career ==
Loane graduated from the School of Medicine at the University of Queensland in 1977, before going on to complete his ophthalmology training in Queensland. He proceeded to complete Fellowships in both corneal transplantation and external eye disease (Flinders Medical Centre, South Australia) and in glaucoma (University of California San Diego, US). He has since performed more than 20,000 procedures.

Loane is an ophthalmologist and practising surgeon in the Queensland public healthcare system, as well as the private system. He is a Fellow of both the Royal Australian and New Zealand College of Ophthalmologists (RANZCO) and the Royal Australian College of Surgeons, and specialises in cataract surgery and glaucoma treatment. He works at the Surgical, Treatment and Rehabilitation Service in Herston. Loane practices in the private system through the Vision Eye Institute.

Loane has been involved in a number of charitable organisations and works, including serving as chair for the RANZCO Eye Foundation and as a board member for Guide Dogs Queensland. He also is the head of the Cape York Regional Eye Health Project, which provides specialist ophthalmic care to remote Indigenous communities in the Cape York Peninsula. The Cape York Eye Health Project was established in 1999 and visits 29 remote communities every year. Loane was awarded Membership of the Order of Australia (AM) in 2011 for his service to Indigenous health and to medicine through the project.

== Accolades ==
On 23 September 2000, Loane was awarded with the Australian Sports Medal for having played more than 50 games for Queensland and for his contribution to the development of rugby in Queensland. In 2007 he was honoured in the third tranche of inductees into the Australian Rugby Union Hall of Fame.

On 26 January 2011, Loane was named as Member of the Order of Australia for service to medicine in the field of ophthalmology, particularly to the indigenous communities of northern Queensland, and as a contributor to the development of sustainable health services.

== Published sources ==
- Fitzsimons, Peter (2001) John Eales: The Biography
- Howell, Max (2005) Born to Lead – Wallaby Test Captains, Celebrity Books, Auckland NZ

Preceded by Tony Shaw	Australian national rugby union captain 1979-82	Succeeded by Paul McLean
