= Rob Onus =

Australia international rugby union player (born 1954)

- Full name: Robert Lester Onus
- Born: 30 November 1954 (age 71) Sydney, Australia
- Height: 191 cm (6 ft 3 in)
- School: The King's School

Rugby union career
- Position: No. 8 / Lock
International career
Years	Team	Apps	(Points)
1978	Australia		

Robert Lester Onus (born 30 November 1954) is an Australian former rugby union player.

Onus grew up near Moree in country New South Wales and completed his schooling in Sydney at The King's School, Parramatta, where he had two years with the 1st XV. He then returned home and played for Moree and a Central North Kookaburras regional side that won three successive NSW Country Championships.

A forward, Onus made his NSW representative debut in 1977 and the same year toured overseas alongside his brother Charlie with NSW Country. He won a Wallabies call up for the 1978 tour of New Zealand, making uncapped appearances against Nelson Bays, Southland, Counties Manukau, Mid-Canterbury and Wanganui.
