= Kingsgrove North High School =

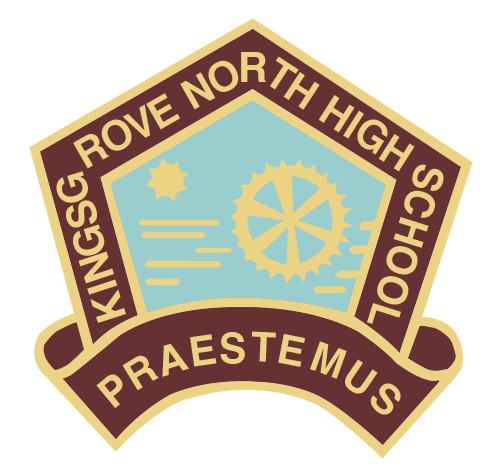

Location
- 2-10 St Albans Road; Kingsgrove, New South Wales; Australia; 33°56′51″S 151°6′5″E

Information
- Type: Public, co-educational day school, secondary school
- Motto: Latin: Praestemus (May We Excel)
- Established: 1959; 67 years ago
- Sister school: Apgujeong High School, Seoul Le Hong Phong High School, Ho Chi Minh City No.2 Miyun High School, Beijing
- Educational authority: NSW Department of Education
- Principal: Jim Mallios
- Teaching staff: ~90
- Years offered: 7–12
- Enrolment: c. 961 (2024)
- Campus type: Suburban
- Colours: Maroon and blue
- Newspaper: The Way North
- Website: kingsgrovn-h.schools.nsw.gov.au

Kingsgrove North High School (abbreviated as KNHS) is a co-educational public high school located in Kingsgrove, New South Wales, Australia and founded in 1959. The school is part of the St. George Region of high schools and is administered by the New South Wales Department of Education.

== History ==
The school was established in 1959 to relieve overcrowding in existing schools and given the name Kingsgrove North by a Committee of P & C. Stage1 of the building, consisting of blocks "B" & "C" was constructed by Monier Builders Ltd at the cost of £189,153. The Manual Arts block, also included in Stage 1, was not begun until 28 February. The first KNHS Headmaster was Errol Johnston and the first school captains were Ron Graham (1960–1963) and Judith Timmins (1960–1961). The school badge is based on suggestions from teachers and students and consists of a "rotary wheel" that represents the wheel of industry and "surrounding stars" to indicate hard work to achieve high goals. The school pledge was composed in 1961 by a school teacher and consists of: The future is a challenge, let us excel our lives with power and purpose, let us excel. The prefect's pledge was introduced in 1962 and says: "I promise at all times and in all places, to maintain the honour of the school; that with sincerity, justice and integrity, I will discharge my duties; so that in these things I shall excel, for what I am, this school will be." The school received the Director General's Award for Excellence in 2004 and 2005 and a National Award for Quality Schooling in 2007.

== Description ==
The school is situated in Kingsgrove, a suburb of southern Sydney. Its main entrance is located on the southwest corner of the school. The campus is built around a main quadrangle, another cluster of buildings around a smaller quadrangle, with an oval and sporting facilities. The school has three quadrangles – Main Quad, Eastern Quad and the Senior Quad. In 2011, KNHS was one of the seven schools selected to be part of the "Confucius Classrooms" project which aims to promote the learning of Mandarin and to consolidate the multicultural harmony within the school. This involved forming strong bilateral ties with sister schools in China.

== Student life ==
Of the student population, around 90% are from a non-English-speaking background, predominantly Chinese, Vietnamese, Greek, and Lebanese language groups. There is also a substantial minority of European, Indian and Sri Lankan students. According to the school, its student population represents 47 different cultural backgrounds. Kingsgrove North, in addition to local pupils accept international students, predominantly from China and Vietnam through the Intensive English Centre (IEC) and implements a transition program for those coming from abroad.

=== Sport ===
Kingsgrove North High School is part of the St George Secondary Schools Sports Association and competes on a zone, regional and state level. The school offers basketball, volleyball, table tennis, OZ tag, football, tennis, softball, soccer, bowling and squash.

=== Student clubs ===
- The Model Making Club which meets every week to construct models of famous battles such as the Battle of Thermopylae
- Bring it On – Dance club which meets every Wednesday to practice and perform dance routines. The school's dance group consistently reaches state finals in dance competitions.
- School Band – Directed by the Music faculty performs items on rock and pop with guidance from bands performers on Australian Idol.
- The Political Science Club meets each week to discuss political theory and current political events.

=== Leadership ===
- Max Potential – A program by Future Achievement Australia to develop leaders in the community through designing and undertaking a community service project.
- SARN – The Social Anti Racism Network promotes anti-racism and harmony within the school community and meets with other schools in the region to discuss plans to combat racism.
- YMCA NSW Youth Parliament – The school has representation in both the Youth State Constitutional Convention for the local electorate and the YMCA Youth Parliament. (Legislative Assembly and Legislative Council)

== Notable alumni ==
- Tim Cahill – football player; represented Socceroos; played internationally
- Ronald Graham – rugby player; represented Wallabies; played internationally, former president of the Australian Rugby Union
- Mitchell Kilduff – swimmer; represented Australia at the Paralympics
- Tom Panos – auctioneer; on the Channel 9 Show, The Block
- Alex Dimitriades – actor

== Notable staff ==
- Jack Danzey

== See also ==
- List of government schools in New South Wales
- Education in Australia
