= Geoff Shaw (rugby union) =

Australia rugby union player (born 1948)

- Born: Geoffrey Arnold Shaw; 27 December 1948 (age 77) Kiama, New South Wales
- School: Edmund Rice College

Rugby union career
- Position: Centre
Amateur team(s)
Years	Team	Apps	(Points)
- Illawarra
1972	Port Elizabeth		
1977–80	University of Queensland		
Provincial / State sides
Years	Team	Apps	(Points)
1969-76	New South Wales	22	
1977-80	Queensland	47	
International career
Years	Team	Apps	(Points)
1969-1979	Australia	27	

Geoffrey Arnold Shaw (born 27 December 1948) is an Australian former national representative rugby union player who played for and captained the Wallabies. He made state representative appearances for both New South Wales and Queensland over an eleven-year period from 1969.

== Rugby career ==
From the Illawarra region as a nineteen-year-old Shaw first represented New South Wales Country against New Zealand in 1968. The following year he debuted for Australia in a Test match against Wales. In that same year 1969, Shaw was selected to tour with the Wallabies on the 1969 Australia rugby union tour of South Africa. Shaw was one of the new boys in the squad and at 20 years old, the youngest. He played in sixteen of the twenty-six matches including one Test match.

In 1970 Scotland toured Australia and Shaw went up against them for New South Wales, New South Wales Country and the Wallabies in one Test for a 23–3 victory. In 1971 Shaw played against the British & Irish Lions for New South Wales and against the visiting Springboks on the infamous tour which the subject of widespread anti-apartheid demonstrations. Shaw captained New South Wales Country against them, and was selected in the New South Wales side and the Australian side for all three Test matches. Shaw made the ten match 1971 Australia rugby union tour of France and played in both Tests and four tour matches.

Shaw married in 1972 and took a long sabbatical with his wife to South Africa, the British Isles and Europe. He made the Eastern Currie Cup team and the Junior Springboks. Shaw played for London Scottish and picked up matches in France and Italy.

On his return to Australian in 1973 he was selected for the nine-match 1973 Australia rugby union tour of Europe. He played in eight of the nine matches, including both Tests. In 1974 he matched up against the All Blacks five time when they visited Australia, for New South Wales Country, New South Wales and in all three Test matches. In 1975 when Japan visited Shaw played in both Tests and in the 2nd Test match with John Hipwell out, Shaw was first honoured the captaincy of the national side. He led them to a 50–25 victory in Brisbane.

On the 1975–76 Australia rugby union tour of Britain and Ireland John Hipwell was the squad captain. Hipwell would captain the team in two Tests (Scotland and Wales) and in nine mid-week matches. An injury he suffered in the North-Eastern Counties game resulted in serious damage to the cruciate ligaments in his leg, caused him to be replaced in the Wales Test and ended his playing involvement on tour. Geoff Shaw took over the captaincy from Hipwell and led the side in six mid-week matches as well as the England, Ireland and USA Tests. When Fiji arrived in 1976, Shaw captained the Wallabies three times securing three victories. This led to his selection as touring captain to France and Italy on the 1976 Australia rugby union tour of Europe. France won both Tests.

Following the tour Shaw relocated from New South Wales to Queensland and he eventually made forty-seven representative appearances for the state. He made tours with the Queensland team to New Zealand in 1977; Japan, British Columbia & the US in 1978 and to The UK and Europe in 1980. At home he figured in representative appearances for Queensland against the New Zealand Maori, Ireland and the All Blacks. Howell quotes from Bret Harris' book Marauding Maroons when describing this twilight period of Shaw's career:

Shaw was a fine tactician and totally reliable under pressure. A big, burly centre, he was punishing in both attack and defence. he was also a skilled ball-handler and played the game with unusual finesse for a man of his bulk. Shaw provided the Queensland backline with authority and relieved the pressure which had been mounting on Paul McLean's young shoulders. All of the Maroons drew confidence from Shaw's presence on the field.

— Bret Harris, Marauding Maroons, 1982.

In 1979 Shaw played his final Test for the Wallabies against the All Blacks in Sydney - a notable match which the Wallabies won 12-6. In total Shaw notched up sixty-eight matches for Australia, including twenty-seven Tests. He captained Australia on nine occasions as well as in a further twelve non-Test touring matches.

== International career ==
- International Debut: Saturday, 21/06/1969 v Wales (Sydney) lost 16-19 - (Aged: 20)
- Final Appearance: 28/07/1979 v New Zealand (Sydney) won 16-6 (Aged: 30)
- Wallaby Number: 526
- 27 Australian Caps: 1968-82 Played: 27, Won: 12, Drew: 1, Lost: 14. Test Points: 8. Tries: 27

== Accolades ==
He was honoured as an ARU Classic Wallaby Statesman in 2011. He was the 25th inductee to the Wallaby Hall of Fame and was inducted in 2012.

== Published sources ==
- Howell, Max (2005) Born to Lead – Wallaby Test Captains, Celebrity Books, Auckland NZ

Preceded by John Hipwell	Australian national rugby union captain 1975-76	Succeeded by Tony Shaw
