= Barry Stumbles =

Australian rugby union international

- Full name: Barry Donald Stumbles
- Born: 29 September 1948 (age 78) Canberra, Australia
- Height: 6 ft 4 in (193 cm)
- Occupation: Teacher

Rugby union career
- Position: Lock / Back row
International career
Years	Team	Apps	(Points)
1972	Australia	4	(4)
- Rugby league career

Playing information
- Position: Second row
Club
Years	Team	Pld	T	G	FG	P
1974	St. George Dragons	5				3

Barry Donald Stumbles (born 29 September 1948) is an Australian former rugby union international who represented Australia in four Test matches. He also played rugby league for the St. George Dragons.

Born in Canberra, Stumbles was educated at Canberra High School, for which he played 1st XV rugby union while a junior school student. He played as a back rower or lock and was a good performer in line outs. Initially playing first-grade for ACT club Northern Suburbs, after moving to Sydney he represented Western Suburbs and St. George.

Stumbles gained his first Wallabies call up for the 1971 tour of France, where he remained outside of Test selection. His break came on the 1972 tour of New Zealand, with an injury to Peter Sullivan giving him a debut off the bench in the 1st Test at Wellington. He contributed well enough to earn a place as starting lock for the 2nd Test at Christchurch, before switching to No. 8 for the 3rd Test at Auckland. The touring party then visited Fiji and he scored his only Test try in a two-point win over the home side at Suva.

Switching to rugby league in 1974, Stumbles made five first-grade appearances for the St. George Dragons in that year's NSWRFL season. He was used as a second rower by St. George and earned plaudits for his performance in a win over Balmain at a muddy Kogarah Oval.

== See also ==
- List of Australia national rugby union players
