= Michael Fitzgerald (rugby union, born 1955) =

- Full name: Michael Antony Fitzgerald
- Born: 30 March 1955 (age 71) Sydney, Australia
- School: Monaro High School

Rugby union career
- Position: Fullback
International career
Years	Team	Apps	(Points)
1975–76	Australia		

Michael Antony Fitzgerald (born 30 March 1955) is an Australian former rugby union player.

Fitzgerald was born in Sydney and educated at Monaro High School in the town of Cooma. He played under-age representative rugby for the ACT and after leaving school moved to Newcastle, where he competed for Waratah. A fullback, Fitzgerald was in the New South Wales Country XV that beating the touring 1975 England national team, before gaining full state honours for their fixture against Queensland.

A member of the 1975–76 Wallabies squad, Fitzgerald was one of three fullbacks chosen for a tour of Great Britain, Ireland and the United States, while still only 20 years of age. He was due to play the first match of the tour against Oxford University until straining his hamstring during training and instead got rested. His debut in Wallabies colours came against Ulster in Belfast and he had the team's kicking duties, converting all four tries. He broke down with another leg injury in his next match and was ruled out for the remainder of the tour.

Fitzgerald returned to England in 1977 to play rugby with London club Wasps.
