= Ross Turnbull (rugby union) =

Australian rugby union player

- Born: Ross Vincent Turnbull; 13 November 1941 Newcastle, New South Wales
- Died: 7 March 2015 (aged 73) Sydney, Australia

Rugby union career
- Position: Prop
International career
Years	Team	Apps	(Points)
1968	Wallabies	1	(0)

Ross Vincent Turnbull was a rugby union player who represented Australia against Ireland in one test match in 1968.

Turnbull, a prop, was born in Newcastle, New South Wales. He was the tour manager for the 1975–76 Australia rugby union tour of Britain and Ireland and the 1978 Australia rugby union tour of New Zealand.
