= David Rathie =

Australian sportsman

- Born: David Stewart Rathie; 29 May 1951 Roma, Queensland
- School: Anglican Church Grammar School

Rugby union career
- Position: centre
International career
| Years | Team | Apps | (Points) |
| 1972 | Wallabies | 2 | (0) |
- Cricket career

Cricket information
- Batting: Right-handed
- Bowling: Right-arm off-break
- Role: Batsman

Domestic team information
- Years: Team
- 1970/71–1980/81: Queensland
- 1979/80: Canterbury

Career statistics
| Competition | First-class | List A |
|---|---|---|
| Matches | 14 | 2 |
| Runs scored | 344 | 38 |
| Batting average | 14.33 | 19.00 |
| 100s/50s | 0/1 | 0/0 |
| Top score | 55 | 26 |
| Catches/stumpings | 7/– | 0/– |
- Source: CricketArchive, 15 April 2010

David Stewart Rathie (born 29 May 1951) is a former Australian sportsperson who represented the Wallabies in rugby union and played first-class cricket with both Queensland in the Sheffield Shield and Canterbury in the Shell Trophy.

== Early life ==
Rathie was born in Roma, Queensland, and educated at the Anglican Church Grammar School.

== Rugby union career ==
In 1970–71, Rathie toured France with the Australian rugby team but wasn't capped. An inside centre, he made his Test debut in a draw at the Sydney Cricket Ground on 17 June 1972, when Australia met France again, this time on home soil. His partner in the centre, Dave Burnet, was also making his debut. A week later, Rathie was capped again in another close encounter, this time at Ballymore Stadium at his home city Brisbane which the Wallabies lost by a point.

An articled clerk by profession, Rathie moved to Sydney to work but was also capped three times for the New South Wales Waratahs in 1978.

== Cricket career ==
Rathie made two appearances with Queensland in the 1970–71 Sheffield Shield season but didn't play at first-class level again for three years. Rathie played first-class cricket again in the 1979–80 season, playing six matches for Canterbury in New Zealand's Shell Trophy. He played once more for Queensland when he returned to Australia, against the touring Indian team in December 1980. Opening the batting, he was dismissed cheaply in both innings by Karsan Ghavri and Roger Binny respectively, but took a catch to dismiss Sunil Gavaskar.
