= Andy Stewart (rugby union) =

Australian rugby union international

- Full name: Andrew Alec Stewart
- Born: 16 June 1953 (age 73) Sydney, Australia

Rugby union career
- Position: Flanker
International career
Years	Team	Apps	(Points)
1979	Australia	3	(0)

Andrew Alec Stewart (born 16 June 1953) is an Australian former rugby union international.

Educated at North Sydney Boys High School, Stewart was an openside flanker and played first-grade for Norths.

Stewart was capped three times for the Wallabies. His extra pace helped earn him a Test debut against the All Blacks at the Sydney Cricket Ground in 1979 and he put in a commendable performances in a Wallabies win, which secured the Bledisloe Cup for the first time in 30 years. He gained two further caps on the 1979 tour of Argentina.

== See also ==
- List of Australia national rugby union players
