= John Bain (rugby union) =

John Bain OAM
- Full name: John Gordon Bain
- Born: 17 September 1927 Sydney, NSW, Australia
- Died: 2 July 2013 (aged 85)
- Height: 5 ft 8 in (173 cm)
- Weight: 190 lb (86 kg)
- School: Sydney Grammar School

Rugby union career
- Position: Hooker
Provincial / State sides
Years	Team	Apps	(Points)
- New South Wales
International career
Years	Team	Apps	(Points)
1953	Australia		

John Gordon Bain OAM (17 September 1927 – 2 July 2013) was an Australian international rugby union player.

Bain was born in Sydney and educated at Sydney Grammar School.

A hooker, Bain was converted from a loosehead prop as an Eastwood junior, before establishing himself in first-grade for the recently formed club in 1948. He became Eastwood's first Wallaby in 1953 when he was selected for the tour of South Africa, where he made 11 appearances, but was unable to displace Jim Walsh as hooker for the Test matches.

Bain was the Wallabies chairman of selectors between 1974 and 1990 and served as team manager during the 1976 tour of France. For his contributions to rugby, Bain held Australian Rugby Union honorary life membership and in 1993 was awarded the Medal of the Order of Australia (OAM).

== See also ==
- List of Australia national rugby union players
