= Steve Streeter =

Australian rugby union international

- Full name: Stephen Frederick Streeter
- Born: 2 March 1955 (age 71) Bowral, NSW, Australia
- School: Bowral High School
- Occupation: Finance

Rugby union career
- Position: Wing
International career
Years	Team	Apps	(Points)
1978	Australia	1	(0)

Stephen Frederick Streeter (born 2 March 1955) is an Australian former rugby union international.

Streeter, born in Bowral, attended Bowral High School and was a New South Wales schoolboy rugby league representative, not switching to rugby union until 1975. He was introduced to the sport at the Kiama Sevens.

A winger, Streeter represented his country for the first time in 1976 at the inaugural Hong Kong Sevens, where he scored the tournament's first ever try. He gained his only Wallabies cap on the 1978 tour of New Zealand, playing on the left wing in the first Bledisloe Cup match at Wellington. After losing his place for the next Test, he suffered a bad concussion in a tour match against Whanganui, which ended his tour. He was long-serving captain of New South Wales Country.

== See also ==
- List of Australia national rugby union players
