= Fernando Morel =

Argentine rugby union player

- Born: July 1, 1958 (age 68) Buenos Aires, Argentina

Rugby union career
- Position: Prop
Senior career
Years	Team	Apps	(Points)
-	CASI		
International career
Years	Team	Apps	(Points)
1979-1987	Argentina	19	(0)
Coaching career
- Years: Team
- 2008-2009: CASI

Fernando Morel (born Buenos Aires, 1 July 1958), is an Argentine retired rugby union player and coach. He played as a prop.

== Career ==
Morel spent his sports career in Club Atlético San Isidro, with which he won three URBA titles in the 1980s; he debuted in the Argentine national team in 1979 at Buenos Aires during a historical victory against Australia. With the Pumas' jersey, Morel won two South America Rugby Championships in 1985 and 1987, and took part at the 1987 Rugby World Cup, during which he played his last international match, against Fiji.

After the player career, Morel took the coaching career; in 2008-2009, Morel replaced Santiago Phelan as coach of his former club, Club Atlético San Isidro.
