= John Weatherstone =

Australia international rugby union player

- Born: Laurence John Weatherstone; 13 March 1950 (age 76) Mullion, New South Wales, Australia

Rugby union career
- Position: centre
International career
Years	Team	Apps	(Points)
1975–76	Wallabies	7	(8)

Laurence John Weatherstone (born 13 March 1950) is a former rugby union player who represented Australia.

Weatherstone, a centre, was born in Bathurst, New South Wales and claimed a total of 7 international rugby caps for Australia.
