= Gary Grey =

Australian rugby union international

- Full name: Gareth Owen Grey
- Born: 29 September 1947 (age 79) Kiama, NSW, Australia

Rugby union career
- Position: Scrum-half
International career
Years	Team	Apps	(Points)
1972	Australia	5	(0)

Gareth Owen Grey (born 29 September 1947) is an Australian former rugby union international.

Grey was born in Kiama, New South Wales and educated at Hurlstone Agricultural College.

A diminutive scrum-half, Grey gained five caps for the Wallabies. He was on the 1971 tour of France, but all his caps came the following year, debuting off the bench against France at Ballymore. His positional rival John Hipwell was a withdrawal from the tour of New Zealand that followed, giving Grey an opportunity to start all three Tests, before he made his final Wallabies appearance in a win over Fiji in Suva. He was a late call up for the 1975–76 tour of Britain and Ireland.

Grey was a dairy farmer by trade.

== See also ==
- List of Australia national rugby union players
