= Brian Mansfield (rugby union) =

- Born: Brian William Mansfield; 8 November 1948 Moree, New South Wales

Rugby union career
- Position: lock
International career
Years	Team	Apps	(Points)
1975	Wallabies	1	(0)

Brian William Mansfield (born 8 November 1948) was a rugby union player who represented Australia.

Mansfield, a lock, was born in Moree, New South Wales and claimed 1 international rugby cap for Australia.
