= Dick Cocks =

Australian rugby union international

- Full name: Michael Richard Cocks
- Born: 1 March 1945 (age 81) New South Wales, Australia

Rugby union career
- Position: Flanker / No. 8
International career
Years	Team	Apps	(Points)
1972–75	Australia	10	(0)

Michael Richard Cocks (born 1 March 1945) is an Australian former rugby union international.

A Gosford High School product, Cocks played as a loose forward and was capped 10 times for the Wallabies between 1972 and 1975. After first gaining experience as a reserve on the 1969 tour of South Africa, he made his Wallabies debut in the 1972 home Tests against France, featuring in both matches. His international career included caps on the 1972 tour of New Zealand and the 1973 tour of Britain, where he captained the Wallabies in a tour match against the South and South-West Counties side in Bath.

Cocks, a teacher by profession, has had a long association with South Africa. He played club rugby for Cape Town club Villagers in 1971, making three representative appearances for Western Province at this time, then captained Natal on his return to the country after the end of his Wallabies career. His wife is a South African. They met during his time as a teacher at Westville Boys' High School in the 1980s.

== See also ==
- List of Australia national rugby union players
