= Glenn Eisenhauer =

Australian rugby union player and official

Glenn Sinclair Eisenhauer (born 1947) is an Australian former national and state rugby union player and official.

Eisenhauer attended Barker College and played centre for the 1st XV. He then worked in various rural areas where he played rugby for Warren, Cowra, Young and Armidale rugby clubs, as well as playing two seasons with Eastern Suburbs in the mid-1960s. He played for NSW Country from 1969 to 1978, playing lock and No. 8 position. Selected for the 16-week 1975–76 Australia rugby union tour of Britain and Ireland tour to the northern hemisphere, injury prevented him from playing a Test. He played for NSW against Fiji and toured with the Wallabies to France and Italy in 1976. After retiring from rugby, Eisenhauer worked as a grazier. He served as a selector for NSW Country and managed the team from 1990 to 1992.
