= Terry Casey (rugby union) =

Australia international rugby union player (born 1938)

- Full name: Terence Vincent Casey
- Born: 25 July 1938 (age 88) Leeton, NSW, Australia

Rugby union career
- Position: Fullback
International career
| Years | Team | Apps | (Points) |
| 1963–64 | Australia | 6 | (31) |

Terence Vincent Casey (born 25 July 1938) is an Australian former rugby union international.

Casey was born in Leeton in the Riverina region of New South Wales and attended St Patrick's College, Goulburn from 1950 to 1955, making the first XV at age 15. A goal-kicking fullback, Casey played first-grade for Sydney club St. George.

Capped six times by the Wallabies, Casey debuted on the 1963 tour of South Africa, featuring in all three of the four Test matches. He was one of Australia's best players in the 3rd Test at Ellis Park, with a drop goal, try and sideline conversion, helping them to a 11–9 win. His other three caps came on the 1964 tour of New Zealand and he accumulated 11 points in a win over the All Blacks in Wellington. A knee injury caused him to withdraw from the 1966–67 tour of Britain and France, after he had been picked in the squad subject to fitness tests.

== See also ==
- List of Australia national rugby union players
