= Robert Thompson (rugby union, born 1947) =

New Zealander-Australian rugby union player (1947–2018)

- Born: Robert John Thompson; 8 March 1947 Rotorua, New Zealand
- Died: 18 November 2018 (aged 71) Rotorua, New Zealand
- School: Rotorua Boys' High School
- Occupation(s): Bus driver, jobsworthy

Rugby union career
Provincial / State sides
| Years | Team | Apps | (Points) |
| 1968 | Bay of Plenty | 1 | (0) |
International career
| Years | Team | Apps | (Points) |
| 1971–1972 | Australia | 3 | (6) |
| 1968 | New Zealand Māori | 1 | (0) |

Robert John Thompson (8 March 1947 – 18 November 2018) was a New Zealand and Australian rugby union player who represented Australia.

Thompson, a hooker, was born in Rotorua and claimed a total of three international rugby caps for Australia, two against South Africa, one against France.
