= John Berne =

Australia rugby union and league player (1954–2026)

Personal information
- Born: John Edward Berne; 14 March 1954 County Antrim, Northern Ireland.
- Died: 13 July 2026 (aged 72) Sydney, New South Wales, Australia

Playing information
- Position: Centre
Club
Years	Team	Pld	T	G	FG	P
1976–1979	South Sydney	73				43
1980	Eastern Suburbs	24				8
1981–1983	Cronulla-Sutherland	28				21
1985	Eastern Suburbs
	Total	125	0	0	0	72

Rugby union career
- Position: centre
International career
Years	Team	Apps	(Points)
1975	Australia	1	(0)

John Edward Berne (14 March 1954 – 13 July 2026) was a British-born Australian rugby union and rugby league player who represented Australia in rugby union. Berne, a centre, claimed one international rugby cap for Australia. In rugby league, Berne represented South Sydney Rabbitohs from 1976 to 1979, Eastern Suburbs Roosters in 1980 and 1985, and Cronulla-Sutherland Sharks from 1981 to 1983 also primarily as a centre.

== Biography ==
Berne was born on 14 March 1954 in Anderstown, Belfast, County Antrim, Northern Ireland to Gerald and Mary Berne. He has four brothers. In 1961, his family relocated to Australia. Berne attended school at Marist Brothers, Pagewood, where he was introduced to the Rugby League. Throughout middle school, he represented both the Marist midweek and South Sydney in the Under 15 Years S G Ball Competition. He then went on to play for MBP as a senior in school.

In 1972, when he was 18 years old, he presented himself to the Randwick Club, but was advised to spend a year with the Colts due to his lack of experience. Instead, he went back to join the South Sydney Jersey Flegg Team. He also played some Third Grade matches for the Souths as an amateur rugby player.

=== Personal life and death ===
In 1978, Berne married Anne Hickman. Anne is the grand-niece of the Rugby League Test centre Dave Brown. The couple have two sons (Shaun, Mick), and one daughter Mairead. Both sons have played First Grade with Randwick. Berne died from complications of dementia on 13 July 2026, at the age of 72.
