= Eddie Stapleton =

- Born: 21 November 1930 Sydney
- Died: 13 November 2005 (aged 74) Sydney
- Height: 1.83 m (6 ft 0 in)
- Weight: 80 kg (180 lb)

Rugby union career
- Position: Wing
International career
Years	Team	Apps	(Points)
1951–1958	Australia	16	(25)
1960	New Zealand	1	(3)

Edgar Thomas (Eddie) Stapleton, (21 November 1930 – 13 November 2005) was an outstanding Australian Rugby union winger who made his mark with the Wallabies and the St George Rugby Club in Sydney in the 1950s. He was a curiosity in that he played a match for the New Zealand All Blacks in 1960.

Stapleton was a strong bulky winger and he played 16 test matches for Australia between 1951 and 1958, touring New Zealand with the Wallabies in 1952, 1955 and 1958. He played many games for the NSW Waratahs and was outstanding in Sydney club rugby, playing a record 236 games for St George and scoring 144 tries. He was captain when St George won the premiership in 1957, and he retired from the Wallabies the following season.

In 1960, the All Blacks stopped in Australia for warmup matches on their way to a tour of South Africa. Depleted by injuries, the All Blacks were short of players for the match against Queensland and Stapleton was invited to don the black jersey. He did so to become the 613th player to be selected as an All Black. He had lost none of his dash and repaid the selector's confidence in him by scoring the first try for the All Blacks who easily won the match.

Another Australian, Maurice Graham, of NSW, also played in that match, at fullback
