= Mick Freney =

Australian rugby union international

- Full name: Michael Ernest Freney
- Born: 10 May 1948 (age 78) Brisbane, Australia

Rugby union career
- Position: Hooker
International career
Years	Team	Apps	(Points)
1972–73	Australia	6	(0)

Michael Ernest Freney (born 10 May 1948) is an Australian former rugby union international.

Freney was born in Brisbane and educated at Nudgee College.

A hooker, Freney played for Brisbane club Brothers and made his state debut in 1970. A strong performance for Queensland against New South Wales Country in 1972 won him a Wallabies call up for that year's tour of New Zealand, where he featured in all three Tests. He gained further caps on the 1973 tour of Europe.

== See also ==
- List of Australia national rugby union players
