= John Taylor (rugby union, born 1949) =

Australian rugby union player (1949–2019)

- Born: John Inglis Taylor; 21 May 1949 Wollongong, New South Wales
- Died: 16 November 2019 (aged 70)
- School: Hurlstone Agricultural High School
- University: Sydney University

Rugby union career
- Position: wing
International career
Years	Team	Apps	(Points)
1971–72	Australia	4	(4)

John Inglis Taylor (21 May 1949 – 16 November 2019) was a rugby union player who represented Australia.

Taylor, a wing, was born in Wollongong, New South Wales and claimed a total of 4 international rugby caps for Australia.
