= Mick Clifford (rugby union) =

Australia international rugby union player (1916–1942)

- Full name: Michael Clifford
- Born: 28 April 1916 Forbes, NSW, Australia
- Died: 9 October 1942 (aged 26) off Terrigal, NSW, Australia

Rugby union career
- Position: Fullback
International career
Years	Team	Apps	(Points)
1938	Australia	1	(0)

Michael Clifford (28 April 1916 — 9 October 1942) was an Australian rugby union international.

Clifford was born in Forbes and attended Bathurst's St Stanislaus' College.

A goal-kicking fullback, Clifford played first-grade for St. George and was capped once for the Wallabies, against the All Blacks at the Sydney Cricket Ground in 1938. He was on the abandoned 1939–40 tour of Britain and Ireland with the Wallabies. After a 100-point season with St. George in 1940, Clifford enlisted in the Royal Australian Air Force.

Clifford, who reached the rank of flight sergeant, was a Spitfire pilot with a Royal Air Force squadron during the war. Back in Australia in 1942, he was killed in a training accident, while flying over Broken Bay near Terrigal.

== See also ==
- List of Australia national rugby union players
