= John Lambie (rugby union) =

Australian rugby union international

- Full name: John Kenneth Lambie
- Born: 27 March 1951 (age 75) Sydney, Australia
- Height: 6 ft 3 in (191 cm)

Rugby union career
- Position: Flanker / No. 8
International career
Years	Team	Apps	(Points)
1974–75	Australia	4	(0)

John Kenneth Lambie (born 27 March 1951) is an Australian former rugby union international.

Lambie was born in Sydney and attended Port Hacking High School in the city's south.

A fiery back-row forward, Lambie played his early rugby with Wollongong Teachers College and after performing well for New South Wales Country in 1974 was selected by the Wallabies for a home series against the All Blacks, where he featured in all three Tests. His fourth and final cap came against Wales in Cardiff on the 1975–76 tour of Britain and Ireland.

== See also ==
- List of Australia national rugby union players
