= Stuart Macdougall =

- Born: Stuart Grant Macdougall; 1 June 1947 (age 79) Sydney, Australia
- School: Newington College
- Notable relative: Graeme Macdougall (brother)

Rugby union career
- Position: Prop
International career
Years	Team	Apps	(Points)
1971–1976	Australia	8	

Stuart Grant Macdougall (born 1 June 1947) is a former Australian Rugby Union player who represented for the Wallabies eight times.

== Early life ==
Macdougall was born in Sydney and attended Newington College (1955–1966). He played his early club rugby with St George.

== Representative career ==
At the age of twenty-three, MacDougall was selected to represent New South Wales against Queensland. The following year he played in his first test match against South Africa against a back drop of anti-apartheid demonstrations. On this occasion he marked the Springbok captain Hannes Marais. He toured England in 1973–74 and played three tests against New Zealand in 1974. He played his three final tests against England, two at home in 1975 and once on the 1975-76 Australia rugby union tour of Britain and Ireland.

His brother Graeme was also an Australian rugby union representative player whose club career was played at St George.
