= Jake Howard =

- Born: John Leslie Patrick Howard; 30 August 1945 Bexley, New South Wales
- Died: 11 December 2015 (aged 70)
- School: St Joseph's College
- Notable relative: Cyril Towers

Rugby union career
- Position: Prop
International career
Years	Team	Apps	(Points)
1970–1973	Australia	7	(0)

John Leslie Patrick "Jake" Howard (30 August 1945 – 11 December 2015) was an international rugby footballer who played prop for Australia.

Howard was schooled at St. Joseph's College, Hunters Hill from 1957 and enjoyed enormous schoolboy sporting success playing in the college's 1st XV in four consecutive years 1960–63 and rowing in the 1st VIII for three years. He played his club rugby at Sydney University and took up rowing at the senior level with the Sydney Rowing Club. He stroked a junior VIII for the club in 1964 and stroked a coxed pair to a state championship in the 1964/65 season.

Howard made his international rugby debut on 6 June 1970 against Scotland and went on to make six further international representative appearances between 1970 and 1973. His final Test appearance was on the 1973 tour of Wales and England.

He coached rugby at the Sydney University club, at the University of Queensland's rugby club and in assisting roles with the 1991 and 1992 Wallabies focussing on scrum play emphasising the power of the front-row.

His wife Margariete was the daughter of Wallaby Cyril Towers. Their son Pat Howard (born 1973) played centre and fly-half for the Wallabies from 1993 to 1997. Margariete Howard was thus the daughter, wife and mother of a Wallaby.

Jake Howard died on 11 December 2015 at the age of 70.

== Published sources ==
- Howell, Max (2006) Born to Lead – Wallaby Test Captains (2005) Celebrity Books, New Zealand
