= Jim Hindmarsh =

Australia international rugby union & league footballer

Personal information
- Full name: James Charles Hindmarsh
- Born: 11 April 1952 (age 74) Bowral, New South Wales

Playing information

Rugby union
- Position: Fullback
Representative
Years	Team	Pld	T	G	FG	P
1975–76	Wallabies	9				12

Rugby league
- Position: Fullback
Club
Years	Team	Pld	T	G	FG	P
1977–78	Penrith	13	0	24	0	48
- As of 13 Jul 2021
- Education: The Scots College
- Relatives: Ian Hindmarsh (nephew); Nathan Hindmarsh (nephew)

James Charles Hindmarsh (born 11 April 1952) was a rugby union player who represented Australia, then latterly played the 1977–78 season rugby league for Penrith.

Hindmarsh, a fullback, was born in Bowral, New South Wales and schooled at The Scots College in Sydney. He claimed a total of 9 international rugby caps for Australia.

After that he played reserve grade in the NSWRFL Premiership for the Penrith Panthers club.

== Bibliography ==
- Howell, Max (2005) Born to Lead - Wallaby Test Captains, Celebrity Books, Auckland NZ
