= Bill McKid =

Australian rugby union international

- Full name: William Alexander McKid
- Born: 27 January 1953 (age 73) Barraba, NSW, Australia

Rugby union career
- Position: Centre
International career
Years	Team	Apps	(Points)
1976–79	Australia	6	(0)

William Alexander McKid (born 27 January 1953) is an Australian former rugby union international.

A native of Barraba in country New South Wales, McKid boarded at Scots College, Sydney and was a product of Mosman Juniors. He played senior rugby back in Barraba and made his New South Wales Country debut in 1974–75.

McKid, an outside centre, was capped six times for the Wallabies, debuting against England at Twickenham in 1976. He featured in two internationals on the 1978 tour of New Zealand, including a win in the 3rd Test at Eden Park.

== See also ==
- List of Australia national rugby union players
