= Mike Lampkowski =

England international rugby union & league footballer

Personal information
- Full name: Michael Stanley Lampkowski
- Born: 4 January 1953 (age 73) Scunthorpe, England

Playing information

Rugby union
- Position: Scrum-half
Club
Years	Team	Pld	T	G	FG	P
≤1977–≤77	Headingley
Representative
Years	Team	Pld	T	G	FG	P
≤1976	England	4	1	0	0	4

Rugby league
- Position: Scrum-half
Club
Years	Team	Pld	T	G	FG	P
1977–85	Wakefield Trinity	162	46	0	0	138

Michael Stanley Lampkowski (born 4 January 1953) is an English former rugby union, and professional rugby league footballer who played in the 1970s and 1980s. He played representative level rugby union (RU) for England, and at club level for Headingley, as a scrum-half, and club level rugby league (RL) for Wakefield Trinity, as a scrum-half.

== Background ==
Mike Lampkowski was born in Scunthorpe, Lincolnshire, England.

== Playing career ==
=== International honours ===
Mike Lampkowski made his international rugby union début, and scored a try in England's 23–6 victory over Australia at Twickenham, London on 3 January 1976. see List of England national rugby union team - Results 1976. He played three further rugby union internationals, in the 1976 Five Nations Championship against Wales, Scotland and Ireland.

== Rugby League career (Wakefield) ==
Lampkowski signed for Wakefield in February 1977 from the Headingley club, making a try-scoring début at Wigan on 20 February 1977, coming off the substitutes bench. He made a further ten appearances that season scoring four more tries, cementing the scrum half's shirt by season's end. The following season he made 29 appearances and finished Trinity's top try scorer with thirteen tries, partnering David Topliss at halfback for most of the season. His tries included braces against Workington, Dewsbury and Wigan. Trinity still had the experienced Terry Hudson on their books and occasionally Lampkowski moved to stand off in the occasional absence of Topliss. The following season saw a Wembley appearance and another 28 appearances and 1979-80 saw another fine season, partnering Topliss, with 'Toppo's sublime skills complementing Lampkowski's strong, powerful style perfectly. This season also saw his one and only try hat trick, against Hull KR in the Yorkshire Cup in the first match of the season. The last three games of the 1979-80 saw him move into the forwards and he cemented the loose forward position the following season with Topliss now partnering Allan Agar in the halfbacks. Trinity had their best season in years, finishing fourth in the league table. Injuries now started to catch up with him and his knee kept him out of many games over the next few years, missing the whole of the 1983–84 season. He eventually retired because of injury playing his last game at Salford on 24 March 1985. His eight-year Trinity career saw him play 162 games, scoring 46 tries, during his time at Wakefield Trinity he scored forty-five 3-point tries and one 4-point try.

=== 1979 Challenge Cup Final ===
Mike Lampkowski was part of the Trinity side that reached the RL Challenge Cup Final at Wembley in 1979, he appeared in all the four rounds leading up to the final; Featherstone, Oldham, Barrow and a 9–7 victory over St.Helens, at Headingley, in the semi-final. Lampkowski played scrum-half in Wakefield Trinity's 3–12 defeat by Widnes in the 1979 Challenge Cup Final during the 1978–79 season at Wembley Stadium on Saturday 5 May 1979, in front of a crowd of a crowd of 94,218.

== Medical procedures ==
Mike Lampkowski was recognised as one of the hardest and bravest players ever to don a Trinity shirt and, after an accident, was one of the first players to undergo surgery to replace his knee ligament with a dacron-fibre ligament. The technique was developed in Japan by Dr. Keiō, who came to Harrogate to perform the operation on Lampkowski after being referred by the club specialist Mr. John Anderson, who was based at Middlesbrough General Hospital and who had already performed the operation on another Trinity player with success. Dr. Graeme Garden - a.k.a. one of 'The Goodies' - presented a series of programmes on new medical techniques and Lampkowski was one of his guests and discussed the procedure on BBC Television. Without the operation it was almost certain that Lampkowski's playing career would have ended, but he came back and played again. Since that time, a number of other players of various sports have used the fibre ligament on troublesome shoulders where the original tissue stretches too much and often springs the shoulder bone out of its socket.
