= Mike Knill =

- Full name: Franklyn Michael David Knill
- Born: 22 December 1941 (age 84) Monkton, Pembrokeshire, Wales

Rugby union career
- Position: Prop
International career
Years	Team	Apps	(Points)
1976	Wales	1	(0)

Franklyn Michael David Knill (born 22 December 1941) is a Welsh former rugby union international.

Knill was born in Monkton, Pembrokeshire, and attended Pembroke Grammar School.

A tighthead prop, Knill was regarded as one of the best scrummagers in the country. He played much of his rugby with Cardiff and was capped once for the national team, as a substitute for Graham Price in a win over France in the 1976 Five Nations, which secured the grand slam for Wales. After leaving Cardiff, he served as captain of Penarth.

Knill, now retired, was a Detective Sergeant with South Wales Police.

== See also ==
- List of Wales national rugby union players
