= Keith Besomo =

- Born: Keith Scott Besomo; 8 June 1953 Sydney

Rugby union career
- Position: lock
International career
Years	Team	Apps	(Points)
1979	Wallabies	1	(0)

Keith Scott Besomo (born 8 June 1953) was a rugby union player who represented Australia.

Besomo, a lock, was born deaf in Sydney and claimed 1 international rugby cap for Australia. He later in 2010 traveled by pushbike from Perth to Sydney, Australia.
