= Peter Sullivan (rugby, born 1948) =

Australia international rugby union player

- Born: Peter David Sullivan; 19 March 1948 (age 78) Newcastle, NSW, Australia
- School: Chatswood Boys High

Rugby union career
- Position: Flanker
Amateur team(s)
Years	Team	Apps	(Points)
- Forest Rugby Club
Senior career
Years	Team	Apps	(Points)
- Gordon RFC
Provincial / State sides
Years	Team	Apps	(Points)
1966–73	New South Wales	18	
International career
Years	Team	Apps	(Points)
1971–1973	Australia	13	(4)
- Rugby league career

Playing information
- Position: Second-row
Club
Years	Team	Pld	T	G	FG	P
1974	St George Dragons	1	0	0	0	0

Peter David Sullivan (born 1948) is an Australian former national representative rugby union player. He represented for New South Wales and Australia, captaining the national side on eleven occasions from 1972 to 1973.

== Early life and rugby ==
Sullivan was schooled at Chatswood Boys High School and played his early rugby at the Forest Rugby Club in Forestville. His senior rugby started in Wollongong and in his first season of first grade and scarcely eighteen he was selected for the Illawarra region and from there he was selected for New South Wales after just six senior games. Howell writes that following state selection at such a young age, he found himself a marked man at club level and "injuries followed, his form deteriorated and his confidence with it" He did not represent again until 1970. In the mid 1970s he coached and was Physical Education teacher at Glenwood Boys High School in Durban South Africa.

== Representative career ==
In 1969 Sullivan relocated to Sydney and joined the Gordon Rugby Club. He spent some time in reserve grade in that first season in Sydney first grade but in 1970 he regained his state position in a match against Scotland and he represented for Sydney against those same visitors.

In 1971 Sullivan appeared for New South Wales against the visiting British Lions and later that year when South Africa also toured, Sullivan was selected to meet them for Sydney, New South Wales and in three Test matches for Australia. He made the 1971 Australia rugby union tour of France and played in both Test matches, experiencing his first Wallaby victory in the first Test.

In 1972 he played in both home Test matches against the visiting French and he toured under captain Greg Davis on the 1972 Australia rugby union tour of New Zealand and Fiji. He was injured and had to be replaced in the games against North Otago and in the first Test match. Howell writes that the seven loss & five win result of the tour was "a disaster and occasioned Davis' retirement". An injury picked up in New Zealand prevented Davis from leading the side in the Test match in Fiji on the way home and Sullivan debuted as an Australian Test captain in the Wallabies' narrow 21–19 victory against Fiji. He had already captained the side in two mid-week games during the New Zealand leg.

In 1973 Peter Sullivan retained the Test captaincy in the two Test series against Tonga and was at the helm in the 2nd Test boil-over when Tonga got up 16–11. Howell writes of this period as "the lowest ever point of Australian rugby". He led the Wallabies on the 1973 Australia rugby union tour of Europe, and played in six of the nine matches including the Test loss against Wales. He was injured and did not take the field in the test against England, where the Wallabies were captained by John Hipwell.

All told Sullivan captained the Wallabies in four Tests through 1972–1973 and in nine tour matches. He played twenty-eight matches for Australia, thirteen of them Tests. Howell writes that he was "a vigorous, aggressive player who played to the maximum when wearing the green and gold".

== Rugby league career ==
Keen to secure his family's financial future Sullivan signed a five-year contract with the St George Dragons at the end of the 1973 season. He managed only one first grade game before a serious knee injury ended his playing days.

== Career summary ==
=== Test matches ===
Playing for Australia

National Team	Y	M	S	P	T	W	L	D
Fiji	1972	1	1	4	1	1	0	0
France	1971–1972	4	4	0	0	1	2	1
New Zealand	1972	2	2	0	0	0	2	0
South Africa	1971	3	3	0	0	0	3	0
Tonga	1973	2	2	0	0	1	1	0
Wales	1973	1	1	0	0	0	0	1

Legend : Y : Year, M : Test Matches Played, S : Starts, P : Points, T : Tries, W : Won, L : Lost, D : Drawn

Preceded by Greg Davis	Australian national rugby union captain 1972–73	Succeeded by John Hipwell

== Published sources ==
- Howell, Max (2005) Born to Lead – Wallaby Test Captains, Celebrity Books, Auckland NZ
- Whiticker, Alan & Hudson, Glen (2006) The Encyclopedia of Rugby League Players, Gavin Allen Publishing, Sydney
