= David Hillhouse =

Australian rugby union international

- Full name: David William Hillhouse
- Born: 13 July 1955 (age 71) Brisbane, Australia

Rugby union career
- Position: Lock
International career
Years	Team	Apps	(Points)
1975–83	Australia	16	(0)

David William Hillhouse (born 13 July 1955) is an Australian former rugby union international.

Born in Brisbane and educated at Anglican Church Grammar School, Hillhouse was a second-row forward, regarded as a line-out specialist due to his exceptional jumping skills. He played for Brisbane's GPS club.

Hillhouse, a pilot by profession, was capped 16 times for the Wallabies, making his debut on the 1975–76 tour of Britain as a number eight, but otherwise spending his international career as a lock. His job kept him away from representative rugby between 1979 and 1982. An arrangement with his employer Ansett allowed him to play international rugby again 1983 and after featuring in seven Tests that year he announced his retirement.

== See also ==
- List of Australia national rugby union players
