= John Ryan (rugby, born 1948) =

Australia international rugby union & league footballer

Personal information
- Full name: John Robert Ryan
- Born: 29 December 1948 Wahroonga, New South Wales, Australia
- Died: 2 May 1982 (aged 33) Sydney, New South Wales, Australia

Playing information

Rugby union
- Position: Wing
Representative
Years	Team	Pld	T	G	FG	P
1975–76	Wallabies	6	9			36

Rugby league
- Position: Wing
Club
Years	Team	Pld	T	G	FG	P
1977–80	Penrith	55	14	1	0	44
- As of 13 Jul 2021

John Robert Ryan (29 December 1948 – 2 May 1982) was an Australian rugby union and professional rugby league footballer who played in the 1970s and 1980s. He played representative level rugby union (RU) for Australia and club level rugby league (RL) for the Penrith Panthers.

Ryan, a wing, was born in Wahroonga, New South Wales and claimed a total of 6 international rugby caps for Australia. He scored nine tries for Australia, and scored at least one try in every rugby union international.

He subsequently turned professional as a rugby league footballer with Penrith Panthers, but died at his home of a heart attack in 1982.
