= Chris Handy =

Australia international rugby union player

- Born: Christopher Bernard Handy; 28 March 1950 (age 76)

Rugby union career
- Position: Prop
Amateur team(s)
Years	Team	Apps	(Points)
- Brothers Old Boys
Provincial / State sides
Years	Team	Apps	(Points)
- Queensland
International career
Years	Team	Apps	(Points)
1978-80	Australia	6	

Chris Handy (born 28 March 1950) is a former rugby union football player, having played prop for both the Australia and Queensland. He played six internationals for Australia between 1978 and 1980.

Handy was educated at St Joseph's College, Gregory Terrace in Brisbane where he played in the school first XV. After he left school he played his club rugby for Brothers Old Boys.

After his playing career finished Handy worked as a publican as well as a rugby union colour commentator and analyst for various television networks.
