= Martin Knight (rugby union) =

- Born: 8 May 1955 Cheshire, England
- Died: 25 February 1984 (aged 28) Sydney, Australia

Rugby union career
- Position: Inside centre
International career
Years	Team	Apps	(Points)
1978	Australia	3	(0)

Martin Knight (8 May 1955 — 25 February 1984) was an Australian rugby union international.

Born in Cheshire, England, but raised in Sydney, Knight was an inside centre, strong in both attack and defence. He came through the juniors at Parramatta and was a member of the club's 1977 first-grade premiership team, scoring a try in the grand final success over Randwick. His three Wallabies caps all came in 1978, two Tests against Wales at home and then a Bledisloe Cup match in Wellington. He never received state representative honours.

Knight was diagnosed with leukaemia in 1979 and died of the illness five years later at Westmead Hospital, aged 28.

== See also ==
- List of Australia national rugby union players
