= Mark Keyworth =

England international rugby union footballer

- Born: 19 February 1948 Bridgnorth, Shropshire, England
- Died: 23 November 2014 (aged 66) Cardigan, Ceredigion, West Wales
- Height: 1.85 m (6 ft 1 in)
- Weight: 89 kg (14 st 0 lb)

Rugby union career
- Position: Flanker
Senior career
Years	Team	Apps	(Points)
1972-1981	Swansea	259	(185)
–	Aberystwyth		
International career
Years	Team	Apps	(Points)
1976	England	4	

Mark Keyworth (19 February 1948 – 23 November 2014) was an English rugby union player who played for Swansea, Aberystwyth, the North Midlands county team, and the national team.

Mark was educated at Ellesmere College, Shropshire for whom he played rugby. Mark also played rugby for Cirencester Agricultural College whilst completing his farming education there.
