= Philip Crowe (rugby union) =

Australian cricketer, rugby union international, surgeon

- Born: Philip John Crowe; 27 October 1955 Westminster, London, England
- Occupation: Surgeon

Rugby union career
- Position: Wing
Amateur team(s)
Years	Team	Apps	(Points)
1975–1980	Sydney University FC		
1981–1983	Oxford University RFC		
International career
Years	Team	Apps	(Points)
1976–1979	Australia	6	(8)

Official website
- ESPNscrum

Philip John Crowe (born 27 October 1955) is an English-born Australian surgical oncologist, and a former first-class cricketer and rugby union international.

Crowe was born at Westminster in October 1955 and moved to Australia as a child. He was educated at The Scots College, before going up to the University of Sydney where he studied at the Sydney Medical School. He played rugby union for Sydney University Football Club, coached by Jack Potts, debuting in 1975 as a wing. Having not played for either the New South Wales Waratahs or Sydney representative teams, Crowe was selected to tour France and Italy with Australia in 1976, making his Test match debut against France at Paris. He played five further Test's for Australia, with his final appearance coming against Argentina at Buenos Aires. His career highlight was scoring the winning try against Wales in 1978, while his career low was breaking an ankle in a club match in the same which ruled him out of the tour to New Zealand.

He went up to University College at the University of Oxford as a Rhodes Scholar in 1980, where he played rugby for Oxford University RFC from 1981–83, winning blues in each year. In addition to playing rugby at Oxford, Crowe also made a single appearance in first-class cricket for Oxford University against Gloucestershire at Oxford in 1982. He batted twice in the match, being dismissed for 11 runs in the Oxford first innings by Christopher Trembath, while in their second innings he was dismissed without scoring by David Surridge. With his left-arm medium pace, he took the wicket of Paul Romaines in the Gloucestershire first innings, finishing with match bowling figures of 1 for 121.

Following his rugby career, Crowe became a surgical oncologist. He is a professor at the Prince of Wales Clinical School, which he is also head of.
