= John Coolican =

Australian rugby union international

- Full name: John Edward Francis Coolican
- Born: 27 September 1953 (age 73) Sydney, Australia

Rugby union career
- Position: Prop
International career
Years	Team	Apps	(Points)
1982–83	Australia	4	(0)

John Edward Francis Coolican AM (born 27 September 1953) is an Australian former rugby union international.

Coolican was born in Sydney but raised in Bourke and boarded at Saint Ignatius' College, Riverview.

A loosehead prop, Coolican gained four Wallabies caps during the early 1980s. His first cap came in Christchurch on the 1982 tour of New Zealand, forming a front row with two other debutants, Andy McIntyre and Bruce Malouf. He received a further three caps on the 1983 tour of Italy and France.

Coolican, an orthodontist by profession, is a former President of the NSWRU. He was made a Member of the Order of Australia in the 2021 Queen's Birthday Honours list for services to orthodontics and rugby union.

== See also ==
- List of Australia national rugby union players
