= Bob Wilkinson (rugby union) =

English rugby union player (1951–2021)

- Full name: Robert Michael Wilkinson
- Born: 25 July 1951 Luton, Bedfordshire, England
- Died: 1 February 2021 (aged 69) Haynes, Bedfordshire, England
- School: St Albans School
- University: University of Cambridge

Rugby union career
- Position: Lock
Senior career
Years	Team	Apps	(Points)
1969–1985	Bedford	311	(148)
1972–1984	Barbarians	19	(12)
International career
Years	Team	Apps	(Points)
1975–1976	England	6	(0)

Robert Michael Wilkinson (25 July 1951 – 1 February 2021) was an English rugby union player who played as a lock. Born in Luton, he attended St Albans School and the University of Cambridge, where he earned three Blues between 1971 and 1973. He played his club rugby for Bedford RFC, for whom he made more than 311 appearances in a 16-year career; he made his debut as a 17-year-old in 1969, and made his final appearance in 1985. He captained Bedford from 1976 to 1979. He also made 19 appearances for the Barbarians between 1972 and 1984, including the famous victory over New Zealand in Cardiff in 1973, scoring three tries; he served as captain for the Barbarians for matches against Cardiff RFC and Newport RFC on their Easter tour to South Wales in 1979. He earned six caps for England between May 1975 and March 1976.

Wilkinson died on 1 February 2021 after a short illness. He was survived by his wife Sally and their four sons.
