= John Cantrell =

Irish rugby union player

- Full name: John Leo Cantrell
- Born: 10 January 1954 (age 72) Limerick, Ireland

Rugby union career
- Position: Hooker
International career
| Years | Team | Apps | (Points) |
| 1976–81 | Ireland | 9 | (0) |

John Leo Cantrell (born 10 January 1954) is an Irish former rugby union international.

Cantrell was born in Limerick and attended Dublin's Blackrock College.

A hooker, Cantrell played for University College Dublin and was capped nine times for Ireland from 1976 to 1981. He was part of international tours of New Zealand and South Africa during his career, which was ended by back injuries.

Cantrell is an architect by profession.

== See also ==
- List of Ireland national rugby union players
