= Martin Cooper (rugby union) =

England international rugby union player

Martin Cooper (born 23 April 1948 (age 78)) was an England international rugby union player who won 11 caps between 1973 and 1977. A versatile player, he played International rugby at flyhalf and centre and first class rugby at full back and wing where he scored a try against the All Blacks at Moseley for the Midlands Counties West when they defeated them. His only international try was scored against Ireland at Lansdowne Road, the only score in a 4–0 victory.

Martin Cooper began his career at Wolverhampton before moving to Moseley. He soon was called up to the England squad and won his first cap in 1973. In the same year he played for England against New Zealand in Auckland, 16–10, the first home country national side to beat them in NZ. Martin Johnsons side was the second.

He later captained Moseley for three years including a John Player Cup against Leicester. His last game was in another John Player Final (shared with Gloucester) in 1982. He retired that year.

Cooper is an Independent Financial Adviser with his own company, based in Worcester.
