= Peter Squires (sportsman) =

English cricketer and rugby union player (1951–2026)

Peter John Squires (4 August 1951 – 21 January 2026) was an English rugby union player and a first-class cricketer, who played in 49 first-class matches for Yorkshire County Cricket Club between 1972 and 1976.

== Biography ==
Squires was born in Ripon, Yorkshire, England on 4 August 1951. He was educated at both Ripon Grammar School and York St John University. A right-handed opening batsman he scored 1,271 first-class runs at an average of 16.72, with a best score of 70. In his 56 List A one day matches from 1971 to 1976, he accumulated 708 runs at 16.46 with a top score of 79 not out. The only ball he bowled in one day cricket went to the boundary, and his 6.2 overs in first-class cricket cost 32 runs without success. Squires took 14 first-class catches. He played club cricket for Manningham Mills C.C.as well as for Harrogate C.C.

He was better known for his rugby union exploits, playing on the wing for Ripon RUFC and Harrogate RUFC and twenty nine times for England in the 1970s, scoring six tries, as well as playing for the British and Irish Lions on the 1977 British Lions tour to New Zealand. He continued to play for Ripon into his early forties. He played in England's 23-6 victory over Australia at Twickenham in January 1976.

Squires also worked at Harrogate Grammar School as games teacher, coaching the senior boys primarily in rugby union, but also in other sports such as cricket, hockey and athletics.

Squires died on 21 January 2026, at the age of 74.

== See also ==
- List of English cricket and rugby union players
