= David L'Estrange =

Australian rugby union international

- Full name: Rex David L'Estrange
- Born: 25 May 1948 (age 78) Brisbane, Australia

Rugby union career
- Position: Centre
International career
Years	Team	Apps	(Points)
1971–76	Australia	16	(8)

Rex David L'Estrange (born 25 May 1948) is an Australian former rugby union international.

L'Estrange is a native of Brisbane, where he attended Marist College Ashgrove. He was a fullback on the school's 1st XV and later played rugby for Brothers Old Boys, before making his Queensland debut in 1968.

Having moved to centre for Queensland in 1970, L'Estrange gained 16 caps for the Wallabies in that position from 1971 to 1976. He scored two tries on his Test debut against France at Toulouse and in 1973 captained the Wallabies in a tour match against an Italian XV. His final international appearances came on the 1975–76 tour of Britain and the U.S.

== See also ==
- List of Australia national rugby union players
