= Garrick Fay =

Australia international rugby union player

- Born: Garrick Fay; 11 April 1948 (age 78) Sydney, Australia, New South Wales
- Height: 196.85 cm (6 ft 5.50 in)
- Weight: 114 kg (17 st 13 lb)
- School: Shore, North Sydney

Rugby union career
- Position: Lock (Second Row)
Amateur team(s)
Years	Team	Apps	(Points)
1968-1981	Northern Suburbs Rugby Club		
1970	Wasps RFC		
1970-1971	James Bay Athletic Association		
–	Northern Suburbs Rugby Club		
Provincial / State sides
Years	Team	Apps	(Points)
1970	Middlesex		
1971 - 1979	Sydney	49	
1971 - 1979	NSW	19	
International career
Years	Team	Apps	(Points)
1971-1979	Australia	24	(7)

Garrick Fay (born 11 April 1948 in Sydney, Australia) is an Australian businessman and former international rugby player. Garrick was a member of the Australian national team from 1971 to 1979.

== International rugby career ==
Garrick Fay began his international rugby career with the Australian Wallabies in 1971 with his first game against the South African Springboks. He was invited to play in a number of teams including the Scottish Rugby Union Centenary in 1973, and the Irish Rugby Union Centenary in 1974. He was selected as captain of the Rugby World XV side in the centenary celebrations for Cardiff Rugby Club in 1977 and was selected in a world XV to play in South Africa in 1978.

=== Australia ===
Garrick's first cap for Australia was on 31 July 1971 at the Brisbane Exhibition Ground against South Africa during their controversial tour of Australia. Due to the more experienced second row of the South African side, Fay was dropped for subsequent games and rejoined the squad for the Wallabies tour of New Zealand and Fiji in 1972.

Fay's golden years, as with many other players competing for the Wallabies around this time, was during The Sixth Wallaby tour in 1975-76. Garrick played 17 tour matches, and 4 out of the 5 major test matches. He sustained an injury while playing against Wales and was rested during 1976. This meant missing out on two Fiji Tests and the end of season tour against France but returned for the home series against Wales. Performing solidly meant Fay received an invitation to the 1978 Australia rugby union tour of New Zealand where he played in 10 tour matches and scored 3 tries.

Fay made the decision to leave international rugby in 1979, but continued to play for Northern Suburbs Rugby Club. He also withdrew his availability for representative teams at the same time. This made his last game for the Wallabies against Ireland at Brisbane on 3 June 1979 where they lost 12–27.

== Amateur clubs ==
=== Time off ===
Garrick's only club was the Northern Suburbs Rugby Club in Sydney, New South Wales. He played in the second row between the years 1968 - 1981 with the exception of 1970-1971 when he took a year off to travel overseas. During this time he traveled to England where he played for Wasps RFC (Rugby Football Club) in London UK and from that club was picked for Middlesex County, to tour British Columbia. He stayed on and played for and captained, James Bay Athletic Association.

=== Provincial/State sides ===
Garrick lead Sydney and New South Wales as captain in 1977-78. Ironically leading Sydney to victory against Wales in 1978, beating them 18 - 16, only to be beaten while captaining the larger side of New South Wales 0-18 a few days later.
