= Barrie Corless =

England international rugby union player

- Full name: Barrie James Corless
- Born: 7 November 1945 (age 81) Booton, Norfolk, England

Rugby union career
- Position: Centre
International career
Years	Team	Apps	(Points)
1976–78	England	10	(4)

Barrie James Corless (born 7 November 1945) is an English former rugby union international.

Born in Booton, Norfolk, Corless is an old boy of Wymondham College.

Corless played his rugby in the West Midlands, starting his career with Birmingham RFC. He next played for Coventry and in 1976 was called up for England to play at centre against the touring Wallabies at Twickenham. England won the match and he had a second half try, chasing his own kick to score. In the weeks after the match he signed a contract with Moseley, as Coventry were unable to give him regular games as a centre, which is where he needed to be playing to push for further selection. He featured in all of England's matches in the 1977 and 1978 Five Nations.

Following a period of coaching for RFU Midlands, Corless came to Northampton as an administrator in 1988, a position which ultimately become coaching director. He helped the club rise from the bottom of League Two to earn League One promotion and make a Pilkington Cup final, before he left in 1993. A less successful stint followed as coaching director at Gloucester and he then returned to Moseley, to fill the same position.

== See also ==
- List of England national rugby union players
