= Dave Burnet =

Australian rugby union international

- Full name: David Ronald Burnet
- Born: 8 September 1950 (age 76) Sydney, Australia
- School: Knox Grammar School

Rugby union career
- Position: Centre
International career
Years	Team	Apps	(Points)
1972	Australia	6	(4)
- Rugby league career

Playing information
- Position: Centre
Club
Years	Team	Pld	T	G	FG	P
1974–75	North Sydney Bears	18				4

David Ronald Burnet (born 8 September 1950) is an Australian former rugby union international who represented Australia in six Test matches. He also played rugby league for the North Sydney Bears.

Burnet was born in Sydney and attended Knox Grammar School.

A Gordon first-grade player, Burnet was an outside centre and made all of his Wallabies appearances in 1972, debuting in a home series against France. He kept his place for the tour of New Zealand that followed and he played in all three Tests, then scored his only Wallabies try in a one-off Test against Fiji in Suva.

Burnet converted to rugby league in 1974, signing a one-year contract with Manly Warringah. He featured in two pre-season matches for Manly Warringah but then struggled to maintain a spot in the reserves and requested to be released from his contract. North Sydney subsequently signed Burnet and he made 11 first-grade appearances in the 1974 NSWRFL season, with coach Noel Kelly naming him the side's most improved player. He spent one further season at North Sydney, playing another seven first-grade games in 1975.

== See also ==
- List of Australia national rugby union players
