= Bruce Battishall =

Australia international rugby union player

- Born: Bruce Robert Battishall; 3 September 1946 Canterbury, New South Wales
- School: Hurstville Boys High School

Rugby union career
- Position: flanker
International career
Years	Team	Apps	(Points)
1973	Wallabies	1	(0)

Bruce Robert Battishall (born 3 September 1946) was a rugby union player who represented Australia.

Battishall, a flanker, was born in Canterbury, New South Wales and claimed 1 international rugby cap for Australia.
