= Ken Wright (rugby) =

Australian former rugby footballer (born 1956)

Personal information
- Born: 11 April 1956 (age 70) Malabar, New South Wales, Australia

Playing information
- Height: 171 cm (5 ft 7 in)
- Weight: 71 kg (11 st 3 lb)

Rugby union
Club
Years	Team	Pld	T	G	FG	P
1974–78	Randwick
Representative
Years	Team	Pld	T	G	FG	P
1975–78	Australia	9

Rugby league
- Position: Centre, Five-eighth
Club
Years	Team	Pld	T	G	FG	P
1979–81	Eastern Suburbs	22	6	36	0	90
1982–83	South Sydney	36	6	5	11	41
	Total	58	12	41	11	131

Ken Wright (born 11 April 1956 in Malabar, New South Wales) is an Australian former dual code rugby footballer who played in the 1970s and 1980s.

== Rugby union career ==
He started his football career in rugby union at the Randwick club in 1974. A pivotal moment in his representative career came in 1975 when, representing Sydney against the touring international team, he appeared to sidestep the entire opposition forward pack to score a try.

He was selected to represent Australia in 1975 and went on to play nine international tests.

== Rugby league career ==
Wright's rugby union career lasted until the end of 1978 when, in 1979, he converted to rugby league and joined Eastern Suburbs and later South Sydney in the New South Wales Rugby League premiership competitions.
