= Steve Finnane =

Australian rugby union player

- Born: Stephen Charles Finnane; 3 July 1952 (age 74) Sydney
- School: Waverley College & Vaucluse High School

Rugby union career
- Position: prop
Senior career
| Years | Team | Apps | (Points) |
- Eastern Suburbs
International career
| Years | Team | Apps | (Points) |
| 1975–78 | Wallabies | 6 | (0) |

Stephen Charles "Steve" Finnane (born 3 July 1952) was a rugby union player who represented Australia.

Finnane, a prop, was born in Sydney and claimed a total of six international rugby caps for Australia. He was dubbed the phantom puncher, for a short right uppercut delivered to Welsh player Graham Price in a scrum during the second Test match between the Wallabies and Wales at the SCG on 17 June 1978. The Welshman suffered a shattered jaw. The Wallaby later wrote in a book that he hit Price.

The Wales match proved to be Finnane's last for Australia: although he was selected for the 1979 tour of New Zealand, he declined, choosing to focus on his professional career as a barrister. Finnane was admitted as a Barrister in the Supreme court on 6 June 1975. He is the brother of District Court judge Michael Finnane who died in 2019 KC
