= Chris Carberry =

Australia international rugby union player

- Born: Christopher Michael Carberry; 27 April 1951 (age 75) Gundagai, New South Wales
- School: St Joseph's College

Rugby union career
- Position: hooker
International career
Years	Team	Apps	(Points)
1973–82	Wallabies	13	(0)

Christopher Michael Carberry (born 27 April 1951) was a rugby union player who represented Australia.

Carberry, a hooker, was born in Sydney and claimed a total of 13 international rugby caps for Australia.

== Published sources ==
- Howell, Max (2006) Born to Lead – Wallaby Test Captains (2005) Celebrity Books, New Zealand
