= Reg Smith (rugby union) =

Australian rugby union international

- Full name: Reginald Allan Smith
- Born: 13 January 1948 (age 78) Wauchope, NSW, Australia

Rugby union career
- Position: Lock
International career
Years	Team	Apps	(Points)
1971–76	Australia	22	(4)

Reginald Allan Smith (born 13 January 1948) is an Australian former rugby union international.

Born in Wauchope, New South Wales, Smith is the son of a dairy farmer and became a rugby player during his time at Hawkesbury Agricultural College. He was a New South Wales Country representative in 1969 and the following year made his debut for the state team. After moving to Sydney in 1971, he began playing first-grade for Northern Suburbs.

Smith gained his first Wallabies call up against the 1971 touring Springboks, having impressed in a tour match for a Sydney representative side. Playing mostly as a lock, he was capped 22 times for the Wallabies between 1971 and 1976, which included a run of 14 consecutive Test matches. He was named vice captain for the 1975–76 tour of Britain and the United States and stood in as captain in the tour match against South West Counties at Exeter.

== See also ==
- List of Australia national rugby union players
