= Paddy Batch =

Australian rugby union international

- Full name: Patrick Gerard Batch
- Born: 19 January 1953 (age 73) Innisfail, QLD, Australia

Rugby union career
- Position: Wing
International career
Years	Team	Apps	(Points)
1975–79	Australia	14	(20)

Patrick Gerard Batch (born 19 January 1953) is an Australian former rugby union international.

Batch is a native of Innisfail in Far North Queensland and attended Marist College Ashgrove.

A winger, Batch was capped 14 times for the Wallabies, debuting on the 1975–76 tour of Britain, for which he had been a surprise selection. He also toured New Zealand in 1978 and scored a try against the All Blacks in Wellington.

Batch, a graduate of the University of Queensland, was a veterinarian by profession.

He is now a teacher at Brisbane Girls Grammar School.

== See also ==
- List of Australia national rugby union players
