= Gary Pearse =

Australian rugby union international

- Full name: Gary Keith Pearse
- Born: 8 February 1953 (age 73) Sydney, Australia

Rugby union career
- Position: Flanker
International career
Years	Team	Apps	(Points)
1975–78	Australia	9	(16)

Gary Keith Pearse (born 8 February 1953) is an Australian rugby union commentator and former international player.

Pearse was born in Sydney and educated at Maroubra Bay High School, during which time he played as a centre.

During the late 1970s, Pearse was capped nine times as a flanker for the Wallabies. On the 1975–76 tour of Britain and Ireland, he made his Test debut off the bench against Wales in Cardiff, then was the starting flanker in a win over Ireland at Lansdowne Road. He later returned to Europe to play rugby for Italian club Lazio and also played two seasons with Durban High School Old Boys. In his final Test appearance, against the All Blacks in 1978, he scored his fourth Wallabies try in a rare win at Eden Park. He captained the Wallabies twice that tour in uncapped matches.

Pearse is a former Chief Executive of New South Wales Rugby Union.

== See also ==
- List of Australia national rugby union players
