= Laurie Monaghan =

Australian rugby union international

- Full name: Laurence Edward Monaghan
- Born: 19 May 1951 (age 75) Randwick, Sydney, Australia

Rugby union career
- Position: Fullback / Wing
International career
Years	Team	Apps	(Points)
1973–79	Australia	17	(11)

Laurence Edward Monaghan (born 19 May 1951) is an Australian former rugby union international.

Monaghan, educated at East Hills Boys High School in Sydney, was a fullback and winger with a skilful kicking game.

Capped 17 times for the Wallabies during the 1970s, Monaghan made his debut on the wing against England at Twickenham in 1973. He was later a member of the 1975–76 tour of Britain, Ireland, where he featured in all four Tests against the home nations. On the 1978 Wales tour of Australia, he kicked a famous drop goal for Sydney, from 45-metres and near the sideline, which put them ahead with two minutes remaining.

== See also ==
- List of Australia national rugby union players
