= Ron Graham (rugby union) =

Australian rugby union player

- Full name: Ronald Graham
- Born: 21 December 1946 (age 79) Sydney, Australia

Rugby union career
- Position: Prop
International career
Years	Team	Apps	(Points)
1973–76	Australia	18	(0)

Ronald Graham AM (born 21 December 1946) is an Australian former rugby union player and administrator.

Graham was born and raised in Sydney, attending Kingsgrove North High School.

A product of Bexley Kingsgrove juniors, Graham was a prop and played first-grade for St. George. He broke into the Wallabies team in 1973 after the retirement of Roy Prosser and gained a total of 18 Test caps. His international career included the 1975–76 tour of Britain, where he had the distinction of captaining the Wallabies in a tour match.

Graham served as the chairman of Australian Rugby Union from 2005 to 2007. He was appointed a Member of the Order of Australia in the 2015 Queen's Birthday Honours list, for services to rugby union as an administrator.

== See also ==
- List of Australia national rugby union players
