= Peter Horton (rugby union) =

Australian rugby union player (1945–2026)

- Full name: Peter Alan Horton
- Born: 20 July 1945 Brixton, London, England
- Died: 22 October 2026 (aged 81) Berry, New South Wales, Australia

Rugby union career
- Position: Hooker
International career
Years	Team	Apps	(Points)
1974–79	Australia	19	(0)

Peter Alan Horton (20 July 1945 – 22 October 2026) was an English-born Australian rugby union international and sport historian.

== Biography ==
Born and raised in England, Horton was educated at Tulse Hill School and St Luke's College, Exeter. He was a hooker and played for London club Streatham-Croydon, representing Surrey at county level.

Horton moved to Australia at the age of 24 and worked as the Sportsmaster at Gateshead High School in Newcastle, New South Wales, where he played rugby with the Newcastle Waratahs club. Capped 19 times for the Wallabies from 1974 to 1979, Horton debuted against the All Blacks in Sydney and won a Bledisloe Cup title in his final year.

After his Test career, Horton completed a PhD at the University of Queensland related to the history of rugby union in Australia. After completing his PhD, he lectured at Queensland University of Technology, Griffith University, James Cook University and Nanyang Technological University, Singapore.

Horton died in Berry, New South Wales on 22 October 2026, at the age of 81.

== See also ==
- List of Australia national rugby union players
