= John Hipwell =

Australia international rugby union player

- Born: John Noel Brian Hipwell; 24 January 1948 Mayfield, New South Wales
- Died: 23 September 2013 (aged 65) Byron Bay, New South Wales
- School: Wallsend High School

Rugby union career
- Position: Scrum-half
Amateur team(s)
Years	Team	Apps	(Points)
- Armidale City Rugby Club
–	Waratah Rugby Newcastle		
Provincial / State sides
Years	Team	Apps	(Points)
1968–1981	New South Wales	27	
International career
Years	Team	Apps	(Points)
1968–1982	Australia	36	(14)

John Noel Brian Hipwell (24 January 1948 – 23 September 2013) was an Australian national representative rugby union player who played and captained the Wallabies. He played the majority of his career at scrum half and his representative career spanned 14 seasons from 1968 to 1981.

== Rugby career ==
Hipwell was a junior and then senior player for the Waratahs Rugby Club in Newcastle NSW where he received tutelage from past Wallaby Cyril Burke. Hipwell's first international game was for NSW Country against the touring British Lions in 1966. He was then selected for the 1966–67 Australia rugby union tour of Britain, Ireland and France although he made no test appearances on that tour. His first Test cap came in 1968 against New Zealand, when he replaced Ken Catchpole who suffered a career-ending injury.

He became a regular selection touring to the UK in 1968, South Africa in 1969, France in 1971 and Europe in 1973. In 1973 he was named as captain for the match against England at Twickenham in the absence of the injured tour captain, Peter Sullivan. Hipwell eventually captained Australia in nine Tests. He was the captain of the 1975–76 Australia rugby union tour of Britain and Ireland but a serious knee injury sustained in the match against North-East Counties recurred in the Test against Wales, forcing him off the field and keeping him out of international rugby for three years. In 1978 he returned, playing in three Tests against New Zealand. Hipwell's final international call-up came three years later, when he was selected for the 1981–82 Australia rugby union tour of Britain and Ireland and played in three of the four Test matches – in the game against England in January 1982 he played his final international game at 33 years of age.

== Accolades ==
He received the Order of Australia Medal in 1982. In 2006 he was honoured in the second set of inductees into the Australian Rugby Union Hall of Fame.

== International career ==
- International Debut: Saturday, 15 June 1968 v New Zealand (Sydney) lost 27–11 – (Aged: 20)
- Final Appearance: 02/01/1982 v England (Twickenham) lost 15–11 (Aged: 33)
- Wallaby Number: 519
- 36 Australian Caps: 1968–82 Played: 36, Won: 11, Drew: 2, Lost: 23. Test Points: 14. Tries: 4

== Later life ==
Hipwell taught at The Armidale School in the 1970s and 1980s and later taught at the Anglican Church Grammar School in Brisbane since 1990. He also coached junior-grade rugby. He died on 23 September 2013.

Preceded by Peter Sullivan	Australian national rugby union captain 1974–75	Succeeded by Geoff Shaw
