= Rod Hauser =

Australian rugby union player (born 1952)

- Born: Rodney Graham Hauser; 31 March 1952 Laidley, Queensland
- School: St Peter’s Lutheran College

Rugby union career
- Position: scrum-half
International career
Years	Team	Apps	(Points)
1973–79	Wallabies	17	(4)

Rodney Graham Hauser (born 31 March 1952) was a rugby union player who represented Australia.

Hauser, a scrum-half, was born in Laidley, Queensland and claimed a total of 17 international rugby caps for Australia.

During his playing career Hauser was also a Physical Education teacher at St Peters Lutheran College, Indooroopilly, Queensland.

Hauser was once quoted in a newspaper to be the best halfback in the world.
