= 1966–67 Australia rugby union tour of Britain, Ireland and France =

- Manager: Bill McLaughlin
- Tour captain: John Thornett
Summary
P	W	D	L
Total
36	19	3	14
Test match
5	2	0	3
Opponent
P	W	D	L
Wales
1	1	0	0
Scotland
1	0	0	1
England
1	1	0	0
Ireland
1	0	0	1
France
1	0	0	1

Between October 1966 and March 1967 the Australia national rugby union team – the Wallabies – conducted a world tour on which they played five Tests and thirty-one minor tour matches. Under the captaincy of John Thornett they toured UK, Ireland, France and Canada winning nineteen matches, losing fourteen and drawing three. At one stage they failed to win in four successive matches although in the Test match against England they gave the home side its heaviest defeat in 16 years. The tour marked the climax of the successful "Thornett Era" of Australian Rugby, buoyed by the leadership skills of skipper John Thornett and the outstanding abilities of greats of the game like Ken Catchpole, Peter Johnson and Rob Heming. Dick Marks and Peter Crittle also toured and would later become among the most influential administrators of Australian rugby.

== Leadership ==
Following their success on the 1963 Australia rugby union tour of South Africa, team managers Bill McLaughlin and Alan Roper, together with captain John Thornett and vice-captain Ken Catchpole again led the Wallaby tour squad. Manager Bill McLaughlin was a 1936 two Test cap Wallaby, who would later serve a term a President of the Australian Rugby Union. Alan Roper was the Assistant Manager, the traditional coaching role of the touring party. Roper had been a schoolboy coach at Riverview in Sydney in the 1950s but had coached at the top-level in Australia since at least 1962 having success with the 1963 Australia rugby union tour of South Africa and again against the Springboks in a two Test domestic series in 1965.

John Thornett an exceptional leader of men, was the squad captain. Thornett had at the tour's beginning already made 36 Test appearances for Australia, 15 as captain. He had been entrenched as Wallaby captain since 1962, leading the side more times than any player to that point in Australia's rugby history. He was making his eight Wallaby tour, his fourth as the team leader. With Thornett sidelined by illness early in the tour, the Wallabies were captained by half back Ken Catchpole in all but the French Test. Catchpole is considered Australia's greatest scrumhalf.

- Manager: Bill McLaughlin
- Assistant-Manager (Coach): Alan Roper
- Captain: John Thornett
- Vice-Captain: Ken Catchpole

== Players ==
31 players toured with the 5th Wallaby squad. The team set out with 30 players, however, hooker Ross Cullen was sent home after the third tour match and was replaced by Dick Taylor. The squad had three veterans of the 4th Wallaby Tour - fullback Jim Lenehan, forward Tony Miller and skipper John Thornett - and comprised the strong nucleus of players of the Thornett Era who had taken Australia to great heights, including scrumhalf Ken Catchpole, hooker Peter Johnson, lineout specialist Rob Heming and breakaways Jules Guerassimoff and Greg Davis. Young rising stars included John Brass and John Hipwell. A number of the players would continue on to influential roles in rugby administration, including centre Dick Marks and forward Peter Crittle.

== Early setbacks ==
After the Oxford University match – the 2nd match of the tour – Queensland hooker Ross Cullen was accused of biting the ear of Oxford front-rower Ollie Waldron. Waldron's ear needed treatment and McLaughlin acted to ban Cullen from the tour as punishment. Cullen was put on the next flight to Sydney and never played for his country again. The side was further rocked when skipper John Thornett contracted impetigo in a scrum, and dropped himself for the first Test.

== Matches of the tour ==
Scores and results list Australia's points tally first.

	Date	Opponent	Location	Result	Score
1	19 October	(England) North-Eastern Counties	Gosforth, Newcastle upon Tyne	Lost	14–17
2	22 October	(England) Midland Counties East	Welford Road, Leicester	Lost	9–17
3	26 October	(England) Oxford University RFC	Iffley Road, Oxford	Won	11–9
4	29 October	(Glamorgan) Neath & Aberavon	The Gnoll, Neath	Won	9–3
Match	2 November	(Monmouthshire (historic)) Ebbw Vale & Abertillery	Ebbw Vale	Won	25–6
Match	5 November	Cardiff	Cardiff Arms Park, Cardiff	Lost	8–14
Match	12 November	(England) London Counties	Twickenham Stadium, London	Lost	9–14
Match	16 November	(Scotland) Glasgow - Edinburgh	Hughenden Stadium, Glasgow	Won	18–11
Match	19 November	South of Scotland	Mansfield Park, Hawick	Lost	0–13
Match	23 November	(Newport, Wales) Newport	Rodney Parade, Newport	Drew	3–3
Match	26 November	(Glamorgan) Swansea	St Helens Ground, Swansea	Lost	8–9
Match	29 November	(Monmouthshire (historic)) Pontypool, Cross Keys & Newbridge	Pontypool Park, Pontypool	Lost	3–12
Test	3 December	Wales	Cardiff Arms Park	Won	14–11
Match	7 December	Leinster Rugby	Lansdowne Road, Dublin	Won	9–3
Match	13 December	(Scotland) The North	Linksfield Stadium, Aberdeen	Won	6–3
Test	17 December	Scotland	Murrayfield Stadium	Lost	5–11
Match	21 December	(England) North Western Counties	White City Stadium, Manchester	Lost	3–8
Match	31 December	(England) Southern Counties	Iffley Road, Oxford	Won	27–6
Match	3 January	(England) Cornwall & Devon	Camborne, Cornwall	Won	11–6
Test	7 January	England	Twickenham Stadium	Won	23–11
match	11 January	(England) Midland Counties West	Moseley, Birmingham	Lost	9–17
match	14 January	(England) Western Counties	Memorial Stadium, Bristol	Lost	0–9
Match	17 January	(Wales) Llanelli	Stradey Park, Llanelli	Lost	11–0
Test	21 January	Ireland	Lansdowne Road	Lost	8–15
Match	25 January	Munster	Musgrave Park, Cork	Lost	8–11
Match	28 January	Barbarians	Cardiff Arms Park, Cardiff	Won	17–11
Test	11 February	France	Stade de Columbes	Lost	14–20
Match	16 February	(Canada) University of B.C	Varsity Stadium, Vancouver	Won	11–6
Match	18 February	(Canada) British Columbia	Empire Stadium, Vancouver	Won	24–11

== Test matches ==
=== Wales ===
3 December 1966

Wales	11–14	Australia
(3 – 1t) Dawes (3 – 1t) Morgan (5 – 1pg, 1g) T Price		Cardy (3 – 1t); Lenehan (6 – 1t, 1pg); Hawthorne (5 – 1fg, 1g)

Cardiff Arms Park, Cardiff
Attendance: 50,000
Referee: KD Kelleher (IRFU)

AUSTRALIA: Jim Lenehan, Alan Cardy, Dick Marks, John Brass, Stewart Boyce, Phil Hawthorne, Ken Catchpole (c), Jim Miller, Peter Johnson, Tony Miller, Ross Teitzel, Rob Heming, Michael Purcell, Greg Davis, John O'Gorman.

WALES: Terry Price, Stuart Watkins, John Dawes, Gerald Davies, Dewi Bebb, Barry John, Allan Lewis, Denzil Williams, Norman Gale, John Lloyd, Brian Price, Delme Thomas, Ken Braddock, Haydn Morgan, Alun Pask (c).

=== Scotland ===
17 December 1966

Scotland	11–5	Australia
(3 – 1t) Boyle (3 – 1t) Chisolm (5 – 1pg, 1g) Wilson		Brass (3 – 1t); Lenehan (2 – 1g)

Murrayfield, Edinburgh
Attendance: 45,000
Referee: M Joseph (WRU)

AUSTRALIA: Jim Lenehan, Stewart Boyce, Dick Marks, John Brass, Alan Cardy, Paul Gibbs, Ken Catchpole (c), Jim Miller, Peter Johnson, Tony Miller, Ross Teitzel, Peter Crittle, Michael Purcell, Greg Davis, John O'Gorman.

SCOTLAND: Stewart Wilson, Sandy Hinshelwood, Jock Turner, Brian Simmers, David Whyte, David Chisholm, Alex Hastie, Norm Suddon, Frank Laidlaw, David Rollo, Peter Stagg, Peter Brown, James Fisher (c), Derrick Grant, Alasdair Boyle.

=== England ===
7 January 1967

England	11–23	Australia
(3 – 1t) Ashby (8 – 1g, 2pg) Hosen		Brass (3 – 1t); Catchpole (3 – 1t); Hawthorne (12 – 1pg, 3fg); Lenehan (5 – 1g,1pg)

Twickenham, London
Attendance: 60,000
Referee: KD Kelleher (IRFU)

The Test marked Australia's best performance of the tour. With their halves Phil Hawthorne and Ken Catchpole in control the Wallabies gave England its heaviest defeat in 16 years.

AUSTRALIA: Jim Lenehan, Alan Cardy, Dick Marks, John Brass, Stewart Boyce, Phil Hawthorne, Ken Catchpole (c), John O'Gorman, Jules Guerassimoff, Greg Davis, Ross Teitzel, Peter Crittle, Roy Prosser, Peter Johnson, Jim Miller

ENGLAND: Roger Hosen, Keith Savage, Colin McFadyean, Christopher Jennins, Peter Glover, Richard Sharp (c), Clive Ashby, Phil Judd, George Sherriff, Budge Rogers, Dick Greenwood, Peter Larter, Mike Davis, Steve Richards, Mike Coulman

=== Ireland ===
21 January 1967

Ireland	15–8	Australia
(3 – 1t) Duggan (3 – 1t) Duggan (3 – 1pg) Kiernan (6 – 2fg) Gibson		Boyce (3 – 1t); Lenehan (3 – 1g); Hawthorne (3 – 1fg)

Lansdowne Road, Dublin
Attendance: 54,000
Referee: M Joseph (WRU)

Ireland's first try was scored by Alan Duggan from a crossfield kick by Rea. A drop-goal followed by Ireland's Gibson from broken play deep in Australia's territory. Kiernan soon after kicked a penalty from out wide following an Australian infringement. Gibson followed with another drop-goal after a scrum close to the Australian line. Five minutes before half-time Hawthorne responded in kind and put the Wallabies on the board. The 3–9 scoreline at the break reflected Ireland's first-half dominance.

Australia pressed Ireland for a period after the break but a defensive lapse saw Gibson swoop for Ireland. Then the Australian back-line chimed and Boyce scored in the corner. Jim Lenehan kicked a tremendous conversion from the sideline putting Australia back in the match with the score 8–12. Ireland withstood the Australian effort in the final minutes before Gibson again showed coolness under pressure kicking another dropped goal for a 15–8 victory to Ireland.

AUSTRALIA: Jim Lenehan, Alan Cardy, Dick Marks, John Brass, Stewart Boyce, Phil Hawthorne, Ken Catchpole (c), John O'Gorman, Jules Guerassimoff, Greg Davis, Ross Teitzel, Peter Crittle, Roy Prosser, Peter Johnson, Tony Miller

IRELAND: Tom Kiernan, Alan Duggan, Barry Bresnihan, Harry Rea, Paddy McGrath, Mike Gibson, Brendan Sherry, Phil O'Callaghan, Ken Kennedy, Al Moroney, Willie John McBride, Mick Molloy, Mick Doyle, Noel Murphy (c), Ken Goodall

=== France ===
11 February 1967

France	20–14	Australia
(3 – 1t) L Camberabero (17 – 4pg, 1fg, 1g) G Camberabero		Davis (3 – 1t); Johnson (3 – 1t); Hawthorne (8 – 1pg, 1fg, 1g)

Stade Colombes, Paris
Attendance: 26,475
Referee: RW Gilliland (IRFU)

AUSTRALIA: Jim Lenehan, Stewart Boyce, Dick Marks, John Brass, Alan Cardy, Phil Hawthorne, Ken Catchpole, John Thornett (c), Peter Johnson, Tony Miller, Ross Teitzel, Rob Heming, Jules Guerassimoff, Greg Davis, John O'Gorman.

FRANCE: Jean Gachassin, Bernard Duprat, Jean-Pierre Mir, Claude Dourthe, Christian Darrouy (c), Guy Camberabero, Lilian Camberabero, Jean-Claude Berejnoi, Jean-Michael Cabanier, Arnaldo Gruarin, Benoît Dauga, Walter Spanghero, Michel Sitjar, Christian Carrère, André Herrero

== Touring party ==
- Tour Manager: Bill McLaughlin
- Assistant Manager : Alan Roper
- Captain: John Thornett
- Vice-captain : Ken Catchpole

=== Squad ===
Name	Tests	Club	Career caps	Tour Apps	Position	Pts
Jim Lenehan	5	Wagga Wagga	24	23.	Full-back	74
John Francis	0					
Alan Cardy	5	Drummoyne DRFC	9		Three-quarter	
Stewart Boyce	5		13		Three-quarter	
Dick Marks	5		17		Three-quarter	
Tony Moore	0				Three-quarter	
John Brass	5	Randwick DRUFC	12		Three-quarter	
Ken Catchpole	5	Randwick DRUFC	27		Half-back	
Phil Hawthorne	4	Wanderers Newcastle	21		Half-back	
Paul Gibbs	1		1		Half-back	
John Hipwell	0	Armidale City	36		Half-back	
John Thornett (c)	1	Northern Suburbs Rugby Club	37		Forward	
Greg Davis	5	Drummoyne DRFC	39		Forward	
Peter Johnson	5	Sydney University	42		Forward	
John O'Gorman	5		18		Forward	
David Taylor	0				Forward	
Dick Taylor	0				Forward	
Russell Tulloch	0				Forward	
Peter Ryan					Forward	
Phil Smith					Forward	
Rob Heming	2	Manly RUFC	21		Forward	
Peter Crittle		Sydney University			Forward	
Tony Miller	4	Manly RUFC	41		Forward	
Roy Prosser	2	Northern Suburbs Rugby Club	25		Forward	
Dick Webb	0				Forward	
Michael Purcell	3		3		Forward	
Jim Miller	3		7		Forward	
Denis O'Callaghan	0				Forward	
Jules Guerassimoff	3	University of Queensland	12		Forward	
Ross Cullen	0		1		Forward	
Ross Teitzel	5	University of Queensland	7		Forward	

== Published sources ==
- Howell, Max (2005) Born to Lead – Wallaby Test Captains, Celebrity Books, Auckland NZ
