= 1961 Australia rugby union tour of South Africa =

- Tour captain: Ken Catchpole
Summary
P	W	D	L
Total
6	3	1	2
Test match
2	0	0	2
Opponent
P	W	D	L
South Africa
2	0	0	2

The 1961 Australia rugby union tour of Southern Africa was a series of six rugby union matches played by the Wallabies in July and August 1961.

The test series was won by the Springboks with two wins from two matches.

== Matches ==
Scores and results list Wallaibies' points tally first.

Opposing Team	For	Against	Date	Venue	Status
South-West Africa	14	14	27 July 1961	Windhoek	Tour Match
Boland	11	3	30 July 1961	Wellington, Western Cape	Tour Match
North Eastern Cape	34	3	2 August 1961	Burgersdorp	Tour Match
South Africa	3	28	5 August 1961	Johannesburg	Test Match
Border	17	9	9 August 1961	East London	Tour Match
South Africa	11	23	12 August 1961	Port Elizabeth	Test Match

== Touring party ==
- Tour Manager: Bjarne Halvorsen (NSW)
- Captain/Coach: Ken Catchpole (NSW)
- Michael Cleary (NSW)
- John Dowse (NSW)
- Owen Edwards (QLD)
- Beres Ellwood (NSW)
- Ted Heinrich (NSW)
- Rob Heming (NSW)
- Peter Johnson (NSW)
- Jim Lenehan (NSW)
- Jim Lisle (NSW)
- Graeme MacDougall (NSW)
- Don McDeed (NSW)
- Ted Magrath (NSW)
- Tony Miller (NSW)
- John O'Gorman (NSW)
- Rod Phelps (NSW)
- Terry Reid (NSW)
- Harry Roberts (QLD)
- John Thornett (NSW)
- Dick Thornett (NSW)
- Jon White (NSW)
