= List of GPS sporting alumni =

This is a list of GPS sporting alumni. The list contains names of notable sportspeople from the Athletic Association of the Great Public Schools of New South Wales.

== Basketball ==
- Jackson Aldridge (Riverview)
- Grant Anticevich (Newington)
- Josh Green (Kings)
- Isaac Humphries (Scots)
- Jordan Hunter (Riverview)
- Nick Kay (Newington)
- Greg MacQuillan (Riverview)
- Craig Moller (SBHS)
- Hunter Madden (Shore)
- Henry Lau (SBHS)
- James O’Donnell (Shore)
- Goc Malual (Newington)

== Rugby union ==
- Allan Alaalatoa (Newington)
- Des Bannon (Joeys)
- Eric Bardsley (Newington)
- Ben Batger (Kings)
- Al Baxter (Shore)
- Kurtley Beale (Joeys)
- Scott Bowen (Newington)
- Tom Bowman (Scots)
- John Brass (High)
- James Brown (Newington)
- Luke Burgess (Joeys)
- Matt Burke (Joeys)
- Adam Byrnes (Newington)
- Will Caldwell (Kings)
- Alan Cameron (Newington)
- Scott Cameron (Scots)
- Alister Campbell (Joeys)
- Chris Carberry (Joeys)
- John Carroll (Newington)
- David Carter (Scots)
- Ken Catchpole (Scots)
- Mitchell Chapman (Kings)
- Bill Cody (Joeys)
- Dave Cowper (Newington)
- Percy Colquhoun (Newington)
- Peter Crittle (High)
- Tim Davidson (Kings)
- Tony Daly (Joeys)
- Steve Devine (Joeys)
- Bob Dwyer (High)
- Ted Fahey (Joeys)
- Nick Farr-Jones (Newington)
- John Grant (Riverview)
- Alan Gaffney (High)
- Tim Gavin (Scots)
- Daniel Halangahu (Kings)
- Ben Hand (Kings)
- Daryl Harberecht (Scots)
- Mike Hercus (Shore)
- James Hilgendorf (Kings)
- Aub Hodgson (Newington)
- Jake Howard (Joeys)
- James Hughes (Riverview)
- Bryan Hughes (Riverview)
- Julian Huxley (Grammar & Kings)
- Mitch Inman (Riverview)
- Jono Jenkins (Riverview)
- Jason Jones-Hughes (High)
- Peter Jorgensen (Newington & Joeys)
- Max Jorgensen (Joeys)
- Bruce Judd (Newington)
- Darren Junee (Joeys)
- Phil Kearns (Newington)
- Michael Lipman (Joeys)
- Eden Love (Newington)
- Graeme Macdougall (Newington)
- Stuart Macdougall (Newington)
- George Mackay (Newington)
- John Manning (Riverview)
- Bill McLaughlin (Newington)
- Duncan MacRae (High)
- Stirling Mortlock (Kings)
- Dean Mumm (Kings)
- Larry Newman (Newington)
- Bryan Palmer (Newington)
- Tom Perrin (Newington)
- Nick Phipps (Kings)
- Peter Playford (Joeys)
- Roy Prosser (Newington)
- David Pusey (Newington)
- Hugh Roach (Newington)
- Benn Robinson (Kings)
- Joe Roff (TAS)
- Hugh Rose (King's)
- Haig Sare (Shore)
- Brett Sheehan (Joeys)
- John Solomon (Scots)
- Richard Stanford (Scots)
- Marc Stcherbina (High)
- William Tasker (Newington)
- Hugh Taylor (Newington)
- Johnny Taylor (Newington)
- John Thornett (High)
- Richard Tombs (TAS)
- Lachlan Turner (Newington)
- Henari Veratau (Scots)
- Ben Volavola (Newington)
- Phil Waugh (Shore)
- John Williams (Newington)
- Steve Williams (Joeys)
- Marty Wilson (Kings)
- Chris Whitaker (High)
- Colin Windon (Grammar)
- Craig Wing (High)
- Bill Young (Joeys)
- David Horwitz (Scots)
- Andrew Kellaway (Scots)
- Jack Maddocks (Scots)

== Cricket ==
- Jackson Bird (Riverview)
- Albert Cotter (Grammar)
- Alan Crompton AO (Scots)
- John Davison (Riverview)
- Phil Emery (Newington & Shore)
- Edwin Evans (Newington)
- Sam Everett (Newington)
- Adam Hollioake (Joeys)
- Ben Hollioake (Joeys)
- Tom Garrett (Newington)
- Jack Gregory (Shore)
- Stork Hendry (Grammar)
- Stan McCabe (Joeys)
- Alan McGilvray (Newington & Grammar)
- Jonathon Moss (Shore)
- Fred Spofforth (Grammar)
- Johnny Taylor (Newington)
- Alan Walker (Grammar)
- Sammy Woods (Grammar)

== Athletics ==
- Nigel Barker (Newington)
- Daniel Batman (Scots)
- Jim Carlton (Joeys)
- Nicholas Hough (Kings)
- Patrick Dwyer (Joeys)
- Joshua Lodge (High)
- Morgan McDonald (Newington)
- Evan O'Hanlon (Joeys)
- Josh Ralph (Newington)
- Andrew Ratcliffe (Scots)
- Lachlan Renshaw (Grammar)
- Stephen Wilson (Newington)

== Tennis ==
- Ashley Campbell (Newington)
- Percy Colquhoun (Newington)
- Albert Curtis (Newington)
- Stanley Doust (Newington)
- James Duckworth (Shore)
- Ernest Hicks (Newington)
- Thomas Hicks (Newington)
- Jamie Morgan (High)
- John Newcombe (Grammar & Shore)
- Matthew Reid (Kings)
- Rinky Hijikata (Kings)

== Rowing ==
- Mervyn Wood (High)
- Nick Baxter (Shore)
- Daniel Noonan (Riverview)
- Tom Chessell (Newington)
- Joe Fazio (Joeys)
- Francis Hegerty (Joeys)
- Sam Loch (Kings)
- Dominic Grimm (High)
- Nicholas Hudson (Kings)
- Vern Bowrey (Newington)
- James Chapman (Newington)
- Rob Jahrling (Newington)
- Fred Kirkham (Newington)
- Matthew Long (Newington)
- Kim Mackney (Newington)
- Michael Morgan (Newington)
- Steve Handley (Newington)
- Geoff Stewart (Newington)
- James Stewart (Newington)
- Stephen Stewart (Newington)
- Stuart Welch (Grammar)
- Matthew Ryan (Kings)
- Alex Purnell (Shore)
- Nick Purnell (Shore)

== Sailing ==
- David Forbes (Newington)
- Edward Psaltis (Newington)
- Will Ryan (Riverview)

== Rugby league ==
- Jack Beaton (Joeys)
- Daniel Conn (King's)
- Arch Crippin (Joeys)
- Brian James (Newington)
- Peter Jorgensen (Newington & Joeys)
- Ben Kennedy (Joeys)
- Joel Luani (Newington)
- Taane Milne (Newington)
- Tepai Moeroa (Newington)
- Cameron Murray (Newington)
- Mark O'Halloran (Joeys)
- Jarrod Saffy (Joeys)
- Ben Volavola (Newington)
- Craig Wing (High)
- Angus Crichton (Scots)
- Billy Smith (Scots)
- Joseph-Aukuso Sua'ali'i (Kings)
- Viliami Penisini (Kings)

== NFL ==
- Colin Scotts (Scots)

== Football ==
- Daniel Alessi (Joeys)
- Daniel Arzani (High)
- Harry Ascroft (Shore)
- Jonathan Aspropotamitis (Newington)
- Adam Biddle (Riverview)
- Travis Cooper (Kings)
- Nicola Kuleski (Newington)
- Chris Triantis (Newington)
- Cristian Volpato (Joeys)

== Australian rules football ==
- Leo Barry (Riverview)
- Ryan Davis (Kings)
- Jack Hiscox (Newington)
- Malcolm Lynch (Riverview)
- Henry Playfair (Shore)
- Dane Rampe (Newington)
- Lewis Roberts-Thomson (Shore)
- Will Sierakowski (Riverview)
- Dan Robinson (Riverview)
- Josh Bruce (Riverview)
- Sam Wicks (Shore)
- Joel Cochran (Scots)

== Swimming ==
- Forbes Carlile MBE (Scots)
- Andrew "Boy" Charlton (Grammar)
- Michael Delany (Riverview)
- Ernest Henry (High)
- Frederick Lane (Grammar)

== Waterpolo ==
- James Clark (Newington)
- Sam McGregor (Joeys)
- Thomas Whalan (Scots)
- Hamish McDonald (Scots)
