= England v President's Overseas XV =

1971 rugby union match

- Official programme
- Event: Rugby Football Union Centenary
England	President's Overseas XV
11	28
- Date: 17 April 1971
- Venue: Twickenham Stadium, London
- Referee: M Titcomb (Gloucestershire)
- Attendance: 50,000

England v President's Overseas XV was a 1971 rugby union match between England and a President's Overseas XV. The match was played to celebrate the centenary of the Rugby Football Union. The President's Overseas XV featured players from Australia, Fiji, France, New Zealand and South Africa and was effectively a World XV. The President's Overseas XV won 28-11.

As preparation for the international match the President's XV played and won three other matches against regional selections: London, Midland & Home Counties, the North and the South & South West Counties.

The game was played at Twickenham in front of 50,000 spectators. Test caps were awarded, and Dixon and Creed earned their first caps for England in this match.

== Squads ==
=== President's Overseas ===
Pos.	Name	Nationality
B	Pierre Villepreux	France
W	Stephen Knight	Australia
B	Jo Maso	France
B	Joggie Jansen	South Africa
W	Bryan Williams	New Zealand
B	Wayne Cottrell	New Zealand
B	Dawie de Villiers	South Africa
F	Roy Prosser	Australia
F	Peter Johnson	Australia
F	Hannes Marais	South Africa
F	Colin Meads	New Zealand
F	Frik du Preez	South Africa
F	Greg Davis	Australia
F	Ian Kirkpatrick	New Zealand
F	Brian Lochore (captain)	New Zealand
W	John Cole	Australia
B	Sid Going	New Zealand
F	Ron Urlich	New Zealand
F	Jona Qoro	Fiji
B	Roland Bertranne	France
B	George Barley	Fiji
F	Élie Cester	France
F	Christian Carrère	France
B	Ian McCallum	South Africa

== Match details ==
17 April 1971

England	11–28	President's Overseas XV
Try: Hiller; Con: Hiller (1/1); Pen: Hiller (2/?)	Report	Try: Kirkpatrick (2); Marais; Williams (3); Con: Villepreux (5/6)

Twickenham Stadium, London
Referee: M Titcomb (Gloucestershire)
Touch judge - Air Cdre G.C.Lamb CBE AFC (RAF)
Touch judge -R.F.Johnson (Kent)

England
President's Overseas

FB	15	Bob Hiller (Harlequins)
RW	14	Jeremy Janion (Bedford)
OC	13	John Spencer (c) (Headingley)
IC	12	David Duckham (Coventry)
LW	11	Peter Glover (Bath & R.A.F.)
FH	10	Dick Cowman (Loughborough Colleges)
SH	9	Nigel Starmer-Smith (Harlequins)
LP	1	Stack Stevens (Harlequins)
HK	2	John Pullin (Bristol)
TP	3	Fran Cotton (Loughborough Colleges)
LL	4	Peter Larter (Northampton & R.A.F.)
RL	5	Chris Ralston (Richmond)
BF	6	Roger Creed (Coventry)
OF	7	Tony Neary (Broughton Park)
N8	8	Peter Dixon (Harlequins)
Coach:

FB	15	Pierre Villepreux
RW	14	Stephen Knight
OC	13	Jo Maso
IC	12	Joggie Jansen
LW	11	Bryan Williams
FH	10	Wayne Cottrell
SH	9	Dawie de Villiers
LP	1	Roy Prosser
HK	2	Peter Johnson
TP	3	Hannes Marais
LL	4	Colin Meads
RL	5	Frik du Preez
BF	6	Greg Davis
OF	7	Ian Kirkpatrick
N8	8	Brian Lochore (c)
Coach:

== See also ==
- World XV

== Bibliography ==
- Starmer-Smith, Nigel (ed) Rugby - A Way of Life, An Illustrated History of Rugby (Lennard Books, 1986 ISBN 0-7126-2662-X) pp 106, 107 (including portrait of each player)
