= Dallas O'Neill =

Australian rugby union player (1943–2026)

- Full name: Dallas John O'Neill
- Born: 9 March 1943 Mackay, Queensland, Australia
- Died: 28 March 2026 (aged 83) Byron Bay, New South Wales, Australia

Rugby union career
- Position: No. 8
International career
Years	Team	Apps	(Points)
1964	Australia	2	(0)
- Rugby league career

Playing information
- Position: Front row, second row
Club
Years	Team	Pld	T	G	FG	P
1967–1971	South Sydney	15				0

Dallas John O'Neill (9 March 1943 – 28 March 2026) was an Australian rugby union international who represented Australia in two Test matches. He also played rugby league for the South Sydney Rabbitohs.

== Biography ==
O'Neill, born and raised in Mackay, Queensland, was educated at St Joseph's College, Nudgee as a boarder. He made his first Queensland representative appearance at the age of 19, only weeks after he had debuted in first-grade for Brothers.

A number eight, O'Neill had early international experience as a Wallabies reserve on the 1962 tour of New Zealand, playing five uncapped matches. He was set to receive his first cap on the following year's tour of South Africa, but had to withdraw from the 1st Test team with a groin injury, which sidelined him for the remainder of the series. On his return to New Zealand for the 1964 tour, O'Neill made his Test debut at Carisbrook and gained a second cap at Lancaster Park.

He was signed by rugby league club South Sydney in 1967, along with Wallabies teammate Bob Honan. His code switch was not as successful as Honan's, due to limited opportunities in first-grade. He was hampered by a cruciate ligament injury in his first few seasons and spent much of his time in the reserve grade.

O'Neill died in Byron Bay on 28 March 2026, at the age of 83.

== See also ==
- List of Australia national rugby union players
