= Tony Moore (rugby union) =

Australia international rugby union player

- Full name: Anthony Michael Charles Moore
- Born: 6 October 1938 (age 88) Sydney, NSW, Australia
- School: Waverley College

Rugby union career
- Position: Fly-half
Provincial / State sides
Years	Team	Apps	(Points)
- New South Wales
International career
Years	Team	Apps	(Points)
1966–67	Australia		

Anthony Michael Charles Moore (born 6 October 1938) is an Australian former international rugby union player.

Moore was born in Sydney and educated at Waverley College.

Primarily a fly-half, Moore was co-captain of Randwick in 1962 and made 132 first–grade appearances for the club, scoring a total of 49 tries. He was one of eight Randwick players called up by the Wallabies for the 1966–67 northern hemisphere tour, during which he played in 14 uncapped matches, with Phil Hawthorne the preferred Test fly-half.

== See also ==
- List of Australia national rugby union players
