= Mel Dunne =

- Full name: Melvin Robert Dunne
- Born: 16 December 1934 Wellington, New Zealand
- Died: 26 February 2002 (aged 67) Christchurch, New Zealand
- School: Wellington College
- University: University of Canterbury
- Occupation: Civil engineer

Rugby union career
- Position: Flanker / Lock
Provincial / State sides
Years	Team	Apps	(Points)
1957–1961, 1965	Canterbury		
1962	Marborough	3	
1962–1963	Wellington	12	(6)
1964	North Otago	9	
1966–1967	New South Wales Country		
1967	New South Wales		
International career
Years	Team	Apps	(Points)
1965	NZ Universities	1	
1967	Australia		
- Cricket career

Cricket information
- Batting: Right-handed
- Bowling: Right-arm medium

Domestic team information
- Years: Team
- 1961/62: Marlborough

Melvin Robert Dunne (16 December 1934 – 26 February 2002) was a New Zealand-born rugby union player.

== Biography ==
Dunne was born and raised in Wellington. After attending Wellington College, Dunne went south and studied engineering at the University of Canterbury, where he also played rugby and featured in three 'A'-grade premiership-winning campaigns, while also earning NZ Universities honours. He competed for Canterbury during this period and was an All Blacks triallist, coming close to selection for their 1960 tour of South Africa. A flanker turned lock, Dunne was also a South Island representative player.

As a civil engineer, Dunne relocated several times through his work, which saw him play rugby with Marlborough, Wellington and North Otago in the early 1960s. He moved to Australia in 1966 and worked for the Snowy Mountains Authority. Impressing in appearances for Cooma, Dunne gained New South Wales Country selection for their match against the 1966 British Lions, then made the New South Wales state team in 1967, featuring in their win over Ireland. Following this, Dunne was a Wallabies reserve against Ireland in Sydney, as back up for Ross Teitzel and Michael Purcell.

Dunne was also a cricketer, representing Marlborough in two Hawke Cup matches during the 1961–1962 season. In 1959, he became engaged to Jennifer Blazey, daughter of the sports administrator Harry Blazey, and the couple later married.

Dunne died in Christchurch on 26 February 2002. His wife, Jenny, died in 2020.

== See also ==
- List of Australia national rugby union players
