= Alan Skinner (rugby union) =

- Born: Alan James Skinner; 16 July 1942 Sydney

Rugby union career
- Position: lock
International career
Years	Team	Apps	(Points)
1969–70	Wallabies	3	(0)

Alan James Skinner (born 16 July 1942) was a rugby union player who represented Australia.

Skinner, a lock, was born in Sydney and claimed a total of 3 international rugby caps for Australia.

He graduated from Sydney Boys High School in 1959, where he played with fellow Wallabies John Brass and Peter Crittle.
