= Ross Cullen (rugby union) =

Australia international rugby union player

- Full name: Ross Ralph Cullen
- Born: 6 November 1937 (age 89) Taumarunui, New Zealand
- School: Taumarunui High School

Rugby union career
- Position: Hooker
Provincial / State sides
Years	Team	Apps	(Points)
1965–68	Queensland	21	
International career
Years	Team	Apps	(Points)
1966–67	Australia		

Ross Ralph Cullen (born 6 November 1937) is an Australian former international rugby union player.

Born in New Zealand, Cullen grew up in the north island town of Taumarunui, then immigrated to Australia during the early 1960s, settling initially in the NSW Riverina region.

Cullen became the Queensland hooker after relocating to Brisbane in 1965 and soon came to the attention of Wallabies selectors, earning an invitation to the trials for the 1966–67 tour of Britain, Ireland and France. He fought off competition from NSW hooker Dick Taylor to be named in the 30-man squad, as back up for Peter Johnson.

After making his Wallabies debut in a loss to North-East Counties, Cullen next appeared in their match against Oxford University at Iffley Road, where he was involved in a controversial incident with the varsity side's Ireland international Ollie Waldron. It was alleged that he had bitten the ear of Waldron and after an internal inquiry was sent home by team manager Bill McLaughlin, with Dick Taylor named his replacement.

Cullen captained Brisbane club Easts in first grade.

== See also ==
- List of Australia national rugby union players
