= David Taylor (rugby union, born 1944) =

Australian rugby union international

- Full name: David Aubrey Taylor
- Born: 11 November 1944 (age 82) Brisbane, Australia

Rugby union career
- Position: No. 8
International career
Years	Team	Apps	(Points)
1968	Australia	5	(0)

David Aubrey Taylor (born 11 November 1944) is an Australian former rugby union international.

A native of Brisbane, Taylor attended Anglican Church Grammar School, where he showed abilities in multiple sports. He threw shot put, was a fast bowler on the All Schools’ cricket team and had two seasons in the school's 1st XV, earning GPS 1st XV honours. After school, Taylor played briefly for GPS Old Boys.

Taylor, a University of Queensland number eight, made the 1966–67 tour of Britain, Ireland and France with the Wallabies, but was kept out of the Test matches by incumbent forward John O'Gorman. He gained all five of his Wallabies caps in 1968, playing home Tests against the All Blacks and France, then the Ireland and Scotland matches on the tour of British Isles. The following year, Taylor had to retire with a serious neck injury, at the age of 24.

== See also ==
- List of Australia national rugby union players
