= Jim Boyce (rugby union) =

Australian rugby union international

- Full name: James Stewart Boyce
- Born: 14 December 1941 (age 84) Sydney, Australia
- School: Scots College, Sydney
- University: University of Sydney
- Notable relative: Stewart Boyce (twin brother)

Rugby union career
- Position: Wing
International career
Years	Team	Apps	(Points)
1962–65	Australia	12	(3)

James Stewart Boyce (born 14 December 1941) is an Australian former rugby union international.

Boyce was born in Sydney and attended Scots College, where he played in a GPS premiership with the 1st XV.

A winger, Boyce gained Wallabies selection the first time for the 1962 tour of New Zealand and scored 10 tries in his opening three tour matches, including six against Wairarapa. He was rewarded with a Test debut in Wellington. His 12 Wallabies caps included matches with twin brother Stewart, who would play on the other wing.

Boyce was selected for the 1963 tour of South Africa, where he was shocked at the treatment of Black South African's during apartheid. This was symbolised by then Justice Minister and future Prime Minister John Vorster, who told him "no black man will ever wear the Springbok jersey". This experience caused him and six other Wallabies to demonstrate against the 1971 South Africa tour of Australia taking place. During the 1971 tour, he supplied Springbok jerseys he had received in 1963 to Indigenous activists. Leading to embarrassment for the South Africans, when the police paraded them in front of the South African team. Believing the jerseys to have been stolen.

== See also ==
- List of Australia national rugby union players
