= John Francis (rugby union) =

- Full name: John Allan Francis
- Born: 18 January 1942 (age 84) Kempsey, NSW, Australia
- School: Kempsey High School

Rugby union career
- Position: Inside centre
Provincial / State sides
Years	Team	Apps	(Points)
- New South Wales
International career
Years	Team	Apps	(Points)
1966–67	Australia		

John Allan Francis (born 18 January 1942) is an Australian former international rugby union player.

Francis was a rugby league five-eighth at Kempsey High School and didn't start playing the rival code until he moved to Sydney to attend teachers' college. He played alongside future Wallaby Jimmy Lisle on the Sydney Teachers' College side, as well as in first-grade with Randwick, where he was part of three successive premiership teams.

One of eight Randwick players on the Wallabies 1966–67 tour of Britain, Ireland and France, Francis tore his hamstring in training prior to the opening fixture, causing him to miss the next eight weeks. He appeared in five uncapped tour fixtures on his return, debuting against Cornwall & Devon, but didn't feature in the Test matches.

== See also ==
- List of Australia national rugby union players
