= Terry Reid (rugby union) =

Australian rugby player (1934–2017)

- Full name: Terrence William Reid
- Born: 20 September 1934 Clovelly, Sydney, Australia
- Died: 30 April 2017 (aged 82)
- Height: 179 cm (5 ft 10 in)
- Weight: 79 kg (174 lb)

Rugby union career
- Position: Flanker
International career
| Years | Team | Apps | (Points) |
| 1961–62 | Australia | 5 | (3) |

Terrence William Reid (20 September 1934 — 30 April 2017) was an Australian rugby union international.

Reid, raised in Sydney's eastern suburbs, was educated at Randwick Boys High School, representing Combined High Schools in both rugby union and water polo. He was a product of Randwick juniors.

A lightly built flanker, Reid was capped five times by the Wallabies, debuting against Fiji at the Exhibition Ground, Brisbane in 1961. Later that year, Reid made the Wallabies team for the tour of South Africa.

Reid made 10 appearances for New South Wales and played over 100 first-grade games for Randwick.

== See also ==
- List of Australia national rugby union players
