= Teitzel =

Teitzel is a surname. Notable people with the surname include:

- Craig Teitzel (born 1963), Australian former professional rugby league footballer
- Romy Teitzel (born 1999), Australian rugby league footballer
- Ross Teitzel (born 1946), Australian former rugby union international
