= Larry Newman =

Larry or Lawrence Newman may refer to:

- Larry Newman (rugby union) (1902–1963), rugby union player who represented Australia
- Larry Newman (aviator) (1947–2010), American pilot and balloonist
- Lawrence R. Newman (1925–2011), deaf activist and educator
