= Jim Miller (rugby union) =

Australian rugby union international

- Full name: James Muir Miller
- Born: 6 April 1939 (age 87) Kiama, NSW, Australia
- Height: 6 ft 1 in (185 cm)

Rugby union career
- Position: Lock / Prop
International career
Years	Team	Apps	(Points)
1962–67	Australia	6	(0)

James Muir Miller (born 6 April 1939) is an Australian former rugby union international.

A native of Kiama, Miller was a farmer by trade and made his first NSW Country representative appearance in 1959 at the age of 20, playing against the touring British Lions.

Miller was capped six times for the Wallabies, debuting as a lock against the All Blacks at the Brisbane Exhibition Ground in 1962. He gained a further two caps in 1963, which included a Test in Pretoria on the tour of South Africa.

Following an extended period out of the national team, Miller was a surprise recall for the 1966–67 tour of Britain, Ireland and France. He was used as a prop in the Test matches against Wales, Scotland and England. The tour finished in Canada and Miller was given the captaincy for a match against British Columbia Universities.

Miller captained Manly's first-grade team.

== See also ==
- List of Australia national rugby union players
