= John Brass =

Australian dual-code rugby international footballer

- Born: John Brass; 7 October 1946 (age 80) Sydney, New South Wales, Australia
- School: Sydney Boys High School

Rugby union career
- Position: Five-eighth
Amateur team(s)
| Years | Team | Apps | (Points) |
| 1965–1988 | Randwick DRUFC | | |
International career
| Years | Team | Apps | (Points) |
| 1966–68 | Australia | 12 | |
- Rugby league career

Playing information
- Position: Centre, Five-eighth
Club
| Years | Team | Pld | T | G | FG | P |
|---|---|---|---|---|---|---|
| 1969-1976 | Eastern Suburbs | 142 | | | | 722 |
Representative
| Years | Team | Pld | T | G | FG | P |
| 1970 | New South Wales | 2 | | | | 6 |
| 1970, 1975 | Australia | 6 | | | | 0 |

John Brass (born 7 October 1946) is an Australian former rugby union and rugby league footballer – a dual-code international. He made twelve international representative rugby union appearances with the Wallabies from 1966 to 1968 and six representative rugby league appearances for the Kangaroos in 1970 and 1975, as national captain on one occasion.

== Background ==
John Brass was born in Sydney, New South Wales, Australia

== Rugby union career ==
His junior football was with the South Coogee juniors. He was educated at Sydney Boys High School, graduating in 1964 and went on to play first grade rugby with the Randwick rugby club in their premiership winning sides of 1965 to 1967. Brass credits watching Randwick scrumhalf prodigy Ken Catchpole in action at the Sydney Sports Ground in 1959 as the early inspiration for his wanting to play rugby.

He made his debut for New South Wales against Queensland in 1966 at the age of 19, and nine days later played for New South Wales against the touring British Lions. Injured for the first Test against the Lions, he then debuted for Australia in the infamous 2nd Test in Brisbane, which saw an injury-hit Australia defeated 31-nil. He then won national selection with the Wallabies for the coveted 1966–67 Australia rugby union tour of Britain, Ireland and France, playing in all five Tests and in 32 of the 36 tour matches. Partnering with veteran centre Dick Marks through all the internationals, Brass scored his first Test try for Australia against Scotland at Murrayfield. He played with in the historic Wallaby victories over Wales and England, and scored his second Test try at Twickenham against the English.

In the 1968 season, he played alongside Randwick centre Phil Smith in the 1st Bledisloe Cup Test 11–27 loss to New Zealand and the 11–10 victory over France in Sydney and was selected for the 1968 short tour of Scotland and Ireland, playing in the 3–10 defeat to Ireland and the 3–9 loss to Scotland.

After a disappointing 1968 season for Australian rugby Union, Brass announced he was switching codes, after being offered a record contract to play Rugby League with Eastern Suburbs. Brass would later reflect fondly on his amateur rugby touring days, telling film maker Theo Clark in 2016: "Overall, the encompassing thing was just what a wonderful experience it was – a dollar-a-day stuff but, you know, some people would say a dollar-a-day and we were probably overpaid."

== Rugby league career ==
Switching to rugby league in 1969 he joined the Eastern Suburbs ("Roosters") club on a then record contract of A$30,000 pa.

In 1970, he was made captain of the Roosters' first grade side and was selected for New South Wales in the interstate series against Queensland.

He represented Australia in rugby league in all three Tests against Great Britain in 1970. His international rugby league debut against Great Britain in Brisbane on 6 June 1970 alongside Phil Hawthorne saw them together become Australia's 32nd and 33rd dual code rugby internationals.

For family reasons, he made himself unavailable for the 1972 Rugby League World Cup and the 1973 Kangaroo Tour but he was selected for the 1975 World Cup series and captained Australia to victory in a game against New Zealand in that campaign. He is listed on the Australian Players Register as Kangaroo No.440.

He was part of the Roosters' premiership winning sides of 1974 and 1975, kicking two goals in the 1974 Grand Final and scoring two tries in the 1975 decider. During the 1976 NSWRFL season, Brass played as a centre for Eastern Suburbs in their unofficial 1976 World Club Challenge match against British champions St. Helens in Sydney.

== Post playing ==
Brass coached the Tweed Heads Seagulls in the Group 18 competition in 1977–78. He had a long career in shopping centre management. In 1995 he was asked to join the board of Super League and remained on the Board when the truce between the warring factions was called in 1997 and the National Rugby League was formed. He remained on the board until 2005, when he was replaced by Gorden Tallis.

== Sources ==
- Whiticker, Alan (2004) Captaining the Kangaroos, New Holland, Sydney

| Preceded by Arthur Beetson | Australian national rugby league captain 1975 | Succeeded by Greg Veivers |
