= Owen Edwards =

Owen Edwards may refer to:

- Owen Edwards (broadcaster) (1933–2010), Welsh broadcaster
- Owen Edwards (figure skater) (born 1987), Welsh ice dancer
- Owen Edwards (rugby union), Australian international rugby union player
- Owen Morgan Edwards (1858–1920), Welsh historian, educationalist and writer
- Owen Dudley Edwards (born 1938), Irish editor and historian
