= 1962 Australia rugby union tour of New Zealand =

Summary
P	W	D	L
Total
13	6	1	6
Test match
3	0	1	2
Opponent
P	W	D	L
New Zealand
3	0	1	2

The 1962 Australia rugby union tour of New Zealand was a series of thirteen matches played by the Wallabies in August and September 1962.

This tour was made two months after the All Blacks had toured Australia. The result of the first test was a draw but the Wallabies were defeated in the other two tests. So the Bledisloe Cup, contested for the first time since 1962 remained with New Zealand.

The tour marked the commencement of the successful "Thornett Era" of Australian Rugby, buoyed by the leadership skills of skipper John Thornett and the outstanding skills of greats of the game like Ken Catchpole, Peter Johnson and Rob Heming. It was the debut tour of Dick Marks and Peter Crittle who would later serve as influential administrators of Australian rugby.

== The Matches ==
Scores and results list Australia's points tally first.

Opposing Team	For	Against	Date	Venue	Status
Poverty Bay	31	6	11 August 1962	Rugby Park, Gisborne	Tour match
Counties	20	14	15 August 1962	Massey Park, Papakura	Tour match
Wairarapa	43	0	18 August 1962	Solway Showgrounds, Masterton	Tour match
Horowhenua	28	6	21 August 1962	Park Domain, Levin	Tour match
New Zealand	9	9	25 August 1962	Athletic Park, Wellington	Test match
West Coast-Buller	9	0	29 August 1962	Victoria Square, Westport	Tour match
Canterbury	3	5	1 September 1962	Lancaster Park, Christchurch	Tour match
North Otago	13	14	4 September 1962	Showgrounds Oval, Oamaru	Tour match
New Zealand	0	3	8 September 1962	Carisbrook, Dunedin	Test match
Wanganui	29	6	15 September 1962	Spriggens Park, Wanganui	Tour match
Thames Valley	14	16	18 September 1962	Sports Domain, Te Aroha	Tour match
New Zealand	8	16	22 September 1962	Eden Park, Auckland	Test match
Southland	11	16	September 1962	Rugby Park, Invercargill	Tour match
