= Phil Smith (rugby) =

Australian rugby union international

- Full name: Philip Vivers Smith
- Born: 15 July 1946 Paddington, Sydney, Australia
- Died: 22 April 2000 (aged 53)

Rugby union career
- Position: Centre
International career
| Years | Team | Apps | (Points) |
| 1967–69 | Australia | 8 | (6) |
- Rugby league career

Playing information
- Position: Centre
Club
| Years | Team | Pld | T | G | FG | P |
|---|---|---|---|---|---|---|
| 1971–73 | South Sydney | 20 | | | | 24 |

Philip Vivers Smith (15 July 1946 – 22 April 2000) was an Australian rugby union international who represented Australia in eight Test matches. He also played rugby league for South Sydney.

Educated at Sydney Boys High School, Smith was a Randwick centre and received his first Wallabies call up for the 1966–67 tour of Britain, Ireland and France. He missed the early stages of the tour after dislocating his shoulder in the Shute Shield grand final, but after linking up with the team featured in 16 uncapped matches.

Smith gained eight caps for the Wallabies from 1967 to 1969, forming a centre combination with John Brass, a Randwick teammate and former schoolmate. His maiden Wallabies cap came against the All Blacks at Athletic Park, Wellington in 1967, having been selected on the back of a three-try performance for Sydney in a win over Ireland. He played all possible Tests in 1968, before his Wallabies career was ended by a knee ligament injury on the 1969 tour of South Africa.

Smith, who had played junior rugby league for Clovelly, signed with South Sydney in 1970 and made 20 first-grade appearances over the next four years, with knee injuries continuing to hamper him.

== See also ==
- List of Australia national rugby union players
