= Ken Thornett =

Australian RL coach and former Australia international rugby league footballer

Personal information
- Born: 27 November 1937 Waverley, New South Wales, Australia
- Died: 16 August 2016 (aged 78) Sydney, New South Wales, Australia

Playing information
- Position: Fullback
Club
Years	Team	Pld	T	G	FG	P
1961–66	Leeds	131	19	2	0	61
1962–71	Parramatta	129	17	0	6	57
	Total	260	36	2	6	118
Representative
Years	Team	Pld	T	G	FG	P
1963–67	New South Wales	3	0	0	0	0
1963–64	Australia	12	6	0	0	18
1964	NSW City	1	0	0	0	0

Coaching information
Club
Years	Team	Gms	W	D	L	W%
1965–66	Parramatta	36	19	3	14	53
- Source: As of 20 June 2019
- Relatives: John Thornett (brother); Dick Thornett (brother)

Ken Thornett (27 November 1937 – 16 August 2016), also known by the nickname of "The Mayor of Parramatta", was an Australian rugby league fullback. He represented the Kangaroos in twelve Tests during 1963 and 1964 and on the off-season Kangaroo Tour.

== Sporting family ==
Ken and his two brothers were all adequate sportsmen. John Thornett was a Wallabies captain who played 37 rugby union Tests for Australia over a distinguished 13-year career from 1955. Dick Thornett represented Australia at water polo, rugby league and rugby union. Much of Dick and Ken's club football career was played together at Parramatta and they had the rare distinction of playing three international rugby league Tests together on the 1963–64 Kangaroo Tour.

== Water Polo career ==
As his summer sport, Ken was initially devoted to water polo along with his two brothers John and Dick. Under the tutorship of ex-Hungarian international Bert Vadas, he became an excellent goalkeeper with lightning quick reflexes, and was a member of Bronte's inaugural 1st Grade water polo winning team of the NSWAWPA Premiership in season 1958/59, which feat the club repeated with Ken as goalkeeper in 1959/60. Unfortunately he lost contact with water polo after departing for England to play rugby league professionally in mid 1960.

== Rugby union and UK rugby league ==
Thornett began his career playing first grade rugby union with Randwick DRUFC (in Coogee, New South Wales), and was the youngest player ever to be selected to play in a first grade union side. Switching to rugby league, Thornett played with Leeds for several seasons.

Ken Thornett played fullback in Leeds' 25–10 victory over Warrington in the Championship Final during the 1960–61 season at Odsal Stadium, Bradford on Saturday 20 May 1961, in front of a crowd of 52,177. He played fullback in Leeds' 9–19 defeat by Wakefield Trinity in the 1961 Yorkshire Cup Final during the 1961–62 season at Odsal Stadium, Bradford on Saturday 11 November 1961.

== Australian rugby league career ==
Ken Thornett was initially expected to sign with South Sydney upon a proposed return to Australia for the 1962 season, however negotiations with the Rabbitohs fell through and he signed with Parramatta. Thornett played only seven games in that first season, but the resultant six wins and a draw from those games lifted Parramatta to their first-ever finals position, following eight "wooden spoons" and a paltry 20 percent win record in all matches of the previous ten seasons 1952 to 1961. Thornett played regularly with Parramatta from 1963, and totalled 136 games for the club.

Thornett was the prominent Australian rugby league fullback in the early 1960s after Keith Barnes, and before Les Johns and Graeme Langlands.

Ken played in all six Tests of the 1963 Kangaroo tour and in 10 minor tour games. He made a further six Test appearances and by the end of his representative career in 1964 had played three Tests each against Great Britain and New Zealand, five against France and one against South Africa.

Ken Thornett captain-coached Parramatta in 1965 and 1966, but a dispute with the club saw him seek a transfer to Eastern Suburbs, but the blue and golds would not release him from the two years remaining on his contract without a large transfer fee. Ken Thornett retired at the end of 1968. He captain-coached Coonababran in Group 14 in 1969 and 1970, losing the 1969 grand-final by one point 10–9 to Baradine and winning the 1970 premiership 22–7 over Gulgong . He returned for one season under Ian Walsh in 1971 and helped Parramatta rise from last to fourth.

Thornett died in Sydney on 16 August 2016.

== Accolades ==
In 1965 he was named NSW Player of the Year. The western grandstand of Parramatta Stadium was named the Ken Thornett Stand in his honour.

In February 2008, Thornett was named in the list of Australia's 100 Greatest Players (1908–2007) which was commissioned by the NRL and ARL to celebrate the code's centenary year in Australia.
