= Rob Heming =

Australian rugby union player (1932–2023)

- Born: Robin John Heming; 11 December 1932 Namatanai, New Ireland, Territory of New Guinea (now Papua New Guinea)
- Died: 7 January 2023 (aged 90) Australia

Rugby union career
Amateur team(s)
| Years | Team | Apps | (Points) |
- Manly Marlins
Provincial / State sides
| Years | Team | Apps | (Points) |
- NSW
International career
| Years | Team | Apps | (Points) |
| 1961–1967 | Australia | 21 | |

Robin John Heming (11 December 1932 – 7 January 2023) was an Australian Lock/ No.8 rugby union player who played 21 tests for Australia between 1961 and 1967. Born in Namatanai in New Ireland off the then Australian Territory of New Guinea (now Papua New Guinea). He was educated at North Sydney Boys High School and qualified as an optometrist at what is now The University of New South Wales. He practised for many years on The Corso at Manly.

== Rugby career ==
After narrowly missing qualification for the Melbourne Olympics as a swimmer in 1956, Heming joined the Manly Marlins rugby club, and made the first grade side in his first season, playing at No.8.

He went on to play 132 first grade games for Manly between 1956-1969. He was picked for the 1957-58 Wallaby trials, and debuted for the NSW Waratahs in 1957. Establishing his optometry practice that year made him unavailable for the 1958 NZ tour.

Heming debuted for the Australia v Fiji 2nd Test Sydney in 1961, and went on the short tour of South Africa later that year, and played the first visiting French side in Australia at the end of the season. He played in the Sydney Test against the All Blacks in 1962, and toured New Zealand that year and in 1964.

He went again to South Africa in 1963, and went on the 5th Wallaby tour of the British Isles, France and Canada in 1966/7. He also played in the historic 1965 home series against the Springboks in 1965 (Australia's first series win over South Africa), and against the visiting British Lions in 1966. He retired from international rugby after the 1967 French Test in Paris on the 1966-7 tour.

Heming is often judged to be the greatest lineout jumper of the amateur era. Wallaby captain John Thornett considered him part of a talented core of "world's best players in their positions" that helped his side to a series of historic victories in the 1960s. Teammate and long serving national coaching director Dick Marks considered him the best "individual jumper" he'd ever seen.

Heming died on 7 January 2023, at the age of 90.
