= Dick Webb (rugby) =

Australia international rugby union & league player

- Full name: Richard Webb
- Born: 4 January 1940 (age 86) Rugby, Warwickshire, England
- Notable relative: Rod Webb (brother)

Rugby union career
- Position: Winger
International career
Years	Team	Apps	(Points)
1966–67	Australia		
- Rugby league career

Playing information
- Position: Winger
Club
Years	Team	Pld	T	G	FG	P
1967–69	Canterbury-Bankstown	19	5			15

Richard Webb (born 4 January 1940) is an Australian former rugby union and rugby league player.

Webb grew up in Rugby, Warwickshire, attending St. Andrew's Murray Church of England School for Boys. He played his early rugby as a fly-half for Newbold-on-Avon, before debuting for Coventry at age 18.

Emigrating to Australia in 1965, Webb joined the Melbourne Rugby Club, where he played as a three-quarter. He was a Victorian representative player and appeared against the touring British Lions in 1966. After impressing in the Wallabies trials, Webb was one of three Victorians named in the squad for the 1966–67 tour of Britain, Ireland and France, where he played in 16 tour matches. In one of those matches, against Midland Counties West, he played opposite his brother Rod, later an England winger. His performances prior to the final Test in Paris had him threatening Alan Cardy's place on the wing, but Webb ultimately finished the tour uncapped.

Webb played rugby league for Canterbury-Bankstown between 1967 and 1969, making 19 first-grade appearances.

== See also ==
- List of Australia national rugby union players
