= 1964 Australia rugby union tour of New Zealand =

Summary
P	W	D	L
Total
8	4	0	4
Test match
3	1	0	2
Opponent
P	W	D	L
New Zealand
3	1	0	2

The 1964 Australia rugby union tour of New Zealand was a series of eight matches played by the Australia national rugby union team in August 1964.

The "Wallabies " lost the series, winning one test out of three against the All Blacks but losing the other two. So the Bledisloe Cup, contested for the first time since 1962, remain owned by New Zealand.

The tour was one of the highlights of the successful "Thornett Era" of Australian Rugby, buoyed by the leadership skills of skipper John Thornett and the outstanding skills of greats of the game like Ken Catchpole, Peter Johnson and Rob Heming. Dick Marks and Peter Crittle also toured and would later become among the most influential administrators of Australian rugby.

== The Matches ==
Scores and results list Australia's points tally first.

Opposing Team	For	Against	Date	Venue	Status
Wanganui	14	0	5 August 1964	Spriggins Park, Wanganui	Tour match
Auckland	6	11	8 August 1964	Eden Park, Auckland	Tour match
East Coast	28	3	11 August 1964	Whakarua Park, Ruatoria	Tour match
New Zealand	9	14	15 August 1964	Carisbrook, Dunedin	Test match
Mid Canterbury	10	16	18 August 1964	Showgrounds Oval, Ashburton	Tour match
New Zealand	3	18	22 August 1964	Lancaster Park, Christchurch	Test match
Bush	19	13	28 August 1964	Bush Park, Pahiatua	Tour match
New Zealand	20	5	29 August 1964	Athletic Park, Wellington	Test match
