= Greg Davis (rugby union) =

Australia international rugby union player

- Born: Gregory Victor Davis; 27 July 1939 Matamata, Waikato, New Zealand
- Died: 24 July 1979 (aged 39) Rotorua, Bay of Plenty, New Zealand
- School: Sacred Heart College, Auckland

Rugby union career
- Position: Flanker
Amateur team(s)
| Years | Team | Apps | (Points) |
| 1963–1972 | Drummoyne | 123 | |
Provincial / State sides
| Years | Team | Apps | (Points) |
| 1963–1972 | New South Wales | 27 | |
International career
| Years | Team | Apps | (Points) |
| 1963–1972 | Australia | 39 | (0) |

Gregory Victor Davis (1939–1979) was a New Zealand born, national representative rugby union player for Australia. He played at flanker and made seven international tours with Wallaby squads. He was the Australian national captain in 47 matches from 1969 to 1972 and led the Wallaby side on three overseas tours.

== Playing career ==
Born in New Zealand, Greg Davis played for Katikati in the Thames Valley, for Otahuhu in Auckland and for Tauranga in the Bay of Plenty. He trialled for the All Blacks in 1961 and moved to Australia in 1963 and there joined the Drummoyne Rugby Club Davis was immediately selected for both New South Wales and Australia in his first year in Sydney. He debuted in a Sydney Test match against England in June 1963 and the following month was selected in the squad for the 1963 Australian tour of South Africa. He played in all four Test matches of the tied series and in ten other tour matches. The next year he made the 1964 Australian tour of New Zealand playing in seven of the eight matches including all three Tests. Davis played total of 126 games for Drummoyne between 1963 and 1972, 123 of which were in the first grade.

He represented in Sydney in 1965 in a Test against the Springboks and in 1966 in two Tests British & Irish Lions. The next year he made the 1966–67 Australia rugby union tour of Britain, Ireland and France and played in twenty of the thirty-six matches including all five Tests. In 1967 he was in the Wallaby side that travelled to New Zealand for the 75th Jubilee Test and in 1968 he made the short tour of Ireland and Scotland.

Davis was first honoured with the Australian captaincy in a home match against Wales in 1969 and a few weeks later he led the Wallabies on the 1969 Australia rugby union tour of South Africa where he played in four Tests and a further seventeen tour matches. The squad was selected with an eye to youth and some experienced campaigners were left at home – all four Test matches were lost. Davis continued as national captain for the next three years in Tests at home against Scotland, South Africa and France and also led the Wallabies on the 1971 Australia rugby union tour of France and the 1972 Australia rugby union tour of New Zealand and Fiji. He played in eleven of thirteen matches in this, his final rugby tour, and at its end, he retired from rugby. Howell writes that for Davis, at 33 years and the end of a magnificent career, the seven loss and five win result of the tour was "a disaster and occasioned Davis' retirement". An injury picked up in New Zealand prevented Davis from leading the side in the Test match in Fiji on the way home. Peter Sullivan led the Wallabies to a 21–19 victory against Fiji. He had already captained Australia in two mid-week games during the New Zealand leg. The third Test in New Zealand, a 38–3 romp by the All Blacks was Greg Davis' final match.

All told he made 102 match appearances for Australia; 39 were Test matches. He captained his country in 16 Tests and in 31 other matches.

== Captaincy and style ==
Howell describes Davis as a "lead from the front" captain who "offered a 'never give up' approach that rallied the troops". His position as loose flanker required him to break quickly from the scrum and his speed and "devastating tackling proved a scourge to fly-halves". Howell regarded Davis as "a leader of men who believed a leader should lead.... a single minded flanker who gave no quarter and asked for none".

== Later life ==
After retiring from rugby in 1972 Davis moved back to New Zealand the following year to further his business career and intending to work in real estate. In 1979 he died of a brain tumour days short of his 40th birthday. He left a wife, two sons and a daughter. Benefit matches were played in Sydney and elsewhere and funds were raised to provide ongoing support to his family. In October 2014 Davis was inducted into Australia Rugby's Hall of Fame.

== Biblioography ==
- Howell, Max (2005). Born to Lead: Wallaby Test Captains. Celebrity Books. ISBN 978-18772-5218-1.
- Bray, Gordon (1995). Gordon Bray Presents... The Spirit of Rugby: A Tribute to Australian Rugby Union. HarperCollins. ISBN 0-7322-5158-3.

| Preceded by John Thornett | Australian national rugby union captain 1969–1972 | Succeeded by Peter Sullivan |
