= Jim Lenehan =

Australian rugby union player (1938–2022)

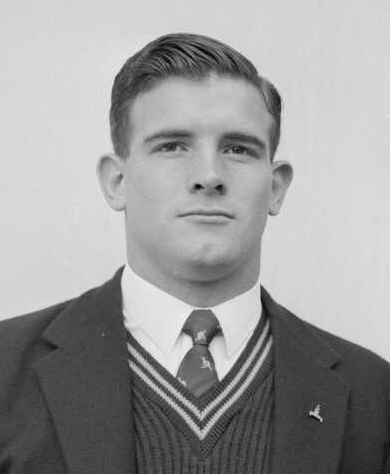
- Lenehan in 1958
- Born: James Kenneth Michael Lenehan; 29 April 1938 Wagga Wagga
- Died: 27 August 2022 (aged 84)
- Height: 6 ft 2 in (1.88 m)
- Weight: 14 st (89 kg)
- School: Saint Ignatius' College, Riverview
- Occupation: Grazier

Rugby union career
- Position(s): Three-quarter, full-back
Amateur team(s)
Years	Team	Apps	(Points)
- Wagga Waratahs
–	Narrandera		
Provincial / State sides
Years	Team	Apps	(Points)
1958–67	NSW	21	
International career
Years	Team	Apps	(Points)
1957–1967	Australia	24	

James Kenneth Michael Lenehan (29 April 1938 – 26 August 2022) was an Australian rugby union footballer. A state and national representative versatile back, he played twenty-four Test matches for Australia, once as captain. His national representative career spanned a ten-year period during which time he made two grand Wallaby tours to the northern hemisphere and Home Nations and numerous appearances against New Zealand and South Africa.

== Early life ==
A grazier's son, Lenehan was born and raised in the Riverina town of Narrandera near Wagga Wagga, New South Wales. He was sent to boarding school in Sydney at Saint Ignatius' College, Riverview. He was a schoolboy hurdler of some note at the GPS athletics level. In the 1956 GPS athletics competition, he won the open shot put with 57 feet, 21 inches, and the open 120 yards hurdles in 14.5 seconds. Riverview legend has it that the shot put hit the picket fence some way up and so the record could only be measured to the fence. His shot put record stood until 1999 and his hurdles unbeaten until 2009. After school his rugby career continued with the Wagga Wagga Waratahs and the Narrandera Rugby Club.

== Representative rugby career ==
Lenehan was a tremendous left-foot punt kicker of the ball and is said to have regularly kicked the ball 75 m in matches. He was an excellent goal-kicker and a punishing defender who used his full 14 stone playing weight to hit opponents ferociously. His potential was noticed at school by national coach Alan Roper, who also coached at Riverview. At 19 years of age with only some school and country rugby behind him, he was trialled and selected in the squad for the Wallabies 1957–58 Australia rugby union tour of Britain, Ireland and France.

His eight-month tour was a dream representative debut. His Test debut was made against Wales and he played in four of the five Tests of the tour and in thirty-two of the total forty-one games. He was the leading point scorer (114 points) and leading try scorer (13). He caused some controversy in the 3rd Test – that against England at Twickenham when he knocked England's Peter Thompson out cold in a tackle that some of the crowd felt was late and cynical. He was booed by the Twickenham crowd as he had been similarly by the crowd in the tour match against Swansea RFC three weeks earlier. In a tour which was not successful for the Wallabies (winning nil from five Tests and only winning 22 of the total 41 matches) Lenehan's performances were strong and he returned to Australian with his playing reputation enhanced.

In 1958 he made representative appearances for New South Wales and Australia against the visiting New Zealand Maori and that same year embarked on a tour of New Zealand where he played in two tour matches but was prevented from any Test appearances due to injury. In 1959 he played for Australia in both Tests against the visiting British Lions as well as in state and regional representative teams that met them. In 1961 he made his first tour to South Africa playing in five of the six possible tour matches including both Tests against the Springboks. That year he played at fullback in the one-off Sydney Test against France.

In 1962 he was honoured with the national captaincy in the second Test against the All Blacks in Sydney. He would have captained the side in the first Test but was kept out by injury and that honour went to Peter Johnson. On the tour to New Zealand that same year he was the squad's vice-captain with John Thornett commencing his leadership ascendancy at that time. Lenehan played in nine of the thirteen matches, including all three Tests and captained the side in a mid-week tour game.

Injury stopped him making any representative appearances in 1963 and he was sent home from a tour squad bound for South Africa with a knee problem. In 1965 he returned to the national scene for two Tests against the Springboks which Australia won. His devastating defensive capabilities saw him named for the 1966–67 Australia rugby union tour of Britain, Ireland and France. Along with Tony Miller he became at that time, one of only two Australian players after Nicholas Shehadie to make his second "grande tour" since till that point Wallaby tours to the British Isles and Europe were always spaced a decade apart. He enjoyed another successful tour playing in all five Tests, 23 of the 36 possible matches and placing 2nd as tour point scorer behind Phil Hawthorne. Later in 1967 he made the final state and national appearance of his illustrious career when the Ireland national team toured to Sydney.

== Accolades ==
Lenehan was inducted into the Wagga Wagga City Council, Sporting Hall of Fame and given a biographical entry on the city website.

Preceded by Peter Johnson	Australian national rugby union captain 1962	Succeeded by John Thornett
