= Stewart Boyce =

Australian rugby union international

- Full name: Edward Stewart Boyce
- Born: 14 December 1941 (age 84) Sydney, Australia
- School: Scots College, Sydney
- University: University of Sydney
- Notable relative: Jim Boyce (twin brother)
- Occupation: Gynecologist

Rugby union career
- Position: Wing
International career
Years	Team	Apps	(Points)
1962–67	Australia	13	(12)

Edward Stewart Boyce (born 14 December 1941) is an Australian former rugby union international.

A native of Sydney, Boyce is the twin brother of Wallabies winger Jim Boyce and attended Scots College.

Boyce played first-grade for Sydney University while studying medicine and starred in the team's 1961 Shute Shield title, with 14 tries during the campaign. He gained Wallabies selection the following year for New Zealand's visit, featuring in both Test matches. After a self imposed year long absence due to his studies, Boyce was a regular fixture on the wing for the Wallabies from 1964 to 1967. His two tries against New Zealand in Wellington on the 1964 tour helped the Wallabies to their greatest winning margin over the All Blacks. One of his teammates on that tour was his brother Jim, playing on the other wing. He played all five Tests on the 1966–67 tour of Britain, Ireland and France.

== See also ==
- List of Australia national rugby union players
