= John Flett (rugby union) =

Australian rugby union player

- Born: John Alexander Flett; 15 June 1963 (age 63) Manly, New South Wales

Rugby union career
Amateur team(s)
Years	Team	Apps	(Points)
1982-1990	Randwick DRUFC		
Provincial / State sides
Years	Team	Apps	(Points)
1991 - 1996	New South Wales		
International career
Years	Team	Apps	(Points)
1990-1991	Wallabies	4	(0)

John Alexander Flett (born 15 June 1963) is a former rugby union footballer. He earned 4 international caps playing for the Wallabies. He played as a winger.
