= Peter Johnson (rugby union) =

Australia international rugby union player

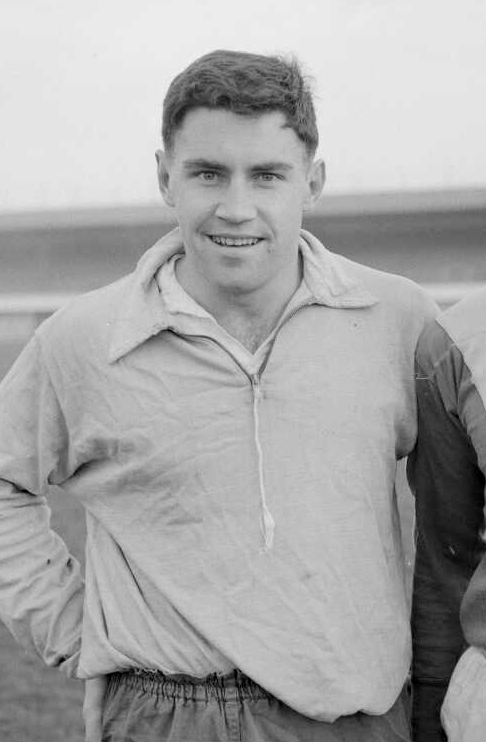
- Johnson in New Zealand in 1958
- Born: Peter George Johnson; 13 September 1936 Sydney
- Died: 12 July 2016 (aged 79)
- School: Sydney Boys High School
- University: University of Sydney

Rugby union career
- Position: Hooker
Senior career
Years	Team	Apps	(Points)
.	Eastern Suburbs	.	
.	Sydney Uni	.	
.	Randwick	215	
Provincial / State sides
Years	Team	Apps	(Points)
1959–71	New South Wales		
International career
Years	Team	Apps	(Points)
1959–71	Australia	42	(0)

Official website
- Johnson at StatsGuru

Peter George Johnson (13 September 1936 – 12 July 2016) was an Australian international rugby union player. He enjoyed a long state and international career throughout the 1960s and made 92 national appearances for his country. He captained the Australian side in five Test matches.

== Early rugby ==
Schooled at Waverley Public in Sydney's east, Johnson gained entry to Sydney Boys High School and learnt his rugby from the former rugby league international Frank O'Rourke. He was selected in the GPS 2nd XV in his last year of high school. He started his senior rugby at the Eastern Suburbs club, then moved to Randwick and then played at Sydney Uni for a spell. Back at Randwick he deputised at hooker behind the first-grade rake Jim Brown who was also the Wallaby incumbent. Johnson was selected out of second-grade to trial for the 1957–58 Australia rugby union tour of Britain, Ireland and France but did not make the squad.

== Representative career ==
Johnson started featuring in representative sides from 1958 playing for South Harbour and for the Australian Barbarians against the visiting New Zealand Maori. That year he was selected in the squad for the 1958 Australia rugby union tour of New Zealand, he played in five matches but no Tests. Howell asserts that Johnson made an affable tourist, was witty and humorous and was welcomed in the rugby tour environment.

In 1959 Johnson appeared for New South Wales and then for Australia in two Test matches against the visiting British & Irish Lions. In 1960 the All Blacks visited and he played against them for his state. The following year he met France in a Test match, then Fiji for three Tests and to follow he was selected on the Wallabies 1961 Australia rugby union tour of South Africa where he played in both Tests and two other tour matches.

In 1962 Johnson played in a New South Wales team which beat the visiting All Blacks and then in the first Test against those same visitors Johnson was honoured with selection as Australian captain when the New South Wales captain Jim Lenehan withdrew due to injury. On Lenehan's return for the 2nd Test he took the captaincy. Johnson played in that game, his tenth Test appearance for the Wallabies. Later that year the Wallabies undertook the 1962 Australia rugby union tour of New Zealand with John Thornett as squad captain. Johnson played in eight of the thirteen games including all three Test matches.

Johnson was in a victorious Wallaby side in 1963 who beat England before he then was selected for the 1963 Australia rugby union tour of South Africa. He played in sixteen matches and in all four Tests was the dominant Australian forward and matched it with the Springboks' best. Howell quotes the rugby writer Phil Tressider: "Peter Johnson showed once again that he is the outstanding hooker in international Union today.....his all round forward play was so sound that he could have held down a test position simply as prop forward". The following year he made his third tour to New Zealand on the 1964 Australia rugby union tour of New Zealand where he played in six of eight total matches including the three Tests, the 3rd an Australian victory.

Johnson was capped in further Test appearances in 1965 against South Africa and the British & Irish Lions who both visited and then in 1966 he was picked for the 1966–67 Australia rugby union tour of Britain, Ireland and France on which he played in all five Tests and sixteen other matches. He appeared in a domestic Test against Ireland in 1967 and then made his fourth visit to New Zealand for the 1967 75th anniversary Test match.

Johnson returned to the national captaincy in 1968 being honoured with the leadership of the Wallabies in the 2nd Bledisloe Cup Test against the All Blacks in the June, in a victorious Test when the French visited in August and then in two Test matches on the 1968 Australia rugby union tour of British Isles. He made five further Test appearances (none as captain), one in 1970 when Scotland toured, two against the Springboks in 1970 and two Tests on the 1971 Australia rugby union tour of France. He played in six of the ten matches of that tour and was replaced in the 2nd Test against France which, at 34 years of age, marked the end of a remarkable representative career.

== Records and accolades ==
All told Johnson played 92 matches for his country between 1958 and 1971, with 42 of those being Test matches. It was a record number of appearances at the time. Johnson made eight Wallaby tours and played 215 first grade games for his Randwick club and 24 lower grade games. When the Randwick team of the century was chosen Johnson was selected as a hooker. He died of a heart attack on 12 July 2016. Later that year he was inducted into the Australian Rugby Hall of Fame.

Preceded by Ken Catchpole	Australian national rugby union captain 1962–68	Succeeded by Jim Lenehan
