= Denis O'Callaghan (rugby league) =

Australian rugby league footballer and administrator

Personal information
- Full name: Denis Aloysius O'Callaghan
- Born: 29 May 1939 Nyngan, New South Wales
- Died: 22 May 2017 (aged 77) Tamworth, New South Wales

Playing information
- Position: Centre, Second-row
Club
Years	Team	Pld	T	G	FG	P
1968–69	St. George	15	3	0	0	9

Denis O'Callaghan was an Australian rugby league footballer who played in the 1960s. He started out in rugby union and was on the 1966–67 tour of Britain, Ireland and France with the Wallabies.

O'Callagan played two seasons at St. George between 1968 and 1969. He was a utility player that often switched from the back row to the centres during his career.

== Death ==
O'Callaghan died on 22 May 2017, at Tamworth, New South Wales.
