= Don McDeed =

Australian rugby union player (1931–2026)

- Full name: Donald Joseph McDeed
- Born: 22 March 1931 Hastings, Victoria, Australia
- Died: 29 July 2026 (aged 95)

Rugby union career
- Position: Hooker
Provincial / State sides
Years	Team	Apps	(Points)
- New South Wales
International career
Years	Team	Apps	(Points)
1961	Australia		

Donald Joseph McDeed (22 March 1931 – 29 July 2026) was an Australian international rugby union player.

== Biography ==
McDeed was born in the Victorian town of Hastings on 22 March 1931. He was educated at Sydney's St Patrick's College.

A hooker, McDeed played for Parramatta during the early 1950s, before switching to Manly. He was called up by the Wallabies in 1961 as understudy to Peter Johnson in a home series against Fiji, then kept his place for that year's tour of South Africa, featuring in their draw against South-West Africa and win over Border.

McDeed died on 29 July 2026, at the age of 95.

== See also ==
- List of Australia national rugby union players
