= Rodney Webb =

England international rugby union player

- Born: Rodney Edward Webb; 18 August 1943 (age 83) Newbold-on-Avon, England
- School: Newbold Grange High School
- Notable relative: Dick Webb (brother)

Rugby union career
- Position: wing
Amateur team(s)
| Years | Team | Apps | (Points) |
- Newbold-on-Avon RFC
| – | Coventry RFC | | |
| – | Midlands | | |
| – | Warwickshire | | |
| – | Barbarian F.C. | | |
International career
| Years | Team | Apps | (Points) |
| 1967–1972 | England | 12 | (6) |

Rodney Edward Webb (born 18 August 1943) is a former England international rugby union player.

He was capped twelve times as a wing for England between 1967 and 1972.

In 1983, Webb took over the Gilbert company in Rugby, Warwickshire, which supplied Rugby Balls. He conceived the idea of turning the company's premises into a museum, as at the time there was no museum in Britain dedicated solely to the game of rugby football. It was opened to the public as the Webb Ellis Rugby Football Museum four years later in April 1987.
