= Dick Taylor (rugby) =

Australia international rugby union & league player (1942-2019)

- Full name: Richard Lewis Taylor
- Born: 29 May 1942 Ryde, Sydney, Australia
- Died: 29 August 2019 (aged 77)

Rugby union career
- Position: Hooker
Senior career
Years	Team	Apps	(Points)
- Eastwood
International career
Years	Team	Apps	(Points)
1966–67	Australia		
- Rugby league career

Playing information
- Position: Hooker
Club
Years	Team	Pld	T	G	FG	P
1969	Newtown Jets	7				0

Richard Lewis Taylor (29 May 1942 — 29 August 2019) was an Australian rugby union and rugby league player.

Taylor was born in the Sydney suburb of Ryde and educated at Drummoyne Boys High School.

A Eastwood Juniors product, Taylor made his first-grade debut for the club in 1961. He was used as a flanker and prop during his early days at Eastwood before establishing himself as a hooker. His brothers Barry and Ken were Eastwood teammates, with the three playing a combined 600 club games. They briefly made up Eastwood's entire front row.

One month after captaining Eastwood in a first ever Shute Shield grand final, Taylor was called up by the Wallabies as a replacement player on the 1966–67 tour of Britain, Ireland and France, due to hooker Ross Cullen being sent home for disciplinary reasons. He played in 13 uncapped matches during the tour.

Taylor joined rugby league club Newtown Jets in 1969 on a two-year contract. He played seven first-grade games.

== See also ==
- List of Australia national rugby union players
