= Dick Marks =

Richard Marks AM
- Born: 6 September 1942 (age 84) Bundaberg, Queensland
- School: Brisbane Grammar School

Rugby union career
Provincial / State sides
| Years | Team | Apps | (Points) |
| 1962–69, 72 | Queensland | | |
International career
| Years | Team | Apps | (Points) |
| 1962–1967 | Australia | 17 | (6 2t) |

Richard James Pickett Marks AM (born 6 September 1942) is an Australian former rugby union footballer, noted rugby administrator and author. He played 17 Tests for Australia between 1962 and 1967, and was a captain of Queensland, for whom he played from 1962 to 1972. He served as national coaching director from 1974 to 1995, and was a leading figure in lifting the standard of Australian rugby. He also served on the Board of Queensland Rugby and was an inaugural member of rugby's International Technical Committee and drafter of the Game’s Charter. He received the Joe French Award for his contributions to Australian rugby in 2014, and remains active in debates on governance of Australian rugby. In 2020, he was inducted into the Queensland Sport Hall of Fame. In 2024, he was honoured with a Member of the Order of Australia award for significant service to rugby as a player, coach, and administrator. He is the grandfather of Queensland Reds player Curtis Browning.

== Early life, club and state rugby ==
Marks was born in Bundaberg Queensland in 1942, and later attended boarding school at Brisbane Grammar School, where he was an accomplished sportsman and scholar and captained both cricket and rugby. Marks progressed to the University of Queensland Rugby Club, and made the Queensland U19 team in 1961. He went on to play for the Queensland Reds from 1962-1969 and returned in 1972. He frequently captained the side.

== Wallaby years ==
Dick Marks played in the centres for Australia throughout the "Thornett Era", which saw the national side rise to new heights of success on the international stage. The Queenslander made an impact from an early age with his tackling skills, speed and ability to break the line. In 1962, he played for Queensland against the touring All Blacks, scoring the home side's only try. The selectors picked the 19 year old for the Second Test against the All Blacks in Sydney, however a bout of illness prevented him from playing. Later that year, he was selected for the 1962 Australia rugby union tour of New Zealand, captained by John Thornett. He debuted in the Second Test at Dunedin in the centres alongside Beres Ellwood, just two days after turning 20, and impressed with his fierce tackling. He cemented a place in the Wallaby side playing seven of 13 tour matches including two tests.

In 1963 Marks played in the historic defeat of the first England tour side in Australia, played at the SCG in driving rain. He was later selected for the watershed 1963 Australia rugby union tour of South Africa, which saw Thornett's Wallabies tie a series against South Africa for the first time, and, in the process, became the first side to score back to back victories in the two tests over the Spring Boks since 1896. Marks played in three of the four tests, setting up winger John Williams for a crucial try in the historic Third Test victory at Ellis Park, Johannesburg.

Marks was selected again for the 1964 Australia rugby union tour of New Zealand, playing six of eight matches, including the three tests. The tour featured another historic high for Australian rugby, with a 29-5 victory in the Third Test at Wellington, which remains the highest margin loss for New Zealand at home to this day. More success following in 1965, when Australia won a series over South Africa for the first time. Marks played against the Spring Boks in their two tests and for Queensland. He missed selection for Australia against the touring Lions the following year, but captained Queensland against the side. He then played in every test of the 1966–67 Australia rugby union tour of Britain, Ireland and France which saw an historic first victory over Wales and a record win over England.

Marks again played for Australia against the touring Irish in 1967, and captained Queensland against them. He then retired as Wallaby, but continued to play for Queensland until 1969 - and had a comeback season in 1972. He had played 51 matches for Australia at home and abroad, and captained the Wallabies against a French provincial side in 1967. He ranked the historic wins of the Spring Boks in 1963, New Zealand in 1964 and Wales in 1966 as career highlights.

Rugby historian Jack Pollard described him as "a versatile centre who did everything sensibly and reduced mistakes to a minimum. There was nothing flash or colourful in his football, but he tackled hard and ran strongly...". Meares and Howell wrote that "His was a proud record. He had played fifty-one matches for his country, including 17 Tests. He was highly respected by his peers, so much so that when Rothmans set up its Director of Coaching position for rugby, he obtained the position in 1974."

== Career as an administrator ==
=== National coaching director 1974-1995 ===
In 1974, Marks became the inaugural Rothmans coaching director, with responsibilities for establishing a National Coaching Scheme for Australian Rugby. He remained in the job until 1995, through an unprecedented period of success for Australian rugby. He authored an influential coaching manual, instigated a number of coach and player development initiatives, and served on the first IRB Technical Committee and wrote a Charter of the Game.

After the nadir of Australian rugby in the early 1970s and a 1973 loss to Tonga, the Australian Rugby Union created a National Coaching Plan to “teach coaches the art of coaching through demonstration and practical involvement.” As the first national Coaching Director, Marks was tasked with writing a 300 page Rugby Coaching Manual, consisting of conceptual and practical tuition. Rugby writer Spiro Zavos describes the manual as "a compendium of the best in rugby thinking and practice at the time. It is a masterpiece. If Aristotle had written about rugby, this is the sort of manual he would have produced... The point in all of this is that the National Coaching Plan worked. From the despair of the 1970s Australian rugby gloried in nearly two decades of success."

The rugby historians Meares and Howell wrote of Marks' time as Coaching Director:

What Marks achieved during his twenty-two year tenure at the job has been described with any number of accolades, but in making a judgement on his success you need go no further than the statistics. In the seven year period prior to the National Coaching Scheme, Australia had a 14% success rate over twenty-nine Test matches. By 1992 Australia had won a Grand Slam, a Bledisloe Cup series and a World Cup. Over the 110 Test matches since the introduction of the Scheme, it lifted its strike rate to 61% overall and to 72% in the last twenty nine encounters of that period.

— Peter Meares & Maxwell Howell, 2005

The Marks directorship established a number of other innovations. Russel Tulloch of Norths Rugby wrote for The Australian newspaper that under the Marks regime: "development officers used the national coaching process, the ground-breaking and world-recognised program developed under the auspices of David Clark from the Australian Institute of Sport, run by Dick Marks and Brian O’Shea, and sponsored by Rothmans. Some funding was available from the ARU but predominantly came from the clubs. This program consolidated skilled coaching processes and was available to all coaches throughout Australia. It provided a consistent and practical methodology and played a significant role in improving the quality of coaching of rugby in Australia... It is interesting to note that most of the players in the winning 1999 RWC had come from the amateur programs and were coached by people from the Clark/Marks/O’Shea program...".

Rothman's sponsorship of the program ended in the mid 1990s, and Marks was invited to continue in his position of National Director of Coaching on the payroll of the Australian Rugby Union. However, ill-health forced the resignation of the CEO, and his successor John O'Neil controversially replaced Marks with Welsh coach Alex Evans, whose background was not in coach education and whose tenure was short-lived. Nevertheless, wrote Meares and Howell, "the foundation laid by the coaching scheme ensured that outstanding Wallaby performances carried on through to the 1999 World Cup win."

=== Other administration roles ===
Marks was also an inaugural member of rugby's International Technical Committee and assisted in the drafting of the Game’s Charter.

He served as a Vice-President and Board Member of the Queensland Rugby Union. He served as the organisation's delegate to the Australian Rugby Union until 2004 and is now Life Member. In 2024, he was honoured with a Member of the Order of Australia award for significant service to rugby as a player, coach, and administrator.

== Later career ==
Marks has made a name as a public speaker and master of ceremonies, "arguably the finest sports MC in the land" according to Meares and Howell.

He remains influential in rugby circles, and in 2019 endorsed the #LetsFixAustralianRugby campaign to reform administration of the game in Australia, telling the Sydney Morning Herald: "We had a great system which won us two Rugby World Cups and produced Alan Jones, Bob Dwyer and Rod Macqueen. The emasculation of the system and the shutting down of the National Coaching Committee was the beginning of the end."

== Awards and recognition ==
In 2014, Marks was awarded the prestigious Joe French Award for outstanding service to rugby over a long period of time.

He was inducted into the Queensland Sport Hall of Fame in 2020.

In 2024, Marks became a Member of the Order of Australia in the King's Birthday Honours List for his "significant service to rugby as a player, coach, and administrator".

== Books by Dick Marks ==
- The Descent of Australian Rugby, 2021.
- National Rugby Union Coaching Plan - The Second Decade, Rothmans National Sport Foundation, 1986.

== Articles by Dick Marks ==
- Marks, Dick (19 May 2017). "Dick Marks: Rugby failed to care for its precious garden". The Australian.
- Let's Fix Australian Rugby by Dick Marks, 11 November 2019.
- The Solution? A recommended action by Dick Marks, 25 November 2019.
