= John Spencer (rugby union, born 1947) =

English rugby union player

- Born: John Southern Spencer; 10 August 1947 (age 79) Grassington, Yorkshire, England
- University: Cambridge University

Rugby union career
- Position: Centre
Senior career
Years	Team	Apps	(Points)
1966-1970s	Headingley		
1966-1969	Cambridge University		
International career
Years	Team	Apps	(Points)
1969-1971	England	14	(6)

John Southern Spencer (born 10 August 1947) is a former England international rugby union player.

== Early life ==
Spencer was born in Grassington, Yorkshire, in 1947 and educated at Cressbrook, Sedbergh School and Queens' College, Cambridge.

== Playing career ==
Spencer played for Cambridge in the Varsity Matches of 1967, 1968 and 1969. He played club rugby for Headingley as a centre and made his England debut at the age of 21 against Ireland at Lansdowne Road, Dublin, in February 1969. He went on to play 14 times for England, scoring 2 tries. His last game was against the President's Overseas XV in a Rugby Football Union centenary match at Twickenham in April 1971. He captained England in four internationals.

Spencer was selected for the 1971 British Lions tour to New Zealand and played in ten matches on the tour. He also represented the Barbarians. In a long Barbarians' career Spencer played 23 games, captained the side on 10 occasions and went on seven consecutive Easter tours to Wales. His 11 tries for the club include a hat-trick against Newport in 1973. He also played against South Africa, Scotland and Fiji in 1970.

In 2018 a quote by Spencer in When Lions Roared – suggesting that Mike Gibson had manipulated Lions team selection in 1971 to ensure his place in the Test team at the expense of Spencer and other players – led to Gibson receiving significant damages and an apology from the book's publisher.

== Administrative roles ==
Spencer was President of the RFU in 2017–18 and President of the Wharfedale R.U.F.C. in Grassington.

Spencer was the tour manager for the British & Irish Lions on their 2017 tour to New Zealand.

In December 2019 Spencer was named as President of the Barbarians. following his Presidency of the RFU and role as manager of the British & Irish Lions.

== Personal life ==
Spencer is married to Amanda and has three children and 4 grandchildren.

Sporting positions
Preceded by Tony Bucknall	English National Rugby Union Captain; 1971	Succeeded by Bob Hiller
Preceded by Bob Hiller	English National Rugby Union Captain; 1971	Succeeded by Bob Hiller
