= Russell Tulloch =

Australian rules footballer

Personal information
- Full name: Russell Tulloch
- Born: 15 January 1942 (age 84)
- Original team: Hampton
- Height: 178 cm (5 ft 10 in)
- Weight: 75 kg (165 lb)

Playing career^{1}
Years	Club	Games (Goals)
1962	South Melbourne	4 (1)
- ^{1} Playing statistics correct to the end of 1962.

Russell Tulloch (born 15 January 1942) is a former Australian rules footballer who played with South Melbourne in the Victorian Football League (VFL). He later played rugby union and was on the 1966–67 tour of Britain, Ireland and France with the Wallabies.
