= Gordon Stone (rugby union) =

Australian rugby union player (1914–2015)

- Born: Charles Gordon Stone; 6 April 1914 Coogee, New South Wales, Australia
- Died: 7 February 2015 (aged 100) Bowral, New South Wales, Australia
- School: Sydney Boys High School
- Occupation: Medical technologist

Rugby union career
Senior career
Years	Team	Apps	(Points)
1933–38	Randwick	93	(93)
International career
Years	Team	Apps	(Points)
1938	New South Wales	7	(0)
–	Australia	1	(0)

Charles Gordon Stone (6 April 1914 – 7 February 2015) was an Australian rugby union player.

== Biography ==
Stone was born in the Eastern Suburbs of Sydney, where he played rugby on the oval of the nearby Coast Hospital. He attended Sydney Boys High School, where he continued playing rugby and was selected for the school's First XV.

Upon completing his schooling in 1933, he joined the Randwick DRUFC (known as the "Galloping Greens"), with whom he played 93 matches. In 1938, he received state selection, playing seven matches for the New South Wales Waratahs. He also was selected for the national team, the Wallabies, in the same year, playing one Bledisloe Cup match against the New Zealand All Blacks on 23 July 1938.

Stone died on 7 February 2015 at a Bowral nursing home, aged 100.
