= John O'Gorman (rugby union) =

Australian rugby union international (1936–2024)

- Full name: John Francis O'Gorman
- Born: 1 June 1936 Sydney, Australia
- Died: 23 December 2024 (aged 88)

Rugby union career
- Position: Flanker / No. 8
International career
Years	Team	Apps	(Points)
1961–67	Australia	18	(0)

John Francis O'Gorman (1 June 1936 – 23 December 2024) was an Australian rugby union player.

== Biography ==
Born in Sydney, O'Gorman attended St Joseph's College, Hunters Hill and started out as a back in the school's 1st XV before transitioning into a number eight. After school, he studied medicine at the University of Sydney, where he played in two Shute Shield premierships. He was also a first-grade player for Manly during his career.

O'Gorman was capped 18 times for the Wallabies as a back-row forward from 1961 to 1967, touring South Africa in his first year with the team. He played in Australia's first ever series win over the Springboks in 1965 and was on the 1966–67 tour of Britain, Ireland and France, featuring in all five Tests. He announced his retirement in 1967.

O'Gorman died on 23 December 2024, at the age of 88.

== See also ==
- List of Australia national rugby union players
