= Jimmy Lisle =

Australia dual-code rugby international footballer

- Born: Ronald James Lisle; 19 September 1939 Grafton, New South Wales, Australia
- Died: 1 March 2003 (aged 63) Central Coast, New South Wales, Australia
- School: Grafton High School

Rugby union career
- Position: centre
Amateur team(s)
| Years | Team | Apps | (Points) |
| 1959–61 | Drummoyne DRFC | | |
Provincial / State sides
| Years | Team | Apps | (Points) |
| 1960–61 | New South Wales | | |
International career
| Years | Team | Apps | (Points) |
| 1961 | Wallabies | 4 | (6) |
- Rugby league career

Playing information
- Position: Five-eighth
Club
| Years | Team | Pld | T | G | FG | P |
|---|---|---|---|---|---|---|
| 1962–68 | South Sydney | 100 | | | | 21 |
Representative
| Years | Team | Pld | T | G | FG | P |
| 1962–65 | New South Wales | 11 | | | | 6 |
| 1962–65 | Australia | 6 | | | | 0 |

Ronald James Lisle (19 September 1939 – 1 March 2003) was an Australian rugby union and rugby league footballer and a dual code rugby international. He represented the Wallabies in 4 tests in 1961 and the Australia national rugby league team in 13 matches on the 1963 Kangaroo tour.

== Union career ==
A champion schoolboy athlete Lisle broke into first grade in 1959 with the Sydney suburban club, Drummoyne DRFC (the "Dirty Reds"). He debuted for NSW in 1960 forming a successful halves combination with Ken Catchpole. In 1961 he made his national rugby union debut as a Wallaby playing three test matches against Fiji. Later that year he made an appearance against South Africa playing inside Mike Cleary. He played rugby union at fly half or centre.

== League career ==
Along with Cleary, following the South African Wallaby tour he made the code switch and joined the South Sydney Rabbitohs in 1962 . He played 106 grade games with the club till 1968. After just one appearance in the professional code in 1961 he was selected for New South Wales. Three weeks later with still only one club appearance under his belt Lisle made his international rugby league debut in the third test in Sydney against the visiting Great Britain. This stands as the fastest rise to international representative status in Australian rugby league history.

At season end after just five club appearances he was selected in the all conquering 1963 Kangaroo tour of England and France though he did not play in any Tests on the tour. He was Australia's 30th dual code rugby international following Michael Cleary and preceding Dick Thornett.

Lisle played in the premiership winning Souths side of 1967. He played his rugby league at five-eighth.

Post football Lisle studied for a Masters of Education at the University of Oregon in the USA. He died in 2003.

Outside of Rugby League duties he was a Physical Education Teacher at Bass and Randwick Boys High, and Wyong Technology High School. PE teacher Orara High School, Coffs Harbour. He also taught at Homebush Boys High between 1961 and 1963.

In 2004 he was named by the Souths in their South Sydney Dream Team, consisting of 17 players and a coach representing the club from 1908 through to 2004.

=== League playing record ===
- Club: South Sydney Rabbitohs 106 games, 35 tries
- Representative: Australia 6 Tests.
