= Pringle Fisher =

Scotland international rugby union player (1939–2009)

James Pringle Fisher (March 17, 1939, Edinburgh – April 24, 2009, Edinburgh) was a Scottish international rugby union captain and Olympic basketball player.

He won 25 caps for Scotland.
