= Alan Roper =

English footballer

Personal information
- Full name: Alan John Roper
- Date of birth: 21 May 1939 (age 87)
- Place of birth: Tipton, England
- Position: Defender

Senior career*
Years	Team	Apps	(Gls)
1959–1965	Walsall	53	(2)
- * Club domestic league appearances and goals

Alan John Roper (born 21 May 1939) is an English former professional footballer. He made 53 appearances in the Football League for Walsall, leaving the club in 1965.
