= Jules Guerassimoff =

- Born: 28 June 1940 (age 86) Thangool, Queensland

Rugby union career
- Position: Flanker
International career
Years	Team	Apps	(Points)
1963–1967	Australia	12	(0)

Jules Guerassimoff (born 28 June 1940) in Thangool, Queensland is an Australian former Rugby Union international player. He played 12 times for the national team between 1963 and 1967 as a flanker.

In 2000 Guerassimoff became a recipient of the Australian Sports Medal.
