= Owen Edwards (rugby union) =

- Full name: Owen Fairclough Edwards
- Born: 15 June 1941 Brisbane, QLD, Australia
- Died: 7 January 2021 (aged 79)

Rugby union career
- Position: Halfback
Provincial / State sides
Years	Team	Apps	(Points)
1961–67	Queensland		
International career
Years	Team	Apps	(Points)
1961	Australia		

Owen Fairclough Edwards (15 June 1941 – 7 January 2021) was an Australian international rugby union player.

Edwards was educated at Anglican Church of England Grammar School in Brisbane, where he coxed the 1st VIII and featured in their 1959 Great Public Schools 1st XV premiership team.

A halfback, Edwards played his senior rugby with Brisbane club GPS. He had his breakthrough year in 1961 when he made his Queensland representative debut, was a Wallabies reserve in a home Test against Fiji, then made two uncapped international appearances on a tour of South Africa, backing up Ken Catchpole.

== See also ==
- List of Australia national rugby union players
