= Paul Gibbs (rugby union) =

- Born: Paul Roderick Gibbs; 6 December 1941 Birmingham

Rugby union career
- Position: fly-half
International career
Years	Team	Apps	(Points)
1966	Wallabies	1	(0)
1972	Hong Kong	1	(0)

Paul Roderick Gibbs (born 6 December 1941) is a former rugby union player who represented Australia.

Gibbs, a fly-half, was born in Birmingham and claimed one international rugby cap for Australia. He also played for Hong Kong.
