= Dick Thornett =

Australian sportsman

Personal information
- Born: Richard Norman Thornett; 23 September 1940 Sydney, New South Wales, Australia
- Died: 12 October 2011 (aged 71) Sydney, New South Wales, Australia
- Relatives: John Thornett (brother); Ken Thornett (brother)
- Water polo career
- Sport: Water polo
National team
- Years: Team
- 1960: Australia men's national water polo team

Sport

Rugby union career
- Position: Lock
Amateur team(s)
Years	Team	Apps	(Points)
1961–62	Randwick DRUFC		
International career
Years	Team	Apps	(Points)
1961–62	Australia	11	(6)
- Rugby league career

Playing information
- Position: Second-row
Club
Years	Team	Pld	T	G	FG	P
1963–71	Parramatta Eels	160				173
1972	Eastern Suburbs	9				3
	Total	169	0	0	0	176
Representative
Years	Team	Pld	T	G	FG	P
1963–69	New South Wales	13				21
1963–68	Australia	11				3

Richard Norman Thornett (23 September 1940 – 12 October 2011) was one of five Australians to have represented their country in three sports. He was an Olympic water polo player before becoming a rugby league and rugby union player – a dual code international representative.

== Early life ==
Thornett was raised in Sydney and educated at Randwick Boys High School.

== Water Polo career ==
As his summer sport, Dick followed in the footsteps of his two older brothers and was drawn to playing water polo for Bronte Amateur Water Polo Club. Under the leadership of his brother John Thornett and the expert coaching of ex-Hungarian international Bert Vadas, Dick became an excellent water polo player with a legendary shot at goal, and was a member of Bronte's inaugural 1st Grade water polo winning team in the NSWAWPA Premiership season of 1958/59, which they repeated in the 1959/60, 1960/61 and 1961/62 seasons. Representing Bronte at the age of 17, Dick was chosen in the NSW State water polo team in 1958 where he competed at the Australian Water Polo Championships in Sydney, and was selected to represent NSW on three other occasions at the Australian Water Polo Championships in Perth (1959), Melbourne (1960) and Adelaide (1961). Dick was also selected to represent Australia at water polo at age 20 for the 1960 Rome Olympic Games. Unfortunately, he was later banned from playing water polo by the Australian Swimming Union after he turned 'professional' by joining Parramatta Rugby League Club in 1962.

== Rugby Union career ==
A Randwick DRUFC forward, in his two senior seasons in rugby union in 1961 and 1962 Thornett made eleven national representative Tests appearances for the Wallabies. On the Wallabies 1961 tour of South Africa Thornett was in the squad with his brother John Thornett and they played Test matches together. Dick left the amateur code after two years to join his brother Ken Thornett at the Parramatta Eels.

== Rugby League career ==
Thornett was a second-rower, and joined his brother Ken at the Parramatta Eels in 1963. He played there until 1971, making 168 appearances for the club, being a master ball player informing the style-changing ball skills that Arthur Beetson would bring to forward play shortly after Thornett. In a club game against Canterbury in 1968 Thornett matched the then standing club record of four tries in a match.

In 1969 he appeared as a guest player for Auckland in a match against the New Zealand national rugby league team to mark the New Zealand Rugby League's diamond jubilee.

He made national representative appearances for the Kangaroos in Tests against South Africa in 1963, on the 1963–64 Kangaroo tour and in three matches of the 1968 World Cup.

His international rugby league debut in the First Test against South Africa in Brisbane on 20 July 1963 saw Thornett become Australia's 28th dual code rugby international, following Michael Cleary and preceding Jim Lisle. Ken Thornett also appeared in that Test match, making the brothers the first to play together in an Australian test side since Bill and Viv Farnsworth in 1912.

Thornett's final two club seasons at Parramatta were affected by a bout of hepatitis and he saw out the final year of his career with a season at Easts.

While playing rugby, Thornett also served in the New South Wales Police Force and in 2008, rugby league's centennial year in Australia, he was named as a reserve in a NSW Police team of the century.

== Sporting brothers ==
Thornett was born into a family of legendary footballing brothers. John Thornett was an acclaimed Wallaby captain who played 37 Rugby Union Tests for Australia over a distinguished 13-year career from 1955. Ken Thornett was the leading Australian rugby league fullback in the early sixties. Ken earned 12 Test caps for Australia and played alongside Dick at Parramatta over a 136-game club career.

John and Dick Thornett both played together in Wallabies sides in 1961–62; Dick and Ken Thornett played together in three test matches on the 1963–64 Kangaroo Tour.

== Bibliography ==
- Whiticker, Alan & Hudson, Glen (2006) The Encyclopedia of Rugby League Players, Gavin Allen Publishing, Sydney
- Andrews, Malcolm (2006) The ABC of Rugby League Austn Broadcasting Corpn, Sydney
