= John Williams (rugby union, born 1940) =

- Born: John Lewis Williams; 28 May 1940 (age 86) Sydney, New South Wales, Australia
- School: Newington College

Rugby union career
- Position: Wing
International career
Years	Team	Apps	(Points)
1963	Wallabies	3	(3)

John Lewis Williams (born 1940) is a former Australian rugby union player who represented the Wallabies three times.

== Early life ==
Williams was born on 28 May 1940 in Sydney and attended Newington College (1953–1958). Post-school he became a member of the Drummoyne District Rugby Football Club backline as a winger. He played in the only Drummoyne Grand Final team in 1961 and then switched to Randwick.

== Representative career ==
He played his test matches against South Africa in 1963 and "scored one of the most famous tries in international rugby" when he clinched the Australian victory 11–9 in Johannesburg. Williams claimed a total of three international rugby caps for Australia.
