= Ollie Waldron =

Irish rugby union player (1943–2026)

- Full name: Cornelius Oliver Waldron
- Born: 11 July 1943 Cork, Ireland
- Died: 18 August 2026 (aged 83) Schull, County Cork, Ireland
- University: University College Cork; University of Oxford

Rugby union career
- Position(s): Lock, prop
International career
Years	Team	Apps	(Points)
1966–1968	Ireland	3	(0)

Cornelius Oliver Waldron (11 July 1943 – 18 August 2026) was an Irish international rugby union player.

== Biography ==
Waldron was born in Cork, the third of four sons to parents Margaret O'Brien, from Kilbrittain, County Cork, and Irish Volunteer and Garda Síochána Sergeant Michael Waldron, from Ballyhaunis, County Mayo. He attended Glasheen Boys' School, and later graduated from University College Cork before undertaking postgraduate studies at Merton College, Oxford, where he completed a DPhil in nuclear physics.

A two-time Oxford blue, Waldron was the victim of a biting incident while playing for Oxford University against the touring Wallabies in 1966, leaving him bloodied. The injury required numerous stitches and was later revealed to have been caused by Wallaby hooker Ross Cullen, who was sent home by Australian team management. He also played for London Irish and was capped three times by Ireland, appearing twice in the 1966 Five Nations as a lock against Scotland and Wales at Lansdowne Road, then once against the Wallabies in a 1968 home international, this time used as a prop.

== Business career ==
A CEO of Tara Mines and chairman of Oliver Resources, Waldron was subsequently CEO of Dragon Oil.

During his time as CEO of Dragon Oil, Oliver Waldron identified and led the investment in the Cheleken Block, and oil producing zone of the South Caspian Sea, Turkmenistan in 1995. The team believed that the zone held massive quantities of hydrocarbons but had suffered chronic under investment and operating inefficiency. Initially, Dragon Oil purchased a 60% interest in LEA, a Dutch operator that was working with the Turkmen government to develop the resource since 1993. In 1996, Dragon bought out all of the remainder of LEA's interest and raised development funds through a share issue at 1.5 pence per share (equivalent to 37.5 pence after a 1 for 25 share consolidation in September 1997). The Production Sharing Agreement (PSA) that was negotiated and signed with the Government of Turkmenistan represented one of the first major foreign investments in the country since Turkmenistan's independence in 1991.

During the term of the PSA, Dragon Oil has produced over 468 million barrels of oil and increased daily production more than ten fold to reach 100k boe/d by June 2015. The field remains the principal producing asset for Dragon Oil.

Having been a shareholder since 1999, the Emirates National Oil Company (ENOC) took Dragon Oil private and delisted from the London Stock Exchange in 2015 when it offered minority shareholders 800 pence per share valuing the equity at £3.9bn.

Between Dragon Oil's capital raising in 1996 to ENOC's take private offer in 2015, the Dragon Oil share price rose from 37.5 pence to 800 pence, an increase of 21 fold representing a compound return of 17.5% per annum for shareholders. The FTSE 100 returned 2.9% per annum over that period.

== Family Life ==
Oliver Waldron married Margo (maiden name Horgan) on 17 September 1966. He died at home in Schull, County Cork, on 18 August 2026, at the age of 83. He is survived by his wife, Margo, and sons, Jonathan, Gavin, Jaimie, and Richard.

== See also ==
- List of Ireland national rugby union players
