= 1971 Australia rugby union tour of France =

Summary
P	W	D	L
Total
8	4	0	4
Test match
2	1	0	1
Opponent
P	W	D	L
France
2	1	0	1

The 1971 Australia rugby union tour of France was a series of eight matches played by the Australia national rugby union team (the "Wallabies") in France in November 1971. The Wallabies drew the series, winning the first test of the two against the France and losing the second. They also played six games against teams described as French Selections (or Regional XVs), of which they won three and lost three.

== The matches ==
Scores and results list Australia's points tally first.

Opposing Team	For	Against	Date	Venue	Status
French Selection	28	12	3 November 1971	Lille	Tour match
French Selection	9	16	6 November 1971	Limoges	Tour match
French Selection	6	7	11 November 1971	Strasbourg	Tour match
French Selection	12	3	14 November 1971	Grenoble	Tour Match
French Selection	20	9	17 November 1971	Toulon	Tour Match
France	13	11	20 November 1971	Toulouse	Test match
French Selection	13	25	24 November 1971	Bayonne	Tour Match
France	9	18	27 November 1971	Yves-du-Manoir, Colombes	Test match

== Squad leadership ==
The Wallaby squad was captained by Greg Davis described by Howell as "a leader of men who believed a leader should lead....a single minded flanker who gave no quarter and asked for none". Davis was making his sixth overseas tour with the Wallabies and his second as captain.

== Touring party ==
- Tour Manager: J French
- Coach : Bob Templeton
- Captain: Greg Davis
