= Al Moroney =

Irish rugby union player

- Full name: Thomas Aloysius Moroney
- Born: 27 July 1941 Kilmihil, Co. Clare, Ireland
- Died: 8 February 2012 (aged 70) Dublin, Ireland
- University: University College Dublin
- Occupation: General practitioner

Rugby union career
- Position: Prop
International career
Years	Team	Apps	(Points)
1964–67	Ireland	3	(0)

Thomas Aloysius Moroney (27 July 1941 – 8 February 2012) was an Irish international rugby union player.

== Biography ==
=== Rugby career ===
A prop, Moroney played his rugby with Ashbourne, Bective Rangers, London Irish and University College Dublin (UCD), while winning three Ireland caps. He debuted against Wales in the 1964 Five Nations and featured twice more in 1967, including a win over Australia at Lansdowne Road. His association with rugby at UCD continued after he graduated, serving as both coach and president of the club. He coached UCD to a Leinster Senior Cup title in 1977.

=== Personal life ===
Moroney was a general practitioner in Ashbourne, County Meath. In 2004, Moroney was found guilty of dangerous driving and sentenced to a nine-month jail term, having caused the death of an 18-year-old DIT student when his car veered into incoming traffic.

== See also ==
- List of Ireland national rugby union players
