= Michael Purcell =

- Born: Michael Peter Purcell; 6 September 1945 Brisbane, Australia
- Died: 5 January 2016 (aged 70)
- School: St Joseph's, Nudgee

Rugby union career
- Position: flanker
International career
Years	Team	Apps	(Points)
1966	Wallabies	3	(0)

Michael Peter Purcell (6 September 1945 – 5 January 2016) was an Australian rugby union player who represented his country. He was born in Brisbane.

Purcell, a flanker and lock, was born in Brisbane, Queensland and claimed a total of 3 international rugby caps for Australia. He died at the age of 70 in January 2016.
