= Roy Prosser =

Australia international rugby union player

- Born: Roydon Barnett Prosser; 18 February 1942 Manly, New South Wales, Australia
- Died: 13 August 2008 (aged 66) Brisbane, Queensland, Australia
- School: Newington College
- Notable relative: Cyril Towers (Father-in-law)

Rugby union career
- Position: Prop
Senior career
Years	Team	Apps	(Points)
- Northern Suburbs
International career
Years	Team	Apps	(Points)
1966–1972	Australia	25	

Roydon "Roy" Barnett Prosser (18 February 1942 – 13 August 2008) was an Australian Rugby Union player who represented for the Wallabies twenty-five times. Prosser was once Australia's most capped prop.

== Early life ==
Prosser was born in Sydney and attended Newington College (1949–1959) commencing as a preparatory school student in Wyvern House.

== Club Rugby ==
Prosser played a club record 220 first grade games for Northern Suburbs Rugby Club and was a member of our three premiership sides in the 1960s.

== Waratahs ==
He made his New South Wales debut in 1963, making 24 appearances for the Waratahs over the following ten seasons.

== Wallabies ==
Prosser played 25 Test matches: seven against South Africa, six against New Zealand, five against France, three against Ireland and one each against England, Scotland, Wales and Fiji. He made his Test debut in 1967 against England at Twickenham in a game the Wallabies won 23–11 and played in two tests of that 1966–67 Wallaby tour. His last Test was against Fiji in Suva in 1972 which the Wallabies won 21–19.
