= Alan Cardy =

Australian rugby footballer (died 2021)

Alan Michael Cardy
- Born: 19 September 1945 Sydney, Australia
- Died: 19 December 2021 (aged 76)
- Height: 6 ft 1 in (1.85 m)
- Weight: 14 st 1 lb (89.5 kg)
- School: Katoomba High School

Rugby union career
- Position: Wing
International career
Years	Team	Apps	(Points)
1966–1968	Australia	9	

Alan Cardy (19 September 1945 – 19 December 2021) was a representative of Australia in rugby union. As a young man he concentrated on track and field, winning the Australian Junior Championships discus throw in 1963, aged just seventeen. In 1965, he ran 22.0 seconds in the 220 yards to finish third at the Australian National Championships – one-tenth of a second ahead of Peter Norman, the future silver medallist in the 200 metres at the 1968 Summer Olympics.

Cardy did not play any rugby until 1963 in his final year at Katoomba High School, where he was school captain. He played a few games for the Blue Mountains Rugby Club during 1962 and 1963, and later joined Drummoyne in 1965.

Cardy switched to the other rugby code – rugby league in 1969. However, his wing-threequarters career never reached any great heights in rugby league after suffering a broken leg in the pre-season.

He died on 19 December 2021 at the age of 76, and was survived by his three children.

== Bibliography ==
- The Double Blue Jumper: History of Blue Mountains Rugby. 2005.
- The Encyclopedia Of Rugby League players (Alan Whiticker & Glen Hudson)
