= Ross Teitzel =

Australian rugby union international

- Full name: Ross Gordon Teitzel
- Born: 20 March 1946 (age 80) Brisbane, Australia
- Height: 193 cm (6 ft 4 in)
- Weight: 112 kg (247 lb)

Rugby union career
- Position: Lock
International career
Years	Team	Apps	(Points)
1966–67	Australia	7	(0)

Ross Gordon Teitzel (born 20 March 1946) is an Australian former rugby union international.

Teitzel was born in Brisbane, where he attended Anglican Church Grammar School. He played his rugby for the University of Queensland, where he was studying for his veterinary degree.

A muscular lock, Teitzel was capped seven times for the Wallabies and debuted on the 1966–67 tour of Britain, Ireland and France, with the team looking to add line-out strength. He featured in all five Test matches on the tour.

== See also ==
- List of Australia national rugby union players
