= Larry Newman (rugby union) =

Australian rugby union player (1902–1963)

- Born: Ernest William Newman; 16 April 1902 Sydney
- Died: 3 November 1963 (aged 47) Sydney
- School: Newington College

Rugby union career
- Position: Wing
International career
Years	Team	Apps	(Points)
1922	Wallabies	1	(3)

Ernest William "Larry" Newman (1902–1963) was a rugby union player who represented Australia.

== Biography ==
Newman was born in Marrickville, New South Wales, to Ernest and Lilly Newman, and he attended Newington College (1909–1921). In sport at Newington he played in the cricket 1st XI for six years, three as captain, and the rugby 1st XV for four years, two as captain. He was a member of the 1st rifle shooting for two years and the athletics team and won the Warry Cup as senior champion in 1921.

== Representative Rugby ==
He was a wing and claimed 1 international rugby cap for Australia.
