= Tony Miller (rugby union) =

Australia international rugby union player (1929-1988)

Tony "Slaggy" Miller
- Born: Anthony Robert Miller; April 28, 1929 Manly
- Died: April 6, 1988 (aged 58) Sydney

Rugby union career
Amateur team(s)
Years	Team	Apps	(Points)
- Manly RUFC
Provincial / State sides
Years	Team	Apps	(Points)
	NSW	100	
International career
Years	Team	Apps	(Points)
1952–1967	Australia	41	

Anthony Robert "Slaggy" Miller MBE, (April 28, 1929– April 6, 1988) was an Australian rugby union footballer and coach, A state and national representative second-row forward, he played forty-one Test matches for Australia in a representative career spanning sixteen seasons. His age at 38 years, 113 days at the time of his last Wallaby appearance stands as the Australian Test record for the oldest player. His club career spanned an extraordinary twenty-three years. He is an inductee to the Australian Rugby Union Hall of Fame.

Miller was born in Manly, New South Wales). His club rugby career was played with the Manly Rugby Club in Sydney. His international debut for Australia was against Fiji in 1952. His Test appearance against Scotland on the 1966–67 Australia rugby union tour of Britain, Ireland and France marked an Australian Test cap record at that time, of thirty-seven career appearances. After his long playing career ended he coached at the Manly club for four years before commencing a long coaching association with the Warringah Rugby Club.

== Published references ==
- Howell, Max (2005) Born to Lead – Wallaby Test Captains, Celebrity Books, Auckland NZ
- Zavos, Spiro (2000) The Golden Wallabies, Penguin, Victoria
