= Peter Glover (rugby union) =

England international rugby union player

- Full name: Peter Bernard Glover
- Born: 25 September 1945 York, Yorkshire, England
- Died: 12 March 2024 (aged 78)

Rugby union career
- Position: Wing
International career
Years	Team	Apps	(Points)
1967–71	England	3	(0)

Peter Bernard Glover (25 September 1945 – 12 March 2024) was an English rugby union international.

== Biography ==
Born in York, Glover was a winger who gained three England caps between 1967 and 1971. He made his international debut against the touring Australians at Twickenham in 1967, at the time playing his rugby union for the Royal Air Force and Yorkshire. Following a stint with Bedford, he became based at RAF Lyneham and while with Bath made two further England appearances in 1971. He played for Harrogate from 1972 to 1974. Glover died on 12 March 2024, at the age of 78.

== See also ==
- List of England national rugby union players
