= 1963 Australia rugby union tour of South Africa =

Summary
P	W	D	L
Total
20	13	1	6
Test match
4	2	0	2
Opponent
P	W	D	L
South Africa
4	2	0	2

The 1963 Australia rugby union tour of South Africa was a series of twenty matches played by the Australia national rugby union team between June and September 1963. The Wallabies tied the series with the Springboks winning two and losing two Tests.

The tour was one of the highlights of the successful "Thornett Era" of Australian Rugby, buoyed by the leadership skills of skipper John Thornett and the outstanding skills of greats of the game like Ken Catchpole, Peter Johnson and Rob Heming. Dick Marks and Peter Crittle also toured and would later become among the most influential administrators of Australian rugby.

== Matches ==
Scores and results list Australia's points tally first.

Opposing Team	For	Against	Date	Venue	Status
Eastern Transvaal	14	0	15 June 1963	PAM Brink Stadium, Springs	Tour Match
North Eastern Districts	9	8	18 June 1963	Danie Craven Rugby Stadium, Burgersdorp	Tour Match
Boland	30	13	22 June 1963	Boland Stadium, Wellington	Tour Match
Western Province Universities	9	11	26 June 1963	Newlands, Cape Town	Tour Match
Natal	13	14	29 June 1963	Kings Park Stadium, Durban	Tour Match
Rhodesia XV	22	11	2 July 1963	Kitwe, Zimbabwe	Tour Match
Rhodesia	12	5	6 July 1963	Salisbury, Zimbabwe	Tour Match
Transvaal	14	5	8 July 1963	Ellis Park Stadium, Johannesburg	Tour Match
South Africa	3	14	13 July 1963	Loftus Versfeld Stadium, Pretoria	Test Match
South Western Districts	16	11	17 July 1963	Van Riebeeck Ground, Mossel Bay	Tour Match
Griqualand West	14	6	20 July 1963	De Beers Stadium, Kimberley	Tour Match
Northern Transvaal	11	11	24 July 1963	Loftus Versfeld Stadium, Pretoria	Tour Match
Border	6	3	27 July 1963	BCE Stadium, East London	Tour Match
South West Africa	24	6	31 July 1963	South West Stadium, Windhoek	Tour Match
Western Transvaal	14	12	3 August 1963	Olën Park, Potchefstroom	Tour Match
Northern Universities	9	15	6 August 1963	Ellis Park Stadium, Johannesburg	Tour Match
South Africa	9	5	10 August 1963	Newlands Stadium, Cape Town	Test Match
Eastern Province	10	3	14 August 1963	Boet Erasmus Stadium, Port Elizabeth	Tour Match
Junior Springboks	5	12	17 August 1963	PAM Brink Stadium, Springs	Tour Match
Central Universities	28	11	20 August 1963	Free State Stadium, Bloemfontein	Tour Match
South Africa	11	9	24 August 1963	Ellis Park Stadium, Johannesburg	Test Match
Western Province	6	12	31 August 1963	Newlands, Cape Town	Tour Match
Orange Free State	8	14	2 September 1963	Free State Stadium, Bloemfontein	Tour Match
South Africa	6	22	7 September 1963	Boet Erasmus Stadium, Port Elizabeth	Test Match

== See also ==
- History of rugby union matches between Australia and South Africa
