= Graeme Macdougall =

- Born: Donald Graeme Macdougall; 25 January 1940 (age 86) Sydney, Australia
- School: Newington College
- Notable relative: Stuart Macdougall (brother)

Rugby union career
- Position: lock
International career
| Years | Team | Apps | (Points) |
| 1961 | Australia | 2 | (0) |
- Rugby league career

Playing information
- Position: Prop, Second-row
Club
| Years | Team | Pld | T | G | FG | P |
|---|---|---|---|---|---|---|
| 1964 | Balmain | 2 | 0 | 0 | 0 | 0 |

Graeme Donald Macdougall (born 25 January 1940) is a former Australian Rugby Union player who represented for the Wallabies twice.

== Early life and rugby career ==
Macdougall was born in Sydney and attended Newington College (1953–1958). He played 63 first grade games with St George.

He played in his first Test match against Fiji in Brisbane. He toured South Africa in 1961–62 and played in the first Test at Johannesburg. He was at that time the youngest ever forward chosen to make a Wallaby tour. His brother Stuart was also an Australian rugby union representative player.

== Rugby league career ==
In 1964, Macdougall turned to rugby league and played for the Balmain Tigers. A knee injury cut short his career and restricted him to just two appearances for Balmain in 1964.
