= Beres Ellwood =

Australian rugby union international

- Full name: Beresford John Ellwood
- Born: 24 July 1937 (age 89) Wagga Wagga, NSW, Australia

Rugby union career
- Position: Centre
International career
Years	Team	Apps	(Points)
1958–66	Australia	20	(29)

Beresford John Ellwood (born 24 July 1937) is an Australian former rugby union international.

== Biography ==
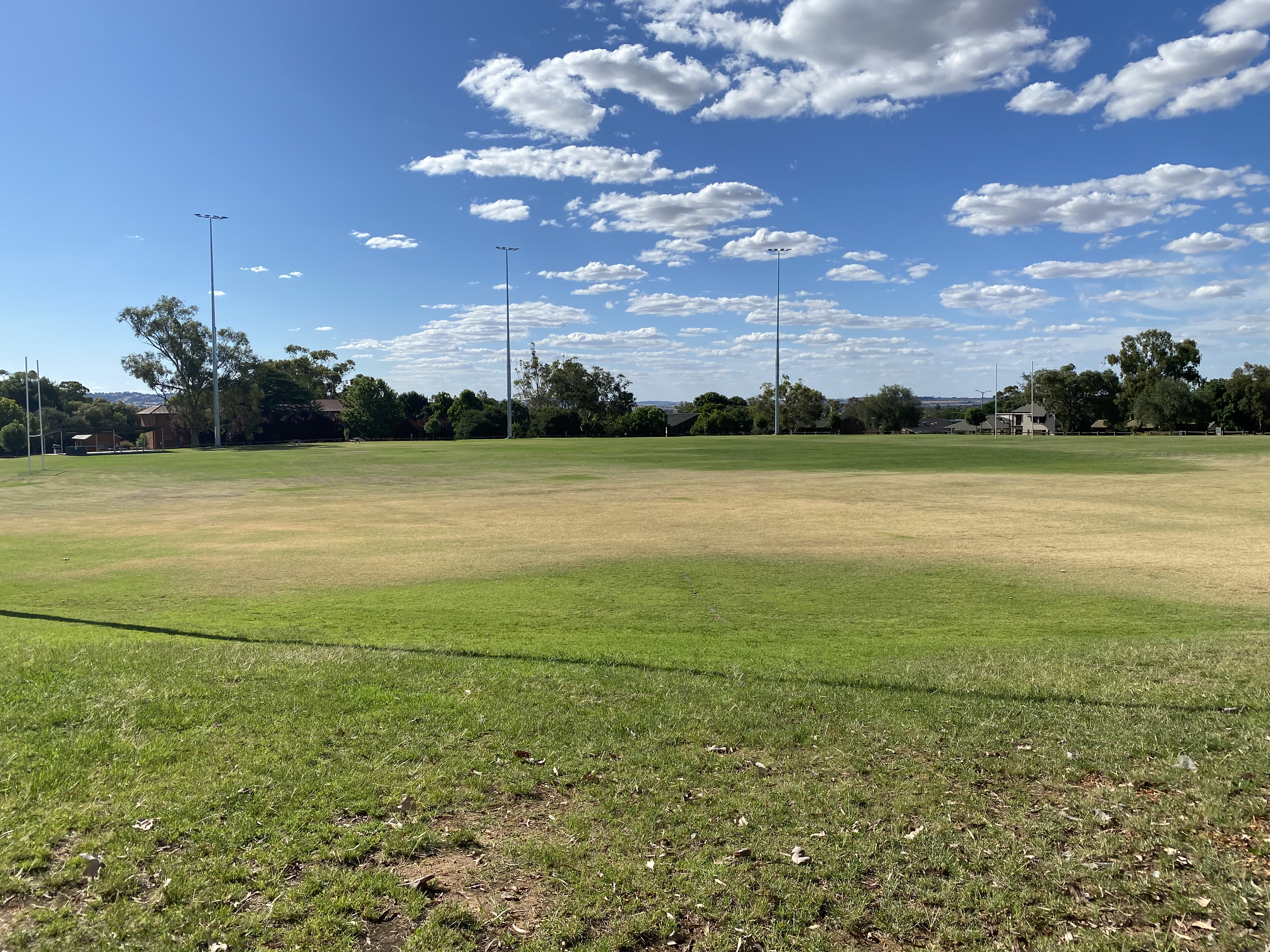
Beres Ellwood Oval

Raised in the Riverina region of New South Wales, Ellwood was born in Wagga Wagga and educated at Cootamundra High School, where he played rugby league. For his last year of school he went to Scots College in Sydney. On his return to Wagga Wagga, to attend agricultural college, he became a founding player for the Wagga Waratahs.

Ellwood, a centre, was capped 20 times for the Wallabies, debuting against the All Blacks on the 1958 tour of New Zealand. His goal-kicking abilities were used against the visiting 1965 Springboks and helped the Wallabies claim the 2nd Test to win the series. He bowed out of international rugby with an appearance against the British Lions in 1966.

Charles Sturt University's rugby oval is named after Ellwood.

=== Personal life ===
Ellwood is the father of former professional tennis players Annabel and Ben Ellwood.

== See also ==
- List of Australia national rugby union players
