= Phil Hawthorne =

Australian dual-code rugby player (1943–1994)

- Born: Phillip Francis Hawthorne; 24 October 1943 Newcastle, New South Wales, Australia
- Died: 18 September 1994 (aged 50) Newcastle, New South Wales, Australia
- School: Newcastle Boys High
- Occupation(s): Accountant, Real Estate

Rugby union career
- Position: Fly Half
Amateur team(s)
Years	Team	Apps	(Points)
1962–1966	Wanderers Newcastle		
1967	Randwick DRUFC		
Provincial / State sides
Years	Team	Apps	(Points)
1962–1967	New South Wales		
International career
Years	Team	Apps	(Points)
1962–1967	Australia	21	
- Rugby league career

Playing information
- Position: Five-eighth
Club
Years	Team	Pld	T	G	FG	P
1968–71	St George	56				126
1972	Easts	1				0
	Total	57	0	0	0	126
Representative
Years	Team	Pld	T	G	FG	P
1970	New South Wales	2				0
1970	Australia	3				6

Phillip Francis Hawthorne (24 October 1943 – 18 September 1994) was an Australian rugby league and rugby union footballer – a dual-code international. He represented the Wallabies in twenty-one Tests and the Kangaroos in three Tests. He captained Australia in rugby league the 3rd Test of the 1970 Ashes series. His mother was killed in a car accident in Newcastle when he was 14.

== Rugby union career ==
Hawthorne was born in 1943 in Newcastle, New South Wales. From the Wanderers Rugby Union Club in Newcastle, he first represented for the Wallabies age 18 as Fly-half. For the next five years he was a consistent selection for Wallaby Tests and tours and formed a formidable partnership with scrum-half Ken Catchpole.

On the 1966–67 Tour of England Hawthorne played in 5 Tests and set a new tour point scoring record of 26 points (6 field goals, 2 penalties and 2 conversions). In 1967, he joined Randwick to pair with Catchpole at club level and he played further Tests that year.

== Rugby league career ==
In 1968 Hawthorne accepted a then record $30,000 contract to switch to the professional code and join the St. George Dragons. He played fifty-six games for the Dragons from 1968 to 1971 at Five-eighth before he joined Eastern Suburbs for his final season in 1972.

In 1969 he appeared as a guest player for Auckland in a match against the New Zealand national rugby league team to mark the New Zealand Rugby League's diamond jubilee.

Phil Hawthorne's international rugby league debut against Great Britain in Brisbane on 6 June 1970 alongside John Brass saw them together become Australia's 32nd and 33rd dual code rugby internationals. He played all three Tests against Great Britain in 1970 and was captain in the 3rd Test with Langlands and Sattler injured and unavailable. He is named on the Australian Players Register as Kangaroo No. 441.

Injury restricted Hawthorne's appearances in 1971. He left the club at the end of that year to join the Eastern Suburbs Roosters but spent much of the 1972 season in reserve grade behind the competition's eventual player of the year, his former Wallaby teammate John Ballesty.

He moved to Coffs Harbour in 1973 and captain-coached Coffs Harbour to Group 2 premierships in 1973 and 1974. He was diagnosed with leukaemia in 1991, and died in September 1994, at the age of 50.

== Notable statistics ==
Hawthorne is remembered as a field-goal specialist with notable statistics including:

- 6 field goals in 5 Test matches on the 66-67 Wallaby Tour
- 18 field goals in 18 appearances with St George in 1968
- 12 field goals in 12 appearances with St George in 1969
- 3 field goals in his 3 Rugby League Tests in 1970.

Preceded by Graeme Langlands	Australian national rugby league captain 1970	Succeeded by Ron Coote
