= 1968 Australia rugby union tour of British Isles =

- Tour captain: Peter Johnson
Summary
| P | W | D | L |
Total
| 5 | 2 | 0 | 3 |
Test match
| 2 | 0 | 0 | 2 |
Opponent
| P | W | D | L |
Ireland
| 1 | 0 | 0 | 1 |
Scotland
| 1 | 0 | 0 | 1 |

The 1968 Australia rugby union tour of British Isles was a rugby union tour by the Australia national team of Ireland and Scotland. They played five matches, including two full internationals.

They arrived at Heathrow Airport on 15 October before flying on to Dublin. The opening match of the tour was against an Irish combined provinces team at Ravenill, Belfast, on 19 October. The combined provinces won 9-3. This was followed by a match against an Irish combined universities team in Cork on 23 October, which the Wallabies won 15-3.

The first test of the tour was against Ireland at Lansdowne Road, Dublin, on 26 October, which Ireland won 10-3. This was the first international match played under the "Australian dispensation law", which limited kicking to touch outside the 25 yard line.

They played a Scottish Districts team at Hughenden, Glasgow, on 30 October, winning 14-9. The second test, and final match, of the tour was a 3-9 defeat to Scotland at Murrayfield, Edinburgh, on 2 November.

== Matches ==
| 19 October 1968 | Irish Combined Provinces (Ireland) | 9-3 | Australia | Ravenhill, Belfast |
| | | Report |

| 23 October 1968 | Irish Combined Universities (Ireland) | 3-15 | Australia | Musgrave Park, Cork |
| | | Report |

| 26 October 1968 | Ireland | 10-3 | Australia | Lansdowne Road, Dublin |
| | | Report |

| 30 October 1968 | Scottish Districts (Scotland) | 9-14 | Australia | Hughenden, Glasgow |
| | | Report |

| 4 November 1968 | Scotland | 9-3 | Australia | Murrayfield, Edinburgh |
| | | Report |
