= Peter Crittle =

Australian rugby union player (1938–2024)

Charles Peter Crittle AO (21 July 1938 – 28 June 2024) was an Australian barrister, rugby union player and official. The majority of his secondary education was at Sydney Boys High School where he played in the First XV. Before then he was briefly at North Sydney Boys High School. As a lock, he made 15 test match appearances for the Australia national rugby union team from 1962–1967.

Crittle gave a great deal to Australian Rugby. He chaired the first national coaching panel in 1974 and then coached many young and up and coming players such as Mark and Glen Ella for the highly successful Sydney team in 1981 and 82 and Simon Poidevin for NSW (1982–83). He served as President of the New South Wales Rugby Union from 1993–99, and became President of the Australian Rugby Union in 2001. In 2004, he became an officer of the Order of Australia for his rugby achievements, and in 2005, he received the Vernon Pugh Award for Distinguished Service from the International Rugby Board.

Crittle died on 28 June 2024, at the age of 85.

== See also ==
- John Thornett
- Ken Catchpole
- Dick Marks
