= Bill McLaughlin =

Australian rugby union player and union officer

Reginald Edward Millen "Bill" McLaughlin MBE (1914–1990) was an Australian Rugby Union player and President of the Australian Rugby Union. He represented for the Wallabies twice and was later assistant manager and coach of the national side. He attended Newington College (1929–1930).

He was appointed Member of the Order of the British Empire (MBE) in the 1976 New Year Honours for services to sport.
