= Randwick DRUFC =

Australian rugby union club, based in Randwick, NSW

(Australia) Randwick DRUFC
- Full name: Randwick District Rugby Union Football Club
- Nickname(s): Galloping Greens, Wicks
- Founded: 1923; 103 years ago
- Location: Coogee, Sydney, Australia
- Ground: Coogee Oval (Capacity: 5,000)
- Coach: Stephen Hoiles
- Captain: Nick Wilkinson
- League: Shute Shield
Team kit

Official website
- randwickrugby.com.au

Randwick District Rugby Union Football Club (Randwich DRUFC), also known as the Galloping Greens, is an Australian rugby union club based in Randwick City Council, a Local Government Area in the Eastern Suburbs of Sydney.

Clubs known as Randwick FC were successful in Sydney rugby union competitions over the 1880s-90s era. The 1899 first grade Randwick FC was made defunct by the introduction of the district clubs scheme for all of Sydney the following year. The electorate of Randwick was included under area allocated to Eastern Suburbs DRUFC.

Under the district scheme model in 1914 the boundaries of the first grade district clubs were redrawn to allow for the introduction of a Randwick district club. However, there was no club competition during World War One and when resumed in 1919 no Randwick club took part.

A Randwick Club was entered into the 1921 second grade competition. After the bulk of the club's players in 1922 declined to take part in a proposed re-entry of the South Sydney DRUFC (1900-14), it sought and was granted entry into the first grade (now Shute Shield) in 1923 as the Randwick DRUFC. The Randwick DRUFC celebrated its 50th season jubilee (1923-73) in 1973.

The modern Randwick club is one of the traditional powerhouses of the Shute Shield competition, winning 29 titles (14 from 1978 to 1996).. Randwick's colours are myrtle green and the club's home ground is Coogee Oval.

In the 1980s the club produced many Australia national rugby union team members ("Wallabies"), including the Ella brothers. Its history has seen many of Australia's best players represent the club, including George Gregan, Rocky Elsom and David Campese. In all, 93 Randwick players have pulled on a Wallaby jersey, and nine have become national team captain.

== Titles ==
Premiership Titles: (29) 1930, 1934, 1938, 1940, 1948, 1959, 1965, 1966, 1967, 1971, 1973, 1974, 1978, 1979, 1980, 1981, 1982, 1984, 1987, 1988, 1989, 1990, 1991, 1992, 1994, 1996, 2000, 2004, 2023
Australian Club Champions: (6) 1982, 1983, 1988, 1989, 1991, 1997
Melrose Sevens: (1) 1990

== International representatives ==
- (Australia) Herb Barker
- (Australia) Kurtley Beale
- (Australia) John Brass
- (Australia) David Campese
- (Australia) Ken Catchpole
- (Australia) Roy Cawsey
- (Australia) Mark Chisholm
- (Australia) Gary Ella
- (Australia) Glen Ella
- (Australia) Mark Ella
- (Australia) Rocky Elsom
- (Australia) Ted Fahey
- (Australia) Russell Fairfax
- (Australia) Owen Finegan
- (Australia) John Flett
- (Australia) Adam Freier
- (Australia) George Gregan
- (Australia) Phil Hawthorne
- (Australia) Stephen Hoiles
- (Australia) Peter Johnson
- (Australia) Phil Kearns
- (Australia) David Knox
- (Australia) Chris Latham
- (Australia) Ewen McKenzie
- (Australia) Bruce Malouf
- (Australia) Wally Meagher
- (Australia) Drew Mitchell
- (Samoa) Fosi Pala'amo
- (Australia) Simon Poidevin
- (Australia) Tony Daly
- (Australia) Jeff Sayle
- (Australia) Nick Shehadie
- (Australia) Gordon Stone
- (Australia) Dick Tooth
- (Australia) Cyril Towers
- (Australia) Josh Valentine
- (Australia) Lloyd Walker
- (Australia) Warwick Waugh
- (Australia) Chris Whitaker
- (Australia) Col Windon
- (Australia) Matt Giteau
- (Australia) Ken Wright
- (Australia) Richard Thornett
- (Australia) Nick Cummins
- (Australia) Michael Cleary
- (Australia) Mac Ramsay

== Representative coaches ==
- Michael Cheika – Stade Français Paris head coach ('10–'12); Leinster coach ('05–'10); Petrarca Padova Coach ('99/'00); NSW Waratahs Coach ('13–'15); Australia Coach ('14–'19); Argentina Coach ('22–'present)
- Bob Dwyer – former coach of Australia, NSW, the Leicester Tigers and Bristol
- Gary Ella – Former NSW Assistant Coach; Former Australia A head coach; Former Leinster Coach
- (Australia) Glen Ella – Incumbent Fijian coach ('09- ); former Fijian Technical Advisor ('08–'09); Former Canadian Assistant Coach 2007, Australian Sevens Head Coach ('94–'95, '97, '99–'00, '05–'07), Australian Assistant coach ('94–'95, '00–'03), ACT Brumbies Technical Adviser ('98–'00) and England Assistant coach ('16- )
- (Australia) Owen Finegan – Incumbent Lineout Co-ordinator with the ACT Brumbies ('08-)
- Alan Gaffney – Incumbent Ireland Backs Coach, Leinster Assistant Coach & part-time Saracens consultant; Former Director of Rugby at Saracens ('06/'07 – '07/'08); former Munster ('02/'03–'04/'05) and Leinster ('00/'01 – '01/'02) Head Coach; former NSW (1997–99) and Australia ('05) Assistant Coach
- Eddie Jones – Coach of Suntory Sungoliath ('96 & '09-12); former Australian ('01–'05), ACT Brumbies ('98–'01), and Queensland Reds ('07) head coach; Springboks Technical Advisor 2007; former Director of Rugby at Saracens ('08–'09); Japan ('12–'15) head coach; England ('15–'21); Australia ('23–'present)
- (Australia) Ian Kennedy – former NSW and Australian U21 coach
- (Australia) David Knox – Former assistant Coach for Leinster ('05–'08), the ACT Brumbies ('96–'98), Petrarca Padova ('99/'00), and South Sydney in the National Rugby League ('03)
- (Australia) Tim Lane – Incumbent Georgian head coach ('08–'10); former Italian head coach; Australian Assistant coach ('98–'99); Springboks assistant coach ('01–'03); former head coach of Clermont Auvergne ('00–'01); the Johannesburg Cats ('03-?); Ricoh Black Rams; CA Brive; and Toulon ('07-?)
- (Australia) Todd Louden – Head Coach of Ricoh Black Rams; Former attacking coach for NSW ('08) and the Bulls ('07); Randwick ('06); NSW Coach of the Year 2006
- Ewen McKenzie – Head Coach of Australia ('13–'14); Queensland Reds coach ('09- 13); former Stade Français Paris head coach ('08–'09), NSW head coach ('04–'08) & Australian Assistant coach
- Jayson Brewer – Assistant Coach Fiji National Team (‘16-‘17) & ARU High Performance Coach, Sydney Rays National Rugby Championship – Forwards Coach, ('17), Randwick 1st Grade Defence and Senior Coach (2013-2016) Australian Barbarians Coach (2016)

== Other personnel ==
Statistician: Ray Jennings
Historian & Archivist: Bob Outterside

== Nearby clubs ==
- Eastern Suburbs RUFC
- Waverley Rugby Club
- Colleagues Rugby Club
- Alexandria Dukes Rugby Football Club
