= John Thornett =

Australian rugby union player (1935–2019)

John Thornett MBE
- Born: John Edward Thornett; 30 March 1935 Paddington
- Died: 4 January 2019 (aged 83) Batemans Bay, New South Wales
- School: Sydney Boys High School
- Notable relative(s): Dick Thornett (brother); Ken Thornett (brother)

Rugby union career
- Position(s): Flanker, 2nd row, front row
Amateur team(s)
Years	Team	Apps	(Points)
- Sydney University Football Club
–	Northern Suburbs		
Provincial / State sides
Years	Team	Apps	(Points)
1955–66	NSW	21	
International career
Years	Team	Apps	(Points)
1955–1967	Australia	37	(3)

John Edward Thornett, MBE (30 March 1935 – 4 January 2019) was an Australian rugby union player, who played 37 Tests for Australia between 1955 and 1967 and made an additional 77 representative match appearances. He captained Australia in 16 Test matches and on an additional 47 tour matches on the eight international rugby tours he made with Wallaby squads.

== Early life and sporting family ==
Thornett was born in Sydney, and educated at Sydney Boys High School, graduating in 1951, where he was school Captain, a champion swimmer, rowed in the 1st VIII, and captained the rugby 1st XV alongside another champion swimmer and rugby great, Colin Smee. His brothers Dick and Ken were also champion sportsmen and all three brothers played water polo for the Bronte Water Polo Club. John represented New South Wales at water polo in the mid to late 1950s while Dick went on to represent Australia at the Olympics in water polo. Dick was a triple-international also representing Australia in both rugby codes while Ken represented nationally at rugby league.

== Water Polo career ==
Thornett also competed for Bronte Swimming Club before being coaxed into playing water polo for the newly formed Bronte Amateur Water Polo Club in season 1951/52. Representing Bronte, John was selected at the age of 18 in the NSW State water polo team in 1954 where he competed at the Australian Water Polo Championships in Sydney. Thornett also represented NSW on three other occasions at the Australian Water Polo Championships in Melbourne (1955), Perth (1959) and Melbourne (1960). He was a member of Bronte’s inaugural 1st Grade water polo winning team in the NSWAWPA Premiership season of 1958/59, which they repeated again in 1959/60, 1960/61 and 1961/62. Thornett was also actively involved with the NSWAWPA where he worked as Hon. Registrar and Treasurer, but despite focusing on rugby union John remained a loyal and active club member with Bronte AWPC until 1970.

In 1983, Thornett was made a life member of Water Polo NSW.

== Rugby career ==
John Thornett's club rugby was played with both Sydney University and the Northern Suburbs Rugby Club. In 1954 he toured with the Australian Universities team to New Zealand. In 1955 he first played for New South Wales. That same year he made his representative debut for Australia touring to New Zealand and playing in all three Tests. The following year he again toured with the Australian Universities side, going to Japan.

In 1956 he appeared for the Waratahs against the visiting Springboks and also played in both Tests. He made the 1957–58 Australia rugby union tour of Britain, Ireland and France and played in four of the five Tests. In 1958 he made his second tour of New Zealand for two test appearances including an unexpected victory in the 2nd Test in Christchurch. He made further Test appearances in 1959 (twice against the British Lions) and in 1962 (twice against Fiji). On the 1961 tour of South Africa captained by Ken Catchpole, Thornett played in both tests and made his debut as Australian captain in a tour match against South-West Africa where a draw was achieved.

From 1963 to 1967 Thornett was entrenched as Australia's leader captaining the Wallabies more times than any player to that point in Australia's rugby history. By this point in his career and with his pace slowing, Thornett had moved from flanker to second-row and then settled into the front-row. He captained the Wallabies on the 1962 tour of New Zealand playing in all three Tests and in 11 of the total 13 matches. In 1963 he captained Australia to an 18–9 victory in a one-off Test at the Sydney Cricket Ground against England. Then in 1963 he led the Wallabies on a 24 match tour of South Africa, playing in 16 of the matches including the drawn four Test match series – a highlight of Australia's dour international record over the 50s and 60s. He played in all eight matches of the 1964 tour to New Zealand, including three Tests and then in 1965 he led New South Wales and Australia (twice) to victory over the visiting Springboks, followed the next year by matches at home against the British Lions.

Thornett's rugby career concluded at the end of the 1966–67 Australia rugby union tour of Britain, Ireland and France which he captained. A case of impetigo affected his form and he selected himself out of contention for the four Tests against the Home Nations but played in the final Test against the French at Stade Colombes before making a fitting ceremonial farewell match against the Barbarians. All told Thornett played 114 matches for Australia, 37 of them Test matches. He went on eight overseas tours with the Wallabies and on four of those (1962,1963,1964 & 1967) he was the squad and Test leader. He captained his country in 16 Tests and 47 other matches.

== Reputation ==
Max Howell quotes Thornett whose writings were published in The World of Rugby (1967), "Above all, rugby is an amateur game played by men who should always stand for the highest standards of sportsmanship. By amateur I do not mean that rugby players are not paid for playing the game. There is far more to being an amateur than the money factor. The amateur spirit to me is a state of mind about how you approach a match in the field". Bill McLaughlin described Thornett in that same publication, "He is quiet by nature, but a very staunch character with the vision to see beyond Sydney football grounds and take in the overall international picture in rugby. I doubt if he has ever failed to do anything asked of him if he thought it would help rugby – and these demands have been considerable."

Howell acclaims Thornett as arguably the greatest captain Australia ever had and describes him thus "His players followed him because they knew he had the experience, and that he was a man of sterling character and high ethics.He was rarely the most brilliant man on the team, but rather the essential cog in the machine. Men followed him into battle because he was solid, dependable, unwavering, a man of undoubted modesty and tangible principles. They all knew he was a fine human being."

== Accolades ==
Thornett was the second Australian player, after Nicholas Shehadie, to play 100 games for his country. He was made a Member of the Order of the British Empire (MBE) in the 1966 New Year Honours "for services to Rugby Union football in the State of New South Wales", and inducted into the Sport Australia Hall of Fame in 1985. He received an Australian Sports Medal in 2000. In 2005 he was honoured as one of the inaugural five inductees into the Australian Rugby Union Hall of Fame. Upon his induction the Australian Rugby Union president, Paul McLean, referred to Thornett's name as: "synonymous with Australian pride and great leadership". Thornett was additionally honoured by the International Rugby Board in 2013 with induction into the IRB Hall of Fame. His portrait hangs in the offices of the Australian Rugby Union.

Thornett died on 4 January 2019 at a nursing home in Batemans Bay with his wife, Vivienne, by his side.

== Published sources ==
- Howell, Max (2005) Born to Lead – Wallaby Test Captains, Celebrity Books, Auckland NZ

Preceded by Jim Lenehan	Australian national rugby union captain 1963–1967	Succeeded by Greg Davis
