= Ken Catchpole =

Australia international rugby union player (1939–2017)

Ken Catchpole OAM
- Born: Kenneth William Catchpole; 21 June 1939 Paddington, New South Wales, Australia
- Died: 21 December 2017 (aged 78) Sydney, Australia
- School: The Scots College
- University: Sydney University
- Notable relative: Mark Catchpole (son)

Rugby union career
- Position: Scrum-half
Amateur team(s)
Years	Team	Apps	(Points)
- Randwick DRUFC
Provincial / State sides
Years	Team	Apps	(Points)
1959–68	NSW	26	
International career
Years	Team	Apps	(Points)
1961–1968	Australia	27	(9)

Kenneth William Catchpole OAM (21 June 1939 – 21 December 2017) was an Australian rugby union footballer. A state and national representative half-back, he played twenty-seven matches for Australia, thirteen as captain. Catchpole rose through the ranks at the Randwick club as a young man, before making his debut for New South Wales at only 19 years of age, then captaining Australia at age 21. He is considered one of Australia's greatest rugby scrumhalves.

== Early life ==
Born in Paddington, New South Wales Catchpole was schooled initially at Randwick Primary School before moving to Coogee Preparatory School. He excelled at sports and participated in rugby, swimming, tennis and boxing. From Coogee Prep he won an academic scholarship to The Scots College for his high school years. His rugby prowess saw him play in the Scots First XV for three of his senior years. He won selection for the GPS 3rds in his first senior year, then in the GPS 1sts in his two remaining years. He gained entrance to Sydney University to study science.

== Rugby career ==
He was lured to his local Randwick DRUFC ahead of the Sydney Uni Rugby Club and debuted in 1958, aged eighteen in the under 21s. The following season he cemented a first grade spot and after just a few games he made his state representative debut for New South Wales against the touring British Lions. He played alongside Arthur Summons in the halves, scoring a try to help New South Wales to an upset 18–14 win over the tourists to mark his state debut. The following year at age twenty he captained New South Wales in matches against the visiting All Blacks.

In 1961 Catchpole made his Test debut as captain, leading the Wallabies to victory over Fiji in a three-game series. That same year, he captained Australia, on a tour to South Africa including two Tests and then in a Test at home against France. In 1963 he again toured to South Africa playing in all three Tests under John Thornett as captain.

Playing at scrum-half, partnered with Phil Hawthorne at fly-half, the pair became one of rugby's most famous duos. Catchpole played South Africa in Australia in 1965, where the Wallabies won both tests in a two-game series over the Springboks. He also toured the United Kingdom in 1966 and 1967, captaining Australia to victory in Tests against England and Wales. He was also captain for the Tests against Scotland and Ireland and in a number of other tour matches. After the win against England the President of the English Rugby Union, Duggie Harrison described him as "the greatest halfback of all time".

Following his return from the tour he captained Australia, New South Wales and Sydney in matches against a touring Irish side in 1967. He was honoured with the Australian captaincy later that year in the 75th Jubilee Test played to mark the anniversary of the New Zealand Rugby Union. The following year he was selected as captain again for a two test series against the All Blacks. In the first of those Tests in 1968 he suffered a career-ending injury when Colin "Pinetree" Meads grabbed and wrenched Catchpole's leg while he was pinned under other players in a ruck, tearing his hamstring off the bone, and severely rupturing his groin muscles. He was aged twenty-eight and his rugby career was finished.

== Accolades ==
In January 2001 Catchpole was awarded the Centenary Medal, "For service to Australian society through the sport of rugby union" and the Australian Sports Medal "For services to rugby union". In the 2001 Australia Day Honours, he was awarded the Medal of the Order of Australia (OAM) "For service to Rugby Union football, and to the community."

In 2004 Catchpole was inducted onto the Museum of Rugby Wall of Fame. A plaque in the Walk of Honour at the Sydney Cricket Ground commemorates his career and a statue at the Sydney Football Stadium immortalises Catchpole. The Shute Shield Player of the Year Medal is named in honour of Catchpole. In 2005 he was honoured as one of the inaugural five inductees into the Australian Rugby Union Hall of Fame. Upon his induction Australian Rugby Union President Paul McLean referred to Catchpole as: "exuding grace and majesty". He was inducted into the Sport Australia Hall of Fame in 1985 and the IRB Hall of Fame in 2013.

Former All Black scrum-half Chris Laidlaw, whose rugby contemporaries included Welsh rugby great Gareth Edwards and Sid Going, in his 1973 autobiography Mud in Your Eye, wrote that:

Ken Catchpole has been the outstanding scrumhalf of the last decade. Others have made contributions to techniques in passing, kicking, and running, but as the supreme exponent of all the skills Catchpole stands beyond rivalry. Not only was he quicker of thought, action and reaction, but a judicious kicker and more subtle runner than either Going or Edwards ... Catchpole was ... years ahead of his time. His pass was never long - he considered that a waste of time. It was, however, phenomenally fast and his technique of delivery perfect. No elegant dive pass, no laboured swivel to avoid passing off the weak arm - just a flash of light to his flyhalf.

Bob Dwyer, former Australian rugby coach, in his first autobiography The Winning Way, rated Ken Catchpole as one of the five most accomplished Australian rugby players he had ever seen, citing him as the best in terms of "all-round ability..."

In 2013 Australian sports magazine Inside Rugby named its four Australian Invincibles – a rugby union equivalent of rugby league's Immortals. Ken Catchpole was named alongside Col Windon, Mark Ella and David Campese as the first Invincibles of Australian rugby.

== Personal life ==
Catchpole died in Sydney at the age of 78 on the night of 21 December 2017 after a long battle with an illness.

== Published references ==
- Howell, Max (2005) Born to Lead – Wallaby Test Captains, Celebrity Books, Auckland NZ
- Zavos, Spiro (2000) The Golden Wallabies, Penguin, Victoria
- Meares, Peter; Howell, Maxwell (2005). Wallaby Legends. Thomas C. Lothian. ISBN 0-7344-0837-4.
- Dwyer, Bob (1992). The Winning Way. Rugby Press. ISBN 0-908630-41-7.

== Footnotes ==
Preceded by Peter Fenwicke	Australian national rugby union captain 1961–1968	Succeeded by Peter Johnson
