= Rugby union in Victoria =

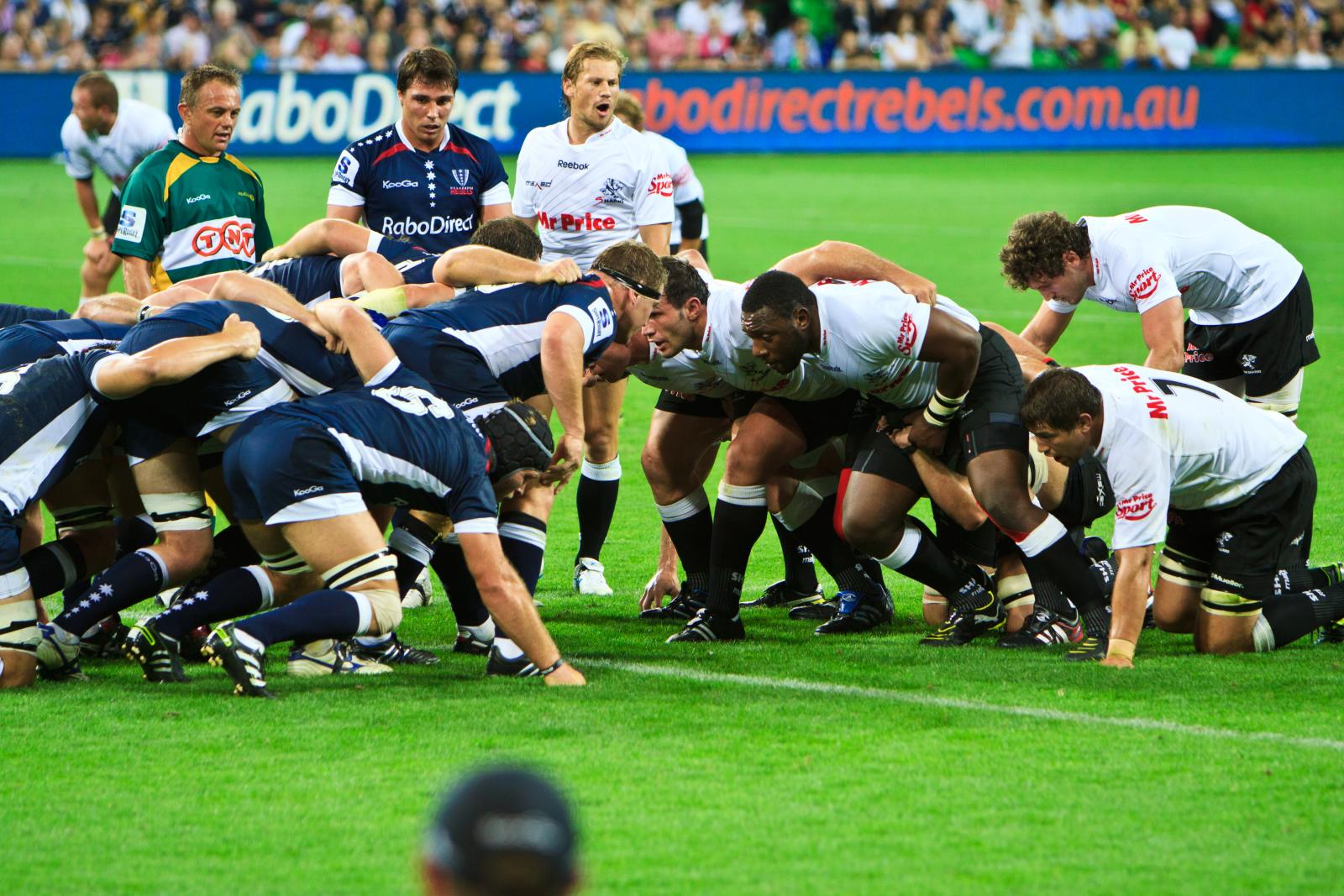
- Melbourne Rebels versus Sharks, 2011
- Governing body: Rugby Victoria
- State team: Melbourne Rebels
- First played: 1878, Melbourne
- Registered players: 11,792 (2022)
- Clubs: 26

Club competitions
- Dewar Shield

Audience records
- Single match: 90,119 (1997). Bledisloe Cup - Australia vs New Zealand (MCG, Melbourne)

Rugby union in Victoria describes the sport of rugby union being played and watched in the state of Victoria in Australia. The code was first introduced some time between the 1850s and 1880s but remained a minor sport played primarily in the private schools and amongst interstate expats. This has changed, particularly since the professionalisation of the game in the mid 1990s.

Player numbers are healthy for a sport in perhaps the most crowded football code marketplace on earth. Rugby Victoria counts participation across all variations of the game including 15-a-side Rugby, Sevens Rugby, VIVA 7s and Game-On primary school development program and claims that the game has grown by 38 per cent in 2016 to 15,829 participants. However Ausplay shows a decline of the sport in Victoria and with 11,792 registered players in 2022 trails behind Rugby union in Western Australia.

There are over 25 Rugby clubs in Victoria at any one time, with age group and community rugby forming the largest portion. The top tier of clubs consisting of a mix of amateurs and professionally contracted players aligned with the Melbourne Rebels compete for the Dewar Shield.

Victoria has produced over 30 Wallabies and many more Super Rugby and Professional players and age group Australian players as well as internationals for a number of pacific island nations.

International rugby matches are popular with spectators in Victoria. This is evidenced by the large crowds which attended matches at the 2003 Rugby World Cup, 2006 Commonwealth Games, England v Australia game (2016) and overall television ratings for blockbuster internationals.

From 2011 to 2024, Victoria was represented in the professional Super Rugby competition by the Melbourne Rebels.

== History ==
Writer Sean Fagan claims that Rugby football was first played in Victoria in the late 1840s and into the 1850s. While it is not known specifically which rules they played, the earliest recorded football clubs in Victoria, St Kilda Football Club (1858), South Yarra (1858), Scotch College, Melbourne, Melbourne Grammar and St Kilda Grammar did not originally play Australian rules football and are believed to have played English school games, quite possibly rugby. However, dissatisfaction with a lack of uniform rules and how the game was played led to the Melbourne FC in May 1859 adopting its own revised laws of football which was later to become known as Australian rules football. With the rapid rise in popularity of Australian rules football in Victoria, rugby quickly became a minority sport.

During the 1870s, Victorian clubs Albert Park and South Melbourne continued to experiment with rugby football rules. In May 1874, Albert Park, South Melbourne, and others had advocated strongly for their widespread adoption in Victoria, however this did not meet favour with the more powerful clubs in the colony and the premier football matches, the Challenge Cup effectively banned use of the rugby rules by competing clubs.

Early intercolonials between Victoria and New South Wales were played in alternating codes. During the 1877 match between Waratah and Carlton, Victorian superstar George Coulthard switched codes and joined the Waratahs to play rugby in Sydney. He quickly dominated at the sport, scoring all five goals and four tries in his second and last game for the club. Although he appeared in only two of the Waratahs' twelve rugby matches in 1877, Coulthard scored more goals than any other member that season, and tied equal first in tries. Coulthard's effort in "[showing] the Rugby men how their game should be played" damaged the reputation of the rugby code in Victoria for decades.

Club rugby was established in Victoria when the Melbourne Rugby Union (MRU) was formed in 1888. The touring 1888 British team played matches in Victoria, as did the 1888–89 New Zealand Native team, and both teams switched between rugby and Victorian rules (Australian rules football).

Victorian rugby went into recess between 1890 due to a lack of players. However competition restarted in 1893.

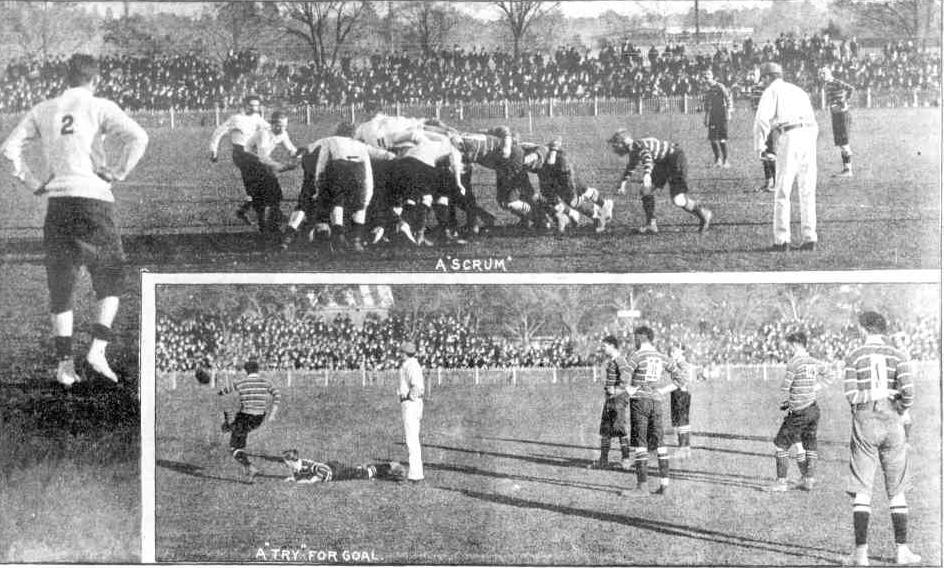
Victoria vs England on the MCG in 1899

Victoria first played rugby football against New South Wales in Melbourne in 1894 and sent its first team to play in Sydney in 1895 but after 1889 the game more or less disappeared in the state except for the match played in Melbourne in 1899 against Great Britain in which the tourists defeated the Victorians 30-0.

A Victorian Rugby Union (VRU) was restored in 1908 as arrangements were being made for a Victorian team to play the first Wallabies in Melbourne just prior to their departure for Great Britain.

The next year, 1909 saw the first presentation of the Dewar Shield, an award for first grade premiership teams still retained. The clubs competing for the inaugural shield were the Melbourne Rugby Union Football Club and Melbourne University Rugby Football Club (both laying claim to being the oldest in Victoria), East Melbourne, South Melbourne.

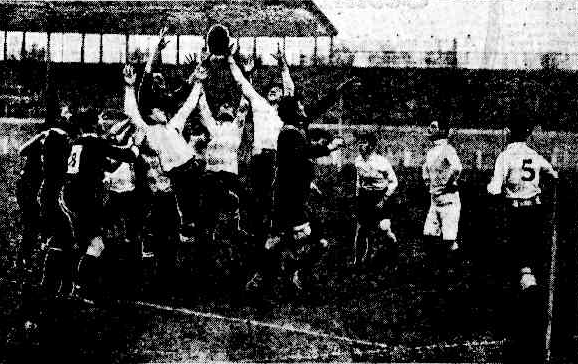
Victoria and Kings School Paramatta contest a line-out on the MCG 1913

Competition lapsed on commencement of the First World War and was not revived until 1926 when five League clubs decided to convert to Union and form the current VRU. During the following twelve years, up until the Second World War, Victoria played thirty matches against international and interstate teams and produced thirteen Wallabies. Club and representative competition did not resume again until 1946.

The first schoolboys match in Victoria was played in 1932 between Scotch College and Melbourne Grammar.

Melbourne was selected as a venue for the 2003 Rugby World Cup including finals. The attendances were significant, with the highlights being 50,647 seeing Australia defeat Ireland and 50,647 for England versus Samoa.

Following the success of the Rugby World Cup, in 2004, the Victorian Rugby Union made a bid for a Super Rugby rugby union franchise. The bid had support from backers including the Victorian Government. However it was rejected by the Australian Rugby Union for a team in Perth which became the Western Force.

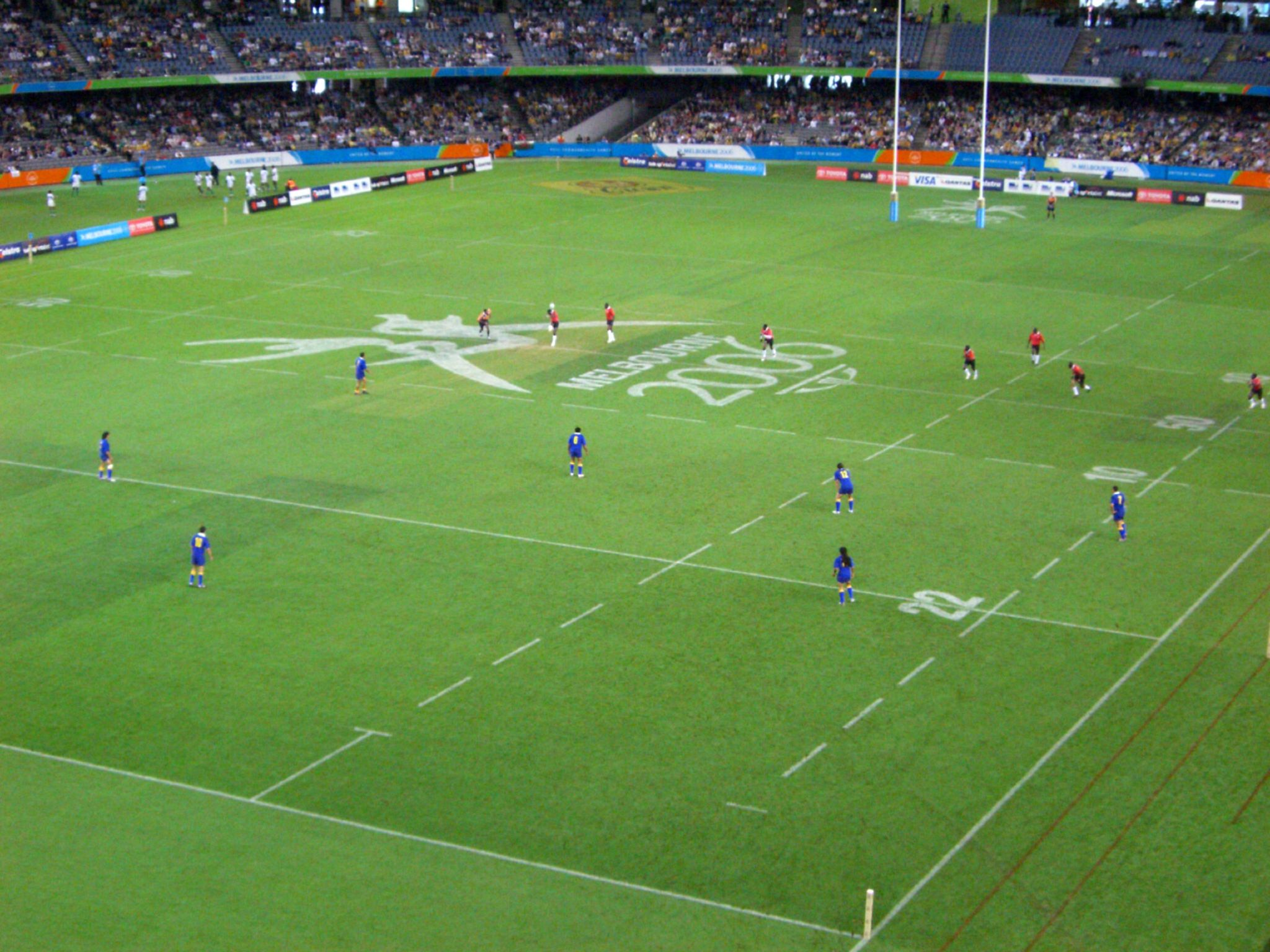
Rugby sevens being played at the 2006 Commonwealth Games, which was held at Melbourne's Docklands Stadium.

Melbourne hosted the 2006 Commonwealth Games, which included a component of Rugby Sevens, of which all of the matches were sold out. Melbourne holds the current record attendance for Rugby Sevens.

The inaugural Australian Rugby Championship started August 2007, including eight teams, one of which based in Melbourne, Victoria. It was rumoured that the New South Wales Rugby Union (NSWRU) gave up a fourth club to enable Victoria to participate in the new national competition. and the Melbourne Rebels were created and played out of Olympic Park Stadium. Despite having one of the larger crowd averages in the competition, they finished their first season with a home crowd average of just 3,305 and the league folded with losses in the millions, with the ARU openly blaming the Victorian franchise's larger costs of operation for the failure. The move was a great setback for the Victorian Rugby Union.

On 5 January 2010, it was announced by the Australian Rugby Union that it had awarded control of the new Melbourne Super Rugby team to the Melbourne Rebels consortium and that Melbourne would join the game's elite when the world's premier provincial competition expanded to 15 teams in 2011. The Melbourne Rebels played their first match of Super Rugby at AAMI Park against the NSW Waratahs on 18 February 2011, losing 43-0. The team only had to wait another week before registering their first victory, claiming a thrilling 25-24 win against the ACT Brumbies at AAMI Park in Round 2.

On 24 March 2014, the ARU officially announced a new professional national competition, the National Rugby Championship. The inaugural season started in August 2014. Victoria is represented by the Melbourne Rising, which plays out of AAMI Park.

== Governing body ==
Known as the Victorian Rugby Union until late 2017, the governing body for rugby union in the state of Victoria is now Rugby Victoria. Victoria is a founding member of the national governing body, Rugby Australia.

== Schools ==
1st Division	2nd Division
St Kevins, Melbourne Grammar School, Scotch College, Xavier College, Trinity Grammar, Geelong Grammar, Brighton Grammar, Marcellin College, St Patrick's Ballarat, Ivanhoe Grammar, Carey Grammar, Mentone Grammar, Melbourne High, Haileybury College

== Clubs ==
Dewar Shield	Premiership	Premiership Reserves	Championship	Lindroth Cup (Women's)	Wheelchair	Vic Masters (Over 35s)
Box Hill, Harlequins, Melbourne, Melbourne University, Moorabbin, Power House, Footscray, Endeavour Hills, Kiwi Hawthorn.	Eltham, Geelong, Northern Panthers, Brimbank, Wyndham City Rhinos	Cerebus, Melbourne, Northern Panthers, Eltham, Melbourne Chargers, Eltham, Wyndham City Rhinos	Bendigo, Ballarat, Monash Uni, Maroondah, Melton, Power House 4th Grade, Shepparton.	Melbourne, Northern Panthers, Casey, Western Districts, Melbourne Uni, Powerhouse	Box Hill, Melbourne, Harlequins, Power House.	Melbourne, Box Hill, Melbourne Uni, Power House, Southern Districts, Harlequins, Barbarians, Maroondah, Bayside Masters.

These clubs in turn feed the Victorian state representative team, The Victorian Country (pre 2008), the Rebel Rising, a joint program between the Victorian Rugby Union and the Melbourne Rebels established in 2011.

== Notable players ==
Victoria has produced a number of top-level rugby players including

- Rob Valetini
- Rob Leota
- Ashley Marsters
- Sir Edward 'Weary' Dunlop
- Pete Samu (Victoria, Crusaders and Brumbies)
- Tetera Faulkner (Victoria, Western Force, Rebels, Waratahs and Wallabies)
- Silvia Silvia (Victoria, Western Force, Brumbies and Rebels)
- Sammey Ikihega (Victoria, Niue Rugby Union)
- Jordan Uelese (Rebels and Wallabies)
- Digby Ioane (Queensland Reds and Wallabies)
- Rocky Elsom (ACT Brumbies and Wallabies)
- Hunter Paisami (Queensland Reds and Wallabies)
- Lloyd Johansson (Victoria, Queensland Reds, Melbourne Rebels and Wallabies)
- Vitori Buatava (Victoria, Western Force)
- Tala Gray (Victoria, Brumbies, Waratahs and Biarritz)
- Tamaiti Horua (Victoria, Western Force)
- Tom McVerry (Queensland Reds)
- Ole Avei (Queensland Reds)
- Ben Tapuai (Queensland Reds, Wallabies)
- Rex Tapuai
- John Ulugia (Victoria, Brumbies, Waratahs and Clermont)
- Christian Leali'ifano (Victoria, Brumbies, Wallabies, Toyota)
- David Palavi (ACT Brumbies)
- David Fitter (London Irish RFC, ACT Brumbies, Western Force, and Wallabies)
- Marc L'Huillier (Victoria and USA)
- Nick Stiles (Queensland Reds and Wallabies)
- Andrew Heath (Victoria, Australia U21s, NSW Waratahs, Queensland Reds, Wallabies, Beziérs FRA, Wellington Lions)
- Ewen McKenzie (Wallabies, and Super Rugby-winning coach of the Queensland Reds).
- Doug Osborne Victoria and Wallabies 1975
- John Meadows Victoria and Wallabies 1974-83
- Russ Tulloch Victoria and Wallabies 1966-67
- Dick Webb Victoria and Wallabies 1966-67
- Paul Gibbs Victoria and Wallabies 1966
- David Shepherd Victoria and Wallabies 1964-66
- Jim Douglas Victoria and Wallabies 1962
- Adrian 'Art' Turnbull Victoria and Wallabies 1961
- John Cocks Victoria and Wallabies 1958-59
- Danny Kay Victoria and Wallabies 1958-59
- Geoffrey Vaughan Victoria and Wallabies 1957-58
- Frank Magee Victoria and Wallabies 1953
- Warren Wakefield Victoria and Wallabies 1951
- Ernest Hills Victoria and Wallabies 1950
- Eric Davis Victoria and Wallabies 1947-49
- G Gourlay Victoria and Wallabies 1946
- George Pearson Victoria and Wallabies (tour abandoned 1939)
- Stan Bissett Victoria and Wallabies (tour abandoned 1939)
- Andrew Barr Victoria and Wallabies (tour abandoned 1939)
- Max Carpenter Victoria and Wallabies 1938
- Frederick Kerr Victoria and Wallabies 1938
- Clifford Lang Victoria and Wallabies 1938
- John Hammon Victoria and Wallabies 1937
- Ru Dorr Victoria and Wallabies 1936-37
- Ewan Jessep Victoria and Wallabies 1934
- Dave Cowper Victoria and Wallabies, Wallaby Captain in South Africa 1933
- Owen Bridle Victoria and Wallabies 1931-36
- Reg Lane Victoria and Wallabies, Victorian Captain mid–1920s
- Gordon Sturtridge Victoria and Wallabies 1929-33

== Notable coaches ==
Victoria has had a number of outstanding and successful rugby coaches including

- Bruce Norton (Coached schoolboy, under age and seniors rugby for Victoria over three decades)
- John McKee (rugby union coach) (Coached seniors rugby at Harlequins and for Victoria before taking up senior coaching roles interstate & internationally)
- Mark Robinson (Coached seniors rugby at club Kiwi Hawthorn and Victoria senior Axemen coach in the Australian Rugby Shield runner up to ACT 2006 winners 2007 against South Australia)

== Crowd Statistics ==
=== Major test matches and attendance 1997-2003 ===
Year	Opponent	Venue (Capacity)	Attendance	Notes
1997	All Blacks	MCG (100,000)	90,119	Bledisloe Cup / Tri Nations
1998	All Blacks	MCG, (100,000)	75,147	Bledisloe Cup / Tri Nations
2000	South Africa	Docklands (56,347)	34,045	Mandela Plate
2001	British & Irish Lions	Docklands (56,347)	56,605	
2002	France	Docklands (56,347)	37,482	2002 France tour
2003	England	Docklands, (56,347)	54,868	2003 England tour
2003	Ireland	Docklands (56,347)	54,206	RWC2003
2013	British & Irish Lions	Docklands (56,347)	56,771	
2014	France	Docklands (56,347)	27,189	
2016	England	AAMI Park (30,050)	29,871	
2017	Fiji	AAMI Park (30,050)	13,583	
2018	Ireland	AAMI Park (30,050)	29,018	
2021	France	AAMI Park (30,050)	20,114	
2022	New Zealand	Docklands (56,347)	53,359	
2023	New Zealand	MCG (100,024)	83,944	

Source: Australian Rugby Union

=== Rugby World Cup 2003 Matches and attendance in Melbourne ===
Teams	Attendance
All Blacks & Italy	41,715
Canada & All Blacks	38,889
England & Samoa	50,647
All Blacks & South Africa	40,734
France & Ireland	33,134

== See also ==
- Dewar Shield
- Rugby union in Australia
- Sport in Victoria
