= Gordon Wood (rugby union) =

British Lions & Ireland international rugby union player (1931–1982)

- Born: Benjamin Gordon Malison Wood; 20 June 1931 Limerick, Ireland
- Died: 18 May 1982 (aged 50)
- Height: 1.78 m (5 ft 10 in)
- Weight: 97.52 kg (215 lb)
- School: Crescent College
- Notable relative: Keith Wood (son)

Rugby union career
- Position: Prop
Senior career
Years	Team	Apps	(Points)
- Garryowen
–	Lansdowne		
Provincial / State sides
Years	Team	Apps	(Points)
- Munster
International career
Years	Team	Apps	(Points)
1954–1961	Ireland	29	(3)
1959	British and Irish Lions	2	(0)

Benjamin Gordon Malison Wood (20 June 1931 – 18 May 1982) was a rugby union footballer who represented Ireland and the British Lions during the 1950s and early 1960s. He also played for Garryowen and Munster. His son Keith Wood later played for the same four teams.

== Early years ==
Wood was educated at Crescent College and once scored four tries - playing at wing against Mungret College. Among his team mates while playing for Crescent was the actor Richard Harris.

== Rugby career ==
=== Ireland ===
Between 1954 and 1961, Wood made 29 full appearances for Ireland. He made his Ireland debut on 13 February 1954 in 14-3 defeat against England at Twickenham. He scored his only try on 27 February 1960 in a 6-5 defeat against Scotland at Lansdowne Road. Wood made his last full appearance for Ireland on 13 May 1961 in a 24-8 away defeat against South Africa.

=== British Lions ===
Together with Tony O'Reilly, Andy Mulligan, Ronnie Dawson, Syd Millar and Noel Murphy, Wood was part of a strong Ireland contingent included in the British Lions squad for their 1959 tour to Australia and New Zealand. Wood played in 15 of the 33 tour games, including two Test games against New Zealand. He made his debut for the Lions against Victoria on 23 May and played his final game against North Auckland on 12 September. He scored two tries on the tour - one against New Zealand Universities on 1 July and another against Marlborough and Nelson Bays on 29 July.

== Gordon Wood Trophy ==
Wood later became the first coach of the Garda Rugby Football Club. The club continues to play an annual challenge match against an Irish Defence Forces XV in his honour with the winners being awarded the Gordon Wood Trophy. In 2023, the 50th Anniversary of the first awarding of the Trophy, AGS Rugby will play 2 games, Women’s and Men’s against a Defence Forces team at Clarisford Park in Killaloe, home pitch of Ballina Killaloe RFC and home town of Keith Wood. Both matches are scheduled for 10 May.
