= 1959 British Lions tour to Australia and New Zealand =

- Date: 23 May – 19 September
- Coach: O.B. Glasgow
- Tour captain: (Ireland) Ronnie Dawson
- Test series winners: (v Australia) British and Irish Lions (2–0) (v New Zealand) New Zealand (3–1)
- Top test point scorer: (Ireland) David Hewitt (16)
Summary
P	W	D	L
Total
33	27	0	6
Test match
6	3	0	3
Opponent
P	W	D	L
Australia
2	2	0	0
New Zealand
4	1	0	3

Tour chronology
- ← South Africa 1955 South Africa 1962 →

In 1959, the British Lions rugby union team toured Australia and New Zealand. The Lions won the two test matches against Australia but lost the international series against the All Blacks by three matches to one. They also played two matches in Canada, on the return leg of the journey.

Although New Zealand won the series, the results in three of the tests were close. The Lions scored four tries to nil in the first test but six penalties by Don Clarke saw the All Blacks win 18–17. Clarke also scored a late try and conversion to win the second test, 11–8. New Zealand won the third test comfortably by 22–8 to win the series but the fourth test, which the Lions won 9–6, could have gone the All Blacks' way had Clarke not missed a late penalty attempt.

Overall the tourists played thirty-three matches, winning twenty-seven and losing six. In Australia the Lions played six matches, winning five and losing one, to New South Wales. In New Zealand they played twenty-five matches, winning twenty and losing five – in addition to their three test defeats they also lost to Otago and Canterbury. They also played two matches in Canada, winning both.

The tour was notable for the 842 points scored in 33 games, a record number of points for a Lions tour and for the 22 tries scored by Tony O'Reilly, also a Lions tour record.

The touring party was captained by Ronnie Dawson. The manager was A. W. Wilson and the assistant manager was O.B. Glasgow.

== Touring party ==
=== Management ===
- Manager A. W. Wilson
- Assistant Manager O. B. Glasgow

=== Backs ===
- N. H. Brophy (UCD and Ireland)
- J. Butterfield (Northampton and England)
- S. Coughtrie (Edinburgh Academicals and Scotland)
- Terry Davies (Llanelli and Wales)
- M. A. F. English (Bohemians and Ireland)
- David Hewitt (Queen's University RFC and Ireland)
- J. P. Horrocks-Taylor (Leicester and England)
- Peter Jackson (Coventry and England)
- Dickie Jeeps (Northampton and England)
- Tony O'Reilly (Old Belvedere and Ireland)
- Andy Mulligan (Wanderers and Ireland)
- William "Bill" Michael Patterson (Sale)
- Malcolm Price (Pontypool and Wales)
- Bev Risman (Manchester and England)
- Ken Scotland (Cambridge University and Scotland)
- Malcolm Thomas (Newport and Wales)
- G. H. Waddell (Cambridge University and Scotland)
- J. R. C. Young (Harlequins and England)

=== Forwards ===
- Alan Ashcroft (Waterloo and England)
- Ronnie Dawson (Wanderers and Ireland)
- Roddy Evans (Cardiff and Wales)
- John Faull (Swansea and Wales)
- Hugh McLeod (Hawick and Scotland)
- David Marques (Harlequins and England)
- Bryn Meredith (Newport and Wales)
- Syd Millar (Ballymena and Ireland)
- Haydn Morgan (Abertillery and Wales)
- Bill Mulcahy (UCD and Ireland)
- Noel Murphy (Cork Constitution and Ireland)
- Ray Prosser (Pontypool and Wales)
- Ken Smith (Kelso and Scotland)
- R. H. Williams (Llanelli and Wales)
- Gordon Wood (Garryowen and Ireland)

== Results ==
Test matches

Date	Opponent	Location	Result	Score
23 May	(Victoria (state)) Victoria	Melbourne, Australia	Win	53–18
30 May	New South Wales	Sydney, Australia	Loss	14–18
2 June	Queensland	Brisbane, Australia	Win	39–11
6 June	Australia	Brisbane, Australia	Win	17–6
9 June	New South Wales Country Districts	Tamworth, Australia	Win	27–14
13 June	Australia	Sydney, Australia	Win	24–3
20 June	Hawke's Bay	Napier, New Zealand	Win	52–12
24 June	Poverty Bay / East Coast	Gisborne, New Zealand	Win	23–14
27 June	Auckland	Auckland, New Zealand	Win	15–10
1 July	New Zealand Universities	Christchurch, New Zealand	Win	25–13
4 July	Otago	Dunedin, New Zealand	Loss	8–26
8 July	South Canterbury / Mid Canterbury / North Otago	Timaru, New Zealand	Win	21–11
11 July	Southland	Invercargill, New Zealand	Win	11–6
18 July	New Zealand	Dunedin, New Zealand	Loss	17–18
22 July	West Coast-Buller	Greymouth, New Zealand	Win	58–3
25 July	Canterbury	Christchurch, New Zealand	Loss	14–20
29 July	Marlborough / Nelson / Golden Bay-Motueka	Blenheim, New Zealand	Win	64–5
1 August	Wellington	Wellington, New Zealand	Win	21–6
5 August	Wanganui	Wanganui, New Zealand	Win	9–6
8 August	Taranaki	New Plymouth, New Zealand	Win	15–3
11 August	Manawatu / Horowhenua	Palmerston North, New Zealand	Win	26–6
15 August	New Zealand	Wellington, New Zealand	Loss	8–11
19 August	King Country / Counties	Taumarunui, New Zealand	Win	25–5
22 August	Waikato	Hamilton, New Zealand	Win	14–0
25 August	Wairarapa / Bush	Masterton, New Zealand	Win	37–11
29 August	New Zealand	Christchurch, New Zealand	Loss	8–22
2 September	New Zealand Juniors	Wellington, New Zealand	Win	29–9
5 September	New Zealand Māori	Auckland, New Zealand	Win	12–6
9 September	Bay of Plenty / Thames Valley	Rotorua, New Zealand	Win	26–24
12 September	North Auckland	Whangārei, New Zealand	Win	35–13
19 September	New Zealand	Auckland, New Zealand	Win	9–6
27 September	British Columbia	Vancouver, Canada	Win	16–11
29 September	Eastern Canada All-Stars	Toronto, Canada	Win	70–6

== The matches ==
=== First Australia Test ===
6 June

Australia	6–17	British Lions
Pen: Donald (2)		Try: O'Reilly; Smith; Con: Risman; Pen: Hewitt (2); Drop: Scotland

Exhibition Ground, Brisbane
Attendance: 20,000
Referee: B.J. O'Callaghan (Australia)

Australia: JK Lenehan (NSW), AR Morton (NSW), JM Potts (NSW), LJ Diett (NSW), KJ Donald (Queensland), AJ Summons (NSW), DM Connor (Queensland), PK Dunn (NSW), PG Johnson (NSW), KJ Ellis (NSW); JH Carroll (NSW), AR Miller (NSW); PT Fenwicke (NSW) Captain, R Outterside (NSW), J Thornett (NSW)

British Lions: KJF Scotland, PB Jackson, M Price, D Hewitt, AJF O'Reilly, AB Risman, REG Jeeps, HF McLeod, AR Dawson Captain, S Millar, GK Smith, WA Mulcahy, RH Williams, A Ashcroft, J Faull

=== Second Australia Test ===
13 June

Australia	3–24	British Lions
Pen: Donald		Try: Dawson; O'Reilly; Price (2); Risman; Con: Hewitt (2); Scotland; Pen: Scotland

Sydney Sports Ground, Sydney
Attendance: 20,000
Referee: A.T. Tierney (Australia)

Australia: JK Lenehan (NSW), AR Morton (NSW), RC Kay (Victoria), LJ Diett (NSW), KJ Donald (Queensland), AJ Summons (NSW), DM Connor (Queensland); KJ Ellis (NSW), PG Johnson (NSW), PK Dunn (NSW); JH Carroll (NSW), AR Miller (NSW), JE Thornett (NSW), R Outterside (NSW), PT Fenwicke (NSW) Captain

British Lions: KJF Scotland, PB Jackson, D Hewitt, M Price, AJF O'Reilley, AB Risman, REG Jeeps, HF McLeod, AR Dawson Captain, S Millar, WR Evans, RH Williams, NAA Murphy, RWD Marques, GK Smith

=== First New Zealand Test ===
18 July

New Zealand	18–17	British Lions
Pen: DB Clarke (6)		Try: Jackson; O'Reilly; Price (2); Con:Risman; Pen: Hewitt

Carisbrook, Dunedin
Attendance: 41,500
Referee: A.L. Fleury (New Zealand)

New Zealand: DB Clarke (Waikato), PT Walsh (Counties), RF McMullen (Auckland), TR Lineen (Auckland), BE McPhail (Canterbury), RH Brown (Taranaki), RJ Urbahn (Taranaki); WJ Whineray (Canterbury) Captain, RC Hemi (Waikato), IJ Clarke (Waikato), SF Hill (Canterbury), BE Finlay (Manauatu), PFH Jones (North Auckland), EAR Pickering (Waikato), IN MacEwan (Wellington)

British Lions: KJF Scotland, PB Jackson, MJ Price, D Hewitt, AJF O'Reilley, ABW Risman, REG Jeeps, HF McLeod, AR Dawson Captain, BGM Wood, WR Evans, RH Williams, GK Smith, J Faull, NA Murphy

=== Second New Zealand Test ===
15 August

New Zealand	11–8	British Lions
Try: Caulton (2); DB Clarke; Con: DB Clarke		Try: Young; Con:Davies; Pen: Davies

Athletic Park, Wellington
Attendance: 53,000
Referee: C.R. Gillies (New Zealand)

New Zealand: DB Clarke (Waikato), ES Diack (Otago), RF McMullen (Auckland), TR Lineen (Auckland), RW Caulton (Wellington), JF McCullough (Taranaki), KC Briscoe (Taranaki), WJ Whineray (Canterbury) Captain, DS Webb (North Auckland), IJ Clarke (Waikato), SF Hill (Canterbury), IN MacEwan (Wellington), CE Meads (Kings Country), RJ Conway (Otago), KR Tremain (Canterbury)

British Lions: TE Davies, JRC Young, MC Thomas, WM Patterson, AJF O'Reilley, MJ Price, REG Jeeps, S Millar, AR Dawson Captain, HF McLeod, RH Williams, WR Evans, A Ashcroft, RWD Marques, NA Murphy

=== Third New Zealand Test ===
29 August

New Zealand	22–8	British Lions
Try: Caulton (2); Meads; Urbahn; Con: DB Clarke (2); Pen: DB Clarke; Drop: DB Clarke		Try: Hewitt; Con: Faull; Pen: Faull

Lancaster Park, Christchurch
Attendance: 57,000
Referee: C.R. Gillies (New Zealand)

New Zealand: DB Clarke (Waikato), RH Brown (Taranaki), TR Lineen (Auckland), RW Caulton (Wellington), JF McCullough (Taranaki), RJ Urbahn (Taranaki), MW Irwin (Otago), RC Hemi (Waikato), WJ Whineray (Canterbury) Captain, SF Hill (Canterbury), IN MacEwan (Wellington), KR Tremain (Canterbury), RJ Conway (Otago), CE Meads (Kings Country)

British Lions: KJF Scotland, PB Jackson, MJ Price, D Hewitt, AJF O'Reilley, JP Horrocks-Taylor, REG Jeeps, HF McLeod, AR Dawson Captain, BGM Wood, WR Evans, RH Williams, HJ Morgan, J Faull, GK Smith

=== Fourth New Zealand Test ===
19 September

New Zealand	6–9	British Lions
Pen: DB Clarke (2)		Try: Jackson; O'Reilly; Risman

Eden Park, Auckland
Attendance: 60,000
Referee: J.P. Murphy (New Zealand)

New Zealand: DB Clarke (Waikato), BE McPhail (Canterbury), TR Lineen (Auckland), AH Clarke (Auckland), RW Caulton (Wellington), JF McCullough (Taranaki), RJ Urbahn (Taranaki), MW Irwin (Otago), RC Hemi (Waikato), WJ Whineray (Canterbury) Captain, SF Hill (Canterbury), CE Meads (Kings Country), EAR Pickering (Waikato), RJ Conway (Otago), KR Tremain (Canterbury)

British Lions: TE Davies, PB Jackson, D Hewitt, KJF Scotland, AJF O'Reilley, ABW Risman, AA Mulligan, TR Prosser, AR Dawson Captain, HF McLeod, RH Williams, WA Mulcahy, NA Murphy, J Faull, HJ Morgan
