= Elias: The Little Rescue Boat =

Norwegian children's media franchise

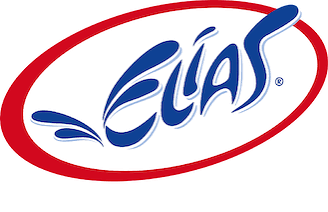
- Logo
- Den lille redningsskøyta Elias
- Genre: Children's; Adventure; Educational
- Created by: Alf Knutsen; Sigurd Slåttebrekk
- Directed by: Espen Fyksen; Lise Osvoll; Astrid Aakra; Will Ashurst (reboot)
- Country of origin: Norway
- Original language: Norwegian
- No. of series: 3
- No. of episodes: 78

Production
- Producers: John M. Jacobsen (original); Sigurd Slåttebrekk (reboot)
- Production companies: Filmkameratene (original); Animando (reboot)

Original release
- Network: TV 2 NRK Super
- Release: 20 August 2005 – present

Related
- Elias and the Royal Yacht (2007); Elias and the Treasure of the Sea (2010); Anchors Up (2017)

Elias: The Little Rescue Boat (Norwegian: Den lille redningsskøyta Elias) is a Norwegian children's media franchise created by Alf Knutsen and Sigurd Slåttebrekk. The stories follow Elias, a small rescue boat, and his friends along the Norwegian coast, mainly in the fictional fishing village of Cozy Cove (Norwegian: Lunvik). The character first appeared in book form in 1999, after which the franchise was developed into computer-animated television series, feature films, books, music, games and other products. The first animated television series premiered on TV 2 in 2005.

Elias has also been associated with the Norwegian Society for Sea Rescue (Redningsselskapet) and its work promoting maritime safety among children.

== History ==
=== Background and books ===
The idea of a small rescue boat named Elias was developed by Alf Knutsen and Sigurd Slåttebrekk in the late 1990s.

The first book, Redningsskøyta Elias, was published in 1999. It was written by Eyvind Skeie from an idea by Alf Knutsen and illustrated by Jon Ranheimsæter.

The stories are mainly set in the fictional fishing village of Cozy Cove, inspired by Norwegian coastal culture. Elias works as a rescue boat and helps both his friends and other vessels that encounter problems at sea.

A number of books based on the television series and films were subsequently published. Several of these were illustrated by Olav Asland.

== Television series ==
=== Original series (2005–2008) ===
Work on a computer-animated television series about Elias began in the early 2000s. The series was produced by Filmkameratene in cooperation with, among others, TV 2 and the Norwegian Society for Sea Rescue.

John M. Jacobsen served as producer, while Espen Fyksen and Lise Osvoll were among the directors.

The first episode, Welcome to Cozy Cove (Norwegian: Velkommen til Lunvik), was broadcast on TV 2 on 20 August 2005. The first season consisted of 26 episodes.

The series follows Elias after he arrives in Cozy Cove to begin working as a rescue boat. He meets, among others, the fishing boat Trawler, the cabin cruiser Cruiser, Smacky, Craney, Big Blinky, Helinor, and the small dinghy Swifty.

A second season consisting of 13 episodes was broadcast in 2008. The original series therefore consists of 39 episodes in total.

The series was nominated for an International Emmy Award in 2006.

John M. Jacobsen received the professional award at Gullruten 2007 for his work on the series.

The original television series was also distributed internationally. However, only two episodes have ever been officially confirmed to receive an English dub.

=== New series (2014–present) ===
A new version of Elias was launched on NRK Super in 2014.

The new series was produced by Animando, with Sigurd Slåttebrekk as producer. Astrid Aakra and Will Ashurst were among the directors. It also aired on Netflix June 1. 2015 in all English-speaking countries.

An NRK overview of external productions described the series as consisting of 26 episodes of eleven minutes each.

The series introduced a new visual style and updated versions of several of the original characters. Elias works together with Helinor and Dippy as a regular rescue team. Trawler, Cruiser, Craney (Renamed to Crane), Big Blinky, Smacky and other characters from the original universe also appear.

Internationally, the newer series has been marketed under the title Elias: Rescue Team Adventures. The theme song for the English version of the series was composed and produced by Grammy and Emmy award-winning songwriter Dennis Scott.

== Feature films ==
Three Norwegian feature films based on the Elias franchise have been produced.

=== Elias and the Royal Yacht ===
Elias and the Royal Yacht (Norwegian: Elias og kongeskipet) premiered in 2007. The film expanded the television series' world with the Royal Yacht and several new characters.

The film was directed by Espen Fyksen and Lise Osvoll.

The film follows Elias as he becomes involved in the search for the missing Royal Yacht.

=== Elias and the Treasure of the Sea ===
Elias and the Treasure of the Sea (Norwegian: Elias og jakten på havets gull) premiered on 10 December 2010.

The film was awarded the Amanda Award for Best Children's Film in 2011.

Gaute Storaas received the Nordic Film Composer Award in 2011 for his music for the film.

=== Anchors Up ===
The third feature film, Elias og Storegaps hemmelighet, premiered in Norway on 6 October 2017.

The film was directed by Simen Alsvik and Will Ashurst and produced by Animando and Steamheads Studios in cooperation with Qvisten Animation.

Its international English title is Anchors Up.

The story follows Elias after he carries out a difficult rescue operation and is offered a job in the larger harbour of Big Harbor. There he discovers that illegal activity is taking place in Storegap and seeks help from his friends in Cozy Cove. Qvisten describes the film as a CGI production in which Elias discovers an illegal mining operation and returns to his old friends for help.

The film won the award for Best Children's Film at the Amanda Awards in 2018.

== Setting and themes ==
The stories use a setting strongly inspired by Norwegian coastal culture. Boats, lighthouses, cranes and other machines are anthropomorphised and given faces, personalities and human characteristics.

Several characters speak with Norwegian dialects, while the stories and locations draw elements from fishing villages, harbours and landscapes along the Norwegian coast.

The stories frequently deal with rescue work, friendship, cooperation, responsibility and safety at sea.

== Music ==
The music for the television series and feature films was primarily composed by Gaute Storaas.

In 2010, the album Elias – alle sangene fra filmene og TV was released. The album contains 24 tracks from Elias productions.

== Voice cast (original series) ==
Among the actors who provided voices for characters in the Norwegian productions were:

- Joakim Gunby – Elias (season 1)
- Aleksander Emil Dyrberg Ek – Elias (Elias and the Royal Yacht and season 2)
- Mikael Aksnes-Pehrson – Elias (Elias and the Treasure of the Sea)
- Fredrik Steen – Trawler and Arthur
- Even Stormoen – Big Blinky
- Yngve Emil Marcussen – Cruiser
- Rigmor Galtung – Craney
- Dennis Storhøi – Goliath, Uncle and Nephew
- Iren Reppen – Helinor
- Marit Andreassen – Sentimental and Captain Gunpowder
- Cecilie Mosli – Rude
- Jostein Sjøhaug – Jovial
- Esben Selvig – The Fishmonger
- Linn Skåber – Seagull
- Morten Røhrt – Little Blinky, Emma and Otto
- Ane Dahl Torp – Suverina
- Per Christian Ellefsen – Sinus
- Nils Ole Oftebro – Rocke II
- Svein Tindberg – The Royal Yacht

The cast varies between the original television series, the three feature films and the newer television series.

== Norwegian Society for Sea Rescue ==
Elias has been associated with the Norwegian Society for Sea Rescue (Redningsselskapet) since the beginning of the franchise and its work promoting maritime awareness and safety among children.

The Norwegian Society for Sea Rescue has used Elias in activities and informational work aimed at children, and several smaller boats designed after the character have been built.

== International distribution ==
The Elias productions have been distributed in a number of countries.

Although the original series was never fully broadcast or streamed with an official English dub, two episodes were officially dubbed as a demonstration for international distribution.

Animando states that the Elias property has a history of more than 20 years of television and film productions and that its content has been shown in more than 120 countries.

The newer television series has been distributed internationally under the title Elias: Rescue Team Adventures, while the third feature film was distributed internationally under the title Anchors Up.

=== Television ===
- 2005 – Elias, season 1 – 26 episodes
- 2008 – Elias, season 2 – 13 episodes
- 2014 – new television series / Elias: Rescue Team Adventures

=== Season 1 ===
No.	Title
1	Welcome to Cozy Cove
2	Big Blinky
3	Moustache Wax
4	Cruiser Cool Cat
5	Trawler in Trouble
6	Trawler in the Shipyard
7	Swifty Comes to Cozy Cove
8	Blusterberg
9	Smacky and Gull
10	Big Blinky's New Bulb
11	Cruiser's Test Race
12	The Big Boat Race
13	Smacky in the Fog
14	Cozy Cove Creature
15	Lookout Duty
16	Gull in Shock
17	Sunday
18	The Pinch
19	Goliath to the Rescue
20	Unconscious
21	Swifty's Mission
22	Engine Trouble
23	Cruiser in the Wind
24	Storm Gathering
25	The Big Storm
26	Fearless' Bell

=== Season 2 ===
No.	Title
1	Fishing Competition
2	Rubbish in Cozy Cove
3	Where is Elias?
4	Suverina the Supply Boat
5	Cruiser's Harbour Party
6	The Mystery of Deep Sea Cave
7	The Ghost Boat
8	Elias and Little Blinky
9	Bottle Post
10	Sinus' Magic Medicine
11	Captain Gunpowder
12	Crisis in Cozy Cove
13	Royal Visit

=== Feature films ===
- 2007 – Elias and the Royal Yacht
- 2010 – Elias and the Treasure of the Sea
- 2017 – Anchors Up

=== Books ===
- 1999 – Eyvind Skeie: Redningsskøyta Elias, illustrated by Jon Ranheimsæter
- 1999 – Alf Knutsen: Elias og nordlyset

A number of picture books, activity books and books based on episodes and feature films were subsequently published.

== Theatre ==
Nordland Teater staged the play Redningsskøyta Elias in 2010. The production was written by Alf Knutsen and directed by Ragnhild Lund.

== See also ==
- Norwegian animation
- Norwegian Society for Sea Rescue
- List of Norwegian animated television series
