= Jimmy Dick (rugby union) =

Rugby union player from Northern Ireland

- Full name: James S. Dick
- Born: 24 October 1939 (age 87) Ballymena, Northern Ireland
- School: Ballymena Academy
- University: Queen's University Belfast
- Notable relative: Ian Dick (brother)

Rugby union career
- Position: Hooker
International career
| Years | Team | Apps | (Points) |
| 1962 | Ireland | 1 | (0) |

James S. Dick (born 24 October 1939) is an Irish former international rugby union player.

Born in Ballymena, Dick attended Ballymena Academy and was an Ulster Schools representative hooker.

Dick played rugby for Queen's University Belfast during his medical studies. He was a member of the Ireland squad on the 1961 tour of South Africa, along with his brother Ian, but didn't appear against the Springboks. Prior to the 1962 Five Nations, Dick scored two tries in an Irish trial, opposite British Lions and national captain Ronnie Dawson, who he was then preferred over for the opening fixture against England at Twickenham. After a 16–0 loss, Dick was discarded by Ireland and this remained his only cap.

== See also ==
- List of Ireland national rugby union players
