= 1961 Ireland rugby union tour of South Africa =

Summary
P	W	D	L
Total
4	3	0	1
Test match
1	0	0	1
Opponent
P	W	D	L
South Africa
1	0	0	1

Tour chronology
- ← Chile & Argentina 1952 Australia 1967 →

1961 Ireland rugby union tour of South Africa. Between 1906 and 1960 South Africa had played Ireland on five occasions. However all of these games had been played in Ireland. In 1960 South Africa had beaten Ireland 8–3 at Lansdowne Road. The following year Ireland embarked on their first tour of South Africa. Among the touring party was Tony O'Reilly who had previously toured South Africa with the British Lions in 1955. The tour began with a full international at Newlands Stadium which Ireland lost 24–8. Tom Kiernan scored all of Ireland's points with a try, a conversion and a penalty. Four members of this touring party – Niall Brophy, Tom Kiernan, Syd Millar and Bill Mulcahy – would return to South Africa with the British Lions in 1962. Kiernan, Millar and Ronnie Dawson, as a coach, would also return with the Lions in 1968.

== Matches ==
Scores and results list Ireland's points tally first.

Opposing Team	For	Against	Date	Venue	Status
South Africa	8	24	13 May 1961	Newlands Park, Cape Town	Test Match
South West District XV	11	6	17 May 1961	Kings Park, Mossel Bay	Tour match
Western Transvaal	16	6	20 May 1961	De Beers Stadium, Potchefstroom	Tour match
Rhodesia	24	0	24 May 1961	Salisbury	Tour match
Boland	16	0	11 June 1961	Boland Stadium, Wellington	Tour match

== Touring party ==
- Manager: Noel F. Murphy
- Honorary Assistant Manager: Tony O'Reilly
- Captain: Ronnie Dawson

=== Backs ===
- Niall Brophy (University College Dublin)
- T.J. Cleary (Bohemians)
- Johnny Dooley (Galwegians)
- Dion Glass (Collegians)
- W. J. Hewitt Hewitt (Instonians)
- Kenneth Houston (London Irish/Oxford University)
- Tom Kiernan (University College Cork)
- Andy Mulligan (Cambridge University)
- Tony O'Reilly (Leicester/Old Belvedere)
- W.G. Tormey (University College Dublin)
- Jerry Walsh (University College Cork)

=== Forwards ===
- Gerry Culliton (Wanderers)
- Ronnie Dawson (Wanderers)
- Ian Dick (Ballymena)
- Jimmy Dick (Queen's University)
- Ronnie Kavanagh (Wanderers)
- Timothy McGrath (Garryowen)
- Syd Millar (Ballymena)
- Bill Mulcahy (University College Dublin)
- Noel A. A. Murphy (Cork Constitution)
- Dennis Scott (Malone)
- J.N. Thomas (Blackrock College)
- Gordon Wood (Garryowen)

== See also ==
- Ireland vs South Africa at rugby union
