= Timothy McGrath =

Irish rugby union player

- Born: 3 October 1933 Cork, Ireland
- Died: 23 September 1978 (aged 44) Dungarvan, Ireland

Rugby union career
- Position: No. 8
International career
Years	Team	Apps	(Points)
1956–61	Ireland	7	(0)

Timothy McGrath (3 October 1933 — 23 September 1978) was an Irish international rugby union player.

Born in Cork, McGrath played for Limerick club Garryowen and represented Munster.

McGrath, a forward, could play both in the second and back rows of the scrum. Injury prone, McGrath was capped seven times for Ireland in intermittent appearances between 1956 and 1961, utilised as a number eight. This included all matches of the 1960 Five Nations and the 1961 tour South Africa, where he played against the Springboks at Cape Town.

== See also ==
- List of Ireland national rugby union players
