= Ian Dick =

Ian Dick may refer to:

- Ian Dick (Australian sportsman) (1926–2012), Australian cricketer and field hockey player
- Ian Dick (rugby union) (born 1937), Irish international rugby union player
