= John Young (rugby union) =

English rugby union player (1937–2020)

- Born: John Robert Chester Young; 6 September 1937 Chester, England
- Died: 19 March 2020 (aged 82)
- Height: 5 ft 7 in (170 cm)
- Weight: 12 st 7 lb (79 kg; 175 lb)
- School: Bishop Vesey's Grammar School
- University: Oxford University

Rugby union career
- Position: Wing
Amateur team(s)
Years	Team	Apps	(Points)
1958–1965	Harlequins		((?))
International career
Years	Team	Apps	(Points)
1958–1961	England	9	(6)
1959	British and Irish Lions	1	(3)

John Robert Chester Young (6 September 1937 – 19 March 2020) was an English rugby union player who played in the Wing position. Young played club rugby for Harlequin F.C., was capped nine times for the England national team, and was a member of the British Lions team that toured in 1959, playing in one test match during the tour against New Zealand.

== Early career ==
Born in Chester, Young attended Bishop Vesey's Grammar School, Sutton Coldfield, and then went to Oxford University to study law. While at Oxford, Young competed in the 1956 AAA Championships, winning the 100-yard sprint race. and in the 1957 and 1958 Varsity rugby matches against Cambridge University.

Ahead of the 1958/59 season, Young was invited to join the Harlequins rugby club in London. Young remained with the club for seven seasons, making 102 appearances.

== International and invitational appearances ==
Young made his début for England against Ireland in the 1958 Five Nations Championship. His next appearance for the national team was not until 1960 when he played in all four of England's matches during that year's Five Nations Championship. After an appearance against South Africa in January 1961, Young played three games in the 1961 Five Nations, with his final appearance in the England jersey being against France.

Young was selected as part of the squad for the 1959 British Lions tour to Australia and New Zealand. As part of the tour, Young played in 14 matches, the second test match against New Zealand and in 13 tour matches against local opposition. He scored a total of 14 tries during the tour.

Young played five times for the Barbarians invitational team, twice during the 1959 Easter Tour against Cardiff and Newport, against Leicester in December 1959, against a South Africa XV in 1961 and against the East Midlands in 1963.

== Personal life ==
Outside of his involvement in rugby, Young worked in law before switching to stockbroking. In 1961, he joined stockbroker Simon & Coates, working his way through several positions at the firm to become deputy senior partner. In 1982, he was appointed Director of Policy and Planning at the London Stock Exchange and in 1987 became the first chief executive of The Securities Association. He was the director and chief executive of the Securities and Investments Board from 1993 to 1996. At Lloyd's of London, he was deputy chairman of Lloyd's Council and chairman of Lloyd's Regulatory Board.

Young married Pauline Yates in 1963; the couple had three children.
