= Diack =

Diack is a surname. Notable people with the surname include:

- Lamine Diack (1933–2021), Senegalese businessman, sports administrator, and former athlete
- Lamine Diack (footballer) (born 2000), Senegalese footballer
- Robbie Diack (born 1985), South African-born Irish rugby union player
- Tuppy Diack (1930–2025), New Zealand rugby union player
