= John Faull =

Wales international rugby union footballer

- Born: John Faull; 30 June 1933 Morriston, Wales
- Died: 21 June 2017 (aged 83)
- Height: 6 ft 0 in (1.83 m)
- Weight: 14 st 13 lb (95 kg)
- School: Bromsgrove School

Rugby union career
- Position: Number 8
Amateur team(s)
Years	Team	Apps	(Points)
1953–1963	Swansea RFC		
1957–1958	Barbarian F.C.		
International career
Years	Team	Apps	(Points)
1957–1960	Wales	12	(3)
1959	British Lions	4	(5)

John Faull (30 June 1933 – 21 June 2017) was a Welsh international number 8 who played club rugby for Swansea. He won twelve caps for Wales and was selected to play in the British Lions on the 1959 tour of Australia and New Zealand. His father, Wilfred Faull, was an international rugby referee and was president of the Welsh Rugby Union in the 1960s.

== Rugby career ==
Faull joined Swansea in October 1953 at the age of twenty. In December of that year he was chosen to face the touring New Zealand national rugby union team alongside Len Blyth and Clem Thomas and he kicked two penalty goals, scoring all of Swansea's points in a memorable 6–6 draw.

Faull made his Wales debut in the 1957 Five Nations Championship in a narrow win against Ireland. It was a difficult match played in terrible muddy conditions, and in the second half the entire Welsh team were allowed to retire to the changing rooms to change their kit to allow the referee to distinguish the teams. His second game for Wales was in the same tournament against France, and Faull scored his first international points when he scored a try. Faull played a total of twelve games for Wales including the 1958 test match against the touring Australians.

In 1959 he was selected to tour with the 1959 British Lions, and played in four test matches, one against Australia and three against New Zealand.

== Personal life ==
John Faull married Anne Munday on 1 November 1959. They had three children; Jonathan Faull, Isabel Davies and Antonia Watkins and six grandchildren. They lived in Wales in Old Walls, Gower. He died on 21 June 2017.

== International matches played ==
Wales

- Australia 1958
- England 1958, 1959, 1960
- France 1957, 1958, 1960
- Ireland 1957, 1958, 1959
- Scotland 1958, 1959

British Lions

- Australia 1959
- New Zealand 1959, 1959, 1959

== Bibliography ==
- Smith, David; Williams, Gareth (1980). Fields of Praise: The Official History of The Welsh Rugby Union. Cardiff: University of Wales Press. ISBN 0-7083-0766-3.
