= Peter Dunn (rugby union) =

- Full name: Peter Keith Dunn
- Born: 29 October 1936 Manly, Sydney, Australia
- Died: 15 March 2019 (aged 82)

Rugby union career
- Position: Prop
International career
Years	Team	Apps	(Points)
1958–59	Australia	5	(0)

Peter Keith Dunn (29 October 1936 — 15 March 2019) was an Australian rugby union international.

A Manly RUFC product, Dunn was a prop and gained five caps for the Wallabies. He played all three Tests on the 1958 tour of New Zealand, which included a win in Christchurch, then both Tests against the 1959 British Lions.

Dunn was later a rugby league player with Collegians and Wentworthville.

== See also ==
- List of Australia national rugby union players
