= Dennis Scott =

Dennis Scott may refer to:

- Dennis Scott (basketball) (born 1968), American former basketball player
- Dennis Scott (rugby league) (born 1976), Australian rugby league footballer
- Dennis Scott (writer) (1939–1991), Jamaican poet, playwright, actor and dancer
- Dennis Scott (rugby union) (born 1933), Irish rugby union player
