= Cliff Lang =

Australian rugby union player

- Full name: Clifford Walter Patrick Lang
- Born: 2 July 1909 Multan, British India
- Died: 4 March 1942 (aged 32) Java, Dutch East Indies
- Height: 6 ft 2 in (188 cm)

Rugby union career
- Position: Prop
International career
Years	Team	Apps	(Points)
1938	Australia	2	(0)

Clifford Walter Patrick Lang (2 July 1909 – 4 March 1942) was an Australian rugby union international.

Lang was born in Multan (then part of British India) and educated at Dollar Academy in Clackmannanshire, Scotland.

A prop, Lang played his early rugby for Bedford and in 1927 immigrated to Melbourne, where he turned out for Harlequins and Footscray. His interstate performances for Victoria brought him to the attention of Wallabies selectors and he was capped in two Bledisloe Cup matches against the All Blacks in 1938. His year of birth is the matter of some dispute and he may have been as old as 38 or 39 at the time of his Test debut.

Lang was killed in action in Java in 1942, while serving as a Lieutenant with the 2/2nd Pioneer Battalion

== See also ==
- List of Australia national rugby union players
