= Johnny Dooley (rugby union) =

Irish rugby union player

- Full name: John Francis Dooley
- Born: 10 August 1934 Galway, Ireland
- Died: 7 March 2009 (aged 74) Salthill, Galway, Ireland

Rugby union career
- Position: Centre
International career
Years	Team	Apps	(Points)
1959	Ireland	3	(3)

John Francis Dooley (10 August 1934 — 7 March 2009) was an Irish international rugby union player.

== Biography ==
Born in Galway, Dooley was an Ireland Universities soccer international, but found more success as a rugby player, gaining three Ireland caps as a centre in the 1959 Five Nations. He scored a try in Ireland's win over Scotland at Murrayfield and later featured on the 1961 tour of South Africa, where he was a reserve for the one-off match against the Springboks. His club rugby was played with Galwegians, which he captained.

Dooley married the daughter of ex-Galway mayor Joseph Costello.

== See also ==
- List of Ireland national rugby union players
