= Dion Glass =

Rugby union player from Northern Ireland

- Full name: Dion Caldwell Glass
- Born: 15 May 1934 Belfast, Northern Ireland
- Died: 11 April 2011 (aged 76) Belfast, Northern Ireland

Rugby union career
- Position: Fly-half / Three-quarter
International career
| Years | Team | Apps | (Points) |
| 1958–61 | Ireland | 4 | (0) |

Dion Caldwell Glass (15 May 1934 — 11 April 2011) was an Irish international rugby union player.

Born in Belfast, Glass attended Methodist College Belfast, which he captained to the 1952 Ulster Schools' Cup title.

Glass, a Collegians player, was capped four times for Ireland in intermittent appearances from 1958 to 1961. His first three caps were as a centre or wing three-quarter, then on the 1961 tour of South Africa he was utilised as the fly-half against the Springboks at Olën Park at Cape Town.

== See also ==
- List of Ireland national rugby union players
