= Roly Meates =

Irish rugby union footballer (died 2023)

T. W. Roland "Roly" Meates (born 1937 or 1938; died 5 July 2023) was an Ireland national rugby union team coach and chairman of the Irish Rugby Football Union board of selectors.

Meates studied dentistry at Trinity College Dublin, where he played as a forward with the Dublin University Football Club before moving to Wanderers. Meates coached Dublin University Football Club for 28 years, before moving to Leinster Rugby to coach for five years. He was Leinster's president in the 1968–69 season. He became Ireland national rugby union team coach from 1975 to 1977 and later chairman of the selection board. He returned to Leinster where he worked with Matt Williams, and latterly worked as scrummaging coach. He served as a governor of The High School, Dublin, and Chairman of the Sports Committee.

Meates died on 5 July 2023, at the age of 85.

| Preceded by Syd Millar | Irish national rugby coach 1975–1977 | Succeeded by Noel Murphy |
