= Dewar Shield =

- Sport: Rugby union
- Founded: 1909; 117 years ago
- No. of teams: 10; See teams
- Country: Melbourne, Victoria, Australia
- Most recent champion: Power House (2026)
- Most titles: Unicorns (20)

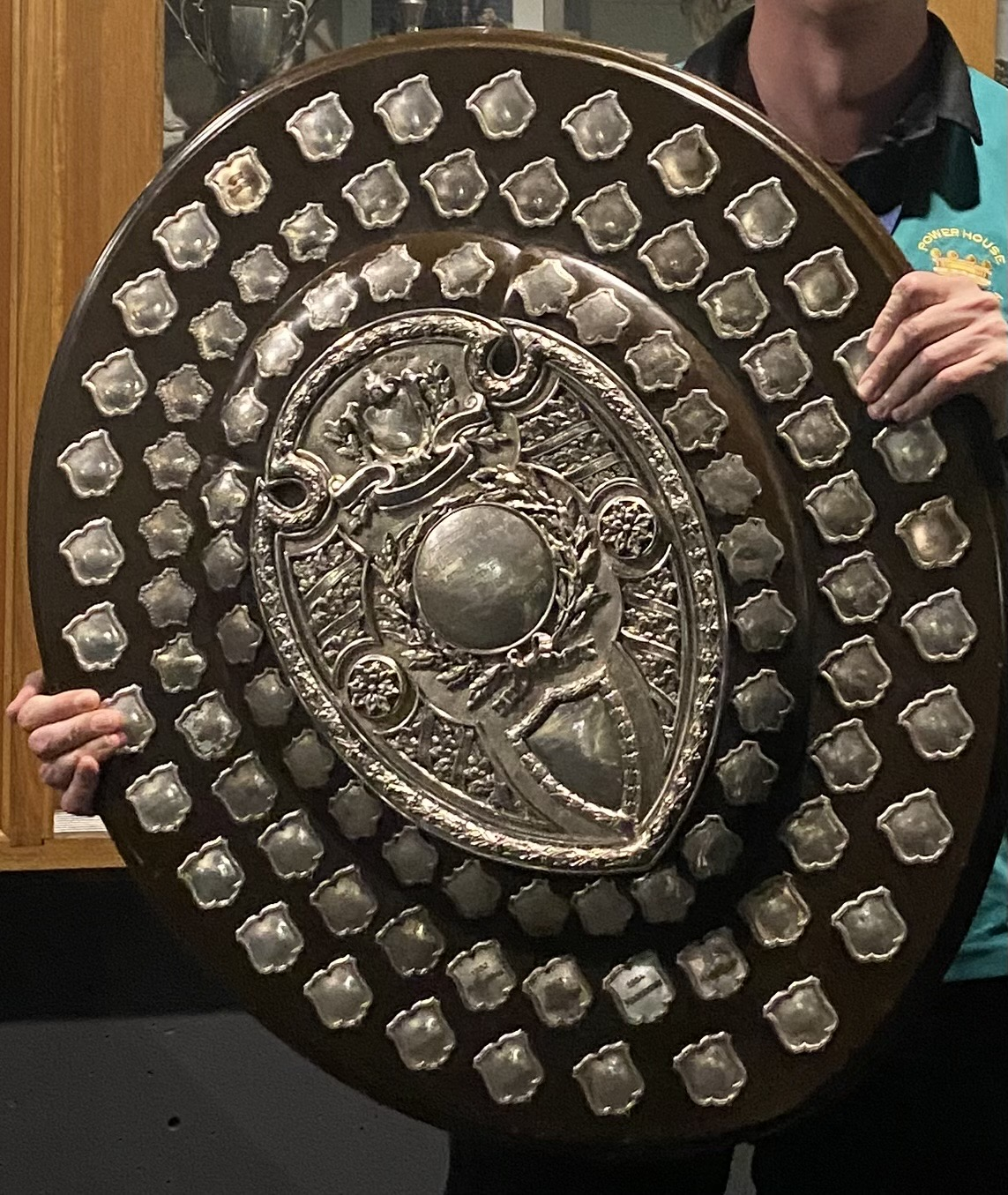
Dewar Shield, 2024

The Dewar Shield is a rugby union competition in Melbourne. It is the premier amateur rugby competition in Victoria. A total of ten teams from the Victorian Rugby Union compete for the Shield. Clubs must field teams in 3 grades, Dewar Shield Reserves (Penwill Cup) and Dewar Shield 3rd Grade (Mawhinney Cup), to be eligible to compete.

A "Game of the week" is streamed on the Rugby Victoria Facebook Page.

== History ==
The Victorian Rugby Union senior competition was established in 1909 with five teams, namely East Melbourne, Melbourne Unicorns, South Melbourne, St Kilda and University. Melbourne Unircorns won the first year of the five-team competition for the new trophy the Dewar Shield (donated by the Scotch Whisky Distillery John Dewar and Sons). One hundred years later in 2009 Melbourne Unicorns once again won the premiership defeating Box Hill in the Grand Final for the same Dewar Shield.

The Current (2026) Premiers are Power House who defeated Harlequins 39-36 in the Grand Final held at Box Hill

2026 was the 100th time the Dewar Shield had been awarded, due to the competition not being run during War Years, with Power House successfully defending their crown to win the historic 100th Grand Final and to complete a "Threepeat", having won the two years before.

The Premier competition is contested by ten clubs with each club fielding two teams (1st Grade, Reserve Grade). Other senior competitions offered are Metro 2nd Division with an A, B & C Grade, Colts (U20), Country, Women and Masters (over 35s).

A number of clubs have dominated the 1st Grade over the years. Melbourne Unicorns has the most number of Premierships with 20. Moorabbin holds the record for consecutive Premierships, winning six in a row from 1981 to 1986. Other prominent clubs during this 100-year period include Melbourne University, Power House and Navy.

Footscray and Endeavour Hills were promoted to the Premier division for the 2011 season.

== Dewar Shield Clubs ==
Teams that compete for the Dewar Shield
Est.	Colours	Club	Location	Home Ground	Nickname	Admitted to Premier Grade	Premierships (most recent)
1958		Box Hill	Box Hill	RHL Sparks Reserve	Broncos	1966	3 (2001)
1979		Endeavour Hills	Endeavour Hills	Frog Hollow Reserve	Eagles	2007	
1928		Footscray	Footscray	Henry Turner Memorial Reserve	Bulldogs	1928	3 (1937)
1928		Melbourne Harlequins	Ashwood	Ashwood Reserve	Quins	1930	12 (2023)
1909	Nátaga	Melbourne Unicorns	Armadale	Romanis Reserve, Orrong Park	Unicorns	1929	20 (2019)
1909		Melbourne University	Parkville	Royal Park	Students	1910	6 (1967)
1965		Moorabbin	Moorabbin	Keys Rd Reserve	Rams	1965	15 (2012)
1933		Power House	Albert Park	Noel Clarke Field	House, The Society	1936	14 (2026)
1923	.	Kiwi Hawthorn	Hawthorn	Lewin Reserve	Kiwis	1987, (1923 as The Kiwi Club)	13 (1996)
2011		Brimbank	Deer Park	Bon Thomas Reserve	Bucks	2026	

== Winners ==
Victorian Rugby Union Premiership winners

- 1909 Unicorns
- 1910 Melbourne University
- 1911 East Melbourne
- 1912 Unicorns
- 1913 Unicorns
- 1914 South Melbourne
- 1915–25 No competition
- 1926 Navy
- 1927 Kiwis
- 1928 Kiwis
- 1929 Kiwis
- 1930 Unicorns
- 1931 Kiwis
- 1932 Footscray
- 1933 Navy
- 1934 Melbourne University
- 1935 Unicorns
- 1936 Footscray
- 1937 Footscray
- 1938 Power House
- 1939 Kiwis
- 1940 R.A.A.F.
- 1941–45 No competition
- 1946 Navy
- 1947 Navy
- 1948 Unicorns
- 1949 Unicorns
- 1950 Unicorns
- 1951 Navy
- 1952 Navy
- 1953 Navy
- 1954 Unicorns
- 1955 Harlequin
- 1956 Power House
- 1957 Navy
- 1958 Power House
- 1959 Melbourne University
- 1960 Melbourne University
- 1961 Melbourne University
- 1962 Harlequin
- 1963 Melbourne University
- 1964 Melbourne University
- 1965 Unicorns
- 1966 Unicorns
- 1967 Melbourne University
- 1968 Power House
- 1969 Unicorns
- 1970 Kiwis
- 1971 Kiwis
- 1972 Kiwis
- 1973 Power House
- 1974 Power House
- 1975 Harlequin
- 1976 Kiwis
- 1977 Kiwis
- 1978 Moorabbin
- 1979 Kiwis
- 1980 Kiwis
- 1981 Moorabbin
- 1982 Moorabbin
- 1983 Moorabbin
- 1984 Moorabbin
- 1985 Moorabbin
- 1986 Moorabbin
- 1987 Power House
- 1988 Moorabbin
- 1989 Harlequin
- 1990 Moorabbin
- 1991 Moorabbin
- 1992 Harlequin
- 1993 Kiwi-Hawthorn
- 1994 Moorabbin
- 1995 Moorabbin
- 1996 Kiwi-Hawthorn
- 1997 Power House
- 1998 Unicorns
- 1999 Box Hill
- 2000 Box Hill
- 2001 Box Hill
- 2002 Moorabbin
- 2003 Unicorns
- 2004 Harlequin
- 2005 Moorabbin
- 2006 Power House
- 2007 Power House
- 2008 Power House
- 2009 Unicorns
- 2010 Unicorns
- 2011 Unicorns
- 2012 Moorabbin
- 2013 Harlequin
- 2014 Harlequin
- 2015 Harlequin
- 2016 Unicorns
- 2017 Harlequin
- 2018 Unicorns
- 2019 Unicorns
- 2020 COVID-19 - No winner
- 2021 COVID-19 - No winner
- 2022 Harlequin
- 2023 Harlequin
- 2024 Power House
- 2025 Power House
- 2026 Power House

== Former clubs ==
(list may not be complete)

- East Melbourne
- South Melbourne
- St Kilda
- Hawthorn
- Kiwi
- Navy
- R.A.A.F
- Boroondara
- South Melbourne
- Southern Districts^{b}
- Geelong
- Northcote/Northern

^{b} Southern Districts now play in the Premiership competition.

== See also ==
- Victorian Rugby Union
- Melbourne Rebels
- List of oldest rugby union competitions
- List of Australian club rugby union competitions
