= Stan Coughtrie =

British Lions & Scotland international rugby union player

Stan Coughtrie (19 July 1935 - July 2022) was a Scottish international rugby union player, who played for Scotland and the Lions.

He also played for Edinburgh Academicals.

He was on the 1959 British Lions tour to Australia and New Zealand.
