= Reg Lane =

Australian rugby union player (1898–1962)

- Born: Reginald Ewart Lane; 7 September 1898 Tenterfield, New South Wales
- Died: 31 August 1962
- Height: 5 ft 7 1/2 in (1.71 m)
- Weight: 11 st 7 lb (73 kg)
- School: Newington College
- Notable relative: Albert Lane (uncle)
- Occupation(s): TV & radio executive

Rugby union career
- Position: Wing
International career
Years	Team	Apps	(Points)
1921	Wallabies	1	(0)

Reginald Ewart Lane (7 September 1898 – 31 August 1962) was a rugby union player who represented Australia. He captained Victoria in the mid-1920s. In his business life he founded the Macquarie Radio Network and was General Manager of the radio station 2GB. He became a director of I.T.N. Ltd, a company holding a licence to operate a commercial television station in the Illawarra area of New South Wales.

== Birth and family ==
Lane was born in Tenterfield, New South Wales, the fifth of six children. His parents were Elizabeth Rebecca (née Lester) and Benjamin Lane (1854–1927), a Methodist minister. Within the church Benjamin Lane was "a noted builder of churches and parsonages" in the circuits where he served. The other children of the Lane family were: Rozetta (b.1889, Murrurundi), Ellie (b.1891 Murrurundi), Albert (b.1894, Lismore), Edgar (b.1896, East Maitland) and Florence (b.1901, Parkes). Lane was the nephew of NSW parliamentarian Albert Lane.

== Education ==
Before entering the ministry, Lane's father had studied theology at the Wesleyan Theological Institution at Newington House in Silverwater, New South Wales. When it came to educating his sons he chose Newington College, then at Stanmore, as their school. Lane commenced at Newington in 1912 following his brothers, Albert and Edgar, who had commenced in 1906 and 19011 respectively. Before leaving Newington in 1914 he had captained the 3rd XV rugby team. His older brother, Edgar Murray Lane, joined the 20th Infantry Battalion in 1916 and died at Bullecourt on 2 May 1917. He was buried in the Villers-Bretonneux Military Cemetery.

== Marriage and family ==
Lane married Myrra Livesey Binnie (b. 1914) in 1935 and the union produced seven children: Lynette, Peter, Ian, Jennifer, Rosemary, Robert and Margaret.

== Rugby career ==
Lane was a wing and claimed one international rugby cap for Australia in 1921. Later in the year he was selected to play in New Zealand but missed the first match. He played against Waikato for half the game but was injured, ending his tour. Lane then moved to Melbourne and became one of Victoria’s leading players. He captained the Victorian team in the 1926 game against the All Blacks and although his team was beaten convincingly, Lane scored a try against New Zealand.
