= Sport in Victoria =

Overview of sports traditions and activities in the Australian state of Victoria

The state of Victoria, Australia, has a strong sporting culture and includes many popular sports.

The most popular sports played in the state are basketball, football, cricket, shooting, soccer and netball. Horse racing joins that list as the most popular spectator sports.

== Team Sports ==
=== Australian rules football ===
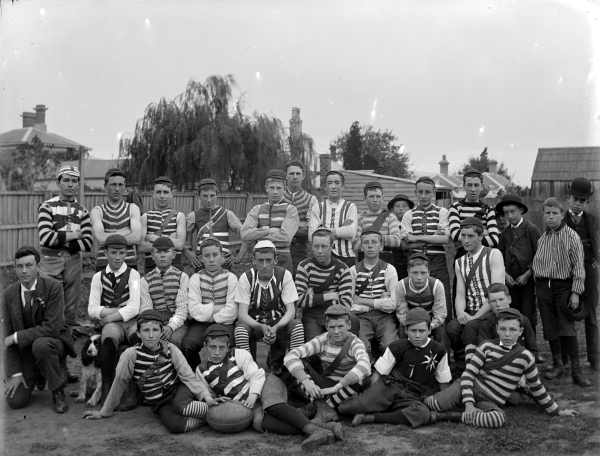
Australian rules football has a long history in Victoria, shown in this nineteenth-century junior football team from Geelong

In terms of both attendance and media coverage, Australian rules football is the most popular sport in the state. The participation rate of 4% is the third highest in the country with 223,999 players counted in 2004. Australian rules football originated in Melbourne in 1858. Ten of the eighteen Australian Football League clubs are based in Victoria, and the Melbourne Cricket Ground (MCG) is held by many to be the spiritual home of the game. Victoria hosted all Australian Football International Cup competitions from 2002 to 2017.

Current Teams

- Melbourne Football Club est 1858
- Geelong Football Club est 1859
- Carlton Football Club est 1864
- North Melbourne Football Club est 1869
- Essendon Football Club est 1871
- St. Kilda Football Club est 1873
- Western Bulldogs Football Club est 1877
- Richmond Football Club est 1885
- Collingwood Football Club est 1892
- Hawthorn Football Club est 1902

=== Basketball ===
Basketball has the highest participation rate in the state. Melbourne United (previously Melbourne Tigers) and South East Melbourne Phoenix are Melbourne's current teams in the National Basketball League (Australia). United have won the championship 4 times, in 1993, 1997, 2005-2006 and 2007-2008, with the Phoenix, being a new club, having yet to win a title. Both teams currently play home games at John Cain Arena in the centre of Melbourne, with SE Phoenix playing several games a year at the State Basketball Centre in the eastern Melbourne suburb of Wantirna South. Between 2010 and 2013, Basketball in Victoria experienced an increase in participation and at the time had more players in the state than any other sport.

==== Current Teams ====
- Melbourne United est 1984
- South East Melbourne Phoenix est 2018

=== Cricket ===
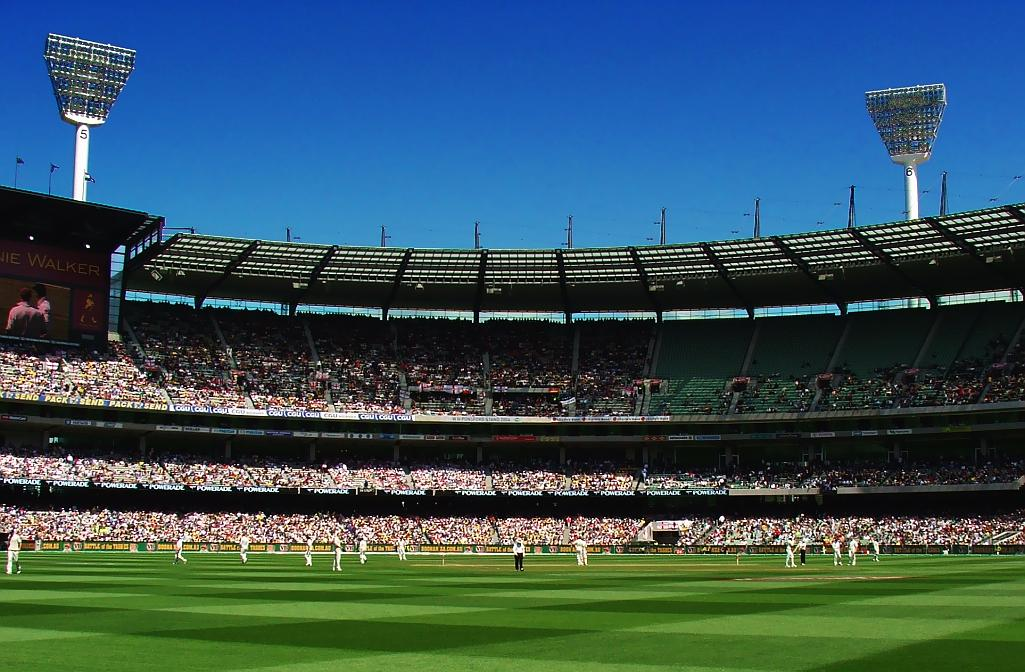
Cricket at the MCG

Cricket is also popular in Victoria. The governing body for the sport is Cricket Victoria which administers the 1,182 cricket clubs and 112,000 registered cricketers in Victoria, and 62,774 children involved in school-based competition. The Victorian cricket team is the state team for both men and women and currently competes in the Sheffield Shield, Marsh One-Day Cup and Women's National Cricket League.

Since 2011, the Melbourne Renegades and Melbourne Stars have competed in the Big Bash League, Australia's professional domestic Twenty20 series.

Current Teams

- Victorian cricket team est 1851
- Melbourne Renegades est 2011
- Melbourne Stars est 2011

=== Soccer ===
Soccer in Victoria is governed by the Football Victoria. It is particularly popular among migrant communities and has one of the highest sporting participation level in the state (after basketball). Victoria currently features two teams in the National A-League in both the men's and women's competitions.

Current Teams

- Melbourne Victory FC est 2004
- Melbourne City FC est 2009

Former Teams

- Western United FC 2018–2025

=== Rugby league ===
The predominantly Australian rules football-dominated state of Victoria didn't play host to much rugby league football, which was traditionally a New South Wales and Queensland-based game during the 20th century. Some representative games were played in Melbourne to gauge public interest in the sport in the early 1990s and the crowds were encouraging.

Travel back a few years and you find that, in rugby league circles, Melbourne was viewed as a great, succulent peach ready for picking. Almost 90,000 people had turned up to the MCG in 1994 to watch NSW play Queensland in a State of Origin match. In a period where the robust sport was focused on expansion, Melbourne loomed as the obvious next frontier. Then the code imploded.

— The Sunday Age, 1999

When the newly formed National Rugby League re-emerged in 1998, Melbourne Storm was part of the lineup of clubs. They have since become one of the most successful teams in the League and gained a significant following in their home state.

As of 2026, there are 18 amateur clubs based in Melbourne with further clubs in regional areas around the state. All clubs are part of NRL Victoria

Melbourne hosted several international matches including: Australia vs England during the 2008 Rugby League World Cup and again in the 2010 Four Nations Series, the 2010 ANZAC Test, which attracted a capacity crowd at the newly opened AAMI Park and several games at the 2017 Rugby League World Cup including a quarter final.

Current Teams

- Melbourne Storm est 1997

=== Motorsport ===
Motor racing has its Australian roots in Melbourne. One of the earlier motor races was held on a horse racing venue in Melbourne, but organised motor racing as we know it today began with the first running of the Australian Grand Prix, held on a rectangular dirt road course on the streets of Phillip Island in 1928. The Grand Prix wandered across the country in subsequent decades but today is held as part of the Formula One World Drivers Championship on the streets of inner Melbourne around Albert Park Lake. A modern Phillip Island Grand Prix Circuit hosts the Australian motorcycle Grand Prix. The state has more motor racing circuits than any other as well as providing the home base for more than half of the teams contesting the premier domestic motor racing series, V8 Supercar. Even New South Wales' signature motor race, the Bathurst 1000, has its roots in Victoria, having been first held as a 500-mile race at Phillip Island.

=== Netball ===
Netball is recognised as the largest female participation sport in Australia. In Victoria there are in excess of 105,000 registered participants, which does not include the tens of thousands of school children that participate in school netball programs annually.

Approximately 240 associations/groups affiliate with Netball Victoria on an annual basis. Affiliation provides access to netball events, programs and services as well as a pathway to State, National and International representation. Associations are geographically grouped into one of the 20 Regions, and then Regions are grouped into one of six Zones. 96% of the Netball Victoria membership is female. 55% of the membership resides in regional Victoria with the remaining 45% in the metropolitan suburbs in and around Melbourne. 62% of the Netball Victoria membership is aged seventeen (17) and under, with the majority of the remaining participants aged between eighteen and fifty. Victoria has two teams in the national Super Netball competition, the Melbourne Vixens and the Melbourne Mavericks.

Current Teams

- Melbourne Vixens est 2007
- Melbourne Mavericks est 2023

Former Teams

- Collingwood Magpies 2016–2023

=== Rugby union ===
According to the Australian Bureau of Statistics (2007), Victoria has very low rugby participation (less than 1%), dominated by amateur competition run by the Victorian Rugby Union, and participation in many private schools. However, international rugby matches attract large attendances, (e.g. 2003 Rugby World Cup, and sevens at the 2006 Commonwealth Games).

The Melbourne Rebels represented Victoria in the professional Super Rugby competition. Their formation was long-awaited in the state, the Victorian Rugby Union having bid twice previously for a licence, the first time in 1995, losing to the ACT Brumbies, and the second time in 2005, losing to the Western Force. Their bid for the 15th licence was successful in 2010, however, after 14 years, Rugby Australia pulled the Rebel's licence, citing excessive debts incurred in running the team as the reason. The team folded in 2024, leaving Australia's second largest city without a team in Super Rugby.

== Open Water Swimming ==
Open water swimming is a popular sport throughout Victoria. There is an ever-growing number of races right around Port Phillip Bay, Western Port Bay and Victoria's Ocean Coast. There are even a small number of races held in Rivers and Lakes.

The open water swim season in Victoria runs from early December to Mid-March of the following year. Several swims occur on Australia Day which also marks the "middle" of the season. The largest open water swim in Victoria (and As of 2009, the largest in the world) is the Lorne Pier to Pub. It attracts up to 4000 participants each year.

Some other well known swims include;

- Melbourne Swim Classic – Held on the first Saturday of March – St Kilda
- Swim for Your Life – Brighton
- Point Leo Swim Classic
- Portsea Swim Classic
- Mount Martha Australia Day Swim
- Big Bay Swim – Port Melbourne to Williamstown
- Bloody Big Swim – Frankston to Mornington
- Pier to Perignon – Sorrento to Portsea

The standard distance of the majority of the swims on the open water swim calendar is between 1 km and 2 km with the most common distance used being 1.2 km. Other swims however, cover much longer distances, including the Bloody Big Swim which covers 11.2 km.

Many famous swimmers are known to have participated in these swims including Olympic Gold medalists Kieren Perkins and Michael Klim. It is also a popular hobby of many other famous people including many AFL footballers, Australian cricketers including Simon O'Donnell and politicians including former Premiers of Victoria Steve Bracks and Ted Baillieu.

== Special events ==
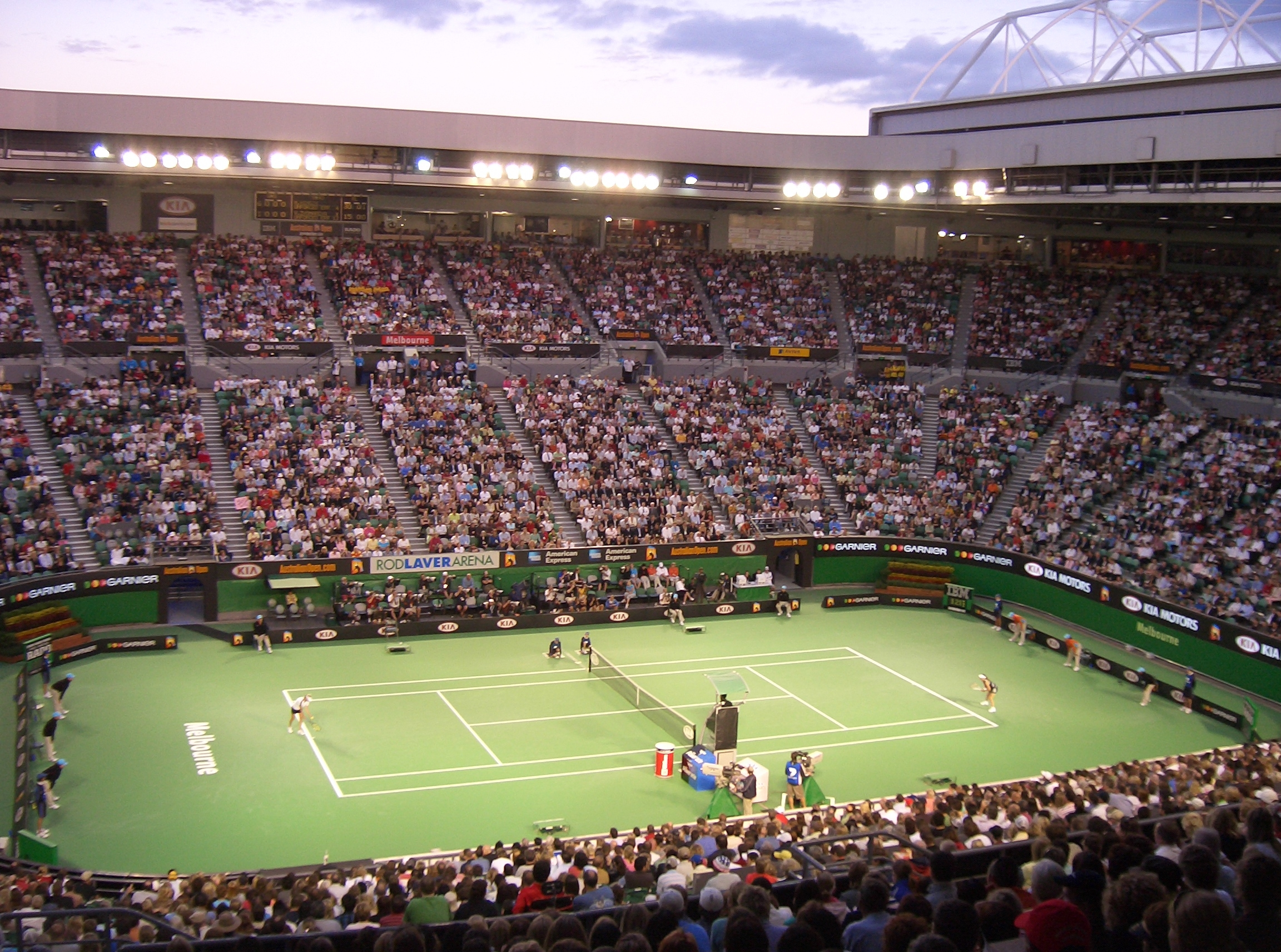
The 2006 Australian Open at Melbourne Park

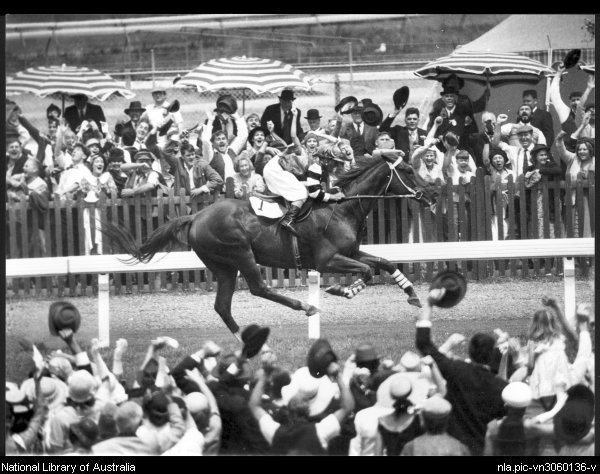
Portrayal of Phar Lap winning the 1930 Melbourne Cup, from the 1983 movie "Phar Lap"

Annually, Melbourne hosts the Australian Open tennis tournament, one of the four Grand Slam tournaments; the famous Melbourne Cup horse race; the 'Boxing Day' cricket test match held each year from 26 to 30 December at the Melbourne Cricket Ground; and the Australian Masters golf tournament. The Wallabies, Australia's national rugby union team, usually also play at least one Test annually in Melbourne.

Rivalling the Open early in the year, the Formula One World Drivers' Championship visits the Albert Park Street Circuit to contest the Australian Grand Prix (which was originally hosted by Adelaide, South Australia). Also Phillip Island hosts the Australian motorcycle Grand Prix for MotoGP bikes as well as a round of the World Superbike Championship, and Stawell is the home of Australia's most prestigious foot race, the Stawell Gift.

The MCG was the site of the first ever cricket test match between Australia and England in 1877, and has been the main stadium for the 1956 Summer Olympics and 2006 Commonwealth Games.

As well as Olympic and Commonwealth Games, Melbourne has hosted numerous sporting events which rotate host cities. Melbourne co-hosted the 2003 Rugby World Cup, including many pool matches as well as a quarter final – all of which were played at the Telstra Dome; hosted the 1975, 1979, 2003, 2007, 2009, 2011 and 2015 events of the basketball FIBA Oceania Championship; hosted the 2002 World Masters Games; the first city outside the United States to host the World Police and Fire Games in 1995, and the Presidents Cup golf tournament in 1999; and was the first city in the Southern Hemisphere to host the World Cup Polo Championship in 2001. The city has hosted FIFA World Cup qualifiers in both 1997 2001 and 2009

The state was to host the 2026 Commonwealth Games, regionally across Victoria and Melbourne until they were cancelled in July 2023.

== Major Sports Venues ==
=== Melbourne ===
| Venue | Capacity | Main sports |
|---|---|---|
| Flemington Racecourse | 110,000 | Horse racing |
| Albert Park | 100,000+ | Formula One & Supercars Championship |
| Melbourne Cricket Ground | 100,024 | Australian rules football, cricket, association football |
| Marvel Stadium | 56,347 | Australian rules football, cricket, association football, rugby league |
| Caulfield Racecourse | 50,000 | Horse racing |
| Sandown Racecourse | 50,000 | Horse racing, motorsport |
| Calder Park Raceway | 44,000 | Motorsport |
| Moonee Valley Racecourse | 40,000 | Horse racing |
| AAMI Park | 30,050 | Association football, Rugby league, Rugby union |
| Knights Stadium | 15,000 | Association football |
| Rod Laver Arena | 14,820 | Tennis, Basketball, Netball, Swimming |
| Ikon Park | 13,000 | Australian rules football |
| Lakeside Stadium | 12,000 | Association football, athletics, gridiron |
| Olympic Village | 12,000 | Association football |
| Whitten Oval | 12,000 | Australian rules football |
| John Cain Arena | 10,500 | Tennis, Netball, Cycling, Gymnastics, Basketball |
| Victoria Park | 10,000 | Australian rules football |
| Epping Stadium | 10,000 | Association football |
| Green Gully Reserve | 10,000 | Association football |
| Junction Oval | 10,000 | Cricket |
| Kooyong Stadium | 8,500 | Tennis |
| Margaret Court Arena | 7,500 | Tennis, netball, basketball |
| Melbourne Ballpark | 5,000 | Baseball, Softball |
| State Netball & Hockey Centre | 3,500 (1,000 for Hockey) | Netball, hockey, basketball |
| State Basketball Centre | 3,200 | Basketball |
| The Home of the Matildas | 3,000 | Association football |
| Dandenong Stadium | 2,500 | Basketball, Volleyball |
| Melbourne Sports and Aquatic Centre | 2,000 | Swimming |
| O'Brien Icehouse | 1,500 | Ice hockey |
| Darebin Velodrome | 1,250 | Cycling |

=== Outside Melbourne ===
| Venue | Capacity | Main sports |
|---|---|---|
| Phillip Island Grand Prix Circuit | 90,000 | Motorcycle racing, touring car racing |
| Kardinia Park | 40,000 | Australian rules football |
| Winton Motor Raceway | 30,000 | Motorsport |
| Eureka Stadium | 11,000 | Australian rules football |
| Bendigo Stadium | 4,000 | Basketball, Netball |
| Ballarat Sports Events Centre | 3,000 | Basketball, Netball |

== Current professional bodies in national competitions ==
=== Melbourne ===
| Club | League | Venue | Established | Premierships/Championships |
|---|---|---|---|---|
| Carlton Football Club | Australian Football League; AFL Women's | Marvel Stadium | 1864 | 16 |
| Team 18 | Supercars Championship | Sandown Raceway | 2013 | 0 |
| Collingwood Football Club | Australian Football League; AFL Women's | Melbourne Cricket Ground | 1892 | 16 |
| Essendon Football Club | Australian Football League; AFL Women's | Marvel Stadium | 1871 | 16 |
| Garry Rogers Motorsport | Australian S5000 Championship; TCR Australia Touring Car Series | Sandown Raceway | 1989 | 0 |
| Hawthorn Football Club | Australian Football League; AFL Women's | Melbourne Cricket Ground | 1902 | 13 |
| Grove Racing | Supercars Championship | Winton Motor Raceway | 2009 | 0 |
| Melbourne Aces | Ulsan-KBO Fall League | Melbourne Ballpark | 2010 | 0 |
| Melbourne Football Club | Australian Football League; AFL Women's | Melbourne Cricket Ground | 1858 | 13 |
| Melbourne City FC | A-League Men; A-League Women | AAMI Park | 2009 | 2 |
| Melbourne Ice | Australian Ice Hockey League | O'Brien Icehouse | 2000 | 4 |
| Melbourne Mavericks | Super Netball | John Cain Arena, Margaret Court Arena, Rod Laver Arena | 2023 | 0 |
| Melbourne Mustangs | Australian Ice Hockey League | O'Brien Icehouse | 2010 | 1 |
| Melbourne Renegades | KFC Big Bash League; Women's Big Bash League | Marvel Stadium | 2011 | 1 |
| Melbourne Stars | KFC Big Bash League; Women's Big Bash League | Melbourne Cricket Ground, Junction Oval | 2011 | 0 |
| Melbourne Storm | National Rugby League | AAMI Park, Marvel Stadium | 1997 | 4 |
| Melbourne United | National Basketball League | John Cain Arena, Margaret Court Arena, State Netball & Hockey Centre | 1931 | 5 |
| Melbourne Victory | A-League Men; A-League Women | AAMI Park, Marvel Stadium | 2004 | 4 |
| Melbourne Vixens | Super Netball | John Cain Arena, Margaret Court Arena, Rod Laver Arena | 2008 | 2 |
| North Melbourne Football Club | Australian Football League; AFL Women's | Marvel Stadium | 1869 | 4 |
| Richmond Football Club | Australian Football League; AFL Women's | Melbourne Cricket Ground | 1885 | 11 |
| South East Melbourne Phoenix | National Basketball League | John Cain Arena, State Basketball Centre | 2018 | 0 |
| Southside Flyers | Women's National Basketball League | State Basketball Centre | 1992 | 5 |
| St Kilda Football Club | Australian Football League; AFL Women's | Marvel Stadium | 1873 | 1 |
| Victorian cricket team | Marsh One-Day Cup, Sheffield Shield, Women's National Cricket League | Melbourne Cricket Ground / Junction Oval | 1851 | 28 (SS), 4 (T20 Bash), 5 (Ryobi One Day Cup) |
| Walkinshaw Andretti United | Supercars Championship | Winton Motor Raceway | 1988 | 6 |
| Western Bulldogs | Australian Football League; AFL Women's | Marvel Stadium and Eureka Stadium Ballarat | 1883 | 2 |

=== Outside Melbourne ===
| Club | League | Venue | Established | Premierships/Championships |
|---|---|---|---|---|
| Bendigo Spirit | Women's National Basketball League | Bendigo Stadium | 2007 | 2 |
| Geelong Football Club | Australian Football League | Kardinia Park | 1859 | 10 |
| Geelong Venom | Women's National Basketball League | Geelong Arena | 1984 (as Bulleen Boomers) | 2 |
| Tickford Racing | Supercars Championship | Winton Motor Raceway | 1989 | 2 |

== See also ==
- Australian rules football in Victoria
- Rugby league in Victoria
