= Ian Dick (rugby union) =

Rugby union player from Northern Ireland

- Full name: Charles John Dick
- Born: 26 January 1937 (age 89) Ballymena, Northern Ireland
- School: Ballymena Academy
- University: Queen's University Belfast
- Notable relative: Jimmy Dick (brother)
- Occupation: Medical practitioner

Rugby union career
- Position: Lock / No. 8
International career
Years	Team	Apps	(Points)
1961–63	Ireland	8	(0)

Charles John "Ian" Dick (born 26 January 1937) is an Irish former international rugby union player.

The son of a Ballymena doctor, Dick attended Ballymena Academy and was one of three brothers to represent Ulster, along with Jim and Robin. He played in the Ulster side that played against the 1957–58 Wallabies at Ravenhill.

Dick, a forward, played for Ballymena RFC and Queen's University. Between 1961 and 1963, Dick was capped eight times for Ireland, as a lock in his first year, then utilised as a number eight. His Ireland career included the 1961 tour of South Africa, although he didn't play a capped match. He also toured with the Barbarians.

== See also ==
- List of Ireland national rugby union players
