= Melbourne University Rugby Football Club =

Australian rugby union club, based in Melbourne, VIC

Melbourne University Rugby Football Club (MURFC)
- Union: Australian Rugby Union
- Branch: Victorian Rugby Union
- Nickname: Uni or The Students
- Founded: 1926; 100 years ago
- Region: Melbourne, Inner-North (Parkville)
- Ground(s): HG Smith Oval, Parkville (Capacity: 3,000)
- League: Dewar Shield
- 2024: 7th
Team kit

Official website
- melbourneunirugby.com.au

Melbourne University Rugby Football Club (MURFC), the oldest rugby union club in Victoria, is a Foundation Club of the Victorian Rugby Union (VRU) in 1926. MURFC is the only club from that time still in its original form and ever present in the Victorian Premier Division. An earlier MURFC club had existed from 1909 to 1912.

== Teams and players ==
MURFC fields men's and women's teams in the Senior Divisions across First, Second and Third Grades, a Women’s team, in addition to a Colts (U20) team and an over 35’s “Gents” team. MURFC also run 7s teams over the summer. Several recent MURFC players have been recruited into professional teams, notably including current Melbourne Rebels and Wallabies hooker Jordan Uelese.

Playing membership is not restricted to University of Melbourne students.

=== Senior Men's ===
Men's Premier Division teams:

- Premier 1
- Premier 2
- Premier 3

These teams compete for the Dewar Shield in Victoria's top-tier men's grade competition.

=== Senior Women's ===
Women's Premier Division teams:

- Premier 1

These teams compete for the Lindroth Cup in Victoria's top-tier women's grade competition.

=== Colts (U20) ===
Men's age-restricted Colts (U20) Division teams:

- Colts 1
- Colts 2

=== Youth Girls ===
Women's age-restricted competition teams:

- Premier 1

=== Masters ===
Men's social competition teams:

- Gents 1

Teams in this grade compete for pride.

== Identity ==
Nicknamed Uni or The Students, the club plays at HG Smith Oval (and surrounding fields) in Parkville.

MURFC typically fields a strong contingent of local and international players, with Ireland, England, Wales, Scotland, France, New Zealand and the Pacific Islands strongly represented.

The club's colours are black & blue. However in the park have utilized Black, blue and white with a strip featuring prominent blue/white hoops with black trim.

=== Club song ===
After a winning performance, MURFC men's teams typically perform the celebratory club song.

We are the team from University, and rugby union is our game.

When you come to play the Black and Blue, the Black and Blue will send you away.

We grin when we win. And when we do, you'll hear us sing:

We live — and die — to score, one more try!

We are the winning team. Aye!

== Association with University of Melbourne ==
The club maintains close ties with the university. Particularly during the off/pre-season, and for various strength & conditioning activities throughout the year, training sessions are often carried out on campus, making use of the University of Melbourne's extensive sporting facilities.

Students of the university that play with MURFC are eligible to compete at the annual Australian University Games; the club serves as a major conduit for student athletes wishing to participate in the Games, and is typically responsible for the training and organisation of the rugby team(s) sent to represent the University of Melbourne.

== Sponsorship ==
Buildcorp became Principal Sponsor of MURFC in 2017 season, with a prominent logo featured on the chest of senior grade jerseys.

== Notable players ==
- Edward "Weary" Dunlop (Wallabies)
- Matt Cockbain (Wallabies, Reds)
- Geoff Vaughan (Wallabies)
- Fereti Sa'aga (Melbourne Rebels)
- Rob Leota (Melbourne Rebels)
- Jordan Uelese (Wallabies, Melbourne Rebels)
- Sam Jeffries (Melbourne Rebels)
- Jonah Placid (Melbourne Rebels)
- Dom Shipperley (Melbourne Rebels)

== History ==
=== Origins ===
In 1908, the Sydney University Football Club (SUFC) challenged the students of the University of Melbourne to play a game of rugby union. A core group of players with a motivation to compete more regularly lead to the formation of the Club in the following year; officially founded in 1909, the Melbourne University Rugby Football Club (MURFC) was the oldest of five Foundation Clubs to establish the Victorian Rugby Union. This first inter-varsity game and the subsequent founding of MURFC was commemorated in 2009 with an exhibition match between the Melbourne and Sydney university sides, each wearing heritage jerseys in a nod to their shared history. MURFC won its first Premiership in 1910, and is unique in having fielded a team in the top-tier of Victorian club rugby in every season since its foundation.The MURC and the club competition ceased to exist after the 1912 season.

=== Rugby league and Australian Universities honours (1923-25) ===
With no club rugby union being played since 1912 or during World War One, in 1923 a club rugby league competition was established under a new body called the Victorian Rugby Football League (VRFL), and clubs formed included a Melbourne University Rugby Football League Club (MURLFC). The club took part in 1924 in an inter-varsity rugby league tri-series with the Sydney University RLFC and the University of Queensland RC. Also in 1924 three students from the MURLFC were selected for the 'Combined Australian Universities' rugby league team, including P. Stott against England in Sydney, and K. Fraser and J. Love in the squad that toured New Zealand.

=== Founding of the Victorian Rugby Union (1926) ===
After playing three seasons of rugby league, in early 1926 the VRFL committee voted to switch codes and became the Victorian Rugby Union. The existing clubs then gave effect to the change becoming or founding as rugby union clubs, including the present day MURFC, Melbourne RUFC and Kiwi Hawthorn RUFC (although the latter two clubs were each involved in mergers in 1939 and 1987 respectively).
