= Dennis Scott (rugby union) =

Rugby union player from Northern Ireland

- Born: 19 November 1933 Belfast, Northern Ireland

Rugby union career
- Position: Wing-forward
International career
Years	Team	Apps	(Points)
1961–62	Ireland	3	(0)

Dennis Scott (born 19 November 1933) is an Irish former international rugby union player.

Born in Belfast, Scott was a Malone and Ulster wing-forward, capped three times for Ireland.

Scott made his debut against France at Lansdowne Road in 1961 and had to play most of the match as a fullback, as part of a series of positional changes made after an injury to fly-half Mick English. His next cap came against the Springboks on the 1961 tour of South Africa and he featured once in the 1962 Five Nations.

== See also ==
- List of Ireland national rugby union players
