= Harlequin Rugby Club =

Australian rugby union team formed in 1928

(Australia) Harlequin Rugby Club
- Union: Australian Rugby Union
- Branch: Victorian Rugby Union
- Nickname: Quins
- Founded: 1928
- Location: Melbourne, Australia
- Region: Melbourne Eastern suburbs - Ashwood
- Ground: Ashwood Reserve (Capacity: 3,000)
- President: Brock Parker
- Director of Rugby: Neil Carter
- Coach(es): Chris Allen, Dave Palu
- Captain: Jack Fitzgerald
- Most caps: Neil Carter
- League: Dewar Shield
- 2024: 3rd
Team kit

Official website
- www.quins.com.au

The Harlequin Rugby Club is an Australian rugby union club formed in 1928. Originally membership was restricted to people born in Britain, but this restriction was removed by the 1950s. Although Rugby is the main sport, the club still plays friendly cricket, golf and darts. One of Melbourne's largest and oldest clubs, Quins promote the ethos of running with the ball in hand. The club has teams in all Junior age groups (U6 to U18), youth girls 7s (U11 and U15) and six Senior teams including a women's team. 1st Grade have been "Dewar Shield" Premiers 6 times in the last 11 seasons (2013, 2014, 2015, 2017, 2022 and 2023), 2nd Grade have been Premiers 3 of the last 5 seasons and the Colts U20 have been Premiers 7 times in the last decade. The club claimed their 10th consecutive Cowper Shield Club Championship in 2026 as the best overall performing club in Victoria across Seniors and Juniors.

Boasting Melbourne's best rugby facilities, the club's main field in 2019 underwent a $1 million upgrade to create a premium national standard playing surface coupled with a full replay electronic scoreboard being installed and regularly hosts Melbourne Rebels, Melbourne Rising and Rugby Victoria representative teams games and training.

== Club colours ==
According to the constitution the club colours are Black, Maroon, Sage Green and Pale Blue. These have been further defined very specifically by the club as being:

Colour name	PMS	RGB	HTML	Example	Note
Black	Pantone Black	26 23 27	#1A171B		
Maroon	209c	117 38 61	#75263D		
Sage green	361c	30 181 58	#1EB53A		
Pale blue	278c	153 186 221	#99BADD		
Gold	1235	252 181 20	#FCB514		This colour is only to be used when gold thread is used to embroider the Jester on jacket pockets and the like.
