= 1960 Five Nations Championship =

Rugby union competition

- Date: 9 January - 9 April 1960
- Countries: England; Ireland; France; Scotland; Wales

Tournament statistics
- Champions: England and France
- Triple Crown: England (14th title)
- Matches played: 10

The 1960 Five Nations Championship was the thirty-first series of the rugby union Five Nations Championship. Including the previous incarnations as the Home Nations and Five Nations, this was the sixty-sixth series of the northern hemisphere rugby union championship. Ten matches were played between 9 January and 9 April. It was contested by England, France, Ireland, Scotland and Wales.

The championship was jointly won by England and France. Both teams beat Ireland, Scotland and Wales and the France-England game was drawn 3-3, giving both teams a total of 7 points in the final table. There was no tie-break in the Five Nations at the time and the championship was shared. England's three wins gave them the Triple Crown for the fourteenth time; they would not win it again until the 1980 Five Nations Championship.

== Participants ==
The teams involved were:

Nation	Venue	City	Captain
England	Twickenham	London	Dickie Jeeps
France	Stade Olympique Yves-du-Manoir	Colombes	François Moncla
Ireland	Lansdowne Road	Dublin	Andy Mulligan/Ronnie Dawson
Scotland	Murrayfield	Edinburgh	Arthur Smith/Gordon Waddell
Wales	National Stadium	Cardiff	Rhys Williams/Bryn Meredith/Onllwyn Brace

== Table ==
Pos	Team	Pld	W	D	L	PF	PA	PD	Pts
1	France	4	3	1	0	55	28	+27	7
1	England	4	3	1	0	46	26	+20	7
3	Wales	4	2	0	2	32	39	−7	4
4	Scotland	4	1	0	3	29	47	−18	2
5	Ireland	4	0	0	4	25	47	−22	0

== Results ==
1960-01-09

Scotland	11–13	France

Edinburgh

1960-01-16

England	14–6	Wales

London

1960-02-06

Wales	8–0	Scotland

Cardiff

1960-02-13

England	8–5	Ireland

London

1960-02-27

France	3–3	England

Paris

1960-02-27

Ireland	5–6	Scotland

Dublin

1960-03-12

Ireland	9–10	Wales

Dublin

1960-03-19

Scotland	12–21	England

Edinburgh

1960-03-26

Wales	8–16	France

Cardiff

1960-04-09

France	23–6	Ireland

Paris
