= Tuppy Diack =

New Zealand rugby union player (1930–2025)

- Born: Ernest Sinclair Diack; 22 July 1930 Invercargill, New Zealand
- Died: 16 May 2025 (aged 94) Dunedin, New Zealand
- School: Gore High School
- University: University of Otago
- Occupation: Schoolteacher

Rugby union career
- Position: Wing
Provincial / State sides
Years	Team	Apps	(Points)
1951–53, 55–64	Otago	101	(746)
1954	Southland	7	
International career
Years	Team	Apps	(Points)
1955–60	NZ Universities	18	
1959	New Zealand	1	(0)

Ernest Sinclair "Tuppy" Diack (22 July 1930 – 16 May 2025) was a New Zealand rugby union player. A wing three-quarter, Diack represented Otago and, briefly, Southland at a provincial level. He played one match for the New Zealand national side, the All Blacks, namely the second test against the touring 1959 British Lions.

== Biography ==
The first player to make 100 appearances for Otago, Diack played 101 matches and scored 746 points for the province. He was the leading points scorer in New Zealand first-class rugby in three consecutive seasons, from 1958 to 1960.

After retiring from playing in 1964, Diack remained active in rugby as a coach, selector and administrator. He served as coach and president of the Otago University Rugby Club, and was made a life member of the club. A selector for the New Zealand Universities team for 13 years, he also coached the team on a tour of Japan. Diack was president of the Otago Rugby Football Union in 2005, and was also a life member of the union.

A schoolteacher, Diack taught at John McGlashan College in Dunedin for 28 years, including 13 years serving as deputy principal.

Diack died in Dunedin on 16 May 2025, at the age of 94.
