= Sigurd Slåttebrekk =

Norwegian musician

Sigurd Slåttebrekk (born 6 January 1968) is a Norwegian classical pianist and professor of piano at the Norwegian Academy of Music. In addition to his musical career, he has worked extensively as a producer and creator of children's content through the company Animando, with projects such as Elias the Little Rescue Boat and The Music Factory.

Slåttebrekk's piano recordings have garnered extensive national and international acclaim. In 2022, Gramophone magazine ranked his 2005 recording of Edvard Grieg's Piano Concerto in A Minor as the best among more than 400 versions in recording history. This Simax recording, featuring Michail Jurowski and the Oslo Philharmonic, was released as part of the commemorative collection Norwegian Heartland for the centenary of Norway's independence from Sweden.

Among other accolades, Slåttebrekk won the 1997 Spellemann Award in the classical music category for the album Maurice Ravel: Music for Piano and received the Fartein Valen Prize in 2012.

Slåttebrekk holds a part-time position as a professor of piano at the Norwegian Academy of Music, where he first became a faculty member in 2000. Between 2005 and 2010, he conducted research on romantic performance practices as documented in early recordings, focusing particularly on Edvard Grieg's 1903 recordings of his own works. This research culminated in the release of the project and album Chasing the Butterfly.

As the CEO and producer of Animando AS, Slåttebrekk has led the company to significant recognition. Notable achievements include the 2024 Thea Award for The Music Factory in the Attraction Limited Budget category and the Amanda Award for Best Children's and Youth Film in 2017 for Anchors Up (Elias).

Slåttebrekk received his early piano training from his mother, Karin Helene Slåttebrekk, and Ingeborg Songe-Møller. He later studied with Einar Steen-Nøkleberg at the Norwegian Academy of Music, Jerome Lowenthal at The Juilliard School, Kazuhiko Nakajima at the Tokyo College of Music, and completed the soloist program at the Hochschule für Musik, Tanz und Medien in Hanover. Additionally, he studied with the renowned pianist Lazar Berman for a period.
