= John Carroll (rugby union) =

Australia international rugby union player (1934-1998)

- Born: John Hugh Carroll; 20 March 1934 Sydney, Australia
- Died: 30 March 1998 (aged 64) Sydney
- School: Newington College
- Occupation: Stock broker/copra plantation manager

Rugby union career
- Position: Second Row
International career
Years	Team	Apps	(Points)
1958–1959	Australia	8	

John Hugh Carroll (20 March 1934 – 30 March 1998) was an Australian Rugby Union player who represented the Wallabies eight times.

== Early life ==
Carroll was born in Sydney and attended Newington College (1946–1949). He played in the juniors at Mosman before joining the Norths in the second row.

== Representative career ==
At the age of twenty four Carroll played in his first test match in New Zealand against the New Zealand Māori rugby union team. He retired from representative rugby due to a knee injury.

== Business life ==
Carroll operated a copra plantation in Papua New Guinea during the 1960s and 1970s.
