= Anchors Up =

2017 Norwegian 3D animated film

- Directed by: Simen Alsvik; William John Ashurst
- Screenplay by: Karsten Fullu; Simen Alsvik
- Produced by: Sigurd Slåttebrekk
- Edited by: Simen Malmø
- Music by: Gaute Storaas
- Production companies: Animando AS; Steamheads Studios
- Release date: 6 October 2017
- Running time: 75 minutes
- Country: Norway
- Language: Norwegian

Anchors Up (Norwegian: Elias og Storegaps Hemmelighet) also released as Anchors Up - Boats to the Rescue, is a 2017 Norwegian 3D animated film directed by Simen Alsvik and William John Ashurst, from a screenplay by Karsten Fullu and Alsvik.

== Voice cast ==
=== English voice cast ===
- Cameron Simpson as Elias
- Lucy Carolan as Stella
- Danna Davis as Queen of the Sea
- Dermot Magennis as Vinnie, Billy Bob and Cruiser
- Marcus Lamb as Grabber, Henry, Gull and Flash
- Paul Tylak as Trigger, Bobby and additional voices
- Roger Gregg as Big Blinky, Gerald and Goliath
- Doireann Ní Chorragáin as Gill and Swifty
- Aileen Mythen as Dippy, Helinor and Brenda
- Jim Elliot as Trawler, Racer and Speedster
- Niamh McCann as Crane, Little Jane, Marcus and Martinus
- Ian Coppinger as Terry and Trolley
- Ulises Olvera-Arroyo as the Spanish Cargo Ships
