= Danny Kay =

- Full name: Robert Cecil Kay
- Born: 16 March 1935 Glebe, Sydney, Australia
- Died: 5 March 2011 (aged 75)

Rugby union career
- Position: Centre
International career
Years	Team	Apps	(Points)
1958–59	Australia	2	(0)

Robert Cecil Kay (16 March 1935 — 5 March 2011) was an Australian rugby union international.

Born in Sydney, Kay was a Victoria-based centre, capped twice for the Wallabies. He made his debut in a win over the All Blacks at Lancaster Park, Christchurch in the 2nd Test of the 1958 tour of New Zealand. An ankle injury cost him his place for the 3rd Test and his second cap came the following year in Sydney against the British Lions.

Kay, a carpenter and joiner by trade, was a soldier in the Australian Army with the Royal Australian Engineers. He was involved in operations in Sabah during the Indonesia–Malaysia confrontation in 1966 and 1967, then served in Vietnam as a staff sergeant in the 17th Construction Squadron between March 1969 and March 1970.

== See also ==
- List of Australia national rugby union players
