= Melbourne Rugby Union Football Club =

Australian rugby union club, based in Melbourne, VIC

(Australia) Melbourne RUFC
- Full name: Melbourne Rugby Union Football Club
- Union: Australian Rugby Union
- Branch: Victorian Rugby Union
- Nickname: Unicorns
- Founded: 1926; 100 years ago
- Location: 603 Orrong Rd, Armadale, Victoria
- Ground(s): Romanis Reserve, Orrong Park, Orrong Rd, Prahran, Victoria
- 2024: 6th
Team kit

Official website
- www.melbournerugby.com.au

The Melbourne Rugby Union Football Club (Melbourne RUFC) is a rugby union football club based in Melbourne, Australia. Nicknamed the Unicorns, the club plays at Romanis Reserve in Prahran and was founded in 1926. The club's colours are green, blue and gold.

== History ==
Officially established in 1926, Melbourne RUFC is one of the three oldest clubs in Victoria (along with Melbourne University RFC and Kiwi Hawthorn RUFC). In March 1939 the club merged with the Old Boys RUC, retaining the Melbourne name and Old Boys' colours.

The original Melbourne RUFC was founded in 1888 to enable matches against the British Lions touring team and the New Zealand Natives side. The club continued to play locally until it went defunct after the 1891 season. A new club bearing the Melbourne name operated from 1895 to 1899. A third iteration Melbourne RUFC was founded in 1909 as part of a new club competition, however this too folded at the end of the 1912 season.Club rugby union in Melbourne was a somewhat stop start affair until the formation of the Victorian Rugby Union (VRU) in 1926, not being played at all across 1891–1892, 1901–1908 and 1913–1925. The current Melbourne RUFC was founded under the VRU in 1926.

During the period 1930–35, Dave Cowper became the club's and Victoria's first Australian international representative and, in 1933, captained Australia against the Springboks in South Africa.

In the early days of the late 1920s and 1930s, Melbourne Rugby Club's motto of that era was "Praemia Post Habeas Ludo" (loosely translated as "After the Battle, Enjoy the Prize"). Following the club's amalgamation in 1939 with Old Boys Rugby Club and prior to his departure, that year, to military duties in World War II, the club accepted the recommendation of club member Weary Dunlop, that the rampant unicorn become the club emblem along with his suggested new club motto "Never a step backward"

Both the emblem and the motto along with the club's victory song "We're on the march with Melbourne's Army" are still deeply embedded in the Melbourne Rugby Club 'psyche.' Another mark of recognition of Melbourne RUFC was introduced by R.I. Kingman in the early Sixties. The sound of 'Who's that man with the big red nose' has become synonymous with MRUFC throughout Victorian rugby circles.

In 1959 MRUFC gained the rights to play on Romanis Reserve. Commonly known as Orrong Park, it is situated on Orrong Road, between High Street and Malvern Roads, Prahran.

In recent years the Melbourne Rugby club has enjoyed some extraordinary success. In 2009, the club's centenary year the first grade side came from last to first, to win the Dewar Shield for the club's 15th time (the most of any club in Victoria). On 11 September 2010, the club went one step further with all 4 senior sides winning their respective competitions. The first club to ever do this in Victoria and second in Australia.

=== Melbourne rugby league club and founding of the Victorian Rugby Union (1923-26) ===
With no club rugby union being played since 1912 or during World War One, in 1923 a club rugby league competition was established under a new body called the Victorian Rugby Football League (VRL)., and the clubs formed included a Melbourne Rugby Football League Club (MRFLC).After three seasons of rugby league competitions, in early 1926 the VRL committee voted to switch codes and became the Victorian Rugby Union. The existing clubs then gave effect to the change becoming or founding as rugby union clubs, including the present day Melbourne RUFC, Melbourne University and Kiwis (now Kiwi Hawthorn RUFC).
