= Andy Mulligan (rugby union) =

Irish rugby union player

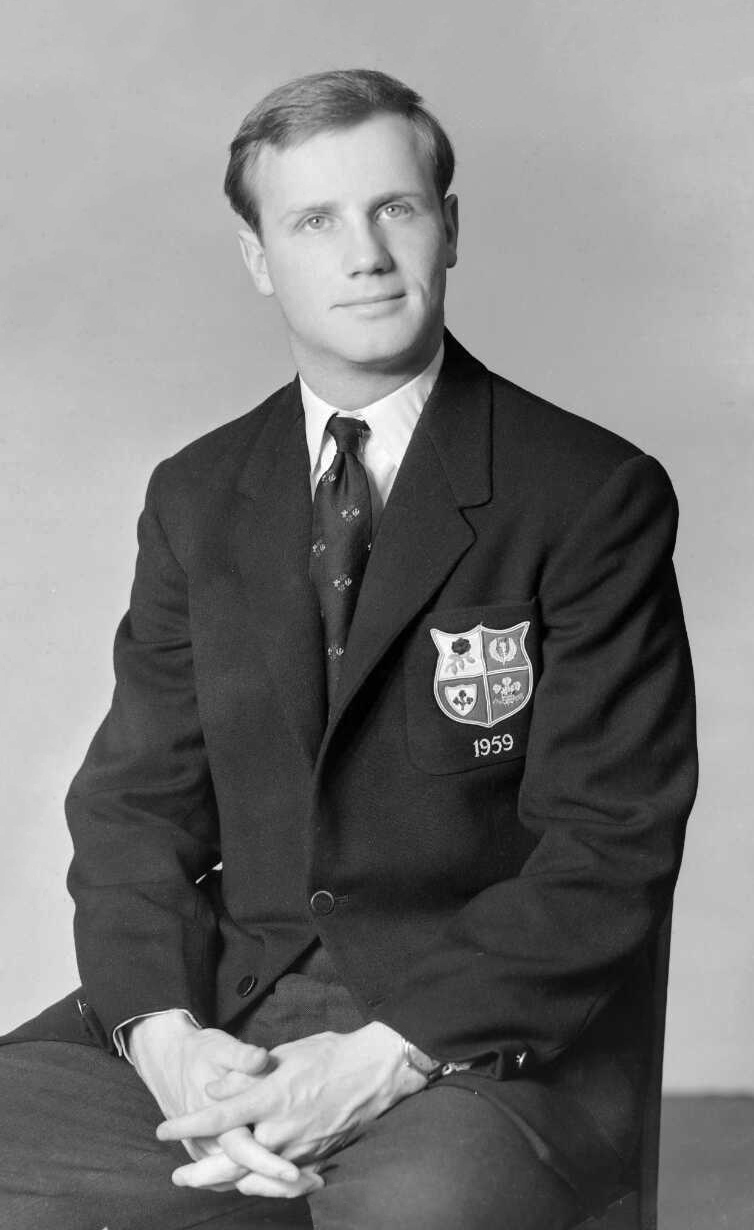
- Mulligan in New Zealand in 1959
- Born: 4 February 1936 Kasauli, India
- Died: 24 February 2001 (aged 65) Medford, Oregon, U.S.

Rugby union career
International career
Years	Team	Apps	(Points)
1956-1961	Ireland		
1959	British & Irish Lions		

Andrew Armstrong Mulligan (4 February 1936 – 24 February 2001) was a rugby union international who captained Ireland and the British & Irish Lions, playing at scrum-half.

== Rugby football career ==
Educated at Gresham's School, Holt from 1945 to 1954, he captained the School's First XV in 1953-1954. He then attended Magdalene College, Cambridge.

He played 22 internationals for Ireland. His first was against France on 28 January 1956, and his last against South Africa in 1961.

Mulligan was three times captain of Ireland, and he also captained the British & Irish Lions against Manawatu on the 1959 tour. He also played varsity rugby for Cambridge University and was captain of London Irish.

In 1964 he wrote the book All Blacks Tour 1963-4, a complete record of the New Zealand tour to Britain, Ireland, and France.

== Later career ==
When he retired from international rugby, he moved to France where he began a career in journalism. He initially wrote sport-focused articles for the Observer, then moved to news reporting for that newspaper and the Daily Telegraph from Paris, later becoming bureau chief for The Observer in Paris. He also worked in television, including for ITN's News At Ten and Panorama.

When Ireland joined the European Economic Community in January 1973, Andy Mulligan first became head of the division responsible for general reports, but his journalism experience led to the role of director of press and information at the EEC delegation in Washington in 1974.

For the next seven years he worked with the aim of informing the American public, and especially centres of power and learning, about the EEC. One of his achievements was the setting up of a professionally produced and written magazine, Europe, to replace the free publication which had been mainly distributed on campuses.

Andy Mulligan also organised valuable transatlantic seminars, bringing together media, diplomats and experts. One of the most notable was at Waterville, County Kerry, in 1979, during the Irish European Commission Presidency, which was attended by the then Taoiseach, Jack Lynch.

After leaving the Commission in 1983, Mulligan and his family remained in the US, where he set up Mulligan Communications and European Media with the ambition of bridging the media gap between the US and Europe.

== Personal life ==
Andy Mulligan married Pia Ursula Schioler in 1964. They had two sons, Finn and Joachim and two daughters, Maia and Katrina.
