= Syd Millar =

GB Lions & Ireland international rugby union player (1934–2023)

Syd Millar CBE

Chairman of the International Rugby Board
- In office 2003–2007
- Deputy: Silas Nkanunu; Bob Tuckey
- Preceded by: Vernon Pugh
- Succeeded by: Bernard Lapasset

Vice-chairman of the IRB
- In office 16 September 2002 – 31 December 2003
- Preceded by: Rob Fisher
- Succeeded by: Silas Nkanunu
- Born: Sydney Millar; 23 May 1934 Ballymena, Northern Ireland
- Died: 10 December 2023 (aged 89)
- Height: 1.83 m (6 ft 0 in)
- Weight: 100 kg (15 st 10 lb; 220 lb)
- School: Ballymena Academy
- University: Belfast Nautical College

Rugby union career
- Position: Prop
Amateur team(s)
Years	Team	Apps	(Points)
1950–1972	Ballymena		
1957–65, 67–71	Ulster		
1959–1971	Barbarians F.C.		
International career
Years	Team	Apps	(Points)
1958–1970	Ireland	37	(0)
1959–1968	British and Irish Lions	9	(0)
Coaching career
- Years: Team
- 1973–1975: Ireland
- 1974: British and Irish Lions

Sydney Millar CBE (23 May 1934 – 10 December 2023) was a Northern Irish rugby union prop who played for Ballymena RFC and Ulster and international rugby for Ireland and the British Lions. After retiring from playing rugby he became a rugby coach and a rugby administrator. He became chairman of the Irish Rugby Union in 1995 and from 2003 until 2007 was chairman of the International Rugby Board. Former Lions captain Willie John McBride stated that Millar had given "his whole life to the game".

== Early life ==
Millar was born in Ballymena in Northern Ireland, the eldest of six children. He spent a period away as a sea cadet.

== Rugby ==
Millar played at outside-half at school. A highly technical prop, he focused on the set-piece and could play on either side of the scrum at the highest level.

=== Playing career ===
Millar played for his home town club, Ballymena RFC.

Millar first played for Ireland in 1958 and went on to win 37 caps as a prop. This included a four-year gap when he was out of favour. His last international was in 1970.

Millar played 39 games for the British and Irish Lions, including 9 internationals, on 3 tours. Although tighthead was said to be his preference, he packed down at loosehead in both the 1959 and 1962 Lions series. He also played on the 1968 tour.

Millar also appeared 10 times for the Barbarians, including a win over the 1961 South African team.

=== Coach ===
Millar was appointed coach of Ulster in March 1972, succeeding Ken Armstrong. In July the same year, he was named coach of the Ireland national team, succeeding Ronnie Dawson. He was succeeded as Ulster coach by Maurice Crabbe. He coached Ireland until July 1975, when Roly Meates was appointed his successor.

Millar coached the hugely successful Lions tour to South Africa 1974. According to Ian McGeechan, he was pivotal to the success of the tour. Millar used information from ex-pats he knew in South Africa in his preparation.

Terry O’Connor (rugby writer) said: “In my view Millar has always been under-rated as a coach and overshadowed by Carwyn James who was in charge of the 1971 team. Both rank among the world’s best and brought different qualities to their work. James was a visionary about back play but accepted that his forward knowledge at Test level was limited. Millar has proved over the years a master of forward tactics and in 1974 forged the finest pack ever to visit South Africa.”

=== Manager ===
Millar managed the Lions tour to South Africa in 1980. He was the manager of the Irish national side at the 1987 World Cup.

=== Administrator ===
Millar became the president of the Ulster Branch of the Irish Rugby Football Union in 1985, and was appointed one of the representatives of the Irish Rugby Football Union (IRFU) to the IRB Council in 1992. He became president of the IRFU in 1995, and was also chairman of the British and Irish Lions from 1999 to 2002.

He was appointed IRB vice-chairman on 16 September 2002, replacing New Zealander Rob Fisher. He took on the role of interim chairman after the death of Vernon Pugh in 2003.

Millar was elected as the IRB chairman in late 2003 to a four-year term commencing in 2004. He presided over a governance restructure and new strategic plan for the IRB, and was influential in the continued lobbying for Rugby sevens inclusion in the Summer Olympics. He stepped down from his posts at the IRB and the IRFU following the 2007 World Cup and was succeeded as by Bernard Lapasset.

== Personal life and death ==
Millar was married and had a daughter Lesley and sons Peter and Johnny. He missed the birth of Peter, later an Ulster, Ireland and Barbarians prop, because he was on tour.

Syd Millar died on 10 December 2023, at the age of 89.

== Honours ==
On 20 May 2004 he was awarded the Freedom of the Borough of Ballymena.

Millar was awarded the Honorary Degree of Doctor of Science by the University of Ulster in 1992, and was inducted into the International Rugby Hall of Fame in 2003. He was made a CBE in 2005 having previously been appointed MBE.

On 12 December 2007, Millar was appointed to the Légion d'honneur, France's highest decoration, at a ceremony in Ballymena Rugby Club, by Bernard Lapasset, his successor as IRB Chairman.

In 2009 he was inducted into the International Rugby Hall of Fame. Gavin Mairs (rugby writer) said: ”Millar’s contribution to rugby football has been nothing short of phenomenal – from player, coach, manager and lately world-class administrator who presided over two outstanding Rugby World Cups and leaves the Game well equipped to continue its global expansion in the professional era.”

In 2016 he won the Vernon Pugh Award for Distinguished Service.

== Bibliography ==
- McKinney, Stewart (2012). Roars From the Back of the Bus. Mainstream Publishing. ISBN 978-1-84596-775-8.

Preceded by Ronnie Dawson	Irish national rugby coach 1972–1975	Succeeded by Roly Meates
