= Ronnie Dawson (rugby union) =

Irish rugby union player (1932–2024)

Alfred Ronald Dawson (5 June 1932 – 11 October 2024) was a rugby union player who played as a hooker for Ireland. He was captain of the British Lions on their 1959 tour to Australia, New Zealand and Canada.

== Youth and club rugby ==
Dawson was born in Dublin, Ireland. He was educated in St. Andrew's College in Dublin, Dublin Institute of Technology Bolton Street where he qualified as an architect and he worked as such for the Bank of Ireland for most of his professional career. He was Chief Architect and Head of their Premises Division when he retired.

Dawson joined Wanderers F.C. in August 1950 and played his club rugby on the 1st XV between 1950 and 1965, was Captain for the 1955–56 season and Coach/Selector from 1964 to 1968. He was a member of the administrative Executive Committee from 1962 until he retired in 1994. He was President of the club for the 1991–92 season.

Dawson played provincial rugby 28 times for Leinster between 1958 and 1964 (during which he captained the side), was president during the 1972–73 season and was an administrator on the Leinster Branch Executive Committee from May 1965 until he retired in 1986.

== Ireland ==
Dawson won the first of his 27 Irish caps in 1958, a match in which Ireland beat Australia and Ronnie scored a try – this being his only try and indeed points scored in an Irish jersey. Ronnie was Captain of the side on 11 occasions between 1958 and 1962 (including Captaining the 1961 Irish tour to South Africa) and retired from International rugby in 1964 (Ireland lost 6–27 to France in Colombes on 11 Apr 1964).

Dawson was a keen member of the Barbarians, playing 22 times on their Easter Tour and other matches between 1956 and 1965 (including the 1957 tour to South Africa). He was selected and played for the Barbarians against several incoming touring teams, including Australia (1958), South Africa (1961 – being Captain of the only team to beat the 1961 Springboks) and New Zealand (1964). He was also a member of the Barbarians Committee for a number of years.

Dawson was Captain of the British Lions on their 1959 tour to Australia, New Zealand and Canada – playing in six Tests as captain, he established a Lions record (which was later equalled by Martin Johnson). Notably, he was captain during the final test in Eden Park which the Lions won 6–9, and remains the only victory home nations players have enjoyed in Eden Park (save for the victorious 1973 English team). He was unavailable as a player for the 1962 Lions tour to South Africa.

== Administrator ==
Dawson was Assistant Manager/Coach in 1968 for the Lions tour to South Africa and was also a Lions selector.

Following his retirement from playing rugby union at the highest level, Dawson was instrumental in developing coaching of the game in Ireland, setting up coaching structures and was the first Irish coach – a role he undertook between 1969 and 1972 (including Coach to the 1970 Irish tour to Argentina). He was an International Selector from 1968 to 1972.

Dawson also moved into administration and was elected to the Irish Rugby Football Union (IRFU) Executive Committee in June 1970 and was President of the IRFU for the 1989–90 season (prior to his retirement from the IRFU Committee in 1994). He was a Trustee of the IRFU.

Dawson was an Irish representative on the (as it was then) Five Nations Committee and Committee of Home Unions from 1973 to 1994 – during this period he was elected to many roles, such as Chairman of Tours Committee, Chairman of Committee of Home Unions and Five Nations Committee. He was also an Irish representative on the International Rugby Board from 1974 to 1994 (being Chairman in 1983), was a member of the Rugby World Cup Organising Committee (for the first RWC tournament) in 1987 and the International Rugby Settlement (RWC Ltd.) between 1990 and 1994.

His lifetime contribution to the game of rugby union was acknowledged by the International Rugby Board firstly in 2004, when he was awarded the Vernon Pugh Award for Distinguished Service and again in 2013, when he was inducted into the IRB Hall of Fame.

His achievements were also recognised by the Dublin Institute of Technology (his alma mater), who conferred on him an Honorary Doctorate (Doctor of Philosophy) on 1 November 2014, in St. Patrick's Cathedral, Dublin.

== Death ==
Dawson died on 11 October 2024, at the age of 92.

| Preceded by None | Irish national rugby coach 1969–1972 | Succeeded by Syd Millar |
