= Rugby Victoria =

Member and founding union of Rugby Australia

- Sport: Rugby union
- Founded: 1888 (Melbourne R.U.) refounded VRU; 1893, 1909, 1926, renamed Rugby; Victoria in 2017
- RA affiliation: 1949 (founding member)
- Website: www.rugbyvic.com.au

Rugby Victoria, formerly the Victorian Rugby Union, is a member and founding union of Rugby Australia. Within the state of Victoria, it is the governing body for the sport of rugby union.

Rugby Victoria manages competitions for males and females in several age groups and divisions, and involving clubs from metropolitan Melbourne and regional Victoria.

Rugby union was founded in Melbourne in 1888. However competition lapsed and was twice re-established during the first twenty years, and again after the first World War when the present governing body was founded in 1926, then known as the Victorian Rugby Union, or VRU.

In December 2017, the VRU was re-branded as Rugby Victoria.

== History ==
=== Early years: 1888 to 1945 ===
The Melbourne Rugby Union was established in 1888 and the first two clubs were founded in that year. Later that season, a Victorian team was selected to play the British side known then as the "English Footballers" but now recognised as the First British Lions team.

The visitors won the match, 9-3. Melbourne's club competition ceased in 1890 but a new administrative body, the Victorian Rugby Union, was formed in 1893. The Victorians played their first inter-colonial rugby match in 1894, beating South Wales by 3-0 at the East Melbourne Cricket Ground.

Competition lapsed again after the Victorians were defeated 30-0 at the Melbourne Cricket Ground (MCG) by the British Lions in 1899, but the Victorian Rugby Union was re-formed in 1908. Australia played Victoria at the MCG in August of that year, on their way to Great Britain for what became known as the First Wallabies Tour.

Of the seven clubs comprising the new Union in 1909, Melbourne, East Melbourne, South Melbourne and University were the first to compete for the Dewar Shield, a trophy which is still awarded today to the premier first grade team. Competition ceased after the 1912 season and recommenced under a re-established VRU in 1926.

The subsequent decade later became known as the Golden Years of Victorian Rugby and included the selection of the first Victorian-born player to represent Australia, Sir Edward "Weary" Dunlop, in 1932. Dave Cowper, who played for the Melbourne Rugby Club and represented Victoria in the 1930s became Victoria's first, and so far only, Wallaby captain in 1933.

In 1939, four Victorian players were selected in the Wallaby side to tour Europe: Andy Barr, Max Carpenter, Stan Bisset and George Pearson. However the tour was prematurely ended by Britain's declaration of war on Germany just two days after the team arrived at Plymouth on 2 September 1939, with all sport in Britain cancelled.

=== Amateur rugby: 1945 to 1995 ===
Logo until late 2017

In 1958, the first test match in Victoria was staged at Olympic Park Stadium, with Australia hosting the Maoris.

=== Modern era: 1996 onward ===
The Victorian Rugby Union (VRU) bid unsuccessfully for the fourth Australian Super 14 licence, which eventually went to the Western Force prior to the 2006 season. However, New South Wales gave up a fourth franchise for the Australian Rugby Championship, allowing Victoria to field the Melbourne Rebels in that competition.

In November 2009, SANZAR announced that Australia had won the 15th Super rugby franchise licence, and the Australian Rugby Union awarded it to the Melbourne Rebels consortium led by media magnate Harold Mitchell. The VRU did not initially own or run the Melbourne Rebels.

On 27 June 2013, the Rebels announced that foundation shareholders Harold Mitchell AC, Bob Dalziel, Lyndsey Cattermole, Alan Winney, Ralph D'Silva, Gary Gray, Paul Kirk, Leon L'Huillier, David Ogilvy and Michael Bartlett had transferred 100% of their shares to the Victorian Rugby Union. The two organizations combined operations as a result of the transfer with Ross Oakley concluding his tenure as CEO of the VRU once the transfer was made. Rebels CEO Rob Clarke took responsibility for both organizations. Jonathan Ling became the chairman of the Melbourne Rebels, replacing Harold Mitchell. Peter Leahy was appointed General Manager of Community Rugby to oversee the operations of local competitions and all Victorian Community Rugby activities.

== Current competition ==
Victoria has twenty-six rugby clubs as of 2022. Senior player numbers have grown from 1,400 in 1998 to well over 2,200 in 2012. Teams in the competition have grown from 4 in 1909 to 173 in 2013.

The eight teams that compete for the Dewar Shield are:

- Power House RUFC (Albert Park)
- Melbourne University Rugby Football Club (Parkville)
- Harlequin Rugby Union Club (Ashwood)
- Melbourne Rugby Union Football Club (Prahran)
- Box Hill Rugby Union Football Club (Box Hill)
- Endeavour Hills Rugby Union Football Club (Endeavour Hills)
- Moorabbin Rugby Club (Moorabbin)
- Footscray Rugby Union Football Club (Footscray)
- Kiwi Hawthorn Rugby Union (Hawthorn)

As of 2018, Rugby Victoria has seven teams in their senior women's competition.

== Representative teams ==
Victoria Country Barbarians

The Victoria Country Barbarians team competed in the NRC Division 2 tournament from 2018 to 2019. From 2000 to 2008, the Melbourne Axemen played in the Australian Rugby Shield. In 2022 the team was renamed Victorian Axemen

=== Honours ===
- Australian Rugby Shield Winners (2007)

== See also ==
- Rugby union in Victoria
- Melbourne Rebels
- Melbourne Rising
- Dewar Shield
