= 1947–48 Australia rugby union tour of Britain, Ireland, France and North America =

- Coach: Arnold Tancred
- Tour captain: Bill McLean
Summary
P	W	D	L
Total
39	32	0	7
Test match
5	3	0	2
Opponent
P	W	D	L
Scotland
1	1	0	0
Ireland
1	1	0	0
Wales
1	0	0	1
England
1	1	0	0
France
1	0	0	1

Between July 1947 and March 1948, the Australia national rugby union team – the Wallabies – conducted a world tour encompassing Ceylon, Britain, Ireland, France and the United States on which they played five Tests and 36 minor tour matches. It was the first of such tour in twenty years, since that of the 1927–28 Waratahs, as the 1939–40 Australia rugby union tour of Britain and Ireland tour had been thwarted by World War II. They were known as the Third Wallabies.

The 1947–48 side was notable in preserving their try-line uncrossed by any of the Home Nations in the first four Tests played. The nine month journey was one of the last of that era of epic tours when transport was mostly by ship and when the tourists were welcomed by rugby fans and townships, civic officials and royalty.

The Australians in those days were still showcasing the new running style of rugby that had not yet been fully embraced in the northern hemisphere. The legacy of Johnnie Wallace's leadership of 1927–28, of Cyril Towers and the credo of galloping rugby as played at his Randwick club in Sydney had some bearing on this but Batchelor also suggests that the everyday competition for public attention between the two rugby codes caused the Australian game (both in Sydney and Brisbane) to need to match the speed and open play of the 13-a-side code. This need was not the same in London and Cardiff where rugby league as yet posed no threat to spectator numbers coming through rugby union turnstiles.

== The squad's leadership ==
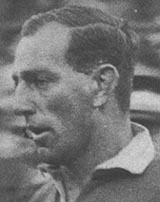
Bill McLean Unlucky Tour Captain

Nick Shehadie Wrote of the tour

A squad of 30 players were selected under tour captain Bill McLean. McLean was an experienced Wallaby and leader. His father and brother had represented as both Wallabies and Kangaroos, with his other brother Jack also a Wallaby tourist. Bill McLean had been selected in the 1939 side who'd travelled to England under captain Vay Wilson and were promptly turned about upon the declaration of war without playing a match. He had seen action in World War II against the Japanese as a Captain in an AIF Commando unit in Borneo. He had captained Australia's first post-war Wallaby sides on four occasions against the All Blacks and his return to the British Isles was in some ways a completion of unfinished business.

Trevor Allan was only 20 when selected as vice-captain of the squad. He had impressed in his first state and national representative starts a year earlier but in a squad of veteran campaigners including Graham Cooke and Phil Hardcastle his vice-captaincy was a surprise and an indication that he was being groomed for the future.

The tour was only six matches old when Bill McLean fulfilled his dream of playing at Twickenham in a minor clash against Combined Services. The match was near completion when McLean was hit by three tacklers from different angles. Howell, Tressider and Shehadie all write that the snap of bone breaking was audible to onlookers. McLean suffered a serious spiral fracture of the tibia and fibula and had played his last representative match. The tour captaincy passed at that moment to Allan, now just a few days past his 21st birthday. Allan was leading a squad comprising war veterans in Ken Kearney, Col Windon, Eddie Broad and Neville Emery; three qualified medical practitioners in Phil Hardcastle, Doug Keller and Clem Windsor; and a mixture of new and experienced Wallabies.

The tradition on earlier Australian tours had been that the manager took care of arrangements and the Asst-Manager fulfilled the coaching duties. Shehadie reports that Arnold Tancred and McLean coached and trained the 1947–48 side with vigour while Jeff Noseda took care of tour administration. Journalist Phil Tressider accompanied the touring party and wrote of Tancred "I remember Tancred as a grim, brooding man who not only managed the team but coached it and was sole selector. He would brook no interference and he kept the press at arm's length. He was fortified by his experiences as a player with the 1927–28 Waratahs and he had an aching ambition for victory", Shehadie wrote of Tancred. "[He] was a very strict disciplinarian who was determined that we would win as many matches as possible. He would constantly remind us that we would only be remembered for the number of matches we won" and goes on to quote Jack Pollard: "The only criticism of Tancred was that relied perhaps too heavily on the team's proven stars and did not give newcomers many opportunities. He barred sportswriters travelling with the team from staying in the same hotel, was uncooperative with the press, and the team did not enjoy very sympathetic media coverage".'

== Tour itinerary ==
The squad sailed southwards from Sydney Harbour in July 1947 aboard the passenger liner Orion. They departed Australia from Fremantle after crossing the Great Australian Bight, next docking in Colombo, Ceylon where they were welcomed and entertained by the expatriate community like the 1927–28 Waratahs before them. From there they sailed to Aden in Yemen, then Port Said, Egypt before arriving in England in the port town of Tilbury.

After seeing the sights of a London still scarred from wartime devastation, the party left by train for Penzance in Cornwall where their on-land training would pick up ahead of the first tour match against Combined Cornwall and Devon at Camborne won by the Wallabies. The minor matches would have an exacting toll with firstly McLean's injury in the sixth game and then the loss of champion Manly winger Charlie Eastes in the match against Newport to a broken arm which also spelled the end of his tour participation.

Rugged matches in Cardiff and Llanelly followed before the Wallabies returned to London where they visited the House of Commons and the House of Lords and met Clement Attlee at 10 Downing Street. Later at St James's Palace they were received by the Duke of Gloucester, a former Governor-General of Australia and met his young son Prince William. A tour highlight was a royal reception at Buckingham Palace where the squad met the King and Queen and the Princesses Elizabeth and Margaret. When the squad travelled to Ireland for the second Test they met the President Éamon de Valera.

Back in Britain after the France Test, the Wallabies met the British Barbarians in their inaugural match against an international team – such fixtures would thereafter become a regular event against touring national southern-hemisphere sides. The fixture was arranged during the tour as an extra match to raise funds for the Australians' journey home via Canada. The Barbarians fielded six internationals from England, five from Wales, two from Scotland, one from Ireland. A Barbarian tradition is to select one uncapped player and on this occasion it was Blackheath F.C. winger Martin Turner. The Barbarians won 9–6 and at the after match function tour captain McLean was given honorary Barbarian membership.

After the Barbarians match the team sailed for New York aboard the Queen Mary. From there they travelled across the Rockies by train, playing a number of fixtures against sides comprising expatriates and American footballers. The final tour match was against a University of California team in Los Angeles. The homeward legs were taken by air – Australian National Airlines flew a Skymaster from Los Angeles to Hawaii (an overnight stop), to Canton Island, to Fiji (another overnight) before arriving in Sydney on 28 March 1948. Two years later that very same plane – the Amana – would crash on a scheduled flight from Melbourne to Perth killing all 29 on board.

== Test matches ==
22 November 1947

Australia	16–7	Scotland
Arthur Tonkin (3 – 1t); Max Howell (3 – 1t); Ken Kearney (3 – 1t); Graeme Cooke (3 – 1t); Brian Piper (4 – 2g)		(4 – 1dg) Derek Hepburn (3 – 1g) Charles McDonald

Murrayfield Stadium, Edinburgh
Attendance: 50,000

AUSTRALIA: Brian Piper, Arthur Tonkin, Trevor Allan, Max Howell, Terry MacBride, Neville Emery, Cyril Burke, Eric Davis, Ken Kearney, Eric Tweedale, Joe Kraefft, Graham Cooke, Doug Keller, Arthur Buchan, Colin Windon

SCOTLAND: Ian Lumsden, Graeme Jackson, Donny Innes, Thomas Wright, Charlie McDonald, Peter Hepburn, Dallas Allardice, Robert Bruce, Dod Lyall, Ian Henderson, Leslie Currie, Hamish Dawson, Douglas Elliot, Gordon Watt, Jimmy Lees

6 December 1947

Australia	16–3	Ireland
Arthur Tonkin (3 – 1t); Trevor Allan (5 – 1t, 1g); Cyril Burke (3 – 1t); Colin Windon (3 – 1t); Bob McMaster (2 – 1g)		(3 – 1g) Kevin Quinn

Lansdowne Road, Dublin
Attendance: 50,000

AUSTRALIA: Brian Piper, Arthur Tonkin, Max Howell, Trevor Allan, Terry MacBride, Neville Emery, Cyril Burke, Bob McMaster, Ken Kearney, Eric Tweedale, Joe Kraefft, Graham Cooke, Doug Keller, Arthur Buchan, Colin Windon

IRELAND: Dudley Higgins, Des McKee, Kevin Quinn, Paddy Reid, Kevin O'Flanagan, Jack Kyle, Ernest Strathdee, Jimmy Corcoran, Karl Mullen, Albert McConnell, Richard Wilkinson, Jimmy Nelson, Bill McKay, Ernie Keeffe, Desmond McCourt

20 December 1947

Wales	6–0	Australia
Bill Tamplin (6 – 2g)

Cardiff Arms Park, Cardiff
Attendance: 45,000

AUSTRALIA: Brian Piper, Arthur Tonkin, Trevor Allan, Max Howell, Terry MacBride, Neville Emery, Cyril Burke, Bob McMaster, Ken Kearney, Eric Davis, Joe Kraefft, Graham Cooke, Doug Keller, Arthur Buchan, Colin Windon

WALES: Billy Cleaver, Ken Jones, Bleddyn Williams, Jack Matthews, Leslie Williams, Glyn Davies, Handel Greville, Emlyn Davies, Mal James, Cliff Davies, John Gwilliam, Bill Tamplin, Ossie Williams, Les Manfield, Gwyn Evans

Australia were beaten squarely in a dull, forwards based game with neither side penetrating to score a try.

3 January 1948

Australia	11–0	England
Colin Windon (6 – 2t); Alan Walker (3 – 1t ) Arthur Tonkin (2 – 1g)

Twickenham Stadium, London
Attendance: 70,000
Referee: H Lamber (Ireland)

The Wallabies enjoyed a feast of possession in the first half with their locks Cooke and Kraefft dominating the line-outs and their forwards ahead in the scrums three to one. The match was played at a furious pace and at the twenty-minute mark suddenly for the first time in four Tests the Australian goal line was threatened when the English centre Bennett put Swarbrick into open space.

Swarbrick licked up the pass like a sprinter head down for the finish. Sheer pace carried him on. Tonkin could not get to him. He swerved out, his flying feet not brushing the chalk from the touch line. Piper's dash to the corner was too late. Swarbrick pounced forward – he was clear ! The 70,000 crowd were on their toes. Wild arms waved to high heaven. The Twickenham Valley, pinched between the canyon grandstands, reverberated with thundering clanging to a crescendo. He was not only clear – he was through ! He was indeed over the line, safely, marvellously home. He had but to fall on his face and England would be a try up. A dead man must have scored us three points. And then, as Swarbrick hurled himself down, a pin-pointed rocket caught him, swept him through mid-air, ball and all, into the no-man's land of touch in goal. It was Trevor Allan, the forlorn hope, saving his side after all was lost. '

The sides were evenly matched thereafter with both sets of backs depriving the other of a scoring opportunity. Then right before half-time a kick by Syd Newman failed to find touch and landed in the Australian pack for Ken Kearney to bring the ball forward. It went through many hands before Colin Windon scored in the corner to give the Wallabies a 3–0 lead at the break.

With the game three-quarters over England's full-back Newman hit the post with a penalty attempt that would have kept them in the match. Then with ten minutes to go, the game opened up in Australia's favour. Alan Walker chip-kicked ahead, regathered in spectacular fashion and scored. Then Col Windon's punishing defence on English pivot Tommy Kemp saw Kemp spill the ball and Windon set off like "the Breeze" he was affectionately known as, and outpaced all to the try-line.

AUSTRALIA: Brian Piper, Arthur Tonkin, Trevor Allan (c), Alan Walker, Terry MacBride, Neville Emery, Cyril Burke, Nicholas Shehadie, Ken Kearney, Eric Tweedale, Joe Kraefft, Graham Cooke, Doug Keller, Arthur Buchan, Colin Windon

ENGLAND: Syd Newman, Dickie Guest, Billy Bennett, Edward Scott, David Swarbrick, Tommy Kemp (c), Richard Madge, Eric Evans, John Keeling, Harry Walker, Joe Mycock, Samuel Victor Perry, Micky Steele-Bodger, Brian Vaughan, Jika Travers

11 January 1948

France	13–6	Australia
Michel Pomathios (3 – 1t); Guy Basquet (6 – 2t); Andre Alvarez (4 – 2g)		(6 – 2g) Arthur Tonkin

Stade Colombes, Paris
Attendance: 30,000

AUSTRALIA: Brian Piper, Arthur Tonkin, Trevor Allan, Alan Walker, Terry MacBride, Neville Emery, Cyril Burke, Nicholas Shehadie, Ken Kearney, Eric Tweedale, Joe Kraefft, Graham Cooke, Doug Keller, Arthur Buchan, Colin Windon

FRANCE: Andre Alvarez, Michel Pomathios, Pierre Dizabo, Maurice Terreau, Roger Lacaussade, Leon Bordenave, Gerard Dufau, Lucien Caron, Lucien Martin, Eugene Buzy, Alban Moga, Robert Soro, Jean Prat, Guy Basquet, Jean Matheu-Cambas

== Touring party ==
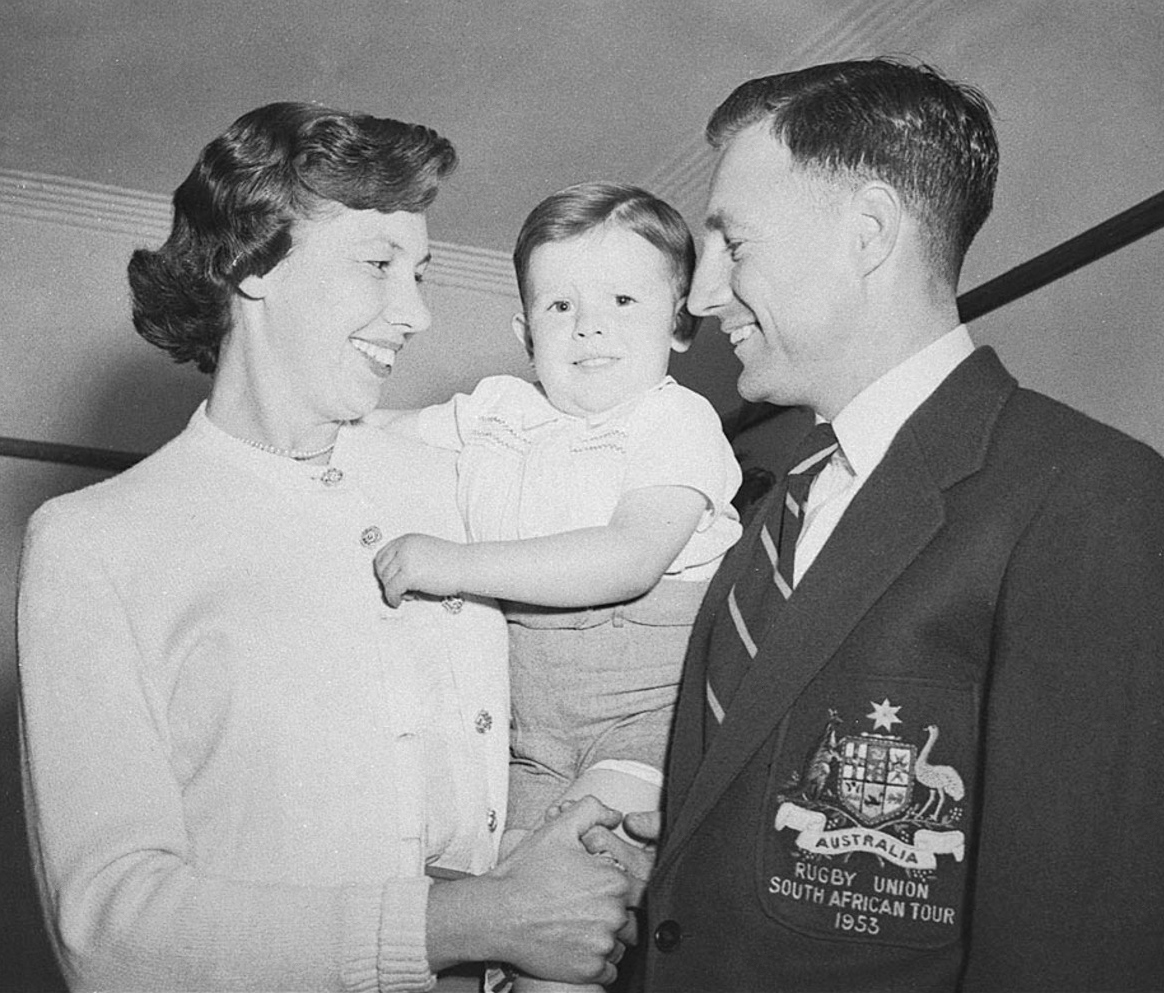
Cyril Burke & family.

- Manager: Arnold Tancred
- Tour secretary: Jeff Noseda
- Captain: Bill McLean
- Vice-captain: Trevor Allan

=== Squad ===
Name	Tests	Club	Career caps	Tour Apps	Position	Pts
Brian Piper	5	Randwick	12		Full back	
Arthur Tonkin	5	Gordon	6		Three-quarter	
Trevor Allan	5	Gordon	14		Three-quarter	
Max Howell	3	Randwick	5		Three-quarter	
Alan Walker	2	Manly	5		Three-quarter	
Terry MacBride	5	Eastern Suburbs	10		Three-quarter	
Charlie Eastes	0	Manly	6		Three-quarter	
Neville Emery	5	Sydney University	10		Five-eight	
Cyril Burke	5	Newcastle	26		Half-back	
Roy Cawsey	0	Randwick	2		Half-back	
Keith Winning	0	GPS Brisbane	1	8	Flanker	
Doug Keller	5	Drummoyne Rugby Club	13 6 Aus 7 Scot		Forward	
Phil Hardcastle	0	Sydney University			Forward	
Clem Windsor	0	University of Queensland	1		Full back	
Eddie Broad	0	GPS Brisbane	1		Five-eight	
Colin Windon	5	Randwick	20		Forward	
Eric Davis	2	Footscray, Victoria	4		Forward	
Ken Kearney	5	Parramatta	7		Forward	
Eric Tweedale	4	Parramatta	10		Forward	
Joe Kraefft	5	Sydney University	6		Forward	
Graham Cooke	5	YMCA Brisbane	13		Forward	
Arthur Buchan	5	Randwick	10		Forward	
Bob McMaster	1	Brisbane Brothers	7		Forward	
Nicholas Shehadie	2	Randwick	30	24	Forward	
Bill McLean	0	GPS Brisbane	5		Forward	
Jim Stenmark	0	Sydney Uni		22	Forward	
Wal Dawson	0	Manly	2		Forward	
Kevin Bourke	0	Brisbane Brothers	1		Three-quarter	
John Fuller	0	Sydney University	9	11	Forward	
Mick Cremin	3	Randwick	19		Fly-Half	

== Matches of the tour ==
The "Exhibition Matches" are not classed as important as the "Tour matches", they are listed on the tour although the starting line-ups are not counted in the players' stats.

N°	Opposing Team	F	A	Date	Venue	Status
1	(England) Devon and Cornwall	17	7	13 September 1947	Recreation Ground, Camborne	Tour match
2	(England) Midland Counties	22	14	17 September 1947	Villa Park, Birmingham	Tour match
3	(England) Gloucestershire & Somerset	30	8	20 September 1947	Kingsholm Stadium, Gloucester	Tour match
4	(Wales) Abertillery and Cross Keys	6	3	24 September 1947	Abertillery	Tour match
5	(Wales) Cardiff	3	11	27 September 1947	Cardiff Arms Park	Tour match
6	(England) Combined Services	19	8	1 October 1947	Twickenham, London	Tour match
7	(England) Northumberland and Durham	49	0	5 October 1947	Gosforth Greyhound Stadium, Gosforth	Tour match
8	North of Scotland	14	0	8 October 1947	Linksfield Stadium, Aberdeen	Tour match
9	South of Scotland	15	6	11 October 1947	The Greenyards, Melrose	Tour match
10	(Scotland) Glasgow & Edinburgh	23	9	15 October 1947	Glasgow	Tour match
11	(England) Cumberland and Yorkshire	25	0	18 October 1947	Workington	Tour match
12	(Wales) Newport	8	4	23 October 1947	Rodney Parade, Newport	Tour match
13	(Wales) Aberavon and Neath	19	9	25 October 1947	The Gnoll, Neath	Tour match
14	(Wales) Llanelli	6	4	28 October 1947	Stradey Park, Llanelli	Tour match
15	(England) London Counties	20	8	1 November 1947	Twickenham, London	Tour match
16	(England) Cambridge University	12	9	6 November 1947	Grange Road, Cambridge	Tour match
17	(England) Hampshire and Sussex	14	5	8 November 1947	The Dell, Southampton	Tour match
18	(England) Oxford University RFC	5	3	13 November 1947	University of Oxford, Oxford	Tour match
19	(England) Leicestershire & East Midlands	17	11	15 November 1947	Welford Road, Leicester	Tour match
20	Scotland	16	7	22 November 1947	Murrayfield, Edinburgh	Test match
21	(England) Lancashire & Cheshire	8	9	26 November 1947	Belle Vue Stadium, Manchester	Tour match
22	Ulster	14	10	29 November 1947	Ravenhill Stadium, Belfast	Tour match
23	Ireland	16	3	6 December 1947	Lansdowne Road, Dublin	Test match
24	Munster	6	5	9 December 1947	Mardyke, Cork	Tour match
25	(Wales) Swansea RFC	11	8	13 December 1947	St Helen's Ground Swansea	Tour match
26	Wales	0	6	20 December 1947	Cardiff Arms, Cardiff	Test match
27	(Wales) Pontypool, Talywain & Blaenavon	9	7	23 December 1947	Pontypool Park, Pontypool	Tour match
28	(England) London Counties	8	14	26 December 1947	Twickenham, London	Tour match
29	England	11	0	3 January 1948	Twickenham, London	Test match
30	France	6	13	11 January 1948	Stade Colombes, Paris	Test match
31	South West France	8	7	15 January 1948	Bordeaux	Tour match
32	(France) Toulon	16	5	21 January 1948	Toulon	Tour match
33	Île-de-France	30	12	24 January 1948	Paris	Tour match
34	Barbarians	6	9	31 January 1948	Cardiff Arms Park, Cardiff	Tour match
35	(Canada) Vancouver All Stars	36	3	28 February 1948	Vancouver	Exhibition Match
36	(Canada) University of British Columbia	20	6	3 March 1948	Vancouver	Exhibition Match
37	(Canada) Victoria	48	8	6 March 1948	Vancouver	Exhibition Match
38	(United States) University of California	12	6	17 March 1948	Los Angeles	Exhibition Match
39	(United States) Stanford University	59	10	21 March 1948	Palo Alto, San Francisco	Exhibition Match
