= 1947–48 Scottish Districts season =

Rugby union competition

- Countries: Scotland
- Date: 1947–48
- Matches played: 9

The 1947–48 Scottish Districts season is a record of all the rugby union matches for Scotland's district teams.

== History ==
Glasgow District beat Edinburgh District in the Inter-City match.

The West of Scotland v East of Scotland match scheduled for 29 November 1947 was called off.

In the Scotland Probables v Scotland Possibles match, the Possibles (Rest) beefed up their forward pack when W. A. Todd (Bath) replaced W. P. McLaren (Aberdeen GSFP) in the second half.

Representative matches next season will be : — Sept. 27—North v . Midlands, at Perth. Oct. 8—North of Scotland v . Australia, at Aberdeen. Oct. 11—South of Scotland v . Australia, at Melrose. Oct. 15—Glasgow and Edinburgh v . Australia, at Glasgow, Nov. 8—Edinburgh District Union v . South District Union, at Edinburgh. Nov. 15—Glasgow and District Union v . Rest of West Clubsat Glasgow. Nov. 22—Scotland v . Australia, at Murrayfield. Nov. 29—East v . West, in the West. Dec. 6—Inter-City, at Glasgow. Dec. 20—Trialat Murrayfield. Jan. 24—Scotland v . France, at Murrayfield. Feb. 7—Wales v . Scotland in Wales. Feb. 28—Ireland v . Scotland, at Dublin. March 20—Scotland v . England, at Murrayfield. Usually played in November, the North v . Midlands match has been advanced to September and will be a trial for the early visit of the Australians. The South v . North match does not appear on the card this season owing to the heavy representative fixture list.

South play Co-Optimists on 1 October 1947.

== Results ==
Date	Try	Conversion	Penalty	Dropped goal	Goal from mark	Notes
1905–1947	3 points	2 points	3 points	4 points	3 points	

=== Inter-City ===
6 December 1947

Glasgow District	11 - 8	Edinburgh District
Try: Allan Cameron; Drop: Angus Cameron x 2	Report; Report	Try: David MacKenzie; Ranald Macdonald; Con: Koren

Old Anniesland, Glasgow
Referee: A. Bowie (Hawick)

Glasgow District: W.C.W. Murdoch (Hillhead HSFP), G. D. Kay (Glasgow University), Billy Munro (Glasgow HSFP), Allan Cameron (Hillhead HSFP), C. W. R. Andrew (Glasgow Academicals), Angus Cameron (Glasgow HSFP), K. C. Gordon (Hillhead HSFP), J. R. McClure (Ayr), S. R. F. Miller (Kelvinside-West), Hamish Dawson (Glasgow Academicals), Bill Black (Glasgow HSFP), Bob Gemmill (Glasgow HSFP), D. Gibson (Glasgow University), P. A. Paterson (Hillhead HSFP), H. S. Holden (Glasgow University)
Edinburgh District: C. J. R. Mair (Edinburgh University), David MacKenzie (Edinburgh University), Ranald Macdonald (Edinburgh University), T. C. Brown (Watsonians) [captain], G. T. Ewan (Watsonians), B. M. McKenzie (Edinburgh University), Angus Black (Edinburgh University), Ian Henderson (Edinburgh Academicals), R. G. Pringle (Heriots), I. G. Deas (Heriots), Robert Finlay (Watsonians), J. Wiltshire (Edinburgh University), D. M. Fisher (Watsonians), R. Koren (Stewart's College FP), Douglas Elliot (Edinburgh Academicals)

=== Other Scottish matches ===
27 September 1947
2.45pm

North of Scotland District	13 - 3	Midlands District
Try: Donny Innes; R. F. Buthley; R. M. Bruce; Con: Allardyce x 2	Report	Pen: Kennedy

North Inch, Perth

North of Scotland District: T. A. Findlay (Gordonians): F. R. Patterson (Aberdeen GSFP), R. F. Buthlay (Aberdeen GSFP), Donny Innes (Aberdeen GSFP) [captain], D. W. C. Smith (Aberdeen GSFP), D. R. Macgregor (Aberdeen GSFP), Dallas Allardice (Aberdeen GSFP), J. S. G. Munro (Aberdeen GSFP), G. D. Duncan (Gordonians), F. Clark (Aberdeen University), R. M. Bruce (Gordonians), W. R. Ingram (Gordonians) A. R. Burnett (Aberdeen University), L. Middleton (Aberdeen GSFP), J. H. Warrack (Aberdeen GSFP).
Midlands District: R. Kennedy (Dunfermline); P. W. Grant (St Andrews University). N. Niven (Madras F.P.). A. A. S. Scott (Perth Accies) A. S. Munro (Perth Accies.): J. A. S. Taylor (Perth Accies.). D. Bain (Perth Accies.); L. Currie (Dunfermline). I. Graham (Panmure). I. Black (Perth Accies.). A. S. Thomson (Perth Accies.). H. Scott (St Andrews Un.). W. Martin (Dunfermline). L. Graham (Morgan), T. P. Cooper (St Andrews Un.).

15 November 1947

Glasgow District	15 - 12	Rest of the West

Glasgow District:
Rest of the West:

=== Junior matches ===
8 November 1947

Edinburgh District	9 - 8	South of Scotland District

Murrayfield Stadium
Referee: J. M. S. Risk (Glasgow Academicals)

Edinburgh District: W. Dalziel (Northern), W. Murchie (R.D.V.C), A. Kerr (R.D.V.C), M. G. Scott (Trinity Acads.). and W. Clouston (Broughton F.P.); W. W. Ewen (Broughton F.P.) and J. A. Meikle (Trinity Acads.): F. Martin (Holy Cross Acads.). C. Mallinson (Trinity Acads.); D. Smith (Broughton F.P.), W. Marshall (Edinburgh City Police), M. Scougall (Kenmore). J. H. Orr (Edinburgh City Police), [captain], J. Bisland (Preston Lodge F.P.). and I. Moonie (Musselburgh)
South of Scotland District: N. Michie (Gala Star); W. Ormiston (Gala Star). A. Turnbull (Gala Y. M.), P. Sheriff (Hawick Trades). and F. Waldie (Walkerburn), J. Lumsden (Hawick Trades) [captain], and J. Mitchell (Gala Y.M.), J. Knox (Walkerburn), A. Waldie (Hawick Y.M), C. Burgess (Gala Star), J. Hegarty (Hawlck Y.M.), A. Storey (Hawick Linden), W. Daniels (Gala Star), A. Robson (Hayrick Linden) and G. Hock (Hawick Trades)

29 November 1947

West of Scotland District	cancelled	East of Scotland District

West of Scotland District:
East of Scotland District:

=== Trial matches ===
20 December 1947

Scotland Probables	0 - 8	Scotland Possibles
	Report	Try: Pringle; Todd; Con: Andrew

Murrayfield Stadium
Referee: M. A. Allan (SRU)

Probables: Ian Lumsden (Watsonians and Bath), T. G. H. Jackson (London Scottish), Donny Innes (Aberdeen GSFP), E. Ogilvy (London Scottish), David MacKenzie (Edinburgh University), K. D. Buchanan (London Scottish), W. D. Allardyce (Aberdeen GSFP), R. M. Bruce (Gordonians), G. Lyall (Gala), Ian Henderson (Edinburgh Academicals), L. Currie (Dunfermline), Hamish Dawson(Glasgow Academicals), Douglas Elliot (Edinburgh Academicals), A. J. M. Watt (Army), J. B. Lees (Gala)
Possibles: D. McIntyre (Glasgow HSFP), R. W. G. Jarvie (Glasgow HSFP), L. Gloag (London Scottish), Allan Cameron (Hillhead HSFP), C. W. R. Andrew (Glasgow Academicals), Angus Cameron (Glasgow HSFP), Angus Black (Edinburgh University), W. D. F. Stobie (Oxtord University), R. W. Pringle (Heriots), S. Coltman (Hawick), Bob Gemmill (Glasgow HSFP), H. H. Campbell (London Scottish), D. Gibson (Glasgow University), W. P. Black (Glasgow HSFP), Bill McLaren (Aberdeenshire) [replaced by W. A. Todd (Bath) in the second half]

=== English matches ===
No other District matches played.

=== International matches ===
8 October 1947

North of Scotland District	0 - 14	Australia
	Report	Try: Walker; MacBride; Kraefit; Windon; Con: Stenmark

Linksfield Stadium, Aberdeen
Attendance: 8,000
Referee: R. A. Beattie (Watsonians)

North of Scotland District: T. A. Findlay (Gordonians); A. S. Munro (Perthshire Academicals). R. F. Buthlay (Aberdeen G.S.F.P.). J. R. Kennedy (Dunfermline), D. W. C. Smith (Aberdeen G.S.F.P.), D. R. MacGregor (Aberdeen G.S.F.P.), W. D. Allardyce (Aberdeen G.S.F.P.), F. Clark (Aberdeen University), I. N. Graham (Panmure). L. Currie (Dunfermline), R. M. Bruce (Gordonians). H. Scott (St. Andrews University), W. H. Martin (Dunfermline). A. S. Thomson (Perthshire Academicals), T. B. Cooper (St Andrews University).
Australia: Clem Windsor, Arthur Tonkin, T. K. Bourke, Alan Walker, J. W. T. MacBride; Eddie Broad, Cyril Burke, D. H. Keller, Ken Kearney, Eric Davis, Phil Hardcastle, D. F. Kraefft, Colin Windon, J. O. Stenmark, J. G. Fuller.

11 October 1947

South of Scotland District	6 - 15	Australia
Pen: McDonald x 2	Report	Try: Tonkin; Con: Allan; Pen: Allan; Drop: Howell

The Greenyards, Melrose
Attendance: 12,000
Referee: M. A. Allan (SRU)

South of Scotland District: J. Sanderson (Gala), A. Charters (Kelso), C. McDonald (Jed-Forest), C. W. Drummond (Melrose), G . Wilson (Kelso), J. Chalmers (Hawick), J. Wright (Hawick), S. Coltman (Hawick), G. G. Lyall (Gala), D. Welsh (Kelso), W. Herbert (Gala), A. Crawford (Melrose), D. Valentine (Hawick), J. B. Lees (Gala) [captain], R. Anderson (Selkirk)
Australia: B. J. Piper, C. C. Eastes, Trevor Allan [captain], Max Howell, Arthur Tonkin, Mick Cremin, Cyril Burke, Eric Davis, Ken Kearney, D. H. Keller, G. M. Cooke, J. O. Stenmirk, D. F. Kraefft, Phil Hardcastle, Colin Windon

15 October 1947

Cities District	9 - 23	Australia
Pen: Andrew x 3	Report	Try: Allan; Keller; Kearney; Burke; Eastes; Con: Piper x 2 Drop: Emery

Old Anniesland, Glasgow
Referee: Adam Austin

Cities District: T . Nell (Kelvinside-West), R. W. G. Jarvie (Glasgow HSFP), C. W. R. Andrew (Glasgow Academicals), Ranald Macdonald (Edinburgh University), G. T. Ewan (Watsonians), I. C. P. Thomson (Melville College FP) [captain], Angus Black (Edinburgh University), Hamish Dawson (Glasgow Academicals), R. W. Pringle (Heriots), T. P. L. McGlashan (Royal HSFP), S. W. Hill (Kelvinside-West), D. W. Deas (Heriots), Douglas Elliot (Edinburgh Academicals), D. I. McLean (Royal HSFP), R. C. Taylor (Kelvinside-West)
Australia: B. J. Piper, C. C. Eastes, Trevor Allan [captain], Max Howell, J. W. T. MacBride, N. A. Emery, Cyril Burke, E Tweedale
Ken Kearney, Bob McMaster, D. H. Keller, D. F. Kraefft, G. M. Cooke, Colin Windon, A. T. Buchan, J. O. Stenmark
