= Fabian McCarthy (rugby union) =

- Fabian McCarthy
- Born: Fabian Joseph Charles McCarthy; 24 June 1919 Roma, Queensland
- Died: 5 December 2008 (aged 89) Toowoomba, Queensland
- Height: 6 ft 0 in (1.83 m)
- Weight: 14 st 2 lb (89.81 kg)
- Occupation: Farmer

Rugby union career
- Position: Forward
Amateur team(s)
Years	Team	Apps	(Points)
- GPS Rugby
–	Toowoomba		
Provincial / State sides
Years	Team	Apps	(Points)
1948–1950	Queensland	22	((6))
International career
Years	Team	Apps	(Points)
1949–1950	Australia	5	

Fabian Joseph Charles McCarthy (24 June 1919 – 5 December 2008) was an Australian rugby union footballer who played for GPS and Toowoomba, represented Queensland at a state level, and the Wallabies at an international level.

== Rugby Union career ==
McCarthy played his first club rugby match in 1947 at the age of 27. After just one season he was selected for the state team and the following year he represented the national team. Former Queensland manager, Tom Blue, described McCarthy, along with Paul Costello as the "finds of the tour" following his first tour of New South Wales with the Queensland team in 1948.

McCarthy was regarded as a hard rucking, tireless forward who displayed plenty of strength and vigour during his games against New South Wales. He earned his place on the Australian rugby union team and toured New Zealand in 1949. McCarthy was amongst an impressive Australian pack including, Col Windon, Keith Cross, Dave Brockhoff, Sir Nick Shehadie, Rex Mossop, Bevan Wilson, Nev Cottrell, and Jack Baxter. Captained by Trevor Allan, the Australian team of 1949 defeated the All Blacks in both tests and lost only one of its twelve games.

McCarthy continued to display excellent form throughout the 1950 season. Max Hawkins wrote that McCarthy played "the game of his career" against the Western District. Hawkins continued his praise of McCarthy by writing that "he proved in Sydney that he is the finest tight forward playing in Australia today". Former Queensland manager-coach, Joe French, described McCarthy's game against the Western Districts as "one of the greatest forward efforts he had ever seen".

McCarthy was selected to play in the first test against the British Isles in 1950. Captain Trevor Allan was forced to pull out of the Australian team two days before playing the first test match due to a thigh muscle injury. He was replaced by Nev Cotrell who led the team into what proved to be a bitter blow for the Australians. The Wallabies lost the first test by 19 points to 6. Welsh fullback, Lewis Jones, scored an impressive 16 of the team's 19 points. McCarthy retired from rugby union in 1950 but continued to play rugby league locally until 1956.

== Games played for Australia ==
- 24 August 1949 – Australia vs. Poverty Bay – East Coast at Gisborne, New Zealand Aust. 20 Pov.-Eas. 12
- 27 August 1949 – Australia vs. Wairarapa Bush Rugby Football Union at Masterton, New Zealand Aust. 21 Wa.Bu 14
- 7 September 1949 – Australia vs. Combined (Nelson, Golden Bay, Marlborough) at Blenheim, New Zealand Aust. 14 Comb. 8
- 14 September 1949 – Australia vs. Combined (North Otago, South Canterbury, Ashburton) at Oamaru, New Zealand Aust. 12 Comb. 0
- 19 August 1950 – 1st Test Australia vs. British Isles at Brisbane, Australia Aust. 6 Brt. Isl. 19
