= Colin Windon =

Australian rugby union player and soldier

- Born: Colin James Windon; 8 November 1921 Randwick, New South Wales
- Died: 3 November 2003 (aged 81)
- School: Sydney Grammar School
- Notable relative(s): Stan (father), Maude (mother); Keith Windon (brother)

Rugby union career
- Position: Flanker
Senior career
Years	Team	Apps	(Points)
	Randwick	98	
Provincial / State sides
Years	Team	Apps	(Points)
1946–53	New South Wales	26	
International career
Years	Team	Apps	(Points)
1946–53	Australia	20	(33)
Coaching career
- Years: Team
- 1954–57: Randwick

Colin "Col" Windon, (8 November 1921 – 3 December 2003) was a rugby union player and soldier who captained Australia – the Wallabies – in two Test matches in 1951. By age 18 Windon was playing at flanker for his club Randwick in Sydney's Shute Shield. After serving with the Second Australian Imperial Force in the Pacific Theatre during the Second World War, Windon resumed his rugby career in 1946. He was first selected for Australia for their tour of New Zealand that year. Despite the Wallabies losing both their Tests on tour, Windon impressed with his play.

In 1947 Windon was selected for Australia's tour of Europe and North America where he played 27 of his side's 36 matches. He played all five Tests on tour, against Scotland, Ireland, Wales, England and France. In the match against England, which Australia won 11–0 after a dominant display from Windon that included two tries. He was appointed vice-captain for the Wallabies 1949 tour of New Zealand, where Australia won both Test matches to win the Bledisloe Cup in New Zealand for the first time.

He captained his country in two matches against the touring New Zealanders in 1951. Windon's career ended after an injury interrupted tour to South Africa in 1953. His eleven Test tries was the most by an Australian until the 1980s, and he was named in Australian rugby's team of the century in 1999. In 2005 he was honoured as one of the inaugural five inductees into the Australian Rugby Union Hall of Fame, and in 2013 was named as an inaugural inductee in Inside Rugby's Invincibles.

== Early life and sporting family ==
Windon attended Randwick Public School before Sydney Grammar where he was a mediocre rugby player, and never progressed beyond the lower grades. He showed promise as a young cricketer and from Grammar was selected in a Combined Schoolboys representative cricket side.

Colin's father Stan was a foundation member of the Coogee Surf Life Saving Club and played rugby with the Randwick club in Sydney. Both Colin and his brother Keith inherited their father's love of rugby; Keith played as a flanker for Australia between 1936 and 1946, with his career interrupted by the Second World War. According to author Max Howell, Keith was a "football genius", and was a star during the 1937 South African tour of Australia. It was after watching his brother play for Australia in 1937 that Colin decided he too wanted to play for Australia; at the time Colin was struggling in school rugby, and his father said to him "Son, I don't think you will ever play for Australia". Keith was on the ill-fated 1939 Wallaby tour to England; the team docked at Plymouth, but the next day war was declared and they returned to Australia without playing a game. Keith did manage to briefly resume his career after the war, touring to New Zealand with the 1946 Wallabies, but he was diagnosed with gout while on tour and was forced to retire.

== Club rugby and playing style ==
Col Windon joined Randwick in 1938 at the age of 17, and started playing in the fourth grade. He had progressed to first grade when aged 18, and went on to play 98 first grade matches with the club. Windon played at flanker or "breakaway", and earned the knick-name "Breeze" because, according to former Wallaby Max Howell "he ran like the wind".

In an obituary of Windon, he was described as "not only a rugged, hard-tackling breakaway, he was a speedy, elusive runner with a gift for scoring tries". According to Max Howell Windon claimed his best coach was his brother Keith. In order to analyse opponents, he would look up from the scrum before the ball was fed.

== War service ==
Enlisting in the Second Australian Imperial Force on 18 December 1941 after basic training in Dubbo, Windon was posted to the 2/3 Infantry Battalion, 6th Division, He saw service in the Owen Stanley Ranges in Papua New Guinea where he contracted malaria, and after convalescence in the Atherton Tablelands he returned to New Guinea. He recovered to see action Aitape-Wewak campaign in 1945. Windon was a runner, and would weave and "zig-zag" to avoid enemy fire. He was discharged from the Army on 13 August 1946.

== Representative rugby career ==
Col Windon made his debut for Australia on their 1946 tour of New Zealand. His brother Keith was in the side (the only player in the squad that had toured New Zealand previously) which was captained by Bill McLean. Col Windon played nine of Australia's twelve matches on tour, and played both test matches against New Zealand. The first test was played in Dunedin, where New Zealand won 31–8. Despite the loss, the New Zealand Rugby Almanack described Windon as "the outstanding forward on either side". The second test was a much tighter affair; played at Auckland, New Zealand scored only one try to win 14–10, but according to rugby writer Winston McCarthy, it was "only [New Zealand fullback] Bob Scott's boot that prevented them [Australia] from winning".

The following year New Zealand reciprocated and toured Australia. Windon played twice for the New South Wales Waratahs against the touring All Blacks, and in one of the two test matches. The tour was treated as a trial for Australia's 1947–48 tour of Europe and North America that commenced later that year. Windon played 27 matches on the 36-match tour, and in all five test matches: against Scotland, Ireland, Wales, England and France. The Wallabies did not concede a try in any of their four Home Nations matches. (Note: Australia lost to Wales 6–0, but defeated the other three Home Nations' sides.)

Windon scored eight tries to be the fourth highest try scorer on tour behind three-quarters John MacBride, Charlie Eastes and Trevor Allan. (Note: MacBride, Eastes and Allan each scored ten tries.) He debuted as Australian captain in tour matches against Aberdeen and Leicester. In the Test against England at Twickenham he dominated the match – journalist Phil Tressider said: "I saw him [Windon] single-handedly destroy England". Windon scored two tries in the first half, with the second coming after England fly-half Tommy Kemp spilled the ball which Windon collected before running 45 metres (148 ft) to score. The try was converted to give Australia an unassailable lead., and they went on to win 11–0.

In 1949 a New Zealand Māori side toured Australia where they played three Test matches. (Note: The Australian Rugby Union awarded caps for the three matches against the New Zealand Māori, but the New Zealand Rugby Football Union have never awarded Test caps for New Zealand Māori matches.) The tour was organised by the New Zealand Rugby Football Union (NZRFU) after Māori players were excluded from the All Blacks' 1949 tour to apartheid South Africa. Windon appeared in all three Tests, as well as playing for New South Wales against the tourists. He scored a try in all three Tests; the first was won by the Maori, the second a draw, and the third won by Australia. (Note: The Māori loss in the third Test was their only loss on their 11-match tour.)

Later that year Windon he was selected as vice-captain to Trevor Allan for a tour of New Zealand. The 12-match tour included two Tests against the All Blacks. The series against New Zealand, for the Bledisloe Cup, was considered a consolation for the Maori players after the "guilt" of the NZRFU for not selecting them for the All Black tour of South Africa that was occurring at the same time. Windon played in ten tour matches, scored eight tries, and captained his side against Manawatu-Horowhenua. The Wallabies defeated the All Blacks in the two-Test series, winning the first 6–11 and the second 9–16. Windon scored in both matches, and despite the weakened opposition made history as part of the first Australian team to win the Bledisole Cup on New Zealand soil. (Note: Only seven of the 22 All Blacks who played in the series against Australia ever played for their country again.)

Windon's next Test was against the All Blacks when they reciprocated with a tour of Australia in 1951. Keith Winning captained the Wallabies in the first Test of the series, but broke his jaw in an Australian XV match. He was replaced as captain by Windon for the second and third Tests – Windon's only Tests as captain. All three Tests were lost, and New Zealand went undefeated on tour. It was during this series that Windon got engaged, and celebrated by inviting the entire New Zealand side to his house.

In 1952 he was selected for the domestic series against Fiji and later that year again toured New Zealand with the Wallabies. He played in nine of Australia's ten tour matches in New Zealand. The Wallabies lost only two of their matches, a game against Southland, and their second Test against the All Blacks. In the first Test Windon harassed the New Zealand fly-half with his aggressive defence, and pounced on a loose ball to score a try after the ball was dropped following a mistimed All Blacks' back-line move. The New Zealanders adjusted to Australia's tactics to win the second Test 15–8, but Windon did get the consolation of another try.

Windon's last tour was to South Africa in 1953, but he never fully recovered from an injury suffered prior to the tour, and only made six appearances. He announced his retirement immediately following the tour. Early in his retirement he coached his club Randwick from 1954 to 1957.

== Records and accolades ==
Following a tour of New Zealand, in 1946 he was selected by the New Zealand Rugby Almanac as one of its five players of the year. The magazine Sporting Life picked him in its All Australian team in five years 1947, 1948, 1949, 1951 and 1952. After being named in Australian rugby's team of the century in 1999, he was given a plaque on the Sydney Cricket Ground's Walk of Honour. In 2005 he was honoured as one of the inaugural five inductees into the Australian Rugby Union Hall of Fame, and in 2013 was named as an inaugural inductee in Inside Rugby's Invincibles.

For over thirty years Windon was Australia's leading Test try-scorer with 11, until his record was overtaken by winger Brendan Moon in the 1980s. Upon his induction Australian Rugby Union President Paul McLean referred to Windon as "an electrifying talent and a try scoring machine". His 1947 Wallaby tour teammate Sir Nicholas Shehadie described him as follows: "As back-row forwards go, he was the very best. A try-scoring machine, a superb attacker and with the speed of a three-quarter, the man they nicknamed 'Breeze' was simply peerless in supporting play".

== Personal life ==
Windon married Judy Macdonald in 1954, and the couple had three daughters Julie, Fiona and Kate. He lived nearly all his life near Randwick, and was eventually elected to the city council's Sporting Hall of Fame. He supported the sporting pursuits of his children and later his grandchildren. He died of cancer in 2003 just short of his 82nd birthday.

== See also ==
- Australia rugby union captains

== Footnotes ==
=== References ===
Preceded by Keith Winning	Australian national rugby union captain 1951	Succeeded by John Solomon
