= 1948 Oxford-Cambridge rugby union tour of Argentina =

Summary
P	W	D	L
Total
9	9	0	0
Test match
2	2	0	0
Opponent
P	W	D	L
Argentina
2	2	0	0

The 1948 Oxford-Cambridge rugby union tour of Argentina was a series of matches played in Argentina by a mixed selection of players from Oxford and Cambridge universities in 1948. The matches were held in Buenos Aires and Rosario.

After some contacting the previous years, the Argentine Rugby Union then, "River Plate Rugby Union" hosted, with the help of clubs Gimnasia y Esgrima de Buenos Aires and Hindú, this selection, formed also of many international players of British national team.

It was the first (of a total of four) tours of this British team on Argentina.

== The team ==
- C. R. Hopwood (manager)
- A. Matthews (referee)
- Syd Newman
- S. M. Duff
- David Swarbrick
- D. J. W. Bridge
- J. B. Raine
- Alan Stewart
- M. T. Maloney
- Clive van Ryneveld
- J. H. Galbraith
- Arthur Dorward
- P. J. de A. Moore
- T. S. Mc Roberts
- E. C. C. Wynter
- R. V. Thompson
- C. G. Gilthorpe
- G. A. Wilson (Capt.)
- Peter Kininmonth
- A. P. de Nobriga
- Eric Bole
- Anthony van Ryneveld
- R. D. Gill
- John Kendall-Carpenter
- Barry Holmes

== Results ==
4 August 1948

El Resto	3–22	Oxford & Cambridge

Gimnasia y Esgrima, (Note: Referred as "Maldonado", as this venue was formerly known.) Buenos Aires
Referee: Austin Mathews (England)

8 August 1948

Capital (Note: Combined formed of players from Buenos Aires city ("Capital Federal").)	5–16	Oxford & Cambridge

Gimnasia y Esgrima, Buenos Aires
Referee: Austin Mathews (England)

12 August 1948

Los Norteños	0–19	Oxford & Cambridge

Gimnasia y Esgrima, Buenos Aires
Referee: Austin Mathews (England)

15 August 1948

Provincia (Note: Combined formed of players from Greater Buenos Aires, popularly known as "provincia de Buenos Aires".)	3–17	Oxford & Cambridge

Gimnasia y Esgrima, Buenos Aires
Referee: Austin Mathews (England)

17 August 1948

Litoral	0–51	Oxford & Cambridge

Plaza Jewell, Rosario
Referee: Austin Mathews (England)

22 August 1948

Club Universitario B.A.	0 - 10	Oxford & Cambridge

Gimnasia y Esgrima, Buenos Aires
Referee: T. H. Blades (Argentina)

25 August 1948

Porteños	0–15	Oxford & Cambridge

Gimnasia y Esgrima, Buenos Aires
Referee: Austin Mathews (England)

29 August 1948

Argentina	0–17	Oxford & Cambridge
	Report

Gimnasia y Esgrima, Buenos Aires
Referee: Austin Mathews (England)

5 September 1948

Argentina	0–39	Oxford & Cambridge
	Report

Gimnasia y Esgrima, Buenos Aires
Referee: T. H. Blades (Argentina)
