= John Solomon (rugby union) =

Australian rugby union player (1929–2020)

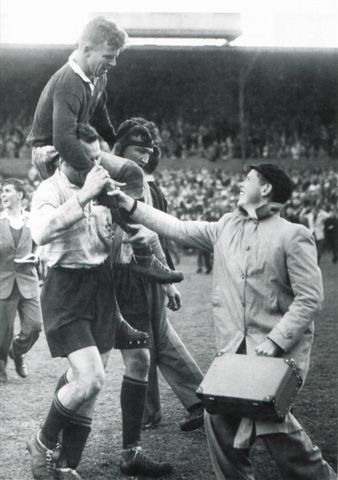
- Born: Herbert John Solomon; 15 October 1929 Randwick, New South Wales, Australia
- Died: 18 March 2020 (aged 90)
- School: The Scots College
- University: University of Sydney
- Occupation: Obstetrician /Gynaecologist

Rugby union career
- Position(s): Wing, fullback, centre, fly-half
- Current team: retired
Senior career
Years	Team	Apps	(Points)
1948–1955	Sydney University		
Provincial / State sides
Years	Team	Apps	(Points)
1949–1955	New South Wales	19	
International career
Years	Team	Apps	(Points)
1949–1955	Australia	14 Tests	
Coaching career
- Years: Team
- Sydney University
- –: Australia

Herbert John Solomon (15 October 1929 – 18 March 2020) was an Australian rugby union player, a state and national representative versatile back who captained the Wallabies in eight Tests in the 1950s and led the touring squads to New Zealand and South Africa.

== Early life and university ==
Educated at Coogee Prep School and then The Scots College in Sydney, Solomon started his club rugby at the University rugby club when he commenced his medical studies at St Andrew's College at Sydney University in 1948. He won University "blues" in 1948, 1949, 1950 and 1951.

== Australian representative ==
He made his state and national representative debuts at age nineteen, first playing for Australia against the New Zealand Maori at the Sydney Cricket Ground in June 1949. Later that year he toured New Zealand with Trevor Allan's Bledisloe Cup winning Wallabies. Solomon played variously at five-eighth, fullback and centre in seven matches of the tour including the 2nd Test at Eden Park where he scored a try thus helping the side make history as the first Australian team to win the Cup in New Zealand.

He played twice for New South Wales in 1950 against the visiting British and Irish Lions and as five-eighth for Australia in both Tests of the tour. He was in the centres in the second Waratahs match against the Lions who up till that point of their tour were undefeated. Solomon held his own against the world-class opposition of Bleddyn Williams and Lewis Jones.

In 1951 Solomon played against the visiting All Blacks in two Tests and with the Waratahs. The selectors experimented with Keith Winning and Colin Windon as captain and then in 1952 when Australia hosted the exciting Fijians, Solomon was made at twenty-two years old. His first game as captain was Fiji's first game against Australia. Fiji had previously competed at the world-class level against New Zealand in 1939. Solomon played at inside-centre and clinched the first Test for Australia when he dived over for a try six minutes from the end. The Fijians won the 2nd Test but had earned the respect of the Australian rugby public due to their carefree way of playing.

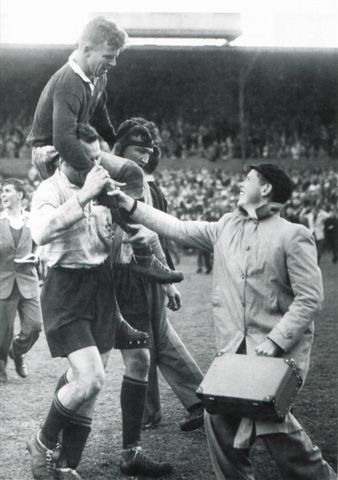
Wallaby captain Solomon chaired by the Springboks 1953

Australia then undertook a ten matches tour of New Zealand for which Solomon was chosen as captain with tour manager the 1927 Waratah, Jock Blackwood. Solomon's Wallabies won eight of the ten games including one Test victory and one Test loss. Solomon scored three tries in the nine matches in which he played, captaining his country in all.

In 1953 Solomon was again appointed captain for the arduous Wallaby tour of South Africa. Wylie Breckenbridge and Johnnie Wallace were the management team but Wallace took ill and many organisational and coaching responsibilities fell to Solomon. He himself was ill for the first three games but recovered to play in 14 of the 27 tour matches including three Tests. In the 2nd Test Australia were trailing 14–8 when Solomon had to leave the field with a knee injury. He recovered to feature in a back-line play that saw Brian Johnson score in the corner and Eddie Stapleton boot the conversion from out wide to take the score to 14–13. From the kick-off another enterprising running back-line play saw Solomon play a role which culminated in winger Garth Jones scoring under the posts to enable a Wallaby victory. In a surprise gesture fitting the rarity in those days of the South Africa being beaten at home, the Boks forwards chaired Solomon from the field.

Following the South African tour, Solomon took a year out to attend to his medical studies but returned in 1955 to captain the Wallabies to New Zealand with Wylie Breckenbridge as manager and Bill Cerutti as assistant manager/coach. Solomon only played in six of the thirteen games suffering a dislocated shoulder against a Canterbury/Otago side which marked the end of his representative career. He later coached at the university club as well as the Australian national side.

== Accolades and honours ==
His 1953 South African tour teammate Sir Nicholas Shehadie described him as follows: "Quick enough to play centre or wing, equipped with a skilful swerve and sharp acceleration when a gap appeared. Much admired for his astute captaincy".

He was inducted into the Australian Rugby Hall of Fame in 2016.

== Sources ==
- Collection (1995) Gordon Bray presents The Spirit of Rugby, HarperCollins Publishers Sydney – (Essay specific to this article Syd King's A Change From Batter & Heave 1st published Sporting Life Aug 1952)
- Howell, Max (2005) Born to Lead – Wallaby Test Captains, Celebrity Books, Auckland NZ
- Shehadie, Nicholas (2003) A Life Worth Living, Simon & Schuster Australia

Preceded by Colin Windon	Australian national rugby union captain 1952–55	Succeeded by Nick Shehadie
