= Roy Cawsey =

Australian rugby player

- Full name: Roy Milton Cawsey
- Born: 14 September 1922 Sydney, NSW, Australia
- Died: 15 May 1974 (aged 51) Denman, NSW, Australia

Rugby union career
- Position: Scrum-half
International career
Years	Team	Apps	(Points)
1949	Australia	3	(4)

Roy Milton Cawsey (14 September 1922 — 15 May 1974) was an Australian rugby union international.

Cawsey, educated at Sydney Boys High School, served as a Sergeant with the 9th Field Regiment during World War II.

A scrum-half, Cawsey played his rugby for Randwick and was capped three times for the Wallabies. He was a member of the Wallabies squad for the 1947–48 tour of Britain, Ireland and France but rarely appeared during the trip and Cyril Burke was preferred as scrum-half for all five Tests. An injury to Burke handed Cawsey his first cap in 1949, against NZ Maori in Sydney. He was then named for that year's tour of New Zealand and played both Tests as a makeshift fullback, a position he had never played, with Brian Piper missing the series after falling from a hotel balcony. The Wallabies won both matches to win their first Bledisloe Cup on New Zealand soil. He announced his retirement the following year.

Cawsey was also a first-grade cricketer in Sydney Grade Cricket.

== See also ==
- List of Australia national rugby union players
