= Nev Cottrell =

- Born: Neville Vincent Cottrell; 16 March 1927 Brisbane
- Died: 20 June 2014 (aged 87)
- School: St Laurence's College Brisbane

Rugby union career
- Position: Hooker
Amateur team(s)
Years	Team	Apps	(Points)
- YMCA Brisbane
–	Souths Rugby		
Provincial / State sides
Years	Team	Apps	(Points)
1947 - 55	QLD		
International career
Years	Team	Apps	(Points)
1949 - 1952	Australia	14	(0)

Neville Cottrell (1927–2014) was an Australian rugby union footballer. A Queensland and national representative forward, he played fourteen Test matches for Australia, including two as captain.

== Early life ==
Cottrell was born in Brisbane, Queensland, and attended St Laurence's College. He initially played for the Brisbane West End rugby side in "B" grade competitions before being invited to join the Brisbane YMCA team in the Queensland Premier competition. Coached by former Wallaby hooker Edward Bonis, Cottrell was quickly mentored and made a rapid rise to the representative level.

== Representative rugby career ==
Cottrell made his state representative debut for Queensland in 1947 against a touring All Blacks side. Although, he was deemed too young to make the 1947–48 tour to the British Isles, by 1949 he had established himself as Australia's number one hooker. That year, he played again for Queensland against the New Zealand Māori and made his national representative debut with three Test appearances against the Māori visitors.

In 1949, he toured with Trevor Allan's Wallabies to New Zealand, where they won the Bledisloe Cup for the first time in New Zealand and achieved eleven wins from twelve games on tour. Cottrell played in both Tests and seven matches. When Allan was injured in 1950, Cottrell was picked to captain the Wallabies in a home Test series against the visiting British Lions, though both matches were lost.

Cottrell went on to make seven more Test appearances: three in a 1951 home series against the All Blacks under the captaincy of Keith Winning, and four in 1952 against Fiji (two matches) and New Zealand (two matches) under John Solomon.

== Accolades ==
Cottrell was the first hooker to captain Australia, and upon Cottrell's retirement, only Eddie Bonis, who played in the 1930s, had made more Test appearances at hooker.

Howell quotes the Australian sports journalist Jack Pollard who wrote :

Before each game, he excluded everything but the approaching challenges from his mind. He talked of nothing else, pacing his hotel room hitting his hands together, grunting in a most aggressive manner. He maintained it at meals and kept muttering to himself and when the whistle went he played like a runaway train. It was frightening to even sleep with him during this pre-match period but after the game he relaxed and joined in socialising with gusto.

— Jack Pollard, Australian Rugby (1994)

.

Preceded by Trevor Allan	Australian national rugby union captain 1950	Succeeded by Keith Winning

== Published references ==
- Howell, Max (2005) Born to Lead - Wallaby Test Captains, Celebrity Books, Auckland NZ
