= Eric Tweedale =

Australian rugby union player (1921–2023)

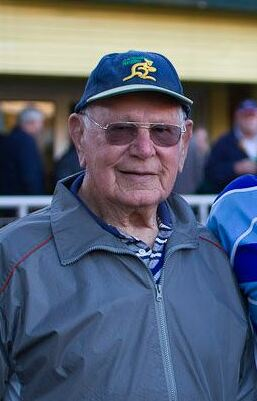
- Tweedale in 2011
- Born: 5 May 1921 Rochdale, Lancashire, England
- Died: 16 October 2023 (aged 102)

Rugby union career
- Position: Prop
Amateur team(s)
Years	Team	Apps	(Points)
1936–1942, 1957	Parramatta Two Blues		
Provincial / State sides
Years	Team	Apps	(Points)
- New South Wales
-	New South Wales Country		
International career
Years	Team	Apps	(Points)
1946–1949	Australia	10	
Coaching career
- Years: Team
- 1957: Parramatta Two Blues

Eric Tweedale (5 May 1921 – 16 October 2023) was an English-born Australian international rugby union player. He played club rugby for Parramatta Two Blues, provincial rugby for New South Wales and internationally for the Australia national rugby union team as a prop. Between 5 May 2021 and his death, he was the oldest living Australian rugby international.

== Early life ==
Eric Tweedale was born in Rochdale, England. His family emigrated with him to Australia in 1924 and settled in Merrylands, a suburb of Sydney, New South Wales. He was educated at Metropolitan Business College. When he was 15, he joined Parramatta Two Blues after a suggestion from Bill Cerutti. He started as a lock but then became a prop. During the Second World War, Tweedale joined the Royal Australian Navy and played in Navy representative matches. After returning to Australia, he made his Australian provincial rugby debut for New South Wales in 1946.

== International career ==
In 1946, Tweedale was selected for the Wallabies for the 1946 Australia rugby union tour of New Zealand. He was also a part of the 1947–48 Australia rugby union tour of Britain, Ireland, France and North America. He played his last match for the Wallabies against the New Zealand Māori in 1949 after earning ten international caps. He moved to Parkes working for Shell but still played for New South Wales Country against the British Lions. In 1957, he moved back to Sydney to play for Parramatta Two Blues as a player/coach and saved them from relegation from Division 1 of the Shute Shield but retired from playing that year.

== Later life ==
After retiring, Tweedale acted as the president of Parramatta. He was married twice, firstly to Isobel, who died in 1964 and with whom he fathered a daughter, and secondly to Phyllis, who died in 2006. In the late 2000s, Eric reunited with Enid Bradshaw, a lady to whom he had been betrothed in 1942, but the engagement was called off following his time in the Navy. He would become the patron for Parramatta Two Blues (later renamed Western Sydney Two Blues). In 2000, he was awarded the Australian Sports Medal. For his 100th birthday, Cumberland City Council agreed to rename Western Sydney Two Blues' Granville Park stadium as the "Eric Tweedale Stadium".

Tweedale died on 16 October 2023, with his death announced by Rugby Australia.
