= Graham Cooke (rugby union) =

Australia international rugby union player (1912-1996)

- Full name: Graham Morven Cooke
- Born: 2 January 1912 Nanango, QLD, Australia
- Died: 24 May 1996 (aged 84)
- Height: 6 ft 2.5 in (1.892 m)

Rugby union career
- Position: Lock
International career
Years	Team	Apps	(Points)
1932–48	Australia	14	(3)

Graham Morven Cooke (2 January 1912 — 24 May 1996) was an Australian rugby union international.

Cooke was born in Nanango, Queensland, and raised on the family farm. He left school at the age of 14 to support his family after the death of his father and worked a variety of jobs in his teenage years.

A product of Toowoomba rugby, Cooke was a tough second row forward and gained 14 Wallabies caps during his career, debuting against the All Blacks in Sydney in 1932. He featured on the 1933 tour of South Africa, where he remained for three and a half years, working for East Rand Proprietary Mines. While in South Africa, Cooke played provincial rugby for Transvaal. He returned to Australia in 1937 and after the war was recalled by the Wallabies for the 1946 tour of New Zealand, at the age of 34. The following year, Cooke was selected for the 1947–48 tour of Britain, and France, where he played all five Tests and became the first Wallaby to have featured against all major rugby nations.

== See also ==
- List of Australia national rugby union players
