= Cyril Burke =

Australia international rugby union player

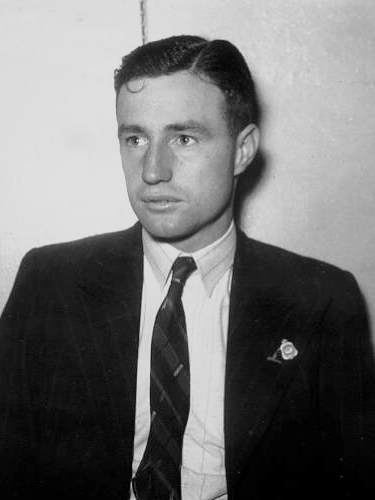
- Burke in 1950
- Born: Cyril Thomas Burke; 7 November 1925 Waratah, New South Wales, Australia
- Died: 18 January 2010 (aged 84) Mount Hutton, New South Wales, Australia

Rugby union career
- Position: Scrum-half
Amateur team(s)
Years	Team	Apps	(Points)
- Newcastle Waratahs
Provincial / State sides
Years	Team	Apps	(Points)
	New South Wales	36	
- Correct as of 31 December 2007
International career
Years	Team	Apps	(Points)
1946–56	Australia	26	(6)
- Correct as of 31 December 2007

Cyril Thomas Burke BEM (7 November 1925 – 18 January 2010) was an Australian rugby union player, a state and national representative scrum-half who made twenty-six Test appearances for the Wallabies between 1946 and 1956.

== Playing career ==
Born in Waratah near Newcastle, New South Wales he had a long association with the Newcastle Waratahs club as both a player and coach. He made thirty-six state representative appearances for New South Wales (also called the "Waratahs").

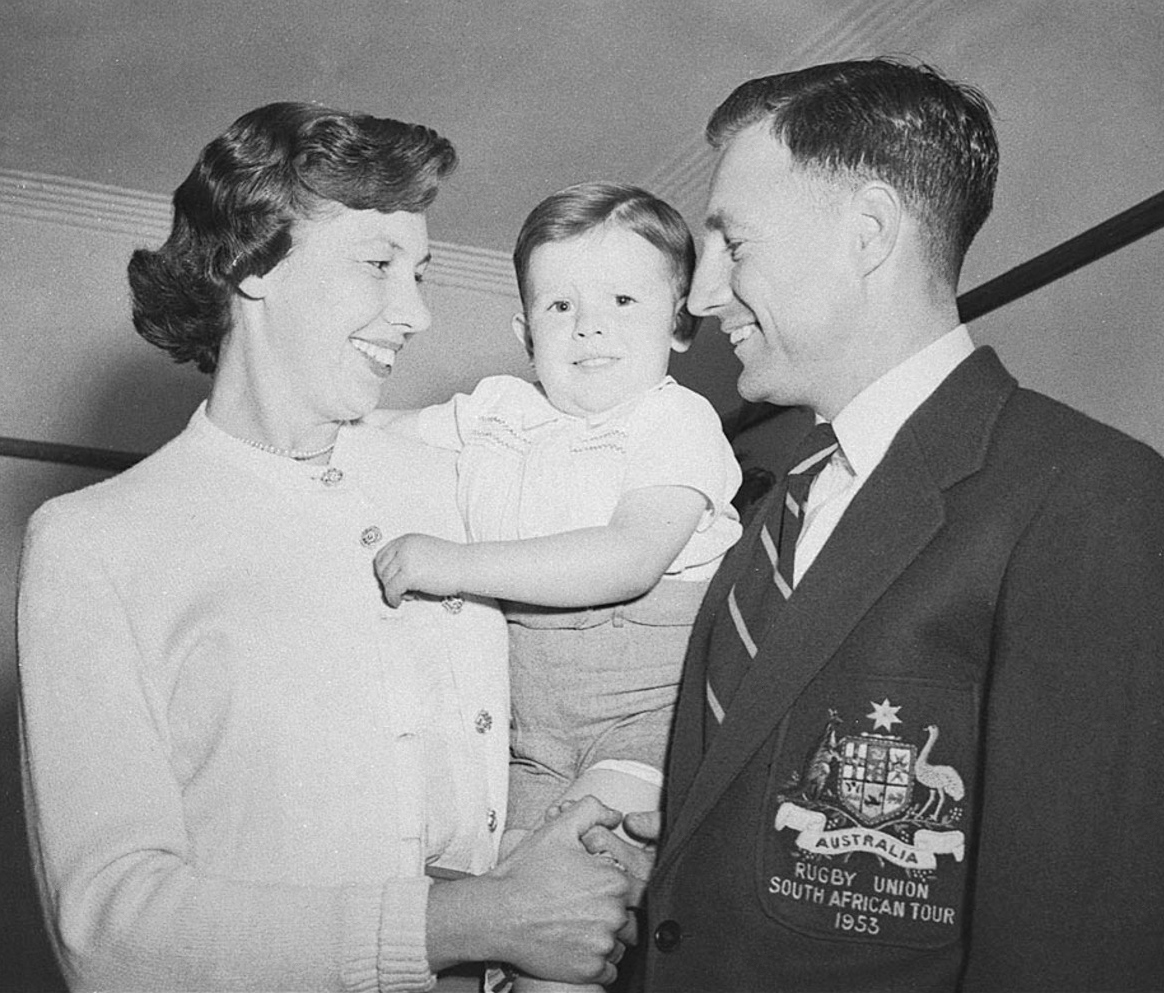
Burke home from the 1953 Wallaby tour of South Africa.

His Australian representative debut was made against the All Blacks at Eden Park in 1946 and the following year he played in two domestic Tests against New Zealand when they toured Australia. He was selected in the 1947–48 Australia rugby union tour of the British Isles, Ireland, France and North America where he played in all five Tests. He made seven overseas rugby tours including New Zealand in 1949 and South Africa in 1953 and met those same nations as well as the British and Irish Lions in several Test series played in Australia.

== Accolades ==
Tressider quotes from a 1988 interview with 1947 Wallaby captain Trevor Allan reflecting on the tour: "I have fond memories of the tour, none better than Cyril Burke, the little Newcastle halfback who, with Col Windon, had most impact on our games. The opposition simply never knew when he was going to put the foot down on the accelerator or pull off that fantastic sidestep"'. His 1947 tour teammate Sir Nicholas Shehadie described him as follows: "Size was no handicap for this masterhalf-back, certainly the best I ever played with in my career. He had the biggest sidestep I ever saw from any player, delivered quick-fire service from the scrums and rucks and had a keen eye for a possible gap".

== Honours ==
On 15 June 1974, Burke was awarded the British Empire Medal (BEM) in recognition of service to sport. He was awarded the Australian Sports Medal on 29 September 2000. The Cyril Burke Medal was named in his honour, and is presented annually to the top player in the New South Wales First Division.

He was inducted into the Australian Rugby Union's Hall of Fame in 2015.
