= Arthur Buchan =

Rugby player (1924–2020)

- Full name: Arthur John Buchan
- Born: 28 September 1924 Bankstown, Sydney, Australia
- Died: 20 June 2020 (aged 95)

Rugby union career
- Position: No. 8
International career
Years	Team	Apps	(Points)
1946–49	Australia	10	(0)

Arthur John Buchan (28 September 1924 — 20 June 2020) was an Australian rugby union international. Educated at Sydney Technical High School, Buchan was a speedy number eight who kept fit as a surf lifesaver with the Cronulla SLSC. He played first-grade rugby for Sydney University, Randwick and St. George.

Buchan was capped 10 times for the Wallabies, debuting on the 1946 tour of New Zealand, where he featured in both Test matches and captained the team in a tour match against Canterbury. He played all five Tests on the 1947–48 tour of Britain, Ireland and France, before appearing with the Wallabies for the final time in 1949.

== See also ==
- List of Australia national rugby union players
