= Keith Winning =

Australian rugby union player (1928–2003)

Arch Winning
- Born: Keith Charles Winning; 2 February 1928 Maleny, Queensland, Australia
- Died: 6 June 2003 (aged 75)
- School: Brisbane Grammar School

Rugby union career
- Position: Flanker
Amateur team(s)
Years	Team	Apps	(Points)
- University
- GPS
- Randwick
Provincial / State sides
Years	Team	Apps	(Points)
1945–53	Queensland		
International career
Years	Team	Apps	(Points)
1947–51	Australia	1	(0)

Official website
- Winning at Stats Guru

Keith Charles "Arch" Winning (2 February 1928 – 6 June 2003) was an Australian national representative rugby union player for Australia. He captained the national side in the sole Test match appearance he made.

== Biography ==
Born in Maleny, Queensland Winning's early rugby was played at Brisbane Grammar and at the University of Queensland. He burst onto the representative scene in 1947 at aged 19 playing for Queensland. Howell asserts that Winning was a surprise selection in the squad for the 1947–48 Australia rugby union tour of Britain, Ireland, France and North America that year. Squad captain Bill McLean and Colin Windon were the senior flankers in the squad with Jim Stenmark and John Fuller also picked. Winning beat out Roger Cornforth for a tour berth but a debilitating groin injury restricted him greatly and he played in only eight matches of the tour, none of them Tests.

In 1951 Winning was selected to captain Australia in a Test match against the All Blacks in Sydney. He backed up a week later in an Australian XV in a match in which his jaw was badly broken. That match marked the end of his national representative career although he appeared again for Queensland through to 1953.

Winning died at a Wallaby reunion lunch in 2003.

Preceded by Nev Cottrell	Australian national rugby union captain 1951	Succeeded by Colin Windon
