= Walter Dawson =

Walter Dawson may refer to:

- Walt Dawson (born 1982), American Alzheimer's disease activist
- Walter Dawson (RAF officer) (1902–1994), British air chief marshal
- Wal Dawson, Australian rugby union player
