= Arthur Tonkin =

Arthur Tonkin may refer to:

- Arthur Tonkin (politician) (1930–2022), Western Australian politician
- Arthur Tonkin (rugby union) (1922–1991), Australian rugby union player
