= Wal Dawson =

- Full name: Walter Laird Dawson
- Born: 17 July 1924 Manly, Sydney, Australia
- Died: 2 February 1996 (aged 71)
- University: University of Sydney

Rugby union career
- Position: Hooker
International career
Years	Team	Apps	(Points)
1946	Australia	2	(0)

Walter Laird Dawson (17 July 1924 — 2 February 1996) was an Australian rugby union international.

Raised in Manly, Dawson received his education at Manly Boys Intermediate High School. A hooker, he was a product of North Steyne juniors, before playing his early first-grade for Manly RUFC. He won a premiership with Manly in 1943 and the next year switched to Sydney University, where he studied engineering, but returned to Manly after graduating.

Dawson was on the 1946 tour of New Zealand with the Wallabies, playing both Test matches against the All Blacks, at Carisbrook and Eden Park. He also made the 1947–48 tour of Britain, Ireland and France, but played in only uncapped matches, with Ken Kearney preferred as hooker for the Tests.

== See also ==
- List of Australia national rugby union players
