= Arthur Tonkin (rugby union) =

- Born: Arthur Edward Joseph Tonkin; 19 October 1922 Wagga Wagga, New South Wales
- Died: 19 April 1992 (aged 69)
- School: St. Joseph's College, Hunters Hill
- Occupation: Teacher

Rugby union career
- Position: Wing
Senior career
Years	Team	Apps	(Points)
1946–	Gordon RFC		
Provincial / State sides
Years	Team	Apps	(Points)
1947–	New South Wales	6	
International career
Years	Team	Apps	(Points)
1947–50	Wallabies	6	(14)

Arthur Edward Joseph Tonkin (19 October 1922 – 19 April 1992) was an Australia national representative rugby union footballer who featured in the 1947–48 Wallaby tour of the British Isles.

== Early life ==
Tonkin's father was one of the pioneers of the New South Wales Country Rugby League but made no attempt to influence his three children on which sports they should play. Tonkin went to Wagga Wagga Christian Brothers' and later to St. Joseph's College, Hunters Hill where he benefited under Brother Henry, the College's legendary coach of the 1930s. He won the GPS Schools sprint championship in 1942 and was an army sprint champion during his wartime service. He was a gunner in the AIF who saw three years of active service during World War II.

== Club rugby ==
Tonkin joined the Gordon Club after his discharge and played the first of six matches for New South Wales in 1947. A powerfully built sprinter he added menace to every team in which he played because of his rare acceleration and scoring potential.

== Representative rugby career ==
He missed a place in the Test against New Zealand in 1947 but was selected for that year's epic Wallaby tour and became one of the spearheads of Australia's attack in Britain after champion Manly winger Charlie Eastes broke his leg in an early tour match. Tonkin appeared on the wing in all five Tests of the tour using his blinding acceleration to get around his opposing wingers to score tries against Scotland and Ireland. He was also one of four kickers who figured in the Tests (along with Brain Piper, Trevor Allan and Bob McMaster) kicking two penalties against France in the Paris Test at Stade Colombes. Injury affected his representative prospects after the conclusion of the tour but he made a further Test appearance against the British Lions in Sydney in 1950.

== Post playing ==
Tonkin became a lecturer in physical education after his football career ended and worked at Armidale Teachers' College where he also coached rugby. He retired in 1982, leaving the coaching of college rugby teams to John Hipwell.
