= Bill Tamplin =

Wales international rugby union footballer

- Born: William Ewart Tamplin; 10 May 1917 Risca, Caerphilly County Borough, Wales
- Died: 20 October 1989 (aged 72) Pontypool, Wales

Rugby union career
- Position: Lock
Amateur team(s)
Years	Team	Apps	(Points)
- Abergavenny RFC
?-1939	Pontypool RFC		
1939–1940	Newport RFC		
1946–1947	Cardiff RFC		
1947–48	Barbarian F.C.		
International career
Years	Team	Apps	(Points)
1947–1948	Wales	7	(24)

William Ewart Tamplin (10 May 1917 – 20 October 1989) was a Welsh international rugby union lock who played club rugby for Cardiff. He won seven caps for Wales and captained his country in their victory over the 1947 touring Australian team.

Two of his brothers, Tom and Ewart, also played first class rugby but they never represented their country.

== Rugby career ==
Tamplin first played club rugby for smaller second class clubs before joining Pontypool and then in 1939, Newport. Rugby was suspended for the duration of World War II and after the end of hostilities Tamplin joined Cardiff. Tamplin was selected to represent his country late in his rugby career when he was chosen to play, in the 1947 Five Nations Championship. Although missing the opening game against England, Tamplin was selected for the remaining three games of the tournament. His first cap was against Scotland, under the captaincy of Haydn Tanner. Wales enjoyed a high scoring victory, and Tamplin himself scored two conversions and a penalty goal. Tamplin also scored in the next two games of the Championship, with the winning penalty goal against France, and a conversion in the Irish match.

In December 1947 Tamplin was not only selected to play for Wales but would captain his country against the touring Australian in 1947. When Tamplin was selected to face Australia, he was still a Cardiff player, and as well as leading the Welsh team he also scored all the points in a victory over the Australians after two successful penalty kicks.

In the 1948 Five Nations Championship, Tamplin played in three games, drawing against England, beating Scotland, but most importantly, losing on home soil to France. France were at the time the weakest team in the tournament, and had failed to win in Wales on nine successive occasions. It would be Tamplin's final international game.

Tamplin also represented the invitational Barbarians.

=== International matches played ===
Wales

- Australia 1947
- England 1948
- France 1947, 1948
- Ireland 1947
- Scotland 1947, 1948

== Bibliography ==
- Smith, David; Williams, Gareth (1980). Fields of Praise: The Official History of The Welsh Rugby Union. Cardiff: University of Wales Press. ISBN 0-7083-0766-3.
- Thomas, Wayne (1979). A Century of Welsh Rugby Players. Ansells Ltd.
