= Phil Emery =

Australian cricketer (born 1964)

Personal information
- Full name: Philip Allen Emery
- Born: 25 June 1964 (age 62); St Ives, New South Wales, Australia
- Nickname: Phillthy, Slink, Fatty
- Batting: Left-handed
- Role: Wicket-keeper–batsman
- Relatives: Neville Emery (father)

International information
- National side: Australia
- Only Test (cap 362): 1 November 1994 v Pakistan
- ODI debut (cap 120): 30 October 1994 v Pakistan

Domestic team information
- Years: Team
- 1987/88–1998/99: New South Wales

Career statistics
Competition	Test	ODI
Matches	1	1
Runs scored	8	11
Batting average	–	–
100s/50s	0/0	0/0
Top score	8*	11*
Catches/stumpings	5/1	3/–
- Source: ESPNcricinfo, 12 December 2005

Philip Allen Emery (born 25 June 1964) is a former Australian cricketer. A wicket-keeper and valuable left-handed batsman, he represented Australia internationally and New South Wales domestically.

Born in St Ives, Sydney, Emery was educated at Newington College Preparatory School, Lindfield (1969–72), and Shore School, North Sydney (1973–1982). At Shore, he was captain of cricket and captain of rugby and subsequently represented GPS teams in both sports. He was also a very good swimmer and diver in his early school years. Emery represented Gordon at the Sydney Grade Cricket level. He then made his debut for the New South Wales Cricket team during the 1987–88 season replacing the previous wicketkeeper Greg Dyer.

Emery captained New South Wales to their 42nd Sheffield Shield title during the 1993–94 season while regular captain Mark Taylor was absent representing Australia.

He played in one Test and one ODI, both in Pakistan relieving Ian Healy who was out due to injury. This makes Emery only the third wicket-keeper (together with the long-serving Healy and Adam Gilchrist) to keep wicket in an Australian Test cricket team to Shane Warne (1992–2007) and Glenn McGrath (1993–2007) during their long Test careers.

Emery's cricket career is marked by notable achievements, including his record-breaking 378 dismissals in NSW First Class cricket and an additional 81 in One-Day matches. As captain, he led NSW to their 41st and 42nd Sheffield Shield titles in the 1992-93 and 1993-94 seasons. A key player in multiple title-winning teams, Emery scored over 3,000 first-class runs, including 17 fifties and a century, averaging over 26 runs. His career is celebrated for both his leadership and skill on the field.

After retiring from cricket, Emery became a corporate risk advisor and insurance broker. He is currently an Authorized Representative and a Director at Gow-Gates Insurance Brokers (Australasia) Pty Ltd. He holds a Bachelor's degree in Economics and a Diploma in Financial Services, and is recognized on the Mosman Municipal Council Sporting Wall of Fame.

== See also ==
- One-Test wonder
