= Neville Emery =

Australia international rugby union & league player & Rugby League coach

- Full name: Neville Allen Emery
- Born: 19 June 1924 Bexhill, NSW, Australia
- Died: 10 September 1991 (aged 67) Booyong, NSW, Australia
- School: Shore School
- Notable relative: Phil Emery (son)

Rugby union career
- Position: Fly-half
International career
Years	Team	Apps	(Points)
1947–49	Australia	10	(3)
- Rugby league career

Playing information
Club
Years	Team	Pld	T	G	FG	P
1951	Whitehaven

Coaching information
Club
Years	Team	Gms	W	D	L	W%
1951–56	Whitehaven

Neville Allen Emery (19 June 1924 — 10 September 1991) was an Australian rugby union international.

Raised in Lismore, Emery finished his schooling at Sydney Church of England Grammar School. He was a Combined GPS 1st XV captain and also played as a wicket-keeper for the GPS XI.

A RAAF officer during the war, Emery served with the No. 467 Squadron in the UK.

Emery, a fly-half, was renowned for his ball handling skills and played first-grade for Sydney University after the war. He was a member of the Wallabies between 1947 and 1949, gaining 10 Test caps, which included all five international matches on the 1947–48 tour of Britain, Ireland, France.

During the 1950s, Emery was based in England, captain-coaching Cumbrian rugby league club Whitehaven for several seasons. He also played cricket for Cumberland in the Minor Counties Championship.

Emery's son Phil was an Australian Test cricketer.

== See also ==
- List of Australia national rugby union players
