= Brian Piper =

- Full name: Brian James Piper
- Born: 16 September 1925 Narrabri, NSW, Australia
- Died: 10 April 1990 (aged 64)

Rugby union career
- Position: Fullback
International career
Years	Team	Apps	(Points)
1946–49	Australia	12	(18)

Brian James Piper (16 September 1925 — 10 April 1990) was an Australian rugby union international.

Piper, born in Narrabri, New South Wales, was a product of St Joseph's College and studied dentistry at the University of Sydney. He had a season of first-grade at Randwick, before playing his rugby for Sydney University.

A fullback, Piper was capped 12 times for the Wallabies. He gained his first call up for the 1946 tour of New Zealand, replacing the injured Ron Rankin in the squad a week before the team's departure, then made his Test debut against the All Blacks at Carisbrook. His career included the 1947–48 tour of Britain, Ireland and France, where he featured in all five Test matches. He made another tour to New Zealand in 1949 but ended up missing the Test series after injuring himself falling 15 feet from a hotel fire escape balcony, while trying to play a joke on his teammates.

== See also ==
- List of Australia national rugby union players
