= Joe Kraefft =

- Full name: Donald Frederick Kraefft
- Born: 20 July 1922 Sydney, Australia
- Died: 14 November 2010 (aged 88)

Rugby union career
- Position: Lock
International career
Years	Team	Apps	(Points)
1947–48	Australia	6	(0)

Donald Frederick Kraefft (20 July 1922 — 14 November 2010) was an Australian rugby union international.

Kraefft was educated at Sydney Church of England Grammar School and the University of Sydney.

A lock, Kraefft was a line-out specialist and played his first-grade rugby for Sydney University. He gained six Wallabies caps, debuting against the All Blacks at the SCG in 1947. His other five Test appearances were all on the 1947–48 tour of Britain, Ireland and France, where he was one of Australia's best forwards This was despite losing 15 lbs on the boat trip over, after developing a septic throat from swimming in the pool, missing the first five tour matches as a result.

Kraefft coached Sydney University for one first-grade season in 1951.

== See also ==
- List of Australia national rugby union players
