= Terry MacBride =

- Full name: John William Terrence MacBride
- Born: 12 February 1927 Sydney, NSW, Australia
- Died: 24 August 2019 (aged 92) Torquay, VIC, Australia
- School: Scots College
- University: University of Sydney

Rugby union career
- Position: Centre / Wing
International career
Years	Team	Apps	(Points)
1946–48	Australia	10	(3)

John William Terrence MacBride (12 February 1927 — 24 August 2019) was an Australian rugby union international.

MacBride, born in Sydney, was all-round sportsman during his years at Scots College, making the Combined GPS XV, vice-captaining the cricket XI and achieving colours in athletics. He briefly played first-grade rugby for Sydney University while studying medicine, but ended up leaving the course and joined Eastern Suburbs.

A three-quarter, MacBride was best suited to playing inside centre but spent his Wallabies career as a winger. He debuted at age 19 on the 1946 tour of New Zealand, where he played all three Test matches. The following year, MacBride was capped twice against the touring All Blacks, then earned selection for the 1947–48 tour of Britain, Ireland and France, featuring in all five Tests. Citing business commitments, MacBride announced his retirement from rugby in 1949.

== See also ==
- List of Australia national rugby union players
