= Barry Holmes =

England & Argentina international rugby union player

William Barry Holmes (6 January 1928 – 10 November 1949) was a rugby union player who played for the England national rugby union team and the Argentina national rugby union team. As of 2011 he is the only player to have been capped at senior level by both those two countries.

Holmes was born in Buenos Aires on 6 January 1928 to British parents. He was educated at St. George's College, Quilmes, and began his rugby union career playing for the Old Georgian Club in Buenos Aires. He travelled to Britain to continue his education at Queens' College, Cambridge and was selected to play for Cambridge University R.U.F.C. in The Varsity Match twice, playing on the wing in 1947 and at fullback in 1948. Holmes returned to Argentina in 1948 as part of the 1948 Oxford-Cambridge rugby union tour of Argentina, a touring team made up of players from both Cambridge University RUFC and Oxford University RFC which won all nine of its tour matches, including two against the Argentina national team.

Holmes's form for Cambridge University in the 1948–49 season led to two appearances in the trial matches for the England team and also an invitation to play for the Barbarians in their annual fixture against Leicester. His performance in the second trial match clinched his selection at fullback in England's team for their opening match of the 1949 Five Nations Championship against Wales at Cardiff Arms Park and he retained his place for the whole championship. Holmes won four caps for England and scored a conversion in each match against Ireland and France for a total of four points.

After playing on the Barbarians' 1949 tour of South Wales, Holmes returned to live in Argentina and was selected for the national team after only two games for Old Georgians. He was capped twice for Argentina against France in August and September 1949 but did not score any points. He was married in November 1949 and moved to Salta but died of typhoid fever on 10 November 1949, less than a week after his wedding.

England rugby historian Barry Bowker described Holmes as a "steady fullback" while Clem Thomas, a teammate at Cambridge and a Wales international himself, called him "a marvellous man and a great footballer" and said that the news of his death "depressed us enormously".
