= Phil Hardcastle =

- Born: 23 December 1919 Buenos Aires
- Died: 1962
- School: The Scots College
- University: Sydney University
- Occupation: Medical Practitioner

Rugby union career
- Position: Lock forward
Amateur team(s)
Years	Team	Apps	(Points)
- Eastern Suburbs
–	Sydney Uni		
Provincial / State sides
Years	Team	Apps	(Points)
1938-50	NSW	9	
International career
Years	Team	Apps	(Points)
1946 - 1949	Australia	5	(0)

Phil Hardcastle (1919–1962) was an Australian rugby union footballer and medical practitioner. A state and national representative forward, he played five Test matches for Australia, one as captain.

== Early life ==
Hardcastle was born in Buenos Aires, Argentina and attended The Scots College in Sydney. He undertook medical studies at Sydney University in the years immediately before and during World War II and won university blues for rugby in 1937, 1939 and 1941.

== Representative rugby career ==
His state representative debut was made for New South Wales in 1938. He was still playing for Sydney University and playing well when national representative fixtures restarted at the conclusion of World War II. He was selected on the first Australian post-war tour, the 1946 Wallaby tour of New Zealand captained by Bill McLean. He played in three Tests and seven tour matches proving his capability as a durable tight forward, formidable in the ruck.

In 1947 he captained New South Wales to a victory over the touring All Blacks and was honoured with national captaincy in one of the Tests of that tour. He was vying against McLean for the tour captaincy of the 1947-48 Wallaby Tour and when Queensland won the interstate selection series that year, McLean was given the honour. Hardcastle played twenty-two matches on the tour including the final UK match against the Barbarians. He did not play in any Tests.

He returned to the Test arena in 1949 playing against the New Zealand Māori in Sydney. His final representative appearance was for New South Wales in 1950 against the British Isles.

== Playing style ==
Though a tall man Hardcastle was not a proficient jumper and often adopted spoiling tactics to prevent opposition locks getting above him in the line-out. The writer Howell toured and played alongside Hardcastle on the 1947-48 Tour and asserts that this habit led to various incidents when opposition forwards would get-square with Hardcastle to warn him off from holding them down in the jump.

Howell also notes that Hardcastle had a lifelong stutter. This affected his ability to communicate quickly on-field but also led to an amusing incident on the 1947-48 tour when Hardcastle was nominated after the Swansea match to give the traditional visitor's response to the after-dinner speech. When tour manager Arnold Tancred called upon "the esteemed Dr Phil Hardcastle" to reply, Hardcastle got to his feet and said "Gee-gee-gee-gentlemen, w-w-words f-f-fail me" and sat down.

Preceded by Bill McLean	Australian national rugby union captain 1947	Succeeded by Trevor Allan

== Published references ==
- Howell, Max (2005) Born to Lead - Wallaby Test Captains, Celebrity Books, Auckland NZ
