= Mac Henderson =

Scotland international rugby union player and then businessman

- Born: James McLaren Henderson; 1 May 1907 Elphinstone, East Lothian, Scotland
- Died: 5 March 2009 (aged 101) Haddington, East Lothian, Scotland

Rugby union career
- Position: No.8
Amateur team(s)
Years	Team	Apps	(Points)
- Dunbar
- Edinburgh Academicals
1928-31	Waipukurau		
1931-33	Edinburgh Academicals		
–	Haddington		
Provincial / State sides
Years	Team	Apps	(Points)
1932	Edinburgh District		
International career
Years	Team	Apps	(Points)
1933	Scotland	3	(0)

James McLaren Henderson (1 May 1907 – 5 March 2009), better known as Mac Henderson, was a Scotland international rugby union player and then businessman, founding one of Edinburgh's most famous restaurants, Henderson's.

== Rugby Union career ==
=== Amateur career ===
Henderson was born in 1907 in Elphinstone, near Tranent and attended Edinburgh Academy. On leaving school her played for Dunbar but he then moved to Edinburgh where he played for Edinburgh Academicals.

A farmer by trade, Henderson also worked on New Zealand sheep stations. While in New Zealand he played rugby union for the Hawkes Bay side Waipukarau.

Before he could be selected to play for the provincial Hawkes Bay side, he was moved to another sheep station. Henderson recalled: "An official said he would eat his hat if I wasn't selected for Hawke's Bay".

On his return to Scotland, he again played for Edinburgh Academicals.

He also played rugby union for Haddington.

=== Provincial career ===
He played for Edinburgh District in their inter-city match against Glasgow District on 3 December 1932. Edinburgh won the match 15–3.

=== International career ===
He was capped three times by Scotland, all in 1933. Scotland won all 3 matches and secured the Triple Crown.

His career in rugby came to an abrupt end after he received a serious ligament injury while on a tour with the Barbarians later that year.

== Business career ==
=== Farming ===
Henderson had a farm in East Lothian.

In 1962, Henderson and his wife opened a farm shop in Edinburgh as an outlet for their produce.

=== Restaurateur ===
In 1963, they opened a vegetarian restaurant, Henderson's in Hanover Street in the centre of Edinburgh, "which has long since established itself as an institution in the city."

== Family ==
Henderson met Janet Millar, while playing tennis at a friend's home at Gullane. Millar was an architect's daughter and in 1932 the couple married in a society wedding in Troon. His wife had been told she could not have children, but she believed that a healthy, vegetarian diet would make her fertile. The couple went on to have seven children; five sons named Andrew, John, Peter, Nicholas and Oliver; two daughters, Sara and Catherine. At his death Henderson had 14 grandchildren and nine great-grandchildren.

His brother Ian was also an international rugby player.

== Legacy ==
On the occasion of his 100th birthday in 2007, Scottish Rugby held a lunch in honour of Henderson at Murrayfield Stadium. He was the first of Scotland's international players to become a centenarian.

He died on 5 March 2009 at the age of 101 as the longest-lived Test player in rugby union history.
