= Gwyn Evans (rugby union, born 1918) =

Wales international rugby union player

- Full name: Gwynfryn Evans
- Born: 17 August 1918 Treherbert, Wales
- Died: 6 September 2010 (aged 92) Cardiff, Wales

Rugby union career
- Position: Wing-forward
International career
Years	Team	Apps	(Points)
1947–49	Wales	12	(3)

Gwynfryn Evans (17 August 1918 – 6 September 2010) was a Welsh international rugby union player.

== Biography ==
Born in Treherbert, Evans grew up in the village of Clydach outside Swansea and got his start in rugby aged 11. He played briefly for Swansea prior to World War II, but on joining the Cardiff Police Force was requested to quit due to the physical nature of the sport, so switched to soccer. During the war, Evans served with the Royal Engineers in Italy and North Africa.

Evans resumed his club rugby after the war, linking up with Cardiff. He was a specialist openside wing-forward and made his Wales debut in the country's first official post war fixture in 1947, as one of 13 new caps against England at Cardiff Arms Park, where he contributed a try. Over the next two years, Evans was a regular for Wales and attained a total of 12 caps, without missing a match. This included their win over the touring 1947–48 Wallabies in Cardiff.

Retiring from rugby at age 41, Evans became a high ranking policeman and at one time was in charge of policing for Cardiff Arms Park, in his capacity as a Superintendent at Cardiff Central. He received the Queen's Police Medal for his career with the police.

== See also ==
- List of Wales national rugby union players
