= Charlie McDonald (rugby union) =

Scottish rugby union player

- Born: 19 April 1919 Jedburgh, Scotland
- Died: August 2005 (aged 86)

Rugby union career
- Position: Utility back
International career
Years	Team	Apps	(Points)
1947	Scotland	1	(3)

Charles McDonald (19 April 1919 – August 2005) was a Scottish international rugby union player.

Born in Jedburgh, McDonald could play a variety of backline positions and was quick off the mark.

McDonald played as a wing three-quarter in his solitary Scotland appearance against the touring Wallabies at Murrayfield in 1947, having been called into the team when Charlie Drummond pulled out with influenza.

In the 1950s, McDonald was a prolific points-scorer playing for Brighton and Sussex.

McDonald was the uncle of Jed-Forest and Scotland winger David Rose.

== See also ==
- List of Scotland national rugby union players
