= Jack Baxter (rugby union) =

- Full name: Archie John Baxter
- Born: 30 August 1920 Camperdown, Sydney, Australia
- Died: 26 August 2004 (aged 83)

Rugby union career
- Position: Prop
International career
Years	Team	Apps	(Points)
1949–52	Australia	9	(0)

Archie John Baxter (30 August 1920 – 26 August 2004) was an Australian rugby union international.

Born in Sydney, Baxter was educated at Marist College Kogarah and grew up playing rugby league.

Baxter, following wartime service with the Royal Australian Navy, played first-grade rugby for Eastern Suburbs. He debuted for the Wallabies in the 1949 home Tests against NZ Maori and won more caps on that year's successful tour of New Zealand, the first Bledisloe Cup series win over the All Blacks since 1934.

In 1950 Baxter was seriously injured in an accidental explosion on HMAS Tarakan berthed on Sydney Harbour, which killed seven sailors. Suffering severe burns to his back and legs, he was unconscious for a week and close to death, spending a total of nine months in hospital.

Baxter defied doctor's expectations to return to rugby union, playing further Bledisloe Cup series in 1951 and 1952.

== See also ==
- List of Australia national rugby union players
