= Norman Bennett =

English sportsman

Personal information
- Full name: Norman Osborn Bennett
- Born: 21 September 1922; Putney, London, England
- Died: 7 July 2005 (aged 82); Dinckley, Lancashire, England
- Nickname: Nobby
- Batting: Right-handed

Domestic team information
- Years: Team
- 1946: Worcestershire

Career statistics
Competition	FC
Matches	1
Runs scored	10
Batting average	5.00
100s/50s	0/0
Top score	8
Balls bowled	0
Wickets	0
Bowling average	-
5 wickets in innings	0
10 wickets in match	0
Best bowling	-
Catches/stumpings	1/0
- Source: Cricinfo, 1 December 2008

Norman Osborn Bennett (21 September 1922 – 7 July 2005), sometimes known as Nobby, was an English sportsman. He played rugby union for England, and played one game of first-class cricket, an unsuccessful outing for Worcestershire against the Combined Services in 1946.

He was educated at Epsom College and St Mary's Hospital. His parents were Norman And Katherine Bennett. His father ran a large milk delivery company in the south London area. He had three siblings, Elizabeth, Audrey and June. He qualified as a doctor from St Maryshospital in London and served in the Royal Navy in the late 1940s as a doctor. He played rugby for England several times in the 1947 season and also for the Royal Navy and United Services. He married Rosalie, the daughter of a doctor in Wigan and settled in there as a GP. He and Rosalie had three children and currently has four grandchildren. After retiring from the NHS he lived in the Ribble valley and farmed a small farm on the Ribble. His cousin farms in Worcester which is the base for the Bennett family.
