= David MacKenzie (rugby union) =

Scotland international rugby union player

David Mackenzie
- Born: David Douglas Mackenzie; 6 April 1923 Wallsend on Tyne, England
- Died: 4 August 2005 (aged 82) Vancouver, Canada

Rugby union career
- Position: Wing
Amateur team(s)
Years	Team	Apps	(Points)
- Edinburgh University
Provincial / State sides
Years	Team	Apps	(Points)
- Edinburgh District
-	Scotland Probables		
International career
Years	Team	Apps	(Points)
1947-48	Scotland	6	(0)

David Douglas Mackenzie (28 December 1921 – 4 August 2005) was a Scotland international rugby union player.

== Rugby union career ==
Mackenzie played for Edinburgh University. He was capped by Edinburgh District to play against Glasgow District in the inter-city match of 1947, scoring a try in the match. He represented the Scotland Probables side in 1947.

=== International career ===
He was capped six times between 1947 and 1948 on the wing.
