= Jack Firth =

English cricketer

Personal information
- Full name: Jack Firth
- Born: 26 June 1917; Cottingley, Bradford, Yorkshire, England
- Died: 6 September 1981 (aged 64); Bradford, Yorkshire, England
- Batting: Right-handed
- Role: Wicketkeeper

Domestic team information
- Years: Team
- 1949–1950: Yorkshire
- 1951–1958: Leicestershire

Career statistics
Competition	First-class
Matches	235
Runs scored	3,588
Batting average	14.58
100s/50s	–/6
Top score	90*
Catches/stumpings	372/96
- Source: CricketArchive, 4 December 2024

Jack Firth (27 June 1917 – 7 September 1981) was an English first-class cricketer, who played eight games for Yorkshire County Cricket Club in 1949 and 1950, and 223 matches for Leicestershire from 1951 to 1958. He also appeared in two games for the Minor Counties in 1950, and two more for the M.C.C. in 1954.

Born in Cottingley, Yorkshire, England, Firth was a specialist wicket-keeper. A right-handed lower order batsman, his best was an innings of 90 not out against Essex. He was awarded his Leicestershire cap in 1951, and his Leicestershire benefit season was held in 1958.
