= Bob McMaster =

Australia dual-code rugby international player & wrestler

Personal information
- Full name: Robert Esmond McMaster
- Born: 15 January 1921 Rockhampton, Australia
- Died: 1 August 2003 (aged 82) Brisbane, Australia

Playing information
- Height: 5 ft 11 in (180 cm)
- Weight: 16 st 0 lb (102 kg)

Rugby union
- Position: Prop
Club
Years	Team	Pld	T	G	FG	P
1946–47	Brothers Old Boys
Representative
Years	Team	Pld	T	G	FG	P
1946–47	Australia	7	0	1	0	2

Rugby league
- Position: Prop
Club
Years	Team	Pld	T	G	FG	P
1948–52	Leeds
1952–≥1952	Past Brothers
	Total	0	0	0	0	0
Representative
Years	Team	Pld	T	G	FG	P
1949	British Empire	1
1949–52	Other Nationalities	6
- Source: -

Robert Esmond McMaster (15 January 1921 – 1 August 2003), also known by the nickname of "Wallaby Bob", was an Australian wrestler, rugby union and professional rugby league footballer. He played in the 1940s and 1950s, and was a wrestling referee in the 1960s and 1970s. He played representative level rugby union (RU) for Australia, and at club level for Brothers Old Boys, as a prop, and representative level rugby league (RL) for Other Nationalities and British Empire, and at club level for Leeds and Past Brothers, as a prop.

== Background ==
McMaster was born in Rockhampton, Queensland, Australia, he was a pupil at Kelvin Grove State School, and then at St Joseph's College, Gregory Terrace, he retired from participative sport in the late 1950s to become the owner of the Wallaby Hotel at Mudgeeraba, Gold Coast hinterland, he sold the hotel in 1979 and retired to Tallai, Queensland to concentrate on trotting, the horses were sold off in the early 1990s, he suffered a heart attack while attending a presentation ceremony by the Australian Rugby Union at the Brisbane Convention & Exhibition Centre, and he died aged 82 in Brisbane, Australia.

== International honours ==
Bob McMaster won caps for Australia (RU) while at Brothers Old Boys in 1946 against New Zealand, New Zealand Māori, and New Zealand, in 1947 against New Zealand (two matches), and on the 1947–48 Australia rugby union tour of Britain, Ireland, France and North America in 1947 against Ireland, and Wales, represented British Empire (RL) while at Leeds in 1949 against France, and won caps for Other Nationalities (RL) while at Leeds in 1949 against England, Wales, in 1950 against France (two matches), in 1951 against France, and in 1952 against England.

== Wrestling ==
Bob McMaster made his début as a professional wrestler in London during 1949, he was trained in Australia by former wrestler Samuel Burmister, he toured South Africa in mid-1956, and later became a referee for World Championship Wrestling (Australia).

== Genealogical information ==
Bob McMaster was married (1948–61) to Joyce May (née Hamilton, (c. 1920s–January 2019), and married (1966–) the dancer Dawn Butler. He was the father of Jim McMaster, the comedian and impressionist Danny McMaster, and the grandfather (Danny McMaster's son) of the association football (soccer) player Griffin McMaster.
