= Graeme Jackson =

Scotland international rugby union player

Graeme Jackson OBE MBE
- Full name: Thomas Graeme Hogarth Jackson
- Born: 15 October 1921 Sidcup, Kent, England
- Died: 21 May 2010 (aged 88) Stoke Goldington, Bucks, England
- School: Cheltenham College
- Occupation: British Army officer

Rugby union career
- Position: Wing
International career
| Years | Team | Apps | (Points) |
| 1947–49 | Scotland | 12 | (6) |

Brigadier Thomas Graeme Hogarth Jackson (15 October 1921 – 21 May 2010) was a British Army officer and Scotland international rugby union player of the 1940s.

Jackson was born in Sidcup, Kent, and grew up in Gloucestershire, attending Cheltenham College. He represented the Scottish Schoolboys rugby side, qualifying by virtue of his father, an ex-Motherwell footballer and plastic surgeon originally from Lanarkshire. After enlisting in 1940, Jackson was commissioned into the Royal Corps of Signals and served with Paiforce in the Middle East during World War II.

A wing three-quarter, Jackson was known to possess considerable pace, having won a Gloucestershire 100 yards sprint championship title in his youth. He played rugby in the services, as well as for Cheltenham and London Scottish. In the late 1940s, Jackson was a regular on the wing for Scotland. He first featured in the 1945–46 Victory Internationals, before gaining an official cap in the 1947 Five Nations. Over three years, Jackson amassed 12 Scotland caps and scored one try, in their win over France at Murrayfield in 1948.

Jackson was mentioned in dispatches serving with the 1st Commonwealth Divisional Signals in Korea. On a posting to the Australia Royal Australian Corps of Signals, Jackson helped plan evacuations for the 1955 Hunter Valley floods. He reached the rank of Brigadier and at the time of his retirement was Deputy Assistant Chief of Staff with Communications and Electronics at the Supreme Headquarters Allied Powers Europe.

== See also ==
- List of Scotland national rugby union players
