= Martin Turner (rugby union) =

England international rugby union player

- Full name: Martin Frederick Turner
- Born: 1 August 1921 Croydon, England
- Died: 7 April 2009 (aged 87)
- School: Whitgift School
- University: St Catharine's College, Cambridge

Rugby union career
- Position: Wing
International career
Years	Team	Apps	(Points)
1948	England	2	(0)

Martin Frederick Turner (1 August 1921 – 7 April 2009) was an English international rugby union player.

Turner was raised in Croydon and attended Whitgift School through the 1930s, excelling in athletics, cricket and rugby.

A wing three-quarter, Turner attained a rugby blue while studying at St Catharine's College, Cambridge. He also played rugby for the Blackheath and Old Whitgiftian clubs. In 1948, Turner gained two England caps, playing Five Nations matches against Scotland and France, both in away fixtures.

Turner served as president of both Surrey Rugby Football Union and the Surrey County Cricket Club.

== See also ==
- List of England national rugby union players
