= John Fuller (rugby union) =

- Full name: John George Fuller
- Born: 18 May 1920 Sydney, NSW, Australia
- Died: 2 December 2003 (aged 83)
- School: Cranbrook School
- University: University of Sydney

Rugby union career
- Position: Forward
Provincial / State sides
Years	Team	Apps	(Points)
- New South Wales
International career
Years	Team	Apps	(Points)
1947–48	Australia		

John George Fuller (18 May 1920 – 2 December 2003) was an Australian international rugby union player.

Fuller was educated at Cranbrook School and the University of Sydney, where he studied medicine. He made his first-grade debut for the university in 1939, before his career was stalled by the war. A lieutenant with the 2/18th Battalion, Fuller fought along the Malayan peninsula and in 1942 was captured by the Japanese in Singapore. He was initially interned at Changi Prison, then sent to a prisoner of war camp in Japan, remaining there until the war's end in 1945.

A forward, Fuller recovered sufficiently to return to rugby and made his New South Wales debut as a front-rower in 1946, scoring a try in their win over Toowoomba. He was used as a breakaway in a later fixture against Queensland and it was in this position he got selected by the Wallabies for their 1947–48 northern hemisphere tour. Although not required for the Test matches, Fuller featured often in tour fixtures, making 11 uncapped appearances.

== See also ==
- List of Australia national rugby union players
