= Eddie Broad =

- Born: Edmund George Broad; 3 January 1921 Brisbane, Queensland
- Died: 30 December 1993
- Occupation(s): Lawyer, Judge

Rugby union career
- Position: fly-half
International career
Years	Team	Apps	(Points)
1949–49	Wallabies	1	(0)

Edmund George "Eddie" Broad (3 January 1921 – c. 1993) was a rugby union player who represented Australia.

Broad, a fly-half, was born in Brisbane, Queensland and claimed one international rugby cap for Australia. He was selected in the 1947–48 Australia rugby union tour of the British Isles, Ireland, France and North America where he played in tour matches but no Tests.
