= Clem Windsor =

Australia international rugby union player

- Born: John Clement Windsor; 2 February 1923 Brisbane, Queensland
- Died: 25 January 2007 (aged 83)
- School: St Joseph's College, Gregory Terrace
- University: University of Queensland

Rugby union career
- Position: fullback
Amateur team(s)
Years	Team	Apps	(Points)
- University of Queensland Rugby Club
–	Middlesex Hospital		
–	Leicester		
–	London Irish		
Provincial / State sides
Years	Team	Apps	(Points)
1945–1947	Queensland		
International career
Years	Team	Apps	(Points)
1947	Australia	1	(0)

Dr. John Clement "Clem" Windsor (2 February 1923 – 25 January 2007) was a rugby union player who represented Australia and a surgeon.

== Rugby career ==
Windsor was born in Brisbane, Queensland and played fullback in club rugby for the University of Queensland Rugby Club. He made his debut for Queensland in 1945. Two years later he made his test debut for the Wallabies, becoming the 353th player to do so and the tenth from the UQ rugby club. Windsor only played one test, the second Bledisloe Cup match of 1947 played at the Sydney Cricket Ground, where the All Blacks defeated Australia 27 points to 14. After this teat, he was named in the squad for the 1947–48 Australia rugby union tour of Britain, Ireland, France and North America. After the tour was completed, Windsor returned to England and played for Middlesex Hospital, Leicester and London Irish. He retired from rugby in 1951 after a knee injury cut his final game short.

== Medical career ==
Windsor graduated from St Joseph's College, Gregory Terrace in 1939. He then went on to study medicine at the University of Queensland. After graduating, Windsor began his twelve-month residency at the Mater Hospital. While living in England, Windsor worked at the Leicester City General Hospital and in 1950 gained his FRCS both of Edinburgh and England. In 1954, Windsor gained his FRACS and was appointed Gastric Surgeon to the Mater Hospital. In 1957, he moved to the newly opened Princess Alexandra Hospital where he was the hospital's Gastroscopist until 1970. Windsor was appointed Senior Surgeon at the hospital in 1971, a position he would keep until 1983, when he was appointed Clinical Warden in the University Department of Surgery. Then, in 1986 he was appointed co-ordinator of Postgraduate Surgical Studies until 1991.

== Personal life ==
While working at Leicester General Hospital, Windsor met Patricia Lee and after a short courtship, he proposed to her on Australia Day in 1953. They were married on 1 July 1953 and sailed for Australia aboard the Tasmanian Star in August that year. Together they had nine children.

== Death ==
Windsor died on 23 January 2007 at the age of 83, and a requiem mass was held at Our Lady Help of Christians Catholic Church at Hendra on 29 January before his burial at the Nudgee Catholic Cemetery.
