= Leslie Currie =

- Full name: Leslie Robert Currie
- Born: 25 November 1921 Dunfermline, Scotland
- Died: 7 August 1983 (aged 61)

Rugby union career
- Position: Second-row
International career
Years	Team	Apps	(Points)
1947–49	Scotland	8	(0)

Leslie Robert Currie (25 November 1921 — 7 August 1983) was a Scottish international rugby union player.

Currie, the son of a Dunfermline solicitor, attended Dunfermline High School and University of Edinburgh. He served in Italy and Greece with the Royal Engineers in World War II.

A second-row forward, Currie gained eight Scotland caps between 1947 and 1949. His regular club was Dunfermline RFC and he also played varsity rugby during his tertiary studies in Edinburgh.

== See also ==
- List of Scotland national rugby union players
