= Richard Madge =

England international rugby union player

- Full name: Richard John Palmer Madge
- Born: 19 December 1914 Exeter, England
- Died: 22 November 1996 (aged 81) Exeter, England

Rugby union career
- Position: Scrum-half
International career
Years	Team	Apps	(Points)
1948	England	4	(0)

Richard John Palmer Madge (19 December 1914 – 22 November 1996) was an English rugby union player.

Born in Exeter, Madge served with the Royal Artillery during the war, before getting called up by England at the back end of his career. He was capped four times as England scrum-half in 1948, debuting against the Wallabies at Twickenham. A knee ligament injury, suffered nine minutes into a Five Nations match against Scotland, ended his run in the side and ruled him out for the remainder of the season.

Madge, a surveyor by profession, was managing director of a building firm.

== See also ==
- List of England national rugby union players
