= Keith Windon =

- Born: Keith Stanley Windon; 2 October 1917 Randwick, New South Wales
- Died: 14 February 1998 (aged 80)

Rugby union career
- Position: flanker
International career
Years	Team	Apps	(Points)
1937, 1946	Wallabies	3	(0)

Keith Stanley Windon (2 October 1917 – 14 February 1998) was a rugby union player who represented Australia.

Windon, a flanker, was born in Randwick, New South Wales and claimed a total of 3 international rugby caps for Australia.
