= Charlie Eastes =

Australian rugby union player

- Full name: Charles Colbram Eastes
- Born: 12 July 1925 Sydney, Australia
- Died: 21 August 1995 (aged 70)

Rugby union career
- Position: Wing
International career
| Years | Team | Apps | (Points) |
| 1946–49 | Australia | 6 | (6) |

Charles Colbram Eastes MBE (12 July 1925 – 21 August 1995) was an Australian rugby union international.

== Early life ==
A native of Sydney, Eastes attended Manly Boys' High School and played his junior rugby with local club St. Matthews. He scored 14 tries as a centre in his debut first-grade season for Manly in 1943 before his career was interrupted by war service. During the conflict, Eastes was a Corporal in the Royal Australian Air Force and had two tours to New Guinea.

== Wallabies career ==
Eastes scored a hat-trick of tries for New South Wales against Queensland in 1946 and was selected for that year's tour of New Zealand with the Wallabies. In his first tour match, against North Auckland, he scored another three tries to earn a Test debut on the left wing against the All Blacks at Carisbrook. He was on the 1947–48 tour of Britain, Ireland and France, but missed the Test matches after fracturing his forearm in a tour match against Newport, attempting a tackle on Ken Jones. He continued to play for the Wallabies until 1949 and was capped six times in total.

== Administration ==
Eastes was first-grade coach and club president of Manly in the early 1960s, then in 1969 was Wallabies team manager on the tour of South Africa. Awarded an MBE in the 1978 New Year Honours for services to sport, he had an extensive administrative career in rugby, serving as President of both the Sydney Rugby Union and NSWRU, as well as Vice President of the Australian Rugby Union. He was inducted into the Rugby Australia Hall of Fame in 2013.

== See also ==
- List of Australia national rugby union players
