= Alan Walker (Australian sportsman) =

Australian sportsman

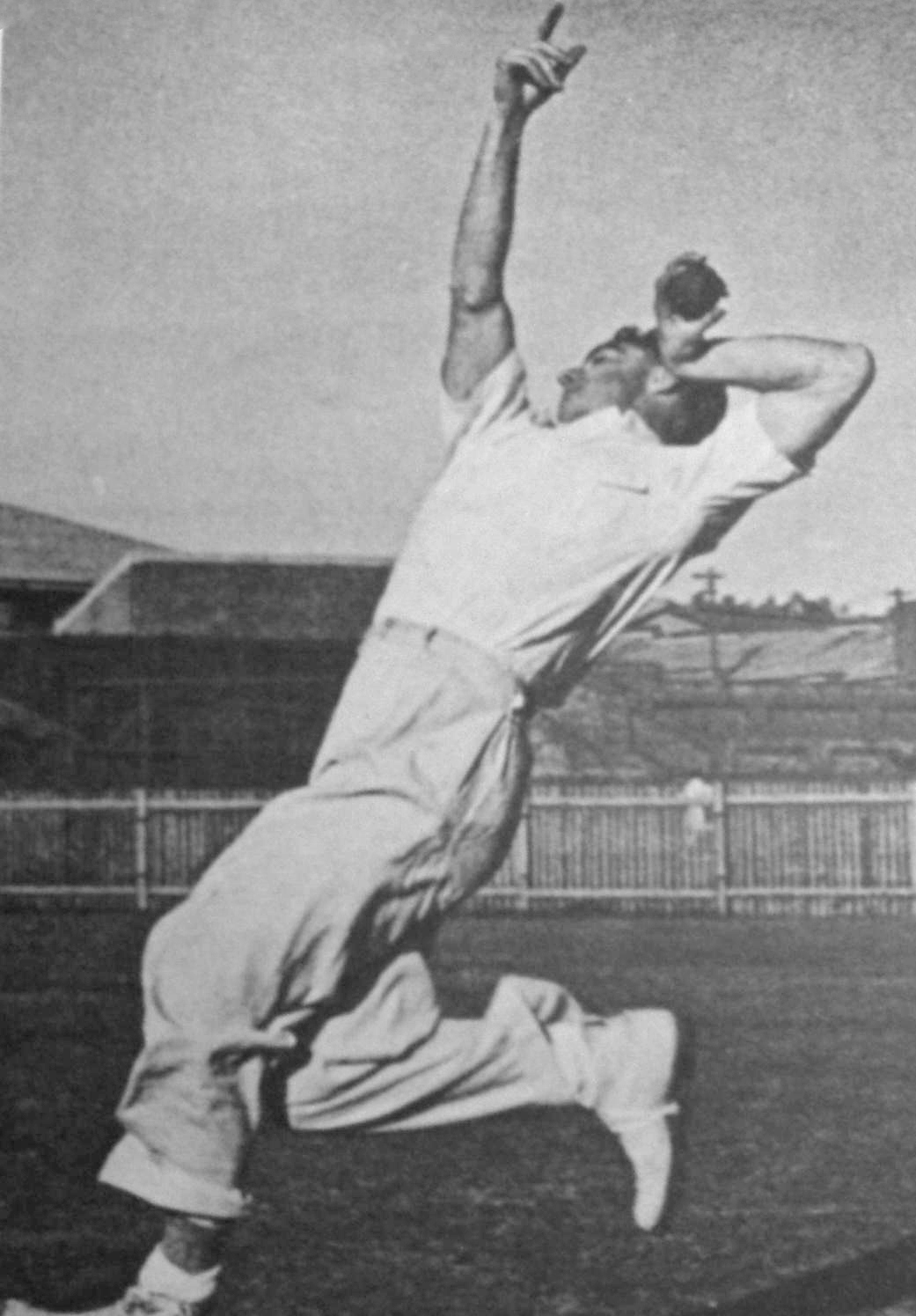
- Alan Walker bowling

Personal information
- Full name: Alan Keith Walker
- Born: 4 October 1925 Australia
- Died: 19 June 2005 (aged 79) Australia

Playing information

Rugby union
Representative
Years	Team	Pld	T	G	FG	P
1947–50	Australia	5	19	0	0	76

Rugby league
- Position: Centre
Club
Years	Team	Pld	T	G	FG	P
1952	Manly	1	0	0	0	0
1953–54	Leigh RLFC	9	2	0	0	6
	Total	10	2	0	0	6
- As of 30 Jul 2021
- Cricket career

Cricket information
- Batting: Left-handed
- Bowling: Left-arm fast-medium

Domestic team information
- Years: Team
- 1948/49: New South Wales
- 1956: Nottinghamshire

Career statistics
Competition	First-class
Matches	94
Runs scored	1,603
Batting average	17.42
100s/50s	0/8
Top score	73
Balls bowled	15,178
Wickets	221
Bowling average	27.47
5 wickets in innings	9
10 wickets in match	0
Best bowling	7/56
Catches/stumpings	37/–
- Source: Cricinfo, 6 October 2024

Alan Keith Walker (4 October 1925 – 19 June 2005) was an Australian sportsman. He played rugby union for his country, winning five caps, and scored 19 tries on the tour to Britain and France in 1947–48, including a memorable effort against England at Twickenham stadium. He also played two home Tests against the British & Irish Lions in 1950 before deciding to concentrate his attentions on cricket, which he played as a left-arm fast-medium bowler. In the 1952 NSWRFL season he played first-grade rugby league for Manly-Warringah and Leigh RLFC.

As a cricketer, Walker made his first-class debut for New South Wales at The Gabba in 1948/49 and played for the state until the 1952/53 season. He was selected for the 1949/50 tour of South Africa led by Lindsay Hassett, but was behind the likes of Keith Miller and Ray Lindwall in the pecking order and never played Test cricket. He later played county cricket in England for Nottinghamshire, taking 55 wickets in the 1956 season.

He performed the unusual feat of taking four wickets in four balls for Nottinghamshire against Leicestershire at Leicester in 1956. Uniquely, he took the last wicket of Leicestershire's first innings (Jack Firth), and then the first three wickets of the second innings with his first three balls (Gerry Lester, Maurice Tompkin and Gerald Smithson).

Walker died at the age of 79 in June 2005.
