= Jim Stenmark =

- Full name: James Thomas Ossian Stenmark
- Born: 6 November 1924 Coraki, NSW, Australia
- Died: 10 November 2008 (aged 84) Sydney, NSW, Australia
- Height: 6 ft 3 in (191 cm)
- School: St. Ignatius' College, Riverview

Rugby union career
- Position: Forward
Provincial / State sides
Years	Team	Apps	(Points)
1946–48	New South Wales		
International career
Years	Team	Apps	(Points)
1947–48	Australia		

James Thomas Ossian Stenmark (6 November 1924 – 10 November 2008) was an Australian rugby union player.

Stenmark was born in Coraki and attended Saint Ignatius' College, Riverview.

Tall and wiry, Stenmark was a versatile forward and capable goal-kicker, selected by the Wallabies from Sydney University for the 1947/48 tours of the British Isles and North America. He featured in over 20 tour matches, without earning a cap, and even acted as touch judge in a fixture against the Barbarians.

Stenmark, a dental surgeon by profession, lectured in dentistry at Wagga Base Hospital during his later years.

== See also ==
- List of Australia national rugby union players
