= Ian Henderson (rugby union) =

Scotland international rugby union player

- Born: Ian Cowe Henderson; 31 October 1918 Tranent, East Lothian, Scotland
- Died: 11 June 1991 (aged 72) Haddington, East Lothian, Scotland

Rugby union career
- Position: Prop
Amateur team(s)
Years	Team	Apps	(Points)
- Edinburgh Academicals
Provincial / State sides
Years	Team	Apps	(Points)
- Edinburgh District
-	Scotland Probables		
International career
Years	Team	Apps	(Points)
1939-48	Scotland	8	(0)

Ian Henderson (31 October 1918 – 11 June 1991) was a Scotland international rugby union player.

== Rugby Union career ==
=== Amateur career ===
He played for Edinburgh Academicals RFC.

=== Provincial career ===
He was capped for Edinburgh District. He represented Scotland Probables in 1947.

=== International career ===
He was capped eight times for Scotland between 1939 and 1948.

== Family ==
His brother James McLaren Henderson – Mac Henderson – was also capped for Scotland, and became the oldest living Scottish international in his later years.
