= Hamish Dawson =

Scotland international rugby union player

- Born: James Cooper Dawson; 29 October 1925
- Died: 19 October 2007 (aged 81) Mauchline, Scotland
- School: Glasgow Academy; Strathallan School
- University: The Queen's College, Oxford
- Occupation(s): Chartered accountant Managing Director

Rugby union career
- Position: Lock / Prop
Amateur team(s)
Years	Team	Apps	(Points)
-	Oxford University		
–	Glasgow Academicals		
–	London Scottish		
–	Barbarians		
Provincial / State sides
Years	Team	Apps	(Points)
-	Glasgow District		
-	Cities		
-	Scotland Probables		
International career
Years	Team	Apps	(Points)
1947–1953	Scotland	20	(3)

James 'Hamish' Cooper Dawson (29 October 1925 – 19 October 2007) was a rugby union international who represented Scotland from 1947 to 1953 gaining 20 caps.

== Rugby Union career ==
=== Amateur career ===
Dawson was educated at Glasgow Academy, Strathallan School in Perthshire and The Queen's College, Oxford. He was a talented all-round sportsman, particularly swimming, cricket and rugby. Dawson received a blue for Oxford University, playing against Cambridge University in the 1943–44 season.

He played club rugby for Glasgow Academicals RFC, London Scottish FC and the Barbarians FC.

=== Provincial career ===
Dawson was capped for Glasgow District.

He played for the Cities District side in their match against Australia in October 1947.

He turned out for the Scotland Probables side in 1947.

=== International career ===
Dawson made his debut for Scotland in a 16–7 loss to Australia at Murrayfield during their 1947–48 tour of Great Britain, one of eight new Scotland caps that day. His first three caps were played at lock, which included a 9–8 victory over France at Murrayfield and a 14–0 loss to Wales in Cardiff in the 1948 Five Nations Championship.

Dawson's next seventeen caps were played at prop starting with an 8–0 victory over France in the 1949 Five Nations Championship in Paris. This was followed by a 6–5 win over Wales at Murrayfield and a 13–3 defeat to Ireland at the same venue. He played all four matches in the 1950 Five Nations Championship, starting with a third consecutive victory over France, 8–5 in Edinburgh. Scotland lost 12–0 to Wales and 21–0 to Ireland in Cardiff and Dublin respectively. Regaining some pride with a 13–11 win against England at Murrayfield.

In 1951 Dawson played on five occasions for Scotland, starting with a 14–12 loss to France in Paris. On 3 February, he scored his only points for Scotland with a try in a 19–0 win against Wales at Murrayfield. Three weeks later Scotland lost narrowly to Ireland, 6–5 in Edinburgh, starting a run of 17 consecutive matches without a win, lasting until 1955. Dawson also played in the 5–3 defeat to England at Twickenham; Scotland avoiding the 1951 Five Nations Championship wooden spoon on points difference. Later that year Scotland suffered a record 44–0 loss to South Africa at Murrayfield, with South Africa losing only once on their 31-game 1951–52 rugby tour.

Dawson played in all four matches of the 1952 Five Nations Championship. Scotland losing all four matches: 13–11 to France in Edinburgh, 11–0 to Wales in Cardiff, 12–8 to Ireland in Dublin and 19–3 to England at Murrayfield. Dawson played his last match for Scotland against England at Twickenham in a 26–8 loss in the 1953 Five Nations Championship, Scotland receiving the 'wooden spoon' for the second consecutive year.

== Military career ==
In 1943 he joined the Royal Naval Volunteer Reserve, initially serving as a midshipman based at HMS King Alfred and then transferring to HMS Ulysses (R69) in the British Pacific Fleet. Dawson then served as a sub-lieutenant on a minesweeper in Hong Kong until December 1946.

== Outside of rugby ==
After the war, he qualified as a chartered accountant in 1948. He rose through the ranks of Ritchies Paper Products Limited finally becoming managing director in 1968.
