= Robert Bruce (rugby union) =

Scotland international rugby union player

- Born: Robert Mitchell Bruce; 19 June 1922 Aberdeen, Scotland
- Died: 16 June 2001 (aged 78)

Rugby union career
- Position: Prop
Amateur team(s)
Years	Team	Apps	(Points)
-	Gordonians		
Provincial / State sides
Years	Team	Apps	(Points)
-	North of Scotland		
-	Scotland Probables		
International career
Years	Team	Apps	(Points)
1947-48	Scotland	4	(0)

Robert Bruce (19 June 1922 – 16 June 2001) was a Scotland international rugby union player.

== Rugby Union career ==
=== Amateur career ===
He played for Gordonians. He was the first Gordonians player to be capped for Scotland.

=== Provincial career ===
Bruce was capped for North of Scotland District.

He played for the combined North of Scotland District side (a defacto North and Midlands side) in their match against Australia in October 1947.

He turned out for the Scotland Probables side on 20 December 1947.

=== International career ===
He was capped 4 times for Scotland in the period 1947 to 1948.

=== Administrative career ===
He was the North of Scotland district secretary for many years.

== Banking career ==
He joined Aberdeen Savings Bank at the age of 18, and became manager of their Stornoway branch in 1952.

While in Stornoway he founded Stornoway RFC.
