= Syd Newman =

England international rugby union player

- Full name: Sydney Charles Newman
- Born: 27 July 1919 Pretoria, South Africa
- Died: 2 June 1990 (aged 70) Johannesburg, South Africa
- School: Christian Brothers College
- University: University of Oxford

Rugby union career
- Position: Fullback
International career
Years	Team	Apps	(Points)
1947–48	England	3	(3)

Sydney Charles Newman (27 July 1919 – 2 June 1990) was a South African-born England rugby union representative.

Born and raised in South Africa, Newman was a fullback, capped three times for England while in the country to study at the University of Oxford, where he was a rugby blue. He also played for Moseley.

Newman made his England debut in their 1947 Five Nations win over France at Twickenham. He started the 1948 season as England's fullback in the one-off Test against Australia and two weeks later gained his third cap in a Five Nations match against Wales. His first-minute penalty goal in the Wales match, a difficult shot from distance under heavy rain, was England's only score in a 3–3 draw that secured their only points of the campaign.

== See also ==
- List of England national rugby union players
