= Eric Davis (rugby union) =

- Born: Eric Hamilton Davis; 18 September 1917 Abbey Wood, Kent
- Died: 1 February 2001 (aged 83) Melbourne, Australia

Rugby union career
- Position: prop
International career
Years	Team	Apps	(Points)
1947–49	Wallabies	4	(0)

Eric Hamilton Davis (18 September 1917 – 2 February 2001) was a rugby union player who represented Australia. Davis, a prop, was born in Abbey Wood, Kent and claimed a total of 4 international rugby caps for Australia.
