= Mick Cremin =

- Born: John Francis Cremin; 14 May 1923 Sydney, Australia
- Died: 13 January 2011 (aged 87) Sydney, Australia
- School: Sydney Boys High School
- University: University of Sydney

Rugby union career
- Position: Fly-half
International career
Years	Team	Apps	(Points)
1946–1948	Australia	19	(0)

John Francis "Mick" Cremin (14 May 1923 – 13 January 2011) was an Australian rugby union player. Born in Sydney, he graduated from Sydney Boys High School in 1939 and later the University of Sydney. He played for Randwick and New South Wales before making his Test debut against New Zealand at Dunedin on 14 September 1946.

Cremin played as a fly-half in three Tests and 19 matches for Australia. He was renowned as a strategist and became one of the Wallabies' most influential players in the post-World War II period. He died in Sydney on 13 January 2011, aged 87.
