= David Swarbrick =

English rugby union player

David William Swarbrick (17 January 1927 – 20 April 2016) was an English rugby player, who gained 6 caps for England from 1947 to 1949. He was also in Debrett's.
