= Tommy Kemp =

England international rugby union player

- Born: Thomas Arthur Kemp; 12 August 1915 Bolton, Greater Manchester, England
- Died: 26 November 2004 (aged 89)
- School: Denstone College
- University: Oxford University

Rugby union career
- Position: Fly-half
Senior career
Years	Team	Apps	(Points)
–	Oxford University RFC		
–	Barbarian FC		
International career
Years	Team	Apps	(Points)
1937–48	England	5	(0)

Tommy Kemp (12 August 1915 – 26 November 2004) was a rugby union international who represented England from 1937 to 1948. He also captained his country.

== Early life ==
Tommy Kemp was born on 12 August 1915 in Bolton.

== Rugby union career ==
Kemp made his debut for England on 16 January 1937 at Twickenham when they played Wales. Of the five matches he played for his national side he was on the winning side on three occasions. He played his final match for England on 17 January 1948 at Twickenham when he again played Wales.

== Outside rugby ==
Kemp qualified as a doctor at St Mary's Hospital Medical School. During the Second World War he joined the Royal Army Medical Corps and served in the Middle East. He also worked at St Mary's Hospital and the now defunct Paddington General Hospital.

Kemp was survived by his wife Ruth (née Scott-Keat) and their son and daughter.
