= Nicholas Shehadie =

Australia international rugby union player & politician (1926–2018)

Sir Nicholas Shehadie AC OBE
- Shehadie in the 1940s

75th Lord Mayor of Sydney
- In office 24 September 1973 – 26 September 1975
- Deputy: Barrett Lewis; Leo Port
- Preceded by: David Griffin
- Succeeded by: Leo Port

Alderman of the City of Sydney
- In office 1 December 1962 – 13 November 1967
- Constituency: Northcott Ward
- In office 27 September 1969 – 18 September 1977
- Constituency: Macquarie Ward

2nd Chairman of the Special Broadcasting Service
- In office 10 July 1981 – 17 December 1999
- Preceded by: Grisha Sklovsky
- Succeeded by: Carla Zampatti

Personal details
- Born: Nicholas Michael Shehadie; 16 November 1926 Coogee, Sydney, Australia
- Died: 11 February 2018 (aged 91) Mosman, Sydney, Australia
- Resting place: Waverley Cemetery, Bronte, Sydney
- Party: Independent
- Spouse: Marie Bashir
- Education: Cleveland St Public School; Crown St Commercial School

Rugby union career
- Position: Front row/Second row
Senior career
Years	Team	Apps	(Points)
1942–1958	Randwick DRUFC	175	
Provincial / State sides
Years	Team	Apps	(Points)
1943–1957	New South Wales	37	
International career
Years	Team	Apps	(Points)
1947–1958	Australia	30	

Sir Nicholas Michael Shehadie (16 November 1926 – 11 February 2018) was a Lord Mayor of Sydney (1973–1975) and national representative rugby union captain, who made thirty career test appearances for Australia between 1947 and 1958. He was president of the Australia Rugby Union from 1980 to 1987; in that role he pushed for and succeeded in persuading the International Rugby Board to launch the Rugby World Cup. He is an inductee into both the Australian Rugby Union Hall of Fame and the IRB Hall of Fame.

== Early life ==
Nicholas Michael Shehadie (Arabic: السير نيكولاس مايكل شحادة) was born to a Lebanese Greek Orthodox family in the beachside Sydney suburb of Coogee. He was the third of five children born to Hannah (née Khouri) and Michael Shehaidie, who arrived in Sydney from Lebanon in 1923, two years before Nicholas was born. Nicholas grew up in Redfern, Sydney and attended the Cleveland St Public and later Crown St Commercial Schools.

== Rugby career ==
The young Shehadie embraced Sydney's sporting lifestyle and joined the Coogee Surf Club where many of the surfers were avid rugby players, Keith and Colin Windon among them. He joined the Randwick Rugby Club and was first picked as a replacement in first grade when he was still aged fifteen. He made his first representative appearance for New South Wales against a Combined Services side at age sixteen. In 1947 he appeared in a New South Wales XV against New Zealand and then made his debut for Australia in the final Test against those same touring All Blacks.

Shehadie was selected on the 1947–48 Wallaby tour, the fourth youngest of the 30-man squad. He dislocated his shoulder in the fourth tour match against Cardiff but recovered to make 24 tour appearances including the final two Tests against England and France. He finished the tour in the Wallabies side that met the Barbarians in their inaugural match against an international touring team.

Shehadie made representative appearances against the New Zealand Māori in 1949 and that year toured New Zealand in Trevor Allan's team which for the first time in history returned victorious with the Bledisloe Cup. He made further representative showings against the British and Irish Lions in 1950, the All Blacks in 1951 and Fiji in 1952.

Shehadie made his second tour of New Zealand in 1952 and then on the 1953 Wallaby tour of South Africa he was honoured with the Australian captaincy in eight tour matches and in one Test. He continued to represent at the highest level from 1954 to 1956 and then in 1957 he made history as the first Wallaby to repeat a tour of the British Isles and Europe. While he played in 24 matches of the trip including two Tests, the tour was a disappointment with the Wallabies losing all five Tests. Shehadie was signally honoured however when he became the first tourist to be asked to play for the Barbarians in the final tour match against his own team.

Altogether, Shehadie made 175 appearances for Randwick in a 16-year club career. He represented Australia on 114 occasions – the first player to reach the century mark. He played 30 Tests – a record at the time – 3 of them as captain.

== Business and public life ==
Shehadie worked in the 1950s selling fire doors and securities systems for Wormald Industries and later became a sales manager with an asphalt company. When his footballing days ended, he commenced a business supplying and fixing vinyl tiles used in hotel bars and in computer room installations requiring anti-static floors. The business was successful, being first to market with a product in high demand by the growing information technology departments of corporate Australia.

=== Lord Mayor of Sydney ===
Shehadie's career in public office commenced in 1962 when he stood as an alderman for the council elections of the City of Sydney. He ran on a ticket with the Civic Reform Association, a non-aligned ratepayers' association. He was elected and then served a second term from 1966.

When city council boundaries were changed in 1967, Shehadie's ward moved into the South Sydney precinct and he and his fellow councillors were dismissed overnight. In the next election of 1969, he stood again and was chosen as Deputy Lord Mayor of Sydney. He was instrumental in an administration that presided over the development of Martin Place including its beautification and closure to traffic. This leadership also pioneered a system enabling the transfer by sale of city building site ratios whereby owners of historic buildings would no longer be penalised because they weren't able to develop the building.

In 1973, Shehadie was elected as Lord Mayor of Sydney. He was in office at the time of the opening of the Sydney Opera House by Queen Elizabeth II on 20 October 1973. He officiated at visits by Charles, Prince of Wales in 1972 and by Anne, Princess Royal in 1974. He was in office during the Green Bans when the New South Wales Builders' Labourers Federation led a campaign to protect the built and natural environment of Sydney's Woolloomooloo area from excessive development.

In 1973, Shehadie stood for Liberal Party preselection for the seat of Parramatta with the support of future prime minister John Howard, losing by one vote to Philip Ruddock. The party head office favoured Shehadie, and this was the first "significant pre-selection" in which the favoured candidate did not win.

=== Service and patronage ===
Shehadie was appointed as Chairman of the Special Broadcasting Service (SBS) in 1981 and served that organisation until 1999. SBS is a government-funded Australian public broadcasting radio and television network, chartered to provide multilingual and multicultural radio and television services that reflect Australia's multicultural society.

Shehadie served as patron to The Infants' Home Child and Family Services during his wife's Marie Bashir tenure as Governor (2001–2014). He was an active patron, opening new childcare centres in 2013.

Shehadie was chairman of The Duke of Edinburgh's International Award – Australia from 1992 to 1994.

== Sports administration ==
=== Rugby administration ===
Shehadie was appointed chairman of the New South Wales Rugby Union in 1979, a position which gave him a seat on the Australian Rugby Union board, where he was immediately selected deputy president. In 1980, he became president of the ARU, a position held till 1987. He was instrumental in the schoolboy rule changes which outlawed forceful scrum engagements aimed to avoid neck injuries and make schoolboy rugby safer. He performed as tour manager on the 1981–82 Australia rugby union tour of Britain and Ireland.

Shehadie was first involved in discussions regarding a Rugby World Cup from 1983 when the ARU raised the matter with the International Rugby Football Board. Initial resistance came from the Home Nation unions with the push coming from Australia and New Zealand. After much international lobbying, a 1985 vote saw France, New Zealand and Australia all for it; Scotland and Ireland against it; with England and Wales both split. The vote was carried and Shehadie was appointed joint chairman on the inaugural Rugby World Cup committee with John Kendall-Carpenter of the IRB and Dick Littlejohn of the New Zealand Rugby Union. Shehadie retired after the inaugural 1987 Rugby World Cup and was made a life member of the ARU.

On 24 October 2011, at the IRB Awards ceremony in Auckland, Shehadie was inducted into the IRB Hall of Fame in recognition of his role in the creation of the Rugby World Cup.

=== Sydney Cricket Ground ===
Shehadie had been a member of the Sydney Cricket Ground for 29 years when in 1978 he was invited by the New South Wales Minister for Sport, Ken Booth, to become a Trustee. At the time he was patron of the Randwick Rugby Club and a committee member of the Sydney Turf Club. He served as Trustee of the SCG from 1978 to 2001 and was chairman from 1990 to 2001. His time on the trust saw the installation of lights at the Cricket Ground and the building of the Sydney Football Stadium where a stand was named in his honour. In his final year as chairman a Walk of Honour was opened, with thirty-three plaques honouring sporting champions who have performed at the SCG. Sir Nicholas Shehadie is one of the thirty-three.

== Family ==
Shehadie's grandfather, also named Nicholas Shehadie, was a priest in the Antioch Orthodox Church who migrated from Lebanon in 1910 and later became the head of that church in Australia and New Zealand. His father Michael remained in Lebanon due to the outbreak of World War I, won a scholarship to study chemistry at the University of Kiev and, in the 1920s, chose to migrate to Australia to join his father in Sydney's growing Lebanese community. Michael earned a living as a chemist and shopkeeper, and having been ordained in Russia took over as the pastoral head of the Antioch Church upon the death of Nicholas senior in 1934.

In February 1957, Nick married Marie Bashir (later Dame Marie), also of Lebanese background. She was the Governor of New South Wales from 2001 to 2014. They had three children and six grandchildren. Shehadie lived in Mosman with his wife from 1960 until his death.

== Funeral ==
Shehadie died aged 91 on 11 February 2018 and was granted a state funeral which was presided over by the Anglican Archbishop of Sydney, Glenn Davies, at St James' Church on 22 February 2018. His funeral was attended by one of the largest groupings of national dignitaries in recent New South Wales history which included: Governors-general Sir Peter Cosgrove, Dame Quentin Bryce and Michael Jeffery; New South Wales governors Dame Marie Bashir and David Hurley; former prime ministers Bob Hawke, Paul Keating and John Howard; current and former New South Wales premiers Barrie Unsworth, Nick Greiner, John Fahey, Morris Iemma, Kristina Keneally, Barry O'Farrell, Mike Baird and Gladys Berejiklian; Lord Mayor Clover Moore; police commissioners Andrew Scipione and Mick Fuller; Wallabies players and coaches Nick Farr-Jones, Michael Cheika, Alan Jones, Mark Ella and Glen Ella, and Olympian Dawn Fraser. Shehadie was buried privately at Waverley Cemetery in Bronte, Sydney, New South Wales.

== Honours ==
- 1 January 1971 Officer of the Order of the British Empire (OBE) for service to Local Government.
- 1 January 1976 Knight Bachelor for his service as Lord Mayor of Sydney.
- In 1985, he was inducted into the Sport Australia Hall of Fame.
- 11 June 1990 Companion of the Order of Australia (AC) for "service to the media, to sport and to community".
- 28 July 2000 Australian Sports Medal for his service as "Both President of Australian Rugby Union and Captain of Australian Rugby Team (1969–1973)".
- 1 January 2001 Centenary Medal for "service to the community".
- 17 May 2001 Knight of the Order of St John
- In 2006 he was honoured in the second set of inductees into the Australian Rugby Union Hall of Fame.
- On 24 October 2011, Shehadie was inducted into the IRB Hall of Fame.

Sporting positions
Preceded by John Solomon	Australian national rugby union captain 1953–1954	Succeeded by Alan Cameron
Civic offices
Vacant Title last held by Joseph Bradford	Deputy Lord Mayor of Sydney; 1969–1973	Succeeded by Barrett Lewis
Preceded by David Griffin	Lord Mayor of Sydney; 1973–1975	Succeeded by Leo Port
Media offices
Preceded by Grisha Sklovsky	Chairman of the Special Broadcasting Service; 1981–1999	Succeeded by Carla Zampatti
Government offices
Preceded by Pat Hills	Chairman of the Sydney Cricket and Sports Ground Trust; 1990–2001	Succeeded by Rodney Cavalier
