= Trevor Allan (rugby) =

Australian rugby player (1926–2007)

- Born: Trevor Allan; 26 September 1926 Bathurst, New South Wales
- Died: 27 January 2007 (aged 80)
- School: North Sydney Technical High School
- Occupation: Commentator

Rugby union career
- Position: Centre
Amateur team(s)
Years	Team	Apps	(Points)
1945–50	Gordon RFC		
Provincial / State sides
Years	Team	Apps	(Points)
1946–50	New South Wales	17	
International career
Years	Team	Apps	(Points)
1946–49	Australia	14	
- Rugby league career

Playing information
- Position: Centre
Club
Years	Team	Pld	T	G	FG	P
1950–54	Leigh	97				162
1956–58	North Sydney	11				14
	Total	108	0	0	0	176
Representative
Years	Team	Pld	T	G	FG	P
1951–1953	Other Nationalities	4				9
1952	British Empire	1				3

Coaching information
Club
Years	Team	Gms	W	D	L	W%
1957–1958	North Sydney

Trevor Allan OAM (26 September 1926 – 27 January 2007) was an Australian dual-code rugby international who captained Australia in rugby union before switching to rugby league with English club Leigh.

== Rugby union club career ==
A North Sydney rugby union junior, Allan was educated at North Sydney Technical High School. His senior club career was with the Gordon rugby club in Sydney where his father was a coach. Phil Tressider described him as a fine running centre with powerful acceleration once he got outside a rival. His forte was the muscle he would add to a back-line with his fierce tackling. He had strength beyond his years and slight physique. As a teenager he shared an ice-run with one of his brothers and he would haul a 28-pound block of ice on a hook in either hand sometimes climbing three or four flights of stairs to make the delivery.

== Rugby union representative career ==
After only a handful of senior games, he was selected for New South Wales aged just 19 and later that year for the 1946 tour of New Zealand, the Wallabies' first post-war tour. Allan's defence impressed against the experienced All Black backline.

In 1947, he was selected as vice-captain of the Wallaby side to tour Europe and North America. In the sixth game of the tour, in a minor match against London Counties, the captain Bill McLean broke his leg badly and was able to play no further part in the nine-month tour. Allan took over. This was a few days after his 21st birthday making him the second youngest Wallaby captain and the youngest ever touring captain. The Wallabies beat Scotland, Ireland and England but lost to Wales on penalties. They did not have a try scored against them in any of these Tests. Allan returned from the tour having proved both his exceptional leadership and playing capabilities.

In 1949, he led the Wallabies to New Zealand where they won the Bledisloe Cup for the first time in New Zealand and posted eleven wins from twelve games on tour. The Rugby Almanack of New Zealand that year named him one of the world's top 5 players.

He missed the Test against the British Lions in 1950 due to injury but coached the Australian side.

In all he played 17 matches for the New South Wales Waratahs in his rugby career, he played for Australia in 52 matches of which 14 were Tests. He was captain in 40 of those 52 national appearances, 10 of them Tests.

== Rugby league career ==
In late 1950, Allan signed with English Rugby Football League club Leigh. With the assistance of Australian former rugby league international Ray Stehr he signed a four-year contract with the club worth 5,000 pounds sterling. He made 97 appearances for Leigh in a four-year period, scoring 52 tries. He also represented in a star-studded Other Nationalities side during this time, making him a dual-code international. He returned to Australia in 1955 and played three seasons with the North Sydney Bears, the last two as captain-coach.

== Post-playing ==
After retiring he began a long and successful career with the Australian Broadcasting Commission as a commentator on league and union. He was the face and voice of the ABC's rugby union coverage throughout the 1960s and 1970s. He died early in 2007.

== Accolades and honours ==
On 10 June 1991, he was awarded the Order of Australia Medal and on 23 August 2000, he was awarded the Australian Sports Medal for services to rugby union. He was made a life member of the Sydney Cricket Ground and has been honored there with the installment of a bronze sculpture of his likeness, and a plaque in the Walk of Honour there commemorates his career.

His 1947 Wallaby tour teammate Sir Nicholas Shehadie described him as follows: I doubt that I ever laid eyes on a better defending centre who also excelled in attack. He performed many try-saving tackles, most memorably in our 1948 Test defeat of England at Twickenham. Few better leaders.

In 2007, the Trevor Allan Cup was created in his honour being a five-round north–south pool competition involving first grade teams from all twelve Sydney clubs, conducted in the second half of the Sydney domestic season after completion of the Shute Shield first grade competition.

In 2010, he was honoured in the sixth set of inductees into the Australian Rugby Union Hall of Fame.

He is one of six captains to lead his side to a test series win on New Zealand soil, along with Philip J. Nel (1937 Springboks), John Dawes (1971 British Lions), Andrew Slack (1986 Australia), Philippe Saint-André (1994 France) and Johnny Sexton (2022 Ireland).

== Sources ==
- Collection (1995) Gordon Bray presents The Spirit of Rugby, HarperCollins Publishers Sydney – (Essay specific to this article Phil Tressider's The Class of '47-48 1st published Sydney's Daily Telegraph 1987)
- Whiticker, Alan & Hudson, Glen (2006) The Encyclopedia of Rugby League Players, Gavin Allen Publishing, Sydney
- Howell, Max (2005) Born to Lead – Wallaby Test Captains, Celebrity Books, Auckland NZ
- Shehadie, Nicholas (2003) A Life Worth Living, Simon & Schuster Australia

Sporting positions
Preceded by Bruce Ryan; 1956	Coach North Sydney; 1957–1958	Succeeded by Ross McKinnon; 1959
Preceded by Phil Hardcastle	Captain Australia; 1947–1949	Succeeded by Nev Cottrell
