= Max Howell (educator) =

Australia international rugby union player & coach

- Born: 23 July 1927 Sydney, Australia
- Died: 3 February 2014 (aged 86) Brisbane, Australia
- School: Sydney Technical High School
- Occupation(s): Educator, University Professor

Rugby union career
- Position: Centre
International career
Years	Team	Apps	(Points)
1946–1948	Australia	5	

Maxwell Leo "Max" Howell AO (né Maxwell Leopold Howell. 23 July 1927 – 3 February 2014) was an Australian educator and rugby union player. He played 5 Tests and 27 non-Test games for Australia between 1946 and 1948. He went on to become a physical education teacher and Professor at the University of Queensland. In 2003, he was appointed an Officer of the Order of Australia "for service to education as a pioneer in the development of sports studies and sport science as academic disciplines".

After his career as player he went to North America. Aligned with his sporting exploits, he pursued undergraduate and graduate study in Australia and North America in physical education, educational psychology, exercise physiology, and sport history. He earned doctorate degrees from the University of California at Berkeley (Facilitation of motor learning by knowledge of performance analysis results Ed.D. 1954) and from the University of Stellenbosch, South Africa (An historical survey of the role of sport in society, with particular reference to Canada since 1700. PhD 1969) He was also awarded an honorary Doctor of Laws Degree from the University of Alberta, Canada. During his academic career, Howell held teaching and administrative posts at the University of British Columbia, the University of Alberta, San Diego State University, the University of Ottawa, and the University of Queensland.

At Alberta, Howell began the graduate program in sport history from which a number of scholars in sport history have graduated, he was dean of the College of Professional Studies at San Diego State University, and he was the foundation chair and first professor of human movement studies at the University of Queensland. He was renowned for his capacity to stimulate graduate students in the field of sport history and significantly influenced programs in Canada, America, and Australia.

He published articles and books on a range of topics that included physiotherapy, motor learning, exercise physiology, comparative physical education, sport in antiquity, Canadian sport history, the history of sport in Australia, and more recently he wrote about Australian history and produced some fictional works. He is the author of two autobiographical works: The Shepherd Was Sleeping: A True Story of Love and Tragedy and Tragedy and Laughter on the Road to Oblivion: Around the Final Bend.

He was the President of the North American Society for Sport History (NASSH), President of the Canadian Association for Health, Physical Education and Recreation, and President of the Canadian Association of Sport Sciences. NASSH honoured him with the annual Max and Reet Howell Memorial Address. He was married twice, the second, from 1974 until her death, to Reet Howell, PhD (née Reet Ann Nurmberg; 1945–1993), a scholar in comparative sports.

Among his many awards, honors, and recognitions, M. L. Howell was inducted into the National Academy of Kinesiology (formerly American Academy of Physical Education; American Academy of Kinesiology and Physical Education) as a Corresponding Fellow (Canada) in 1969. In 1977 while working in the United States he requested and was granted Active Fellow status and assigned the number 250 within the Academy. Upon moving to Australia he once again requested and was granted Corresponding Fellow (Australia) status in 1983. His wife, R. Howell, was also inducted as a Corresponding Fellow (Australia) in the Academy in 1991.
