= 1946 Australia rugby union tour of New Zealand =

Summary
P	W	D	L
Total
11	5	0	6
Test match
3	0	0	3
Opponent
P	W	D	L
New Zealand
2	0	0	2
NZ Maori
1	0	0	1

The 1946 Australia rugby union tour of New Zealand was a series of rugby union games undertaken by the Australia team in New Zealand against invitational and national teams of New Zealand. It was the first rugby union international tour after the Second World War.

New Zealand won all three test matches to retain the Bledisloe Cup

== Tour match ==
Scores and results list Australia's points tally first.

Opposing Team	For	Against	Date	Venue	Status
North Auckland	19	32	21 August 1946	Okara Park, Whangārei	Tour match
Taranaki / King Country	9	8	24 August 1946	Pukekura Park, New Plymouth	Tour match
Wanganui / Manawatu	17	15	28 August 1946	Cooks Gardens, Wanganui	Tour match
Hawke's Bay / Poverty Bay	19	11	31 August 1946	McLean Park, Napier	Tour match
Seddon Shield Districts	15	12	4 September 1946	Victoria Square, Westport	Tour match
Canterbury	11	20	7 September 1946	Lancaster Park, Christchurch	Tour match
New Zealand	8	31	14 September 1946	Carisbrook, Dunedin	Test match
Southland	6	8	18 September 1946	Rugby Park, Invercargill	Tour match
Wellington	16	15	21 September 1946	Athletic Park, Wellington	Tour match
New Zealand Maori	0	20	25 September 1946	Rugby Park, Hamilton	Test match
New Zealand	10	14	28 September 1946	Eden Park, Auckland	Test match

== Sources ==
- Vivian Jenkins, ed. (1979). Rothmans Rugby Yearbook 1979–80. Rothmans Publications Ltd. ISBN 0-354-09087-9.
