= List of New South Wales Waratahs players =

This is a list of rugby union footballers who have played for the New South Wales Waratahs since 1882.

The Waratahs were a foundation team in the 1996 Super 12 season.

== Player list ==
=== Super Rugby players ===
No.	Name	Caps	Tries	C	P	DG	Points	Debut	Last
1	Mark Bell	16						01/03/1996	17/05/1997
2	Andrew Blades	34	1				5	01/03/1996	15/05/1999
3	Scott Bowen	22	1				5	01/03/1996	05/04/1998
4	Matthew Burke	79	25	160	173		964	01/03/1996	08/05/2004
5	David Campese	22	6				30	01/03/1996	21/03/1998
6	Anthony Ekert	4	1				5	01/03/1996	01/05/1996
7	Tim Gavin	19	2				10	01/03/1996	17/05/1997
8	Mark Hartill	10						01/03/1996	26/04/1997
9	Jason Madz	18	5				25	01/03/1996	17/05/1997
10	Daniel Manu	28	3				15	01/03/1996	01/04/2000
11	Alistair Murdoch	20	13				65	01/03/1996	17/05/1997
12	Kevin O'Kane	7	1				5	01/03/1996	28/04/1996
13	Steve Talbot	22						01/03/1996	18/05/2002
14	Richard Tombs	18	2				10	01/03/1996	26/04/1997
15	Warwick Waugh	10	2				10	01/03/1996	10/05/1996
16	John Welborn	47	5				25	01/03/1996	12/05/2000
17	Tim Kelaher	5	1				5	09/03/1996	10/05/1996
18	Sam Payne	51	9	5			55	09/03/1996	12/05/2001
19	Richard Harry	43	3				15	16/03/1996	12/05/2000
20	Viliami Ofahengaue	28	4				20	16/03/1996	15/05/1999
21	Sam Domoni	19						24/03/1996	13/04/1998
22	Matt Mostyn	2						29/03/1996	02/04/1996
23	Tim Wallace	3	1				5	02/04/1996	28/04/1996
24	Matt Dixon	5	1				5	14/04/1996	17/05/1997
25	Michael Brial	33	7				35	21/04/1996	05/05/2000
26	Andrew Heath	8						01/05/1996	17/05/1997
27	Graeme Bond	16	2				10	08/03/1997	15/05/1998
28	Fili Finau	15	2				10	08/03/1997	27/04/2001
29	Mark Giacheri	1						08/03/1997	08/03/1997
30	Phil Kearns	27	2				10	08/03/1997	15/05/1999
31	Chris Latham	10						08/03/1997	09/05/1997
32	Adam Leach	1						08/03/1997	08/03/1997
33	Stuart Pinkerton	54	6				30	14/03/1997	12/05/2001
34	Nathan Spooner	3						14/03/1997	26/04/1997
35	Chris Whitaker	107	11		1		58	14/03/1997	19/05/2006
36	Cameron Blades	38						06/04/1997	12/05/2001
37	Matt Tink	2						12/04/1997	19/04/1997
38	Simon Kerr	2						02/05/1997	09/05/1997
39	Christian Warner	33	5	3	4		43	02/05/1997	31/03/2001
40	Tom Bowman	53	4				20	01/03/1998	10/05/2003
41	Matthew Dowling	30	12	1	9		89	01/03/1998	12/05/2001
42	Nathan Grey	84	19			1	98	01/03/1998	28/05/2005
43	Jason Jones-Hughes	21	3				15	01/03/1998	15/05/1999
44	Sikeli Quaqua	1						01/03/1998	01/03/1998
45	Tiaan Strauss	33	4				20	01/03/1998	12/05/2000
46	Semi Taupeaafe	10	5				25	01/03/1998	09/05/1998
47	Timote Tavalea	10						01/03/1998	03/04/1999
48	Jon Hart	6						06/03/1998	15/05/1999
49	Manny Edmonds	44	5	25	31	1	171	13/03/1998	18/05/2002
50	Scott Staniforth	61	22				110	28/03/1998	08/05/2004
51	Senirusi Rauqe	1						05/04/1998	05/04/1998
52	Travis Hall	1						13/04/1998	13/04/1998
53	Jason Little	13	2				10	27/02/1999	12/05/2000
54	Duncan McRae	30	11		1	1	61	27/02/1999	10/05/2003
55	Darren Junee	9						06/03/1999	26/02/2000
56	Mark Crick	20						20/03/1999	12/05/2001
57	Keith Gleeson	7						26/03/1999	12/05/2001
58	Fletcher Dyson	1						03/04/1999	03/04/1999
59	Marc Stcherbina	26	9				45	01/05/1999	18/05/2002
60	Peter Besseling	15						26/02/2000	12/05/2001
61	Brendan Cannon	69	2				10	26/02/2000	28/05/2005
62	David Lyons	100	7				35	26/02/2000	17/05/2008
63	Rod Moore	39						26/02/2000	18/04/2003
64	Phil Waugh	132	11				55	26/02/2000	24/06/2011
65	Al Baxter	122	1				5	04/03/2000	18/06/2011
66	Jason Reilly	6						01/04/2000	12/05/2000
67	Dominic Byrne	3						15/04/2000	05/05/2000
68	Matt Dunning	89	2			1	13	24/02/2001	31/05/2008
69	Drew Hickey	5						24/02/2001	24/03/2001
70	Luke Inman	13	5				25	24/02/2001	29/03/2002
71	Jono West	31	2				10	24/02/2001	10/05/2003
72	Brendan Williams	8	1				5	24/02/2001	13/04/2001
73	Sam Harris	28	4				20	17/03/2001	21/03/2008
74	Adam Magro	1						24/03/2001	24/03/2001
75	Tui Talaia	3						24/03/2001	27/04/2001
76	Mark Gerrard	1						27/04/2001	27/04/2001
77	Patricio Noriega	13	1				5	23/02/2002	10/05/2003
78	Tim Rapp	3						23/02/2002	16/03/2002
79	Mat Rogers	40	17	30	19		202	23/02/2002	19/05/2006
80	Jone Tawake	10	2				10	23/02/2002	11/04/2003
81	Des Tuiavi'i	12	1				5	23/02/2002	18/05/2002
82	Francis Cullimore	6	1				5	09/03/2002	18/05/2002
83	Huia Edmonds	8						09/03/2002	18/05/2002
84	Van Humphries	21	2				10	09/03/2002	10/05/2003
85	Simon Kasprowicz	21	2				10	09/03/2002	08/05/2004
86	Tim Clark	4						23/03/2002	18/05/2002
87	Matt Bowman	1						18/05/2002	18/05/2002
88	Rocky Elsom	71	10				50	21/02/2003	19/05/2012
89	Adam Freier	82	12				60	21/02/2003	24/04/2010
90	Omar Hassanein	1						21/02/2003	21/02/2003
91	Ryan McGoldrick	2						21/02/2003	21/03/2003
92	Paul Sheedy	4	1				5	21/02/2003	18/04/2003
93	Milton Thaiday	13	4				20	21/02/2003	08/05/2004
94	Lote Tuqiri	89	29		1		148	21/02/2003	15/05/2009
95	Morgan Turinui	58	20				100	21/02/2003	14/04/2007
96	Shaun Berne	38	6	3	6	1	57	08/03/2003	13/05/2006
97	Nathan Blacklock	5	2				10	08/03/2003	05/04/2003
98	Lei Tomiki	5						05/04/2003	04/04/2004
99	Elia Tuqiri	4						18/04/2003	05/03/2004
100	Tim Donnelly	16	2	2	3		23	21/02/2004	18/02/2006
101	Justin Harrison	21						21/02/2004	28/05/2005
102	Stephen Hoiles	62	6				30	21/02/2004	27/06/2015
103	Ben Jacobs	35	6				30	21/02/2004	05/04/2008
104	Cameron Shepherd	20	6				30	21/02/2004	28/05/2005
105	Dan Vickerman	53						21/02/2004	18/06/2011
106	Gareth Hardy	16	1				5	28/02/2004	28/05/2005
107	Aaron Broughton-Rouse	7						05/03/2004	09/02/2007
108	Alister Campbell	4						05/03/2004	01/05/2004
109	Peter Hewat	40	17	66	101		520	25/02/2005	05/05/2007
110	Al Kanaar	26	1				5	25/02/2005	19/05/2006
111	Lachlan MacKay	10	2				10	25/02/2005	28/05/2005
112	Winston Mafi	3						25/02/2005	02/04/2005
113	Chris O'Young	8						25/02/2005	28/05/2005
114	Wycliff Palu	134	13				65	25/02/2005	15/07/2016
115	Will Caldwell	61	2				10	11/02/2006	24/04/2010
116	Sam Norton-Knight	49	8				40	11/02/2006	15/05/2009
117	Tatafu Polota-Nau	143	13				65	11/02/2006	15/03/2019
118	Benn Robinson	148	7				35	11/02/2006	16/04/2016
119	Wendell Sailor	8	4				20	11/02/2006	06/05/2006
120	Daniel Halangahu	74	9	30	37		216	18/02/2006	02/06/2012
121	Brett Sheehan	47	1				5	18/02/2006	15/05/2009
122	Troy Takiari	2						25/02/2006	04/03/2006
123	Kurtley Beale	147	28	66	67	3	482	02/02/2007	15/03/2020
124	Tim Davidson	8						02/02/2007	05/05/2007
125	Ben Hand	10						02/02/2007	14/04/2007
126	Dean Mumm	116	12				60	02/02/2007	15/07/2017
127	Josh Valentine	13	1				5	02/02/2007	28/03/2008
128	Beau Robinson	21	1				5	09/02/2007	31/05/2008
129	Jeremy Tilse	61						17/02/2007	15/07/2016
130	Al Manning	2						09/03/2007	24/05/2008
131	Lachie Turner	71	25				125	17/03/2007	15/03/2013
132	Dave Dennis	107	10				50	31/03/2007	15/07/2016
133	Josh Holmes	19	5				25	08/04/2007	24/06/2011
134	Chris Siale	3						21/04/2007	05/05/2007
135	Nathan Sievert	1						21/04/2007	21/04/2007
136	Luke Burgess	56	4				20	16/02/2008	18/06/2011
137	Tom Carter	76	14				70	16/02/2008	09/06/2013
138	Alfie Mafi	9						16/02/2008	26/04/2008
139	Timana Tahu	20	3				15	16/02/2008	15/05/2009
140	Sekope Kepu	141	5				25	01/03/2008	08/06/2019
141	Dan Palmer	12						01/03/2008	22/05/2010
142	Rob Horne	115	27				135	07/03/2008	15/07/2017
143	Matthew Carraro	51	7				35	12/04/2008	15/07/2016
144	Scott Fava	2						14/02/2009	20/02/2009
145	Ben Mowen	41	3				15	14/02/2009	03/06/2011
146	Chris Thomson	11						14/02/2009	14/05/2010
147	Luke Doherty	8						13/03/2009	15/05/2009
148	Damien Fitzpatrick	72	5				25	21/03/2009	15/03/2020
149	Peter Playford	3	2				10	01/05/2009	15/05/2009
150	Sosene Anesi	20	3				15	13/02/2010	24/06/2011
151	Berrick Barnes	43	4	30	35	3	194	13/02/2010	13/07/2013
152	Kane Douglas	76	2				10	13/02/2010	02/08/2014
153	Cameron Jowitt	1						13/02/2010	13/02/2010
154	Drew Mitchell	39	17				85	13/02/2010	09/06/2013
155	Rory Sidey	4	1				5	13/02/2010	22/05/2010
156	Hendrik Roodt	1						20/02/2010	20/02/2010
157	Chris Alcock	25	1				5	03/04/2010	14/07/2012
158	Lachlan McCaffrey	1						03/04/2010	03/04/2010
159	Pat McCutcheon	36	1				5	30/04/2010	30/05/2015
160	Ryan Cross	15	4				20	18/02/2011	24/06/2011
161	Brendan McKibbin	71	3	36	52		243	18/02/2011	27/06/2015
162	Sitaleki Timani	42	4				20	18/02/2011	13/07/2013
163	Afa Pakalani	14	5				25	04/03/2011	19/05/2012
164	John Ulugia	40	2				10	19/03/2011	13/07/2013
165	Pat O'Connor	8						01/04/2011	24/06/2011
166	Paddy Ryan	111	3				15	01/04/2011	31/05/2024
167	Tom Kingston	29	7				35	16/04/2011	13/07/2013
168	Hugh Perrett	6						21/05/2011	24/06/2011
169	Ben Batger	1						28/05/2011	28/05/2011
170	Bernard Foley	119	29	244	152		1089	24/06/2011	08/06/2019
171	Elvis Taione	1						24/06/2011	24/06/2011
172	Adam Ashley-Cooper	76	16			1	83	25/02/2012	14/06/2019
173	Brackin Karauria-Henry	2						25/02/2012	02/03/2012
174	Sarel Pretorius	14	2				10	25/02/2012	02/06/2012
175	Lopeti Timani	19						25/02/2012	09/06/2013
176	Jono Jenkins	10						02/03/2012	14/07/2012
177	Nathan Trist	1						02/03/2012	02/03/2012
178	Tevita Metuisela	2						10/03/2012	17/03/2012
179	Peter Betham	33	11				55	29/04/2012	27/06/2015
180	Joshua Mann-Rea	1						19/05/2012	19/05/2012
181	Richard Stanford	2						26/05/2012	02/06/2012
182	Grayson Hart	2						07/07/2012	14/07/2012
183	Mitchell Chapman	35						23/02/2013	27/06/2015
184	Israel Folau	96	60				300	23/02/2013	06/04/2019
185	Michael Hooper	141	26				130	23/02/2013	09/06/2023
186	Matt Lucas	33	2	2			14	23/02/2013	08/07/2017
187	Ben Volavola	8	2				10	23/02/2013	13/07/2013
188	Greg Peterson	1						01/03/2013	01/03/2013
189	Luke Holmes	6						09/03/2013	13/07/2013
190	Jed Holloway	100	9				45	31/03/2013	31/05/2024
191	Cam Crawford	12	8				40	19/04/2013	12/07/2014
192	Will Skelton	64	3				15	11/05/2013	03/06/2017
193	Richard Aho	1						09/06/2013	09/06/2013
194	Ollie Atkins	1	1				5	09/06/2013	09/06/2013
195	Adam Coleman	1						09/06/2013	09/06/2013
196	AJ Gilbert	1						09/06/2013	09/06/2013
197	Terrence Hepetema	1						09/06/2013	09/06/2013
198	Liam Winton	1						09/06/2013	09/06/2013
199	Alofa Alofa	15	4				20	23/02/2014	02/08/2014
200	Tolu Latu	67	3				15	23/02/2014	09/06/2023
201	Nick Phipps	87	18				90	23/02/2014	14/06/2019
202	Jacques Potgieter	33	3				15	23/02/2014	27/06/2015
203	Jono Lance	13	1				5	29/03/2014	27/06/2015
204	Tala Gray	2						12/04/2014	09/05/2015
205	Taqele Naiyaravoro	50	30				150	18/05/2014	28/07/2018
206	Hugh Roach	39	1				5	18/05/2014	12/05/2018
207	Michael Alaalatoa	1						12/07/2014	12/07/2014
208	Sam Lousi	18						20/02/2015	15/07/2016
209	Jack Dempsey	52	8				40	16/05/2015	12/06/2021
210	Dave Porecki	44	11				55	06/06/2015	31/05/2025
211	Zac Guildford	7	1				5	27/02/2016	27/05/2016
212	Bryce Hegarty	30	5	1	1		30	27/02/2016	28/07/2018
213	David Horwitz	27	2	1			12	27/02/2016	15/07/2017
216	Angus Taʻavao	23	3				15	27/02/2016	15/07/2017
217	Tom Robertson	62	3				15	18/03/2016	29/08/2020
218	Reece Robinson	20	6	9	6		66	18/03/2016	06/05/2017
219	James Hilterbrand	1						03/04/2016	03/04/2016
220	Andrew Kellaway	42	8				40	03/04/2016	30/05/2026
221	Ned Hanigan	69	11				55	07/05/2016	25/05/2024
222	Jim Stewart	1						15/07/2016	15/07/2016
223	Dave Lolohea	8						25/02/2017	15/07/2017
224	David McDuling	15	1				5	25/02/2017	15/07/2017
225	Irae Simone	10						25/02/2017	27/05/2017
226	Senio Toleafoa	3						25/02/2017	11/03/2017
227	Michael Wells	44	5				25	25/02/2017	14/06/2019
228	Jake Gordon	120	33				165	04/03/2017	30/05/2026
229	Maclean Jones	1						04/03/2017	04/03/2017
230	Cam Clark	37	7				35	11/03/2017	14/02/2020
231	Mack Mason	6	1	3	1		14	02/04/2017	14/06/2019
232	Ryan McCauley	9						15/07/2017	06/03/2020
233	Lalakai Foketi	85	9				45	24/02/2018	24/05/2025
234	Harry Johnson-Holmes	91	11				55	24/02/2018	11/05/2024
235	Alex Newsome	71	18				90	24/02/2018	04/06/2022
236	Nick Palmer	4	1				5	24/02/2018	20/04/2018
237	Curtis Rona	31	13				65	24/02/2018	14/06/2019
238	Rob Simmons	43	3				15	24/02/2018	29/08/2020
239	Tom Staniforth	41	2				10	24/02/2018	29/08/2020
240	Shambeckler Vui	5						24/02/2018	14/06/2019
241	Will Miller	29	4				20	03/03/2018	14/06/2019
242	Mitch Short	15	2				10	03/03/2018	22/08/2020
243	Kalivati Tawake	2						03/03/2018	10/03/2018
244	Michael Snowden	1						18/03/2018	18/03/2018
245	Brad Wilkin	6	1				5	26/05/2018	28/07/2018
246	Karmichael Hunt	23						16/02/2019	14/08/2020
247	Rory O'Connor	12						16/02/2019	15/03/2020
248	Lachlan Swinton	56	6				30	16/02/2019	31/05/2024
249	Chris Talakai	19						16/02/2019	12/06/2021
250	Andrew Tuala	9						23/03/2019	12/06/2021
251	Hugh Sinclair	66	2				10	04/05/2019	31/05/2025
252	Tautalatasi Tasi	1						14/06/2019	14/06/2019
253	Robbie Abel	13						01/02/2020	12/06/2021
254	Angus Bell	55	6				30	01/02/2020	31/05/2025
255	Tetera Faulkner	49	1				5	01/02/2020	09/06/2023
256	Will Harrison	38	4	57	44	1	269	01/02/2020	18/05/2024
257	Jack Maddocks	26	9				45	01/02/2020	05/06/2021
258	Mark Nawaqanitawase	58	23				115	01/02/2020	31/05/2024
259	Carlo Tizzano	18	1				5	01/02/2020	26/03/2022
260	Tepai Moeroa	7						08/02/2020	14/05/2021
261	James Ramm	21	3				15	28/02/2020	30/04/2022
262	Siosifa Lisala	1						06/03/2020	06/03/2020
263	Michael McDonald	6						06/03/2020	22/05/2026
264	Pat Tafa	2						06/03/2020	15/03/2020
265	Will Harris	41	9				45	03/07/2020	27/05/2023
266	Tom Horton	26	3				15	03/07/2020	04/06/2022
267	Tiaan Tauakipulu	4						03/07/2020	13/05/2023
268	Joey Walton	57	5				25	03/07/2020	30/05/2026
269	Ben Donaldson	37	1	45	21	1	161	11/07/2020	09/06/2023
270	Joe Cotton	5						24/07/2020	29/05/2021
271	Nick Malouf	1						22/08/2020	22/08/2020
272	Sam Caird	10						19/02/2021	12/06/2021
273	Tane Edmed	52	3	68	32		247	19/02/2021	31/05/2025
274	Jack Grant	38	1				5	19/02/2021	31/05/2025
275	Izaia Perese	46	8				40	19/02/2021	31/05/2024
276	Alefosio Tatola	3						19/02/2021	05/03/2021
277	Jack Whetton	7						19/02/2021	12/06/2021
278	Jeremy Williams	16	1				5	19/02/2021	04/06/2022
279	Triston Reilly	40	10				50	27/02/2021	30/05/2026
280	Henry Robertson	6						27/02/2021	13/03/2022
281	Darcy Breen	8						19/03/2021	05/06/2021
282	Sam Wykes	2						19/03/2021	27/03/2021
283	Max Douglas	9						27/03/2021	14/05/2022
284	Charlie Gamble	67	6				30	02/04/2021	22/05/2026
285	Michael Wood	1						02/04/2021	02/04/2021
286	James Turner	3						22/05/2021	25/02/2022
287	Vunipola Fifita	2						05/06/2021	12/06/2021
288	Rahboni Warren-Vosayaco	9	1				5	05/06/2021	28/05/2022
289	Pek Cowan	1						12/06/2021	12/06/2021
290	Geoff Cridge	11						18/02/2022	22/05/2022
291	Dylan Pietsch	38	14				70	18/02/2022	31/05/2024
292	Jamie Roberts	11						18/02/2022	04/06/2022
293	Langi Gleeson	45	12				60	25/02/2022	31/05/2025
294	Ruan Smith	7						25/02/2022	28/05/2022
295	Tevita Funa	1						05/03/2022	05/03/2022
296	Archer Holz	15						13/03/2022	03/06/2023
297	Mahe Vailanu	33	5				25	13/03/2022	31/05/2025
298	Teddy Wilson	37	7				35	26/03/2022	30/05/2026
299	Ed Craig	1						30/04/2022	30/04/2022
300	Harrison Goddard	8						24/02/2023	09/06/2023
301	Max Jorgensen	39	16				80	24/02/2023	30/05/2026
302	Tom Lambert	30	1				5	24/02/2023	01/05/2026
303	Nemani Nadolo	4	1				5	24/02/2023	24/03/2023
304	Taleni Seu	13	2				10	24/02/2023	09/06/2023
305	Daniel Botha	34						04/03/2023	30/05/2026
306	Ben Dowling	4						04/03/2023	22/04/2023
307	Sateki Latu	1						17/03/2023	17/03/2023
308	Mosese Tuipulotu	5						17/03/2023	02/03/2024
309	Zac Von Appen	3						24/03/2023	22/04/2023
310	Harry Wilson	13	1				5	24/03/2023	11/05/2024
311	Hunter Ward	4						01/04/2023	11/05/2024
312	Jack Bowen	17	1	12	5		44	22/04/2023	30/05/2026
313	Michael Icely	1						22/04/2023	22/04/2023
314	Nephi Leatigaga	8	1				5	22/04/2023	09/06/2023
315	Ola Tauelangi	1						13/05/2023	13/05/2023
316	Miles Amatosero	38	1				5	24/02/2024	30/05/2026
317	Theo Fourie	2						24/02/2024	06/04/2024
318	Fergus Lee-Warner	16						24/02/2024	31/05/2025
319	Hayden Thompson-Stringer	9						24/02/2024	03/05/2024
320	Sam Thomson	1						24/02/2024	24/02/2024
321	Julian Heaven	13	3				15	02/03/2024	19/04/2025
322	Tom Ross	8						08/03/2024	31/05/2024
323	Jay Fonokalafi	7	2				10	16/03/2024	31/05/2024
324	Jack Barrett	7						29/03/2024	30/05/2026
325	Sione Misiloi	2						29/03/2024	06/04/2024
326	Lewis Ponini	7						12/04/2024	31/05/2024
327	Brad Amituanai	5						26/04/2024	31/05/2024
328	Vuate Karawalevu	2	1					03/05/2024	25/05/2024
329	Pone Fa'amausili	1						11/05/2024	11/05/2024
330	George Thornton	2						11/05/2024	18/05/2024
331	Ben Sugars	4						11/05/2024	31/05/2024
332	Enrique Pieretto	1						18/05/2024	18/05/2024
333	Harry Lloyd	1						25/05/2024	25/05/2024
334	Michael Scott	1						25/05/2024	25/05/2024
335	Rob Leota	11	3				15	14/02/2025	16/05/2025
336	Joseph-Aukuso Sua'ali'i	12	2				10	14/02/2025	30/05/2026
337	Taniela Tupou	13	1				5	14/02/2025	31/05/2025
338	Siosifa Amone	14	2				10	14/02/2025	01/05/2026
339	Ben Grant	17						14/02/2025	30/05/2026
340	Darby Lancaster	8	4				20	14/02/2025	31/05/2025
341	Jamie Adamson	21	1				5	14/02/2025	30/05/2026
342	Henry O'Donnell	12	1				5	28/02/2025	31/05/2025
343	Isaac Aedo Kailea	18	3				15	28/02/2025	30/05/2026
344	Lawson Creighton	22	2	22	2		60	08/03/2025	22/05/2026
345	Leafi Talataina	13						08/03/2025	09/05/2026
346	Felix Kalapu	6	1				5	08/03/2025	09/05/2025
347	Archie Saunders	1	1				5	28/03/2025	28/03/2025
348	Ethan Dobbins	14						28/03/2025	09/05/2026
349	Clem Halaholo	13	1				15	13/02/2026	30/05/2026
350	Jimmy Hendren	3						13/02/2026	14/03/2026
351	Matt Philip	13						13/02/2026	30/05/2026
352	Harry Potter	8	3				15	13/02/2026	30/05/2026
353	Pete Samu	12	1				5	13/02/2026	30/05/2026
354	Angus Blyth	11	1				5	13/02/2026	09/05/2026
355	Folau Fainga'a	8	2				10	13/02/2026	09/05/2026
356	Jack Debreczeni	14	1				5	13/02/2026	30/05/2026
357	Ioane Moananu	8	6				30	20/02/2026	30/05/2026
358	George Poolman	4						06/03/2026	16/05/2026
359	Sid Harvey	11	6	22	8		98	06/03/2026	22/05/2026
360	Angus Scott-Young	9	1				5	21/03/2026	30/05/2026
361	Apolosi Ranawai	5	3				15	01/05/2026	30/05/2026
362	Oniti Finau	3						16/05/2026	30/05/2026

=== Post-1996 caps (non Super Rugby) ===
- John Adams
- Pelea Afu
- David Alo
- Andrew Apps
- Will Brame
- James Bullock
- James Campbell
- Ed Carter
- Michael Cheika
- Michael Choromanski
- Josh Cullen
- Damien Cummins
- Wayne de Jonge
- Steve Devine
- Paul Dineen
- Ben Dunn
- Clint Eadie
- Tom Egan
- Ofa Faingaʻanuku
- Scott Fardy
- Allan Gilber
- Duncan Gillies
- Lee Green
- Nick Gregorski
- Dwayne Haare
- Brad Harrison
- Nick Harvey
- Dave Haydon
- Jarrod Heaney
- Michael Hercus
- James Hilgendorf
- Matt Hodgson
- Mark Howell
- Jonnie Hoy
- Will Hunt
- Matt Isaac
- Ed Jenkins
- Luke Johnson
- Lloyd Jones
- Wise Kativerata
- Dan Kelly
- James Lakepa
- Alisi Leao
- Arthur Little
- Shawn Mackay
- Chris Malone
- Pat McCabe
- James McCormack
- Tim McGann
- Matt Miller
- Peter Miller
- Luke Milton
- Jackson Mullane
- Geoff Mutton Jr.
- Meli Nakauta
- Patrick Phibbs
- Cameron Pither
- Semi Qativi
- Nick Reily
- Dave Rimmer
- Kingsley Seale
- Jon Shelley
- Matt Skillecorn
- Chris Sproats
- Nigel Staniforth
- Sam Talakai
- Rex Tapuai
- Cameron Treloar
- Phil Tyler
- Adam Walsh
- Nigel Waugh
- Laurie Weeks
- Josh Weeks
- Andrew Willett
- Jim Williams
- Dirk Williams
- Hugh Willoughby
- Marty Wilson
- Tim Wright

=== Capped players (1882–1995) ===
Name	Caps	Tries	Con	PG	DG	GFM	Points	First Yr	Last Yr
George Addison	7							1882	
Maurice Barlow	1							1882	
Zachary Barry	7							1882	
Harold Baylis	18	1	9				29	1882	1888
William Bennett	2							1882	
Jim Brodie	4							1882	1883
Frank Butler	1							1882	
Ewen Cameron	12	8	3		1		29	1882	1888
Herbert Clements	8	2					4	1882	1886
Henry Creer	3		1				3	1882	1884
Frederick Fligg	1							1882	
Henry Fligg	14	8					16	1882	1885
William Flynn	10	2	1		2		15	1882	1885
George Graham	12	1					2	1882	1885
C. Hawkins	8	2					4	1882	1884
Roland Hill	8							1882	1883
Michael Howard	7							1882	
Charles Jennings	5							1882	
Charles Lindeman	1							1882	
Bill Mann	7							1882	
Archibald McClatchie	6							1882	
A. G. McLean	1		1				3	1882	
James McManamey	1							1882	
Ernest Pell	1				1		4	1882	
Arthur Phillips	1							1882	
Ted Raper	11	11	2		1		32	1882	1883
Charles Readford	2							1882	
George Richmond	4							1882	
Charles Tange	11	4					8	1882	1888
Bob Thallon	10	2	4				16	1882	1883
George Walker	25	2					4	1882	1886
Stuart Belcher	4	1					2	1883	1884
Charles Cameron	6				1		4	1883	1886
Sam Chapman	5	1					2	1883	1884
Harry Ford	5							1883	1885
N. Hall	2							1883	
Horace Harpin	2							1883	
Noel Hill	1							1883	
Ernest Jarvis	1							1883	
Arthur Logan	1							1883	
Les Wade	4							1883	1888
Francis Baylis	4							1884	
Percy Chapman	5							1884	1887
John Cleeve	1							1884	
Sydney Deane	4	1					2	1884	
Allan Ford	3							1884	1885
Herb Lee	7							1884	1890
Leo Neill	17	4					8	1884	1890
James O'Donnell	7		3				9	1884	1888
Henry Osborne	3	1	2				8	1884	
James Oxley	3							1884	
Arthur Pearson	11							1884	1886
Reg Pell	2							1884	
Jack Shaw	22	1					3	1884	1889
Ben Sweetland	3							1884	
Henry Tange	2							1884	
James Vaughan	1							1884	
Tom Walters	5							1884	
John Wood	4	2					4	1884	1886
Fred Yeomans	1							1884	
Fred Cheeseman	1							1885	
Joseph Doyle	2							1885	
Fred Firth	1							1885	
William Lloyd	2							1885	
Arthur Radcliffe	2							1885	
Charles Robberds	3							1885	1886
George Sedgwick	1							1885	
B. Smith	2							1885	
Stewart Tiley	3							1885	1888
Robert Warren	11							1885	1886
Percy Allan	8							1886	
James Austin	8	1					2	1886	1888
Fred Baylis	2							1886	1889
Fred Belbridge	28	1					2	1886	1892
Dick Blaxland	10	1					2	1886	
Colin Caird	16							1886	1888
Tom Carr	13							1886	
Percy Colquhoun	33	3	3		6	1	42	1886	1896
Arthur Hale	8	6					12	1886	1889
E. Hungerford	5	2					4	1886	1889
John de Lauret	8							1886	
George McArthur	12	2			1		8	1886	
Herbert Read	15	2					5	1886	1895
Marcus Shortus	10							1886	
Percy Small	7							1886	
Fred Weaver	10							1886	
Alexander Wiseheart	9							1886	
Henry Woolnough	6							1886	
Syd Fallick	3							1887	1888
J. F. Fitzgerald	4	1					3	1887	1889
Fred Hillyar	5							1887	1889
Hedley Hungerford	2							1887	
Ken Jacob	2							1887	
Billy Norton	2							1887	
Tom Perry	3	1					2	1887	1888
William Smairl	2							1887	
James Wade	2							1887	
Dave Walker	12	2					6	1887	1891
George Wiburd	16	2					6	1887	1894
George Barbour	1							1888	
Bill Belbridge	11	1					3	1888	1890
Henry Braddon	6	1	3		1		13	1888	1892
George Braund	1							1888	
Ronald Cameron	2							1888	
John Gee	7							1888	1892
James McMahon	24							1888	1896
James Moulton	4		1			1	6	1888	1892
Ben Newell	12	2					4	1888	1892
Edward Rice	3							1888	
Louis Veech	7							1888	1889
Greg Wade	3	2					4	1888	
William Watkins	1							1888	
Herbert Britten	4	1					3	1889	1894
Paddy Flynn	6	2	8		2		33	1889	
John Fraser	15	3					9	1889	1897
Tom Hanley	1				1		4	1889	
Fred Hill	2							1889	
Ernie Hutton	3	3					6	1889	
Jack Meagher	7							1889	1890
Ned Mills	1							1889	
Harry Moses	10							1889	1892
Joe Otway	4				1		4	1889	
Tom Palmer	3	3					7	1889	
Albert Sefton	2	1					3	1889	
William Sutherland	4	2					6	1889	1890
Bob Whiteside	2	1					3	1889	1895
Bob Lusk	2	1					3	1890	
Cecil McMurdo	8							1890	1893
Ernest Roberts	8	2					6	1890	1894
Walter Suttor	6							1890	1891
Harry Abbott	5							1891	1897
Edward Bowman	8	1					3	1891	1893
Joe Davie	4	1					1	1891	
Walter Faulkner	2							1891	
William Lyons	2							1891	
Edward McCausland	4							1891	
George Osborne	4	1					1	1891	
Vernon Reed	6							1891	1892
Henry Shepherd	3	1					1	1891	
Selwyn Smith	1							1891	
Les Wickham	7	2					4	1891	1893
Harry Wood	4		2				4	1891	1898
James Wood	2							1891	
Joe Wood	6							1891	1894
Jim Cowan	1							1892	
Harry Hale	2							1892	
James Heffernan	1							1892	
George Lusk	11	2	4	1	1	2	29	1892	1894
Ernest Martineer	1							1892	
George Outram	8	2					6	1892	1897
Philip Phillips	1							1892	
Albert Shappere	2							1892	
Frank Surman	16	4					12	1892	1894
Mal Tunks	1							1892	
Michael Veech	11	3					9	1892	1896
Tom Alcock	20							1893	1895
Roland Allport	3							1893	
Bill Barrie	17		6	2		2	26	1893	1897
James Carson	22	4	5	1			25	1893	1899
Wally Cobb	18	1	9	2		1	31	1893	1895
Tom Duggan	4							1893	1898
Hugh Fish	1							1893	
Bill Galloway	22	5					15	1893	1899
Fred Henlen	28	7	2				25	1893	1897
William Hiddlestone	3	2					6	1893	
Paddy Lane	25	16	5				58	1893	1898
Nicholas Lohan	17	2					6	1893	1897
J. Manlowe	1							1893	
George Moore	5							1893	1894
Basil Sawyer	9							1893	1895
Allan Scott	1							1893	
William Thomas	2							1893	
James Barry	4							1894	
George Bliss	2							1894	
Arthur Braund	10	1					3	1894	1897
John Clayton	2							1894	
Edward Colls	1							1894	
Peter Commins	3							1894	1895
Robert Dibbs	9	1					3	1894	
Jesse Dibley	13	1					3	1894	1900
Bill Edwards	13	1					3	1894	1895
Edward Eyre	4	2					6	1894	
Alf Hanna	15	3					9	1894	1897
Les Lane	2							1894	
Robert Lewis	2							1894	
Dick Manchee	4	1					3	1894	1895
Duncan Nelson	2							1894	
H. Nelson	9	3					9	1894	1898
Harold Parish	8	2					6	1894	1895
Arthur Rankin	6							1894	
Ollie Riley	9	1					3	1894	
Arthur Scott	18	3					9	1894	1898
Henry Smith	2	1					3	1894	
William Walker	5	5					15	1894	1897
S. Walsh	2							1894	
Bill Webb	16		1				2	1894	1900
William Webber	2							1894	
Charlie White	18	5					15	1894	1904
Roger Barton	7	1					3	1895	1899
William Brown	8	1	2			1	11	1895	1897
William Cupples	1	1					3	1895	
Alex Fraser	10							1895	1899
John Hadwin	2	1					3	1895	
Harry Lott	3	2					6	1895	
George McGregor	2	1					3	1895	
Percy McNamara	23	1	4				11	1895	1904
Bill Shortland	24	3	3	1			18	1895	1901
Herman Slee	2							1895	1899
A. Stephens	1							1895	
Dooee Tanner	3							1895	
Stan Wickham	37	19	17	13		5	150	1895	1906
Arthur Gardner	5							1896	1897
William Ireland	4							1896	1898
Tom Malone	1							1896	
John O'Neil	1	1					3	1896	
Edward Rees	1							1896	
Frank Row	10							1896	1902
Norm Street	25	3					9	1896	1901
Charlie Winn	7	4					12	1896	1897
Walter Baird	5	1					3	1897	
W. Cribb	1							1897	
Jim Curley	6	5		1			18	1897	
Ernie Dooley	4							1897	
Charlie Ellis	17	3	2			1	17	1897	1904
Charlie Evans	6	1					3	1897	1898
Albert Gardiner	11		4				8	1897	1899
Billy Howe	7							1897	
Jack McLean	6							1897	1898
John McMahon	1	1					3	1897	
Syd Miller	13	15					45	1897	1899
Billy Warbrick	1							1897	
George Bouffler	7							1898	1899
Arch Boyd	8							1898	1899
Stephen Dent	1							1898	
Walter Gregory	1	1					3	1898	
Bill Hardcastle	2	1					3	1898	
Alex Kelly	7	1					3	1898	1900
Hyram Marks	9	1					3	1898	1899
Henry McCormack	2							1898	
Bill McLean	4							1898	
Iggy O'Donnell	14	2	1				8	1898	1905
Tim O'Grady	3							1898	
Tom Pauling Sr.	3							1898	1899
Lonnie Spragg	6	4	6				24	1898	1899
Frank Underwood	15							1898	1903
William Wright	14							1898	1904
John Fitzgerald	1							1898	
Robert Challoner	10							1899	1901
Walter Davis	6							1899	1903
James Joyce	17	2	4				14	1899	1903
Jack McCormack	1							1899	
Ernest McMahon	13							1899	1901
Arthur Priest	2							1899	
Peter Ward	7	3	1				11	1899	
George Wheeler	3							1899	
Frank Woodhill	4							1899	
Harry Blaney	15	8	7	2			44	1900	1902
Archibald Chisholm	2							1900	
Tom Costello	11	1					3	1900	1902
Frank Futter	7	1					3	1900	1904
John Futter	2							1900	
Ed Halloran	6	4					12	1900	1902
Victor Harris	4							1900	1903
Horace Jones	6							1900	1901
Harold Judd	36	2					6	1900	1907
Edmund Kelly	1							1900	
John Manning	16	4					12	1900	1904
Jack O'Donnell	25	4					12	1900	1905
Neil Smith	5	1					3	1900	
George Thomas	2							1900	
Alec Avern	6	1					3	1901	
Maurice Barton	5							1901	
Albert Beaumont	11							1901	1903
Ross Brown	5							1901	1904
Claude Browne	3							1901	
Alex Burdon	34	5					15	1901	1908
Tom Comber	8	3	2				13	1901	1904
Albert Conlon	4	1					3	1901	1902
John Conlon	3	1	1				5	1901	1902
Duncan Corfe	3							1901	
Alf Dobbs	3	2					6	1901	
Albert Ferrier	3							1901	
Francis Finley	16	2					6	1901	1904
Leo Finn	4	1					3	1901	
Jack Garry	4	1					3	1901	1902
Launcelot Harrison	7							1901	
Arthur Hennessy	5							1901	1904
Patrick Higgins	4	3					9	1901	
Ernie Hughes	7							1901	
Fred Lamb	12	1					3	1901	1908
William Lindsay	7	3					9	1901	
Denis Lutge	20							1901	1904
Arthur Mackenzie	4							1901	1906
John Maund	10							1901	1903
St.Andrew McDowall	3							1901	
Frank Roberts	3							1901	
Sam See	5	1	1				5	1901	
Charlie Shortland	8	1					3	1901	1902
Samuel Wilson	3							1901	
S. Allen	1							1902	
Nigel Barker	5	2					6	1902	1908
Jersey Flegg	2							1902	
Aub Johnston	10	2	3	1	1	2	27	1902	1903
Jack Verge	8			1		1	7	1902	1904
Arthur Anlezark	7							1903	1907
Snowy Baker	9							1903	1904
John Barnett	24							1903	1909
Wilfrid Barton	1							1903	
Ernest Buchanan	4							1903	
Patrick Carew	3	1					3	1903	
Victor Futter	11	4	1				14	1903	1906
Reg Harris	7	1					3	1903	1904
Bill Hirschberg	14							1903	1910
Edgar Kenna	1							1903	
Ted Larkin	5	2					6	1903	
Peter Moir	7							1903	
Walter Ogaard	3	1					3	1903	
Humphrey Oxenham	8	1					3	1903	1907
Sid Riley	1							1903	
Phil Ruthven	6							1903	1905
Pat Walsh	10	3					9	1903	1905
Jim White	7							1903	1904
Bill Burleigh	2				1		4	1904	1905
Jimmy Clarken	24	6					18	1904	1912
Arthur Fisher	2	1					3	1904	
Harry Hamill	8							1904	1906
Herbert Hawken	3							1904	
Charlie Hedley	11			1			3	1904	1906
Joe McMahon	3	1					3	1904	1905
Cecil Murnin	13	3					9	1904	1908
Norm Row	18	4	5				22	1904	1910
Clem Salmon	4							1904	
Bede Smith	21	9					27	1904	1908
Lancelot Smith	14	7	7			1	39	1904	1912
Peter Burge	26	4					12	1905	1908
Neil Hives	2	1					3	1905	
John Hoets	1							1905	
Chris McKivat	16	4					12	1905	1909
Percival Penman	4							1905	
Bill Roe	2							1905	
Charles Russell	23	16					48	1905	1909
Blair Swannell	7							1905	1906
Philip Teague	3	1					3	1905	
Fred Wood	45	6		1	1		25	1905	1914
Harold Borland	2							1906	
Howard Bullock	7	1					3	1906	1908
Ken Gavin	4	2					6	1906	1908
Billy Hill	4							1906	
Edward Mandible	10	3					9	1906	1908
Wally Matthews	9	2					6	1906	1910
Dally Messenger	12	5	13	2		1	50	1906	1907
Herbert Moran	6	1					3	1906	1908
Jack D'Alpuget	2							1907	1908
Herbert Daly	8	2					6	1907	1913
Bill Dix	12							1907	1908
Robert Graves	4							1907	
Tom Griffin	35	3					9	1907	1912
John Groundwater	4							1907	
James Hughes	8	3					9	1907	1909
John Hughes	11	2					6	1907	1911
Patrick McCue	16	3					9	1907	1909
John Rosewell	6							1907	
Johnno Stuntz	1							1907	
Harry Waddell	2							1907	
Percy Bolt	1							1908	
Ernie Booth	5	6					18	1908	1909
Daniel Carroll	15	9					27	1908	1912
Bob Craig	4							1908	1909
Fred Dibble	2							1908	
Tom Eagar	4	1	2				7	1908	1909
John Fitzhardinge	2							1908	1909
Roy Gavin	1							1908	
Charles Hammand	6							1908	1909
Jack Hickey	12	5	22	1			62	1908	1909
Bede Kenna	2			1			3	1908	1909
Fred Luscombe	2	1					3	1908	1909
Malcolm McArthur	1							1908	
Arthur McCabe	5	8					24	1908	1909
Ted McIntyre	8							1908	
Sydney Middleton	12	1					3	1908	1911
Ward Prentice	25	8	26	2		3	91	1908	1912
Leo Reynolds	11	1	5			2	19	1908	1914
Gordon Shaw	1							1908	
Stephen Slater	7	2					6	1908	1910
Bill Tremain	4							1908	1913
Ewan Anderson	1							1909	
Albert Burge	3	1	1				5	1909	
Larry Dwyer	31							1909	1919
Bill Farnsworth	4	1					3	1909	
Munro Fraser	11	3					9	1909	1911
Warwick Gregory	5	7					21	1909	1910
Percy Hale	4							1909	1910
William Hayes	2							1909	1910
Owen McCarthy	1							1909	
Charles McMurtrie	5							1909	
John Phillips	4							1909	1910
Richard Prowse	7	2					6	1909	1910
Joseph Stevenson	1	2					6	1909	
George Widmer	7	6					18	1909	1910
Bob Adamson	1							1910	
Victor Anderson	1							1910	
Alec Buckley	3							1910	
Dinny Campbell	8	3					9	1910	
Arthur Curran	1							1910	
Alf Dunbar	9	3					9	1910	1912
Ted Fahey	39	2	1				8	1910	1919
Harold W. George	20	5					15	1910	1914
Herb Gilbert	4	4					12	1910	
Charlie Hodgins	6	1					3	1910	
George Hulm	2							1910	
Bob Stuart	6							1910	1911
W. Thomas	1							1910	
Harald Baker	5							1911	1914
Oscar Dean	5	7					21	1911	
Hubert Jones	21	9					27	1911	1914
Fred Kirkby	4							1911	1912
Lawrie Mayo	7	6					18	1911	1912
George Pugh	5	2					6	1911	
Doug Reid	1							1911	
Henry Stewart	3	3	2				13	1911	
Jim Wylie	5							1911	1912
Fred Aarons	3							1912	
Henry Cameron	2							1912	
William Carmody	3							1912	
Jim Duffy	13	5					15	1912	1914
Ralph Hill	7	2					6	1912	1913
Robert Massie	4							1912	1913
Montagu Massy-Westropp	5	1					3	1912	1914
Claud O'Donnell	9	1					3	1912	1914
Dudley Suttor	8	7					21	1912	1914
William Tasker	13	4	5				22	1912	1914
William T. Watson	22	2					6	1912	1920
Larry Wogan	37	10	1	1	1		39	1912	1924
Jackie Beith	5		3				6	1913	1920
James Bosward	2	1					3	1913	1919
Ernie Carr	16	17					51	1913	1919
Peter Coll	2							1913	
James Cooney	3				1		4	1913	
Robert Farrell	3							1913	
Reg Fusedale	3							1913	
Leo Heath	2							1913	
Bryan Hughes	3							1913	1914
Clarrie Prentice	6							1913	1914
Arthur Rosenthal	3							1913	
Stuart Spratt	1		1				2	1913	
Fred Thompson	10							1913	1914
Alfred Walker	24	5	4				23	1913	1924
Clarrie Wallach	10	1					3	1913	1914
Gus Walters	5							1913	1914
Robert Aspinall	2		1				2	1914	
H. Barnes	4							1914	
Ron Bolden	3	2					6	1914	
Frank Buckle	2							1914	
Tom Cooney	1							1914	
Onslow Humphreys	17	1		1			6	1914	1925
Harold Leddy	4							1914	
Bill O'Toole	3	1	1				5	1914	
Richard Simpson	1		1				2	1914	
Harold Williams	1							1914	
John Bond	16	4					12	1919	1921
Walter Bradley	2							1919	
Peter Buchanan	7		2	1			7	1919	1923
Slip Carr	14	16					48	1919	1921
Roy Chambers	7	2					6	1919	1921
Viv Dunn	15	1					3	1919	1921
Frank Eyre	2							1919	
Bob Friend	6							1919	
Keith Garrett	1							1919	
Ashton Gregg	1							1919	
Francis Gwynne	4	3					9	1919	
Dallas Hodgins	3	2			1		10	1919	
John Holdsworth	12	2					6	1919	1922
Clarrie Ives	2	1					3	1919	
Darby Loudon	16	4	9	4			42	1919	1922
Geoff Marshall	1							1919	
Arthur Mayne	10	10					30	1919	1922
George McKay	14	5					15	1919	1922
Norm Mingay	22	7	33	6		2	111	1919	1923
Irving Ormiston	4	1					3	1919	1920
Godfrey See	1							1919	
Edmund Sheppard	3	2					6	1919	
Charlie Thompson	18							1919	1924
Gordon Walker	3							1919	1921
Tom Davis	33	4					12	1920	1925
Ray Elliott	25	1					3	1920	1923
Clive Farquhar	1							1920	
Charlie Fox	37	4					12	1920	1928
Watty Friend	10							1920	1923
Tom Lawton	39	5	73	9	1		192	1920	1928
Robert Marrott	2	1					3	1920	
Roland Raymond	13	10					30	1920	1923
Jackie Shute	4	3					9	1920	1922
Geoff Wyld	1							1920	
Duncan Fowles	15							1921	1923
Reg Lane	2							1921	
Otto Nothling	33	5	7	5	2		52	1921	1924
John Pym	7	7			1		25	1921	1923
Billy Sheehan	33	8	5				34	1921	1930
Tom Smith	25	2					6	1921	1925
Bot Stanley	27	12*	10	7	1		81	1921	1924
Geoff Steanes	3	1					3	1921	
Joe Thorn	13	2					6	1921	1922
Johnnie Wallace	33	19					57	1921	1928
Jock Blackwood	55	3					9	1922	1928
Jack Bonner	8							1922	1924
Roy Cooney	1	1					3	1922	
Bill Douglas	1							1922	
Reg Ferguson	12	2					6	1922	1930
Bill Marrott	11	4					12	1922	1923
Larry Newman	1	1					3	1922	
Henry Pigott	1							1922	
Norm Smith	14	4					12	1922	1925
Johnny Taylor	2	2	3	1			15	1922	
Ted Thorn	43	7	9	1			42	1922	1928
Alexander Armstrong	5							1923	
Allen Bowers	24	22					66	1923	1927
Hugh Buntine	6		2	1			7	1923	1924
John Crakanthorp	5							1923	
Owen Crossman	29	21	17	2			103	1923	1930
Jack Duncan	20		1				2	1923	1930
Danie Erasmus	6	4					12	1923	
Arthur Erby	9							1923	1925
Gregor George	25	1	2				7	1923	1929
Ted Greatorex	32	14					42	1923	1928
Bob Loudon	39	23*					69	1923	1934
Wally Meagher	29	2				1	9	1923	1929
Harry Pascoe-Pearce	1							1923	
Harry Tancred	2							1923	
Hugh Taylor	9							1923	1924
Herb Trousdale	2							1923	
Reg Foote	8	4					12	1924	1926
Roy Hoskins	3							1924	
Ernie Ritchie	4							1924	1925
Robert Anderson	1							1925	
Clive Bondfield	1							1925	
Wylie Breckenridge	38	5					15	1925	1930
Harry Bryant	11	2					6	1925	1927
Fred Doran	2	2					6	1925	
Jack Ford	50	26					78	1925	1930
John Hill	1							1925	
Arthur Jamieson	1							1925	
Bruce Judd	58	2					6	1925	1934
Syd King	42	2					6	1925	1932
Bill Laycock	12	2					6	1925	1929
Charles Morrissey	13	6					18	1925	1926
Patrick Mulligan	3				1		4	1925	
Len Palmer	5							1925	
Alf Rainbow	1							1925	
Ernie Reid	9	5					15	1925	
Wal Rigney	9	2					6	1925	1926
Alex Ross	66		50	21	1		167	1925	1934
Colin Shaw	8							1925	
Harold Snell	9	1					3	1925	1928
Ken Tarleton	15							1925	1928
Don Telford	15	1					3	1925	1930
Arthur Toby	10							1925	
Harry Woods	34	3					9	1925	1930
Ray Bowden	1							1926	
Ian Comrie-Thomson	10							1926	1929
Arthur Finlay	43	5					15	1926	1930
Wal Ives	5							1926	1929
George Mackay	1							1926	
Stuart McLaren	1							1926	
Merv Rylance	1							1926	
Geoff Storey	35	3					9	1926	1932
Jim Tancred	23	7					21	1926	1929
Cyril Towers	85	51	18	10			219	1926	1938
Malcolm Blair	20	5					15	1927	1932
Geoff Bland	21							1927	1932
Clyde Cant	2		4	2			14	1927	1928
Bill Cerutti	58	14					42	1927	1939
Ben Egan	10	3					9	1927	1931
Tom Egan	1							1927	
Eric Ford	28	26					78	1927	1929
Jack Forsayth	1							1927	
Cam Gordon	14	15					45	1927	1929
Edward Hurrell	1							1927	
Allan Johnstone	1	2					6	1927	
Norm Lamport	4							1927	1929
Syd Malcolm	46	3	3		1		19	1927	1934
Billy Mann	15	14					42	1927	1929
Jack O'Connor	15	4					12	1927	1930
Cec O'Dea	2							1927	1928
Bryan Palmer	7	6					18	1927	1931
Arnold Tancred	16	1					3	1927	1928
Roland Waddington	3	1					3	1927	1929
Bert Abbott	4	2		1			9	1928	1929
Eric Bardsley	7							1928	
Harry Bartley	11	1	15	1			36	1928	1930
Donald Bull	4							1928	
Robert Burge	6	1					3	1928	
Kevin Burke	2							1928	1929
Bruce Caldwell	4							1928	1929
Bernard Croft	5	4	3	1			21	1928	
Wilfred Gay	1							1928	
Bill Hemingway	7	9	1				29	1928	1931
John Lamb	7							1928	
Bill Langenberg	3							1928	1932
Allen Munsie	4	1					3	1928	
John O'Donnell	11							1928	1929
Walter Phipps	4							1928	
Myer Rosenblum	9	4					12	1928	
Alf Smairl	7	3	1				11	1928	1929
John Thornton	1							1928	
Bob Westfield	14		1	2			8	1928	1937
Bill White	31	18		1			57	1928	1935
John Einerson	1							1929	
John Georgeson	1							1929	
John Gibson	2							1929	
Norm Hardy	1							1929	
Jack Harris	1							1929	
Harold Herd	7							1929	1934
Alan Kennedy	8	8					24	1929	1934
Wal Moore	2							1929	1932
Jack Morrison	4	2					6	1929	1930
Len Palfreyman	21	1					3	1929	1933
Reg Phipps	2							1929	1930
Alan Thorpe	1							1929	
Jim Carlton	2	2					6	1930	
Phil Carter	2	1					3	1930	
Geoff Dangar	3	2					6	1930	
Norm Garvey	3	1					3	1930	
Aub Hodgson	28	10	7	6			62	1930	1939
Bill Leckie	3							1930	
Wal Mackney	10	5					15	1930	1935
Mark Morton	23	6					18	1930	1935
Glaud Rodger	3	2					6	1930	
Mick Stewart	4		4	2			14	1930	
Martin Butler	10	2					6	1931	1933
Harold Hume	5							1931	1933
Tom McKeon	7	3					9	1931	1933
Max Morey	1							1931	
Alan Newton	3							1931	
James Pashley	2	1					3	1931	1932
Tom Perrin	8							1931	1934
Harold Primrose	8	1					3	1931	1935
Gordon Ross	3							1931	
Reg Shirt	1							1931	
Viv Thicknesse	1							1931	
Harold Tolhurst	9	7					21	1931	1933
Neville Wentworth	2							1931	
Jim Young	8	6					18	1931	1934
John Barker	3							1932	
Ron Biilmann	3							1932	1934
Cliff Campbell	4	1					3	1932	1934
Bill Coleman	1							1932	
Harry Cook	1							1932	
Bert Grace	5	2					6	1932	
Eric Hind	2	1					3	1932	
Jack Kelaher	17	10					30	1932	1939
Eden Love	4	1					3	1932	1934
Arthur Martel	15	2					6	1932	1937
Ron McCaffery	5	1					3	1932	1939
Francis McPhillips	1							1932	
Jan McShane	12							1932	1937
Robert Miller	6	1					3	1932	
Frank O'Loan	1							1932	
Cec Barnes	6		18	6			54	1933	
Dudley Beer	5	1					3	1933	
Eric Dunnicliff	2							1933	
Gordon Hayman	1							1933	
Col Hodgson	5	1					3	1933	
John Hooton	8	6					18	1933	1935
Bert Horsell	3							1933	
Ernie Howarth	5							1933	1935
Bill Hunter	1							1933	
Bill Johnson	7	1					3	1933	1935
Darren Joyce	2	1					3	1933	
Russ Kelly	28	3					9	1933	1939
Bob Mackey	3	1					3	1933	1934
Tom Mau	1							1933	
Vic Newnham	2							1933	
William Pashley	4	1					3	1933	1935
Ron Penfold	1							1933	
Ralph Rowntree	4							1933	
Jim Sharman	1							1933	
Arthur Shepherd	1							1933	
Ron Walden	24	3	1				11	1933	1937
Harry Wines	2							1933	
Norm Arnold	4							1934	
Mack Becher	1							1934	
Lionel Broadhead	3							1934	1935
Kevin Callen	4	1					3	1934	1938
Ernest Chin	2							1934	
Dave Cowper	4		1				2	1934	1935
Robert Duval	2							1934	1935
Tom Hills	6	3	1	1			14	1934	1939
Alan Holland	2							1934	1935
Rex Larnach-Jones	7	1	3	1			12	1934	1935
Arthur Malcolm	3							1934	1935
Bill O'Connor	8	4					12	1934	1939
Vic Richards	18	7			1		25	1934	1939
Keith Storey	6							1934	1936
David Walker	3	4					12	1934	1936
Bimbo White	9							1934	1936
Nick Aboud	1							1935	
Terry Brown	2							1935	
Harry Crow	1		1				2	1935	
Mike Gibbons	21	2	6	5	1		37	1935	1939
Nick Howlett	5							1935	
Eric Hutchinson	12							1935	1939
Winston Ide	5	3					9	1935	1936
Jack Leach	1			1			3	1935	
Frank Lehmann	15	1					3	1935	1939
Jack Malone	18	3					9	1935	1939
Arnold Marshall	4	2					6	1935	
Bill McLaughlin	8	3					9	1935	1939
Dave McMaster	3							1935	1936
Bob Miller	3							1935	1939
Rod Miller	1							1935	
Ron O'Gorman	1							1935	
Mac Ramsay	13	1					3	1935	1939
Ron Rankin	22	3	24	8			81	1935	1946
Bede Sutton	5	1	1	1			8	1935	
Jack Turnbull	12	2					6	1935	1948
Geoff Wansey	2							1935	1938
Les Bedford	4							1936	
Keith Buxton	1							1936	
Bryan Egan	2							1936	
Yorke Fleming	1	1					3	1936	
Jack Gray-Spence	5	2					6	1936	1937
Frank Hutchinson	10	2					6	1936	1939
Ian McKibbin	2	1					3	1936	
Frank O'Brien	11	13	7	1			56	1936	1938
Chad Paton	7	3	1				11	1936	1938
Tom Pauling Jr.	5	2	2				10	1936	1937
Bill Powell	2	1	2				7	1936	
Jack Ryan	1	1					3	1936	
John Scutt	2	1					3	1936	
Alby Stone	18							1936	1945
Gordon Stone	8	1	3				9	1936	1939
Jack Taylor	2							1936	
Keith Windon	16	8					24	1936	1946
Vaud Burgess	3							1937	1938
Mick Clifford	7		3	2			12	1937	1939
Paul Collins	7	1					3	1937	1939
Lin Fleming	2							1937	1938
Keith Gilleland	5	2					6	1937	1938
John Groves	4		1				2	1937	1939
Vernon Auland	2							1938	
Edward Callaghan	4	1					3	1938	
C. H. Gerrand	3							1938	1939
Bjarne Halvorsen	1							1938	
Phil Hardcastle	9							1938	1950
Bob McCarthy	2							1938	
Vic Miller	3	1					3	1938	
Mick Moran	2	4					12	1938	
Frank Purnell	4							1938	1939
Leon Quinlivan	2			1			3	1938	
Cecil Ramalli	4	2					6	1938	1939
Len Smith	9	5					15	1938	1939
Raymond Thorold-Smith	1							1938	
Bill Travers	2							1938	
Harold Walker	2	2					6	1938	
Dudley Atkins	1							1939	
Arthur Bowrey	5							1939	
Des Carrick	4	1					3	1939	
Vince Hardiman	1							1939	
Bill Harris	1	1					3	1939	
Brian Oxenham	2	1					3	1939	
Basil Porter	3	2					6	1939	
Jackie Rowse	2							1939	
Bill Ryan	2	1					3	1939	
Colin Sefton	3							1939	
Sam Wogan	1							1939	
Arthur Buchan	11	2					6	1945	1949
Charlie Clarke	1							1945	
Rudi Cornelsen	1							1945	
Mick Cremin	10	3					9	1945	1947
Ernie Freeman	1							1945	
Owen Houston	1							1945	
Jim Keen	1							1945	
Bob MacKerras	1							1945	
Doug McCloskey	1							1945	
Perc Newton	4							1945	1953
John North	1							1945	
Colin Schomberg	1		2		1		8	1945	
Bill Simpson	1	1					3	1945	
Max Smythe	1							1945	
Trevor Allan	17	12	2	4	1		55	1946	1950
Des Bannon	1	1					3	1946	
Cyril Burke	37	8	8	4			52	1946	1958
Roy Cawsey	4							1946	1949
Wal Dawson	13	1					3	1946	1951
Alan Dennett	3							1946	
Charlie Eastes	15	26					78	1946	1951
John Fuller	3	2					6	1946	1947
Paul Johnson	4	5					15	1946	
Ken Kearney	7	2					6	1946	1947
Joe Kraefft	6							1946	1948
Eric Morcombe	3	3					9	1946	
Peter Preston	3	2					6	1946	
Nicholas Shehadie	37	8					24	1946	1957
Jim Stenmark	6		6	1			15	1946	1947
Eric Tweedale	13	3					9	1946	1950
Colin Windon	26	17					51	1946	1953
Len Wolfe	5							1946	1949
Roger Cornforth	10	6	2	1			25	1947	1950
Allan Edgar	1							1947	
Neville Emery	3							1947	1949
Don Furness	12							1947	1949
Max Howell	5							1947	
Doug Keller	6	2					6	1947	
Terry MacBride	2							1947	
Brian Piper	10		9	7			39	1947	1949
Arthur Tonkin	7	6					18	1947	1950
Alan Walker	10	6	9	4			48	1947	1950
Jack Blomley	15	2					6	1948	1952
Alan Cameron	26	1					3	1948	1957
Ron Campbell	5		2	2			10	1948	1951
Brian Cox	9	1					3	1948	1957
Clarrie Davis	10	9					27	1948	1952
Gordon Davis	6	2					6	1948	1955
Alec FitzSimons	1							1948	
Keith Gordon	5							1948	1951
Errol Green	1							1948	
Jim Lawler	2							1948	
Arthur Lennox	2							1948	
Don Lyall	1							1948	
John Marron	1							1948	
Warren Marsden	2	1					3	1948	1949
Jack Marshall	7	7					21	1948	1949
Ian McKellar	4	3					9	1948	1949
Alan Milne	4		3	4			18	1948	
Geoff Pettit	1							1948	
Reg Richards	5							1948	
Bernie Schober	1							1948	
John Solomon	19	10	2		1		37	1948	1955
Murray Tate	12							1948	1954
Dick Taylor	3							1948	1949
Ron Taylor	1							1948	
Jim Walsh	8							1948	1953
Bevan Wilson	4							1948	1950
Neil Adams	5							1949	1953
Jack Baxter	14							1949	1952
David Brockhoff	14	6	2				22	1949	1954
Keith Cross	27	9					27	1949	1957
Bill Gardner	9		9	4			30	1949	1950
Ralph Garner	6	5					15	1949	1953
Norm Green	2							1949	
Jim Jenkins	1							1949	
Rex Mossop	17	3					9	1949	1951
Spencer Brown	4							1950	1954
Jack Carroll	6							1950	1954
John Dart	1							1950	
Mick Devlin	1							1950	
Alf Hancock	9	3*					9	1950	1953
Don Lisle	8	6					18	1950	1951
Ian Miles	4	1					3	1950	1952
Brian Moffat	1							1950	
Phil Mooney Sr.	2							1950	
Bryan Palmer Jr.	3							1950	
Doug Stewart	2							1950	1951
Dick Tooth	14	2	5	5			31	1950	1957
Jika Travers	1							1950	
Sid Watson	2							1950	
Keith Gudsell	2	2	3				12	1951	
Brian Johnson	7	2					6	1951	1954
Neville Plowman	2							1951	
Peter Rothwell	8		10	3			29	1951	1952
Eddie Stapleton	13	10	2				34	1951	1958
Ray Walker	1							1951	
Mick Adare	1							1952	
John Bain	3							1952	1954
Herb Barker	13	5	8	4			43	1952	1958
John Bosler	2		1				2	1952	1953
Kev Coggan	2	1					3	1952	1953
Ray Colbert	3				1		3	1952	1953
Peter Cox	1							1952	
Bob Davidson	16	1					3	1952	1958
Max Elliott	7							1952	1958
Noel Hayes	3	2					6	1952	1954
Jack Hovey	1							1952	
Reg McHugh	1							1952	
Tony Miller	36	2					6	1952	1969
Joe Newsome	1			1			3	1952	
John Vincent	1							1952	
Phil Alston	2							1953	
John Ashley	1	1					3	1953	
Boyd Blackburn	9							1953	1960
Dave Bowtell	1							1953	
Tod Davis	1							1953	
Patrick Harvey	1							1953	
Vince Heinrich	3	2					6	1953	1954
Mac Hughes	9	3	1				11	1953	1957
Ned Morey	2							1953	1954
Col Orr	1							1953	
Bob Outterside	7	2					6	1953	1959
Jim Phipps	11	11					33	1953	1957
Dave Pilcher	3							1953	1954
Barry Roberts	9	6	9	4			48	1953	1960
John Stanbrook	8	7	5	4			43	1953	1958
Jack Thompson	2							1953	
Saxon White	6	1					3	1953	1957
Geoff Wilkin	1							1953	
Athol Folbigg	3							1954	
Tony Fox	4	2					6	1954	1958
Graham Galloway	1							1954	
Maurice Graham	1			1			3	1954	
Ray Love	1							1954	
John Pashley	9	2					6	1954	1958
Fred Testoni	3							1954	
John Wall	2							1954	1955
James V. Brown	9							1955	1957
Dave Emanuel	7	1					3	1955	1959
Ray Frost	1							1955	
Ron Harvey	4		5				10	1955	1958
Les Lewis	1							1955	
Peter Morton	2							1955	
Rod Phelps	13	9	2	2			37	1955	1963
Peter Phipps	2	2					6	1955	1956
Don Strachan	3							1955	
John Thornett	21	2					6	1955	1966
Graham Bailey	1	2					6	1956	
Bob Connolly	1			1			3	1956	
John H. Dowse	6		19	12	2		80	1956	1961
Keith Ellis	8	1					3	1956	1960
Bill Gahan	4							1956	1957
Bruce Gallaher	1							1956	
John Halter	2							1956	1958
Jim Harris	1							1956	
Derry Hill	3	1					3	1956	1960
Dennis Meares	4	1					3	1956	1960
Alan Morton	18	15					45	1956	1965
Jack Potts	8	2					6	1956	1959
Arthur Summons	9	2			2		12	1956	1959
Ken Chambers	2							1957	
Terry Curley	7	2					6	1957	1958
Peter Fenwicke	9	3	1	2			17	1957	1959
Bill Gunther	1							1957	
Don Logan	5	2					6	1957	1958
Alex Roberts	1							1957	
Bob Barry	1							1958	
John Carroll	9	1					3	1958	1959
Dave Cody	1							1958	
Peter Dunn	4	1					3	1958	1959
John Edwards	2							1958	1961
Bruce Galea	1			1			3	1958	
Bob Grayson	1							1958	
Rob Heming	16	1					3	1958	1966
Lloyd Hughes	1	2					6	1958	
Jim Lenehan	21	1	1	6	1		26	1958	1967
Don Lowth	2							1958	
Barry Lumsdaine	1							1958	
Don McDeed	2							1958	1960
Ronald Meadows	6							1958	1959
Eddie Purkiss	1							1958	
Terry Reid	11	3					9	1958	1962
Stuart Scotts	1							1958	
Ross Simpson	1							1958	
Adrian Smith	2	1					3	1958	1960
Norm Storey	2							1958	1962
Ken Thornett	5	1					3	1958	1959
Peter Wakeford	3							1958	1959
Ken Yanz	5	1					3	1958	1960
Ken Catchpole	26	7					21	1959	1968
Dave Collins	2							1959	
Len Diett	5							1959	1960
Beres Ellwood	17	6	17	8			76	1959	1966
Robert Heath	2							1959	
Ted Heinrich	11	1					3	1959	1964
Peter Johnson	34	2					6	1959	1971
Peter Lockwood	2	2					6	1959	
Ted Magrath	7	11	2				37	1959	1963
Ian Moutray	4	1					3	1959	1963
Jon White	12	1					3	1959	1966
Roy Braddock	3							1960	1961
Michael Cleary	8	14					42	1960	1961
George Evans	1							1960	
Kevin Graham	1							1960	
Warwick Hammond	5	1					3	1960	
Brian King	5	2					6	1960	
Jimmy Lisle	7	3					9	1960	1961
Graeme Macdougall	2							1960	1961
Jim Miller	6	1		3			12	1960	1965
George Shehadie	3	1					3	1960	
Errol Abbott	2							1961	1963
Tim Evans	1		4	1			11	1961	
John Freedman	3	1					3	1961	1963
Jim McDonnell	1							1961	
John O'Gorman	13							1961	1967
Bob Perrett	1	1					3	1961	
Peter Scott	6		2	7			25	1961	1965
Dick Thornett	4	1	1				5	1961	
Stewart Boyce	5	3					9	1962	1967
Ken McMullen	3	1					3	1962	1963
Les Austin	4	1					3	1963	1964
Bruce Bailey	1							1963	
Bill Blogg	3	3					9	1963	1965
Jim Boyce	5	6					18	1963	1965
John Brazier	2							1963	
Warwick Caisley	1							1963	
Peter Carroll	5	1					3	1963	1964
Terry Casey	2							1963	1966
Denis Cavanough	3							1963	
Geoff Chapman	3	2	5	3			25	1963	
Mal Davies	3	2					6	1963	
Greg Davis	27	4					13	1963	1972
Chris Forbes	1							1963	
Bruce Harland	2							1963	
Phil Harry	2							1963	
Phil Hawthorne	11	2	1		4		20	1963	1967
Elvin Johnson	1							1963	
Peter Jones	2							1963	
Andy Laurie	3							1963	
Ivan Mann	1							1963	
Stan Melville	1							1963	
Tony Merrett	1							1963	
Alan Minett	2							1963	1964
Ian Moffatt	2							1963	
Greg Moore	1							1963	
Keith Newman	1							1963	
Denis O'Callaghan	3	1					3	1963	1966
Don O'Sullivan	1							1963	
Bill Outterside	1							1963	
Harold Palmer	1							1963	
Roy Prosser	24							1963	1972
Gerry Rose	2	2					6	1963	
Rupert Rosenblum	14	1			7		24	1963	1973
Peter Ryan	9	3	5	1	1		25	1963	1967
Sean Spence	4							1963	
Peter Strauss	1							1963	
Reg Sutton	2							1963	
Andy Town	4	1					3	1963	1965
Ross Turnbull	9							1963	1968
John Weber	4	1		1			6	1963	1968
John Williams	2	2					6	1963	1964
Don Wroe	3							1963	1965
Tony Abrahams	10	1					3	1964	1968
Denis Cleary	8							1964	1967
Peter Crittle	8	1					3	1964	1966
Earl Flanders	1							1964	
David Grimmond	10	8					24	1964	1966
Dennis Hughes	2	1	2	4			19	1964	
John Klem	1							1964	
Bruce Mason	1							1964	
Graeme Morgan	1							1964	
Mick O'Gorman	2							1964	
Ray Pride	3	2	2				10	1964	
Malcolm Ross	1							1964	
John Rouen	3							1964	
Barry Sibley	1							1964	
Gary Smoker	3							1964	1969
Chris Wheadon	2							1964	
Bob Wilson	1	1					3	1964	
Stuart Boland	3		7	1			17	1965	1967
Paul Burke	1							1965	
Pat Cooper	3							1965	1967
Bruce Dalton	3	1					3	1965	1967
Laurie Fahy	3	1					3	1965	
Ralph Gilbert	5	2					6	1965	
Nigel van Hamburg	1							1965	
Richard Harney	1	2					6	1965	
Mick Hickman	3							1965	
Ross Latham	1	1					3	1965	
Geoff Mutton	4	3					9	1965	1967
Terry Rigney	2							1965	1970
George Ruebner	3	1	4	4			23	1965	1966
David Shepherd	8							1965	1966
Graeme Stevens	3	3					9	1965	
Kim Tabart	2							1965	
Richard Taylor	3							1965	
Andy Tyler	3							1965	
Mick Young	3							1965	
John Brass	10	2					6	1966	1968
Alan Cardy	6	3					9	1966	1968
John Francis	1	1					3	1966	
Bob Lay	2	2					6	1966	
Tony Moore	2				1		3	1966	
Hugh Rose	10	1					3	1966	1971
Phil Smith	9	1					3	1966	1968
Mick Stynes	1		2				4	1966	
Peter Sullivan	18	3					10	1966	1973
John Ballesty	4	2					6	1967	1968
Rod Batterham	19	13*	2	6			61	1967	1971
John Cole	20	11					35	1967	1974
Paul Darveniza	4							1967	1969
Mel Dunne	1							1967	
Terry Forman	3							1967	1969
Richard How	2							1967	1968
Ian Proctor	6	5					15	1967	1970
Jim Roxburgh	4							1967	1969
Jeff Sayle	3							1967	
Owen Butler	8							1968	1971
Dick Cocks	14	2					7	1968	1972
Tony Gelling	19	2					7	1968	1975
John Hipwell	28	8					27	1968	1981
Arthur McGill	19	2	21	31			141	1968	1973
Warwick Moss	6	1					3	1968	1970
Russell Tulloch	2							1968	
Ross Birrell	1			1			3	1969	
Tony Creagh	1							1969	
Paul Dawson	7							1969	1971
Ron Graham	21	1					4	1969	1979
Keith Henry	2							1969	
John Holt	1			1			3	1969	
Peter Johnston	12							1969	1978
Alan Kennington	2							1969	
Stephen Knight	12	4					12	1969	1971
Graham McClymont	1							1969	
Owen O'Donnell	2		1	1			5	1969	
Robbie Parker	1							1969	
Geoff Richardson	1							1969	
Geoff Shaw	22	4		1			16	1969	1976
Alan Skinner	1							1969	
Eric Tindall	6							1969	1973
Adrian Brett	4							1970	
Jake Howard	12							1970	1973
Brian Macauley	5							1970	
Reg Smith	26	2					7	1970	1978
Barry Stumbles	10	1	1	3			14	1970	1972
Bruce Taafe	7							1970	1972
John Weatherstone	8							1970	1974
John Winchester	1	1					3	1970	
Dave Burnet	3							1971	1972
Russell Fairfax	5		12	3	1		36	1971	1973
Peter Horton	12							1971	1975
Stuart Macdougall	5							1971	1974
Trevor Stegman	7							1971	1973
John Taylor	4	6					20	1971	1972
Rick Andrews	5							1972	1975
Garrick Fay	19	1					4	1972	1979
Igo Fisher	2							1972	
Mick Goldman	2	1					4	1972	
Lars Hedberg	3							1972	1974
Anthony Miller	1							1972	
Ross Miller	1	1					4	1972	
Laurie Monaghan	20	7	9	6			64	1972	1981
Terry Ryan	2	3					12	1972	
Bruce Battishall	1							1973	
Chris Carberry	5							1973	1976
Greg Cornelsen	11	1					4	1973	1976
Roger Davis	10							1973	1978
Stuart Gregory	1							1973	
Chris Hickman	1	1					4	1973	
Willie Jephcott	1							1973	
John Lambie	8			2			6	1973	1975
Michael Maxwell	1							1973	
Peter Rowles	2							1973	
Owen Stephens	4	3					12	1973	1974
John Berne	4	2					8	1974	1975
Charlie Blunt	5	1					4	1974	1977
Bob Brown	3		1	2			8	1974	1975
Gary Grey	4							1974	1976
Brian Mansfield	2							1974	1975
Bill McKid	12	3					12	1974	1979
Ray Price	8	2					8	1974	1975
John Blondin	1							1975	
Peter Carson	16							1975	1982
Mick Ellem	9	3	4	2			26	1975	1978
Steve Finnane	5	2					8	1975	1977
Michael Fitzgerald	1							1975	
Jim Hindmarsh	6	1	4	3			21	1975	1976
Neil Maltby	1	1					4	1975	
Kevin O'Hara	1		1				2	1975	
Gary Pearse	13	6					24	1975	1982
Ian Robertson	2	1					4	1975	
John Ryan	6	3					12	1975	1976
Steve Streeter	8	4					16	1975	1980
Ken Wright	6	1		1	1		10	1975	1978
Keith Besomo	6							1976	1979
Glenn Eisenhauer	1							1976	
Rob Leslie	2							1976	
David McKinley	1							1976	
Glenn Nichols	1	2					8	1976	
Charlie Onus	2	1					4	1976	
Steve Rowley	1							1976	
Andy Stewart	13							1976	1980
Russell Bate	1							1977	
John Bay	1							1977	
John Coolican	28	1					4	1977	1984
Paul Copeland	2		2	2			10	1977	
Philip Crowe	8	2					8	1977	1980
Paul Jelfs	1							1977	
Adrian Jones	1							1977	
Rob Monteath	1							1977	
Sean Mooney	2							1977	
Mick Nethery	2							1977	
Rob Onus	3	1					4	1977	1978
Ed Shannon	2							1977	1978
Philip Carter	2							1978	
Jim Feggans	2							1978	
Warwick Fletcher	1							1978	
David Forsythe	5							1978	1979
Tony Melrose	8		5	5			25	1978	1979
Sandy Muston	7							1978	1982
Don Price	15							1978	1981
David Rathie	3	2					8	1978	
Dennis Turnbull	4							1978	
Mark Clarebrough	2	1					4	1979	
Dave Cowlishaw	5	1					4	1979	1981
John Dawson	1							1979	
Mark Ella	26	12	2	2	9		85	1979	1984
Rodger Hall	2							1979	
Mick Martin	20	9					36	1979	1983
Mick Mathers	14							1979	1981
Don McDougall	2							1979	
Peter McPherson	2							1979	
Peter Medway	4							1979	1980
Gerry O'Neill	1							1979	
Simon Poidevin	58	6					24	1979	1992
Geoff Richards	3			3			9	1979	1981
Warwick Watkins	5							1979	1980
Mitchell Cox	11	4					16	1980	1981
Phillip Cox	14	1					4	1980	1984
Declan Curran	11							1980	1983
Glen Ella	25	9		1	3		48	1980	1987
Graeme Ewens	1							1980	
Michael Hawker	13	2			1		11	1980	1987
Bill Lyons	3							1980	
Bruce Malouf	9							1980	1983
John Maxwell	1							1980	
Bob McLean	4		7	1			17	1980	
Wally Meakes	1							1980	
Glenn da Vanzo	15	4					16	1980	1984
Lance Walker	15	1					4	1980	1985
Steve Williams	21	1					4	1980	1985
Brad Allan	2							1981	
Greg Craig	4	1					4	1981	
Gary Ella	27	4					16	1981	1988
Ross Reynolds	19	6		2			30	1981	1987
Bill Abram	3	1					4	1982	
James Black	14	4	14	6			62	1982	1985
Phil Clements	6							1982	1983
Steve Cutler	47							1982	1991
John Griffiths	2							1982	
Peter Lucas	8	1					4	1982	1984
Tony McGeoch	1							1982	
Peter Palmer	35	2					8	1982	1992
Brad Selby	5							1982	1983
Tim Sheridan	1							1982	
Paul Southwell	1	1					4	1982	
Chris Stephandellis	9	3	11	7	1		58	1982	1984
Steve Tuynman	33	6					24	1982	1990
David Codey	6							1983	1984
Peter FitzSimons	17	2					8	1983	1992
Ollie Hall	3							1983	
Steve James	10	1					4	1983	1988
Brett Papworth	19	8	8	11			81	1983	1987
Dominic Vaughan	4							1983	1990
Damian Brown	2							1984	
Matthew P. Burke	15	4					16	1984	1987
Greggory Burrow	9							1984	1986
Bill Calcraft	14	1					4	1984	1986
Nick Farr-Jones	46	17			1		71	1984	1993
Dene Glasson	4							1984	
Scott Johnson	1							1984	
Steve Lidbury	12	4					16	1984	1988
James McInerney	6	2					8	1984	1986
Ian Miller	1							1984	
David Purll	2							1984	
Enrique Rodríguez	19							1984	1987
Ian Williams	16	12					48	1984	1990
David Croft	2		6	4			24	1985	1986
James Grant	14	4					16	1985	1988
David Knox	24	6	51	38			243	1985	1995
Michael Murray	13							1985	1991
Dwayne Vignes	27	9					36	1985	1990
Lloyd Walker	25	6					24	1985	1993
Brad Burke	8							1986	1989
Chris Callow	2							1986	
Mick Carter	5							1986	1987
Duncan Hall	7							1986	
Mark Hartill	45	1					5	1986	
Andrew Leeds	19	2	21	22	1		119	1986	1988
Adrian McDonald	3							1986	1990
Rob McEwan	2	2					8	1986	
Wayne Owen	5	1					4	1986	1988
Drewe Barrett	1							1987	
Marty Beudeker	1							1987	
Kel Black	1							1987	
David Campese	34	18			2		74	1987	
David Carter	13							1987	1989
Brad Devine	1							1987	
Cameron Douglas	2							1987	1988
Damien Frawley	11	2					8	1987	1990
Tim Gavin	64	13					56	1987	
Glenn Goddard	1							1987	
Eddie Jones	12							1987	1989
Peter Kay	12							1987	1989
David Lowery	1							1987	
Ewen McKenzie	37	2					8	1987	1995
David Niu	1							1987	
David Reen	6							1987	
Ian Vest	4	1					4	1987	1988
Tim Kava	34	4					18	1988	1995
Acura Niuqila	12	8					32	1988	1990
Marty Roebuck	32	7	54	67			337	1988	1993
Brian Smith	3	1	4	9	1		42	1988	
Kent Bray	2							1989	
Andrew Cairns	4							1989	1990
Peter Challender	1							1989	
Rod Clarke	10							1989	1990
Jim Fewtrell	2							1989	
Scott Gourley	5	1					4	1989	
Michael Hayes	6	2					8	1989	
Darren Junee	43	11					46	1989	
Phil Kearns	46	3					14	1989	
Darren Quince	1							1989	
Adrian Skeggs	4							1989	1990
Geoff White	3	2					8	1989	
Geoff Bucknell	1							1990	
John Flett	4	3					12	1990	
Mick Kearins	3							1990	
Grant Lodge	3		2	2			10	1990	1991
Anthony Merlo	2							1990	
John Mulvihill	3	1					4	1990	
Alistair Murdoch	42	26					125	1990	
Phil Scarr	6	2	2	1			16	1990	1995
David Starkey	6							1990	
Richard Tombs	55	17	1				80	1990	
Jim Allen	17	4					16	1991	1992
Bob Egerton	10	5					20	1991	
Anthony Ekert	18	6					27	1991	
Matt Foldi	5	2					8	1991	
Michael Miller	7							1991	1992
Viliami Ofahengaue	31	7					30	1991	
Warwick Waugh	48	3					13	1991	
Craig Wells	10	3					12	1991	
Mark Bell	16	1					5	1992	
Andrew Blades	14	1					4	1992	
Michael Brial	33	6					29	1992	
Matthew C. Burke	36	11	24	47	1		208	1992	
Tony Dempsey	14	3					15	1992	1994
Jim Fenwicke	3							1992	
Peter Jorgensen	14	10					42	1992	1994
Tim Kelaher	24	11	12	6			97	1992	
Kevin O'Kane	8	1					5	1992	
Chris Saunders	4	1					4	1992	1993
Scott Barker	1							1993	
Scott Bowen	27	8					42	1993	
Tim Dalton	4							1993	1994
Matt Dixon	12	4					20	1993	
Fili Finau	17	2					10	1993	
John Hearn	4							1993	
Andrew Heath	11							1993	
John Langford	10	1					5	1993	1994
Scott Neilson	2							1993	
Sam Payne	39	11	3				61	1993	
Semi Taupeaafe	11	6					30	1993	
Graeme Thompson	1							1993	
Tim Wallace	19	2	43	37	2		213	1993	
Simon Whyte	7	1					5	1993	1994
Sam Domoni	32	3					15	1994	
Owen Finegan	6	3					15	1994	1995
Mark Giacheri	3							1994	
Mitch Hardy	3							1994	
Paul Horton	1	2					10	1994	
Jason Madz	16	6					30	1994	
Daniel Manu	15	5					25	1994	
Justin Nowlan	1	1					5	1994	
Brett O'Neill	1							1994	
Matthew Stocks	2							1994	
Steve Talbot	14	2					10	1994	
George Websdale	4	1					5	1994	1995
John Welborn	16	2					10	1994	
Graeme Bond	7	3					15	1995	
Richard Harry	13	1					5	1995	
Adam Magro	3	2					10	1995	
Steve Merrick	3	2					10	1995	

=== Super Rugby AUS players ===
No.	Name	Caps	Tries	C	P	DG	Points	Debut	Last
1	Jamie Adamson	4	3				15	12/09/2025	05/10/2025
2	Miles Amatosero	6						12/09/2025	27/09/2026
3	Daniel Botha	4						12/09/2025	05/10/2025
4	Lawson Creighton	4						12/09/2025	05/10/2025
5	Ethan Dobbins	8	4				20	12/09/2025	03/10/2026
6	Chlayton Frans	3						12/09/2025	27/09/2025
7	Sid Harvey	7	2	24	1		61	12/09/2025	27/09/2026
8	Jimmy Hendren	4	4				20	12/09/2025	05/10/2025
9	Tom Lambert	7						12/09/2025	03/10/2026
10	Henry O'Donnell	1						12/09/2025	12/09/2025
11	Matt Philip	2						12/09/2025	05/10/2025
12	Jackson Ropata	4	1				5	12/09/2025	05/10/2025
13	Otto Serfontein	8	2				10	12/09/2025	03/10/2026
14	Leafi Talataina	4						12/09/2025	05/10/2025
15	Teddy Wilson	7	4				20	12/09/2025	03/10/2026
16	Isaac Aedo Kailea	5						12/09/2025	13/09/2026
17	Apolosi Ranawai	4						12/09/2025	05/10/2025
18	Ben Grant	4	1				5	12/09/2025	05/10/2025
19	Michael McDonald	4	1				5	12/09/2025	05/10/2025
20	Austin Durbridge	4	1				5	12/09/2025	05/10/2025
21	James McGregor	3						12/09/2025	27/09/2025
22	Oniti Finau	3	1				5	12/09/2025	03/10/2026
23	Leo Jacques	4	1				5	12/09/2025	05/10/2025
24	Joey Fowler	3						20/09/2025	05/10/2025
25	Clem Halaholo	3	3				15	20/09/2025	05/10/2025
26	Bruce Kauika-Petersen	3						20/09/2025	05/10/2025
27	Joey Walton	1						05/10/2025	05/10/2025
28	Max Burey	4		4			8	13/09/2026	03/10/2026
29	Eamon Doyle	4						13/09/2026	03/10/2026
30	Edwin Langi	4						13/09/2026	03/10/2026
31	Marshall Le Maitre	4	1				5	13/09/2026	03/10/2026
32	George Poolman	3						13/09/2026	27/09/2026
33	Pete Samu	1						13/09/2026	13/09/2026
34	Latrell Smiler Ah-Kiong	4	3				15	13/09/2026	03/10/2026
35	Justice Taumoepeau	1						13/09/2026	13/09/2026
36	Freedom Vaha'akolo	4	2				10	13/09/2026	03/10/2026
37	Brady Dawson	4						13/09/2026	03/10/2026
38	Isaac Fonua	4						13/09/2026	03/10/2026
39	Angus Scott-Young	4						13/09/2026	03/10/2026
40	Will Goddard	3						13/09/2026	03/10/2026
41	Tom Girle	3						13/09/2026	03/10/2026
42	Angus Grover	3		2			4	13/09/2026	27/09/2026
43	Jack Hardy	1						13/09/2026	13/09/2026
44	Joe Dillon	4	1				5	13/09/2026	03/10/2026
45	Joe Mangelsdorf	3						19/09/2026	03/10/2026
46	Luke Reimer	3						19/09/2026	03/10/2026
47	Toby Brial	2						19/09/2026	03/10/2026
48	Tyler Maybery	1						19/09/2026	19/09/2026
49	Charlie Bird	2	1				5	19/09/2026	03/10/2026
50	Nick Chan	3						19/09/2026	03/10/2026
51	Folau Fainga'a	2						27/09/2026	03/10/2026
52	Ben Fuhiniu	2						27/09/2026	03/10/2026
53	Luca Cleverley	1						27/09/2026	27/09/2026
54	Nate Tiitii	1						27/09/2026	27/09/2026
55	Hadley Tonga	1	1				5	03/10/2026	03/10/2026
