= Colin Shaw =

Colin Shaw may refer to:

- Colin Shaw (rugby union, born 1902) (1902–1976), rugby union player who represented Australia
- Colin Shaw (New Zealand footballer), former football (soccer) player who represented New Zealand at international level in the 1960s
- Colin Shaw (Australian footballer) (born 1950), Australian rules footballer
- Colin Shaw (canoeist) (born 1954), Canadian sprint canoer
- Colin Shaw (rugby union, born 1983), Scotland 7s international rugby union player
