= Crakanthorp =

Crakanthorp is a surname. Notable people with the surname include:

- John Crakanthorp (1901–1983), Australian rugby union player
- Spencer Crakanthorp (1885–1936), Australian chess player
- Tim Crakanthorp, Australian politician

== See also ==
- Crackenthorpe (disambiguation)
- Richard Crakanthorpe (1567–1624), English Anglican priest
