= Harold Herd =

Harold Herd may refer to:

- Harold Herd (rugby union) (1910–c. 1962), rugby union player who represented Australia
- Harold S. Herd (1918–2007), American politician and jurist
