= Kevin O'Hara =

Kevin O'Hara is the name of:

- Kevin O'Hara, pseudonym of Marten Cumberland
- Kevin O'Hara (footballer) (born 1998), Scottish footballer
- Kevin O'Hara (rugby union), Australian international rugby union player
