= Dominic Byrne (rugby union) =

Australian rugby union player (born 1978)

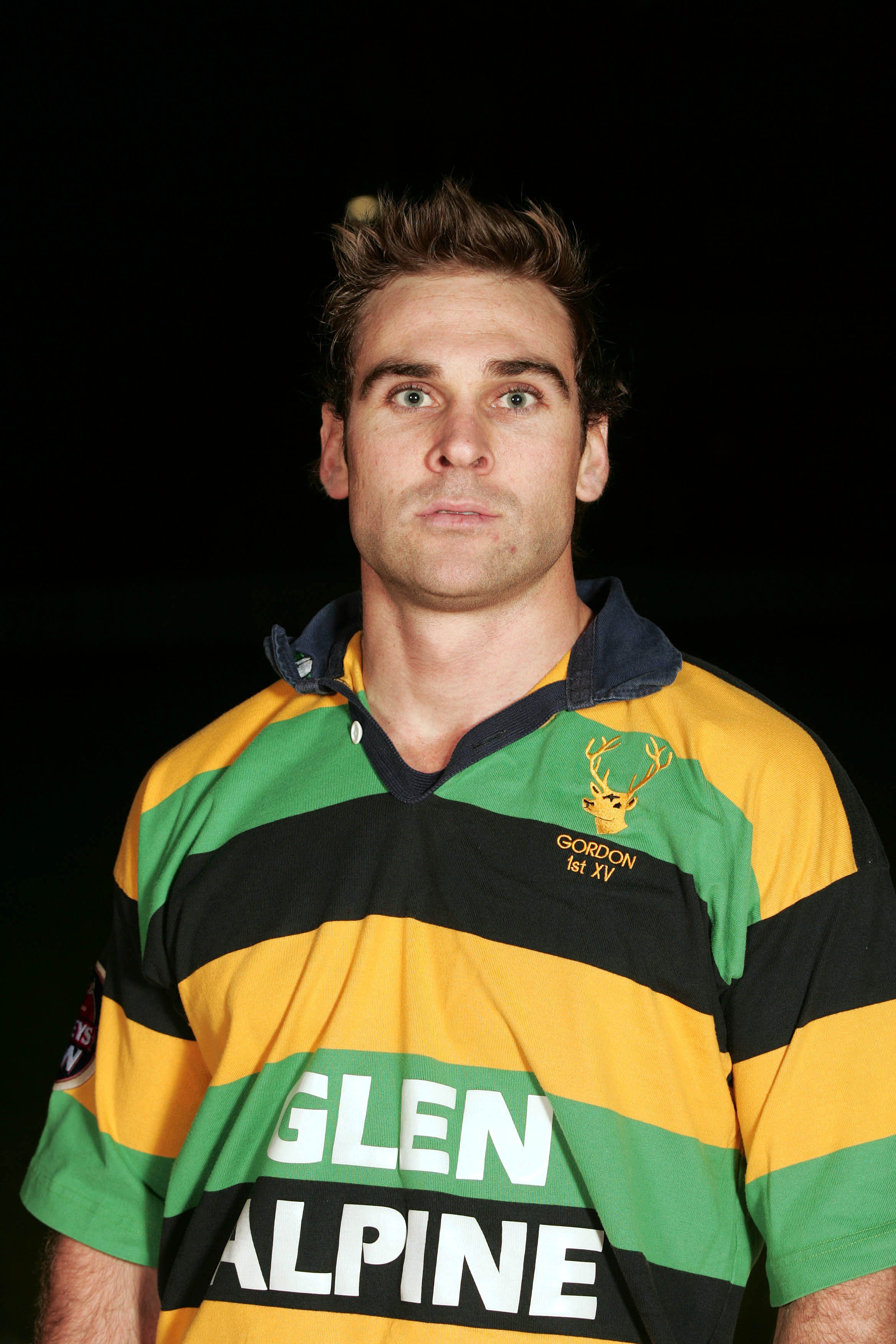
- Born: 15 January 1978 (age 48)
- School: Saint Ignatius' College

Rugby union career
- Position: Wing
Provincial / State sides
Years	Team	Apps	(Points)
2001	Taranaki	12	(15)
Super Rugby
Years	Team	Apps	(Points)
2000	Waratahs	3	(0)

Dominic Byrne (born 15 January 1978) is an Australian former professional rugby union player.

Byrne was a member of the 1996 GPS premiership-winning team with Saint Ignatius' College, Riverview.

A winger, Byrne represented Australia at under-age level and in rugby sevens.

Byrne got an opportunity with the New South Wales Waratahs during the 2000 Super 12 season, starting three matches on the left wing in place of Marc Stcherbina, against the Brumbies, Hurricanes and Crusaders.

== See also ==
- List of New South Wales Waratahs players
