= Travis Hall =

Travis Hall may refer to:

- Travis Hall (American football) (born 1972), American former NFL defensive end
- Travis Hall (rugby union) (born 1972), Australian former Super 12 player
