= Bondfield =

Bondfield is a surname. Notable people with the surname include:

- Clive Bondfield (born c. 1899), Australian rugby union player
- Margaret Bondfield (1873–1953), British Labour politician
