= Beith (surname) =

Beith is a Scottish surname. Notable people with the name include:

- Sir Alan Beith (born 1943), British politician
- Alexander Beith (1799–1891), Scottish divine and author
- Gilbert Beith (1827–1904), Scottish merchant and politician
- Jackie Beith (1893–1961), Australian rugby union player
- Sir John Beith (1914–2000), British diplomat
- Major-General John Hay Beith (1876–1952), British schoolmaster, soldier and writer using the name Ian Hay
- Robert Beith (1843–1922), Canadian politician
