= Alby Stone =

- Full name: Albert Hotston Stone
- Born: 31 January 1912 Roseville, Sydney, Australia
- Died: 13 October 1968 (aged 56)

Rugby union career
- Position: Hooker
International career
Years	Team	Apps	(Points)
1937–38	Australia	3	(0)

Albert Hotston Stone (31 January 1912 — 13 October 1968) was an Australian rugby union international.

Born in Sydney, Stone was educated at Sydney Grammar School, where he starred in the 1929 1st XV premiership team, to earn All Schools selection. He was also captain and wicket-keeper of the school's 1st XI.

Stone, a hooker, was capped three times for the Wallabies. He was an understudy to Eddie Bonis on the 1936 tour of New Zealand, where he played five tour matches. When the Springboks visited Australia in 1937, Stone came into the XV for the 2nd Test in Sydney, to end Bonis' record run of 20 consecutive matches. He earned a further two Tests the following year in home Tests against the All Blacks and was on the abandoned 1939–40 tour of Britain and Ireland.

A two-time Eastern Suburbs premiership player, Stone made 251 first-grade appearances in Sydney rugby, breaking the record of Bill Cerutti. He played 244 first-grade games for Eastern Suburbs and seven for Randwick.

== See also ==
- List of Australia national rugby union players
