= Len Palmer =

Leonard Palmer
- Full name: Leonard Alison Palmer
- Born: 31 May 1902 Sydney, Australia
- Died: 12 April 1931 (aged 28) Sydney, Australia

Rugby union career
- Position: Prop
Provincial / State sides
Years	Team	Apps	(Points)
- New South Wales
International career
Years	Team	Apps	(Points)
1925	Australia		

Leonard Alison Palmer (31 May 1902 – 12 April 1931) was an Australian international rugby union player.

Palmer was one of 12 children of Annie Maria née Smith and London–born stockbroker Joseph Palmer (from the firm Joseph Palmer and Sons). He was educated at Tudor House School in Moss Vale and Sydney Grammar School.

A sturdy prop, Palmer played for Sydney club Western Suburbs and gained his maiden New South Wales Waratahs call up in 1925 for a tour of New Zealand. His selection was considered a surprise as he had recently been overlooked for the NSW Second XV. He appeared in five uncapped fixtures for the Waratahs (retrospectively granted status as a national team), but didn't play against the All Blacks, with Tom Smith and Harry Woods preferred in the front row.

Palmer died on 12 April 1931 when the plane he was piloting crashed in the Sydney suburb of Mascot. He was an accomplished aviator, having four months prior won the Coffs Aerial Derby event on New Year Day.

== See also ==
- List of Australia national rugby union players
