= Brian Oxenham =

Australian rugby player (1916–1995)

- Full name: Brian Bede Aloysius Oxenham
- Born: 8 December 1916 Sydney, NSW, Australia
- Died: 10 April 1995 (aged 78) Sydney, NSW, Australia
- Height: 6 ft (183 cm)
- Weight: 13 st (182 lb; 83 kg)
- School: Saint Ignatius' College
- University: University of Sydney

Rugby union career
- Position: Flanker
Provincial / State sides
Years	Team	Apps	(Points)
- New South Wales
International career
Years	Team	Apps	(Points)
1939–40	Australia		

Brian Bede Aloysius Oxenham (8 December 1916 – 10 April 1995) was an Australian international rugby union player.

Born and raised in Sydney, Oxenham was educated at Saint Ignatius' College, Riverview, and in addition to rugby excelled in athletics as a schoolboy, winning a GPS 880 yards championship. He began playing rugby for Sydney University during the late 1930s, having gone there to study medicine.

Oxenham made the Wallabies squad for the 1939–40 tour of Britain and Ireland, as one of four flankers selected. He represented the Wallabies in a match in Bombay on the way over, but would never get an opportunity to gain a cap, with the tour getting called off soon after they arrived in England, due to the war.

Retiring from rugby in 1941, Oxenham became a radiology specialist.

== See also ==
- List of Australia national rugby union players
