= Crackenthorpe (disambiguation) =

Crackenthorpe is a village.

Crackenthorpe may also refer to:

- William Crackenthorpe (disambiguation)
- Emma Crackenthorpe, character in Agatha Christie's Marple
