= Jack Turnbull (rugby union) =

- Full name: Jack Edward Turnbull
- Born: 16 March 1915 Sydney, NSW, Australia
- Died: 28 May 1987 (aged 72)
- School: Sydney Boys High School

Rugby union career
- Position: Front-row
Provincial / State sides
Years	Team	Apps	(Points)
1935–48	New South Wales	12	(6)
International career
Years	Team	Apps	(Points)
1939–40	Australia		

Jack Edward Turnbull (16 March 1915 – 28 May 1987) was an Australian international rugby union player.

Known by the nickname "Straub", Turnbull was born in Sydney and attended Sydney Boys High School.

Turnbull, an Eastern Suburbs front-rower, represented New South Wales both sides of the war. He travelled to England with the 1939–40 Wallabies, but would make his only appearance in Bombay on the way back home, with the British leg of the tour having been called off due to the war, two days after they arrived.

== See also ==
- List of Australia national rugby union players
