= Mike Gibbons (rugby union) =

Rugby player (1913 - 1962)

- Full name: Eric de Courcy Gibbons
- Born: 20 October 1913 Mosman, Sydney, Australia
- Died: 20 August 1962 (aged 48)
- Height: 5 ft 5 in (165 cm)

Rugby union career
- Position: Scrum-half
International career
Years	Team	Apps	(Points)
1936	Australia	3	(2)

Eric de Courcy "Mike" Gibbons (20 October 1913 — 20 August 1962) was an Australian rugby union international.

Born in Sydney, Gibbons was a product of St. Leonard's Grammar School.

Gibbons, a 165 cm scrum-half, won a first-grade premiership with Northern Suburbs in 1933, scoring a decisive try in the grand final. He featured in another premiership in 1935 and made his NSW representative debut that year against Queensland. In 1936, Gibbons was called up by the Wallabies for the tour of New Zealand, playing in all three Tests, two against the All Blacks and one against NZ Maori. He was recalled after three years to vice captain the Wallabies on the 1939–40 tour of Britain, but the trip had to be abandoned two days after they arrived, with war declared on Germany.

== See also ==
- List of Australia national rugby union players
