= Basil Porter =

Australia international rugby union player (1916–1997)

- Full name: Basil John Porter
- Born: 24 November 1916 Forbes, NSW, Australia
- Died: 14 August 1997 (aged 80)
- Height: 5 ft 6 in (168 cm)
- Weight: 10 st (140 lb; 64 kg)

Rugby union career
- Position: Wing
Provincial / State sides
| Years | Team | Apps | (Points) |
- New South Wales
International career
| Years | Team | Apps | (Points) |
| 1939 | Australia | | |

Basil John Porter (24 November 1916 – 14 August 1997) was an Australian international rugby union player.

Porter was born in the New South Wales town of Forbes and educated at St Joseph's College in Sydney. He developed into a wing three–quarter on account of his considerable pace, having won a GPS Championship in the 100 yards. After finishing his schooling, Porter played first grade rugby for Randwick and made his state representative debut in 1939.

A member of the Wallabies squad for the 1939–40 tour of Britain, Porter never got an opportunity to feature in a Test match as the team were required to return home soon after arriving in England due to the war. His only fixture came against a local side in Bombay on the journey back to Australia.

Porter served as a corporal in the AIF during the war.

== See also ==
- List of Australia national rugby union players
