= Matt Dixon (rugby union) =

- Full name: Matthew Thomas Patrick Dixon
- Born: 14 May 1969 (age 57) Sydney, NSW, Australia
- School: Marist North Shore
- University: University of New South Wales

Rugby union career
- Position: Centre
Super Rugby
Years	Team	Apps	(Points)
1996–97	Waratahs	5	(5)

Matthew Thomas Patrick Dixon (born 14 May 1969) is an Australian former professional rugby union player.

== Rugby career ==
A centre, Dixon won three premierships with Gordon during the 1990s and featured in two Super 12 campaigns for the New South Wales Waratahs. His Waratahs contract was not renewed in 1998, with the team instead recruiting Queensland's Nathan Grey, so continued his professional career in England, playing two seasons with Richmond. He then returned to Gordon and was appointed captain for their 2000 season.

== Personal life ==
Dixon was educated at Marist North Shore and the University of New South Wales. He runs a fitness business with former Wallaby George Gregan.

== See also ==
- List of New South Wales Waratahs players
