= Jim Love (rugby league) =

Australian rugby league footballer

Personal information
- Full name: James Eli Love
- Born: 8 November 1896; Balmain, New South Wales, Australia
- Died: 25 July 1979 (aged 82)

Playing information
- Position: Fullback, Wing
Club
Years	Team	Pld	T	G	FG	P
1918–27	Balmain	90	23	0	0	69
Representative
Years	Team	Pld	T	G	FG	P
1925	New South Wales	2	0	0	0	0
- Source: As of 18 June 2019
- Relatives: Ray Love (son)

Jim Love was an Australian professional rugby league footballer who played in the 1910s and 1920s. He played for Balmain as a fullback but also played on the wing.

== Playing career ==
Love made his debut in 1918 for Balmain against Annandale. Love made 3 appearances for the club the following year as Balmain won the premiership in 1919.

In 1920, he made 3 appearances again as Balmain claimed the premiership for a second consecutive year. On both occasions there was no grand final in place so Balmain claimed the premierships by finishing first. In 1924, Love played on the wing in Balmain's 3–0 victory over Souths in the 1924 NSWRL grand final.

Love played a further 3 seasons before retiring at the end of the 1927 season. Love also represented New South Wales on 2 occasions in 1925.
