= Tim Clark (rugby union) =

- Born: 5 January 1979 (age 47)
- Height: 176 cm (5 ft 9 in)
- Weight: 75 kg (165 lb)

Rugby union career
- Position: Scrum-half
Senior career
Years	Team	Apps	(Points)
2005–07	CA Brive		
2007–11	USA Limoges		
Super Rugby
Years	Team	Apps	(Points)
2002	Waratahs	4	(0)
National sevens team
Years	Team		Comps
- Australia

Tim Clark (born 5 January 1979) is an Australian former professional rugby union player.

An Eastern Suburbs scrum-half, Clark made four appearances off the bench for the New South Wales Waratahs during the 2002 Super 12 season as Chris Whitaker's understudy. He didn't receive a contract beyond 2003 and made a switch to rugby sevens, becoming captain of Australia for the 2004–05 World Sevens Series.

Clark relocated to France in 2005 and had two seasons in the Top 14 competition with CA Brive, before taking on a player-coach role at USA Limoges, where he remained for several years.

== See also ==
- List of New South Wales Waratahs players
