= Jack Malone (rugby union) =

- Full name: John Hawkes Malone
- Born: 18 September 1912 Drummoyne, NSW, Australia
- Died: 1 May 1947 (aged 34) Medlow Bath, NSW, Australia

Rugby union career
- Position: Prop
International career
Years	Team	Apps	(Points)
1936–37	Australia	4	(0)

John Hawkes Malone (18 September 1912 — 1 May 1947) was an Australian rugby union international.

Born in Sydney, Malone was a prop, known as "Steak" on account of his large hands looking like T-bones. He attended St Joseph's College (Hunters Hill) and played his first-grade rugby for Sydney club Drummoyne.

Malone gained four caps for the Wallabies, playing all three Tests on the 1936 tour of New Zealand, then a home Test against the Springboks the following year. He was also a member of the abandoned 1939–40 tour of Britain.

A police constable, Malone was killed on duty in a road accident in 1947, while escorting a military convoy on the Great Western Highway. His motorcycle collided with a vehicle and he sustained fatal head injuries.

== See also ==
- List of Australia national rugby union players
