= Vic Richards =

- Full name: Victor Richards
- Born: 3 September 1911 Coogee, Sydney, Australia
- Died: 20 June 1983 (aged 71)

Rugby union career
- Position: Halfback
International career
Years	Team	Apps	(Points)
1936–38	Australia	5	(3)

Victor Richards (3 September 1911 — 20 June 1983) was an Australian rugby union international.

Educated at Randwick Boys High School, Richards received his lifelong nickname of "Shirts" during his schoolboy years, coined on account of the fact his father ran a men's mercery business. He left school at age 15.

Richards, a Coogee junior, was a halfback with considerable speed off the mark, whose career was beset by injuries.

A Randwick first-grade player, Richards was capped five times for the Wallabies as a fly-half. He earned his first call up for the 1934 Bledisloe Cup matches, but didn't make the XV until the 1936 tour of New Zealand, debuting against the All Blacks in Wellington. When South Africa toured the country in 1937, Richards was a member of the New South Wales team that inflicted the only Springboks loss of the tour. He was on the abandoned 1939–40 tour of Britain with the Wallabies and retired in 1940 on doctor's advice due to a chronic throat ailment.

== See also ==
- List of Australia national rugby union players
