= Omar Hassanein =

- Born: 29 December 1976 (age 49)

Rugby union career
- Position: Flanker
Amateur team(s)
Years	Team	Apps	(Points)
- Randwick
Senior career
Years	Team	Apps	(Points)
- Yokogawa
- Petrarca Padova
- Tarbes Pyrénées
Super Rugby
Years	Team	Apps	(Points)
2003	Waratahs	1	(0)

Omar Hassanein (born 29 December 1976) is an Australian former professional rugby union player.

Raised in Sydney's eastern suburbs, Hassanein is of Egyptian descent through his father and was a rugby league player in his youth, earning a two-year contract with the St. George Dragons. He competed in the lower grade Jersey Flegg and President's Cup competitions for St. George, before focusing on rugby union.

Hassanein, a flanker, played under Michael Cheika at Randwick and was capped for Australia "A". He made a solitary Super 12 appearance for the Waratahs in 2003, as the starting blindside flanker against the Blues in Sydney, then had overseas stints with Yokogawa, Petrarca Padova and Tarbes Pyrénées.

Retiring in 2007, Hassanein moved into rugby administration and is the chief executive of International Rugby Players, an Ireland-based representative body for professional rugby players.

== See also ==
- List of New South Wales Waratahs players
