= Paul Collins (rugby union, born 1915) =

Australian rugby player

- Full name: Paul Kitchener Collins
- Born: 30 August 1915 Sydney, Australia
- Died: 26 December 2005 (aged 90) Gold Coast, Australia

Rugby union career
- Position: Fly-half
International career
Years	Team	Apps	(Points)
1937–38	Australia	3	(3)

Paul Kitchener Collins (30 August 1915 — 26 December 2005) was an Australian rugby union international.

Collins was born in Sydney and attended Barker College, where he won colours in athletics, cricket and rugby union.

A fly-half, Collins was first called up by the Wallabies in 1937, making his Test debut against the Springboks at the Sydney Cricket Ground. He was capped a further two times the following year, in home Tests against the All Blacks, then made the team for the 1939–40 tour of Britain and Ireland, which was abandoned two days after they arrived in England due to the war. His first-grade rugby was played for Western Suburbs, Eastern Suburbs, Northern Suburbs and Gordon.

== See also ==
- List of Australia national rugby union players
