= Des Carrick =

Australian rugby player

- Full name: Desmond Joseph Carrick
- Born: 2 September 1919 Stanmore, NSW, Australia
- Died: 30 May 1999 (aged 79)

Rugby union career
- Position: Centre
Provincial / State sides
Years	Team	Apps	(Points)
- New South Wales
International career
Years	Team	Apps	(Points)
1939–40	Australia		

Desmond Joseph Carrick (2 September 1919 – 30 May 1999) was an Australian international rugby union player.

Carrick was born in Sydney and educated at St Joseph's College, Hunters Hill, where he captained the first XV.

A Gordon player, Carrick had a quick rise to representative rugby, making his New South Wales debut at the age of 19, then earning a place on the Wallabies squad for the 1939–40 tour of Britain and Ireland, with the young centre preferred over veteran Cyril Towers. The tour was cancelled due to World War II, soon after the team arrived in England, but he did get the opportunity to represent Australia against the Gymkhana XV during a stopover in Bombay on the trip home.

Carrick served in the army during the war and reached the rank of Lance Sergeant. He considered signing with rugby league club Newtown, but continued as a rugby union player after the war, before retiring in 1946.

== See also ==
- List of Australia national rugby union players
