= Jon Hart =

Australian rugby union player (born 1969)

- Born: 16 July 1969 (age 57)

Rugby union career
- Position: Flanker / Lock
Amateur team(s)
Years	Team	Apps	(Points)
- Warringah
Super Rugby
Years	Team	Apps	(Points)
1998–99	Waratahs	6	(0)

Jon Hart (born 16 July 1969) is an Australian former professional rugby union player.

Hart grew up in Sydney with basketball as his preferred sport and in 1989/90 had trials with the Sydney Kings.

A Warringah player, Hart was a pacy forward, used as a flanker and lock. He appeared intermittently for the New South Wales Waratahs during the 1998 and 1999 Super 12 seasons, playing in six fixtures.

== See also ==
- List of New South Wales Waratahs players
