= Jason Reilly =

Australian rugby union player (born 1970)

- Born: 22 August 1970 (age 56)
- Height: 184 cm (6 ft 0 in)
- Weight: 114 kg (251 lb)
- School: Newington College
- University: University of Sydney; University of Cambridge

Rugby union career
- Position: Prop
Super Rugby
| Years | Team | Apps | (Points) |
| 2000 | Waratahs | 6 | (0) |

Jason Reilly (born 22 August 1970) is an Australian former professional rugby union player.

== Biography ==
A prop, Reilly was an Australian Schoolboys representative player in 1988, while attending Newington College.

Reilly started in professional rugby with the Queensland Reds, primarily as a reserves player, but did make a first team appearance against Otago. He signed a casual mid-season contract for the New South Wales Waratahs during their 2000 Super 12 campaign in an attempt improve an underperforming scrum, replacing Rod Moore as tight-head for the final six rounds. At club level, Reilly played with Sydney University, where he had a sports scholarship to study for a master's degree in English and history. He continued his studies at the University of Cambridge and featured in their 2002 Varsity match win over Oxford University.

== See also ==
- List of New South Wales Waratahs players
