= Fred Doran =

- Full name: Frederick Graham Doran
- Born: 25 February 1903 Sydney, Australia
- Died: 29 September 1958 (aged 55)

Rugby union career
- Position: Centre
Provincial / State sides
| Years | Team | Apps | (Points) |
- New South Wales
International career
| Years | Team | Apps | (Points) |
| 1925 | Australia | | |

Frederick Graham Doran (25 February 1903 – 29 September 1958) was an Australian international rugby union player.

A backline player, Doran spent his career with Glebe-Balmain, Manly and North Sydney. He gained a place in the New South Wales team for a 1925 tour of New Zealand, which was effectively a full international squad as this was Australia's only representative side at the time. Selected as a back up fly–half for Tom Lawton, Doran got his only opportunities on tour as a stand in centre, appearing in four non international fixtures.

Doran's father was a renowned yachtsman and he was himself an active sailor.

== See also ==
- List of Australia national rugby union players
