= Tim Rapp =

Australian rugby union player (born 1978)

- Born: 17 October 1978 (age 48)
- School: Singleton High School
- Occupation: Sports coach

Rugby union career
- Position: Scrum-half
Super Rugby
Years	Team	Apps	(Points)
2002	Waratahs	3	(0)

Tim Rapp (born 17 October 1978) is an Australian former professional rugby union player.

A NSW Country Cockatoos product, Rapp was educated at Singleton High School and represented Australian Schoolboys in matches against Ireland and New Zealand. He was also an Australian under-19s and under-21s halfback.

Rapp started out in the Shute Shield playing for the short-lived Newcastle Wildfires side, before moving down to Sydney and linking up with Southern Districts, where he competed from 2000 to 2005. He was involved with the NSW Waratahs setup during his time at Southern Districts and made three appearances off the bench early in the 2002 Super 12 season, serving as back-up for scrum-half Chris Whitaker.

Formerly a coach of the NSW under-20s, Rapp is now the Director of Coaching Development at Newington College.

== See also ==
- List of New South Wales Waratahs players
