= Luke Inman =

- Born: 27 December 1977 (age 48)
- School: Waverley College
- University: University of Sydney
- Notable relative: Mitch Inman (brother)
- Occupation: Sports medicine physician

Rugby union career
- Position: Centre
Super Rugby
Years	Team	Apps	(Points)
2001–02	Waratahs	13	(25)
National sevens team
Years	Team		Comps
- Australia

Luke Inman (born 27 December 1977) is an Australian former professional rugby union player.

Inman is a nephew of rugby league player Bob McCarthy and elder brother of rugby union player Mitch Inman.

A Waverley College product, Inman made over 100 first-grade appearances with Sydney University, where he studied for a medical degree. He broke into the Waratahs side during the 2001 Super 12 season, taking the centre position vacated by Jason Little, who had left to play in England. By the end of the season, Inman had crossed for five tries, two of which came in an away match against the Hurricanes in New Plymouth. He represented Australia in rugby sevens, including at the 2006 Commonwealth Games in Melbourne, with the team finishing fourth.

Inman has held the chief medical officer roles at NRL clubs Manly, Sydney Roosters and Canterbury.

== See also ==
- List of New South Wales Waratahs players
