= Bill White (rugby union, born 1910) =

Australian rugby player

- Full name: William James White
- Born: 23 June 1910 Coogee, Sydney, Australia
- Died: 31 August 1977 (aged 67)

Rugby union career
- Position: Wing
International career
Years	Team	Apps	(Points)
1928–32	Australia	3	(6)

William James White (23 June 1910 — 31 August 1977) was an Australian rugby union international.

White was born in Sydney and educated at St Joseph's College, Hunters Hill, where he captained the 1st XV.

A Randwick winger, White gained selection for the 1928 New South Wales tour of New Zealand, a mere eight months since leaving school. Two of his tour matches, against NZ XV and NZ Maori, were retrospectively granted test status, due to New South Wales being effectively the country's sole representative team of the time. His third test cap four years later came in Wallabies colours, as a left winger in a win over the All Blacks at the Sydney Cricket Ground.

White, a fireman by profession, died in 1977 at the age of 67.

== See also ==
- List of Australia national rugby union players
