= Bill Cerutti =

Australian rugby union international

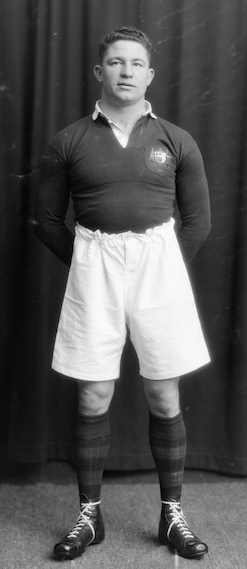
- Full name: William Hector Cerutti
- Born: 7 May 1909 Newtown, Sydney, Australia
- Died: 3 July 1965 (aged 56) Sans Souci, Sydney, Australia

Rugby union career
- Position: Prop
International career
Years	Team	Apps	(Points)
1928–37	Australia	21	(9)

William Hector Cerutti (7 May 1909 – 3 July 1965) was an Australian rugby union international during the 1920s and 1930s. He was inducted into the Rugby Australia Hall of Fame in 2013.

== Biography ==
Cerutti, known as "Wild Bill", was born and raised in Newtown Sydney. His father, an Italian immigrant, had his own woodturning business. Raised in the inner-city, Cerutti was educated at Newtown Public School and Central Technical High School, Ultimo. Initially a soccer player, he got started in grade rugby in 1925 at the YMCA club, making it into the first XV the following year. He made his New South Wales representative debut in 1927.

A front-row forward, Cerutti was capped 21 times for Australia between 1928 and 1937. On the 1928 New South Wales tour of New Zealand, he featured in four matches which were retrospectively given Test status, as Australia's only representative team at that point in history. His actual Wallabies debut didn't come until the 1929 New Zealand tour of Australia. He was a permanent fixture in the Australian team until 1933, with sporadic appearances afterwards, before his international career was ended by his surprise omission from the 1939–40 tour of Britain and Ireland.

Cerutti played a then record 247 first-grade games in Sydney rugby, bettering the previous record held by Cyril Towers. He spent his career with YMCA, Glebe-Balmain, Parramatta, Eastern Suburbs and St. George, before retiring in 1946.

== See also ==
- List of Australia national rugby union players
