= Bill Langenberg =

Australian rugby player (1903–1985)

- Full name: William Harold Langenberg
- Born: 13 August 1903 Woonona, NSW, Australia
- Died: 27 June 1985 (aged 81)

Rugby union career
- Position: Prop
Provincial / State sides
Years	Team	Apps	(Points)
- New South Wales
International career
Years	Team	Apps	(Points)
1928	Australia		

William Harold Langenberg (13 August 1903 – 27 June 1985) was an Australian international rugby union player.

Born in the Wollongong suburb of Woonona, Langenberg was a prop and played his rugby for St. George.

Langenberg toured New Zealand with the NSW Waratahs in 1928, playing in fixtures against Wanganui and Southland. This has retrospectively come to be considered a Wallabies touring squad as the Waratahs were the country's highest level representative team of the time. He also represented NSW against the All Blacks at the SCG in 1932.

In 1941, Langenberg signed with rugby league club Thirroul.

== See also ==
- List of Australia national rugby union players
