= Senirusi Rauqe =

- Born: 19 April 1973 (age 53)

Rugby union career
- Position: Utility back
Super Rugby
Years	Team	Apps	(Points)
1998	Waratahs	1	(0)
National sevens teams
Years	Team		Comps
- Fiji
- Australia
Medal record
Men's rugby sevens
Representing Fiji
Commonwealth Games
Silver medal – second place	1998 Kuala Lumpur	Team competition

Senirusi Rauqe (born 19 April 1973) is a Fijian former professional rugby union player.

A utility back, Rauqe was an international rugby sevens representative for both his country of birth Fiji and Australia, where he was based. He scored the try that secured Fiji the Hong Kong Sevens title in 1998 and claimed a silver medal as a member of the Fiji squad for the 1998 Commonwealth Games in Kuala Lumpur.

Rauqe, known as "Bruce", played in Sydney with Gordon and Manly, as well as several other clubs across New South Wales, in a career which included an appearance for the Waratahs in the 1998 Super 12 season.

== See also ==
- List of New South Wales Waratahs players
