= Mac Ramsay =

- Full name: Kenelm Mackenzie Ramsay
- Born: 27 August 1914 Quirindi, NSW, Australia
- Died: 1 July 1942 (aged 27) at sea, Philippines
- School: Tamworth High School
- Occupation: Salesman

Rugby union career
- Position: Forward
International career
Years	Team	Apps	(Points)
1936–38	Australia	4	(6)

Kenelm Mackenzie "Mac" Ramsay (27 August 1914 — 1 July 1942) was an Australian rugby union international.

Ramsay was born in Quirindi and educated at Tamworth High School.

== Rugby career ==
A versatile forward, Ramsay debuted for Drummoyne in 1935 and made the New South Wales state side in his first season in the top grade, then moved on to Randwick the following year, where he played in two premierships.

Ramsay gained a total of four caps for the Wallabies from 1936 to 1938 and was on the 1939–40 tour of Britain and Ireland which was abandoned due to the war, two days after the team arrived in England.

== World War II ==
Ramsay, enlisting in 1940, served as a Corporal in the 1st Independent Company and was posted to New Ireland. The island was captured by the Japanese in 1942 and soldiers in Ramsay's unit were ordered to retreat. He made it to a ship but was captured by a Japanese destroyer. After being interned at Rabaul, Ramsay was put on the Montevideo Maru which was transporting Australian prisoners of war to Hainan. It was torpedoed en route by the USS Sturgeon, unaware that prisoners were on board. Over 1000 people, including Ramsay, were killed in the sinking of the ship.

== See also ==
- List of Australia national rugby union players
