= Eric Hutchinson (rugby union) =

Australian rugby player (1916–1943)

- Born: Eric Ebsworth Hutchinson; 26 September 1916 Armidale, New South Wales
- Died: 27 January 1943 (aged 26) Coomalie Creek, Northern Territory
- Height: 188
- School: shore & north sydney boys
- University: sydney

Rugby union career
- Position: lock
International career
Years	Team	Apps	(Points)
1937	Wallabies	2	(0)

Eric Ebsworth Hutchinson (26 September 1916 – 27 January 1943) was a rugby union player who represented Australia.

Hutchinson, a lock, was born in Armidale, New South Wales and claimed a total of 2 international rugby caps for Australia. His brother Frank was also an Australian rugby union representative player.
