= Tim Kava =

- Full name: Timothy Paul Kava
- Born: 6 March 1963 (age 63) Innisfail, QLD, Australia
- Height: 6 ft 5 in (196 cm)
- Weight: 242 lb (110 kg)
- School: Waverley College

Rugby union career
- Position: Lock
International career
Years	Team	Apps	(Points)
1989, 1993	Australia		

Timothy Paul Kava (born 6 March 1963) is an Australian former rugby union player.

Kava grew up in the town of Tully in far north Queensland. A rugby league player in his youth, Kava switched to union aged 11 while attending Waverley College in Sydney, where he had three years in the 1st XV. He was a member of the 1981/82 Australian Schools side that went undefeated on a tour of the United Kingdom.

A lock, Kava was an Australian under 21s representative and played most his first-grade rugby with Randwick, winning seven premierships. He won Wallabies selection for their 1989 tour of Canada and France, making his first international appearance in a match against British Columbia. The following year, Kava captained the Emerging Wallabies for a tour Europe. He was also captain of the 1992 Sydney representative team that beat the All Blacks by a record 23-point margin at Penrith Stadium. In 1993, Kava made his second Wallabies squad for a repeat tour of Canada and France, during which he was captain for two uncapped matches. He retired from rugby in 1995.

Kava coached Randwick's first-grade team in the 2005 season.
