= Peter Johnston (rugby union) =

Australian rugby player (born 1946)

- Full name: Peter Stanley Johnston
- Born: 16 August 1946 (age 80) Sydney, Australia
- School: Newington College

Rugby union career
- Position: Prop
Provincial / State sides
Years	Team	Apps	(Points)
- New South Wales
International career
Years	Team	Apps	(Points)
1976	Australia		

Peter Stanley Johnston (born 16 August 1946) is an Australian former international rugby union player.

Johnston was born in Sydney and educated at Newington College.

A prop, Johnston was a Northbridge junior and played his first grade rugby for Northern Suburbs, having started out in their under 21s. He earned representative honours for Sydney in 1967 and the following year made his state debut off the bench for New South Wales against Fiji. In 1975, Johnston was a member of the Northern Suburbs' Shute Shield winning team.

Johnston unsuccessfully trialled for the 1975–76 Wallabies tour, then got his maiden call up for their 1976 home series against Fiji, as an understudy to props David Dunworth and John Meadows. During the second Test at Ballymore, Wallabies coach David Brockhoff at one point instructed Meadows to come off for Johnston, but the injured prop reportedly refused to leave the field and Johnston missed out on a cap.

After retiring, Johnston had a long involvement with the Australian Barbarians as an administrator.

== See also ==
- List of Australia national rugby union players
