= Ted Heinrich =

Australia international rugby union & league player (1940-2013)

- Full name: Edward Lawrence Heinrich
- Born: 25 June 1940 New South Wales, Australia
- Died: 17 September 2013 (aged 73)
- Notable relative: Vince Heinrich (brother)

Rugby union career
- Position: Flanker
International career
Years	Team	Apps	(Points)
1961–63	Australia	10	(6)
- Rugby league career

Playing information
- Position: Lock, Second-row
Club
Years	Team	Pld	T	G	FG	P
1965–68	Parramatta Eels	28	4	0	0	12

Edward Lawrence Heinrich (25 June 1940 — 17 September 2013) was an Australian rugby union international who represented Australia in ten Test matches. He also played rugby league for the Parramatta Eels.

Hailing from Moree, Heinrich was the younger brother of Wallabies forward Vince Heinrich and attended St Joseph's College in Sydney, captaining the school's 1st XV. He was a flanker, who possessed considerable pace, making him also a capable winger in first-grade for Randwick. Capped ten times for the Wallabies between 1961 and 1963, Heinrich debuted against Fiji at Brisbane's Exhibition Ground and twice toured South Africa with the Wallabies.

From 1965 to 1968, Heinrich played rugby league for the Parramatta Eels, as a lock and second-rower.

== See also ==
- List of Australia national rugby union players
