= Colin Shaw (Australian footballer) =

Australian rules footballer

Personal information
- Full name: Colin Shaw
- Born: 24 September 1950 (age 76)
- Original team: Albion
- Height: 191 cm (6 ft 3 in)
- Weight: 80 kg (176 lb)

Playing career^{1}
Years	Club	Games (Goals)
1971–72	Footscray	10 (2)
- ^{1} Playing statistics correct to the end of 1972.

Colin Shaw (born 24 September 1950) is a former Australian rules footballer who played with Footscray in the Victorian Football League (VFL).
