= Ray Love =

Australian rugby league and rugby union player

- Full name: Raymond Thomas Love
- Born: 1934 (age 91–92)

Rugby union career
- Position: Halfback
Amateur team(s)
Years	Team	Apps	(Points)
1953–57	Drummoyne		
Provincial / State sides
Years	Team	Apps	(Points)
1954	New South Wales	1	(0)
- Rugby league career

Playing information
- Position: Halfback
Club
Years	Team	Pld	T	G	FG	P
1958–64	North Sydney	61	15	0	0	45
- Education: Saint Ignatius' College, Riverview
- Father: Jim Love

Raymond Thomas Love (born 1934) is an Australian former rugby league and rugby union player.

Love is the son of New South Wales representative rugby league winger Jimmy Love, who played for Balmain.

Raised in Sydney, Love attended Saint Ignatius' College, Riverview, and gained Combined G.P.S. selection as a rugby union player. He competed in rugby union for Drummoyne after school and in 1954 earned state representative honours at halfback against Queensland. In 1955, Love won the Fairfax Cup as Sydney rugby union's best and fairest.

Love switched to rugby league in 1958 and had seven seasons as a first-grade halfback with North Sydney.
