= Vince Heinrich =

- Born: Vincent William Heinrich; 12 February 1934 Sydney, Australia
- Died: 5 May 2013 (aged 79)
- School: St Joseph's College, Hunters Hill

Rugby union career
- Position: flanker
International career
Years	Team	Apps	(Points)
1954	Wallabies	2	(0)

Vincent William Heinrich (12 February 1934 – 5 May 2013) was an Australian rugby union player. His brother Ted was also an Australian rugby union representative player.

Heinrich, a flanker, was born in Sydney and claimed a total of 2 international rugby caps for Australia. He died on 5 May 2013, at the age of 79.

== Published sources ==
- Howell, Max (2006) Born to Lead – Wallaby Test Captains (2005) Celebrity Books, New Zealand
