= Reg Phipps =

Australian rugby league footballer

- Reg Phipps.1931

Personal information
- Full name: Reginald Teverill Phipps
- Born: 21 July 1906 Paddington, New South Wales, Australia
- Died: 12 June 1976 (aged 69) Concord, New South Wales, Australia

Playing information
- Position: Prop
Club
Years	Team	Pld	T	G	FG	P
1931	St. George	12	3	0	0	9

Reginald Teverill Phipps (1906–1976) was an Australian rugby league footballer who played in the 1930s.

Phipps joined St. George for one season in 1931.

He was previously a state rep rugby union player in 1920's and later coached the Aberdeen, New South Wales rugby club. He returned to the Aberdeen area in 1932, and later served in the AIF in the Second World War.

Phipps died in 1976 at Concord, New South Wales, age 69.
