= Peter Scott (rugby union) =

- Full name: Peter Robert Ian Scott
- Born: 1 January 1940 (age 86) Bombay, British India
- School: Telopea Park, ACT

Rugby union career
- Position: Centre
International career
Years	Team	Apps	(Points)
1962	Australia	2	(8)

Peter Robert Ian Scott (born 1 January 1940) is an Australian former rugby union international.

Scott was born in Bombay and raised in Canberra, attending Telopea Park Secondary School.

A Canberra Royals centre, Scott was a renowned goal-kicker in ACT rugby. He was a representative player for the ACT, NSW and NSW Country. His role in a win for New South Wales over the visiting All Blacks in 1962 saw him selected by the Wallabies for the 1st Test in Brisbane, as outside centre. He kept his place for the 2nd Test in Sydney.

Scott's younger brother Gordon was the first Eastern Suburbs player to appear in 300 grade games.

== See also ==
- List of Australia national rugby union players
