= Travis Hall (rugby union) =

Australian rugby union player (born 1972)

- Born: 19 December 1972 (age 53) Mount Isa, QLD, Australia
- School: Townsville Grammar School

Rugby union career
- Position: Scrum-half
Super Rugby
Years	Team	Apps	(Points)
1998	Waratahs	1	(0)
2000–03	Brumbies	21	(0)

Travis Hall (born 19 December 1972) is an Australian former professional rugby union player.

Born in Mount Isa, Hall played his early senior rugby with Sydney club Drummoyne, before crossing to Eastwood when the team got relegated. He toured the United Kingdom with the New South Wales Waratahs in 1997, but was largely on the sidelines due to a broken ankle suffered against London Irish. Over the next two seasons, Hall remained on the fringes of the side, behind Chris Whitaker and Sam Payne as the preferred scrum-half.

Hall signed with the ACT Brumbies in 1999 after being let go by the Waratahs. The understudy to George Gregan, Hall was at the Brumbies for four seasons, making 21 appearances in the Super 12. He contributed 13-points off his boot in their injury-time loss to the 2001 British Lions and was on the bench for the 2001 Super 12 grand final win.

== See also ==
- List of ACT Brumbies players
- List of New South Wales Waratahs players
