= Paul Johnson (rugby union) =

Australian rugby union player (1924–1995)

- Full name: Adrian Paul Johnson
- Born: 6 December 1924 Mullumbimby, NSW, Australia
- Died: 29 October 1995 (aged 70)
- Notable relative: Brian Johnson (brother)

Rugby union career
- Position: Fly-half / Centre
International career
| Years | Team | Apps | (Points) |
| 1946 | Australia | 2 | (0) |

Adrian Paul Johnson (6 December 1924 – 29 October 1995) was an Australian rugby union international.

Born in Mullumbimby, Johnson was the 1st XV captain at St Joseph's College and played his early first-grade rugby for Eastern Suburbs, debuting in the 1943 Shute Shield grand final loss to Manly. He left the club the next year to join Sydney University, where he was studying dentistry. In 1945, Johnson starred as a fly-half in University's premiership team.

Johnson was capped twice for the Wallabies on the 1946 tour of New Zealand, against the All Blacks in Dunedin and NZ Maori in Hamilton, playing out of position at inside centre. Further selection eluded him, although Johnson was considered likely to make the 1947–48 tour of Britain and France had he not chosen to prioritise his studies.

== See also ==
- List of Australia national rugby union players
