= William Crackenthorpe =

William Crackenthorpe may refer to:

- William Crackenthorpe I, MP for Westmorland (UK Parliament constituency) and Appleby (UK Parliament constituency)
- William Crackenthorpe II, MP for Appleby (UK Parliament constituency)
