= Harold Primrose =

- Full name: Harold Edwin Primrose
- Born: 9 October 1910 Carlton, NSW, Australia
- Died: 8 February 1960 (aged 49)

Rugby union career
- Position: Fly–half
Provincial / State sides
Years	Team	Apps	(Points)
- New South Wales
International career
Years	Team	Apps	(Points)
1931	Australia		

Harold Edwin Primrose (9 October 1910 – 8 February 1960) was an Australian international rugby union player.

Primrose was born in the Sydney suburb of Carlton and attended Manly Public School.

A fly–half, Primrose got his international opportunity in 1931 when he won a place on the Wallabies' touring squad for New Zealand. He was selected from Manly. As Tom Lawton was unavailable to tour, Primrose started the opening three fixtures as Wallabies fly–half, but had fallen out of favour by the time they played the All Blacks, with utility Jack Steggall preferred. He never received another call up, but continued with Manly for several seasons and became club captain.

== See also ==
- List of Australia national rugby union players
