= Watty Friend =

Australia international rugby union player (1898-1983)

- Born: Walter Smale Friend; 19 September 1898 Burwood, New South Wales, Australia
- Died: 20 February 1983 (aged 84)
- School: The King's School

Rugby union career
Senior career
Years	Team	Apps	(Points)
	Glebe-Balmain	56	
Provincial / State sides
Years	Team	Apps	(Points)
1920-23	Waratahs	10	
International career
Years	Team	Apps	(Points)
1920–23	Waratahs	10	(0)

Walter Smale "Watty" Friend (19 September 1898 – 20 February 1983) was an Australian rugby union player, a state and national representative lock forward in the 1920s. Ten of his New South Wales state appearances have since been decreed as Test matches by the Australian Rugby Union and Friend, who led the side in three such matches in 1923, was therefore a captain of the Australian national team.

== Rugby career ==
Following his time at The King's School in Sydney, Friend starting his club rugby at the Glebe-Balmain club alongside his older brother R.M Friend. He was selected in a New South Wales 2nd XV who met a visiting New Zealand All Blacks side and when he impressed in that performance he was selected in a Sydney Metropolitan side and the state representative side to play those same tourists. With no Queensland Rugby Union administration or competition in place from 1919 to 1929, the New South Wales Waratahs were the top Australian representative rugby union side of the period and a number of their 1920s fixtures played against full international opposition were decreed in 1986 as official Test matches.

In 1921 he figured in three matches for New South Wales against the visiting Springboks. Howell notes that Friends was one of the Waratahs' top players. In 1922 he appeared in all three matches again when the All Blacks visited Sydney, with second and third matches wins resulting in a rare series victory of those days to the Waratahs over the All Blacks. In 1923 New Zealand Māori rugby union team visited and Friend was honoured with the captaincy of New South Wales in a three match series in which the Waratahs were undefeated.

Friend, claimed a total of ten international rugby caps for Australia all of them played at home in Sydney. His record as national captain is unblemished with three appearances and three wins.

Preceded by Darby Loudon	Australian national rugby union captain 1923	Succeeded by Billy Sheehan
