= Oscar Dean =

Australian cricketer

Personal information
- Born: 30 April 1886; Windsor, New South Wales, Australia
- Died: 11 May 1962 (aged 76); Windsor, New South Wales, Australia
- Source: ESPNcricinfo, 26 December 2016

Oscar Dean (30 April 1886 – 11 May 1962) was an Australian cricketer. He played one first-class match for New South Wales in 1907/08.

== See also ==
- List of New South Wales representative cricketers
