= Luke Milton =

Australian rugby league footballer

Personal information
- Full name: Luke Milton
- Born: 18 March 1982 (age 44) Paddington, New South Wales, Australia

Playing information

Rugby league
- Position: Wing, Centre
Club
Years	Team	Pld	T	G	FG	P
2001–02	Sydney Roosters	8	1	5	0	14
2003	Wests Tigers	1	1	0	0	4
	Total	9	2	5	0	18

Rugby union
Club
Years	Team	Pld	T	G	FG	P
2004–07	NSW Waratahs	0	0	0	0	0
2008	New York Athletic Club RFC	0	0	0	0	0
	Total	0	0	0	0	0
- As of 16 Jul 2021

Luke Milton (born 18 March 1982) is an Australian former rugby league and rugby union footballer.

He is also a celebrity trainer on Revenge Body with Khloé Kardashian.

== Background ==
Milton was born in Paddington, New South Wales, Australia

== Playing career ==
Milton, a Wing, Centre, played in the National Rugby League (NRL) for the Sydney Roosters club. Milton came through the Roosters lower grades and represented Australia at a junior level before making his first grade debut in 2001. He had a season at the Wests Tigers club in the 2003 season before switching rugby codes to play for the NSW Waratahs in rugby union.

He played with New York Athletic Club (NYAC) Rugby in the United States Super League in 2008 and led the team to a national championship, winning the title game in sudden death with a 55-meter penalty.

Luke attended Lucas Heights Community School in his early high school years and attended Bangor Primary.
