= Nigel Waugh =

Australian rugby league player

- Born: 13 October 1975 (age 51)

Rugby union career
- Position: Three-quarter
Provincial / State sides
| Years | Team | Apps | (Points) |
| 2000 | Waratahs | 3 | (0) |
- Rugby league career

Playing information
- Position: Wing
Club
| Years | Team | Pld | T | G | FG | P |
|---|---|---|---|---|---|---|
| 1995–97 | South Sydney | 4 | 0 | 0 | 0 | 0 |

Nigel Waugh (born 13 October 1975) is an Australian former rugby league and rugby union player.

A Coogee-Wombats junior, Waugh was an occasional first-grade winger for South Sydney from 1995 to 1997, before switching in 1999 to rugby union, a sport he had never previously played.

Waugh played his rugby union for Randwick as a three-quarter. He got signed by the New South Wales Waratahs in 2000 and was part of their side for that year's Ricoh National Championship.
