= Brian Johnson (rugby union) =

- Full name: Brian Bernard Johnson
- Born: 29 April 1930 Coffs Harbour, Australia
- Died: 25 July 1966 (aged 36) Goroka, New Guinea
- Notable relative: Paul Johnson (brother)

Rugby union career
- Position: Flanker / No. 8
International career
Years	Team	Apps	(Points)
1952–55	Australia	9	(6)

Brian Bernard Johnson (29 April 1930 - 25 July 1966) was an Australian rugby union international.

Johnson, born in Coffs Harbour, was the younger brother of Wallabies centre Paul Johnson. He attended St Mary's Cathedral College in Sydney and made his first-grade debut for Gordon in 1949, winning a premiership that season.

Capped nine times for the Wallabies, Johnson debuted in 1952 as a flanker in a home series against Fiji. He had a large role in a win over the Springboks in Cape Town on the 1953 tour of South Africa, which was their first post war loss. Starting the match at number eight, Johnson had to play a period on the wing to cover for the injured John Solomon, with his performance hailed in the press. He also twice toured New Zealand during his Wallabies career.

Johnson, who moved to New Guinea during the 1950s, died in Goroka at the age of 36. He had been running a coffee plantation on the island and was also heavily involved in local rugby league, captain-coaching the Goroka team.

== See also ==
- List of Australia national rugby union players
