= Frank Hutchinson (rugby union, born 1917) =

- Full name: Francis Ebsworth Hutchinson
- Born: 27 December 1917 Armidale, NSW, Australia
- Died: 4 January 1943 (aged 25) over Uden, Netherlands

Rugby union career
- Position: Lock
International career
Years	Team	Apps	(Points)
1936–38	Australia	4	(0)

Francis Ebsworth Hutchinson (27 December 1917 — 4 January 1943) was an Australian rugby union international.

Born in Armidale, Hutchinson was educated at North Sydney Boys High School and Sydney Church of England Grammar School, after which he attended the University of Sydney. He played first-grade for Sydney University.

Hutchinson, younger brother of Wallaby Eric, was capped first, appearing in two Tests in his debut first-grade season, as a lock on the 1936 tour of New Zealand. He gained a further two caps in the 1938 home Tests against the All Blacks.

During World War II, Hutchinson served in the Royal Australian Air Force. In January, 1943, he was one of seven crew members killed when his Lancaster was intercepted and shot down over the Dutch town Uden, on the way to a bombing raid on Essen, Germany. His brother Eric lost his life in an accidental mid-air collision 23 days later.

== See also ==
- List of Australia national rugby union players
