= Munro Fraser =

Australia international rugby union player

- Born: 17 April 1879 North Shore, Auckland, New Zealand
- Died: 14 February 1952 (aged 72) Sydney, NSW, Australia
- Weight: 83 kg (182 lb)

Rugby union career
- Positions: Wing-forward; Forward
Provincial / State sides
Years	Team	Apps	(Points)
1905–1906	Auckland		
1909–1911	New South Wales		
International career
Years	Team	Apps	(Points)
1912	Australia		

Munro Fraser (17 April 1879 – 14 February 1952) was an Australian international rugby union player. Before moving to Australia, he played representative rugby for Auckland in his native New Zealand.

== Biography ==
Fraser was born in New Zealand, on Auckland's North Shore, on 17 April 1879, the son of John Munro Fraser and Anne Fraser. He worked as a miner in Waihi, and played representative rugby for Auckland as a wing-forward. He was a member of the Auckland team when they lifted the Ranfurly Shield from Wellington in 1905. He moved to Australia in 1907.

Known by the nickname "Money", Fraser was a strong-scrummaging forward for Sydney club Glebe and represented New South Wales in several fixtures. In 1912, Fraser gained an international call-up at the advanced age of 33, as a member of Australia's tour of North America. He picked up an injury in an early tour match against UC Berkeley and was sidelined for the remainder of the trip.

Fraser served with the Australian Imperial Force (AIF) during World War I and coached an AIF XV that toured England.

Fraser died at Prince Henry Hospital, Sydney, on 14 February 1952, at the age of 72 years.

== See also ==
- List of Australia national rugby union players
