= Kevin O'Hara (rugby union) =

- Full name: Kevin John O'Hara
- Born: 4 August 1953 (age 73) Sydney, NSW, Australia
- School: St Edmund's College; St Joseph's College
- University: University of Sydney

Rugby union career
- Position: Outside back
International career
Years	Team	Apps	(Points)
1974	Australia		

Kevin John O'Hara (born 4 August 1953) is an Australian former international rugby union player.

Born in Sydney, O'Hara spent his early years in Canberra, where he attended St Edmund's College. He finished his secondary schooling back in Sydney at St Joseph's College, Hunters Hill, where he had two seasons in the 1st XV and earned NSW Schools representative honours, before pursuing an engineering degree at the University of Sydney.

O'Hara, an outside back, had seven seasons with Sydney University during the 1970s and was often given the goal-kicking duties, with his fluid technique described by former Wales coaching director Ray Williams as amongst the best he had seen. It was these kicking abilities that earned him a Wallabies call up in 1974, as a back up for Paul McLean in two Test matches the visiting All Blacks, for which he spent the entirety on the bench.

== See also ==
- List of Australia national rugby union players
