= Harold Herd (rugby union) =

- Born: Harold Vincent Herd; 12 December 1909 Coffs Harbour, New South Wales
- Died: 11 April 1962 (aged 52)

Rugby union career
- Position: centre
International career
Years	Team	Apps	(Points)
1931	Wallabies	1	(0)

Harold Vincent Herd (12 December 1909 – 11 April 1962) was a rugby union player who represented Australia.

Herd, a centre, was born in Coffs Harbour, New South Wales and claimed 1 international rugby cap for Australia.
