= Tom Smith (rugby union, born 1893) =

- Born: Thomas Shaftesbury Smith c. 1893
- Died: c. 1965 (aged 71–72)

Rugby union career
- Position: prop
International career
| Years | Team | Apps | (Points) |
| 1921–25 | Wallabies | 12 | (3) |

Thomas Shaftesbury Smith (c. 1893 – c. 1965) was a rugby union player who represented Australia.

Smith, a prop, claimed a total of 12 international rugby caps for Australia.
