= Marc Stcherbina =

- Born: Marc Stcherbina; 7 December 1976 (age 49) Sydney, New South Wales, Australia
- Height: 6 ft 0 in (183 cm)
- Weight: 14 st 7 lb (92 kg; 203 lb)
- School: Sydney Boys High School

Rugby union career
- Position: Centre
Senior career
Years	Team	Apps	(Points)
1998–2002	NSW Waratahs	42	(65)
2002–04	Biarritz	32	(20)
2004–06	Northampton	29	(5)
2006–08	Cardiff Blues	52	(40)
2008–09	Newport GD	8	(5)
International career
Years	Team	Apps	(Points)
- Australia A
National sevens team
Years	Team		Comps
- Australia 7's
Medal record
Men's rugby sevens
Representing Australia
Commonwealth Games
Bronze medal – third place	1998 Kuala Lumpur	Team competition

Marc Stcherbina (born 7 December 1976, in Sydney) is an Australian retired rugby union player who last played for Newport Gwent Dragons. He was educated at Sydney Boys High School, and then University of New South Wales. He also played for the Waratahs, Northampton, and Cardiff Blues.

He captained Australian schoolboys, and is one of the few players to make three Australian schoolboy teams and captained the team in 1994 and 1995. He then represented his country at under 19 and u21 level, and the Australia 7's and Australia A . He represented Australia at the 1998 Commonwealth Games in Kuala Lumpur, winning a bronze medal, and then in the 2002 Commonwealth Games in Manchester.

He played most of his Super 12 Rugby on the Wing for the NSW Waratahs. In his last season The Waratahs came 3rd in the Super 12. In 2002, he accepted a 2-year deal with French side Biarritz where he switched to centre. he then decided to move to Northampton for the 04–05 season. He started 29 games for them that season, the most appearances of any player that season.

Due to Carlos Spencer joining Northampton, Guinness Premiership rules allowed only one overseas player on the pitch at a time, forcing Stcherbina to move to Cardiff Blues where he enjoyed 3 seasons earning 52 caps for the Welsh side. He moved to Newport Gwent Dragons for the 2008–09 season. However, in December 2008 Stcherbina suffered a serious neck injury playing for the Dragons in Toulouse, and did not play for the rest of the season. Despite making a good recovery, he announced his retirement on medical advice on 9 June 2009.

Recently, Stcherbina has moved into coaching. He is currently Director of Rugby and Head Coach of Santa Monica Rugby Club in the United States. and has assisted with the coaching of the USA Maccabiah, USA u20s, and USA Girls' High School teams.
