= John Crakanthorp =

Australia international rugby union player (1901–1983)

Dr John Saxon Crakanthorp
- Born: John Saxon Crakanthorp; 12 November 1901 Bathurst, New South Wales
- Died: 4 April 1983 (aged 91) Brighton, Victoria
- School: Fort Street
- University: Sydney University
- Occupation: Doctor

Rugby union career
- Position: fullback
International career
Years	Team	Apps	(Points)
1923	Wallabies	1	(0)

John Saxon Crakanthorp (12 November 1901 – 4 April 1983) was a rugby union player who represented Australia.

Crakanthorp, a fullback, was born in a suburb of Sydney and claimed 1 international rugby cap for Australia.
