= 1928 New South Wales rugby union tour of New Zealand =

Summary
P	W	D	L
Total
10	5	0	5
Test match
3	1	0	2
Opponent
P	W	D	L
New Zealand XV
3	1	0	2

The 1928 Waratahs tour of New Zealand was a collection of rugby union games undertaken by the New South Wales Teams against invitational and national teams of New Zealand.

The Queensland Rugby Union had collapsed in 1919 and would not be reborn until 1929 leaving the New South Wales Rugby Union to administer the game in Australia at the national representative level. In 1928 the New South Wales side toured New Zealand three years after the previous tour over the Tasman Sea and only few mount after the tour of the British Isles, France and Canada.

== Matches ==
Scores and results list New South Wales' points tally first.

Opposing Team	For	Against	Date	Venue	Status
Auckland	19	8	25 August 1928	Eden Park, Auckland	Tour match
Wanganui	20	16	31 August 1928	Cooks Gardens, Wanganui	Tour match
Hawke's Bay	19	6	1 September 1928	McLean Park, Napier	Tour match
New Zealand XV	12	15	5 September 1928	Athletic Park, Wellington	Test match
New Zealand XV	14	16	8 September 1928	Carisbrook, Dunedin	Test match
Southland	28	31	12 September 1928	Rugby Park, Invercargill	Tour match
New Zealand XV	11	8	15 September 1928	Lancaster Park, Christchurch	Test match
Marlborough	27	15	19 September 1928	Lansdowne Park, Blenheim	Tour match
New Zealand Māori	8	9	22 September 1928	Athletic Park, Wellington	Tour match
Wairarapa	10	17	26 September 1928	Memorial Park, Masterton	Tour match
