= Colin Shaw (rugby union, born 1902) =

- Born: Colin Hedderick Shaw c. 1902 Edinburgh
- Died: 28 August 1976 Sydney

Rugby union career
- Position: lock
International career
Years	Team	Apps	(Points)
1925	Wallabies	3	(0)

Colin Hedderick Shaw (c. 1902 – 28 August 1976) was a rugby union player who represented Australia.

Shaw, a lock, was born in Edinburgh and claimed a total of 3 international rugby caps for Australia.
