= Clive Bondfield =

- Born: Clive D. Bondfield c. 1899

Rugby union career
- Position: wing
International career
Years	Team	Apps	(Points)
1925	Wallabies	1	(0)

Clive D. Bondfield (born c. 1899) was a rugby union player who represented Australia.

Bondfield, a wing, claimed one international rugby cap for Australia.
