= Jackie Beith =

Australia international rugby union player

- Born: Bruce McNeil Beith; 28 September 1893 Mudgee, New South Wales
- Died: September 1961 (aged 67–68)
- University: University of Sydney

Rugby union career
- Position: fullback
International career
Years	Team	Apps	(Points)
1914–20	Wallabies	4	(0)

Bruce McNeil "Jackie" Beith (28 September 1893 – September 1961) was a rugby union player who represented Australia.

Beith, a fullback, was born in Mudgee, New South Wales and claimed a total of 4 international rugby caps for Australia.
