= 1925 New South Wales rugby union tour of New Zealand =

Summary
P	W	D	L
Total
10	7	0	3
Test match
1	0	0	1
Opponent
P	W	D	L
New Zealand XV
1	0	0	1

The 1925 Waratahs tour of New Zealand was a series of rugby union games undertaken by the New South Wales Teams against invitational and national teams of New Zealand.

The Queensland Rugby Union had collapsed in 1919 and would not be reborn until 1929 leaving the New South Wales Rugby Union to administer the game in Australia at the national representative level. In 1925 the New South Wales side toured New Zealand

Previously the All Blacks visited New South Wales in the 1925 tour.

== Matches ==
Scores and results list New South Wales' points tally first.

Opposing Team	For	Against	Date	Venue	Status
Manawhenua / Wellington	20	8	22 August 1925	Palmerston North Showgrounds, Palmerston North	Tour match
West Coast-Buller	32	14	26 August 1925	Rugby Park, Greymouth	Tour match
Otago / Southland	22	17	29 August 1925	Carisbrook, Dunedin	Tour match
Canterbury	13	22	3 September 1925	Lancaster Park, Christchurch	Tour match
Wanganui / Taranaki	13	11	5 September 1925	Pukekura Park, New Plymouth	Tour match
Wairarapa / Bush	38	8	9 September 1925	Memorial Park, Masterton	Tour match
Poverty Bay / East Coast	11	3	12 September 1925	Rugby Park in Gisborne	Tour match
Waikato / King Country	19	16	16 September 1925	Taumarunui Domain, Taumarunui	Tour match
New Zealand XV	10	36	19 September 1925	Eden Park, Auckland	Test match
North Auckland	6	22	23 September 1925	Okara Park, Whangārei	Tour match
