= 1939–40 Australia rugby union tour of Britain and Ireland =

- Tour captain: Vay Wilson
Summary
P	W	D	L
Total
1	1	0	0
Test match
0	0	0	0
Opponent
P	W	D	L
Scotland
0	0	0	0
Ireland
0	0	0	0
Wales
0	0	0	0
England
0	0	0	0
France
0	0	0	0

The 1939–40 Australia rugby union tour of Britain and Ireland commenced with the departure of the Australian squad by ship from Sydney, Australia on 21 July 1939. The team is remembered as The Second Wallabies, however their tour was prematurely ended by Britain's declaration of war on Nazi Germany just two days after the team arrived in the UK on 2 September 1939. The side played only one match - at Bombay in India during their return journey. The tour was the first full scale trip to the British Isles attempted by the Australian national side since the First Wallaby tour of 1908 and the 1927/8 Waratah Tour (which has retrospectively been accorded national representative status). It was followed by the Third Wallaby Tour of 1947/8.

== Touring party ==
The side was captained by Vay Wilson. The Manager was Dr W. F. Matthews and the Secretary was Mr J. Noseda.
