= 1927–28 New South Wales rugby union tour of the British Isles, France and Canada =

- Tour captain: Johnnie Wallace
Summary
P	W	D	L
Total
37	31	1	5
Test match
5	3	0	2
Opponent
P	W	D	L
Ireland
1	1	0	0
Wales
1	1	0	0
Scotland
1	0	0	1
England
1	0	0	1
France
1	1	0	0

Between July 1927 and March 1928 the New South Wales Waratahs, the top Australian representative rugby union side of the time, conducted a world tour encompassing Ceylon, Britain, France and Canada on which they played five Tests and twenty-six minor tour matches.

The Queensland Rugby Union had collapsed in 1919 and would not be reborn until 1929 leaving the New South Wales Rugby Union to administer the game in Australia at the national representative level. Just prior to the start of the Australian 1927 season an invitation from the International Rugby Board arrived in Sydney requesting a New South Wales side tour Great Britain to play Tests against the Home Nations.

In 1986 the Australian Rugby Union decreed the five full-internationals played on the tour as official Test matches.

== The squad and its captain ==
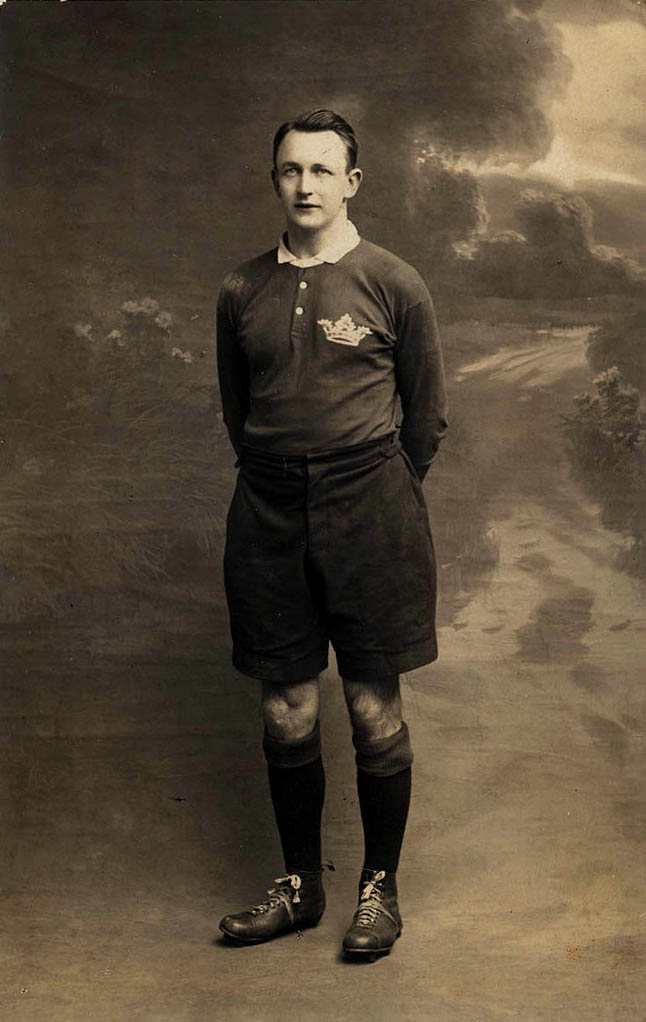
Johnnie Wallace, captain of the tour

A squad of 29 players was selected comprising twenty-eight New South Welshmen and one Queenslander in the great fly-half Tom Lawton, Snr who had been forced to come to Sydney to continue his career due to the absence of rugby in Brisbane. The side was captained by Arthur Cooper "Johnnie" Wallace who from Sydney University had earnt a Rhodes scholarship to Oxford in 1922 and whilst there had represented Scotland in nine Tests between 1923 and 1926.

The selection of Wallace as captain is referred to by Howell as "a masterstoke". He was well known in Britain through his Oxford and Scotland association, was an experienced and naturally gifted player, a strong tactician and a great influence on the younger players. On the nine-month tour, the Australians won 24, lost 5 and drew 2 of the matches they played and returned having established an international reputation for playing fair and attacking rugby.

== Tour itinerary ==
The squad left Sydney by train on 22nd July 1927 bound for Melbourne. They played a game on the afternoon of their arrival in Melbourne against a Victorian invitation XV which was won 19–9. They set off in Ormonde from Melbourne on 26th July for Adelaide where they had a one-day stop.

By 10th August Ormonde had arrived in Colombo where they were the guests of the Colombo Rugby Union and the tourists played that day against an All Ceylon XV in front of a crowd of 5,000 spectators. They set sail from Ceylon on 11th August. Ormonde passed through the Suez Canal and the Straits of Messina and a disembarkation was made at Naples to enable a visit to Pompeii. Another stop was made at Toulon before arriving at Gibraltar on 28th August and Plymouth by the end of August.

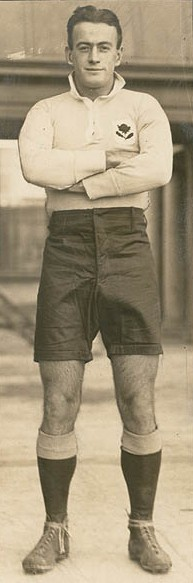
Cyril Towers, tour diarist

The squad had two weeks preparation on land at Teignmouth in Devon before the first tour match against Devon and Cornwall on 17th September. The tourists then relocated to Wales where matches were played at Newport, Swansea and Cardiff.

At Oxford the Waratahs suffered their first defeat, 0–3 against a varsity side, although they won the next encounter against Cambridge. Matches were also played at Liverpool, Newcastle and Coventry before they sailed to Dublin. The Waratahs won the first Test of the tour 5–3 against Ireland at Lansdowne Road on 12th November.

Two weeks later the tourists met Wales at Cardiff Arms where they triumphed 18–8. From Cardiff they travelled to Scotland where matches were played at Glasgow, Melrose, Aberdeen and the Test loss at Edinburgh. The tourists made day trips to the Lochs, Lomond, Long and Gyll and where shown over the King's castle at Balmoral. Back in Edinburgh castles were visited by day with dinners and theatre parties attended at night.

The party travelled to London for New Year and were shown over the Houses of Parliament by Lord Donoughmore, the Secretary of the House of Lords and James Whitley, the Speaker of the House of Commons. They were presented to the Prince of Wales at St James's Palace and to the King at Sandringham House. At Sandringham they accompanied the King through the woods on a shooting expedition after lunch and were presented to Her Majesty, Queen Mary at afternoon tea.

Later the Australians were flattered by a personal invitation to take tea at the Piccadilly residence of the Duke and Duchess of York where they met the infant Princess Elizabeth. Three other days were spent in the company of officers of the Army, Air Force and Navy culminating in a tour of the Royal Navy facilities at Portsmouth where they were of shown over the workings of the recently launched Australian submarines HMS Otway and HMS Oxley, the museum piece HMS Victory and the royal yacht Victoria and Albert.

Two days after the Test loss at Twickenham the squad left for France, spending a night in Paris before journeying to Bordeaux. There against a selected provincial side the Waratahs suffered the most convincing defeat of the tour with the locals taking an early lead and holding on to a 19–10 victory. Then followed a match in Toulouse against a side representing south-western France in which the visitors prevailed.

Back in Paris, the tourists were entertained and shown the city's splendour before meeting the France national side at Stade Colombes in the final Test match of the tour in front of a crowd of 40,000 with 2,000 gendarmes stationed around the enclosure to keep in check the emotions of the enthusiasts. From Paris the squad crossed the channel and departed from Liverpool in Melita for Canada. They travelled by train from coast to coast with stops at Montreal, Toronto, Banff and Sicamous. Arriving in Vancouver in late February 1928 the squad spent twelve days and played three exhibition matches against varsity and club sides.

In March 1928 they boarded Aorangi in Vancouver to commence the final leg home with stops in Honolulu, Suva and Auckland before arriving in Sydney by month's end, a full nine months after first setting out.

== Touring party ==
- Manager: E.G. Shaw
- Captain: Johnnie Wallace
- Vice-Captain: Charles Fox

=== Squad ===
Name	Tests	Club	Career caps	Tour apps	Position	Pts
A. W. Ross	5	Sydney University	20	29	Full back	
A. J. A. Bowers	1	Eastern Suburbs, Randwick	7	9	Three-quarter	
J. B. Egan	0	Eastern Suburbs	0	7	Three-quarter	
E. E. Ford	5	Glebe-Balmain	7	21	Three-quarter	
G. C.Gordon	0	Western Suburbs, Newcastle YMCA	1	8	Three-quarter	
S. C. King	4	Western Suburbs	14	19	Three-quarter	
W. H. Mann	0	Sydney University	0	7	Three-quarter	
W. B. J. Sheehan	2	Sydney University	18	12	Three-quarter	
C. H. T. Towers	3	Randwick	19	29	Three-quarter	
A. C. Wallace (c)	5	Sydney University	8	22	Three-quarter	
J. L. Duncan	0	Randwick	1	8	Half-back	
S. J. Malcolm	3	Cook's Hill Surf Club, Newcastle YMCA, Manly	18	11	Half-back	
F. W. Meagher	2	Randwick	8	12	Half-back	
T. Lawton	5	Sydney University, Western Suburbs	14	27	Half-back	
J. G. Blackwood	5	Eastern Suburbs	21	23	Forward	
G. V. Bland	0	Manly	9	4	Forward	
M. R. Blair	1	Western Suburbs	3	7	Forward	
J. W. P. Breckenridge	5	Glebe-Balmain	11	26	Forward	
A. N. Finlay	5	Sydney University	12	24	Forward	
J. A. Ford	4	Glebe-Balmain	11	25	Forward	
C. L. Fox (v.c.)	1	Northern Suburbs	17	12	Forward	
E. N. Greatorex	2	Newcastle YMCA	8	14	Forward	
P. B. Judd	4	Western Suburbs	11	24	Forward	
G. P. Storey	5	Western Suburbs	8	20	Forward	
A. N. Tancred	3	Glebe-Balmain	3	16	Forward	
J. L. Tancred	2	Glebe-Balmain	2	16	Forward	
K. Tarleton	0	Newcastle YMCA	2	9	Forward	
E. J. Thorn	0	Manly	15	13	Forward	
H. F. Woods	4	Newcastle YMCA	8	19	Forward	

== Matches of the tour ==
The "Exhibition Matches" are not classed as important as the "Tour matches". They are listed on the tour but the starting line-ups are not counted in the players stats.

Test matches

#	Date	Rival	Venue	City	Country	Score
1	17 Sep 1927	Devon and Cornwall	Rectory Field	Devonport	England	30–3
2	22 Sep 1927	Newport	Rodney Parade	Newport	Wales	20–3
3	24 Sep 1927	Neath and Aberavon	Talbot Athletic Ground	Port Talbot	Wales	24–5
4	28 Sep 1927	Abertillery and Cross Keys	Abertillery Park	Abertillery	Wales	13–3
5	6 Oct 1927	Swansea	St. Helen's	Swansea	Wales	11–0
6	8 Oct 1927	East Midlands	Franklin's Gardens	Northampton	England	16–12
7	8 Oct 1927	Yorkshire and Cumberland	Lidget Green	Bradford	England	9–3
8	12 Oct 1927	Glasgow District	Old Anniesland Ground	Glasgow	Scotland	10–0
9	15 Oct 1927	South of Scotland	The Greenyards	Melrose	Scotland	36–0
10	19 Oct 1927	North of Scotland	St Machar Ground	Aberdeen	Scotland	21–15
11	22 Oct 1927	London	Twickenham Stadium	London	England	0–0
12	27 Oct 1927	University of Oxford	Iffley Road	Oxford	England	0–3
13	29 Oct 1927	Leicestershire RU	Welford Road Stadium	Leicester	England	20–8
14	2 Nov 1927	Cambridge University	Grange Road	Cambridge	England	18–11
15	5 Nov 1927	Combined Services	Twickenham Stadium	London	England	13–11
16	12 Nov 1927	Ireland	Lansdowne Road	Dublin	Ireland	5–3
17	16 Nov 1927	Ulster	Ravenhill	Belfast	Northern Ireland	11–3
18	19 Nov 1927	Northumberland and Durham	Gosforth Greyhound Stadium	Gosforth	England	14–9
19	26 Nov 1927	Wales	Cardiff Arms Park	Cardiff	Wales	18–8
20	29 Nov 1927	Llanelli RFC	Stradey Park	Llanelli	Wales	24–14
21	3 Dec 1927	Cardiff RFC	Cardiff Arms Park	Cardiff	Wales	15–9
22	8 Dec 1927	Pontypool RFC	Pontypool Park	Pontypool	Wales	3–6
23	10 Dec 1928	Lancashire and Cheshire	Birkenhead Park	Birkenhead	England	29–11
24	17 Dec 1927	Scotland	Murrayfield	Edinburgh	Scotland	8–10
25	22 Dec 1927	Warwickshire and North Midlands	Barkers Butts Lane	Coventry	England	8–5
26	31 Dec 1927	Gloucester and Somersetshires	Memorial Stadium	Bristol	England	13–4
27	7 Jan 1928	England	Twickenham Stadium	London	England	11–18
28	12 Jan 1928	South of France	Parc Lescure	Bordeaux	France	10–19
29	15 Jan 1928	Midi	Stade Ernest-Wallon	Toulouse	France	11–3
30	22 Jan 1928	France	Stade Colombes	Paris	France	11–8
30	29 Jan 1928	London team	Twickenham Stadium	London	England	0–0

=== Exhibition matches ===
Scores and results list New South Wales's points tally first.

Date	Opponent	Location	Result	Score
23 July 1927	Victoria	Motordrome, Melbourne	Won	19–9
10 August 1927	Ceylon	CH & FC Grounds, Colombo	Won	23–3
1 September 1927	Teignmouth	Teignmouth	Won	38–3
7 September 1927	Plymouth Albion	Plymouth	Won	21–11
25 February 1928	Vancouver Representative XV	Vancouver	Won	9–6
29 February 1928	Varsity	Vancouver	Won	55–3
3 March 1928	Vancouver Representative XV	Vancouver	Won	17–0

== Test matches ==
=== Ireland ===
12 November 1927

Ireland	3–5	New South Wales
Pen: Ganly (1/1)	Report	Try: Wallace; Con: Lawton (1/1)

Lansdowne Road, Dublin
Attendance: 25,000
Referee: A.W. Angus (Scotland)

Team details

Ireland	New South Wales

Arthur Douglas	FB	Alex Ross
Jim Ganly	W	Allen Bowers
Maurice Atkinson	C	Johnnie Wallace (c)
George Stephenson (c)	C	Cyril Towers
Henry Stephenson	W	Eric Ford
Eugene Davy	FH	Tom Lawton
Mark Sugden	SH	Wally Meagher
Charles Hanrahan	P	Bruce Judd
Jimmy Farrell	H	Jock Blackwood
Jim McVicker	P	Harry Woods
Charles Payne	L	Geoff Storey
Hugh McVicker	L	Huck Finlay
Theodore Pike	F	Arnold Tancred
Allan Buchanan	F	Wylie Breckenridge
William Browne	N8	Jack Ford

Notes:

- Towers described the match as "an evenly contested and arduous struggle ...lacking the brilliance of the other internationals".
- The match would ultimately be recognised as the first ever Test between Ireland and an Australian side.

=== Wales ===
26 November 1927

Wales	8–18	New South Wales
Try: Finch; Lewis; Con: Rees (1/2)	Report	Try: Wallace (2); King; Sheehan; Con: Lawton (3/4)

Cardiff Arms Park, Cardiff
Attendance: 35,000
Referee: D. Helliwell (England)

Team details

Wales	New South Wales

Tommy Rees	FB	Alex Ross
Dan Jones	W	Eric Fordd
John Roberts	C	Billy Sheehan
Roy Jones	C	Syd King
Ernie Finch	W	Johnnie Wallace (c)
Windsor Lewis	FH	Tom Lawton
Tal Harris	SH	Wally Meagher
David Jenkins	P	Bruce Judd
Lonza Bowdler	H	Jock Blackwood
Ned Jenkins	P	Harry Woods
Harry Phillips	L	Geoff Storey
Gus Broughton	L	Huck Finlay
Iorweth Jones	F	Arnold Tancred
Tom Hollingdale	F	Wylie Breckenridge
Ivor Jones (c)	N8	Jack Ford

=== Scotland ===
17 December 1927

Scotland	10–8	New South Wales
Try: Graham; Welsh; Con: Drysdale (2/2)	Report	Try: J. Ford; E. Ford; Con: Lawton (1/2)

Murrayfield, Edinburgh
Attendance: 50,000
Referee: W.J. Llewellyn (Wales)

Team details

Scotland: Dan Drysdale, Edward Taylor, Robert Kelly, James Dykes, Bill Simmers, Harry Greenlees, Peter Douty, William Ferguson, William Roughead, James Scott, John Bannerman, David MacMyn, James Graham, Willie Welsh, John Patterson
New South Wales: Alex Ross, Eric Ford, Syd King, Billy Sheehan, Johnnie Wallace, Tom Lawton, Syd Malcolm, Harry Woods, Jock Blackwood, Bruce Judd, Geoff Storey, Huck Finlay, Arnold Tancred, Jack Ford, Wylie Breckenridge

Notes:

- "The playing area at Murrayfield had been covered throughout the week with straw as a protection against the inclemency of the weather and this covering was removed only just prior to the commencement of the match. The day was bitterly cold but notwithstanding this a crowd of 55,000 was present to witness the finest exhibition of the 15-a-side code that has been given for a number of years.
- The tactical keynote both in attack and defence of each of those evenly matched sides was speed. With 20 minutes left to play, both sides had scored two tries each, but the local side had converted twice, while the Waratahs had only been successful in this respect once. The spectators were mad with excitement during the last 10 minutes, as a NSW forward crossed the line twice but was recalled for infringements while the Waratah captain, after having beaten the opposition lost his footing on the partly frozen surface. A draw would have been a better ending to the game instead of the 10–8 victory for Scotland, as it did not seem fitting that such an even and thrilling contest should be decided by a kick. It will suffice to say that the match will live long in the memory of those who witnessed as well as participated in it". (Towers)
- The match would ultimately be recognised as the first ever Test between Scotland and an Australian side.

=== England ===
7 January 1928

England	18–11	New South Wales
Try: Taylor; Laird; Tucker; Periton; Con: Richardson (3/4)	Report	Try: E. Ford (2); Towers; Con: Lawton (1/2)

Twickenham Stadium, London
Attendance: 62,000
Referee: T.H. Vile (Wales)

Team details

England	New South Wales

Monkey Sellar	FB	Alex Ross
William Kirwan-Taylor	W	Eric Ford
Carl Aarvold	C	Cyril Towers
James Richardson	C	Syd King
Thomas Devitt	W	Johnnie Wallace (c)
Colin Laird	FH	Tom Lawton
Arthur Young	SH	Syd Malcolm
Kendrick Stark	P	Bruce Judd
Sam Tucker	H	Jock Blackwood
Ron Cove-Smith (c)	P	Harry Woods
David Turquand-Young	L	Geoff Storey
Edward Stanbury	L	Huck Finlay
Thomas Lawson	F	Ted Greatorex
Joe Periton	F	Wylie Breckenridge
Thomas Coulson	N8	Jack Ford

Notes:

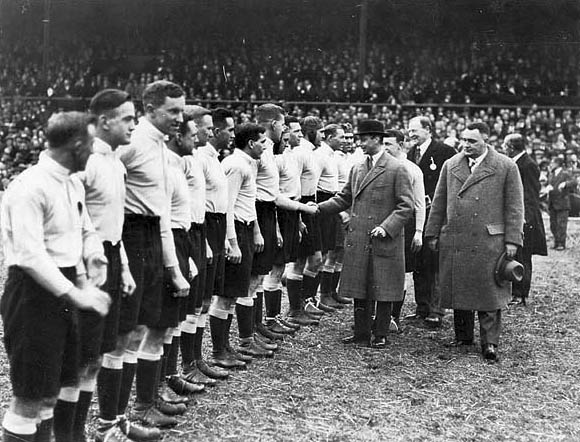
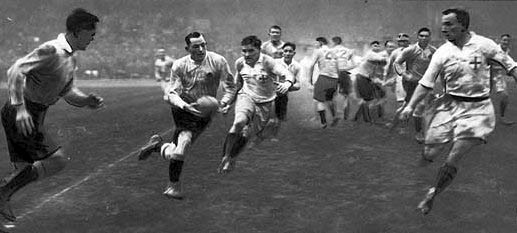
Left: The Duke of York meets the Waratahs before playing England at Twickenham, 7 Jan 1928; right: Tom Lawton, Snr in action during that match
- England played with the wind at their backs in the first half and made all the running. A dash down the wing, a centring kick and the flanker J.S Tucker was over for a try which was converted 5–0 to England. Wallace made several breaks in the centre and then told Cyril Towers to loop outside him when he broke again. The move was executed brilliantly and with the conversion the scored were tied 5–5.(Zavos)
- "Up till half-time, the game had been fast and brilliant, with the Englishmen having a commanding lead of 10 points (15–5) at the interval. Soon after the change over, the locals increased their lead with another try and it was from then that the game reached such a height as a spectacle that it caused the press to place it in number-one position as the greatest game ever seen in England. Even champions of the past, great supporters of bygone games, conceded that the efforts of the Waratahs to make up a deficit of 13 points during the concluding 20 minutes was productive of the finest football imaginable".(Towers)
- The Waratahs showed their great fighting spirit by going into an extra-Waratah mode, attacking from everywhere, with John Ford, the massive number 8, taking the ball up time after time. Towers scored 18–8. Then the winger Eric Ford raced through the England defence 18–11. The Waratahs were still attacking the England line desperate to snatch the victory, when the full-time whistle blew. The crowd roared its appreciation of a great game of rugby, with the applause continuing long after the players had retired to the changing rooms and the hot tubs. (Zavos)

=== France ===
22 January 1928

France	8–11	New South Wales
Try: Bonamy; Camel; Con: Béhotéguy (1/2)	Report	Try: Wallace; E. Ford; Towers; Con: Lawton (1/3)

Stade Colombes, Paris
Attendance: 40,000
Referee: T.J. Bradburn (England)

Team details

France	New South Wales

Louis Pellissier	FB	Alex Ross
Adolphe Jaureguy (c)	W	Johnnie Wallace (c)
Andre Behoteguy	C	Cyril Towers
Henri Behoteguy	C	Syd King
Edmond Vellat	W	Eric Ford
Charles Lacazedieu	FH	Tom Lawton
Clement Dupont	SH	Syd Malcolm
Andre Loury	P	Malcolm Blair
Georges Vaills	H	Jock Blackwood
Jean Morere	P	Jim Tancred
Andre Camel	L	Geoff Storey
Jean Galia	L	Charlie Fox
Raoul Bonamy	F	Ted Greatorex
Eugene Ribere	F	Wylie Breckenridge
Albert Cazenave	N8	Arthur Finlay

- "The game resulted in a Waratah victory and the standard of play was high, but the antics of the locals rather distracted us. The mere fact of having to conclude the match that day did not prevent some of the players from lying down for a spell when they were tired, or holding up the game to debate a point with the referee (who did not speak French) while a weep following on a hard tackle seemed to be part of their tactics".(Towers)
- The match would ultimately be recognised as the first ever Test between France and an Australian side.
