= List of Old Sydneians =

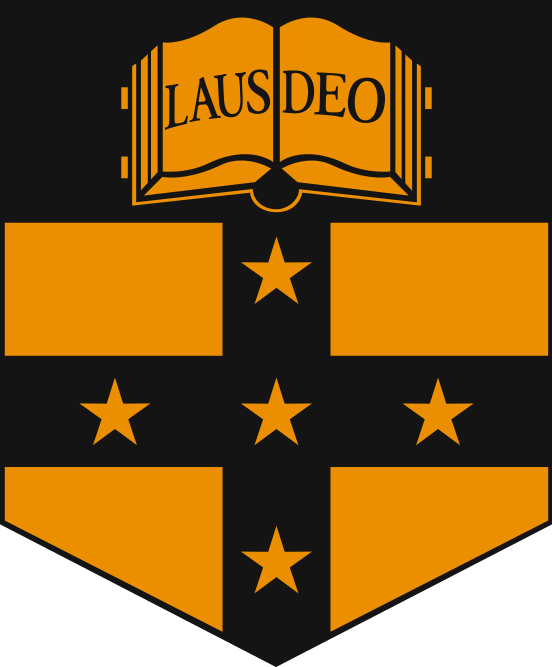

Old Sydneians' Union Logo

The following is a list of notable past pupils of Sydney Grammar School (SGS), an independent, non-denominational day school for boys, located in Sydney, Australia.

Former pupils of the school are known as Old Sydneians.

== Politics, public service and the law ==
=== Lawyers ===
==== High Court of Australia ====
- Sir Edmund Barton (1859–1864), former Justice of the High Court of Australia and the first Prime Minister of Australia
- William Gummow, former Justice of the High Court of Australia
- Sir Anthony Mason, former Chief Justice of the High Court of Australia and chancellor of the University of New South Wales
- Sir Richard O'Connor (1867), former Justice of the High Court of Australia and politician
- Albert Piddington, former Justice of the High Court of Australia
- Sir George Rich, former Justice of the High Court of Australia
- Sir Victor Windeyer, former Justice of the High Court of Australia

Federal Court of Australia

- James Allsop AO, current Chief Justice of the Federal Court of Australia
- John Lehane, former Justice of the Federal Court of Australia

==== Supreme Court of New South Wales ====
- Andrew Bell, current Chief Justice of New South Wales and Lieutenant-Governor of New South Wales
- Sir Leslie Herron, former Chief Justice of the Supreme Court of New South Wales
- Kim Santow, former Justice of the Supreme Court of New South Wales Court of Appeal, and a former chancellor of the University of Sydney
- Sir Kenneth Street, former Chief Justice of the Supreme Court of New South Wales
- Sir Philip Street, former Chief Justice of the Supreme Court of New South Wales

==== Other notable lawyers ====
- Alan Blow AO, current Chief Justice of Tasmania and Lieutenant-Governor of Tasmania
- Sir Norman Cowper, former lawyer. businessman, and administrator

=== Politicians ===
==== Australian parliament ====
- Sir Edmund Barton (1859–1864), the first Prime Minister of Australia; Justice of the High Court of Australia
- Peter Baume, former Senator for New South Wales; physician; chancellor of the Australian National University
- Max Falstein, Member for Watson (1940–1949) in the Australian House of Representatives
- Paul Fletcher, Member for Bradfield in the Australian House of Representatives
- Sir William McMahon (in office 10 March 1971 – 5 December 1972), 20th Prime Minister of Australia
- Harold Thorby, former member for Calare in the Australian House of Representatives and NSW government minister
- Malcolm Turnbull, 29th Prime Minister of Australia
- Warwick Stacey, One Nation Senator

==== New South Wales parliament ====
- Sir George Fuller, former Premier of New South Wales
- Alex Greenwich, current Member for Sydney
- Sir Norman Kater, politician, medical practitioner and grazier
- James Macarthur-Onslow, member of both the Legislative Assembly and the Legislative Council; Australian Army Major General; later a businessman
- John Maddison, former Attorney General of New South Wales
- Harold Thorby, former NSW government minister and Member for Calare in the Australian House of Representatives
- Andrew Tink, former politician, historian and author

==== Other state parliaments ====
- Alan Cobcroft, former member of the Legislative Council of Samoa
- John Fletcher, former Member of the Queensland Legislative Assembly and cricketer
- Charles Mein (1857–1859), justice of the Supreme Court of Queensland, Member of the Queensland Legislative Council
- Sir Boyd Dunlop Morehead, former Premier of Queensland

==== Local government and community activism ====
- George Newhouse, former mayor of Waverley Municipal Council
- Brett Solomon, co-founder of accessnow.org

=== Public servants ===
- Vivian Brain, former electrical engineer and first deputy-chairman of the Electricity Commission of New South Wales
- Nicholas Cowdery, former Director of Public Prosecutions in New South Wales
- James Fraser, former civil engineer and Chief Commissioner of New South Wales Government Railways from 1917 to 1929
- Sir Robert Garran, former lawyer and first Solicitor-General of Australia
- Sir Hubert Murray, former Lieutenant-Governor of the Territory of Papua and boxer

==== Military service ====
- General John Antill, Australian Army Major General during World War I
- Clive Caldwell, Royal Australian Air Force World War II ace fighter pilot
- General Sir Harry Chauvel, Australian Army Chief of Staff
- General John Grey, Australian Army Chief and chancellor of James Cook University
- James Gordon Legge, Australian Army Lieutenant General during World War I
- James Macarthur-Onslow, Australian Army Major General during the Second Boer War and World War I, and later politician and businessman
- Henry Normand MacLaurin, Australian Army Brigadier General during World War I

== Humanities ==
=== Academia ===
- Henry Kingsley Archdall, academic and clergyman
- Sir Christopher Clark, academic and Regius Professor of History at the University of Cambridge
- Alec Hill, historian
- Dr Stephen Spurr, headmaster at the Westminster School
- E. G. Waterhouse, linguist, professor of German at the University of Sydney, plant breeder

=== Social sciences ===
- Hugh Mackay, social commentator and former chairman of trustees of Sydney Grammar School
- Malcolm Mackerras, psephologist

=== Media and journalism ===
- George Blaikie, author and journalist
- Richard Carleton, reporter with the Australian edition of 60 Minutes
- Charles Firth, member of The Chaser comedy team
- Bruce Gyngell, first man to appear on Australian television
- Paul Karp, chief political correspondent at Guardian Australia
- Dominic Knight, member of The Chaser comedy team
- Chas Licciardello, member of The Chaser comedy team
- Tim Palmer, journalist with the Australian Broadcasting Corporation
- Siimon Reynolds, Australian advertising executive who developed the Grim Reaper advertisement for AIDS awareness
- Nicholas Stuart, author and journalist
- Jonathan Swan, journalist with Axios

== Business ==
- Len Ainsworth, founder of Aristocrat Leisure
- Demetrius Comino, engineer, inventor and philanthropist
- James Oswald Fairfax (1863–1928), newspaper proprietor
- James Reading Fairfax (1834–1919), newspaper proprietor
- David Gonski, current chairman of the Future Fund, Coca-Cola Amatil, Australia Council chairman, and chancellor of the University of New South Wales
- Simon Hannes, Macquarie Bank executive who was convicted of insider trading
- Sir Samuel Hordern, a director of Anthony Hordern & Sons
- Steven Lowy, co-chief executive officer of Westfield Corporation

== Sport ==
=== Athletics ===
- Slip Carr, Australian Olympian sprinter (1924)
- Lachlan Renshaw, Australian Olympian middle-distance runner (2008)

=== Boxing ===
- Sir Hubert Murray (1872–1877), English Amateur Heavyweight Boxing Champion; lieutenant-governor of the Territory of Papua

=== Cricket ===
- Eric Barbour, NSW cricketer with 23 first-class matches and 1,577 runs
- Sir Edmund Barton (1859–1864), first-class umpire; first Prime Minister of Australia
- Jim Burke, Australian international with 24 tests and 1,280 runs
- Albert Cotter, Australian international with 21 tests and 89 wickets
- John Fletcher, Queensland cricketer with 3 first-class matches and 97 runs
- Sir Norman Gregg, NSW cricketer with 3 first-class matches and 116 runs
- Hunter Hendry, Australian international with 11 tests and 335 runs
- Sammy Jones, Australian international with 12 tests and 428 runs
- Alan McGilvray, NSW cricketer with 20 first-class matches and 684 runs, most notable for his cricket radio broadcasting
- William Robison, NSW cricketer with 1 first-class match and 15 runs
- Fred Spofforth, Australian international with 18 tests and 94 wickets; first test cricketer to take a hat-trick
- Alan Walker, NSW and Nottingham cricketer with 94 first-class matches and 221 wickets; also played for Australia in rugby union
- Sammy Woods, Australian and England international with 6 tests and 10 wickets; also played for England in rugby union

=== Rowing ===
- Mervyn Finlay, Australian Olympian (1952; 1 bronze medal)
- Joe Gould, Australian Olympian (1936)
- Frederick Septimus Kelly, British Olympian (1908; 1 gold medal)
- Vic Middleton, Australian Olympian (1952)
- Hugh Ward, Australasian Olympian (1912); soldier who was awarded the Military Cross and two Bars
- Stuart Welch, Australian dual Olympian (2000 and 2004; 1 silver medal, 1 bronze medal)

=== Rugby league ===
- Dallas Hodgins, North Sydney Bears player
- Nick Pappas (1969–1978), chairman of South Sydney Rabbitohs

=== Rugby union ===
- Malcolm Blair, Australian international with 3 caps and 0 points
- Ernie Carr, Australian international with 6 caps and 3 points; brother of Slip Carr
- Slip Carr, Australian international with 4 caps and 9 points; Australian Olympic athlete; brother of Ernie Carr
- Tim Clark, Australian sevens international
- Cam Crawford, NSW Waratahs and ACT Brumbies player with 13 Super Rugby caps and 40 points
- Emile de Lissa, President, Barbarian F.C.
- David Emanuel, Australian international with 9 caps and 0 points
- Arthur Finlay, Australian international with 12 caps and 0 points
- Charlie Fox, Australian international with 17 caps and 6 points; also the Australian captain
- Charles Hammand, Australian international with 2 caps and 0 points
- Bill Hemingway, Australian international with 5 caps and 9 points
- Julian Huxley, Australian international with 9 caps and 22 points
- Wal Ives, Australian international with 5 caps and 0 points
- Doug Keller, Australian and Scotland international with 13 caps and 0 points; also Scottish captain
- Bob Loudon, Australian international with 13 caps and 12 points; Australian captain; brother of Darby Loudon
- Darby Loudon, Australian international with 4 caps and 5 points; Australian captain; brother of Bob Loudon
- Jack Maddocks, current player for the Melbourne Rebels, played for Australian Under-20s
- Hyam Marks (1886–1892), Australian international with 2 caps and 0 points; played in first ever test
- Andrew Mower, Scotland international with 13 caps and 0 points
- Walter Phipps, Australian international with 1 cap and 0 points
- Roland Raymond, Australian international with 13 caps and 30 points
- Alex Ross, Australian international with 20 caps and 43 points; also the Australian captain
- Geoff Storey, Australian international with 8 caps and 0 points
- Alan Walker, Australian international with 5 caps and 3 points; also a first-class cricketer
- Alfred Walker, Australian international with 16 caps and 9 points; also the Australian captain
- Johnnie Wallace, Australia and Scotland international with 17 caps and 48 points; also the Australian captain
- Clarrie Wallach, Australian international with 5 caps and 0 points
- Colin Windon, Australian international with 20 caps and 33 points; also the Australian captain
- Sammy Woods, England international with 13 caps and 6 points; also an international for Australia and England in cricket

=== Swimming ===
- Boy Charlton, Australian Olympian (1924, 1928 and 1932; 1 gold medal, 3 silver medals, 1 bronze medal)
- Frederick Lane, Australian Olympian (1900; 2 gold medals); Australia's first Olympic swimmer

=== Tennis ===
- John Newcombe, seven-time Grand Slam winner

=== Other sports ===
- Andrew Lock, Australian mountaineer
- Rohan Chapman-Davies, Australian Olympic mogul skier
- Jim Ferrier, golfer
- Dr. Thomas A. Middlemost, Roller Derby Australian Men's Team World Roller Games Barcelona Spain 2019

== Arts ==
=== Performing arts ===
==== Film, television, and theatre ====
- Dr Richard James Allen, writer, director and choreographer (Thursday's Fictions 2006 and numerous short films)
- Stephan Elliott, writer and director (The Adventures of Priscilla, Queen of the Desert 1994)
- Richard Francis-Bruce, Academy Award–nominated film editor (The Shawshank Redemption 1994, Seven 1995, Air Force One 1997)
- Andrew Lesnie, Academy Award–winning cameraman (The Lord of the Rings: The Fellowship of the Ring 2002)
- John Meillon, film, television and voice actor (Crocodile Dundee, Crocodile Dundee II)
- Gregan McMahon, actor and theatrical producer
- Julian McMahon (1973–1986), actor; son of Prime Minister McMahon
- Charles 'Bud' Tingwell, film and theatre actor

==== Music ====
- Alexander Briger, conductor
- Nigel Butterley, composer
- Tim Derricourt, songwriter for indie rock group Dappled Cities and current English master at Sydney Grammar School
- Ross Edwards, composer
- Sam Fischer, singer-songwriter
- Rob Hirst, drummer for Midnight Oil
- Sir Charles Mackerras, conductor
- Antony Walker (1980–1985), conductor

=== Visual arts ===
- Charles Bryant, visual artist
- Max Dupain, photographer
- Donald Friend, visual artist and author

=== Literature ===
- Dr Richard James Allen, poet, dancer, choreographer and director
- John Le Gay Brereton, poet and professor of English
- Michael Dransfield, poet
- Joseph Jacobs, folklorist and literary critic best known for preserving fairy-tales such as Jack and the Beanstalk and The Three Little Pigs
- Dowell Philip O'Reilly, poet and short story writer
- Banjo Paterson, poet and journalist

== Science and medicine ==
- Graeme Segal, mathematician, Chern Medal (2026)
- Dr Bryan Gaensler, Young Australian of the Year, 1999; former assistant professor of astronomy at Harvard University; current professor at the University of Sydney
- Dr Rowan Gillies, former international president of Médecins Sans Frontières
- Sir Norman McAlister Gregg, ophthalmologist who discovered the link between maternal rubella and birth defects
- Edward Rennie, chemist

== See also ==
- List of non-government schools in New South Wales
- Athletic Association of the Great Public Schools of New South Wales
