= Cyril Towers =

Australia international rugby union player (1906-1985)

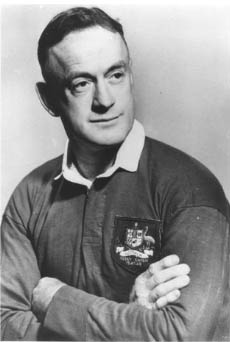
- Towers during his late career with the Wallabies
- Born: Cyril Towers; 30 July 1906 Mansfield, Victoria
- Died: 9 June 1985 (aged 78) Randwick, Sydney
- School: Roma High School; Waverley College; Randwick Boys High

Rugby union career
- Position: Centre
Senior career
Years	Team	Apps	(Points)
1926–1940	Randwick DRUFC	233	
Provincial / State sides
Years	Team	Apps	(Points)
1926–1938	New South Wales	82	
International career
Years	Team	Apps	(Points)
1926–1937	Australia	19	

Cyril Towers (30 July 1906 – 9 June 1985) was an Australian rugby union player, a state and national representative centre who made 57 appearances for the Wallabies, played in 19 Test matches and captained the national team on three occasions in 1937.

== Club career ==
Cyril Towers was born in Mansfield, Victoria. His father was killed at Gallipoli when he was nine-years-old. After his mother remarried, his family moved first to Melbourne, then to Roma, Queensland, before they settled in Sydney. Towers attended Randwick Boys High School where he was taught rugby by Oates Taylor, described by former Australian rugby coach Bob Dwyer as a "forward-thinking coach." Towers was later transferred to Waverley College where he came under the influence of coach Arthur Hennessey and future Wallabies player Wally Meagher, whom he would play with on the 1927–28 New South Wales rugby union tour of the British Isles, France and Canada.

Towers' club career was with Randwick DRUFC in Sydney for whom he made 233 first grade appearances. Along with Wally Meagher his senior at Randwick, Towers pioneered the application of running rugby tactics at the club. "Attack" was the main credo, setting up the wings the main goal and kicking for touch was frowned upon.

== Representative career ==
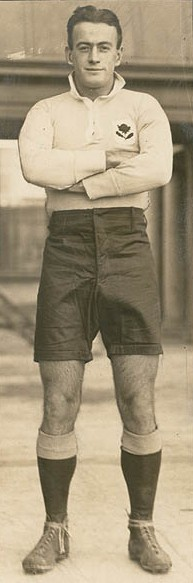
Cyril Towers with the New South Wales Waratahs

His representative debut was as a 19-year-old in 1926 when selected for the New South Wales Waratahs to appear against a touring All Blacks outfit. New South Wales won the match 26–20 and Towers was recalled for the fourth encounter which the hosts lost 21–28. With no Queensland Rugby Union administration or competition in place from 1919 to 1929, the New South Wales Waratahs were the top Australian representative rugby union team of the period and these debut matches were in 1986 decreed by the Australian Rugby Union as official Test matches.

Towers was selected for the 1927–28 New South Wales rugby union tour of the British Isles, France and Canada, turning 21 on the ship going over. He played in 25 matches of the tour exceeded only by Wylie Breckenbridge (29), Tom Lawton (27) and Alex Ross (29). With Jack Ford he was the equal top try scorer and the equal second highest point scorer behind Lawton. He played in three Test matches of the tour.

He wrote a travel diary of the 1927–28 tour which was serialised between June and December 1928 for the magazine Australian Banker. (Towers worked in banking). His Test match reports are quoted extensively in the tour article.

Towers toured New Zealand in 1928 with the Waratahs under Syd Malcolm as captain. Geoff Bland was the only other veteran from the 1927 World Tour squad and five matches in total were won and five lost. Towers played in all matches, including three Tests and was top scorer with 29 points. Howell quotes Chester and McMillan from The Visitors: "Towers was hailed by many critics as the best centre in the world rugby and was certainly one of the great Australian players of all time".

In 1929 the All Blacks toured Australia, Towers was in two of the three Test team captained by Tom Lawton which for the first time in history beat the All Blacks 3–0 in a series whitewash. With the Queensland Rugby Union now back in existence for the first time since 1919 this was the first truly national Wallabies team fielded since 1914.

== National captain ==
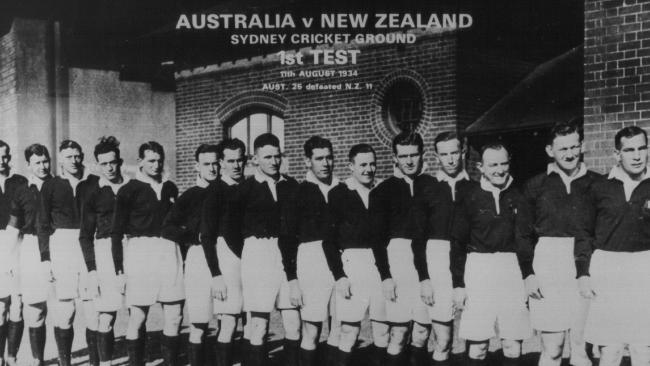
Towers (6th from left) with the victorious Bledisloe Wallabies, 1st Test v NZ 11Aug1934

Great Britain toured Australia in 1930 and Towers played against them in four matches for state and country. Then in 1931 he was a senior in the full Australian team sent to New Zealand with Syd Malcolm as captain. They won three, drew one and lost six matches including the single Test but Towers played in nine matches, was the tour's top try-scorer and was honoured for the first time with the national captaincy in a minor match against Seddon Shield Districts.

In 1933, Towers was left out of the squad that made Australia's first ever rugby tour of South Africa. It was a controversial omission made by team manager Dr Wally Mathews because of Towers' forthrightness and perceived disruptiveness. Still he had further representative appearances ahead of him. In 1934 he played in the two match series against the All Blacks in which the Wallabies wrestled away the Bledisloe Cup for the first time. Then in 1937 perhaps his finest hour, as Australia's Test captain in the 9–5 defeat against the touring Springboks then hailed as the finest team in the world, in which game Towers scored all of Australia's points and inspired the defence to hold out the Boks onslaught.

He retired in 1940 after having again been left out of the 1939 Wallaby team – a blessing since the team travelled to the other side of the world but did not play a match due to the outbreak of World War II. He had played 57 matches for Australia, 19 of them Tests, 2 of those as captain.

== Post-playing and family ==
In retirement he was one of the first rugby commentators, becoming known as the "voice of rugby" from his broadcasts for the Australian Broadcasting Commission.

His son-in-law Jake Howard played in the front-row for the Wallabies in the 1970s. Jake's son, Cyril's grandson Pat Howard, also played centre for Australia in the 1990s. A plaque in the Sydney Cricket Ground's Walk of Honour commemorates Towers' career. In 2006 he was honoured in the second set of inductees into the Australian Rugby Union Hall of Fame

Preceded by Ron Walden	Australian national rugby union captain 1937	Succeeded by Vay Wilson
