= Keith Storey =

Keith Storey may refer to:

- Keith Storey (rugby union) (1912–1998), Australian rugby union player
- Keith Storey (footballer) (1905–1979), Australian rules footballer
