= Brian Ford (rugby union, born 1939) =

- Full name: Brian William Ford
- Born: 8 November 1939 Sydney, Australia
- Died: 8 November 2011 (aged 72)
- School: St Columban's College
- Notable relative(s): Eric Ford (uncle); Jack Ford (uncle)

Rugby union career
- Position: Wing
International career
| Years | Team | Apps | (Points) |
| 1957 | Australia | 1 | (0) |

Brian William Ford (3 March 1939 – 8 November 2011) was an Australian rugby union international.

Born in Sydney, Ford was a nephew of rugby internationals Eric and Jack Ford, who were brothers of his father Monty. He was educated in Queensland at St Columban's College and competed in The Associated Schools athletics championships as a sprinter. Playing his rugby as a three-quarter, Ford made his first-grade debut for Souths aged 17.

Ford gained a Wallabies cap in 1957 as a left winger against the All Blacks at the Brisbane Exhibition Ground. Still only 18, he is the youngest known debutant for the Wallabies, as well as the only Queensland representative in the XV. A back injury sustained playing for Queensland against the touring British Lions in 1960 made him to give the game away.

== See also ==
- List of Australia national rugby union players
