= West Harbour RFC =

Australian rugby union club, based in Concord, NSW

West Harbour
- Full name: West Harbour Rugby Football Club (1995–)
- Nickname: Pirates
- Founded: 1900; 126 years ago as "Western Suburbs RFC"
- Location: Concord, Sydney
- Ground: Concord Oval (Capacity: 5,000)
- President: Lloyd Mills
- Coach: Ben Rutherford
- League: Shute Shield
Team kit

Official website
- westharbourrugby.com.au

The West Harbour Rugby Football Club is a professional Australian rugby union club based in Concord, New South Wales. Founded in 1900 as the Western Suburbs District R.U.F.C., the club is one of the oldest in Australia and competes in the Shute Shield, the premier New South Wales club competition.

The club's home ground is Concord Oval, which holds a significant place in Australian rugby history as a key venue for the inaugural Rugby World Cup in 1987.

== Club information ==
Uniform colours: Black, White and Red
Premiership Titles: 2 titles: 1902, 1929

In 1900 the Western Suburbs club's first adopted colours were maroon and white, then blue and white 1901-08, bottle green 1909-14 and black and white from 1920. In conjunction with the 1995 name change to West Harbour and Pirates moniker, red was added to the traditional black and white.

== Club history ==
Beginnings

West Harbour R.F.C. was founded in 1900 as Western Suburbs D.R.U.F.C under the newly introduced districts club scheme, where players qualified on a residency basis. The club in 1900 had a very large area encompassing Ashfield, Burwood, Concord and Parramatta. As early as 1896 the advocates for the scheme had foreshadowed the inclusion of a "Western Suburbs" named district club.

The club originally fielded only two grade teams but still won the Sydney Premiership at its third attempt in 1902. Since then the club has won one other championship in 1929.

Western Suburbs’ boundaries were far-reaching in its early days because the club could draw on players from Concord to the harbour, south to Port Hacking, north to the Parramatta River, and west to the Blue Mountains. When Parramatta, St George, Drummoyne, Gordon and Eastwood joined the competition, these boundaries were reduced.

Between the wars

Western Suburbs enjoyed a golden era after the war when Secretary Francis Joseph Herlihy co-opted Tom.S.R (Iron Guts) Davis, Larry Wogan, and Charlie Rea to help lift the club’s fortunes. They built a playing strength that enabled Western Suburbs to figure prominently in the competition for years and to win the competition in 1929

The brothers Geoff (1929) and Keith Storey (1936) entered international football from Western Suburbs followed by Sid King (1929), M.R.Blair (1931), T.S.Lawton (1929), A.Thorpe (1929), P.K.Collins (1937), R.L.F.Kelly (1936), R.E.M.McLaughlin (1936), T.P.Pauling (1936), and Cecil Ramalli (1938). Phil Hardcastle was an established Test player when he joined the club from Easts in 1948.

Relegation and promotion

Western Suburbs were excluded from the competition after the 1951 season and its area was divided up and redistributed to neighbouring clubs.. When a new Second Division was established in 1962, Wests were admitted as one of the founding clubs. In 1966 Wests were promoted back into 1st Division with a further redistribution of club boundaries made to restore its area.

It was at this point that the club’s fortunes changed when Rufus Miahere joined as 1st Grade coach in 1970. Miahere began with seven wins in 1971 and eight wins in 1972. In 1973 he lifted the Club back to the glory it had enjoyed in the 1930s by winning 17 matches in a row. Western Suburbs won the Club Championships that year and the season was flawed only by a loss to Randwick in the Grand Final. That year Laurie Monaghan became the Club’s first test player since World War II, followed shortly after by one of Sydney’s true Rugby characters, Mick Ellem.

The Club was once again relegated to 2nd Division in 1980 and then promoted back to 1st Division in 1981. In 1982, the Club had discussions with the Sydney Rugby Union regarding the upgrade of Concord Oval. The Club made a donation of $250,000 to the NSWRU, which allowed the State Government to provide a further $1 million and saw Concord Oval transformed into a world class rugby venue, which in 1987 saw more than 25,000 people attend the World Cup semi-final match between Australia and France.

Resurgence and Professionalism

The 1980s and '90s saw a resurgence in the Club’s strength. Stephen James represented Australia in a number of Test series from 1986 and Fili Finau wore the green and gold on a French Tour in 1993.

In 1995, the Club changed its name to the West Harbour Rugby Football Club to more truly reflect the Club’s location in the inner west of the harbour city. In 1997, Fili Finau once again represented Australia, this time against New Zealand in the Bledisloe Cup. Jason Madz and Fili Finau also featured prominently for the NSW Super 12 side during this period.

Steve Devine represented NSW and Australia U/21s and played with the Waratahs before signing a Super 12 contract with the Auckland Blues. Steve was then selected as a member of the All Blacks eventually playing 13 tests for New Zealand. Pierre Hola capped off a fine 2001 season by being selected in the Tongan national team and was a member of the Tongan 2003 World Cup Squad.

In 2000/01 Des Tuiavii played for the ACT Brumbies before taking up a NSW Waratahs contract for the 2002/03 seasons. Des won both the Sydney Morning Herald’s Player of the Year and the NSWRU Ken Catchpole Medal in 2001 and played his 100th 1st Grade game for West Harbour in 2003. Des finished a remarkable 2003 season by playing for the Samoan side in the 2003 World Cup.

In the early to mid 2000s, West Harbour had a number of players in the NSW Waratah and Junior Waratah squads including Lote Tuqiri, Timana Tahu, Chris O’Young and Elia Tiqiri all represented the Waratahs in 2004. Chris Siale and Rodney Blake represented the Australia U/21 side in the IRB Championships in Scotland. Both subsequently signed Super 12 contracts.

Seven West Harbour players Penny Anderson, Louise Ferris, Charmain Smith, Debby Hodgkinson, Tui Ormsby, Nyree Osieck, Pearl Palaialii represented the Australian Wallaroos at the Women’s Rugby World Cup in Spain in 2002. Debby Hodgkinson was named the SMH “Player of the Year” for the 2004 season.

A Golden Era

The period between 2000-2010 saw West Harbour show its place as one of Sydney’s most successful clubs. Multiple lower grade premierships and a club championship saw the club continuing the great traditional of developing local talent across colts and grade. Local juniors Rodney Blake, Salesi Maafu and Scott Sio all donned Wallaby gold and Rugby League converts Lote Tuqiri and Timana Tahu used West Harbour to hone their rugby union craft and create their opportunities into wallaby jerseys. Numerous players were capped by super rugby franchises and many would go on to make their professional rugby debuts both in Australia and abroad. Wallaby James O’Conner and All Black Zac Guilford made West Harbour Rugby their Sydney homes while More recently former Wallaby Taqele Naiyaravoro and New Wallaby Carlo Tizzano played for West Harbour during their time at the Waratahs. 2017 saw Taylor Adam’s win the prestigious Ken Catchpole Medal as the Shute Shields best player after a dominant performance over the season.

The club also saw many 1st Grade coaches from within the ranks go on to coach in professional environments worldwide.

The Current Era

West Harbour continue to compete in Sydney’s Premier Rugby Competition. Currently the club hosts 4 Grade teams and 3 Colts teams. The redevelopment of Concord Oval has allowed the club to further progress their High Performance plan with a state of the art gym and world class game day facilities.

The club has Steve Shapland working full time in the Colts and Pathways Programs continuing to attract and develop young local rugby talent. The club recently appointed Ben Rutherford as Head Coach to the current playing group for the back end of 2025 and into the 2026 season.

2025 also sees the club bringing former player and first grade coach Mark Gudmunson back into the Clubs coaching structure to better build connection through the clubs coaching philosophy.

The club also further enhanced the coaching team by bringing in former club captain and previous Strength and Conditioning Coach Shane McLeod to support the clubs High Performance strategy.

The club has a history of multiculturalism and connection to the local community.

Representatives

Overall 48 players who have played for the Club have gone on to represent the Wallabies, along with the large number of Wallabies and Wallaroos representative players. Due to the diverse nature of West Harbour Rugby Club, 36 players have gone on to represent other nations in international rugby including Samoa, Tonga, Fiji, Wales, Ireland, Scotland, New Zealand, the Philippines, Malta, Croatia and Lebanon.

89 players have been selected for representative honours with the New South Wales Waratahs and many others have played with other Super Rugby franchises.

== Australian Wallaby Representatives ==
- (Australia) Stanley Wickham
- (Australia) Ward Prentice
- (Australia) Larry Wogan
- (Australia) Clarrie Prentice
- (Australia) Tom Davis
- (Australia) Roger Barton
- (Australia) Tom Lawton
- (Australia) George McKay
- (Australia) John W. Shute
- (Australia) Reg Lane
- (Australia) Alexander Armstrong
- (Australia) Hugh Buntine
- (Australia) Harry Bryant
- (Australia) Bruce Judd
- (Australia) Syd King
- (Australia) Geoff Storey
- (Australia) Malcolm Blair
- (Australia) Harold Bartley
- (Australia) Eric Bardsley
- (Australia) John O'Donnell
- (Australia) Cam Gordon
- (Australia) Alan Thorpe
- (Australia) Paul Collins
- (Australia) Russell Kelly
- (Australia) Bill McLaughlin
- (Australia) Tom Pauling
- (Australia) Keith Storey
- (Australia) Cecil Ramalli
- (Australia) Phil Hardcastle
- (Australia) Jim Walsh
- (Australia) Geoffrey Vaughan
- (Australia) Barry Stumbles
- (Australia) Laurence Monaghan
- (Australia) Mick Ellem
- (Australia) Steve James
- (Australia) Anthony Daly
- (Australia) Michael Foley
- (Australia) Fili Finau
- (Australia) Bill Young
- (Australia) Lote Tuqiri
- (Australia) Matt Dunning
- (Australia) Rodney Blake
- (Australia) Timana Tahu
- (Australia) James O'Connor
- (Australia) Salesi Ma'afu
- (Australia) Scott Sio
- (Australia) Taqele Naiyaravoro
- (Australia) Allan Alaalatoa

== Former players who have represented other nations ==
- Fergus Keogh, (Ireland)
- Tali Kavapalu, (Tonga)
- Watisoni Nasalo, (Fiji)
- (Socialist Federal Republic of Yugoslavia) Zoran Prijic, (Yugoslavia)
- Richard Moriarty, (Wales)
- Paul Moriarty, (Wales)
- Vili Alaalatoa, (Samoa)
- Fetaiaki Langi, (Tonga)
- Fua Veiru, (Samoa)
- Dan Parks, (Scotland)
- Steve Devine, (New Zealand)
- Pierre Hola, (Tonga)
- Des Tuiavi'i, (Samoa)
- Campese Ma'afu, (Fiji)
- Sitiveni Mafi, (Tonga)
- Matthew Jarrett, (Malta)
- Ben Abood, (Lebanon)
- Elias Sarkis, (Lebanon)
- Jason Khoury, (Lebanon)
- Anthony Manassa, (Lebanon)
- Ben Volavola, (Fiji)
- Zac Guildford, (New Zealand)
- Wayne Ngaluafe, (Tonga)
- Sione Tau, (Tonga)
- Daniel Ricky Kucia, (Philippines)
- David Lolohea, (Tonga)
- Albert Tuisue, (Fiji)
- Ned Rush Stephenson, (Philippines)
- Michael Alaalatoa, (Samoa)

== Current Super Rugby players ==
- Cameron Orr, (Brumbies)
- Jack Debreczeni, (Brumbies)
- Allan Alaalatoa (Brumbies)
- Albert Alcock (Western Force)
- Carlo Tizzano (Western Force)
- James O'Connor (Crusaders)
- Josh Thompson (Western Force)
- Vuate Karawalevu (Fijian Drua)

== Former Super Rugby players ==
- Salesi Ma'afu (Brumbies)
- Sam Wykes (Western Force)
- Rory Sidey, (Waratahs)
- Alofa Alofa, (Waratahs)
- Michael Alaalatoa, (Crusaders)
- Tiaan Swanepoel, (Lions)
