= Billy Sheehan (rugby union) =

Australian rugby union player

- Born: William Beverley James Sheehan c. 1903 Sydney
- Died: c. 1957
- School: The King's School
- University: Sydney University
- Occupation: Medical practitioner

Rugby union career
- Position: fly-half
International career
Years	Team	Apps	(Points)
1921–27	Waratahs	18	(18)

William Beverley James Sheehan (c. 1903 – c. 1957) was an Australian rugby union player, a state and national representative fly-half in the 1920s. Eighteen of his New South Wales state appearances have since been decreed as Test matches by the Australian Rugby Union and Sheehan, who led the side in three such matches in 1923, was therefore a captain of the Australian national team.

== Rugby career ==
Following his time at The King's School in Sydney, Sheehan was accepted to study medicine at Sydney University and stated his club rugby at the Sydney University Football Club. He won university blues in 1921, 1923, 1924, 1926 and 1927 and captained the club to premiership victory in the Shute Shield in 1923 and 1924.

His representative debut came in 1921 when the South African national rugby union team made their inaugural tour of Australia and Sheehan was picked at half-back for New South Wales in all three matches against them. With no Queensland Rugby Union administration or competition in place from 1919 to 1929, the New South Wales Waratahs were the top Australian representative rugby union side of the period and a number of their 1920s fixtures played against full international opposition were decreed in 1986 as official Test matches, including the three of Sheehan's 1921 debut and fifteen other appearances he would make over the next six years.

In 1922 he appeared in all three Test in Sydney against the visiting All Blacks. In 1923 New Zealand Māori rugby union team visited and Sheehan played all of the three match series in which the Waratahs were undefeated. On the 1923 tour of New Zealand and aged just twenty, Sheehan was honoured with the captaincy of the Waratahs side in all three Tests. He also captained the side in four other tour matches. He then appeared at five-eighth in two Tests at home when the All Blacks toured in 1924. He was focused on his medical studies in 1925 but in 1926 returned to the national side for three Tests in 1926.

He was selected for the 1927–28 Waratahs tour of the British Isles, France and Canada though he traveled separately to the team as he was completing his medical exams. He played in the Tests against Wales and Scotland in the centres and playing in ten other tour matches in which on a number of occasions he took over as five-eighth from Tom Lawton.

Following the tour the stayed in England for a period to further his medical studies before returning to Australia.

Preceded by Watty Friend	Australian national rugby union captain 1923	Succeeded by Ted Thorn

=== Bibliography ===
- Howell, Max (2005) Born to Lead – Wallaby Test Captains, Celebrity Books, Auckland NZ
