= Pat Davies (rugby union) =

England international rugby union player

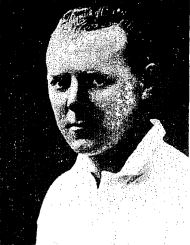
- Born: Harry Patrick Davies; March 17, 1903 Stockport, Cheshire
- Died: 21 February 1979 (aged 75) Ware, Hertfordshire
- Occupation: Mantle manufacturer

Rugby union career
- Position: Flanker
Senior career
Years	Team	Apps	(Points)
- Sale Sharks
Provincial / State sides
Years	Team	Apps	(Points)
	Cheshire	48	
International career
Years	Team	Apps	(Points)
1927	England	1	(0)
- Correct as of 29 August 2022

Harry Patrick Davies (17 March 1903 – 21 February 1979), or also known as Pat Davies was a rugby union international who represented England in 1927. He played his club rugby for Sale and was the club's first England international. He also represented Cheshire 48 times.

== Early life ==
Davies was born on 17 March 1903 in Stockport. His father was Henry George Davies, a costume manufacturer from London but of Welsh heritage, and his mother was Eleanor Marian Needham, also originally from London. Davies had two older brothers (John Henry and Thomas Esculapias) and a younger sister (Olive Mary). Despite being christened Harry Patrick, his family referred to him and registered him as Patrick Harry Davies in later documents and it was by this name that he married Aline Dorothy St. Clair Collins in 1927 in Birch in Rusholme. During his later rugby playing days he was often referred to as P.H. Davies.

== Rugby football ==
Davies played his club rugby for Sale, now known as Sale Sharks. He selected to play for his county side, Cheshire, on 48 occasions. He went on to become president of Sale in their centenary year of 1961, and prior to that was President of the Cheshire RFU from 1958 to 1960. Davies made his only international appearance on 12 February 1927 at Twickenham in front of 45,000 spectators in the England vs Ireland match. During the match, Ireland initially took the lead with a penalty until Davies pounced on an Irish error to put H C C Laird, the Harlequins stand-off half, over for a try which was then converted by Stanbury. Ireland later regained the lead with a try only for England to wrestle the lead back again, eventually winning 8 points to 6.
