= Jimmy Clark (rugby union) =

Australia international rugby union player (1908–1979)

- Born: James Goode Clark; 24 September 1908 Mount Perry, Queensland
- Died: 11 April 1979 (aged 70)
- School: Gregory Terrace

Rugby union career
Amateur team(s)
Years	Team	Apps	(Points)
- University of Queensland
Provincial / State sides
Years	Team	Apps	(Points)
1930-34	Queensland	25	
International career
Years	Team	Apps	(Points)
1931-33	Wallabies	5	(0)

Jimmy Clark (9 September 1908 – 11 April 1979) was an Australian rugby union player, a flanker who made five representative Test appearances for the Australian national team in the 1930s, captaining in the side in one of these matches. He made 15 appearances for the Queensland state team from 1930 being the period of the revival of the code in Queensland, following its dormancy since World War I.

== Rugby career ==
Clark was born in Mount Perry near Bundaberg, Queensland and attended St Joseph's College, Gregory Terrace.

Jimmy Clark began his rugby career at the state level, making his debut for Queensland against a visiting British side in 1930. The following year, he was selected as vice-captain, under Syd Malcolm, for the Australian national team to tour to New Zealand as vice-captain to Syd Malcolm. He played in seven of the tour's ten matches including two Tests. One of these Tests was against a New Zealand Māori rugby union team and Clark captained the side. It was a mid-week tour match at the time, but was decreed in 1986 as a Test match by the Australian Rugby Union. Accordingly, Clark posthumously earned the honour of being a Wallaby Test captain. His brother Phil Clark was also on that tour.

In 1932 he played in two domestic Test matches when New Zealand toured Australia. The following year he was selected for the first-ever Wallaby tour of South Africa. He played in one Test on tour and in eight other minor matches with injury restricting his game time on the tour.

Preceded by Bob Loudon	Australian national rugby union captain 1931	Succeeded by Dave Cowper
