= List of Australia national rugby union team captains =

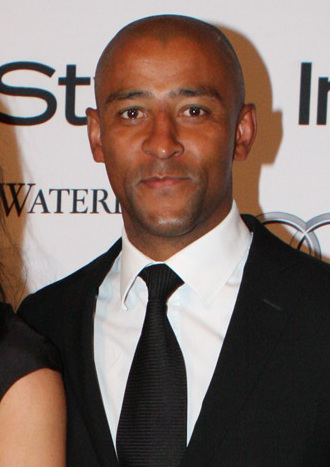
George Gregan, who played for his country between 1994 and 2007, captained the team in 59 Tests.

Australia has played Test rugby since 1899. Test captains are listed chronologically from the first time they captained Australia in a Test match. Matches are exclusively those that have been granted Test status by the Australian Rugby Union regardless of whether the opposing team's governing body awarded the match Test status or not.

== Captains ==
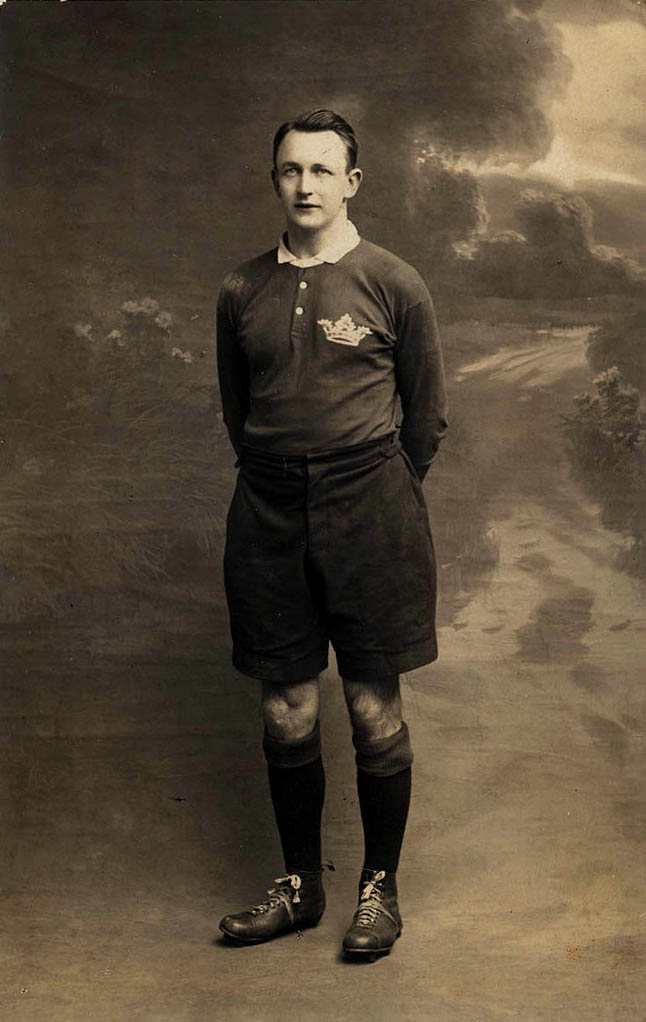
Johnnie Wallace captained the 1927–28 New South Wales Waratahs that toured the Northern Hemisphere. The Australian Rugby Union later recognised the international matches from this tour as Test matches.

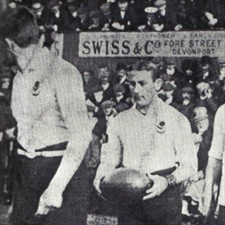
Paddy Moran led the Wallabies on the 1908 Tour.

Players to have captained the Australian rugby union team in a Test match
Number	Name	First Test as captain	Last Test as captain	Total Tests as captain	Total Tests as player	Refs
1	Frank Row	1899	1899	3	3	
2	Bob McCowan	1899	1899	1	3	
3	Stan Wickham	1903	1905	4	5	
4	Frank Nicholson	1904	1904	1	2	
5	Peter Burge	1907	1907	2	3	
6	Allen Oxlade	1907	1907	1	4	
7	Herbert Moran	1908	1908	1	1	
8	Chris McKivat	1909	1909	1	4	
9	Sydney Middleton	1910	1910	3	4	
10	Ward Prentice	1912	1912	1	6	
11	Ted Fahey	1913	1913	2	4	
12	Larry Dwyer	1913	1913	1	8	
13	Fred Wood	1914	1914	2	12	
14	Jimmy Flynn	1914	1914	1	2	
15	William Thornton	1920	1920	3	8	
16	Alfred Walker	1922	1924	11	16	
17	Darby Loudon	1922	1922	1	4	
18	Walter Friend	1923	1923	3	10	
19	Billy Sheehan	1923	1923	3	18	
20	Ted Thorn	1924	1926	6	15	
21	Charlie Fox	1925	1925	1	17	
22	Tom Lawton, Snr	1925	1932	7	14	
23	Johnnie Wallace	1926	1928	6	8	
24	Syd Malcolm	1928	1933	6	18	
25	Bob Loudon	1928	1928	1	13	
26	Jimmy Clark	1931	1931	1	5	
27	Dave Cowper	1933	1933	3	9	
28	Alex Ross	1933	1934	3	20	
29	Ron Walden	1936	1936	3	4	
30	Cyril Towers	1937	1937	2	19	
31	Vay Wilson	1938	1938	3	5	
32	Bill McLean	1946	1947	4	5	
33	Phil Hardcastle	1947	1947	1	5	
34	Trevor Allan	1947	1949	10	14	
35	Nev Cottrell	1950	1950	2	14	
36	Keith Winning	1951	1951	1	1	
37	Colin Windon	1951	1951	2	20	
38	John Solomon	1952	1955	8	14	
39	Nicholas Shehadie	1953	1954	3	30	
40	Alan Cameron	1955	1956	4	20	
41	Dick Tooth	1957	1957	2	10	
42	Bob Davidson	1957	1958	6	13	
43	Des Connor	1958	1958	2	12	
44	Chilla Wilson	1958	1958	3	4	
45	Peter Fenwicke	1959	1959	2	6	
46	Ken Catchpole	1961	1968	13	27	
47	Peter Johnson	1962	1968	5	42	
48	Jim Lenehan	1962	1962	1	24	
49	John Thornett	1962	1967	16	37	
50	Greg Davis	1969	1972	16	39	
51	Peter Sullivan	1972	1973	4	13	
52	John Hipwell	1973	1975	9	36	
53	Geoff Shaw	1975	1976	9	27	
54	Tony Shaw	1978	1981	15	36	
55	Mark Loane	1979	1982	6	28	
56	Paul McLean	1980	1980	1	30	
57	Mark Ella	1982	1983	10	25	
58	Andrew Slack	1984	1987	19	39	
59	Steve Williams	1985	1985	5	28	
60	Simon Poidevin	1986	1987	4	59	
61	David Codey	1987	1987	1	13	
62	Michael Lynagh	1987	1995	15	72	
63	Nick Farr-Jones	1988	1992	36	63	
64	Phil Kearns	1992	1995	10	67	
65	Rod McCall	1995	1995	1	71	
66	John Eales	1996	2001	55	86	
67	Tim Horan	1996	1996	1	80	
68	David Wilson	1997	1999	9	79	
69	Jason Little	1999	1999	1	75	
70	George Gregan	2001	2007	59	139	
71	Chris Whitaker	2003	2003	1	31	
72	Nathan Sharpe	2004	2012	10	116	
73	Phil Waugh	2006	2007	3	79	
74	Stirling Mortlock	2006	2009	29	80	
75	George Smith	2007	2009	7	111	
76	Rocky Elsom	2009	2011	24	75	
77	James Horwill	2011	2013	16	62	
78	Will Genia	2011	2013	4	110	
79	David Pocock	2012	2019	9	83	
80	Ben Mowen	2013	2013	6	15	
81	Stephen Moore	2014	2017	26	122	
82	Michael Hooper	2014	2023	69	125	
83	James Slipper	2015	2024	15	154	
84	Dean Mumm	2015	2015	1	57	
85	Allan Alaalatoa	2022	2026	9*	96*	
86	Tate McDermott	2023	2023	1*	57*	
87	Will Skelton	2023	2023	2	37	
88	Dave Porecki	2023	2023	3	21	
89	Liam Wright	2024	2024	1	6	
90	Harry Wilson	2024	incumbent	29*	45*	
91	Fraser McReight	2025	2025	1*	49*	
92	Nick Champion de Crespigny	2025	2025	1	6	
Source: ESPN Scrum: Updated after the Bledisloe Cup series against New Zealand on 19 September 2026.; * Indicates totals for players that are current members of the Wallaby squad.; Players in green remain active and eligible for Wallaby selection.

== See also ==
- List of Australia national rugby union team records
- List of Australia national rugby union team test match results
