= Ken Burke =

- Full name: John Kenneth Burke
- Born: 26 June 1906 Newcastle, NSW, Australia
- Died: 5 October 1966 (aged 60)

Rugby union career
- Position: Fullback
International career
Years	Team	Apps	(Points)
1926, 1929	Australia		

John Kenneth Burke (26 June 1906 – 5 October 1966) was an Australian rugby union player.

Born in Newcastle, Burke learned his rugby during his years at St Joseph's College, Hunters Hill, before finishing his schooling in Bathurst, where he attended St Stanislaus' College.

Burke, a left-footed fullback, joined Wanderers on his return to Newcastle in 1925. He represented a NSW XV which faced the touring 1926 New Zealand team and was a state reserve, backing up Alex Ross during their matches against the All Blacks (which were retrospectively considered Wallabies internationals). Only one fullback was selected for the 1927–28 Waratahs tour, with Ross preferred over Burke. He was a member of an Australian XV in 1929, playing a match against New Zealand, then sat as a Wallabies reserve for the final Test in Sydney.

During World War II, Burke served as a commando in Ethiopia.

== See also ==
- List of Australia national rugby union players
