= Dave Cowper =

Australia international rugby union player

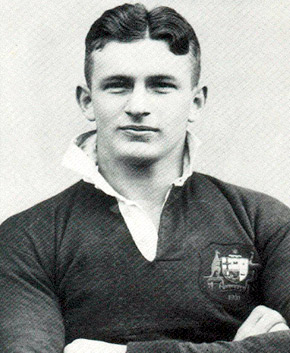
- Born: Denis Lawson Cowper; 28 December 1908 Mosman, New South Wales, Australia
- Died: 5 December 1981 (aged 72)
- School: Newington College
- Notable relatives: Bob Cowper (son); David Cowper (son)

Rugby union career
- Position: Three-quarter
Amateur team(s)
Years	Team	Apps	(Points)
- Northern Suburbs Rugby Club
–	Melbourne Rugby Club		
Provincial / State sides
Years	Team	Apps	(Points)
1930–1935	Victoria		
1934–1935	New South Wales		
International career
Years	Team	Apps	(Points)
1931–1933	Australia	9	(18)
Coaching career
- Years: Team
- 1957–58: Australia

Denis Lawson "Dave" Cowper (28 November 1908 – 5 December 1981) was an Australian national representative rugby union player who captained the Wallabies for six matches including three Tests in 1933. He was the first Victorian player to captain his country in rugby union.

== Club career ==
Born at Mosman, New South Wales Cowper was educated at Newington College in Sydney (1923–1927). He played club rugby with the Northern Suburbs Rugby Club before relocating to Melbourne at age 21 where he continued at the Melbourne Rugby Union Football Club. He trialled for Australia as a sprinter, placing third in the national trials for the 100m held to select a team for the 1932 Summer Olympics.

== Representative career ==
He made his representative debut in 1930 for Victoria against Great Britain scoring three tries in a narrow 36–41 loss. He was then selected in the 1931 full Australian side sent to New Zealand and captained by Syd Malcolm with Cyril Towers and Alex Ross in the senior playing group. They won three, drew one and lost six matches including the single Test. Cowper played in nine of the ten matches, three on the wing and the rest at centre. Cowper scored two tries in his Test debut in the Bledisloe Cup match played at Eden Park and was the second top-scorer of the tour with six tries.

In 1932, he again met the All Blacks in three Test appearances when they came to Australia, scoring tries in two of those fixtures. Howell describes him as having "speed to burn, a great outside swerve, sound in defence and a born leader of men".

In 1933, Cowper was in the squad that made Australia's first ever rugby tour of South Africa. He played in 17 of the 23 games including all five Tests and was the tour top scorer with 34 points from four tries, nine conversions and a dropped goal. He captained Australia in three tour matches and in three Tests, being first honoured as captain in the first Test of the tour when Malcolm and Ross were unavailable through injury. Though born in New South Wales, Cowper at that point became the first Victorian to captain the Wallabies.

He made further state representative appearances for New South Wales and Victoria in 1934 and 1935.

== Coaching career ==
He became an Australian selector and was assistant manager and coach of the squad for the 1957-58 Australia rugby union tour of Britain, Ireland and France. The tour was a disappointment with the Wallabies losing all five Tests. Howell writes that Cowper, "ever the gentleman, never criticised the players, even when he had every right to....he personified the true amateur, playing always to the rules with a strict code of ethics". Squad member Nicholas Shehadie was less complimentary in his published recollections, suggesting Cowper had limited imagination as a coach and their training was "devoid of variety which made it very tedious".

His late son Bob Cowper played Test cricket for Australia in the 1960s.

Preceded by Jimmy Clark	Australian national rugby union captain 1933	Succeeded by Alex Ross
