= Syd Malcolm =

Australia international rugby union player (1902-1987)

Personal information
- Born: Sydney James Malcolm; 10 December 1902 Merewether, New South Wales, Australia
- Died: 23 July 1987 (aged 84)

Playing information
- Weight: 10 st 6 lb (66 kg)
- Position: Half-back
Club
Years	Team	Pld	T	G	FG	P
1925–1926	Ipswich St Pauls
Representative
Years	Team	Pld	T	G	FG	P
1925	Queensland	1

Rugby union career
- Position: Half-back
Amateur team(s)
Years	Team	Apps	(Points)
–	Cook's Hill Surf Club		
–	Newcastle YMCA	6	
Senior career
Years	Team	Apps	(Points)
–	Glebe-Balmain RUFC	12	
–	Manly RUFC	41	
Provincial / State sides
Years	Team	Apps	(Points)
1927-1934	New South Wales	28	
International career
Years	Team	Apps	(Points)
1927-1934	Australia	18	(6)

Syd Malcolm (1902–1987) was an Australian rugby union player, a state and national representative half-back who captained the Wallabies' on seventeen occasions between 1928 and 1933.

== Youth and representative debut ==
Malcolm left Newcastle, New South Wales in his teens to seek work and found it at Ipswich, Queensland as a boilermaker. He played rugby league in 1925–26 with the St Paul's club in Ipswich, achieving representative honours for Queensland in 1925.

His first representative rugby union appearances were on the 1927–28 New South Wales rugby union tour of the British Isles, France and Canada for which Malcolm was one of three half-backs selected along with Wally Meagher and Jack Duncan from Randwick. Meagher started as the preferred Test half and when Malcolm dislocated his shoulder in the match against Oxford University not yet half-way into the tour it looked as though he would have disappointing memories of the trip.

He was sidelined for many matches (ultimately only playing in 11 of the 31 official tour matches) but his capabilities had been noticed. After his shoulder recovery he was selected in the final three Tests against Scotland, England and France. He finished the tour as Australia's number one half-back and returned to Newcastle a hero, but keen to relocate to Sydney to play club rugby there.

== Playing style ==
Malcolm provided quick service from the scrum base with a fast but not particularly long pass. He was quick to spot and exploit an opening but was most respected for his courage and determination when the going got tough. The Howell reference describes him as "courage personified".

== Representative career ==
When the Waratahs toured New Zealand in 1928 Malcolm was named as captain. The team was full of new blood with only Cyril Towers and Geoff Bland continuing on for the 1927 World Tour squad. Syd Malcolm played in seven of the ten matches; five in total were won and five lost.

In 1929 the All Blacks toured Australia, Tom Lawton took over as captain but Syd Malcolm was in the side that won all three Tests in an upset. With the Queensland Rugby Union now back in existence for the first time since 1919 this was the first truly national Wallabies side fielded since 1914 and the first time in history any nation had beaten the All Blacks in a 3–0 series whitewash.

Great Britain toured Australia in 1930 and Malcolm played in two tests and twice against them for New South Wales. Then in 1931 a full Australian side was sent to New Zealand. Syd Malcolm was the captain and part of the senior playing group with Cyril Towers and Alex Ross from the 1927 side. They won three, drew one and lost six matches including the single Test. In 1932 Malcolm again met the All Blacks in three Test appearances when they came to Australia – he was captain in one of those encounters but also captained New South Wales against them.

Malcolm & Tom Perrin

In 1933, Malcolm was in the squad that made Australia's first ever rugby tour of South Africa. He made eleven appearances including two Tests, one as captain. Syd Malcolm made his final international appearances against New Zealand in 1934, finishing his representative career after eight years and forty five internationals including eighteen Tests.

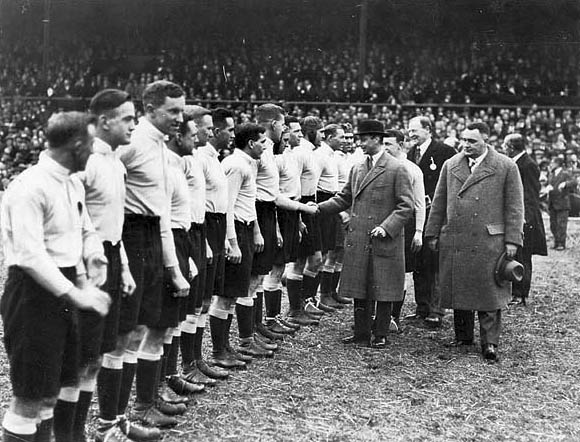
Malcolm, last in line to meet the Duke of York before Twickenham Test Jan 1928

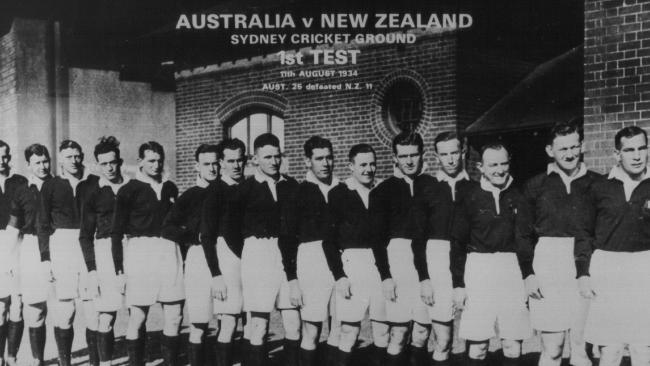
Malcolm (3rd from right) with victorious Bledisloe Wallabies, 1st Test Aug 1934

Preceded by Johnnie Wallace	Australian national rugby union captain 1928-33	Succeeded by Bob Loudon
