= Ted Thorn =

Australia international rugby union player

- Born: Edward Joseph Thorn c. 1896 Sydney
- School: Manly High School

Rugby union career
Amateur team(s)
Years	Team	Apps	(Points)
	Manly RUFC	78	
Provincial / State sides
Years	Team	Apps	(Points)
1921–28	New South Wales	44	
International career
Years	Team	Apps	(Points)
1922–26	Waratahs	15	(5)

Edward Joseph "Ted" Thorn (born c. 1896) was an Australian rugby union player, a state and national representative flanker who made 36 appearances for the Waratahs. He played in fifteen Test matches and was captaining the national side on thirteen occasions (six Test matches) between 1924 and 1926.

== Rugby career ==
Thorn, a flanker, was born in Sydney and claimed a total of fifteen international rugby caps for Australia. His brother Joe, though Ted's junior by three years, represented the Waratahs first in 1921. Ted made his state representative debut in 1922, appearing three times for the New South Wales Waratahs against the visiting All Blacks for two victories. With no Queensland Rugby Union competition in place at that time, the New South Wales Waratahs were the top Australian representative rugby union side of the period and a number of Waratah matches of the 1920s played against full international opponents were in 1986 decreed by the Australian Rugby Union as Test matches – including fifteen such appearances made by Ted Thorn.

Thorn made the 1923 New South Wales tour of New Zealand playing in every one of the ten tour matches. Although the tour was not a success with only two matches being won, Thorn returned with his reputation intact. In 1924 when the All Blacks visited Australia, Thorn played in all three matches and in the final match he debuted as captain for the Waratahs, now in the record books as national captain. In the 1925 season he again captained New South Wales in two Tests against New Zealand, withdrawing with injury from the third match of the series. On the tour to New Zealand later that year he was selected as tour captain and played in the first seven matches before a wrist injury saw him stand down from the Test, passing the captaincy to Tom Lawton.

Preceded by Billy Sheehan (rugby)	Australian national rugby union captain 1924–26	Succeeded by Charlie Fox
