= Arthur Finlay =

Arthur Finlay may refer to:

- Arthur Finlay (rugby, born 1854), Scottish rugby player
- Arthur Finlay (rugby union, born 1903), Australian international rugby union player

== See also ==
- Arthur Findlay (1883–1964), writer, accountant, stockbroker, magistrate, and Spiritualist
