= Bob Loudon =

Australia international rugby union player (1903-1991)

- Born: Robert Briton Loudon; 24 March 1903 Leeston NZ
- Died: 6 October 1991 (aged 88)
- Height: 6 ft 2 in (1.88 m)
- Weight: 14 st 4 lb (91 kg)
- School: Sydney Grammar School
- Notable relative: Darby Loudon (brother)

Rugby union career
- Position(s): Versatile back Flanker
Amateur team(s)
Years	Team	Apps	(Points)
- GPS Old Boys
–	North Sydney RUFC		
–	Manly RUFC		
Provincial / State sides
Years	Team	Apps	(Points)
1923-34	New South Wales	23	
International career
Years	Team	Apps	(Points)
1923-34	Australia	13	(12)

Robert Briton Loudon (24 March 1903 – 6 October 1991) was a New Zealand born rugby union player, a flanker who made twenty-three representative appearances for the New South Wales state team in the 1920s. Seven of these matches have since been decreed as Test matches by the Australian Rugby Union and Loudon, who led the side in one such match in 1928, was therefore a captain of the Australian national team. After rugby union restarted in Queensland in 1929, and national selections were made from the two states Loudon played in six further full Australian Wallaby Test sides. In addition to his thirteen Test matches he made a further twenty-one tour match appearances for representative Australian sides on three international tours between 1923 and 1933.

== Rugby career ==
Loudon, was born in Leeston, New Zealand and initially attended Christ's College, Christchurch. He relocated to Sydney during his youth and attended Sydney Grammar School. He was proficient in competitive Surf Life Saving at Sydney's Manly Beach and stroked the Manly Surf Club boat to win the national championship in 1927-28.

Loudon made his representative debut on the New South Wales tour to New Zealand in 1923 as a versatile back. He played in eight of the ten matches, including three Tests (one as a replacement). He appeared on tour as a centre, fullback and winger. With no Queensland Rugby Union administration or competition in place from 1919 to 1929, the New South Wales Waratahs were the top Australian representative rugby union side of the period and a number of their 1920s fixtures played against full international opposition were decreed by the Australian Rugby Union in 1986 as official Test matches. Loudon made six such appearances against New Zealand XVs and one against a New Zealand Māori rugby union team on two tours to New Zealand. By his second tour of 1928 Loudon was a specialist flanker. He captained the Waratahs side in the second Test match of that 1928 series as well as in two tour games and thus qualifies as an Australian national rugby union team captain.

Howell asserts that Loudon was a certainty for the 1927–28 Waratahs tour of the British Isles, France and Canada and would have earned a more highly regarded name in Australian rugby folklore but for the fact that he declared himself unavailable for the tour.

He made a Test appearance in 1929 again opposite New Zealand and then in 1933 was selected for the first-ever Wallaby tour of South Africa. He played in four Tests on tour and in 10 other minor matches. In 1934 he made further state representative appearances for New South Wales and played his final Test match, all against New Zealand in Sydney.

His brother Darby Loudon also represented for Australia in rugby union and captained the national side. Bob and Darby were the first pairs of brothers to captain their country in international rugby.

Preceded by Syd Malcolm	Australian national rugby union captain 1928	Succeeded by Jimmy Clark
