= Alan Thorpe =

Alan Thorpe may refer to:

- Alan Thorpe (rugby union), Australian rugby union player
- Alan Thorpe (footballer) (born 1968), Australian rules footballer and media commentator
