= Fergus Keogh =

Irish rugby union player

- Full name: Fergus Stephen Keogh
- Born: 28 June 1939 Dublin, Ireland
- Died: 29 March 2010 (aged 70) Bangkok, Thailand

Rugby union career
- Position: Fullback
International career
| Years | Team | Apps | (Points) |
| 1964 | Ireland | 2 | (6) |

Fergus Stephen Keogh (28 June 1939 – 29 March 2010) was an Irish international rugby union player.

A fullback, Keogh was a renowned goal-kicker and played his rugby with Bective Rangers. He was capped twice by Ireland in the 1964 Five Nations, marking his against Wales at Lansdowne Road with two penalties goals.

Keogh immigrated to Australia with his family in 1967 and played for Sydney club Western Suburbs. He later settled on the Queensland Sunshine Coast and died in 2010 while in Thailand, aged 70.

== See also ==
- List of Ireland national rugby union players
