= Ron Walden =

Australian rugby union player (1907–1985)

- Born: Ronald John Walden; August 27, 1907 Quambone, New South Wales
- Died: April 12, 1985 (aged 77) Sydney
- Height: 5 ft 11 in (1.80 m)
- Weight: 14 st 6 lb (91.6 kg)
- School: Dubbo High
- Occupation: Police Detective

Rugby union career
- Position: Front-rower
Senior career
Years	Team	Apps	(Points)
	Manly RUFC	127	
Provincial / State sides
Years	Team	Apps	(Points)
1923–1937	New South Wales	24	
International career
Years	Team	Apps	(Points)
1934–1936	Australia	4	

Ron Walden (27 August 1907 – 12 April 1985) was an Australian state and national representative rugby union player who captained the Wallabies in three Test matches in 1936.

== Career ==
Born in New South Wales' central-west in the small village of Quambone, Walden was schooled at Dubbo High School before his family moved to Manly in Sydney. His club rugby career was played in its entirety with the Manly club.

He made a representative appearance for New South Wales against the visiting All Blacks of 1934 and was then selected in the national side for the second Test of 1934 against those same tourists after Weary Dunlop withdrew from the team with influenza. His Australian Test debut was made in the second-row at the Sydney Cricket Ground in a match which Australia tied 3–3. Coming after the surprise Australian victory of the first Test, this resulted in Australia's first ever series victory over New Zealand to claim the Bledisloe Cup.

In 1935, Walden made three appearances for Australia against the visiting New Zealand Māori rugby union team and the following year he was selected as vice-captain of the Australian squad which was to tour New Zealand. Walden played in all ten matches of the tour, the only tourist to achieve this feat. When tour captain Dooney Hayes was side-line with injury, Walden took on the match captaincy duties. He captained his country in three Tests and four tour matches while delivering excellent match performances based around his tight forward play.

He made further state appearances for New South Wales but not for Australia. In 1949, long retired as a player, he toured New Zealand as manager of the Wallaby side captained by Trevor Allen. This team was the first to win the Bledisloe Cup in a series played in New Zealand.

Outside of football Walden was a policeman who rose through the ranks to become Chief of the New South Wales Criminal Investigation Branch. As Superintendent Ron Walden he had a senior role in the investigation into the 1960 kidnapping of Sydney schoolboy Graeme Thorne.

Preceded by Alex Ross	Australian national rugby union captain 1936	Succeeded by Cyril Towers
