= Darby Loudon =

Australia international rugby union player (1897-1963)

- Born: Darby Briton Loudon; 12 March 1897 Leeston NZ
- Died: c. 1963
- School: Sydney Grammar School
- University: Sydney University
- Notable relative: Bob Loudon (brother)
- Occupation: Medical practitioner

Rugby union career
- Position: flanker
Amateur team(s)
Years	Team	Apps	(Points)
- Sydney Uni
–	North Sydney RUFC		
–	GPS Old Boys		
Provincial / State sides
Years	Team	Apps	(Points)
1919–22	New South Wales	16	
International career
Years	Team	Apps	(Points)
1921–22	Australia	4	(5)

Darby Briton Loudon (12 March 1897 – c. 1963) was a New Zealand born rugby union player, a flanker who made sixteen representative appearances for the New South Wales state team in the 1920s. Four of these matches have since been decreed as Test matches by the Australian Rugby Union and Loudon, who led the side in one such match in 1922, was therefore a captain of the Australian national team.

== Rugby career ==
Loudon, was born in Leeston, New Zealand and relocated to Sydney during his youth. He attended Sydney Grammar School and gained entry to Sydney University to study medicine. The Sydney club rugby competition started up again after World War I in 1919 and Loudon was captain of the Sydney University Football Club the premiership winners, also winning himself a University Blue that year. He captained the side in matches against an AIF Rugby XV who toured NSW and Queensland and led by former Wallaby Lieutenant Willie Watson did much to rekindle public attention in rugby union in the Australian eastern states.

Loudon made his representative debut on the New South Wales tour to New Zealand in 1921, playing in nine of the ten tour matches scoring two tries, nine conversions and four penalty goals for 36 points, the second top-scorer of the squad. With no Queensland Rugby Union administration or competition in place from 1919 to 1929, the New South Wales Waratahs were the top Australian representative rugby union side of the period and a number of their 1920s fixtures played against full international opposition were decreed by the Australian Rugby Union in 1986 as official Test matches. Thus Loudon's appearance against a New Zealand XV at Lancaster Park in September 1921 marked his international Test rugby debut. So decreed also were the three matches Loudon played for New South Wales in 1922 when a New Zealand Māori rugby union team toured to Sydney. He captained the side in the second match of that series, thus qualifying as an Australian national rugby union team captain with four international rugby caps appearances to his credit.

Preceded by Wakka Walker	Australian national rugby union captain 1922	Succeeded by Watty Friend
