= Keith Storey (rugby union) =

Rugby player (1912–1998)

- Full name: Keith Parnell Storey
- Born: 6 September 1912 Strathfield, NSW, Australia
- Died: 25 January 1998 (aged 85)
- Notable relative: Geoff Storey (brother)

Rugby union career
- Position: Fullback
International career
Years	Team	Apps	(Points)
1936	Australia	1	(0)

Keith Parnell Storey (6 September 1912 — 25 January 1998) was an Australian rugby union international.

Storey, younger brother of Wallabies lock Geoff, was born in Sydney and educated at Sydney Grammar School, playing in the undefeated 1929 1st XV premiership team. He made his first-grade debut for Western Suburbs in 1931.

Capped once for the Wallabies, Storey was a member of the 1936 tour of New Zealand and played the 2nd Test against the All Blacks in Dunedin, as a fullback. He retired the following year due to a serious knee ligament injury.

== See also ==
- List of Australia national rugby union players
