= Colin Laird =

England international rugby union player

- Full name: Henri Colin Campbell Laird
- Born: 3 September 1908 London, England
- Died: 3 October 1971 (aged 63) St Marylebone, England

Rugby union career
- Position: Stand-off
International career
Years	Team	Apps	(Points)
1927–29	England	10	(15)

Henri Colin Campbell Laird (3 September 1908 – 3 October 1971) was an English international rugby union player.

Born in London, Laird was educated at The Nautical College, Pangbourne.

Laird, a stand-off, became the youngest player to be capped for England when he debuted in their 1927 Five Nations opener against Wales at Twickenham aged 18 and 124 days, chosen to partner his Harlequins teammate John Worton. A month later, Laird set another England age record by scoring a try in a win over Ireland.

In 1928, Laird played all four matches of England's Five Nations grand slam, combining to success with Arthur Young. He scored a try in England's final match against Scotland as they secured the grand slam with a 6–0 win.

== See also ==
- List of England national rugby union players
