= John Worton =

England international rugby union player

- Full name: Joseph Robert Bute Worton
- Born: 31 March 1901 Fulham, England
- Died: 14 January 1991 (aged 89) SW Surrey, England

Rugby union career
- Position: Scrum-half
International career
Years	Team	Apps	(Points)
1926–27	England	2	(0)

Joseph Robert Bute Worton (31 March 1901 – 14 January 1991) was an English international rugby union player.

Educated at Haileybury, Worton went to Sandhurst after finishing his schooling and in 1922 was gazetted into the Middlesex Regiment, serving periods in Belfast and occupied Germany.

Worton was a scrum-half with the Army and Harlequins sides. He stood in for Arthur Young as England scrum-half on two occasions, gaining caps in matches against Wales in 1926 and 1927.

== See also ==
- List of England national rugby union players
