= Rob Lawton =

- Full name: Robert Anthony Lawton
- Born: 25 January 1964 (age 62) Terengganu, Malaysia
- Height: 6 ft 0 in (183 cm)
- Weight: 252 lb (114 kg)

Rugby union career
- Position: Prop
International career
Years	Team	Apps	(Points)
1988	Australia	4	(0)

Robert Anthony Lawton (born 25 January 1964) is an Australian former rugby union international.

Born in Malaysia, Lawton is the grandson of former Wallabies captain Tom Lawton Snr and was raised in Queensland, attending both Brisbane Grammar School and The Southport School. He played first-grade for Brisbane club Souths.

Lawton, a prop, was capped four times for the Wallabies in 1988. He made his debut in a win over England at Ballymore, partnering his elder brother Tom in the forward line, then featured in a further two home Tests against the All Blacks, before making his final appearance against Scotland at Murrayfield on the end of year tour.

== See also ==
- List of Australia national rugby union players
