= Billy Mann (rugby union) =

- Full name: William Heath Mann
- Born: 12 June 1908 Sydney, NSW, Australia
- Died: 9 July 1965 (aged 57) near Bathurst, NSW, Australia
- School: Sydney Grammar School
- University: University of Sydney

Rugby union career
- Position: Winger
International career
Years	Team	Apps	(Points)
1927–28	Australia		

William Heath Mann (12 June 1908 – 9 July 1965) was an Australian international rugby union player.

Mann was educated at Sydney Grammar School and the University of Sydney, where he studied law.

A winger, Mann was playing for Sydney University in 1927 when he got selected by New South Wales for their upcoming tour of the British Isles, France and Canada, which retrospectively came to be considered a full national team tour as the Waratahs were the top Australian representative at the time. He featured in a total of 10 uncapped tour matches, scoring 10 tries, but didn't play against any of the international sides.

Mann had to retire at the age of 20 due to a torn knee cartilage and became a solicitor in Sydney.

In 1965, Mann was killed in a traffic accident on the Mitchell Highway near Bathurst, when a car being driven by his wife ran off the road and crashed. His wife survived with minor injuries.

== See also ==
- List of Australia national rugby union players
