= Mick Ellem =

Michael Anthony Ellem
- Born: 10 July 1952 Sydney

Rugby union career
Amateur team(s)
Years	Team	Apps	(Points)
- Western Suburbs
Provincial / State sides
Years	Team	Apps	(Points)
1975–1978	Sydney Rugby Union, New South Wales		
International career
Years	Team	Apps	(Points)
1976	Wallabies	1	(0)

Michael Anthony Ellem (born 10 July 1952) was a rugby union fullback who represented Australia.

Ellem played for Western Suburbs (now West Harbour) in the Sydney Rugby Union 1st Division competition. He earned his first representative honour playing for New South Wales against Wellington in July 1975. He retained his spot for the match against arch-rivals Queensland the following week.

Ellem missed selection for the Sydney team that played Fiji in 1976, and was selected on the reserves bench for New South Wales, but got his chance due to an early injury to first choice fullback Jim Hindmarsh. Ellem impressed in New South Wales' 37–6 victory.

Ellem was selected in the Australian squad for the test series against Fiji in 1976, but did not earn a cap until the third and final test of the series, coming on as a reserve. In doing so, he became the second Wests player since World War II to represent Australia. Shortly after taking the field, the Fijian team walked off the field, after their captain was sent off. After the resumption, Australia went on to win the game 27–19.

Ellem was selected for Sydney's tour of Japan, Canada, the United Kingdom and Russia, and was fullback for Sydney's 1978 team which defeated Wales 18–16.

Ellem continued played for Wests for a number of years following, before retiring to coach Wests.

To honour Ellem, the West Harbour player of the year award is named in Ellem's honour.
