= Eric E. Ford =

Eric Ford
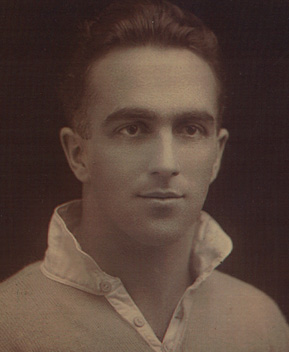
- Born: Eric Excell Ford; 21 July 1904 Launceston, Tasmania
- Died: c. 1986 (age 82-83)
- School: St Joseph's College
- Notable relative: Jack Ford

Rugby union career
Senior career
Years	Team	Apps	(Points)
- Glebe-Balmain
Provincial / State sides
Years	Team	Apps	(Points)
- New South Wales
International career
Years	Team	Apps	(Points)
1927–29	Australia	7	(12)

Eric Excell Ford (21 July 1904 – c. 1986) was a rugby union player who represented Australia.

Ford, a wing, was born in Launceston, Tasmania and claimed a total of 7 international rugby caps for Australia. His brother Jack was also an Australian rugby union representative player. The elder brother of perhaps the more famous Jack Ford, Eric Ford was himself a star for both New South Wales and Australia in his own right.

== Family and early life ==
Eric Ford was the son of a publican father who died when Eric was only six years of age, when the family had to move to Sydney. He began his early football career playing Australian Rules but switched to rugby when he and his brothers Jack and Percy went to St. Joseph's College at Hunters Hill in Sydney. They all had the unique benefit of learning the game from the remarkable Brother Henry.

== Rugby career ==
On leaving school, with his brothers, he joined the Glebe-Balmain Club and was a member of the club's 1925 Sydney Premiership winning team. He was first selected for New South Wales in 1926. Troubled by frequent knee problems throughout his career, he nevertheless played on without demur and in 1929 won the New South Wales Rugby Union Sprint Championship.

Eric Ford was selected for the 1927–28 Waratahs tour of the British Isles, France and Canada and appeared in all five internationals. Like brother Jack, he was an intuitive 'reader' of the game, coupled with a fine positional sense which allowed him to always be on hand to finish in fine style any break which had been made. He was good under the high ball and had splendid hands.

He played his last two Tests in 1929 when the Australians won all three games against the All Blacks. Eric Ford, a modest man and quiet achiever, additionally played 68 first grade games for his club and featured in two premiership finals.

== Recognition ==
Quiet and reserved, he was one of the great achievers in the famous 1927-28 Waratah tour to Great Britain, France and North America, with a total of 15 tries from 21 matches, equalled only by the great Cyril Towers.

== Personal ==
Ford married Gwen Hartigan on 4 February 1937. Hartigan was a daughter of railways commissioner Thomas J. Hartigan and sister of tennis champion Joan Hartigan.

== Published sources ==
- Howell, Max (2006) Born to Lead - Wallaby Test Captains (2005) Celebrity Books, New Zealand
