= Charlie Fox (rugby union) =

Australian rugby union player

- Born: Charles Leigh Fox; 27 July 1898 Waverley, New South Wales
- Died: January 1985 Sydney
- Height: 6 ft 1 in (185 cm)
- Weight: 13 st 7 lb (189 lb; 86 kg)
- School: Sydney Grammar School

Rugby union career
- Position: lock
Senior career
| Years | Team | Apps | (Points) |
| 1918 | GPS Old Boys | 8 | |
| 1919 - ? | Glebe-Balmain RUFC | 40 | |
| ? -1927 | North Sydney RUFC | 40 | |
Provincial / State sides
| Years | Team | Apps | (Points) |
| 1920-28 | New South Wales | 35 | |
International career
| Years | Team | Apps | (Points) |
| 1920–28 | Wallabies | 17 | (6) |

Charlie Fox (27 July 1898 – January 1985) was an Australian rugby union player, a state and national representative second-rower who made 36 appearances for the Wallabies, playing in 17 Test matches and captained the national side on seven occasions (one Test match) in 1925.

== Representative career ==
Charles Fox was twenty-one years of age and playing for the Glebe-Balmain Club in Sydney when he was selected in 1919 to play in an invitation Australian XV against an AIF side, a match which marked a re-kindling of interest in rugby union in Sydney following WWI.

In 1920 he appeared three times for the New South Wales Waratahs against the All Blacks scoring a try in his representative debut. With no Queensland Rugby Union competition in place at that time the New South Wales Waratahs were the top Australian representative rugby union side of the period and a number of Waratah matches of the 1920s played against full international opponents were in 1986 decreed by the Australian Rugby Union as Test matches.

In 1921 he represented for New South Wales against the visiting Springboks and was selected to tour New Zealand. He played in seven matches on tour including the Waratah's Test victory.

He made representative appearances in 1922 against the New Zealand Maori and the All Blacks, played in three Tests against them in 1924 and in five matches against them in 1925. The 3rd test of 1925 played on 23 June at the Sydney Showground was Fox's sole appearance as the national captain. He was solid in further Test appearances against New Zealand in 1926.

He was a tremendous lineout forward and one of the senior players for the 1927–28 Waratahs tour of Britain, France and Canada, picked as the tour's vice-captain under Johnnie Wallace. He played in ten of the first thirteen games of the trip until he suffered a severe leg injury in the tour match loss to Oxford University RFC. He was captain in that Oxford game and with no substitutes allowed, the Waratahs played the second half with 14 men and lost to the students 0–3. He recovered for the last four matches including the international against France where Fox at least enjoyed a Test match victory.

He retired at the end of Waratahs tour.

| Preceded by Ted Thorn | Australian national rugby union captain 1925 | Succeeded by Tom Lawton, Snr |
