= Ken Tarleton =

- Born: Kenneth Tarleton; 30 October 1900 North Sydney, New South Wales
- Died: December 1984 Sydney

Rugby union career
- Position: hooker
International career
Years	Team	Apps	(Points)
1925	Wallabies	2	(0)

Kenneth Tarleton (30 October 1900 – December 1984) was a rugby union player who represented Australia.

Tarleton, a hooker, was born in North Sydney, New South Wales and claimed a total of 2 international rugby caps for Australia.
