= Keith Storey (footballer) =

Australian rules footballer (1905–1979)

Personal information
- Full name: Keith Wellwood Storey
- Born: 15 May 1905; South Melbourne, Victoria
- Died: 6 August 1979 (aged 74); New South Wales
- Original team: Brighton (VFA)

Playing career^{1}
Years	Club	Games (Goals)
1930	St Kilda	5 (0)
- ^{1} Playing statistics correct to the end of 1930.

Keith Storey (15 May 1905 – 6 August 1979) was an Australian rules footballer who played with St Kilda in the Victorian Football League (VFL).
