= Malcolm Blair =

Australian rugby player (1905–1963)

- Full name: Malcolm Rignall Blair
- Born: 8 March 1905 Rockhampton, QLD, Australia
- Died: 12 August 1963 (aged 58)
- School: Sydney Grammar School

Rugby union career
- Position: Prop
International career
Years	Team	Apps	(Points)
1928–31	Australia	3	(0)

Malcolm Rignall Blair (8 March 1905 — 12 August 1963) was an Australian rugby union international.

A native of Rockhampton, Queensland, Blair was the youngest son of John Blair, an influential local journalist who was a proprietor of The Morning Bulletin. He was educated at Sydney Grammar School, where he won a GPS premiership with the 1st XV in 1924, then after school played first-grade rugby for Western Suburbs.

Blair, a compact front-row forward, made the 1927–28 New South Wales tour of the British Isles and France. He played against one international opponent on the tour, France in Paris, a match which was retrospectively awarded Test status, to reflect the fact the Waratahs were the country's only representative team at the time. In 1931, Morton toured New Zealand with the Wallabies, gaining further Test caps in one-off matches against New Zealand Māori and the All Blacks.

== See also ==
- List of Australia national rugby union players
