= Jack Duncan (rugby union) =

- Born: John L. Duncan c. 1900 Sydney
- Died: c. 1969

Rugby union career
- Position: scrum-half
Amateur team(s)
Years	Team	Apps	(Points)
- Randwick
International career
Years	Team	Apps	(Points)
1926	Wallabies	1	(0)

John L. Duncan (c. 1900 – c. 1969) was a rugby union player who represented Australia.

Duncan, a scrum-half, was born in Sydney and claimed 1 international rugby cap for Australia.
