= Harry Woods (rugby union) =

Australian rugby union player (1903–1972)

- Born: Harold Francis Woods; 3 September 1903 Boulder, Western Australia
- Died: c. 1972
- School: St Joseph's College

Rugby union career
- Position: prop
International career
Years	Team	Apps	(Points)
1925–28	Wallabies	8	(3)

Harold Francis Woods (3 September 1903 – c. 1972) was a rugby union player who represented Australia.

Woods, a prop, was born in Boulder, Western Australia and claimed a total of 8 international rugby caps for Australia.

== Published sources ==
- Howell, Max (2006) Born to Lead – Wallaby Test Captains (2005) Celebrity Books, New Zealand
