= Cam Gordon (rugby union) =

- Born: George Campbell Gordon; 11 September 1903 Bowral
- Died: September 27, 1992 (aged 89 years 41 days)

Rugby union career
- Position: wing
Amateur team(s)
Years	Team	Apps	(Points)
- Western Suburbs
–	Newcastle YMCA		
International career
Years	Team	Apps	(Points)
1929	Wallabies	1	(3)

George Campbell Gordon (born 11 September 1903) was a rugby union player who represented Australia.

Gordon, a wing, was born in Bowral and claimed 1 international rugby cap for Australia.
