= Syd King (rugby union) =

Australian rugby player (1905–1970)

- Full name: Sydney Charles King
- Born: 21 March 1905 Sydney, Australia
- Died: 30 March 1970 (aged 65)
- School: Sydney Boys High School

Rugby union career
- Position: Centre
International career
Years	Team	Apps	(Points)
1926–32	Australia	14	(6)

Sydney Charles King (21 March 1905 — 30 March 1970) was an Australian rugby union international.

Educated at Sydney Boys High School, King was their 1st XV captain in 1924 and played halfback on the Combined GPX XV. He played first-grade rugby for Western Suburbs and in 1925 toured New Zealand with New South Wales.

King, capped 14 times at Test level, made his international debut playing for New South Wales against a visiting New Zealand XV in 1926, a series of matches which were retrospectively awarded Test status. He played his international rugby as an inside centre, with his defensive game complimenting the more attacking centre partner Cyril Towers.

After serving as a state and national selector, King became a sports journalist, writing in newspapers and journals.

== See also ==
- List of Australia national rugby union players
