= Jack Ford (rugby union) =

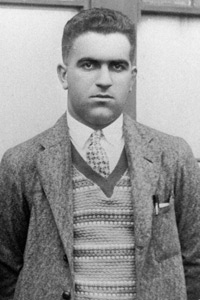
- Born: John Alfred Ford; 17 February 1906 Sheffield, Tasmania
- Died: 20 February 1985 (aged 79) Sydney
- School: St Joseph's College
- Notable relative: Eric Ford

Rugby union career
- Position: number eight
Senior career
Years	Team	Apps	(Points)
1924–30	Glebe-Balmain	65	
International career
Years	Team	Apps	(Points)
1925–30	Wallabies	11	(12)

John Alfred Ford (17 February 1906 – 20 February 1985) was a rugby union player who represented Australia.

Ford, a number eight, was born in Sheffield, Tasmania and claimed a total of 11 international rugby caps for Australia. His brother Eric was also an Australian rugby union representative player.

== Family and early life ==
One of three children, his publican father died when Jack was aged four and the family moved from Tasmania to Sydney. Together with his brothers Eric and Percy, Jack Ford became a boarder at St Joseph's College where he learned his rugby under the guidance of the legendary Brother Henry. He was a good student and won a College bursary which allowed him to attend College for a total of eight years. He was an outstanding cricketer and boxer while at school and matured to an ideal physique for all these sports.

== Rugby career ==
After leaving school, he joined the Glebe-Balmain Club with his brothers. At 20 he made his debut for NSW against New Zealand and made an immediate impression with his explosive running, which led to his selection in the 1927–28 Waratahs tour of the British Isles, France and Canada. On that tour, among a veritable firmament of rugby stars, Ford stood out for his great vision, which identified opposition weaknesses. When the Waratahs were within striking distance, canny captain Johnnie Wallace, Ford's team-mate at Glebe-Balmain, invariably pulled Jack Ford out of the pack to play at second five-eighth. With his flashing speed, immense strength and sheer size (he was by far the biggest man in the Waratah team), he was virtually unstoppable and scored twelve tries from this tactic in twenty-four matches on tour as well as setting up many more for others to score after he had made the break.

Jack Ford's career continued in 1929 when he played for the first Australian team to win all internationals against New Zealand. In a great Australian pack, his was the stroke of genius and he scored tries in each of the final two Tests with his pace, strength and uncanny ability to read the game.

He retired in 1930, a winner in eight of his last nine Tests after Australia's win over the 1930 British Lions. He had played in addition to all his representative games, a total of 65 games for Glebe-Balmain and Drummoyne. The Welsh Rugby Union sent him a set of scarlet red jumpers to mark the change in the Club name from Glebe-Balmain to Drummoyne and the Club still plays in those scarlet colours to this day.

== Recognition ==
In 1999, for the 125th Anniversary Celebration of the foundation of the New South Wales Rugby Union in the Southern Hemisphere, a panel of experts was asked to select the best XV that had ever appeared for New South Wales and Australia. Without exception, Jack Ford's name came up as the greatest ever number eight.

He was inducted into the Australian Rugby Hall of Fame in 2016.

== Published sources ==
- Howell, Max (2006) Born to Lead — Wallaby Test Captains (2005) Celebrity Books, New Zealand
