= Allen Bowers =

- Born: Allen John A. Bowers; 27 October 1902 Darlinghurst, New South Wales

Rugby union career
- Position: wing
Senior career
Years	Team	Apps	(Points)
- Eastern Suburbs
–	Randwick		
International career
Years	Team	Apps	(Points)
1923–27	Wallabies	7	(12)

Allen John A. Bowers (born 27 October 1902) was a rugby union player who represented Australia.

Bowers, a wing, was born in Darlinghurst, New South Wales and claimed a total of 7 international rugby caps for Australia.
