= Allan Buchanan (rugby union) =

Rugby union player from Northern Ireland

- Full name: Allan McMillan Buchanan
- Born: 21 May 1904
- Died: 24 November 1956 (aged 52) Barnet, England
- School: Portora Royal School
- University: Trinity College Dublin

Rugby union career
- Position: Prop
International career
Years	Team	Apps	(Points)
1926–27	Ireland	6	(0)

Allan McMillan Buchanan (21 May 1904 — 24 November 1956) was an Irish international rugby union player.

Raised in Ulster, Buchanan attended Portora Royal School, where he was involved in several sports. He set a long-standing school record for the one mile race during his time there. An Ulster Schools rugby representative, Buchanan continued with rugby at Trinity College and captained Dublin University to the 1927–28 Leinster Senior Cup title.

Buchanan, a front row forward, was capped six times for Ireland across the 1926 and 1927 Five Nations Championships, which they jointly won with Scotland both years, as well as a match against a touring Australian side.

A bursar at The Leys School in Cambridge, Buchanan was killed in a car accident in 1956 while on his way home from watching a rugby match at Twickenham. He was 52 years of age.

== See also ==
- List of Ireland national rugby union players
