= Charles Hanrahan =

Irish rugby union player

- Full name: Charles J. Hanrahan
- Born: 1903 Clonmel, Co. Tipperary, Ireland
- Died: 28 February 1969 Cork, Co. Cork Ireland

Rugby union career
- Position: Prop / No. 8
International career
| Years | Team | Apps | (Points) |
| 1926–32 | Ireland | 20 | (3) |

Charles J. Hanrahan (1903 — 1969) was an Irish international rugby union player.

Hanrahan was born in Clonmel played for Cork-based club Dolphin RFC. He was capped 20 times for Ireland between 1926 and 1932, utilised primarily as a front row forward. A bank manager by profession, Hanrahan served on the IRFU selection committee for the 1948 grand slam and was elected the union's president in 1954.

== See also ==
- List of Ireland national rugby union players
