= Ted Greatorex =

- Born: Edward Neville Greatorex; 30 July 1901 Leichhardt, New South Wales, Australia
- Died: 1964
- Occupation: Journalist

Rugby union career
- Position: flanker
International career
Years	Team	Apps	(Points)
1923–28	Wallabies	8	(15)

Edward Neville Greatorex (30 July 1901 – 16 July 1964) was a rugby union player who represented Australia.

Greatorex, a flanker, was born in Leichhardt and claimed a total of 8 international rugby caps for Australia. He played for the Y.M.C.A. Rugby Club in Sydney for over 10 years.

E.N.Greatorex was married to the noted Australian poet and journalist Elizabeth Riddell. The couple married in Sydney in 1935.

Ted Greatorex was a noted newspaper journalist at the Daily Mirror (Australia) and Reuters.

He died from a massive stroke at his home in Vaucluse, New South Wales in 1964.
