= James Richardson (sportsman) =

English cricketer and rugby union player

James Vere Richardson (16 December 1903 – 1 May 1995) was an English sportsman who played cricket and rugby union. He was born in Prenton, Cheshire, and went to Uppingham School.

As a cricketer he was active from 1924 to 1926 and played for Oxford University in the University Match in 1925 and for Essex between 1924 and 1926. He was born in Prenton, Cheshire and died in Surrey. He appeared in 35 first-class matches as a righthanded batsman who bowled right arm medium pace. He scored 1,038 runs with a highest score of 89 and took 27 wickets with a best performance of three for 25.

As a rugby player Richardson played for Oxford in The Varsity Match in 1925, making him a double blue, and he played five times for the England team in 1928, scoring one try. He was never on the losing side in his England games, being part of the side which won the Grand Slam in the 1928 Five Nations Championship.
