= Edward Stanbury =

England international rugby union player

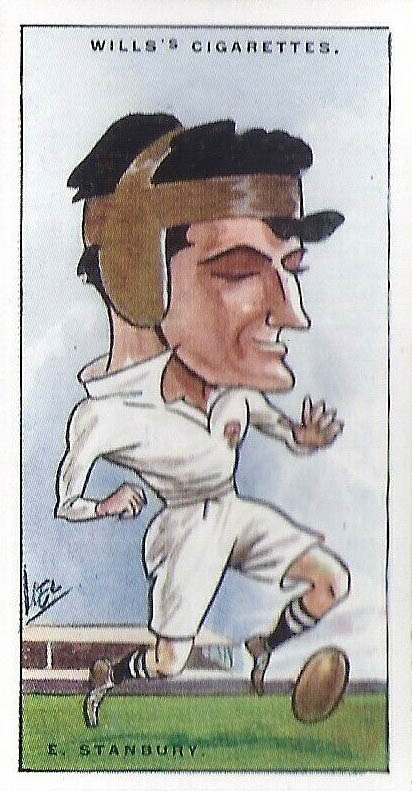
- Born: 29 August 1897 Plympton, Devon
- Died: 1 May 1968 (aged 70) Plympton, Devon

Rugby union career
- Position: Forward
International career
| Years | Team | Apps | (Points) |
| 1926–29 | England | 16 | (13) |

Edward Stanbury (29 August 1897 – 1 May 1968) was an English international rugby union player.

Born in Plympton, Devon, Stanbury was a regular member of the England sides of the late 1920s, utilised as a forward in all three rows of the scrum, as well as an occasional goal-kicker. He gained 16 England caps.

Stanbury played his club rugby for Plymouth Albion and made 40 representative appearances with Devon.

During the 1950s, Stanbury had a three-year term as president of Devon Rugby Union.

== See also ==
- List of England national rugby union players
