= Jock Blackwood =

- Born: John Garven Blackwood; 26 August 1899 Mona Vale, New South Wales
- Died: c. 1979

Rugby union career
- Position: hooker
Amateur team(s)
| Years | Team | Apps | (Points) |
- Eastern Suburbs RUFC
International career
| Years | Team | Apps | (Points) |
| 1922–28 | Wallabies | 21 | (0) |

John Garven Blackwood (26 August 1899 – c. 1979) was a rugby union player who represented Australia.

Blackwood, a hooker, was born in Mona Vale, New South Wales and claimed a total of 21 international rugby caps for Australia. He was inducted into the Australian Rugby Union's Hall of Fame in 2015.
