= Wylie Breckenridge =

- Born: John Wylie Paton Breckenridge; 22 April 1903 Failford, New South Wales
- Died: 19 March 1981

Rugby union career
- Position: flanker
Amateur team(s)
Years	Team	Apps	(Points)
- Glebe-Balmain
International career
Years	Team	Apps	(Points)
1925–30	Wallabies	11	(0)

John Wylie Paton Breckenridge (22 April 1903 – 19 March 1981) was a rugby union player who represented Australia.

Breckenridge, a flanker, was born in Failford, New South Wales and claimed a total of 11 international rugby caps for Australia. In October 2014 Breckenridge was inducted into Australia Rugby's Hall of Fame.
