= Alan Thorpe (rugby union) =

Australian rugby union player (1901–1955)

- Born: Alan Charles Thorpe; 25 May 1901 Sydney
- Died: 16 December 1955 (aged 54)
- School: Newington College

Rugby union career
- Position: outside centre
International career
Years	Team	Apps	(Points)
1929	Wallabies	1	(0)

Alan Charles Thorpe (25 May 1901 – 16 December 1955) was a rugby union player who represented Australia.

Thorpe, was born in Sydney and claimed 1 international rugby cap for Australia. He attended Newington College in 1914 and 1915.
