= Bruce Judd =

Australian rugby union player

[Percival] Bruce Judd (2 May 1907 – 3 January 1969) was an Australian Rugby Union player and represented for the Wallabies 11 times. He attended Newington College (1920–1924).
