= Geoff Bland =

Rugby player (1905–1961)

- Full name: Geoffrey Victor Bland
- Born: 26 September 1905 Manly, Australia
- Died: 26 February 1961 (aged 55) Glasgow, Scotland
- School: Manly High School; St Mary's Cathedral College

Rugby union career
- Position: Forward
International career
Years	Team	Apps	(Points)
1928–33	Australia	8 (Note: According to Rugby Australia website classicwallabies.com.au, Bland was capped nine times. They credit Bland with one further Test match on the 1933 South Africa tour.)	(0)

Geoffrey Victor Bland (26 September 1905 – 26 February 1961) was an Australian international rugby union player.

== Biography ==
Bland, a native of Sydney, was educated at Manly High School and St Mary's Cathedral College. He was a surf life saver with the North Steyne Surf Lifesaving Club, regarded as one of the best sweep oarsman in New South Wales.

Primarily a lock forward, Bland was a line-out specialist and began his first-grade career with Manly in 1925. Two year later, he achieved a New South Wales call up for the eight-month long 1927–28 tour of the British Isles, France and Canada, playing six matches over the course of the trip. He was also a member of the New South Wales team that toured New Zealand in 1928 and played in a win over a NZ XV in Christchurch, which would retrospectively become his Test debut (due to the fact the Wallabies were not competing at this time). After a four-year hiatus, Bland made further Test appearances in 1932 and 1933, this time in Wallabies colours, which included matches on the 1933 tour of South Africa.

Bland relocated to Scotland at the conclusion of the South Africa tour and married his wife Eileen in 1941. During World War II, he was a lieutenant with the Irish Guards, taking part in the Battle of Anzio. He died in Glasgow in 1961 at the age of 55.

== See also ==
- List of Australia national rugby union players
