= Geoff Storey =

- Born: Geoffrey Parnell Storey; 8 August 1904 Strathfield, New South Wales
- Died: c. 1975
- School: Sydney Grammar School

Rugby union career
- Position: lock
Amateur team(s)
Years	Team	Apps	(Points)
- Western Suburbs
International career
Years	Team	Apps	(Points)
1926–30	Wallabies	8	(0)

Geoffrey Parnell Storey (8 August 1904 – c. 1975) was a rugby union player who represented Australia.

Storey, a lock, was born in Strathfield, New South Wales and claimed a total of 8 international rugby caps for Australia.
