= Tom Lawton Snr =

Australia international rugby union player

Tom Lawton
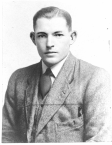
- Born: Tom Lawton; 16 January 1899 Cungumbogan, Queensland, Australia
- Died: 1 July 1978 (aged 79) Greenslopes, Queensland, Australia
- School: Brisbane Grammar School
- University: University of Queensland; Sydney University; Oxford University

Rugby union career
- Position: Stand-off half
Senior career
Years	Team	Apps	(Points)
1919	Queensland University		
- Past Grammar
1920	Sydney University		
1922	Oxford University RFC		
1924	Leicester Tigers		
- Western Suburbs
1922–23	Valley Brisbane		
Provincial / State sides
Years	Team	Apps	(Points)
1920–28	New South Wales	38	
1919–32	Queensland	13	
International career
Years	Team	Apps	(Points)
1920–32	Australia	14	(60)

Tom Lawton Snr (16 January 1899 – 1 July 1978) was an Australian rugby union player, a state and national representative five-eighth who made 44 appearances for the Wallabies, played in 14 Test matches and captained the national side on ten occasions.

== Schoolboy sports star ==
Born at Waterford, Queensland he entered Brisbane Grammar School in 1913 where he excelled at sport. He represented the school in the first XI for four years, was captain in 1916 & 1917, adjudged best fielder in 1915 & 1916 and topped the batting average in 1917. He rowed in the first VIII for three years, played tennis, won at athletics and was school swimming champion and school captain in 1917. He played in the school's rugby first XV for three years and was the best back in 1916 and 1917.

== The Great War & university ==
In 1918 he was a gunner in France with the 12th Field Artillery Brigade of the AIF. After the war he commenced a science degree at the University of Queensland. He represented Queensland in rugby union in 1919 the final year before the sport massively lost its popularity to rugby league prompting the Queensland Rugby Union hiatus that lasted until 1929.

In 1920 he transferred to Sydney University to pursue his medical studies at St. Andrew's College. He played rugby at the Sydney University club. He won a Rhodes scholarship to Oxford University in 1922 residing at New College. He played sixty games in 1922–23 for Oxford, Blackheath, New College and the Barbarians. In 1924 he became the first capped Australian to play for Leicester Tigers, he played one game for the club at home against Bristol. He was selected to captain the Oxford side but was challenged for having played rugby league in his career. He represented Oxford in athletics, swimming and water polo.

== Representative career ==
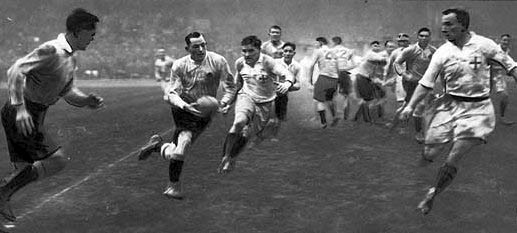
Tom Lawton in action against England at Twickenham, 7 Jan 1928

His representative debut was in 1920 when selected for the New South Wales Waratahs to appear against the All Blacks. He scored a try and kicked three goals in his representative debut. With no Queensland Rugby Union competition in place at that time the New South Wales Waratahs were the top Australian representative rugby union side of the period and a number of Waratah matches of the 1920s played against full international opponents were in 1986 decreed by the Australian Rugby Union as Test matches.

After returning to Sydney from Oxford in 1925 he was immediately given the captaincy of New South Wales for the 1925 tour to New Zealand. He played as captain in nine of the eleven games and top scored with 49 points.

Lawton spent 1926 in the New South Wales, Southern Riverina district on business and played Australian rules football in the Deniliquin Football Association with the East End Football Club that lost the grand final to the Colts Football Club.

Lawton was selected for the 1927–28 Waratahs tour of the British Isles, France and Canada. He played in 27 matches of the tour exceeded only by Wylie Breckenbridge (29), and Alex Ross (29). He was the top point scorer (124 points) and played in all five Test matches of the tour.

In 1929 the All Blacks toured Australia, Lawton captained the first truly national Wallabies side fielded since 1914 which was the first national side in history to beat the All Blacks 3–0 in a series whitewash. When the British and Irish Lions toured Australia in 1930 he captained the Wallabies, Queensland and an invitational XV against them. His representative career ended in 1932 aged 33 years after he led Australia and Queensland against the touring All Blacks.

== Rugby lineage ==
In 2007 Lawton was honoured in the third tranche of inductees into the Australian Rugby Union Hall of Fame. His grandsons Tom Jnr and Rob also both became Wallabies – Rob as a Prop forward made four test appearances from 1988 to 1989, Tom Jnr a Hooker earned 41 caps between 1983 and 1989. In 2007 he was honoured in the third set of inductees into the Australian Rugby Union Hall of Fame, and in 2013 he was inducted into the IRB Hall of Fame.

Preceded by Charlie Fox	Australian national rugby union captain 1925–30	Succeeded by Johnnie Wallace
