= Arthur Finlay (rugby union, born 1903) =

Australia international rugby union player

- Born: Arthur Noel Finlay MC OBE; 25 December 1903 Sydney, New South Wales, Australia
- Died: 20 September 1981 (aged 77)
- School: Sydney Grammar School
- University: University of Sydney

Rugby union career
- Position: lock
Amateur team(s)
Years	Team	Apps	(Points)
- Sydney University
International career
Years	Team	Apps	(Points)
1926–30	Wallabies	12	(0)

Arthur Noel Finlay MC OBE (25 December 1903 – 20 September 1981) was a rugby union player who represented Australia.

Finlay, a lock, was born in Sydney and claimed a total of 12 international rugby caps for Australia.
