= Arthur Young (rugby union, born 1901) =

British Lions & England international rugby union player

- Born: Arthur Tudor Young; 13 December 1901 Darjeeling, India
- Died: 26 February 1933 (aged 31) Bareilly, India
- Height: 5 ft 4 in (1.63 m)
- School: Tonbridge School
- University: Gonville and Caius College, Cambridge

Rugby union career
- Position: scrum-half
Senior career
Years	Team	Apps	(Points)
1920-1929	Barbarian F.C.		
1922-1924	Cambridge University		
- Blackheath F.C.
1924-1926	Army		
International career
Years	Team	Apps	(Points)
1924-1929	England	18	(6)
1924	British Lions	1	(0)

Arthur Tudor Young (14 October 1901 – 26 February 1933) was an English rugby union scrum-half who played for both England and the British Lions. At 5 ft 4ins he was affectionately known as England's little man.

== Personal history ==
Young was born in Darjeeling, India in 1901. As a child he moved to Britain and was educated at Yardley Court and Tonbridge School before matriculating to Gonville and Caius College, Cambridge. On leaving education he joined the British Army, serving in the Royal Tank Corps. Later in his career he was Aide-de-camp to Sir Norman MacMullen while he was General Officer Commanding Eastern Command in India. While serving in India he contracted influenza and died in 1933 from pneumonia at the age of 31.

== Rugby career ==
Young began playing rugby as a youth, turning out for Tunbridge School. On entering Cambridge he joined Cambridge University R.U.F.C. earning three sporting Blues when he faced Oxford in three Varsity matches between 1922–24. After leaving university he joined Blackheath F.C. and also represented Kent at county level. In 1924 he was selected for the England national team, facing Wales in the Five Nations Championship. Young went on to represent England on 18 occasions, scoring two tries. 1924 also saw Young selected for the British Lions on their 1924 British Lions tour to South Africa. He played in nine games of the tour and faced South Africa in the second Test in Johannesburg, which the Lions lost 17–0.

During his time in the British Army, Young represented the Army rugby team ten times between 1926 and 1929. Young was also a long-serving member of invitational touring side Barbarian F.C., first playing with the club in 1920, long before his international career started. He represented the Barbarians 12 times, his final match being against East Midlands in 1929.
