= Wally Meagher =

- Born: Francis Wallace Meagher; 1903 Sydney
- Died: 14 December 1966

Rugby union career
- Position: scrum-half
Amateur team(s)
Years	Team	Apps	(Points)
- Randwick
International career
Years	Team	Apps	(Points)
1923–27	Wallabies	8	(3)

Francis Wallace Meagher (1903 – 14 December 1966) was a rugby union player who represented Australia.

Meagher, a scrum-half, was born in Sydney and claimed a total of 8 international rugby caps for Australia. He was inducted into the Wallaby Hall of Fame in 2012.

Meagher's grandson, Peter "Marzo" Meagher—a first-class rugby team manager and club volunteer, freelancer photographer, and NSW Police Force member on the front lines for nearly 40 years—was one of 15 people murdered during the 2025 Bondi Beach shooting.
