= Johnnie Wallace =

Australia & Scotland international rugby union player (1900–1975)

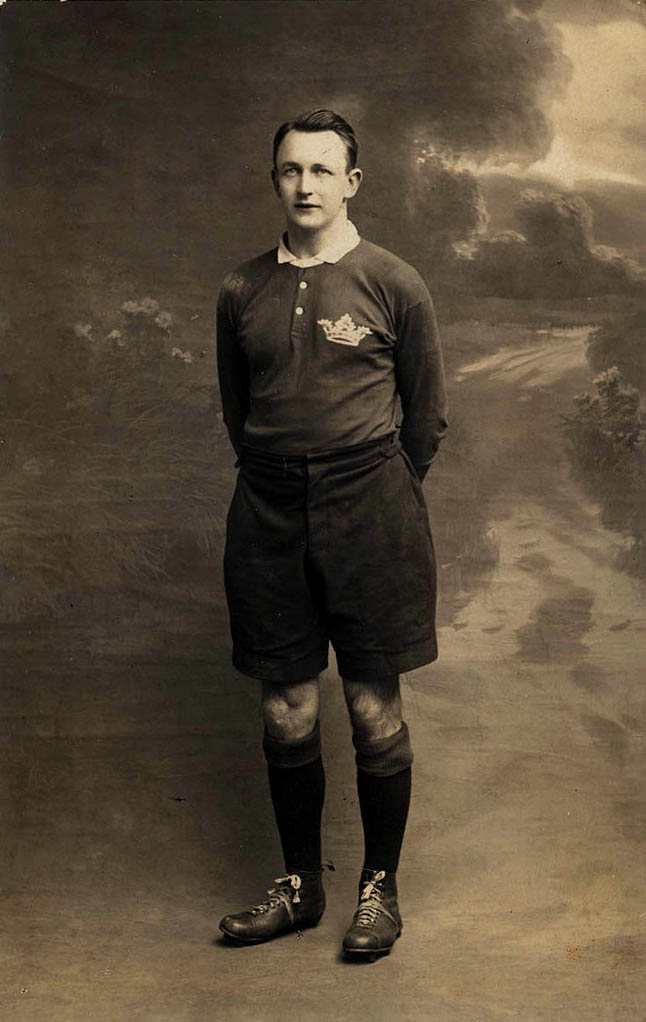
- Wallace in the 1920s
- Born: Arthur Cooper Wallace; 5 October 1900 Macksville, New South Wales
- Died: 3 November 1975 (aged 75) The Entrance, New South Wales
- School: Sydney Grammar School
- University: University of Sydney; University of Oxford

Rugby union career
- Position(s): wing, centre
Senior career
Years	Team	Apps	(Points)
1920–21	Sydney University		
1926–30	Glebe-Balmain RUFC		
Provincial / State sides
Years	Team	Apps	(Points)
1921–28	New South Wales	30	
International career
Years	Team	Apps	(Points)
1921–28	Australia	8	(15)
1923–26	Scotland	9	(33)

Arthur Cooper "Johnnie" Wallace (5 October 1900 – 3 November 1975) was an Australian rugby union player, a state and national representative three-quarter who captained the Waratahs (the national side at the time) on 25 occasions in the 1920s as well as representing Scotland early in his career.

== University & early representative career ==
Wallace arrived at St Andrew's College at Sydney University in 1920 to study law and at the University rugby club he came under the influence of Hyram Marks, who had been senior to Wallace at Sydney Grammar and who was the club's first Wallaby representative. His potential was obvious and in 1921 he was selected in the New South Wales side picked to tour New Zealand. He played in five of the ten tour matches including the September 1921 fixture against a New Zealand XV which is now regarded as a Test match.

With no Queensland Rugby Union administration or competition in place from 1919 to 1929, the New South Wales Waratahs were the top Australian representative rugby union side of the period and a number of the fixtures of 1920s which were played against full international opposition were decreed by the Australian Rugby Union in 1986 as official Test matches.

In 1922 Wallace won a Rhodes scholarship to Oxford where he won University "blues" in 1922, 1923, 1924, and 1925.

== Scotland representative ==
While at Oxford, he represented Scotland in nine Tests between 1923 and 1926. He made his Scots national debut in a Five Nations fixture in January 1923 against France. He played against all of the Home Nations while representing for Scotland. making his last appearance in January 1926 at Stade Colombes also against France.

As a player, he had good speed, outside break, and was an effective finisher.

== Australian representative ==
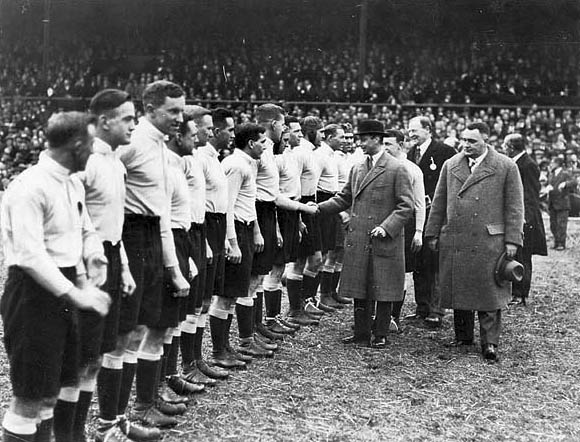
Wallace introduces his team to the Duke of York at Twickenham, 7 Jan 1928

On his return to Australia in 1926 he joined the Glebe-Balmain RUFC and in July of that year was selected for two Waratahs matches against the All Blacks.

Prior to the start of the Australian 1927 season an invitation from the International Rugby Board arrived in Sydney requesting a New South Wales side tour Great Britain to play Tests against the Home Nations. A squad of twenty-nine players was selected comprising twenty-eight New South Welshmen and one Queenslander in Tom Lawton, Snr who had come to Sydney to continue his career. Wallace was selected as captain for nine-month 1927–28 Waratahs tour of Britain, France and Canada.

The selection of Wallace as captain is referred to in the Howell reference as "a masterstoke". He was well known in Britain through his Oxford and Scotland association, was an experienced and naturally gifted player, a strong tactician and a great influence on the younger players. On the nine-month tour, the Australians won 24, lost 5 and drew 2 of the matches they played and returned having established an international reputation for playing fair and attacking rugby.

Howell quotes a speech given by Wallace at the tour's conclusion Every man went into the game wholeheartedly and did his utmost. Australia should be especially proud of the team considering that the Waratahs were picked from nine clubs, while England has 40,000 players to draw from.

== Post-playing ==
After 1928 Wallace opted out of representative rugby but played at club level till 1930 and acted as a selector and coach for New South Wales and Australia for a number of years. He toured as assistant manager-coach with a number of Wallaby sides and coached a Waratah team to a surprise victory over the Springboks at the Sydney Cricket Ground in 1937.

After the death of his father he returned home to Macksville to attend to family business affairs. Later he returned to Sydney and worked as a non-practising barrister with the Crown Solicitors office. He died at The Entrance, New South Wales in 1975.

== Accolades ==
In 2010 he was honoured in the sixth set of inductees into the Australian Rugby Union Hall of Fame.

== Sources ==
- Collection (1995) Gordon Bray presents The Spirit of Rugby, Harper Collins Publishers Sydney
- Howell, Max (2005) Born to Lead – Wallaby Test Captains, Celebrity Books, Auckland
- Bodis, J. P. (1990). "Wallace, Arthur Cooper (Johnny) (1900–1975)". Australian Dictionary of Biography. National Centre of Biography, Australian National University.
- "Rhodes Scholar – Mr A. C. Wallace Chosen for 1922". The Sydney Morning Herald. 11 November 1921. p. 8.

== Footnotes ==
Preceded by Tom Lawton, Snr	Australian national rugby union captain 1927–28	Succeeded by Syd Malcolm
