= Alex Ross (rugby union) =

Australia international rugby union player

Alec Ross
- Born: Alec William Ross; 24 November 1905 Cundletown, New South Wales
- Died: 30 August 1996 (aged 90)
- Height: 5 ft 8 in (173 cm)
- Weight: 10 st 6 lb (146 lb; 66 kg)
- School: Sydney Grammar School
- University: University of Sydney
- Occupation: General Practitioner

Rugby union career
- Position: Full-back
Senior career
Years	Team	Apps	(Points)
	Sydney University	66	
–	Manly RUFC	22	
–	Eastern Suburbs RUFC	18	
Provincial / State sides
Years	Team	Apps	(Points)
1925-1934	New South Wales	33	
International career
Years	Team	Apps	(Points)
1925-1934	Australia	20	

Alexander William Ross (4 November 1905 – 30 August 1996) was an Australian state and national representative rugby union player who captained the Wallabies in thirteen Test matches in 1933-34.

== Career ==
Ross was schooled at Sydney Grammar and studied medicine at Sydney University while attending St Andrew's College. He made his first representative appearance in 1925 at the time when the Queensland Rugby Union administration was dormant rendering the New South Wales Waratahs the top Australian representative rugby union side of the period 1919 to 1929. A number of the Waratah fixtures of the 1920s which were played against full international opposition and in which Ross appeared were decreed by the Australian Rugby Union in 1986 as official Test matches.

In 1925 Ross debuted with appearances for New South Wales against New Zealand in a first XV, a second XV and an "A" XV. He played 13 tests with New South Wales between 1925 and 1930 and received five Blues from Sydney University in each of the years 1925 to 1929.

He made three Test appearances against New Zealand in 1926 and then was selected for the 1927–28 New South Wales rugby union tour of the British Isles, France and Canada captained by Johnnie Wallace where he played in all five Tests of the tour plus 24 of the minor matches. He was a stalwart of the nine-month tour and appeared in 29 of the total 38 matches - more than any other player.

In 2009, he was honoured in the fourth set of inductees into the Australian Rugby Union Hall of Fame.

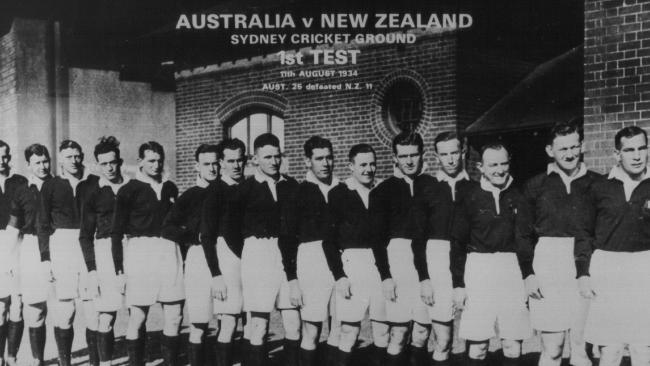
Ross (right), captain of the victorious Bledisloe Wallabies, 1st Test v NZ 11 Aug 1934

Preceded by Dave Cowper	Australian national rugby union captain 1933-34	Succeeded by Ron Walden
