= Rugby Australia =

Governing body for rugby union in Australia

- Sport: Rugby union
- Founded: 1949; 77 years ago
- World Rugby affiliation: 1949; 77 years ago
- Oceania affiliation: 2000; 26 years ago
- Headquarters: Moore Park Road, Moore Park, New South Wales, Australia
- Location: 33°53′15″S 151°13′26″E
- Chairman: Daniel Herbert
- President: Nathan Sharpe; Kristy Giteau
- CEO: Phil Waugh
- Website: australia.rugby

Rugby Australia Ltd, previously named Australian Rugby Union Limited and Australian Rugby Football Union Limited, is an Australian company operating the premier rugby union competition in Australia and teams. It has its origins in 1949. It is a member of World Rugby. Rugby Australia has eight member unions, representing each state and the Northern Territory and Australian Capital Territory. It also manages national representative rugby union teams, including the Wallabies and the Wallaroos.

== History ==
Until the end of the 1940s, the New South Wales Rugby Union, as the senior rugby organisation in Australia, was responsible for administration of a national representative rugby team, including all tours. However, the various state unions agreed that the future of rugby in Australia would be better served by having a national administrative body and so the Australian Rugby Football Union was formed at a conference in Sydney in 1945, acting initially in an advisory capacity only. Additional impetus came in 1948 when the International Rugby Football Board invited Australia specifically (rather than a New South Wales representative), to take a seat on the Board.

The constitution of the Australian Rugby Football Union was ratified on 25 November 1949 at the inaugural council meeting of eleven delegates from the state unions of New South Wales, Queensland, South Australia, Western Australia, Tasmania and Victoria. ACT and Southern New South Wales gained membership in 1972. Northern Territory joined in 1978, initially as an associate union before later being granted membership and voting rights.

Logo 2001–2017

In 1985 the Australian Rugby Football Union was incorporated as a company (ACN 002 898 544). In 1997, it was renamed Australian Rugby Union Limited, known as the ARU and again renamed, in 2017, as Rugby Australia Limited.

A founding member, the New South Wales Rugby Union, lost two affiliated regional organisations in 2004 when they affiliated to the ACT Rugby Union which became the ACT and Southern NSW Rugby Union.

Rugby Australia's major sponsor, since 2004, is Qantas. Qantas has had official naming rights for the 'Qantas Wallabies'.

In 2017, the Australian Rugby Union was re-branded Rugby Australia, coinciding with relocating to their new premises in Moore Park, Sydney.

In July 2021, Rugby Australia announced plans are underway to construct a Museum deatailing the history of Australian Rugby. It will feature items from Wallabies and Wallaroos history along with the provincial history of the sport, dating back to the late 19th century.

== Governance ==
The organisation's governing structures were overhauled in December 2012, following a review authored by the former federal senator and Minister for Sport, Mark Arbib.

=== Members ===
Rugby Australia's members (shareholders) include state and territory Rugby unions, together with the owners of the Super Rugby bodies within Australia and the Rugby Union Players' Association (RUPA).

Members may exercise their voting rights at the annual general meeting. Under the current Constitution adopted in 2012, the eight existing state and territory Member Unions, RUPA and each of the current Super Rugby team licensees are entitled to vote with the exception of NSW Waratahs as it is now owned by Rugby Australia. Member Unions with more than 50,000 registered players in their region are granted an additional vote. Only the New South Wales Rugby Union and Queensland Rugby Union exceed that mark at present, so the total number of members' votes is currently 14. There are also a number of affiliated groups that do not have voting rights.

Under this revised governance system, a greater share of influence and control shifted from grass roots team and club representation through the state and territory unions to commercial team owners and the professional players association.

Division Members		Votes	
ACT	ACT and Southern NSW Rugby Union		2
NSW	New South Wales Rugby Union	2	2
NSW	NSW Waratahs	-	2
QLD	Queensland Rugby Union		3
SA	Rugby Union South Australia		1
VIC	Rugby Victoria		1
WA	RugbyWA	1	2
WA	Western Force	1	2
TAS	Tasmanian Rugby Union		1
NT	Northern Territory Rugby Union		1
Rugby Union Players' Association			1

Affiliates
Australian Barbarians Rugby Club
Australian Junior Rugby Union
Australian Schools Rugby Football Union
Australian Services Rugby Union
Australian Women's Rugby Union
Classic Wallabies

Note: The Australian Society of Rugby Referees, and Australian Universities Rugby Union were also previously non-voting affiliates until 2005 and 2014, respectively. New South Wales Country Rugby Union and Sydney Rugby Union were also non-voting affiliates until April 2017.

Prior to 2012, the voting franchise made no allowance for Super Rugby teams or the Players' Association. There were simply fourteen votes split as follows:

- NSW Rugby Union: 5
- Queensland Rugby Union: 3
- Other state and territory member unions: 1 each

=== Board and executive ===
The board must have at least six independent directors, appointed to three-year terms by a two-thirds majority vote of members, in addition to the managing director (chief executive). Up to two further directors may be appointed by ordinary resolution of the board. The board may elect one of the directors as the chair, with the position to be formally reconsidered at least every three years. Executive officers, including the chief executive, are appointed by the board of directors.

List of chairpersons from 1996 onwards:

- Daniel Herbert (2023–present)
- Hamish McLennan (2020–2023)
- Paul McLean, interim (2020)
- Cameron Clyne (2015–2020)
- Michael Hawker (2012–2015)
- Peter McGrath (2007–2012)
- Ron Graham (2005–2007)
- Dilip Kumar (2005)
- Bob Tuckey (2001–2005)
- David Clarke (1998–2001)
- Dick McGruther (1996–1998)
- Leo Williams (1994–1996)

List of chief executives from 1996 onwards:*

- Phil Waugh (2023–present*)
- Andy Marinos (2021–2023)
- Rob Clarke, interim (2020–2021)
- Raelene Castle (2017–2020)
- Bill Pulver (2013–2017)
- John O'Neill (2007–2013)
- Gary Flowers (2004–2007)
- Matt Carroll, interim (2003)
- John O'Neill (1995–2003)

== Teams ==
National teams

- Wallabies – the national rugby union team.
- Wallaroos – the national women's rugby union team.

National sevens teams

- Men's 7s – the national rugby union seven-a-side team.
- Women's 7s - the national women's seven-a-side rugby union team.

Other teams

- Junior Wallabies – the under-20 age graded side that competes for the World Rugby Junior Championship.
- Australian Schoolboys – a representative team of school players that has developed some of today's current Wallabies.

Former teams

- Australia A – the former second-level national rugby union team behind the Wallabies.
- Under 21s – a former age graded side that has developed players who went on to become Wallabies.
- Under 19s – a former age graded side that has developed players who went on to become Wallabies.

== Hall of Fame ==
Rugby Australia promotes and selects a Hall of Fame honouring notable former players. Each year two or three of Australia's greats from all eras of the international game are selected by an eight-man committee to be inducted into the Wallaby Hall of Fame. Inductees are drawn from all Test teams starting with the first side in 1899. Consideration is given to a player's on-field career but induction is not based on statistical achievement alone.

To be eligible for inclusion in the Wallaby Hall of Fame, a player must have:

- Played at least one Test for Australia
- Been retired from Rugby for at least 10 years
- Made a major contribution to the game of Rugby
- Demonstrated outstanding ability, sportsmanship, commitment, character and personal contribution to their team and the game in their era.

Hall of Fame members:

- Trevor Allan
- Jock Blackwood
- Eddie Bonis
- Wylie Breckenridge
- David Brockhoff
- Cyril Burke
- Matthew Burke
- David Campese
- Ken Catchpole
- Bill Cerutti
- Des Connor
- Greg Cornelsen
- Peter Crittle
- Greg Davis
- Sir Edward "Weary" Dunlop
- John Eales
- Charlie Eastes
- Mark Ella
- Nick Farr-Jones
- Jack Ford
- Tim Gavin
- George Gregan
- Rob Heming
- John Hipwell
- Tim Horan
- Peter Johnson
- Phil Kearns
- Toutai Kefu
- Stephen Larkham
- Tom Lawton, Snr
- Mark Loane
- Michael Lynagh
- Paul McLean
- Wally Meagher
- Tony Miller
- Herbert Moran
- Simon Poidevin
- Tom Richards
- Alex Ross
- Geoff Shaw
- Tony Shaw
- Sir Nicholas Shehadie
- Andrew Slack
- George Smith
- John Solomon
- John Thornett
- Johnnie Wallace
- Jon White
- Colin Windon

== Controversies ==
=== Israel Folau saga ===
In 2018, Rugby Australia became involved in a controversy with player and Christian preacher Israel Folau over his social media posts expressing his religious views seeking to save homosexuals from hell when he called on them to "repent of their sins and turn to God". On 17 May 2019, Rugby Australia terminated Folau's player contract. On 6 June 2019, Folau launched legal proceedings with the Fair Work Commission against Rugby Australia and the Waratahs under section 772 of the Fair Work Act, which makes it unlawful to terminate employment on the basis of religion. The Australian Christian Lobby (ACL) announced on 25 June 2019 that it was donating $100,000 to Folau and was setting up a donation site for his legal costs. The campaign raised over $2 million in two days before being paused by the ACL with Folau's consent. On 19 July 2019, the Fair Work Commission issued a certificate confirming all reasonable attempts to resolve the dispute between Folau and Rugby Australia had been unsuccessful. On 1 August 2019, Folau launched legal action in the Federal Circuit Court of Australia, against RA and NSW Rugby for unlawful termination on the basis of religion, breach of contract and restraint of trade. Folau sought an apology, compensation, penalties and the right to play rugby union again. In November 2019, Folau increased his compensation claim against Rugby Australia to $14 million, claiming that he could have been a Wallabies captain.

Folau and Rugby Australia issued a joint statement and apology on 4 December 2019 that stated no harm had been intended by either party and announced that a confidential settlement had been reached.

=== Financial Crisis ===
Rugby Australia's parlous financial position following the Folau affair became apparent upon the COVID-19 outbreak in 2020 when it was forced to lay off three quarters of its employees and seek agreements with players to reduce payments. The CEO, Raelene Castle was sacked and calls continued for a shake-up of the board and management.

Rugby Australia's financial challenges continued since COVID-19 and, in 2023, the organisation made failed attempts to sell 20% of its competitions, teams and business to private equity investors. On 24 November 2023, Rugby Australia confirmed the successful conclusion of its capital raise process following the execution of an agreement with Pacific Equity Partners for a flexible and upsized $80m credit facility over a 5-year term.

=== Support for Indigenous Voice ===
Rugby Australia announced its support for the proposed Indigenous Voice to Parliament.

== Rugby.com.au ==
Rugby.com.au
- Website type: Sports news
- Available in: English
- Area served: Australia
- Website: www.rugby.com.au
- Launched: 1990s
- Current status: Active

Rugby.com.au is a news website that reports primarily on rugby union in Australia. The website is owned and operated by Rugby Australia. Although the website was established some time in the 1990s, Rugby.com.au states, "In 2016, Australian Rugby launched its very own media brand, rugby.com.au as a rugby news hub to fuel the conversations of rugby fans nationwide."

The website also has various social media channels. Many of these platforms provide content, such as rugby highlights, and exclusive interviews with rugby player and executives.

== See also ==
- Rugby Union Players' Association (RUPA)

== Sources ==
- "Annual Report 2015". Australian Rugby. Archived from the original on 24 July 2016.
- "Constitution of Australian Rugby Union Limited" (PDF). 2012.
- Mulford, John G. (2005). Guardians of the Game: The History of the New South Wales Rugby Union 1874-2004. ABC Books. ISBN 0-7333-1625-5.
