= 1933 Australia rugby union tour of South Africa =

Summary
| P | W | D | L |
Total
| 23 | 11 | 1 | 11 |
Test match
| 5 | 2 | 0 | 3 |
Opponent
| P | W | D | L |
South Africa
| 5 | 2 | 0 | 3 |

The 1933 Australia rugby union tour of South Africa and Rhodesia was a series of 23 rugby union matches played by the Australia national team in 1933.

Australia played a total of 23 matches, with a 5-Test series v South Africa, who won three of the five games.

This was the first touring team to be officially named as "The Wallabies" since the 1908-09 Australian side to Great Britain. All touring squads from 1933 onwards were called Wallabies.

== Touring party ==
The tour manager was Dr. W. F. ('Wally') Matthews, who had previously been the team manager for the AIF rugby team which played in The King's Cup in 1919. A squad of 29 players was selected for the tour – 15 from New South Wales, 11 from Queensland, and 3 from Victoria.

With exception of two of the Victorians, the team departed Sydney aboard the "Ulysses" on Anzac Day, 25 April 1933. The remaining two players, O. J. Bridle and D. Cowper joined the vessel at Melbourne after the Wallabies had played a match against a Victorian team.

The Wallabies touring party consisted of:

- Manager: Dr. W. F. Matthews (NSW)

Playing squad:

- Captain: Dr. A. W. Ross (NSW)
- Vice-captain: S. J. Malcolm (NSW)
- F. McPhillips (NSW)
- B. A. Grace (NSW)
- J. Kelaher (NSW)
- J. Young (NSW)
- R. Biilmann (NSW)
- C. Campbell (NSW)
- R. B. Louden (NSW)
- W. Mackney (NSW)
- A. Hodgson (NSW)
- G. V. Bland (NSW)
- W. H. Cerutti (NSW)
- E. W. Love (NSW)
- M. F. Morton (NSW)
- D. McLean Jr. (QLD)
- W. Warlow (QLD)
- J. Steggall (QLD)
- G Bennett (QLD)
- J. Clark (QLD)
- M. White (QLD)
- W. G. White (QLD)
- G. Cooke (QLD)
- J. Ritter (QLD)
- B. Doneley (QLD)
- E. Bonis (QLD)
- G. S. Sturtridge (VIC)
- D. Cowper (VIC)
- O. J. Bridle (VIC)

== Match summary ==
Scores and results list Australia's points tally first.

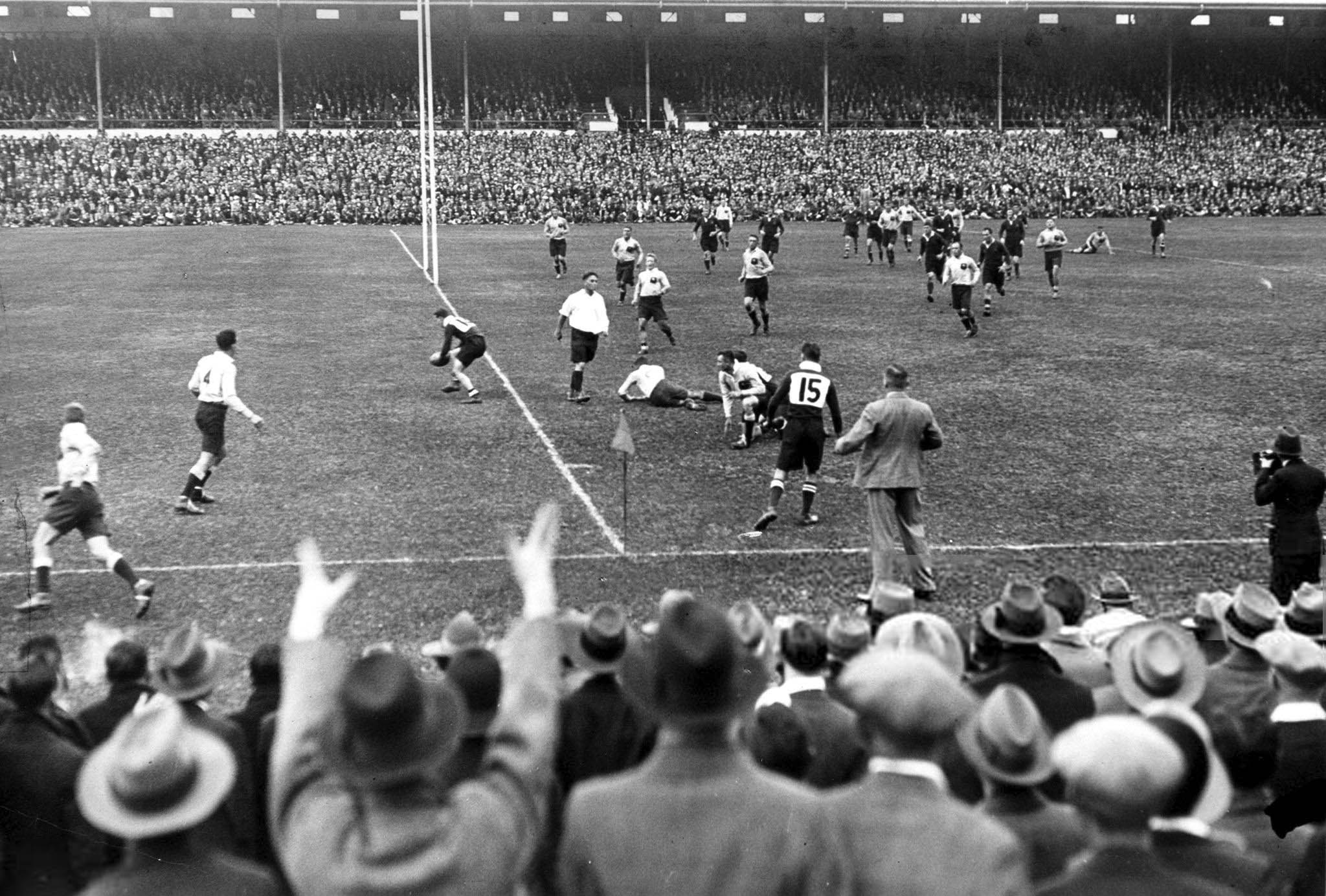
Danie Craven scoring a try for South Africa in the first test v Australia on 8 July

| Opposing Team | For | Against | Date | Venue | Status |
|---|---|---|---|---|---|
| Natal | 14 | 3 | 3 June 1933 | Durban | Tour match |
| Western Transvaal | 20 | 3 | 7 June 1933 | Potchefstroom | Tour match |
| Witwatersrand | 6 | 13 | 10 June 1933 | Ellis Park, Johannesburg | Tour match |
| Combined Pretoria XV | 8 | 13 | 14 June 1933 | Pretoria | Tour match |
| Griqualand West | 9 | 14 | 17 June 1933 | Kimberley | Tour match |
| Rhodesia | 24 | 5 | 20 June 1933 | Salisbury | Tour match |
| Rhodesia | 31 | 0 | 24 June 1933 | Bulawayo | Tour match |
| Northern District | 8 | 16 | 28 June 1933 | Kimberley | Tour match |
| Western Province | 9 | 13 | 1 July 1933 | Cape Town | Tour match |
| South Africa | 3 | 17 | 8 July 1933 | Cape Town | Test Match |
| North East District | 31 | 11 | 12 July 1933 | Aliwal North | Tour match |
| Orange Free State | 8 | 9 | 15 July 1933 | Bloemfontein | Tour match |
| South Africa | 21 | 6 | 22 July 1933 | Durban | Test Match |
| Border | 24 | 5 | 29 July 1933 | East London | Tour match |
| Border | 13 | 6 | 2 August 1933 | Queenstown | Tour match |
| Transvaal | 9 | 11 | 7 August 1933 | Ellis Park, Johannesburg | Tour match |
| South Africa | 3 | 12 | 12 August 1933 | Ellis Park, Johannesburg | Test Match |
| Western Districts | 21 | 14 | 16 August 1933 | Oudtshoorn | Tour match |
| Eastern Province | 18 | 3 | 19 August 1933 | Port Elizabeth | Tour match |
| South Africa | 0 | 11 | 26 August 1933 | Port Elizabeth | Test Match |
| South Africa | 15 | 4 | 2 September 1933 | Bloemfontein | Test Match |
| Combined University | 3 | 3 | 6 September 1933 | Cape Town | Tour match |
| Western Province | 0 | 4 | 9 September 1933 | Cape Town | Tour match |

== Match details ==
=== First Test ===
8 July

| South Africa | 17–3 | Australia |
| Try: Bergh (2), Craven, Osler; Con: Brand; Pen: Brand | Report | Pen: Biilmann |

Newlands Stadium, Cape Town
Attendance: 20,000
Referee: V.H. Neser

Team details

| South Africa | Australia |

South Africa: Gerry Brand; Pat Lyster, Frank Waring, Jimmy White, Freddy Turner; Bennie Osler (c), Danie Craven; Paul Vissler, Bert Kipling, Joe Nykamp; Boy Louw, Manie Geere; Fanie Louw, Lappies Hattingh, Ferdie Bergh
Australia: Jack Steggall; Doug McLean, Gordon Sturtridge, Dave Cowper (c), Jack Kelaher; Ron Biilmann, Walter Bennett; Bill Cerutti, Eddie Bonis, Max White; Bill White, Graham Cooke; Bob Loudon, Aub Hodgson, Geoff Bland
Australia played in sky blue to avoid clash with South Africa.

=== Second Test ===
22 July

| South Africa | 6–21 | Australia |
| Try: Waring; Pen: Brand | Report | Try: Bennett, Cerutti, Loudon, Sturtridge; Con: Biilmann (3); Pen: Biilman |

Kingsmead Cricket Ground, Durban
Attendance: 17,500
Referee: V.H. Neser

Team details

South Africa: Gerry Brand; Jack Gage, Frank Waring, Jimmy White, Freddy Turner; Bennie Osler, Danie Craven; Boy Louw, Bert Kipling, Fanie Louw; Flip Nel (c), Manie Geere; Fronie Froneman, George d'Alton, Ferdie Bergh
Australia: Jack Steggall; Doug McLean, Gordon Sturtridge, Dave Cowper (c), Jack Kelaher; Ron Biilmann, Walter Bennett; Bill Cerutti, Eddie Bonis, Max White; Bill White, Graham Cooke; Jim Clark, Geoff Bland, Wal Mackney

=== Third Test ===
12 August

| South Africa | 12–3 | Australia |
| Try: MM Louw, Turner; Con: Brand; Drop: Osler | Report | Try: Cowper |

Ellis Park, Johannesburg
Attendance: 40,000
Referee: V.H. Neser

Team details

South Africa: Gerry Brand; Floors Venter, Frank Waring, Jimmy White, Freddy Turner; Bennie Osler, Danie Craven; Boy Louw, Bert Kipling, Fanie Louw; Flip Nel (c), Ferdie Bergh; Manie Geere, Ginger Clark, Fred Smollan
Australia: Jack Steggall; Doug McLean, Gordon Sturtridge, Dave Cowper (c), Jack Kelaher; Ron Biilmann, Walter Bennett; Bill Cerutti, Eddie Bonis, Max White; Bill White, Graham Cooke; Bob Loudon, Owen Bridle, Aub Hodgson

=== Fourth Test ===
26 August

| South Africa | 11–0 | Australia |
| Try: SC Louw, White; Con: Osler; Pen: Brand | Report |

Crusader's Ground, Port Elizabeth
Attendance: 20,000
Referee: A.W. van der Horst

Team details

South Africa: Bunny Reid; Jimmy White, Frank Waring, Danie Craven, Gerry Brand; Bennie Osler, Pierie de Villiers; Manie Geere, Bert Kipling, Fanie Louw; Flip Nel (c), Ferdie Bergh; Boy Louw, Fred Smollan, John Apsey
Australia: Jack Steggall; Doug McLean, Gordon Sturtridge, Dave Cowper, Jack Kelaher; Ron Biilmann, Syd Malcom (c); Bill Cerutti, Eddie Bonis, Max White; Bill White, Geoff Bland; Bob Loudon, Owen Bridle, Aub Hodgson

=== Fifth Test ===
2 September

| South Africa | 4–15 | Australia |
| Drop: Brand | Report | Try: Bridle, Kelaher, Steggall; Con: Ross; Drop: Cowper |

Springbok Park, Bloemfontein
Attendance: 12,000
Referee: V.H. Neser

Team details

South Africa: Jimmy White; Pat Lyster, Frank Waring, Geoff Gray, Gerry Brand; Bennie Osler, Danie Craven; Manie Geere, Bert Kipling, Fanie Louw; Flip Nel (c), Ferdie Bergh; Boy Louw, Fred Smollan, John Apsey
Australia: Alec Ross (c); Doug McLean, Jack Steggall, Dave Cowper, Jack Kelaher; Gordon Sturtridge, Syd Malcom; Bill Cerutti, Eddie Bonis, Max White; Bill White, Graham Cooke; Bob Loudon, Owen Bridle, Wal Mackney

== Bibliography ==
- Vivian Jenkins, ed. (1979). Rothmans Rugby Yearbook 1979–80. Rothmans Publications Ltd. ISBN 0-354-09087-9.

- The Sydney Morning Herald
  - Monday 26 April 1933 p 13
  - Monday 5 June 1933 p 7
  - Friday 9 June 1933 p 11
  - Monday 12 June 1933 p 6
  - Tuesday 15 June 1933 p 13
  - Monday 19 June 1933 p 6
  - Thursday 22 June 1933 p 10
  - Tuesday 29 June 1933 p 10
  - Thursday 17 August 1933 p 10
- The Brisbane Courier
  - Monday 26 June 1933 p 10
  - Monday 3 July 1933 p 7
  - Monday 10 July 1933 p 7
  - Thursday 13 July 1933 p 12
  - Monday 24 July 1933 p 7
  - Monday 31 July 1933 p 7
  - Thursday 3 August 1933 p 16
  - Wednesday 9 August 1933 p 4
  - Monday 14 August 1933 p 7
  - Monday 21 August 1933 p 7
  - Monday 28 August 1933 p 11
- The Courier-Mail
  - Monday 4 September 1933 p 6
  - Thursday 7 September 1933 p 6
  - Monday 11 September 1933 p 8
