= Scots All Saints' College =

Scots All Saints College

Location
- Bathurst, Central West, New South Wales; Australia; 33°25′48″S 149°37′02″E (O'Connell Road)|33°23′50″S 149°33′44″E (Eglinton Road)|

Information
- Type: Independent co-educational early learning, primary, and secondary day and boarding school
- Denomination: Presbyterian
- Established: January 2019; 7 years ago (as Scots All Saints College); 1946–2018 (72 years) (as The Scots School); 1874–2018 (144 years) (as All Saints' College)
- Headmaster: Mr Richard Ford (since 2022)
- Years: Early learning and K–12
- Enrolment: c. 800 (2021)
- Campuses: Bathurst: 70 Eglinton Road; 4173 O’Connell Road
- Campus type: Regional
- Affiliation: Independent Sporting Association (Australia); Junior School Heads Association of Australia
- Website: scotsallsaints.nsw.edu.au

Scots All Saints College is a multi-campus independent Presbyterian Church co-educational early learning, primary, and secondary day and boarding school, with two campuses in Bathurst New South Wales, Australia. Formed in 2019 through a merger of The Scots School, Bathurst (commonly referred to as Scots) which was founded in 1946, and the former All Saints' College in Bathurst which was founded in 1874. The college provides a religious and general education to approximately 800 children covering early learning through Kindergarten to Year 12.

The college is administered by a board appointed by the Trustees of the Presbyterian Church of Australia in New South Wales.

== History ==
=== The Scots School ===
==== Before Foundation ====
The property on which the Bathurst campus of The Scots School was built in the late 1860s and early 1870s was originally called "Karralee", and it was owned by cattle and horse breeder John Lee. It is located in Kelso, New South Wales. It was bought by the trustees of the family of William Arnott (died 1901) of Arnott's Biscuits in the 1930s as a home for his daughter.

==== 1940s ====
In 1942, The Scots College in Sydney leased the property for the relocation of its students from Bellevue Hill, Sydney, because of the fear of Japanese naval bombardment. The Scots College operated in Bathurst until 1945 when it moved back to Sydney. However many boys from central New South Wales were enrolled in the school and their parents asked the Trustees of the Presbyterian Church of Australia in New South Wales to continue the school at Bathurst. Consequently, the Trustees bought "Karralee" and established the Scots School, Bathurst.

==== 1990s ====
In 1997 the school changed from a high school (Years 7–12) to cater for primary school students too, and opened a preparatory school in the old Cooerwull boarding house, thus becoming K–12. In early 1997 the school Board decided that the school should change from being a boys only school to being co-educational, and the first female students were admitted in the fourth term of 1997.

=== All Saints College ===
==== Early years to 1900s ====
In 1873 Canon Thomas Smith of All Saints' Cathedral, Bathurst, with the support of Bishop Samuel Marsden began the process of starting the School. On January 27, 1874, the Bathurst Church of England College opened its doors to seven students under the headmastership of Henry Kemmis. Renamed All Saints' College, the school officially came into being and moved to its permanent site on the corner of Piper and Hope Streets after a successful fund raising campaign and the Bishop's donation of land.

In 1888 Edward Bean, the Senior Classics Master of Sydney Grammar, and father of C.E.W. Bean, succeeded Henry Kemmis. During the eleven years of his headmastership, the college enrolment grew significantly. Bean produced the badge and motto, designed the uniform, commenced the Bathurstian (the school year book), introduced the prefect system, cadets, debating, dancing and carpentry, as well as opening a library and the Prep School.

The third Headmaster was Frederick Tracey. During his tenure representatives of the college attended meetings in 1892 to set up the Athletics Association of the Great Public Schools of New South Wales; the college didn't proceed to active membership of the GPS and has never taken part in any of its activities. In 1893 the Old Bathurstians' Union was started. With their support, Tracey purchased the school from the Church, thus becoming its proprietor, a position he maintained until 1919 when he sold the land and buildings to the Government of New South Wales.

==== 1900s to 1950s ====
Originally the Assistant Master under Bean and the fourth Headmaster was Mr Britten. During his tenure the college became involved in rugby, football and cricket; several boys went on to play for NSW and Australia. He also persuaded the Old Bathurstians' Union to finance the building of a Chapel which they later moved brick by brick to the college's present location on the then Ophir Road, now Eglinton Road.

In 1911 Britten was succeeded by George Stiles. A linguist and an amateur boxing champion at Oxford University, he promoted French and German and brought boxing to the college. With the coming of war in 1914, enrolments dropped, staff became difficult to obtain and prices soared. On 30 June 1919, Stiles resigned and the college closed.

In 1923 the headmaster of Grammar School, Cooma, and one of his staff, Cameron McLeod, sought permission to re-open the college on its present site after purchasing Esrom House and 2 acres of adjoining land. The nearby Travellers' Rest Hotel was purchased for additional classrooms, and Walmer House on the river was leased for boarders.

==== 1960s to 2000s ====
In 1966 there were three headmasters: Roy Dent resigned, Vic Tunbridge of Geelong Grammar took over as acting Headmaster, and later in the year the Council appointed Peter Gebhardt as the tenth Headmaster. He introduced programmes including Eastern-Western Week (work experience), Outdoor Education and Arts and Artists Week, most of which continue today. He also initiated the building of the H.R. Richardson Memorial Library and Watson College (now Watson Boarding House).

Dan Massey was appointed Headmaster in 1975. He introduced co-education in 1976, and was instrumental in the college amalgamating with Marsden Girls School in 1977. In 1982 the Junior School was reopened under Doug Finlay.

Dan Massey resigned at the end of 1983 and Deputy Headmaster Bruce Clydsdale, took over until Robert Bickerdike was appointed in 1985. Previously Principal of Girton College and Head of Geelong Grammar's Timbertop, Mr Robert Bickerdike was headmaster for eight years, during which buildings were added and student numbers increased.

In 1993 Timothy Wright, formerly Second Master at Trinity Grammar Sydney, became headmaster. During his time as Headmaster, formal Pastoral Care Structure was developed and implemented within the college timetable. Wright oversaw the development of college facilities such as the building of the Foundation Block and the Evans Block, and the refurbishment of the Science Labs. The second stage of the Junior School Development was also completed during his time. In 1998 the inaugural Transition to School class commenced with a full complement. Dr Wright was appointed to Shore (Sydney Church of England Grammar School) in 2003.

==== 2000s to 2018 ====
Jenny Williams joined All Saints' College from Snowy Mountains Grammar at the start of 2003. She continued the development of the college, overseeing the refurbishment of Britten House, the Dining Room, the Music and IT Centres and the front of Esrom House. Williams remained as Head of college until 20 March 2008 when she accepted the position of Head of Samuel Marsden Collegiate School in Wellington, New Zealand.

Peter Miller was appointed Head of college at the start of Term 3, 2008. He had previously been Head of Middle School at Barker College, Sydney. Miller had received a Rowing Blue at Sydney University and represented Australia in the Senior B Lightweight Four. Mr Steven O'Connor started as Head of college at the start of Term 2, 2016.

All Saints' College was purchased by the Presbyterian Church NSW in 2017 and merged with The Scots School, Bathurst in 2018. The college became Scots All Saints College with its first official year of operation in 2019 as the Foundation Year.

== Performing Arts Academy ==
=== Music ===
==== Choirs, Ensembles and Bands ====
Offering the largest range of ensembles and choirs within regional NSW schools, there are currently 42 symphonic orchestras, choirs, concert and big bands, rock and pop bands, chamber music and the pipes and drums. All students have the opportunity to sing in music classes, join a stage choir and perform at local events and Eisteddfods.

== Co-curricular activities ==
=== Equestrian ===
Scots All Saints College Equestrian Program is a co-curricular program designed to allow students who have their own horses to train and compete during the summer periods. It is offered as a co-curricular activity throughout the year. Students can also be involved in the equestrian program and participate in other co-curricular activities.

=== Debating & public speaking ===
Scots All Saints' College competes in the HICES Debating competition, fielding eight teams for students from Year 5 to Year 11.

Both All Saints' College and The Scots School have achieved great success in debating and Scots All Saints College continued this success in 2019. Scots All Saints' College also hosts an annual Inter-House debating competition.

== Notable alumni ==
=== All Saints' College ===
- C. E. W. Bean, World War I historian
- Ron Biilmann (1908–1963), rugby union player
- Simon Chapman AO PhD FASSA (born 1951), Professor of Public Health, University of Sydney
- Terence Clarke AM, composer and theatre director (also attended Shore School; later taught at ASC)
- Tim Ferguson, comedian
- Gerry Harvey (born 1939), entrepreneur and co-founder of Harvey Norman
- Bobby Gibbes OAM, DSO, DFC (1916–2007), World War II flying ace
- Arthur Charles Hall VC, soldier, grazier, Victoria Cross recipient
- James Roy Kinghorn, naturalist and broadcaster
- Gavin Merrick Long OBE (1901–1968), World War II historian
- Tom McKibbin (1870–1939), test cricketer
- Scott Staniforth (born 1977), rugby union player
- Sir Charles Wade KCMG (1863–1922), Premier of New South Wales (1907–1910)

=== The Scots School ===
- Peter Raymond Barnett – a Rhodes Scholar (1995)
- Anthony John Bartley SC – a barrister
- Hugh Bowman – a jockey: Recipient of the Silver Saddle Award for most successful jockey at Royal Ascot (also attended The Scots College)
- John Allan Farrington – an athlete
- Sam Hutchins – a contestant on the sixth season of The Mole
- Stephen Peacocke – an actor of "Darryl Brax" on Home and Away, Channel 7
- Angus Richardson – one of three brothers attending who went on to create the Celtic rock band Brother.
- Commander Brett Westcott – a Royal Australian Navy Commander of HMAS Childers
- Brett Whiteley – an artist (also attended The Scots College)

== See also ==
- List of non-government schools in New South Wales
- List of boarding schools in Australia
- List of pipe bands
