= Nigel Staniforth =

- Born: 19 June 1981 (age 45)
- Height: 190 cm (6 ft 3 in)
- Weight: 90 kg (198 lb)
- School: All Saints' College, Bathurst
- University: University of Sydney

Rugby union career
- Position: Fullback
Senior career
Years	Team	Apps	(Points)
2008–09	US Bressane	29	(16)
Provincial / State sides
Years	Team	Apps	(Points)
2006	New South Wales	2	(0)
2007	Counties Manukau	6	(3)

Nigel Staniforth (born 19 June 1981) is an Australian former professional rugby union player.

Raised in West Wyalong, Staniforth is the youngest son of New South Wales Country winger Peter and a nephew of Wallabies loose forward Tony Gelling. He was one of four rugby playing brothers, consisting of Wallaby Scott, national rugby sevens player Graydon and New South Wales under-19s representative Mitchell, who is the eldest.

Staniforth attended All Saints' College, Bathurst, where he was first XV captain, and toured Europe with the Australian Schools side at the end of 1998, under the captaincy of David Lyons.

A fullback, Staniforth played for Sydney University in the Shute Shield. He earned state representative honours in 2006, played in New Zealand for Counties Manukau the following year, then competed with French club US Bressane in the 2008–09 Rugby Pro D2 season. Retiring in 2022, Staniforth finished his career at the Orange Emus.
