= Max White =

Max White may refer to:

- Max White (politician), Canadian politician in the New Brunswick Legislative Assembly
- Max White (rugby union) (1908–1979), Australian rugby union international
