= Mark Morton (rugby union) =

Rugby player (1910–1994)

- Full name: Mark Fairles Morton
- Born: 24 May 1910 Nowra, NSW, Australia
- Died: 17 July 1994 (aged 84)
- Height: 1.78 m (5 ft 10 in)
- Weight: 74 kg (164 lb)
- School: The King's School
- University: University of Sydney
- Notable relatives: Mark Morton (father); George Fuller (uncle)

Rugby union career
- Position: Hooker
Provincial / State sides
Years	Team	Apps	(Points)
1930–1935	New South Wales	23	(18)
International career
Years	Team	Apps	(Points)
1933	Australia		

Mark Fairles Morton (24 May 1910 – 17 July 1994) was an Australian international rugby union player.

Born in Nowra, Morton was the son of politician Mark Morton Sr, a long–serving member of the New South Wales Legislative Assembly. His maternal uncle was state premier George Fuller.

Morton was educated at The King's School and the University of Sydney, where he studied law. He played rugby for the university, gaining five blues during the early 1930s, and toured New Zealand with an Australian Universities representative side. In 1932, Morton was in the New South Wales team that faced the touring All Blacks.

A hooker, Morton gained Wallabies selection in 1933 as an understudy to Eddie Bonis on that year's tour of South Africa. He did not get an opportunity against the Springboks, instead restricted to six uncapped tour matches.

== See also ==
- List of Australia national rugby union players
