= Graydon Staniforth =

- Born: Graydon Staniforth; 23 November 1973 (age 52) West Wyalong, Australia
- Height: 1.91 m (6 ft 3 in)
- Weight: 94 kg (14 st 11 lb)
- Notable relative(s): Scott Staniforth, brother Nigel Staniforth, brother Tony Gelling, uncle

Rugby union career
- Position: Fullback / Wing
Amateur team(s)
Years	Team	Apps	(Points)
1999	Southern Districts		
2005-06	Glasgow Hawks		
2011-12	Southern Districts		
2012-13	Orange Emus		
Senior career
Years	Team	Apps	(Points)
2004-05	Exeter Chiefs		
2005-06	Glasgow Warriors	18	(15)
2006-11	Aurillac		
Provincial / State sides
Years	Team	Apps	(Points)
2003-04	Southland		
Super Rugby
Years	Team	Apps	(Points)
-	New South Wales Waratahs		
National sevens team
Years	Team		Comps
-	Australia 7s		
Coaching career
- Years: Team
- 2013-: Orange Emus
- 2016-: CWRU Blue Bulls (Asst.)

Graydon Staniforth (born 23 November 1973 in West Wyalong, Australia) is a former Australian Sevens international rugby union player and now coach who played fullback and on the wing for Glasgow Warriors.

Staniforth started playing with Australian Universities before moving on to Southern Districts and the Waratahs academy side.

He moved to play in New Zealand for provincial side Southland in season 2003-04.

Graydon moved to Exeter Chiefs in 2004.

Staniforth signed for the professional provincial Scottish side Glasgow Warriors in 2005. Head coach Hugh Campbell stated: "We have a fair number of young backs in the squad at the moment and we felt a player of Graydon's experience would have a lot to offer the squad as a whole both on and off the pitch. I'm sure his strong and hard running style will make sure he fits in well at Hughenden and we're very pleased to welcome him on board"

When not involved with the Warriors, Graydon played for Glasgow Hawks

Graydon played 18 times for the Warriors. He made 13 appearances in the Celtic League scoring 3 tries; and made another 5 appearances in the Heineken Cup of 2005-06. He also represented the Warriors in their 7s side.

On leaving Glasgow Warriors, Staniforth joined French side Aurillac where his younger brother Scott was playing. In Graydon's first year with Aurillac they were promoted from Federale 1 to the French ProD2, the second-tier of French professional rugby union. He stayed with Aurillac till 2011.

He returned to Australia to play first for Southern Districts in 2011 then for the Orange Emus in 2012.

Graydon has represented Australia in 7s and has also featured in an Australia Legends squad in 10s.

Graydon is the brother of Australian rugby international Scott Staniforth, and the nephew of Australian rugby international Tony Gelling. He is now the coach of the Orange Emus in Central West Rugby Union in Australia and a Property Valuer at Saunders and Staniforth, a real estate firm.
