= Cliff Campbell =

Australian rugby union player

- Full name: Clifford Norman Campbell
- Born: 11 October 1908 Sydney, NSW, Australia
- Died: 7 August 1966 (aged 57)
- Height: 5 ft 9 in (175 cm)
- Weight: 162 lb (73 kg)
- School: Sydney Grammar School

Rugby union career
- Position: Fly-half
Provincial / State sides
Years	Team	Apps	(Points)
1932–34	New South Wales	4	(3)
International career
Years	Team	Apps	(Points)
1933	Australia		

Clifford Norman Campbell (11 October 1908 – 7 August 1966) was an Australian international rugby union player.

Campbell was born in Sydney and educated at Sydney Grammar School.

A Drummoyne fly-half, Campbell made the Wallabies squad for their 1933 tour to South Africa, where he made a total of seven uncapped appearances, with Ron Biilmann preferred for the Test matches.

Campbell lived on the New South Wales Central Coast.

== See also ==
- List of Australia national rugby union players
