= Oskar Kokoschka Prize =

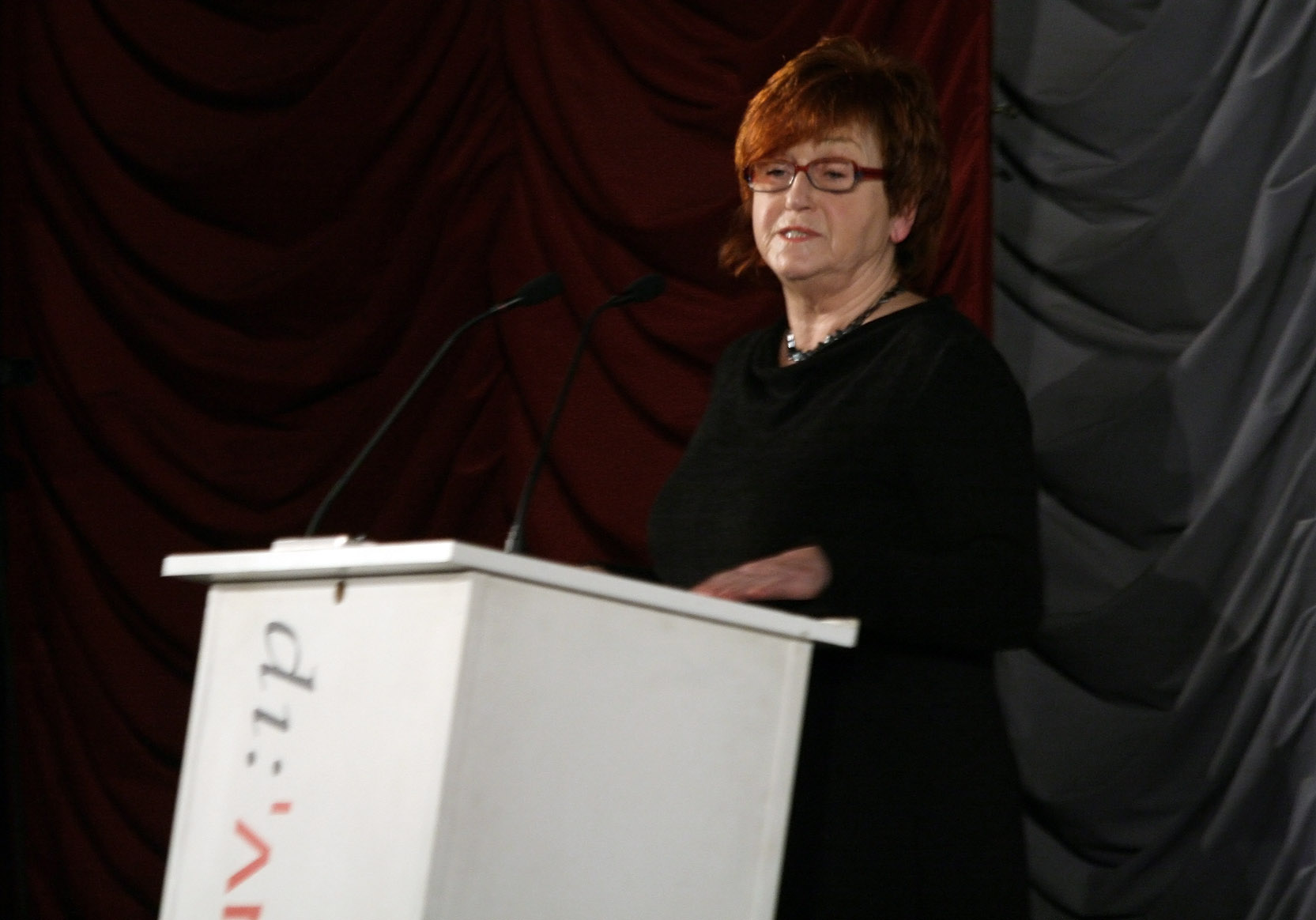
VALIE EXPORT, laureate of 2000, delivering the laudation for Yoko Ono (2012)

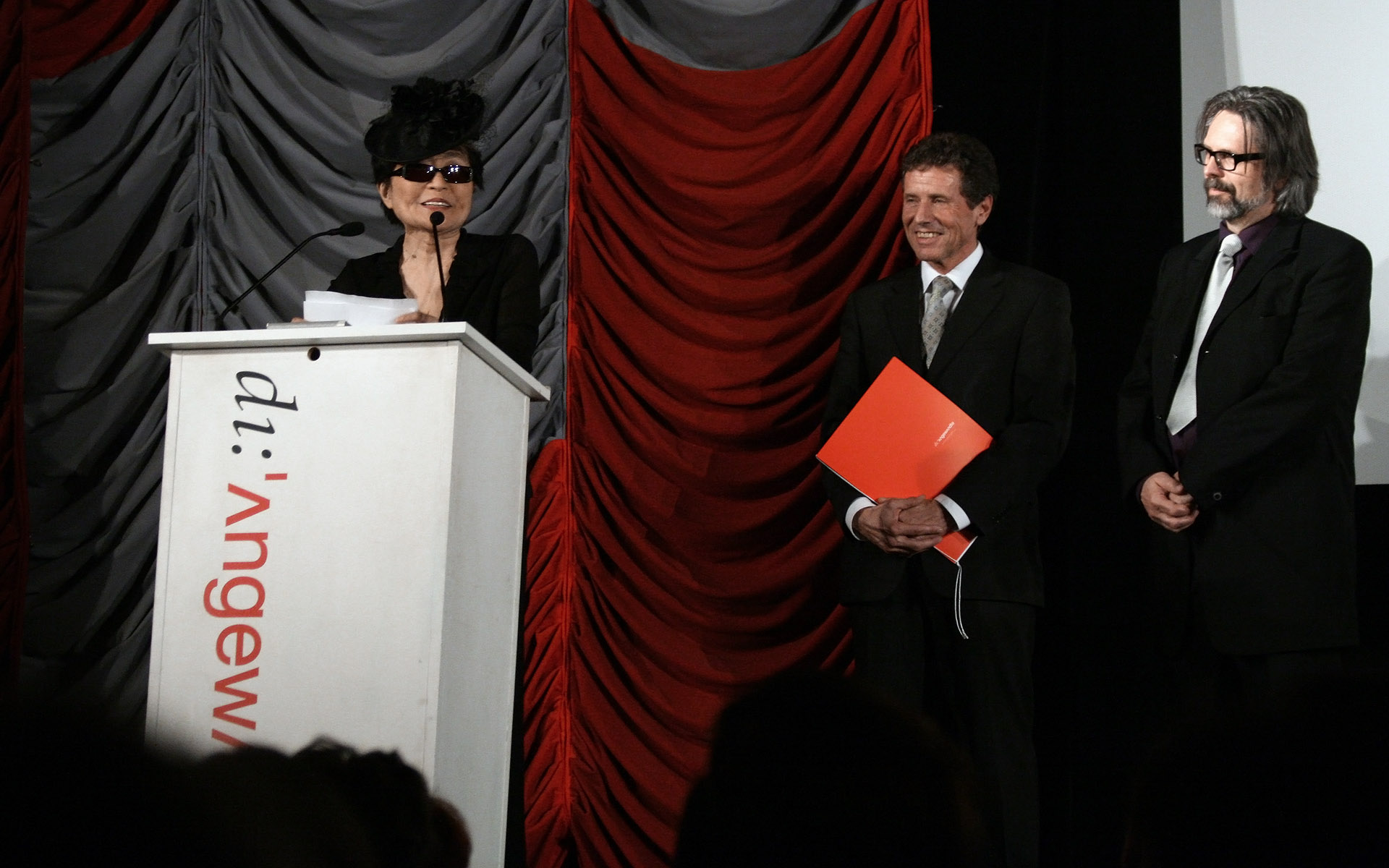
Yoko Ono, laureate of 2012, with rector Gerald Bast and minister Karlheinz Töchterle

The Oskar Kokoschka Prize (German: Oskar-Kokoschka-Preis) is a state prize of the Austrian federal government. Established in 1980, it is awarded every two years on 1 March, the birthday of Oskar Kokoschka (1886–1980), by the Federal Ministry for Science and Research for outstanding achievements in the field of visual arts. The chair of the jury is the current rector of the University of Applied Arts Vienna. The prize is endowed with €20,000.

In the 1960s, a separate Oskar Kokoschka Prize was also awarded by the City of Salzburg.

== Austrian State Prize for Fine Arts ==
- 1924: Franz Gruber-Gleichenberg, Austrian State Prize for Painting
- 1930: Robert Eigenberger, Austrian State Prize for Painting
- 1934: Walter Ritter
- 1937: Alexander Silveri
- 1961: Elfriede Ettl (Watercolour)
- 1970: Rudolf Hausner, Austrian State Prize for Painting

== Oskar Kokoschka Prize laureates since 1980 ==
- 1981: Hans Hartung
- 1983: Mario Merz
- 1985: Gerhard Richter
- 1986: Siegfried Anzinger
- 1987: Richard Artschwager (declined)
- 1990: Artists of the Gugging group
- 1992: Agnes Martin
- 1994: Jannis Kounellis
- 1996: John Baldessari
- 1998: Maria Lassnig
- 2000: VALIE EXPORT
- 2002: Ilya Kabakov
- 2004: Günter Brus
- 2006: Martha Rosler
- 2008: William Kentridge
- 2010: Raymond Pettibon
- 2012: Yoko Ono
- 2014: Peter Weibel
- 2016: Andrea Fraser
- 2018: Martha Jungwirth
- 2020: Monica Bonvicini
- 2022: Lawrence Weiner (posthumously)
- 2024: Miriam Cahn
- 2026: Jakob Lena Knebl and Ashley Hans Scheirl

== Oskar Kokoschka Prize of the City of Salzburg ==
- 1961: Linde Waber
- 1961: Gernot Rumpf (Sculpture)
