= Jack Young (rugby union) =

- Full name: John Barrett Young
- Born: 21 June 1912 Sydney, Australia
- Died: 10 July 1995 (aged 83)

Rugby union career
- Position: Centre
International career
Years	Team	Apps	(Points)
1933	Australia		

John Barrett Young (21 June 1912 – 10 July 1995) was an Australian international rugby union player.

Young was born in Sydney and learned his rugby at Parramatta Intermediate School.

A utility back, Young was primarily a centre, but could also play five–eighth and on the wing. He played his early rugby for Cumberland in Sydney's third grade, then within a season had made his way up from the St. George reserves to play at the top level in Sydney. His twin brother, Ralph, was a St. George teammate and Sydney representative player.

Young was a member of the Wallabies squad for their 1933 tour of South Africa. Due to his quick rise, Young was a relatively unknown and it has been suggested that selectors had intended to call up Jim Young, who unlike John was a state representative player. He appeared in seven uncapped matches during the tour and scored four tries.

== See also ==
- List of Australia national rugby union players
