= Brother (Australian band) =

- Origin: Bathurst, New South Wales, Australia
- Genres: Celtic rock
- Years active: 1992–present
- Labels: Rhubarb
- Members: Angus Richardson; Dave Allen; Drew Reid (DidgeriDrew); Michael Saint John
- Past members: Fergus Richardson; Hamish Richardson; Rick Kurek; Roel Kuiper; Steve Luxenberg; Brett Dengate
- Website: brothermusic.com

Brother are an Australian rock band formed in Bathurst, New South Wales, in 1992. Their music combines elements of Celtic rock and Australian rock, incorporating traditional instruments such as bagpipes and the didgeridoo. The band releases its recordings through their independent label, Rhubarb Records.

== History ==
The Richardson brothers – Hamish, Angus and Fergus – grew up in Bathurst and attended the Scots School, where they participated in the School's pipe band. Brother formed in 1992 around the nucleus of the Richardson brothers with Hamish on didgeridoo, bagpipes and guitar, Angus on bass guitar and bagpipes, and Fergus on guitar and bagpipes. They began touring pubs in Sydney.

After releasing their first album, Black and White, which they had self-produced for their own label, Rhubarb Records in 1992. Their track, "An Daorach Beag", was used on the soundtrack to the film, Baraka (September 1992). In the following year they scored an opening spot on Joe Walsh's Australian tour.

Fergus left Brother in 1996 and worked as a filmmaker. He was based in Arizona, running a boutique production house, with his wife.

A live album, 2000's This Way Up, was met with critical acclaim and an opportunity to perform at the Rock and Roll Hall of Fame.

In March 2007, Hamish left the band to live on the south coast of New South Wales, working in journalism and running a 50-member secular gospel choir.

In 2007 the song "Photograph" by Brother appeared on a compilation CD containing songs associated with Bathurst.

The band mainly plays in the United States but returns to Bathurst regularly. They have undertaken numerous tours around the US and the world. They have played Milwaukee, Wisconsin's Summerfest and Bethlehem, Pennsylvania's Musikfest.

In 2011, Brother served a British band, also named Brother, with a writ asserting trademark infringement; the Australian group won the legal case, and the British group changed its name to Viva Brother.

== Members ==
Current members

- Angus Richardson — vocals, guitars, bass, bagpipes
- Dave "Dalbo" Allen — drums, percussion, vocals
- Drew Reid — didgeridoo, whistle, keyboards, melodica, vocals

Past members

- Hamish Richardson — vocals, bagpipes, didgeridoo, whistle, guitars, keyboards
- Fergus Richardson — vocals, guitars, mandolin, bagpipes, whistle, keyboards

== Discography ==
=== Albums ===
- Black White (1992)
- Pipe Dreams (1994)
- Exit From Screechville (1995)
- Black Stone Tramp (1996)
- Digging Bone (1997)
- Your Backyard (1998)
- This Way Up (2000) (live)
- I You You Me (2001)
- Urban Cave (2003)
- Pax Romana MMV (2005)
- The Terrain Around Here is Far Too Dangerous (live - Two Roads Theatre 02.26.06)
- As You Were (compilation, 2006)
- One Day (2008)
- out from under (2010)
- From the Dreamtime to the Meantime (2013)
- Last Man Standing (2015)

=== DVDs ===
- Mongrel Mythology Vol. 1
