= Ronnie Bauser =

South African rugby union player

Grand Master of Lodge de Goede Hoop (South African Freemasons)
- In office 1991–1997
- Preceded by: Groenewald, C.B.
- Succeeded by: Lindeque, B.G.

President of Griqualand West Rugby Union
- In office 1977–1992
- Preceded by: Hammond, W.
- Succeeded by: Markgraaff, A.T.

Personal details
- Born: Reunert Sidney Bauser; 25 December 1928 Kimberley, Cape Province, South Africa
- Died: 28 December 2017 (aged 89) Kimberley, Cape Province South Africa
- Spouse: Valerie Faith
- Relations: Ethene Joan (sister) Jothene (niece) Chirene (niece)
- Parent: Virginia Caroline (mother)
- Known for: Griquas Rugby, Freemasonry
- He was Mayor of Kimberley for 5 Years

Ronnie Bauser
Rugby union career
- Position: Lock
Provincial / State sides
Years	Team	Apps	(Points)
1951–1952	Griqualand West	10	
Coaching career
- Years: Team
- 1958–1971: De Beers Rugby Club
Refereeing career
Years	Competition		Apps
1958–1969	Provincial		

Rugby selection

Rugby Selector for Griqualand West
- In office 1969–1970

Reunert Sidney Bauser (1928–2017) was a South African involved in all the aspects of the provincial rugby team, Griquas, and a Grand Master of The Freemasons in South Africa.

== Roots ==
Bauser was born on 25 December 1928 in Kimberley, Cape Province, South Africa. He was the son of Cecil Reunert Bauser and Virginia Coetzee. He married Valerie Faith in 1952. The couple had three children. He died on 28 December 2017 in Kimberley. Kimberley is a city in the Northern Cape Province, South Africa. It is also the capital of the province. Kimberley is known for diamond mining.

== Education and career ==
Bauser completed his schooling at CBC. At CBC he was captain of both the first team in rugby and cricket. Thereafter he qualified himself as an office technician in Johannesburg, Transvaal. He started to work at De Beers, a diamond company in the labour relations division. He worked at De Beers for 40 years.

== Sport ==
=== Rugby player ===
He played rugby in the lock position for the provincial team Griqualand West in 1951 to 1952. A knee injury stopped his rugby career. He played with Springbok fly half/centre Ian Kirkpatrick for the Griqua team. Griqualand West is area located centrally in South Africa, and is part of the Northern Cape

=== Coach ===
He coached a local Kimberley rugby club called De Beers rugby club from 1958 to 1971.

=== Referee ===
Bauser was a provincial rugby referee between 1958 and 1969.

=== Provincial selector ===
Ronnie Bauser was a provincial selector for the Griqualand West Rugby Union in 1969–1970. In 1970 the Griquas won the Currie Cup. The Currie Cup series is the local provincial rugby team playing against each other.

=== President of Griqualand West Rugby Union ===
From 1977 to 1992 he was president of the union. He succeeded W. Hammond. In 1992 A.T. Markgraaff took over from him. While he was president he was against dirty play in rugby.

== Freemasonry ==
He was Grand Master of the Freemasons in South Africa, from 1991 to 1997. He succeeded C.B. Groenewald. In 1997 B.G. Lindeque took over from him.
