= Boetsap =

- Location within Northern Cape Location within South Africa
- Coordinates: 27.971°S 24.450°E
- Country: South Africa
- Province: Northern Cape
- District: Frances Baard
- Municipality: Dikgatlong
- Established: 1883
- Time zone: UTC+2 (SAST)

Boetsap is a private owned village between towns Prieska, Warrenton, Douglas and Reivilo. Its situated in the Northern Cape, South Africa

== Beginnings ==
The area today known as Boetsap belonged to the Griqua King, Barend Barendse. Moselekatse beaten him in a battle and took the land over. In 1879 William Hunter took it over and in his turn sold it to Archibald Cochran. Cochran sold it to the congregation of Kimberley and du Toitspan. In 1883 it formed its own congregation and a town was founded, calling it Cathcart West. It was changed to Boetsap in 1890. (Old missionaries recorded it as Bootschap) The area then was divided into two separate areas Boetsap and Klein (small) Boetsap. Klein Boetsap became Reivilo. Boetsap later became in the possession of H Pagan.

== Naming origin ==
The name originates out of Tswana. It’s called after the word “Mabuchapella”. The meaning is Mother of Fertility (referring to an animal). From Tswana bucwa, 'fat', 'sleek', it is said to refer to the condition of the cattle there.

== Location ==
It’s on the foot of the Ghaapse Plateau. David Livingstone, the explorer and Missionary when looking at trees decided to call the valley to Boetsap “Forest Hill”. This was in the 1800s before the formal town settling.

== School and Nursing home ==
On 1 June 1883 a school, accommodating children from SubA (Grade 1) and Standard 6(Grade 8) was opened with 25 children. The first principal was D Viljoen. Later D Nelson was principal from 1923-1954. A Nursing home was also opened in the late 1930s.

== Limestone formation and asbestos ==
In the 1930s Prof Young from Wits did some studies here regarding Stromatolite. Asbestos mining also took place in the area. The Asbestos Mountains rise from the Ghaap Plateau and is called that due to the mining that took place in the 20th century

== Notable residents ==
Edwill van Aarde South African radio and television personality, grew up there.
