= No. 82 Squadron RAAF =

Royal Australian Air Force squadron

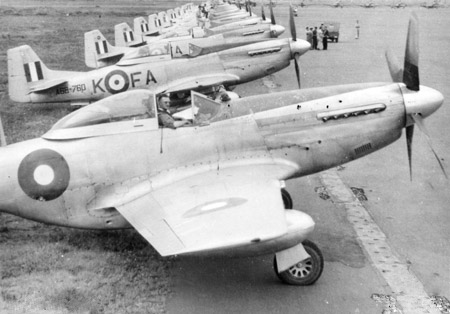
- No. 82 Squadron Mustang fighters in Japan, 1947
- Active: 1943–1948
- Country: Australia
- Branch: Royal Australian Air Force
- Role: Fighter
- Part of: No. 81 Wing
- Engagements: World War II: South West Pacific theatre; Battle of North Borneo; Occupation of Japan

Insignia
- Squadron code: FA

Aircraft flown
- Fighter: P-40 Kittyhawk; P-39 Airacobra; P-51 Mustang

No. 82 Squadron RAAF was a Royal Australian Air Force fighter squadron that operated during World War II and its immediate aftermath. It was formed in June 1943, flying Curtiss P-40 Kittyhawks and, initially, Bell P-39 Airacobras from bases in Queensland and New Guinea. The squadron became operational in September 1944, and undertook ground attack missions against Japanese targets in the Pacific theatre. Following the end of hostilities, No. 82 Squadron was re-equipped with North American P-51 Mustangs and deployed to Japan, where it formed part of the British Commonwealth Occupation Force. It remained there until October 1948, when it was disbanded.

== History ==
=== World War II ===
During 1943, the Royal Australian Air Force (RAAF) received 399 Curtiss P-40 Kittyhawk fighter aircraft. Their arrival allowed the service to expand its combat force by forming five new Kittyhawk-equipped squadrons to join the three squadrons that had operated the type in the South West Pacific area since 1942. No. 82 Squadron was formed at Bankstown, New South Wales, on 18 June 1943. It was the third of the new Kittyhawk squadrons to be established, following No. 84 Squadron in February and No. 86 Squadron in March; No. 78 Squadron was formed in July and No. 80 Squadron in September. Commanded by Squadron Leader Stanley Galton, No. 82 Squadron's original complement was 279, including fifteen officers. It was to have been equipped wholly with P-40M Kittyhawks but initially included a flight of Bell P-39 Airacobras. No. 82 Squadron conducted training at Bankstown until April 1944, when personnel briefly moved to Hughes Airfield in the Northern Territory, before being redeployed to Townsville, Queensland, for further training.

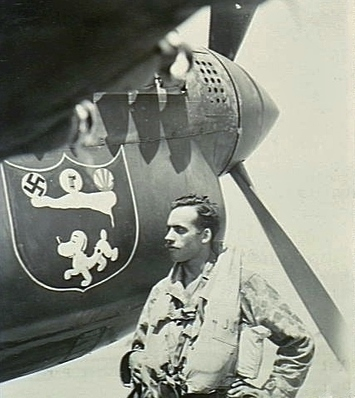
Flight Lieutenant Frank Schaaf of No. 82 Squadron at Labuan, North Borneo. The nose art on his Kittyhawk is a legacy of his membership of the "Desert Harassers" in the Middle East.

The squadron transferred to Port Moresby, New Guinea, at the end of August 1944 and then to Noemfoor in mid-September, joining Nos. 76 and 77 Squadrons as part of No. 81 Wing under No. 10 Operational Group (later First Tactical Air Force). Three of No. 82 Squadron's Kittyhawks crashed due to engine trouble while staging through Nadzab and Tadji. Operating from Kamiri strip on Noemfoor, the squadron flew its first combat mission on 30 September, bombing Samate airstrip with aircraft from No. 77 Squadron. On 18 October, one aircraft was lost to ground fire during an attack on Kai Island, and another was reported missing. It was difficult for No. 82 Squadron to stay operational as most of its ground crew remained in Townsville until moving forward the following month; in the meantime, the pilots were responsible for arming and refuelling their aircraft. On 23 November, they dive bombed Japanese airfields on Halmahera with aircraft of No. 76 Squadron.

No. 82 Squadron continued to conduct ground attack missions in New Guinea until March 1945, when it relocated to Morotai Island in the Netherlands East Indies (NEI). From Morotai, the squadron conducted ground-attack missions in the NEI and escorted Allied convoys carrying troops bound for the liberation of Borneo. The relegation of First Tactical Air Force to areas of operation bypassed by the main Allied thrust towards the Philippines and Japan led to poor morale, culminating in the so-called "Morotai Mutiny" of April 1945. Squadron Leader Bert Grace, commanding officer of No. 82 Squadron, was among eight senior pilots who tended their resignations in protest at what they saw as the waste of resources on targets of dubious military value. The officers were persuaded to continue on operations, and Grace oversaw the squadron's move to Labuan island in June as part of Operation Oboe Six, the invasion of North Borneo. The Kittyhawks flew in support of Australian Army units until the end of the war. On one such mission on 8 August 1945, No. 82 Squadron made a 900-mile (1,400 km) round trip to attack targets around Kuching in Sarawak. During the first strike two Japanese aircraft were destroyed as they were taking off from the airstrip; a transport was also destroyed and two more were damaged. The fighters then attacked several barges near Kuching Town and on the Sarawak River. Fourteen members of the squadron were killed on operations during the war.

=== Occupation of Japan ===
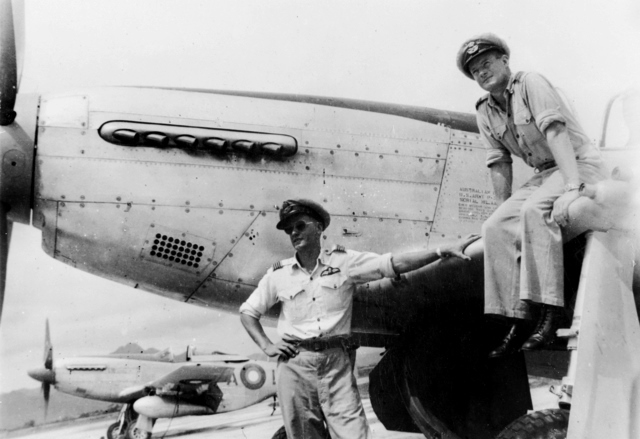
Two No. 82 Squadron members, brothers Venn and Cliff Williams, with a Mustang in Japan, 1947

Shortly after the end of the war, No. 82 Squadron was selected to join the British Commonwealth Occupation Force (BCOF) in Japan. It re-equipped with North American P-51D Mustang fighters between 12 September and 11 January 1946, losing two aircraft to accidents in the process. The squadron deployed to Bofu, a former kamikaze base, during 13–18 March 1946, once again as part of No. 81 Wing with Nos. 76 and 77 Squadrons; Nos. 381 and 481 Squadrons provided logistics and maintenance support, respectively. No. 82 Squadron lost three of its twenty-eight Mustangs, along with an escorting de Havilland Mosquito, in bad weather en route to Bofu, killing all crew members. From April 1946, the squadron conducted surveillance patrols over Japan as well as participating in routine exercises and flypasts. The Australians found that, far from offering resistance, the Japanese went out of their way to be accommodating. No. 82 Squadron's commanding officer, Squadron Leader Graham Falconer, remarked following a dinner with Bofu's mayor, "I felt that we were being treated more as visitors than as an occupying force!"

No. 81 Wing transferred to Iwakuni in April 1948, the same month that the Federal government decided to reduce Australia's contribution to BCOF. As part of this reduction, Nos. 76 and 82 Squadrons were slated for disbandment, leaving No. 77 Squadron as the sole RAAF fighter unit in the country. No. 82 Squadron conducted further training and exercises until September, and was disbanded at Iwakuni on 29 October 1948.
