= Owen Bridle =

- Full name: Owen Lawman Bridle
- Born: 28 July 1910 Exmouth, Devon, England
- Died: 24 April 1983 (aged 72) Melbourne, Australia

Rugby union career
- Position: Flanker
International career
Years	Team	Apps	(Points)
1931–36	Australia	12	(15)

Owen Lawman Bridle (28 July 1910 — 24 April 1983) was an Australian rugby union international.

Born in Exmouth, Devon, Bridle grew up in England but was a product of Melbourne rugby.

Bridle played his early Melbourne rugby for St. Kilda and in 1931 made the Wallabies team for a tour of New Zealand, where he appeared in the match against NZ Maori, which retrospectively became his first Test cap. Although a forward, he possessed considerable speed, helping him to score regular tries. He was the team's second top try scorer on the 1933 tour of South Africa, across 15 tour matches. The following year, Bridle played in a historic first Bledisloe Cup series win for the Wallabies over the All Blacks. He was capped 12 times in total for the Wallabies.

Having trained with VFL club Footscray in 1937, Bridle found himself disqualified from amateur rugby by the Victorian Rugby Union for a year and was unable to make his way back into the Wallabies lineup.

== See also ==
- List of Australia national rugby union players
