= Jack Kelaher =

Australia international rugby union player

- Full name: John Desmond Kelaher
- Born: 5 February 1912 Barraba, NSW, Australia
- Died: 31 July 1990 (aged 78)
- Notable relative: Tim Kelaher (nephew)

Rugby union career
- Position: Wing
International career
Years	Team	Apps	(Points)
1933–38	Australia	13	(9)

John Desmond Kelaher (5 February 1912 — 31 July 1990) was an Australian rugby union international.

Kelaher was born in Barraba, New South Wales and boarded at St Joseph's College, where he was a member of two GPS 1st XV premiership teams. He played first-grade for Drummoyne straight out of school.

Known as "Jockey" on account of his small stature, Kelaher was a speedy winger and gained 13 Test caps for the Wallabies during the 1930s. He featured in all five Test matches against the Springboks on the 1933 tour of South Africa and scored a hat-trick of tries in an uncapped match against Rhodesia. The following year, Kelaher was on the Wallabies team that won a maiden Bledisloe Cup series over the All Blacks.

Kelaher's nephew Tim Kelaher was a Wallabies fullback of the early 1990s.

== See also ==
- List of Australia national rugby union players
