= Zali Steggall =

Australian politician and alpine skier (born 1974)

Zali Steggall OAM MP
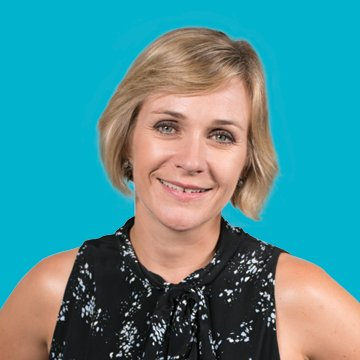
- Steggall in 2019

Member of the Australian Parliament for Warringah
- Incumbent
- Assumed office 18 May 2019
- Preceded by: Tony Abbott

Personal details
- Born: 16 April 1974 (age 52) Manly, New South Wales, Australia
- Party: Community Strong (since 2026)
- Other political affiliations: Independent (until 2026)
- Spouses: David Cameron (m. 1999; div. 2007) Tim Irving (m. 2008)
- Relatives: Jack Steggall (grandfather); Zeke Steggall (brother)
- Education: Griffith University (BA)
- Website: www.zalisteggall.com.au
- Sports career
- Country: Australia
- Sport: Alpine skiing
- Event: Slalom
Medal record
International freestyle ski competitions
Event	1st	2nd	3rd
Olympic Games	0	0	1
World Championships	1	0	0
Total	1	0	1
Women's alpine skiing
Representing Australia
Olympic Games
Bronze medal – third place	1998 Nagano	Slalom
World Ski Championships
Gold medal – first place	1999 Vail	Slalom

Zali Steggall (born 16 April 1974) is an Australian politician, barrister, and former Winter Olympic athlete. She has been the member of Parliament (MP) for the New South Wales division of Warringah since the 2019 federal election when she defeated the incumbent, former Prime Minister Tony Abbott.

Prior to entering politics, Steggall was an internationally successful alpine skier, winning a bronze medal in slalom at the 1998 Winter Olympics in Nagano, and a World Championship gold medal in 1999. She is Australia's first individual medallist and first female medallist at the Winter Olympics. Steggall's Olympic career extended from Albertville in 1992 to Salt Lake City in 2002.

After her Olympic career, Steggall studied law and began working as a solicitor, and then as a barrister. Steggall also became involved in several NGOs, including serving as director of the Sport Australia Hall of Fame from 2014 to 2019. At the 2019 Australian federal election, Steggall ran as an independent candidate, winning the seat of Warringah. She increased her margin at both the 2022 and at the 2025 federal elections.

== Early life ==
Steggall was born in Manly, New South Wales, in 1974. She and her family lived in France from 1978 until 1989, and she started ski racing at the resort of Morzine in the French Alps. Her parents had intended to stay for only 18 months, but they liked the lifestyle so much that they stayed. Her mother, Dr. Susan Steggall, documented these ten years in the book Alpine Beach. A Family Adventure.

Steggall won European age championships at the ages of 10 and 13, and was a member of the French junior skiing team at the age of 14. Steggall was educated in Sydney at Queenwood School for Girls following the family's return to Australia in 1989.

Steggall's grandfather Jack Steggall played ten Tests for Australia in rugby union, and her father played rugby for Northern Suburbs, Manly Rugby Club and Manly Lifesavers. Her brother is Olympic snowboarder Zeke Steggall.

== Skiing career (1992–2002) ==
Despite moving back to Australia, the Steggall siblings regularly travelled to the northern hemisphere to train. She was also sent overseas by the Australian Ski Institute to train under Austrian alpine coach Helmut Spiegl.

Steggall was selected to make her Olympic debut in Albertville in 1992, at the age of 17. She came 23rd out of 44 entries in the giant slalom event, and failed to finish the slalom or the combined event. At the 1994 Olympics in Lillehammer, the size of the field was reduced. Steggall came 22nd out of 28 athletes in the slalom and 24th and last in the giant slalom. She withdrew from the super-G and was unplaced in the overall standings.

In December 1995, Steggall broke into the top 10 in a World Cup event, placing 10th in the slalom event at Sankt Anton. In January 1996, Steggall came fourth at the World Championships in Sestriere, Italy, missing bronze by 0.04 seconds.

Steggall came into the 1998 Winter Olympics in Nagano as one of the medal favourites. Three months earlier, she had become the first Australian woman to win a World Cup event in alpine skiing, after winning the slalom event at Park City, Utah. She posted the fastest time in both of her runs to win by 0.78 seconds. She then came fifth, sixth and tenth in the next three World Cup events to be ranked sixth in the world. Steggall won a Europa Cup event at Piancavallo. She won Australia's first individual Winter Olympic medal with a bronze in slalom skiing at Nagano in 1998. Her time of 1 minute 32.67 seconds was 0.27 seconds behind the winner. In December, Steggall placed second in a World Cup event at Mammoth Mountain, missing the gold medal by 0.01 seconds to Anja Pärson. This 2nd place finish made her the first woman from Australia to win an alpine medal in a World Cup competition. She had earlier placed second at Park City, giving her an overall ranking of seventh.

Steggall's success prompted the Australian Olympic Committee to expand the Australian Ski Institute into the Olympic Winter Institute of Australia. It was given a million-dollar annual budget and for the first time, Australia had a federal government-funded full-time training program to accompany the Australian Institute of Sport. It operated in six sports and supported 37 athletes and resulted in an immediate upturn in results, with numerous athletes going on to win gold for Australia across the winter sport disciplines.

In 1999, Steggall won the slalom event at the World Championships held in Vail, Colorado, in the United States, the first championship of any athlete from the southern hemisphere. Steggall's Olympic career ended at the 2002 Winter Olympics in Salt Lake City, where she failed to complete her first run and was eliminated.

Steggall was part of the Sydney Olympic torch relay in September 2000, carrying the Olympic flame along the pathway of Olympians in Manly and on the Manly ferry to Circular Quay. In 2004, she was part of the Athens Olympic torch relay, carrying the Olympic flame to the top of the Sydney Harbour Bridge.

== Legal career (2002–2019) ==
Steggall retired from skiing in 2002. She completed a Bachelor of Arts, majoring in communications and media studies from Griffith University, Brisbane, Queensland, and then completed a Diploma of Law. She was admitted as a solicitor while working for her father's legal practice in Manly, New South Wales. In 2008, she was admitted to the NSW Bar. Her principal areas of practice as a barrister were family law, sports law, and commercial law. Between 2010 and 2013, Steggall was councillor to the NSW Bar Association and served as the chair of its Health, Sports, and Recreation Committee.

From 2014 to 2019, Steggall was an independent non-executive director of the Olympic Winter Institute of Australia, and director of the Sport Australia Hall of Fame. In 2014, Steggall became a member of the Australian Sports Anti-Doping Agency (ASADA) Anti-Doping Rule Violation Panel. She was appointed an arbitrator of the Court of Arbitration for Sport (CAS) in January 2017. In 2018, Steggall was one of 12 worldwide arbitrators appointed to the ad hoc tribunal of the CAS for the Pyeongchang Winter Olympic Games, and she became a member of the Council of Governors at Queenwood School for Girls.

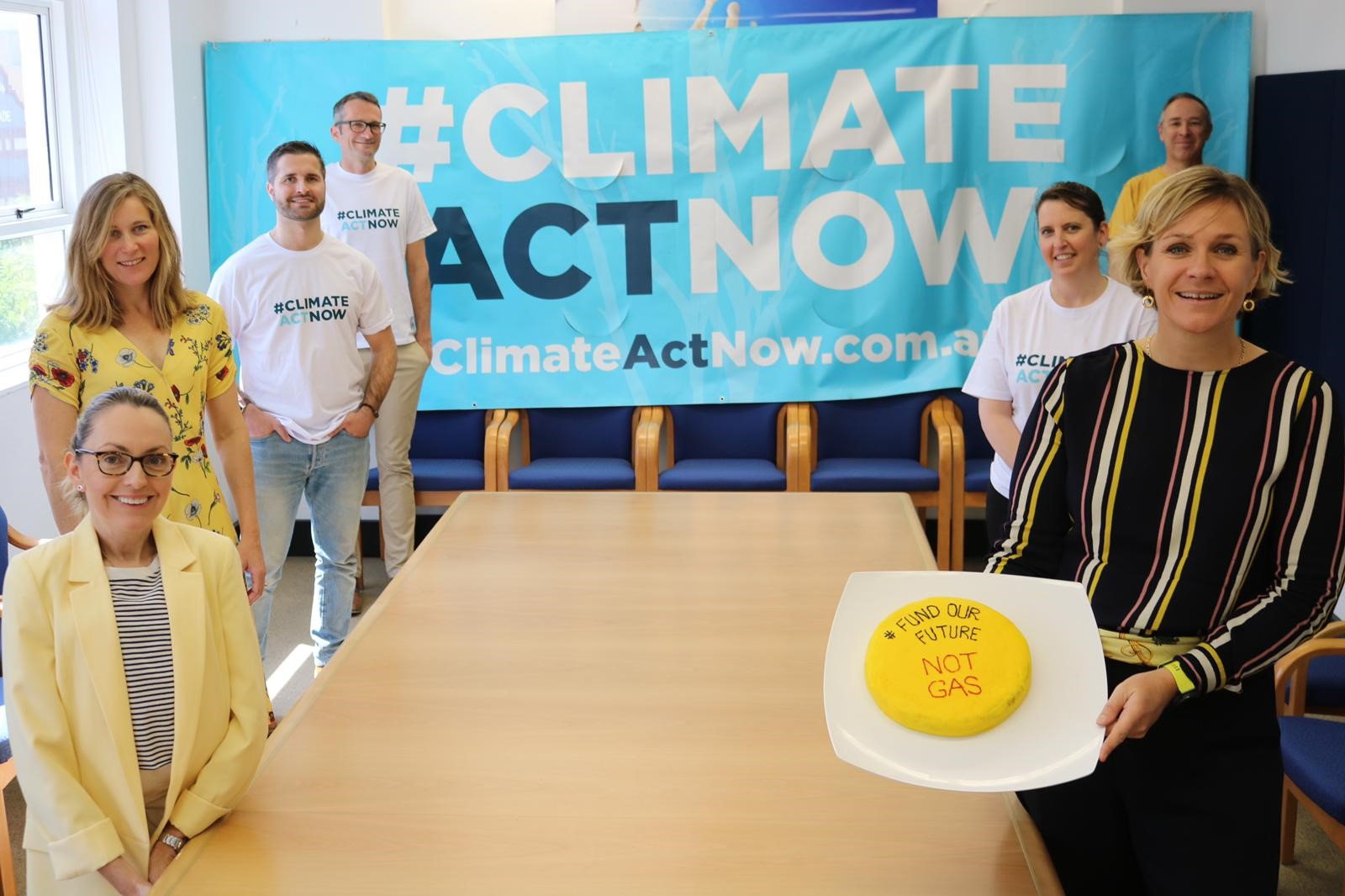
Steggall (right) in 2020 with climate activists in her electorate office

== 2019 election ==
On 27 January 2019, Steggall announced her candidacy as an independent in the Division of Warringah in the 2019 Australian federal election, running against former Australian Prime Minister and incumbent Liberal MP Tony Abbott on a platform advocating action on climate change, mental health and honest government. Steggall also opposed the changes to capital gains tax, franking credits, and negative gearing that were being proposed by the Labor opposition under Bill Shorten, and argued for lower taxes on small businesses.

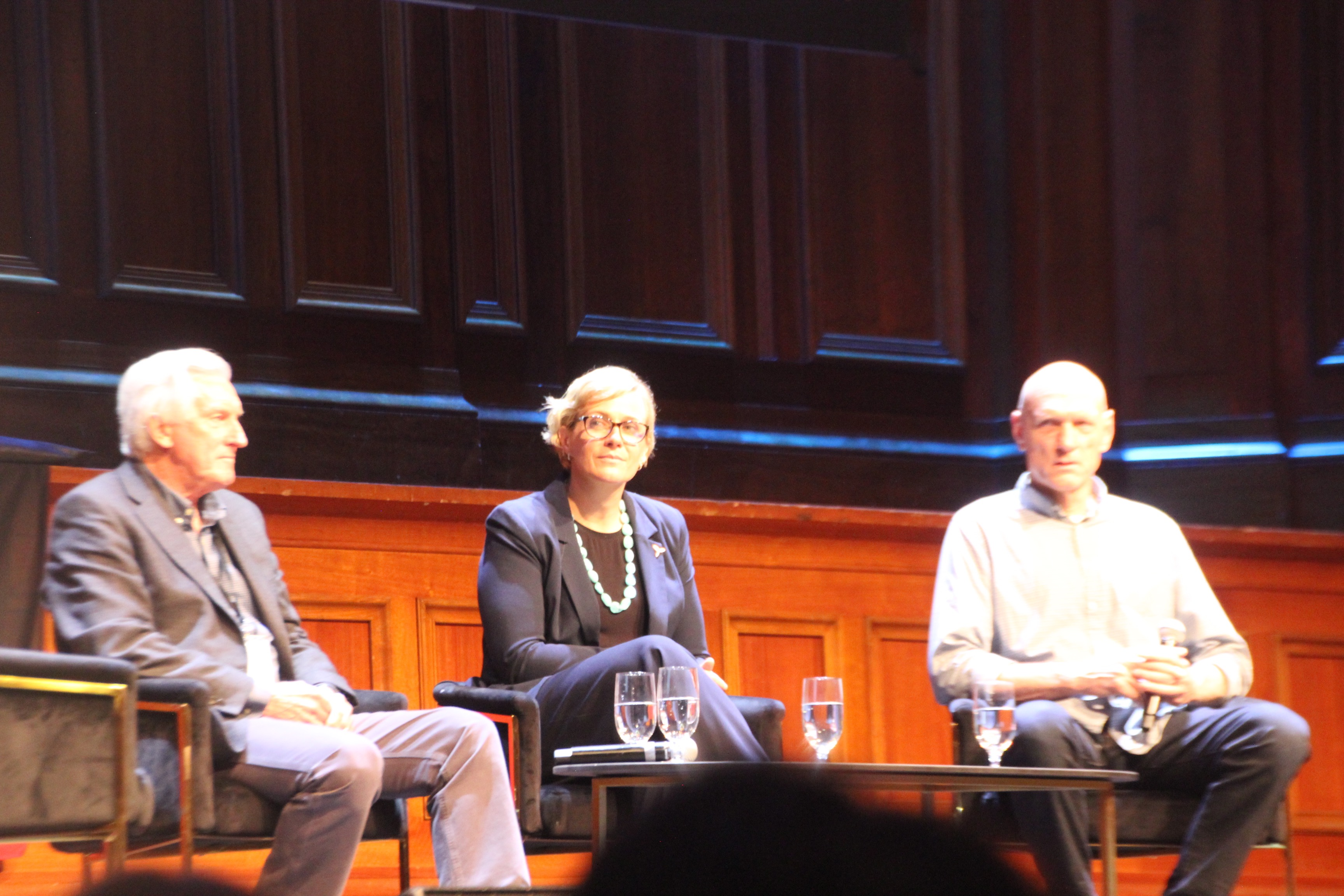
Steggall (centre) at the National Climate Emergency Summit in Melbourne in 2020, with John Hewson (left) and Peter Garrett (right)

During the campaign, Steggall was the subject of a smear campaign focused on her Wikipedia page; she called on Abbott to condemn it. She also stated that she would advocate for changes in electoral laws, to mandate a "minimum standard of truth" in political advertising. On 2 May, Steggall and Abbott participated in a televised debate in front of a live audience of voters.

Steggall and Abbott clashed on measures to address climate change, such as stronger vehicle emissions standards, and support for electric cars and charging stations. Abbott opposed subsidizing the car industry. Although Steggall did not favour a mandate for 50 percent electric vehicles by 2030, she supported policies that would move toward that target and sufficient charging stations to support the higher electric use. She stated that with better controls in place, emissions could be reduced more than 45 percent by 2030. She also supported the creation of an independent advisory to phase out dependence on coal and spur development of renewable energy projects.

Steggall raised $1.1 million AUD in funding for her campaign from 1378 donors. This was the most funding of any independent candidate at the 2019 election, and the highest number of individual donors of any campaign. $104,000 AUD was contributed by the former director of the Australian branch of the World Wide Fund for Nature, Robert Purves, and his sister, Sandra Purves.

At the 18 May 2019 election, Steggall defeated Abbott, who had held Warringah since a 1994 by-election. Steggall won the seat with a two candidate preferred vote of 57.24%. Abbott had a margin of 11 percent but lost over 12 percent of his primary vote in comparison with 2016, and finished just under 4,100 votes behind Steggall on the first preference count. Her victory marked the first time that the traditional blue-ribbon Liberal seat had been out of the hands of the Liberals or their predecessors since its formation in 1922. Steggall has been described as the pioneer of the teal independents, who combined conservative views on economics with progressive views on the environment and won several seats at the 2022 federal election.

== Member of Parliament (2019–present) ==
=== First term ===
Steggall served on the Standing Committee on Environment and Energy and the Joint Select Committee for Australia's Family Law System Reform from 2019 to 2022. In November 2020, she stated her opposition to the merging of the Family Court with the Federal Circuit Court, because it would overburden judges already dealing with excessive case loads, and eliminate the specialized and supportive nature of the Family Court. Steggall stated that the law should balance the rights of mothers and fathers but to avoid polarization should focus on the rights of children. She also objected to live broadcasting of the committee's inquiry after Pauline Hanson's One Nation's live-stream allowed commenters to attack witnesses.

As part of the "Bring Julian Assange Home" parliamentary group, Steggall opposed the extradition of Assange from the UK to the United States on espionage charges. In October 2021, Steggall introduced a bill entitled Commonwealth Electoral Amendment (Stop the Lies) Bill, to crack down on political misinformation. The bill was not supported by any major party. The following month, she said that she did not support Australia's diplomatic boycott of the 2022 Beijing Winter Olympics, saying that athletes should not be pressured to make political statements for their governments.

=== Second term ===
During the 2022 federal election campaign, Steggall called for Liberal candidate Katherine Deves to be disendorsed over her transphobic comments, and described the comments as "toxic, ill-informed and offensive". Steggall criticised Prime Minister Scott Morrison for choosing Deves as a candidate, stating that "[Morrison] either knew her views and selected her anyway, or he wasn’t properly informed and made a flawed decision". Steggall also criticised Deves' campaign for hiring the wife of Steggall's ex-husband, calling this "low and vindictive" behaviour. On 6 May, posters were placed around the electorate that falsely claimed Steggall to be a member of the Australian Greens. Similar incidents also occurred targeting fellow independent candidates Sophie Scamps (Mackellar) and Georgia Steele (Hughes).

Steggall received $25,000 AUD in funding from Climate 200 for her campaign. She was criticised for failing to disclose a A$100,000 from a family trust controlled by a former coal investor in the previous election cycle. The A$100,000 was split into eight separate donations by Warringah Independent Ltd, the fundraising entity hired by Steggall's campaign, to keep them under the disclosure threshold of A$13,800. Under the rules in place, Steggall did not have to report the donation because Warringah Independent was responsible for filing the disclosures, but when auditors discovered the mistake, she "personally disclosed the donation", according to journalist Rob Harris. Steggall retained her seat in the 2022 federal election, defeating Deves, and increasing her margin by 3.72% on a two-party preferred basis.

Steggall became a member of the House of Representatives Standing Committee on Climate Change, Energy, Environment and Water in August 2022. She was vocal about housing affordability, economic inequalities and supporting businesses. In August 2023, Steggall supported measures that prevented large multinational companies from evading tax. She also supported protecting retirees' superannuation from excessive taxation. She was in favour of the Yes vote in the unsuccessful October 2023 Australian Indigenous Voice referendum, which proposed the creation of an advisory body for First Nations Australians to advise on issues relevant to them. She took part in a "Run for the Voice" event to promote the Yes campaign, and was "gutted" that the referendum did not succeed.

Steggall reintroduced her political misinformation legislation, in November 2023, but it was again unsuccessful. In January 2024, Steggall criticised Prime Minister Anthony Albanese for making changes to the planned stage three tax cuts. The changes included reducing the overall tax rate and giving larger cuts to individuals earning under A$200,000 annually. Steggall was not opposed to the tax cuts because the economy had changed, but she was critical that the tax legislation was amended after the government had insisted that it would not make changes.

In 2024, Steggall accused Liberal leader Peter Dutton of racism over his support for prohibiting Gazans from attaining Australian visas amid the Gaza war.

=== Third term ===
In 2025, Steggall won a third term, increasing her majority in her seat.

On 25 June 2026, Steggall announced she was forming the Community Strong Australia party with fellow teal MP Allegra Spender.

== Personal life ==
Steggall was married to Olympic rower David Cameron from 1999 until their separation in 2006. They have two children from their marriage. Steggall met marketing executive Tim Irving in 2007, they became engaged in June 2008 and married later that year.

== Honours ==
Steggall received an Australian Sports Medal in 2000, and a Medal of the Order of Australia in 2007. She was inducted into the Australian Institute of Sport 'Best of the Best' in 2001 and the Sport Australia Hall of Fame in 2004.

A blue trail called "Zali's" in Blue Cow, Perisher is named after Steggall.

== See also ==
- Skiing in Australia
- Voices groups in Australia

== Notes ==
Parliament of Australia
Preceded by Tony Abbott	Member for Warringah; 2019–present	Incumbent
