= All Saints' College, Bathurst =

All Saints' College Bathurst

Location
- Bathurst, New South Wales; Australia
- Coordinates: 33°23′48″S 149°33′43″E

Information
- Type: Independent co-ed Anglican private school
- Motto: Deo Auctore Vim Promovemus Insitam; With God as our guide, we develop the inner strength
- Established: 1873
- Founder: Canon Thomas Smith
- Closed: 2018
- Faculty: 53 (31 full-time and 22 part-time)
- Enrolment: ~ 500 (K–12) (2016)
- Colour(s): Red and navy blue
- Slogan: Educating the whole person for the challenges of a changing world
- Website: http://www.saints.nsw.edu.au

All Saints' College was an independent, co-educational Christian college in the Anglican tradition. It was established in 1874, and closed in 2018 to merge with The Scots School, Bathurst, to form Scots All Saints' College, with campuses in Bathurst and Lithgow, New South Wales. Up until its merger, the college catered for day students from pre-kindergarten to Year 12, and boarders from Years 7 to 12.

== History ==
=== Early years to 1900s ===
In 1873, following the closure of W. H. Savigny's college, Canon Thomas Smith of All Saints' Cathedral, Bathurst, with the support of Bishop Samuel Marsden began the process of starting the School. The following year, on 27 January, the Bathurst Church of England College opened its doors to seven students under the headmastership of Henry Kemmis. Renamed All Saints' College, the school officially came into being in mid-1875 when it moved to its permanent site on the corner of Piper and Hope Streets after a successful fund raising campaign and the Bishop's donation of land.

In 1888, Edward Bean, the Senior Classics Master of Sydney Grammar, and father of C.E.W. Bean, succeeded Henry Kemmis. During the eleven years of his headmastership, the college enrolment grew significantly. Bean produced the badge and motto, designed the uniform, commenced the Bathurstian (the school year book), introduced the prefect system, cadets, debating, dancing and carpentry, as well as opening a library and the Prep School.

The third Headmaster was Frederick Tracey. During his tenure representatives of the college attended meetings in 1892 to set up the Athletics Association of the Great Public Schools of New South Wales; the college didn't proceed to active membership of the GPS and has never taken part in any of its activities. In 1893 the Old Bathurstians' Union was started. With their support, Tracey purchased the school from the Church, thus becoming its proprietor, a position he maintained until 1919 when he sold the land and buildings to the NSW Government.

=== 1900s to 1950s ===
Originally the Assistant Master under Bean and Senior Master under Tracey, the fourth Headmaster was Mr Britten. During his tenure the college became involved in rugby, football and cricket; several boys went on to play for NSW and Australia. He also persuaded the Old Bathurstians' Union to finance the building of a Chapel which they later moved brick by brick to the college's present location on the then Ophir Road, now Eglinton Road.

In 1911, Britten was succeeded by George Stiles. A linguist and an amateur boxing champion at Oxford University, he promoted French and German and brought boxing to the college. With the coming of war in 1914, enrolments dropped, staff became difficult to obtain and prices soared. On 30 June 1919, Stiles resigned and the college closed.

In 1923, the headmaster of Monaro Grammar School, Cooma, Lindsay Watson, and one of his staff, Colin C F McLeod, sought permission to re-open the college on its present site after purchasing Esrom House and 20 acres (8.1 ha) of adjoining land. The nearby Travellers' Rest Hotel was purchased for additional classrooms, and Walmer House on the river was leased for boarders.

In 1925, the OBU moved the chapel from the schools' original location to its current site on the existing school grounds.

In 1946 Lindsay Watson retired and was succeeded by Alan Catley, who resigned in 1948 and was succeeded by Ted Evans as headmaster, for fifteen years. During this time the college grew from a student population of 108 to 315.

=== 1960s to 2000s ===
In 1963, Roy Dent, founding Headmaster of Sydney Grammar Preparatory School, took over from Evans. He oversaw the inauguration of the Avern Award (for meritorious service to the college) and the republication of the history of the college.

In 1966, there were three headmasters: Roy Dent resigned, Vic Tunbridge from Geelong Grammar School took over as acting Headmaster, and later in the year the Council appointed Peter Gebhardt as the tenth headmaster. He introduced programmes including Eastern-Western Week (work experience), Outdoor Education and Arts and Artists Week, most of which continue today. He also initiated the building of the H.R. Richardson Memorial Library and Watson College (now Watson Boarding House).

Dan Massey was appointed Headmaster in 1975. He introduced co-education in 1976, and was instrumental in the college amalgamating with Marsden Girls School in 1977. In 1982, the Junior School was reopened under Doug Finlay.

Dan Massey resigned at the end of 1983 and Deputy Headmaster Bruce Clydsdale, took over until Robert Bickerdike was appointed in 1985. Previously Principal of Girton College and Head of Geelong Grammar's Timbertop, Bickerdike was headmaster for eight years, during which buildings were added and student numbers increased.

Doug Finlay left as Master of the Junior School in December 1989 and was succeeded by Jock Bidwell in January 1990.

In 1993 Timothy Wright, formerly Second Master at Trinity Grammar Sydney, became headmaster. During his time as Headmaster, formal Pastoral Care Structure was developed and implemented within the college timetable. Wright oversaw the development of college facilities such as the building of the Foundation Block and the Evans Block, and the refurbishment of the Science Labs. The second stage of the Junior School Development was also completed during his time. In 1998 the inaugural Transition to School class commenced with a full complement. Dr Wright was appointed to Shore (Sydney Church of England Grammar School) in 2003.

=== 2000s to closure ===
Jenny Williams joined All Saints' College from Snowy Mountains Grammar at the start of 2003. She continued the development of the college, overseeing the refurbishment of Britten House, the Dining Room, the Music and IT Centres and the front of Esrom House. Williams remained as Head of college until 20 March 2008 when she accepted the position of Head of Samuel Marsden Collegiate School in Wellington, New Zealand.

During the interim period following Williams' departure and the arrival of her successor, Stewart Ross (Head of Senior School) took over as Acting Head of college.

At the end of 2007, Jock Bidwell resigned as Head of Junior School after 18 years in post; he and his wife left travelled to Tanzania to work at the School of St Jude. Christopher Jackman took up the role of Head of Junior School from the start of the 2008 academic year.

Peter Miller was appointed Head of college at the start of Term 3, 2008. He had previously been Head of Middle School at Barker College, Sydney. Miller had received a Rowing Blue at Sydney University and represented Australia in the Senior B Lightweight Four. Steven O'Connor started as Head of college at the start of Term 2, 2016.

The school closed in November 2018.

== Academic standing ==
In 2011, All Saints' College ranked 33rd in Higher School Certificate (HSC) results in NSW. Among NSW private Schools, it ranked 17th in the State.

== Sporting history ==
In 1999, All Saints' College First XV rugby team went undefeated in both the WAS and ISA Div 2 competitions. All Saints' devoted their outstanding season to one their favourite sons who died at the start of the rugby season. The Sydney Morning Herald dedicated its final rugby column of 1999 to the efforts of the All Saints' First XV.

== Notable alumni ==
- C. E. W. Bean – World War I historian
- Ron Biilmann (1908–1963) – rugby union player
- Simon Chapman AO PhD FASSA (born 1951) – Professor of Public Health, University of Sydney
- Terence Clarke AM – composer and theatre director (also attended Shore School; later taught at ASC)
- Tim Ferguson – comedian
- Bobby Gibbes OAM, DSO, DFC (1916–2007) – World War II flying ace
- Arthur Charles Hall VC – soldier, grazier, Victoria Cross recipient
- Gerry Harvey (born 1939) – entrepreneur and co-founder of Harvey Norman
- James Roy Kinghorn – naturalist and broadcaster
- Gavin Merrick Long OBE (1901–1968) – World War II historian
- Tom McKibbin (1870–1939) – test cricketer
- Kylie Moore-Gilbert – academic in Islamic studies and political prisoner
- Scott Staniforth (born 1977) – rugby union player
- Sir Charles Wade KCMG (1863–1922) – Premier of New South Wales (1907–1910)

== See also ==
- List of Anglican schools in New South Wales
- Anglican education in Australia
- List of boarding schools in Australia
