= Edwill van Aarde =

South African broadcaster (1938–2024)

- Born: 20 December 1938; Kimberley, Northern Cape, South Africa
- Died: 3 January 2024 (aged 85); Krugersdorp, Gauteng, South Africa
- Education: Diamantveld High School
- Occupations: Broadcaster and sport commentator
- Known for: Sport broadcasting, Radio and television programme presenter

Edwill van Aarde (20 December 1938 – 3 January 2024) was a South African television and radio broadcaster and sports commentator. He was the presenter and commentator with the longest uninterrupted service at any broadcaster in South Africa, 50 years (in 2011).

== Personal life ==
Edwill van Aarde was born on 20 December 1938 in Kimberley, South Africa. He grew up in Boetsap. He attended Vaalharts Primary school and Diamantveld High School, where he matriculated in 1957. He was married to Piena Margeretha Forbes Ochse. Edwill van Aarde died on 3 January 2024, at the age of 85.

== Sports commentary ==
Van Aarde broadcast 517 cricket games, 134 Rugby matches, 12 Comrades marathons, and 5 Wimbledon men's tennis finals.

== Radio ==
Van Aarde presented the radio program Afrikaans treffers, which translated means "the biggest Afrikaans hits". This was a music program which played the biggest hits from all over the world. This program was 40 years old in 2015.

== Television ==
Van Aarde was the presenter of Flinkdink ("Fast Thinking”), a general knowledge quiz program. He was later also the organiser and researcher of the program.

== Attack ==
Van Aarde was attacked in his home in Krugersdorp on 29 March 2010. He survived the attack.
