= Jack Steggall =

- Full name: John Cecil Steggall
- Born: 16 September 1909 Geraldton, Western Australia, Australia
- Died: 30 June 1985 (aged 75)
- School: Toowoomba Grammar School
- Notable relative(s): Zali Steggall (granddaughter); Zeke Steggall (grandson)
- Occupation: Solicitor

Rugby union career
- Position: Utility back
International career
Years	Team	Apps	(Points)
1931–33	Australia	10	(9)

John Cecil Steggall (16 September 1909 — 30 June 1985) was an Australian rugby union international.

Steggall, born in Geraldton, Western Australia, was educated at Toowoomba Grammar School. He was a South Queensland rugby league representative before he switched to rugby union when the sport got revived in Queensland in 1930, earning state honours his first season. A utility back, Steggall was capped 10 times for the Wallabies, debuting on the 1931 tour of New Zealand. He played all five Tests against the Springboks on the 1933 tour of South Africa. During his career, Steggall became the only Wallaby to have started Tests as a centre, fly half, fullback and wing.

A solicitor by profession, Steggall was the grandfather of Winter Olympians Zeke and Zali Steggall.

== See also ==
- List of Australia national rugby union players
