= Bernie Doneley =

- Full name: John Bernard Tyson Doneley
- Born: 2 July 1909 Samford, QLD, Australia
- Died: 22 June 1972 (aged 62)
- Height: 6 ft (183 cm)
- Weight: 196 lb (89 kg)
- School: Nudgee College

Rugby union career
- Position: Back–row
Provincial / State sides
Years	Team	Apps	(Points)
- Queensland
International career
Years	Team	Apps	(Points)
1933	Australia		

John Bernard Tyson Doneley (2 July 1909 – 22 June 1972) was an Australian international rugby union player.

Doneley was born in Samford, near Brisbane, and attended Nudgee College.

A back rower, Doneley played for Brisbane club GPS and in 1933 gained Wallabies selection for a tour of South Africa. He featured in eight fixtures during the tour, but none of the Springboks matches, and was often utilised as a goal–kicker, registering 32 points. In 1934, Doneley represented an Australian XV against the touring All Blacks and kicked two penalty goals in a losing cause. He also played against the All Blacks for Queensland on the same tour. In six years of first grade in Brisbane, Doneley amassed a competition record 770 points, only once failing to pass a century of points in a season.

== See also ==
- List of Australia national rugby union players
