= Asbestos Mountains =

Range of hills in Northern Cape, South Africa

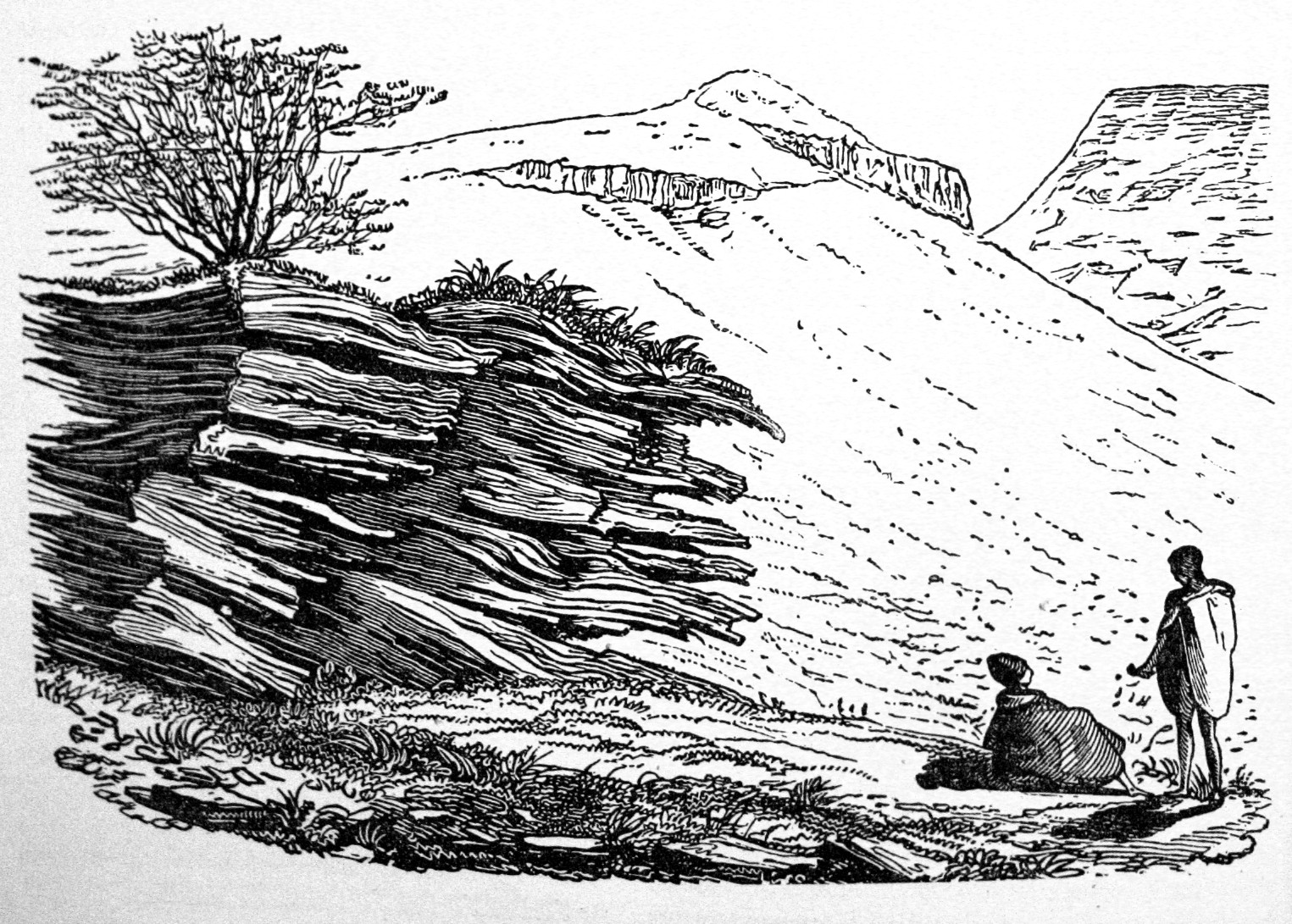
- Rocks in the Asbestos Mountains by William Burchell

Naming
- Etymology: Reference to asbestos mining in the 20th century

Geography
- Location within Northern Cape
- Country: South Africa
- Province: Northern Cape
- Range coordinates: 27°59′15″S 23°31′52″E

The Asbestos Mountains is a range of hills in the Northern Cape province of South Africa, stretching south-southwest from Kuruman, where the range is known as the Kuruman Hills, to Prieska. It passes Boetsap, Danielskuil, Lime Acres, Douglas and Griekwastad. The range lies about 150 kilometres (93 mi) west of Kimberley and rises from the Ghaap Plateau.

== Overview ==
The mountains were named after the asbestos which was mined in the 20th century and is found as a variety of amphibole called crocidolite. Veins occur in slaty rocks, and are associated with jasper and quartzite rich in magnetite and brown iron-ore. Geologically it belongs to the Griquatown series.

The Griquas, for whom Griquatown was named, were a Khoikhoi people who in 1800 were led by a freed slave, Adam Kok, from Piketberg in the western Cape to the foothills of the Asbestos Mountains where they settled at a place called Klaarwater. John Campbell, (1766–1840), a Scottish missionary in South Africa, renamed it Griquatown in 1813. The mission station became a staging post for expeditions to the interior - here David Livingstone met his future wife, Mary Moffat, daughter of the missionary Robert Moffat - William Burchell visited here in 1811.

John Campbell described the mountains in his book "Travels in South Africa: Undertaken at the request of the Missionary Society":

Daylight discovered the beauty of the scenery that surrounded Hardcastle. It lies in a valley not above three miles in circumference surrounded by the Asbestos Mountains of diversified shapes. There are four long passes between the mountains, leading from it in different directions, which not only increase the convenience of the situation, but add greatly to the grandeur of the prospect around. Some of us walked after breakfast to examine the asbestos rocks, where we found plenty of that rare mineral between strata of rocks. That which becomes, by a little beating, soft as cotton, is all of Prussian blue. When ascending a mountain alone, I found some of the colour of gold, but not soft, or of a cotton texture like the blue; some I found white, and brown, and green &c. Had this land been known to the ancients in the days of imperial Rome, many a mercantile pilgrimage would have been made to the Asbestos Mountains in Griqualand. Were the ladies' gowns in England woven of this substance, many lives would annually be saved, that are lost by their dress catching fire.

— John Campbell,

The coloured variants, which Campbell found, are named because of their chatoyance: tiger's eye, hawk's eye, and cat's eye by lapidaries, and are silicified crocidolite.

Wonderwerk Cave is located in the range near Kuruman and was occupied by man during the Later Stone Age, while much earlier manuports, introduced by hominins in the terminal Acheulean, have been found at the back of the cave.

== Mining history ==
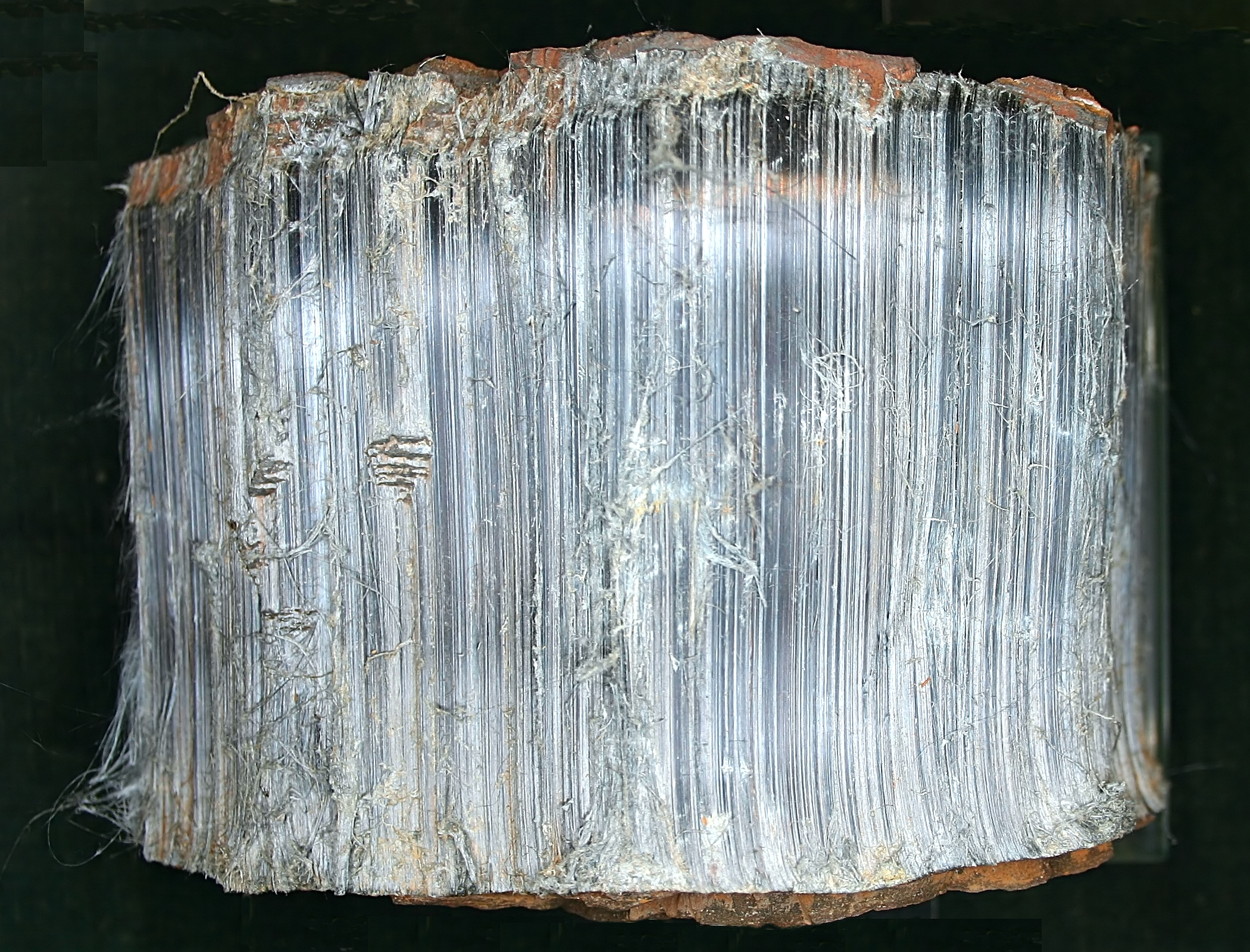
Crocidolite (blue asbestos), variety of riebeckite - Locality: Pomfret Mine, Vryburg

Serious mining of crocidolite in these mountains started in 1893 when open-cast quarrying produced 100 tons of material. By 1918, underground mining had started and scattered mines were to be found from Prieska to Kuruman along the length of the range, and mills were constructed at both of these towns. Between 1950 and 1960 production had risen to 100,000 tons, each mine was doing its own milling and the tailings dumps had grown in size.

== Health hazards ==
At the time of Campbell's writing the health hazards of asbestos were unknown. Tens of thousands of mine workers were exposed to the fibres at their workplaces, and when winds blew across the wastedumps, at their homes. By the mid-1950s the medical profession were still diagnosing asbestosis as "metastatic carcinomas from an unknown primary site". The resulting increase in cases of asbestosis and mesothelioma became alarming. Records later revealed that pleural endothelioma had first been reported in 1917, but had also been considered as metastatic. Substitutes for asbestos now include ceramic, carbon, metallic and Aramid fibers, such as Twaron or Kevlar.

David Goldblatt from the University of the Witwatersrand wrote:

Companies that mined asbestos in Western Australia and in South Africa were utterly contemptuous of the health of those who took the material out of the ground, those who milled, packed and transported it, those who lived anywhere near these operations, and of the land from which they took it. Long after the connections between asbestos and its related diseases were established, some as early as the 1920s, they continued their old methods of production and handling with hardly any change. Furthermore, they kept their workforces in ignorance of the dangers to which they were exposed and they suppressed research that harmed their own interests. When they had either worked out the ore or lost their markets because the world got wise to asbestos, they simply ceased operations and walked away, leaving suffering and death and vast quantities of lethal asbestos tailings and spillage to blow in the wind. The governments of the day were the other factor. Partly from inertia, partly for political and strategic reasons, the governments of Western Australia and South Africa were neither diligent in applying available knowledge to making asbestos mining safer, nor energetic in enforcing such regulations as they had. Indeed they were complicit in the perpetuation of conditions highly inimical to health and life in the mining of asbestos.

— David Goldblatt,

The Green Mountains, for which Vermont was named, were produced by the same geologic processes that produced the Asbestos Mountains - they produced an abundance of serpentine, which is the source of chrysotile asbestos.

== See also ==
- List of mountain ranges of South Africa
- Mining industry of South Africa
- Asbestos and the law
