= Bert Grace =

Australia international rugby union player (1912-1982)

Bert Grace DFC
- Full name: Bert Augustus Grace
- Born: 29 April 1912 Sydney, NSW, Australia
- Died: 28 March 1982 (aged 69) Vaucluse, NSW, Australia
- Height: 6 ft 1 in (185 cm)
- Weight: 178 lb (81 kg)
- School: Cranbrook School
- Occupation: Retail executive

Rugby union career
- Position: Centre / Wing
International career
Years	Team	Apps	(Points)
1933	Australia		

Bert Augustus Grace DFC (29 April 1912 — 28 March 1982), also known as Mick Grace, was an Australian retail executive and international rugby union player.

== Biography ==
Born in Sydney, Grace was the only son of Albert Edward Grace, co-founder of the Grace Bros department store chain.

Grace played rugby during his time at the Cranbrook School and afterwards competed as a centre for Sydney club Eastern Suburbs, winning a premiership in 1931. Following impressive performances for NSW in the 1932 Wallabies trials, Grace won an international call up for the 1933 tour of South Africa, selected to play on the right wing. He featured in five of the first eight tour matches in the lead up to the first Test, but his positional rival Doug McLean was preferred to play against the Springboks. By the end of the trip, Grace had played in ten tour matches, scoring four tries.

After the death of his father in 1938, Grace took over as chairman of Grace Bros. He flew with a Kittyhawk fighter squadron of the RAAF No. 82 Squadron during the war and was promoted to squadron leader. In 1944, Grace was awarded a Distinguished Flying Cross for his war service. He continued to head Grace Bros up until his death in 1982.
