= Tony Gelling =

- Full name: Anthony Massey Gelling
- Born: 1 February 1946 (age 80) West Wyalong, NSW, Australia

Rugby union career
- Position: No. 8 / Flanker
International career
Years	Team	Apps	(Points)
1972	Australia	2	(0)

Anthony Massey Gelling (born 1 February 1946) is an Australian former rugby union international.

Raised in West Wyalong, Gelling was a loose forward who was capped twice for the Wallabies. He had a tough initiation to representative football when as a 20 year old he was in the New South Wales Country side which played the visiting 1966 British Lions, before making his state debut two years later. His Wallabies caps came on the 1972 tour of New Zealand and Fiji, debuting in the 1st Bledisloe Cup in Wellington as a number eight. He gained his second cap as a flanker against Fiji in Suva. He was Australia's captain, coach and manager for the inaugural Hong Kong Sevens in 1977.

Gelling is an uncle of rugby players Graydon, Nigel and Scott Staniforth.

== See also ==
- List of Australia national rugby union players
