= St. Patrick's Christian Brothers' College, Kimberley =

St Patrick's Christian Brothers' College, Kimberley
- CBC
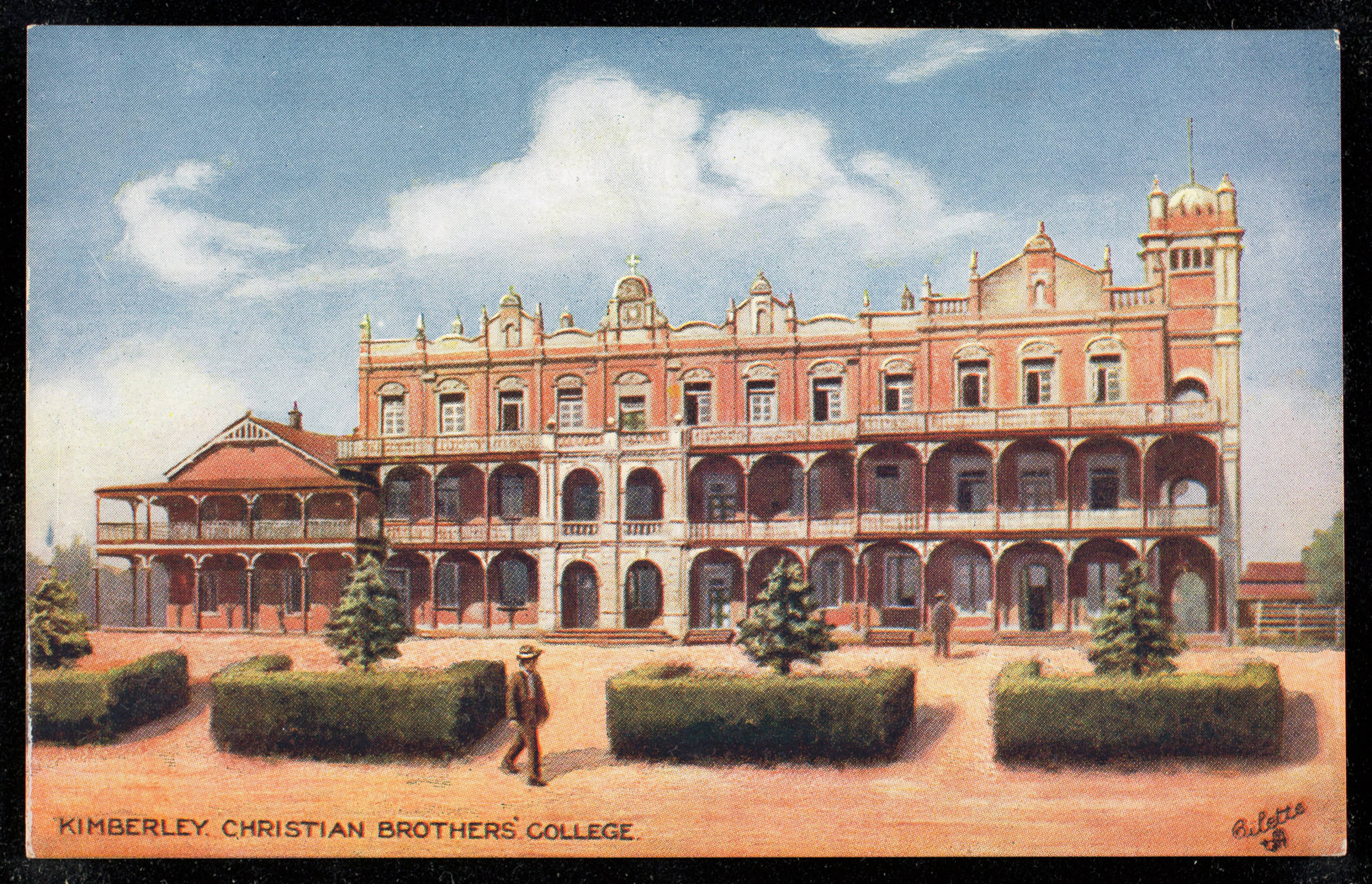

Location
- Kimberley, Northern Cape; South Africa; 28°44′52″S 24°46′34″E

Information
- School type: Independent School, regulated by the Independent Schools’ Association of Southern Africa (ISASA).
- Motto: Latin: Facere et Docere, lit. 'To do and to teach' and Latin: Age Quod Agis, lit. 'Translated: Do what you do well'
- Religious affiliation: Christian
- Denomination: Catholic
- Established: 1897
- Principal: Craig Neave
- Gender: Co-Ed
- Houses: Spiers, Cavanagh, Keeley, Michaelis
- Colours: Green, blue, yellow and red
- Rival: Diamantveld High School, Kimberley Boys' High School
- Feeder schools: Newton Primary School, Diamantveld Primary School, St Patricks CBC(Primary)
- Alumni: John Briscoe
- Website: stpatricks.co.za

Christian Brothers' College Kimberley (CBC), the first Christian Brothers' College (School) in South Africa, was founded by the Christian Brothers from Ireland, UK on 8 September 1897. It is situated in Kimberley, Northern Cape, South Africa. The founder was E.I.Rice. It is a Catholic High School.

== Beginnings ==
JJ Mullan was the first Head Master. In 1905, the school opened boarding facilities. These hostels were designed by Rogers and Ross. It was built by Church and MacLauchlin.

== School crest ==
The crest consists of a star, a cross, a circle and a book, that is open. It also shows the symbols A and Ω, Alpha and Omega. The meaning is:

- Star an indication of guidance.
- The circle shows eternity.
- Christ is pertained in the cross.
- The open book shows learning from an early age.
- The A and Ω is from Revelation 1:8 "I am Alpha and Omega, the beginning and the ending, saith the Lord, which is, and which was, and which is to come, the Almighty".

== School motto ==
Two mottos are used collectively:

- Latin: Facere et Docere, lit. 'To do and to teach' and
- Latin: Age Quod Agis, lit. 'Translated: Do what you do well'

== Temporarily closed ==
CBC was temporarily closed from 16 February 1900 to 7 May 1900. During World War I it was used as a military hospital. Teaching went ahead in tents erected on the schools premises. In 1933 a clock tower as erected as a memory to the soldiers that died in the war.

== Chapel ==
On the school's ground, a chapel was built which opened in 1923. It was designed by an Irish architect o'Connor, G.L.

== Today ==
It is a co-ed school, with English as medium of education. It is an Independent School, regulated by the Independent Schools Association of Southern Africa (ISASA).

== 1997 ==
In 1997, the school on its 100th year celebration decided to change its name to St Patrick CBC.

== Other CBC schools in South Africa ==
- Veritas College – Springs, Gauteng
- Christian Brothers' College, St John's Parklands – Cape Town, Western Cape
- Christian Brothers' College, St Joseph's – Bloemfontein, Free State
- St Dominic's College – Welkom, Free State

== Alumni ==
- Clive Derby-Lewis – A Conservative Party (South Africa) politician who was a collaborator with Janusz Walus in the assassination of Chris Hani.
- Tommy Bedford – Springbok rugby captain and apartheid critic.
- Donald Woods – Journalist and anti-apartheid activist.
- Frank Templeton Prince – British poet
- John Briscoe – An engineer (water) and received the Stockholm Water Prize.
- Pat Lyster – Springbok Rugby Wing, playing for the Springboks between 1933 and 1937.
- Reunert Sidney Bauser – Rugby administrator, Freemason Grand Master and Mayor of Kimberley.
- Thebe Magugu – fashion designer
