= Tim Kelaher =

Australia international rugby union player

- Full name: Timothy Patrick Kelaher
- Born: 24 July 1970 (age 56) Gosford, NSW, Australia
- Height: 6 ft 1 in (185 cm)
- Weight: 198 lb (90 kg)

Rugby union career
- Position: Fullback
Super Rugby
Years	Team	Apps	(Points)
1996	NSW Waratahs		
International career
Years	Team	Apps	(Points)
1992–93	Australia	3	(10)

Timothy Patrick Kelaher (born 24 July 1970) is an Australian former rugby union international.

Kelaher was born in Gosford and attended Sydney's St Joseph's College. He captained the St Joseph's College 1st XV to a premiership in 1989 and was an Australian schoolboys representative player.

A fullback, Kelaher played in the Shute Shield for Eastwood and Randwick.

Kelaher replaced his injured Waratahs teammate Marty Roebuck to start at fullback on his Test debut in 1992 against the All Blacks in Sydney. He kept his place in the squad for the spring tour later that year and came on off the bench in a convincing win over Ireland at Lansdowne Road. His third and final cap came in 1993 against the All Blacks in Dunedin, where he was given the team's goal-kicking duties. He was due to feature against the touring 1993 Springboks team but had to withdraw due to a bleeding duodenal ulcer. This also ruled him out of the end of season tour.

An uncle, Jack Kelaher, played for the Wallabies in the 1930s.

== See also ==
- List of Australia national rugby union players
