= Pat Lyster =

South African rugby union footballer (1913–2002)

- Full name: Patrick Joseph Lyster
- Born: 31 May 1913 Durban, South Africa
- Died: 25 July 2002 (aged 89) Somerset West, South Africa
- Height: 1.80 m (5 ft 11 in)
- Weight: 79.4 kg (175 lb)
- School: St Patrick's CBC Kimberley

Rugby union career
- Position: Wing three–quarter
Provincial / State sides
Years	Team	Apps	(Points)
- Natal
International career
Years	Team	Apps	(Points)
1933–37	South Africa	3	(0)

Patrick Joseph Lyster (31 May 1913 – 25 July 2002) was a South African international rugby union player.

== Biography ==
Born in Durban, Lyster attended school at Kimberley's Christian Brothers' College and as a 15 year old won the national junior 100 yards championship. He was still a teenager when he first played rugby for Natal.

Lyster, a three–quarter, was known for his swift movement and competed occasionally for the Springboks in the 1930s, gaining three caps. He debuted during their five match home series against the 1933 Wallabies, playing the Test matches in Durban and Bloemfontein, both on a wing. He toured with the 1937 Springboks to New Zealand and made his only international appearance in the opening Test at Athletic Park in Wellington.

Outside of rugby, Lyster was a barrister by profession. He served as a 2nd Lieutenant with the Natal Mounted Rifles in World War II, receiving the Military Cross for his role in the Western Desert campaign, during which was shot in the chest while fighting at El Alamein, but spared critical injuries when the bullet struck a book in his breast pocket.

Lyster's nephews, Dugald and Donald, were international rugby players for the Springboks and Scotland respectively.

== See also ==
- List of South Africa national rugby union players
