= Diamantveld High School =

- Hoërskool Diamantveld

Location
- 3 Voortrekker Road; Kimberley, Northern Cape; South Africa; 28.75072°S 24.7727°E

Information
- School type: Public & Boarding
- Motto: A posse ad esse (Making a possibility, a reality)
- Religious affiliation: Christianity
- Established: 28 January 1935; 91 years ago
- School district: District 4
- Principal: A. Viljoen (Acting principal)
- Grades: 8–12
- Gender: co-educational
- Age: 14 to 18
- Campus: Urban Campus
- Colours: Blue; White; Yellow
- Rival: Northern Cape High School, Adamantia High School, CBC
- Newspaper: Aitsa
- Feeder schools: Newton Primary School; Diamantveld Laerskool
- Alumni: Coenie Burger, Andries Thomas Markgraaff, Karen Muir, Philippus Jeremia Rudolf Steyn, Edwill van Aarde, Philip Rudolph van der Merwe
- Website: http://www.diamantveld.co.za/

Hoërskool Diamantveld is a public Afrikaans medium co-educational high school in Kimberley in the Northern Cape province of South Africa and the oldest Afrikaans school in Kimberley.

== Beginnings ==
It was founded on 28 January 1935 on the then closed Kimberley Teachers Training College hostels’ premises, and the first headmaster was Dr. O'Grady. It was first called Kimberley High School but in 1936 it changed to Diamantveld. Reverend Albertyn, J.R. headed the campaign to have an Afrikaans school established.

== Subsequent headmasters ==
Dr. O'Grady stayed on until 1960. During his tenure, the school relocated to the premises of Belgravia Primary School. The headmasters who followed him were: Cerff, S.M. (1960–1969); Spangenberg, J.P. (1969–1974); Heyns, M.G. (1974–1979); Auret, J.P. (1979–1996); du Toit, J.(1996–2012); and then Hugo, M. The current headmaster is Victor, L.

== Motto ==
A posse ad esse (in Latin).Translated: Making a possibility, a reality

== Gender and language ==
The school is a co-ed school in Afrikaans only.

== Hostels ==
Two hostels exist, namely J.P. Auret House and Dugmore House.

== School achievements ==
- The school had the best matric results in the Northern Cape Province in 2016.
- Diamantveld won the International AQUALIBRIUM Schools Water Competition in 2015 held in Johannesburg, South Africa. It is an engineering, mathematics and science competition. In 2015 the school had to design a water model for a water distribution network.

== International partnership ==
The school was in a partnership with PASCH Schulen, a worldwide German school group in 2010 when South Africa presented the Soccer World Cup. The partnership entailed learning German as a third or fourth language while encouraging them to play soccer. This was aimed at both boys and girls.

== Sport ==
The Wilde Klawer National Tournament, which brings together South Africa's top-performing high schools in rugby and netball, has been hosted at the school since 2014. The school's rugby fields are of a standard that provincial rugby can be played on. It is the only other pitch in the region that is of an acceptable standard. The main stadium is Griqua Park. Griquas, the region's senior rugby team, therefore play a few provincial games per season on the school's rugby fields. The region from which Griquas draw players is called the Northern Cape. (one of South Africa's nine provinces)

== Alumni ==
- Andries Thomas Markgraaff, ex-Springbok rugby coach and provincial player (position lock)
- Karen Muir, matriculated in 1970, ex–world record holder in swimming.
- Philippus Jeremia Rudolf Steyn, Proteas cricket opening batsman
- Edwill van Aarde, radio and television presenter. He matriculated in 1957
- Flippie van der Merwe, Springbok rugby player in 1981 (position prop)

== Individual achievements ==
- Alecia Brits - international science pupil.
- LM Joubert - first 16 year old rugby referee to be in charge of senior provincial rugby game.
- Lourens van Niekerk - winner of the countrywide Mathematics Olympia in 2012

== High Court case ==
The school took an application to the High Court of South Africa (Northern Cape Division) in 2004. The Head of the Department of Education (HOD) was the respondent. Diamantveld wanted to appoint teachers from outside the province, but the HOD overruled it. Judges Majiedt, J. and Tlaletsi, J. ruled against the school and in favour of the Department of Education. This created a precedent in South African law.
