= Andre Markgraaff =

South African rugby union player & RU administrator

President of Griqualand West Rugby Union
- In office 1992–1996
- Preceded by: Bauser, R.S.
- Succeeded by: Smith, T.
- Born: Andries Thomas Markgraaff; 23 December 1956 (age 69)
- School: Diamantveld High School
- University: Potchefstroom University for Christian Higher Education

Rugby union career
- Position: Lock
Provincial / State sides
Years	Team	Apps	(Points)
–	Western Transvaal		
-	Western Province		
-	Griqualand West		
–	South West Africa		
Coaching career
- Years: Team
- 1988–1990: Griqualand West
- 1996: Springboks
- 1998–2005: Cats

Andries Thomas "Andre" Markgraaff (born 23 December 1956) is a retired South African rugby union lock. He matriculated at Diamantveld High School and was a controversial national coach, who resigned after he was taped using the racial term kaffir.

== Playing career ==
Markgraaff was selected for the South African team in 1986 against the Cavaliers but as an unused substitute. Markgraaff also represented Western Transvaal, Western Province, Griqualand West and the then South West Africa in 20 games. He captained the South African Barbarians on a tour to Europe and the Junior Springboks.

== Coaching ==
In 1988, he became coach of Griqualand West. He became president of Griquas in 1991.

In 1996, Markgraaff was appointed as the Springbok rugby coach. In 1997 Markgraaff was forced to quit after his controversial racial statements, when he referred to a black senior rugby administrator Mluleki George as a "kaffir". In his apology, Markgraaff said

"I'm not making any excuses. I was very emotional at the time. I apologise to the black people of this country and to the whites for causing them embarrassment."

During his short reign the Springboks won eight and lost five tests.

In 1998, Markgraaff took the Griquas to victory in the Vodacom Cup and then to the semifinals of the Currie Cup, losing by 11–27 to the Western Province. He also coached the Cats in Super Rugby and was a founder of the PUK Rugby Institute.

Markgraaff made a comeback in rugby administration and was the Deputy President of SARFU and the convener of SARFU's technical committee.

Sporting positions
Preceded by (South Africa) Kitch Christie	South Africa National Rugby Union Coach; 1996–1996	Succeeded by (South Africa) Carel du Plessis
