= Central West Rugby Union =

Rugby union body in Australia

- Sport: Rugby Union
- Jurisdiction: Central West region of New South Wales, Australia
- Abbreviation: CWRU
- Affiliation: New South Wales Rugby Union
- Headquarters: New South Wales, Australia
- President: Frank Newman

Official website
- www.centralwestrugby.com.au

The Central West District Rugby Union, or CWRU, is the governing body for the sport of rugby union within the Central West district of New South Wales in Australia. It is a member of the New South Wales Country Rugby Union.

The competition is split into three different tiers. At one point, both the Blowes Cup and the New Holland Cup were the same competition until the split in 2017.

== History ==
Blowes Cup 1st Grade Premiers

- 1956 - Orange Wests
- 1957 - Molong
- 1958 - Orange Emus
- 1959 - Yeoval
- 1960 - Molong
- 1961 - Orange Emus
- 1962 - Orange Emus
- 1963 - Yeoval
- 1964 - Yeoval
- 1965 - Molong
- 1966 - Molong
- 1967 - Yeoval
- 1968 - Molong
- 1969 - Molong
- 1970 - Molong
- 1971 - Orange Emus
- 1972 - Orange Emus
- 1973 - Orange Emus
- 1974 - Mitchell
- 1975 - Dubbo Kangaroos & Orange City
- 1976 - Orange City
- 1977 - Bathurst
- 1978 - Mitchell
- 1979 - Bathurst
- 1980 - Orange Emus
- 1981 - Bathurst
- 1982 - Bathurst
- 1983 - Orange Emus
- 1984 - Orange City
- 1985 - Bathurst
- 1986 - Orange City
- 1987 - Dubbo Kangaroos
- 1988 - Orange City
- 1989 - Orange City
- 1990 - Orange City
- 1991 - Orange City
- 1992 - Orange City
- 1993 - Orange City
- 1994 - Bathurst
- 1995 - Dubbo Kangaroos
- 1996 - Bathurst
- 1997 - Bathurst
- 1998 - Bathurst
- 1999 - Orange Emus
- 2000 - Orange Emus
- 2001 - Orange Emus
- 2002 - Orange Emus
- 2003 - Forbes
- 2004 - Mitchell
- 2005 - Bathurst
- 2006 - Dubbo Kangaroos
- 2007 - Dubbo Kangaroos
- 2008 - Dubbo Kangaroos
- 2009 - Narromine
- 2010 - Bathurst
- 2011 - Parkes
- 2012 - Orange City
- 2013 - Orange City
- 2014 - Dubbo Kangaroos
- 2015 - Orange Emus
- 2016 - Orange Emus
- 2017 - Forbes
- 2018 - Orange Emus
- 2019 - Bathurst
- 2020 - Orange Emus
- 2021 - Cowra
- 2022 - Bathurst
- 2023 - Bathurst
- 2024 - Bathurst
- 2025 - Orange Emus
- 2026 - Dubbo Kangaroos

== Clubs ==
=== Blowes Clothing Cup teams (tier-one) ===
Club	City	Home Ground	No. of Premierships	Premierships	Foundation Date
Bathurst Bulldogs	Bathurst	Ann Ashwood Park	15	1977, 1979, 1981, 1982, 1985, 1994, 1996, 1997, 1998, 2005, 2010, 2019, 2022, 2023, 2024	1874
Cowra Eagles	Cowra	Cowra Rugby Ground	1	2021 (default Covid)	1967
Dubbo Kangaroos	Dubbo	Victoria Oval	8	1975*, 1987, 1995, 2006, 2007, 2008, 2014, 2026	1899
Forbes Platypi	Forbes	Grinstead Oval	2	2003, 2017	1968
Orange City	Orange	Pride Park	11	1976, 1984, 1986, 1988, 1989, 1990, 1991, 1992, 1993, 2012, 2013	
Orange Emus	Orange	Endeavour Oval	17	1958, 1961, 1962, 1971, 1972, 1973, 1975*, 1980, 1983, 1999, 2000, 2001, 2002, 2015, 2016, 2018, 2020, 2025	

=== New Holland Agriculture Cup teams (tier-two) ===
The New Holland Agriculture Cup was launched in 2018, following a major restructure of Central West Rugby Union competitions. CSU-Mitchell, Dubbo Rhinos, Mudgee Wombats, and Parkes Boars all transferred from the Blowes Cup Clothing Cup, while Narromine Gorrilas transferred from the North Cup and Blayney Rams from the South Cup, to make up the inaugural six clubs.

Blayney transferred to the Oilsplus North Cup for the 2020 season, before Molong Magpies move from the same competition ahead of the 2026 season brought the total teams back up to six.

Club	City	Home Ground	No. of Premierships	New Holland Cup Premierships	Foundation Date
CSU-Mitchell	Bathurst	University Oval (The Zoo)	1	2019	1974
Dubbo Rhinos	Dubbo	Apex Oval	0	None	1992
Molong Magpies	Molong	Molong Rugby Club	1	2026	1953
Mudgee Wombats	Mudgee	Glen Willow Sporting Complex	1	2024	1874
Narromine Gorillas	Narromine	Cale Oval	2	2018, 2025	1982
Parkes Boars	Parkes	Spicer Oval	4	2020, 2021, 2022, 2023	1967

Season	Final			Minor Premiers
Season	Premiers	Score	Runners-up	Minor Premiers
2018	Narromine Gorillas		Parkes Boars	
2019	CSU-Mitchell	30–29	Narromine Gorillas	Narromine Gorillas
2020	Parkes Boars	21–18	Mudgee Wombats	Mudgee Wombats
2021	Parkes Boars (Note: Parkes Boars awarded the title as minor premiers, due to the COVID-19 pandemic cancelling the season.)			
2022	Parkes Boars	23–20	Mudgee Wombats	Mudgee Wombats
2023	Parkes Boars	26–24	Mudgee Wombats	Mudgee Wombats
2024	Mudgee Wombats	26–15	Narromine Gorillas	Mudgee Wombats
2025	Narromine Gorillas	19–15	Mudgee Wombats	Narromine Gorillas
2026				Molong Magpies

=== Oilsplus Cup (tier-three north) ===
Club	City	Home Ground
Canowindra Pythons	Canowindra	Canowindra Rugby Club
Coonabarabran Kookaburras	Coonabarabran	Coonabarabran Rugby Club
Geurie Goats	Geurie	Geurie Rugby Club
Wellington Redbacks	Wellington	Wellington Rugby Club
Yeoval Eagles	Yeoval	Yeoval Rugby Club
Coolah Roos	Coolah	Bowen Oval, Coolah

=== South West Fuels Cup (tier-three south) ===
Club	City	Home Ground
Blayney Rams	Blayney	Blayney Rugby Club
Boorowa Goldies	Boorowa	Boorowa Rugby Club
Cootamundra Tri-Colours	Cootamundra	Cootamundra Rugby Club
Grenfell Panthers	Grenfell	Grenfell Rugby Club
Harden Red Devils	Harden	Harden Rugby Club
Temora Tuskers	Temora	Temora Recreation Ground
West Wyalong Weevils	West Wyalong	West Wyalong Rugby Club
Young Yabbies	Young	Cranfield Oval

=== See also ===
- Rugby union in New South Wales
- List of Australian club rugby union competitions
