= Max White (rugby union) =

Australian rugby union player (1908–1979)

- Full name: Maxwell Clarke White
- Born: 19 September 1908 Toowoomba, QLD, Australia
- Died: 5 September 1979 (aged 70)

Rugby union career
- Position: Forward
International career
Years	Team	Apps	(Points)
1931–33	Australia	9	(0)

Maxwell Clarke White (19 September 1908 – 5 September 1979) was an Australian rugby union international.

White, born in Toowoomba, Queensland, was the eldest son of Ray White, who founded the real estate agency of the same name. He attended The Southport School and played first-grade for Brisbane's YMCA club.

Capped nine times for the Wallabies, White debuted on the 1931 tour of New Zealand. He played his early Tests in the back row, before being used as a makeshift prop on the 1933 tour of South Africa for all five Springboks matches.

White served with the Royal Australian Air Force in World War II.

== See also ==
- List of Australia national rugby union players
