= Bill Warlow =

- Full name: William John Warlow
- Born: 10 March 1908 Moore, QLD, Australia
- Died: 4 August 1996 (aged 88)
- Height: 5 ft 9 in (175 cm)
- Weight: 159 lb (72 kg)

Rugby union career
- Position: Three-quarter
Provincial / State sides
Years	Team	Apps	(Points)
- Queensland
International career
Years	Team	Apps	(Points)
1933	Australia		

William John Warlow (10 March 1908 – 4 August 1996) was an Australian international rugby union player.

A pacy three-quarter with a good defence, Warlow was a rugby league convert and played for Brisbane club Valleys, from where he made his Queensland representative debut in 1932.

Warlow was preferred over Cyril Towers for a place on the 1933 Wallabies squad which toured South Africa. Wallabies captain Alex Ross, a New South Welshman, reportedly didn't rate Warlow and he played little part in the tour, with his appearances limited to four minor matches. He went on to coach Valleys.

== See also ==
- List of Australia national rugby union players
