= Francis McPhillips =

Australia international rugby union player

- Full name: Francis Gabriel McPhillips
- Born: 10 November 1912 Wagga Wagga, NSW, Australia
- Died: 18 October 1979 (aged 66) Canberra, ACT, Australia
- Height: 5 ft 11 in (180 cm)
- Weight: 161 lb (73 kg)
- School: St Patrick's College

Rugby union career
- Position: Fullback / Three–quarter
Provincial / State sides
| Years | Team | Apps | (Points) |
- New South Wales
International career
| Years | Team | Apps | (Points) |
| 1933 | Australia | | |

Francis Gabriel McPhillips (10 November 1912 – 18 October 1979) was an Australian international rugby union player.

McPhillips was born in Wagga Wagga and picked up rugby union during his time at St Patrick's College, Goulburn. He spent his entire career with Drummoyne, having moved to Sydney for work with the Commonwealth Bank.

A versatile back, McPhillips made his representative debut for New South Wales in 1932, as their fullback against the touring All Blacks in Sydney. His performance was good enough to earn him a place on the following year's Wallabies tour of South Africa as a reserve fullback, backing up captain Alex Ross. He would however be utilised primarily as a three–quarter and finished the tour with eight uncapped appearances, from which he contributed ten points.

McPhillips later settled in Canberra and suffered from leukemia for several years until his death in 1979.

== See also ==
- List of Australia national rugby union players
