= Scott Staniforth =

Australia international rugby union player

- Born: Scott Nicholas Gelling Staniforth; 12 December 1977 (age 48) West Wyalong, New South Wales, Australia
- Height: 188 cm (6 ft 2 in)
- Weight: 100 kg (15 st 10 lb; 220 lb)
- School: All Saints College
- Notable relative(s): Tony Gelling (uncle); Nigel Staniforth (brother); Graydon Staniforth (brother)
- Occupation(s): Professional rugby union footballer

Rugby union career
- Position(s): Wing; Inside Center; Outside Center; Fullback
- Current team: Associates, Western Australia
Senior career
Years	Team	Apps	(Points)
??	Eastwood	??	(??)
2005–06	London Irish	24	(35)
2009–10	Yokogawa Musashino Atlastars	??	(??)
- Correct as of 20 January 2007
Super Rugby
Years	Team	Apps	(Points)
1997–2004	NSW Waratahs	63	(115)
2006–2010	Western Force	43	(55)
- Correct as of 9 June 2007
International career
Years	Team	Apps	(Points)
1999-2008	Australia	12	(35)
1995	Australian Schoolboys		
- Correct as of 20 January 2007

Scott Nicholas Gelling Staniforth (born 12 December 1977 in West Wyalong) is an Australian former rugby union footballer who represented Australia at two Rugby World Cups, the successful 1999 campaign and again in 2007.

== Career ==
Returning to Australia after two years with London Irish, Scott Staniforth was the last player to sign with the Western Force and has played in every match bar one for the new team. Running on predominantly at inside centre, Staniforth can also play on the wing and at fullback and scored nine tries for the Force this season. Born in the NSW country town of West Wyalong, Staniforth went to All Saints College in Bathurst where he represented the Australian Schoolboys before moving to Sydney to further his rugby career. He is also the nephew of 1972 Wallaby backrower Tony Gelling.

1997 – Made his NSW debut against Border Reivers and also represented the Australian Under 21s.

1998 – Made his Super 12 debut against the Stormers in Cape Town and toured France and England with the Wallabies.

1999 – Staniforth was announced as one of the young players in the 30-man World Cup Squad. Scored two tries in his Test debut against the USA at the World Cup in Limerick.

2000–01 – Represented Australia A against the Lions in Gosford and also the Wallabies against the Barbarians in Cardiff.

2002– Scored a record nine tries for the Waratahs and while injury denied him a place in the Test squad at the start of the season, he returned to form with Eastwood winning the Sydney premiership and was selected on the Spring Tour where he played against Ireland and Italy.

2003–04 – Was a consistent performer for the Waratahs on the wing and in the centres before signing with London Irish.

2005 – Played a total of 24 games with London Irish, scoring seven tries and earning the club's Player of the Season award.

2006 – Was the top try scorer for the Western Force with nine and was awarded player of the year for the Western Force. Staniforth came runner up in the Australian Super 14 player of the year. Scott was awarded for his good form being named in the 2006 Qantas Wallabies.

2007– Was a rewarding year for Staniforth being named Vice Captain of the Western Force and his selection for the Wallabies. Staniforth earned a few caps and got the memorable try against the All Blacks in one of the Bledisloe Matches and was hit by injury in his first touch at the France World Cup.

2008– Had another good year with the Emirates Western Force but was hit by injury late in the season and again on the UK end of season Development tour.

2009– Was another rewarding year for Staniforth. Hit early in the season by injury he was unsure if he would reach his 100th Super Rugby cap. The last game of the season, a home game for the Western Force saw Staniforth reach his 100th milestone and finish his Super Rugby career in Australia with 2 tries and a Force win.

2009/10- Staniforth is now playing for Yokogawa Musashino Atlastars in Japan. Yokogawa Musashino Atlastars is a Japanese rugby team based in Musashino, Tokyo.

2010– Staniforth is back at the Emirates Western Force on an injury replacement short term contract for four games, which later got extended to a full contract for the rest of the season

2011– Staniforth was due to play another year with the Emirates Western Force, but due to a neck injury sustained during the 2010 season which he then again hurt playing club rugby in the local Western Australian competition forced him to retire at the end of 2010.

== Honours ==
- 1995 Australian Schoolboys,
- 1996 Australian Under 19s,
- 1997 Australian Under 21s,
- 2001–02 Australia A,
- 1999–2002 Australian Wallabies.
- 2006 Australian Wallabies and Australia A
- 2007 Australian Wallabies

== Senior Tours ==
- 1998 France & England,
- 1999 World Cup (UK),
- 2001 UK & Europe,
- 2002 Argentina, UK & Europe,
- 2006 Wallabies Tour,
- 2007 World Cup (France).
