= Eden Love =

- Born: Eden William Love; 14 October 1909 Burwood, New South Wales
- Died: 22 August 1991 (aged 81)
- School: Newington College
- University: University of Sydney
- Occupation: Veterinarian

Rugby union career
- Position: Prop
Provincial / State sides
Years	Team	Apps	(Points)
- NSW
International career
Years	Team	Apps	(Points)
1932	Australia	3	

Eden William Love (14 October 1909 – 22 August 1991) was an Australian Rugby Union player and veterinarian who practised in Launceston, Tasmania.

== Early life ==
Love was born in Burwood, New South Wales and attended Newington College (1921–1927). He graduated from the University of Sydney in Veterinary Science in 1935.

== Rugby career ==
As a prop, Love played for the Australia national rugby union team in three test matches, making his debut in the Australia v New Zealand at Sydney on 2 July 1932.

== War service ==
During World War II, Love served as a Lieutenant in the Australian Army and as a member of C Company, 2/3 Machine Gun Battalion, was taken as a prisoner of war during the Japanese occupation of the Dutch East Indies in Java.
