= John Ritter (rugby union) =

- Full name: Walter John Ritter
- Born: 18 August 1903 Mount Tyson, QLD, Australia
- Died: 10 January 1974 (aged 70)

Rugby union career
- Position: Front-row forward
Provincial / State sides
Years	Team	Apps	(Points)
- Queensland
International career
Years	Team	Apps	(Points)
1931–33	Australia		

Walter John Ritter (18 August 1903 – 10 January 1974) was an Australian international rugby union player.

Ritter was born and raised in the town of Mount Tyson in Queensland's Darling Downs region.

A front-row forward, Ritter was coined the "Iron Man" by press in Sydney, on account of his toughness. He played his rugby in Toowoomba for the Valleys club and twice toured with the Wallabies without getting capped. In 1931, Ritter made a single tour appearance in New Zealand, as a hooker against Southland. He also took part in their 1933 tour of South Africa and featured in five uncapped matches, with his lack of size counting again him when it came to team selection.

Ritter has an oval in Dalby, Queensland, named after him.

== See also ==
- List of Australia national rugby union players
