= Eddie Bonis =

Australian rugby union player (1907–1984)

- Full name: Edward Tasman Bonis
- Born: 1 October 1907 Brisbane, Australia
- Died: 23 September 1984 (aged 76) Brisbane, Australia

Rugby union career
- Position: Hooker
International career
Years	Team	Apps	(Points)
1929–38	Australia	21	(3)

Edward Tasman Bonis (1 October 1907 — 23 September 1984) was an Australian rugby union international.

A native of Brisbane, Bonis learnt his rugby union at Brisbane State High School.

Bonis was a powerful hooker and played for the YMCA club in Brisbane. He gained 21 Wallabies caps between 1929 and 1938, which included a run of 20 consecutive matches, a then national record. His performances on the 1933 tour of South Africa earned him particular praise. He also made 47 appearances for Queensland and later served as a state selector.

In 2018, Bonis was inducted into the Rugby Australia Hall of Fame.

== See also ==
- List of Australia national rugby union players
