= Ron Biilmann =

Australian rugby union player (1908–1963)

- Born: Ronald Regnor Biilmann; 16 May 1908 Berridale, New South Wales, Australia
- Died: 16 May 1963 (aged 55) Queensland

Rugby union career
- Position: fly-half
International career
Years	Team	Apps	(Points)
1933	Wallabies	4	(12)

Ronald Regnor Biilmann (16 May 1908 – 16 May 1963) was a rugby union player who represented Australia.

Biilmann, a fly-half, was born in Berridale, New South Wales and claimed a total of 4 international rugby caps for Australia.
