= List of Australia national rugby union players =

This is a list of people who have played for the Australia national rugby union team.

Note that the "position" column lists the position at which the player made his test debut, not necessarily the position for which he is best known. A position in parentheses indicates that the player debuted as a substitute.

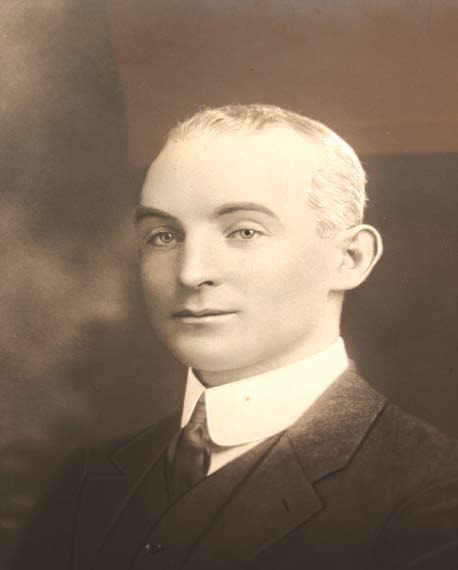
Edward Larkin #38

Pat Walsh #51

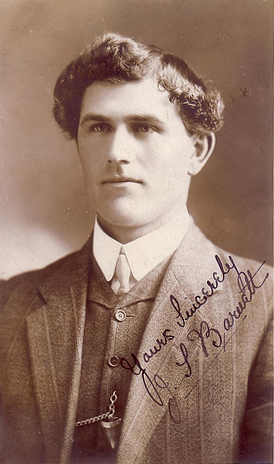
Jack Barnett #73

Peter Burge #74

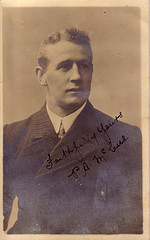
Patrick McCue #79

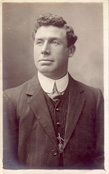
Chris McKivat #80

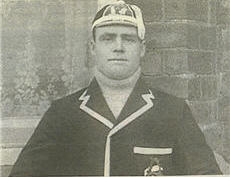
Boxer Russell #83

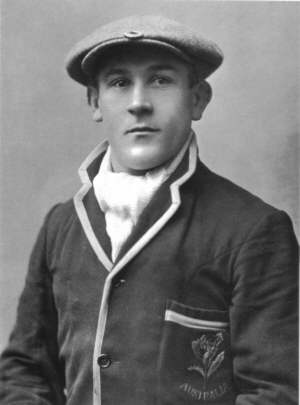
Fred Wood #85

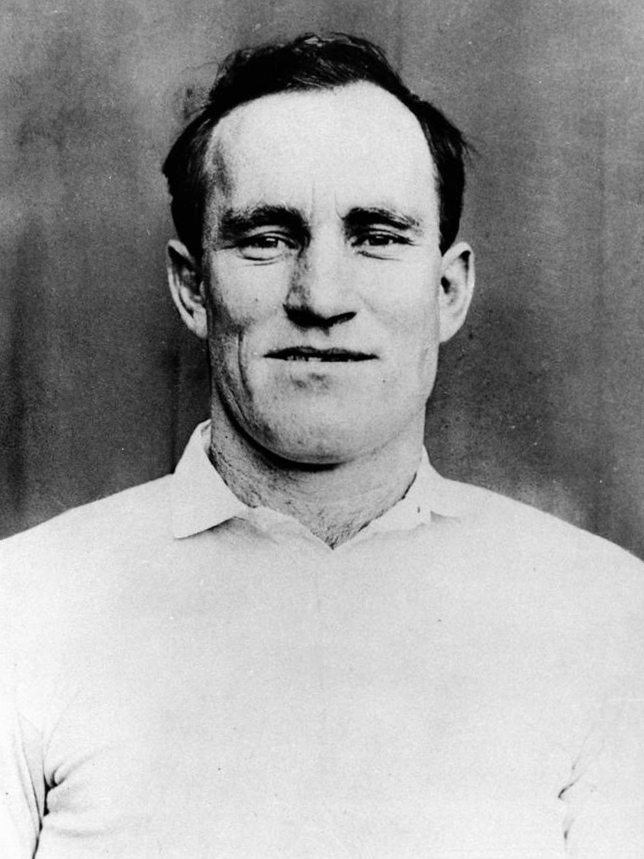
Dally Messenger #90

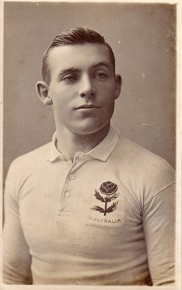
Daniel Carroll #93

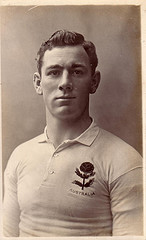
Bob Craig #94

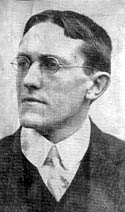
Herbert Moran #97

Tom Richards #99

Ken Gavin #100

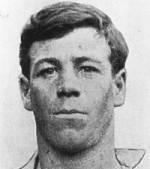
Herb Gilbert #109

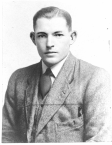
Tom Lawton Snr #154

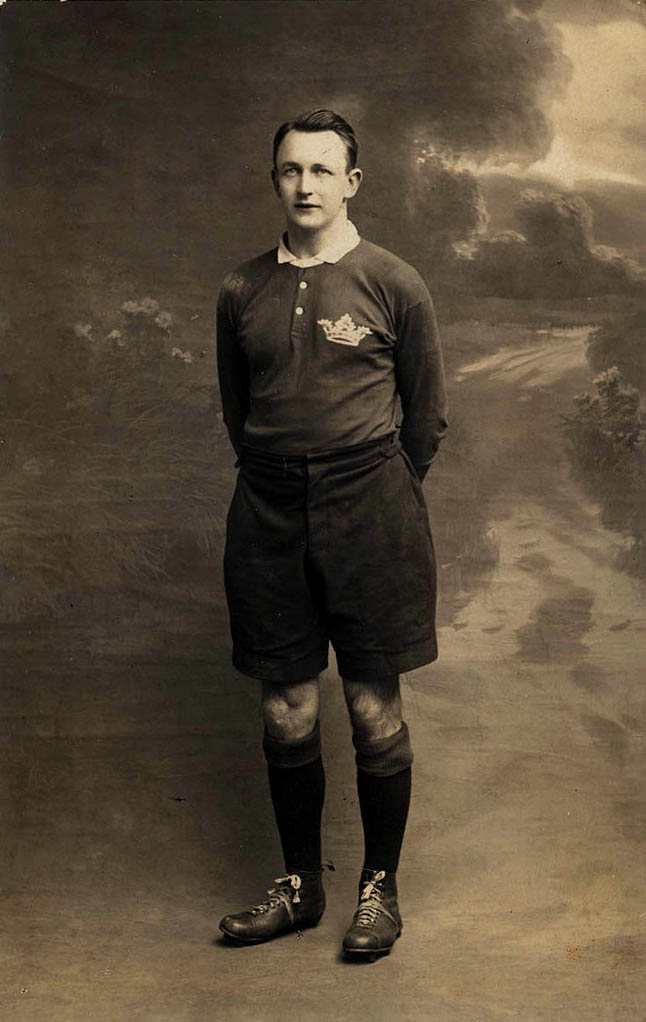
Johnnie Wallace #176

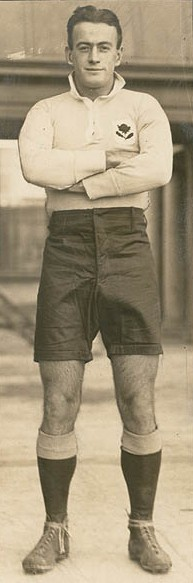
Cyril Towers #230

Syd Malcolm No. 230 & Tom Perrin #273

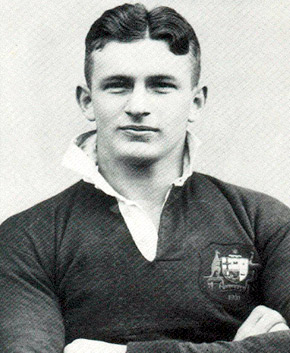
Dave Cowper #277

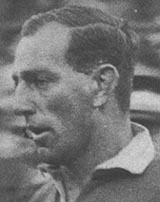
Bill McLean #332

Nick Shehadie #352

== Australia's international rugby capped players ==
This list only includes players who have played in a Test match.

Number	Name	Position	Date first cap obtained	Opposition
1	Patrick Carew	lock	24 June 1899	v Great Britain at Sydney
2	James Carson	prop	24 June 1899	v Great Britain at Sydney
3	Ginger Colton	no. 8	24 June 1899	v Great Britain at Sydney
4	Walter Davis	prop	24 June 1899	v Great Britain at Sydney
5	Charlie Ellis	flanker	24 June 1899	v Great Britain at Sydney
6	William Evans	wing	24 June 1899	v Great Britain at Sydney
7	Austin Gralton	scrum-half	24 June 1899	v Great Britain at Sydney
8	Alex Kelly	flanker	24 June 1899	v Great Britain at Sydney
9	Bob McCowan	fullback	24 June 1899	v Great Britain at Sydney
10	Hyram Marks	lock	24 June 1899	v Great Britain at Sydney
11	Frank Row	centre	24 June 1899	v Great Britain at Sydney
12	Lonnie Spragg	centre	24 June 1899	v Great Britain at Sydney
13	Dooee Tanner	hooker	24 June 1899	v Great Britain at Sydney
14	Peter Ward	fly-half	24 June 1899	v Great Britain at Sydney
15	Charlie White	wing	24 June 1899	v Great Britain at Sydney
16	Robert Challoner	no. 8	22 July 1899	v Great Britain at Brisbane
17	Arthur Corfe	flanker	22 July 1899	v Great Britain at Brisbane
18	Ernest Currie	scrum-half	22 July 1899	v Great Britain at Brisbane
19	Charles Graham	hooker	22 July 1899	v Great Britain at Brisbane
20	Alec Henry	centre	22 July 1899	v Great Britain at Brisbane
21	Norm Street	flanker	22 July 1899	v Great Britain at Brisbane
22	Thomas Ward	wing	22 July 1899	v Great Britain at Brisbane
23	Roger Barton	flanker	5 August 1899	v Great Britain at Sydney
24	Sine Boland	flanker	5 August 1899	v Great Britain at Sydney
25	George Bouffler	hooker	5 August 1899	v Great Britain at Sydney
26	Arch Boyd	scrum-half	5 August 1899	v Great Britain at Sydney
27	Wally Cobb	fullback	5 August 1899	v Great Britain at Sydney
28	Syd Miller	wing	5 August 1899	v Great Britain at Sydney
29	Iggy O'Donnell	fly-half	5 August 1899	v Great Britain at Sydney
30	Bill Webb	prop	5 August 1899	v Great Britain at Sydney
31	Bill Hardcastle	flanker	12 August 1899	v Great Britain at Sydney
32	Jack O'Donnell	hooker	12 August 1899	v Great Britain at Sydney
33	Jum Sampson	no. 8	12 August 1899	v Great Britain at Sydney
34	Alex Burdon	prop	15 August 1903	v New Zealand at Sydney
35	Lew Evans	fly-half	15 August 1903	v New Zealand at Sydney
36	James Joyce	lock	15 August 1903	v New Zealand at Sydney
37	Harold Judd	flanker	15 August 1903	v New Zealand at Sydney
38	Edward Larkin	hooker	15 August 1903	v New Zealand at Sydney
39	Denis Lutge	lock	15 August 1903	v New Zealand at Sydney
40	John Maund	fullback	15 August 1903	v New Zealand at Sydney
41	Frank Nicholson	prop	15 August 1903	v New Zealand at Sydney
42	Charlie Redwood	wing	15 August 1903	v New Zealand at Sydney
43	Sid Riley	centre	15 August 1903	v New Zealand at Sydney
44	Stan Wickham	centre	15 August 1903	v New Zealand at Sydney
45	Snowy Baker	scrum-half	2 July 1904	v Great Britain at Sydney
46	Puddin Colton	flanker	2 July 1904	v Great Britain at Sydney
47	Edmund Dore	hooker	2 July 1904	v Great Britain at Sydney
48	Jack Hindmarsh	centre	2 July 1904	v Great Britain at Sydney
49	Billy Richards	lock	2 July 1904	v Great Britain at Sydney
50	Jack Verge	fullback	2 July 1904	v Great Britain at Sydney
51	Pat Walsh	no. 8	2 July 1904	v Great Britain at Sydney
52	Phil Carmichael	centre	23 July 1904	v Great Britain at Brisbane
53	Alex McKinnon	lock	23 July 1904	v Great Britain at Brisbane
54	Doug McLean Sr.	centre	23 July 1904	v Great Britain at Brisbane
55	John Manning	fly-half	23 July 1904	v Great Britain at Brisbane
56	Voy Oxenham	prop	23 July 1904	v Great Britain at Brisbane
57	Allen Oxlade	hooker	23 July 1904	v Great Britain at Brisbane
58	Blue Dixon	lock	30 July 1904	v Great Britain at Sydney
59	Francis Finley	scrum-half	30 July 1904	v Great Britain at Sydney
60	Frank Futter	centre	30 July 1904	v Great Britain at Sydney
61	Jack Meibusch	prop	30 July 1904	v Great Britain at Sydney
62	Fred Nicholson	wing	30 July 1904	v Great Britain at Sydney
63	Jim White	flanker	30 July 1904	v Great Britain at Sydney
64	Arthur Anlezark	fly-half	2 September 1905	v New Zealand at Dunedin
65	Jimmy Clarken	prop	2 September 1905	v New Zealand at Dunedin
66	Micky Dore	scrum-half	2 September 1905	v New Zealand at Dunedin
67	Bill Hirschberg	flanker	2 September 1905	v New Zealand at Dunedin
68	Basil Lucas	flanker	2 September 1905	v New Zealand at Dunedin
69	Arthur Penman	fullback	2 September 1905	v New Zealand at Dunedin
70	Francis Bede Smith	centre	2 September 1905	v New Zealand at Dunedin
71	Lancelot Smith	centre	2 September 1905	v New Zealand at Dunedin
72	Blair Swannell	no. 8	2 September 1905	v New Zealand at Dunedin
73	Jack Barnett	prop	20 July 1907	v New Zealand at Sydney
74	Peter Burge	lock	20 July 1907	v New Zealand at Sydney
75	Bill Dix	centre	20 July 1907	v New Zealand at Sydney
76	Peter Flanagan	flanker	20 July 1907	v New Zealand at Sydney
77	Tom Griffin	hooker	20 July 1907	v New Zealand at Sydney
78	James Hughes	flanker	20 July 1907	v New Zealand at Sydney
79	Patrick McCue	lock	20 July 1907	v New Zealand at Sydney
80	Chris McKivat	fly-half	20 July 1907	v New Zealand at Sydney
81	John Rosewell	prop	20 July 1907	v New Zealand at Sydney
82	Norm Row	no. 8	20 July 1907	v New Zealand at Sydney
83	Charles Russell	wing	20 July 1907	v New Zealand at Sydney
84	George Watson	wing	20 July 1907	v New Zealand at Sydney
85	Fred Wood	scrum-half	20 July 1907	v New Zealand at Sydney
86	Bob Graves	(prop)	20 July 1907	v New Zealand at Sydney
87	William Canniffe	lock	3 August 1907	v New Zealand at Brisbane
88	John Fihelly	flanker	3 August 1907	v New Zealand at Brisbane
89	Edward Mandible	fly-half	3 August 1907	v New Zealand at Brisbane
90	Dally Messenger	wing	3 August 1907	v New Zealand at Brisbane
91	Esmond Parkinson	wing	3 August 1907	v New Zealand at Brisbane
92	Albert Burge	flanker	10 August 1907	v New Zealand at Sydney
93	Danny Carroll	wing	12 December 1908	v Wales at Cardiff
94	Bob Craig	hooker	12 December 1908	v Wales at Cardiff
95	Charles Hammand	lock	12 December 1908	v Wales at Cardiff
96	Jack Hickey	centre	12 December 1908	v Wales at Cardiff
97	Herbert Moran	flanker	12 December 1908	v Wales at Cardiff
98	Ward Prentice	fly-half	12 December 1908	v Wales at Cardiff
99	Tom Richards	no. 8	12 December 1908	v Wales at Cardiff
100	Ken Gavin	prop	9 January 1909	v England at Blackheath
101	Malcolm McArthur	flanker	9 January 1909	v England at Blackheath
102	Arthur McCabe	fly-half	9 January 1909	v England at Blackheath
103	Sydney Middleton	flanker	9 January 1909	v England at Blackheath
104	John Campbell	centre	25 June 1910	v New Zealand at Sydney
105	Alf Dunbar	wing	25 June 1910	v New Zealand at Sydney
106	Larry Dwyer	fullback	25 June 1910	v New Zealand at Sydney
107	Brickey Farmer	flanker	25 June 1910	v New Zealand at Sydney
108	Harold George	prop	25 June 1910	v New Zealand at Sydney
109	Herb Gilbert	wing	25 June 1910	v New Zealand at Sydney
110	Charlie Hodgins	fly-half	25 June 1910	v New Zealand at Sydney
111	Pat Murphy	lock	25 June 1910	v New Zealand at Sydney
112	Frederick Timbury	lock	25 June 1910	v New Zealand at Sydney
113	Bob Stuart	flanker	27 June 1910	v New Zealand at Sydney
114	Leo Reynolds	(lock)	27 June 1910	v New Zealand at Sydney
115	Stephen Slater	prop	2 July 1910	v New Zealand at Sydney
116	Bob Adamson	wing	16 November 1912	v United States at Berkeley
117	Ted Fahey	lock	16 November 1912	v United States at Berkeley
118	Copper Kent	flanker	16 November 1912	v United States at Berkeley
119	Lou Meibusch	wing	16 November 1912	v United States at Berkeley
120	William Murphy	no. 8	16 November 1912	v United States at Berkeley
121	George Pugh	lock	16 November 1912	v United States at Berkeley
122	Alfred Walker	scrum-half	16 November 1912	v United States at Berkeley
123	Bill Watson	prop	16 November 1912	v United States at Berkeley
124	Ernie Carr	wing	6 September 1913	v New Zealand at Wellington
125	Bill Cody	flanker	6 September 1913	v New Zealand at Wellington
126	Hubert Jones	centre	6 September 1913	v New Zealand at Wellington
127	Michael McMahon	fullback	6 September 1913	v New Zealand at Wellington
128	Claud O'Donnell	hooker	6 September 1913	v New Zealand at Wellington
129	Dudley Suttor	wing	6 September 1913	v New Zealand at Wellington
130	Bill Tasker	fly-half	6 September 1913	v New Zealand at Wellington
131	Fred Thompson	no. 8	6 September 1913	v New Zealand at Wellington
132	Clarrie Wallach	lock	6 September 1913	v New Zealand at Wellington
133	Larry Wogan	centre	6 September 1913	v New Zealand at Wellington
134	David Horadam	prop	13 September 1913	v New Zealand at Dunedin
135	Bryan Hughes	flanker	13 September 1913	v New Zealand at Dunedin
136	Richard Simpson	fullback	13 September 1913	v New Zealand at Dunedin
137	David Williams	prop	20 September 1913	v New Zealand at Christchurch
138	Harald Baker	flanker	18 July 1914	v New Zealand at Sydney
139	Jimmy Flynn	centre	18 July 1914	v New Zealand at Sydney
140	Eric Francis	wing	18 July 1914	v New Zealand at Sydney
141	John Thompson	flanker	18 July 1914	v New Zealand at Sydney
142	Clinker Birt	no. 8	1 August 1914	v New Zealand at Brisbane
143	Samuel Kreutzer	prop	1 August 1914	v New Zealand at Brisbane
144	William Morrissey	prop	1 August 1914	v New Zealand at Brisbane
145	Jackie Beith	fullback	15 August 1914	v New Zealand at Sydney
146	Montagu Massy-Westropp	wing	15 August 1914	v New Zealand at Sydney
147	Clarrie Prentice	prop	15 August 1914	v New Zealand at Sydney
148	John Bond	flanker	24 July 1920	v New Zealand XV at Sydney
149	Roy Chambers	centre	24 July 1920	v New Zealand XV at Sydney
150	Tom Davis	no. 8	24 July 1920	v New Zealand XV at Sydney
151	Viv Dunn	prop	24 July 1920	v New Zealand XV at Sydney
152	Ray Elliott	lock	24 July 1920	v New Zealand XV at Sydney
153	Charlie Fox	flanker	24 July 1920	v New Zealand XV at Sydney
154	Tom Lawton Snr	fly-half	24 July 1920	v New Zealand XV at Sydney
155	Robert Marrott	hooker	24 July 1920	v New Zealand XV at Sydney
156	Arthur Mayne	wing	24 July 1920	v New Zealand XV at Sydney
157	Irving Ormiston	lock	24 July 1920	v New Zealand XV at Sydney
158	Roland Raymond	wing	24 July 1920	v New Zealand XV at Sydney
159	Clive Farquhar	centre	31 July 1920	v New Zealand XV at Sydney
160	George McKay	flanker	31 July 1920	v New Zealand XV at Sydney
161	Geoffrey Wyld	lock	31 July 1920	v New Zealand XV at Sydney
162	Watty Friend	lock	7 August 1920	v New Zealand XV at Sydney
163	Onslow Humphreys	fly-half	7 August 1920	v New Zealand XV at Sydney
164	Norm Mingay	scrum-half	7 August 1920	v New Zealand XV at Sydney
165	Jackie Shute	wing	7 August 1920	v New Zealand XV at Sydney
166	Slip Carr	wing	25 June 1921	v South Africa XV at Sydney
167	Duncan Fowles	prop	25 June 1921	v South Africa XV at Sydney
168	John Holdsworth	lock	25 June 1921	v South Africa XV at Sydney
169	Reg Lane	wing	25 June 1921	v South Africa XV at Sydney
170	Otto Nothling	fullback	25 June 1921	v South Africa XV at Sydney
171	Billy Sheehan	centre	25 June 1921	v South Africa XV at Sydney
172	Tom Smith	prop	25 June 1921	v South Africa XV at Sydney
173	Joe Thorn	flanker	25 June 1921	v South Africa XV at Sydney
174	Darby Loudon	flanker	3 September 1921	v New Zealand XV at Christchurch
175	Bot Stanley	centre	3 September 1921	v New Zealand XV at Christchurch
176	Johnnie Wallace	wing	3 September 1921	v New Zealand XV at Christchurch
177	Jock Blackwood	hooker	24 June 1922	v New Zealand Maori at Sydney
178	John Taylor	centre	24 June 1922	v New Zealand Maori at Sydney
179	Charlie Thompson	prop	24 June 1922	v New Zealand Maori at Sydney
180	Roy Cooney	centre	26 June 1922	v New Zealand Maori at Sydney
181	Reg Ferguson	lock	8 July 1922	v New Zealand Maori at Sydney
182	Henry Pigott	(flanker)	8 July 1922	v New Zealand Maori at Sydney
183	Jack Bonner	lock	29 July 1922	v New Zealand XV at Sydney
184	Larry Newman	wing	29 July 1922	v New Zealand XV at Sydney
185	Ted Thorn	flanker	29 July 1922	v New Zealand XV at Sydney
186	Bill Marrott	no. 8	5 August 1922	v New Zealand XV at Sydney
187	Norm Smith	wing	5 August 1922	v New Zealand XV at Sydney
188	Bill Douglas	(lock)	7 August 1922	v New Zealand XV at Sydney
189	Arthur Erby	prop	16 June 1923	v New Zealand Maori at Sydney
190	Gregor George	fly-half	16 June 1923	v New Zealand Maori at Sydney
191	John Pym	wing	16 June 1923	v New Zealand Maori at Sydney
192	Harry Tancred	no. 8	16 June 1923	v New Zealand Maori at Sydney
193	Owen Crossman	(wing)	16 June 1923	v New Zealand Maori at Sydney
194	Allen Bowers	(wing)	23 June 1923	v New Zealand Maori at Sydney
195	Peter Buchanan	centre	25 June 1923	v New Zealand Maori at Sydney
196	Ted Greatorex	flanker	25 June 1923	v New Zealand Maori at Sydney
197	Alexander Armstrong	no. 8	25 August 1923	v New Zealand XV at Dunedin
198	Danie Erasmus	wing	25 August 1923	v New Zealand XV at Dunedin
199	Hugh Taylor	lock	25 August 1923	v New Zealand XV at Dunedin
200	Bob Loudon	(flanker)	25 August 1923	v New Zealand XV at Dunedin
201	John Crakanthorp	fullback	15 September 1923	v New Zealand XV at Wellington
202	Wally Meagher	scrum-half	15 September 1923	v New Zealand XV at Wellington
203	Roy Hoskins	no. 8	5 July 1924	v New Zealand XV at Sydney
204	Ernie Ritchie	prop	5 July 1924	v New Zealand XV at Sydney
205	Hugh Buntine	centre	12 July 1924	v New Zealand XV at Sydney
206	Reg Foote	wing	12 July 1924	v New Zealand XV at Sydney
207	Arthur Toby	centre	16 July 1924	v New Zealand XV at Sydney
208	Robert Anderson	centre	13 June 1925	v New Zealand XV at Sydney
209	Harry Bryant	no. 8	13 June 1925	v New Zealand XV at Sydney
210	John Hill	prop	13 June 1925	v New Zealand XV at Sydney
211	Alf Rainbow	fly-half	13 June 1925	v New Zealand XV at Sydney
212	Alex Ross	fullback	13 June 1925	v New Zealand XV at Sydney
213	Patrick Mulligan	(centre)	13 June 1925	v New Zealand XV at Sydney
214	Clive Bondfield	wing	20 June 1925	v New Zealand XV at Sydney
215	Bill Laycock	no. 8	20 June 1925	v New Zealand XV at Sydney
216	Charles Morrissey	centre	20 June 1925	v New Zealand XV at Sydney
217	Ernie Reid	centre	20 June 1925	v New Zealand XV at Sydney
218	Wal Rigney	flanker	20 June 1925	v New Zealand XV at Sydney
219	Colin Shaw	lock	20 June 1925	v New Zealand XV at Sydney
220	Harold Snell	scrum-half	20 June 1925	v New Zealand XV at Sydney
221	Ken Tarleton	hooker	20 June 1925	v New Zealand XV at Sydney
222	Wylie Breckenridge	(flanker)	20 June 1925	v New Zealand XV at Sydney
223	Arthur Jamieson	(wing)	23 June 1925	v New Zealand XV at Sydney
224	Jack Ford	no. 8	19 September 1925	v New Zealand XV at Auckland
225	Bruce Judd	lock	19 September 1925	v New Zealand XV at Auckland
226	Harry Woods	prop	19 September 1925	v New Zealand XV at Auckland
227	Arthur Finlay	lock	10 July 1926	v New Zealand XV at Sydney
228	Wal Ives	lock	10 July 1926	v New Zealand XV at Sydney
229	Syd King	centre	10 July 1926	v New Zealand XV at Sydney
230	Cyril Towers	centre	10 July 1926	v New Zealand XV at Sydney
231	Jim Tancred	no. 8	20 July 1926	v New Zealand XV at Sydney
232	Don Telford	(lock)	20 July 1926	v New Zealand XV at Sydney
233	Ray Bowden	lock	29 July 1926	v New Zealand XV at Sydney
234	Ian Comrie-Thomson	hooker	29 July 1926	v New Zealand XV at Sydney
235	Jack Duncan	scrum-half	29 July 1926	v New Zealand XV at Sydney
236	George Mackay	fullback	29 July 1926	v New Zealand XV at Sydney
237	Stuart McLaren	wing	29 July 1926	v New Zealand XV at Sydney
238	Geoff Storey	lock	29 July 1926	v New Zealand XV at Sydney
239	Merv Rylance	(wing)	29 July 1926	v New Zealand XV at Sydney
240	Eric Ford	wing	12 November 1927	v Ireland at Lansdowne Road
241	Arnold Tancred	flanker	12 November 1927	v Ireland at Lansdowne Road
242	Syd Malcolm	scrum-half	17 December 1927	v Scotland at Murrayfield
243	Malcolm Blair	prop	22 January 1928	v France at Colombes
244	Eric Bardsley	flanker	5 September 1928	v New Zealand XV at Wellington
245	Robert Burge	centre	5 September 1928	v New Zealand XV at Wellington
246	Bill Cerutti	prop	5 September 1928	v New Zealand XV at Wellington
247	John Lamb	lock	5 September 1928	v New Zealand XV at Wellington
248	Jack O'Connor	lock	5 September 1928	v New Zealand XV at Wellington
249	John O'Donnell	prop	5 September 1928	v New Zealand XV at Wellington
250	Myer Rosenblum	flanker	5 September 1928	v New Zealand XV at Wellington
251	Alf Smairl	wing	5 September 1928	v New Zealand XV at Wellington
252	Bob Westfield	fullback	5 September 1928	v New Zealand XV at Wellington
253	Bill White	wing	5 September 1928	v New Zealand XV at Wellington
254	Bill Hemingway	wing	8 September 1928	v New Zealand XV at Dunedin
255	Allen Munsie	flanker	8 September 1928	v New Zealand XV at Dunedin
256	Walter Phipps	hooker	8 September 1928	v New Zealand XV at Dunedin
257	Geoff Bland	lock	15 September 1928	v New Zealand XV at Christchurch
258	Bruce Caldwell	centre	15 September 1928	v New Zealand XV at Christchurch
259	Donald Bull	centre	22 September 1928	v New Zealand Maori at Wellington
260	Bernard Croft	wing	22 September 1928	v New Zealand Maori at Wellington
261	Edward Bonis	hooker	6 July 1929	v New Zealand at Sydney
262	Cam Gordon	wing	6 July 1929	v New Zealand at Sydney
263	Harry Hamalainen	lock	6 July 1929	v New Zealand at Sydney
264	Len Palfreyman	no. 8	6 July 1929	v New Zealand at Sydney
265	Eddie Thompson	prop	6 July 1929	v New Zealand at Sydney
266	Alan Thorpe	(centre)	6 July 1929	v New Zealand at Sydney
267	Gordon McGhie	wing	20 July 1929	v New Zealand at Brisbane
268	Gordon Sturtridge	centre	20 July 1929	v New Zealand at Brisbane
269	Walter Bennett	scrum-half	9 September 1931	v New Zealand Maori at Palmerston North
270	Owen Bridle	flanker	9 September 1931	v New Zealand Maori at Palmerston North
271	Jimmy Clark	flanker	9 September 1931	v New Zealand Maori at Palmerston North
272	Harold Herd	centre	9 September 1931	v New Zealand Maori at Palmerston North
273	Tom Perrin	no. 8	9 September 1931	v New Zealand Maori at Palmerston North
274	Jack Steggall	fly-half	9 September 1931	v New Zealand Maori at Palmerston North
275	Harold Tolhurst	wing	9 September 1931	v New Zealand Maori at Palmerston North
276	Max White	lock	9 September 1931	v New Zealand Maori at Palmerston North
277	Dave Cowper	centre	12 September 1931	v New Zealand at Auckland
278	Graham Cooke	lock	2 July 1932	v New Zealand at Sydney
279	Eden Love	prop	2 July 1932	v New Zealand at Sydney
280	Weary Dunlop	no. 8	23 July 1932	v New Zealand at Sydney
281	Roy Lindsay	wing	23 July 1932	v New Zealand at Sydney
282	Ron Biilmann	fly-half	8 July 1933	v South Africa at Cape Town
283	Jack Kelaher	wing	8 July 1933	v South Africa at Cape Town
284	Wal Mackney	no. 8	8 July 1933	v South Africa at Cape Town
285	Doug McLean Jr.	wing	8 July 1933	v South Africa at Cape Town
286	Bill White	lock	8 July 1933	v South Africa at Cape Town
287	Aub Hodgson	flanker	22 July 1933	v South Africa at Durban
288	Vince Bermingham	prop	11 August 1934	v New Zealand at Sydney
289	Dooney Hayes	centre	11 August 1934	v New Zealand at Sydney
290	Ted Jessep	prop	11 August 1934	v New Zealand at Sydney
291	Wally Lewis	fly-half	11 August 1934	v New Zealand at Sydney
292	Ron Walden	lock	25 August 1934	v New Zealand at Sydney
293	Mike Gibbons	scrum-half	5 September 1936	v New Zealand at Wellington
294	Frank Hutchinson	lock	5 September 1936	v New Zealand at Wellington
295	Russell Kelly	no. 8	5 September 1936	v New Zealand at Wellington
296	Bill McLaughlin	centre	5 September 1936	v New Zealand at Wellington
297	Jack Malone	prop	5 September 1936	v New Zealand at Wellington
298	Tom Pauling	centre	5 September 1936	v New Zealand at Wellington
299	Ron Rankin	fullback	5 September 1936	v New Zealand at Wellington
300	Vic Richards	fly-half	5 September 1936	v New Zealand at Wellington
301	Keith Storey	fullback	12 September 1936	v New Zealand at Dunedin
302	Roo Dorr	wing	23 September 1936	v New Zealand Maori at Palmerston North
303	Mac Ramsay	flanker	23 September 1936	v New Zealand Maori at Palmerston North
304	Eric Hutchinson	lock	26 June 1937	v South Africa at Sydney
305	Jan McShane	scrum-half	26 June 1937	v South Africa at Sydney
306	Vay Wilson	lock	26 June 1937	v South Africa at Sydney
307	Keith Windon	flanker	26 June 1937	v South Africa at Sydney
308	Paul Collins	fly-half	17 July 1937	v South Africa at Sydney
309	Bill Hammon	centre	17 July 1937	v South Africa at Sydney
310	Frank O'Brien	wing	17 July 1937	v South Africa at Sydney
311	Alby Stone	hooker	17 July 1937	v South Africa at Sydney
312	Max Carpenter	wing	23 July 1938	v New Zealand at Sydney
313	Jack Howard	wing	23 July 1938	v New Zealand at Sydney
314	Frederick Kerr	no. 8	23 July 1938	v New Zealand at Sydney
315	Boyd Oxlade	flanker	23 July 1938	v New Zealand at Sydney
316	Gordon Stone	scrum-half	23 July 1938	v New Zealand at Sydney
317	Winston Ide	centre	6 August 1938	v New Zealand at Brisbane
318	Cliff Lang	prop	6 August 1938	v New Zealand at Brisbane
319	Jack McDonald	flanker	6 August 1938	v New Zealand at Brisbane
320	Bill Monti	lock	6 August 1938	v New Zealand at Brisbane
321	Cecil Ramalli	scrum-half	6 August 1938	v New Zealand at Brisbane
322	Mick Clifford	fullback	13 August 1938	v New Zealand at Sydney
323	Trevor Allan	centre	14 September 1946	v New Zealand at Dunedin
324	Arthur Buchan	no. 8	14 September 1946	v New Zealand at Dunedin
325	Mick Cremin	fly-half	14 September 1946	v New Zealand at Dunedin
326	Wal Dawson	hooker	14 September 1946	v New Zealand at Dunedin
327	Charlie Eastes	wing	14 September 1946	v New Zealand at Dunedin
328	Phil Hardcastle	lock	14 September 1946	v New Zealand at Dunedin
329	Paul Johnson	centre	14 September 1946	v New Zealand at Dunedin
330	Allan Livermore	flanker	14 September 1946	v New Zealand at Dunedin
331	Terry MacBride	wing	14 September 1946	v New Zealand at Dunedin
332	Bill McLean	lock	14 September 1946	v New Zealand at Dunedin
333	Bob McMaster	prop	14 September 1946	v New Zealand at Dunedin
334	Brian Piper	fullback	14 September 1946	v New Zealand at Dunedin
335	Chappie Schulte	scrum-half	14 September 1946	v New Zealand at Dunedin
336	Eric Tweedale	prop	14 September 1946	v New Zealand at Dunedin
337	Colin Windon	flanker	14 September 1946	v New Zealand at Dunedin
338	Ernie Freeman	(prop)	14 September 1946	v New Zealand at Dunedin
339	Max Howell	(centre)	14 September 1946	v New Zealand at Dunedin
340	Des Bannon	fly-half	25 September 1946	v New Zealand Maori at Hamilton
341	Don Furness	hooker	25 September 1946	v New Zealand Maori at Hamilton
342	Bruce Hamilton	lock	25 September 1946	v New Zealand Maori at Hamilton
343	Jim Stone	wing	25 September 1946	v New Zealand Maori at Hamilton
344	Cyril Burke	scrum-half	28 September 1946	v New Zealand at Auckland
345	Roger Cornforth	flanker	14 June 1947	v New Zealand at Brisbane
346	Ken Kearney	hooker	14 June 1947	v New Zealand at Brisbane
347	Doug Keller	prop	14 June 1947	v New Zealand at Brisbane
348	Alan Walker	centre	14 June 1947	v New Zealand at Brisbane
349	Kevin Bourke	centre	28 June 1947	v New Zealand at Sydney
350	Neville Emery	fly-half	28 June 1947	v New Zealand at Sydney
351	Joe Kraefft	lock	28 June 1947	v New Zealand at Sydney
352	Nicholas Shehadie	lock	28 June 1947	v New Zealand at Sydney
353	Clem Windsor	fullback	28 June 1947	v New Zealand at Sydney
354	Eric Davis	prop	22 November 1947	v Scotland at Murrayfield
355	Arthur Tonkin	wing	22 November 1947	v Scotland at Murrayfield
356	Jack Baxter	prop	4 June 1949	v New Zealand Maori at Sydney
357	Jack Blomley	centre	4 June 1949	v New Zealand Maori at Sydney
358	Eddie Broad	fly-half	4 June 1949	v New Zealand Maori at Sydney
359	Roy Cawsey	scrum-half	4 June 1949	v New Zealand Maori at Sydney
360	Nev Cottrell	hooker	4 June 1949	v New Zealand Maori at Sydney
361	Keith Cross	flanker	4 June 1949	v New Zealand Maori at Sydney
362	Patrick Harvey	no. 8	4 June 1949	v New Zealand Maori at Sydney
363	Jack Marshall	wing	4 June 1949	v New Zealand Maori at Sydney
364	David Brockhoff	flanker	11 June 1949	v New Zealand Maori at Brisbane
365	John Fogarty	wing	11 June 1949	v New Zealand Maori at Brisbane
366	John Solomon	wing	25 June 1949	v New Zealand Maori at Sydney
367	Clarrie Davis	wing	3 September 1949	v New Zealand at Wellington
368	Ralph Garner	wing	3 September 1949	v New Zealand at Wellington
369	Rex Mossop	lock	3 September 1949	v New Zealand at Wellington
370	Bevan Wilson	prop	3 September 1949	v New Zealand at Wellington
371	Bill Gardner	fullback	19 August 1950	v British and Irish Lions at Brisbane
372	Keith Gordon	prop	19 August 1950	v British and Irish Lions at Brisbane
373	Ernie Hills	wing	19 August 1950	v British and Irish Lions at Brisbane
374	Fabian McCarthy	prop	19 August 1950	v British and Irish Lions at Brisbane
375	Donald MacMillan	flanker	19 August 1950	v British and Irish Lions at Brisbane
376	Peter Thompson	wing	19 August 1950	v British and Irish Lions at Brisbane
377	Paul Costello	fullback	26 August 1950	v British and Irish Lions at Sydney
378	Alan Cameron	lock	23 June 1951	v New Zealand at Sydney
379	Keith Gudsell	centre	23 June 1951	v New Zealand at Sydney
380	Conrad Primmer	lock	23 June 1951	v New Zealand at Sydney
381	Peter Rothwell	fullback	23 June 1951	v New Zealand at Sydney
382	Eddie Stapleton	wing	23 June 1951	v New Zealand at Sydney
383	Dick Tooth	fly-half	23 June 1951	v New Zealand at Sydney
384	Keith Winning	flanker	23 June 1951	v New Zealand at Sydney
385	Neil Betts	prop	7 July 1951	v New Zealand at Sydney
386	Murray Tate	centre	21 July 1951	v New Zealand at Brisbane
387	Herb Barker	centre	26 July 1952	v Fiji at Sydney
388	Brian Cox	scrum-half	26 July 1952	v Fiji at Sydney
389	Bob Davidson	prop	26 July 1952	v Fiji at Sydney
390	Lon Hatherell	prop	26 July 1952	v Fiji at Sydney
391	Brian Johnson	flanker	26 July 1952	v Fiji at Sydney
392	Garth Jones	wing	26 July 1952	v Fiji at Sydney
393	Tony Miller	no. 8	26 July 1952	v Fiji at Sydney
394	Ray Colbert	fullback	9 August 1952	v Fiji at Sydney
395	John O'Neill	wing	6 September 1952	v New Zealand at Christchurch
396	John Bosler	scrum-half	22 August 1953	v South Africa at Johannesburg
397	Jack Carroll	no. 8	22 August 1953	v South Africa at Johannesburg
398	Mac Hughes	flanker	22 August 1953	v South Africa at Johannesburg
399	Jim Phipps	centre	22 August 1953	v South Africa at Johannesburg
400	Thomas Sweeney	fullback	22 August 1953	v South Africa at Johannesburg
401	Jim Walsh	hooker	22 August 1953	v South Africa at Johannesburg
402	Spencer Brown	fly-half	5 September 1953	v South Africa at Cape Town
403	Colin Forbes	prop	5 September 1953	v South Africa at Cape Town
404	Vince Heinrich	flanker	5 June 1954	v Fiji at Brisbane
405	Paul Mooney	hooker	5 June 1954	v Fiji at Brisbane
406	John Pashley	flanker	5 June 1954	v Fiji at Brisbane
407	Gavan Horsley	wing	26 June 1954	v Fiji at Sydney
408	Neil Adams	prop	20 August 1955	v New Zealand at Wellington
409	Jim Cross	hooker	20 August 1955	v New Zealand at Wellington
410	John Thornett	flanker	20 August 1955	v New Zealand at Wellington
411	Gordon Davis	fly-half	3 September 1955	v New Zealand at Dunedin
412	Rod Phelps	fullback	3 September 1955	v New Zealand at Dunedin
413	Don Strachan	prop	3 September 1955	v New Zealand at Dunedin
414	Jim Brown	hooker	26 May 1956	v South Africa at Sydney
415	Ainslie Sheil	fly-half	26 May 1956	v South Africa at Sydney
416	Saxon White	centre	26 May 1956	v South Africa at Sydney
417	Barry Roberts	wing	2 June 1956	v South Africa at Brisbane
418	Terry Curley	fullback	25 May 1957	v New Zealand at Sydney
419	Ken Donald	wing	25 May 1957	v New Zealand at Sydney
420	Max Elliott	prop	25 May 1957	v New Zealand at Sydney
421	Peter Fenwicke	no. 8	25 May 1957	v New Zealand at Sydney
422	Alan Morton	wing	25 May 1957	v New Zealand at Sydney
423	Jack Potts	centre	25 May 1957	v New Zealand at Sydney
424	Chilla Wilson	flanker	25 May 1957	v New Zealand at Sydney
425	Dave Emanuel	flanker	1 June 1957	v New Zealand at Brisbane
426	Brian Ford	wing	1 June 1957	v New Zealand at Brisbane
427	Bill Gunther	no. 8	1 June 1957	v New Zealand at Brisbane
428	Neill Latimer	lock	1 June 1957	v New Zealand at Brisbane
429	Des Connor	scrum-half	4 January 1958	v Wales at Cardiff
430	Jim Lenehan	centre	4 January 1958	v Wales at Cardiff
431	Arthur Summons	fly-half	4 January 1958	v Wales at Cardiff
432	Kevin Ryan	no. 8	1 February 1958	v England at Twickenham
433	Geoffrey Vaughan	prop	1 February 1958	v England at Twickenham
434	Eddie Purkiss	flanker	15 February 1958	v Scotland at Murrayfield
435	Tony Fox	wing	9 March 1958	v France at Colombes
436	Ron Harvey	fly-half	9 March 1958	v France at Colombes
437	Ken Yanz	flanker	9 March 1958	v France at Colombes
438	Alister Boyd	wing	14 June 1958	v New Zealand Maori at Brisbane
439	Don Logan	scrum-half	14 June 1958	v New Zealand Maori at Brisbane
440	Ronald Meadows	hooker	14 June 1958	v New Zealand Maori at Brisbane
441	Bruce Wells	fly-half	14 June 1958	v New Zealand Maori at Brisbane
442	John Carroll	no. 8	28 June 1958	v New Zealand Maori at Sydney
443	Peter James	centre	28 June 1958	v New Zealand Maori at Sydney
444	Kerry Larkin	prop	28 June 1958	v New Zealand Maori at Sydney
445	Peter Dunn	prop	23 August 1958	v New Zealand at Wellington
446	Keith Ellis	prop	23 August 1958	v New Zealand at Wellington
447	Beres Ellwood	centre	23 August 1958	v New Zealand at Wellington
448	Don Lowth	flanker	23 August 1958	v New Zealand at Wellington
449	Jon White	lock	23 August 1958	v New Zealand at Wellington
450	Danny Kay	centre	6 September 1958	v New Zealand at Christchurch
451	Thomas Baxter	centre	20 September 1958	v New Zealand at Auckland
452	Len Diett	centre	6 June 1959	v British and Irish Lions at Brisbane
453	Peter Johnson	hooker	6 June 1959	v British and Irish Lions at Brisbane
454	Bob Outterside	no. 8	6 June 1959	v British and Irish Lions at Brisbane
455	Ken Catchpole	scrum-half	10 June 1961	v Fiji at Brisbane
456	Mike Cleary	wing	10 June 1961	v Fiji at Brisbane
457	John Dowse	fly-half	10 June 1961	v Fiji at Brisbane
458	Ted Heinrich	flanker	10 June 1961	v Fiji at Brisbane
459	Jimmy Lisle	centre	10 June 1961	v Fiji at Brisbane
460	Graeme Macdougall	lock	10 June 1961	v Fiji at Brisbane
461	Ted Magrath	wing	10 June 1961	v Fiji at Brisbane
462	John O'Gorman	no. 8	10 June 1961	v Fiji at Brisbane
463	Terry Reid	flanker	10 June 1961	v Fiji at Brisbane
464	Harry Roberts	centre	10 June 1961	v Fiji at Brisbane
465	Dick Thornett	lock	10 June 1961	v Fiji at Brisbane
466	Rob Heming	lock	17 June 1961	v Fiji at Sydney
467	Robert Potter	wing	17 June 1961	v Fiji at Sydney
468	Art Turnbull	wing	1 July 1961	v Fiji at Melbourne
469	Stewart Boyce	wing	26 May 1962	v New Zealand at Brisbane
470	Lloyd McDermott	wing	26 May 1962	v New Zealand at Brisbane
471	Jim Miller	lock	26 May 1962	v New Zealand at Brisbane
472	Paul Perrin	lock	26 May 1962	v New Zealand at Brisbane
473	Peter Scott	centre	26 May 1962	v New Zealand at Brisbane
474	Norm Storey	fly-half	26 May 1962	v New Zealand at Brisbane
475	Jim Boyce	centre	25 August 1962	v New Zealand at Wellington
476	Geoff Chapman	flanker	25 August 1962	v New Zealand at Wellington
477	Jim Douglas	wing	25 August 1962	v New Zealand at Wellington
478	John Freedman	prop	25 August 1962	v New Zealand at Wellington
479	Phil Hawthorne	fly-half	25 August 1962	v New Zealand at Wellington
480	Ken McMullen	scrum-half	25 August 1962	v New Zealand at Wellington
481	Keith Walsham	wing	25 August 1962	v New Zealand at Wellington
482	Peter Crittle	flanker	8 September 1962	v New Zealand at Dunedin
483	Dick Marks	centre	8 September 1962	v New Zealand at Dunedin
484	Les Austin	prop	4 June 1963	v England at Sydney
485	Greg Davis	flanker	4 June 1963	v England at Sydney
486	Peter Jones	centre	4 June 1963	v England at Sydney
487	Peter Ryan	fullback	4 June 1963	v England at Sydney
488	John Williams	wing	13 July 1963	v South Africa at Pretoria
489	Terry Casey	fullback	10 August 1963	v South Africa at Cape Town
490	Jules Guerassimoff	flanker	10 August 1963	v South Africa at Cape Town
491	Ian Moutray	centre	10 August 1963	v South Africa at Cape Town
492	Bob Honan	centre	15 August 1964	v New Zealand at Dunedin
493	Dallas O'Neill	no. 8	15 August 1964	v New Zealand at Dunedin
494	David Grimmond	wing	22 August 1964	v New Zealand at Christchurch
495	David Shepherd	no. 8	29 August 1964	v New Zealand at Wellington
496	Alan Cardy	wing	28 May 1966	v British and Irish Lions at Sydney
497	George Ruebner	wing	28 May 1966	v British and Irish Lions at Sydney
498	Ric Trivett	centre	28 May 1966	v British and Irish Lions at Sydney
499	John Brass	centre	4 June 1966	v British and Irish Lions at Brisbane
500	Michael Purcell	flanker	3 December 1966	v Wales at Cardiff
501	Ross Teitzel	lock	3 December 1966	v Wales at Cardiff
502	Paul Gibbs	fly-half	17 December 1966	v Scotland at Murrayfield
503	Roy Prosser	prop	7 January 1967	v England at Twickenham
504	Richard How	wing	13 May 1967	v Ireland at Sydney
505	Hugh Rose	flanker	13 May 1967	v Ireland at Sydney
506	Tony Abrahams	lock	19 August 1967	v New Zealand at Wellington
507	Rod Batterham	wing	19 August 1967	v New Zealand at Wellington
508	Russell Manning	fullback	19 August 1967	v New Zealand at Wellington
509	Ian Proctor	wing	19 August 1967	v New Zealand at Wellington
510	Jeff Sayle	flanker	19 August 1967	v New Zealand at Wellington
511	Phil Smith	centre	19 August 1967	v New Zealand at Wellington
512	John Ballesty	fly-half	15 June 1968	v New Zealand at Sydney
513	John Cole	wing	15 June 1968	v New Zealand at Sydney
514	Arthur McGill	fullback	15 June 1968	v New Zealand at Sydney
515	Peter Reilly	lock	15 June 1968	v New Zealand at Sydney
516	Jim Roxburgh	prop	15 June 1968	v New Zealand at Sydney
517	David Taylor	no. 8	15 June 1968	v New Zealand at Sydney
518	John Hipwell	(scrum-half)	15 June 1968	v New Zealand at Sydney
519	Barry Honan	(centre)	15 June 1968	v New Zealand at Sydney
520	Stuart Gregory	lock	22 June 1968	v New Zealand at Brisbane
521	Alex Pope	(centre)	22 June 1968	v New Zealand at Brisbane
522	Terry Forman	wing	26 October 1968	v Ireland at Lansdowne Road
523	Ross Turnbull	prop	26 October 1968	v Ireland at Lansdowne Road
524	Keith Bell	prop	2 November 1968	v Scotland at Murrayfield
525	Paul Darveniza	hooker	21 June 1969	v Wales at Sydney
526	Geoff Shaw	centre	21 June 1969	v Wales at Sydney
527	Alan Skinner	no. 8	21 June 1969	v Wales at Sydney
528	Owen Butler	lock	2 August 1969	v South Africa at Johannesburg
529	Rupert Rosenblum	fly-half	2 August 1969	v South Africa at Johannesburg
530	Bruce Taafe	hooker	2 August 1969	v South Africa at Johannesburg
531	Rod Kelleher	flanker	16 August 1969	v South Africa at Durban
532	Steve Knight	centre	16 August 1969	v South Africa at Durban
533	Barry McDonald	flanker	20 September 1969	v South Africa at Bloemfontein
534	Jake Howard	prop	6 June 1970	v Scotland at Sydney
535	Bob McLean	no. 8	17 July 1971	v South Africa at Sydney
536	Geoff Richardson	fly-half	17 July 1971	v South Africa at Sydney
537	Reg Smith	lock	17 July 1971	v South Africa at Sydney
538	Peter Sullivan	flanker	17 July 1971	v South Africa at Sydney
539	John Taylor	wing	17 July 1971	v South Africa at Sydney
540	Garrick Fay	lock	31 July 1971	v South Africa at Brisbane
541	Jeff McLean	wing	31 July 1971	v South Africa at Brisbane
542	Mick Barry	scrum-half	7 August 1971	v South Africa at Sydney
543	Stuart Macdougall	prop	7 August 1971	v South Africa at Sydney
544	Robert Thompson	hooker	7 August 1971	v South Africa at Sydney
545	David Dunworth	prop	20 November 1971	v France at Toulouse
546	Russell Fairfax	fly-half	20 November 1971	v France at Toulouse
547	David L'Estrange	centre	20 November 1971	v France at Toulouse
548	Dave Burnet	centre	17 June 1972	v France at Sydney
549	Dick Cocks	no. 8	17 June 1972	v France at Sydney
550	David Rathie	centre	17 June 1972	v France at Sydney
551	Gary Grey	(scrum-half)	25 June 1972	v France at Brisbane
552	Bruce Brown	prop	19 August 1972	v New Zealand at Wellington
553	Mick Freney	hooker	19 August 1972	v New Zealand at Wellington
554	Tony Gelling	no. 8	19 August 1972	v New Zealand at Wellington
555	Barry Stumbles	(lock)	19 August 1972	v New Zealand at Wellington
556	John Cornes	scrum-half	19 September 1972	v Fiji at Suva
557	Peter Rowles	centre	19 September 1972	v Fiji at Suva
558	Robert Wood	lock	19 September 1972	v Fiji at Suva
559	Ron Graham	prop	23 June 1973	v Tonga at Sydney
560	Mark Loane	flanker	23 June 1973	v Tonga at Sydney
561	Trevor Stegman	centre	23 June 1973	v Tonga at Sydney
562	Owen Stephens	wing	23 June 1973	v Tonga at Sydney
563	Chris Carberry	hooker	30 June 1973	v Tonga at Brisbane
564	Eric Tindall	scrum-half	30 June 1973	v Tonga at Brisbane
565	Tony Shaw	no. 8	10 November 1973	v Wales at Cardiff
566	Bruce Battishall	flanker	17 November 1973	v England at Twickenham
567	Laurie Monaghan	wing	17 November 1973	v England at Twickenham
568	Roger Davis	lock	25 May 1974	v New Zealand at Sydney
569	Peter Horton	hooker	25 May 1974	v New Zealand at Sydney
570	John Lambie	flanker	25 May 1974	v New Zealand at Sydney
571	Paul McLean	fly-half	25 May 1974	v New Zealand at Sydney
572	John Meadows	prop	25 May 1974	v New Zealand at Sydney
573	Ray Price	flanker	25 May 1974	v New Zealand at Sydney
574	Greg Cornelsen	flanker	1 June 1974	v New Zealand at Brisbane
575	Bob Brown	fullback	24 May 1975	v England at Sydney
576	Steve Finnane	prop	24 May 1975	v England at Sydney
577	Douglas Osborne	wing	24 May 1975	v England at Sydney
578	John Weatherstone	centre	24 May 1975	v England at Sydney
579	Ken Wright	fly-half	24 May 1975	v England at Sydney
580	Ian Robertson	wing	2 August 1975	v Japan at Sydney
581	Rod Hauser	(scrum-half)	2 August 1975	v Japan at Sydney
582	Jim Hindmarsh	fullback	17 August 1975	v Japan at Brisbane
583	Brian Mansfield	lock	17 August 1975	v Japan at Brisbane
584	John Ryan	wing	17 August 1975	v Japan at Brisbane
585	Paddy Batch	wing	6 December 1975	v Scotland at Murrayfield
586	John Berne	centre	6 December 1975	v Scotland at Murrayfield
587	David Hillhouse	no. 8	6 December 1975	v Scotland at Murrayfield
588	Gary Pearse	(flanker)	20 December 1975	v Wales at Cardiff
589	Bill McKid	centre	3 January 1976	v England at Twickenham
590	Gregory Shambrook	centre	19 June 1976	v Fiji at Brisbane
591	Mick Ellem	fullback	26 June 1976	v Fiji at Sydney
592	Philip Crowe	wing	30 October 1976	v France at Parc des Princes
593	Martin Knight	centre	11 June 1978	v Wales at Brisbane
594	Stan Pilecki	prop	11 June 1978	v Wales at Brisbane
595	Andrew Slack	centre	11 June 1978	v Wales at Brisbane
596	Peter McLean	lock	19 August 1978	v New Zealand at Wellington
597	Steve Streeter	wing	19 August 1978	v New Zealand at Wellington
598	Brendan Moon	wing	26 August 1978	v New Zealand at Christchurch
599	Geoff Richards	(fullback)	26 August 1978	v New Zealand at Christchurch
600	Chris Handy	prop	9 September 1978	v New Zealand at Auckland
601	Tony Melrose	fly-half	9 September 1978	v New Zealand at Auckland
602	Bruce Cooke	fullback	3 June 1979	v Ireland at Brisbane
603	Bill Ross	hooker	3 June 1979	v Ireland at Brisbane
604	Keith Besomo	lock	16 June 1979	v Ireland at Sydney
605	Peter Carson	scrum-half	28 July 1979	v New Zealand at Sydney
606	Andy Stewart	flanker	28 July 1979	v New Zealand at Sydney
607	Phillip Cox	scrum-half	27 October 1979	v Argentina at Buenos Aires
608	Michael O'Connor	centre	27 October 1979	v Argentina at Buenos Aires
609	Anthony D'Arcy	prop	24 May 1980	v Fiji at Suva
610	Duncan Hall Jr.	no. 8	24 May 1980	v Fiji at Suva
611	Michael Hawker	fly-half	24 May 1980	v Fiji at Suva
612	Mick Martin	wing	24 May 1980	v Fiji at Suva
613	Mick Mathers	lock	24 May 1980	v Fiji at Suva
614	Simon Poidevin	flanker	24 May 1980	v Fiji at Suva
615	Steve Williams	lock	24 May 1980	v Fiji at Suva
616	Mark Ella	fly-half	21 June 1980	v New Zealand at Sydney
617	Roger Gould	fullback	21 June 1980	v New Zealand at Sydney
618	Declan Curran	prop	12 July 1980	v New Zealand at Sydney
619	Peter Grigg	wing	12 July 1980	v New Zealand at Sydney
620	Mitchell Cox	wing	5 December 1981	v Wales at Cardiff
621	Glen Ella	fullback	4 July 1982	v Scotland at Brisbane
622	Chris Roche	flanker	4 July 1982	v Scotland at Brisbane
623	David Campese	wing	14 August 1982	v New Zealand at Christchurch
624	John Coolican	prop	14 August 1982	v New Zealand at Christchurch
625	Gary Ella	centre	14 August 1982	v New Zealand at Christchurch
626	Peter Lucas	no. 8	14 August 1982	v New Zealand at Christchurch
627	Andy McIntyre	prop	14 August 1982	v New Zealand at Christchurch
628	Bruce Malouf	hooker	14 August 1982	v New Zealand at Christchurch
629	Lance Walker	hooker	28 August 1982	v New Zealand at Wellington
630	Steve Cutler	(lock)	28 August 1982	v New Zealand at Wellington
631	Phil Clements	lock	11 September 1982	v New Zealand at Auckland
632	Dominic Vaughan	scrum-half	9 July 1983	v United States at Sydney
633	Ross Hanley	(wing)	9 July 1983	v United States at Sydney
634	David Codey	no. 8	31 July 1983	v Argentina at Brisbane
635	Tony Parker	(scrum-half)	31 July 1983	v Argentina at Brisbane
636	Mark Harding	prop	22 October 1983	v Italy at Rovigo
637	Mark McBain	hooker	22 October 1983	v Italy at Rovigo
638	Steve Tuynman	no. 8	13 November 1983	v France at Clermont-Ferrand
639	Tom Lawton Jnr	(hooker)	13 November 1983	v France at Clermont-Ferrand
640	Bill Campbell	lock	9 June 1984	v Fiji at Suva
641	Nigel Holt	lock	9 June 1984	v Fiji at Suva
642	Michael Lynagh	centre	9 June 1984	v Fiji at Suva
643	Ross Reynolds	no. 8	9 June 1984	v Fiji at Suva
644	Enrique "Topo" Rodriguez	prop	9 June 1984	v Fiji at Suva
645	Nick Farr-Jones	scrum-half	3 November 1984	v England at Twickenham
646	Matt Burke	(wing)	3 November 1984	v England at Twickenham
647	James Black	fullback	15 June 1985	v Canada at Sydney
648	Bill Calcraft	flanker	15 June 1985	v Canada at Sydney
649	Nigel Kassulke	centre	15 June 1985	v Canada at Sydney
650	Tim Lane	centre	15 June 1985	v Canada at Sydney
651	David Knox	fly-half	10 August 1985	v Fiji at Brisbane
652	Brett Papworth	centre	10 August 1985	v Fiji at Brisbane
653	Cameron Lillicrap	prop	17 August 1985	v Fiji at Sydney
654	Michael Cook	centre	21 June 1986	v France at Sydney
655	Damien Frawley	(lock)	12 July 1986	v Argentina at Sydney
656	Mark Hartill	prop	9 August 1986	v New Zealand at Wellington
657	Jeff Miller	flanker	23 August 1986	v New Zealand at Dunedin
658	Andrew Leeds	fullback	6 September 1986	v New Zealand at Auckland
659	Brian Smith	fly-half	17 May 1987	v Korea at Brisbane
660	Anthony Herbert	(centre)	17 May 1987	v Korea at Brisbane
661	Steve James	(fly-half)	17 May 1987	v Korea at Brisbane
662	Troy Coker	no. 8	23 May 1987	v England at Sydney
663	Steve Lidbury	no. 8	31 October 1987	v Argentina at Buenos Aires
664	Ian Williams	wing	31 October 1987	v Argentina at Buenos Aires
665	Julian Gardner	flanker	7 November 1987	v Argentina at Buenos Aires
666	David Carter	no. 8	29 May 1988	v England at Brisbane
667	James Grant	centre	29 May 1988	v England at Brisbane
668	Rob Lawton	prop	29 May 1988	v England at Brisbane
669	Peter Kay	prop	12 June 1988	v England at Sydney
670	Tim Gavin	no. 8	16 July 1988	v New Zealand at Brisbane
671	Lloyd Walker	fly-half	16 July 1988	v New Zealand at Brisbane
672	Brad Girvan	centre	5 November 1988	v England at Twickenham
673	Scott Gourley	flanker	19 November 1988	v Scotland at Murrayfield
674	Acura Niuqila	wing	19 November 1988	v Scotland at Murrayfield
675	Brad Burke	(scrum-half)	19 November 1988	v Scotland at Murrayfield
676	Dan Crowley	prop	1 July 1989	v British and Irish Lions at Sydney
677	Dominic Maguire	centre	1 July 1989	v British and Irish Lions at Sydney
678	Greg Martin	fullback	1 July 1989	v British and Irish Lions at Sydney
679	Tony Daly	prop	5 August 1989	v New Zealand at Auckland
680	Tim Horan	centre	5 August 1989	v New Zealand at Auckland
681	Phil Kearns	hooker	5 August 1989	v New Zealand at Auckland
682	Peter FitzSimons	lock	4 November 1989	v France at Strasbourg
683	Jason Little	centre	4 November 1989	v France at Strasbourg
684	Rod McCall	lock	4 November 1989	v France at Strasbourg
685	Brendan Nasser	flanker	4 November 1989	v France at Strasbourg
686	Darren Junee	(fullback)	4 November 1989	v France at Strasbourg
687	Paul Carozza	wing	9 June 1990	v France at Sydney
688	Ewen McKenzie	prop	9 June 1990	v France at Sydney
689	Paul Cornish	centre	24 June 1990	v France at Brisbane
690	Sam Scott-Young	flanker	24 June 1990	v France at Brisbane
691	John Flett	wing	8 July 1990	v United States at Brisbane
692	Peter Slattery	(scrum-half)	8 July 1990	v United States at Brisbane
693	Viliami "Willie" Ofahengaue	flanker	21 July 1990	v New Zealand at Christchurch
694	John Eales	lock	22 July 1991	v Wales at Brisbane
695	Bob Egerton	wing	22 July 1991	v Wales at Brisbane
696	Marty Roebuck	fullback	22 July 1991	v Wales at Brisbane
697	David Nucifora	(hooker)	4 October 1991	v Argentina at Llanelli
698	Richard Tombs	centre	13 June 1992	v Scotland at Sydney
699	David Wilson	flanker	13 June 1992	v Scotland at Sydney
700	Peter Jorgensen	(centre)	13 June 1992	v Scotland at Sydney
701	Tim Kelaher	fullback	4 July 1992	v New Zealand at Sydney
702	Garrick Morgan	(lock)	4 July 1992	v New Zealand at Sydney
703	Paul Kahl	fly-half	21 November 1992	v Wales at Cardiff
704	Brett Johnstone	(scrum-half)	4 July 1993	v Tonga at Brisbane
705	Pat Howard	fly-half	17 July 1993	v New Zealand at Dunedin
706	Scott Bowen	fly-half	31 July 1993	v South Africa at Sydney
707	Damian Smith	wing	31 July 1993	v South Africa at Sydney
708	Warwick Waugh	lock	31 July 1993	v South Africa at Sydney
709	Ilie Tabua Tamanivalu	flanker	14 August 1993	v South Africa at Brisbane
710	Matt Burke	(fullback)	21 August 1993	v South Africa at Sydney
711	Alistair Murdoch	wing	30 October 1993	v France at Bordeaux
712	Michael Brial	(back row)	30 October 1993	v France at Bordeaux
713	Matt O'Connor	centre	5 June 1994	v Ireland at Brisbane
714	Matt Pini	fullback	5 June 1994	v Ireland at Brisbane
715	Daniel Herbert	centre	11 June 1994	v Ireland at Sydney
716	Ryan Constable	(centre)	11 June 1994	v Ireland at Sydney
717	George Gregan	scrum-half	18 June 1994	v Italy at Brisbane
718	Tim Wallace	(fly-half)	18 June 1994	v Italy at Brisbane
719	Joe Roff	wing	31 May 1995	v Canada at Port Elizabeth
720	Michael Foley	(hooker)	31 May 1995	v Canada at Port Elizabeth
721	Daniel Manu	(flanker)	3 June 1995	v Romania at Stellenbosch
722	Steve Merrick	scrum-half	22 July 1995	v New Zealand at Auckland
723	Marco Caputo	hooker	9 June 1996	v Wales at Brisbane
724	Owen Finegan	flanker	9 June 1996	v Wales at Brisbane
725	Richard Harry	prop	9 June 1996	v Wales at Brisbane
726	Sam Payne	scrum-half	22 June 1996	v Wales at Sydney
727	Ben Tune	wing	22 June 1996	v Wales at Sydney
728	Stephen Larkham	(fullback)	22 June 1996	v Wales at Sydney
729	Mark Bell	hooker	29 June 1996	v Canada at Brisbane
730	Andrew Heath	prop	29 June 1996	v Canada at Brisbane
731	John Welborn	lock	3 August 1996	v South Africa at Bloemfontein
732	Brett Robinson	(flanker)	23 October 1996	v Italy at Padova
733	Andrew Blades	prop	9 November 1996	v Scotland at Murrayfield
734	David Giffin	lock	1 December 1996	v Wales at Cardiff
735	Mitch Hardy	(wing)	21 June 1997	v France at Sydney
736	Matt Cockbain	(flanker)	28 June 1997	v France at Brisbane
737	James Holbeck	(centre)	5 July 1997	v New Zealand at Christchurch
738	Cameron Blades	prop	12 July 1997	v England at Sydney
739	Fili Finau	flanker	16 August 1997	v New Zealand at Dunedin
740	John Langford	lock	16 August 1997	v New Zealand at Dunedin
741	Toutai Kefu	(No. 8)	23 August 1997	v South Africa at Pretoria
742	Elton Flatley	fly-half	15 November 1997	v England at Twickenham
743	Tom Bowman	lock	6 June 1998	v England at Brisbane
744	Jeremy Paul	(hooker)	13 June 1998	v Scotland at Sydney
745	Nathan Grey	(centre)	20 June 1998	v Scotland at Brisbane
746	Glen Panoho	(prop)	22 August 1998	v South Africa at Johannesburg
747	Chris Whitaker	(scrum-half)	22 August 1998	v South Africa at Johannesburg
748	Manny Edmonds	fly-half	22 September 1998	v Tonga at Canberra
749	Chris Latham	fullback	21 November 1998	v France at Stade de France
750	Patricio Noriega	prop	21 November 1998	v France at Stade de France
751	Nathan Spooner	fly-half	12 June 1999	v Ireland at Brisbane
752	Tiaan Strauss	(No. 8)	12 June 1999	v Ireland at Brisbane
753	Jim Williams	(flanker)	12 June 1999	v Ireland at Brisbane
754	Mark Connors	(flanker)	17 July 1999	v South Africa at Brisbane
755	Rod Kafer	fly-half	28 August 1999	v New Zealand at Sydney
756	Rod Moore	prop	14 October 1999	v United States at Limerick
757	Scott Staniforth	wing	14 October 1999	v United States at Limerick
758	Fletcher Dyson	prop	17 June 2000	v Argentina at Brisbane
759	Stirling Mortlock	wing	17 June 2000	v Argentina at Brisbane
760	Sam Cordingley	(scrum-half)	17 June 2000	v Argentina at Brisbane
761	David Lyons	(No. 8)	17 June 2000	v Argentina at Brisbane
762	Troy Jaques	(back row)	8 July 2000	v South Africa at Melbourne
763	Andrew Walker	(wing)	15 July 2000	v New Zealand at Sydney
764	George Smith	flanker	4 November 2000	v France at Stade de France
765	Bill Young	prop	4 November 2000	v France at Stade de France
766	Phil Waugh	(flanker)	18 November 2000	v England at Twickenham
767	Nick Stiles	prop	30 June 2001	v British and Irish Lions at Brisbane
768	Ben Darwin	(prop)	30 June 2001	v British and Irish Lions at Brisbane
769	Brendan Cannon	(hooker)	7 July 2001	v British and Irish Lions at Melbourne
770	Justin Harrison	lock	14 July 2001	v British and Irish Lions at Sydney
771	Graeme Bond	(wing)	18 August 2001	v South Africa at Perth
772	Steve Kefu	(centre)	25 November 2001	v Wales at Millennium Stadium
773	Wendell Sailor	wing	22 June 2002	v France at Melbourne
774	Nathan Sharpe	lock	22 June 2002	v France at Melbourne
775	Mat Rogers	(utility back)	22 June 2002	v France at Melbourne
776	Sean Hardman	(hooker)	29 June 2002	v France at Sydney
777	Dan Vickerman	(lock)	29 June 2002	v France at Sydney
778	David Croft	(flanker)	2 November 2002	v Argentina at Buenos Aires
779	Adam Freier	(hooker)	2 November 2002	v Argentina at Buenos Aires
780	Matt Giteau	(fly-half)	16 November 2002	v England at Twickenham
781	Mark Bartholomeusz	(utility back)	23 November 2002	v Italy at Genova
782	Morgan Turinui	centre	7 June 2003	v Ireland at Perth
783	Lote Tuqiri	(outside back)	7 June 2003	v Ireland at Perth
784	Daniel Heenan	(flanker)	14 June 2003	v Wales at Sydney
785	Alastair Baxter	(prop)	16 August 2003	v New Zealand at Auckland
786	Matt Dunning	prop	25 October 2003	v Namibia at Adelaide
787	John Roe	(no. 8)	25 October 2003	v Namibia at Adelaide
788	Clyde Rathbone	centre	13 June 2004	v Scotland at Melbourne
789	Radike Samo	flanker	13 June 2004	v Scotland at Melbourne
790	Matt Henjak	(scrum-half)	26 June 2004	v England at Brisbane
791	Nic Henderson	(prop)	3 July 2004	v Pacific Islanders at Adelaide
792	Mark Chisholm	(lock)	6 November 2004	v Scotland at Murrayfield
793	Stephen Hoiles	(back row)	20 November 2004	v Scotland at Glasgow
794	Rocky Elsom	flanker	11 June 2005	v Samoa at Sydney
795	Hugh McMeniman	(lock)	11 June 2005	v Samoa at Sydney
796	Stephen Moore	(hooker)	11 June 2005	v Samoa at Sydney
797	Mark Gerrard	(wing)	25 June 2005	v Italy at Melbourne
798	Alister Campbell	(lock)	2 July 2005	v France at Brisbane
799	Drew Mitchell	(centre)	9 July 2005	v South Africa at Sydney
800	Adam Ashley-Cooper	(utility back)	20 August 2005	v South Africa at Perth
801	Lloyd Johansson	(centre)	3 September 2005	v New Zealand at Auckland
802	Al Kanaar	(lock)	3 September 2005	v New Zealand at Auckland
803	Lachlan MacKay	(fullback)	3 September 2005	v New Zealand at Auckland
804	Greg Holmes	(prop)	5 November 2005	v France at Marseille
805	Scott Fava	(no. 8)	12 November 2005	v England at Twickenham
806	Tatafu Polota-Nau	(hooker)	12 November 2005	v England at Twickenham
807	David Fitter	prop	19 November 2005	v Ireland at Lansdowne Road
808	Rodney Blake	prop	11 June 2006	v England at Sydney
809	Tai McIsaac	hooker	11 June 2006	v England at Sydney
810	Cameron Shepherd	(fullback)	11 June 2006	v England at Sydney
811	Josh Valentine	(scrum-half)	11 June 2006	v England at Sydney
812	Wycliff Palu	(no. 8)	17 June 2006	v England at Melbourne
813	Guy Shepherdson	prop	24 June 2006	v Ireland at Perth
814	Benn Robinson	prop	9 September 2006	v South Africa at Johannesburg
815	Brett Sheehan	(scrum-half)	9 September 2006	v South Africa at Johannesburg
816	Julian Huxley	fullback	26 May 2007	v Wales at Sydney
817	Sam Norton-Knight	fly-half	26 May 2007	v Wales at Sydney
818	Digby Ioane	wing	2 June 2007	v Wales at Brisbane
819	James Horwill	lock	9 June 2007	v Fiji at Perth
820	Berrick Barnes	(fly-half)	8 September 2007	v Japan at Lyon
821	Luke Burgess	scrum-half	14 June 2008	v Ireland at Melbourne
822	Peter Hynes	wing	14 June 2008	v Ireland at Melbourne
823	Dean Mumm	(lock)	14 June 2008	v Ireland at Melbourne
824	Ben Alexander	(prop)	28 June 2008	v France at Sydney
825	Ryan Cross	(centre)	28 June 2008	v France at Sydney
826	Lachlan Turner	wing	5 July 2008	v France at Brisbane
827	Timana Tahu	(centre)	26 July 2008	v New Zealand at Sydney
828	Richard Brown	(no. 8)	13 September 2008	v New Zealand at Brisbane
829	David Pocock	(flanker)	1 November 2008	v New Zealand at Hong Kong
830	Quade Cooper	(fly-half)	8 November 2008	v Italy at Padova
831	Sekope Kepu	(prop)	8 November 2008	v Italy at Padova
832	James O'Connor	(fullback)	8 November 2008	v Italy at Padova
833	Peter Kimlin	(flanker)	13 June 2009	v Italy at Canberra
834	Pek Cowan	prop	20 June 2009	v Italy at Melbourne
835	Will Genia	(scrum-half)	18 July 2009	v New Zealand at Auckland
836	Kurtley Beale	(wing)	28 November 2009	v Wales at Millennium Stadium
837	Huia Edmonds	hooker	5 June 2010	v Fiji at Canberra
838	Rob Horne	centre	5 June 2010	v Fiji at Canberra
839	Salesi Ma'afu	prop	5 June 2010	v Fiji at Canberra
840	Saia Fainga'a	hooker	5 June 2010	v Fiji at Canberra
841	Matt Hodgson	flanker	5 June 2010	v Fiji at Canberra
842	Ben Daley	prop	12 June 2010	v England at Perth
843	James Slipper	prop	12 June 2010	v England at Perth
844	Rob Simmons	(lock)	24 July 2010	v South Africa at Brisbane
845	Ben McCalman	(no. 8)	24 July 2010	v South Africa at Brisbane
846	Anthony Fainga'a	(centre)	31 July 2010	v New Zealand at Melbourne
847	Pat McCabe	(centre)	20 November 2010	v Italy at Firenze
848	Scott Higginbotham	(flanker)	27 November 2010	v France at Saint-Denis
849	Sitaleki Timani	lock	17 July 2011	v Samoa at Sydney
850	Nick Phipps	scrum-half	17 July 2011	v Samoa at Sydney
851	Rodney Davies	wing	17 July 2011	v Samoa at Sydney
852	Beau Robinson	(flanker)	17 July 2011	v Samoa at Sydney
853	Ben Tapuai	(centre)	3 December 2011	v Wales at Cardiff
854	Dave Dennis	flanker	5 June 2012	v Scotland at Newcastle
855	Mike Harris	centre	5 June 2012	v Scotland at Newcastle
856	Luke Morahan	fullback	5 June 2012	v Scotland at Newcastle
857	Dan Palmer	prop	5 June 2012	v Scotland at Newcastle
858	Joe Tomane	centre	5 June 2012	v Scotland at Newcastle
859	Michael Hooper	(flanker)	5 June 2012	v Scotland at Newcastle
860	Cooper Vuna	wing	9 June 2012	v Wales at Brisbane
861	Liam Gill	(flanker)	25 August 2012	v New Zealand at Auckland
862	Dominic Shipperley	(wing)	8 September 2012	v South Africa at Perth
863	Kane Douglas	lock	15 September 2012	v Argentina at Gold Coast
864	Nick Cummins	wing	6 October 2012	v Argentina at Rosario
865	James Hanson	(hooker)	20 October 2012	v New Zealand at Brisbane
866	Paddy Ryan	(prop)	20 October 2012	v France at Saint-Denis
867	Israel Folau	wing	22 June 2013	v British and Irish Lions at Brisbane
868	Christian Leali'ifano	centre	22 June 2013	v British and Irish Lions at Brisbane
869	Ben Mowen	flanker	22 June 2013	v British and Irish Lions at Brisbane
870	Jesse Mogg	(wing)	6 July 2013	v British and Irish Lions at Sydney
871	Matt To'omua	fly-half	17 August 2013	v New Zealand at Sydney
872	Tevita Kuridrani	(centre)	17 August 2013	v New Zealand at Sydney
873	Scott Fardy	(flanker)	17 August 2013	v New Zealand at Sydney
874	Scott Sio	(prop)	17 August 2013	v New Zealand at Sydney
875	Nic White	(scrum-half)	17 August 2013	v New Zealand at Sydney
876	Chris Feauai-Sautia	(wing)	28 September 2013	v South Africa at Cape Town
877	Bernard Foley	(fly-half)	5 October 2013	v Argentina at Rosario
878	Peter Betham	wing	19 October 2013	v New Zealand at Dunedin
879	Sam Carter	lock	7 June 2014	v France at Brisbane
880	Nathan Charles	(hooker)	14 June 2014	v France at Melbourne
881	Luke Jones	(lock)	14 June 2014	v France at Melbourne
882	Laurie Weeks	(prop)	14 June 2014	v France at Melbourne
883	Will Skelton	lock	21 June 2014	v France at Sydney
884	Joshua Mann-Rea	(hooker)	4 October 2014	v Argentina at Mendoza
885	Jake Schatz	(no. 8)	4 October 2014	v Argentina at Mendoza
886	Sean McMahon	flanker	8 September 2014	v Wales at Cardiff
877	Tetera Faulkner	(prop)	8 September 2014	v Wales at Cardiff
888	Henry Speight	wing	22 September 2014	v Ireland at Dublin
889	Taqele Naiyaravoro	(wing)	5 September 2015	v United States at Chicago
890	Toby Smith	(prop)	5 September 2015	v United States at Chicago
891	Rory Arnold	lock	11 June 2016	v England at Brisbane
892	Dane Haylett-Petty	wing	11 June 2016	v England at Brisbane
893	Samu Kerevi	centre	11 June 2016	v England at Brisbane
894	Nick Frisby	(scrum-half)	11 June 2016	v England at Brisbane
895	Adam Coleman	(lock)	25 June 2016	v England at Sydney
896	Allan Alaalatoa	(prop)	20 August 2016	v New Zealand at Sydney
897	Reece Hodge	(wing)	27 August 2016	v New Zealand at Wellington
898	Tom Robertson	(prop)	17 September 2016	v Argentina at Perth
899	Lopeti Timani	(flanker)	17 September 2016	v Argentina at Perth
900	Sefa Naivalu	(wing)	1 October 2016	v South Africa at Pretoria
901	Leroy Houston	(no. 8)	8 October 2016	v Argentina at London
902	Tolu Latu	(hooker)	5 November 2016	v Wales at Cardiff
903	Kyle Godwin	centre	19 November 2016	v France at Paris
904	Ned Hanigan	flanker	10 June 2017	v Fiji at Melbourne
905	Karmichael Hunt	centre	10 June 2017	v Fiji at Melbourne
906	Richard Hardwick	(no. 8)	10 June 2017	v Fiji at Melbourne
907	Joe Powell	(scrum-half)	10 June 2017	v Fiji at Melbourne
908	Eto Nabuli	wing	17 June 2017	v Scotland at Sydney
909	Jack Dempsey	(lock)	24 June 2017	v Italy at Brisbane
910	Curtis Rona	wing	19 August 2017	v New Zealand at Sydney
911	Izack Rodda	(lock)	26 August 2017	v New Zealand at Dunedin
912	Jordan Uelese	(hooker)	9 September 2017	v South Africa at Perth
913	Marika Koroibete	(wing)	16 September 2017	v Argentina at Canberra
914	Lukhan Salakaia-Loto (Note: Lukhan Salakaia-Loto legally changed his name from Lukhan Tui in October 2018, hyphenating Salakaia as the surname of his late stepfather with Loto from part of his birth father's last name.)	(lock)	30 September 2017	v South Africa at Bloemfontein
915	Matt Philip	(lock)	4 November 2017	v Japan at Yokohama
916	Blake Enever	lock	18 November 2017	v England at London
917	Taniela Tupou	(prop)	25 November 2017	v Scotland at Edinburgh
918	Brandon Paenga-Amosa	hooker	9 June 2018	v Ireland at Brisbane
919	Caleb Timu	no. 8	9 June 2018	v Ireland at Brisbane
920	Pete Samu	(no. 8)	9 June 2018	v Ireland at Brisbane
921	Jermaine Ainsley	(prop)	18 August 2018	v New Zealand at Sydney
922	Jack Maddocks	(wing)	18 August 2018	v New Zealand at Sydney
923	Tom Banks	(fullback)	25 August 2018	v New Zealand at Auckland
924	Folau Fainga'a	(hooker)	25 August 2018	v New Zealand at Auckland
925	Jake Gordon	scrum-half	17 November 2018	v Italy at Padova
926	Isi Naisarani	no. 8	20 July 2019	v South Africa at Johannesburg
927	Harry Johnson-Holmes	(prop)	20 July 2019	v South Africa at Johannesburg
928	Liam Wright	(flanker)	17 August 2019	v New Zealand at Auckland
929	Rob Valetini	(no. 8)	7 September 2019	v Samoa at Sydney
930	Jordan Petaia	wing	5 October 2019	v Uruguay at Oita
931	Filipo Daugunu	wing	11 October 2020	v New Zealand at Wellington
932	Hunter Paisami	outside centre	11 October 2020	v New Zealand at Wellington
933	Harry Wilson	flanker	11 October 2020	v New Zealand at Wellington
934	Noah Lolesio	fly-half	31 October 2020	v New Zealand at Sydney
935	Irae Simone	centre	31 October 2020	v New Zealand at Sydney
936	Tate McDermott	(scrum-half)	31 October 2020	v New Zealand at Sydney
937	Fraser McReight	(flanker)	31 October 2020	v New Zealand at Sydney
938	Lachlan Swinton	flanker	7 November 2020	v New Zealand at Brisbane
939	Tom Wright	wing	7 November 2020	v New Zealand at Brisbane
940	Angus Bell	(prop)	7 November 2020	v New Zealand Brisbane
941	Andrew Kellaway	(wing)	7 July 2021	v France at Brisbane
942	Lachlan Lonergan	(hooker)	7 July 2021	v France at Brisbane
943	Darcy Swain	(lock)	7 July 2021	v France at Brisbane
944	Len Ikitau	(centre)	13 July 2021	v France at Melbourne
945	Feleti Kaitu'u	(hooker)	12 September 2021	v South Africa at Gold Coast
946	Rob Leota	(flanker)	12 September 2021	v South Africa at Gold Coast
947	Connal McInerney	(hooker)	24 October 2021	v Japan at Oita
948	Izaia Perese	(wing)	7 November 2021	v Scotland at Edinburgh
949	Ollie Hoskins	(prop)	13 November 2021	v England at London
950	Lalakai Foketi	(centre)	20 November 2021	v Wales at Cardiff
951	Cadeyrn Neville	lock	2 July 2022	v England at Perth
952	Dave Porecki	hooker	2 July 2022	v England at Perth
953	Nick Frost	(lock)	9 July 2022	v England at Brisbane
954	Suliasi Vunivalu	(wing)	16 July 2022	v England at Sydney
955	Jed Holloway	flanker	6 August 2022	v Argentina at Mendoza
956	Matt Gibbon	(prop)	6 August 2022	v Argentina at Mendoza
957	Pone Fa'amausili	(prop)	13 August 2022	v Argentina at San Juan
958	Billy Pollard	(hooker)	13 August 2022	v Argentina at San Juan
959	Jock Campbell	(fullback)	29 October 2022	v Scotland at Edinburgh
960	Langi Gleeson	(no. 8)	29 October 2022	v Scotland at Edinburgh
961	Mark Nawaqanitawase	wing	12 November 2022	v Italy at Florence
962	Ben Donaldson	(fly-half)	12 November 2022	v Italy at Florence
963	Sam Talakai	(prop)	26 November 2022	v Wales at Cardiff
964	Tom Hooper	flanker	8 July 2023	v South Africa at Pretoria
965	Richie Arnold	(lock)	8 July 2023	v South Africa at Pretoria
966	Zane Nonggorr	(prop)	8 July 2023	v South Africa at Pretoria
967	Carter Gordon	(fly-half)	8 July 2023	v South Africa at Pretoria
968	Josh Kemeny	(flanker)	15 July 2023	v Argentina at Sydney
969	Matt Faessler	(hooker)	5 August 2023	v New Zealand at Dunedin
970	Blake Schoupp	(prop)	5 August 2023	v New Zealand at Dunedin
971	Issak Fines-Leleiwasa	(scrumhalf)	27 August 2023	v France at Saint-Denis
972	Josh Flook	(centre)	6 July 2024	v Wales at Sydney
973	Jeremy Williams	(second row)	6 July 2024	v Wales at Sydney
974	Angus Blyth	(second row)	6 July 2024	v Wales at Sydney
975	Isaac Aedo Kailea	(prop)	6 July 2024	v Wales at Sydney
976	Charlie Cale	(flanker)	6 July 2024	v Wales at Sydney
977	Tom Lynagh	(flyhalf)	6 July 2024	v Wales at Sydney
978	Dylan Pietsch	(winger)	6 July 2024	v Wales at Sydney
979	Josh Nasser	(hooker)	13 July 2024	v Wales at Melbourne
980	Darby Lancaster	(winger)	20 July 2024	v Georgia at Sydney
981	Alex Hodgman	(prop)	20 July 2024	v Georgia at Sydney
982	Carlo Tizzano	(flanker)	10 August 2024	v South Africa at Brisbane
983	Luke Reimer	(flanker)	10 August 2024	v South Africa at Brisbane
984	Max Jorgensen	(winger)	17 August 2024	v South Africa at Perth
985	Seru Uru	(flanker)	17 August 2024	v South Africa at Perth
986	Hamish Stewart	(centre)	1 September 2024	v Argentina at La Plata
987	Josh Canham	(second row)	8 September 2024	v Argentina at Santa Fe
988	Joseph Sua'ali'i	(centre)	10 November 2024	v England at Twickenham
989	Harry Potter	(winger)	25 November 2024	v Scotland at Murrayfield
990	Tane Edmed	(flyhalf)	1 December 2024	v Ireland at Lansdowne Road
991	Nick Champion de Crespigny	(flanker)	19 July 2025	v British and Irish Lions at Brisbane
992	Corey Toole	(winger)	23 August 2025	v South Africa at Cape Town
993	Ryan Lonergan	(scrumhalf)	27 September 2025	v New Zealand at Auckland
994	Aidan Ross	(prop)	25 October 2025	v Japan at Tokyo
995	Kalani Thomas	(scrumhalf)	22 November 2025	v France at Saint-Denis
996	Lachlan Shaw	(second row)	4 July 2026	v Ireland at Sydney
997	Declan Meredith	(flyhalf)	11 July 2026	v France at Brisbane
998	Miles Amatosero	(second row)	18 July 2026	v Italy at Perth
999	Isaac Henry	(centre)	8 August 2026	v Japan at Osaka
1000	Massimo de Lutiis	(prop)	15 August 2026	v Japan at Townsville
1001	Harry McLaughlin-Phillips	(flyhalf)	17 October 2026	v New Zealand at Sydney

== Uncapped Wallabies players ==
The list includes uncapped players who have appeared in a tour match or been in a Wallabies squad.

Name	Position	Source	Notes
Bert Abbott	Flanker		1928 tour to New Zealand
Bill Abram	Prop		Reserve vs Italy in 1986
Cecil Adair	Winger		Reserve vs New Zealand in 1929
William Atkin	Fly half		Reserve vs New Zealand in 1924
William Austin	Flanker		Emergency vs Great Britain in 1899
Bruce Bailey	Prop		1963 tour to South Africa
Graham Bailey	Centre		1957/58 tour to Great Britain
John Bain	Hooker		1953 tour to South Africa
Tom Barker	Flanker/No. 8		1978 tour to New Zealand
Nicky Barr	Hooker		1939/40 tour to Great Britain
Harry Bartley	Fly-half		1928 tour to New Zealand
David Bedgood	Back row		Reserve vs British Lions in 1959
Shaun Berne	Fly-half		2004 tour to Europe
Stan Bisset	No. 8		1939/40 tour to Great Britain
John Black	Winger		Reserve vs New Zealand in 1922
Ken Burke	Fullback		Reserve vs New Zealand in 1926
Greggory Burrow	Prop		1984 tour to Great Britain / 1986 tour to New Zealand
Andrew Cairns	Half-back		1990 tour to New Zealand
Cliff Campbell	Fly-Half		1933 tour to South Africa
Des Carrick	Centre		1939/40 tour to Great Britain
Mark Catchpole	Scrum-half		1993 tour to France & North America
Mitchell Chapman	Flanker		2006 Spring tour / 2009 Spring tour
David Clark	Fullback		Reserve vs New Zealand in 1962
Phil Clark	Utility back		1931 tour to New Zealand
John Cocks	Halfback		1958 tour to New Zealand
Pat Cooper	Halfback		Reserve vs British Lions in 1966
Rod Crerar	Hooker		1983 tour to France & Italy
David Crombie	Hooker		Reserve vs New Zealand in 1967
Ross Cullen	Hooker		1966/67 tour to Great Britain
Peter Cunningham	Flanker		1912 tour to North America
Herbert Daly	Centre		1908/09 tour to Great Britain
Jack Dawson	Centre		Reserve vs New Zealand in 1922
Tony Dempsey	Flanker		1993 tour to France & North America
Geoff Didier	Front row		1990 tour to New Zealand
David Dix	Lock		1989 tour to France & Canada/ 1992 tour to Ireland & Wales
Bernie Doneley	Back row		1933 tour to South Africa
Leigh Donnellan	Prop		Reserve vs British Lions in 1989
Fred Doran	Centre		1925 tour to New Zealand
Philip Doyle	Halfback		Reserve vs Combined Services in 1988
Mel Dunne	Flanker/Lock		Reserve vs Ireland in 1967
Owen Edwards	Halfback		1961 tour to South Africa
Bryan Egan	Centre		1936 tour to New Zealand
Ben Egan	Centre		1927/28 tour to Great Britain
Glenn Eisenhauer	Lock/No.8		1975/76 tour to Great Britain / 1976 tour to France & Italy
Anthony Ekert	Halfback		1992 tour to Ireland & Wales
Tom English	Centre/Wing		2014 Spring tour
Alec Evans	Prop		1962 tour to New Zealand
George Evans	Halfback		Reserve vs Fiji in 1961 / Reserves vs France in 1961
Francis Eyre	Front row		Reserve vs New Zealand in 1920
Gene Fairbanks	Centre		2006 tour to Europe
William Fisher	Halfback		Squad member vs Fiji in 1952
Michael Fitzgerald	Fullback		1975/76 tour to Great Britain
Joseph FitzSimons	Centre/Winger		Reserve vs New Zealand in 1947
Mick Flynn	Flanker		1971 tour to France & North America
Stanley Foote	Winger		Reserve vs New Zealand in 1914
Leonard Foote	Threequarter		Reserve vs New Zealand in 1914
Len Forbes	Front row		1958 tour to New Zealand
John Francis	Centre		1966/67 tour to Great Britain
Munro Fraser	Forward		1912 tour to North America
John Fuller	Loose forward		1947/48 tour to Great Britain
Gary Gainsford	Halfback		Reserve vs New Zealand in 1979
John Garry	Front row		Reserves vs New Zealand in 1903
John Georgeson	Halfback		Reserve vs New Zealand in 1924
Kevin Gormley	Centre		Squad member vs New Zealand in 1923
Geoff Gourlay	Lock		1946 tour to New Zealand
Bert Grace	Wing		1933 tour to South Africa
Norman Green	Backrow		Squad member vs New Zealand Maori in 1949
James Gibson	Centre		Reserve vs New Zealand in 1929
John Griffiths	Prop		1982 tour to New Zealand
Ollie Hall	Prop		1983 tour to France & Italy
Bruce Harland	Centre		1962 tour to New Zealand
John Halter	Prop		Reserve vs New Zealand Maori in 1958
Lars Hedberg	Prop		Reserve vs New Zealand in 1974
Bernard Hesslein	Threequarter		Reserve vs New Zealand in 1926
Ralph Hill	Flanker		1912 tour to North America / 1913 tour to New Zealand
Kevin Hodda	Hooker		1946 tour to New Zealand
Van Humphries	Lock		2010 Spring tour
Mitch Inman	Centre		2012 Spring tour
Michael Jenkinson	Hooker		1963 tour to South Africa
Laurie Johnson	Wing		1952 tour to New Zealand
Peter Johnston	Prop		Reserve vs Fiji in 1976
Jason Jones-Hughes	Centre		1997 tour to Argentina
Tim Kava	Lock		1989 tour to France & Canada / 1993 tour to France & North America
Francis King	Winger		Reserve vs New Zealand in 1925
Richard Kingi	Halfback		2009 Spring tour
John Kirk	Front-row		Reserve vs New Zealand in 1947
John Klem	Scrumhalf		1963 tour to South Africa
Paddy Knapp	Back-row forward		Reserve vs Fiji in 1961
Norman Lamport	Halfback		Reserve vs New Zealand in 1929
Bill Langenberg	Prop		1928 tour to New Zealand
Andy Laurie	Hooker		1962 tour to New Zealand / 1964 tour to New Zealand
Laurie Lawrence	Halfback		1964 tour to New Zealand
Barry Lea	Wing		1993 tour to France & North America
Frank Lehmann	Front row		Squad member vs New Zealand in 1938
Norman Lloyd	Hooker		Reserve vs New Zealand in 1914
Adam Magro	Centre		1996 tour to Europe / 1997 tour to Argentina
Billy Mann	Wing		1927/28 tour to Great Britain
Anthony Mathison	Prop		2005 tour to Europe
Norman Mayne	Halfback		Reserve vs South Africa in 1965
Selwyn McCausland	Flanker		Reserve vs New Zealand in 1924
Ken McCurrach	No.8		1973 tour to Europe
Pat McCutcheon	Back row		2010 Spring tour
Don McDeed	Hooker		1961 tour to South Africa
Adrian McDonald	Halfback		1991 Rugby World Cup
James McInerney	No. 8		1986 tour to New Zealand
Mark McInnes	No.8		1989 tour to France & Canada
Ted McIntyre	Prop		1908/09 tour to Great Britain
Gray McLean	Lock		1958 tour to New Zealand
Jack McLean	Wing		1946 tour to New Zealand
Charles McMurtrie	No. 8		1908/09 tour to Great Britain
Francis McPhillips	Fullback		1933 tour to South Africa
Robert Miles	Fly half		Reserve vs New Zealand in 1929
Victor Miller	Centre		Reserve vs New Zealand in 1938
Tony Moore	Fly-half		1966/67 tour to Great Britain
Peter Moore	Wing		1969 tour to South Africa
Ned Morey	Lock		1953 tour to South Africa
Craig Morton	Wing		1986 tour to New Zealand
Mark Morton	Hooker		1933 tour to South Africa
Cecil Murnin	Loose forward		1905 tour to New Zealand / 1908/09 tour to Great Britain
Arthur Murray	Back row		Reserves vs New Zealand in 1926
Michael Murray	Prop		1986 tour to New Zealand
Glenn Nichols	Wing		Reserve vs Fiji in 1976
Vaux Nicholson	Wing		1939/40 tour to Great Britain
Shane Nightingale	Lock		1982 tour to New Zealand
Ned O'Brien	Lock		1905 tour to New Zealand
Denis O'Callaghan	Flanker		1966/67 tour to Great Britain
Wilfred O'Connor	Back row		Reserve vs New Zealand in 1938
Kevin O'Hara	Fullback/Wing		Reserve vs New Zealand in 1974
Rob Onus	No.8/Lock		1978 tour to New Zealand
Brian Oxenham	Flanker		1939/40 tour to Great Britain
Duncan Paia'aua	Centre		2021 Spring tour
Mitchell Palm	Fly-half		1989 tour to France & Canada
Bryan Palmer	Wing/Fly-half		1931 tour to New Zealand
Len Palmer	Prop		1925 tour to New Zealand
Harcourt Pascoe-Pearce	Lock		1923 tour to New Zealand
George Pearson	Prop		1939/40 tour to Great Britain
Herbert Perkins	Front row		Reserve vs New Zealand in 1914
Peter Phipps	Utility back		1955 tour to New Zealand
Basil Porter	Wing		1939/40 tour to Great Britain
Don Price	No. 8		1980 tour to Fiji
Harold Primrose	Fly-half		1931 tour to New Zealand
Frank Reville	Flanker		1931 tour to New Zealand
John Ritter	Front row		1931 tour to New Zealand / 1933 tour to South Africa
Richard Roberts	Forward		1913 tour to New Zealand
John Ross	Flanker		1990 tour to New Zealand
Matthew Ryan	Prop		1990 tour to New Zealand / 1992 tour to South Africa / 1992 tour to Ireland & Wales
Roger Salter	Three-quarter		Reserve vs New Zealand in 1938
Stuart Scotts	Lock/Flanker		1957/58 tour to Great Britain
Adrian Skeggs	Front row		1993 tour to France & North America
Leonard Smith	Centre		1939/40 tour to Great Britain
Tyrone Smith	Centre		2009 Spring tour
Paul Southwell	Utility back		1982 tour to New Zealand
Sean Spence	Fullback		1962 tour to New Zealand
Geoff Steanes	Forward		1921 tour to New Zealand
Jim Stenmark	Forward		1947/48 tour to Great Britain
Joseph Stevenson	Halfback		1908/09 tour to Great Britain
Nic Stirzaker	Scrum-half		2016 Spring tour
Ricky Stuart	Halfback/Fly-half		1987 tour to Argentina
Shane Sullivan	Prop		1969 tour to South Africa
Fred Swenson	Halfback		Reserve vs New Zealand in 1914
William Swenson	Backrow		Reserve vs New Zealand in 1914
Dick Taylor	Hooker		1966/67 tour to Great Britain
Andy Town	Fly-half		1962 tour to New Zealand
Herb Trousdale	Centre		1923 tour to New Zealand
Russell Tulloch	Flanker		1966/67 tour to Great Britain
Jack Turnbull	Front row		1939/40 tour to Great Britain
Malcolm van Gelder	Hooker/Flanker		1966/67 tour to Great Britain
Dwayne Vignes	Wing		Reserve vs New Zealand in 1987
Roland Waddington	Lock		Reserve vs New Zealand in 1929
Warwick Wakefield	Centre/Winger		Reserve vs New Zealand Maori in 1949
Gordon Walker	Centre/Fullback		1921 tour to New Zealand
Leonard Walker	Fullback		Reserve vs New Zealand in 1938
Adam Wallace-Harrison	Lock		2005 Spring tour
Allan Ware	Centre/Wing		1949 tour to New Zealand
Bill Warlow	Wing		1933 tour to South Africa
Warwick Watkins	Hooker		Reserve vs New Zealand in 1980
Dick Webb	Wing		1966/67 tour to Great Britain
Brian Weir	Fullback		1969 tour to South Africa
Fred Whyatt	Lock/No. 8		1931 tour to New Zealand
Dirk Williams	Flanker		1996 tour to Europe
John Wolfe	Fullback/Wing		1963 tour to South Africa
Barry Wright	Centre/Fly-half		1955 tour to New Zealand
Jim Wylie	Forward		1912 tour to North America
Jack Young	Centre		1933 tour to South Africa

== See also ==
- Australia rugby union captains
- List of international rugby union families
