= Mingay (surname) =

Mingay is a surname. Notable people with the surname include:

- Ben Mingay (born 1980), Australian actor and singer
- Gordon Mingay (1923–2006), British historian
- Harry Mingay (born 1895), English football goalkeeper
- Hugh Mingay (born 1974), musician
- Norm Mingay (1899–1955), Australian rugby union player
- Oswald Francis (Os) Mingay (1895-1973), Australian public servant, army signalman, radio manufacturer and prolific publisher of radio industry magazines
