= Patrick Mulligan =

Patrick Mulligan may refer to:

- Patrick Mulligan (bishop) (1912–1990), Roman Catholic Lord Bishop of Clogher in Ireland
- Patrick Mulligan (rugby union) (c. 1900–?), Australian rugby union player
- Paddy Mulligan (Patrick Martin Mulligan, born 1945), Irish footballer
- Patrick Mulligan (character), alter ego of the comic book character Toxin
