= Laurie Johnson (rugby union) =

Laurence Johnson
- Full name: Laurence Wilfred Johnson
- Born: 1 August 1927 Sydney, Australia
- Died: 6 February 2009 (aged 81)
- Height: 5 ft 10 in (178 cm)
- Weight: 12.10 st (169 lb; 77 kg)

Rugby union career
- Position: Winger
International career
Years	Team	Apps	(Points)
1952	Australia		

Laurence Wilfred Johnson (1 August 1927 – 6 February 2009) was an Australian international rugby union player.

Johnson was a three quarter, mostly utilised on a wing, but could also play fullback. He played his rugby in Melbourne for the Navy club, which he served as captain. In 1952, Johnson represented the Wallabies on their tour of New Zealand, where he made three uncapped appearances. He also earned representative honours for Australian Combined Services, United Services and Victoria, representing the latter against the 1957 All Blacks and 1959 British Lions.

== See also ==
- List of Australia national rugby union players
