= Peter Moore (rugby union) =

Australia international rugby union player

- Full name: Peter Douglas Moore
- Born: 24 March 1948 (age 78) Brisbane, QLD, Australia
- Height: 170 cm (5 ft 7 in)
- Weight: 80 kg (176 lb)
- School: St Columban's College, Albion

Rugby union career
- Position: Three-quarter
Provincial / State sides
Years	Team	Apps	(Points)
1969–70	Queensland		
International career
Years	Team	Apps	(Points)
1969	Australia		

Peter Douglas Moore (born 24 March 1948) is an Australian former international rugby union player.

Moore was educated at Brisbane's St Columban's College, where had two seasons as a back in the 1st XV, while also captaining the school in athletics, excelling as a sprinter.

A three-quarter, Moore made his first grade debut with Brothers in 1968 and the following year broke into the Queensland state side, with their match against New South Wales serving as a trial for the upcoming Wallabies tour of South Africa. He performed well enough to earn selection as one of four wingers in the touring squad. Over the course of the tour, Moore made 10 uncapped appearances, but was unable to force his way into the XV against the Springboks.

Moore crossed to rugby league in 1971 and played for Souths.

== See also ==
- List of Australia national rugby union players
