= Paddy Knapp =

- Full name: Patrick Joseph Knapp
- Born: 20 April 1939 (age 87) Brisbane, QLD, Australia

Rugby union career
- Position: Back-row
Provincial / State sides
Years	Team	Apps	(Points)
1961	Queensland		
International career
Years	Team	Apps	(Points)
1961	Australia		

Patrick Joseph Knapp (born 20 April 1939) is an Australian former international rugby union player.

Born in Brisbane, Knapp was educated at Marist College Ashgrove, Hawkesbury College and Duntroon Military College.

Knapp, a Brothers back-rower, made his Queensland debut in 1961 and was a Wallabies reserve for that year's Test against Fiji at the Exhibition Ground in Brisbane, before retiring from rugby aged 22.

== See also ==
- List of Australia national rugby union players
