= Ned O'Brien =

- Full name: Edward Joseph O'Brien
- Born: Unknown Tipperary, Ireland
- Died: 11 September 1953

Rugby union career
- Position: Lock
Provincial / State sides
Years	Team	Apps	(Points)
- Queensland
International career
Years	Team	Apps	(Points)
1905	Australia		

Edward Joseph O'Brien was an Australian international rugby union player.

== Biography ==
Emigrating from Ireland at age 16, O'Brien was based in Central Queensland and went by the nickname "Hannah".

O'Brien was a Queensland representative lock forward and gained international honours on Australia's 1905 tour of New Zealand, where he featured in minor matches against Canterbury and Auckland, after which he retired.

A Mount Morgan miner, O'Brien was employed for close to three decades as a check inspector.

== See also ==
- List of Australia national rugby union players
