= Frank Reville =

- Full name: James Francis Reville
- Born: 14 August 1905 Brisbane, QLD, Australia
- Died: 27 April 1983 (aged 77)

Rugby union career
- Position: Flanker
Provincial / State sides
Years	Team	Apps	(Points)
1930–32	Queensland		
International career
Years	Team	Apps	(Points)
1931	Australia		

James Francis Reville (14 August 1905 – 27 April 1983) was an Australian international rugby union player.

Reville was born in Brisbane and educated at St Joseph's College, Gregory Terrace.

A Queensland junior cycling champion, Reville was active in first-class rugby during the early 1930s and played for Brisbane's Valleys club. He represented an Australian XV against the British Lions in 1930 and the following year was called up by the Wallabies for their tour of New Zealand, making three uncapped appearances as a loose forward.

== See also ==
- List of Australia national rugby union players
