= Allan Livermore =

- Full name: Allan Edward Livermore
- Born: 12 February 1919 Brisbane, Australia
- Died: 23 December 1956 (aged 37) Ashgrove, Brisbane, Australia

Rugby union career
- Position: Flanker
International career
| Years | Team | Apps | (Points) |
| 1946 | Australia | 2 | (2) |

Allan Edward Livermore (12 February 1919 — 23 December 1956) was an Australian rugby union international.

Livermore was born in Brisbane and attended New Farm State School.

A flanker, Livermore was a prolific goal-kicker and while playing for YMCA in 1946 set a Brisbane competition record season tally with 193 points. He made the Wallabies squad for that year's tour of New Zealand, where he was capped in Tests against the All Blacks in Dunedin and New Zealand Maori in Hamilton.

Livermore died aged 37 in 1956. His body was found under a bridge in Ashgrove after he had been reported missing several days earlier. He had a son Ross who became a prominent Queensland rugby league administrator.

== See also ==
- List of Australia national rugby union players
