= Gary Gainsford =

- Full name: Gary Edward Gainsford
- Born: 2 June 1955 (age 71) Sydney, NSW, Australia
- School: Hurstville Boys High School

Rugby union career
- Position: Halfback
International career
Years	Team	Apps	(Points)
1979	Australia		

Gary Edward Gainsford (born 2 June 1955) is an Australian former international rugby union player.

Gainsford was born in Sydney and educated at Hurstville Boys High School.

A halfback, Gainsford was a product of Oatley juniors and in 1975 made his first-grade debut for St. George. His Wallabies call up in 1979, to play against New Zealand, was considered a surprise as he had been playing in Sydney's second division with St. George and had limited representative experience. He replaced Rod Hauser on the bench for the one-off Test in Sydney, as back up for Peter Carson, but wasn't required to take the field. After over 100 first-grade appearances for St. George, Gainsford played for Adelaide club Brighton and was a South Australian interstate representative.

== See also ==
- List of Australia national rugby union players
