= Brad Girvan =

Australian rugby union international

- Full name: Bradford Geoffrey Girvan
- Born: 29 January 1962 (age 64) Canberra, Australia

Rugby union career
- Position: Centre
International career
Years	Team	Apps	(Points)
1988	Australia	1	(0)

Bradford Geoffrey Girvan (born 29 January 1962) is an Australian former rugby union international.

Born in Canberra, Girvan attended Dickson College and played first-grade for Northern Suburbs. He is the son of Neville Girvan, who was a leading rugby player for Ainslie in the 1960s.

Girvan, a centre, was an Australian under-21s representative and competed in a strong ACT team which performed strongly against touring Test sides. After gaining Wallabies selection for the 1988 tour of England, Scotland and Italy, he made his Test debut against England at Twickenham, as the outside centre.

== See also ==
- List of Australia national rugby union players
