= Don Strachan =

Australian rugby union international

- Full name: Donald John Strachan
- Born: 18 February 1929 (age 97) Orange, NSW, Australia
- School: Hurlstone Agricultural School
- Occupation: Farmer

Rugby union career
- Position: Prop
International career
| Years | Team | Apps | (Points) |
| 1955 | Australia | 2 | (0) |

Donald John Strachan (born 18 February 1929) is an Australian former rugby union international.

A native of Orange, Strachan was educated at Hurlstone Agricultural School.

Strachan, a front row forward, was a foundation player for the Orange Emus Rugby Club and toured New Zealand in 1954 with New South Wales Country. The following year, he returned to New Zealand as a member of the Wallabies touring party, playing as tighthead prop in the 2nd and 3rd Test matches against the All Blacks. He turned down further international opportunities in order to run the family farm, which had become his responsibility after his father retired.

== See also ==
- List of Australia national rugby union players
