= Glenn Nichols =

- Full name: Glenn Alexander Nichols
- Born: 29 November 1952 (age 73) Adelaide, Australia
- School: Chatswood High School

Rugby union career
- Position: Wing three–quarter
Provincial / State sides
| Years | Team | Apps | (Points) |
- New South Wales
International career
| Years | Team | Apps | (Points) |
| 1976 | Australia | | |

Glenn Alexander Nichols (born 29 November 1952) is an Australian former international rugby union player.

Nichols was born in Adelaide, but moved to Sydney at a young age and grew up in the Lower North Shore, attending Chatswood High School. He played junior rugby for Chatswood and his last year at school represented Combined High Schools on a tour of New Zealand. Initially a fullback, Nichols was developed into a specialist winger by his first grade club Gordon. He was unavailable for Gordon on Sundays due to his religious beliefs.

When Fiji toured Australia in 1976, Nichols made his New South Wales debut against the tourists and scored two tries, which helped earn him a Wallabies call up for the subsequent Test series. He was on the bench for all three internationals against the Fijians and never got to take the field.

Nichols was a member of Gordon's 1976 Shute Shield premiership–winning side and retired two seasons later.

== See also ==
- List of Australia national rugby union players
