= Norman Mayne =

- Full name: Norman Colburn Mayne
- Born: 30 August 1942 (age 84) Brisbane, QLD, Australia
- School: Brisbane Boys' College

Rugby union career
- Position: Halfback
Provincial / State sides
Years	Team	Apps	(Points)
	Queensland	18	
International career
Years	Team	Apps	(Points)
1965	Australia		

Norman Colburn Mayne (born 30 August 1942) is an Australian former rugby union player.

A diminutive halfback from Brisbane, Mayne learnt his rugby at Brisbane Boys' College, where he was a first XV player in 1959 and 1960, while also gaining GPS 1st team honours for cricket.

Mayne spent most of his first-grade career with the University of Queensland, after joining from Wests in 1964. He won three "A" grade premierships for the varsity team. In 1965, Mayne was a Wallabies reserve for a Test match against the Springboks at Lang Park and was a member of the Queensland team which undertook a tour of Fiji.

== See also ==
- List of Australia national rugby union players
