= Len Palfreyman =

- Full name: James Richard Leonard Palfreyman
- Born: 9 May 1905 Coogee, Sydney, Australia
- Died: 23 September 1973 (aged 68)
- School: Sydney Grammar School

Rugby union career
- Position: Flanker
International career
Years	Team	Apps	(Points)
1929–32	Australia	4	(0)

James Richard Leonard Palfreyman (9 May 1905 – 23 September 1973) was an Australian rugby union international.

Palfreyman was born in the Sydney suburb of Coogee and attended Sydney Grammar School.

A Randwick forward, Palfreyman was a tall line-out specialist, capped four times for the Wallabies. He was a member of the Wallabies team which historically swept the All Blacks 3–0 in 1929, although he had to surrender his place in the XV after the 1st Test due to the death of his father. Retiring after Randwick's 1934 premiership win, Palfreyman later coached the club's reserves side and served as a New South Wales state selector.

== See also ==
- List of Australia national rugby union players
