= Mark McInnes (rugby union) =

- Full name: Mark Antony McInnes
- Born: 6 July 1963 Canberra, ACT, Australia
- Died: 27 May 2020 (aged 56) Canberra, ACT, Australia
- School: St Edmund's College

Rugby union career
- Position: No. 8
International career
| Years | Team | Apps | (Points) |
| 1989 | Australia | | |

Mark Antony McInnes (6 July 1963 – 27 May 2020) was an Australian international rugby union player.

McInnes grew up in Canberra and attended St Edmund's College, earning ACT Schools representative honours during his three years with the 1st XV. He began playing for Easts in 1986 and during his second season was named the ACT's best and fairest representative player, before being promoted to the club captaincy in 1989.

A Wallabies representative on their 1989 tour of North American and France, McInnes made a total of four uncapped appearances, debuting in a win over the North American Wolverines. He was unable to displace Tim Gavin as the number eight for any of the Test matches and a serious knee injury the following year took him out of international reckoning.

== See also ==
- List of Australia national rugby union players
