= Jack Howard (rugby union) =

Australia international rugby union player

- Full name: John Howard
- Born: 20 March 1913 Nambour, QLD, Australia
- Died: 28 August 1979 (aged 66)

Rugby union career
- Position: Wing
International career
| Years | Team | Apps | (Points) |
| 1938 | Australia | 2 | (0) |

John Howard (20 March 1913 – 28 August 1979) was an Australian rugby union international.

Born in Nambour, Howard is a descendent of Edward Howard, 1st Baron Howard of Escrick. He was previously erroneously reported by historians and officials to have been an Indigenous Australian.

Howard was originally a Nambour rugby league player, before switching to rugby union in the mid-1930s.

A winger, Howard played his first-grade rugby in Brisbane for Bretts-Windsor and Brothers. He was capped twice by the Wallabies in 1938, against the All Blacks for Bledisloe Cup matches in Sydney and Brisbane. The Wallabies didn't play another Test match for eight years due to the war. He went back to Nambour in 1939 and returned to rugby league.

== See also ==
- List of Australia national rugby union players
