= Ernie Freeman (rugby union) =

Rugby player (1922–1977)

- Born: 7 November 1922 Sydney, Australia
- Died: 1 July 1977 (aged 54) Eastwood, Sydney, Australia
- Height: 6 ft 2 in (188 cm)

Rugby union career
- Position: Prop
International career
Years	Team	Apps	(Points)
1946	Australia	2	(0)

Ernie Freeman (7 November 1922 — 1 July 1977) was an Australian rugby union international.

A native of Sydney, Freeman played his rugby for Drummoyne, debuting in first-grade in 1941.

Freeman, a forward, began his representative career as a lock in the New South Wales team. He gained a place on the Wallabies squad for the 1946 tour of New Zealand after playing as a prop for "The Rest" in the selection trials. In the 1st All Blacks Test at Carisbrook, Freeman came onto the field as a replacement prop for the injured Eric Tweedale, to gain his first Wallabies cap. He was in the starting XV for the Test against NZ Maori, again as a prop.

== See also ==
- List of Australia national rugby union players
