= George Pearson (rugby union) =

- Full name: George Arthur Pearson
- Born: 23 August 1916 Melbourne, Australia
- Died: 3 January 1990 (aged 73)
- Height: 177.5 cm (5 ft 10 in)
- Weight: 85 kg (187 lb)

Rugby union career
- Position: Prop
International career
Years	Team	Apps	(Points)
1939	Australia		

George Arthur Pearson (23 August 1916 – 3 January 1990) was an Australian international rugby union player.

Born in Melbourne, Pearson attended Glenroy Primary School and Essendon High School. He grew up playing Australian rules football, but switched to rugby during his studies at the University of Melbourne, having been unsuccessful in making their football team. In 1937, Pearson represented Victoria against the touring Springboks.

Pearson won a place as a prop on the Wallabies 1939–40 tour of Britain and Ireland, as one of four Victoria–based players. The tour however ended before they had a chance to play a match in England, on account of the war. He played against a Ceylon XV on the journey home, which would be his only appearance in national colours.

An Anglican minister, Pearson was based in Tanganyika during the 1940s, helping to set up schools for local children.

== See also ==
- List of Australia national rugby union players
