= Herb Trousdale =

- Full name: Andrew Herbert Trousdale
- Born: 7 November 1900 Sydney, NSW, Australia
- Died: 5 January 1957 (aged 56)
- Height: 178 cm (5 ft 10 in)
- Weight: 76 kg (168 lb)

Rugby union career
- Position: Centre
International career
Years	Team	Apps	(Points)
1923	Australia		

Andrew Herbert Trousdale (7 November 1900 – 5 January 1957) was an Australian international rugby union player.

Trousdale was born in Sydney and educated at North Sydney Intermediate High School.

A sturdy centre, Trousdale gained selection to an inexperienced New South Wales squad for the 1923 New Zealand tour. The team was a de facto Wallabies side and have retrospectively been recognised as such. He appeared in the tour opener against Wellington-Manawatū, but spent most of the tour sidelined, and didn't feature against New Zealand.

Trousdale played his club rugby for Eastern Suburbs, Mosman and North Sydney.

== See also ==
- List of Australia national rugby union players
