= Harry Bartley =

- Full name: Harold Bartley
- Born: 5 January 1906 Gunnedah, NSW, Australia
- Died: 20 April 1968 (aged 62)
- Height: 5 ft 7 in (170 cm)
- Weight: 72 kg (159 lb)
- School: North Sydney Boys High School

Rugby union career
- Position: Fly-half
Provincial / State sides
Years	Team	Apps	(Points)
1928–30	New South Wales	11	(36)
International career
Years	Team	Apps	(Points)
1928	Australia		

Harold Bartley (5 January 1906 – 20 April 1968) was an Australian international rugby union player.

Hailing from Gunnedah, New South Wales, Bartley underwent his secondary education in Sydney, attending North Sydney Boys High School. He was known by the nickname "Tibby".

Bartley, a fly-half, played for Western Suburbs and Northern Suburbs during his career. He visited New Zealand with New South Wales in 1928, playing three tour matches, as part of what is now recognised as a national representative team.

== See also ==
- List of Australia national rugby union players
