= Pat Cooper (rugby union) =

- Full name: Patrick Charles Hay Cooper
- Born: 28 October 1939 (age 87) Hong Kong
- School: The King's School, Parramatta

Rugby union career
- Position: Halfback
Provincial / State sides
| Years | Team | Apps | (Points) |
| 1965–67 | New South Wales | 3 | (0) |
International career
| Years | Team | Apps | (Points) |
| 1966 | Australia | | |

Patrick Charles Hay Cooper (born 28 October 1939) is an Australian former international rugby union player.

Cooper was born in Hong Kong and began playing rugby union while a schoolboy at The King's School, Parramatta.

A Parramatta halfback, Cooper had his representative opportunities limited due to Ken Catchpole's regular presence in Waratahs and Wallabies lineups. He made three appearances for his state and gained his first Wallabies call up in 1965, as a reserve against the Springboks in Sydney, although he had to withdraw with a leg injury. In 1966, Cooper was a Wallabies reserve against the British Lions in Brisbane.

== See also ==
- List of Australia national rugby union players
