= Phil Clark (rugby union) =

- Full name: Phillip Andrew Clark
- Born: 27 September 1910 Mt. Chambers, QLD, Australia
- Died: 11 October 1972 (aged 62)
- School: St Joseph's, Gregory Terrace
- University: University of Queensland

Rugby union career
- Position: Utility back
Provincial / State sides
Years	Team	Apps	(Points)
1931–33	Queensland		
International career
Years	Team	Apps	(Points)
1931	Australia		

Phillip Andrew Clark (27 September 1910 – 11 October 1972) was an Australian international rugby union player.

Born in Mount Chalmers, Queensland, Clark was educated at St Joseph's College, Gregory Terrace, before undertaking tertiary studies at the University of Queensland, where he competed on the varsity team.

Clark, a utility back, toured New Zealand with the Wallabies in 1931. He featured in two uncapped tour matches, which included a two-try performance in a win over Waikato-King Country, but was unused against the All Blacks.

== See also ==
- List of Australia national rugby union players
