= Geoff Steanes =

- Full name: Geoffrey Ellington Steanes
- Born: 21 June 1898 Sydney, Australia
- Died: 4 November 1938 (aged 40)

Rugby union career
- Position: Forward
Provincial / State sides
Years	Team	Apps	(Points)
- New South Wales
International career
Years	Team	Apps	(Points)
1921	Australia		

Geoffrey Ellington Steanes (21 June 1898 – 4 November 1938) was an Australian international rugby union player.

Steanes was born in Sydney and educated at Mosman Public School.

A sturdy forward, Steanes played for North Sydney and was a member of the New South Wales Waratahs team which toured New Zealand in 1921, as a late addition to the squad. The Waratahs were Australia's sole representative team of the time, so the internationals against the All Blacks have been retrospectively granted international status. Nonetheless, Steanes only featured in three minor matches, against Bay of Plenty, Poverty Bay and West Coast.

Steanes was a member of the North Narrabeen Surf Club. While staying at his beachside cottage on weekends, Steanes would come to the assistance of any swimmer in distress and is credited with having saved several lives over the years.

== See also ==
- List of Australia national rugby union players
