= Paul Cornish =

Australian rugby union international

- Full name: Paul William Cornish
- Born: 17 January 1965 (age 61) Canberra, ACT, Australia

Rugby union career
- Position: Centre
International career
Years	Team	Apps	(Points)
1990	Australia	3	(4)

Paul William Cornish (born 17 January 1965) is an Australian former rugby union international.

A native of Canberra, Cornish attended Hawker College and played for the Canberra Royals.

Cornish, an ACT representative since 1985, gained his first Wallabies call up for the 1988 tour of Europe, but injuries limited his opportunities and he had to wait two years for his first Test cap.

Capped three times in 1990, Cornish was a starting centre in two home Tests against France, replacing an injured Tim Horan, then toured New Zealand and faced the All Blacks in Christchurch.

Cornish suffered a near career ending broken neck while playing for Australia ‘B’ in 1991, but returned to ACT colours and also had a stint in Japan with Tokyo-based club Meiji Seimei.

== See also ==
- List of Australia national rugby union players
