= Frederick Kerr (rugby union) =

- Full name: Frederick Raymond Kerr
- Born: 25 April 1918 St. Kilda, Melbourne, Australia
- Died: 23 April 1941 (aged 22) Greece
- School: Melbourne High School
- Occupation: Electrical engineer

Rugby union career
- Position: No. 8
International career
Years	Team	Apps	(Points)
1938	Australia	1	(0)

Frederick Raymond Kerr (25 April 1918 — 23 April 1941) was an Australian rugby union international.

A Melbourne High School product, Kerr was an Australian rules footballer while growing up in Melbourne and had a trial with VFL club St Kilda. He started playing first-grade rugby for Power House in 1937 and the following year was capped for the Wallabies in a Bledisloe Cup match against the All Blacks at the Sydney Cricket Ground, as a number eight.

Kerr served as a Lance Bombardier with the 2/2nd Field Regiment, AIF, in World War II. He was involved in the Libya campaign and was later killed in action during fighting in occupied Greece in April, 1941, at the age of 22.

== See also ==
- List of Australia national rugby union players
