= Roy Lindsay =

Rugby player (1905–1972)

- Full name: Roy Thomas George Lindsay
- Born: 2 April 1905 Toowoomba, QLD, Australia
- Died: 9 August 1972 (aged 67)

Rugby union career
- Position: Fullback / Wing
International career
Years	Team	Apps	(Points)
1932	Australia	1	(0)

Roy Thomas George Lindsay (2 April 1905 — 9 August 1972) was an Australian rugby union international.

Educated at Toowoomba East State School, Lindsay played rugby league for the famed "Galloping Clydesdales", a Toowoomba representative team which for a period in the mid-1920s had many of the country's best players.

Lindsay, a fullback and winger, switched to rugby union in the early 1930s. He gained his solitary Wallabies cap in the 3rd Test of the 1932 Bledisloe Cup against the All Blacks at the Sydney Cricket Ground, playing on the right wing.

== See also ==
- List of Australia national rugby union players
