= Gordon Walker (rugby union) =

- Full name: Gordon Cordeaux Smart Walker
- Born: 29 December 1900 Sydney, Australia
- Died: 14 February 1958 (aged 57)
- School: Sydney Grammar School

Rugby union career
- Position: Centre / Fullback
Provincial / State sides
Years	Team	Apps	(Points)
- New South Wales
International career
Years	Team	Apps	(Points)
1921	Australia		

Gordon Cordeaux Smart Walker (29 December 1900 – 14 February 1958) was an Australian international rugby union player most active during the 1920s.

Born in Sydney, Walker was the son of a NSW representative of the 1880s and attended Sydney Grammar School.

Walker was mainly utilised as a centre three–quarter or fullback. He was a particularly light player, weighing 67 kg at the time he toured New Zealand in 1921, as a member of the NSW Waratahs. This has retrospectively come to be recognised as a Wallabies touring side, as the Waratahs were the country's only representative side of the time. Restricted to the non international fixtures, Walker didn't get any opportunities on tour to play as a centre and instead was used on a wing when not required as a fullback. He played his club rugby for Eastern Suburbs.

== See also ==
- List of Australia national rugby union players
