= Sean Spence (rugby union) =

Australian rugby union player (born 1941)

- Full name: John Stewart Spence
- Born: 29 September 1941 (age 85) Durban, South Africa
- Height: 5 ft 11 in (180 cm)
- Weight: 12 st 10l lb
- School: St. Ignatius' College, Riverview
- University: University of Sydney

Rugby union career
- Position: Fullback
Provincial / State sides
Years	Team	Apps	(Points)
1963	New South Wales	4	
International career
Years	Team	Apps	(Points)
1962	Australia		

John Stewart "Sean" Spence (born 29 September 1941) is an Australian former international rugby union player.

The son of a RAMC Surgeon, Spence was born in Durban, South Africa, during World War II. He lived in England for a period in his youth, then attended Saint Ignatius' College, Riverview, where he picked up rugby. While pursuing further studies, Spence won back to back premierships at Sydney University, in 1961 and 1962.

Spence served as an understudy for Wallabies fullback Jim Lenehan on the 1962 tour of New Zealand. A twisted ankle suffered in a training drill kept him sidelined for the first half of the tour and he featured in only four uncapped fixtures, debuting in the match against West Coast-Buller.

After a stint with Manly, Spence played for London Irish from 1964 to 1966, while undergoing airline pilot training in England, after which he retired from the sport.

== See also ==
- List of Australia national rugby union players
