= Wal Ives =

- Born: Walter Norman Ives; 10 November 1906 Sydney
- Died: c. 1983

Rugby union career
- Position: lock
International career
| Years | Team | Apps | (Points) |
| 1926–29 | Wallabies | 5 | (0) |

Walter Norman "Wal" Ives (10 November 1906 – c. 1983) was a rugby union player who represented Australia.

Ives, a lock, was born in Sydney and claimed a total of 5 international rugby caps for Australia.
