= Dudley Suttor =

Australia international rugby union player (1892–1962)

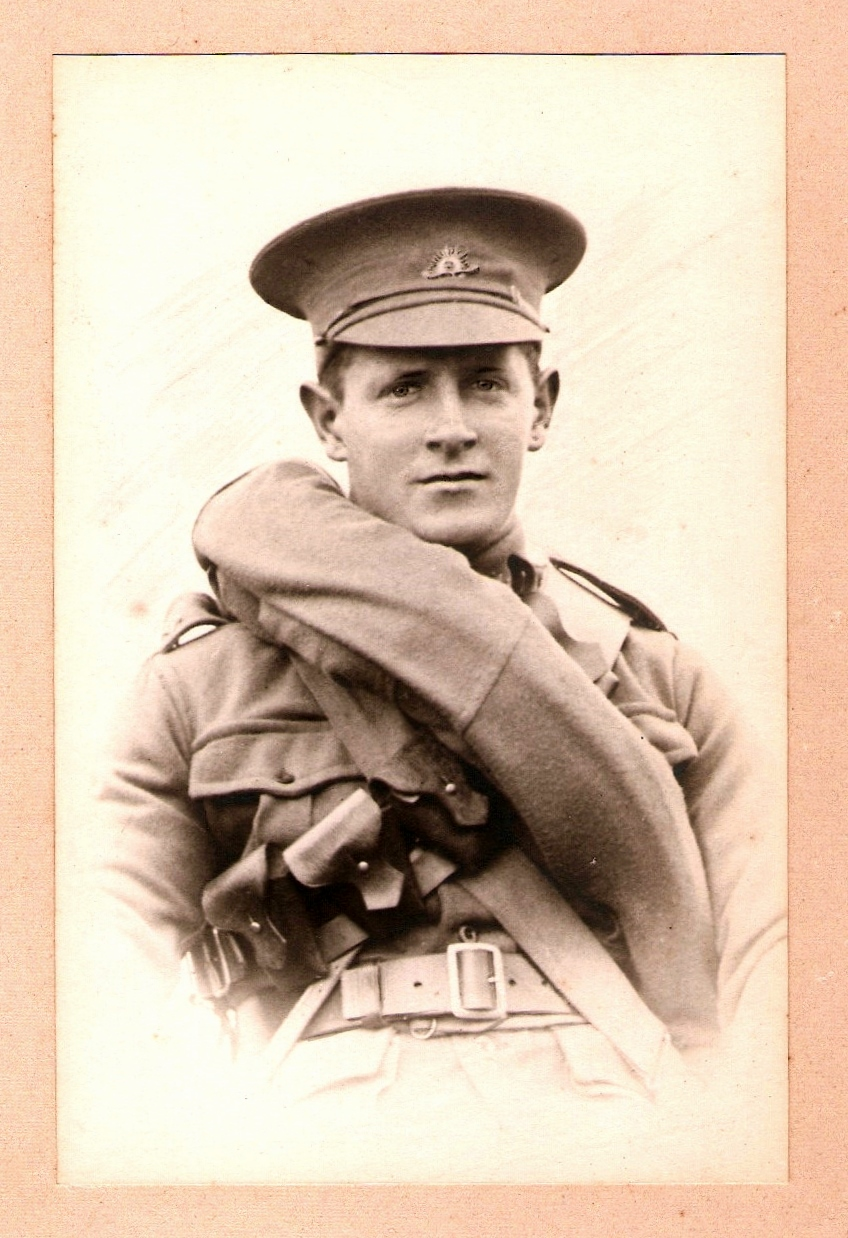
- Born: Dudley Colin Suttor; 10 April 1892 Cowra, New South Wales "Warrangong", Koorawatha (near Cowra)
- Died: 15 April 1962 (aged 70) Dee Why, NSW, Australia
- School: Shore School, Sydney
- Occupation: Fruit Grower

Rugby union career
- Position: wing
International career
Years	Team	Apps	(Points)
1913	Wallabies	3	(9)

Dudley Colin Suttor (10 April 1892 – 15 April 1962) was a rugby union player who represented Australia.

Suttor, a wing, was born in Cowra, New South Wales and claimed a total of 3 international rugby caps for Australia.
