= Jan McShane =

Australia international rugby union player (1910–1975)

- Born: Jan Melville Swain McShane; 11 December 1910 Tamworth, New South Wales
- Died: c. 1975

Rugby union career
- Position: scrum-half
International career
Years	Team	Apps	(Points)
1937	Wallabies	2	(0)

Jan Melville Swain McShane (11 December 1910 – c. 1975) was a rugby union player who represented Australia.

McShane, a scrum-half, was born in Tamworth, New South Wales and claimed a total of 2 international rugby caps for Australia.
