= Roy Cooney =

- Born: Royal Charles Cooney; 8 November 1896 North Sydney, New South Wales
- Died: 27 August 1962 (aged 65)

Rugby union career
- Position: centre
International career
Years	Team	Apps	(Points)
1922	Wallabies	1	(3)

Royal Charles Cooney (8 November 1896 – 27 August 1962) was a rugby union player who represented Australia.

Cooney, a centre, was born in North Sydney, New South Wales and claimed 1 international rugby cap for Australia.
