= Arthur Erby =

Australian rugby union player

- Born: Arthur Brian Erby; 27 September 1902 Sydney
- Died: 3 March 1972

Rugby union career
- Position: prop
International career
Years	Team	Apps	(Points)
1923–25	Wallabies	5	(0)

Arthur Brian Erby (27 September 1902 – 3 March 1972) was a rugby union player who represented Australia.

Erby, a prop, was born in Sydney and claimed a total of 5 international rugby caps for Australia.
