= Wal Rigney =

- Born: Walter Alfred Rigney; 1 January 1898 Sydney
- Died: c. 1965

Rugby union career
- Position: flanker
International career
Years	Team	Apps	(Points)
1925–26	Wallabies	3	(0)

Walter Alfred Rigney (1 January 1898 – c. 1965) was a rugby union player who represented Australia. Rigney, a flanker, was born in Sydney and claimed a total of 3 international rugby caps for Australia.
