= Alf Rainbow =

- Born: Alfred Ernest Rainbow; 1 April 1900 London
- Died: 17 December 1963 (aged 63) Sydney

Rugby union career
- Position: fly-half
International career
Years	Team	Apps	(Points)
1925–25	Wallabies	1	(0)

Alfred Ernest "Alf" Rainbow (1 April 1900 – 17 December 1963) was a rugby union player who represented Australia.

Rainbow, a fly-half, was born in London and claimed 1 international rugby cap for Australia.
