= Reg Foote =

Australian rugby union player

- Born: Reginald Hardwick Foote; 1904 Ipswich, Queensland
- Died: 1979 Sydney
- School: Ipswich Grammar School
- University: University of Sydney
- Occupation: Dentist

Rugby union career
- Position: wing
International career
Years	Team	Apps	(Points)
1924–26	Wallabies	3	(0)

Reginald H. "Reg" Foote (born c. 1904) was a rugby union player who represented Australia.

Foote, a wing, was born in Sydney and claimed a total of 3 international rugby caps for Australia.
