= Montagu Massy-Westropp =

Montague Massy-Westropp
- Born: Montague Massy-Westropp; 7 August 1891 Temora, New South Wales
- Died: 2 July 1974 New South Wales
- School: Kings school
- Occupation(s): stock and station agent, farmer

Rugby union career
- Position: wing
International career
| Years | Team | Apps | (Points) |
| 1914 | Wallabies | 1 | (0) |

Montague Massy-Westropp (c. 1891 – c. 1974) was a rugby union player who represented Australia.

Massy-Westropp, a wing, was born in Temora, New South Wales and claimed 1 international rugby cap for Australia.
