= Stephen Slater =

- Born: Stephen Hazelton Slater; 1885 Manly, New South Wales
- Died: 1 February 1948 (aged 62)

Rugby union career
International career
Years	Team	Apps	(Points)
1910–1910	Wallabies	1	(0)

Stephen Hazelton Slater (1885 – 1 February 1948) was a rugby union player who represented Australia.

Slater, a prop, was born in Manly, New South Wales and claimed 1 international rugby cap for Australia.
