= Alf Smairl =

Australian rugby union player

- Born: Alfred M. G. Smairl; 16 January 1907 Paddington, New South Wales, Australia

Rugby union career
- Position: wing
International career
Years	Team	Apps	(Points)
1928	Wallabies	3	(3)

Alfred M. G. Smairl (born 16 January 1907) was a rugby union player who represented Australia.

Smairl, a wing, was born in Paddington, New South Wales, and earned three international rugby caps for Australia.
