= Joe Thorn =

- Born: Albert Matthew Thorn; 18 March 1899 Manly, New South Wales

Rugby union career
- Position: flanker
International career
Years	Team	Apps	(Points)
1921–22	Wallabies	6	(0)

Albert Matthew "Joe" Thorn (born 18 March 1899) was a rugby union player who represented Australia.

Thorn, a flanker, was born in Manly, New South Wales and claimed a total of 6 international rugby caps for Australia.
