= Harry Hamalainen =

Australian rugby union player (1903–1975)

Personal information
- Born: Harold Arvit Hamalainen; 20 June 1903 Brisbane, Queensland, Australia
- Died: 20 May 1975 (aged 71)

Playing information
- Position: Second-row
Club
Years	Team	Pld	T	G	FG	P
1925–26	Brisbane Firsts	3				0

Rugby union career
- Position: Lock
International career
Years	Team	Apps	(Points)
1929	Australia	3	(0)

Harold Arvit Hamalainen (20 June 1903 – 20 May 1975) was an Australian international rugby union player. Hamalainen played as a lock and claimed a total of three international rugby caps for Australia. He also achieved success in rugby league at an amateur level, representing Brisbane Firsts in 1925–26.

Born in Brisbane, Queensland, Hamalainen was of Finnish descent and a truck driver by profession. During World War II, he enlisted in the Second Australian Imperial Force (2nd AIF) in 1940, before being discharged in 1943.
