= Robert Potter (rugby union) =

- Born: Robert Thomas Potter c. 1942 Toowoomba, Queensland

Rugby union career
- Position: wing
International career
Years	Team	Apps	(Points)
1961	Wallabies	1	(0)

Robert Thomas Potter (born c. 1942) was a rugby union player who represented Australia.

Potter, a wing, was born in Toowoomba, Queensland and claimed 1 international rugby cap for Australia. Robert Thomas Potter, born at Toowoomba, attended Downlands College, Rugby nursery of one of Australia's greatest centres, Tim Horan. Potter was a tall, robust and courageous wing three-quarter. As a law student he joined the Queensland University Club, and soon won selection in the State XV. He played just one Test match - against Fiji, in Sydney on 17 June 1961, when Australia won by 26 points to 14. His selection surprised some commentators, but he played soundly. However, he was replaced in the next Test, played in Melbourne, by a Victorian representative, Adrian Turnbull, whose own Test career was just as brief.
