= Roland Raymond =

- Born: Roland Lionel Raymond; 12 January 1899
- Died: 29 January 1964 (aged 65)
- School: Sydney Grammar School

Rugby union career
- Position: wing
International career
Years	Team	Apps	(Points)
1920–23	Wallabies	13	(30)

Roland Lionel Raymond (12 January 1899 – 29 January 1964) was a rugby union player who represented Australia.

Raymond, a wing, claimed a total of 13 international rugby caps for Australia.
