= Harry Bryant =

Australian rugby union player (1906–1963)

- Born: Harry Evers Bryant; January 9, 1906 Sydney
- Died: 17 November 1963 (aged 57) Cronulla, New South Wales
- School: Newington College

Rugby union career
- Position: Number eight
International career
Years	Team	Apps	(Points)
1925	Wallabies	3	(0)

Harry Evers Bryant (9 January 1906 – 17 November 1963) was a rugby union player who represented Australia. Bryant, a number eight, was born in Sydney and claimed a total of 3 international rugby caps for Australia in 1925. He attended Newington College (1917–1923). Bryant died in Cronulla, New South Wales, aged 57.
