= Bill Hammon =

- Born: John Douglas Campbell Hammon; 3 March 1914 Invercargill, New Zealand
- Died: 12 January 2004 (aged 89)

Rugby union career
- Position: centre
International career
Years	Team	Apps	(Points)
1937	Wallabies	1	(0)

John Douglas Campbell "Bill" Hammon (3 March 1914 – 12 January 2004) was a rugby union player who represented Australia.

Hammon, a centre, was born in Invercargill, New Zealand and claimed 1 international rugby cap for Australia.
