= Trevor Stegman =

- Born: Trevor Robert Stegman; 25 June 1946 Sydney

Rugby union career
- Position: centre
International career
Years	Team	Apps	(Points)
1973	Wallabies	2	(0)

Trevor Robert Stegman (born 25 June 1946) was a rugby union player who represented Australia.

Stegman, a centre, was born in Sydney and claimed a total of 2 international rugby caps for Australia.
