= Norm Smith (rugby union) =

- Born: Norman Cecil Smith c. 1899
- Died: c. 1971

Rugby union career
- Position: wing
International career
Years	Team	Apps	(Points)
1922–25	Wallabies	6	(6)

Norman Cecil Smith (c. 1899 – c. 1971) was a rugby union player who represented Australia.

Smith, a wing, claimed a total of 6 international rugby caps for Australia.
