= Robert Anderson (rugby union) =

Australian rugby union player, born 1900

- Born: Robert Peter Anderson; 1900 Temora, New South Wales
- Died: c. 1979

Rugby union career
- Position: centre
International career
Years	Team	Apps	(Points)
1925	Wallabies	1	(0)

Robert Peter Anderson (1900 – c. 1979) was a rugby union player who represented Australia.

Anderson, a centre, was born in Temora, New South Wales and claimed 1 international rugby cap for Australia.
