= Arthur Jamieson =

- Born: Arthur E. Jamieson c. 1901 Sydney

Rugby union career
- Position: ?
International career
Years	Team	Apps	(Points)
1925	Wallabies	1	(0)

Arthur E. Jamieson (born c. 1901) was a rugby union player who represented Australia.

Jamieson, was born in Sydney and claimed one international rugby cap for Australia.
