= Bruce Wells (rugby union) =

Australia international rugby union player

- Born: Bruce George Wells; 4 June 1937 (age 89) Orange, New South Wales

Rugby union career
- Position: fly-half
International career
| Years | Team | Apps | (Points) |
| 1958 | Wallabies | 1 | (0) |

Bruce George Wells (born 4 June 1937) was a rugby union player who represented Australia.

Wells, a fly-half, was born in Orange, New South Wales and claimed 1 international rugby cap for Australia.
