= Arthur Mayne =

- Born: Arthur Vincent Mayne c. 1898 Sydney
- Died: c. 1974

Rugby union career
- Position: wing
International career
Years	Team	Apps	(Points)
1920–22	Wallabies	4	(0)

Arthur Vincent Mayne (c. 1898 – c. 1974) was a rugby union player who represented Australia.

Mayne, a wing, was born in Sydney and claimed a total of 4 international rugby caps for Australia.
