= Paul Costello (rugby union) =

Australian rugby union player

- Born: Paul Patrick Scott Costello; 26 April 1927 Toowoomba, Queensland
- Died: 15 March 2008 (aged 80) Bundaberg, Australia

Rugby union career
- Position: fullback
International career
Years	Team	Apps	(Points)
1950	Wallabies	1	(0)

Paul Patrick Scott Costello (26 April 1927 – 15 March 2008) was a rugby union player who represented Australia.

Costello, a fullback, was born in Toowoomba, Queensland, and claimed one international rugby cap for Australia.

== Early life and education ==
Paul Patrick Scott Costello was born on 26 April 1927 in Toowoomba.

Costello was educated at St. Mary's Christian Brothers College in Toowoomba, where he completed his early schooling. During the years of World War II, he developed his athletic abilities through rugby league, representing the premiership-winning All Whites team in Toowoomba. After the war, he transitioned to rugby union.
