= Basil Lucas =

- Born: Basil C. Lucas circa 1879 Brisbane, Queensland

Rugby union career
- Position: flanker
International career
| Years | Team | Apps | (Points) |
| 1905 | Australia | 1 | (0) |

Basil C. Lucas (born c. 1879) was a rugby union player who represented Australia.

Lucas, a flanker, was born in Brisbane, Queensland and claimed one international rugby cap for Australia, playing against New Zealand, at Dunedin, on 2 September 1905.
