= Roo Dorr =

- Born: Rudolf William Dorr; 29 June 1909 Melbourne, Victoria
- Died: 28 October 1961 (aged 52)

Rugby union career
- Position: Wing
International career
| Years | Team | Apps | (Points) |
| 1936–37 | Wallabies | 2 | (0) |

Rudolf William "Roo" Dorr (29 June 1909 – 28 October 1961) was a rugby union player who represented Australia.

Dorr, a wing, was born in Melbourne, Victoria and claimed a total of 2 international rugby caps for Australia.
