= Clive Farquhar =

Australian rugby player

- Born: Clive Raymond Farquhar c. 1896 Sydney
- Died: c. 1941
- School: The King’s School

Rugby union career
- Position: centre
International career
Years	Team	Apps	(Points)
1920	Wallabies	1	(0)

Clive Raymond Farquhar (c. 1896 – c. 1941) was a rugby union player who represented Australia.

Farquhar, a centre, was born in Sydney and claimed 1 international rugby cap for Australia.
