= Irving Ormiston =

Australia international rugby union player (1895–1969)

- Born: Irving William Leonard Ormiston; 19 June 1895 Cowra, New South Wales
- Died: 29 August 1969 (aged 74)

Rugby union career
- Position: flanker
International career
Years	Team	Apps	(Points)
1920	Wallabies	3	(0)

Irving William Leonard Ormiston (19 June 1895 – 29 August 1969) was a rugby union player who represented Australia.

Ormiston, a flanker, was born in Cowra, New South Wales and claimed a total of 3 international rugby caps for Australia.
