= Bob Westfield =

- Born: Robert E. Westfield; 26 May 1907 Hunterville, New Zealand
- Died: 7 June 1970 (aged 63) Sydney, Australia

Rugby union career
- Position: Fullback
International career
| Years | Team | Apps | (Points) |
| 1928–29 | Wallabies | 6 | (0) |

Robert E. "Bob" Westfield (26 May 1907 – 7 June 1970) was a New Zealand-born rugby union player who represented Australia.

Westfield, a fullback, was born in Hunterville and claimed a total of 6 international rugby caps for Australia.
