= Allen Munsie =

Australia international rugby union player (1906–1976)

Allan Munsie
- Born: Allan Coventry Munsie; 30 September 1906 Guyra, New South Wales
- Died: c. 1976

Rugby union career
- Position: flanker
International career
Years	Team	Apps	(Points)
1928	Wallabies	1	(0)

Allan Coventry Munsie (30 September 1906 – c. 1976) was a rugby union player who represented Australia.

Munsie, a flanker, was born in Guyra, New South Wales and claimed 1 international rugby cap for Australia.
