= Bot Stanley =

Australia international rugby union player (1900–1961)

- Born: Ronald Gordon Stanley c. 1900 Bathurst, New South Wales
- Died: c. 1961

Rugby union career
- Position: centre
International career
Years	Team	Apps	(Points)
1921–24	Wallabies	14	(53)

Ronald Gordon "Bot" Stanley (c. 1900 – c. 1961) was a rugby union player who represented Australia.

Stanley, a centre, was born in Bathurst, New South Wales and claimed a total of 14 international rugby caps for Australia.
