= Henry Pigott (rugby union) =

Australia international rugby union player (1899–1981)

- Born: Henry Robert Pigott; 25 May 1899 Blayney, New South Wales
- Died: 21 July 1981 Pennant Hills, New South Wales

Rugby union career
International career
Years	Team	Apps	(Points)
1922	Wallabies	1	(0)

Henry Robert Pigott (c. 1899 – c. 1981) was a rugby union player who represented Australia.

Pigott claimed 1 international rugby cap for Australia.
