= Jack Bonner =

- Born: Jack E. A. Bonner

Rugby union career
- Position: lock
International career
Years	Team	Apps	(Points)
1922–24	Wallabies	8	(0)

Jack E.A. Bonner was a rugby union player who represented Australia.

Bonner, a lock, claimed a total of 8 international rugby caps for Australia.
