= Leo Reynolds =

Australia international rugby union player (1888–1957)

- Born: Lionel John Reynolds circa 1888 Cumnock, New South Wales
- Died: circa 1957

Rugby union career
- Position: lock
International career
Years	Team	Apps	(Points)
1910	Wallabies	2	(0)

Lionel John "Leo" Reynolds ( c. 1888 – c. 1957) was a rugby union player who represented Australia.

Reynolds, a lock, was born in Cumnock, New South Wales and claimed a total of 2 international rugby caps for Australia.
