= William Canniffe =

- Born: William Denis Canniffe; 1 April 1885 Queensland, Australia
- Died: 25 September 1956 (aged 71) Queensland, Australia

Rugby union career
- Position: lock
International career
Years	Team	Apps	(Points)
1907	Wallabies	1	(0)

William Denis Canniffe (1 April 1885 – 25 September 1956) was a rugby union player who represented Australia.

Canniffe, a lock, claimed 1 international rugby cap for Australia.
