= Larry Wogan =

Australia international rugby union player

- Born: Lawrence William Wogan; 18 September 1890 Hokitika
- Died: August 1979 Sydney

Rugby union career
- Position: centre
International career
Years	Team	Apps	(Points)
1913–24	Wallabies	22	(14)

Lawrence William Wogan (18 September 1890 – August 1979) was a rugby union player who represented Australia.

Wogan, a centre, was born in Hokitika and claimed a total of 22 international rugby caps for Australia.

== See also ==
- 1912 Australia rugby union tour of Canada and the United States
