= Dwayne Vignes =

- Full name: Dwayne Alan Vignes
- Born: 7 July 1962 (age 64) Sydney, NSW, Australia
- School: Holroyd High School

Rugby union career
- Position: Wing
International career
Years	Team	Apps	(Points)
1987	Australia		

Dwayne Alan Vignes (born 7 July 1962) is an Australian former rugby union player.

Vignes was a product of Sydney's Greystanes club and attended Holroyd High School.

A winger, Vignes left Sydney for Coffs Harbour and earned NSW Country selection at the age of 21. He was capped 27 times for the NSW Waratahs, first making the team in 1985 against the touring Canadians. In 1986, Vignes scored three tries in two Waratahs matches against Queensland and was set for a Wallabies berth in that year's Test against France in Sydney, until an injury to Brett Papworth caused a rethink of the team composition. He won a call up to the Wallabies reserves bench the following year for the one-off Test against the All Blacks at Concord Oval, but never got the take the field.

Vignes scored an unusual try, coined "Gallipoli", playing for NSW Country against the 1989 British Lions, running over the top of the scrum in a move dreamt up by coach Daryl Haberecht. The try was disallowed by the referee, who reversed his decision when the Lions players gave Vignes some rough treatment after he scored.

Retiring in 2001, Vignes became a coach and led the SCU Marlins to the 2017 first-grade premiership.
