= Geoffrey Wyld =

- Born: Geoffrey H. G. Wyld c. 1894 Balgowlah, New South Wales

Rugby union career
- Position: lock
International career
Years	Team	Apps	(Points)
1920	Wallabies	1	(0)

Geoffrey H. G. Wyld (born c. 1894) was a rugby union player who represented Australia.

Wyld, a lock, was born in Balgowlah, New South Wales and claimed 1 international rugby cap for Australia.
