= Danie Erasmus =

Australian rugby union player

- Born: Daniel Jacobus Erasmus; 11 December 1899 Pretoria
- Died: c. 1975

Rugby union career
- Position: Wing
International career
Years	Team	Apps	(Points)
1923	Wallabies	2	(3)

Daniel Jacobus "Danie" Erasmus (11 December 1899 – c. 1975) was a rugby union player who represented Australia.

Erasmus, a wing, was born in Pretoria and won two international rugby caps for Australia.
