= John Pym (rugby union, born c. 1900) =

Australian rugby union footballer (born c. 1900)

- Born: John Frederick Pym c. 1900 Sydney

Rugby union career
- Position: wing
International career
Years	Team	Apps	(Points)
1923	Wallabies	1	(0)

John Frederick Pym (born c. 1900) was a rugby union player who represented Australia.

Pym, a wing, was born in Sydney and claimed 1 international rugby cap for Australia.
