= Don Telford =

- Born: Donald G. Telford c. 1902 Manly, New South Wales
- Died: c. 1980

Rugby union career
- Position: lock
International career
Years	Team	Apps	(Points)
1926	Wallabies	1	(0)

Donald G. Telford (c. 1902 – c. 1980) was a rugby union player who represented Australia.

Telford, a lock, was born in Manly, New South Wales and claimed 1 international rugby cap for Australia.
