= Peter James (rugby union) =

Australian rugby union player (1935–2021)

- Born: Peter Michael James; 14 December 1935 Brisbane, Queensland, Australia
- Died: 26 June 2021 (aged 85)

Rugby union career
- Position: centre
International career
| Years | Team | Apps | (Points) |
| 1958 | Wallabies | 2 | (0) |

Peter Michael James (14 December 1935 – 26 June 2021) was an Australian rugby union player who represented the national team.

James, a centre, was born in Brisbane, Queensland and claimed a total of 2 international rugby caps for Australia. He died on 26 June 2021, at the age of 85.
