= Ernie Ritchie =

Australian rugby union player (c.1898–??)

- Born: Ernest V. Ritchie c. 1898 Sydney

Rugby union career
- Position: prop
International career
Years	Team	Apps	(Points)
1924–25	Wallabies	4	(0)

Ernest V. "Ernie" Ritchie (born c. 1898) was a rugby union player who represented Australia.

Ritchie, a prop, was born in Sydney and claimed a total of 4 international rugby caps for Australia.
