= Stuart McLaren (rugby union) =

Australian rugby union footballer

- Born: Stuart D. McLaren c. 1902 Sydney

Rugby union career
- Position: wing
International career
Years	Team	Apps	(Points)
1926	Wallabies	1	(0)

Stuart D. McLaren (born c. 1902) was a rugby union player who represented Australia.

McLaren, a wing, was born in Sydney and claimed one international rugby cap for Australia.
