= Norm Mingay =

- Born: Norman Mingay; 11 July 1899 Sydney
- Died: 9 September 1955 (aged 56)

Rugby union career
- Position: scrum-half
International career
Years	Team	Apps	(Points)
1920–23	Wallabies	7	(20)

Norman "Norm" Mingay (11 July 1899 – 9 September 1955) was a rugby union player who represented Australia.

Mingay, a scrum-half, was born in Sydney, and won seven international rugby caps for Australia.
