= Patrick Mulligan (rugby union) =

- Born: Patrick James Mulligan c. 1900

Rugby union career
- Position: centre
International career
Years	Team	Apps	(Points)
1925	Wallabies	1	(0)

Patrick James Mulligan (born c. 1900) was a rugby union player who represented Australia.

Mulligan, a centre, and played in 1 international match for Australia, against the New Zealand XV at Sydney, on 13 June 1925.
