= 1899 British Lions tour to Australia =

Rugby union tour

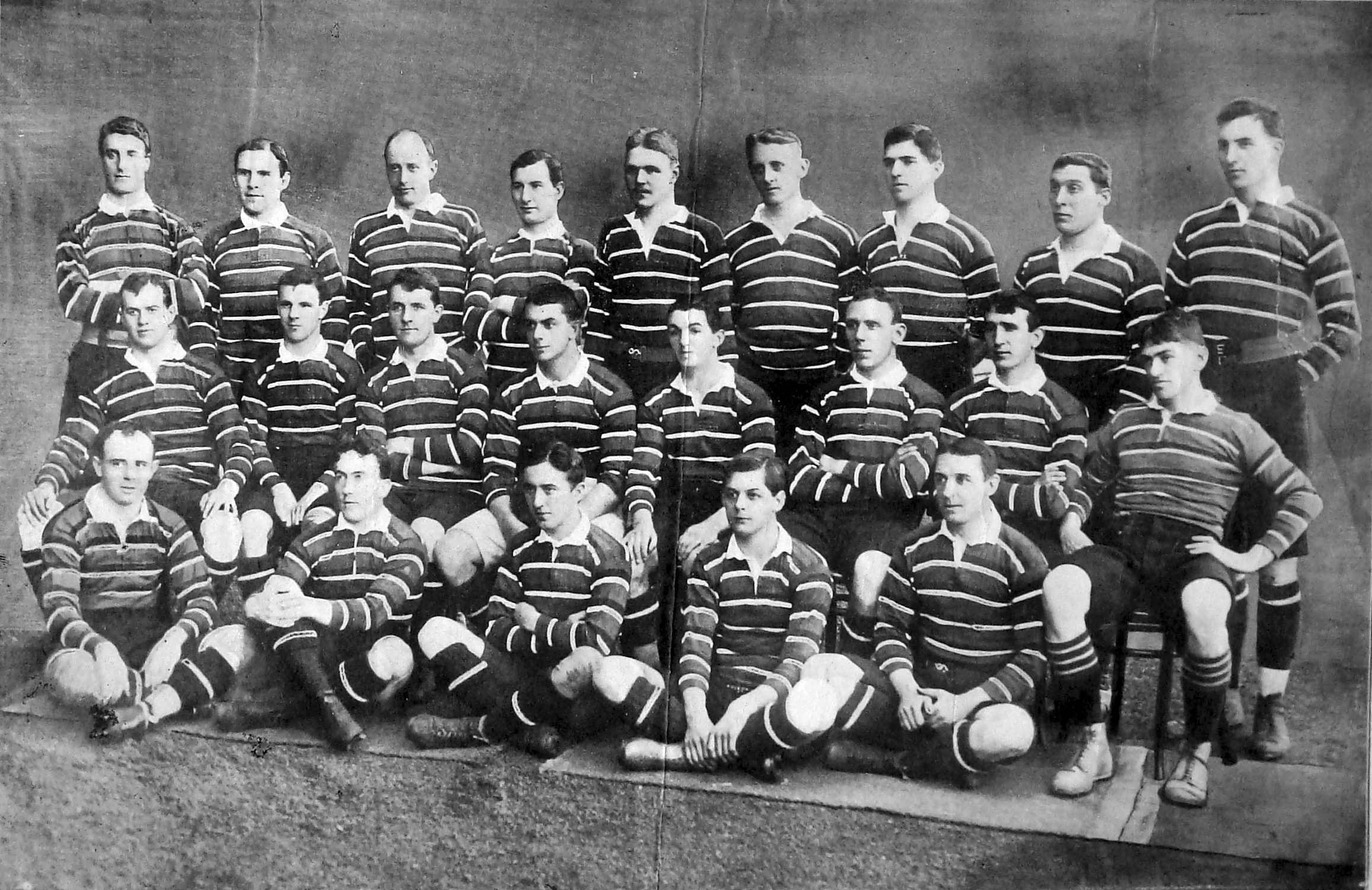
- The touring British team
- Date: 14 June – 19 August
- Coach: Matthew Mullineux
- Tour captains: (England) Matthew Mullineux; (England) Frank Stout
- Test series winners: British and Irish Lions (1–3)
- Top test point scorer: (England) Charlie Adamson (17)
Summary
P	W	D	L
Total
21	18	0	3
Test match
4	3	0	1
Opponent
P	W	D	L
Australia
4	3	0	1

Tour chronology
- ← South Africa 1896 South Africa 1903 →

The 1899 British Isles tour to Australia was the fourth rugby union tour by a British Isles team and the second to Australia; though the first tour in 1888 was a private venture, making the 1899 tour the first official undertaking of Australia. It is retrospectively classed as one of the British Lions tours, as the Lions naming convention was not adopted until 1950.

While the tour traversed a number of colonies, all arrangements were made solely with or through the New South Wales Rugby Football Union (NSWRFU). Negotiations had taken place for the tour to incorporate matches against New Zealand, either through a visit to New Zealand, or a NZRFU team to play in Sydney. No agreeable terms could be found.

With the Federation of the Australian colonies progressing, including the possible inclusion of New Zealand, a likewise plan to combine the Australian rugby union team with the pick of the best from New Zealand into 'Australasia' for a three Tests series, instead of Australia alone, was progressed but ultimately failed to ensue. This meant all four Tests were played against Australia (now Wallabies).

Selected and arranged by rugby player Reverend Matthew Mullineux, this tour was the first to truly represent the British Isles, with players from all four Home Nations. Despite this fact, many Australian newspapers, and some British dailies, referred to the tourists as "the English football team".

== Plan to tour in 1898 ==
After the tour of South Africa in 1896, players in Britain expressed wishes to make a similar tour to Australia. In August 1897, the New South Wales Rugby Football Union (NSWRFU) received a letter from Reverend Matthew Mullineux asking whether a tour beginning in June 1898 would be possible and welcomed by the Union. This request was discussed in depth by the NSWRFU at their 30 September meeting, and it was decided to extend an invitation with the following stipulations. The tour was to be under the auspices of the Rugby Football Union (RFU), with the touring team paying for passage to and from Sydney. The NSWRFU would pay for their internal expenses once in Australia. The British team was to receive a percentage of the profits earned by the attendance at each match, but only up to the cost of their travel. Some debate centred about what level of reimbursement would be allowed; they settled on fifty percent after the initial proposal of twenty percent was deemed too low. They specified that a playing squad be made up of twenty-one players inclusive of the tour manager. They would play two games a week while on tour, in New South Wales, Queensland, and New Zealand. There was also the possibility that the tour would take in Victoria.

The proposal was sanctioned by the RFU, with the strict stipulation that the tour would take place on a purely amateur basis. It was the plan of Mullineux to fill the team with players from the Universities, but the timing of the tour meant that players would need to leave Britain in early May, when vacation had not yet begun. Due to a lack of time to make the necessary arrangements, the tour for 1898 was subsequently cancelled.

== Plan to tour in 1899 ==
A new invitation was sent from the NSWRFU, for a tour to take place in 1899. The RFU, at about the same time, received an invitation from the South African Rugby Football Union, to send a team to tour South Africa in 1899. The RFU wanted confirmation from Mullineux, that a team to tour Australia was for certain able to be formed if the invitation from South Africa was to be turned down. After numerous meetings between the RFU and Mullineux, a decision was made in February 1899 to turn down the tour to South Africa. A cable message was received in February 1899 by the NSWRFU, which was erroneously construed to mean that the Australian tour had been abandoned, with players preferring to make the tour of South Africa. The NSWRFU, having completed all the arrangements for the tour to take place and having rearranged club schedules to accommodate the tour, made enquiries as no official confirmation of the cancellation was received. The misunderstanding was cleared up on 22 February by a message that indicated the tour to Australia was going to proceed. Mullineux stated, "there was never any suggestion of abandoning the Australian tour."

== Touring squad selection ==
The makeup of the touring squad was described in the earliest communication of 1897 from Mullineux, as a team made of university students from his school Cambridge, as well as Oxford University, and also of international representatives. Two problems faced Mullineux. The first was that the timing of the tour meant that players would need to leave Britain in early May, when the university vacations had not yet begun. The second was that a long tour would preclude many of the best players from participating due to other commitments. Consequently, early lists of probable touring players had few players listed that finally made the tour. In the pool of potential players the following were noted: James Byrne, Cecil Boyd, Viv Huzzey, Zimans, Ernest Fookes, Lindsay Watson, M Elliott, Herbert Dudgeon, James Gowans, James Franks, J H Kipling, R Forest, Lawrence Bulger, Timoins, R O Swartz, C B Marston, W Neeks (or Needs), Dr Rowland, J W Gorman, and James Couper. Among these names were several high-profile players whom recruitment attempts failed to secure. Byrne declined due to pressure of business, while Ernest Fookes was awaiting a serious medical operation. The final member to join the team was Scottish international Alf Bucher, after failed approaches were made to recruit fellow Scot James Couper and Welsh wing Viv Huzzey.

=== Touring party ===
The team consisted of 21 players. Nine had international experience, five had played for England, three for Ireland, and one for Scotland and Wales. Commentators thought that the selected team did not fully represent the strength of British rugby, particularly with the absence of James Byrne.

The team played in a kit consisting of a jersey with thick blue bands and thinner red and white bands, representing the colours of the Union Jack, with dark blue shorts and blue stockings finished with red and white tops. The team caps were maroon in colour and bore the motif of a kangaroo replicating the cap style of Sydney's Wallaroo FC. Formal dress comprised a navy blazer, with a breast badge that read "The Anglo-Australian Rugby Football Team".

==== Full backs ====
- Esmond Martelli was 20 years of age when the team departed England. He played for Dublin Wanderers. On tour he played as a fullback, but was able to play at three-quarters also. He was a skilled place, drop and punt kicker.
- Charles Thompson was approximately 25 years old, and played for Lancashire. He was a versatile player who had played at three-quarter, as well as in the forwards. He was a skilled kicker.

==== Three-quarters ====
- Alec Boswell Timms was approximately 27 years of age, and had played for Edinburgh University and trial matches for Scotland, making the Scottish national team in one match in 1896. He excelled as a centre or on the wing. Timms was born in Melbourne, Australia but had been sent to Scotland to study medicine.
- Elliot Nicholson was 27 years of age, and played for Birkenhead Park and Liverpool. His speed was used typically on the wing.
- Alf Bucher was 25 years of age, and played for Edinburgh Academicals and Scotland.
- Gwyn Nicholls was 24 years of age, and played for Cardiff. He was a Welsh international, highly regarded as the best three-quarter to have played since Arthur Gould. He was the first Welsh player to represent a British team in a Test match, and was outstanding at centre in all weather conditions.
- Gerry Doran was 21 years of age, and played for Lansdowne. He represented Ireland in 1899. He was an excellent tackler.

==== Half backs ====
- Matthew Mullineux was 31 years of age, played for Blackheath and Moseley. and represented Kent. He was the only player who toured South Africa in 1896. He was the instigator, planner, and manager of the British team. He served as captain on a number of the tour matches.
- George Cookson was 25 years of age, and played for Manchester and Lancashire. In 1898 he played for the North of England team.
- Charlie Adamson was 24 years of age, and played for Durham, and in 1898 for the North of England team. He had also tried out for the English team on several occasions. He was a versatile player, being able to play at half back, three quarter or centre. He finished the tour as the test top scorer, with 17 points, including a try in both the second and fourth tests.

==== Forwards ====
- Frank Stout was 22 years of age, and played for Gloucester. He also represented England. Stout was rated among the very best of England's forwards.
- Wallace Jarman was 26 years of age, and was the captain of Bristol football club. He also played for Gloucestershire. He had represented England. He consistently put hard work into the scrum, followed kicks down field, and was a difficult player to defend when he dribbled the ball down the field.
- H.G.S. Gray played for Cambridge University, and in trial matches for Scotland. He was a past student of Ley's School in Cambridge.
- George Ralph Gibson was 21 years of age, and played for Northern, as well as representing England.
- William Judkins played for Coventry. He was a past student of Repton School.
- Frederick Belson was 25 years of age, and played for Bath and Somerset. He was a past student of Clifton College.
- John Francomb was approximately 26 years of age, played for Manchester, and represented Lancashire. He was a past student of Oxford. He was a very tall player.
- Blair Swannell was 23 years of age, and played for Northampton. He represented the East Midlands team.
- Guy Evers was 24 years of age, and played for Moseley. He was a past student of Haileybury.
- Tom McGown was 23 years of age, and played for North of Ireland. He had relatives living in Dunedin, New Zealand and paid them a visit after the season was done.
- Alan Ayre-Smith was 22 years of age, played for Guy's Hospital, and represented Surrey. He was a hard playing forward.

== Plan for tour to New Zealand ==
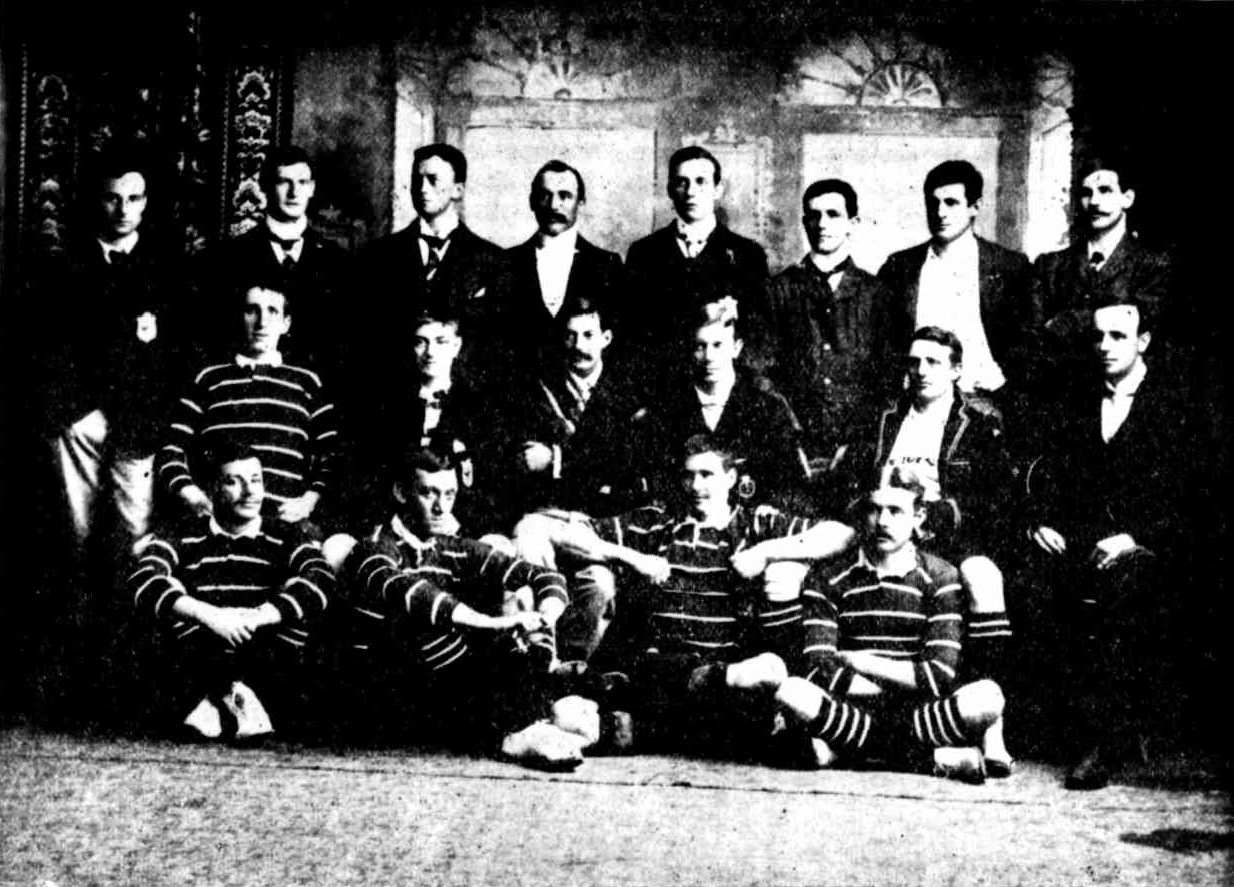
The British rugby union team in 1899, while at Albany, West Australia. Sixteen members of the team are shown here, along with two delegates of the Perth Rugby Union.

The plan to include New Zealand in the British tour was made in the initial correspondence from the NSWRFU to Mullineux in 1897. Since the New Zealand Rugby Union (NZRU) was not in direct negotiations with Mullinuex, they had to work with the NSWRFU to try to negotiate the New Zealand leg of the proposed tour. The NZRU requested from the NSWRFU that they be able to have direct dealings with Mullineux, but this did not eventuate. An extension of the tour to New Zealand threatened attempts at fielding a strong British representative team. Consequently, the New Zealand leg of the tour became less likely as the tour for 1899 was negotiated. The NSWRFU limited the length of the tour to eight weeks from June to August, giving the British an option to add two weeks to their playing schedules if they wished to add New Zealand to their tour program.

In addition to the lack of time, Mullineux had expressed to the NSWRFU that he had been led to believe that a tour of New Zealand would not be profitable. The NSWRFU reinforced his beliefs by indicating that the New Zealand union had been unwilling to pay for the travel to and from England, but only the travel to and from Auckland. There was some sentiment expressed that, because the team was not an English, but a British team, the expense to have the touring team visit was not warranted. The cost of bringing the British team to New Zealand to play in Otago, Auckland, Wellington, and Canterbury was estimated at £400. In November 1898, it was proposed at a meeting of the NZRU that the NZRU would pay for the full cost of England's travel to and from New Zealand, and within New Zealand. The sub-unions provided guarantees of a percentage of their gate profits to the NZRU. These terms were agreed to by the NSWRFU. In April, the lengthening of the tour was refused by the British team.

Some hope was still held out for a New Zealand leg of the tour, provided that the NSWRFU cut short the Australian leg of the tour by a week, reducing the number of test matches to three, and cutting country matches, thereby providing time for a short trip to Auckland and Wellington. The NZRU offered only £250 for the two matches, and not the £400 plus all expenses that was requested for the two games. Billy Warbrick in a letter to the Referee highlighted the generosity of the NSWRFU offer, as it stood to lose an estimated £1200 from the loss of two major matches in Australia. The British team decided in mid-July to not make the tour of New Zealand.

As an alternative to touring New Zealand, expectations formed that a match would be played against an Australasian team consisting of Australian and New Zealand players. There was also the proposal that a match against a New Zealand team would be played in Australia if the British decided not to travel on to New Zealand. Subsequently, the NZRU forbade their players from playing in the matches in Australia. The NSWRFU proposed a date for New Zealand to play in Australia, on 5 August, with a combined Australasian match played a week later on 12 August. This plan was declined by the NZRU, citing the resolutions of the local unions to not send players to Australia.

During the British tour, proposals were made by players in New Zealand to make a tour of Britain in 1900. This tour did not happen.

== Voyage and travel ==
Team kit

The tour party left Charing Cross Station on 9 May 1899; coincidentally the day the Australian cricket team began their 1899 tour of England. There they travelled to France, where they boarded the P&O liner RMS Oceana at the port of Marseille. The ocean trip to Australia took five weeks travelling via the Red Sea of which the travelling party complained of the heat. The team briefly stopped at Albany, Western Australia in good health, and were met by delegates of the Perth Rugby Union, and the Mayor. From there they completed their voyage, docking at Adelaide on 11 June, where they were met by delegates of the South Australian Football Association, principally J. R. Anderson, and D. T. Lawes, as well as W. A. Rand, the secretary of the New South Wales Rugby Union. Rand acted as host and financier, accompanying the British team for the duration of the tour. They travelled overland by the express train to Melbourne on 12 June. From Melbourne they continued their journey to Sydney.

For this tour, the Lions wore brought back the white and blue, the blue used in thick hoops and the red and white in thin bands. A modern version of this jersey would be later worn by England in their one-off Test against Australia in Sydney in 1999, played to commemorate the centenary of the Wallabies' first Test, against those early British tourists. For their part, Australia wore a light blue uniform (similar to worn by the "Wallabies" in that first 1899 Test).

== Match summary ==
The Australian tour took in 21 matches; four were Test matches against the Australian national team (now Wallabies), while the remainder were against regional and invitational teams. The British Isles lost the first Test, but won the last three Tests to take the series 3–1. After the first loss to the Australians, team captain Mullineux dropped himself from the team for the rest of the tour, with Frank Stout taking the captain's role for the remaining Tests. The decision by Mullineux to replace his position with Charles Adamson is seen as the tour's turning point, which saw the British team begin to win matches by more convincing margins and eventually control the Tests.

The complete list of matches played by the British Isles in Australia is the following:

Test matches

#	Date	Opponent	Location	Result	Score
1	14 June	Central Southern	Goulburn	Won	11–3
2	17 June	New South Wales	Sydney	Won	4–3
3	20 June	Metropolitan	Sydney	Won	8–5
4	24 June	Australia	Sydney	Lost	3–13
5	28 June	Toowoomba	Toowoomba	Won	19–5
6	1 July	Queensland Reds	Brisbane	Lost	3–11
7	5 July	Bundaberg	Bundaberg	Won	36–3
8	8 July	Rockhampton	Rockhampton	Won	16–3
9	11 July	Mount Morgan	Mount Morgan	Won	29–3
10	15 July	Central Queensland	Rockhampton	Won	22–3
11	19 July	Maryborough	Maryborough	Won	27–8
12	22 July	Australia	Brisbane	Won	11–0
13	25 July	New England	Armidale	Won	6–4
14	27 July	Northern	Newcastle	Won	28–0
15	29 July	NSW Waratahs	Sydney	Won	11–5
16	1 August	Metropolitan	Sydney	Lost	5–8
17	5 August	Australia	Sydney	Won	11–10
18	9 August	Western Districts	Bathurst	Won	19–0
19	12 August	Australia	Sydney	Won	13–0
20	15 August	Great Public Schools	Sydney	Won	21–3
21	19 August	Victoria	Melbourne	Won	30–0

Balance
Pl	W	D	L	Ps	Pc
21	18	0	3	333	90

== Match details ==
=== Central Southern ===
14 June

Central Southern	3–11	British Isles
Try: Kimpton		Try: Adamson; Timms (2); Con: Adamson

Showgrounds, Goulburn
Attendance: 4000
Referee: W Cain

Team details

Central Southern: W Rogan, Chard, McGee (captain), W Hayes, Seaborn, Gillespie, D Ryan, James Pryke, John Pryke, Hampel, Hughes, Rawcliffe, Williams, Muirhead, Kimpton; Replacement: E Mills
British Isles: Esmond Martelli, Alf Bucher, Alec Timms, Charlie Adamson, Gwyn Nicholls, Gerry Doran, Matthew Mullineux captain, Frank Stout, Wallace Jarman, Tom McGown, H.G.S. Gray, Frederick Belson, Alan Ayre-Smith, George Gibson, Charles Thompson

=== New South Wales, 1st match ===
17 June

New South Wales	3–4	British Isles
Try: Peter Ward		Goal from mark: Esmond Martelli

Sydney Cricket Ground
Attendance: 20,000
Referee: J F Macmanamey

Team details

New South Wales: Frank Row (captain), Lonnie Spragg, Bill Shortland, Charlie White, Iggy O'Donnell, Peter Ward, Arch Boyd, George Wheeler, Norm Street, Alex Kelly, Hyram Marks, Albert Gardiner, Walter Davis, Charlie Ellis, Bill Webb
British Isles: Esmond Martelli, Alf Bucher, Charlie Adamson, Gwyn Nicholls, Gerry Doran, Matthew Mullineux (captain), George Cookson, Frank Stout, Wallace Jarman, Tom McGown, John Francomb, H.G.S. Gray, Frederick Belson, Alan Ayre-Smith, George Gibson

=== Metropolitan, 1st match ===
20 June

Metropolitan	5–8	British Isles
Try: Carson; Con: Frank Row		Try: Alf Bucher; Wallace Jarman

Agricultural Ground, Sydney
Attendance: 25,000
Referee: A J Faulkner

Team details

Metropolitan: James McMahon, Charlie White, Frank Row, Syd Miller, Peter Ward, Iggy O'Donnell, Arch Boyd, James Carson, Bill Webb, Charlie Ellis, Hyram Marks, Walter Davis, Alex Kelly, C Purdue, Quinsey
British Isles: Charles Thompson, Alf Bucher, Elliot Nicholson, Charlie Adamson, Gwyn Nicholls, Matthew Mullineux (captain), George Cookson, Frank Stout, William Judkins, Wallace Jarman, Tom McGown, John Francomb, Blair Swannell, H.G.S. Gray, George Gibson

=== First Test ===
24 June
15:05

Australia	13–3	(United Kingdom) British Isles
Try: Colton^{1} Evans; Spragg; Con: Spragg (2)		Try: Nicholls

Sydney Cricket Ground, Sydney
Attendance: 28,000
Referee: WG Garrard (New Zealand)

Team details

Australia (Note: From 1899, Australia tended to use the colours of the state they were playing in, the Waratah's light blue in Sydney and the Queensland Reds' maroon in Brisbane.)	British Isles

^{1} The try recorded as scored by Colton is often credited to Kelly, as both players, along with Evans jumped on a loose ball over the try line; there is no definitive record if Colton or Kelly were awarded the try.

Australia: Bob McCowan, Charlie White, Frank Row captain, Lonnie Spragg, William Evans, Peter Ward, Austin Gralton, James Carson, Dooee Tanner, Patrick Carew, Walter Davis, Charlie Ellis, Hyram Marks, Ginger Colton, Alex Kelly
British Isles: Esmond Martelli, Alf Bucher, Charlie Adamson, Gwyn Nicholls, Gerry Doran, Matthew Mullineux captain, George Cookson, Frank Stout, Wallace Jarman, Tom McGown, John Franscombe, H.G.S. Gray, Frederick Belson, Alan Ayre-Smith, George Gibson
Touch umpires: Blair Swannell and Billy Warbrick

The first Test played by Australia was played at the Sydney Cricket Ground under excellent weather conditions. The temperature on the day of the game reached 60 °F (16 °C), and there was almost no breeze. There was a great deal of interest in the match, with the Sydney Morning Herald and Brisbane Courier both reporting 30,000 in attendance, and the United Press Association reporting 27,000 in attendance. The attendance was officially recorded as 28,000. Tickets for the game were one shilling for general admission, and two shillings for grand stand seats, while children were admitted at half price. In all the game grossed £1200. A full program of events had been scheduled with a preliminary rugby match played by local teams, Wallaroo, and Randwick at 1:45pm, as well as heats of a one-mile bicycle race by the "League of Wheelmen". The final of the bicycle race was scheduled during the half-time break. Special trams had been arranged for the event, with the Tramway Service reporting that every available tram had been used for the extra traffic on the day; fully 131 carloads were conveyed to the match.

It had been noted in the lead up to the Test that the British team was out of condition. The writer "Player" in the Brisbane Courier believed that the first Test was Australia's only chance to beat the British team, as he felt that with the British team's condition improving during the tour, they would be impossible to beat. The British team had been dealing with some illness and injury, necessitating the fielding of a team in the Test that was not their first choice, but in the end identical to the team that played New South Wales the previous weekend. Elliot Nicholson, Alec Timms, and Charles Thompson were all listed as playing, but last minute changes were made. While at a swimming bath, Nicholson injured his foot on a protruding nail, and was unable to play. Bucher played in his place. Timms did not recover from an injury received in the match at Goulburn in time to make the field. Adamson was moved from the halves to the three-quarters to fill his place, and in turn Cookson filled the opening in the halves left by Adamson. Martelli, who had injured his thumb in the match against Goulburn, and had taken the field against New South Wales, but had to retire due to injury, recovered in time to play in place of Thompson. It had been feared on the evening before the match, that Gwyn Nicholls had caught influenza and would be incapacitated, but instead he had a severe cold. Rev. Mullineux also took to the field with a cold. The British played field of four players, at three-quarters, and two half-backs, that contrasted with the Australian field of only one half-back, two at five-eighth, and three at three-quarters.

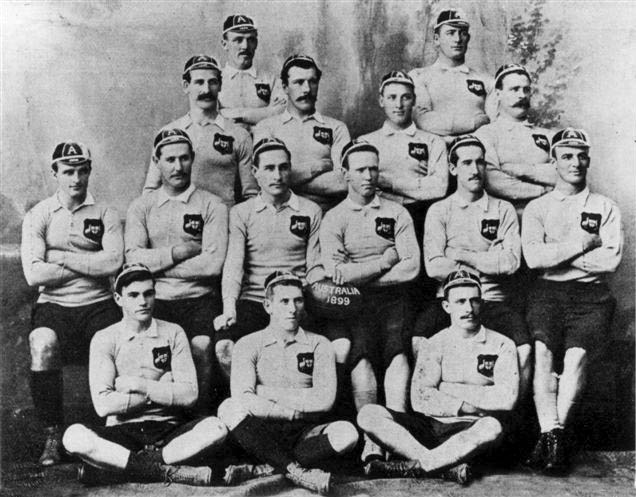
The Australian side who contested the 1st Test of 1899

The Australian team on the other hand had no such changes, although the inclusion of M'Cowan had been in doubt only a week before the game, due to a strain. The team consisted of six Queensland players, with the balance made up by New South Wales representatives. Selectors chose to keep the New South Wales and Wallaroo FC three-quarter combination of Spragg, Row and White intact. The only noted absences from the team were Tom Pauling and A. J. Lewis, who suffered injuries in the inter-colonial match the week before the Test. Training of the team was supervised by Billy Warbrick. The Australian team wore the blue colours of NSW.

In the week preceding the match, Mullineux had requested that a conference be held to review some differences in the interpretation of the rules of the game from how the game was played in Britain.

While the two teams played an evenly matched game until the British performance, particularly in defence, dropped off towards the later stages. The poor condition of the British team was noticeable, and was attributed as the reason the British lost the game. The writer for the United Press Association was of the opinion that the British performance was somewhat poorer than in the game played against New South Wales the previous weekend. The British did show some deft ball handling skills in the game: "The beautiful series of passes which gained the try for the Englishmen was considered as being an excellent object lesson in backing up. Some of the players, without looking where they were throwing the ball, passed simply because they knew their comrades would be in position to receive it." The British were criticised for the slow rate in which they got the ball from the scrum, an area of play, in which Australia excelled. The writer for the Queanbeyan Age noted that the Australians forwards played "too fast" for the British. The United Press Association named White and Ward as the outstanding players for Australia.

==== First half ====
Mullineux having won the coin toss elected to defend the northern end of the field. Gralton opened play with the kick off. Mullineux made a mark in the first minutes of the game, but he kicked poorly. Soon after, a free kick was awarded to the British. The Nicholls kick for touch remained within the field of play and came within five yards of the Australian try line. Doran received and carried the ball in to touch. Another free kick to the British resulted from the line-out. The goal attempt by Martelli was unsuccessful.

Play continued with both teams attacking the other strongly. Gralton, Ward and Evans for Australia, made good passing combinations on a number of occasions. Cookson and Stout making notable plays for Britain, with Stout showing in one run: "a remarkable feint, having to stop almost dead and then wheel round to hoax his opponent". Britain pressured the Australian line, with play coming to within five yards from the try line. Pressure was applied through passing the ball starting from Mullineux, and on to Cookson, Bucher, Nicholls, and Doran who was tackled well by Spragg. A scrum that was formed close to the Australian try line was won by Australia, and Gralton cleared the ball to mid-field with a kick. Subsequent play shifted the attack to the British half. Here the Gralton, Ward, Evans combination brought Evans close to the British try line. A subsequent scrum yielded the ball to Gralton who forced his way forward, but he lost the ball. and the British cleared the ball to the western sideline. The relief was short lived, as the attack was once again brought against the British in the center of the field. Evans receiving the ball, made an unsuccessful drop goal attempt sending the ball high and wide of the goal. The ball dropped in front of the British fullback Martelli who overran the ball, having let the ball bounce. Australian players came rushing through and jumped upon the loose ball. The referee awarded the try, against the protests of the British who claimed that Kelly had illegally interfered with Martelli getting to the ball, as well as an off-side by the Australians. The reporter for the Sydney Morning Herald wrote, "From the press table, in the balcony of the members' pavilion, the interference appeared to be simply a jostle but it seemed hard to come to any other conclusion than that Kelly and Colton were off-side." The try scorer is officially recorded as Colton, but Kelly is in other places recorded as the try scorer. The conversion attempt by Spragg was unsuccessful.

The restart of play was the scene of some amusement to the spectators, with the Australians returning the British drop-out, with a kick for touch. The touch umpire raised his flag, to signal touch had been found near the British 25. However, play continued, and the ball was kicked downfield into the Australians half. Some of the British players expecting play to be halted for a line-out, stood near the touch umpire who continued to hold his flag aloft. Play continued, with the Australians eventually returning play back upfield, and eventually finding touch a few yards from where the touch umpire was still standing with flag raised. The umpire alerted the referee to the earlier touch, but he was over-ruled.

In the following passage of play, the British having been awarded a penalty, kicked for touch, bringing it down into Australians half. Carson who had been performing strongly in the line-outs, won the ball from the British throw-in, allowing Australia to return the ball back to half-way. The British showed some of their strong ball handling skills in the following phases. Ensuing play resulted in a penalty against Australia, which was unsuccessfully kicked for a goal attempt by Martelli. The Australians brought the ball upfield in a strong attack that resulted in the British forcing the ball in goal. The end of the half was called.

==== Second half ====
Stout kicked off for England in the second half and the ball was subsequently returned into touch, near the half way. The first fifteen minutes of the half were characterised as evenly matched, White had a one run, where he successfully fended a couple of tackle attempts and followed on with a kick for touch to bring the ball into the British half. After a number of phases Evans secured the ball, and kicked downfield to Martelli. However, a penalty against Australia allowed the British to relieve.

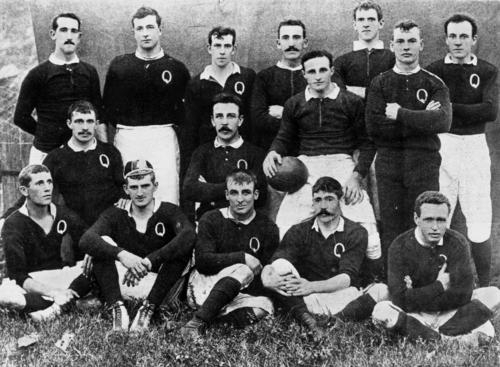
The Queensland team that played the British Lions on 8 July. The players had avoided the photographer through the day, and were finally obliged to sit for the portrait very soon after leaving the field.

Play progressed in neutral territory for a few phases until Mullineux began a series of passes that were praised for the high level of skill shown. The passes went from Mullineux to Cookson, then Francomb, then Doran and on to Nicholls, who was about to cross the touch line only a couple of yards from the try line. In time he blindly passed back, and Adamson, who was in support, received the ball, passed on to Nicholls, who, making it through numerous Australian defenders, crossed the line for the try. Martelli missed the conversion attempt.

The British in the next passage of play were successful in bringing the ball back into the Australians 25, and were soon awarded a free kick. The attempt at goal was poor, and the Australians cleared the ball far down field. The British punt attempt to return the ball back to the Australians end was poor and was charged down, and with the Carew and Cookson pressing their attack by kicking the ball along the ground found their way to the British 25, where the ball was put into touch. The Australians lost the ball in one of the following phases, by way of a Bucher intercept, and had to return to their 25 to defend. A penalty was awarded to the English for off-side play but Martelli's kick for goal was again unsuccessful. Francomb followed the goal kick attempt through, and was narrowly beaten to the ball by Row, who forced it in goal.

In the resumption of play, the ball was returned to the British try line by way of a deep kick by Evans. Martelli carried the ball into touch only a couple of yards from the British try line. Play continued in the British half, with a temporary relief kick being made by Britain. The match was now within the last seven minutes. After a series of scrums, Australia secured possession, and Spragg almost scored in the corner, but it was ruled that he stepped into touch. In the following passage of play, Spragg received the ball by way of a scrum win and quick passes, and made a "dodgy run" to break through the British line and score a try about halfway between the corner and the goal posts. In turn he kicked for the conversion and was successful.

The Australians received the kick restart, and Carew kicked the ball back into British territory. The Australians forwards coming downfield, overwhelmed Martelli and secured the resulting loose ball. The ball went from Ward, to Evans and on to Spragg, who being blocked by the British Defense, passed the ball back to Evans who crossed the line, running around to score the try under the goal posts. The conversion kick by Spragg was once again successful. Full-time was called, after the kick was made.

=== Toowoomba ===
28 June

Toowoomba	5–19	British Isles
Try: Phil Thomas; Con: Broadfoot		Try: H.G.S. Gray; Gwyn Nicholls (2); Charlie Adamson; Con: Charlie Adamson (2); Pen: Charlie Adamson

Royal Society Grounds, Toowoomba
Attendance: 2500

Team details

Toowoomba: Filshie (captain), Phil Thomas, Doyle, Jarro, Redwood, Broadfoot, Allman, Young, Tolmie. Other names not listed.
British Isles: Esmond Martelli, Alf Bucher, Charlie Adamson, Gwyn Nicholls, Gerry Doran, George Cookson, Frank Stout (captain), William Judkins, Guy Evers, Wallace Jarman, Tom McGown, Blair Swannell, H.G.S. Gray, Alan Ayre-Smith, George Gibson

=== Queensland ===
1 July

Queensland	11–3	British Isles
Try: Corfe (2); Evans; Con: Gralton		Try: Mullineux

Brisbane
Referee: Alf Faulkner

Team details

Queensland: Tanner, Graham, Carew, Austin, Boland, A J Colton, Corfe, T Colton, Gralton, Currie, Kent, Dixon, Evans, Ward, McCowan (captain)
British Isles: Esmond Martelli, Charles Thompson, Alf Bucher, Alec Timms, Charlie Adamson, Gwyn Nicholls, Gerry Doran, Matthew Mullineux (captain), Frank Stout, Wallace Jarman, Tom McGown, John Francomb, Blair Swannell, H.G.S. Gray, Frederick Belson

=== Bundaberg ===
5 July

Bundaberg	3–36	British Isles

Bundaberg

Team details

Bundaberg:
British Isles: Esmond Martelli, Charles Thompson, Alf Bucher, Alec Timms, Elliot Nicholson, Charlie Adamson, Gwyn Nicholls, Gerry Doran, Matthew Mullineux captain, George Cookson, Frank Stout, William Judkins, Guy Evers, Wallace Jarman, Tom McGown, John Francomb, Blair Swannell, H.G.S. Gray, Frederick Belson, Alan Ayre-Smith, George Gibson

=== Rockhampton ===
8 July

Rockhampton	3–16	British Isles

Rockhampton

Team details

Rockhampton:
British Isles: Esmond Martelli, Charles Thompson, Alf Bucher, Alec Timms, Elliot Nicholson, Charlie Adamson, Gwyn Nicholls, Gerry Doran, Matthew Mullineux captain, George Cookson, Frank Stout, William Judkins, Guy Evers, Wallace Jarman, Tom McGown, John Francomb, Blair Swannell, H.G.S. Gray, Frederick Belson, Alan Ayre-Smith, George Gibson

=== Mount Morgan ===
11 July

Mount Morgan	3–29	British Isles

Mount Morgan

Team details

Mount Morgan:

British Isles: Esmond Martelli, Charles Thompson, Alf Bucher, Alec Timms, Elliot Nicholson, Charlie Adamson, Gwyn Nicholls, Gerry Doran, Matthew Mullineux captain, George Cookson, Frank Stout, William Judkins, Guy Evers, Wallace Jarman, Tom McGown, John Francomb, Blair Swannell, H.G.S. Gray, Frederick Belson, Alan Ayre-Smith, George Gibson

=== Central Queensland ===
15 July

Central Queensland	3–22	British Isles

Team details

Central Queensland:
British Isles: Esmond Martelli, Charles Thompson, Alf Bucher, Alec Timms, Elliot Nicholson, Charlie Adamson, Gwyn Nicholls, Gerry Doran, Matthew Mullineux captain, George Cookson, Frank Stout, William Judkins, Guy Evers, Wallace Jarman, Tom McGown, John Francomb, Blair Swannell, H.G.S. Gray, Frederick Belson, Alan Ayre-Smith, George Gibson

=== Maryborough ===
19 July

Maryborough	8–27	British Isles

Maryborough

Team details

Maryborough:
British Isles: Esmond Martelli, Charles Thompson, Alf Bucher, Alec Timms, Elliot Nicholson, Charlie Adamson, Gwyn Nicholls, Gerry Doran, Matthew Mullineux captain, George Cookson, Frank Stout, William Judkins, Guy Evers, Wallace Jarman, Tom McGown, John Francomb, Blair Swannell, H.G.S. Gray, Frederick Belson, Alan Ayre-Smith, George Gibson

=== Second Test ===
22 July

Australia	0–11	(United Kingdom) British Isles
		Try: Nicholls; Adamson; Ayre-Smith; Con: Adamson

Exhibition Ground, Brisbane
Attendance: 15,000
Referee: William H Beattie

Team details

Australia	British Isles

Australia: Bob McCowan captain, Thomas Ward, Albert Henry, SA Spragg, WT Evans, Peter Ward, Ernest Currie, WH Tanner, Charles Graham, PJ Carew, Hyram Marks Charlie Ellis, Arthur Corfe, Robert Challoner, Norm Street
British Isles: Charles Thompson, H.G.S. Gray, Alec Timms, Gwyn Nicholls, Gerry Doran, Charlie Adamson, George Cookson, Frank Stout captain, Wallace Jarman, Tom McGown, Guy Evers, Blair Swanell, William Judkins, Alan Ayre-Smith, George Gibson
Touch umpires: John Francomb and E J Beard

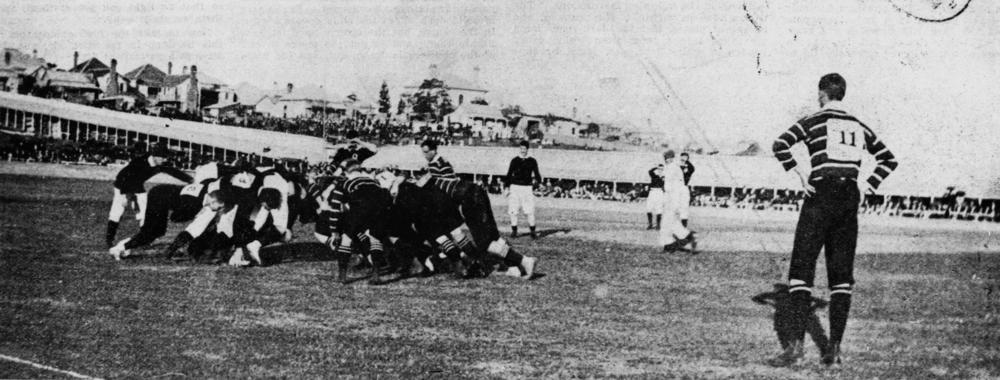
Queensland plays Mullineux's English Team at Rugby Union in Brisbane

The second Test was played at the Brisbane Exhibition Ground, in front of 15,000 spectators: a record Queensland crowd for attendance at a rugby match. In addition to the spectators inside the ground, a crowd estimated at 3,000 assembled on the hill overlooking the exhibition grounds on the Fortitude Valley side of Bowen Terrace. Special trains with reduced fairs, and returning in the evening, had been arranged by the Railway Commissioner Gray for the day operating from Maryborough, and Warwick. These trains as well as the regular service trains were filled to capacity. People came hundreds of miles to see the game: from Longreach, Charleville, Gladstone, and Rockhampton. In attendance was Governor Lamington and Lady Lamington, George Le Hunte the Governor of New Guinea, among other socialites of the day. Tickets to the game were one shilling. Additional entertainment was provided by the Headquarters Band, who were criticised by the writer in the Brisbane Courier for playing their usual playlist, which included La mascotte and Dorothy, and not a fresh repertoire of music. The weather was fine, with a strong, north-east breeze blowing across the field. The temperature on the day rose to 66.6 °F (19.2 °C).

The Australian team wore the maroon red of Queensland, with a badge of the Australian Coat of Arms.

=== New England ===
25 July

New England	4–6	British Isles

Armidale

Team details

New England:
British Isles: Esmond Martelli, Charles Thompson, Alf Bucher, Alec Timms, Elliot Nicholson, Charlie Adamson, Gwyn Nicholls, Gerry Doran, Matthew Mullineux captain, George Cookson, Frank Stout, William Judkins, Guy Evers, Wallace Jarman, Tom McGown, John Francomb, Blair Swannell, H.G.S. Gray, Frederick Belson, Alan Ayre-Smith, George Gibson

=== Northern ===
27 July

Northern	0–28	British Isles

Newcastle

Team details

Northern:
British Isles: Esmond Martelli, Charles Thompson, Alf Bucher, Alec Timms, Elliot Nicholson, Charlie Adamson, Gwyn Nicholls, Gerry Doran, Matthew Mullineux captain, George Cookson, Frank Stout, William Judkins, Guy Evers, Wallace Jarman, Tom McGown, John Francomb, Blair Swannell, H.G.S. Gray, Frederick Belson, Alan Ayre-Smith, George Gibson

=== New South Wales, 2nd match ===
29 July

New South Wales	5–11	British Isles

Sydney

New South Wales: Frank Row captain
British Isles: Esmond Martelli, Charles Thompson, Alf Bucher, Alec Timms, Elliot Nicholson, Charlie Adamson, Gwyn Nicholls, Gerry Doran, Matthew Mullineux captain, George Cookson, Frank Stout, William Judkins, Guy Evers, Wallace Jarman, Tom McGown, John Francomb, Blair Swannell, H.G.S. Gray, Frederick Belson, Alan Ayre-Smith, George Gibson |}

=== Metropolitan, 2nd match ===
1 August

Metropolitan	8–5	British Isles

Sydney

Team details

Metropolitan: Frank Row captain
British Isles: Esmond Martelli, Charles Thompson, Alf Bucher, Alec Timms, Elliot Nicholson, Charlie Adamson, Gwyn Nicholls, Gerry Doran, Matthew Mullineux captain, George Cookson, Frank Stout, William Judkins, Guy Evers, Wallace Jarman, Tom McGown, John Francomb, Blair Swannell, H.G.S. Gray, Frederick Belson, Alan Ayre-Smith, George Gibson

=== Third Test ===
5 August

Australia	10–11	(United Kingdom) British Isles
Try: Spragg (2); Con: Spragg (2)		Try: Bucher (2); Timms; Con: Adamson (2)

Sydney Cricket Ground, Sydney
Attendance: 16,000
Referee: WS Corr

Team details

Australia: Wally Cobb, Syd Miller, Frank Row captain, SA Spragg, PM Ward, Iggy O'Donnell, Arch Boyd, Bill Webb, George Bouffler, PJ Carew, W Davis, CS Ellis, Roger Barton, AJ Colton, Sine Boland
British Isles: Charles Thompson, Alf Bucher, Alec Timms, Gwyn Nicholls, Elliot Nicholson, Charlie Adamson, George Cookson, Frank Stout captain, Wallace Jarman, Tom McGown, Guy Evers, Blair Swanell, William Judkins, Alan Ayre-Smith, George Gibson

=== Western Districts ===
9 August

Western Districts	0–19	British Isles

Bathurst

Team details

Western Districts:
British Isles: Esmond Martelli, Charles Thompson, Alf Bucher, Alec Timms, Elliot Nicholson, Charlie Adamson, Gwyn Nicholls, Gerry Doran, Matthew Mullineux captain, George Cookson, Frank Stout, William Judkins, Guy Evers, Wallace Jarman, Tom McGown, John Francomb, Blair Swannell, H.G.S. Gray, Frederick Belson, Alan Ayre-Smith, George Gibson

=== Fourth Test ===
12 August

Australia	0–13	(United Kingdom) British Isles
		Try: Bucher (2); Adamson; Con: Adamson (2); Pen: Adamson

Sydney Cricket Ground, Sydney
Attendance: 7,000
Referee: WS Corr

Team details

Australia: Wally Cobb, Bob McCowan, Frank Row captain, Lonnie Spragg, PM Ward, Iggy O'Donnell, Austin Gralton, W Webb, Jack O'Donnell, Patrick Carew, W Davis, Charlie Ellis, Bill Hardcastle, Jum Sampson, Sine Boland
British Isles: Charles Thompson, Alf Bucher, Alec Timms, Gwyn Nicholls, Elliot Nicholson, Charles Adamson, George Cookson, Frank Stout captain, Wallace Jarman, Tom McGown, Guy Evers, Blair Swanell, William Judkins, Ayer Ayre-Smith, George Gibson

=== Combined Great Public Schools ===
15 August

Combined Great Public Schools	3–21	British Isles

Sydney Cricket Ground

Team details

Combined Great Public Schools:
British Isles: Esmond Martelli, Charles Thompson, Alf Bucher, Alec Timms, Elliot Nicholson, Charlie Adamson, Gwyn Nicholls, Gerry Doran, Matthew Mullineux captain, George Cookson, Frank Stout, William Judkins, Guy Evers, Wallace Jarman, Tom McGown, John Francomb, Blair Swannell, H.G.S. Gray, Frederick Belson, Alan Ayre-Smith, George Gibson

=== Victoria ===
19 August

Victoria	0–30	British Isles

Melbourne

Team details

Victoria:
British Isles: Esmond Martelli, Charles Thompson, Alf Bucher, Alec Timms, Elliot Nicholson, Charlie Adamson, Gwyn Nicholls, Gerry Doran, Matthew Mullineux captain, George Cookson, Frank Stout, William Judkins, Guy Evers, Wallace Jarman, Tom McGown, John Francomb, Blair Swannell, H.G.S. Gray, Frederick Belson, Alan Ayre-Smith, George Gibson

== Bibliography ==
- Griffiths, John (1987). The Phoenix Book of International Rugby Records. London: Phoenix House. ISBN 0-460-07003-7.
- Jenkins, Vivian (1981). Rothmans Rugby Yearbook 1981–82. Aylesbury: Rothmans Publications Ltd. ISBN 0-907574-05-X.
- Parry-Jones, David (1999). Prince Gwyn, Gwyn Nicholls and the First Golden Era of Welsh Rugby. Bridgend: seren. ISBN 1-85411-262-7.
- Zavos, Spiro, "'For the love of the game': The story of the first rugby Test against England at the SCG, 24 June 1899", The Roar, 2016.
- Zavos, Spiro (2000). The Golden Wallabies. Victoria: Penguin. ISBN 0-14-029601-8.
