= 1899 Metropolitan Rugby Union season =

1899 Sydney Rugby Premiership
- Duration: 6 May to 30 September
- Teams: 8
- Premiers: Wallaroo (7th title)
- Minor Premiers: Wallaroo (4th title)
- Runners-up: Randwick
- Wooden spoon: Parramatta
- Top point-scorer: Lonnie Spragg (60)
- Top try-scorer: Charlie White (11)

Second Grade
- Number of teams: 14
- Premiers: Glebe
- Runners-up: South Sydney

Third Grade
- Number of teams: 17
- Premiers: Forest Lodge Cambridge
- Runners-up: Waverley Oaks

The 1899 Metropolitan Rugby Union season was the 26th season of the Sydney Rugby Premiership. It was the last season run for independent clubs who took their players from across the city. Eight clubs competed from May till September 1899. The season culminated in the premiership, which was won by Wallaroo FC. Wallaroo were crowned premiers by virtue of finishing the season on top of the table.

== Teams ==
Seven clubs contested the season. Paddington and Burwood were missing from the Senior grade having been disbanded during the previous season. Parramatta returned to the Premiership for the first time since 1894. Marrickville and Buccaneer both stepped up from the First Junior to the Senior grade. Marrickville were the current First Junior Premiers.

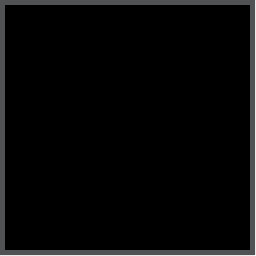
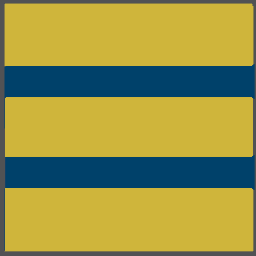
Buccaneer Formed c.1898 Captain: Unknown	Marrickville Formed c.1891 Captain: Unknown	Parramatta Formed c.1879 Captain: Unknown
Pirates Formed c.1889 Captain: James Carson	Randwick Formed c.1882 Ground: Randwick Reserve; Captain: James McMahon	Sydney Formed c.1898 Captain: William Hardcastle
Sydney University Formed on 19 August 1865; Ground: University Oval; Captain: Harry Wood	Wallaroo Formed c.1870 Captain: Paddy Lane

== Season summary ==
The 1899 Sydney Rugby Premiership saw the Wallaroo Football Club win the premiership by four points. The season finished much later than usual due to representative games and poor weather. As a result, the final round of the regular season was canceled in order to play out the finals for the two trophies. This did not effect the results of the premiership as Wallaroo were already too far ahead to be beaten and the finals were not included in the premiership.

According to the club captain, Paddy Lane, Wallaroo fielded their best all-round team. Much of the scoring came from the back row with Alfonso Spragg, Charlie White, Iggy O'Donnell, John Futter and Frank Row scoring 32 of the teams tries. The team experienced good fortune to not have any major injuries during the season despite many of the team playing representatives games in addition to club games. Wallaroo won two out of the three awards for the season, with the team winning the Premiership and the Sydney Cricket Ground Trophy. They surprisingly lost the Agricultural Society Trophy final, only their second loss of the season.

Randwick began the season with an impressive record. They were unbeaten until the eleventh round. This included inflicting the only loss for Wallaroo during the regular season, beating them by one point. The result was reversed when Wallaroo ended Randwick's unbeaten run, winning 11 points to nil. From there, Randwick won only one game in their last four, including fielding only 13 players in the Sydney Cricket Ground semi-final.

As in previous seasons, the Pirates Football Club came along with great dash and strength towards the end of the season. During the regular season games, the team had only won five games. This resulted in them not making the semi-finals for the Sydney Cricket Ground Trophy. However, they made their presence felt during the Agricultural Society Trophy games, winning all of the matches to the final and winning the final brilliantly. This was the third year in a row that the team had won the Agricultural Society Trophy.

== Ladder ==
	Team	Pld	W	D	L	B	PF	PA	PD	Pts
1	Wallaroo	13	12	0	1	0	189	57	132	24
2	Randwick	13	9	2	2	0	115	56	59	20
3	Sydney	13	9	0	4	0	140	81	59	18
4	Marrickville	13	7	2	4	0	128	79	49	16
5	Pirates	13	5	3	5	0	82	55	27	13
6	Buccaneer	13	3	1	9	0	87	162	-75	7
7	Sydney University	13	3	0	10	0	113	157	-44	6
8	Parramatta	13	0	0	13	0	42	249	-207	0

=== Ladder progression ===
- Numbers highlighted in blue indicates the team finished first on the ladder in that round.
- Numbers highlighted in red indicates the team finished in last place on the ladder in that round

	Team	1	2	3	4	5	6	7	8	9	10	11	12	13
1	Wallaroo	2	2	4	6	8	10	12	14	16	18	20	22	24
2	Randwick	2	4	6	7	9	11	13	14	16	18	18	18	20
3	Sydney	2	4	6	8	8	10	10	12	12	12	14	16	18
4	Marrickville	0	2	2	4	4	6	8	9	10	12	14	14	16
5	Pirates	2	4	4	5	7	7	7	8	9	11	11	13	13
6	Buccaneer	0	0	0	0	2	2	2	3	5	5	5	7	7
7	Sydney University	0	0	2	2	2	2	4	4	4	4	6	6	6
8	Parramatta	0	0	0	0	0	0	0	0	0	0	0	0	0

== Trophy finals ==
Even though the premiership was decided at the end of the regular games, a finals series was organised. The games were not included in the premiership results. Two trophies were played for at the end of the season: the Sydney Cricket Ground Trophy and the Agricultural Society Trophy.

=== Finals week 1, 16 September ===
SCG Trophy semi-finals
1	Wallaroo	21
4	Marrickville	4
2	Randwick	0
3	Sydney	3
RAS Trophy qualifying round
5	Pirates	3
6	Buccaneer	0
7	University	W
8	Parramatta	F

==== Sydney Cricket Ground Trophy ====
At the end of the regular season, the top four teams qualified for the Sydney Cricket Ground Trophy. The first week of finals saw these teams play in the semi-finals for the SCG Trophy. As was expected, Wallaroo easily won their match against Marrickville to proceed to the final. The form of the victorious team was that which would have rivalled an Intercolonial match. In their semi-final, Randwick were only able to field 13 players with many unfamiliar faces. Despite this, the team held their own with the Wallaroo players barracking from the sidelines. Sydney won the game with a try in the dying moments to proceed to the final to play against Wallaroo.

==== Agricultural Society Trophy ====
The remaining four teams played the first games towards the Agricultural Society Trophy. In the first game, the Pirates easily won against the Buccaneers. The winners, like Randwick, also had trouble fielding a team to play with the team fielding many unfamiliar faces. The Buccaneer were eliminated from the final series after their loss to the Pirates. The second qualifying game did not happen as Parramatta forfeited the game and thus the final series. As a result, Sydney University received a forfeit to pass through the first qualifying round.

=== Finals week 2, 23 September ===
SCG Trophy final
Wallaroo	16
Sydney	8
RAS Trophy qualifying round
Randwick	0
Pirates	6
Marrickville	0
University	18

==== Sydney Cricket Ground Trophy ====
The final for the trophy was closer than had been expected, despite the final scoreline. At the end of the first half, Wallaroo led Sydney by the slim margin of 1 point. And early in the second half, Sydney scored to take the lead 8 to 6. From there, Sydney failed to capitalise on their momentum and, through some mistakes, Wallaroo were able to score twice to win the match and the trophy.

==== Agricultural Society Trophy ====
The two second round qualifying games for the Agricultural Society Trophy were almost forgotten. Even the clubs struggled to field their best teams. Marrickville had only 11 players in their game against Sydney University. They were no match for the Varsity and lost the game by a large margin. The Pirates-Randwick game saw many unfamiliar faces participating. The Randwick team were almost entirely made up of reserves and, as a result, lost the match 6 to 0. The two victorious teams, the Pirates and Sydney University were to progress to the semi-finals for the Trophy against the two finalists for the SCG Trophy.

=== Finals week 3, 27 September ===
RAS Trophy semi-finals
Wallaroo	18
University	8
Sydney	F
Pirates	W

==== Agricultural Society Trophy ====
The semi-finals for the Agricultural Society Trophy were played midweek on Wednesday. Much of the interest in the games had been lost as the football season had drawn on longer than was necessary. There had been calls for the Union to cancel the semi's and the final. However, the Union ignored these requests and proceeded with the matches.

The weather on the Wednesday the matches were held turned out to be wet and windy. The first semi-final between Wallaroo and University was entirely one-sided with Wallaroo dominating the scoring. The second semi-final ended in a fiasco. Ten minutes into the game, a Sydney player was ordered off the field for striking an opponent. The player refused to go with the game suspended for approximately ten more minutes. After some discussion, the referee decided to end the match. The entire situation was presented that evening to the Union, who awarded the match to the Pirates. What play was seen during the match indicated that the Pirates were the better team.

=== Finals week 4, 30 September ===
==== Agricultural Society Trophy ====
RAS Trophy final
Wallaroo	0
Pirates	10

The final for the Agricultural Society Trophy was played between the Premiers, Wallaroo, and the Pirates. The Pirates put a fantastic team in the field, all in sound condition. They had the measure of Wallaroo, demonstrating excellent defence. The team had an answer for each of the plays that Wallaroo had. During the game, Wallaroo had one moment where they were looking like scoring. However, a pass was fumbled, resulting in a lost opportunity. As in previous years, the Pirates had come good at the right time of the year. This was the third consecutive year that the Pirates had won the Agricultural Society Trophy.

== Statistics ==
=== Points ===
	Player	Pl	T	G	FG	Pts
1	Lonnie Spragg	11	9	15	0	60
2	Hales	9	3	8	1	38
3	Charlie White	15	11	0	1	37
4	C McCoy	13	7	7	0	35
5	Paddy Lane	17	3	12	0	33
6	Iggy O'Donnell	17	6	5	0	29
7	HD Thompson	11	7	0	1	25
8	Walter Davis	15	8	0	0	24
9	C Light	15	0	7	2	23
10	Leo Finn	13	2	6	1	22

=== Tries ===
	Player	Pl	T
1	Charlie White	15	11
2	Lonnie Spragg	11	9
3	Walter Davis	15	8
4	C McCoy	13	7
5	HD Thompson	11	7
6	William Hardcastle	13	7
7	Iggy O'Donnell	17	6
8	P Hourigan	13	6
9	E Quinsey	11	6
10	E Shaw	14	5

- Statistics include finals matches.

== Lower grades ==
The MRFU also conducted Second Grade and Third Grade competitions.

=== Second Grade ===
The following teams were involved in the Second Grade competition in 1899: Adelphi, Arncliffe, Endeavour, Glebe, Manly Federal, Mosman, Newtown, North Sydney, Permanent Artillery, Redfern Waratah, South Sydney, Sydney University B, Wallaroo II, Waverley. At the conclusion of the season, Glebe and South Sydney faced each other in the final. The game was drawn with a replay organised for a later date. Glebe won the replay 14 to 3 and were declared premiers.

=== Third Grade ===
The following teams were involved in the Third Grade competition in 1899: Balmain Carlingford, Bondi, Botany, Burwood, East Sydney, Forest Lodge Cambridge, Hurstville, Manly Wentworth, Newtown II, Pioneer, Strathfield, Sydney University III, Warrigal, Waverley Oaks, Permanent Artillery, South Sydney II, Redfern Waratah II. At the conclusion of the season, Forest Lodge Cambridge beat Waverley Oaks in the final 10 to 6.

== Participating clubs ==
Club	Grade		
Club	Sen	2nd	3rd
Adelphi Football Club		Y	
Arncliffe Football Club		Y	
Balmain Carlingford Football Club			Y
Bondi Football Club			Y
Botany Football Club			Y
Buccaneer Football Club	Y		
Burwood Football Club			Y
East Sydney Football Club			Y
Endeavour Football Club		Y	
Forest Lodge Cambridge Football Club			Y
Glebe Football Club		Y	
Hurstville Football Club			Y
Manly Federal Football Club		Y	
Manly Wentworth Football Club			Y
Marrickville Football Club	Y		
Mosman Football Club		Y	
Newtown Football Club		Y	Y
North Sydney Football Club		Y	
Parramatta Rugby Football Club	Y		
Permanent Artillery Football Club		Y	Y
Pioneer Football Club			Y
Pirates Football Club	Y		
Randwick Football Club	Y		
Redfern Waratah Football Club		Y	Y
South Sydney Football Club		Y	Y
Strathfield Football Club			Y
Sydney Football Club	Y		
Sydney University Football Club	Y	Y	Y
Wallaroo Football Club	Y	Y	
Warrigal Football Club			Y
Waverley Football Club		Y	
Waverley Oaks Football Club			Y
