= Norman Street =

Norman Street may refer to:

- Norm Street (1876–1963), Australian rugby union player
- Norman Street (cricketer) (1881–1915), English soldier and cricketer
