= Alf Bucher =

British Isles & Scotland international rugby union player

- Born: Alfred Moore Bucher; 22 March 1874 Leith, Scotland
- Died: 20 August 1939 (aged 65) Edinburgh, Scotland

Rugby union career
- Position: Wing
Amateur team(s)
Years	Team	Apps	(Points)
- Edinburgh Academicals RFC
Provincial / State sides
Years	Team	Apps	(Points)
- Edinburgh District
International career
Years	Team	Apps	(Points)
1897	Scotland	1	(3)
1899	British Isles	3	(9)

Alfred "Alf" Moore Bucher (22 March 1874 – 20 August 1939) was a Scottish international rugby union wing who played club rugby for Edinburgh Academicals. Bucher played international rugby for Scotland and was selected for the British Isles team on its 1899 tour of Australia.

== Personal history ==
Bucher was born in Leith, in 1874 to Francis Bucher and Grace Webster Smith. Bucher served in the First World War and was a 2nd Lieutenant in the City of Edinburgh Motor Volunteer Corps.

== Rugby Union career ==
=== Amateur career ===
Bucher came to note as a rugby player while representing Scottish club side, Edinburgh Academicals. It was while with the Academicals that he was selected to win his one and only cap for the Scottish national team.

=== Provincial career ===
He was capped by Edinburgh District in 1898.

=== International career ===
Bucher was chosen for the final game of the 1897 Home Nations Championship, an encounter against England at Fallowfield in Manchester. Bucher was brought in at wing as a replacement for George Campbell, and was joined at threequarters with fellow Academical player Alec Robertson, who was also winning his first cap. Scotland lost the game 12–3, and despite scoring a try on his debut, Bucher was never reselected for his country again.

In 1899, Bucher was invited to represent the British Isles on the team's first official tour to Australia. Bucher played in 17 of the 20 arranged matches, and was part of the British Isles team in the First Test against Australia, played in Sydney. After the tourists lost the First Test, captain Matthew Mullineux made several team changes, and Bucher was replaced by H.G.S. Gray, a trialist who normally played as a forward. Despite a comprehensive win in the Second Test, Gray was dropped for the Third Test and Bucher was back on the wing, this time partnered opposite Elliot Nicholson. Bucher scored two tries in the game, which proved decisive as the British won by a narrow 11-10 margin. Bucher retained his place for the Final Test, and scored his third international try of the tour in as 13–0 win over the Australians.
