= John Francomb =

British Lions international rugby union player

- Born: John Stanley Francomb; 1873 Blackburn, England
- Died: 1915 (aged 41–42) Buxton, England

Rugby union career
- Position: Forward
Amateur team(s)
| Years | Team | Apps | (Points) |
- Manchester Rugby Club
| – | Sale | | |
| – | Lancashire | | |
| – | Barbarian F.C. | | |
International career
| Years | Team | Apps | (Points) |
| 1899 | British Isles | 1 | (0) |

John Stanley Francomb (1873–1915) was an English international rugby union forward who played club rugby for Manchester and Sale. Francomb played international rugby for the British Isles on their 1899 tour of Australia.

== Rugby career ==
Of the 1899 touring British Team, Francomb is one of the least reported members. Tour captain Matthew Mullineux, described Francomb as 'an old Oxford man', though there is no record of him representing the Oxford University team in any of the Varsity Matches. Mullineux goes on to describe Francomb as '...very tall, and wants a lot of stopping when he gets "going"'; common traits for early forward players. At the time of the Australian tour, Francomb was playing club rugby for Manchester and county rugby for Lancashire.

Francomb played in nine matches of the Australia tour, which included one Test against the Australian national team. Francomb was not selected for the first game of the tour, but played in the second game against the New South Wales Waratahs. He kept his placed for the next game played against a Metropolitan team before he played his one and only international game, in the First Test against Australia. The tourists lost 13–3, and Mullineux reacted by dropping himself, Francomb and Esmond Martelli from future Test games. Despite being dropped from the Test games, Francomb played in six further matches against invitational and state teams.

During the 1898/99 season Francomb was also invited to join British touring team the Barbarians. The next notable rugby event Francomb was involved in took place six years later, when he was playing for Sale; he was chosen to play for the Cheshire team to face the 1905 New Zealand team on their tour of Britain.

== Personal Life and Death ==
His father was the Mayor of Warrington 1899-1901 and a Conservative Councilllor and Alderman. Stanley was a Manchester solicitor and law clerk to the Winwick Asylum Committee. His wife, Dorothea nee Churchyard who he married in 1906, died aged 29, of Ptomaine poisoning attributed to eating beef in 1909, shortly after giving birth to a daughter. The inquest ruled accidental death, but Francomb was censured by the judge for turning up late. They had previously had a son in 1907, but he was born prematurely and no record exists on whether he survived. Francomb died at Davos Mount, Buxton, on August 1915. He suffered an epileptic seizure on August 15, 1915 and fell while holding a saucer, which broke and severely cut his throat, leading to fatal bleeding. An inquest determined his death was accidental.

== Bibliography ==
- Griffiths, John (1990). British Lions. Swindon: Crowood Press. ISBN 1-85223-541-1.
