= Frederick Belson =

English rugby union player

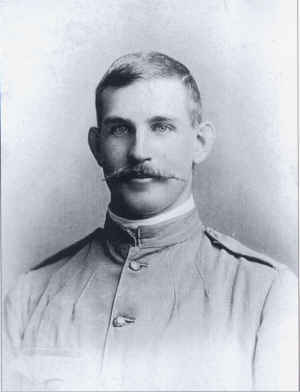
- Belson in his Boer War uniform
- Born: Frederick Charles Belson; 13 February 1874 Ramsgate, England
- Died: 10 August 1952 (aged 78) Portsmouth, England
- School: Clifton College
- Occupation: Banker

Rugby union career
- Position: Forward
Amateur team(s)
Years	Team	Apps	(Points)
1891-1894	Clifton		
1894-1899	Bath		
1896-1897	Bristol		
1896-1897	Abergavenny RFC		
International career
Years	Team	Apps	(Points)
1899	British Isles	1	(0)

Frederick Charles Belson (13 February 1874 – 10 August 1952) was an English international rugby union forward who played club rugby for Clifton and Bath, and county rugby for Somerset. Belson played international rugby for the British Isles on their 1899 tour of Australia.

== Personal life ==
Belson was born in Ramsgate in Kent in 1874 to Berkley George A. Belson, a retired Royal Navy Commander originally from Woolwich and Sarah Belson from New South Wales, Australia. His family were originally from Portsmouth, but Belson moved to the South-West of England as a child, where he was educated at Clifton College. As an adult he entered the banking profession and worked for the National Provincial Bank. He followed a banking career for several years taking up positions around the Somerset and Wiltshire areas, and even took a post in Abergavenny in Wales in 1896; but by 1897 he was back in Somerset. In 1899, Belson was invited to join the British Isles rugby team on their tour of Australia, but was denied the six-month leave by his employers. He decided to take the opportunity regardless, and left for Australia in May that year, understanding his job was forfeit. In September 1899, a month after the end of the rugby tour, the Bath Chronicle reported that Belson had taken an appointment in Sydney, showing a commitment to stay in Australia.

In 1900, Belson joined the newly formed Imperial Yeomanry, and travelled to South Africa to serve the British Army in the Second Boer War. He joined Thorneycroft's Mounted Infantry, and reached the rank of Lieutenant. He left South Africa on 16 July 1902, leaving Cape Town on the SS Canada and returned to Britain a war invalid. Between leaving Africa and the outbreak of the First World War, Belson moved to British Columbia in Canada, but returned to Britain to serve his country after the outbreak of war in 1914. He joined the Royal Army Service Corps, but did not appear to have seen active duty. During the War years Belson saw the birth of two sons, in 1916 and 1917. Between 1920 and 1924, he returned to British Columbia to continue his governmental duties. He died in Southsea in 1952.

== Rugby career ==
Belson joined Clifton RFC in 1891 and continued playing for the team until 1894 when he began playing for Bath. After his banking job was moved to Wales in 1896, he played several games for Abergavenny RFC, but was back in the Bath team by February 1897. During the same period (late 1896 to early 1897), Belson is also recorded as playing several games for Bristol. In September 1897, Belson turned out for a trial game for Newport RFC, but there are no records of him playing a full game for the senior XV.

In 1899 Belson was invited to join Matthew Mullineux's British Isles team, on their tour of Australia. There is conflicting evidence to how many games Belson played out of the 21 matches of the tour, ranging from four to seven. There is no doubt over Belson's single international game, and all sources state that he played in the First Test against Australia.

== Bibliography ==
- Thomas, Clem; updated by Thomas, Greg (2001). The History of The British and Irish Lions. Mainstream Books. p. 21. ISBN 1-84018-498-1.
