= Charles Corfe (headmaster) =

Cricketer and teacher

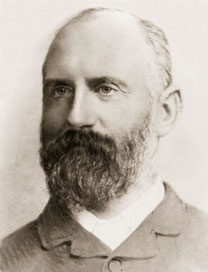

Personal information
- Full name: Charles Carteret Corfe
- Born: 8 June 1847; Guernsey
- Died: 26 June 1935 (aged 88); Peterborough, England
- Batting: Right-handed
- Relatives: Arthur Corfe (son)

Domestic team information
- Years: Team
- 1871–72 to 1883–84: Canterbury

Career statistics
| Competition | First-class |
|---|---|
| Matches | 8 |
| Runs scored | 235 |
| Batting average | 19.58 |
| 100s/50s | 0/1 |
| Top score | 88 |
| Balls bowled | 280 |
| Wickets | 5 |
| Bowling average | 9.40 |
| 5 wickets in innings | 1 |
| 10 wickets in match | 0 |
| Best bowling | 5/22 |
| Catches/stumpings | 2/0 |
- Source: CricketArchive, 7 October 2014

Charles Carteret Corfe (8 June 1847 – 26 June 1935) was a cricketer in New Zealand and a school headmaster in New Zealand and Australia.

== Early life ==
Corfe's father Arthur Thomas Corfe was the headmaster at Elizabeth College in Guernsey, where Charles gained his school education. He then studied mathematics at Jesus College, Cambridge, gaining his BA degree in 1869. He won athletics blues in 1867, 1868 and 1869.

== Teaching career ==
Corfe went to New Zealand to teach at Christ's College in Christchurch in 1871. He was headmaster at Christ's College from 1873 to 1888. His resignation was forced by the board as they wanted to see a classically trained cleric at the helm of the school rather than a scientist. However, he received high praise from the Christ's College Register in his obituary. One of the school's houses—Corfe House—is named for him. Among Corfe's initiatives at Christ's College were the gymnasium, the swimming pool, the chapel organ, the cadet corps and the annual athletic sports.

Corfe went from Christchurch to Toowoomba Grammar School in Queensland, where he was headmaster from 1890 to 1900. The Year 7 boarding house, Corfe House, is named after him. He later occupied relieving positions at schools in Australasia, including at Christ's College during the First World War, for which he refused to accept payment.

== Cricket career ==
Corfe played first-class cricket for Canterbury from 1871 to 1884. In 1875 against Otago he scored 88 in a little over two hours from "some really fine cricket, playing the bail balls from all the bowlers well down, and hitting well when a chance offered". It was the highest first-class individual score in New Zealand until George Watson of Canterbury made the first century in 1881. The Canterbury Cricket Association adopted their colours of red and black in honour of Corfe's college at Cambridge.

== Personal life ==
Corfe married Emily Hudson Evison in St Paul's Cathedral, Melbourne, on 17 December 1874. They had four sons and a daughter. After the First World War they lived in the Christchurch suburb of Sumner, but when Emily died, Charles went back to England and lived with his widowed daughter for the last seven years of his life.
