= Charles Thompson (rugby union, born 1874) =

British Isles international rugby union player

- Born: Charles Edward K. Thompson
- Died: Lancashire, England

Rugby union career
- Position: Fullback
Amateur team(s)
Years	Team	Apps	(Points)
- Manchester Rugby Club
–	Barbarian F.C.		
–	Lancashire		
International career
Years	Team	Apps	(Points)
1899	British Isles	3	(0)

Charles Edward Thompson (1874 – ?) was an English international rugby union fullback who played club rugby for Manchester and county rugby for Lancashire. Thompson was selected for the British Isles team on its 1899 tour of Australia, but despite representing Great Britain, never played international rugby for England.

== Rugby career ==
Thompson first came to note as a rugby player through his selection in the 1899 British Isles team that toured Australia. He was uncapped before his selection, and did not have the distinction of an Oxford or Cambridge sporting 'Blue', a factor common to many of the touring party. The players were normally chosen at this early stage of touring parties, on sporting ability and just as importantly on the ability to take an unpaid five-month leave of absence.

Thompson was described by his tour captain Matthew Mullineux, as having 'a good kick' and having the ability to play at three-quarters and in the forwards. This would have made Thompson an all round player, because as a specialist full back, the only positions on the pitch excluded by his captain were at half-back. Thompson played in 13 games of the British Isles tour, including three Test matches against the Australian national team. Thompson was not selected for the first test in Sydney, with Mullineaux selecting Esmond Martelli at full back. The British team lost the opener, and Mullineux reacted by reshuffling his squad, including dropping himself from future Test games, and also selecting Thompson rather than Martelli. Mullineux's tactics resulted in the British Isles winning the remaining three Tests, and Thompson finishing the tour with three international wins.

When selected for the British Isles, Thompson is listed as representing Lancashire, but in the 1900/01 season he is listed as playing for northern team, Manchester Rugby Club. While at Manchester, he was approached by the Barbarians, an invitational touring team that played within Britain. Thompson accepted the invitation becoming one of the earliest members of the club.
