= H. G. S. Gray =

British Isles international rugby union player

Hugh Gray
- Born: Hugh Grainger Stewart Gray; 10 August 1875 North Berwick, East Lothian
- Died: 1955 South Africa

Rugby union career
- Position: Forwards
Amateur team(s)
Years	Team	Apps	(Points)
- Coventry RFC
International career
Years	Team	Apps	(Points)
1899	British Isles	2	(0)

Hugh Grainger Stewart Gray (10 August 1875 – 1955) was a Scottish player on the 1899 British Isles tour to Australia (often referred to as the England team). He was never capped for Scotland, but had appeared in the Scottish Trials.

In 1899, Gray was invited to represent the British Isles on the team's first official tour to Australia. After the tourists lost the First Test, captain Matthew Mullineux made several team changes, and Alf Bucher was replaced by Gray, a trialist who normally played as a forward. Despite a comprehensive win in the Second Test, Gray was dropped for the Third Test and Boucher was back on the wing.

He normally played as a forward, but went on the wing for one of his games against Australia.

Gray played for Coventry RFC in England.

== Bibliography ==
- Bath, Richard (ed.) (2007). The Scotland Rugby Miscellany. Vision Sports Publishing. ISBN 1-905326-24-6.
