= Bill Webb (rugby union) =

Australia international rugby union player

- Born: William Phillips Webb; 18 March 1868 Dunedin, New Zealand
- Died: c. 1931 Sydney, Australia
- School: Otago Boys' High School

Rugby union career
- Position: Forward
Amateur team(s)
Years	Team	Apps	(Points)
1888	Zingari-Richmond		
1894–96, 98–1900	Wallaroo		
Provincial / State sides
Years	Team	Apps	(Points)
1888	Otago		
1894–96, 98–1900	New South Wales		
International career
Years	Team	Apps	(Points)
1899	Australia	2	(0)

William Phillips Webb (18 March 1868 - c. 1931) was a New Zealand-born rugby union player who represented Australia.

Webb, a forward, was born in Dunedin, New Zealand and attended Otago Boys' High School. Webb played for Otago in 1888 coming out of the Zingari-Richmond club. He moved to Sydney in 1894 and joined the Wallaroo club. He was described as being a "powerfully built backrow forward".

In 1899 Webb was in the New South Wales team which faced the touring British Lions. Based on his performance he was then selected for the final two matches for Australia against the tourists.
