= Guy Evers =

British Lions international rugby union player

- Born: Guy Vincent Evers; 22 November 1874 Stourbridge, England
- Died: 29 May 1959 (aged 84) Stourbridge, England
- School: Haileybury

Rugby union career
- Position: Forward
Amateur team(s)
Years	Team	Apps	(Points)
- Moseley Rugby Club
–	Barbarian F.C.		
International career
Years	Team	Apps	(Points)
1899	British Isles	3	(0)

Guy Vincent Evers (22 November 1874 – 29 May 1959) was an English international rugby union forward who played club rugby for Moseley. Evers played international rugby for the British Isles on their 1899 tour of Australia

== Personal history ==
Evers was born in Stourbridge in 1874, the fourth son of Frank Evers and Isobel Smith. He was educated at Haileybury. On returning from his rugby tour of Australia, Evers took up work in Amblecote with E.J. & J. Pearson Ltd., a fireclay mines and works business. In 1902 he was made a director of the company, and remained with the company for his entire working life. In 1926 Evers applied for a British patent, on behalf of the company, for an improved kiln. He was a keen canoeist and in the dedication to William Bliss's "Rapid Rivers" published in 1935, it states "To Guy V. Evers and his Companions who have canoed more English rivers than I have adventured upon".

== Rugby career ==
Evers played club rugby mainly for Moseley, but he was also selected for a Rest of South team to face London and the Universities. In 1899, Evers was invited to join Matthew Mullineux's British Isles team to tour Australia. Evers missed the First Test against Australia, which the tourists lost 13–3. After the defeat, Mullineux dropped himself from the Test team, and brought five new players in for the Second Test at Brisbane, Evers being one of them. After the British Isles beat the Australians in the Second Test, Evers found himself chosen for the final two Tests, both resulting in wins for the tourists.

On returning to Britain, Evers returned to club rugby at Moseley, and in 1902 he was invited to join invitational team the Barbarians. Although representing Britain, Evers was never selected to represent his home nation of England.

== Bibliography ==
- Thomas, Clem (2001). The History of The British and Irish Lions. Updated by Thomas, Greg. Mainstream Books. pp. 100–117. ISBN 1-84018-498-1.
