= Arthur Corfe =

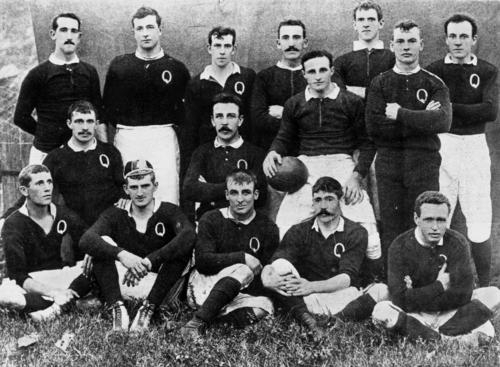
- Corfe appears back row second from right, after the 1 July Queensland match against the 1899 British Lions.
- Born: Arthur Cecil Corfe; 5 December 1878 Christchurch
- Died: 30 January 1949 (aged 70) St Pancras

Rugby union career
Provincial / State sides
Years	Team	Apps	(Points)
1899	Queensland		
International career
Years	Team	Apps	(Points)
1899	Australia	1	(0)

Lieutenant Colonel Arthur Cecil Corfe DSO** (5 December 1878 – 30 January 1949) was a New Zealand-born Australian military officer and rugby union player who made state and international representative appearances for Australia in 1899.

== Rugby union ==
Corfe was born in Christchurch, where his father, Charles Corfe, was the principal of Christ's College. The family moved to Queensland when Charles took over as principal of Toowoomba Grammar School in 1890.

A flanker, Corfe claimed one international rugby cap for Australia during the inaugural Test series played by Australian representative sides. His debut game was against Great Britain, at Brisbane, on 22 July 1899 during the 1899 British Lions tour to Australia. Three weeks earlier he had made a state appearance for Queensland against those same tourists.

== Military service ==
Corfe served with the 3rd Queensland Mounted Infantry in the Boer War in South Africa. In the First World War, he received the Distinguished Service Order in the 1917 Birthday Honours while serving as a major with the South African Defence Force, while commanding the Royal West Kent Regiment. He was promoted to lieutenant colonel in 1917.

He was awarded two additional bars to the DSO for further service, the first in January 1918, "For conspicuous gallantry and devotion to duty when in command of his battalion," and the second in March 1918:

For conspicuous gallantry and devotion to duty when in command of his battalion during an attack. The assaulting troops in front were checked by heavy rifle fire from a strong point. He at once went forward, and by his inspiring presence and personal leadership reduced the strong point and tilled the occupants. He was severely wounded, but continued to advance until exhausted from loss of blood. His splendid example was of the highest value at a critical moment.

— The London Gazette, 19 March 1918

He returned to service following his injury and he was attached to the South Wales Borderers. After the war, he received the Croix de Guerre in December 1919. He remained in the reserves until 1933 when he reached the retirement age of 55.
