= Bertie Doran =

Irish rugby union player

- Full name: Bertie Ribton White Doran
- Born: 16 November 1878 Dublin, Ireland
- Died: 22 February 1948 (aged 69) Dublin, Ireland
- School: The High School
- Occupation: Solicitor

Rugby union career
- Position: Centre
International career
Years	Team	Apps	(Points)
1900–02	Ireland	8	(3)

Bertie Ribton White Doran (16 November 1878 — 22 February 1948) was an Irish international rugby union player.

Raised in Dublin, Doran was educated at The High School and played for local club Lansdowne.

Doran was capped eight times for Ireland as a centre between 1900 and 1902. He made three appearances with his brother Gerry as one of his three-quarter partners and had another brother Eddie who represented Ireland.

A practising solicitor, Doran served as president of Lansdowne and was a vice-president of the IRFU.

== See also ==
- List of Ireland national rugby union players
