= Tom McGown =

Irish rugby union player

- Born: Thomas Melville Watson McGown; 22 February 1876 Belfast, Ireland
- Died: 15 July 1956 (aged 80) High Wycombe, England
- School: Merchiston Castle School
- University: Clare College, Cambridge

Rugby union career
- Position: Forward
Amateur team(s)
Years	Team	Apps	(Points)
- Cambridge University R.U.F.C.
–	North of Ireland FC		
International career
Years	Team	Apps	(Points)
1899-1901	Ireland	3	(0)
1899	British Isles	4	(0)

Thomas Melville Watson McGown (22 February 1876 – 15 July 1956) was an Irish international rugby union forward who played club rugby for Cambridge University and North of Ireland FC. McGown played international rugby for Ireland and in 1899 he was selected for the British Isles team on its tour of Australia.

== Personal history ==
McGown was born in Belfast in 1876, and was educated at Merchiston Castle School in Scotland, before being accepted into Clare College, Cambridge in 1894. He gained his Bachelor of Arts in 1897 and served as a solicitor to the Supreme Court of Judicature in Ireland. He fought for the British Army during the First World War, serving in the Royal Army Ordnance Department. McGown reached the rank of Major holding the additional posts of Deputy Adjutant and Quartermaster-General. For his actions during the War, he was Mentioned in Dispatches.

== Rugby career ==
McGown first came to note as a rugby player when he began playing for Cambridge University. In 1896 he played in The Varsity Match, winning a sporting 'Blue'. On leaving University he joined North of Ireland F.C., and while representing the club he was first selected to play for the Ireland national team. His first international game was the 1899 Home Nations Championship encounter with England, played at home at Lansdowne Road. A good defence by Ireland gave them a 6–0 victory, their fourth successive win over the English. McGown was reselected for the next Ireland game, played away against Scotland. This was the first game to be played at Scotland's new ground in Inverleith, and resulted in the very first Irish win on Scottish soil. Although McGown was not present for the final game against Wales, the victory made him a Triple Crown winning player.

In 1899, McGown was invited to join the British Isles on the team's first official tour of Australia. McGown played in 19 of the 20 games of the tour, only missing the match against Maryborough. McGown played in all four Test Matches against Australia, though did not score in any of the 19 games he played in.

On returning to Ireland, McGown played in one final international for Ireland, a loss to Scotland in the 1901 Home Nations Championship.

== Bibliography ==
- Griffiths, John (1990). British Lions. Swindon: Crowood Press. ISBN 1-85223-541-1.
- Griffiths, John (1987). The Phoenix Book of International Rugby Records. London: Phoenix House. ISBN 0-460-07003-7.
