= Sine Boland =

- Born: Sinon Bernard Boland; 12 July 1875 Brisbane, Queensland
- Died: c. 1954

Rugby union career
Provincial / State sides
Years	Team	Apps	(Points)
- state
International career
Years	Team	Apps	(Points)
1899–03	Australia	3	(0)

Sinon Bernard "Sine" Boland (12 July 1875 – 1954), born Toowoomba, Queensland, was an Australian soldier, rower and rugby union player and one of the founders of Queensland Rugby League. In rugby union, he played for the Queensland and Australian team as a flanker and appeared in the inaugural series of Tests matches played by Australia in 1899. A Boer War and Gallipoli veteran, he once stood for the Queensland Parliament.

== Personal life and career ==
Boland was born in Toowoomba, near Brisbane in Queensland. He was the son of Edmund and Catherine (née Stapleton) Boland. His father, a butcher, had been born in Ireland, and was Mayor of Toowoomba in 1889 and 1897. Sinon was a member of the Brisbane Rowing Club and rowed for Queensland in intercolonial competition. He married Mary Kathleen Phillips in Brisbane in 1904, with whom he had three children: Bernard, Dudley and Paula. He worked as a clerk and fettler for Queensland Railways, starting as a 15-year-old apprentice clerk in 1891 and working his way up to be employed at Railway Commissioner’s Office in Brisbane. After serving in the Boer War and in World War One, Boland ran as an independent nationalist candidate for the seat of Inner Brisbane in 1919, but was not elected. Boland died on 3 August 1954.

== Rugby Union ==
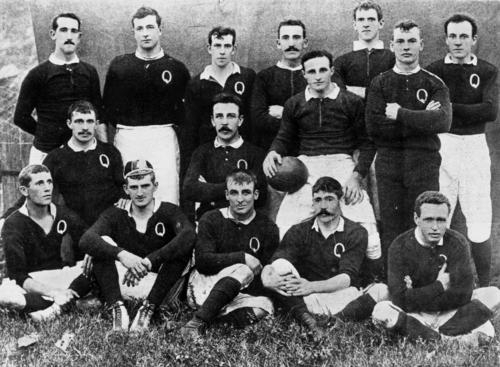
Boland appears front row in cap, after the 1 July Queensland match against the 1899 British Lions.

Boland played for the Past Grammar Schools Football Club in Brisbane, and went on to claim a total of 3 international rugby caps for Australia, playing in the first ever home Tests against the British Lions and the first ever Test Match against New Zealand. In 1899 he had his international debut in the 3rd Test of 1899 British Lions tour to Australia against Matthew Mullineux's British side in Sydney, on 5 August 1899. A week later he would play again in the 4th test. He had earlier made an appearance for Queensland against those same tourists. In Queensland Rugby Union’s 1932 Jubilee, Boland was named in the "Gallery of Great Players" for representing QLD on more than 10 occasions. He had played 15 matches for the state: 13 against NSW, one against Great Britain and one against New Zealand.

== Foundation of Rugby League ==
Boland was among the group of Brisbane rugby union players credited with starting Rugby League in Queensland. The group used to meet at the old 'Courier Corner' (the northern corner of Brisbane’s Queen and Edward Streets) to talk about football, and decided that the (English) 'Northern Rules' version of rugby should be started up in Queensland. According to the Queensland Rugby League history: "Upon returning to work one afternoon in February 1908, one of the group Sinan [sic] 'Siney' Boland, borrowed five pence from a workmate, so he could mail letters to six football colleagues – E.L. 'Buck' Buchanan, 'Mickey' J. Dore, John 'Jack' A. O’Connor, George W. Watson, Alf Faulkner, and Jack A. Fihelly" (Dore, Watson, Fihelly and Boland were all former rugby union Wallabies).

Boland invited his colleagues to attend a meeting to form a new football body, the Queensland Rugby Association, on 28 February 1908, at the Railway Hotel in Roma Street, Brisbane (renamed the Queensland Amateur Rugby League, on 8 March 1909). Boland was appointed as the first Secretary of the Executive Committee, with Alf Faulkner as Chairman/Treasurer.

== Military Service ==
Boland was awarded the Distinguished Service Order, ‘Mentioned in Despatches’ Award, and the Queen's South Africa Medal for his Boer War Service. In 1915, Boland enlisted in the Australian Army in the 2nd Light Horse and was appointed as a Captain. His regiment landed at Gallipoli in October, fighting a largely defensive campaign around Sari Bair and Suvla, and withdrawing with the evacuation of the Peninsular on 18 December, whereafter Boland returned to Egypt and was hospitalised before being returned to Australia as medically unfit.
