= George Cookson =

British Isles international rugby union player

- Born: George Cookson; 25 March 1874
- Died: 15 March 1950 (aged 75) Port Elizabeth, South Africa

Rugby union career
- Position: Half-back
Amateur team(s)
Years	Team	Apps	(Points)
- Manchester Rugby Club
–	Barbarian F.C.		
International career
Years	Team	Apps	(Points)
1899	British Isles	4	(0)

George Cookson (25 March 1874 – 15 March 1950) was an English international rugby union half-back who played club rugby for Manchester. Cookson was selected for the British Isles on the 1899 tour of Australia playing in all four Test matches.

== Rugby career ==
At the height of Cookson's rugby career, he was playing his club rugby for Manchester. He also played for Lancashire at county level, and gained a North of England cap in 1898. In 1899 he was approached by Matthew Mullineux to join the British Isles rugby tour of Australia. Cookson played in 18 of the tour matches and all four Test matches against the Australia national team. In the first Test he was partnered at centre with the tour captain, Mullineux, but after the team was defeated, Mullineux dropped himself from the team, bringing in Charlie Adamson from three-quarters to team-up with Cookson for the final three Tests. The selection tactic proved successful with the British winning the remaining contests with the Australian side.

On returning to Britain, Cookson continued to represent Manchester and in 1900 was invited to join British touring team the Barbarians. Despite being a British Isles player and being capped at North of England level, Cookson was never selected to play for the England national team.

== Bibliography ==
- Starmer-Smith, Nigel (1977). The Barbarians. Macdonald & Jane's Publishers. ISBN 0-86007-552-4.
