= Wallace Jarman =

British Lions & England international rugby union player

- Born: John Wallace Jarman Towcester, England
- Died: Vancouver, British Columbia, Canada

Rugby union career
- Position: Forward
Amateur team(s)
Years	Team	Apps	(Points)
- Bristol
International career
Years	Team	Apps	(Points)
1900	England	1	(0)
1899	British Isles	4	(0)

John Wallace Jarman (15 July 1872 – September 1950) was an English international rugby union forward who played club rugby for Bristol. Jarman played international rugby for England and was selected for the British Isles on their 1899 tour of Australia.

== Rugby career ==
Jarman came to note as a rugby player while representing Bristol at club level; and was captaining the team by time he was approached to play in Matthew Mullineux's British Isles team. Jarman was a major part of the touring team, and played in 18 of the 20 matches, including all four Test Matches against Australia. Jarman scored just a single try throughout the tour, in the third match of the series against Metropolitan at Sydney.

On his return to Britain, Jarman was selected to play for the England national team. Jarman played just one game for England, the opening match of the 1900 Home Nations Championship against Wales at Kinsholm in Gloucester. England introduced 13 new caps for this game, and Jarman was the only player out of the eight man pack to have any international experience. England lost the game 13-3 and Jarman never represented his country again.

== Bibliography ==
- Thomas, Clem; Thomas, Greg (2001). The History of The British and Irish Lions. Mainstream Books. pp. 100–117. ISBN 1-84018-498-1.
