= Elliot Nicholson =

British Lions & England international rugby union player

- Born: Elliot Tenbosch Nicholson; 13 December 1871 Derby, England
- Died: 1 December 1953 (aged 81) Wirral, England

Rugby union career
- Position: Wing
Amateur team(s)
Years	Team	Apps	(Points)
- Birkenhead Park
International career
Years	Team	Apps	(Points)
1899	British Isles	2	(0)
1900	England	2	(3)

Elliot Tenbosch Nicholson (13 December 1871 – 1 December 1953) was an English international rugby union wing who played club rugby for Birkenhead Park. Nicholson played international rugby for England and was selected for the British Isles team on its 1899 tour of Australia.

== Rugby career ==
Nicholson came to note as a rugby player while playing for Birkenhead Park, and in 1899 he became the first player form the club to represent the British Isles team; now known as the British Lions. Nicholson was selected for the British Isles tour of Australia, and was described by the team captain, Matthew Mullineux, as 'a very fast wing'. Nicholson was not chosen for either of the first two Tests against Australia, with captain Mullineux choosing Irish wing Gerry Doran; but in the Third Test Nicholson was brought into the squad. The British Isles won the Test by a narrow 11–10 score line, and Nicholson kept his place for the fourth and final test.

On his return to Britain, Nicholson found himself in favour with the English selectors and was brought into the England team for the 1900 Home Nations Championship. After losing all three games the previous Championship, the selectors brought in 13 new caps for the opening game, against Wales, and Nicholson was the only member of the threequarter line with any international experience. The game ended in a Welsh victory, although Nicholson scored his first and only international points during the match with a try. Despite losing the opening game, Nicholson was retained by the selectors for the second English game of the tournament, which was played at home to Ireland. England won the game 15–4, but Nicholson was dropped from the team for the next game, and never reselected for his country again.
