= George Ralph Gibson =

British Lions & England international rugby union player

George Gibson
- Born: George Ralph Gibson; March 1878 Gateshead, England
- Died: October 1939 (aged 60–61) Newcastle-on-Tyne, England

Rugby union career
- Position: Forward
Amateur team(s)
Years	Team	Apps	(Points)
- Northern Football Club
–	Barbarian F.C.		
International career
Years	Team	Apps	(Points)
1899-1901	England	2	(0)
1899	British Isles	4	

George Ralph Gibson (March 1878 – October 1939) was an English international rugby union forward who played club rugby for Northern. Gibson played international rugby for England and was selected to represent the British Isles on their 1899 tour of Australia. He was described by Matthew Mullineux, the British Isles captain, as a "capital worker".

== Biography ==
He was born in Gateshead, Durham into a rugby playing family. He was the brother of internationals Charles and Thomas Alexander Gibson.

== Rugby career ==
Gibson first came to note as a rugby player whilst a member of Northern Football Club; and in 1899 was selected to represent England in the Home Nations Championship. Gibson was brought into a fairly inexperienced pack to face Wales at St. Helen's. The game was a one-sided match, with Wales winning by 26-3; afterwards Gibson, along with the other Northern players in the pack, were described as "delinquents" by The Times. Gibson was not re-selected for any further games of the tournament.

Despite playing only the single game for England, he was offered a place on the British Isles team that was to tour Australia later in 1899. Although not fully representative of the best of British rugby players, the team included a few stand-out stars, including Welsh threequarter Gwyn Nicholls. Gibson played in all four Test matches against the Australian national team, which saw Britain recover after losing the First Test to take the series 3-1.

On his return to Britain, Gibson still had no position in the England team, but during the 1899-1900 season, he was invited to join the Barbarians. The Barbarians were an invitational touring team, who by 1900 had a tradition of touring South Wales. In 1900 Gibson was part of the team that beat Gwyn Nicholl's Cardiff 27-12, Gibson scoring a try during the game.

Gibson played one final international game when he was selected to play for England in the 1901 Home Nations Championship. England had already played two games of the series, both losses, and the selectors had responded to each defeat by making several changes to the squad. The lack of consistency failed to produce good results and Gibson's final game, against Scotland, also ended in English defeat.
