= Robert Challoner =

- Born: Robert Louis Challoner; 3 October 1872 Stratford-upon-Avon
- Died: 6 May 1955 (aged 82)
- School: Warwick School

Rugby union career
Provincial / State sides
Years	Team	Apps	(Points)
- New South Wales
International career
Years	Team	Apps	(Points)
1899	Australia	1	(0)

Robert Louis Challoner (3 October 1872 – 6 May 1955) was a rugby union player who represented for Australia.

Challoner, a number 8, was born in Stratford-upon-Avon and claimed a total of 1 international rugby caps for Australia. His debut game was against Great Britain, at Brisbane, on 22 July 1899 the second ever Test match played by an Australian national side

== Early life ==
Robert attended Warwick School, and in fact was in the same school rugby side as Sidney Nelson Crowther, the first Old Warwickian to gain international honours for Great Britain. Robert, after leaving school, emigrated to Australia and represented New South Wales and later Australia in the second test against a touring Great Britain side in 1899. Due to funding constraints he was one of only six New South Wales players ( with Charlie Ellis, Hyram Marks, Lonnie Spragg, Peter Ward & Bob McCowan) selected to make the trip to Brisbane four weeks after the historic first Test. His performance in that match was noted as excellent by the press.
