= Bob McCowan =

Australia international rugby union player

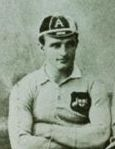
- Born: Robert Herman McCowan; 28 February 1875 Renfrewshire
- Died: 29 April 1941 (aged 66)
- School: Brisbane Grammar School
- Occupation: Solicitor

Rugby union career
Amateur team(s)
Years	Team	Apps	(Points)
- Past Grammar
Provincial / State sides
Years	Team	Apps	(Points)
1893-1900	Queensland		
International career
Years	Team	Apps	(Points)
1899	Australia	3	(0)

Robert Herman McCowan (28 February 1875 – 29 April 1941) was a pioneer Australian rugby union player, a state and national representative fullback who played in his country's first Test series of 1899, captaining the national side on one occasion.

== Personal life ==
McCowan was born in Renfrewshire, Scotland. He captained the rugby side at Brisbane Grammar School and after school played at the Past Grammars club.

He ran a successful law practice after his football career but in 1929 he got into some betting trouble with an unsuccessful plunge on Phar Lap in the 1929 Melbourne Cup. He was sentenced to fourteen years for misappropriating over 153,000 pounds from trust funds of clients over a 10-year period 1920-1929). He later worked as a bar-room cleaner.

He is buried in northern New South Wales at Byangum Road Cemetery in Murwillumbah in an unmarked grave.

== Representative career ==
Howell quotes sportswriter Jack Davis who described McCowan as "short, remarkably quick and good in any era....fast, clever in handling, kicking and passing the ball and tackles well...he possessed in high degree the essentials of a crack three-quarter".

McCowan was first selected in a Queensland representative side in 1893 and made 24 appearances for his state up till 1900. He captained the Queensland side in their tour match against Matthew Mullineux's first British Lions to tour Australia in 1899 to a surprise 11–3 victory. He captained Queensland on six other occasions and made appearances against touring New Zealand sides in 1893, 1896 and 1897. New Zealand dual-international George Smith came up against McCowan on the latter of these tours and was reported in The Cynic to have said "If it had not been for McCowan's fine play we would have put up much bigger scores than we did. He is the best fullback we have seen over here - kicks with either foot and is a very sure tackler - I know it".

His national representative debut came in the first Test match of that Lions 1899 tour when he was selected at fullback - this was Australian rugby union's inaugural Test match at the Sydney Cricket Ground on 24 June 1899 and the host team prevailed 13–3. Due to funding constraints he was one of only six New South Wales players (Charlie Ellis, Hyram Marks, Lonnie Spragg, Peter Ward & Robert Challoner) selected to make the trip to Brisbane four weeks later for the second Test. His performance in that match was noted as excellent by the press. With the incumbent skipper Frank Row left out of the team, McCowan was selected by his teammates to lead the side in the second Test match at the Brisbane Exhibition Ground. He again played at fullback in that game and then for the third Test in Sydney in August 1899 he was selected on the wing. He made no further national appearances in his career.

Zavos describes McCowan as the "finest fullback produced by Queensland" to that point and quotes contemporary commentators "stocky and dynamic, fast, very clever in handling, kicking and passing the ball and tackles well"

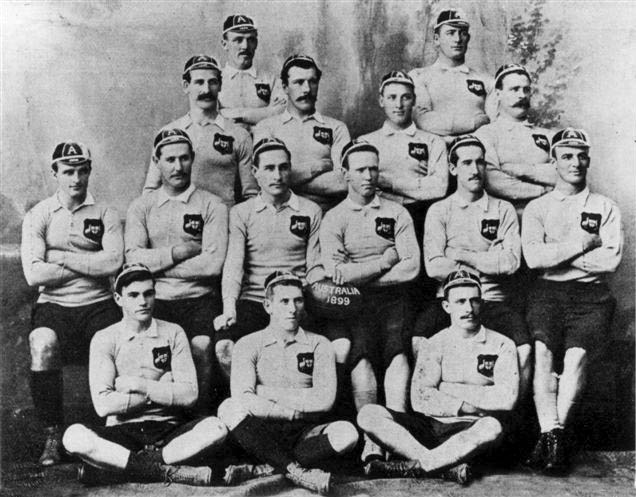
McCowan (2nd row, far left) with the inaugural Australian rugby union team 1899

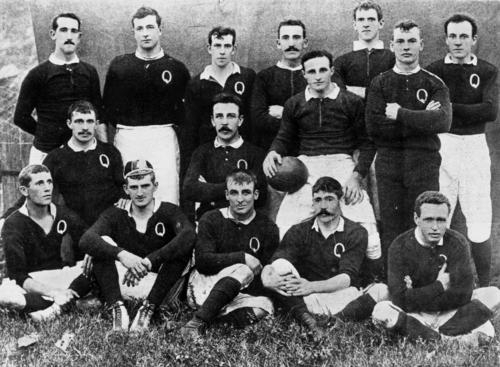
McCowan centre row with ball after captaining Queensland in 1 July Brisbane match against the 1899 British Lions.

Preceded by Frank Row	Australian national rugby union captain 1899	Succeeded by Stan Wickham

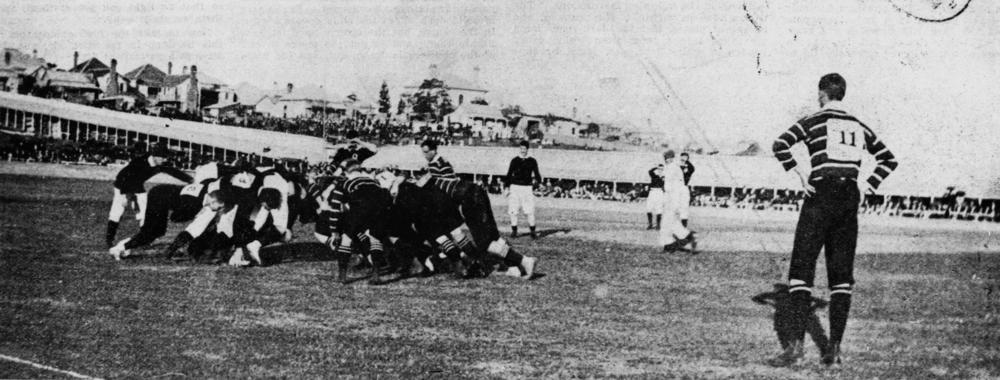
From the 2nd Test of 1899 when McCowan captained Australia

== Bibliography ==
- Collection (1995) Gordon Bray presents The Spirit of Rugby, Harper Collins Publishers Sydney
- Howell, Max (2005) Born to Lead - Wallaby Test Captains, Celebrity Books, Auckland NZ
- Zavos, Spiro (2000) The Golden Wallabies, Penguin, Victoria
