= Wally Cobb =

- Born: Walter George Cobb; 20 November 1870 Fremantle, Western Australia
- Died: 14 October 1933 (aged 62)

Rugby union career
- Position: fullback
International career
| Years | Team | Apps | (Points) |
| 1899 | Australia | 2 | (0) |

Walter George Cobb (20 November 1870 – 14 October 1933) was a rugby union player who represented New South Wales (now Waratahs) and Australia (now Wallabies).

Cobb, a fullback, was born in Fremantle in Western Australia and claimed a total of 2 international rugby caps for Australia in 1899. His debut game was against the British Lions at Sydney, on 5 August 1899. At the time Cobb was playing for the Newcastle Centrals club, making him the region's first Australian representative player.
