= Alan Ayre-Smith =

English rugby union player

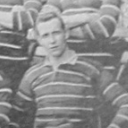
- Alan Ayre-Smith in Australia
- Born: Alan Ayre-Smith; 19 August 1876 Richmond, Yorkshire, England
- Died: 3 November 1957 (aged 81)
- University: Durham University; Guy's Hospital

Rugby union career
- Position: Forwards
Amateur team(s)
Years	Team	Apps	(Points)
- Guy's Hospital
International career
Years	Team	Apps	(Points)
1899	British Isles	4	(3)

Alan Ayre-Smith (19 August 1876 – 3 November 1957) was an English international rugby union forward who played club rugby for Guy's Hospital. Ayre-Smith played international rugby for the British Isles team on its 1899 tour of Australia.

== Personal history ==
From an old Sunderland family, Ayre-Smith was born in Richmond, Yorkshire in 1876 to Dr Robert Ayre-Smith and Catherine Jane Clarke (daughter of George Clark the founder of George Clark & NEM, both from Sunderland. He married Meta Turnbull and had one son and two daughters. Ayre-Smith was educated at Durham University, and gained his degree in Chemistry and Physics. He completed his medical training at Guy's Hospital in London. In 1900, as part of the British efforts during the Boer War, he traveled to South Africa and worked as a dresser in the Imperial Yeomanry Hospital under Dr Alfred Fripp. In later life he practiced medicine in Sunderland becoming the senior surgeon at the Sunderland Royal Hospital and the official doctor to Sunderland A.F.C.

== Rugby career ==
Ayre-Smith played club rugby for Guy's Hospital, and in 1899 he was selected to join Matthew Mullineux's British Isles team on the first official tour of Australia. Ayre-Smith played in 17 of the 20 tour matches and represented Britain in all four Test Matches against Australia. He played in the opening game of the tour, against Central Southern at Goulburn, New South Wales, before the team headed to Sydney. There he played against the New South Wales Waratahs, but missed the game against Metropolitan. Ayre-Smith was back in the team for the First Test, which the British Isles lost, 3–13. Ayre-Smith played in six of the seven invitational games between the First and Second Tests, where he was dropped from the game against Queensland, but scored his first try of the tour in the encounter with Rockhampton. Mullineux reacted to the First Test defeat, by dropping himself from the team, and moving Charlie Adamson in to his vacated half-back position for the Second Test. This was seen as the turning point of the tour and Ayre-Smith was not only part of a winning British team in the Second Test, but also scored his one and only international try during the game. Ayre-Smith played in both the final Test games, both played in Sydney and both resulting in British victories.

== Bibliography ==
- Griffiths, John (1990). British Lions. Swindon: Crowood Press. ISBN 978-1-85223-541-3.
