= Charlie Ellis =

Australian rugby union player

- Born: Charles L. Seymour Ellis; 18 January 1875 Newcastle, NSW
- Died: 31 December 1943 (aged 68)

Rugby union career
- Position(s): lock, flanker
International career
Years	Team	Apps	(Points)
1899	Australia	4	(0)

Charles L. Seymour Ellis (18 January 1875 – 31 December 1943) was a rugby union player who represented Australia.

Ellis, a lock and flanker, was born in Newcastle, New South Wales, and claimed a total of four international rugby caps for Australia. His debut game was against Great Britain, at Sydney on 24 June 1899, the inaugural rugby Test match played by an Australian national representative side. His last Test was in Australia v Great Britain at Sydney, 12 August 1899. Due to funding constraints he was one of only six New South Wales players (with Bob McCowan, Hyram Marks, Lonnie Spragg, Peter Ward and Robert Challoner) selected to make the trip to Brisbane four weeks later for the second Test. His performance in that match was noted as excellent by the press.

== Published references ==
- Collection (1995) Gordon Bray presents The Spirit of Rugby, Harper Collins Publishers Sydney
- Howell, Max (2005) Born to Lead - Wallaby Test Captains, Celebrity Books, Auckland NZ
