= Alex Kelly (rugby union) =

- Born: Alexander J. Kelly c. 1871 Sydney, NSW
- Died: c. 1913

Rugby union career
- Position: flanker
International career
Years	Team	Apps	(Points)
1899	Australia	1	(0)

Alexander J. Kelly (c. 1871 – c. 1913) was a rugby union player who represented Australia.

Kelly, a flanker, was born in Sydney, New South Wales and claimed one international rugby cap for Australia. His sole Test appearance was against Great Britain at Sydney on 24 June 1899, the inaugural rugby Test match played by an Australian national representative side.

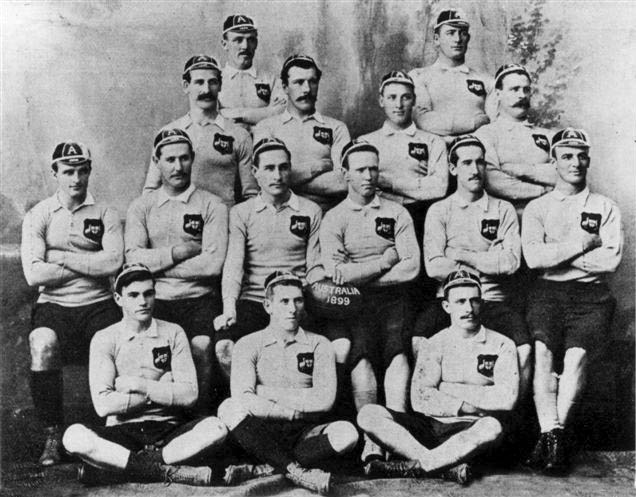
Kelly appeared in the inaugural Australian rugby union team, 1899

== Published references ==
- Collection (1995) Gordon Bray presents The Spirit of Rugby, HarperCollins Publishers Sydney
- Howell, Max (2005) Born to Lead – Wallaby Test Captains, Celebrity Books, Auckland NZ
