= Hyram Marks =

- Born: Hyam A. Marks; 8 June 1872 Sydney, NSW
- Died: 17 August 1957 (aged 85)
- School: Sydney Grammar School
- University: University of Sydney

Rugby union career
- Position: lock
Amateur team(s)
Years	Team	Apps	(Points)
- Sydney University
International career
Years	Team	Apps	(Points)
1899	Australia	2	(0)

Hyram A. Marks (8 June 1872 – 17 August 1957) was a rugby union player who represented Australia.

Marks, a lock, was born in Sydney, NSW and attended Sydney Grammar School and Sydney University. He claimed two international rugby caps for Australia and was the University rugby club's first Wallaby representative. His Test debut was against Great Britain, at Sydney, on 24 June 1899, the inaugural rugby Test match played by an Australian national representative side.

Due to funding constraints he was one of only six New South Wales players (Charlie Ellis, Bob McCowan, Lonnie Spragg, Peter Ward & Robert Challoner) selected to make the trip to Brisbane four weeks later for the second Test. His performance in that match was noted as "excellent" by the press.

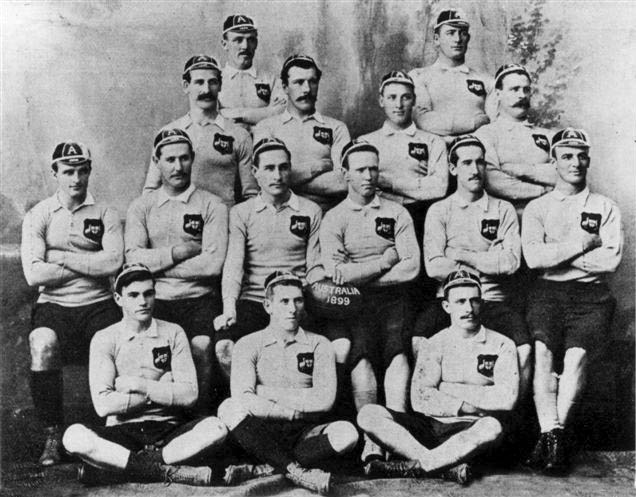
Marks appeared in the inaugural Australian rugby union team, 1899

== Sources ==
- Collection (1995) Gordon Bray presents The Spirit of Rugby, Harper Collins Publishers Sydney
- Howell, Max (2005) Born to Lead - Wallaby Test Captains, Celebrity Books, Auckland NZ
