= Gerry Doran =

Irish rugby union player

- Born: Gerald Percy Doran; 15 July 1877 Dublin, Ireland
- Died: 31 March 1943 (aged 65) Dún Laoghaire, Ireland
- Notable relative(s): Eddie Doran, brother Bertie Doran, brother
- Occupation: Articled clerk

Rugby union career
- Position: Wing
Amateur team(s)
Years	Team	Apps	(Points)
- Lansdowne Football Club
International career
Years	Team	Apps	(Points)
1899–1904	Ireland	8	(6)
1899	British Isles	2	(0)

Gerald "Gerry" Percy Doran (15 July 1877 – 31 March 1943) also known as Blucher Doran, was an Irish international rugby union wing who played club rugby for Lansdowne. Doran played international rugby for Ireland and in 1899 he was selected for the British Isles team on its tour of Australia. Doran's older brother Eddie and younger brother, Bertie, also played international rugby for Ireland.

Doran is most notable within rugby for scoring the winning try in the final game of the 1899 Home Nations Championship, which gave Ireland their second Triple Crown.

== Rugby career ==
Doran played all his international rugby while representing Lansdowne, captaining the club for two seasons between 1898 and 1900. His nickname within the club was Blucher, a reference to Field Marshal Gebhard Leberecht von Blücher, as he always arrived late.

Doran was first capped for Ireland in the country's second encounter of the 1899 Home Nations Championship, played away from home against Scotland. Ireland had begun the tournament with a win over England, but swapped out three of the four threequarter players for the game in Scotland. Doran was brought in on the wing opposite Edward Campbell, in a game which saw Ireland beat the Scottish on their own soil. Doran was reselected for the final game of the Championship, played against Wales at the Cardiff Arms Park. The game was a chaotic affair, interrupted several times as crowds overflowed onto the pitch. Doran scored the only points of the game, his first international try, which not only gave Ireland the Championship, but also the Triple Crown.

After the 1899 Championship victory, Doran was invited to tour Australia with Matthew Mullineux's British Isles team. Doran played in twelve of the twenty tour matches, and was chosen for the first two Test matches against the Australian national team. Although Doran failed to score in the Test matches he amassed six tries in the invitational games.

On his return to Britain, Doran was reselected for the Ireland national team, playing in the opening game of the 1900 Championship, a loss against England. Despite the loss, Doran was reselected for the very next match, his first international played in Ireland. The game was played at Lansdowne Road against Scotland, and is notable as being the first international game for Doran's brother, Bertie. Doran and Bertie played three international games together, though neither played with older brother Eddie, as his international career was over by 1890. Doran missed the 1901 Championship, but played in the final two games of the 1902 tournament, scoring a try in a win over Scotland, but then losing heavily to Wales. Doran played in two more international games, both ending in losses, to Wales in 1903 and against England in 1904.

== Bibliography ==
- Griffiths, John (1990). British Lions. Swindon: Crowood Press. ISBN 1-85223-541-1.
- Griffiths, John (1987). The Phoenix Book of International Rugby Records. London: Phoenix House. ISBN 0-460-07003-7.
