= Thomas Ward (rugby union) =

- Born: Thomas Ward; 2 December 1874 Brisbane, Queensland
- Died: c. 1942

Rugby union career
- Position: wing
International career
| Years | Team | Apps | (Points) |
| 1899 | Australia | 1 | (0) |

Thomas Ward (2 December 1874 – c. 1942) was a rugby union player who represented Australia.

Ward, a wing, was born in Brisbane, Queensland and claimed 1 international rugby cap for Australia. His debut game was against Great Britain, at Brisbane, on 22 July 1899.

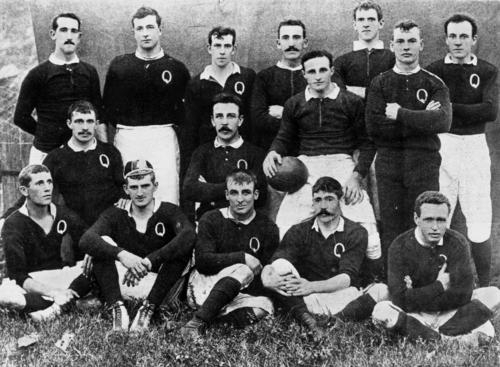
Ward shown back row 3rd from left, after the 1 July Queensland match against the 1899 British Lions.
