= Arch Boyd =

- Born: Archibald Boyd; 4 July 1872 Sydney, NSW
- Died: 1905 or 1902

Rugby union career
- Position: scrum-half
International career
Years	Team	Apps	(Points)
1899	Australia	1	(0)

Archibald Boyd (4 July 1872 – 1905 or 1902) was a rugby union player who represented Australia.

Boyd, a scrum-half, was born in Sydney and claimed 1 international rugby cap for Australia. His debut game was against Great Britain, at Sydney, on 5 August 1899.
