= Lonnie Spragg =

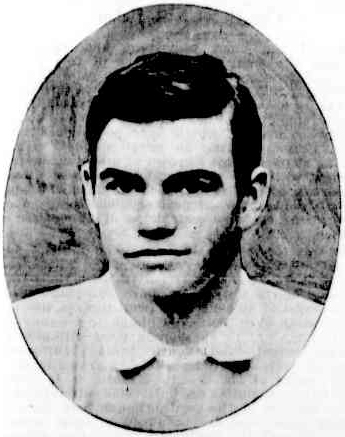
- Born: Alfonso Stephen Spragg; 2 October 1879 Redfern, New South Wales
- Died: 12 February 1904 (aged 24) Brisbane
- Height: 178 cm (5 ft 10 in)
- Weight: 73 kg (11 st 7 lb)
- Occupation: Banking

Rugby union career
- Position: centre
Amateur team(s)
| Years | Team | Apps | (Points) |
| 1900–1904 | Norths Brisbane | | |
Provincial / State sides
| Years | Team | Apps | (Points) |
| 1898–1899 | NSW | | |
| 1900- | Queensland | | |
International career
| Years | Team | Apps | (Points) |
| 1899 | Australia | 4 | (17) |

Alonzo Stephen "Lonnie" Spragg (2 October 1879 – 12 February 1904) was a rugby union player who represented Australia.

Spragg, a centre, was born in Redfern, New South Wales and claimed four international rugby caps for Australia (now Wallabies) while a member of Sydney's Wallaroo FC. He did not start playing rugby until he was seventeen and two years later he made his Test debut was against Great Britain, at Sydney, on 24 June 1899, the inaugural rugby Test match played by an Australian national representative side. Due to funding constraints he was one of only six New South Wales players (with Charlie Ellis, Hyram Marks, Bob McCowan, Peter Ward & Robert Challoner) selected to make the trip to Brisbane four weeks later for the second Test.

Zavos describes Spragg as a "crack three-quarter" and a "brilliant outside back". He quotes contemporary commentators describing Spragg as "possessing rare gifts, denoting a special aptitude for the game.....a splendid kick, either place or drop and eager and capable on defence" Spragg was rated the best goal kicker in the history of Australian rugby until the emergence of 'Dally' Messenger.

Spragg was also a state representative oarsman, and a cricketer who captained the Norths Brisbane Cricket Club. He also moved to Brisbane and played for the Queensland rugby team in 1900, having earlier been selected in games for NSW (now Waratahs). Spragg was in 1900 offered a contract by the Bradford "Northern Union" rugby club in England to play rugby league.

Spragg died in February 1904 at the age of 25, from appendicitis and peritonitis. A memorial was erected at Toowong Cemetery to his memory.

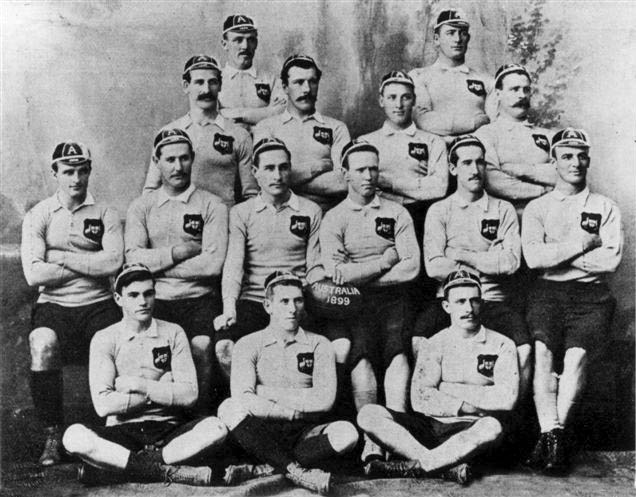
Spragg (front row, far left) in the inaugural Australian rugby union team 1899

== Published references ==
- Collection (1995) Gordon Bray presents The Spirit of Rugby, Harper Collins Publishers Sydney
- Howell, Max (2005) Born to Lead – Wallaby Test Captains, Celebrity Books, Auckland NZ
