= Patrick Carew =

Australian rugby union player

- Born: Patrick James S. Carew; 10 September 1876 Pine Mountain, Colony of Queensland
- Died: 31 March 1942 (aged 65)

Rugby union career
- Position(s): Lock, Prop
Amateur team(s)
Years	Team	Apps	(Points)
- City (Brisbane)
- Toowong (Brisbane)
1903–1904	Eastern Suburbs		
Provincial / State sides
Years	Team	Apps	(Points)
1898–1901	Queensland	17	
1903–1904	New South Wales		
International career
Years	Team	Apps	(Points)
1899	Australia	4	(0)

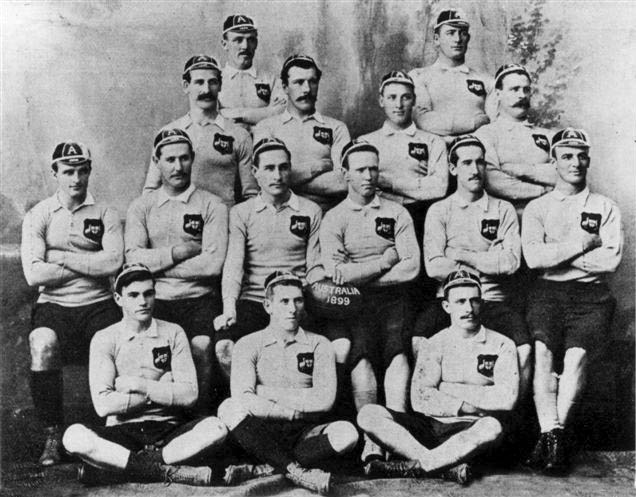
Carew back row right in the inaugural Australian rugby union team, 1899

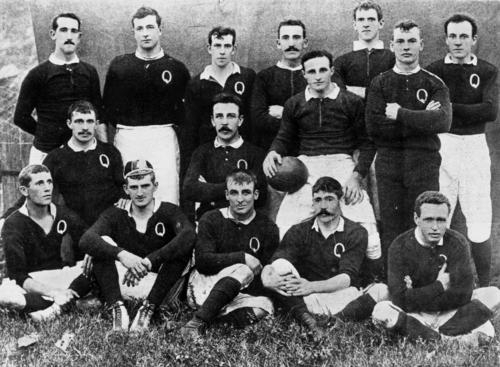
Carew appears back row 2nd from left, after the 1 July Queensland match against the 1899 British Lions.

Patrick James S. "Paddy" Carew (10 September 1875 – 31 March 1942) was an Australian rugby union national and state representative and a first-class cricketer and public servant. He was born in Pine Mountain in southern Queensland. He is officially recognised as Wallaby No. 1.

== Sporting life ==
Carew, a prop, claimed a total of four international rugby caps for Australia. All of those caps came in matches against Great Britain in 1899. His debut game was against Great Britain, at Sydney, on 24 June 1899, the inaugural rugby Test match played by an Australian national representative side. He was one of only five Queenslanders selected in that first Test. Four weeks later he played in the second Test at Brisbane. His performance in that match was noted as excellent by the press. He played in all four Tests of the series and made a Queensland state appearance against those same tourists in Brisbane on 1 July 1899.

Paddy represented Queensland in rugby from 1898 to 1901, and was named to the "Gallery of Great Players" on the occasion of Queensland Rugby Union's Jubilee in 1932 for representing the State on more than 10 occasions. He played a total of 17 matches: 16 against NSW as a forward and one against Great Britain. He captained Queensland in two games against NSW in 1901.

In 1903 Paddy joined Sydney's Eastern Suburbs Rugby Club and contributed to the club's first premiership that same year playing variously as a centre and forward. He was elected Easts' captain in 1904. He represented NSW against Queensland, and in 1903 against New Zealand.

At cricket he played as a right arm bowler and in five first-class matches with Queensland, between the 1899/1900 and 1902/03 seasons, took nine wickets at 35.77. His brother James also represented Queensland at cricket. He played for Toowong in Brisbane district cricket and in 1903 he scored 233 for the club against South Brisbane, setting the record highest individual score in Queensland district cricket.

== Later life ==
Carew made a career in local government administration, serving as Shire Clerk for the Warringah Shire Council in Sydney from 1907 to 1913. He had a long commercial career as manager of the Manly Brick and Tile Company. In 1930 returned to public service as the Town Clerk of Cobar, and briefly as Shire Clerk in Dalgety for a few months in 1932. Finally he became the Town Clerk of Queanbeyan in September 1932, a post he held until his death in 1942. He was instrumental in establishing the Queanbeyan Bowling Club in 1934.

== Published references ==
- Collection (1995) Gordon Bray presents The Spirit of Rugby, Harper Collins Publishers Sydney
- Howell, Max (2005) Born to Lead - Wallaby Test Captains, Celebrity Books, Auckland NZ

Government offices
Preceded by William S. Miller	Shire Clerk of Warringah; 1907–1913	Succeeded by Robert George Jamieson
Preceded by L. R. Humphries	Town Clerk of Cobar; 1930–1932	Succeeded by John McCormack
Preceded by T. N. Ayling	Shire Clerk of Dalgety; 1932	Succeeded by F. B. D'Arcey
Preceded by T. J. Murray	Town Clerk of Queanbeyan; 1932–1942	Succeeded by A. C. Turner
