= Charles Graham (rugby union) =

Australia international rugby union player

- Born: Charles Sydney Graham; 26 August 1868 Castlereagh, New South Wales
- Died: 8 September 1943 (aged 75)

Rugby union career
- Position: hooker
International career
Years	Team	Apps	(Points)
1899	Australia	1	(0)

Charles Sydney Graham (26 August 1868 – 8 September 1943) was a rugby union player who represented Australia.

Graham, a hooker, was born in Castlereagh New South Wales and claimed one international rugby cap for Australia. His debut game was against Great Britain, at Brisbane, on 22 July 1899.
