= Frank Row =

Australia international rugby union player

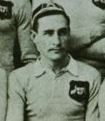
- Born: Frank Leonard Row; 25 January 1877 Dalby, Queensland
- Died: 28 January 1950 (aged 73)
- School: Sydney Boys High
- Notable relative: Norm Row

Rugby union career
Amateur team(s)
Years	Team	Apps	(Points)
- Manly Federal Football Club
Provincial / State sides
Years	Team	Apps	(Points)
1896-1902	New South Wales	10	(0)
International career
Years	Team	Apps	(Points)
1899	Australia	3	(0)

Frank Leonard Row (25 January 1877 – 28 January 1950) was a pioneer Australian rugby union player, a New South Wales (NSW) state and national representative centre who was his country's first Test captain in 1899, leading the national side on three occasions.

== Early life and club rugby ==
Born in Dalby, Queensland Row's father William had emigrated from England and settled in Queensland in 1864 to farm. The family moved to Sydney and after his schooling at Sydney Boys High School, Row played for Manly Federals and Sydney's Wallaroo FC. In early 1900 he moved to New Zealand where he continued to play rugby, captaining a Wellington side. He returned to Sydney in 1902 where he turned out for the North Sydney club. His younger brother Norman Row was also a Wallaby representative from 1907 to 1910.

== Representative career ==
Row was first selected in a New South Wales representative side in 1896 and he played ten games in total for his state up till 1902. In 1899 he served as captain of New South Wales on four occasions.

He played at fullback for New South Wales against Matthew Mullineux's first British Lions to tour Australia with the hosts going down narrowly 4-3. He was then selected at centre in a Sydney Metropolitan side who played against the same tourists days later, in which game he kicked a conversion. Consequently, Row was selected at centre for the first Test of the tour - Australian rugby union's inaugural Test match - played at the Sydney Cricket Ground on 24 June 1899. The players in those days elected their captain and chose Row, Queensland-born but a New South Wales resident. Few New South Welshman were sent north to Queensland for the second Test match of the tour a month later and although he was the incumbent skipper, Row was not selected. He was picked again in the centres and led the side in the third and fourth Tests of the tour played in Sydney in August 1899 both losses to Australia. His Test record therefore was three appearances, all as captain for one win and two losses.

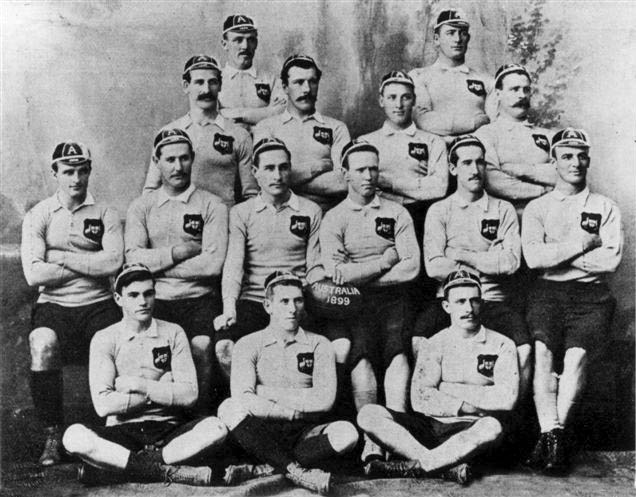
Rowe (2nd row, 3rd from left) captaining the Australian rugby union team 1899 (image: Rugby Australia Archives)

Preceded by Inaugural	Australian national rugby union captain 1899	Succeeded by Bob McCowan

== Bibliography ==
- Collection (1995) Gordon Bray presents The Spirit of Rugby, Harper Collins Publishers Sydney
- Howell, Max (2005) Born to Lead - Wallaby Test Captains, Celebrity Books, Auckland NZ
- Zavos, Spiro (2000) The Golden Wallabies, Penguin, Victoria
