= Austin Gralton =

Australia international rugby union player

- Born: Austin Sarsfield Ireland Gralton; 9 February 1871 Kempsey, NSW
- Died: 1 July 1919 (aged 48)
- School: St. Joseph's College, Gregory Terrace

Rugby union career
- Position: scrum-half
International career
| Years | Team | Apps | (Points) |
| 1899–1903 | Australia | 3 | (0) |

Austin Sarsfield Ireland "Grally" Gralton (9 February 1871 – 1 July 1919) was a rugby union player who represented Australia.

Gralton, a scrum-half, was born in Kempsey, New South Wales and claimed three international rugby caps for Australia. His debut game was against Great Britain at Sydney, on 24 June 1899, the inaugural rugby Test match played by an Australian national representative side.

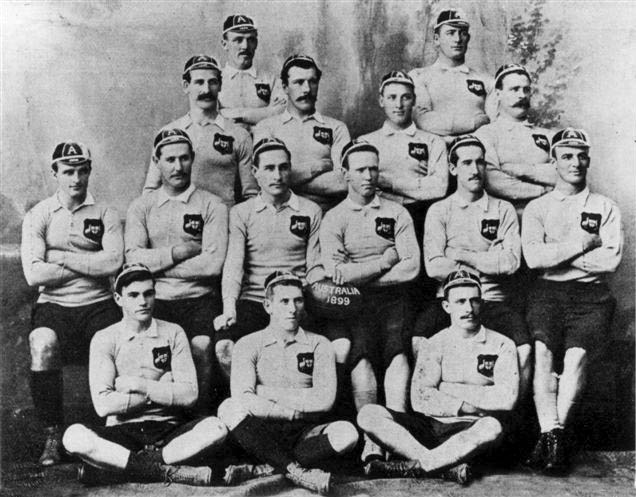
Gralton appeared in the inaugural Australian rugby union team, 1899

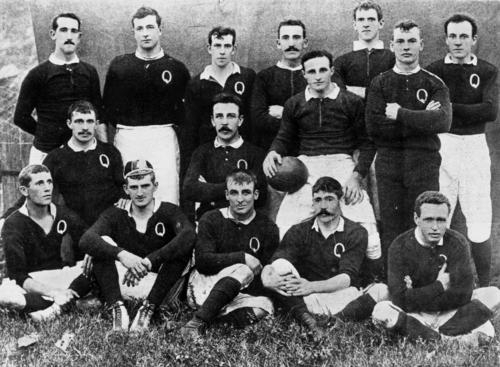
Gralton shown middle 1st from left, after the 1 July Queensland match against the 1899 British Lions.

== Published references ==
- Collection (1995) Gordon Bray presents The Spirit of Rugby, HarperCollins Publishers Sydney
- Howell, Max (2005) Born to Lead - Wallaby Test Captains, Celebrity Books, Auckland NZ
