= Ernest Currie =

Australian rugby union player

- Born: Ernest William Currie; 9 April 1873 Dunedin, Otago, New Zealand
- Died: 23 October 1932 (aged 59) Randwick, New South Wales, Australia

Rugby union career
- Position: scrum-half
International career
| Years | Team | Apps | (Points) |
| 1899 | Australia | 1 | (0) |

Ernest William Currie (9 April 1873 – 23 October 1932) was a New Zealand-born rugby union international for Australia and a first-class cricketer.

== Cricket career ==
Currie, who was born at Dunedin, represented Otago in six first-class cricket matches during the 1894–95 and 1893–94 New Zealand cricket seasons, as a wicket-keeper. He was regarded as one of New Zealand's best wicket-keepers of his time, "a lightning hand behind the sticks".

After moving to Australia, he appeared in one further first-class match for Queensland, against New South Wales at the Sydney Cricket Ground in 1899.

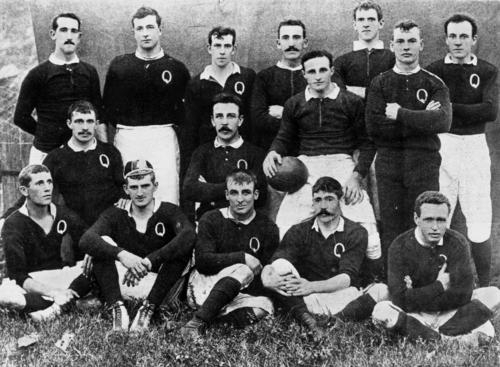
Currie shown front row 2nd from right, after the 1 July Queensland match against the 1899 British Lions.

== Rugby union career ==
Currie, a scrum-half, claimed one international rugby cap for Australia. He played against Great Britain, at Brisbane, on 22 July 1899, the second ever Test match played by an Australian national side. His performance in that match was noted as "excellent" by the press.

== Personal life ==
Currie worked as a clerk. He and his wife Annie had a son and two daughters. He died at Randwick in 1932 aged 59.
