= George Bouffler =

- Born: Robert George Bouffler; 31 January 1874
- Died: c. 1956

Rugby union career
- Position: hooker
International career
Years	Team	Apps	(Points)
1899	Australia	1	(0)

Robert George Bouffler (31 January 1874 - c. 1956) was a rugby union player who represented Australia.

Bouffler, a hooker, claimed one international rugby cap for Australia, playing against Great Britain, at Sydney, on 5 August 1899.
