= Esmond Martelli =

British Isles international rugby union player

- Born: Arthur Esmonde Martelli Dublin, Ireland
- Died: Paddington, England

Rugby union career
- Position: Fullback
Amateur team(s)
Years	Team	Apps	(Points)
- Dublin University Football Club
International career
Years	Team	Apps	(Points)
1899	British Isles	1	(0)

Arthur Esmonde Martelli (16 June 1878 – 1926) was an Irish international rugby union fullback back who played club rugby for Dublin University. Martelli played international rugby for the British Isles team on its 1899 tour of Australia. He was described by British Isles tour manager, Matthew Mullineux, as having 'an excellent drop, punt and place kick'.

== Rugby career ==
Martelli was one of several players who undertook the 1899 British Isles tour, of which little is known. He is classed as playing for Dublin University, though the university rugby club does not have him recorded as being on the role of Trinity players. There is some evidence that Martelli was not actually a Trinity player as recorded in most books and may have actually played for Dublin Wanderers.

Martelli did play 2nd XI cricket for DUCC on several occasions.

Despite the confusion of his club background, he is known to have toured with the British Isles and played in 12 of the 21 arranged matches. Martelli was the first choice fullback for the opening games of the tour, and in the second invitational game, against New South Wales, he scored all the British points, with a dropped goal in a narrow 4–3 victory.

After missing the game against Metropolitan, Martelli was chosen to be the fullback for the First Test against Australia. The game ended in a 13–3 victory for the Australians, and Martelli was replaced for the final three Tests by Charles Thompson. Although Martelli played in no further test matches, he still played in another nine games in the tour, scoring a penalty goal in the encounter with New England at Armidale.

Despite never playing for the Ireland national team, Martelli continued his involvement with Irish rugby and refereed the Scotland vs. Wales match in the 1903 Home Nations Championship.

== Bibliography ==
- Griffiths, John (1990). British Lions. Swindon: Crowood Press. ISBN 1-85223-541-1.
