= Peter Ward (rugby union) =

Australia international rugby union player

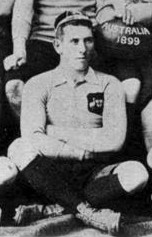
- Born: Peter M. Ward; 5 November 1876 Invercargill, New Zealand
- Died: 9 February 1943 (aged 66)

Rugby union career
- Position: Fly-half
Amateur team(s)
Years	Team	Apps	(Points)
1897–98, 1903	Britannia		
1899	Marrackville (Sydney)		
1904	Grafton		
1905	Napier City		
1906	Waimate		
1908	Awarua		
Provincial / State sides
Years	Team	Apps	(Points)
1897–98, 1903	Southland	13	
1899	New South Wales	2	
1904	Auckland	1	
1905	Hawke's Bay	1	
1906	Taranaki		
1908	Wanganui	1	
International career
Years	Team	Apps	(Points)
1899	Australia	4	(0)

Peter M. Ward (5 November 1876 – 9 February 1943) was a New Zealand-born rugby union player who represented Australia.

A fly-half, he was born in Invercargill, Southland.

Ward was described as "astute and a skillful inside back".

A member of the Britannia club Ward initially played for the Southland province between 1897 and 1898. He then moved to Sydney, Australia in 1899 and joined the Marrackville club. He was selected for New South Wales to play in their two matches against the touring Great Britain side. After this he claimed a total of four international rugby caps for the Australia. His Test debut was against Great Britain, at Sydney, on 24 June 1899, the inaugural rugby Test match played by an Australian national representative side.

Due to funding constraints he was one of only six New South Wales players (Charlie Ellis, Hyram Marks, Lonnie Spragg, Bob McCowan, and Robert Challoner were the others) selected to make the trip to Brisbane four weeks later for the second Test. His performance in that match was noted as "excellent" by the press.

Ward had moved back to New Zealand by 1903, linking back with Britannia and Southland for one final year. He captained Southland to their first win against Auckland 9-6 in Invercargill. The Ranfurly Shield holders came south in 1903 boasting six All Blacks in their team including Dave Gallaher.

Ward soon after shifted to Auckland and joined the Grafton club for the 1904 season. He further played for the provinces of Hawke's Bay in 1905, Taranaki in 1906 and Wanganui in 1908 playing for the Napier City, Waimate and Awarua clubs respectively.

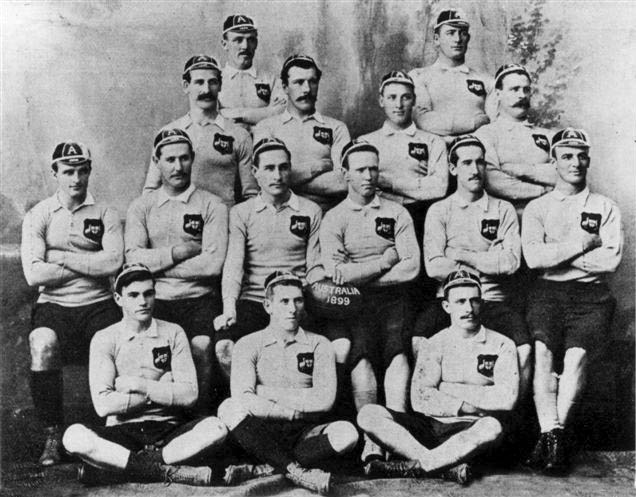
Ward (front row, centre) in the Australian rugby union team 1899
