= Charlie White (rugby union) =

Australian rugby union player (1874–1941)

- Born: Charles John Bloomfield White; 9 March 1874 Maitland, New South Wales
- Died: 15 October 1941 (aged 67) Maitland, New South Wales

Rugby union career
- Position: wing
International career
Years	Team	Apps	(Points)
1899–1904	Australia	3	(0)

Charles John Bloomfield White (9 March 1874 – 15 October 1941) was a rugby union player who represented Australia.

White, a wing, was born in Maitland, NSW and claimed three international rugby caps for Australia. In 1899 he was playing for Sydney's Wallaroo FC when he made his Test debut against the British Lions at Sydney on 24 June 1899, the inaugural rugby Test match played by an Australian national representative side (now Wallabies).

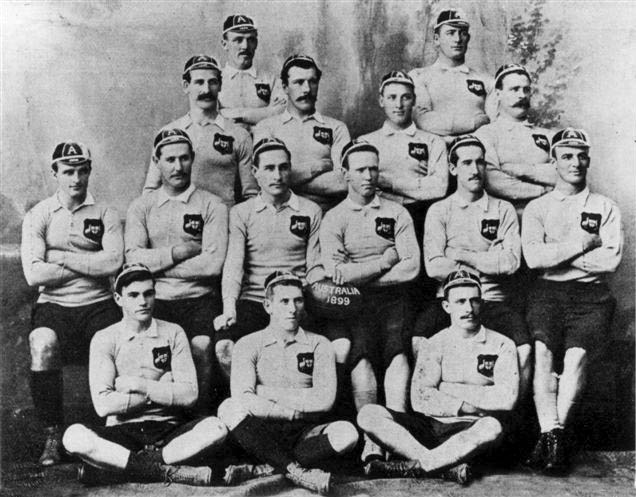
White appeared in the inaugural Australian rugby union team, 1899

== Published references ==
- Collection (1995) Gordon Bray presents The Spirit of Rugby, Harper Collins Publishers Sydney
- Howell, Max (2005) Born to Lead - Wallaby Test Captains, Celebrity Books, Auckland NZ
