= Dooee Tanner =

Australia international rugby union player

William Tanner
- Born: William Henry Tanner; 2 March 1870 Paddington, London, England
- Died: 29 December 1938 (aged 68)

Rugby union career
- Position(s): prop, hooker
International career
Years	Team	Apps	(Points)
1899	Australia	2	(0)

William Henry "Dooee" Tanner (2 March 1870 – 29 December 1938) was a rugby union player who represented Australia.

Tanner, a prop and hooker, was born in England and moved to Queensland as a child. He claimed two international rugby caps for Australia. His Test debut was against Great Britain at Sydney on 24 June 1899, the inaugural rugby Test match played by an Australian national representative side.

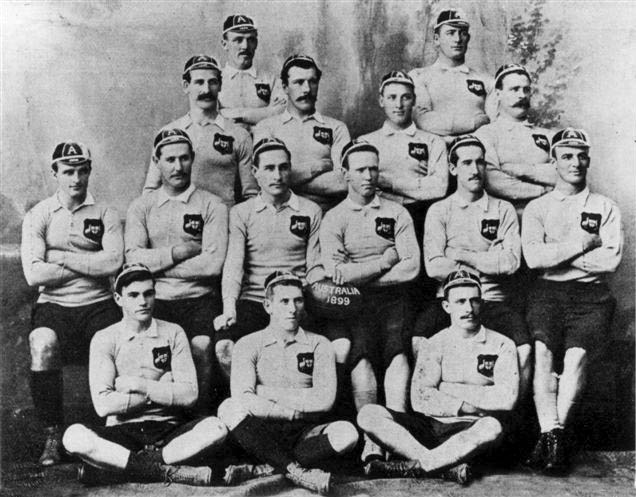
Tanner shown middle row far right in the inaugural Australian rugby union team, 1899

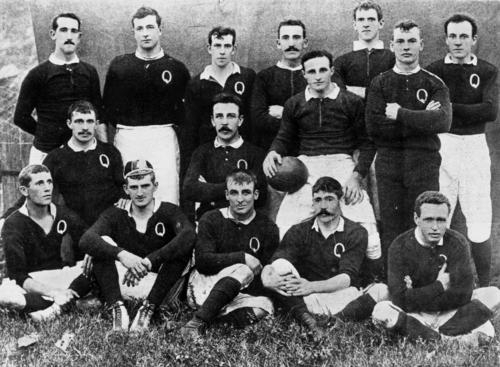
Tanner shown front row centre, after the 1 July Queensland match against the 1899 British Lions.

== Published references ==
- Collection (1995) Gordon Bray presents The Spirit of Rugby, Harper Collins Publishers Sydney
- Howell, Max (2005) Born to Lead - Wallaby Test Captains, Celebrity Books, Auckland NZ
