= James Carson (rugby union) =

Australia international rugby union player

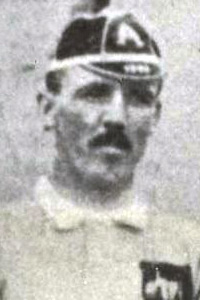
- Born: John James Carson; 9 March 1870 New Zealand
- Died: 17 August 1903 (aged 33) Dunedin
- Occupation: Fireman

Rugby union career
Amateur team(s)
Years	Team	Apps	(Points)
- Pirates (Sydney)
Provincial / State sides
Years	Team	Apps	(Points)
1893–99	New South Wales	22	
International career
Years	Team	Apps	(Points)
1899	Australia	1	(0)

John James Carson (9 March 1870 - 17 August 1903) was a rugby union player who represented Australia.

== Biography ==
Carson, a prop, was born in Grahamstown, New Zealand and claimed one international rugby cap for Australia. His sole game was against Great Britain, at Sydney, on 24 June 1899, the inaugural rugby Test match played by an Australian national representative side. Zavos describes Carson as a "formidable front-rower" and quotes a contemporary commentator "the best all-round forward in Australia....in the pack, in the loose and on the lineout, he is equally good." Zavos cites the highest praises as being an acknowledgement by "New Zealanders" that he was as good as any forward in that country.

Carson died from tuberculosis in 1903.

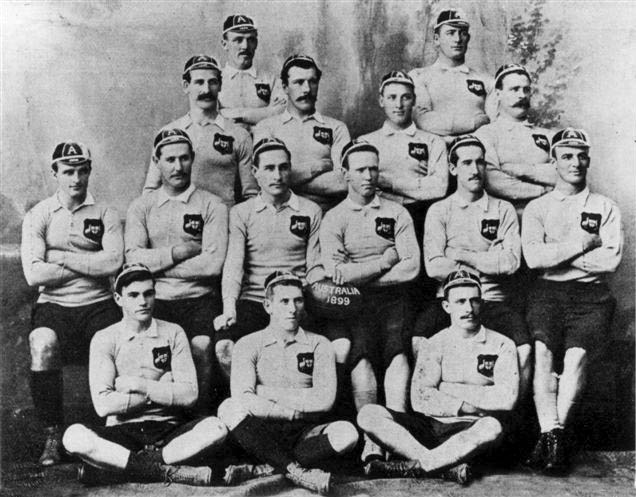
Carson appeared in the inaugural Australian rugby union team, 1899

== Sources ==
- Collection (1995) Gordon Bray presents The Spirit of Rugby, Harper Collins Publishers Sydney
- Howell, Max (2005) Born to Lead - Wallaby Test Captains, Celebrity Books, Auckland NZ
