= Norm Street =

Australia international rugby union player (1876–1963)

- Born: Norman Ogilvie Street; 10 July 1876 Bathurst, NSW
- Died: 10 June 1963 (aged 86) Pymble, NSW

Rugby union career
- Position: flanker
International career
Years	Team	Apps	(Points)
1899	Australia	1	(0)

Norman Ogilvie Street (10 July 1876 – 10 June 1963) was a rugby union player who represented Australia.

Street, a flanker, was born in Bathurst, NSW and claimed one international rugby cap for Australia. His debut game was against Great Britain, at Brisbane, on 22 July 1899.
