= Walter Davis (rugby union) =

- Born: Walter Davis

Rugby union career
- Position(s): lock, prop
International career
Years	Team	Apps	(Points)
1899	Australia	3	(0)

Walter Davis was a rugby union player who represented Australia.

Davis, a prop and lock, claimed a three international rugby caps for Australia. His debut game was against Great Britain at Sydney on 24 June 1899, the inaugural rugby Test match played by an Australian national representative side.

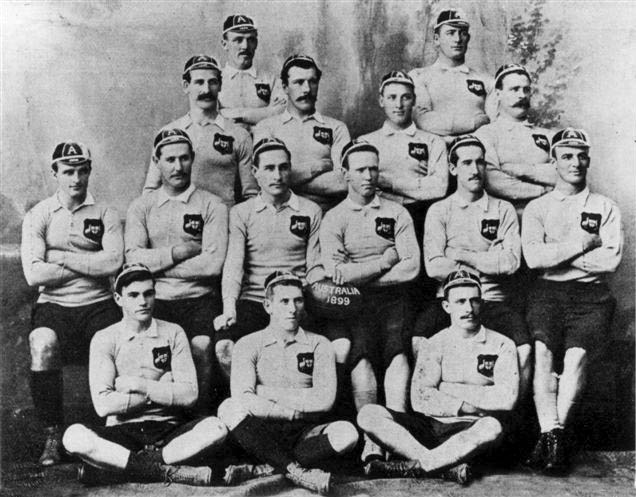
Davis appeared in the inaugural Australian rugby union team, 1899

== Published references ==
- Collection (1995) Gordon Bray presents The Spirit of Rugby, HarperCollins Publishers Sydney
- Howell, Max (2005) Born to Lead - Wallaby Test Captains, Celebrity Books, Auckland NZ
