= Iggy O'Donnell =

- Born: Ignatius Charles O'Donnell; 27 May 1876 Hillston, NSW
- Died: c. 1946
- School: Saint Ignatius' College, Riverview
- Occupation: Rugby Union player

Rugby union career
- Position: fly-half
International career
Years	Team	Apps	(Points)
1899	Australia	2	(0)

Ignatius Charles "Iggy" O'Donnell (27 May 1876 – c. 1946) was a rugby union player who represented Australia.

== Biography ==
Iggy O'Donnell, a fly-half, was born in Hillston, New South Wales and claimed a total of 2 international rugby caps for Australia. His debut game was against Great Britain, at Sydney, on 5 August 1899. His brother John ("Jack") O'Donnell, also played for Australia as a forward in the final Test of Australia's first-ever series with the Lions. Like his brother Jack, Iggy captained NSW against Queensland in their Sydney matches in both the 1900 and 1901 seasons and took on the role as the side's goal kicker. Both brothers were old boys of Saint Ignatius' College, Riverview, members of the Sydney's famous Wallaroos Rugby Club and later North Sydney (later re-branded as Northern Suburbs).

Jack was a rookie in his early twenties and had never appeared in a state match when he packed down against the tourists. Jack later made 25 appearances for New South Wales, including three against David Bedell-Sivright's British/Irish side in 1904. He captained both Norths and NSW, but never again appeared in a Test. Jack O'Donnell died in 1956, aged 79.
