= William Tasker =

Australian rugby union player

- Born: William George Tasker; 15 October 1891 Condobolin, New South Wales
- Died: 9 August 1918 (aged 26) Harbonnieres, France
- School: Newington College

Rugby union career
- Position: fly-half
- Current team: deceased
Senior career
Years	Team	Apps	(Points)
1912-1915	Newtown RUFC		
International career
Years	Team	Apps	(Points)
1913-1914	Australia	6	(0)
- Military career
- Burial place: Villers-Bretonneux Military Cemetery
- Allegiance: Australia
- Branch: Australian Army
- Service years: 1916 – 1918
- Rank: Lieutenant
- Nickname: Twit
- Units: 13th Battalion; 116th Howitzer Battery
- Conflicts: World War I; Gallipoli campaign (WIA); Landing at Anzac Cove; Western Front; Hundred Days Offensive; Battle of Amiens (DOW)

William George "Twit" Tasker (15 October 1891 – 9 August 1918) was an Australian World War I soldier who had been a national representative rugby union player making six Test appearances for the Wallabies.

== Early life ==
The third son of David Henry Tasker (died 1920), and Helene Tasker (died 1912), William George Tasker was born in Condobolin, New South Wales on 15 October 1891.

Tasker attended Newington College from (1906–1911). He captained the Newington First XV in 1911 and was selected in and captained the GPS Schools representative 1st XV in 1911. He stayed in Sydney after completing his schooling becoming a bank clerk whilst pursuing a rugby career.

== Rugby career ==
He debuted for the Newtown Rugby Club in Sydney in 1912 and that same year at age 20 he captained the club's first-grade side.

He was selected in the Australia national rugby union squad which toured North America in 1912; although he did not play a Test. The squad was overwhelmed with hospitality and lacking strong management they reveled in the social life and undergraduate antics of the college fraternity houses in which they were billeted. In what must be the worst record of any Australian touring team, the squad lost all of their Canadian matches among five defeats.

Tasker was the first-ever Wallaby to be sent from the field. An incident occurred on the 1912 tour of the United States when Tasker's rough play upset an American referee.

Tasker made his Test debut at Athletic Park (Wellington) on the 1913 tour of New Zealand and played in all three Tests of that tour. The following year he made three further Test appearances when the All Blacks toured Australia in a return series.

== War service ==
Tasker enlisted in the AIF in January 1915, a Gunner in the 12th Field Artillery Brigade, 13th Battalion (Australia). He took part in the Landing at Anzac Cove, landing late on 25 April 1915. From May to August, the 13th battalion was heavily involved in establishing and defending the ANZAC front lines.

Tasker was severely wounded at Quinn's Post at Gallipoli with shell fragment damage to his legs and ankle. He was invalided back to Australia. A rugby colleague also at Gallipoli, H.A Mitchell of the Manly Club wrote home of Tasker's injuries "A bomb loaded up Tasker's leg and ankle up with about 17 pieces of shot. It will be sometime before he can do any of that sidestepping he used to do".

In 1916 he re-enlisted with the 116th Howitzer Battery and he again embarked from Sydney on board HMAT A60 Aeneas on 30 September. He saw further action on the Western Front and was twice wounded.

== Death ==
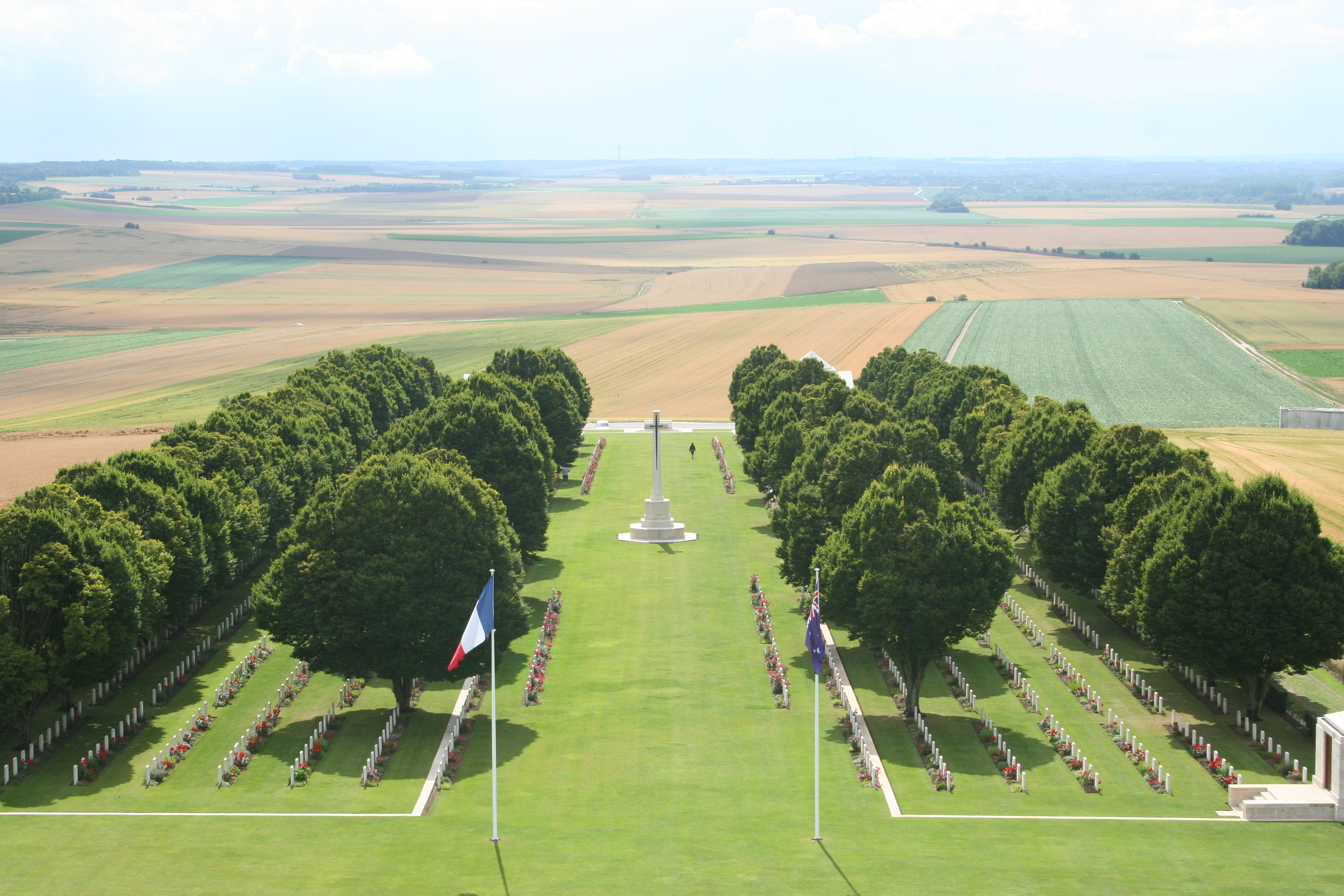
Cemetery in Villers-Bretonneux where lies William Tasker & 770 other Australian fallen

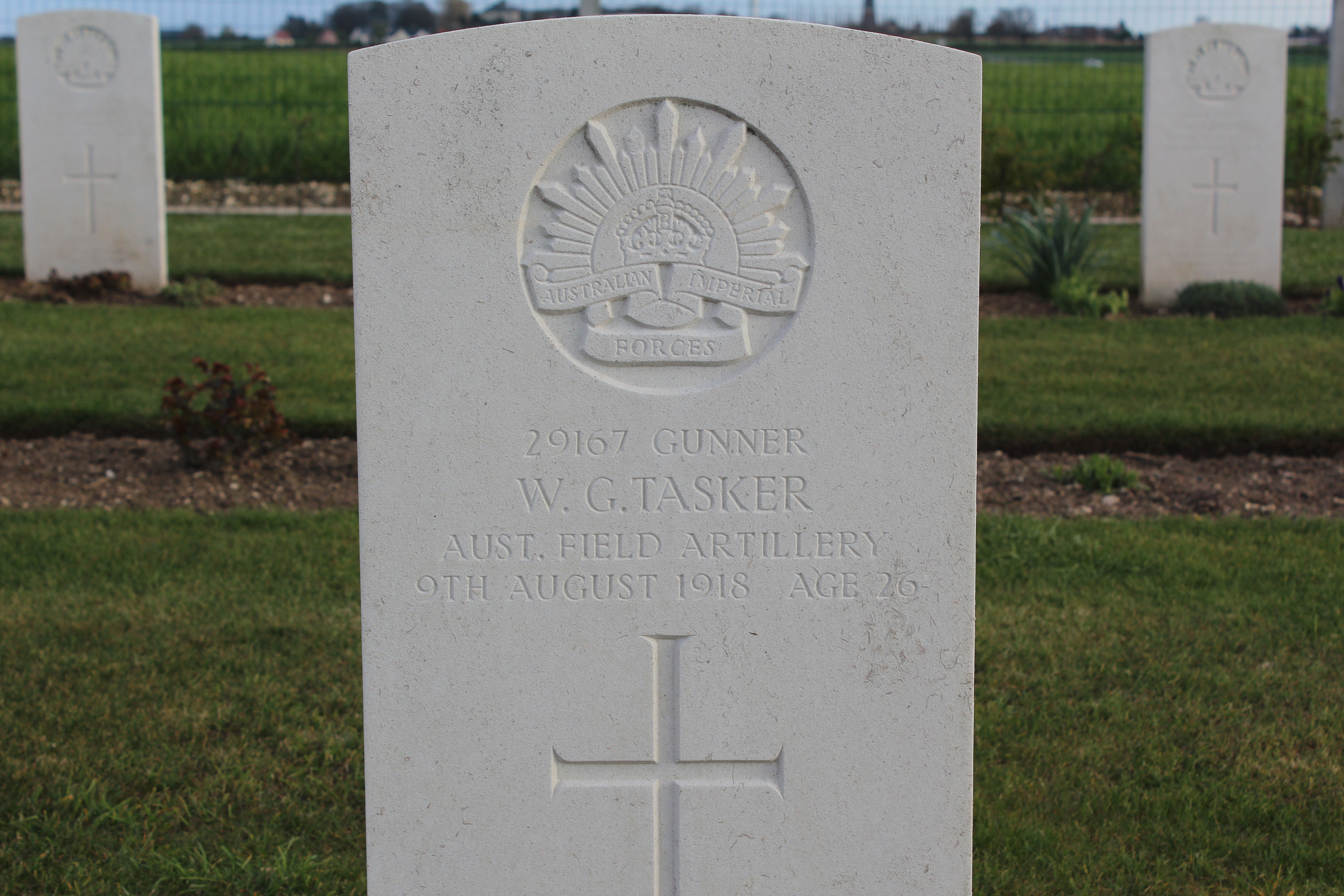
Tasker's grave at Villers-Bretonneux

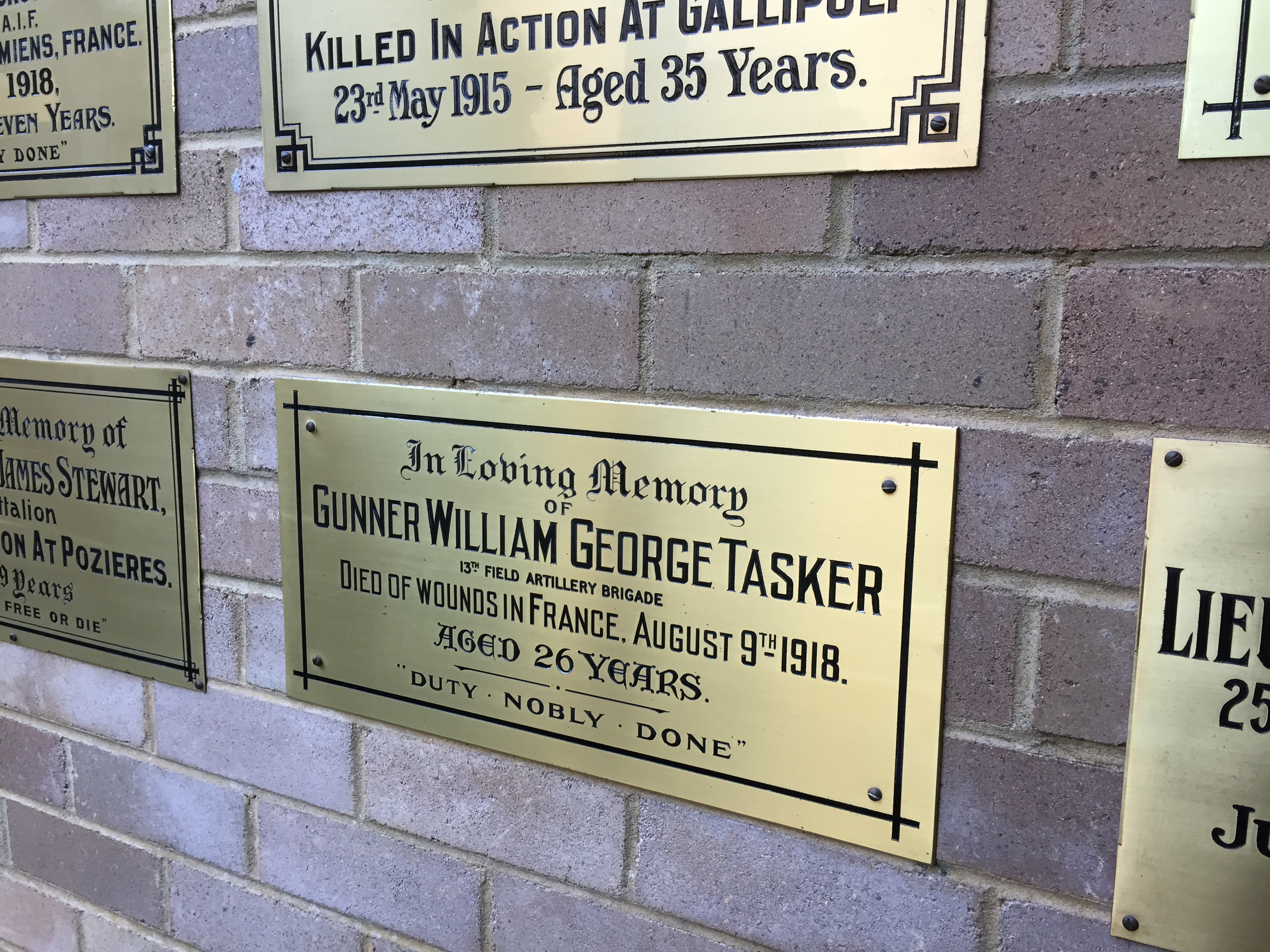
Tasker's memorial plaque at Newington College

On 9 August 1918, Tasker was working with his artillery gun sights at Harbonnieres on the second day of the Battle of Amiens when a shell landed near the gun, mortally wounding him in the groin with shrapnel. He died later that day at the age of 26.

He is buried at the Villers-Bretonneux Military Cemetery.

The sporting journal The Referee reported:

Soldier-footballer W.G. Tasker has fallen in France. Here was a young representative Australian Rugby Union five-eighth, who played against New Zealand, America and Queensland, and won honors for his school, Newington College. When the bugle-call to arms was sounded in 1914 he put aside the jersey for the khaki, the football for the rifle and the bayonet.
To Gallipoli he went, and fought grimly by the side of gallant comrades of the football field, some to fall before his eyes: unbeaten Harold George and fearless Fred Thompson. He spoke of the deeds of these true men as a little brother talks of big brothers who do things that thrill.
Twit Tasker came back [to Sydney] wounded badly, but in time recovered sufficiently to induce the keen-eyed military masters to pass him again for active service. In France another of the 1914 Blues of NSW who had been a hero with him at Gallipoli, Captain C. Wallach, M.C., recently fell, and now Twit Tasker, the youngest of the lot, has gone down with the colors flying.
His spirit is that which will permeate the men and women destined to make of Australia the salt of the earth in days to come, when few here now will be here to see the greatness come to the land and its people – a greatness born of the turmoil of the war.

— The Referee, 28 August 1918.

In the same issue, the sporting journalist, "The Rambler", made these comments:

Rugby Union footballers continue to, pay the price of war. Cpl. W.G. Tasker, the latest to give his life, did so after accomplishing something that few soldiers have equalled. The brilliant International five-eighth enlisted at the outbreak of the war and was seriously wounded at Gallipoli. Invalided home and discharged, he was restless to return, and after being twice rejected managed to be accepted for the artillery. Even then he had difficulty in getting away, and narrowly missed being returned from Capetown, where he was in hospital for some time. A similar experience befell him in London, but he was determined, and eventually got to France. About six weeks ago news arrived that he had been seriously wounded, but as the message received last Saturday states, he was killed in action, he must have successfully made another attempt to get into the firing line. It is one of the many remarkable instances of pertinacity the war has furnished.
A very fine footballer, he captained Newington College in 1910-11, the Black and White winning the premiership in the latter year, when he also led the Combined Schools in their successful battle against University. He figured as five-eighth for Newtown in the three following seasons, and was captain in 1914. In each of these years he represented the State, and in 1912 visited America with the Australian Combination. A year later he was one of the team that toured New Zealand. Of those who played in the U.S.A., C.[sic] Jones, Harold George, G. Pugh and now Twit Tasker have given their lives. W.T. Watson, T.J. Richards, A. Walker, J. Clarken, D.B. Carroll, E.J. Fahey, R. Adamson, M. Fraser are on active service. A.R. Dunbar has enlisted, and J. Wylie was rejected – a great record for a team.

— The Referee, 28 August 1918.

== Honours and awards ==

- British War Medal
- Victory Medal

== See also ==
- List of international rugby union players killed in action during the First World War
