= 1913 Australia rugby union tour of New Zealand =

Australia rugby union tour of New Zealand
- Coach: M.C. Morgan
- Tour captain: Larry Dwyer
Summary
P	W	D	L
Total
9	3	0	6
Test match
3	1	0	2
Opponent
P	W	D	L
New Zealand
3	1	0	2

The 1913 Australia rugby union tour of New Zealand was a collection of friendly rugby union games undertaken by the Australia national rugby union team against various invitational teams from New Zealand and also against the New Zealand national team.

The team played in the light-blue jersey of NSW Waratahs with the state emblem and the word "Australia" on the chest. Australia played 8 matches, with only 3 victories and 5 defeats.

== Touring party ==
=== Management ===
- Manager: M.C. Morgan
- Captain: Larry Dwyer
- Vice-captain: Ted Fahey

=== Full backs ===
- R. Simpson (New South Wales)

=== Three quarters ===
- D. Suttor (New South Wales)
- Larry Dwyer (New South Wales)
- E. Carr (New South Wales)
- L. Wogan (New South Wales)
- L. Meibush (Queensland)
- M.J. McMahon (Queensland)
- Fred Wood (New South Wales)
- J. Flynn (Queensland)
- H.A. Jones (New South Wales)

=== Half backs ===
- William Tasker (New South Wales)

=== Forwards ===
- Harold George (New South Wales)
- C. O'Donnell (New South Wales)
- Bill Watson (New South Wales)
- Ted Fahey (New South Wales)
- Clarrie Wallach (New South Wales)
- D.B. Hughes (New South Wales)
- F. Thompson (New South Wales)
- R. Roberts (New South Wales)
- R.B. Hill (New South Wales)
- D. Williams (Queensland)
- A. Horadan (Queensland)
- P. Murphy (Queensland)
- W. Cody (New South Wales)
- IL Jones (New South Wales)

== Match summary ==
Complete list of matches played by the Wallabies in New Zealand:

Test matches

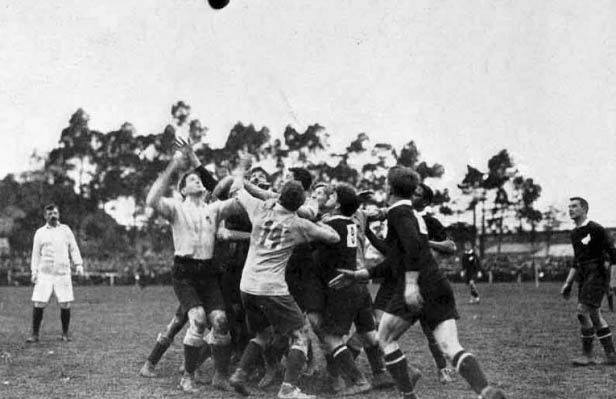
Scene of one of the two tests played v. New Zealand

#	Date	Rival	City	Venue	Score
1	27 Aug	Auckland RU	Auckland	Alexandra Park	13–15
2	30 Aug	Taranaki RU	New Plymouth		11–9
3	3 Sep	Wanganui RFU	Wanganui		6–11
4	6 Sep	New Zealand	Wellington	Athletic Park	5–30
5	10 Sep	Southland RU	Invercargill		8–13
6	13 Sep	New Zealand	Dunedin	Carisbrook Stadium	13–25
7	17 Sep	South Canterbury RU	Timaru		3–16
8	20 Sep	New Zealand	Christchurch	Lancaster Park	16–5
9	24 Sep	Marlborough RU	Blenheim		30–3

Balance
Pl	W	D	L	Ps	Pc
9	3	0	5	105	127

== Match details ==
=== Auckland RU ===
27 August

Auckland RU	15–13	Australia
Pen: O'Leary, McGregor (2), Macky	Report	Try: McMabon (2); Pen: McMabon

Alexandra Park
Attendance: 4,000

=== New Zealand (1st Test) ===
6 September

New Zealand	30–5	Australia
Try: Gray, Lynch (3), McKenzie (2), Murray, Roberts; Con: Roberts (3)	Report	Try: Carr; Con: McMahon

Athletic Park, Wellington
Attendance: 5,000
Referee: R.L. Simpson (Wellington)

Team details

New Zealand	Australia

New Zealand: P. Williams, G. M. V. Sellars, A. J. Downing, H. J. Atkinson, J. T. Wylie, A. McDonald (capt), H. Dewar, H. V. Murray, H. M. Taylor, D. Gray, A. J. McGregor, R. J. McKenzie, R. W. Roberts, T. W. Lynch, J. E. Cuthill
Australia: H. George, C. O'Donnell, W. T. Watson, E. J. Fahey (capt), C. Wallach, E. W. Cody, P. J. Murphy, F. Thompson, F. Wood, W. G. Tasker, E. T. Carr, L. W. Wogan, H. A. Jones, D. C. Suttor, M. J. McMahon

=== New Zealand (2nd Test) ===
13 September

New Zealand	25–13	Australia
Try: Brown, Cummings, Hasell, Taylor, Wilson; Con: O'Leary (3); Drop: O'Leary	Report	Try: Jones (2), Suttor; Con: Simpson (2)

Carisbrook, Dunedin
Attendance: 15,000
Referee: A.D. Downes (Otago)

Team details

New Zealand	Australia

New Zealand: W. C. Francis, E. W. Hasell, W. Cummings, C. T. Gillespie, J. McNeece, J. Barrett, N. A. Wilson, R. Taylor, C. Brown, W. McK. Geddes, J. V. Macky, A. P. Spillane, J. A. S. Baird, J. D. Stewart, M. J. O'Leary (capt)
Australia: W. T. Watson, C. O'Donnell, A. D. Horodan, E. J. Fahey (capt), P. J. Murphy, B. D. Hughes, E. W. Cody, F. Thompson, F. Wood, W. G. Tasker, E. T. Carr, L. W. Wogan, H. A. Jones, D. C. Suttor, R. Simpson

=== New Zealand (3rd Test) ===
20 September

New Zealand	5–16	Australia
Try: Fanning; Con: O'Leary	Report	Try: Jones, Suttor (2), Thompson; Con: Hughes (2)

Lancaster Park, Christchurch
Referee: G.W. Nicholson (Auckland)

Team details

New Zealand	Australia

New Zealand: W. C. Francis, E. W. Hasell, W. Cummings, A. H. N. Fanning, J. McNeece, J. Barrett, N. A. Wilson, R. Taylor, C. Brown, J. T. Tilyard, E. A. P. Cockroft, A. P. Spillane, P. J. Burns, J. D. Stewart, M. J. O'Leary (capt)
Australia: W. T. Watson, H. George, D. Williams, C. Wallach, P. J. Murphy, B. D. Hughes, E. W. Cody, F. Thompson, F. Wood, W. G. Tasker, E. T. Carr, L. W. Wogan, H. A. Jones, D. C. Suttor, L. J. Dwyer (capt)

== Bibliography ==
Found on Papers Past website

- Auckland Star, Monday 25 August 1913, p. 6
- Evening Post, Thursday 28 August 1913, p. 4
- Auckland Star, Monday 1 September 1913, p. 8
- Evening Post, Thursday 4 September 1913, p. 4
- Colonist, Monday 8 September 2013, p. 6
- Wairarapa Daily Times, Thursday 11 September 1913, p. 6
- Auckland Star, Monday 15 September 1913, p. 8
- Evening Post, Thursday 18 September 1913, p. 4
- Evening Post, Monday 22 September 1913, p. 4
- Evening Post, Thursday 25 September 1913, p. 4
