= 1912 Australia rugby union tour of Canada and the United States =

- Coach: Otto Bohrsmann
- Tour captain: Ward Prentice
Summary
P	W	D	L
Total
16	11	0	5
Test match
1	1	0	0
Opponent
P	W	D	L
United States
1	1	0	0

The 1912 Australia rugby union tour of Canada and the United States was a collection of friendly rugby union games undertaken by the Australia national rugby union team (now "Wallabies") against various invitational teams from Canada and the U.S., and also against the US national team. The Australian team was tagged the "Kangaroo Waratahs".

== The squad's leadership ==
Dr. Otto Martin Bohrsmann (1869–1944) was tour manager. He was a Sydney physician who served as New South Wales Rugby Union treasurer for a number of years and the Newtown District Rugby Union Club. Howell attributes the team's poor performance to a lack of discipline stemming from weakly imposed tour management. Bohrsmann's name would later be given to the landmark Mona Road, Darling Point, Sydney property Otto, which he bought in 1925 and which was retained by his descendants until 2010. His sister Altona would give her name to another Sydney landmark, a Point Piper home which in 2007 set the mark as Australia's most expensive home when it sold for A$50million.

Billy Hill was the secretary of the New South Wales Rugby Union, he toured with the squad as Assistant Manager and refereed some of the matches. At this time team coaches were frowned upon, with the team captain expected to fulfill these duties.

Ward Prentice had toured with the 1908 Wallabies and had played both Tests of that tour. He had made three further Test appearances for Australia in 1910. He was a rugged on-field leader and the 1912 tour marked his swan-song in international rugby, appearing in fifteen of the sixteen matches. After World War I he had a brief first-grade rugby league career Sydney in 1920.

Tom Richards had also toured with the 1908 Wallabies and had played 1st grade rugby all over the world, making district representative sides in Queensland, New South Wales, South Africa and England. He was a leader in the forwards and a natural selection as tour vice-captain. He would later see active service with the AIF, landing on day one of the Gallipoli Campaign on 25 April 1915 and he would be awarded the Military Cross for conspicuous gallantry on the Western Front.

== Tour itinerary ==
The squad travelled by ship from Sydney to the US on the SS Moana with a number of the touring party confined to their cabins with sea-sickness for the first four days. Howell attributes the team's poor performance record to a focus placed on socialising. The squad was billeted out in college fraternity houses in California where the hospitality played havoc with team discipline. Howell quotes squad member Bob Adamson who spoke of the tour: "We were never in bed. That was the trouble. I've never had such a time in my life"

== Tour statistics ==
The tour took in 16 games with only 11 won by the Wallabies, including the sole Test of the tour played against the US All three matches played in Canada were lost by the Wallabies as well as one of the two matches against Stanford University and one of the three matches played against UC Berkeley. The team played in the light-blue jersey of New South Wales with a Waratah emblem and the word Australia on the chest.

== Touring party ==
The second match of the 1912 New South Wales v Queensland interstate series acted as a selection trial for the tour and the Blues won the match 12–3 in Sydney. The selectors chose only six Queenslanders in the squad including Tom Richards, Jimmy Flynn, Lou Meibusch, Copper Kent, Peter Cunningham and Bob Willocks. Willocks withdrew from the touring squad before departure and his place was taken by fellow Queenslander William Murphy. Flynn and Meisbusch were still aged 18 years at the start of the tour.The Australian team was tagged the "Kangaroo Waratahs" by the Los Angeles Times.

=== Management ===
Tom Richards

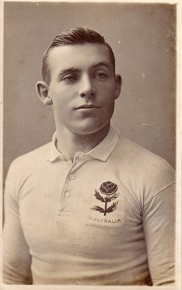
Danny Carroll

- Manager: Dr. Otto Bohrsmann
- Assistant: W.W Hill
- Captain: Ward Prentice
- Vice-Captain: Tom Richards

=== Full backs ===
- Alf Dunbar (Newtown, NSW)
- Larry Dwyer (Warratahs-Orange, Western Districts, NSW)

=== Three-quarters ===
- Bob Adamson (Sydney University, NSW)
- Daniel Carroll (St. George, NSW)
- Jimmy Flynn (Brothers, Queensland)
- Hubert Jones (Newcastle, NSW)
- Lou Meibusch (Past Grammar-Toowoomba, Queensland)

=== Half backs ===
- Ward Prentice (West Suburbs, NSW)
- William Tasker (Newtown, NSW)
- Arthur Walker (Eastern Suburbs, NSW)

=== Forwards ===
- Jimmy Clarken (Glebe, NSW)
- Peter Cunningham (Eastern Suburbs, Queensland)
- Ted Fahey (Eastern Suburbs, NSW)
- Harold George (Eastern Suburbs, NSW)
- Tom Griffen (Glebe, NSW)
- Ralph Hill (Newtown)
- Allan Kent (Past Grammar-Toowoomba, Queensland)
- William Murphy (Brothers, Queensland)
- George Pugh (Newtown, NSW)
- Tom Richards (Natives-Charters Towers, Queensland)
- William Watson (Newtown, NSW)

== Match summary ==
Complete list of matches played by the Wallabies in the Canada and the United States:

Test matches

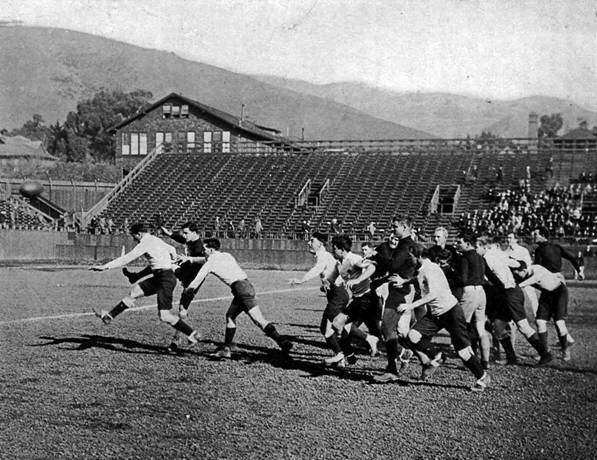
Australia v. United States (dark jersey) test, played on 16 November

#	Date	Rival	City	Venue	Score
1	5 Oct	Barbarians	San Francisco	St. Ignatius Field	29–8
2	6 Oct	Santa Clara Broncos	Santa Clara	Golden Gate Stadium	20–8
3	12 Oct	Stanford Indians	Palo Alto	Stanford Park	6–0
4	16 Oct	Stanford Indians	Palo Alto	Stanford Park	12–13
5	19 Oct	Olympic Club	San Francisco	St. Ignatius Field	20–0
6	26 Oct	California Golden Bears	Berkeley	California Field	18–0
7	27 Oct	Saint Mary's Gaels	San Francisco	St. Ignatius Field	27–0
8	30 Oct	California Golden Bears	Berkeley	California Field	5–6
9	2 Nov	California Golden Bears	Berkeley	California Field	23–3
10	5 Nov	Nevada Wolf Pack	Reno	University Ground	57–6
11	10 Nov	Santa Clara Broncos	Santa Clara	Golden Gate Stadium	19–8
12	13 Nov	USC Trojans	Los Angeles	Boyard Field	41–0
13	16 Nov	United States	Berkeley	California Field	12–8
14	20 Nov	Vancouver	Vancouver	Stanley Park	3–6
15	23 Nov	British Columbia RU	Vancouver	Stanley Park	0–15
16	27 Nov	Victoria	Victoria	Oak Bay Ground	11–13

Balance
Pl	W	D	L	Ps	Pc
16	11	0	5	303	94

== Match details ==
=== United States ===
United States	8–12	Australia
Try: Harrigan; Con: Erb; Pen: Erb	Report	Try: Carroll, Meibusch, Richards; Pen: Prentince

California Field, Berkeley
Attendance: 10,000
Referee: L.S. Reading (England)

Team details

United States	Australia

Benjamin Erb	FB	Alex Dunbar
Stirling Peart	W	Dan Carroll
Chester Allen	C	Larry Dwyer
Charlie Austin	C	Ward Prentice (c)
Ralph Noble	W	Lou Meibusch
Phillip Harrigan	FH	Bob Adamson
Laird Morris	SH	Alfred Walker
James Arrell	P	Harold W. George
Augustus Sanborn	H	Tom Griffin
Joseph McKim	P	Bill Watson
Karl Schaupp	L	George Pugh
Warren Smith	L	Ted Fahey
Deke Gard	F	Rusty Richards
William King	F	Copper Kent
Chris Momson	N8	William Murphy

=== Bibliography ===
- Howell, Max (2005) Born to Lead – Wallaby Test Captains, Celebrity Books, Auckland NZ
- The Newcastle Herald, Tuesday 2 March 1982, page 16 (re H.A. Jones)
