= William Thornton Watson =

Australia international rugby union player

William Watson
- Born: William Thornton Watson; 10 November 1887 Nelson, New Zealand
- Died: 9 September 1961 (aged 73) New York, United States

Rugby union career
- Position: prop
Amateur team(s)
| Years | Team | Apps | (Points) |
| 1911–14 | Newtown | | |
| 1919 | AIF | | |
| 1920 | Glebe-Balmain | | |
Provincial / State sides
| Years | Team | Apps | (Points) |
| 1912–20 | NSW | 22 | |
International career
| Years | Team | Apps | (Points) |
| 1912–2> | Wallabies | 8 | (0) |

William Thornton Watson, DSO, MC and bar, DCM (10 November 1887 – 9 September 1961) was a New Zealander who served as an officer in the Australian Imperial Force in both World Wars. Prior to and after the First World War he had a distinguished rugby union career, representing Australia in eight Test matches and captaining the national side on three occasions. During the New Guinea Campaign in the Second World War he was the Commanding Officer of the Papuan Infantry Battalion. Following the war, he served as Australia's Vice – Consul to New York.

== Early life and rugby career ==
Born in Nelson, New Zealand to Australian parents, Watson's father Robert was a blacksmith who had been born in Tasmania. At age 24 William relocated to Sydney and joined the inner-city Newtown Rugby Union Club, playing at prop. In 1912 he made his representative debut for New South Wales and that same year was selected for the 1912 Australia rugby union tour of Canada and the United States. The tour was a disappointment with the squad billeted out in college fraternity houses where the hospitality played havoc with team discipline and as result the team lost against two California University sides and three Canadian provincial sides. Watson played in the sole Test match of the tour as well as ten other tour matches of the total possible sixteen. He made appearances for New South Wales in 1913 against the visiting New Zealand Maori and he toured New Zealand with the 1913 Wallabies captained by Larry Dwyer, appearing in a total of eight of the nine matches played including all three Tests packing the scrum in a consistent front-row combination with Harold George and David Williams.

When the All Blacks toured to Sydney in 1914 Watson was picked to play against them for New South Wales, as a Wallaby in the first Test in at the Sydney Cricket Ground and in a Metropolitan Sydney side in a mid-week game. An injury prevented his selection in further representative appearances against them. World War I which broke out during the tour, cut short Watson's rugby career as it did for so many other promising players yet would provide ample opportunity for grave displays of valour and courage.

== First World War ==
Watson enlisted early in the war joining the Australian Naval and Military Expeditionary Force in August 1914 and seeing early action in operations seizing German wireless stations in German New Guinea at New Britain and New Ireland. After his discharge, back in Sydney Watson enlisted as a Gunner in the 1st Divisional Artillery in March 1915. His unit embarked from Sydney on board HMAT A35 Berrima in June 1915. A letter home from his Wallaby team-mate Clarrie Wallach says that Watson saw action at Gallipoli. He landed there in August and joined the 1st Field Artillery Brigade. Evacuated from Gallipoli via Egypt his unit was transferred to the Western Front in March 1916 and soon promoted to Sergeant. He was commissioned as a 2nd Lieutenant in September 1917.

In action on the Western Front he was in November 1917 awarded the Distinguished Conduct Medal for "gallantry and coolness in going to the assistance of wounded men under heavy fire" and shortly thereafter was promoted to full lieutenant. In May 1919 he was awarded the Military Cross for gallantry as forward Observation Officer at Faucoucourt on 27 August 1918 – "in one case he worked his way forward several hundred yards in front of [the] outposts, directing the fire of three batteries, which gave great assistance to the infantry by barraging machine gun nests and strong posts" Late in the war he would earn a bar to his MC for conspicuous gallantry displayed in heavy bombardment near Bellicourt on 2–3 October 1918 when although badly gassed, he tried to save the life of a wounded officer and stayed in command of his battery until withdrawn from the line.

At war's end and during the long process of disembarking 250,000 Australian AIF troops from Europe, he was selected as captain of the AIF Rugby XV. The team represented the Australian Forces in the King's Cup rugby competition among the nations represented in the allied armies with teams representing the British, Canadian, New Zealand and South African armies as well as the RAF. The AIF XV played 16 matches winning 12 and featured a number of Wallaby representatives including Dan Carroll, Bill Cody and Dudley Suttor. After the competition the AIF XV played a number of games in South Africa and played eight games in Australia against national, New South Wales, Queensland and other regional sides. Watson played in five of the eight games, all as captain and Howell credits the tour with reviving rugby union in eastern Australia at a time when the game was in a weakened state and greatly threatened by the momentum built up by rugby league's continuance of competition throughout the war.

== Interbellum ==
Back in Australia after the war Watson took up first grade rugby again and at aged 32 joined the new venture Glebe-Balmain club, which had merged those two prior clubs as a result of the player losses each had suffered in the War. In 1920 he was selected as captain of the New South Wales state team and led them in three matches against a touring All Blacks side. With no Queensland Rugby Union administration or competition in place from 1919 to 1929, the New South Wales Waratahs were the top Australian representative rugby union side of the period and a number of their fixtures of 1920s played against full international opposition were decreed by the Australian Rugby Union in 1986 as official Test matches. Though he was not aware of it at the time, Watson's three appearances as captain of New South Wales were Test match captaincy fixtures. All told Watson played 46 matches for Newtown, 13 for Glebe-Balmain and 22 matches for New South Wales. He played 24 matches for Australia including the three NSW Tests of 1920 plus five other pre-war Tests.

From 1920 to 25 and then from 1932 to 39 he lived in Papua New Guinea working in copra production and gold-mining. Fitzsimons quotes from the Johnston reference: "For years [Watson] was one of the best known soldiers of fortune in New Guinea. He recruited native labour (in a period he still refers to as his "blackbirding days"); traded around the island in crazy schooners; tried cattle ranching; worked as trader, beachcomber, plantation manager and then as a gold prospector in the then practically unknown Owen Stanley Ranges. Several times he struck it rich, and always the money seemed to run away". In Sydney in 1929 he married American-born Cora May Callear. They would relocate to Columbiana, Ohio in 1935 and raise a son and a daughter.

== Second World War and later life ==
At the commencement of Second World War, Watson returned to Australia and served in the 2nd Australian Garrison Battalion. In June 1940 his pre-war New Guinea experience (and his ability to speak local New Guinea dialect) was put to use when he was posted to the Papuan Infantry Battalion, a force of native soldiers and Australian officers and NCOs. He took command of the unit in 1942. Upon Japan's invasion of New Guinea on 21 July 1942 and the commencement of the Kokoda Track campaign, the PIB were the first Australian Army unit to make contact with the Japanese. Together with the 39th Battalion the PIB made up Maroubra Force which engaged the Japanese in the first unsuccessful defence of the Kokoda airstrip on 28 July 1942. Upon the death in action of the battalion commander Lieutenant-Colonel William T. Owen, Watson took temporary command and the led a fighting retreat back towards the village of Deniki, a mile or so back along the Kokoda Track towards Isurava. For his bravery and leadership during the withdrawal, Watson was awarded the Distinguished Service Order. He was promoted to major on 1 September 1942 and in that rank was the commanding officer of the PIB through till April 1944.

Watson returned to the US after the war. From 1945 to 1952 he served as Australia's vice-consul in New York. He died in the Veterans Administration Hospital in Brooklyn, New York in 1961.

== Honours and awards ==

- Distinguished Service Order
- Military Cross (with bar)
- Distinguished Conduct Medal
- 1914–15 Star
- British War Medal
- Victory Medal
- 1939/45 Star
- Pacific Star
- War Medal
- Australia Service Medal 1939–1945

| Preceded by Jimmy Flynn | Australian national rugby union captain 1920 | Succeeded by Wakka Walker |
