= Ralph Hill =

Ralph Hill may refer to:

- Ralph Hill (runner) (1908–1994), American runner
- Ralph Hill (politician) (1827–1899), United States representative from Indiana
- Ralph Hill (American football) (born 1949), NFL football player
- Ralph Hill (music critic) (1900–1950), British music critic
- Ralph Hill (rugby union), Australian international rugby union player
- Ralph Nading Hill (1917–1987), Vermont writer and preservationist

== See also ==
- Ralph Hills (1902–1977), American shot putter
