= Peter Cunningham (rugby union) =

Australia international rugby union player (1887–1972)

- Born: 4 March 1887 Brisbane, Australia
- Died: 9 July 1972 (aged 85)

Rugby union career
- Position: Wing–forward
Provincial / State sides
Years	Team	Apps	(Points)
1911–13	Queensland		
International career
Years	Team	Apps	(Points)
1912	Australia		

Peter Cunningham (4 March 1887 – 9 July 1972) was an Australian international rugby union player.

Born in Brisbane, Cunningham was a tall, slender and speedy wing–forward. He was one of three brothers to play first grade in Brisbane, which included Queensland representative John Cunningham. Initially attached to Brisbane club Valleys, Cunningham later played his first grade for Eastern Districts.

Cunningham made his representative debut for Queensland in 1911 and the following year made the national team for a tour of North America. His opportunities on tour were limited and he was largely a back up for Tom Richards, restricting him to only three uncapped appearances. He attempted to enlist in World War I, but was turned down due to an injury he had sustained during the tour.

== See also ==
- List of Australia national rugby union players
