= Harold George =

Harold George may refer to:

- Harold Huston George (1892–1942), USAAF Brigadier General
- Harold L. George (1893–1986), USAAF Lieutenant General, Hughes Aircraft executive
- Harold Wesley George (1887–1915), Australian rugby union player
