= Fred Thompson (rugby union) =

Australian rugby union player

- Born: Frederick Herbert Thompson circa 1890 Maroubra, New South Wales
- Died: 29 May 1915 (aged 24–25) Gallipoli, Ottoman Turkey

Rugby union career
- Position: number eight
Amateur team(s)
Years	Team	Apps	(Points)
- Eastern Suburbs
International career
Years	Team	Apps	(Points)
1913–14	Wallabies	6	(3)

Frederick Herbert Thompson (1890–1915) was an Australian national representative rugby union player and soldier who fell in the Great War.

Born in Maroubra, New South Wales to Henry and Dorothy Thompson, Fred Thompson played at number eight with the Eastern Suburbs RUFC. His international debut was made during the Wallabies 1913 tour of New Zealand captained by Larry Dwyer. Thompson played in all three Tests of the tour. In 1914 the All Blacks came to Australia and again Thompson played in all three Tests, twice as number 8 and once at flanker. His rugby career ended with the start of World War I with a tally of six international rugby caps for Australia.

He enlisted in Sydney in the AIF in January 1915 six months after war was declared, citing his occupation as carpenter. He embarked as a Private with the 13th Battalion (3rd reinforcement) from Sydney on 11 February 1915 on board HMAT A49 Seang Choon. He saw active service at Gallipoli and was there killed in action on 29 May 1915. He is buried in the Shrapnel Valley Cemetery at Gallipoli.

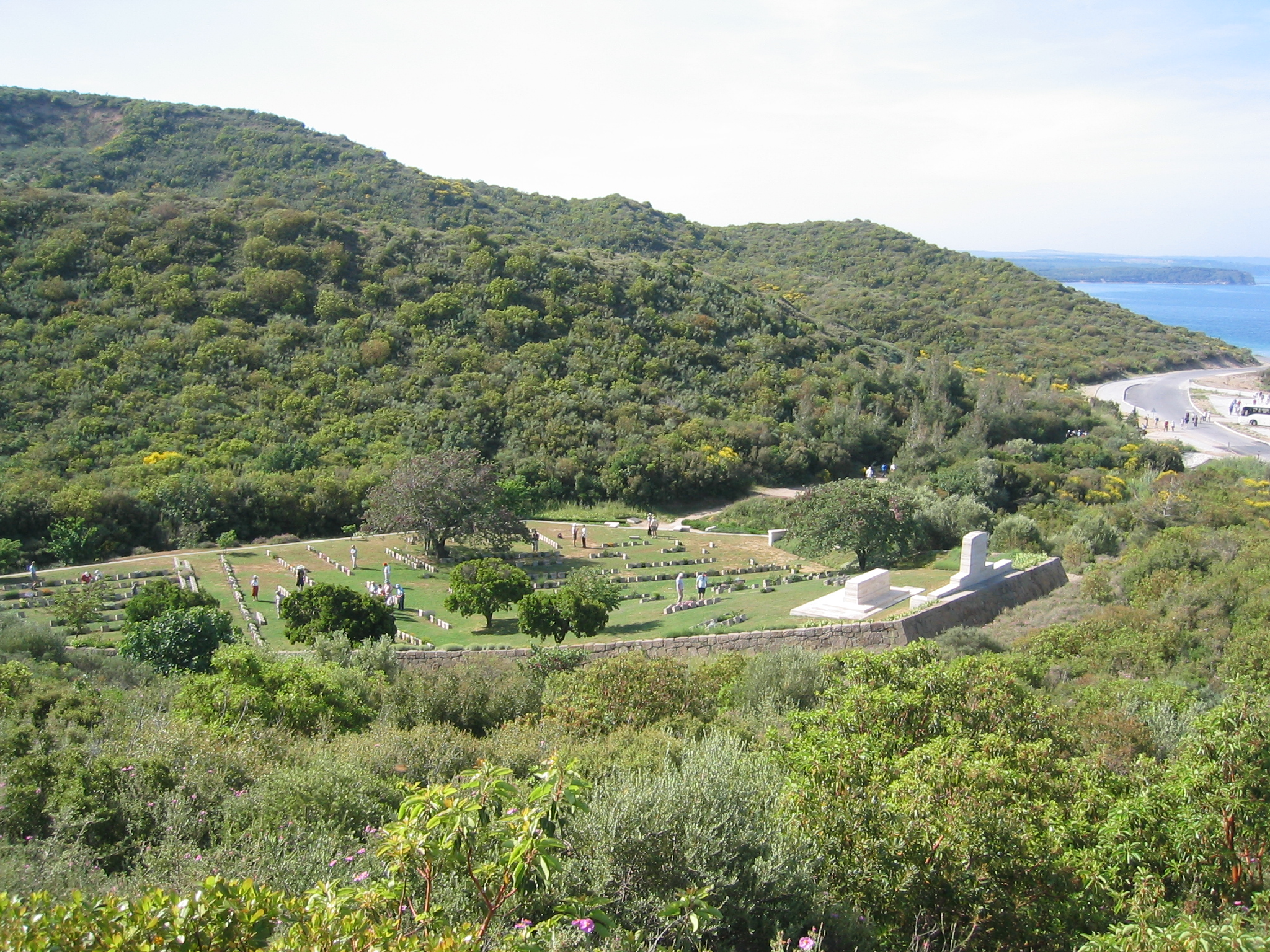
Memorial in Shrapnel Valley where lies Fred Thompson and 526 other Australian fallen

== Sources ==
- Collection (1995) Gordon Bray presents The Spirit of Rugby, Harper Collins Publishers Sydney (J.C Davis article "Patriots of the Battlefield" 1st published in The Referee Sept 1915)
- Fred Thompson's record at the AIF Project
