= Ralph Hill (rugby union) =

Australia international rugby union player (1888–1977)

- Full name: Ralph Baldridge Hill
- Born: 21 January 1888 Sydney, Australia
- Died: 11 January 1977 (aged 88)

Rugby union career
- Position: Wing–forward
Provincial / State sides
Years	Team	Apps	(Points)
- New South Wales
International career
Years	Team	Apps	(Points)
1912–13	Australia		

Ralph Baldridge Hill (21 January 1888 – 11 January 1977) was an Australian international rugby union player.

A Newtown wing–forward, Hill gained national team honours on a 1912 tour of North America, where he made a total of 10 appearances, although none of these were against international opposition. He captained the Metropolitan representative team against a touring NZ Maori team in 1913. His second international opportunity, a 1913 tour of New Zealand, was ruined by an injury sustained before departure and kept him sidelined for the tour's entirety.

Hill was a brother of rugby administrator Bill Hill, who served as NSWRU president.

== See also ==
- List of Australia national rugby union players
