= Jack Meibusch =

Australia international rugby union player (1874–1955)

- Born: John Henry Meibusch; 11 December 1874 Surat, Queensland
- Died: 17 February 1955 (aged 80)
- Notable relative: Lou Meibusch

Rugby union career
- Position: prop
International career
Years	Team	Apps	(Points)
1904	Australia	1	(0)

John Henry Meibusch (11 December 1874 - 17 February 1955) was a rugby union player who represented in the Australia national rugby union team.

Meibusch, a prop, was born in Surat, Queensland and claimed one international rugby cap for Australia, playing against Great Britain, at Sydney, on 30 July 1904. His younger brother Lou Meibusch also made a Wallaby appearance in 1912.
