= Wallach brothers =

The Wallach brothers were a family of eight boys born to Henry and Mary Wallach of Bondi Beach in Sydney, Australia toward the end of the 19th century. Six of the brothers all saw active service in World War I. The fourth and eighth brothers, Clarrie and Neville were both top-grade rugby union players before the War. They both saw action at Gallipoli, were promoted on the Western Front as Captains, were both recipients of the Military Cross and each fell within a week of each other in France in fighting at the time of the Second Battle of Villers-Bretonneux.

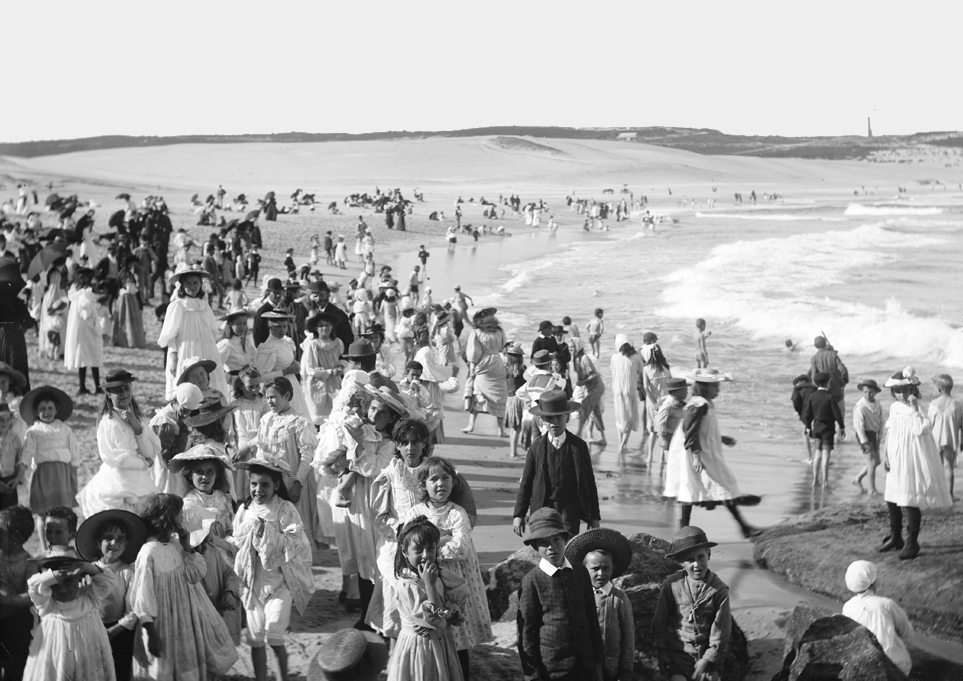
Bondi Beach at the time of the Wallachs' childhood

== Wallach family ==
The family was of German origin. The children were: Bernhard Wallach (1876–1946), Adolph Wallach (1878–1945), Henry Wallach (1879–1937), Florence Wallach (1881–), Emil Wallach (1884–1943), Henrietta Wallach (1886–), Stella Wallach (1888–), Clarence Wallach (1889–1918), Rupert Wallach (1893–), Neville Wallach (1896–1918) and Arthur Wallach (1899–).

The brothers attended Sydney Grammar School and before the war were active in Surf lifesaving at the Bondi and Maroubra Surf Life Saving Clubs.

== Clarence Wallach ==
Clarence Wallach MC was an Australian representative rugby union forward and decorated World War I military officer. He fought at Gallipoli and in France and died of wounds on the Western Front.

=== Rugby career ===
Clarrie's club rugby career was with the Eastern Suburbs RUFC in Sydney where he played as a lock. He made eight state representative appearances for New South Wales and appeared on five occasions between 1913 and 1914 for Australia.

=== Military career ===
Clarrie was commissioned as a Lieutenant in the 19th Battalion, 5th Brigade, of the 2nd Division raised in March 1915, disembarking in June 1915. After training in Egypt, the battalion landed at Anzac Cove on 21 August 1915, and following that took part in the attack on Battle of Hill 60.

On the Western Front Clarrie saw action at the Battle of Pozières in August 1916. In 1918 Clarrie Wallach with the 19th battalion helped to repel the German spring offensive, and it was during this time, on 7 April 1918, that Clarrie by now a captain, would sustain mortal wounds in the very same action around Hangard Wood which saw his 2IC, Lieutenant Percy Storkey earn a Victoria Cross for his actions during the fighting. Clarrie suffering from a compound fracture of his left leg, had gangrene set in and doctors amputated the limb. Wallach's condition deteriorated and he died on 22 April, aged twenty-eight. He is buried in the Etretat Churchyard Extension in Étretat, France.

== Neville Wallach ==
Neville Wallach (1897–1918) MC was also a grade rugby player with the Eastern Suburbs RUFC and an active member of the Bondi Surf Bather's Life Saving Club. He enlisted at aged 18 on 25 January 1915, as a private with the 13th (New South Wales) Infantry Battalion, Australian Imperial Force – the Battalion had been raised in September 1914 only six weeks after the declaration of war. The main strength of the battalion left Australia from Albany in December arriving in Egypt in February 1915. Wallach was enlisted to a force of reinforcements for the 13th and left Sydney on board HMAT A49 Seang Choon on 11 February 1915.

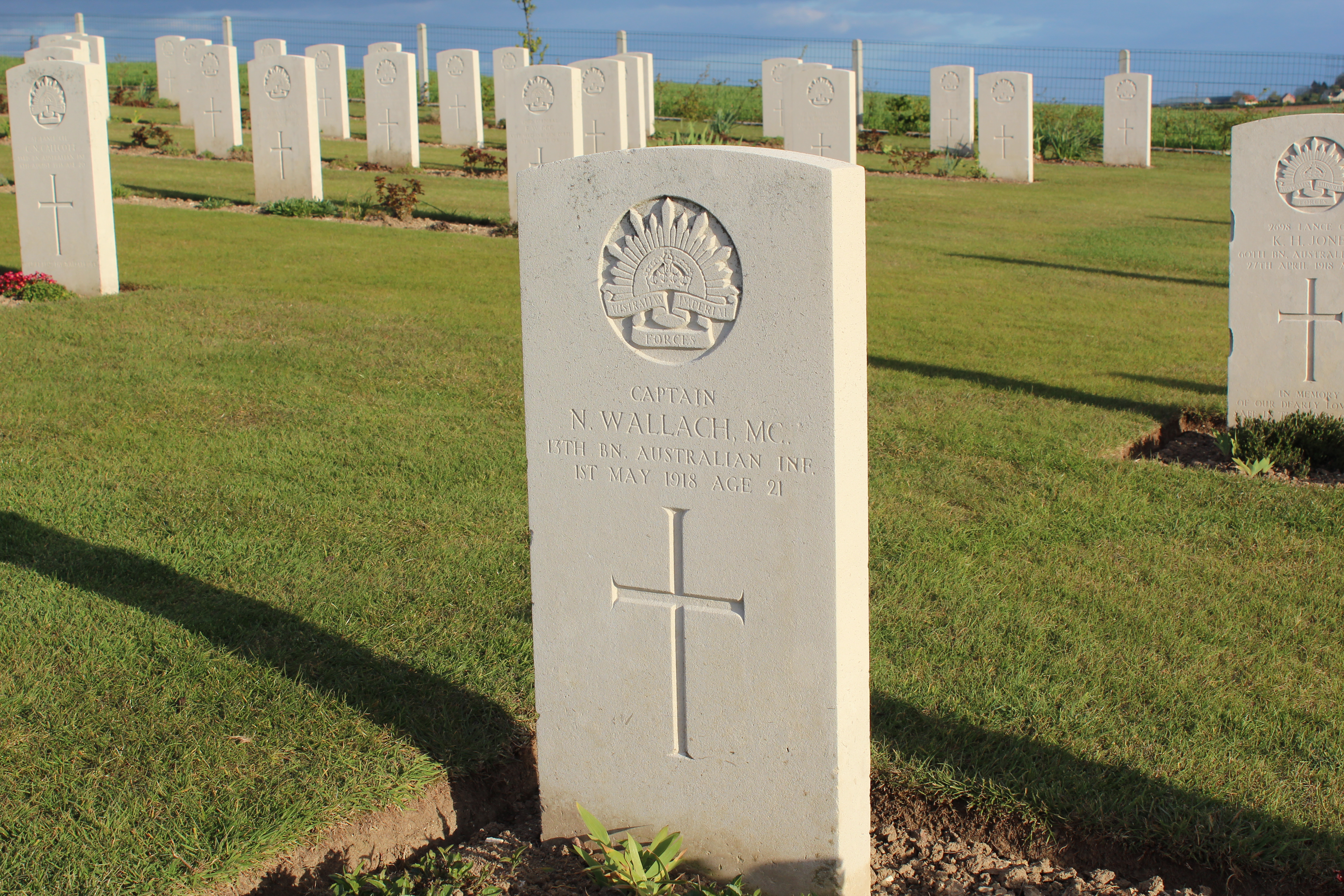
Wallach's grave at V-B cemetery

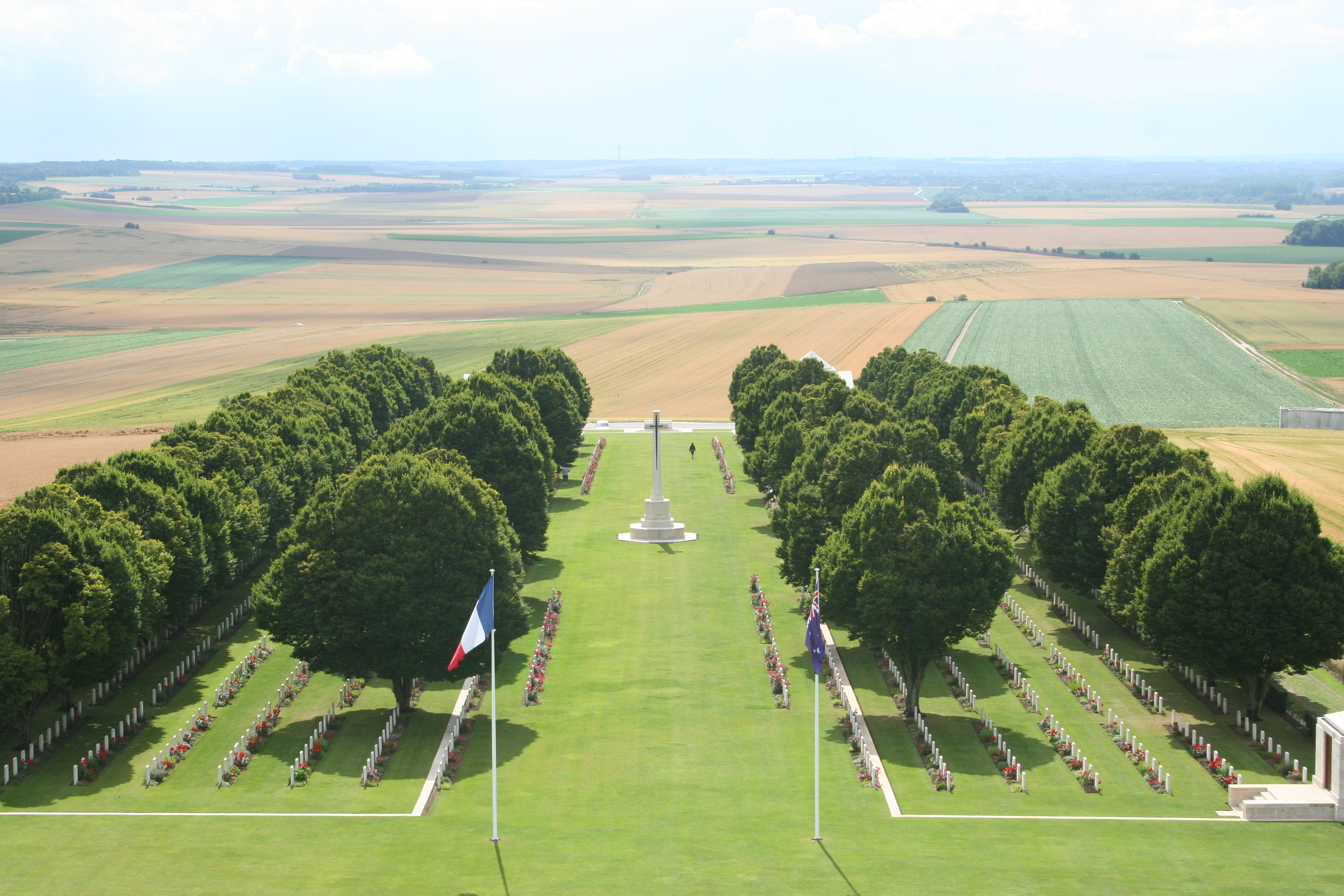
Cemetery in Villers-Bretonneux where lies Neville Wallach and 770 other Australian fallen

Along with the rest of the 4th Brigade, under the command of then Colonel John Monash, the 13th Battalion took part in the Landing at Anzac Cove, arriving late on 25 April 1915. Between May and August, they were then heavily involved in operations to establish and defend the narrow beachhead against Turkish assaults.

After Gallipoli, Neville saw action on the Western Front. He met up with his brother Rupert who was posted to the 13th Battalion. He was twice wounded, was mentioned in despatches, promoted to Captain at age 21 and in April 1917 was awarded the Military Cross for bravery in the 4th Division's assault on the Hindenburg Line in the First Battle of Bullecourt.

The citation noted: He was a Platoon Commander in the attack on the Hindenburg Line near Bullecourt on 11 April 1917 and though he received a bullet through his thigh within one minute of zero, he led his men over 1200 yards of ground swept by shell and machine gun fire.......Captain Wallace is a very capable officer and bears a high reputation for bravery.

He was killed in action on 1 May 1918 in the Second Battle of Villers-Bretonneux. A shell burst at his company headquarters sending a splinter through his head as the officers were sitting down to tea. He is buried in the Villers-Bretonneux Military Cemetery.

== Other fighting brothers ==
=== Henry Wallach ===
Henry (born 1880) was living in Hobart and aged 35 when he enlisted as a private in the 12th Battalion. He embarked from Melbourne on HMAT A56 Palermo in September 1916. He survived the war and returned a corporal in July 1918.

=== Rupert Wallach ===
Rupert (born 1893) enlisted at very the beginning of the war in August 1914. He joined the Australian Naval & Military Expeditionary Force (Tropical Unit), C Company. Under the command of Colonel William Holmes, the AN&MEF departed Sydney aboard HMAS Berrima in August 1914. Rupert Wallach saw action in New Guinea, Gallipoli and France during the war.

=== Arthur Wallach ===
Arthur Wallach (born 1897) enlisted as a Gunner in Machine Gun Company 1 in January 1916. He left Sydney in HMAT Bennalla in May 1916. He survived the war, returning home in August 1918.

== See also ==
- List of international rugby union players killed in action during the First World War

== Bibliography ==
- Collection (1995) Gordon Bray presents The Spirit of Rugby, Harper Collins Publishers, Sydney.
- Zavos, Spiro (2000) Golden Wallabies – The Story of Australia's Rugby World Champions, Penguin Books, Ringwood, Victoria.
- Carlyon, Les (2006) The Great War Macmillan Publishing, Sydney.
- Brawley, Sean (2008) Bondi SLSC "100 Years of Tradition"
