= Copper Kent =

Australia international rugby union player (1891–1966)

- Born: Allan W. Kent; 10 February 1891 Toowoomba, Queensland
- Died: 28 May 1966 (aged 75)

Rugby union career
- Position: flanker
International career
| Years | Team | Apps | (Points) |
| 1912 | Wallabies | 1 | (0) |

Allan W. "Copper" Kent (10 February 1891 – 28 May 1966) was a rugby union player who represented Australia.

Kent, a flanker, was born in Toowoomba, Queensland and claimed 1 international rugby cap for Australia.

== See also ==
- 1912 Australia rugby union tour of Canada and the United States
