= Harald Baker =

- Born: Harald William Baker; 29 September 1882 Paddington, New South Wales
- Died: 17 October 1962 (aged 80)
- Notable relative: Snowy Baker

Rugby union career
- Position: flanker
International career
Years	Team	Apps	(Points)
1914	Wallabies	3	(0)

Harald William Baker (29 September 1882 – 17 October 1962) was a rugby union player who represented Australia.

Baker, a flanker, was born in Paddington, New South Wales and claimed three international rugby caps for Australia. He was the brother of the multi-talented Australian sporting star Snowy Baker.

Baker and Jimmy Clarken are remembered for their heroic rescues in the Coogee surf disaster of 28 January 1911. In this context his name is often found misspelled as "Harold Baker".
