= Pat Murphy (rugby union) =

Australia international rugby union player (1878–1945)

- Born: Peter James Benjamin Murphy circa 1878
- Died: circa 1945

Rugby union career
- Position: lock
International career
Years	Team	Apps	(Points)
1910–14	Wallabies	9	(0)

Peter James Benjamin "Pat" Murphy (circa 1878 – circa 1945) was a rugby union player who represented Australia.

Murphy, a lock, was born in and claimed a total of 9 international rugby caps for Australia. His brother William was also an Australian rugby union representative player.
