= Reg Taylor (rugby union) =

New Zealand rugby union player

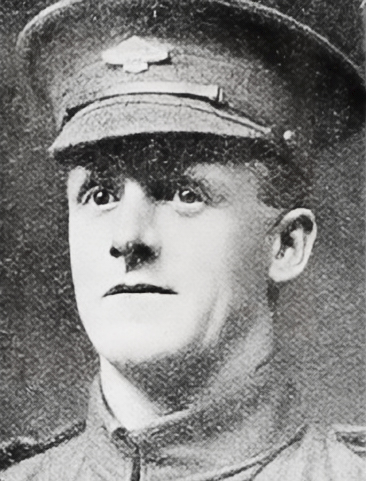
- Taylor during World War I
- Born: Reginald Taylor; 23 March 1889 Hillsborough, Taranaki, New Zealand
- Died: 20 June 1917 (aged 28) Mesen, Belgium

Rugby union career
- Position: Wing-forward
Provincial / State sides
Years	Team	Apps	(Points)
1910–1914	Taranaki		
International career
Years	Team	Apps	(Points)
1913	New Zealand	2	(3)

Reginald Taylor (23 March 1889 – 20 June 1917) was a New Zealand rugby union player. A wing-forward, Taylor represented Taranaki at a provincial level, and was a member of the New Zealand national side, the All Blacks, in 1913. He played two matches for the All Blacks, both international matches against the touring Australian side.

Taylor served in World War I as a lance corporal in the Wellington Infantry Regiment. He was killed in action at Mesen on 20 June 1917, and buried nearby at Underhill Farm Cemetery.
