= Jimmy Clarken =

Australia international rugby union player

- Born: James C. Clarken; 19 July 1876 Thames, New Zealand
- Died: 31 July 1953 (aged 77) Sydney

Rugby union career
- Position: prop
International career
Years	Team	Apps	(Points)
1905-10	Wallabies	4	(0)

James C. Clarken (19 July 1876 – 31 July 1953) was a rugby union player who represented Australia.

Clarken, a prop, was born in Thames, New Zealand and claimed a total of 4 international rugby caps for Australia His debut game was against New Zealand, at Dunedin, on 2 September 1905.

Clarken and Harald Baker (brother of R. L. "Snowy" Baker) are remembered for their heroic rescues in the Coogee surf disaster of 28 January 1911.

== See also ==
- 1912 Australia rugby union tour of Canada and the United States
