= Jim McNeece =

New Zealand rugby union player

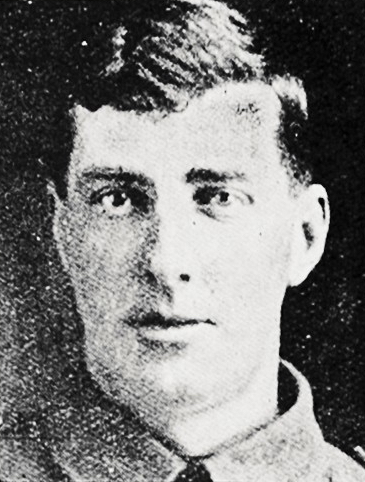
- Born: James McNeece; 24 December 1885 Invercargill, New Zealand
- Died: 21 June 1917 (aged 31) Rouen, France
- Height: 1.88 m (6 ft 2 in)
- Weight: 92 kg (203 lb)
- Occupation: Farmer

Rugby union career
- Position: Forward
Provincial / State sides
Years	Team	Apps	(Points)
1905–1913	Southland	10	
International career
Years	Team	Apps	(Points)
1913–1914	New Zealand	5	(3)

James McNeece (24 December 1885 – 21 June 1917) was a New Zealand rugby union player. A forward, McNeece represented Southland at a provincial level, and was a member of the New Zealand national side, the All Blacks, in 1913 and 1914. He played 11 matches for the All Blacks including five internationals. He served as a private with 2nd Battalion, Otago Regiment, New Zealand Expeditionary Force, during World War I, and died in hospital of wounds received during the Battle of Messines.
