= Ward Prentice =

Australia international rugby union & league player and cricketer

- Born: Warden Selby Prentice; 30 July 1886 Homebush, New South Wales
- Died: 26 February 1969 (aged 82) Rosebery, New South Wales
- Notable relative(s): Archie, Clarrie (Brothers)

Rugby union career
- Position(s): centre, first five-eighth
Senior career
Years	Team	Apps	(Points)
	Western Suburbs	129	
–	Eastern Suburbs	2	
Provincial / State sides
Years	Team	Apps	(Points)
1908-12	New South Wales	25	
International career
Years	Team	Apps	(Points)
1908-12	Australia	6	(3)
- Rugby league career

Playing information
- Position: Five-eighth
Club
Years	Team	Pld	T	G	FG	P
1920	Western Suburbs	5				11

Warden Selby Prentice (30 July 1886 – 26 February 1969) was an Australian sportsman who captained Australia at rugby union and New South Wales at first-class cricket and also played first-grade rugby league for the Western Suburbs Magpies.

== Rugby union career ==
Ward Prentice and four of his brothers played first grade rugby union in Sydney at various times and two others played in the lower grades. Ward and two of his brothers later played first grade rugby league. Ward's club career started with his local Western Suburbs RUFC and he made his representative debut in 1908 for New South Wales against a touring Anglo-Welsh side.

In 1908 he was selected in the 31-man squad for the 1908–09 Australia rugby union tour of the British Isles and France. Chris McKivat was the standout incumbent five-eighth even though McKivat had greater career success at half-back. The selectors generally opted for Fred Wood, the tour vice-captain at half, with McKivat at fly-half. Prentice made a handful of tour match appearances at centre and at five-eighth and the Howell reference quotes Pollard "he distinguished himself by his unselfish team play and clever-cross-kicking for his loose forwards and wingers.....and was an astute cover-defender who on numerous occasions saved certain tries by launching himself at opposition wingers when they were set to score". In the tour match before the first Test Prentice scored the try of the match stepping through the whole team before touching down in the corner

Prentice made his Test debut against Wales at Cardiff Arms Park on 12 December 1908 at five-eighth and paired with McKivat. He set up the Wallabies' first try scored by Tom Richards though Australia lost the Test 6–9. Prentice had to leave the field twice for treatment after being kicked in the mouth and his injury caused him to miss the next five tour matches. In January he earned his second cap in the Test against England. He played at centre in the 9–3 win. By the end of the tour which also took in Canada and the US, Prentice had played in 13 of the 35 matches.

In 1910 he represented for Australia in three internationals against New Zealand. His representative career highlight came in 1912 when he was selected as touring captain of the Wallabies squad for the 1912 Australia rugby union tour of Canada and the United States. The tour was a disappointment with the squad billeted out in college fraternity houses where the hospitality played havoc with team discipline and as result the team lost against two California University sides and three Canadian provincial sides. They rose to the occasion for the sole Test of the tour against the United States where Prentice earned his final cap and kicked a penalty goal to score his only international career points.

All told Ward Prentice played for Australia on thirty-two occasions including six Tests, one as captain.

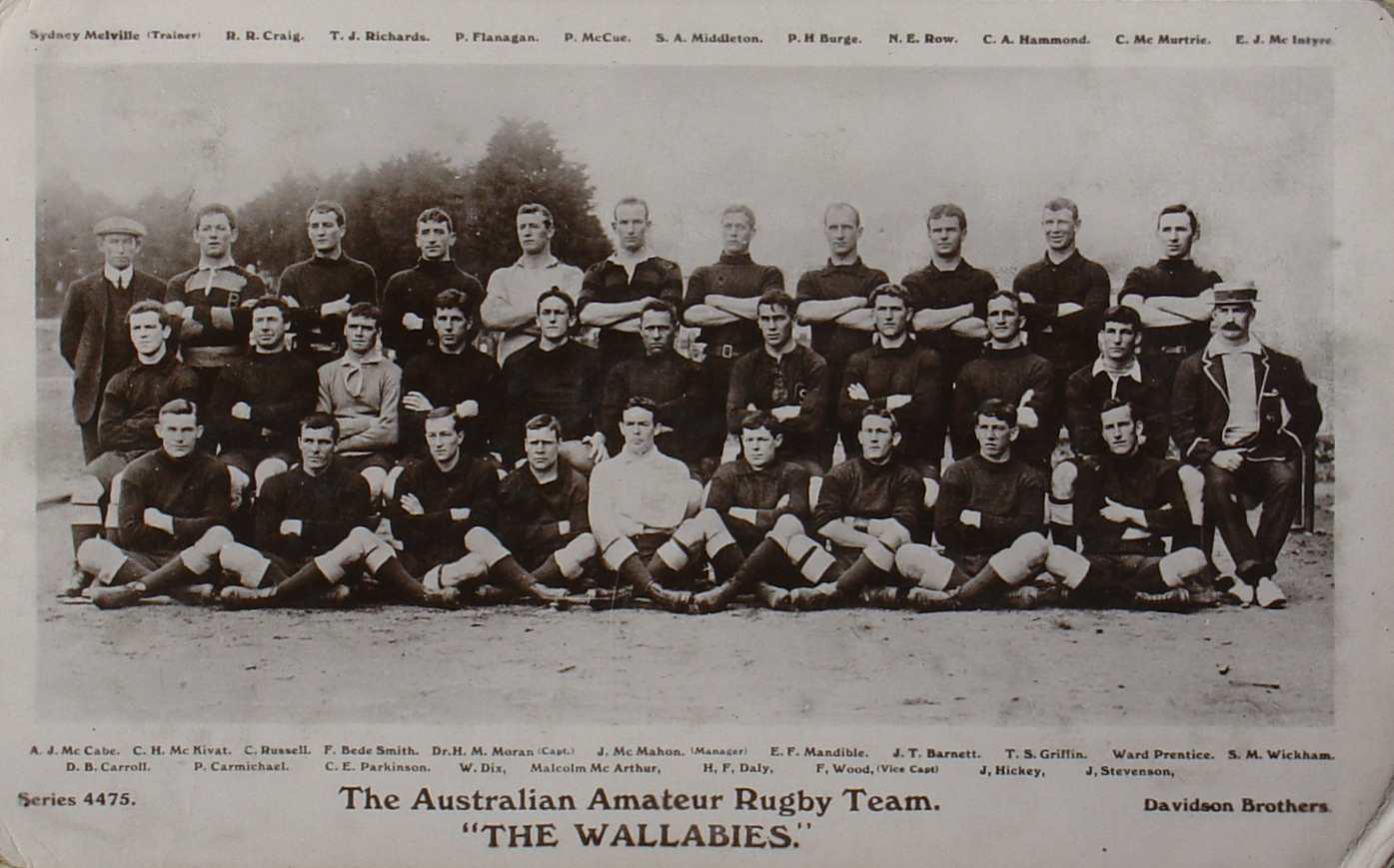
Prentice middle row 2nd from right, with the 1908 Wallaby tour squad

== Cricket career ==
His first-class cricket debut came in 1913 when he kept wicket for Victor Trumper's New South Wales side, against Queensland at the Sydney Cricket Ground. Although he fell for a duck in his only innings, he took the catches of both Queensland opening batsmen. Prentice had to wait until 1921 for his second and final first-class appearance when he captained New South Wales against the same opponents and on the same ground. Again playing as a wicket-keeper, Prentice made another duck and didn't take a catch.

== Rugby league career ==
In 1920, Prentice joined his brother Clarrie a Western Suburbs rugby league stalwart who played 115 games with the club in a war-interrupted career over nine years. Ward played five first grade games for the Magpies in the New South Wales Rugby League in season 1920. Their older brother Archie had also played for the club (27 games) in 1915–16.

== See also ==
- List of New South Wales representative cricketers
- 1912 Australia rugby union tour of Canada and the United States

== Footnotes ==
Preceded by Sydney Middleton	Australian national rugby union captain 1912	Succeeded by Ted Fahey
