= Daniel Carroll (rugby union) =

Australia & US international rugby union player (1892–1956)

Daniel Carroll DSC
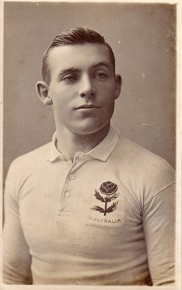
- 1908 Wallaby
- Born: Daniel Brendon Carroll; 17 November 1888 Melbourne, Victoria
- Died: 5 August 1956 (aged 67) New Orleans, Louisiana
- School: St Aloysius Sydney
- University: Sydney University
- Occupation(s): Geologist, Oil industry

Rugby union career
- Position(s): Centre, Fly-half Winger, Scrum-half
Amateur team(s)
Years	Team	Apps	(Points)
- St George Rugby Union
Provincial / State sides
Years	Team	Apps	(Points)
- New South Wales
International career
Years	Team	Apps	(Points)
1908–12	Australia	2	(3)
1913–20	United States	3	(0)
Coaching career
- Years: Team
- 1920: United States
Medal record
Men's rugby union
Olympic Games
Representing Australasia
Gold medal – first place	1908 London	Team competition
Representing the United States
Gold medal – first place	1920 Antwerp	Team competition

Daniel Brendon Carroll DSC (17 November 1888, possibly 1892 – 5 August 1956) was an Australian national representative rugby union player. He was a dual Olympic gold medalist, winning in rugby at the 1908 Summer Olympics for Australia and also winning gold for the United States at the 1920 Summer Olympics.

== Age ==
He is erroneously referred to in some records as the youngest ever Australian representative rugby player due to a birthdate error in the Olympic records database. He served in the American Army as a lieutenant in World War I and lived out his life in the US, working in the mining/petroleum industry.

== Schooling and early rugby ==
Carroll was born at Flemington, Victoria. His family relocated to Sydney during his early childhood and he was educated at St Aloysius' College (Sydney) playing rugby in the school's first XV and then at Sydney University where he studied dentistry. His club rugby was played with St George in southern Sydney. He was a winger at that time and in that position made his Australian representatives appearances. Later in his career, he played at fly-half.

== Australian rugby representative ==
He was selected in Australia's inaugural national rugby team to tour the northern hemisphere, Paddy Moran's first Wallabies for the 1908–09 Australia rugby union tour of Britain. He was the youngest member of the tour squad at 20 years. Carroll played in the first test of the tour, the 6–9 loss to Wales at Cardiff Arms Park, which was the first rugby test played by an Australian team on British soil.

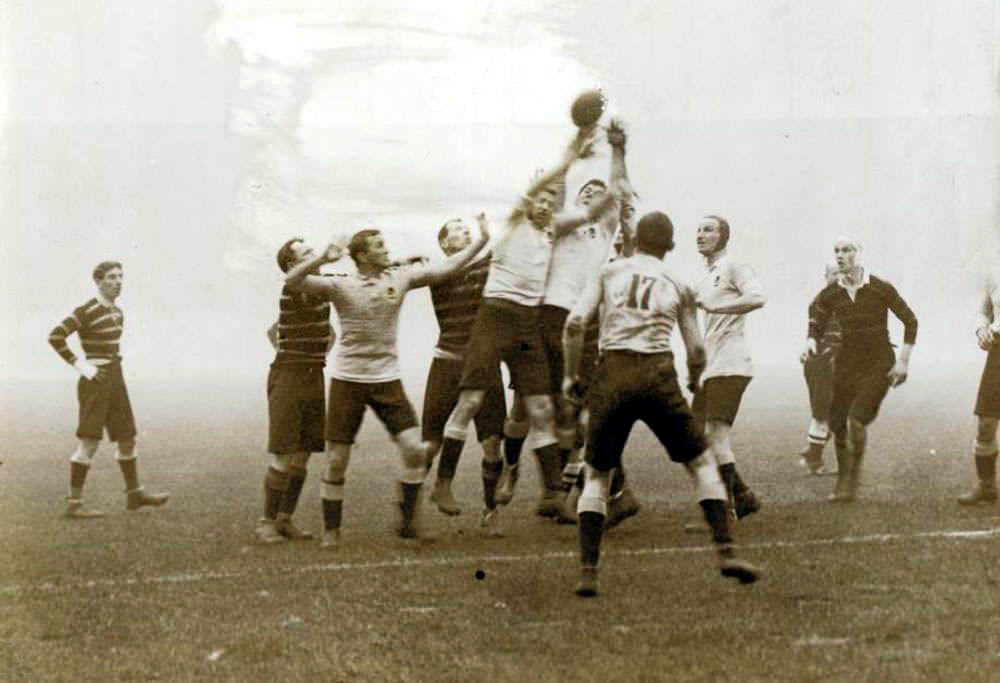
1908 Olympic Gold Final Wallabies v Cornwall.

At the time, the rugby tournament for the London Olympics game may not have appeared to be of great significance. Australia had already beaten Cornwall, the British county champions, early in the tour, and Scotland, Ireland and France had all turned down the Rugby Football Union's invitation to participate in the Olympic bouts. Neither the tour captain, Moran, nor the vice-captain Fred Wood played, so Chris McKivat led the Wallabies to an easy 32–3 victory and to Olympic glory, with each Wallaby in that match thereafter an Olympic gold medalist. Carroll scored two tries in the match.

At the tour's end, McKivat would lead fourteen of the Wallabies into the professional ranks with the fledgling rugby league code in Sydney, but Carroll stayed loyal to the amateur game and was rewarded in 1912 when he was again selected in the Wallabies squad for the 1912 Australia rugby union tour of Canada and the United States. The tour was a disappointment with the squad billeted out in college fraternity houses where the hospitality played havoc with team discipline and as result the team lost against two California University sides and three Canadian provincial sides. They rose to the occasion for the sole test of the tour – the November 1912 clash against the United States at Berkeley, won 12–8. Carroll played at fly-half in that match and scored a try. Carroll thus made two test career appearances for Australia.

== American rugby and war service ==
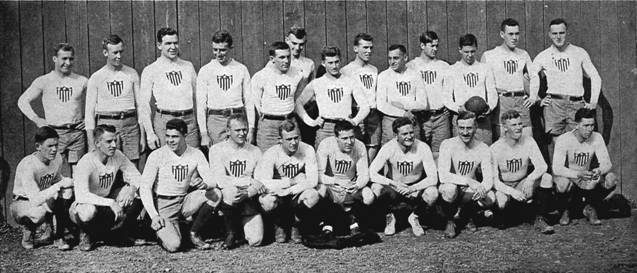
Carroll with the US team in 1913 (pictured back row, first from left)

Carroll stayed on in America after the 1912 tour. He played for All-America against the All Blacks in 1913, a test won by NZ 51–3. He served in the American Army as a lieutenant in World War I and won a Distinguished Service Cross.

He completed a degree in geology at Stanford University in 1920. He was coaching rugby at the university when he was selected as the playing coach of the USA side selected for the 1920 Summer Olympics. He won a gold medal at Antwerp in that team playing at fly-half. He made three rugby union test career appearances for the United States between 1913 and 1920.

Zavos quotes an article from a local Stanford paper of 1935, which reports that Carroll played four years of rugby at Stanford and one year of American football. He won his letter in rugby in 1913, 1914 and 1915. He played his last game of rugby in 1921 when a pick-up team visited British Columbia.

== Post playing ==
After Stanford, Carroll furthered his education at Oxford and the Royal School of Mines in England. In 1921, he took up an appointment with Standard Oil and remained with the company until his retirement.

Carroll married Helen Warden from Great Falls, Montana in 1927 and had one son, Daniel – who is deceased. Helen died in 1941, and Carroll died in New Orleans in 1956.

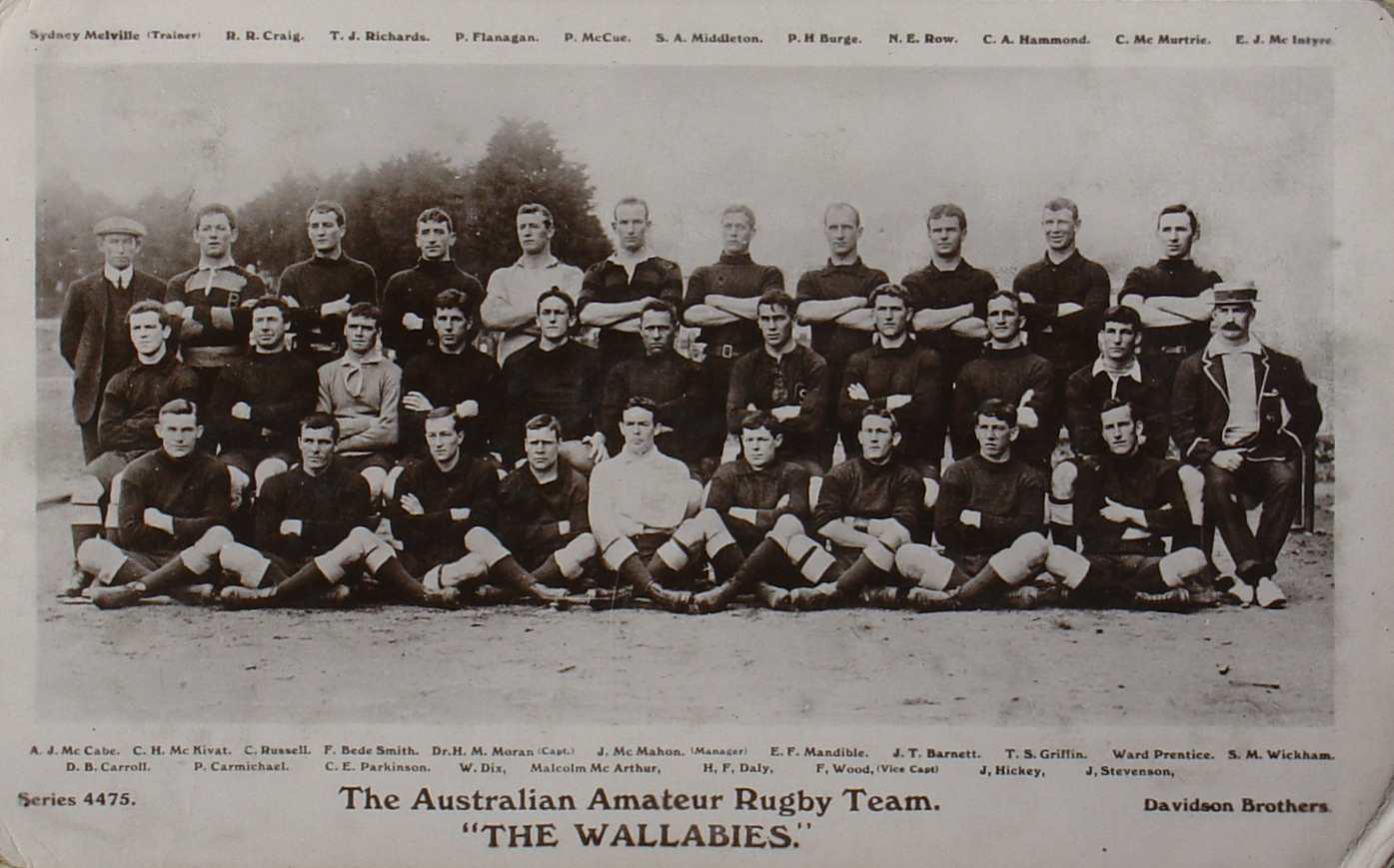
Carroll front row left, with the 1908 Wallaby tour squad

== See also ==
- 1912 Australia rugby union tour of Canada and the United States
- Rugby union at the 1908 Summer Olympics
