= Clarrie Wallach =

Australian rugby union player

- Born: Clarence Wallach; November 1889 Sydney
- Died: 22 April 1918 (aged 28) Hangard Wood, Somme, France
- School: Sydney Grammar School
- Notable relative: Neville

Rugby union career
- Position: Lock forward
Senior career
Years	Team	Apps	(Points)
1910–14	Easts		
Provincial / State sides
Years	Team	Apps	(Points)
1913–14	New South Wales	10	
International career
Years	Team	Apps	(Points)
1913–14	Wallabies	5	(0)

Clarence "Clarrie" Wallach MC (November 1889 – 22 April 1918) was an Australian representative rugby union forward and decorated World War I military officer. He fought at Gallipoli and in France and died on the Western Front. He was the second oldest of a number of brothers who served during World War I.

== Rugby career ==
Born in November 1889 in Sydney, Clarence Wallach, known as Clarrie, played club rugby for Eastern Suburbs RUFC as a lock. He made eight state representative appearances for New South Wales and appeared on five occasions between 1913 and 1914 for Australia.

== First World War ==
Wallach was commissioned as a lieutenant in the 19th Battalion, 5th Brigade, of the 2nd Division raised in March 1915, disembarking in June 1915. After training in Egypt, the battalion landed at Anzac Cove on 21 August 1915, and following that took part in the attack on Battle of Hill 60.

Wallach wrote a letter home from Gallipoli which was published in the sporting paper The Referee. He described hearing of the deaths of his Eastern Suburbs clubmates Harold George and Fred Thompson from William Tasker, another rugby contemporary who served at Gallipoli and who, like Wallach, would die on the Western Front."We arrived at Heliopolis about three weeks ago. We have been in some pretty solid work, but expect to go into the real stuff next week. All the rugby union men are well here, from the Major down to the privates. Twit Tasker told me how Harold George died the death of deaths – a hero's – never beaten till the whistle went". Clarrie kept a diary at Gallipoli which is referred to by Carlyon for its glib style, e.g."Nothing of note, two skittled by shrapnel"

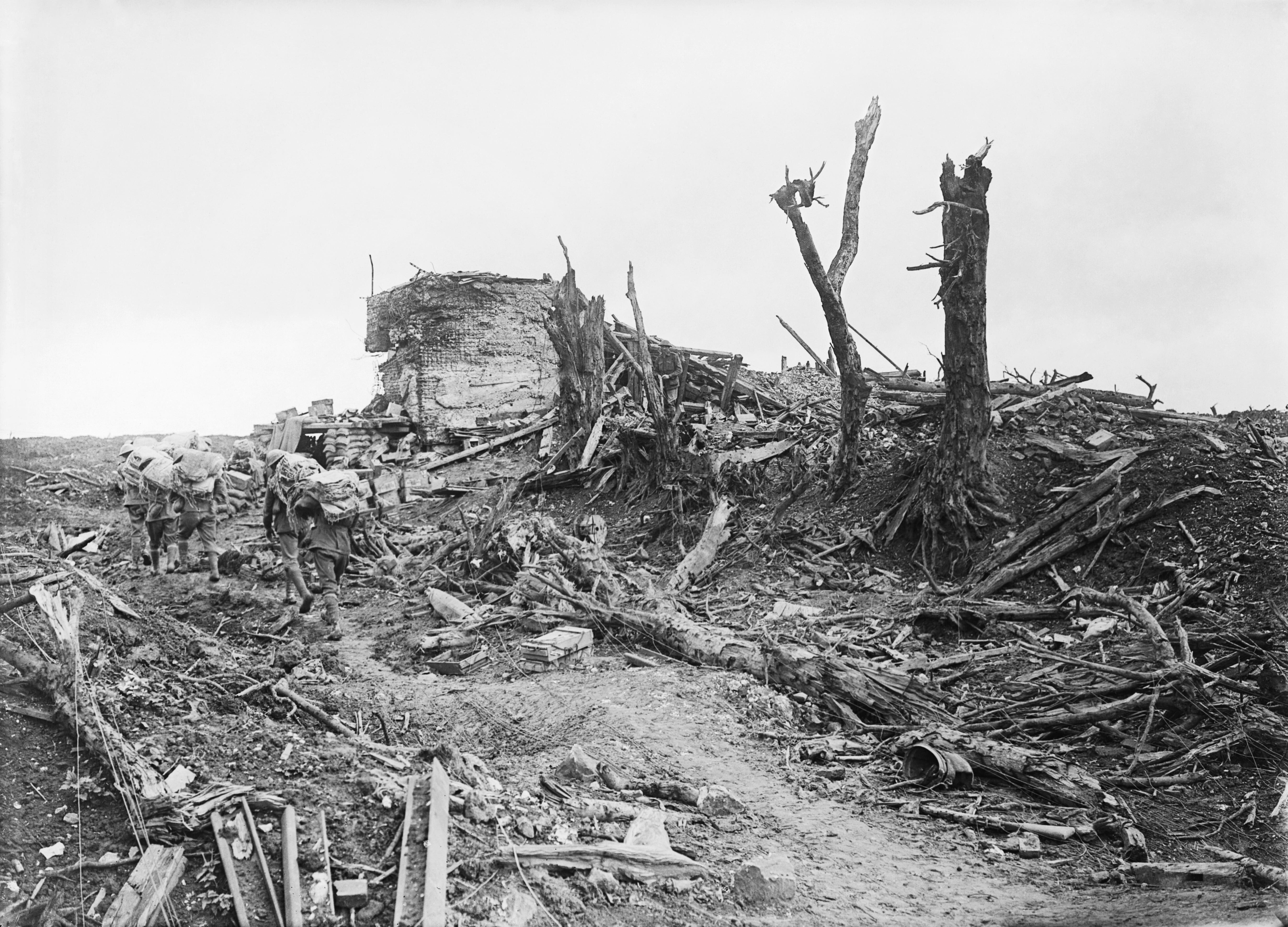
The "Gibraltar" bunker, Pozières, in late August 1916.

On the Western Front Wallach saw action at the Battle of Pozières in August 1916. He named the trench he occupied at Pozières "Blancmange Trench" because it changed shape every time he visited it. In 1918, the 19th Battalion helped to repel the German spring offensive, and it was during this time, on 7 April 1918, that Wallach, by now a captain and commander of a company, was involved in an attack around Hangard Wood.

The attack was intended to be supported by a barrage behind which the Australians were to begin advancing at 4.55 am. On Wallach's section of the front line no barrage fell ahead of his company. He nonetheless led his men across 400 yards of open country toward the wood. German machine gunners, untouched by shells, opened fire on the advance. By the time the company reached the edge of the wood one man in four had been hit. Wallach fell with wounds to both knees. His second in command, Lieutenant Percy Storkey was following 75 yards behind Wallach and took command. He pushed into undergrowth with eleven men trying to get behind the Germans. They successfully surprised an enemy position containing 80 to 100 men, driving them out, killing and wounding about 30 and capturing three officers, 50 men, and one machine gun. Storkey was later awarded a Victoria Cross for his role during the fighting.

Wallach had suffered a compound fracture of his left leg. Gas gangrene set in and doctors amputated the limb. His temperature soared to 105 degrees. He was given a blood transfusion to try to save the other leg but eventually it was removed as well. Wallach began to weaken, due to shock. He died on 22 April, aged 28. He is buried in the Etretat Churchyard Extension in Étretat, France.
