= George Pugh (rugby union) =

Australia international rugby union player (1890–1916)

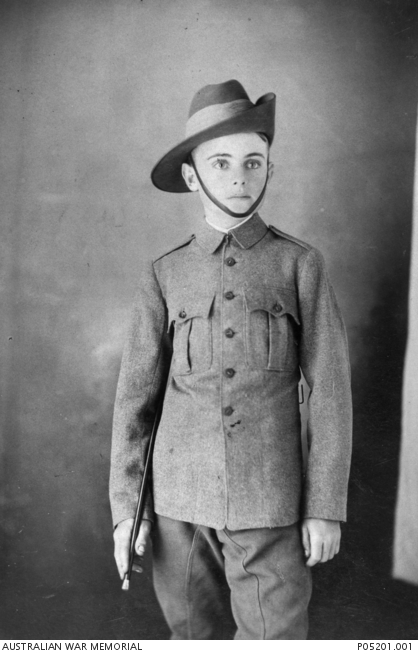
- Born: George Harold Pugh; 16 January 1890 Glebe, New South Wales
- Died: 5 September 1916 (aged 26) France
- Height: 5 ft 11 in (180 cm)

Rugby union career
- Position: lock
International career
Years	Team	Apps	(Points)
1912	Wallabies	1	(0)

Lt. George Harold Pugh (16 January 1890 – 5 September 1916) was a rugby union player who represented Australia.

Pugh, a lock, was born in Glebe, New South Wales and claimed 1 international rugby cap for Australia.

Pugh enlisted in the British army in 1912 and trained for six weeks in Liverpool, and joined the Liverpool Regiment as a second lieutenant. He joined the Australian Expeditionary Force in 1915. He was killed in action in the First World War while serving with the 4th Battalion of the Australian Infantry. He is buried at the Railway Dugouts Burial Ground in Ypres.

== See also ==
- List of international rugby union players killed in action during the First World War
- 1912 Australia rugby union tour of Canada and the United States
