= Doddy Gray =

New Zealand rugby union player

- Born: Donaldson Gray; 23 September 1880 Christchurch, New Zealand
- Died: 16 April 1961 (aged 80) Christchurch, New Zealand
- Occupation: Timber worker

Rugby union career
- Position: First five-eighth
Provincial / State sides
Years	Team	Apps	(Points)
1900–1915	Canterbury	56	
International career
Years	Team	Apps	(Points)
1908–1913	New Zealand	3	(9)

Donaldson Gray (23 September 1880 – 16 April 1961) was a New Zealand rugby union player. A first five-eighth, Gray represented Canterbury at a provincial level, and was a member of the New Zealand national side, the All Blacks, in 1908 and 1913. He played 14 matches for the All Blacks including three internationals.

A timber worker, Gray died in Christchurch on 16 April 1961, and was buried at Sydenham Cemetery.
