= Jimmy Flynn (rugby union) =

Australia international rugby union player

- Born: James P. Flynn; 23 June 1894 Brisbane, Queensland
- Died: 1965 Australia
- School: Gregory Terrace

Rugby union career
Senior career
Years	Team	Apps	(Points)
1912–14	Brothers Old Boys		
Provincial / State sides
Years	Team	Apps	(Points)
1912–14	Queensland		(17)
International career
Years	Team	Apps	(Points)
1912–1914	Wallabies	2	(0)

James P. Flynn (23 June 1894 – 1965) was an Australian rugby union player, a state and national representative centre and half-back. His representative career lasted from 1912 to 1914 and he captained the national side on one occasion in 1913, the youngest player to ever do so. He was later a Queensland state selector.

== Rugby career ==
Born in Brisbane, Queensland, Flynn was schooled at St Joseph's College, Gregory Terrace. His first grade career was played with the Brothers Old Boys club in Brisbane. He was a prodigious talent and was first selected to represent at Queensland state level one day before his 18th birthday. In that 1912 interstate series Queensland won dual home game victories for the first time since 1901.

Flynn was selected in the Wallabies squad for the 1912 Australia rugby union tour of Canada and the United States. The tour was a disappointment with the squad billeted out in college fraternity houses where the hospitality played havoc with team discipline and as result the team lost against two California University sides and three Canadian provincial sides. Flynn played in ten of the tour matches but was not selected in the sole Test. He suffered the ignominy of being sent off in the match against a Combined Vancouver-Victoria side and Howell suggests he was probably the first Australian half-back on tour to do so.

He had state representative success in 1913 with appearances against the New Zealand Maori and against New South Wales. Still aged only nineteen, he captained Queensland to victory in the second match of that year's interstate series kicking four goals including a conversion on the bell to snatch a one-point victory. His Test debut was made in 1914 when he played in both fixtures against the touring All Blacks. In the second Test on 1 August 1914 he had the honour of captaining the Wallaby side and at twenty years and seven months his record still stands as the youngest man to do so.

The Great War interrupted Flynn's career as rugby in Australia effectively ceased in that time. Post-war he made two appearances for Australia against an AIF side in 1919. Although rugby would stay in demise in Queensland until 1929, Flynn had a hand in its rebirth as a Queensland and national selector in 1929 and 1930.

He claimed two international rugby caps for Australia.

== See also ==
- 1912 Australia rugby union tour of Canada and the United States

== Footnotes ==
Preceded by Fred Wood	Australian national rugby union captain 1913	Succeeded by Willie Watson
