= Larry Dwyer =

Australia international rugby union player

- Born: Lawrence Joseph Dwyer; 2 February 1884 Orange, New South Wales
- Died: August 1964 Orange, NSW
- School: Patrician Brothers Orange
- Occupation: Legal clerk

Rugby union career
Amateur team(s)
Years	Team	Apps	(Points)
- Orange Waratahs
Provincial / State sides
Years	Team	Apps	(Points)
1909-1919	NSW	31	
International career
Years	Team	Apps	(Points)
1910–14	Wallabies	8	(4)

Lawrence Joseph Dwyer (2 February 1884 – August 1964) was an Australian rugby union player, a state and national representative fullback who captained the Wallabies in 1913.

Dwyer, a fullback, was born in Orange, New South Wales. He was schooled at the Patrician Brothers School in Orange but left school at age 12 and worked as a clerk in a solicitor's office while playing rugby for the Orange Waratahs club.

== Rugby career ==
Dwyer first came to public notice playing for a Western Districts representative side of country New South Wales in 1908. He made his New South Wales representative debut in 1910 appearing in two games against a touring All Blacks side playing alongside other future Wallaby captains in Sydney Middleton, Ward Prentice, Ted Fahey and Fred Wood. His performances in those matches saw him picked to make his international debut for Australia in a Test match against those same touring New Zealand All Blacks in Sydney on 25 June 1910. He was picked for all three Test matches of the tour and gave an outstanding defensive performance in the 2nd Test which Australian won 11–0. He made further state appearances for New South Wales that year and was selected in a Central-Western representative side which met a touring American Universities team.

He was selected in the Wallabies squad for the 1912 Australia rugby union tour of Canada and the United States. The tour was a disappointment with the squad billeted out in college fraternity houses where the hospitality played havoc with team discipline and as result the team lost against two California University sides and three Canadian provincial sides. In 1913 he was picked at captain for New South Wales and for Western Districts in matches against the visiting New Zealand national side.

The pinnacle of Dwyer's representative career was in 1913 when he was selected to captain the 1913 Australia rugby union tour of New Zealand on a tour of New Zealand. He played in three tour matches before being injured and consequently missed the first two Tests of the tour. He was back for two more tour games and the third Test which Australia won 16–5. He made three further Test appearances in 1914 when New Zealand toured Australia at the outbreak of World War I.

Dwyer played thirty-one times for New South Wales in a ten-year career that continued until he was thirty-five. He claimed a career total of twenty-four appearances for Australia, six as captain. Eight of those games were international Test caps, one as captain.

Preceded by Ted Fahey	Australian national rugby union captain 1913	Succeeded by Fred Wood
