= Percy Storkey =

New Zealander recipient of the Victoria Cross (1893–1969)

Percy Storkey VC
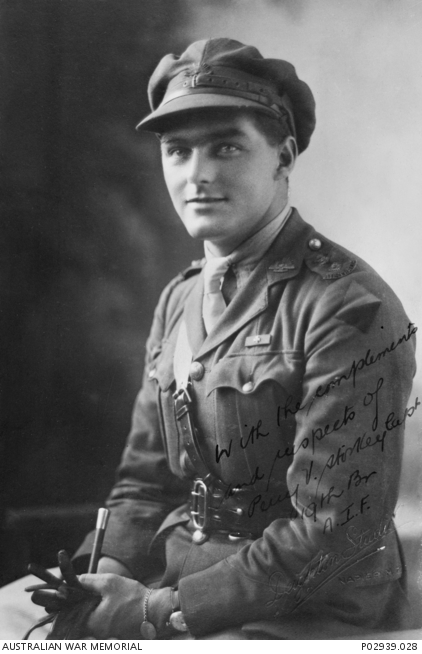
- Captain Percy Storkey VC, 1918
- Born: 9 September 1893; Napier, New Zealand
- Died: 3 October 1969 (aged 78); Teddington, Middlesex, England
- Military career
- Allegiance: Australia
- Branch: Australian Army
- Service years: 1915–19
- Rank: Captain
- Units: 19th Battalion
- Conflicts: First World War; Western Front; Battle of Passchendaele
- Awards: Victoria Cross
- Other work: Lawyer, judge

Percy Valentine Storkey, VC (9 September 1893 – 3 October 1969) was a New Zealand-born Australian recipient of the Victoria Cross (VC), the highest award for gallantry in the face of the enemy that can be awarded to British and Commonwealth forces.

Born in Napier in New Zealand, Storkey moved to Australia in 1911. He was a law student at the University of Sydney when the First World War began. He volunteered for the Australian Imperial Force (AIF) in May 1915 and was posted to the 19th Battalion. He saw action on the Western Front, including during the Battle of Passchendaele in 1917. It was during the German spring offensive of 1918 that he performed the actions that led to his award of the VC. He finished the war as a captain. Discharged from the AIF, Storkey returned to his legal studies and became a crown prosecutor for the New South Wales Department of Justice. Shortly before the Second World War, he was appointed a district court judge and served in this capacity until his retirement in 1955. He moved to England where he died in 1969 at the age of 78.

== Early life ==
Percy Storkey was born on 9 September 1893 (Note: Storkey gave 1891 as his year of birth when he enlisted in the Australian Imperial Force.) in Napier, New Zealand, to Samuel Storkey, an Englishman who worked as a printer and his New Zealand-born wife, Sarah née Dean. Samuel Storkey had moved to Napier as a young boy with his father William. Percy Storkey was educated at Napier Boys' High School, where he was dux of the school in his final year, and later Victoria College in Wellington, where he studied fine arts. As a teenager, Storkey served in the Territorial Force as an infantryman with the Wellington Regiment, eventually achieving the rank of colour sergeant after five years of service.

Around 1911 or 1912, Storkey moved to Sydney in Australia and worked as a clerk for a steamship company. Within a year he was on the administrative staff at the University of Sydney. He then enrolled in the university's law school but the First World War curtailed his studies.

== First World War ==
Storkey enlisted for service in the Australian Imperial Force (AIF) on 10 May 1915. Prior to his commissioning on 24 September as a second lieutenant, he served as a platoon sergeant in the 30th Battalion. He embarked for England aboard the Suevic at the end of the year but not before his former colleagues at the University of Sydney presented him with a wristwatch. and was posted to the 19th Battalion, then stationed on the Western Front in France, in mid-November 1916. He was wounded in the thigh during fighting at Flers, on the Somme, within days of joining the battalion. Promoted to lieutenant in January 1917, he was wounded again, in the ankle, in October 1917 during the Battle of Passchendaele while on the Menin Road. The following month, having returned to duty, he was given temporary command of a company.

On 21 March 1918, the Germans began their huge Spring Offensive and the 19th Battalion, as part of the 5th Brigade of the 2nd Division, helped in shoring up the front-lines as the Germans advanced. On 7 April 1918, while holding the lines near Villers-Bretonneux, his company, with Storkey as its second-in-command, was sent forward to clear Hangard Wood, believed to be lightly held by the enemy. The company commenced its advance early in the morning after a covering artillery barrage lifted, but Storkey had fallen asleep and was left behind at the starting line. He shortly woke and quickly caught up with the advance, about 70 metres (77 yd) ahead. By this time, machine gun fire had caused a quarter of the company to become casualties, including its commander, Captain Clarrie Wallach. Taking command, Storkey led a small party on a foray to outflank the machine gun post that was holding up the advance. Despite being detected as they approached, he seized the initiative and led a prompt charge that saw his party capture a machine gun along with 50 Germans and killing or wounding about 30 more. His conduct leading the attack had deceived the Germans into believing the size of the force facing them was much larger than it was.

The position secured, the Australians pushed on further into the wood but were unable to locate their objective. Storkey, considering the available options for cover too exposed, opted to withdraw the company back to their starting positions. On reporting to his battalion commander, he was ordered to retake the position but advised that he had too few men to so. His explanation was accepted and Storkey returned to his trench. Over 150 soldiers of the company had become casualties of the attack, but it had resulted in useful information on the German forces at Hangard Wood.

For his actions at Hangard Wood, he was awarded the Victoria Cross (VC). At the time, the VC, instituted in 1856, was the highest gallantry award that could be bestowed on a soldier of the British Empire. The citation for Storkey's VC, published in The London Gazette, read:

For most conspicuous bravery, leadership and devotion to duty when in charge of a platoon in attack. On emerging from the wood the enemy trench line was encountered and Lt. Storkey found himself with six men. While continuing his move forward a large enemy party—about 80 to 100 strong—armed with several machine guns was noticed to be holding up the advance of the troops on the right. Lt. Storkey immediately decided to attack this party from the flank and rear, and while moving forward in the attack was joined by Lt. Lipscomb and four men. Under the leadership of Lt. Storkey, this small party of two officers and ten other ranks charged the enemy position with fixed bayonets, driving the enemy out, killing and wounding about thirty, and capturing three officers and fifty men, also one machine gun. The splendid courage shown by this officer in quickly deciding his course of action, and his skilful method of attacking against such great odds, removed a dangerous obstacle to the advance of the troops on the right, and inspired the remainder of our small party with the utmost confidence when advancing to the objective line.

— The London Gazette, No. 30733, 4 June 1918.

Later wounded for a third time, Storkey was promoted to captain the following month and given command of his own company. On 25 July 1918, King George V presented him with his VC at Buckingham Palace. As part of a special furlough, he returned to Australia in November 1918 and was discharged from the AIF in January the following year by which time the war was over due to the armistice. He was allocated to the Reserve of Officers in July 1920.

== Later life ==
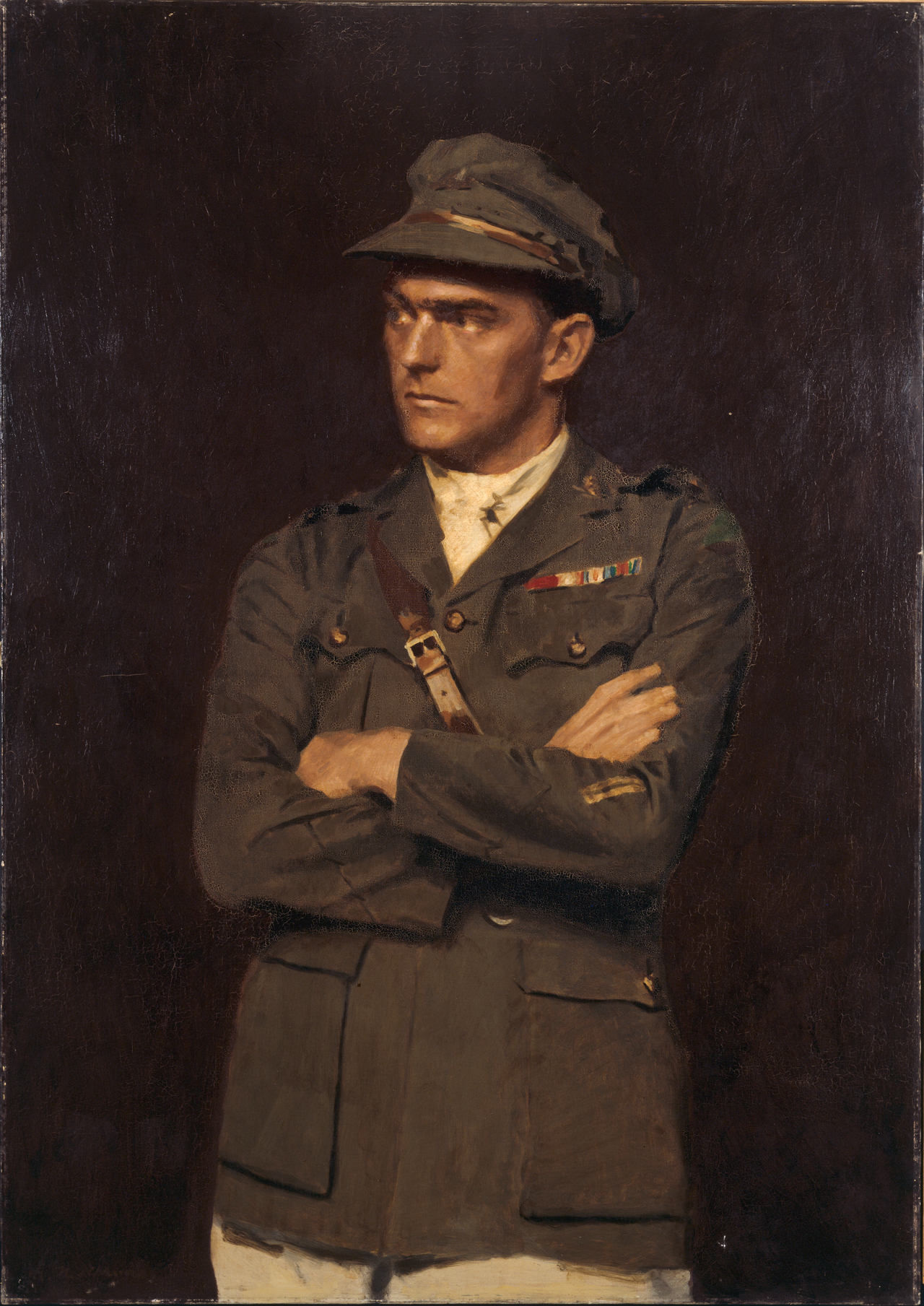
Oil portrait of Captain Percy Valentine Storkey, VC, AIF, painted by Duncan Max Meldrum around 1920

Returning to civilian life, Storkey resumed his legal studies. In May 1919 he was made an associate to Judge Langer Owen of the Supreme Court of New South Wales and then worked for Justice Charles Wade. He qualified as a lawyer in 1921 and briefly worked in private practice before becoming a crown prosecutor for the New South Wales Department of Justice; his jurisdiction covering the south-western area of the state. He fulfilled this role for several years until his appointment as a district court judge in May 1939, the first VC recipient to become a member of the bench. He presided over trials in the northern district of New South Wales. Prior to his appointment to the judiciary, he briefly worked for the legal department of the Australian Army. He was also involved in the Returned Soldier's League and became the president of the sub-branch in Vaucluse, the suburb of Sydney where he lived.

In 1955 Storkey retired and moved to England where he lived in Teddington, Middlesex, with Minnie née Burnett, his English-born wife, whom he had married in 1922 in Sydney. The next year, he attended the VC centenary celebrations in London. He died at home on 3 October 1969, survived by his wife. The couple had no children. He was cremated and his ashes scattered at South West Middlesex Crematorium. The machine gun captured during the action at Hangard Wood that saw him awarded the VC is displayed at the Australian War Memorial in Canberra, where a street is also named for him.

== Medal ==
Storkey left his VC, along with his Victory Medal, British War Medal, and medals from the 1937 and 1953 coronations, to his old school, Napier Boys' High School. In 1983 there was a controversy when the school Parents' League wanted to sell the VC to finance student scholarships but backed down in the face of public protests. Eventually the medals were transferred to the National Army Museum at Waiouru, where they are displayed on a long-term loan. A replica of his VC is also on display in the foyer of the assembly hall at Napier Boys' High School.
