= Fred Wood (rugby union) =

Australia international rugby union player (1884–1924)

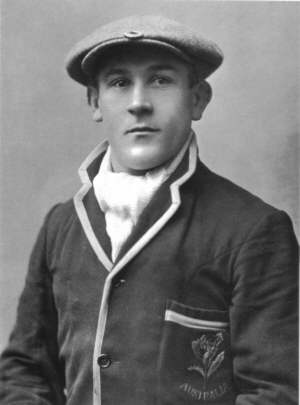
- Born: Frederick Wood; 21 January 1884 Staffordshire, England
- Died: 15 July 1924 (aged 40) Sydney
- Height: 5 ft 2 in (157 cm)
- Weight: 10 st 7 lb (67 kg; 147 lb)

Rugby union career
- Position: scrum-half
Senior career
Years	Team	Apps	(Points)
1903	Glebe RUFC	112	
Provincial / State sides
Years	Team	Apps	(Points)
1905–14	New South Wales	45	
International career
Years	Team	Apps	(Points)
1907–14	Wallabies	12	(3)

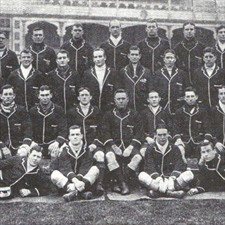
1909 Wallaby tour, Manager McMahon (2nd row centre) flanked by Moran(l) & Wood(r).

Frederick Wood (21 January 1884 – 15 July 1924) was an Australian rugby union player, a state and national representative half-back. He was vice-captain of the Wallabies on their first overseas tour in 1908–09 and later captained the side in Test matches in 1910 and 1914. His representative career lasted from 1905 to 1914.

== Early club and representative career ==
Wood played for the Glebe club in Sydney and first attracted attention when he represented in a 1905 Metropolitan (Sydney) side against the touring New Zealand side. He was then selected in the second match for New South Wales against those same All Blacks.

A full Australian team was selected the next day – the first national side to tour overseas and Wood was selected at half-back in the 1905 side captained by Stan Wickham which toured New Zealand. Wood played in four tour matches of the seven contested by the side, but did not figure in the sole Test.

In 1907, Wood was selected for New South Wales to meet the visiting All Blacks and played two matches alongside Chris McKivat in the halves with the first a narrow loss and the second a 14–0 victory to the Waratahs. Both McKivat and Wood were selected in the Australian test side captained by Peter Burge to meet those same All Blacks but the Wallabies were well-beaten 6–26. Woods held his spot for the 2nd Test (a loss to Australia) and the 3rd (a 5-all draw).

In 1908 an Anglo-Welsh side toured Australia and Wood was honoured with the state captaincy for New South Wales in the first of the two encounters he played against them.

== Wallaby tourist ==
Wood was selected as vice-captain on the first Wallaby 1908–09 Australia rugby union tour of Britain, the squad captained by Herbert Moran. Wood and Joshua Stevenson were the selected halfbacks but with Stevenson injured in the fifth tour game the selectors were forced to look at other halves combinations amongst Chris McKivatt, Arthur McCabe and Ward Prentice who were also in the squad. Wood was unavailable with injury for a run of five games and McKivatt seized the opportunity with both hands and played in both Tests at half-back and captained the side in the Olympic gold medal bout against Cornwall.

Moran later in Viewless Winds referred to the friction that arose since Wood as vice-captain was also a selector "The vice-captain was great little player who never found his form in England. It used to be unpleasant for us when, in the face of this, he insisted for a long time on his own selection. We did not want unfriendliness, but for nine [sic, in truth seven] matches in succession he kept McKivat out of his proper position"

However it was no disgrace to be playing second fiddle to McKivat and in any case following his recovery from injury Wood played another thirteen games, seven of them as captain and finished with a total tour tally of twenty appearances. When the Wallabies returned to Australia McKivatt and thirteen others of the squad moved to the ranks of the new professional code of rugby league and Wood resumed his place as the top half-back for New South Wales.

Wood played against the touring All Blacks of 1910 twice for New South Wales and in all three Test matches. That second test marked Australia's first ever victory over New Zealand in the seven encounters till then. Wood played against the New Zealand Māori rugby union team when they toured against New South Wales in 1910 and in 1913. That same year the Wallabies undertook a nine match tour of New Zealand with Wood playing in eight of those games. Wood played in all three Tests and Howell quotes the Chester McMillan reference (The Visitors) that in both the second and third Tests "Wood was the outstanding back on the field".

In 1914 aged 30 Wood was still representing for Australia when the All Blacks toured against and he was honoured with the captaincy of the national team in the first and third Tests. World War I marked the end of international rugby for a while as it also marked the end of Wood's long representative career having played 39 times for Australia including 12 Tests.

Fred Wood died aged 40 in 1924.

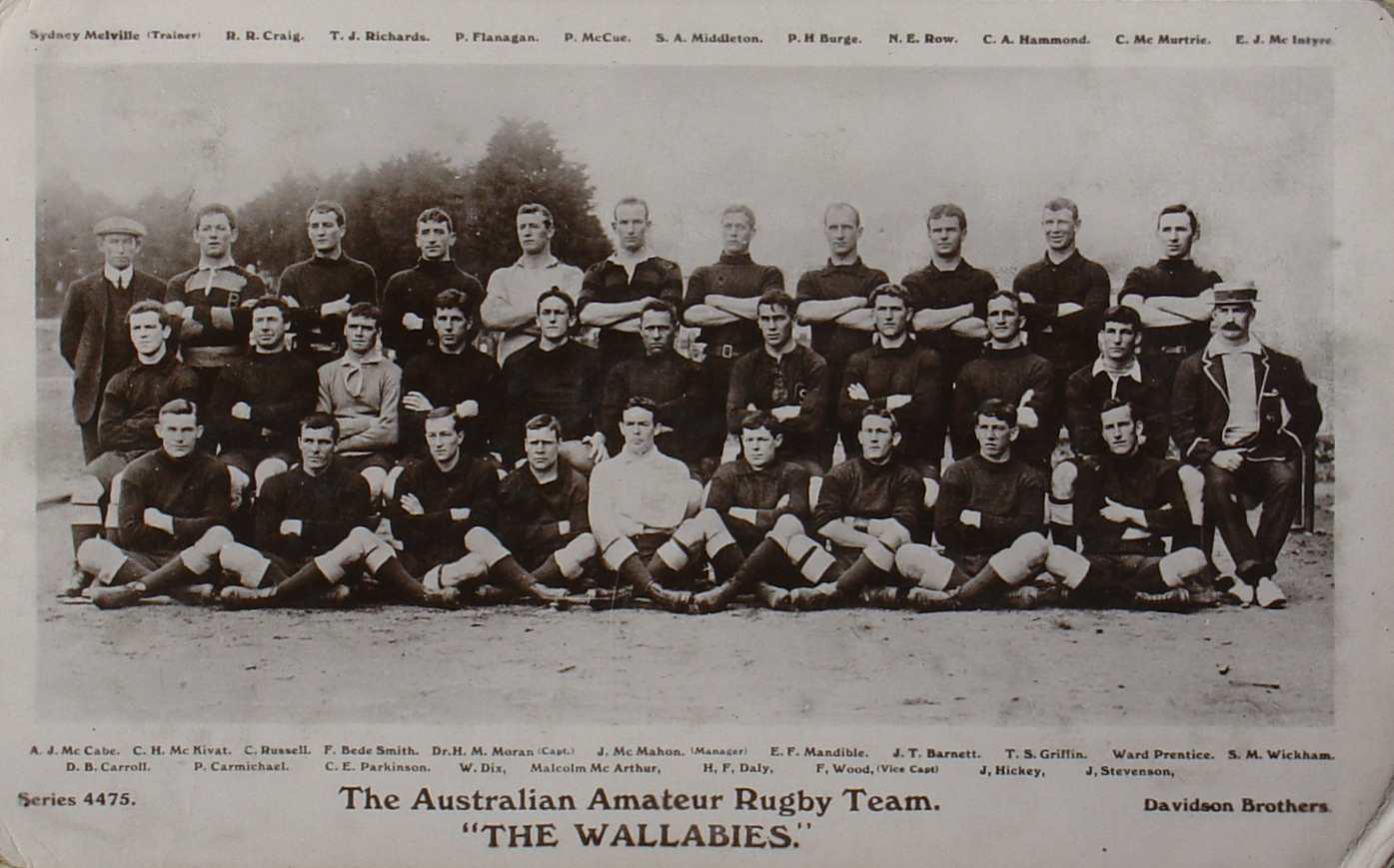
Wood front row 3rd from right, with the 1908 Wallaby tour squad

Preceded by Larry Dwyer	Australian national rugby union captain 1910–1914	Succeeded by Jimmy Flynn
