= William Murphy (rugby union) =

Australia international rugby union player (1880–1957)

- Born: William Murphy circa 1880
- Died: circa 1957

Rugby union career
- Position: number eight
International career
Years	Team	Apps	(Points)
1912	Wallabies	1	(0)

William Murphy (c. 1880–c. 1957) was a rugby union player who represented Australia.

Murphy, a number eight, claimed 1 international rugby cap for Australia. His brother Pat was also an Australian rugby union representative player.
