= Alfred Walker (rugby union) =

Australia international rugby union player

- Born: Arthur Stanley Billingsgate Walker circa 1893 Sydney
- Died: September 1958 Forster
- Height: 5 ft 6 in (168 cm)
- Weight: 11 st 6 lb
- School: Sydney Grammar School

Rugby union career
Senior career
Years	Team	Apps	(Points)
	Eastern Suburbs	77	
Provincial / State sides
Years	Team	Apps	(Points)
1912–24	New South Wales	32	
International career
Years	Team	Apps	(Points)
1912–1924	Wallabies	16	(9)

Arthur Stanley Billingsgate "Alfred" Walker (circa 1893 – September 1958) was an Australian rugby union player, a state and national representative scrum-half. His representative career lasted from 1912 to 1924 and he captained the national side on fifteen occasions including eleven Test matches between 1922 and 1924. Later he was a NSW state selector and representative team manager.

== Pre-war ==
Born in Sydney, Walker was schooled at Sydney Grammar and then joined the Eastern Suburbs club. At aged nineteen, before he had made any state representative appearances, he was selected for the 1912 Australia rugby union tour of Canada and the United States. He played in nine games of the tour, including the sole Test match against the United States which Australia won 12–8. He did not gain state or national selection in the few Tests and touring matches of the 1913 and 1914 Australian seasons.

He enlisted late in the 1st AIF late World War I joining the 1st Light Horse from the 4th General Service Reinforcement. He embarked for Egypt in HMAT A15 Port Sydney in August 1918 and returned to Melbourne in April 1919 with discharge in May 1919.

== Post-war career and captaincy ==
On his return to rugby in Sydney post-war Walker became club captain at Easts and was selected in New South Wales sides that met the All Blacks in Sydney in 1920. With no Queensland Rugby Union administration or competition in place from 1919 to 1929, the New South Wales Waratahs were the top Australian representative rugby union side of the period and a number of their fixtures of 1920s played against full international opposition were decreed by the Australian Rugby Union in 1986 as official Test matches. Thus Walker's fifteen Waratahs' appearances against international sides from 1920, including the eleven when he captained the side, were all later decreed as Tests. Walker took over the Waratahs captaincy from the first match against the visiting South Africans in 1921 at the Sydney Showground and led the side in all three Tests.

Walaker captained the Waratahs on their 1921 tour of New Zealand playing in eight games of the tour and the sole Test in Christchurch. Over the next three years Walker played for the Waratahs in nine further international matches against touring All Black and NZ Maori teams, captaining the side in seven of those matches.

All told Walker claimed a total of sixteen international rugby Test caps for Australia, eleven as captain. In retirement he became a state selector.

== Footnotes ==
Preceded by Willie Watson	Australian national rugby union captain 1922–24	Succeeded by Darby Loudon
