= Ted Fahey =

Australia international rugby union player

- Born: Edward Joseph Fahey; 7 July 1888 Sydney
- Died: 23 August 1950 (aged 62)
- School: St Joseph's College, Hunters Hill

Rugby union career
- Position: lock
Senior career
Years	Team	Apps	(Points)
1908–13 & 1919	Eastern Suburbs RUFC	73	
1914	Randwick	11	
Provincial / State sides
Years	Team	Apps	(Points)
1910–1919	New South Wales	39	
International career
Years	Team	Apps	(Points)
1912–1914	Wallabies	4	(0)

Edward Joseph Fahey (7 July 1888 – 23 August 1950) was an Australian rugby union player and World War I artilleryman. He was a state and national representative lock forward who made two international rugby tours and who captained the Wallabies on the 1913 Australia rugby union tour of New Zealand.

== School and club rugby ==
Fahey was born in Sydney and schooled at St Joseph's College, Hunters Hill. He captained their GPS premiership winning XV of 1907 and the Combined GPS schoolboy representative side that same year. After school he joined the Eastern Suburbs Rugby Club in Sydney. He would go on to become a stalwart for the club making 73 first-grade appearances over a twelve-year period interrupted by World War I. In 1914 redrawn catchment boundaries affecting the then applicable residential club eligibility criteria, forced Fahey to switch and play for the neighbouring Randwick Rugby Club. He captained Randwick in 1914 and made 11 first-grade appearances for that club.

After the war when the Australian domestic rugby season restarted, Fahey had the difficult task of captaining Eastern Suburbs Rugby Club in that rebirth season of 1919 when the game struggled to capture a public interest which had turned more to rugby league in the intervening years.

== Representative career ==
He made his representative debut for New South Wales in 1910 appearing in two fixtures against a touring All Blacks side and two matches against the New Zealand Maori. In 1911 he played in both interstate fixtures against the Queensland with the Waratahs prevailing in each.

Fahey's first opportunity to represent his country came in 1912 when he was selected in the 1912 Australia rugby union tour of Canada and the United States Fahey played in fifteen of the sixteen tour matches including the sole Test of the tour played against the US national side at Berkeley on 16 November 1912 and which the Wallabies won 12–8. The tour was a disappointment with the squad billeted out in college fraternity houses where the hospitality played havoc with team discipline and as result the team lost against two California University sides and three Canadian provincial sides. However Fahey returned with his reputation intact and became club captain for Easts in season 1913 and made further state appearances that year as well as touring with the Wallabies to New Zealand as vice-captain. He played in six of the nine tour matches and when tour captain Larry Dwyer was injured in the third match against Wanganui, Ted Fahey's opportunity came to captain his country. He captained the Wallabies in the first two Tests in September 1913 and in a tour match against Southland. He missed the 3rd Test through injury. He made further representative appearances in 1914 when the All Blacks toured Australia playing for a metropolitan Sydney side, for New South Wales and for Australia in the sole Test of a tour which interrupted by the outbreak of the Great War.

At the war's end in 1919 Fahey captained a New South Wales and an Australian side in matches against an AIF team. All told Fahey made 25 international appearances for Australia including four Test cap appearances, two as captain.

== War service ==
Fahey was aged 28 when together with his younger brother Walter he enlisted as a Gunner in 1916 with Field Artillery Brigade 7 of the AIF. They were posted to the same unit which left Sydney in May 1916 aboard HMAT Argyllshire, and served on the Western Front. Ted was demobilised at the War's end, returning to Sydney in December 1918. His brother also survived the war.

=== Honours and awards ===

- British War Medal
- Victory Medal

Preceded by Ward Prentice	Australian national rugby union captain 1913	Succeeded by Larry Dwyer
