= Jim Barrett (rugby union) =

New Zealand rugby player (1888–1971)

- Full name: James Barrett
- Born: 3 March 1888 Paeroa, New Zealand
- Died: 31 August 1971 (aged 83) Hamilton, New Zealand

Rugby union career
- Position: Loose forward
International career
Years	Team	Apps	(Points)
1913	New Zealand	2	(0)

James Barrett (3 March 1888 — 31 August 1971) was a New Zealand rugby union international.

Barrett, known as "Buster", was born in Paeroa, where he attended St Joseph's Catholic School. He moved to Auckland as a teenager to become an apprentice wheelwright and played his rugby for the city's Marist club.

A loose forward, Barrett was capped twice by the All Blacks in 1913, as a flanker for the 2nd and 3rd Tests against the touring Australians. He made one further All Blacks appearance, an uncapped match on the 1914 tour of Australia.

Barrett served with the Auckland Mounted Rifles Regiment in Egypt during World War I.

== See also ==
- List of New Zealand national rugby union players
