= Bob Adamson =

Australia international rugby union player (1889–1952)

- Born: Robert Wilson Adamson c. 1889
- Died: c. 1952

Rugby union career
- Position: wing
International career
Years	Team	Apps	(Points)
1912	Wallabies	1	(0)

Robert Wilson Adamson (c. 1889 – c. 1952) was a rugby union player who represented Australia.

Adamson, a wing, claimed one international rugby cap for Australia.
