= Hubert Jones (rugby union) =

Australia international rugby union player (1888–1916)

Herbert Jones
- Born: Herbert Jones; 8 August 1888 Newcastle
- Died: 4 November 1916 (aged 28) † Flers, France
- Height: 5 ft 7 in (170 cm)
- Weight: 147 lb (67 kg)
- School: Carrington Public School
- Occupation(s): Coal Trimmer and Labourer

Rugby union career
Provincial / State sides
Years	Team	Apps	(Points)
1911-1914	New South Wales	21	
International career
Years	Team	Apps	(Points)
1913	Wallabies	3	(9)

Herbert Jones (8 August 1888 – 4 November 1916) was a centre three quarter who played three internationals for Australia against New Zealand during the Australian tour to New Zealand in that year. He was also a member of the 23-man Wallabies squad to tour the United States of America in 1912, although he did not play in the internationals against the United States team. Herbert Jones also played a total of 21 matches for the New South Wales Rugby representative side between 1911 and 1914. He played his early rugby for Carrington and local sides in the Newcastle area.

He was born in Carrington, Newcastle in 1888 to William Morris Jones and his wife Mary Jones of Little Young Street (now Roger Street) Carrington. He was one of six children (3 boys and 3 girls) in the family. He worked as a coal trimmer and labourer as did his brothers, on the local docks of Carrington. Herbert Jones enlisted in the Australian Imperial Force (AIF) on 26 July 1915 at the age of 26 years and 11 months. He was posted to the 30th Battalion of the newly formed 5th Division and embarked on the troopship Beltana on 9 November 1915. Herbert Jones was killed in Action by shell fire on 4 November 1916, being the only member of the battalion killed that day. He is buried in the AIF Burial Ground at Flers, plot IX row B Grave 4. As he was unmarried, his mother Mary was granted a pension of one pound per fortnight.

During the 1980s, one of his surviving sisters donated Herbert's Australian and New South Wales touring caps to the Newcastle Regional Museum.

Jones, a centre, claimed a total of 3 international rugby caps for Australia.

== See also ==
- List of international rugby union players killed in action during the First World War
