= Alf Dunbar =

Australian rugby union player

Alfred Dunbar
- Born: Alfred Robert Dunbar; 18 June 1888 Glebe, New South Wales
- Died: c. 1954

Rugby union career
- Position: wing
International career
Years	Team	Apps	(Points)
1910–1912	Wallabies	4	(0)

Alfred Robert Dunbar (18 June 1888 – c. 1954) was a rugby union player who represented Australia.

Dunbar, a wing, was born in Glebe, New South Wales and claimed a total of 4 international rugby caps for Australia.
