= Lou Meibusch =

Australia international rugby union player (1893–1965)

- Born: Ludwig Samuel Meibusch; 26 March 1893 Toowoomba, Queensland
- Died: 1 December 1965 (aged 72)
- Notable relative: Jack Meibusch

Rugby union career
- Position: wing
International career
Years	Team	Apps	(Points)
1912	Wallabies	1	(3)

Ludwig Samuel "Lou" Meibusch (26 March 1893 – 1 December 1965) was a rugby union player who represented Australia.

Meibusch, a wing, was born in Toowoomba, Queensland and claimed one international rugby cap for Australia. His older brother Jack Meibusch also made a Wallaby appearance in 1904.
