= Harold Wesley George =

Australian rugby union player

Harold George
- Born: Harold Wesley George; December 1885
- Died: 10 May 1915 (aged 29–30) Mediterranean Sea
- Notable relative: Cpl Roy George

Rugby union career
- Position: prop
Senior career
Years	Team	Apps	(Points)
1912–14	Easts		
Provincial / State sides
Years	Team	Apps	(Points)
19??–14	New South Wales	20	
International career
Years	Team	Apps	(Points)
1910–14	Wallabies	8	(0)
- Military career
- Allegiance: Australia
- Branch: Australian Army
- Service years: 1915
- Units: 13th Battalion, Australian Expeditionary Force
- Conflicts: First World War; Gallipoli campaign; Landing at Anzac Cove (DOW)

Harold Wesley George (11 December 1885 – 10 May 1915) was an Australian representative rugby union prop forward who saw active service and was killed in World War I.

== Rugby career ==
George's club rugby career was with the Eastern Suburbs RUFC in Sydney where he played as a front-rower. He made twenty state representative appearances for New South Wales and appeared on eight occasions between 1910 and 1914 for Australia. He played in Australia's first win over the All Blacks in Sydney in 1910 and in the inaugural Test against the United States in Berkeley in California in 1912.

== Military career ==
On 21 January 1915, George enlisted as a private with the 13th (New South Wales) Infantry Battalion, Australian Imperial Force – the Battalion had been raised in September 1914 only six weeks after the declaration of war. The main strength of the battalion left Australia from Albany in December arriving in Egypt in February 1915. Harold George was enlisted to a force of reinforcements for the 13th and left Sydney on board HMAT A49 Seang Choon on 11 February 1915.

Along with the rest of the 4th Brigade, under the command of then Colonel John Monash, the 13th Battalion took part in the Landing at Anzac Cove, arriving late on 25 April 1915. Between May and August, they were then heavily involved in operations to establish and defend the narrow beachhead against Turkish assaults,

Harold George fought against the entrenched Turkish forces at Gallipoli in these actions where he was mortally wounded by sniper fire in May 1915 at Pope's Post. He died from wounds on 10 May 1915, aboard ship in the Mediterranean after evacuation from Gallipoli. He is commemorated on the Lone Pine Memorial (Turkey, Panel 37).

His clubmate Clarrie Wallach who also fought at Anzac Cove, wrote a letter home which was published in the sporting paper The Referee. He described hearing of George's death from William Tasker another rugby contemporary who saw Gallipoli action and later died on the Western Front."Twit Tasker told me how Harold George died the death of deaths — a hero's — never beaten till the whistle went".

== Honours and awards ==

Ribbon	Description	Notes
Ribbon for 1914–15 Star	1914–15 Star	
Ribbon for British War Medal	British War Medal	
Ribbon for Victory Medal	Victory Medal	

== See also ==
- List of international rugby union players killed in action during the First World War
- 1912 Australia rugby union tour of Canada and the United States
