= Tom Richards (rugby union, born 1882) =

Great Britain & Australia international rugby union player

Tom Richards MC
- T. J. Richards
- Born: Thomas James Richards; 29 April 1882 Emmaville, Colony of New South Wales
- Died: 25 September 1935 (aged 53) Brisbane, Queensland, Australia
- Height: 6 ft 0 in (1.83 m)
- Weight: 13 st (180 lb; 83 kg)

Rugby union career
- Position: Forward
Amateur team(s)
Years	Team	Apps	(Points)
1898	Charters Towers Waratahs		
1899–1905	Charters Towers Natives		
1906	Johannesburg Mines		
1906–1907	Bristol		
1909–1910	Charters Towers		
1911	Manly		
1913	Toulouse		
Provincial / State sides
Years	Team	Apps	(Points)
1905	Queensland		
1906	Transvaal		
1907	Gloucestershire		
1907	Queensland		
1909	North Queensland		
1911	Sydney Metropolitan		
1913	East Midlands		
International career
Years	Team	Apps	(Points)
1908–1912	Australia	3	(6)
1910	Great Britain	2	(0)
- Military career
- Allegiance: Australia
- Branch: Australian Imperial Force
- Service years: 1914–1919
- Rank: Lieutenant
- Units: 1st Field Ambulance; 1st Battalion
- Conflict: First World War; Gallipoli campaign; Western Front; Battle of Arras
- Awards: Military Cross
Medal record
Men's rugby union
Representing Australasia
Olympic Games
Gold medal – first place	1908 London	Team competition

Thomas James "Rusty" Richards MC (29 April 1882 – 25 September 1935) was an Australian military officer and national representative rugby union player, who was born at Vegetable Creek, Emmaville in New South Wales. Richards is the only Australian-born player to ever represent both Australia and the British Lions and as such the Tom Richards Trophy is named in his honor. He is an inductee to the Australian Rugby Union Hall of Fame.

== Early years ==
Richard's Cornish father emigrated to Australia during the Gold Rush from Cornwall in the United Kingdom. Nicknamed Rusty, he grew up as the fourth of six children in the gold mining town of Charters Towers in Northern Queensland, where he went to the local school and later working in the mines. His interest in the rugby game developed when a New South Wales touring side visited his town. He started training and playing rugby and went on to represent Queensland. His family moved to South Africa in 1905.

== Rugby wanderer ==
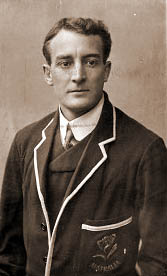
Richards on the 1908 Wallabies tour.

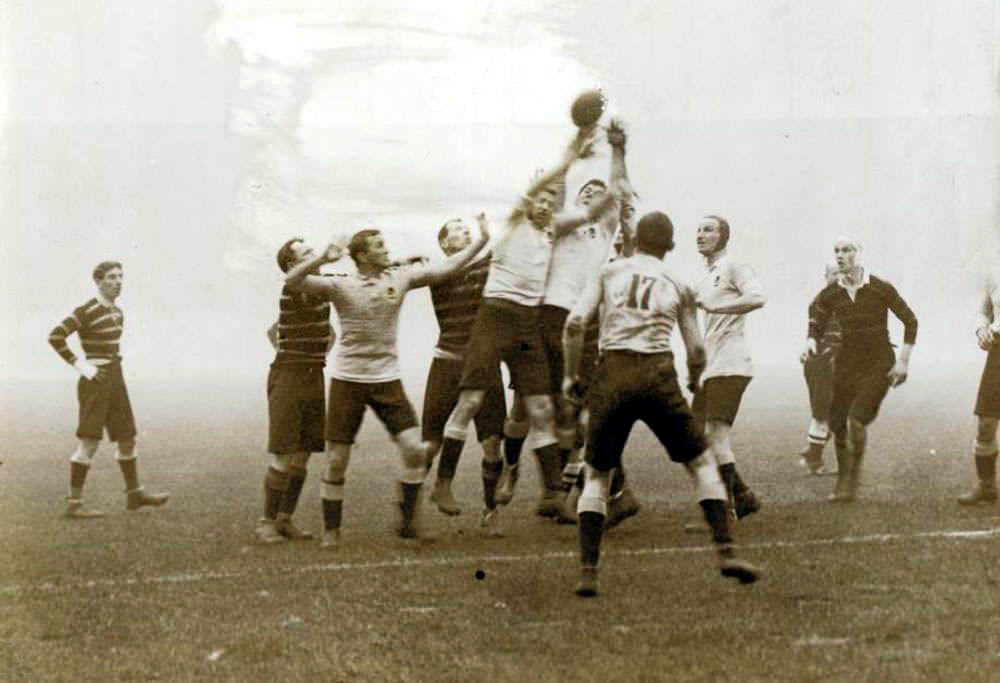
1908 Olympic Gold Final Wallabies v Cornwall.

He continued playing rugby in South Africa, playing a small number of games for the Transvaal in the domestic Currie Cup competition. That year the South Africa national rugby union team was preparing for its first overseas tour to Great Britain, and the Currie Cup was used as a trial to select the touring squad. Richards was initially considered as a squad member but a complicated qualifying rule prevented his inclusion. He subsequently travelled to England where he continued playing rugby in the county championships spending a season representing Bristol. Richards also played at county level while in Britain and was chosen to play for Gloucester in their encounter with the South Africa team he was excluded from touring with.

He soon returned to Australia and became the lynch-pin of the Queensland pack, which led to him being selected for the 'Wallabies' in the 1908 tour of the United Kingdom. On arrival in England to start the tour Richards was cajoled by team mate Bob Craig to help him smuggle his pet carpet snake through customs. Richards played in both test matches of the tour and was Australia's first try-scorer in the test against Wales. The touring party took part in the 1908 Summer Olympics that were being held in London. The team won gold, with Richards again scoring a try, over a Cornish side representing Great Britain. Richards thus became an Olympic Gold medallist.

He returned to South Africa after his touring duties. In 1910, the British Isles team were touring South Africa and in July of that year, played Transvaal. The tourist had picked up a number of injuries and Richards was drafted in to face his old team as he qualified to play through his membership with Bristol. He ended up representing Britain on twelve occasions, including two tests against South Africa. He scored once for Britain, a try in the second encounter with Transvaal. He returned to Australia in 1911 and was selected to tour to the United States and Canada with Australia in 1912. He played at break-away in the sole test of that tour - the November 1912 clash against the United States at Berkeley - and scored a try in that match. In 1913 his wanderlust returned, and he spent the year travelling around Europe, playing rugby in England, France, Italy and Switzerland. While in France he signed with Toulouse as a player and manager.

== War service and later life ==
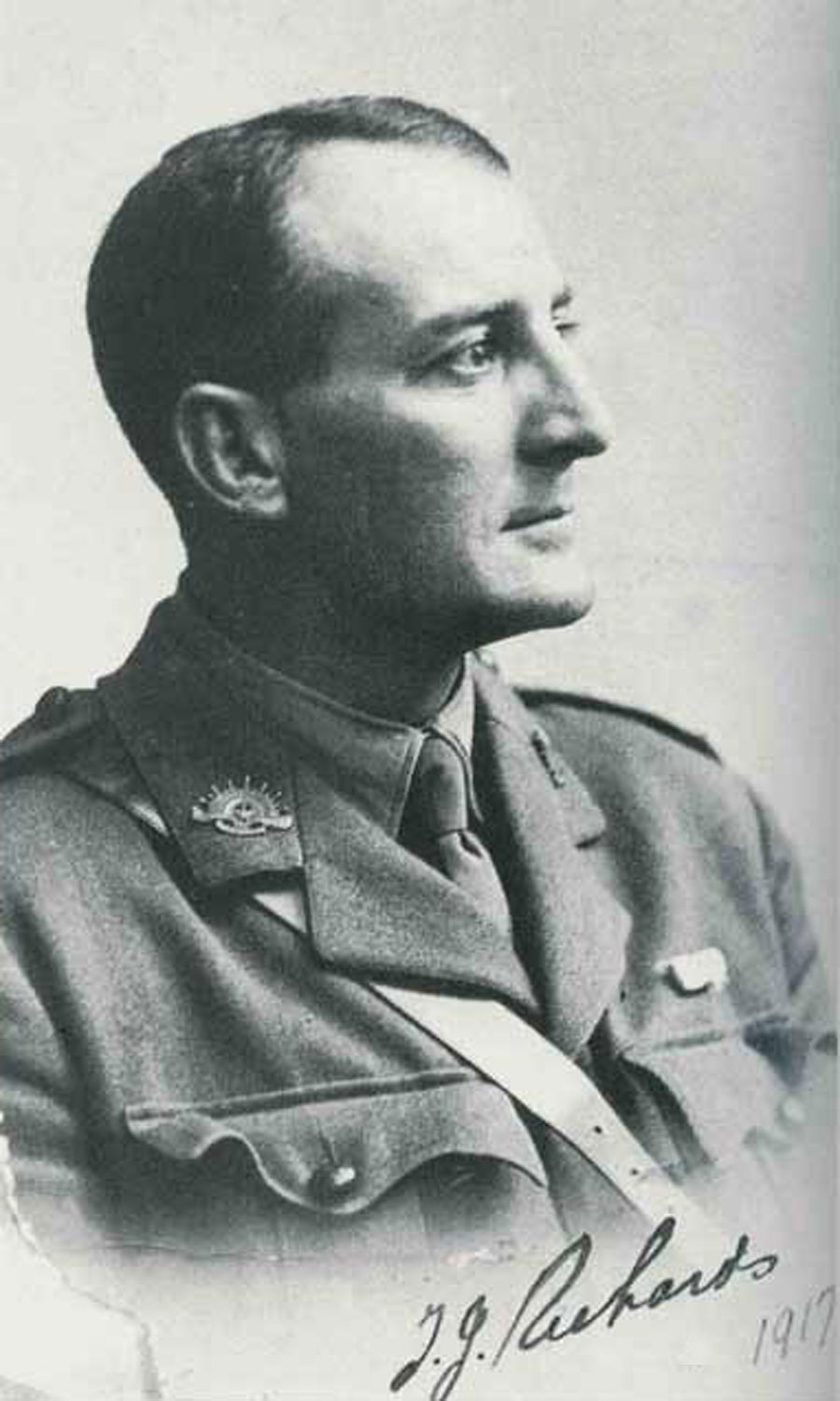

Richards enlisted in the Australian Imperial Force (AIF) on 26 August 1914 and in October sailed for Egypt on the Transport Euripides with the 1st Field Ambulance. He was part of the landing at Gallipoli on the morning of 25 April 1915 and served as a stretcher-bearer. In July 1915, he was mentioned in divisional orders for "acts of gallantry" in May and June 1915. With the conclusion of the Gallipoli Campaign in December 1915, he returned to Egypt and then in March 1916 left for the Western Front, when he was also appointed lance corporal. On 25 November 1916 he was commissioned second lieutenant and, in December, transferred to the 1st Infantry Battalion. In May 1917, during the Battle of Arras near Bullecourt, he led a nineteen-man bombing party. He was promoted lieutenant in June 1917 and awarded the Military Cross in August for "conspicuous gallantry and devotion to duty". In May 1917, he was accidentally injured in a bomb blast at the 1st ANZAC Training School. He was evacuated to England twice in 1917 and again in May 1918, with damage to his back and shoulders from a bomb blast. He left England in August 1918 and, after four months in South Africa en route, arrived in Sydney in February 1919 where his AIF appointment was terminated on 3 November.

== Legacy and accolades ==
The Tom Richards Cup is the trophy that is played for between the British & Irish Lions and Australia. In 2005 he was honoured as one of the inaugural five inductees into the Australian Rugby Union Hall of Fame. Upon his induction Australian Rugby Union President Paul McLean commented: "late Tom Richards was an extraordinary character whom The Times described in 1908 as the first man to be picked for Earth if we were ever to play Mars!"

== See also ==
- Rugby union at the 1908 Summer Olympics
- 1912 Australia rugby union tour of Canada and the United States
- Tom Richards Cup
