= New South Wales Country Rugby Union =

Governing body for the sport of rugby union

New South Wales Country
- Sport: Rugby Union
- Jurisdiction: New South Wales Regions, except Sydney & Southern NSW
- Membership: 10 unions (109 teams)
- Abbreviation: NSWCRU
- Founded: 1947 (78 years ago)
- Affiliation: New South Wales Rugby Union
- President: Barry Ruddy

Official website
- nswcountryrugby.com.au

The New South Wales Country Rugby Union, or NSWCRU, is the governing body for the sport of rugby union within most of New South Wales in Australia.

The NSWCRU is affiliated with the New South Wales Rugby Union and administers game in the majority of non-metropolitan areas of the state. The union is split into nine zones with 100 clubs and over 16,000 players. NSW Country is represented by the New South Wales Country Cockatoos team.

== Central Coast Rugby Union ==
=== First-grade clubs ===
- Avoca Beach
- Gosford
- Hornsby
- Kariong
- Razorbacks
- Terrigal
- The Lakes
- Warnervale
- Woy Woy

=== Lower-grade clubs ===
- The Bay

== Central North Rugby Union ==
=== First-grade clubs ===
- Gunnedah
- Inverell
- Moree
- Narrabri
- Pirates (Tamworth)
- Quirindi

=== Lower-grade clubs ===
- Barraba

== Central West Rugby Union ==
=== Blowes Clothing Cup teams (tier one) ===
Club	City	Home ground	No. of premierships	Premierships	Foundation Date
Bathurst Bulldogs	Bathurst	Ann Ashwood Park	12	1977, 1979, 1981, 1982, 1985, 1994, 1996, 1997, 1998, 2005, 2010, 2019	1874
Cowra Eagles	Cowra	Cowra Rugby Ground	1	2021	1967
Dubbo Kangaroos	Dubbo	Victoria Oval	7	1975*, 1987, 1995, 2006, 2007, 2008, 2014	1899
Forbes Platypi	Forbes	Grinstead Oval	2	2003, 2017	1968
Orange City	Orange	Pride Park	11	1976, 1984, 1986, 1988, 1989, 1990, 1991, 1992, 1993, 2012, 2013	
Orange Emus	Orange	Endeavour Oval	17	1958, 1961, 1962, 1971, 1972, 1973, 1975*, 1980, 1983, 1999, 2000, 2001, 2002, 2015, 2016, 2018, 2020	

=== New Holland Agriculture Cup teams (tier two) ===
Club	City	Home ground	No. of premierships	Premierships	Foundation Date
CSU-Mitchell	Bathurst	University Oval	1	2019	
Dubbo Rhinos	Dubbo	Victoria Oval	0	None	
Mudgee Wombats	Mudgee	Jubilee Oval	0	None	
Narromine Gorillas	Narromine	Cale Oval	2	2017, 2018	
Parkes Boars	Parkes	North Parkes Oval	2	2020, 2021	

=== Oilsplus Cup (tier-three north) ===
Club	City	Home ground
Blayney Rams	Blayney	Blayney Rugby Club
Canowindra Pythons	Canowindra	Canowindra Rugby Club
Coonabarabran Kookaburras	Coonabarabran	Coonabarabran Rugby Club
Geurie Goats	Geurie	Geurie Rugby Club
Molong Magpies	Molong	Molong Rugby Club
Wellington Redbacks	Wellington	Wellington Rugby Club
Yeoval Eagles	Yeoval	Yeoval Rugby Club

=== South West Fuels Cup (tier-three south) ===
Club	City	Home ground
Boorowa Goldies	Boorowa	Boorowa Rugby Club
Cootamundra Tri-Colours	Cootamundra	Cootamundra Rugby Club
Grenfell Panthers	Grenfell	Grenfell Rugby Club
Harden Red Devils	Harden	Harden Rugby Cub
Temora Tuskers	Temora	Temora Recreation Ground
West Wyalong Weevils	West Wyalong	West Wyalong Rugby Club
Young Yabbies	Young	Cranfield Oval

== Far North Coast Rugby Union ==
=== First-grade clubs ===
- Ballina Rugby Union Club
- Bangalow
- Byron Bay
- Casino
- Casuarina Beach
- Lennox Head
- Lismore
- Wollongbar/Alstonville

=== Lower grades/defunct clubs ===
- Evans River
- Iluka Cossacks
- Kyogle Cockies
- Mullumbimby
- Murwillumbah Gentlemen
- Richmond Range
- Woolgoolga Whitepointers
- Yamba Buccaneers

== Illawarra Rugby Union ==
=== First-grade clubs ===
- Avondale
- Bowral
- Camden Rams
- Campbelltown Harlequins
- Kiama
- Shoalhaven (Nowra)
- Tech Waratahs
- University of Wollongong
- Vikings
- Woonona Shamrocks RUFC

=== Lower-grade clubs ===
- Wollondilly White Waratahs
- Southern Crushers Rugby
- Vincentia

== Mid North Coast Rugby Union ==
=== Upper Mid North Coast zone clubs ===
- Coffs Harbour Snappers
- Southern Cross University Marlins
- Grafton Redmen RUFC
- Port Macquarie Pirates
- Hastings Valley Vikings
- Kempsey Cannonballs

=== Lower Mid North Coast zone clubs ===
- Forster/Tuncurry Dolphins
- Manning River Ratz
- Wallamba Bulls
- Old Bar Beach Clams
- Wauchope Thunder

== New England Rugby Union ==
=== First-grade clubs ===
- The Armidale Rugby Club (Blues)
- Barbarians R.U.F.C.
- Robb Rugby Club
- St Alberts College
- Tamworth Rugby Union Sporting Club

=== Lower-grade clubs ===
- Glen Innes
- Tenterfield Bumblebees

== Newcastle and Hunter Rugby Union ==
=== First-grade clubs ===
- Hamilton Hawks
- Merewether Carlton Rugby Club
- Maitland
- Nelson Bay
- University of Newcastle
- Singleton
- Southern Beaches
- Waratahs

=== Lower-grade clubs ===
- Griffins
- Lake Macquarie
- Muswellbrook
- Pokolbin
- Scone
- Wanderers

== South Coast Rugby Union & Southern Inland Rugby Union ==
These unions are affiliated with the ACT and Southern NSW Rugby Union instead of the NSWCRU.

== Western Plains Rugby Union ==
=== First-grade clubs ===
- Bourke-Brewarrina Barbarians
- Cobar Camels
- Coonamble Rams
- Gulargambone Galahs
- Bogan Bulls (Nyngan)
- Walgett Rams
- Warren Pumas

=== Former clubs ===
- Bourke Rams (merged with Brewarrina)
- Brewarrina Brumbies (amalgamated with Bourke)

== See also ==
- Rugby union in New South Wales
- New South Wales Waratahs
- New South Wales Country Cockatoos
- New South Wales Country Eagles
- Combined New South Wales–Queensland Country
