= Newcastle and Hunter Rugby Union =

Australian rugby union organisation

- Sport: Rugby Union
- Jurisdiction: Newcastle and Hunter Region
- Abbreviation: NHRU
- Founded: 1888 (as Northern Branch)
- Affiliation: New South Wales Rugby Union
- Regional affiliation: New South Wales Country Rugby Union

Official website
- www.nhru.com.au
- (New South Wales)

The Newcastle and Hunter Rugby Union is one of Australia's oldest rugby union organisations, with a history dating back to the mid 19th century. The union is based in Newcastle, New South Wales, Australia.

== History ==
The earliest report of a football match in Newcastle was in 1860, when 'a lover of the old English games has offered one of Mrs. O’Hagan's most fashionable bonnets as a prize to the fortunate party who shall give the winning (final) kick in a game of foot-ball, to be played on the new cricket ground, near St. John's Church'. On 5 June 1869, the Volunteer Artillery team (8 players) challenged United Cricket Club (11 Players) to a football match. The game was played over two weekends in Centennial Park (currently Lowlands Bowling Club).

The first recorded football club playing to the 'rugby rules' in the district was the Albion Football Club, established in 1872 in West Maitland. The region also saw new clubs Murrurundi FC (1874) and 'Singleton & Patrick's Plains FC' (1876). On 1 May 1877, a meeting at 'Ship Inn' saw the foundation of Newcastle Football Club. 1877 also saw the formation of the Wallsend Club.

A precursor to the formation of a local union, the Raysmith Challenge Cup was commenced in 1887 and was contested by Newcastle, Waratah, Advance, Orientals, Union, Ferndale, West Maitland, Raymond Terrace, East Maitland Imperial, Singleton and East Maitland clubs. In 1888, a meeting of Newcastle, Advance, West Maitland, Union and Ferndale Clubs saw a branch of the Southern Rugby Football (later NSWRU in 1892) established, this was known as the Northern Branch. This was the formation of what would become the Newcastle Rugby Union. Early clubs in the competition included Advance (1880); West Maitland (1885); Oriental (1885); Union (1885); Ferndale (1885); Waratah (1885); Raymond Terrace (1886); Carlton (1887); Centennial (1887); Lambton (1888); Wickham Albion (1888) and Greta (1890).

In 1899 the Northern Branch replaced the existing clubs with a new districts scheme based on residential rules, which in first grade was Newcastle Central, Newcastle Easts, Newcastle Norths and West Maitland. The first Australian national team (now Wallabies) in 1899 against the British Lions included Hunter-born Charlie Ellis and Charlie White.Later in the same series Walter Cobb who was playing with the Newcastle Centrals club was also selected, making him the region's first Australian representative player.

In 1911, the Northern Branch disbanded but was reformed in 1912 to be known as the Newcastle Rugby Union. During 1915–1924, little rugby union was played due to World War I and its aftermath. After a match between Great Public Schools Old Boys and Newcastle High School Old Boys at Empire Park in 1924, a decision was made to reform the Newcastle Rugby Union; this was beginning of the current Premier Rugby Competition. The 1925 competition comprised Cook's Hill Old Boys, Newcastle High School Old Boys, Great Public Schools' Old Boys (later re-named Wanderers), Lysaght's Limited, Northern Suburbs and Mayfield.

Discontent with the focus of district rugby (introduced in 1899) saw the establishment of the Hunter District Rugby Union in 1900. The initial competition comprised the East End, West End, Morpeth, Millers Forest, Branxton and Singleton clubs. Seniors competition continued until 1916, when suspended due to a shortage of players as a result of the War. But the HDRU continued to foster rugby football through the Cadets Competition. In 1996, the Hunter Valley Zone amalgamated with Newcastle to form the current Newcastle and Hunter Rugby Union.

== List of clubs ==
Clubs and competitions in the 2026 Hunter Rugby season.

=== Premier Rugby clubs ===
- Hamilton Hawks
- Merewether Carlton Rugby Club
- Maitland
- University of Newcastle
- Southern Beaches
- Wanderers

Suburban A Grade clubs

- Nelson Bay
- Scone
- Singleton
- Muswellbrook
- Cooks Hill

Suburban B Grade clubs

- Medowie
- Pokolbin
- Scone
- Singleton
- East Mayfield

Women’s XV clubs

- Hamilton Hawks
- Merewether Carlton Rugby Club
- Maitland
- University of Newcastle
- Southern Beaches
- Wanderers
- Scone
- Singleton
- Cooks Hill

Friday ‘Social’ 4s clubs

- Hamilton Hawks
- Merewether Carlton Rugby Club
- Maitland ‘Black’
- Maitland ‘White’
- University of Newcastle
- Wanderers
- Newcastle Griffins ‘Red’
- Newcastle Griffins ‘Green’
- Cooks Hill

== Hunter Rugby Structure ==
Newcastle and Hunter Rugby Union (NHRU) as of the 2026 season features 5 senior competitions. Premier (Men's), Women's XV, Suburban A, Suburban B and Friday (Social) 4s. Each of these competitions feature different clubs and requirements.

=== Premier (Men's) ===
NHRUs Premier competition has a three grade requirement. As of the 2026 season there are 6 clubs that compete in the Premier competition, all fielding 1st, 2nd and 3rd Grade sides. These clubs are:

- Maitland Blacks
- Wanderers
- University of Newcastle Seahorses
- Hamilton Hawks
- Southern Beaches
- Merewether Carlton

Former clubs in Premier:

- Singleton Bulls - now playing in Suburban (last premier season 2022)
- Nelson Bay Gropers - now playing in Suburban (last premier season 2022)
- Lake Macquarie Roos - now playing in Central Coast zone (last premier season 2022)
- The Waratahs

=== Women's XV ===
The Women's XV has seen various clubs over the years, with 2026 seeing Singleton field their first senior women's side within recent times. The current 8 clubs are:

- Maitland Blacks
- Wanderers
- University of Newcastle Seahorses
- Hamilton Hawks
- Merewether Carlton
- Cooks Hill Brown Snakes
- Scone Brumbies
- Singleton Bulls

Former clubs in Women's XV:

- Nelson Bay Gropers (last season 2025)
- Southern Beaches (last season 2024)
- The Waratahs (last season 2023)
- Medowie (last season 2023 as a Baa Baas side with Southern Beaches)

=== Suburban (formerly Divisional) ===
The Suburban competition has undergone changes within the last few years. Hunter Rugby has recently split the competition into an A and B Grade. This has occurred so clubs could field multiple grades, and not have them in the same competition. While also allowing other clubs a goal they can grow towards. Having an A and B Grade also allows clubs a friendlier entry point back into the senior competition, with B Grade now being an option. This has already seen benefits, with East Mayfield resurrecting in 2026 after years of no senior sides. They now compete in B Grade (as of 2026).

==== A Grade ====
A Grade in 2026 currently has 5 clubs:

- Cooks Hill Brown Snakes
- Singleton Bulls
- Scone Brumbies
- Muswellbrook Heelers
- Nelson Bay Gropers

==== B Grade ====
B Grade in 2026 currently has 5 clubs:

- Singleton Bulls
- Scone Brumbies
- Pokolbin Reds
- Medowie and Districts Marauders
- East Mayfield

Former clubs in Suburban/Divisional:

- Newcastle Griffins - now field two sides in Friday 4s (last season 2025)
- Singleton Army (last season 2023)
- Lake Macquarie Roos - moved to Central Coast Zone (last season 2023)
- University of Newcastle Seahorses (last season 2023)
- The Waratahs (last season 2021)
- Cessnock Mungrels - informally merged with Pokolbin (last season 2021)
- Southern Lakes (last season 2019)
- Merewether Carlton (last season 2019)

=== Friday Night (Social) 4s ===
Friday Night 'Social' 4s is a Friday night competition that plays 50 minute games with unlimited interchanges. Each club treats it in a different way, and it often sees an extensive amount of change between seasons (regarding what clubs enter). It is a melting pot of abilities and ages. It's used as a social grade, for those who cannot commit to weekend games, an entry point for new players to premier clubs trying to work up the grades etc. In 2026 there are 7 clubs fielding 9 sides in Friday Night 4s:

- Maitland
- Maitland 'Black'
- Newcastle Griffins 'Red'
- Newcastle Griffins 'Green'
- University of Newcastle Seahorses
- Hamilton Hawks
- Merewether Carlton
- Wanderers
- Cooks Hill Brown Snakes

== Current club details ==
The Newcastle and Hunter Rugby Union now consists of 20 clubs across 3 Divisions plus a women's competition. There is a junior competition (Hunter Junior Rugby Union) accommodating age groups 7 through to 18.

- Easts
  - Nickname: Easts
  - Colours: Gold, White and Navy
  - Home Ground: Dangar Park, Mayfield (the spiritual home of rugby in Newcastle)
  - Joined competition: 1946
  - Premierships:1954, 1987, 1990 (tied), 2000, 2004 (5)
- Hamilton
  - Nickname: Hawks
  - Colours: Blue and Gold
  - Home Ground: Passmore Oval, Wickham
  - Joined competition: 1968
  - Premierships:1978, 1982, 1990 (tied), 2002, 2008, 2010, 2012, 2015, 2016, 2017, 2018, 2019 (12)
- Lake Macquarie
  - (formerly known as Boolaroo)
  - Nickname: Roos (formally Bulls)
  - Colours: Yellow, Maroon and Dark Blue
  - Home Ground: Walters Park, Boolaroo
  - Joined competition:
  - Premierships: 0
  - now compete in the Central Coast competition
- Maitland
  - Nickname: Blacks
  - Colours: Black, with white trim
  - Home Ground: Marcellin Park, Lorn
  - Joined competition:
  - Premierships: 1969, 1974(tied), 1976, 1977, 1983, 1991, 1994, 1998, 1999, 2023, 2025 (11)
- Merewether Carlton
  - Nickname: Greens
  - Colours: Dark green and white
  - Home Ground: Townson Oval, Merewether
  - Joined competition:
  - Premierships: 1947, 1958, 1973, 1974 (tied), 1979 (tied), 1980, 1989, 2007, 2011, 2022, 2024 (11)
- Nelson Bay
  - Nickname: Gropers
  - Colours: Blue, Black and White
  - Home Ground: Strong Oval, Nelson Bay
  - Joined competition:
  - Premierships: 0
  - now compete in the Subuurban Rugby competition
- Singleton
  - Nickname: Bulls
  - Colours: Red and Black
  - Home Ground: Rugby Park, Howe St Singleton.
  - Joined competition: 1990
  - Premierships:1992, 1995, 1996, 1997 (4)
  - now compete in the Suburban Rugby competition
- Southern Beaches
  - Nickname: Beaches
  - Colours: Blue and Yellow
  - Home Ground: Alan Davis Field, Gateshead
  - Joined competition: 2007
  - Premierships: 0
- University
  - Nickname: Students
  - Colours: Maroon and White
  - Home Ground: University Oval No 1.
  - Joined competition: 1957 in first grade (1955 in the lower grades)
  - Premierships: 1959, 1961, 1962, 1966, 1984, 1985, 1986, 1988, 2026 (9)
- Wanderers
  - Nickname: Two Blues
  - Colours: Sky blue and Royal blue
  - Home Ground: No. 2 Sports ground, Newcastle West
  - Joined competition:
  - Premierships: 1945, 1949, 1955, 1956, 1960, 1963, 1964, 1965, 1975, 1981, 1993, 2001, 2005, 2009, 2014 (15)
- The Waratahs
  - Nickname: Waratah
  - Colours: Red, with white trim
  - Home Ground: Waratah Oval
  - Joined competition: 1944
  - Premierships:1946, 1950, 1951, 1952, 1953, 1957, 1967, 1968, 1970, 1971, 1972, 1979 (tied), 2003, 2006, 2013 (15)

Clubs competing in the lower Premier and Suburban competitions include:

- Cessnock Coalfields
- Cooks Hill Brown Snakes
- Newcastle Griffins
- Medowie Marauders

- Muswellbrook Heelers
- Pokolbin Reds
- Singleton Army Lions

== Premiers ==
First grade premiers (1945 onwards):

| Year | Premiers |
|---|---|
| 2026 | University |
| 2025 | Maitland |
| 2024 | Merewether Carlton |
| 2023 | Maitland |
| 2022 | Merewether Carlton |
| 2019 | Hamilton |
| 2018 | Hamilton |
| 2017 | Hamilton |
| 2016 | Hamilton |
| 2015 | Hamilton |
| 2014 | Wanderers |
| 2013 | The Waratahs |
| 2012 | Hamilton |
| 2011 | Merewether Carlton |
| 2010 | Hamilton |
| 2009 | Wanderers |
| 2008 | Hamilton |
| 2007 | Merewether Carlton |
| 2006 | The Waratahs |
| 2005 | Wanderers |
| 2004 | Easts |
| 2003 | The Waratahs |
| 2002 | Hamilton |
| 2001 | Wanderers |
| 2000 | Easts |
| 1999 | Maitland |
| 1998 | Maitland |
| 1997 | Singleton |
| 1996 | Singleton |
| 1995 | Singleton |

| Year | Premiers |
|---|---|
| 1994 | Maitland |
| 1993 | Wanderers |
| 1992 | Singleton |
| 1991 | Maitland |
| 1990* | Easts & Hamilton |
| 1989 | Merewether Carlton |
| 1988 | University |
| 1987 | Easts |
| 1986 | University |
| 1985 | University |
| 1984 | University |
| 1983 | Maitland |
| 1982 | Hamilton |
| 1981 | Wanderers |
| 1980 | Merewether Carlton |
| 1979* | Merewether Carlton & Waratahs |
| 1978 | Hamilton |
| 1977 | Maitland |
| 1976 | Maitland |
| 1975 | Wanderers |
| 1974* | Merewether Carlton & Maitland |
| 1973 | Merewether Carlton |
| 1972 | Waratahs |
| 1971 | Waratahs |
| 1970 | Waratahs |

| Year | Premiers |
|---|---|
| 1969 | Maitland |
| 1968 | Waratahs |
| 1967 | Waratahs |
| 1966 | University |
| 1965 | Wanderers |
| 1964 | Wanderers |
| 1963 | Wanderers |
| 1962 | University |
| 1961 | University |
| 1960 | Wanderers |
| 1959 | University |
| 1958 | Merewether Carlton |
| 1957 | Waratahs |
| 1956 | Wanderers |
| 1955 | Wanderers |
| 1954 | Easts |
| 1953 | Waratahs |
| 1952 | Waratahs |
| 1951 | Waratahs |
| 1950 | Waratahs |
| 1949 | Wanderers |
| 1948 | Technical College |
| 1947 | Merewether Carlton |
| 1946 | Waratahs |
| 1945 | Wanderers |

Notes: *Tie for Premiership

== Grand Final Results (from 2000–present) ==
| Year | Minor Premiers | Final result | | | Final details |
| Year | Minor Premiers | Winner | Score | Runner-up | Venue |
| 2000 | Wanderers | Eastern Districts | 23–22 | Wanderers | St John Oval, Charlestown |
| 2001 | Wanderers | Wanderers | 20–3 | Eastern Districts | The Gardens, Birmingham Gardens |
| 2002 | Hamilton | Hamilton | 23–8 | Wanderers | The Gardens, Birmingham Gardens |
| 2003 | Wanderers | Waratah | 21–15 | University | The Gardens, Birmingham Gardens |
| 2004 | Eastern Districts | Eastern Districts | 22–20 | Wanderers | The Gardens, Birmingham Gardens |
| 2005 | Waratah | Wanderers | 10–3 | Waratah | Passmore Oval, Hamilton |
| 2006 | Waratah | Waratah | 22–10 | University | Passmore Oval, Hamilton |
| 2007 | Merewether Carlton | Merewether Carlton | 24–23 | Hamilton | #1 Sportsground, Newcastle |
| 2008 | Hamilton | Hamilton | 35–20 | University | #1 Sportsground, Newcastle |
| 2009 | Wanderers | Wanderers | 21–20 | Merewether Carlton | #1 Sportsground, Newcastle |
| 2010 | Merewether Carlton | Hamilton | 39–34 | Maitland | #1 Sportsground, Newcastle |
| 2011 | Merewether Carlton | Merewether Carlton | 20–16 | Hamilton | #1 Sportsground, Newcastle |
| 2012 | Hamilton | Hamilton | 46–0 | Merewether Carlton | #2 Sportsground, Newcastle |
| 2013 | Hamilton | Waratah | 17–15 | Hamilton | #2 Sportsground, Newcastle |
| 2014 | Wanderers | Wanderers | 20–17 | Southern Beaches | #2 Sportsground, Newcastle |
| 2015 | Hamilton | Hamilton | 14–7 | Wanderers | #2 Sportsground, Newcastle |
| 2016 | Hamilton | Hamilton | 37–28 | Wanderers | #2 Sportsground, Newcastle |
| 2017 | Hamilton | Hamilton | 45–12 | Wanderers | #2 Sportsground, Newcastle |
| 2018 | Hamilton | Hamilton | 20–12 | Maitland | #2 Sportsground, Newcastle |
| 2019 | Hamilton | Hamilton | 36–7 | Wanderers | #2 Sportsground, Newcastle |
| 2022 | Merewether Carlton | Merewether Carlton | 19-7 | Hamilton | #2 Sportsground, Newcastle |
| 2023 | Maitland | Maitland | 32-26 | Merewether Carlton | #2 Sportsground, Newcastle |
| 2024 | Maitland | Merewether Carlton | 41-25 | Maitland | #2 Sportsground, Newcastle |
| 2025 | Maitland | Maitland | 25-17 | Merewether Carlton | #2 Sportsground, Newcastle |
| 2026 | Merewether Carlton | University | 22-17 | Merewether Carlton | #2 Sportsground, Newcastle |

== Recent Premier 1 Rugby Finals Series ==
=== 2026 season ===
| Final | Team | Pts | Team | Pts |
|---|---|---|---|---|
| Minor Semi | Maitland | 20 | Wanderers | 22 |
| Major Semi | Merewether Carlton | 15 | University | 29 |
| Preliminary | Merewether Carlton | 50 | Wanderers | 29 |
| Grand | University | 22 | Merewether Carlton | 17 |

=== 2025 season ===
| Final | Team | Pts | Team | Pts |
|---|---|---|---|---|
| Minor Semi | Hamilton | 41 | Wanderers | 5 |
| Major Semi | Maitland | 23 | Merewether Carlton | 29 |
| Preliminary | Maitland | 42 | Hamilton | 19 |
| Grand | Merewether Carlton | 17 | Maitland | 25 |

=== 2024 season ===
| Final | Team | Pts | Team | Pts |
|---|---|---|---|---|
| Minor Semi | Hamilton | 31 | Wanderers | 17 |
| Major Semi | Maitland | 23 | Merewether Carlton | 32 |
| Preliminary | Maitland | 34 | Hamilton | 29 |
| Grand | Merewether Carlton | 41 | Maitland | 25 |

=== 2023 season ===
| Final | Team | Pts | Team | Pts |
|---|---|---|---|---|
| Minor Semi | University | 28 | Wanderers | 29 |
| Major Semi | Maitland | 22 | Merewether Carlton | 23 |
| Preliminary | Maitland | 38 | Wanderers | 37 |
| Grand | Merewether Carlton | 26 | Maitland | 32 |

=== 2022 season ===
| Final | Team | Pts | Team | Pts |
|---|---|---|---|---|
| Minor Semi | Wanderers | 22 | Maitland | 17 |
| Major Semi | Merewether Carlton | 28 | Hamilton | 26 |
| Preliminary | Hamilton | 59 | Wanderers | 24 |
| Grand | Merewether Carlton | 19 | Hamilton | 7 |

=== 2019 season ===
| Final | Team | Pts | Team | Pts |
|---|---|---|---|---|
| Elimination | Merewether Carlton | 27 | Lake Macquarie | 27 |
| Qualifying | Wanderers | 35 | Maitland | 19 |
| Minor Semi | Maitland | 25 | Merewether Carlton | 17 |
| Major Semi | Hamilton | 34 | Wanderers | 19 |
| Preliminary | Wanderers | 50 | Maitland | 28 |
| Grand | Hamilton | 36 | Wanderers | 7 |

=== 2018 season ===
| Final | Team | Pts | Team | Pts |
|---|---|---|---|---|
| Elimination | Nelson Bay | 22 | Wanderers | 22 |
| Qualifying | Maitland | 29 | Merewether Carlton | 31 |
| Minor Semi | Maitland | 23 | Nelson Bay | 15 |
| Major Semi | Hamilton | 36 | Merewether Carlton | 28 |
| Preliminary | Merewether Carlton | 24 | Maitland | 26 |
| Grand | Hamilton | 20 | Maitland | 12 |

=== 2017 season ===
| Final | Team | Pts | Team | Pts |
|---|---|---|---|---|
| Elimination | Maitland | 44 | Merewether Carlton | 20 |
| Qualifying | Wanderers | 19 | Southern Beaches | 20 |
| Minor Semi | Wanderers | 59 | Maitland | 5 |
| Major Semi | Hamilton | 27 | Southern Beaches | 10 |
| Preliminary | Southern Beaches | 20 | Wanderers | 34 |
| Grand | Hamilton | 45 | Wanderers | 12 |

=== 2016 Finals ===
| Final | Team | Pts | Team | Pts |
|---|---|---|---|---|
| Elimination | Merewether Carlton | 25 | The Waratahs | 26 |
| Qualifying | Wanderers | 18 | Southern Beaches | 43 |
| Minor Semi | Wanderers | 41 | The Waratahs | 33 |
| Major Semi | Hamilton | 39 | Southern Beaches | 17 |
| Preliminary | Southern Beaches | 17 | Wanderers | 43 |
| Grand | Hamilton | 37 | Wanderers | 28 |

=== 2015 Finals ===
| Final | Team | Pts | Team | Pts |
|---|---|---|---|---|
| Elimination | Merewether Carlton | 27 | University | 6 |
| Qualifying | Wanderers | 22 | The Waratahs | 19 |
| Minor Semi | The Waratahs | 34 | Merewether Carlton | 28 |
| Major Semi | Hamilton | 24 | Wanderers | 28 |
| Preliminary | Hamilton | 47 | The Waratahs | 9 |
| Grand | Wanderers | 7 | Hamilton | 14 |

=== 2014 Finals ===
| Final | Team | Pts | Team | Pts |
|---|---|---|---|---|
| Elimination | The Waratahs | 27 | Merewether Carlton | 28 |
| Qualifying | Hamilton | 25 | Southern Beaches | 50 |
| Minor Semi | Hamilton | 22 | Merewether Carlton | 24 |
| Major Semi | Wanderers | 21 | Southern Beaches | 24 |
| Preliminary | Wanderers | 37 | Merewether Carlton | 15 |
| Grand | Southern Beaches | 17 | Wanderers | 20 |

=== 2013 Finals ===
| Final | Team | Pts | Team | Pts |
|---|---|---|---|---|
| Elimination | Wanderers | 26 | Maitland | 12 |
| Qualifying | The Waratahs | 22 | Merewether Carlton | 20 |
| Minor Semi | Merewether Carlton | 30 | Wanderers | 32 |
| Major Semi | Hamilton | 15 | The Waratahs | 27 |
| Preliminary | Hamilton | 43 | Wanderers | 8 |
| Grand | The Waratahs | 17 | Hamilton | 15 |

=== 2012 Finals ===
| Final | Team | Pts | Team | Pts |
|---|---|---|---|---|
| Elimination | Maitland | 16 | Lake Macquarie | 23 |
| Qualifying | Southern Beaches | 17 | Merewether Carlton | 25 |
| Minor Semi | Southern Beaches | 10 | Lake Macquarie | 20 |
| Major Semi | Hamilton | 25 | Merewether Carlton | 5 |
| Preliminary | Merewether Carlton | 46 | Lake Macquarie | 8 |
| Grand | Hamilton | 46 | Merewether Carlton | 0 |

== Test representatives ==
The following players have played a Rugby Union Test for Australia. The first player from the Newcastle region to represent Australia was C.J.B. White from the Maitland Club in 1899.

- Neil Adams (Noodles) (1925–1986) Merewether Carlton – 1 test
- Cyril Burke (1925–) Merewether Carlton / The Waratahs – 26 Tests
- Walter Cobb (1870–1933) Centennial – 2 Tests
- Dick Cocks (1945 -) Brisbane Waters – 10 Tests
- Terry Curley (1938–2017) Wanderers – 11 Tests
- Declan Curran (1952 -) The Waratahs – 4 Tests
- Michael Fitzgerald (1955 -) The Waratahs
- William Gardner (1929 -) Newcastle – 1 Test
- Ronald Harvey (1933 -) The Waratahs – 2 Tests
- Phil Hawthorne (1943–1994) Wanderers – 21 Tests
- John Hipwell (1948–2013) The Waratahs – 35 Tests
- Peter Horton (1945 -) The Waratahs – 21 Tests
- Michael Jenkinson (1940 -) Wanderers
- Hubert Jones (1888–1919) North Newcastle – 3 Tests
- Alexander MacNeill (1947 -) Newcastle Referees Assoc – 16 Tests
- Sydney Malcolm (1903 -) South Newcastle – 12 Tests
- John Marshall (1926 -) The Waratahs – 1 Test
- Ronald Meadows (Twinkletoes) Wanderers – 6 Tests
- Steve Merrick (1968 -) Singleton – 2 Tests
- Dr. Herbert Moran (Paddy) (1885–1945) Newcastle – 1 Test
- Joshua Stevenson (1883 – ?) South Newcastle
- Josh Valentine (1983 -) Singleton - 6 Tests
- Dominic Vaughan (1960 -) The Waratahs – 5 Tests
- Patrick Walsh (1879–1953) Carlton – 3 Tests
- Keith Walsham (1941 -) University – 2 Tests
- Charlie White (1874–1941) Maitland – 3 Tests

== See also ==
- Rugby union in New South Wales
- List of Australian club rugby union competitions

== Sources ==
- Newcastle and Hunter Rugby Union website
- Mulford, John (2005). Guardians of the Game: "The History of the New South Wales Rugby Union 1874–2004. Sydney. ISBN 0-7333-1625-5.
