= New England Rugby Union =

Australian rugby union governing body

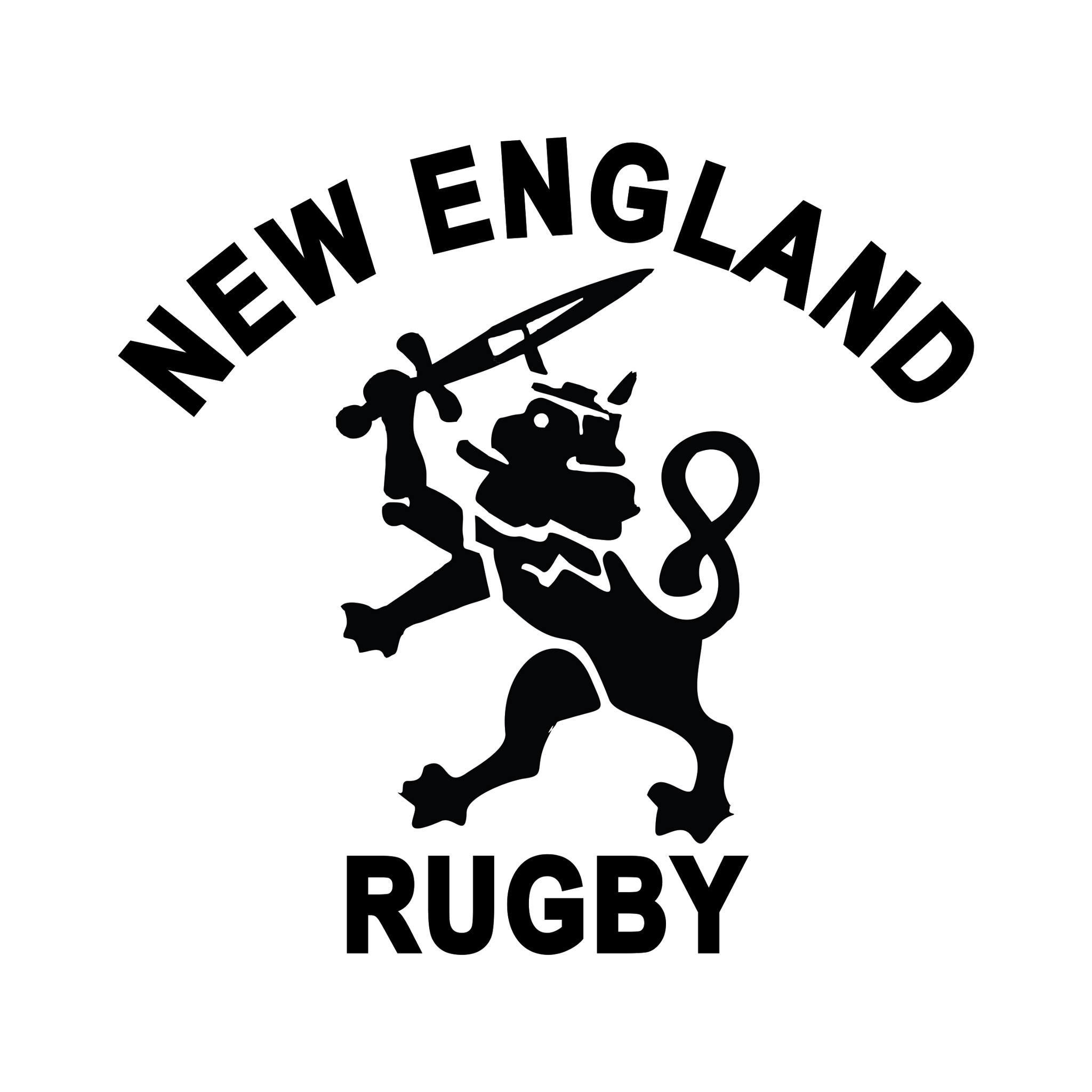
- Sport: Rugby Union
- Jurisdiction: New England (New South Wales), Australia
- Abbreviation: NERU
- Affiliation: New South Wales Rugby Union
- Headquarters: New South Wales, Australia
- President: David Clifton

Official website
- www.neru.com.au
- (New South Wales)

The New England Rugby Union, or NERU, is the governing body for the sport of rugby union within the District of New England (New South Wales) in Australia. It is a member of the New South Wales Country Rugby Union.

It supports three men's competitions and a women's 10s competition.

== History - 1880 to 1900 ==
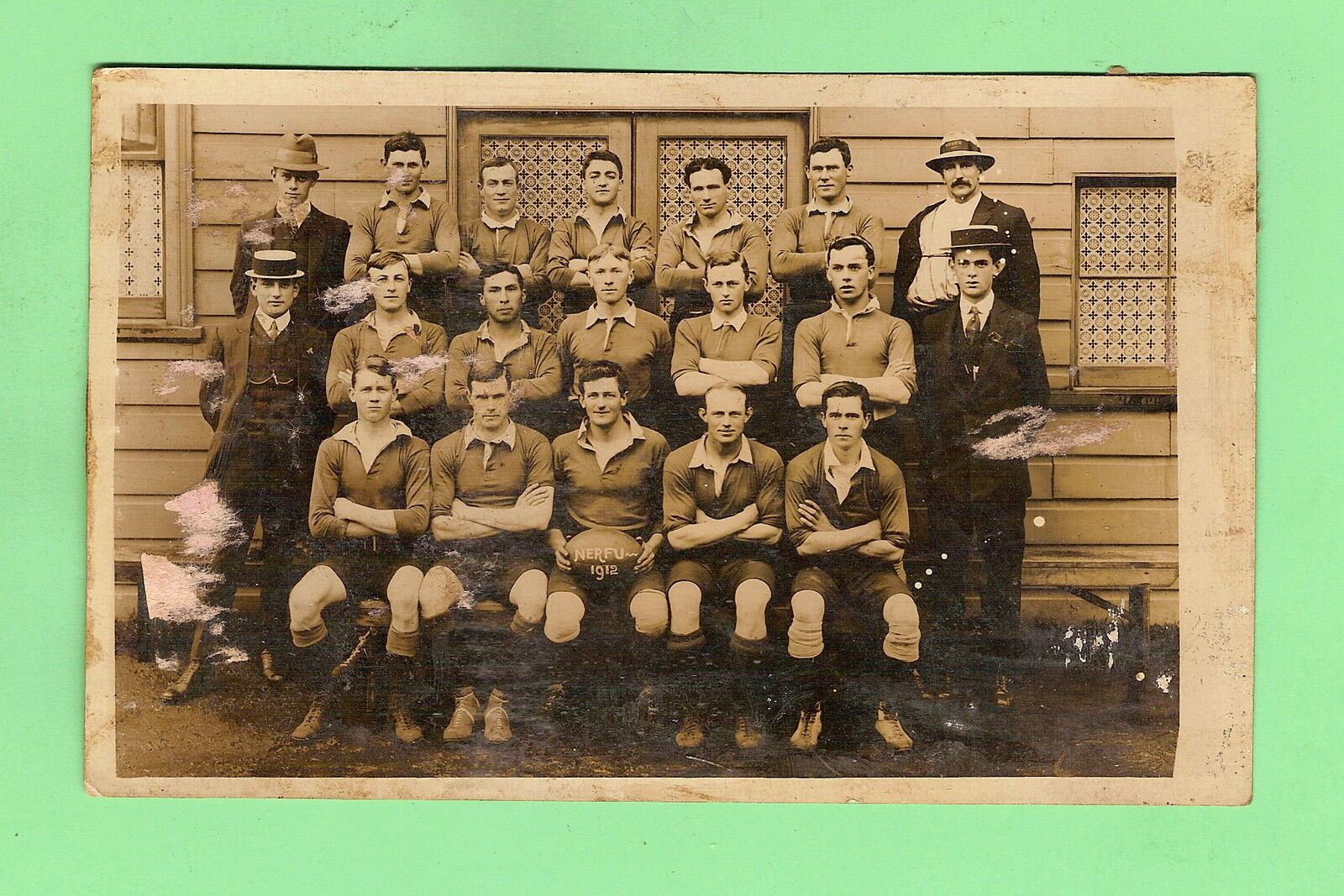
NERFU 1912

The nearest clubs were located in the Newcastle district, so matches were organised on an ad-hoc basis. The Main North Railway was extended to West Tamworth in 1878 and Armidale in 1883. Its construction no doubt aided the development of the rugby code simply because teams could travel with speed and comfort. Inter district competition assisted with the promotion of the game as did the promotion of a shorter working week so workers could enjoy recreational activities. Saturday afternoons became available for sports and, for our region as for others, the rugby code took hold as a result.

On 12 May 1880, the Armidale Football Club was formed to play games rugby rules An article in the Armidale Express refers to a meeting to form the New England Rugby Union at the St Kilda Hotel on 4 March 1893. However, an unaffiliated competition had commenced the previous year with the Armidale, Albion, Deepwater, West End, Armidale Holiday Association, Inverell, Glen Innes and West Hillgrove clubs. Another club was later formed at Hillgrove.

The NERU's listed member clubs in 1894 were Uralla, Armidale, Gunnedah, Hillgrove, Quirindi, Tamworth and Walcha. The games were haphazard and by arrangement. The seniors cup competition of 1895 included Hillgrove and Armidale-based clubs Albion, Arforma and Armidale whilst the Tamworth-based teams were Acme, Tamworth and Royal Standard. The latter was no doubt associated with the Royal Standard Brewery which was located at the end of Jewry Street in Peel Street. A juniors competition also existed.

There was success in the 1890s. The year 1894 saw the Acme Rugby Club of Tamworth lose to the Albion Club of Armidale 12 points to nil whilst the Tamworth Rugby Club lost to the Federals Rugby Club of Armidale 14–7 in the 1899 final and West Tamworth defeated Albions 8–0 in 1900 for the New England Rugby Football Union Trophy. The NERFU Cup was donated by the late Mr. Thomas Danshey in 1892.

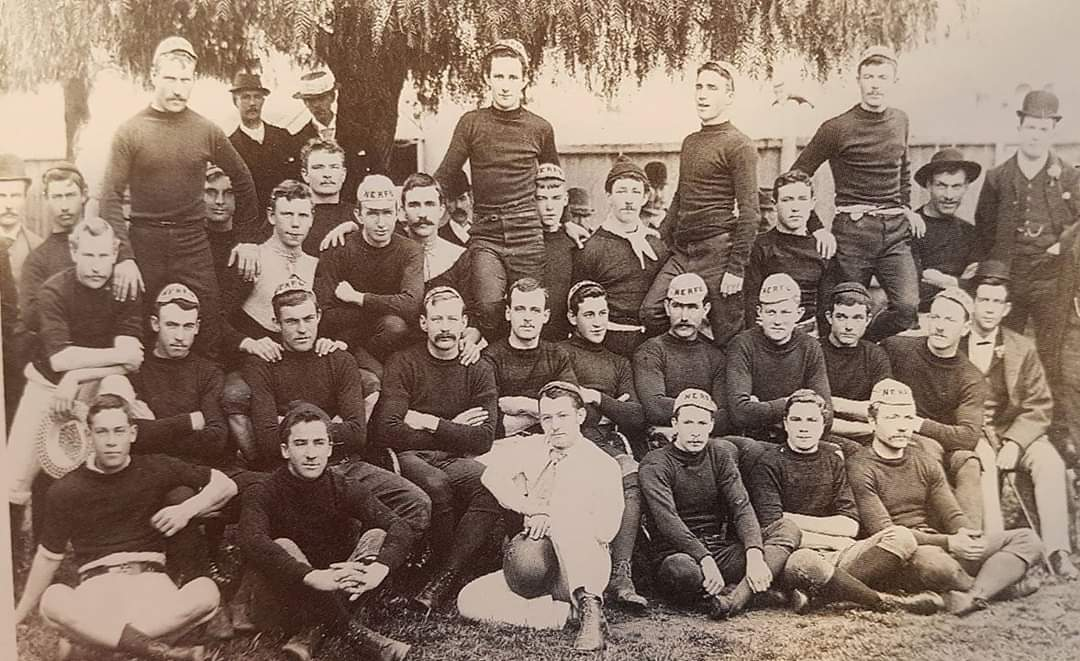
NERFU team

Representative football saw a 1893 New England team led by George Bliss lose to the NSW state team at the Sydney Cricket Ground 6–5. The state team only winning near the end of the game with a late try.

== 1901 - 1919 & The Sawers Shield ==
The mood to move away from the NERU by some of the clubs in the southern part of the Union is expressed in an article from 1900 where the Tamworth Football Club, at its annual meeting, passed the following resolution:

"That the secretary communicate with the Tamworth West, Werris Creek and Manilla Football Clubs as to the advisability of not joining the New England Rugby Football Union unless it was guaranteed that the final match be played in Tamworth."

It was felt that the local clubs had supported the NERU for a number of years, but that a final match had never been played in Tamworth. Central North (Tamworth) was subsequently formed and applied to affiliate with the NSW Rugby Union in 1903.

The Central Northern Rugby Union Cup was won by the North Tamworth club in 1903, 1904 and 1905. It was presented by CM Oliphant Esq to the club's captain W Jones. The 1904 Central North competition was composed of the North Tamworth, East Tamworth, West Tamworth, Manilla, “our Boys” (Moonbi) and Quirindi clubs.

The Sawers Shield was donated by William Sawers MHR for the best team in Central North and New England Rugby Unions. Sawers was one of the few non-Armidale residents to hold a position on the NERFU committee. He was president of the Tamworth Rugby Club in 1896 and a vice-president of the NERFU. He was the inaugural member of the new New England electorate in the first Federal parliament.

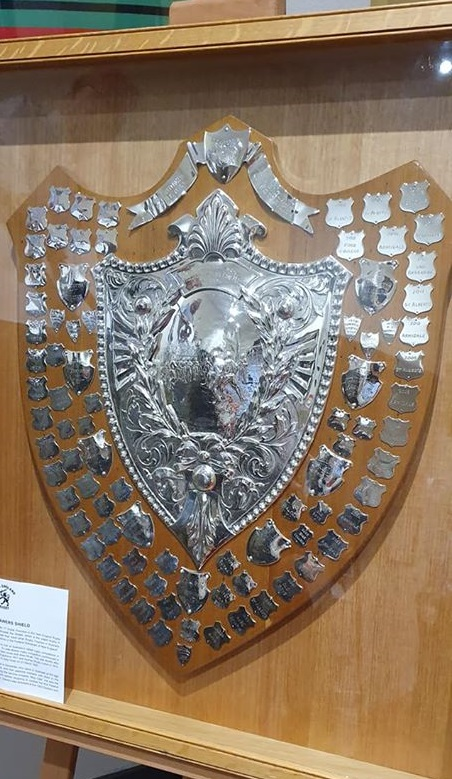
Sawers Shield

Between 1902 and 1914, the winner from both competitions would play-off for the right to hold the shield.

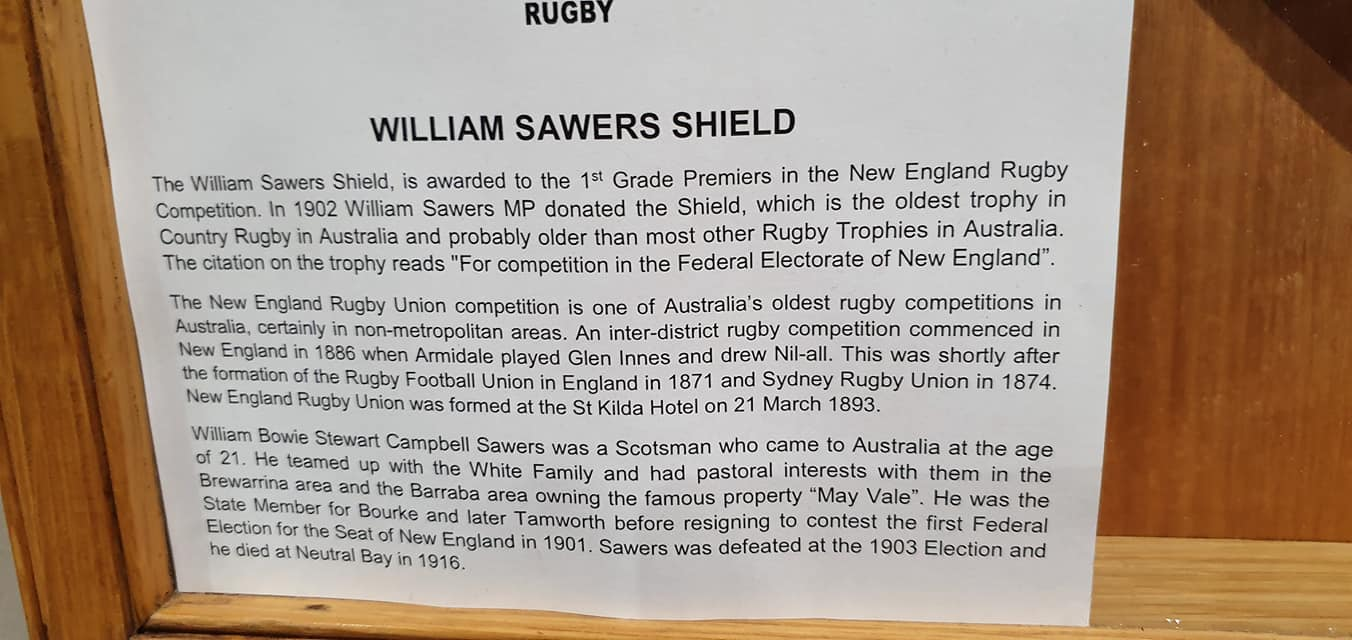

The East Tamworth club won both the Observer Cup in the Central North competition and the Sawers Shield by winning against South Armidale.

In 1913, in spite of the smallpox epidemic, which was then raging, the New Zealand Maoris played the Northern Districts team at Tamworth winning 29–8. All players had to have smallpox vaccinations prior to playing.

Prior to the outbreak of World War 1, two New South Wales country matches were played by the visiting All Blacks, the last for six long years as the New South Wales Rugby Union decided to discontinue all senior games for the duration and to give maximum support to the war effort. In contrast, the professional game continued to be played at all levels.

The advent of World War 1 saw many rugby union competitions dissolve for patriotic reasons and lack of numbers. An Inverell Times report of 24 April 1915 stated that the Northwest Rugby Football Union took the view that anyone who was able to train for football should enlist and resolved to abandon all competition games. Numbers were lost to the war effort or to the rival league code.

== The 1920s to 1940s ==
Sawers Shield was not contested from 1915 until 1948, when its status changed from an inter-district one to being for the winner of the New England seniors competition.

The 1914-18 war years were hard on the rugby code. An example of the effect the league movement was having on rugby is the AGM notice for the New England Football Union of 1919 where consideration would be made as to whether the union should cease its activities in favour of the league game. The NERU rallied, and with Walcha changing zones, Armidale continued to play rugby whilst many other district centres made the switch. 1921 saw Manilla club convert to league. Thus, all of the Tamworth district had converted.

It was a different story at the top of the Great Divide. Despite efforts, Walcha refused to budge and stuck with the rugby code. In addition, the GPS schools wished to maintain the ethos of amateur sport. As such, The Armidale School's membership of the GPS system prevented the adoption of the professional code. These factors assisted with the survival of the rugby code in the New England where elsewhere saw its disappearance.

The Armidale Express of the 1920s and 1930s mentions teams such as Armidale Teachers College, New England University College, Armidale FC, GPS Old Boys, Bundarra, Uralla and The Armidale School (TAS). TAS, Armidale High and De la Salle College provided schoolboy games. In 1924, the NERU saw rugby being played by The Armidale School (TAS), St Johns College and Veterans FC with combined Armidale playing against Walcha.

In 1925, the teams were Tingha, Bundarra, GPS Old Boys, TAS1 & TAS2

The 1930s saw the Armidale City Club reformed with the Bruxner Cup the main competition in New England.

=== The Bruxner Cup ===
A report about the 31st annual meeting of the New England Rugby Union in 1925 mentioned the donation of a cup by Colonel Michael Bruxner in 1925.

A number of articles un the Armidale Express of 1929 refers to a number of meetings where the issue of Union v League was discussed. At a meeting between the organisers of the two rugby codes, a view was aired that Armidale did not have the population to sustain both and that one should be adopted. It was suggested that as rugby union was the code played in the schools, then rugby union should be the code adopted by the senior teams. Moreover, it is a game played in far more centres across the world compared to the north of England and parts of Australia and New Zealand. Lastly, that league was dominated by Tamworth so Armidale would not gain any advantage in being a league centre. The contrary argument was that Armidale was isolated from other rugby playing centres and there was not a town or village in NSW or Qld that did not have a leagues club. It was suggested the league game was better for the player and for the spectator and that public opinion was in favour of the code. Needless to say, no agreement was reached.

The New Zealand All Blacks played against a combined New England/North West team in 1929 with the All Black team winning 27–8. Walcha's Bill Laycock captained the side.

The NSW team stayed in Armidale after a tour of Queensland. The last time this occurred was some 16 or 17 years earlier.

==== The Great Depression ====
It seems there was a hiatus in the rugby union code from the early 1930s caused by the severe economic depression. Clubs folded due to players struggling to find work. Yet there were games and the schools continued to play. For example, Armidale, TAS and Teachers College played in 1932.

1935 saw an Armidale team play Inverell in a game won by Armidale 20–15. It may have been a scratch game. Another was an invitation game also in 1935 between Teachers College and the Merewether-Carlton Club from Newcastle. The game was won by the College 19–10. The Newcastle team had won the Newcastle premiership but struggled with the overnight car travel.

In June 1938. a meeting to revive rugby in Armidale saw a new committee formed under Mr E Yule a former vice president of the Newcastle Rugby.

It wasn't until 1939 that the competition got full underway The Armidale Club held a reformation meeting in April 1939. The newly formed University College joined the competition and played against the De La Salle high school team. Other teams included Teachers College, TAS and Armidale.

Another hiatus occurred until 1943 when GA Fisher, headmaster of The Armidale School, became president of the reconstituted union. Teams in 1943 competition were restricted to the university, Teachers College and secondary schools. Mr Fisher remained president of the NERU for seven years and was instrumental in the revitalisation of rugby in the New England region.

As the demands of World War 2 drew to a close, 1945 saw visiting teams from Sydney University, St Andrews College, Newcastle and Randwick and playing games against Armidale representative teams.

=== Post WW2 ===
The 1946 competition included Armidale City, Teachers College and the university in A Grade. These clubs also fielded teams in the B Grade competition along with TAS, South Kentucky, Armidale High and De La Salle School.

In 1949, the First Grade competition competed for the Sawyers Shield whilst the Second Grade teams competed for the Bruxner Cup

== The 1950s ==
The Walcha club reformed in 1950 after a 20-year hiatus when Doug Laurie placed a notice in the Walcha News of a meeting on 28 January at the Literary Institute to consider “...the formation of a Rugby Union Football Club”. The Walcha club contained multiple zone and Country representatives such as Don Lisle. Don had played for the New England, NSW Country and NSW teams in 1950. Another Walcha player Peter Fenwicke went one better and went on to play for Australia in 1957.

Also formed in 1950 was the Young Christian Workers (YCW) Club.

The Inverell Club was reformed in 1951 with a trial game against Teachers College losing to the students 19–12.

The reformed Tamworth Rugby club made an application to enter a team in the 1952 competition. The inaugural game was against the Armidale City Rugby Club on 5 April 1952. The 1952 competition included Armidale City, university, Teachers College (two teams), Walcha and Inverell. 1953 saw Tamworth fully included in the New England competition along with Armidale City, Walcha, Guyra, Inverell, Teachers College and University.

An Inverell Times article in 1954 intimated that up to 19 teams would nominate to play in the New England. The annual meeting of the NERU listed representatives from Armidale, Walcha, Tamworth, Rockdale, Guyra, YCW, Teachers College and the NERU.

The interest in rugby was enhanced by representative games held at Tamworth's No 1 oval. In June 1954, a crowd of 6,500 watched the touring Fijian side defeat the New England team 37–14. The New England team played well but was outclassed by the tourists. Tamworth hosted the British Lions in a game against NSW Country on 9 June 1959. The touring team won 27-14 but Country had four players who wore the Wallaby colours; Peter Fenwicke (Walcha), Bill Gunther (Molong) and Jim Lenehan and Beres Ellwood (both from Wagga Wagga). Other representative games were held against the Springboks, the NZ Services side and later the New Zealand All Blacks.

In 1956 the NERFU accepted new nominations for first and second grade from Quirindi, Gunnedah and Kootingal-Bendemeer. These additions meant that distances travelled by the southern zone teams became a problem. The compromise solution saw the New England zone split into northern and southern zones in 1957 with each zone playing two rounds of matches before uniting in a third round to decide the competition. The southern zone teams included Tamworth, Walcha, Quirindi, Gunnedah and Kootingal-Bendemeer.

The revived Central North zone evolved from the old Southern Zone in 1958 under the approval of the NSWRU. A meeting had been held in Tamworth in November 1955 to discuss the formation of a new Southern Zone competition in New England. A further meeting was called by the Tamworth club in November 1956 to discuss football arrangements for 1957. Many clubs were upset by the stop-start nature of the NERFU competition when University and Armidale Teachers College holiday breaks meant players were not available to field teams.

Teams in the Tamworth-based competition had played in the southern zone of the NEFRU for several years. In early 1958, the Walcha, Tamworth, Gunnedah and Quirindi clubs applied to the NSW Rugby Union for recognition as the Central Northern Union. Despite some opposition the application was granted. Walcha and Tamworth moved over to the new Central North Zone.

== 1960 to 1980 ==
Content required.

== 1980 to 2000 ==
Content required.

== 2000 to 2020 ==
Tamworth returned the NERU after a 59-year absence in 2018 with Walcha returning briefly in 2020 and permanently in 2024. The COVID-19 pandemic erupted in 2020 causing many competitions in all sports to close. A decision was made to work with the restrictions and continue to play a shortened competition. The Central North and Mid North Coast rugby competitions shut down causing the Walcha club and a combined clubs from Coffs Harbour known as the Coffs Knights to join the New England competition. These two clubs faced each other in the grand final with Walcha taking out the trophy.

== Premiers ==
The NERFU championship teams from 1892 to 1901 were:

- 1892 Armidale d Albion (Armidale)
- 1893 Armidale d Tenterfield 3–0
- 1894 Albions (Armidale) d Acme (Tamworth) 12–0
- 1895 Gunnedah d Armidale 12–6
- 1896 Gunnedah d Arforma (Armidale) on forfeit
- 1897 Albions (Armidale) d Gunnedah 9–0
- 1898 Gunnedah d Federals (Armidale) 16–8
- 1899 Federals (Armidale) d Tamworth 14–7
- 1900 West Tamworth d Albions (Armidale) 8–0
- 1901 Carlton (Armidale) d West Tamworth 9–3

Year	Sawers Shield	Reserve Grade
1902	West Tamworth	
1903	Westend Seniors	
1904	Carlton (Armidale)	
1905	Hillgrove	
1906	Carlton (Armidale)	
1907	Westend Seniors	
1908	Hillgrove	
1909	East Tamworth	
1910	East Tamworth	
1911	West Tamworth	
1912	South Armidale	
1913	South Armidale	
1914	Hillgrove	

Year	Bruxner Cup	RESERVE GRADE
1924	Half-Holiday d School	
1925	Tingha d GPS Old Boys	
1926	GPS Old Boys	
1927		
1928		
1929	Uralla	De La Salle College
1930		
1931		
1932	Teachers College d Armidale High	
1933	Teachers College 1	
1934		
1935		
1936		
1937		
1938		
1939		
1940		
1941		

Year	Sawers Shied	Reserve Grade	3rd Grade	4th Grade	Women's
1948	Armidale Teachers College				
1949	New England University College				
1950	Armidale Teachers College	Kentucky			
1951	Armidale City	Armidale Teachers College 2			
1952	Armidale City	Armidale Teachers College 2			
1953	Walcha				
1954	University of New England				
1955	Tamworth				
1956	University of New England				
1957	Armidale Teachers College				
1958	Guyra				
1959	University of New England				
1960	University of New England				
1961	Armidale Teachers College				
1962	Robb College				
1963	Wright College				
1964	Armidale Teachers College				
1965	Wright College				
1966	Wright College				
1967	Armidale City				
1968	Armidale City & Robb College				
1969	Robb College				
1970	Armidale City				
1971	Earle Page College				
1972	Earle Page College				
1973	Earle Page College				
1974	Earle Page College				
1975	Armidale City				
1976	Armidale City				
1977	Armidale City				
1978	Armidale City				
1979	Armidale City				
1980	Armidale City				
1981	St Alberts College				
1982	United				
1983	Robb College				
1984	St Alberts College				
1985	St Alberts College				
1986	Armidale Old Boys				
1987	Glen Innes				
1988	St Alberts College				
1989	Glen Innes				
1990	Armidale Old Boys				
1991	Robb College				
1992	Armidale Old Boys				
1993	Armidale Old Boys				
1994	Armidale Old Boys				
1995	Armidale Old Boys				
1996	Armidale Old Boys				
1997	Robb College				
1998	St Alberts College				
1999	Armidale Old Boys				
2000	Robb College				
2001	Armidale Old Boys				
2002	Armidale Old Boys				
2003	Armidale Blues				
2004	Armidale Blues				
2005	St Alberts College				
2006	St Alberts College				
2007	St Alberts College				
2008	Armidale Blues				
2009	St Alberts College				
2010	Armidale Blues				
2011	St Alberts College				
2012	UNE Barbarians				
2013	Armidale Blues				
2014	Armidale Blues				
2015	Armidale Blues				
2016					Glen Innes
2017					
2018	Robb College				Robb College
2019	Robb College	Robb College	Glen Innes	St Alberts College	Barbarians
2020	Walcha	Tamworth	Tamworth	No Competition	Pirates
2021					
2022	St Alberts College	St Alberts College	St Alberts College	No Competition	St Alberts College
2023	St Alberts College	Glen Innes			

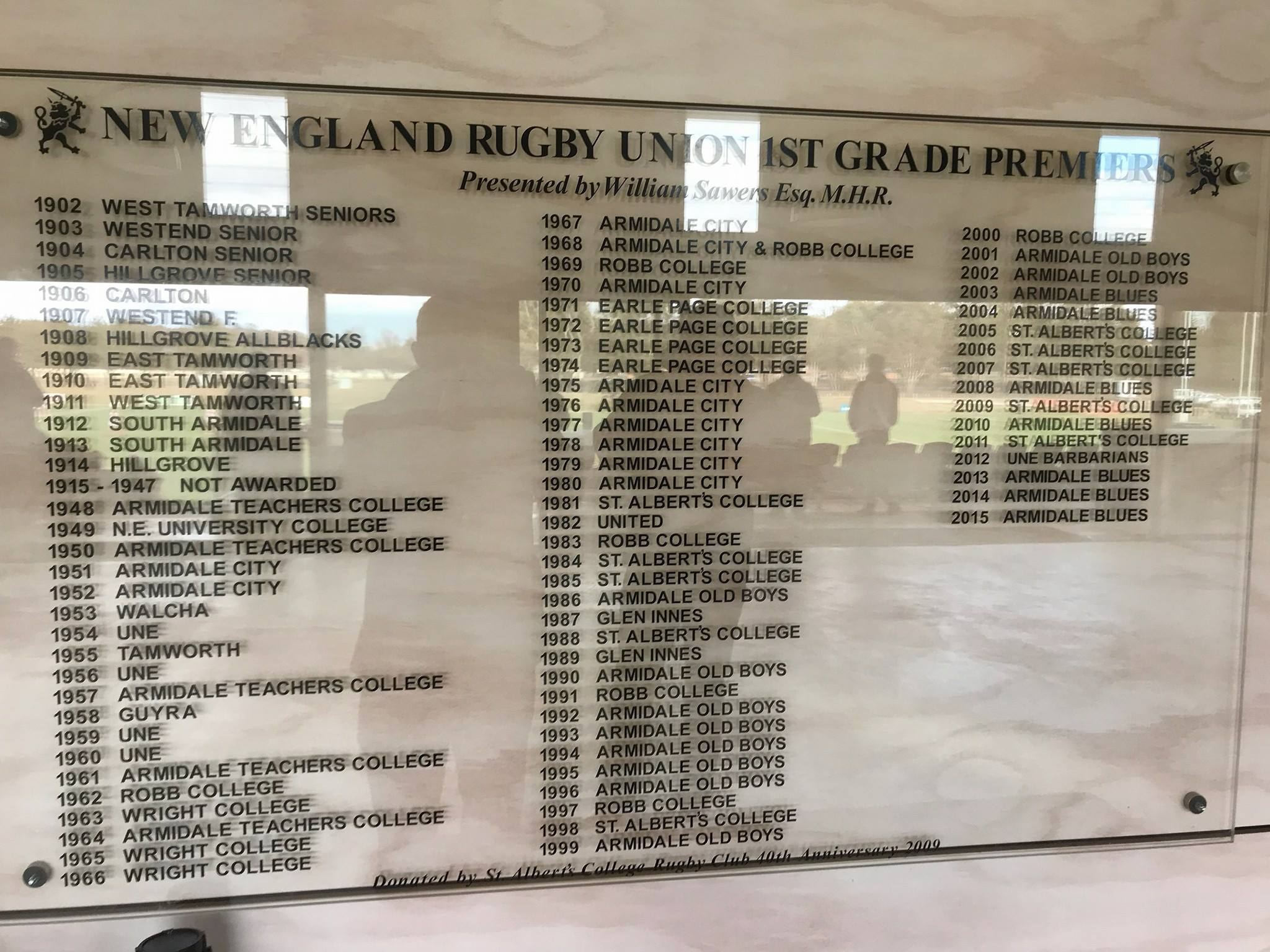
Sawers Shield Winners, Bellevue Oval, Armida

== Clubs ==
=== First-grade clubs ===
- The Armidale Rugby Club (Blues) R.U.F.C
- Barbarians R.U.F.C.
- Robb Rugby Club R.U.F.C.
- St Alberts College R.U.F.C
- Tamworth Rugby Union Sporting Club (2018–present)
- Walcha R.U.F.C (2020, 2024–present)

=== Lower-grade clubs ===
- Glen Innes R.U.F.C
- Tenterfield Bumblebees R.U.F.C

=== Former NERU clubs ===
- Armidale City
- Armidale Old Boys
- Bundarra
- City United (1994–2002)
- Coffs Harbour Knights (2020)
- Earle Page College (1964-1984 & 1989–1990)
- East Tamworth
- Gunnedah (now with Central North RU)
- Guy Fawkes Ebor
- Guyra Ghosts
- Gwydir River Rats (Bingara)
- Hillgrove
- Inverell (now with Central North RU)
- Kentucky
- Page-Wright Barbarians (1985–1988)
- Rockdale
- Teachers College (TC) - The Chalkies
- University College
- United Colleges - The Dirty Ducks (1974–93)
- Uralla Miners
- West Tamworth
- Wright College Redmen (1958–73,1989–94, 2015- )

=== City-United Historical note ===
During the 1994 pre-season, it became clear that neither United nor Armidale City would have enough players to field four grades or be competitive.

Given that quite a few of City's squad were former United players, NERU Secretary and former United President Dick Croft encouraged the two clubs to join forces, and City United was born.

The new club competed strongly for the next eight years before merging with Armidale Old Boys for the 2003 season. This resulted in the new Armidale Blues Rugby Club, which combines the history and tradition of City, the professionalism and competitiveness of Old Boys, and the spirit and student depth of United.

== Wallabies, Walleroos and Waratahs ==
Below is a list of identified state and national representatives. This may not be a complete list.

Wallabies:

- Francis Finley, 1904, Armidale
- Bill Hirschberg, 1905, Carlton
- Bill Laycock, 1925–26, Winterbourne (Walcha)
- Raymond Bowden, 1926, Walcha, Hamilton (Newcastle)
- John Lamb, 1928, Carlton, Armidale Teachers College, Eastern Suburbs (Sydney)
- Desmond Bannon, 1946, Armidale Teachers College
- Peter Fenwicke, 1957–59, Walcha
- Andrew Laurie, 1964 Wallaby Tour NZ, Walcha
- Richard How, 1967, Armidale City
- Ian Proctor, 1967, Wright College
- Greg Cornelsen, 1974–1982, Earle Page, & Armidale City
- John Hipwell,1968–82, Waratahs (Newcastle), Armidale City
- Peter Horton, 1974–79, Armidale City
- Damian Smith, 1993-1998

Armidale born:

- Eric Hutchinson, 1937–43, university (Sydney)
- Frank Hutchinson, 1936–37, university (Sydney)

Walleroos:

- Bronwyn Calvert, 1994–98, Robb College.

Junior Wallabies:

- Mitch Watts, 2022, Tamworth, Randwick (Sydney)

Wallabies & Walleroos from local schools:

- Adrian Skeggs (TAS), Brothers (Brisbane), Warringah (Sydney), NSW, Qld
- James Holbeck (TAS), 1997–2001, Randwick
- James Bailey (TAS), 1957-58 Wallabies Tour, Molong, Moree, Hawkesbury Ag College
- Karen Lambert (Oxley High School, Tamworth), 1995, Eastern Suburbs (Sydney), West Harbour (Sydney)
- Sam Payne (TAS),1996-1997, Eastern Suburbs (Sydney)
- Troy Jacques (Our Lady of Rosary College, Tamworth), 2000, Northern Suburbs (Sydney)
- Kate Brown (Calrossy Anglican School, Tamworth), 2017, Tuggeranong

== See also ==
Rugby union in New South Wales
