= Tamworth Rugby Union Sporting Club =

Australian rugby union club, based in Tamworth, NSW

Australia
- Union: New England Rugby Union
- Nickname: Magpies
- Founded: 1880; 146 years ago and 1952; 74 years ago
- Disbanded: 1919; 107 years ago
- Location: Tamworth NSW
- Ground(s): Rugby Park, Marius Park (Capacity: 2,000)
- President: Chris Shaw
- Director of Rugby: Damian Henry
Principal kit

Official website
- www.tamworthrugby.com.au

The Tamworth Rugby Union Sporting Club is an amateur rugby union club in Tamworth, New South Wales, Australia.

The club fields three men's teams and one women's team in the New England Rugby Union (NERU), an affiliate of the New South Wales Country Rugby Union.

== Origins ==
Within only six years of the union code being properly established in England, the Tamworth Grammar School issued a challenge to the Armidale Grammar School in 1877 for a 12-a-side match. The Tamworth Grammar School renamed Tamworth College, continued to be a strong nursery of rugby union well into the 1900s.

Two years later, this had motivated the formation of the senior Arlington Club and Tamworth Club, with goalposts erected on The Oval (now Bicentennial Park).

In 1880, a rugby game was played against the Maitland Albions.

The Tamworth Rugby Club appeared in the list of clubs that formed the New England Branch of the New South Wales Rugby Union. On 12 May 1880, the Armidale Football Club was formed to play games rugby rules. In 1882, Tamworth was listed as one of the 35 clubs subscribed to the Southern Rugby Union at their annual general meeting.

In 1891, the Newcastle Football Club played Tamworth with a scratch team, winning 10 points to 3, and a combined Armidale team won against a local Tamworth team by three points.

By 1893 there were club competitions involving Tamworth, Gunnedah, Quirindi, Werris Creek, Boggabri and Narrabri. The Tamworth-Acme Club lost 0–6 against a team from the newly-formed New England Rugby Union.

In 1892, NERU was formed, with a subsequent formation meeting in 1893. The Tamworth-based teams were Acme, Tamworth and Royal Standard. Rugby continued to be played around Tamworth and Armidale, with teams leaving and joining the competition.

In 1900, Tamworth passed a resolution at its annual meeting to leave NERU. The issue was that the local clubs had supported NERU for several years, but NERU had never scheduled a final match in Tamworth.

In 1901, West Tamworth won the NERU championship, defeating the Albions (Armidale) 8–0. In 1903, Central North (Tamworth) was formed. It applied to affiliate with the NSW Rugby Union.

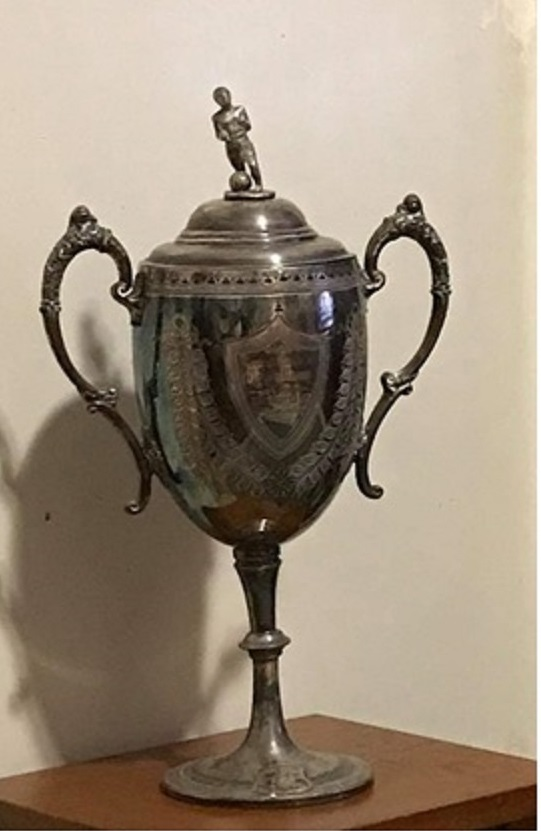
Central North Cup 1903 – thanks to Laura Jones

North Tamworth won the Central Northern Rugby Union Cup in 1903, 1904 (Murrurundi 11–0) and 1905 (Murrurundi 16–0).

In 1911, the East Tamworth Club wrote to Central North Rugby Football, stating it strongly resented the move of some players to the new code.

In 1912, East Tamworth won the premiership over Walcha in the last game of the season with a one-point victory. The West Tamworth Rugby Union team played Walcha for the Danahey Cup. In outlying villages Dungowan, Nemingha and Woolomin were union rivals, before changing to rugby league. The East Tamworth Rugby Union Football Club was very successful in the local Tamworth "Observer Cup" competition, winning the cup in 1909, 1910 and 1912.

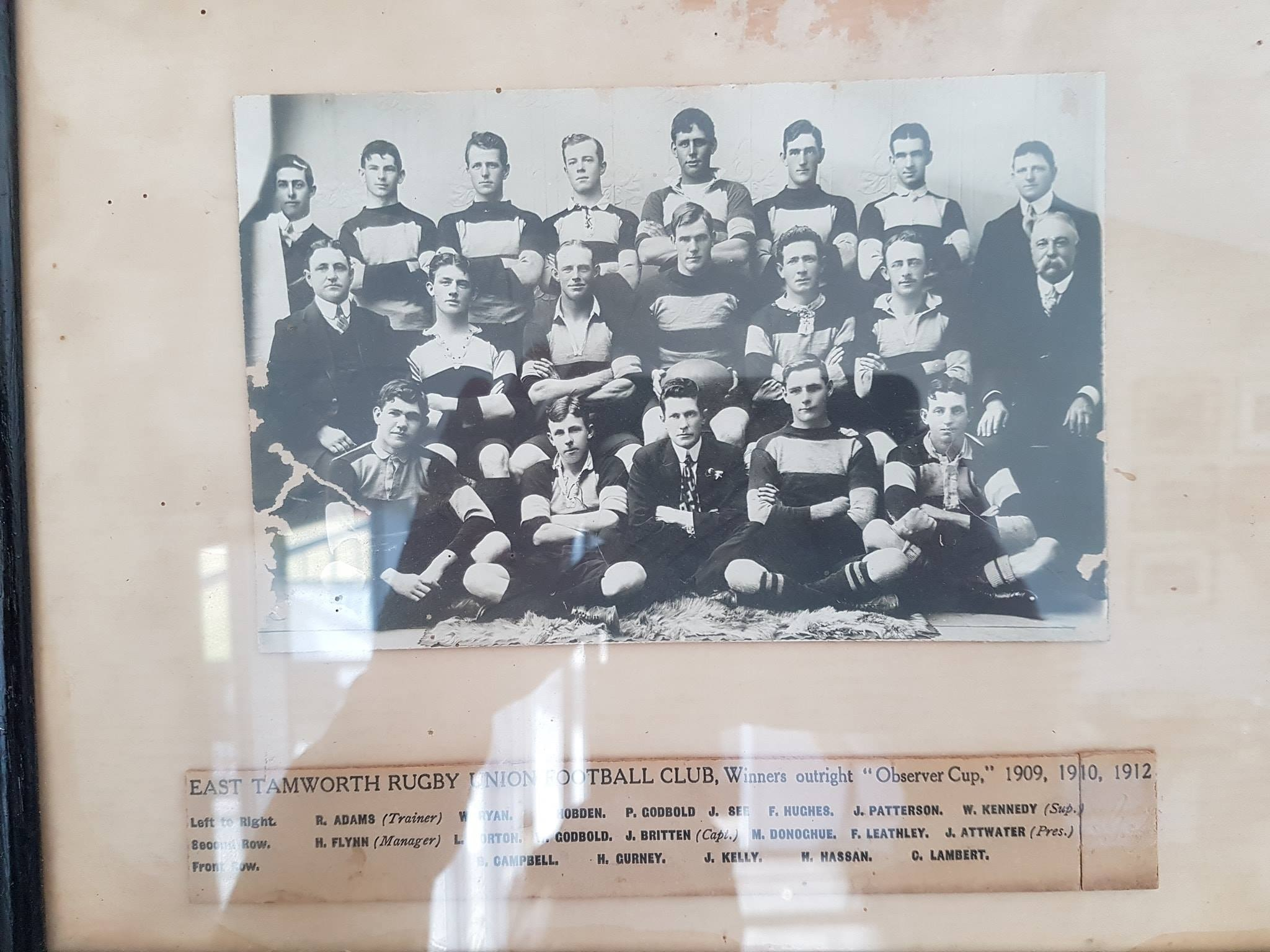
1912 East Tamworth Source: Tamworth RUSC

== The split and World War I ==
Many rugby union competitions dissolved for patriotic reasons and lack of numbers during World War I. An Inverell Times report on 24 April 1915 stated that the North West Rugby Football Union decided that anyone who was able to train for football should enlist and resolved to abandon all competition games. Numbers were lost to the war effort or to the rival league code. A meeting of rugby enthusiasts at Nail's Criterion Hotel on 16 June 1916 resurrected the CNRU. The Manly Rugby Club visited Tamworth later that month and played games against the Tamworth Union 15. In July, Tamworth and Manilla played a match with funds raised devoted to a local patriotic fund.

The league movement affected rugby with the annual general meeting notice for the New England Football Union of 1919, where consideration was made as to whether the union should cease its activities in favour of the league game.

== The revival ==
An advertisement was placed in the Northern Daily Leader calling a meeting to gauge interest in forming a new club. About a dozen people attended. All were fellows who had played rugby in other places, one of whom was former Gordon player Stan Blake. The 1951 meeting resolved to form the Tamworth Rugby Union Club.

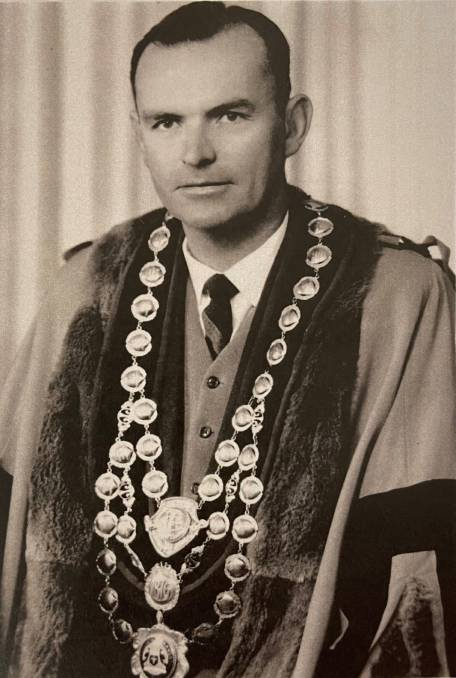
Doug Campbell - Club President 1956, Club Secretary 1954–55. Tamworth City Council Mayor 1957-59Source: Tamworth Regional Council

An application was made to enter a team in the 1952 New England competition with the inaugural game against the Armidale City Rugby Club on 5 April 1952.

The first group of players was made up of former rugby players and players who had never played the game before. Many were employees of the NSW Department of Main Roads and the Bank of Australasia. Because most of the players had to work Saturday mornings, which would prevent them from travelling to away games, Jeff Jefferies, manager of the bank and the first president of the reformed club, gave Saturday mornings off to any man who played rugby. Ted Wood from the NSW Department of Main Roads did the same.

The club's first try was not scored until the 1953 season by Doug Schultz.

By 1954, player numbers had increased such that a second grade side was playing and in 1955 with Ian Sinclair as coach the first grade side won the New England competition at Armidale against Glen Innes. Sinclair had to play as two forwards were injured.

In the 1950s and early 1960s, Tamworth Rugby hosted games at Tamworth's No. 1 oval. Touring teams included the Fijians in 1954, who won against New England 37–14. The British Lions beat Combined Country 27–14 in 1959.

The revived Central North zone evolved from the old Southern Zone in 1958 under the approval of the NSWRU. A meeting had been held in Tamworth in November 1955 to discuss the formation of a new Southern Zone competition in New England. A further meeting was called by the Tamworth club in November 1956 to discuss football arrangements for 1957. Many clubs were upset by the stop-start nature of the NERFU competition when university and Armidale Teachers College holiday breaks meant players were not available to field teams.

Teams in the Tamworth-based competition had played in the southern zone of the NEFRU for several years. In early 1958, the Walcha, Tamworth, Gunnedah and Quirindi clubs applied to the NSW Rugby Union for recognition as the Central Northern Union. Despite some opposition the application was granted. During this time other towns now playing in Central North formed their own clubs, as well as the establishment of the Tamworth Pirates Rugby Club, who evolved out of the Tamworth Country based at Kootingal.

== The 1960s and 1970s ==
In 1969, the Fijian national team revisited the region and played the New England team in front of 7000 people at No.1 oval winning the game 37–14.

The standard of play in Central North began to improve in this period with the appearance of the first Australian Rugby Manual, and the arrival at Tamworth of some ex-Sydney Grade players in Bill Feggans (NSW Representative), Peter Horsefield and Vince Symons strengthened the ranks of players and later Coaches. However, the great Narrabri teams of the Seventies steam-rolled all before them in the competition.

== The 1980s and 1990s ==
In 2000, most of the successful players from the 1990s either retired or moved away from Tamworth and the club could only field one senior team.

== The 2000s and 2010s ==
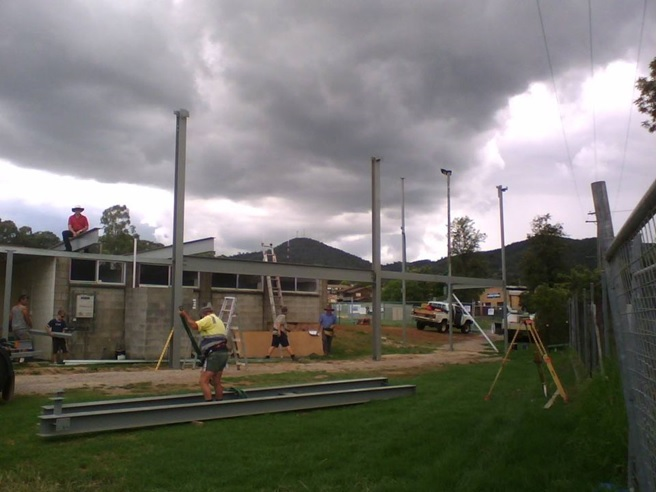
New clubhouse under construction

The new clubhouse was built in 2010. Club member and secretary Julian Smith, an architect, prepared the design. For stage 1, funding for the change rooms came from selling the Tamworth Club. Stage 2 was funded by a $300,000 loan from the National Australia Bank and a $1,000 per year contribution from 30 donors for a 3-year period to help offset the interest.

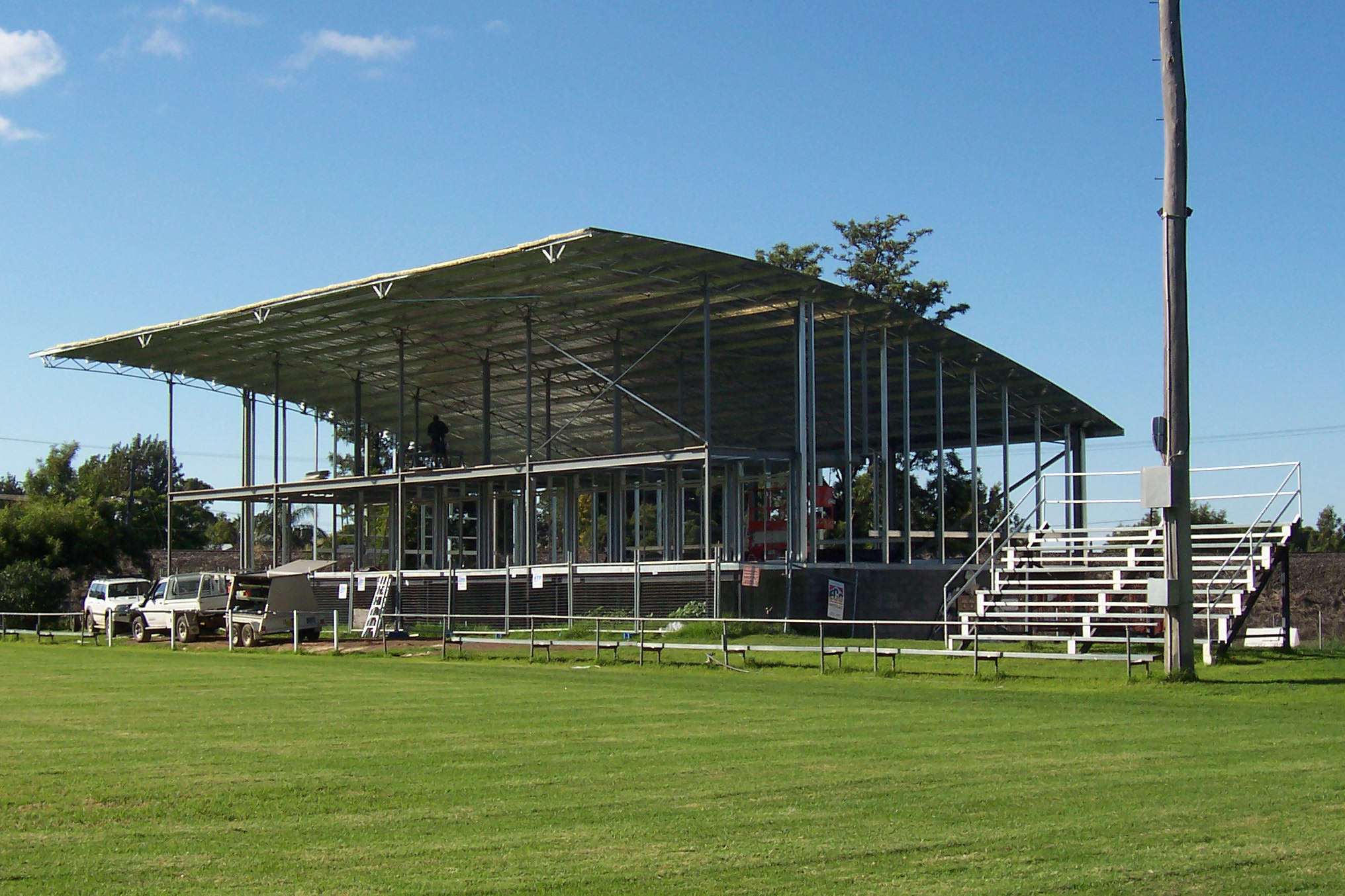
New clubhouse Steel Frame

The Tamworth club had club match days with usually two senior matches and no junior games. After merger talks between the two zones failed, and after a 59-year absence, the Tamworth club decided to rejoin the New England Rugby Union in 2018.

== Premierships ==
Premierships:

- First grade premierships: 1956 (New England), 1959 (Central North), 1960, 1963, 1969, 1991, 1993, 1994 and 1996.
- Reserve grade premierships (Central North): 1966, 1972, 1989, 1991, 1993.
- Third grade: NERU: 2020.
- Fourth grade: NERU: 2019 (jointly with St Alberts College).
- Under 19s (Central North): 1982, 1983, 1990, 2005, 2007 and 2011.
- Under 17s (Central North): 2002, 2005, 2007, 2009, 2010 and 2011.
- Club champions (Central North): 1993, 1994 and 1996. NERU: 2020.

== See also ==
- List of rugby union clubs in Australia
- New South Wales Country Rugby Union § New England Rugby Union
