= Rebecca Young (rugby) =

Australia international dual-code rugby footballer

- Born: 27 December 1981 (age 44) Newcastle, New South Wales, Australia
- Height: 168 cm (5 ft 6 in)
- Weight: 90 kg (14 st 2 lb)
- Notable relative: Michael Young (husband)

Rugby union career
- Position: Inside centre
Senior career
Years	Team	Apps	(Points)
1991-2011	Merewether Carlton		
Provincial / State sides
Years	Team	Apps	(Points)
–	NSW Country		
International career
Years	Team	Apps	(Points)
2006-2007	Australia		
- Rugby league career

Playing information
- Position: Prop
Club
Years	Team	Pld	T	G	FG	P
2019	Sydney Roosters	2	0	0	0	0
Representative
Years	Team	Pld	T	G	FG	P
2011–20	Indigenous All Stars	8	0	0	0	0
2011–18	New South Wales	7	0	0	0	0
2011–17	Australia	9	0	0	0	0
2018	Prime Minister's XIII	1	0	0	0	0
- Source: RLP As of 30 November 2020

Rebecca Young (née Anderson; born 27 December 1981) is an Australian rugby league and rugby union footballer who played for the Sydney Roosters in the NRL Women's Premiership.

Primarily a prop, she is an Australian, New South Wales, Indigenous All Stars and Prime Minister's XIII representative. In rugby union, she represented Australia at the 2006 Women's Rugby World Cup.

== Background ==
Young was born in Newcastle, New South Wales and is of Indigenous Australian descent. She is married to former Newcastle Knights player Michael Young.

== Playing career ==
=== Rugby union ===
Young played rugby union for Merewether Carlton from 1999 to 2011 and represented the New South Wales Country team.

In 2006, she represented Australia at the Women's World Cup in Canada. She was named in the Wallaroos 22-player squad that toured New Zealand in October 2007.

=== Rugby league ===
In 2011, Young began playing in the Sydney Metropolitan Women's Rugby League and for the Indigenous All Stars in the inaugural women's All Stars match. Later that year, she made her Test debut for Australia against Samoa and represented New South Wales in their 0–26 loss to Queensland.

In 2013, Young was a member of Australia's 2013 Women's Rugby League World Cup-winning squad, alongside her sister-in-laws Emma and Julie Young.

In 2017, Young was a member of Australia's 2017 Women's Rugby League World Cup-winning squad but did not play in the final.

On 6 October 2018, she captained the Prime Minister's XIII in their 40–4 win over Papua New Guinea.

On 1 July 2019, Young joined the Sydney Roosters NRL Women's Premiership squad. In Round 1 of the 2019 NRL Women's season, she made her debut for the Roosters in a 12–16 loss to the New Zealand Warriors.
