= Illawarriors =

Australian rugby union club, based in Illawarra, NSW

(Australia) Illawarriors
- Union: New South Wales Rugby Union
- Founded: 2006
- Region: Illawarra, New South Wales

The Illawarriors are a rugby union franchise based in the Illawarra, New South Wales, Australia. They are controlled by the Illawarra Rugby Union.

Currently, they compete in the New South Wales Country Rugby Union championship. Their home matches are played at WIN Stadium.
