= Cooks Hill Rugby Club =

Australian rugby union club, based in Cooks Hill, NSW

The Cooks Hill Rugby Club, known as the Brown Snakes, is located in Cooks Hill, New South Wales. The club currently fields three teams in the Newcastle and Hunter Rugby Union: two men's teams, one in the Suburban competition and one in the Friday Night 4s competition, and one women's team. Club colours are brown and white. The club plays and trains at Empire Park, Bar Beach. The Brown Snakes were established in 2007.

The values at the club focus on the social aspects of rugby. Preference is always given to enjoyment of the game rather than competitiveness. Notable elements of the season social calendar for the club include the preseason away trial, Ladies day, the Brown Snake Ball, Muswellbrook Bus Trip and Silly Sunday. The club is largely made up of players from country NSW, but also includes some originating from Newcastle, Sydney and abroad.

The Brown Snakes have won the following premierships:

- C Grade (2009);
- A Grade (2015 & 2016);
- B Grade (2016);
- Suburban competition (2019 & 2022);
- Friday Night 4s (2026).
