= Far North Coast Rugby Union =

Governing body of rugby union in New South Wales, Australia

- Sport: Rugby Union
- Jurisdiction: Far North Coast, Australia
- Affiliation: Rugby Australia
- Regional affiliation: New South Wales Country Rugby Union
- Headquarters: Lismore, New South Wales
- President: Joseph Allen
- (New South Wales)

The Far North Coast District Rugby Union, or FNCRU, is the governing body for the sport of rugby union within the District of Far North Coast in New South Wales, Australia. It is a member of the New South Wales Country Rugby Union.

== History ==
In 1946, a Far North Coast team played a Toowoomba team.

== Clubs ==
=== First Grade Clubs ===
- Ballina Rugby Union Club
- Bangalow
- Byron Bay
- Casino
- Casurina Beach
- Lennox Head
- Lismore
- Wollongbar/Alstonville

=== Lower Grades/Defunct Clubs ===
- Evans River
- Iluka Cossacks
- Kyogle Cockies
- Mullumbimby
- Murwillumbah Gentlemen
- Richmond Range
- Woolgoolga Whitepointers
- Yamba Buccaneers

== Venues ==
These are the venues for the FNCRU

Ballina- Quays Reserve, Ballina

Bangalow- Schultz Oval, Bangalow

Byron Bay- Memorial Recreational Field, Byron Bay

Casuarina Beach- Casuarina Beach Rugby Fields, Casuarina

Casino- Albert Park, Casino

Evans River- Stan Payne Oval, Evans Head

Grafton- Hay Street Rugby Fields, Grafton

Iluka- Ken Leeson Oval, Ilulka

Kyogle- Don Gulley Oval, Kyogle

Lennox Head- Williams Reserve, Lennox Head

Lismore City- Lismore City Rugby Grounds, Lismore

Mullumbimby- Alby Lofts Oval, Brunswick Heads / Schultz Oval, Bangalow

Southern Cross University- Maurie Ryan Oval, East Lismore

Wollongbar-Alstonville- Lyle Park, Wollongbar

Yamba- Kane Douglas Field / Coldstream Oval, Yamba

Tenterfield- Federation Reserve, Tenterfield

== Clubs ==
The clubs that compete in the senior grade competition:

- Ballina Seahorses
- Bangalow Rebels
- Byron Bay Sandcrabs
- Casuarina Beach Barbarians
- Casino Bulls
- Evans River Killer Whales
- Grafton Redmen
- Iluka Cossacks
- Kyogle Cockies
- Lennox Head Trojans
- Lismore City
- Mullumbimby Moonshiners
- Southern Cross University Gold Rats
- Wollongbar/Alstonville Pioneers
- Yamba Buccaneers
- Tenterfield Bumblebees

Grades

Coopers FNCRU 1st Grade

Coopers FNCRU Reserve Grade

Coopers FNCRU Presidents Cup

Coopers FNCRU Women's 10s

McDonald FNCJRU Under 9s

McDonald FNCJRU Under 10s

McDonald FNCJRU Under 11s

McDonald FNCJRU Under 12s

McDonald FNCJRU Under 13s

McDonald FNCJRU Under 14s

McDonald FNCJRU Under 15s

McDonald FNCJRU Under 16s

McDonald FNCJRU Under 17s

Coopers sponsor the FNCRU & Men's & Women's

McDonalds sponsor the FNCJRU Junior Rugby

== See also ==
- Rugby union in New South Wales
- List of Australian club rugby union competitions
