= Illawarra Rugby Union =

Rugby union organisation in Australia

- Sport: Rugby union
- Jurisdiction: Illawarra, New South Wales, Australia
- Abbreviation: IDRU
- Affiliation: New South Wales Rugby Union
- Headquarters: New South Wales, Australia
- President: Tom Ellicott
- Chairman: John Marsters

Official website
- www.idru.com.au
- (New South Wales)

The Illawarra District Rugby Union, or IDRU, is the governing body for the sport of rugby union within the District of Illawarra, New South Wales in Australia. It is a member of the New South Wales Country Rugby Union.

== Illawarra clubs ==
=== Men's ===
The clubs that compete in the men's senior grade competition are:

==== First-grade clubs ====
- Bowral Blacks (website)
- Camden Rams (website)
- Campbelltown Harlequins
- Kiama (website)
- Shoalhaven (website)
- Tech Waratahs (website)
- University of Wollongong (website)
- Wollongong Vikings (website)
- Woonona Shamrocks RUFC (website)

=== Women's ===
Women's senior rugby is represented through University of Wollongong, who compete in Sydney's Jack Scott Cup against; West Harbour, Eastern Suburbs, Sydney University, Parramatta, Blacktown, Warringah and Campbellton.

== Former clubs ==
- Avondale Wombats (website) (moved to Illawarra Rugby League)
- Shellharbour City/Southern Crushers Rugby
- Vincentia
- Wollondilly White Waratahs

== Kiama Sevens ==
Kiama Sevens is an annual ARU club tournament that attracts local, interstate and international teams. The first tournament was run in 1973. In 2018, the tournament will be in its 47th year.

== Representative teams ==
The IDRU selects representative teams each year which play under the name "Illawarriors". The senior men's team, Colts u20 and junior age-group teams compete in the annual New South Wales Country Rugby Union championship. Country Cockatoos is a team selected from the NSW Country Regions (Illawarra, Hunter, Central Coast, New England, Central West, Western Plains, Central North) that compete against ACT Brumbies Provincial, NSW Subbies and Queensland Country.

=== Caldwell Cup results – seniors ===
- 2018 - Illawarra 37 - 15 Central West
- 2017 - Newcastle Hunter 46 - 7 Illawarra
- 2016 - Illawarra 31 - 17 Central Coast
- 2015 - Illawarra 24 - 14 Newcastle Hunter
- 2014 - Central West 19 - 5 Illawarra
- 2013 - Newcastle Hunter 28 - 18 Illawarra
- 2012 - Newcastle Hunter 29 - 13 Illawarra

=== NSW Country Cockatoos training squad ===
- 2018 - Paul Tuala, Tom Baker, Takunda Chimwaza, Sam Latu, Amos Leef (University), Tim Small, Henry Yuill (Bowral), Leighton Cowley (Kiama), Aisake Tuevu (Tech-Waratahs), Dane Nethery (Vikings), Jay Spencer (Camden), Tait-Tania Tuumuliileuao (Avondale)
- 2017 - Paul Tuala, Wayne Ngatai, Andy Papworth, Andrew Rae (University), Leighton Cowley (Kiama), Jesse Roche (Woonona), Henry Yuill (Bowral)
- 2016 - Paul Tuala, Nik Rangiuira, Tyler Aitkin, Allyd Owen (University), Aaron Louden, Alex Wilson (Shoalhaven), Anthony Allport, Rhys Peters (Wonoona), Niko Degei (Kiama)

=== Women's country championships ===
- 2018 - Lady Illawarriors

== Illawarra premiers ==
=== 1st-grade premiers ===
- 2019 - Avondale def. Wonoona
- 2018 - Bowral 34 - 18 Avondale
- 2017 - Avondale 27 - 12 Vikings
- 2016 - University 10 - 7 Wonoona
- 2015 - Avondale 39 - 31 University
- 2014 - University 20 - 11 Camden
- 2013 - Camden 20 - 10 Avondale
- 2012 - Avondale 40 - 21 Tech-Waratahs
- 2011 - Vikings 29 - 17 Avondale
- 2010 - Vikings 37 - 0 Woonona
- 2009 - Tech-Waratahs 19 - 14 Avondale
- 2008 - Shoalhaven 27 - 12 Avondale

==== Geoff Shaw Medal – Grand Final Man of Match ====
- 2018 - Tim Small (Bowral)
- 2017 - Andre Ltula (Avondale)
- 2016 - Rory Davis (Woonona)
- 2015 - Eli Sinoti (Avondale)
- 2014 - Andrew Lindsay (University)
- 2013 - Lee Russell (Camden)
- 2012 - Andre Ltula (Avondale)
- 2011 - Nick McAuley (Vikings)
- 2010 - Paul Fisher (Vikings)

== 2nd-grade premiers ==
- 2023 - Avondale 39 - 35 Shoalhaven
- 2018 - Bowral 28 - 18 Campbelltown
- 2017 - Bowral RUFC 35 - 10 Vikings
- 2016 - Campbelltown 27 - 26 Woonona
- 2015 - Camden 20 - 15 Camden
- 2014 - University 17 - 14 Avondale
- 2013 - Vikings 42 - 15 Tech Waratahs
- 2012 - Vikings 25 - 10 Tech Waratahs
- 2011 - Avondale 41 - 15 Woonona
- 2010 - Vikings 22 - 17 Vincentia
- 2009 - Camden 14 - 7 Vincentia
- 2008 - Engadine Heathcote 20 - 12 Avondale

== 3rd-grade premiers ==
- 2018 Camden 24 - 19 Shoalhaven
- 2017 Shoalhaven 24 - 0 Vikings
- 2016 Vikings 23 - 15 Vincentia
- 2015 Vincentia 18 - 12 Vikings
- 2014 Tech-Waratahs 33 - 10 Avondale
- 2013 Wollondilly 38 - 17 University
- 2012 Camden 19 - 3 Tech-Waratahs
- 2011 Avondale 40 - 10 Vikings
- 2010 Avondale 19 - 15 University
- 2009 - Woonona 12 - 10 University
- 2008 - Avondale 19 - 10 Wollondilly

== Colts/U20 ==
- 2018 No competition
- 2017 No competition
- 2016 University 10 - 7 Woonona
- 2015 University 31 - 14 Campbelltown
- 2014 University 15 - 11 Woonona
- 2013 Vikings 47 - 10 Bowral
- 2004 Bowral 20 - 17 Kiama

== Illawarra Club championship ==
- 2018 - Avondale
- 2017 - Avondale
- 2016 - Woonona Shamrocks
- 2015 - Avondale
- 2014 - Avondale
- 2013 - Woonona Shamrocks
- 2012 - Avondale
- 2011 - Avondale

== See also ==
- Rugby union in New South Wales
- List of Australian club rugby union competitions
