= Michael Young (rugby league) =

Australian rugby league footballer

Personal information
- Full name: Michael Young
- Born: 11 February 1984 (age 41); Camden, New South Wales, Australia
- Height: 184 cm (6 ft 0 in)
- Weight: 99 kg (15 st 8 lb)

Playing information
- Position: Hooker, Fullback, Second-row
Club
Years	Team	Pld	T	G	FG	P
2004–08	Newcastle Knights	20	0	0	0	0
- Source: As of 8 February 2019
- Spouse: Rebecca Anderson

Michael Young (born 11 February 1984) is an Australian former professional rugby league footballer who last played for the Newcastle Knights in the National Rugby League. He played as a hooker and was used as a utility player.

== Background ==
Young was born in Camden, New South Wales.

== Playing career ==
Young made his first grade debut for Newcastle in Round 4 2004 against St George which ended in a 48–2 loss. Young's final game in first grade was a 38–26 loss against the Wests Tigers in Round 10 2008.

== Personal life ==
Young married Rebecca Anderson (now Rebecca Young) who played at inside centre for the Australian Women's rugby union team, the 'Wallaroos'.
