= Steve Merrick =

- Full name: Steven Paul Merrick
- Born: 22 November 1968 (age 57) Singleton, NSW, Australia

Rugby union career
- Position: Scrum-half
International career
Years	Team	Apps	(Points)
1995	Australia	2	(0)

Steven Paul Merrick (born 22 November 1968) is an Australian former rugby union international.

Merrick played rugby league while growing up in Singleton and did not switch codes to rugby union until he was 18. He played rugby union for Singleton in the Hunter Valley competition and was a New South Wales country representative.

In 1995, Merrick was Australia's scrum-half in two Bledisloe Cup Tests against New Zealand, taking the place of George Gregan. He had debuted for the New South Wales Waratahs earlier that year and his promotion to the Wallabies side was one of many made after team's poor showing at the 1995 Rugby World Cup.

Merrick turned down a lucrative contract from the ARFU to return to Singleton, where he worked as a coal truck driver. The contract would have required he be based in Sydney and play for the Waratahs rather than Singleton.

== See also ==
- List of Australia national rugby union players
