= Keith Walsham =

Australian rugby union international

- Full name: Keith Percival Walsham
- Born: 24 May 1941 (age 85) Newcastle, NSW, Australia

Rugby union career
- Position: Wing
International career
Years	Team	Apps	(Points)
1962–63	Australia	2	(3)

Keith Percival Walsham (born 24 May 1941) is an Australian former rugby union international.

Walsham received his education at Newcastle Boys' High School and Wellington High School.

A winger, Walsham scored a try against the touring All Blacks in 1962 playing with Newcastle and after then performing well for New South Wales Country earned a place in the Wallaby trials. He won Wallabies selection for the 1962 tour of New Zealand and impressed early in the tour with three tries against Poverty Bay to help him break into the team for the 1st Test in Wellington, which the Wallabies and All Blacks drew 9–9.

Walsham's second and final Wallabies cap came in 1963 in a win over England at the Sydney Sports Ground, where he scored a first half try. He was on the 1963 tour of South Africa, appearing in eight uncapped matches.

== See also ==
- List of Australia national rugby union players
