= Neil Adams (rugby union) =

Rugby player (1923–1986)

- Full name: Neil Joseph Adams
- Born: 26 August 1923 Wyong, NSW, Australia
- Died: 12 April 1986 (aged 62)

Rugby union career
- Position: Prop
International career
Years	Team	Apps	(Points)
1955	Australia	1	(0)

Neil Joseph Adams (26 August 1923 – 12 April 1986) was an Australian rugby union international.

Adams was born in Wyong on the NSW Central Coast and went to school in Newcastle, attending Marist Brothers Hamilton until he left at age 14 to become a carpet layer. After playing rugby league for the Army in the war years, during which he served in the Pacific, he made his first-grade rugby debut for his club Merewether Carlton in 1946.

A powerful prop, Adams had several years as a New South Wales representative before getting a Wallabies call up for the 1955 tour of New Zealand, at the late age of 31. He gained his solitary Wallabies cap in the 1st Test in Wellington.

Adams, who had six years as a NSW Country selector, died of pneumonia in 1986 aged 62.

== See also ==
- List of Australia national rugby union players
