= Inverell Argus =

The Inverell Argus, 6 January 1899

The Inverell Argus was a semi-weekly English language newspaper published in Inverell, New South Wales.

== History ==
The newspaper operated between 1874 and 1927 when it was sold to Sommerlad's Northern Newspapers Pty Ltd, who absorbed it into the Inverell Times. The paper's proprietors were its editor Alfred Peter (Bert) Mudge (1876–1954) and A.J. Easau. In 1912, E.C. Sommerlad became editor when he moved over from the competing paper Inverell Times.

== Digitisation ==
The paper has been digitised as part of the Australian Newspapers Digitisation Program of the National Library of Australia.

== See also ==
- List of newspapers in Australia
- List of newspapers in New South Wales
