= Len Diett =

Australia international rugby union & league player (1939-2018)

Personal information
- Full name: Leonard John Diett
- Born: 27 August 1939 Sydney, New South Wales, Australia
- Died: 13 January 2018 (aged 78)

Playing information

Rugby union
Representative
Years	Team	Pld	T	G	FG	P
1959	Australia	2	0	0	0	0

Rugby league
- Position: Five-eighth
Club
Years	Team	Pld	T	G	FG	P
1962–66	North Sydney	46	7	0	0	21
Representative
Years	Team	Pld	T	G	FG	P
1964	New South Wales	1	0	0	0	0

Leonard John "Len" Diett (1939-2018) was a cross code player who represented Australia in Rugby Union and also played rugby league for North Sydney in the NSWRL competition.

== Early life ==
Diett was born in Sydney and grew up in the Northern Beaches of the city. He played his junior rugby union with Manly-Warringah. Diett became captain of his local club at the age of 19.

== Playing career ==
=== Rugby Union ===
In 1959, Diett was selected to play for Australia rugby union side and became the second youngest person to achieve this honour.

=== Rugby League ===
In 1962, Diett decided to switch codes and joined NSWRL team North Sydney. In 1964, Diett was selected to play for New South Wales and featured in one game. In 1965, North Sydney had one of their best seasons in a number of years finishing second on the table. In the finals series, Diett featured in both games against South Sydney and St George which both ended in defeat. Diett played one more season with Norths before retiring at the end of 1966. He died at Ballina on the New South Wales north coast on 13 January 2018.
