= Woonona Shamrocks RUFC =

Australian rugby union club, based in Woonona, NSW

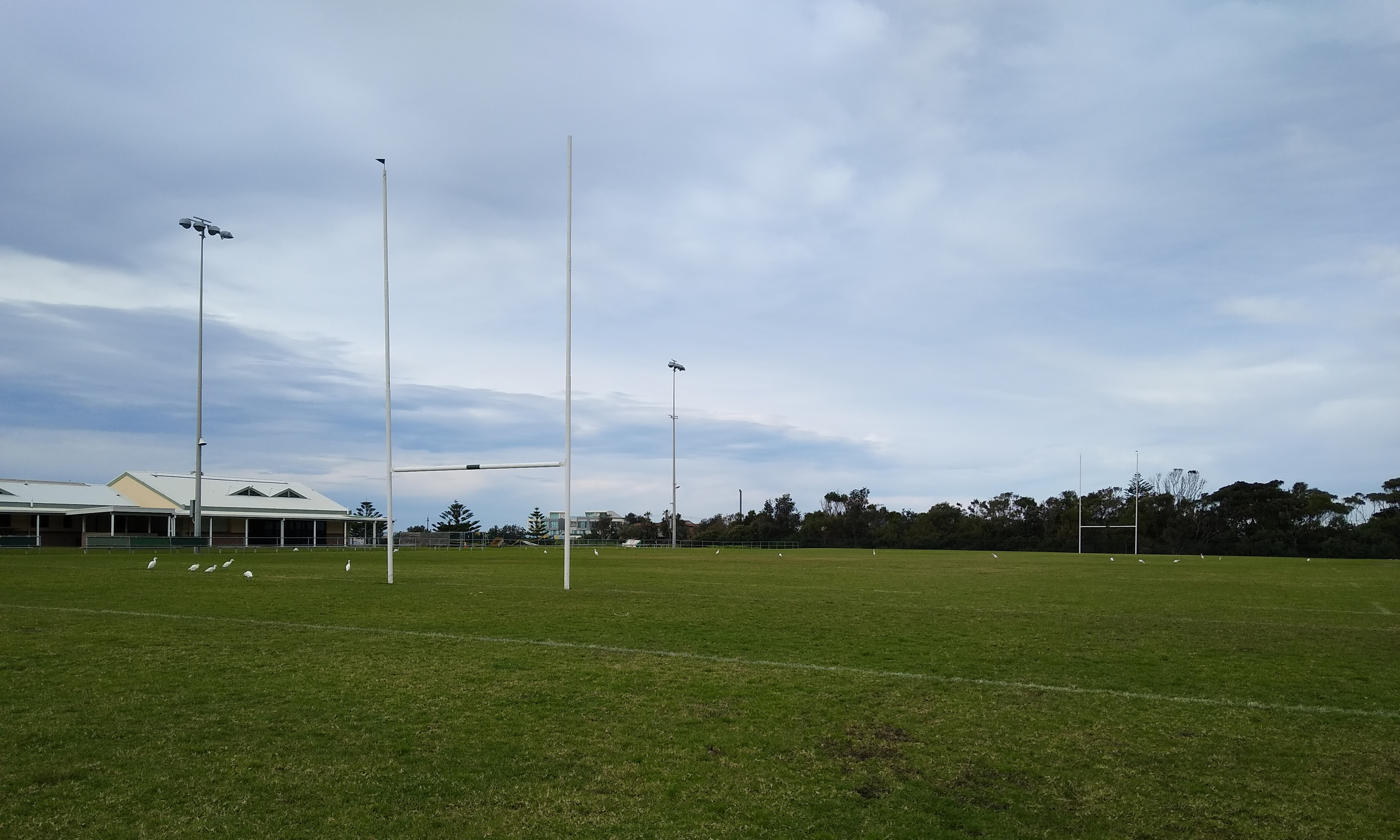
- Home ground in Woonona, New South Wales
- Founded: 1970; 56 years ago
- League: Illawarra Rugby Union
- Conference: NSW Country
- Location: Ocean Park, Woonona, NSW
- Colours: Green and White
- Head coach: Paul Ridgeway

Woonona Shamrocks Rugby Union Football Club is an Australian rugby union club which competes in the Illawarra District Rugby Union competition. The home ground is located at Ocean Park Woonona and is the only rugby club in the northern suburbs of Wollongong. The club was formed in 1970 after the amalgamation of the two clubs Shamrocks RUFC and Woonona Surf RUFC. The team colours are green and white with the shamrock being the team's logo.

== Pre-amalgamation ==
Shamrocks Rugby Union Football Club

Shamrocks RUFC was founded in 1966 by the Corrimal YCW (Young Christian Workers who had originally been known as the Aurora club). In that year the Illawarra district Rugby Union extended an invitation to the Shamrocks to enter a team in the annual pre-season knock-out competition. The team strip consisted of a white guernsey with a large red shamrock on the back, black shorts and red and white striped socks. Shamrocks won this knock-out and the IDRU subsequently invited them to play in the C Grade competition that year. Shamrocks went on to be 1966 Minor Premiers, only to lose the Grand Final 3-0. They continued this success into 1967, winning the Knock-out, minor premiership and the Grand Final to become premiers in only their second season. They retained the minor premiers tag in 1969, to make it three in a row, and though they missed out on a Grand Final that year they won promotion to B Grade for the 1969 competition.

Woonona Surf Rugby Union Football Club

Woonona Surf RUFC was founded in 1968, arising from the camaraderie developed by surf club members involved in the renovations to Woonona Surf Club. The aim was to keep the summer team together during winter. The club strip was a maroon Guernsey with two yellow “Vees” (similar to the Country Rugby League jumper), white shorts and maroon socks with yellow tops. They enjoyed early success, being Knock-out winners, and C Grade Premiers in 1968, beating Waratahs 16-6 in the Grand Final. In 1969, with both teams now in B Grade, Woonona Surf played Shamrocks in preliminary Final. Shamrocks scored five tries to four but lost 24-19, with Rod Gilmour kicking the Surf Club to victory. The Woonona team lost the Grand Final to the Teachers College.

== The forming of the club ==
Both teams had established a drinking base at Hoopers Royal Hotel Woonona with the publican Boyd Germyn becoming a strong supporter. A strong link developed between the two clubs with many members becoming mates by sharing each other's company in either the surf club during summer or the football clubs during winter. There was also a strong rivalry on the field.

Given the success of both the fledgling northern clubs the IDRU made it known that they wanted a Northern Suburbs Club in their competition that could field three grades. Both clubs originally rejected the idea, but the seed had been sown, and eventually, under continued pressure from the IDRU, a meeting of members from both clubs was held at Woonona-Bulli Soccer and Sports Club in 1969. After much discussion, enough of the rivals agreed to the amalgamation, however, in a sign of things to come, the unified club ignored the IDRU's pressure to call themselves Northern Suburbs and decided that they would call themselves Woonona Shamrocks instead. Their home ground was to be at Nicolson park (In front of Woonona Surf Club). Unfortunately, the amalgamation did not initially result in the creation of a strong new club – many players from both teams were against the unification and decided not to join the fledgling club. Fortunately to counter this loss, up to 15 ex-league players from St Paul's College Bellambi (more young Christians) decided to sign up. This was possibly due in part to the growing reputations for “social interaction”, frivolity and camaraderie that were emanating from the Rugby base at “the Royal Hoopers” Woonona.

== Early Days ==
The Woonona Shamrocks first playing strip was donated to the club by stalwart Jack Ryan and was a white jumper with a green saddle. The inaugural season was marked by the rare feat of running last in each of the three grades, with the only competition points coming from a drawn game in “C” Grade against Vikings. Each foundation player had the distinction of being presented with an engraved wooden spoon as a memento of their first season as a Shammie.

The shortage of players helped instill an ethos “to compete”, often traveling away with only 20 players or so to fill the three grades. Players doubled up, or even played on when injured, helping to develop an in-ground toughness and spirit that was to become a hallmark of the club. Hoopers Hotel remained the spiritual home after games, after training and after anything else, and this extra-curricular training enabled the club to build an enviable record in post-match “boat-racing” – a tradition that continues to this very day. Brown Muscat became a traditional drink of the club at halftime of each game and became known as “Shamrock Champagne”.

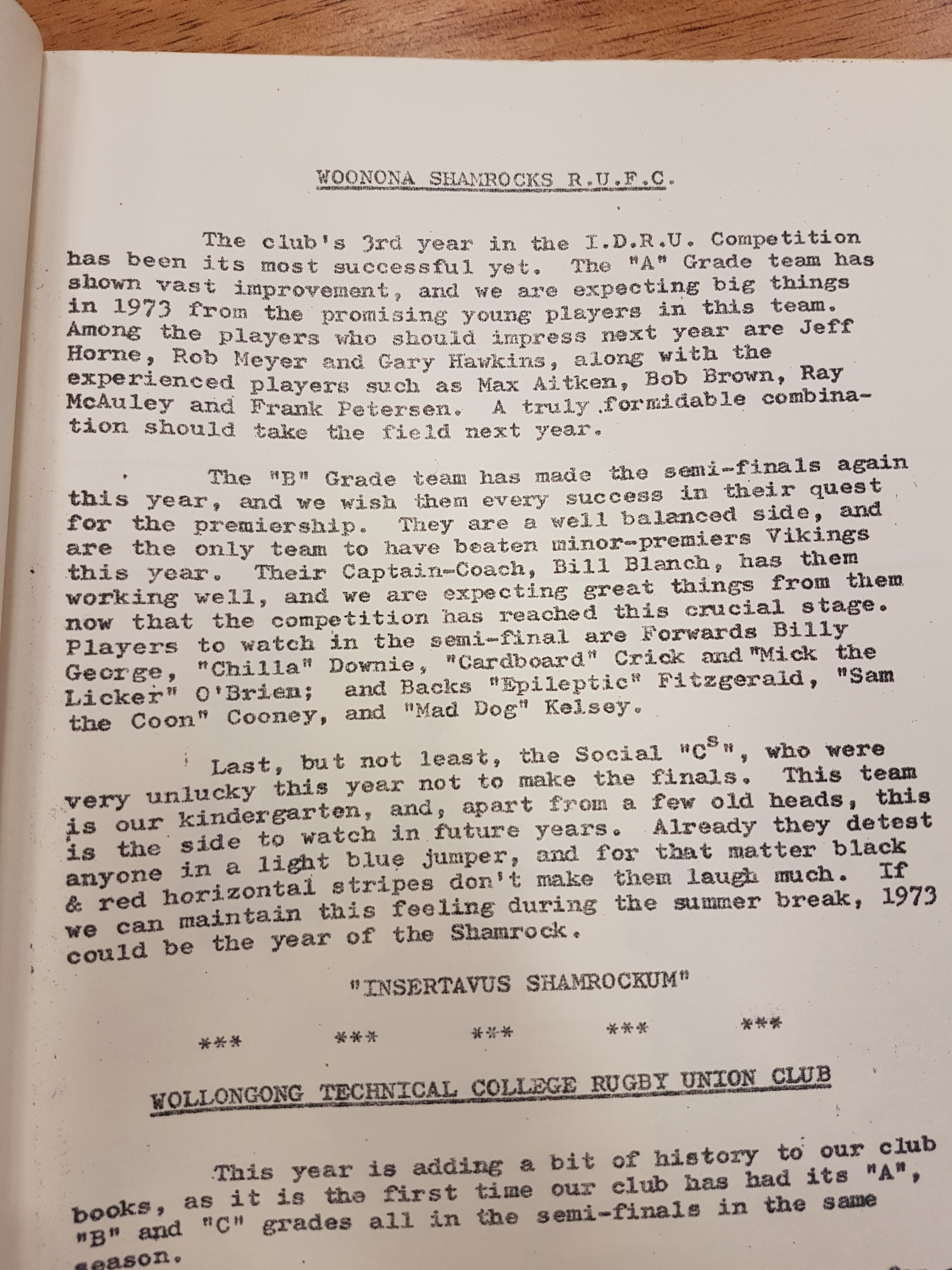
A yearly report from the early days of the club to the Illawarra Rugby Union Magazine

1978

The club experienced increased player participation and administrative changes during this season. Former Wallaby Barry Stumbles joined the club as a player and coach. The A Grade team finished second in the regular season, while the B and C Grade teams both won their minor premierships. These results placed the club second overall in the Club Championship. All three groups advanced through the major semi-finals to reach the Grand Finals, which included victories over the Vikings in both A and B Grades.

1979

Shamrocks ‘A’ Grade Premiers –knocked off Vikings 4-0 in a Grand Final. The Shamrocks came second in the Club Championship, finishing the preliminary rounds in 3rd place for ‘A’ Grade, 2nd place for Seconds and 5th place for Thirds. The B Grade team went down to Vikings in their Grand Final for the second successive year. All this followed a tour to the US by 28 or so Shamrocks, playing nine games in California and Arizona including the San Diego Rugby Tournament. Winning more games than they lost, the Shamrocks introduced their hosts, the LA Unicorns, to Aussie style partying and playing with a hangover. The club farewelled coach Barry Stumbles, who returned to St George RUFC. Bruce Fergusson became the first ‘A’ player to reach the 200 grade game milestone. After these two years, the club was seen as a competitive and a legitimate rival to verse within the Illawarra Rugby Competition.

== Current Era ==
Today the Shamrocks as a club comprises a membership and supporter base of well over 600 people. The club fields teams in the Illawarra District Rugby Union Competition in NSW Australia. There are several junior sides from U/7's through to U/17's as well as three senior grade sides. The club is also a pathway to be selected in the Illawarra Rugby and NSW Country representative teams. The club celebrated their 50th anniversary in 2019. The club's website is https://www.shamrocksrugby.com.au/, providing details on how to join and game details.

== Club song ==
The three men behind the club song were, Keith “Mickey” Roney, Keith “Sluggo” Walker and Jack “Tracker” Woods. Woods suggested a tune that was used by the 3rd Royal Australian Regiment (entitled “We’re a pack of Bastards”). Reputedly, on the stools of the Royal Hoopers, with the help of the amber fluid, the words of this military ditty were rearranged to become the ‘A’ verse of the anthem.

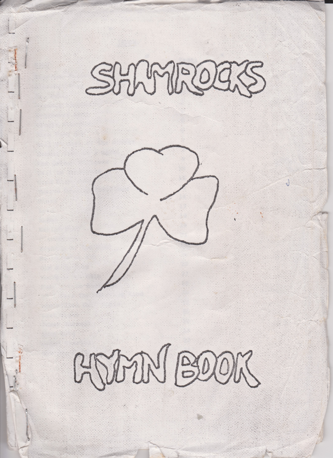
The Shamrocks Hymn Book was compiled to help support the choir at post-match partying and associated club coach trips and tours.

The tune used for the ‘A’ verse came from the second part (aka “strain”) of a popular American marching tune called “Our Director” penned by Frederick Ellsworth Bigelow (1873-1929). This tune is also shared by many American high school teams and other military units and organizations and is known as their “fight” song. The second verse of the Shamrocks song was suggested by Mickey Roneys and is a different tune of the Toreador song from Georges Bizet's famous opera Carmen. Again, the need to ‘Fight’ is highlighted and has become an intrinsic part of the Shamrock RUFC ethos.
