= Michael Jenkinson =

- Full name: Michael Augustine Jenkinson
- Born: 28 August 1940 Sydney, NSW, Australia
- Died: 18 June 2022 (aged 81)
- Height: 178 cm (5 ft 10 in)
- Weight: 76 kg (168 lb)

Rugby union career
- Position: Hooker
International career
Years	Team	Apps	(Points)
1963	Australia		

Michael Augustine Jenkinson (28 August 1940 – 18 June 2022) was an Australian international rugby union player.

Jenkinson was born in Sydney and attended Marcellin College. Restricted to rugby league at school, Jenkinson developed his rugby union with Vaucluse Juniors. He got his start in first grade rugby with Eastern Suburbs.

A journalist, Jenkinson moved to Newcastle in 1962 to act as northern correspondent for the Sydney Sun.

Jenkinson was playing for Newcastle club Wanderers when he gained an international call up for the Wallabies' 1963 tour of South Africa, where he featured in eight matches of a possible 24, but did not play against the Springboks.

Post rugby, Jenkinson became a published author. He ghost wrote a book by Steve Finnane in 1978 entitled The Game They Play in Heaven and later authored a biography on Phil Hawthorne.

== See also ==
- List of Australia national rugby union players
