= Inverell Times =

The Inverell Times was an English language newspaper published in Inverell, New South Wales, Australia. It absorbed the Inverell Argus in 1925. It was owned by Australian Community Media. It ceased publication in 2024 due to a drop in revenue, combined with rapidly rising costs, making the newspaper unsustainable. The Inverell Times website remains online with some local news and articles from The Northern Daily Leader.

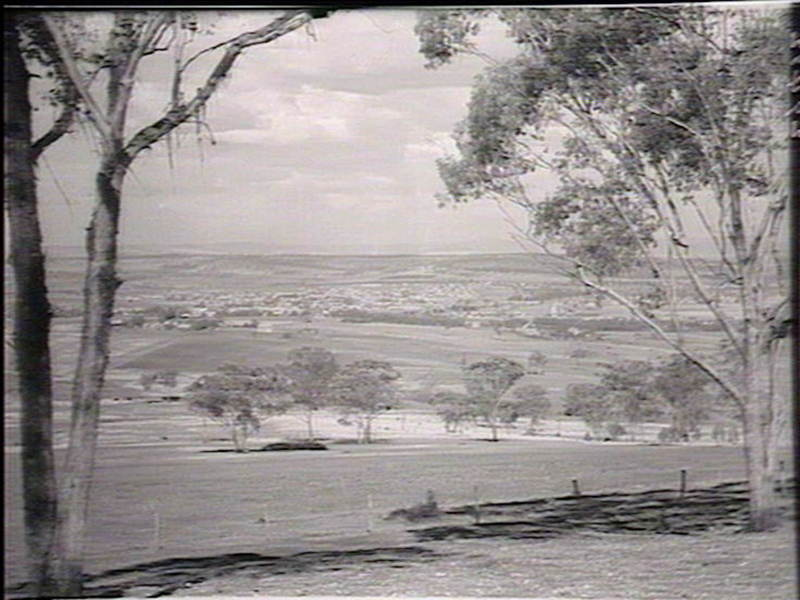
View of the town of Inverell

== History ==
The Inverell Times was established on 12 June 1875 by Thomas Harland, a former school teacher, and Colin Ross. Kate Bond was proprietor of the paper for eight years after the death of her husband, William Henry Bond, in 1895.

In September 2024, Australian Community Media announced it will shutter the paper.

== See also ==
- List of newspapers in Australia
- List of newspapers in New South Wales
