= Merewether Carlton Rugby Club =

Australian rugby union club, based in Newcastle, NSW

- Union: Newcastle and Hunter Rugby Union
- Nickname(s): Greens, Slime, Greens Legends
- Founded: 1930; 96 years ago
- Location: Merewether, Australia
- Region: Newcastle
- Ground: Townson Oval
Team kit

Official website
- www.merewethercarlton.com.au

Merewether Carlton Rugby Club, also known as The Greens, is a rugby union club based in the Newcastle, NSW region of Australia. They play in the Newcastle and Hunter Rugby Union’s Premier Competition, as well as fielding teams in other senior and junior NHRU competitions.

The club was formed in 1930 from the amalgamation of Cooks Hill Carlton and Cooks Hill Surf club. Cooks Hill Carlton was established in 1887, making it one of the oldest clubs in Australia.

Merewether Carlton has been one of the most successful clubs in the competition, winning more Club Championships and First Grade Premierships than any other club. Currently they field five senior teams, a colts (under 20) team, a women’s team and junior teams from under 8s to under 18s. The club has produced one Wallaby, Neil "Noodles" Adams, as well as many NSW and NSW Country Representatives.

Their home ground is Townson Oval in Merewether, while the club also uses Gibbs Bros Oval and Empire Park for home games and training.

== Colours and logo ==
The club colours are bottle green and white. For the first two years the jersey was sky blue with a Waratah emblem until the NSWRU requested a change. Bottle Green was then chosen.

In the 1980s, the Merewether Carlton Rugby Club adopted the crest of the Merewether family, the original settlers of the Merewether area. The original grant of the land that is now known as Gibbs Bros Oval was made to Mr Edward C Merewether in 1863. The crest carries the Latin motto Vi Et Consilio, which translates to with strength and wisdom.

== First Grade Premierships ==
Years Won
1932	1933	1934	1936	1938	1939	1941	1944	1947	1958	1973	1974 (drawn w/Maitland)	1979 (drawn w/The Waratahs)	1980	1989	2007	2011	2022

== Club Champions ==
Years Won
1946	1947	1954	1955	1956	1957	1967	1969	1972	1973	1974	1976	1979 (drawn w/The Waratahs)	1996	2005	2006	2007	2008	2009	2010	2011
