= Muirfield (disambiguation) =

Muirfield is an Open Championship golf course in Gullane, East Lothian, Scotland.

Muirfield may also refer to:

- Muirfield Village, an upscale golf course residential community in Ohio
- Muirfield Seamount, a submarine archipelago in the Indian Ocean that is a hazard to navigation
- Muirfield High School, a secondary school in New South Wales, Australia
- Muirfield, an evil secret organization in Beauty & the Beast
