= Girrahween =

Historic house in North Parramatta

- Location within Sydney Location within Australia
- 33.8025°S 151.0088°E
- Location: 14 Isabella Street, Parramatta, Sydney, New South Wales, Australia

History
- Built: 1870–1874

New South Wales Heritage Register
- Official name: Girrahween
- Type: state heritage (complex / group)
- Designated: 8 March 2002
- Reference no.: I383

Girrahween is a heritage-listed Victorian-style mansion and now offices at 14 Isabella Street, North Parramatta, Sydney, New South Wales, Australia. It resides in the City of Parramatta local government area of New South Wales, Australia. Originally built in 1874, the property was added to the New South Wales Heritage Register on 8 March 2002.

== History ==
Built circa 1874 as a pair of semi-detached houses, though altered to be a single dwelling circa 1884. The building is believed to have been built by Jabez Lavor. National Trust (Parramatta Branch): Three building lots were sold to Patrick Hayes in 1871 which all faced Sorrell Street. The house is built from local Hawkesbury sandstone laid in large blocks as two semi detached residences. In 1887, the whole property was sold to William Sonter, a farmer.

== Description ==
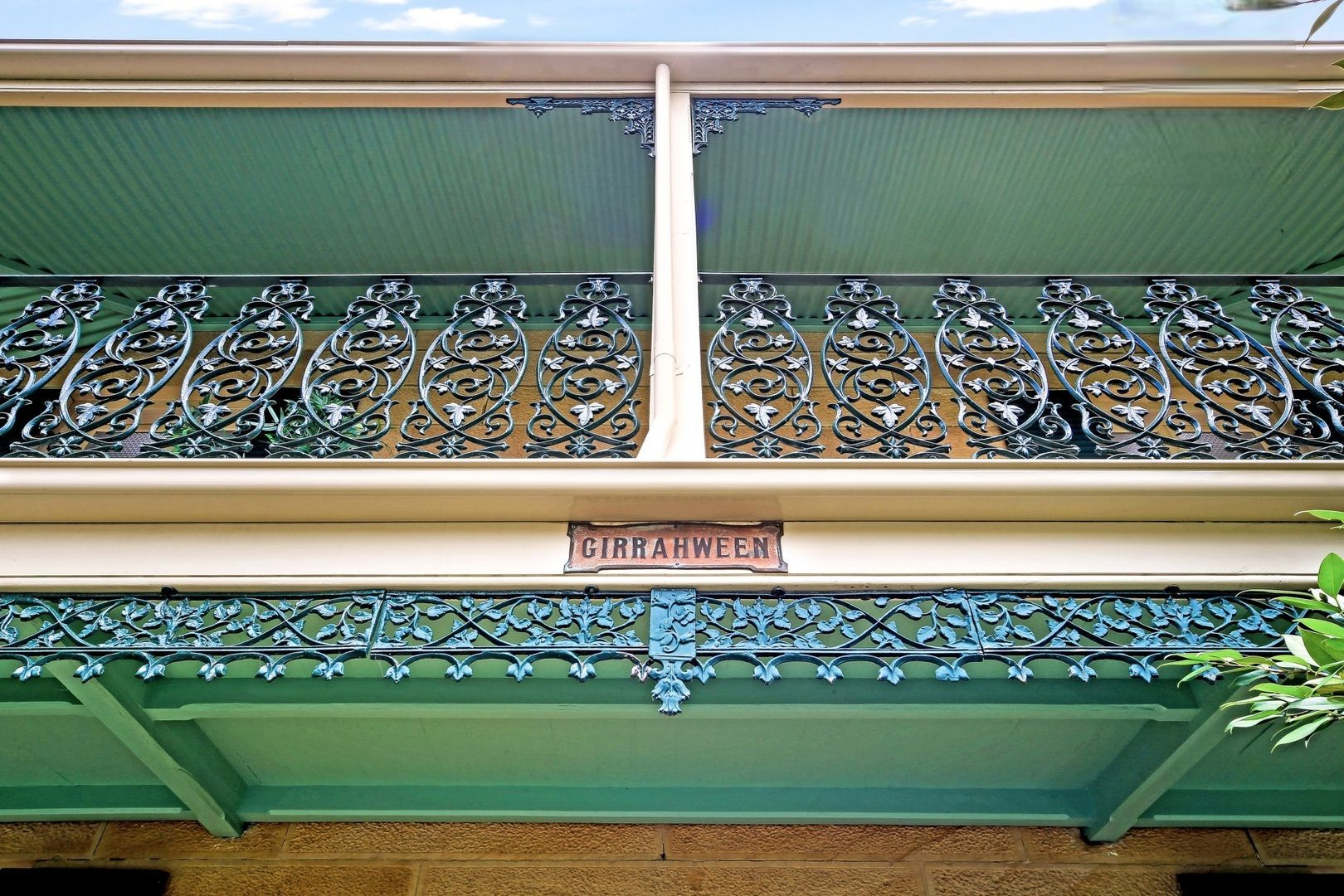
The Girrahween house sign.

Located within the North Parramatta Historic Interface Area, north of the Parramatta River. The Interface area is centred along Church Street, extending from the Parramatta River in the south to Isabella Street in the north. The North Parramatta Interface Area contains a number of important heritage items and overlaps the North Parramatta HCA to the west and Sorrell Street HCA to the East.

Originally built as a pair of semi-detached residences, this large two storey mid-Victorian sandstone house has pyramidal corrugated iron roof. Stone blocks in ashlar courses to front wall are larger, lighter and more carefully dressed and laid than in other walls. The verandah is two storeys across the street facade with single storey returns along the side walls, with roofs of concave corrugated iron. The verandah across front (two floor portion) has hip corners and Corinthian cast iron columns (on ground floor; the upper floor timber posts are presumedly modern replacements). All areas of the verandah have floor with sandstone edges and concrete infill on ground floor and timber construction of the first floor. Cast iron lace balustrade is on first floor verandah only. Cast iron frieze around fascia of ground floor verandah. Property fence is two-tiered spearhead iron palisade on stone base with stone corner posts.

There are two central brick chimneys front and rear of ridge line with octagonal glazed terracotta pots made by Lucas Field, and a tall sandstone chimney at rear over kitchen. Windows have sandstone cornice sills with brackets below. Exterior doors on the front elevation are two sets of French doors with transom lights, with bolection mould panels below the lock rail and glazed panels above lock rail on both floors.

Additions include skillions at rear, containing laundry and kitchen one side, bathroom the other. There are also two original front doors, one either side of the building, with transom light above timber two-panel doors with round tops. Other significant features include the black bean tree at the rear and sandstone gutters along Isabella Street.

== See also ==
- Australian residential architectural styles
