= North Rocks =

Suburb of western Sydney, Australia

- Suburb
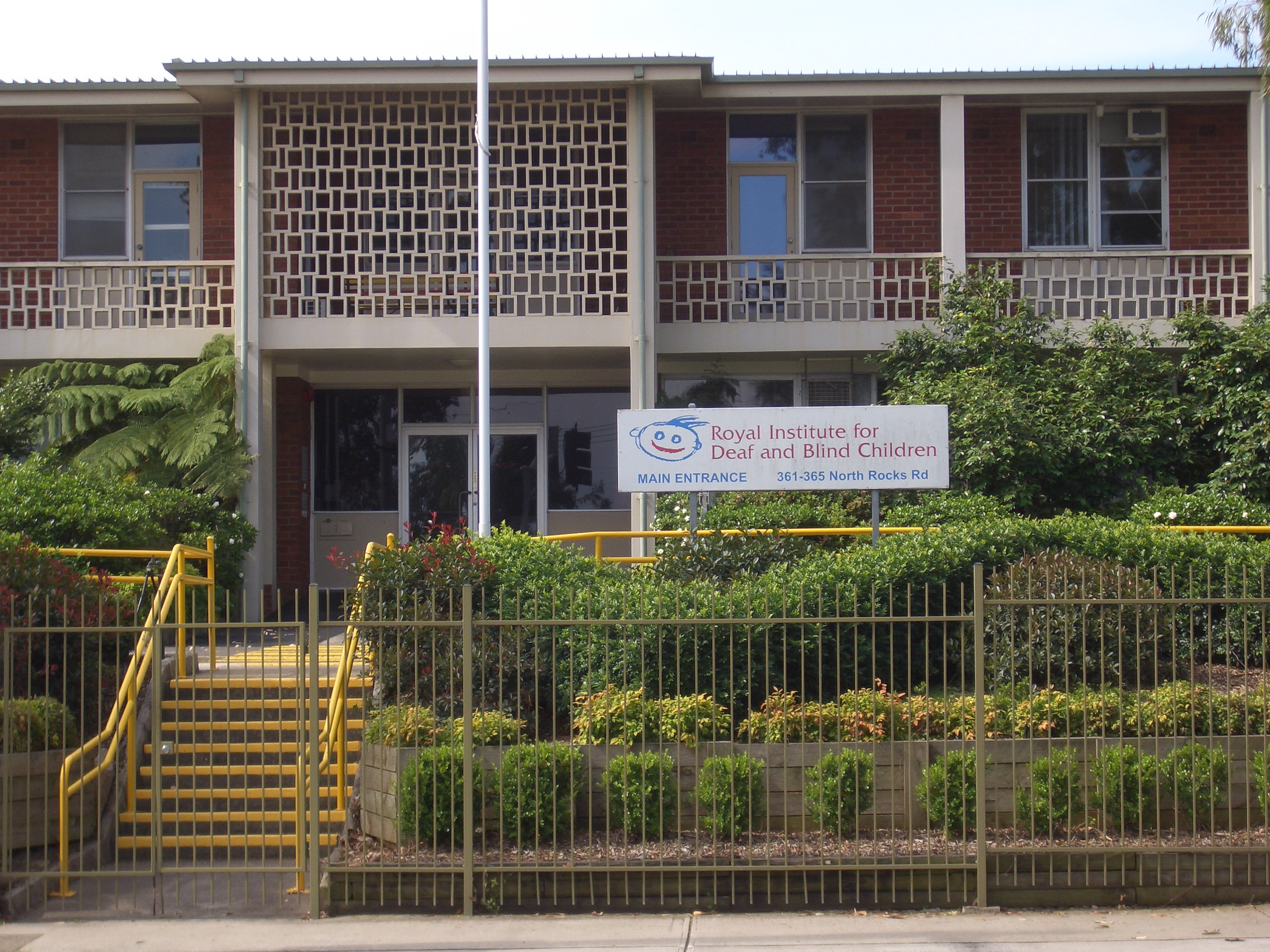
- Royal Institute for Deaf and Blind Children c. 2007

- Interactive map of North Rocks
- Country: Australia
- State: New South Wales
- City: Greater Western Sydney
- LGAs: City of Parramatta; The Hills Shire
- Location: 26 km (16 mi) north-west of Sydney CBD

Government
  - State electorate: Epping
  - Federal divisions: Berowra; Mitchell; Parramatta
- Elevation: 112 m (367 ft)

Population
  - Total: 9,136 (2021 census)
- Postcode: 2151
Suburbs around North Rocks
Baulkham Hills	West Pennant Hills	West Pennant Hills
Northmead	North Rocks	Carlingford
Northmead	North Parramatta	Oatlands

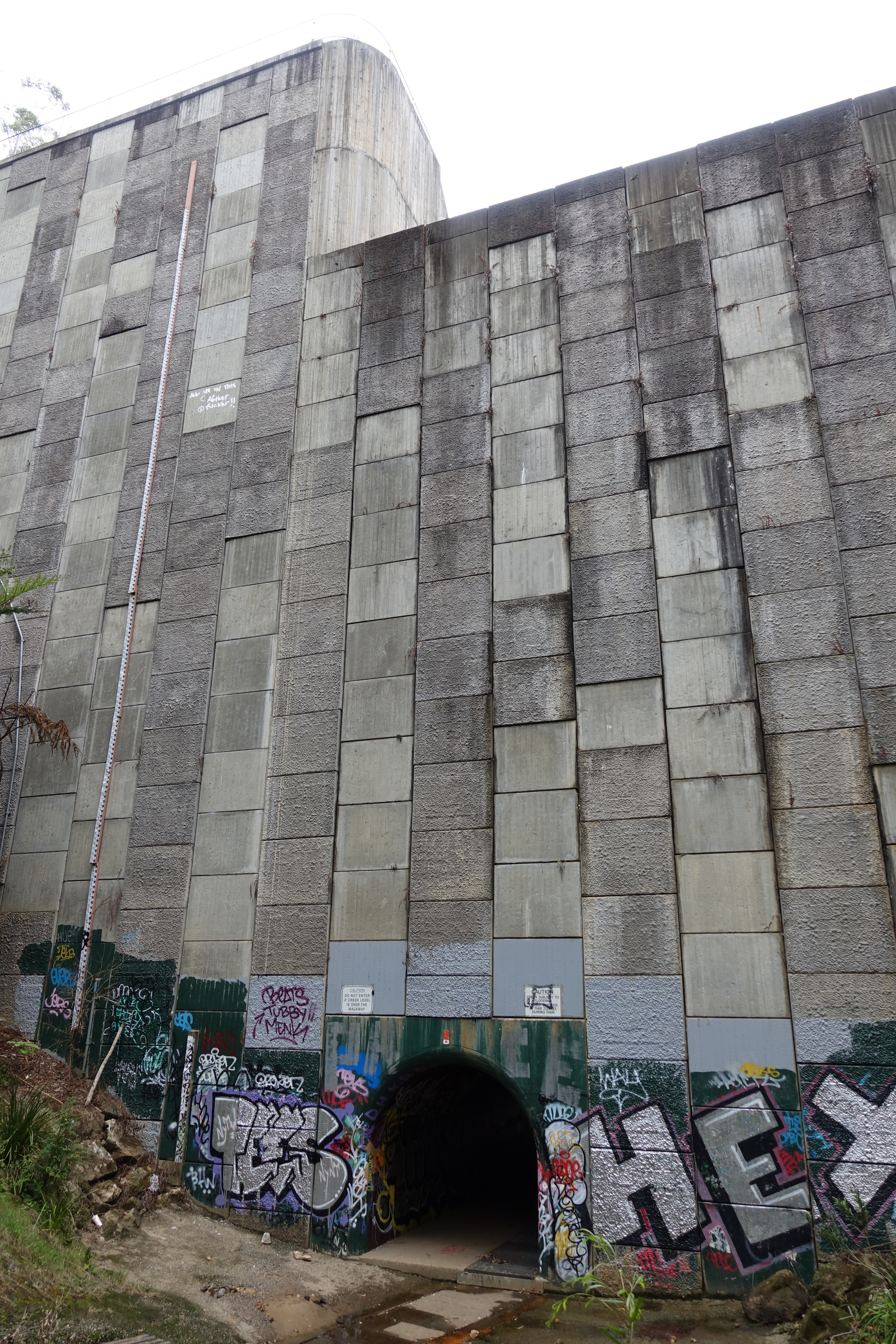
Colloquially known as the North Rocks Dam, off Rifle Range Road, about 30m in height. Not officially a dam, but a retarding basin wall.

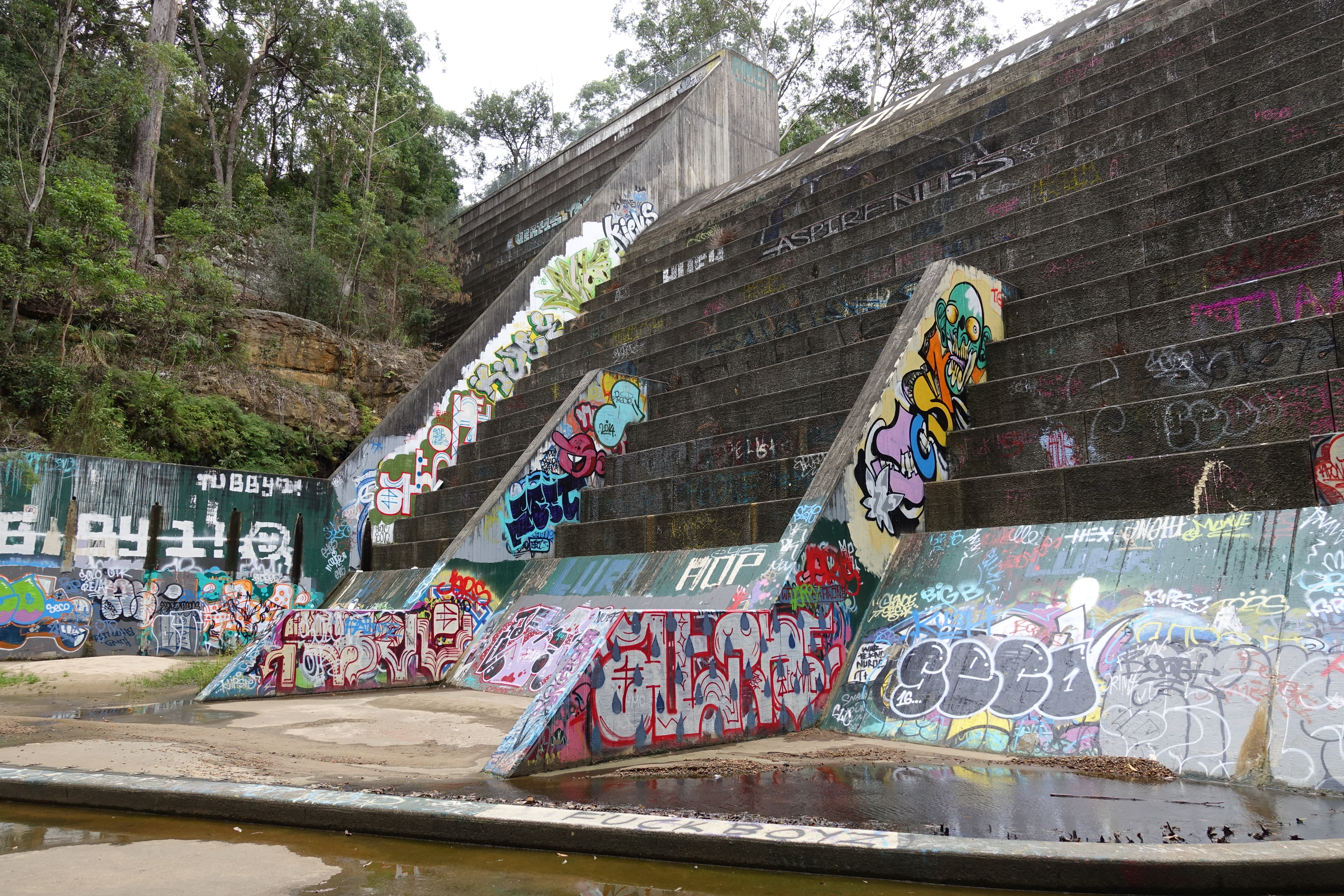
Rear of the North Rocks Dam Wall, about 30m in height.

North Rocks is a suburb straddling the Hills District and the North Shore of Parramatta within Greater Western Sydney, in the state of New South Wales, Australia, located 26 kilometres (16 mi) north-west of the Sydney central business district. Following the amalgamation of council areas in 2016, the majority of North Rocks falls into the council area of the City of Parramatta. Streets north of the M2 Hills Motorway are within The Hills Shire.

== History ==
The name North Rocks dates back to the beginning of the settlement at Parramatta and is older even than the name of the city itself, which at first was called Rosehill. In 1789 Governor Phillip reserved large areas to the north and west of Rosehill for the use of Government stock - the present Northmead and Westmead. The reserve to the north was described as extending as far as 'the North Rocks'. The area was also known as Jerusalem Rocks.

North Rocks (Hunts and Darling Mills Creeks) was originally occupied by the Burramattagal clan (burra - eels and fish, matta – place of fresh running water) who were part of the Darug nation.

North Rocks was once considered as the haunt of convict bolters and bushrangers and regarded as an unsavoury area. One noted incident was the hold-up of Dr Sherwin in 1830 by John Macnamara and William Dalton, which resulted in the ex-convicts' demise. The North Rocks were a massive sandstone outcrop, which terminated the ridge on the south side of Hunts Creek. These rocks so dominated the landscape and were such prominent features that they gave their name to the locality but were not preserved. In 1841 when it was decided to build a new gaol at Parramatta, a contractor bought the Rocks as they consisted of the best sandstone in the district - and were very conveniently situated. His tender was accepted, and much of the North Rocks became gaol walls and flagstones in 1844. Further inroads were made on what was left when the wall of masonry was erected in 1855-56 which held back the waters of Lake Parramatta. Much stone was needed for the dam, as the wall is about 240 feet (73 m) long and is fifteen feet thick at the base.

A North Rocks Post Office first opened on 1 February 1894; it was renamed Forrester later that year, Maraylya in 1921 and closed in 1970. The current Post Office opened on 1 November 1921.

Prior to North Rocks being rezoned around 1958, it housed around 40 farms, including peach and nectarine orchards, poultry farms and piggeries. When the area was rezoned, one of many new housing estates was named Lynwood Estate.

North Rocks came to public attention on 21 July 2023, when a wild car chase lasting almost an hour came to an end as a Hyundai Sonata displaying Queensland number plates crashed into a set of traffic lights. One driver and a passenger were soon taken into custody by police officers.

== Commercial area ==
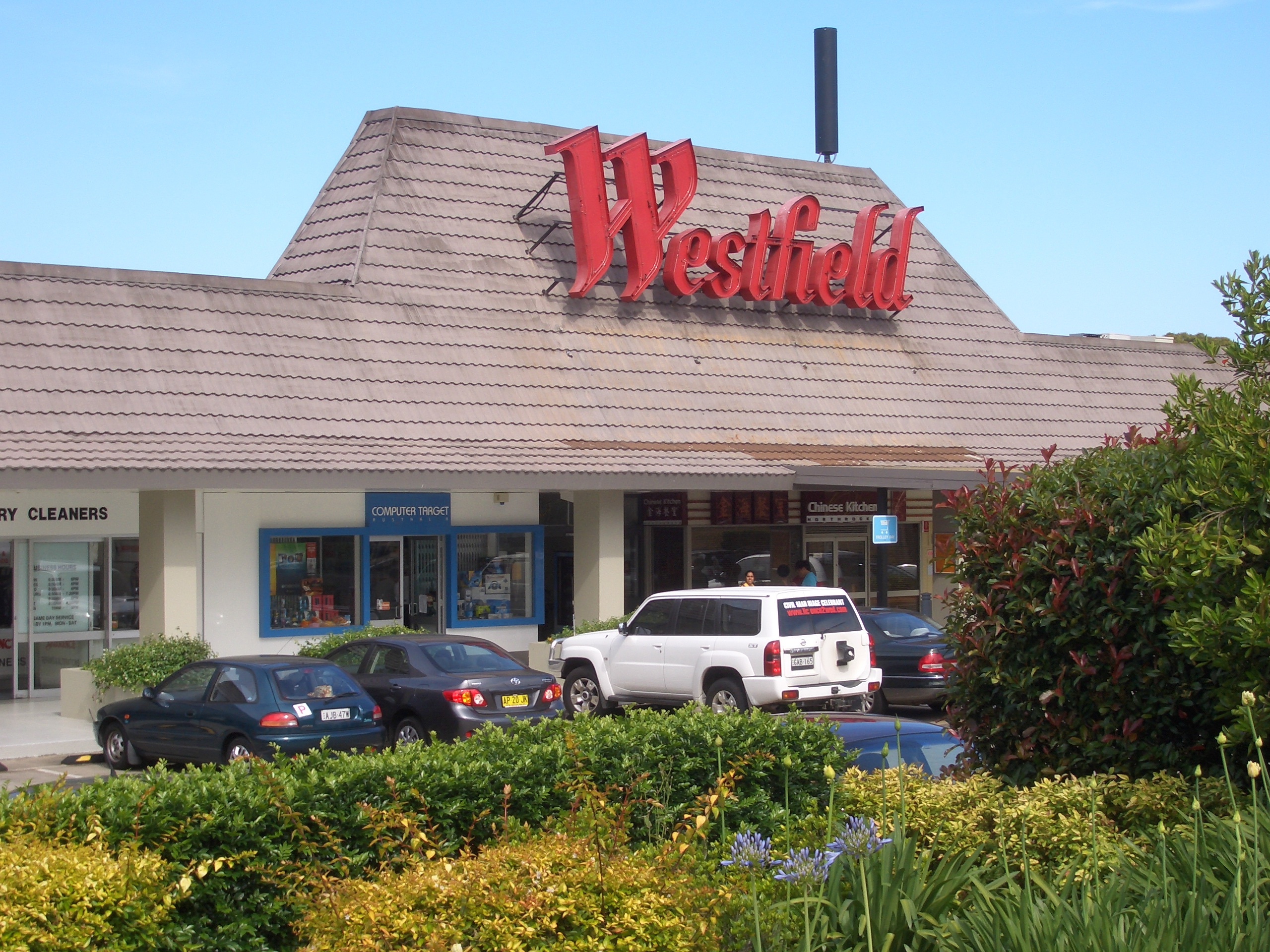
North Rocks Shopping Centre (prior to rebranding)

North Rocks Shopping Centre and the Royal Institute for Deaf and Blind Children school are located around North Rocks Road. The shopping centre was constructed during the 1970s and features a Coles Supermarket and Kmart discount department store and more than 70 speciality shops. It was a Westfield Group operation until 2015, when it was sold to Challenger for $127 million. A small group of shops is also located on the opposite side, around the intersection of North Rocks Road and Lawndale Avenue.

North Rocks Markets, a trash and treasure market, is run every Sunday by the local Rotary Club by gold coin donation at the Royal Institute for Deaf and Blind Children. The market incorporates a variety of stalls covering new and second-hand items, food, and a computer market and has operated at various locations in the area over 20 years.

There is a light industrial area towards North Parramatta in the area around Loyalty Road, which includes industrial businesses such as Unilever, Rexona and Officeworks and many other businesses in various industrial estates.

== Representation ==
=== Federal Divisions ===
Federal Representation
Divisions	Member	Party
Parramatta	Dr. Andrew Charlton	Australian Labor Party
Mitchell	Alex Hawke	Liberal Party of Australia

=== State Electoral Districts ===
State Representation
Electoral Districts	Member	Party
Epping	Monica Tudehope	Liberal Party of Australia
Winston Hills*	Mark Taylor	Liberal Party of Australia

*While the boundaries of the Winston Hills electorate includes North Rocks, it has no electors

=== Local Government ===
Council Representation
Councils	Ward(s)	Councillors (in order of election)	Party (in order of election)
Parramatta City Council	North Rocks Ward	1. Hayley French; 2. Georgina Valjak; 3. Manning Jeffrey	1. Australian Labor Party; 2. Liberal Party of Australia; 3. Liberal Party of Australia
The Hills Shire Council	East Ward	1. Samuel Uno; 2. Alan Haselden; 3. Jane Grevtseva	1. Liberal Party of Australia; 2. Liberal Party of Australia; 3. Australian Labor Party

== Transport ==
At the 2016 census, only 16.8% of employed people travelled to work on public transport and 69.1% by car (either as a driver or as a passenger).

The M2 Hills Motorway runs through North Rocks, and there is access to the motorway from Barclay Road in North Rocks, Pennant Hills Road in Carlingford and Windsor Road in Baulkham Hills. Public transport to, from and throughout the area is provided by bus.

=== Train ===
North Rocks does not have a railway station. However, train services are accessible from nearby Epping (accessed by the 549, 546 and 630 bus routes), Castle Hill and Parramatta (accessed by the 549 and 546 bus routes) railway stations.

=== Bus ===
The Barclay Road M2 Bus Station provides services to the City and Castle Hill as well as services to Macquarie Park, Blacktown and Norwest Business Park. The Barclay Road M2 bus to the city takes 22 minutes. Sydney Buses provides links from Parramatta railway station to Epping railway station through different parts of North Rocks, although both converge at North Rocks Shopping Centre. There are also very limited services to Beecroft railway station.

== Schools ==
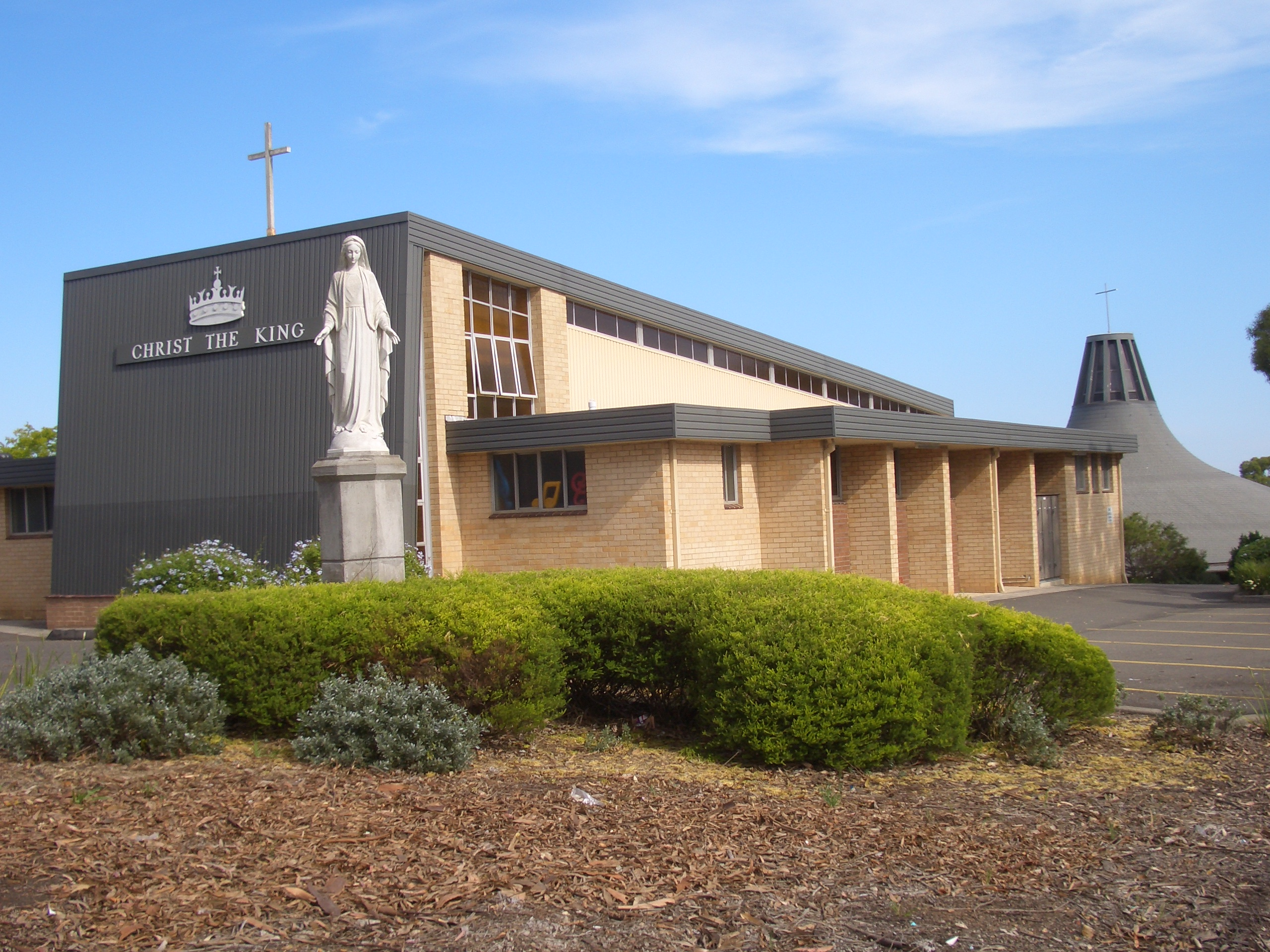
Christ the King School

=== Public ===
- North Rocks Public School (which has an Opportunity Class);
- Burnside Public School;
- Muirfield High School is a comparatively small high school with around 850 students. A defining feature of the school is its agricultural program run out of the Barclay farm. Muirfield has run an agricultural display at the Castle Hill Show since 1992. In 2006 the school won the award for Best School Display. Issues arising from drought resulted in the School withdrawing from the show in 2007. In 2010 Muirfield High School was invited to participate in the first Sydney Royal Easter Show Schools Fruit and Vegetable Display, where the school was awarded 2nd place.

=== Private ===
- Christ the King Catholic Primary School

=== Tertiary education ===
- United Theological College.

== Places of worship ==
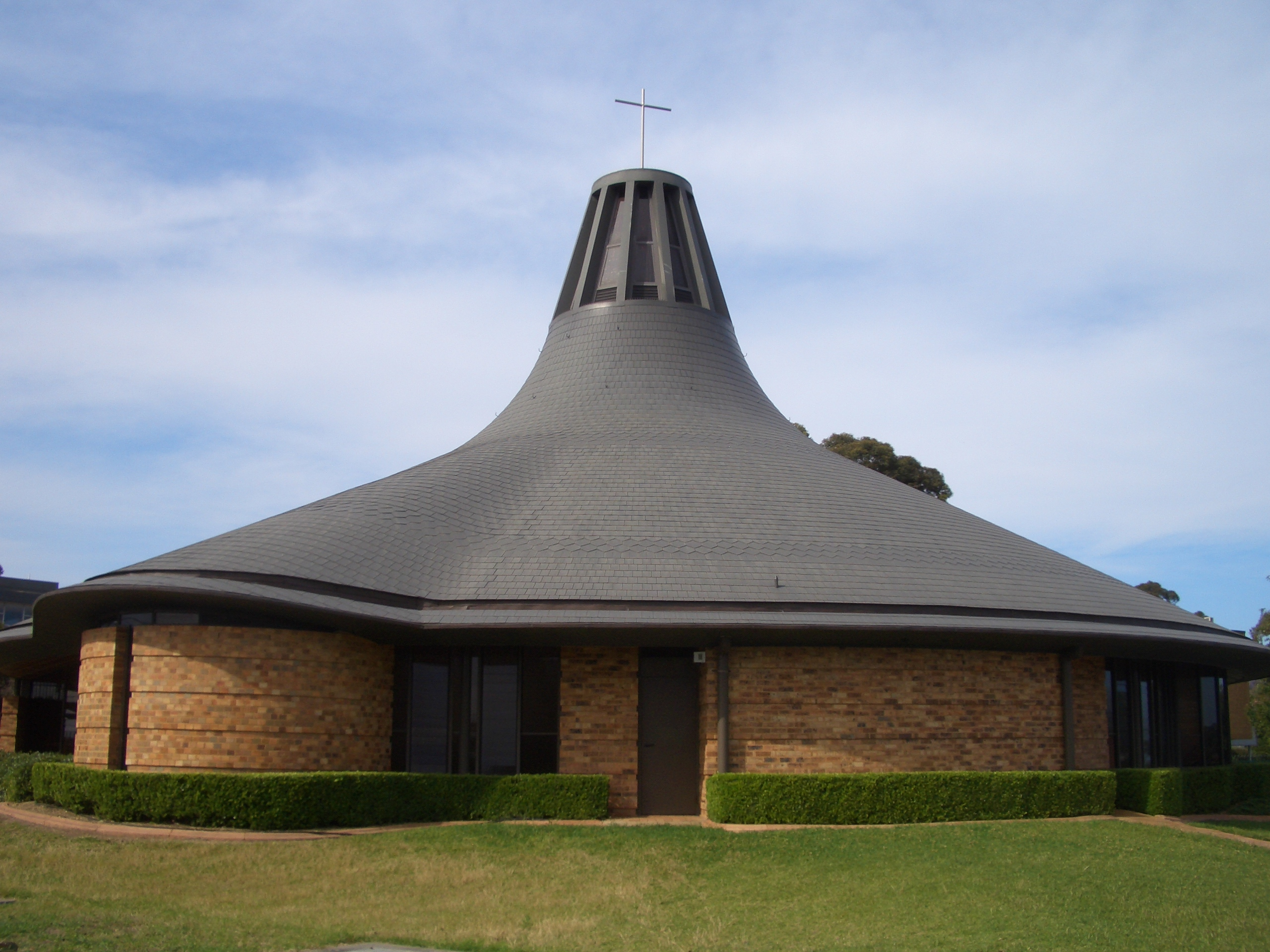
Christ the King Church

- Liberty Baptist Church
- North Rocks Anglican Church [Anglican Church]
- Christ the King [Catholic Church]
- North Rocks Community Church [Uniting Church]
- Sydney Saesoon Presbyterian Church

== Sport and recreation ==
Public services in the suburb include a number of large reserves, sporting facilities, a community centre, and a number of schools, and an active Rotary and Lions clubs as well as Scout & Girl Guide groups. North Rocks also boasts Muirfield Golf Club, a picturesque and parkland style 18-hole Golf Course and club facilities on Barclay Road. There are also local softball, soccer, rugby clubs and the Murri-Yanna Track in Bidjigal Reserve which can be accessed from Whitbread Place. North Rocks was also the host to the 1976 Skateboard Winter Olympics.

== Parks and reserves ==
North Rocks features a number of parks and reserves, such as Hunts Creek Reserve, which features Balaka Falls, a scenic waterfall. Bidjigal Reserve, which includes a towering eucalypt forest, weathered sandstone cliffs, sparkling creeks and sheltered rainforest gullies, surrounds the north and west periphery of the North Rocks border. Fauna includes koala, swamp wallaby, echidna, sugar gliders and eastern water dragon. Platypus were regularly seen up until the installation of the sewer in the mid-1970s, but none since. The diversity of birds is well known in Bidjigal Reserve with 127 species being documented. Rare insectivorous species such as wrens and thornbills have been recorded and the more common species of kookaburras and crimson rosellas seem to be doing well. In recent years, there has also been an increase in numbers of sulphur-crested cockatoos and rainbow lorikeets. The powerful owl, Australia's largest owl also breeds in the reserve and can be heard hooting throughout North Rocks at night. Many of these bird species can be seen throughout North Rocks.

== Demographics ==
The 2021 census conducted by the Australian Bureau of Statistics reports the population of North Rocks as 9,136 residents, with 4,477 males and 4,659 females. The demographic breakdowns show that:

Age distribution
North Rocks residents' median age was 40 years, compared to the national median of 38. Children aged 0–14 years made up 19.5% of the population (national average is 18.2%) and people aged 65 years and over made up 17.7% of the population (national average is 17.2%).
Ethnic diversity
56.1% of people were born in Australia. The most common countries of birth were China 10.8%, South Korea 3.7%, India 3.4%, England 2.2% and Iran 2.1%. The most common ancestries in North Rocks were Chinese 22.3%, Australian 21.5%, English 21.5%, Irish 6.9% and Scottish 6.6%. 54.4% of people only spoke English at home. Other languages spoken at home included Mandarin 12.4%, Cantonese 5.8%, Korean 5.0%, Arabic 2.2% and Persian (excluding Dari) 2.1%.
Religion
According to the 2021 Census, Christians accounted for 51.7% of the population, with Catholics accounting for 22.7%, Anglicans accounting for 10.5% and Presbyterian and Reformed accounting for 4.2%. People who had no religion constituted 33.0%. The largest non-Christian religion was Hinduism which constituted 4.3% of the population.
Income
The average weekly household income was $2,354, compared to the national average of $1,746.
Housing
The majority (78.1%) of private dwellings were separate houses; another 7.8% were semi-detached (townhouses etc.), and 14.1% were flats, units or apartments. Most are either owned outright (35.6%) or owned with a mortgage (39.0%), while 23.8% were rented. The average household size was 2.9 people.
