= Darling Mills Creek =

Coordinates: 33°44′56″S 151°02′49″E

Darling Mills
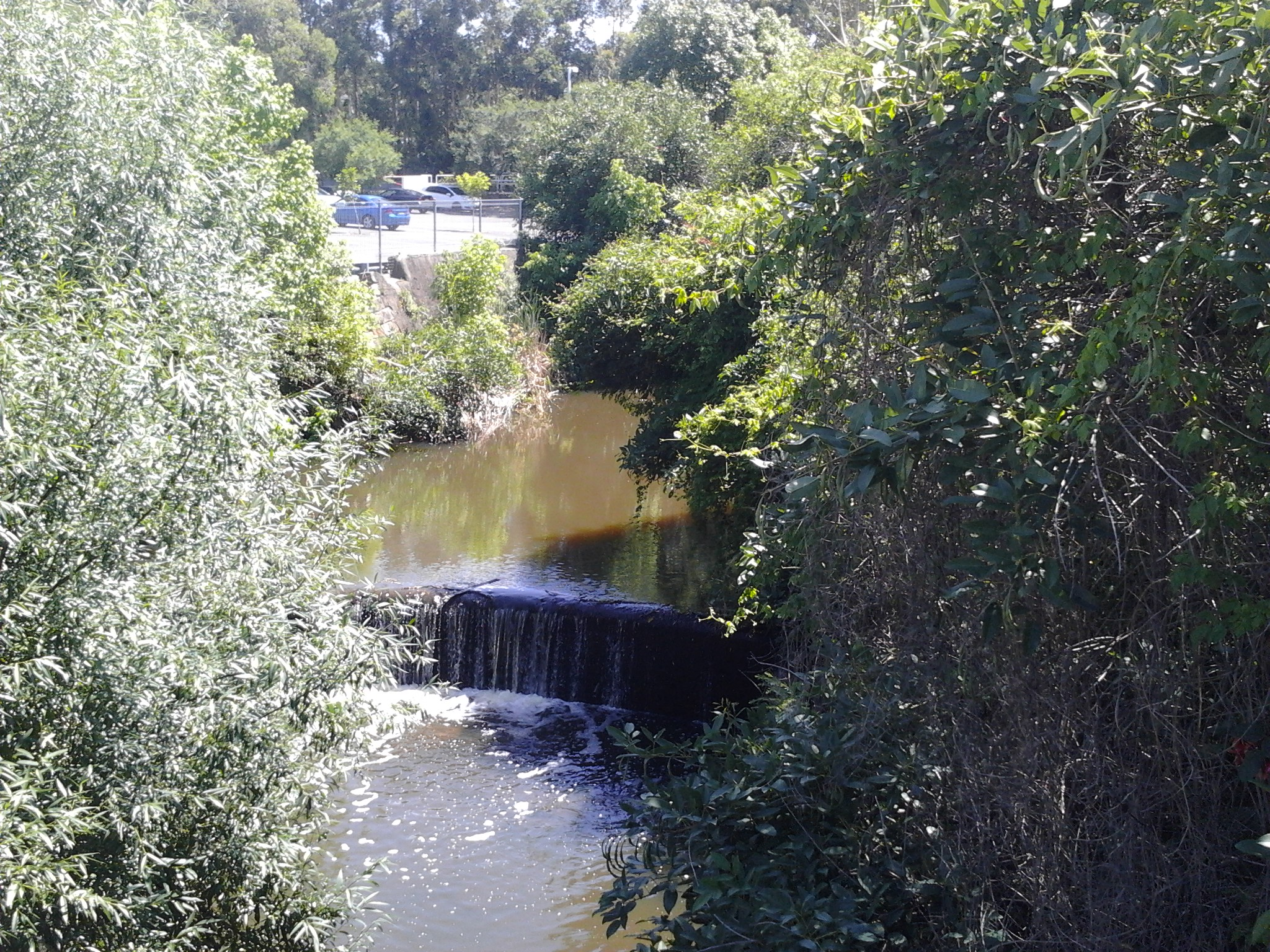
- Weir at the Darling Mills site, Windsor Road

Location
- Country: Australia
- State: New South Wales
- Region: Sydney Basin (IBRA), Greater Western Sydney
- Local government areas: The Hills, Parramatta

Physical characteristics
- Source: Thompsons Corner
  - location: West Pennant Hills
- Mouth: confluence with Toongabbie Creek to form the Parramatta River
  - location: North Parramatta
- Length: 10 km (6.2 mi)
- Basin size: 107 km^{2} (41 sq mi)

Basin features
- River system: Parramatta River catchment
- Tributaries
  - left: Bellbird Creek, Bidjigal Creek, Blue Gum Creek, Hunts Creek
  - right: Excelsior Creek, Sawmill Creek, Bellamy Farm Creek
- Nature reserves: Bidjigal; Munro; Eric Mobbs Recreation

The Darling Mills Creek, an urban watercourse that is part of the Parramatta River catchment, is located in Greater Western Sydney, New South Wales, Australia.

== Course and features ==
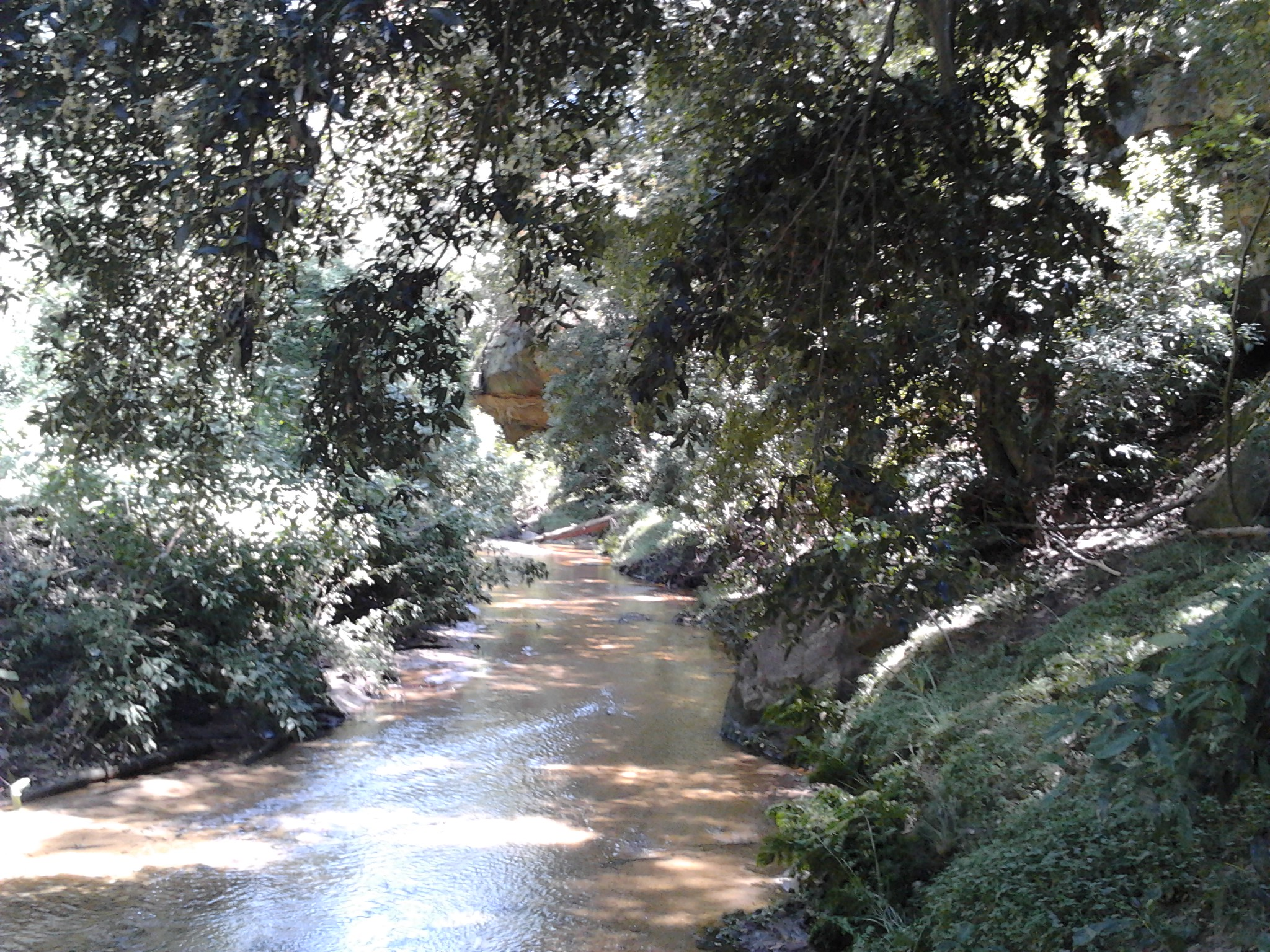
Darling Mills Creek near Northmead High School

The Darling Mills Creek rises in the north-western suburbs of Sydney, west of Thompsons Corner, near the intersection of Castle Hill Road and Pennant Hills Road, within the suburb of West Pennant Hills. The headwaters lie on the watershed between the Hornsby Plateau and the Cumberland Plain. The creek flows generally west, then south, joined by its tributaries including the Bidjigal, Sawmill, Excelsior, Blue Gum, Bellbird, Bellamy Farm creeks and the dammed Hunts Creek downstream of Lake Parramatta, before reaching its confluence with the Toongabbie Creek to form the Parramatta River, in the suburb of North Parramatta, in land adjoining the northern boundary of the Cumberland Hospital. The course of the creek is approximately 10 kilometres (6.2 mi); and the creek passes through the Cumberland State Forest, the Darling Mills State Forest, Bidjigal Reserve, Excelsior Park, and many smaller reserves and parks.

The Darling Mills Creek is transversed by the Cumberland Highway, the M2 Hills Motorway, and marks the boundary between Windsor Road and Church Street in North Parramatta.

== History ==
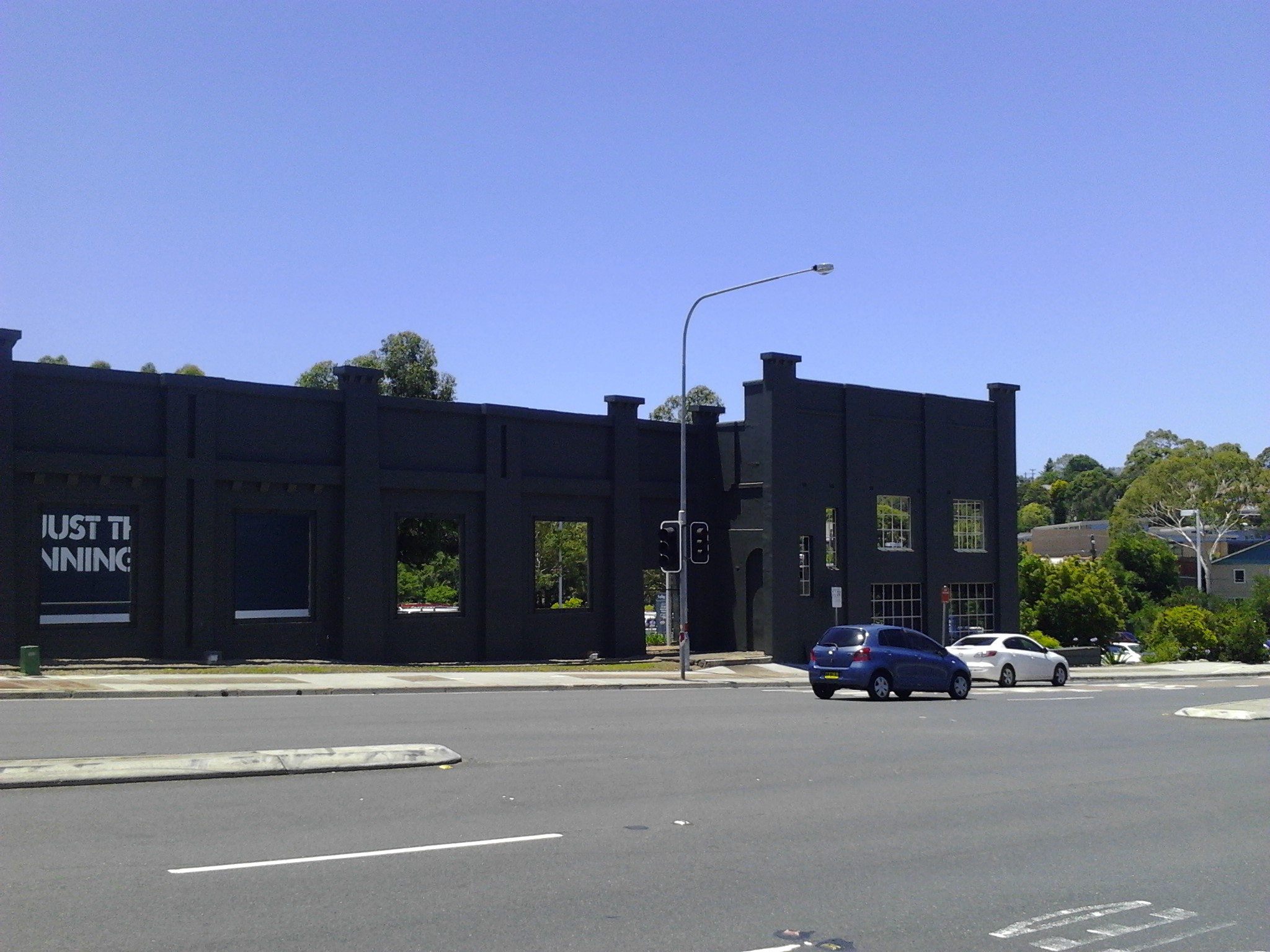
Facade of Sydney Woollen Mills

The land adjacent to the Parramatta River and its tributaries, including the Darling Mills Creek, was occupied for many thousands of years by the Burramattagal clan of the Darug people, Toongagal, Wallumattagal, Wangal, and Wategora Aboriginal peoples. They used the river as an important source of food and a place for trade.

The Darling Mills Creek takes its name from a watermill constructed a short distance from the confluence with Toongabbie Creek.

An earlier watermill was built by Samuel Marsden near the confluence. It milled flour from 1804 to 1818.

In 1825, the Darling Flour Mills were built for John Raine, upstream on the Windsor Road.

The Darling Mills site was taken over by Sydney Woollen Mills, which operated from 1870 to 1975. Sydney Woollen Mills originally used steam rather than water power. Part of the facade of the building remains on the site, which was occupied by Bunnings's North Parramatta store in the early 21st century. There is a weir on the creek nearby that was constructed in the nineteenth century.

== See also ==
- Great North Walk
- Rivers of New South Wales
