= Lake Parramatta =

Man-made reservoir in Sydney, Australia

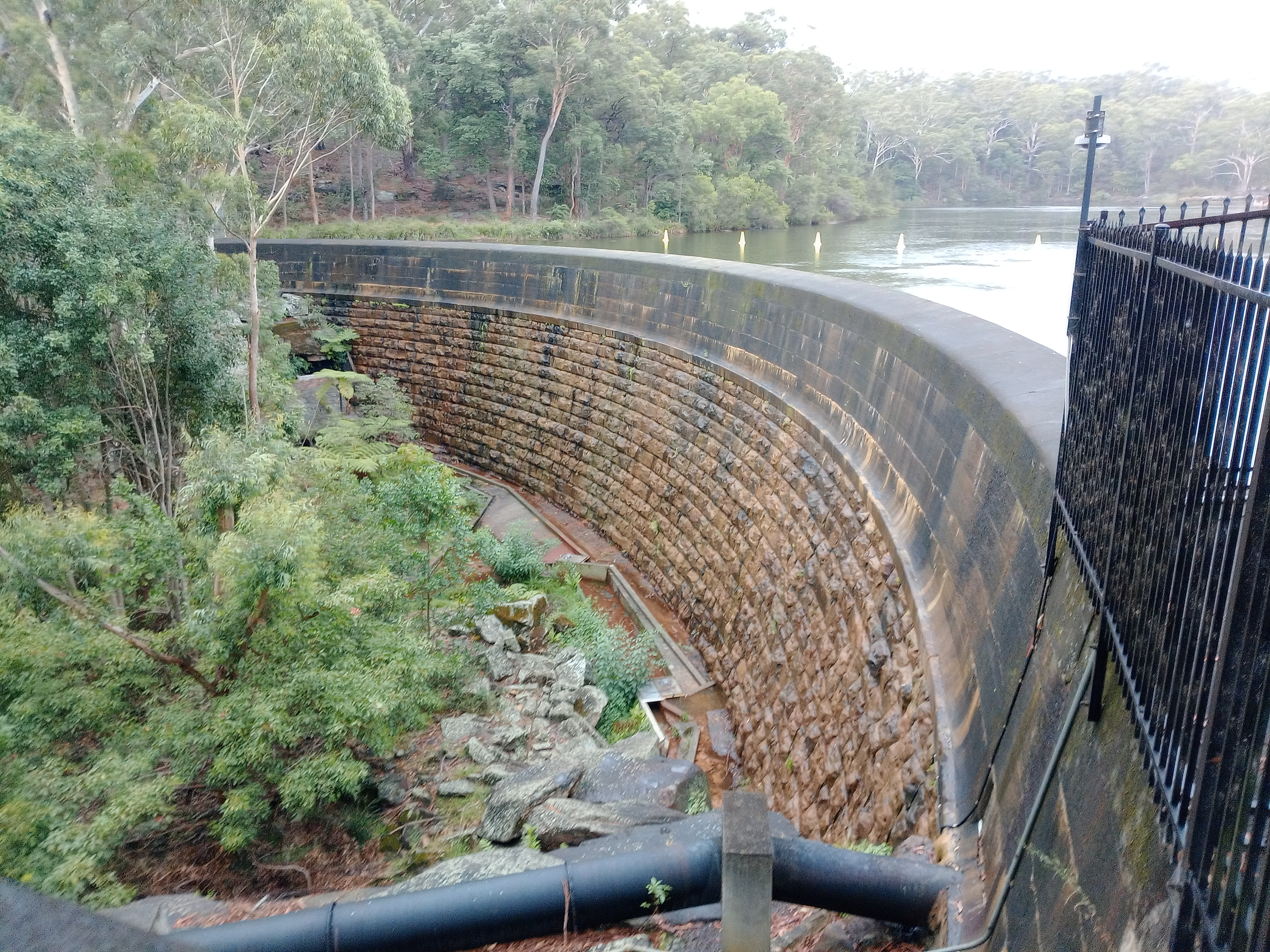
- The dam wall and part of the lake in January 2026

- Location of Lake Parramatta in Greater Sydney
- Country: Australia
- Location: North Parramatta, Sydney
- Coordinates: 33°47′24″S 151°00′27″E
- Purpose: Domestic
- Status: Decommissioned
- Construction began: 1855
- Opening date: September 1856
- Construction cost: £17,000
- Owner: City of Parramatta

Dam and spillways
- Type of dam: Arch dam
- Impounds: Hunts Creek
- Height: 15 m (49 ft)

Reservoir
- Creates: Lake Parramatta
- Total capacity: 485 ML (17.1×10^{6} cu ft)
- Active capacity: 450 ML (16×10^{6} cu ft)
- Catchment area: 8 km^{2} (3.1 sq mi)
- Surface area: 10.5 ha (26 acres)

Designations

New South Wales Heritage Register
- Official name: Lake Parramatta Dam
- Designated: 23 March 2012
- Reference no.: 01879

Lake Parramatta is a heritage-listed man-made reservoir and a recreational area located in North Parramatta, City of Parramatta, in the Western Sydney region of New South Wales, Australia. The masonry arch-walled dam across Hunts Creek was completed in 1856 to supply water for domestic purposes; and was operational until 1909. The dam has since been decommissioned and the lake and the surrounding nature reserve are a popular recreational area.

The precinct contains a 73-hectare (180-acre) nature reserve, the largest bushland remnant surviving in the Parramatta LGA. The 8-square-kilometre (3.1 sq mi) catchment area for Lake Parramatta is bounded by North Rocks Road, Pennant Hills Road and Hunts Creek. The height of the dam wall is 15 metres (49 ft) and it creates a lake with a maximum storage capacity of 485 megalitres (17.1×10^{6} cu ft), with a surface area of approximately 10.5 hectares (26 acres).

The dam was the twelfth engineered dam built since Roman times 100BC, the first in Australia, and the second arch built universally that involved calculations for its construction. Water from this dam was not reticulated until 1881 when it was required to augment the then dwindling water supply. The dam wall is listed on the New South Wales State Heritage Register in recognition of its significance relating to dam technology in Australia arch dams worldwide; and has an indicative listing on the Register of the National Estate. It was added to the New South Wales State Heritage Register on 23 March 2012.

On 5 December 2012 the Governor proclaimed Lake Parramatta Reserve as a 'Wildlife Refuge’ under Section 68 of the National Parks and Wildlife Act 1974. The proclamation was in recognition of the diversity of wildlife and threatened species which occur in the reserve. Swimming in Lake Parramatta was permitted between 1920 and 1940; and after a prolonged period of closure due to poor water quality, was reopened to the public in 2015. Entry to the reserve is from Lackey Street, North Parramatta.

== History ==
=== Indigenous use ===
The traditional custodians of the land surrounding Lake Parramatta are the Burramatagal and Bidjigal clans of the Darug people, an Aboriginal kinship group of Indigenous Australians. There is evidence of Aboriginal occupation within the boundaries of Lake Parramatta Reserve in the form of remnant shelters, hand stencils, flaking scars and deposits. It is possible that other sites were inundated with the construction of the dam in the 1850s.

The area was important to Aboriginal people because of the abundant fresh water and diverse range of food types. Records from 1804 exist of the Reserve's use as a pleasure ground, specifically around Hunts Creek.

=== Dam ===
From 1788 to 1909, Parramatta depended on the Parramatta River for its water supply. The history of public supply began in 1815 when a well was sunk for public use. In 1818 Governor Macquarie ordered a dam to be built across the Parramatta River. It was called the Town Dam and held about 30 million gallons of water (136 kL) which was delivered to houses and factories by privately operated water carts. This dam still stands near Lennox Bridge and retains the pond through Parramatta Park. A second dam was built near the present Cumberland Hospital in 1831.

Pollution and recurrent shortages led to agitation for a larger and purer supply. By 1847 the population had increased to 4500, and the government was asked to provide the district with a "full supply of pure and wholesome water". Unfortunately, due to other more pressing demands, the government was unable to comply. Agitation continued and two factions developed: one advocating a dam on Toongabbie Creek, the other favouring Hunts Creek. In 1849 a large public meeting of citizens petitioned the Governor for a grant of pounds sterling 3000 ($6000) to provide a wholesome water supply. A few weeks later the Legislative Council granted pounds sterling 1000 ($2000) to the citizens of Parramatta who were expected to find the other pounds sterling 2000 ($4000). The Government grant was later increased to pounds sterling 3000 ($6000).

A Committee of Water Commissioners (the Water Committee) comprising selected Parramatta citizens was appointed by the Governor to carry out the work. The debate over the site continued until the Surveyor General Sir Thomas Mitchell recommended the selection of Hunts Creek. Plans and specifications were prepared and in May 1851 the Water Committee approved the construction of a "circular" (arch) dam.

The tender of Mr John Stewart for this work was accepted but, after starting work, he withdrew from the contract, citing undue interference by the Water Committee. A second contractor failed and a third also withdrew from the task. The Water Committee reverted to the Toongabbie Scheme, and then resigned.

A new Water Committee changed back to Hunts Creek and had plans prepared by Captain Percy Simpson who was also appointed Engineer of Works. Later supervision of the work was handed over to Edward Orpen Moriarty, a civil engineer in private practice. In November 1853, the tender of W. Randle was accepted. Before dam construction could begin, it was necessary to cut and shape stones from the quarry and to excavate steps in the abutments to receive each course of masonry. By June 1855, sufficient work had been done for the first stone to be ceremoniously laid in the dam wall. This was done by James Pye. He was a member of both Water Committees and his support for the Hunts Creek Scheme had never wavered.

The contractor employed about 150 men and worked them on day and night shifts. By August 1855 the available funds had been expended and work was suspended. When more money was allocated the next year, work resumed and the dam was completed in September 1856, at a cost of about pounds sterling 17 000 ($34,000).

The cylindrical arch dam had a vertical water face with a radius of 240 ft (73m). The wall was 41 ft (12.5m) high, 15 ft (4.5m) thick at the base and 8 ft (2.4m) thick at the crest, with an 0.3m high parapet. It was constructed of solid sandstone quarried from the creek. Each block was carefully dressed to accurate dimensions and laid in courses 0.6m high. The dam wall extended about 4m into the abutments on each bank.

At Moriarty's suggestion the stones were bonded together with cement mortar to ensure watertightness. Two different cements were imported from England. Roman cement was used where the joints were in contact with the water, and Portland cement elsewhere.

For the next 25 years the dam was only used to replenish the Town Dam and as a bathing pool for boys. Plans to reticulate water to the town awaited the granting of appropriate powers to the local authority and the funding of a pump house, filter beds and pipes. This process was not completed until 1881.

By the mid-1890s the population of Parramatta had grown to 13 000, and a succession of drought years emptied the reservoir on several occasions. Increased storage became a necessity, and in 1898 C. W. Darley recommended the raising of the wall by 6 ft (2 m). The height was actually increased by 11 feet (3.3 m) in the form of a concrete arch founded on the stonework. The original spillway was a channel excavated at the northern abutment of the dam. This spillway was closed when the dam was raised, and provision was made for floods to pass over the raised dam crest, that incorporated a syphon spillway for low flows.

In 1909 the supply was discontinued when Parramatta was connected to the Sydney water system. During the 1920s and 1930s, the reserve served as a popular picnic and bathing spot, that even required its own life saving club. The Hunts Creek water reserve was later vested in Parramatta Council as a public recreation area and is known as the Lake Parramatta Reserve.

During the 1960s there were a number of drowning in the lake - because the water was very warm and muddy at the surface and very cold underneath - causing cramps - in a time when the average person did not swim so well.

== Description ==
The dam is located on Hunts Creek, within Lake Parramatta Reserve, 1.5 km north of the centre of the City of Parramatta.

Lake Parramatta Dam is a cylindrical masonry arch dam with a vertical water face that has a radius of 240 ft (73m). The original (1856) wall was 41 ft (12.5m) high, 15 ft (4.5m) thick at the base and 8 ft (2.4m) thick at the crest, with a 0.3m high parapet.

It was constructed of solid sandstone quarried from the creek. Each block was carefully dressed to accurate dimensions and laid in courses 0.6m high. The dam wall extended about 4m into the abutments on each bank.

The stone blocks were bonded together with cement mortar to ensure water-tightness. Two different cements were imported from England. Roman cement was used where the joints were in contact with the water and Portland cement elsewhere.

The original spillway was a channel excavated at the northern abutment of the dam. This spillway was closed when the dam was raised, and provision was made for floods to pass over the raised dam crest that incorporated a syphon spillway for low flows.

Considering its age, the condition of Lake Parramatta Dam is very good. The original sandstone masonry blocks are in excellent condition with no significant signs of weathering or spalling. Likewise the condition of the mortar is also very good with only minor leakage emanating in various locations.

The integrity of the dam is high; it retains water and is safe.

== Geography ==
The reserve comprises 60 hectares (150 acres) of bush and parkland that is located within 2 kilometres (1.2 mi) of the Parramatta central business district. The main watercourse entering the reserve, Hunts Creek, is a tributary of the Parramatta River. The reserve's boundaries to the west are cut off by suburban development along North Rocks Road, to the north by Hunts Creek, to the east by the private bushland and playing fields of The King's School, and to the south by James Ruse Drive.

Geologically, Lake Parramatta is located on the margins of the Wianamatta shale and Hawkesbury sandstone formations, with a resulting variation in vegetation communities. Vegetation communities present at the site include sandstone blue-gum forests, iron bark, Cumberland Plain Woodland vegetation communities and some coastal species such as Banksia serrata.

== Recreational use ==
When the water supply became insufficient for the growing demands, in 1909 Lake Parramatta was entrusted with its surrounds to the City of Parramatta as a recreational area. Between 1920 and 1940, the lake was a popular swimming hole with at one point the largest inland freshwater lifesaving club in Australia. By the late 1980s, the lack of consistently good water quality led to "No Swimming" signs being erected.

In 2006, the City of Parramatta reopened Lake Parramatta to limited swimming. After investigating different options the Council decided to allow swimming only on special event days. The first of these, called the Freshwater Festival, was held on 3 December 2006 featuring competitive swimming races from 10am till 12pm and public swimming from 1pm till 3pm, supervised by the Royal Life Saving Society Australia.

On Saturday 24 January 2015, Lake Parramatta officially became a designated swimming spot, with an area marked out with buoys for swimming and lifeguards present between 9am and 5pm on weekends and public holidays in the warm season. The reserve surrounding the swimming area includes recreational walking tracks within the scenic bushland, barbecue areas, children's playgrounds and a restaurant. Furthermore, visitors can also hire boats to explore the natural habitat.

== Access ==
Road access to Lake Parramatta is by a convoluted journey down a number of innocuous suburban streets that means the lake is a feature unknown and elusive to a great many Sydneysiders – tucked away as it is. Visitors would take Bourke Street off Church Street, Parramatta. Then onto Lacey Street then Illawong Drive, passing under James Ruse Drive. Illawong Drive passes into the reserve and follows the eastern edge of the lake. When travelling by bus from the Parramatta Bus Interchange, the CDC NSW route 609 is an option. Sydney Trains' nearest station is at Parramatta.

== Heritage listing ==
Lake Parramatta Dam was the first large dam built in Australia. It was "completed in 1856, practically simultaneously with and probably independently of the modern arch dams in Europe". The dam has an important place in the history of both dam technology in Australia and in the design of arch dams in the world.

In detail:

- It is the first large dam built in Australia.
- It is the only ashlar masonry arch dam in Australia (B Cole).
- It is believed to be:
  - the eleventh single arch dam world-wide since antiquity;
  - the only masonry dam in the world to combine the use of Roman and Portland cements in the one structure.
- It has a very slender cross section when compared with structures of similar age.
- It was the storage for one of the earliest suburban water projects in Australia and remained in service for sixty years.
- Its design and construction involved three of the most significant public works operatives of the time: Captain Percy Simpson, who was initially appointed engineer for the works and is believed to be the designer; Edward Orpen Moriarty, the supervising engineer for construction; and W. Randle, the contractor.
- "A dominant feature of the dam is its modest volume of 3,000m3 of masonry, resulting from the fact that the base is only 4.6m thick. Had it been a gravity type, it would have been about twice as thick at the base with a consequent doubling of the material required"
- The design of the dam is thought to have been a precursor to the use of the "cylinder" formula used by C. W. Darley in his design of thirteen thin arch dams constructed between 1896 and 1908 which aroused international attention.
- The raising of the dam's height in 1898 by C. W. Darley was part of the earliest arch dam construction programs in the world, and attracted appropriate international attention.
- The raising of the dam 3.3 m by the addition of a concrete ring was achieved without diminishing the integrity of the original structure.
- The quality of the dam's design, construction and raising is demonstrated by it remaining in excellent condition and being able to withstand "probable maximum flood" conditions.
- The dam remains the focus of an important social and recreational facility for Parramatta and surrounding district.

Lake Parramatta was listed on the New South Wales State Heritage Register on 23 March 2012 having satisfied the following criteria.

The place has a strong or special association with a person, or group of persons, of importance of cultural or natural history of New South Wales's history.

Lake Parramatta Dam is associated with four people of state significance in the mid to late nineteenth century colony of NSW: Captain Percy Simpson, Edward Orpen Moriarty, Cecil West Darley and William Randle (Randall).

Captain Percy Simpson (1789–1877), surveyor, engineer and administrator.

Simpson was initially appointed engineer for the dam works and is believed to be the designer. As a free migrant to NSW in 1822, Simpson gained experience managing convicts as the commandant of the convict agricultural settlement at Wellington (1823). In 1828 he was appointed as an assistant surveyor of roads and bridges and from 1828 to 1832 he supervised the construction of the Devine's Hill section of the technically challenging Great North Road at Wisemans Ferry where he developed his skills in the use of ashlar retaining walls. This section of the Great North Road is testament to Simpson's engineering skills and his supervision of convict labour (some working in irons) to a very high standard of construction. Simpson's ability to manage convict labour and his administrative and engineering skills were recognised by successive governors. Surveyor General Sir Thomas Mitchell knew of "no other officer in the Colony to whom I could with better expectation as to the results, intrust any work connected with the formation of roads, bridges and streets.". The challenging road from Lapstone Hill to Mitchell's Pass in the Blue Mountains, bridges at Wollombi, Lansdowne and Duck Creek and the Queens Wharf at Sydney Cove are all attributed to Simpson. Following colonial administrative positions in the 1830s, Simpson returned to Ireland in the 1840s to work on railways. He returned to Sydney in 1850 as a civil engineer and was involved in the radical new design and construction of Lake Parramatta Dam. He remained in Parramatta in the 1850s and 1860s serving as a district registrar.

Edward Orpen Moriarty (1824–1896), consulting engineer and surveyor

About 1849 Moriarty commenced private practice in Sydney as a civil engineer, carrying out various schemes including the development of coal mines at Wollongong; design of the first Pyrmont bridge across Darling Harbour, timber bridges over the Murrumbidgee at Wagga Wagga and the Nepean at Richmond, and supervision of Lake Parramatta Dam. In the latter capacity he may have modified the dam design and recommended the use of specific mortars in the joints between the stones. In October 1858 he was appointed Engineer-in-Chief for Harbours and River Navigation in the Public Works Department which he directed until he retired in December 1888. During that time he carried out many important harbour and hydraulic works including the initial development of the Port of Newcastle. Other works included construction and excavation of breakwaters, basins and docks at Wollongong and Kiama; improvements at the mouth of the Clarence and Richmond Rivers; a harbour of refuge at Trial Bay; extensive wharfage in Sydney harbour, and enlargement of the Sutherland Dock at Cockatoo Island Dockyard. Moriarty was also significantly involved in devising the Upper Nepean Scheme for Sydney.

Cecil West Darley (1842–1928)

Cecil Darley became Principal Assistant Engineer Harbours & Rivers of the Public Works Department in 1881, under Moriarty. Under him "many of the water supply works in the Colony were constructed". Darley succeeded Moriarty as Engineer-in-Chief Harbours & Rivers in 1889 and became Chief Engineer PWD in 1896. In 1898 Moriarty recommended a raising of Lake Parramatta Dam. He is renowned for the thirteen thin arch dams built to his direction around the beginning of the 20th century and described by Wade.

William Randle (Randall)

William Randle was responsible for construction of the first steam railway in Australia (in Melbourne) and for building Fort Denison (sandstone masonry) in Sydney Harbour. He built the first railway in NSW from Sydney to Parramatta where he achieved outstanding progress using "modern methods" of shifting spoil in wagons on rails. His superior and innovative construction skills were again demonstrated in constructing Lake Parramatta Dam.

The place is important in demonstrating aesthetic characteristics and/or a high degree of creative or technical achievement in New South Wales.

Lake Parramatta Dam has state significance for its technical innovation and achievement because:

- It was a very economical dam, requiring the minimum quantities of material, all available locally except the cements.
- While there is no conclusive evidence that the design had a theoretical basis, the fact that Percy Simpson, the first known person involved in the dam's design was also involved in the construction of high masonry walls on the Great North Road, leads to the belief that a certain degree of innovation and adaptation was involved in translating the design across to dams.
- The mortar used for jointing the masonry blocks is an especially innovative feature of the dam. Chestnut (1982) reports that "manufactured Roman Cement (rather than burnt lime or gypsum) is the main cementing component in the mortar. This material forms a strong and dense product and probably explains the lack of leaching in the (permeable) in-service environment....." The use of Roman Cement is confirmed by Moriarty: "All the masonry ... in the wall is set in Roman Cement, the stones having been carefully dressed to templates...". A contemporary report in the Empire newspaper states "That portion of the work which is subject to the continual action of water has been set in Roman cement, and the remaining portion in Portland cement". From H. J. Cowan's paper on the history of concrete, it appears "Roman Cement" dates from the production of this material in England by James Parker in 1796 from clays containing veins of calcareous matter, while Portland Cement was first produced by Joseph Aspdin in 1811 from separately occurring deposits of limestone and clay. It is believed that this is the first dam to incorporate Portland and manufactured Roman Cement in its construction.
- Another innovative aspect was Randle's method of handling and placing the masonry blocks in the dam. A description is given in the report of 8 June 1855 on the laying of the foundation stone, and is quoted below.

"The commencement already made, consists in the formation of a timber frame over the entire site of the dam, running at the height of thirty three feet; along this a travelling-jenny travels, and the operations of raising the blocks and lowering them in their destination are performed with the utmost precision. A weight of twenty tons may be moved by this machinery, but the power applied in the present work will probably range between two and six tons. The labour is now directed to the excavation of the sides of the ravine to form footings and abutments for the dam wall, and also to preparing and laying the courses. The circumstances of the water being at its lowest ebb is very propitious to the operations...." Associated with this was a rail line to transport the masonry blocks from the quarry to the gantry at the dam.

- The raising of the dam in 1898 using a concrete arch on its crest, was part of a program of thin arch dam construction in NSW by the Public Works Department which attracted international attention because of its reliance on the cylinder formula.
- The high quality of the design and construction is demonstrated by its ability to meet modern safety standards after 140 years of service.

The place has strong or special association with a particular community or cultural group in New South Wales for social, cultural or spiritual reasons.

The Institution of Engineers has declared Lake Parramatta Dam a National Engineering Landmark.

The completion of Lake Parramatta Dam in 1856 was an important event for those living in the Parramatta district. The previous water source, the Town Dam on the Parramatta River, was polluted, unreliable and unhygienic, whereas the new source supplied pure and wholesome water, and its storage enabled the supply to continue through the drought years. The breakthrough came when the citizens finally persuaded the government to fund the cost. Twenty-five years later a pump house and reticulation system brought the water from the dam to the streets of Parramatta.

The dam is now a central feature of Lake Parramatta Reserve park which is visited regularly by tourists and picnickers. The birdlife (mainly waterfowl) and native fauna around the dam and fish in the lake are pleasant distractions from the otherwise drab suburbia of western Sydney. A nature trail follows the perimeter of part of the storage.

The Reserve forms an attractive recreation area in the Parramatta district. The amenities include a small beach, barbecues, picnic areas, car parking facilities, a kiosk, and children's playgrounds. The most popular activity is bushwalking, and there is also an orienteering track within the Reserve.

Following on representations made by the Wild Life Preservation Society of Australia, the Parramatta Council in 1958 adopted the bushland area and the maintenance and development of the recreation area as one of its objectives. The council also applied to the Fauna Protection Panel to have the area proclaimed a Complete Sanctuary and it became the first wildlife refuge in the Sydney area.

The place possesses uncommon, rare or endangered aspects of the cultural or natural history of New South Wales.

Lake Parramatta Dam is a rarity. It is the only masonry arch dam in Australia. It was the first large dam, one year ahead of Melbourne's Yan Yean Dam. (Strictly speaking, large dams are over 15m high above lowest foundation level, which Lake Parramatta Dam became in 1898, after a 3.3m raising). It was the first arch dam and 40 years passed before the next arch dam was built (Lithgow Dam, 1896).

While Lake Parramatta Dam is the only masonry arch dam in Australia, it is a cylindrical arch dam of which many more were built, but in concrete and several decades later (13 in NSW and one in SA). Consequently, Lake Parramatta Dam cannot be compared with any similar dams in Australia. As such it set a valuable design precedent.

The place is important in demonstrating the principal characteristics of a class of cultural or natural places/environments in New South Wales.

The dam is a fine example of its type. Its thin section and appropriate curvature provided Parramatta with an economical dam. The original stone work is clearly visible from the downstream side and remains in good condition. The dam demonstrates the application of the stonemason's craft to a water-retaining structure of some magnitude. The choice of Roman cement mortar bonding between the stones has proved to be an inspired choice, having withstood 140 years of use with a minimum of leakage or deterioration.

The essential character of the dam was retained when the raising was carried out in 1898. Although concrete was the chosen material, it was sympathetically applied. The arch form was maintained, the stones courses were simulated and the original stonework remained in full view, reminiscent of Fort Denison in Sydney Harbour.

Considering its age, the condition of Lake Parramatta Dam is very good. The integrity of the original sandstone masonry blocks is excellent, with no significant signs of weathering or spalling. Likewise the condition of the mortar is also very good with only minor leakage emanating in various locations.

== Gallery ==
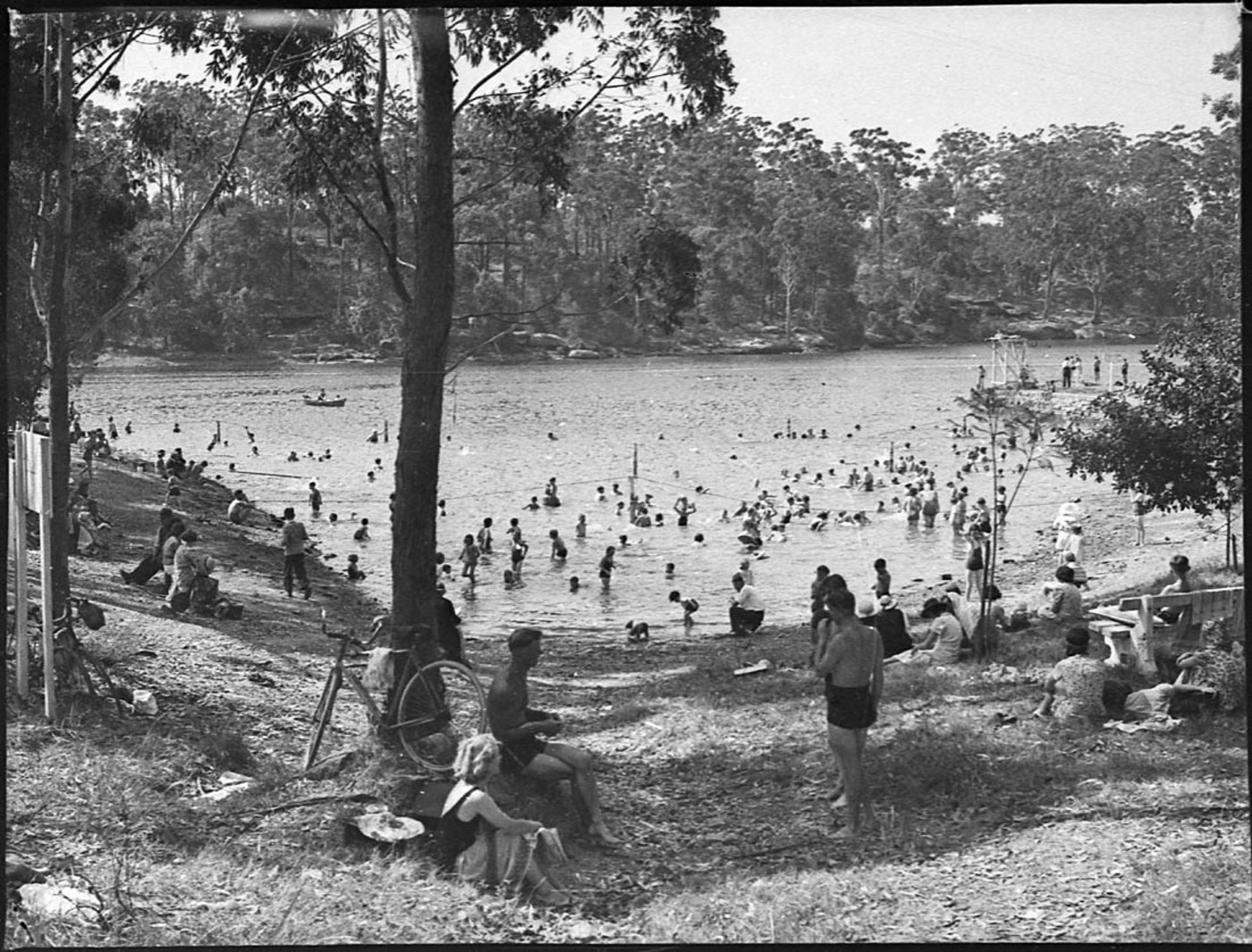
Swimming in the lake, December 1938, photo by Sam Hood

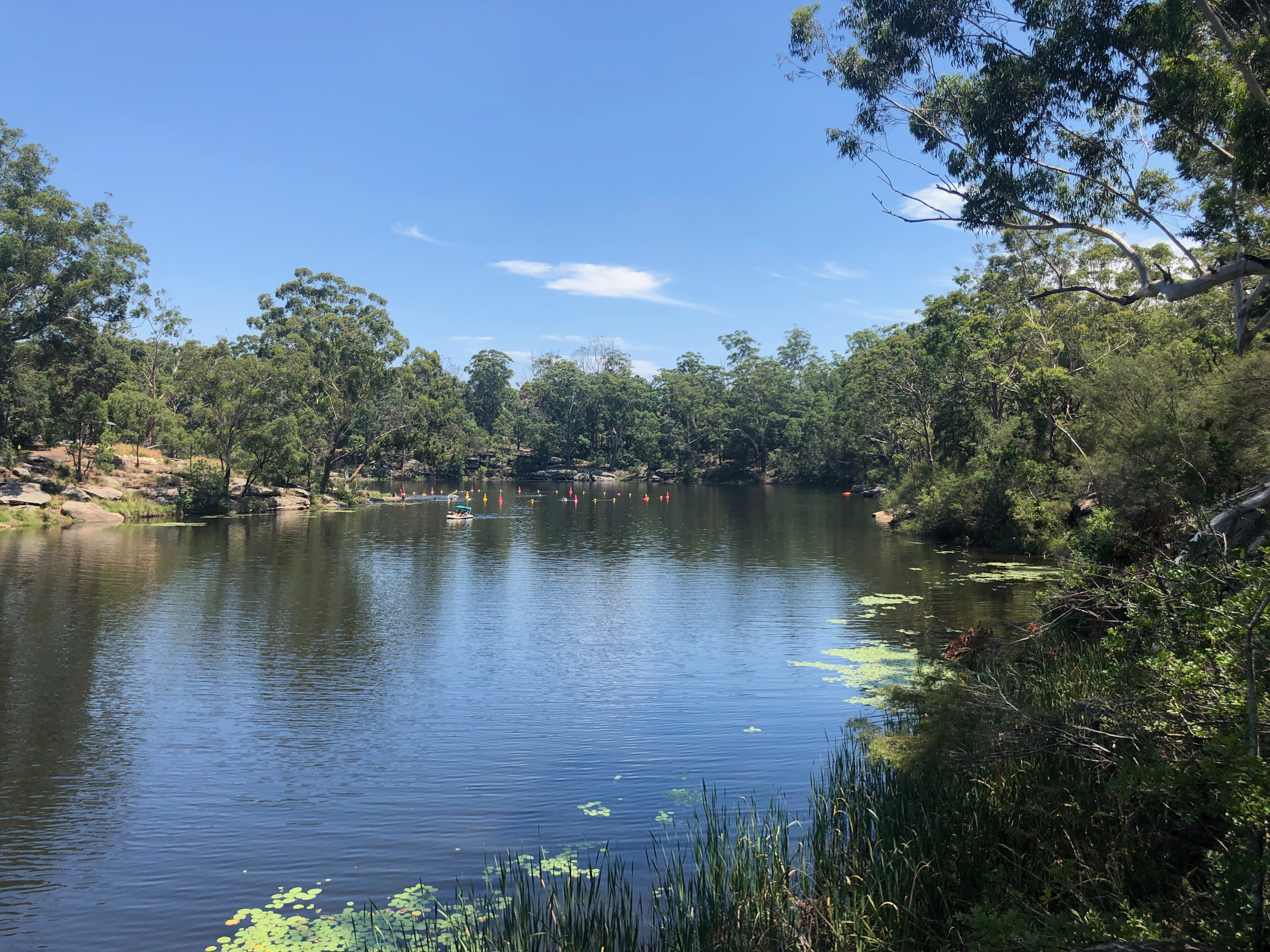
Lake Parramatta, January 2019

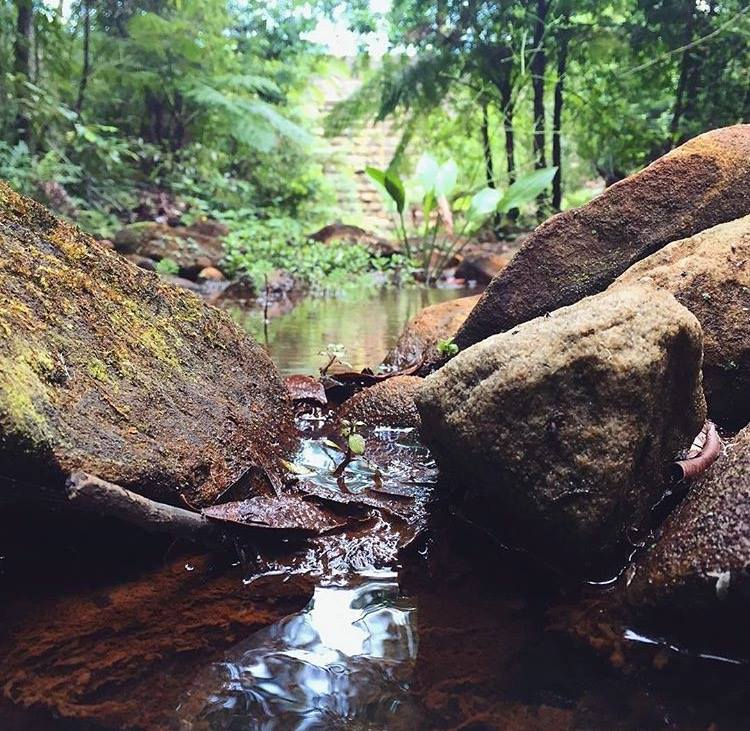
A small stream within the lake

== See also ==
- Chipping Norton Lake
- Prospect Reservoir
- Bents Basin
- Geography of Sydney
