= Bidjigal =

Aboriginal Australian people

Bidjigal people
- aka: Bediagal.

Hierarchy
- Language family: Pama–Nyungan
- Language branch: Yuin–Kuric
- Language group: Dharug

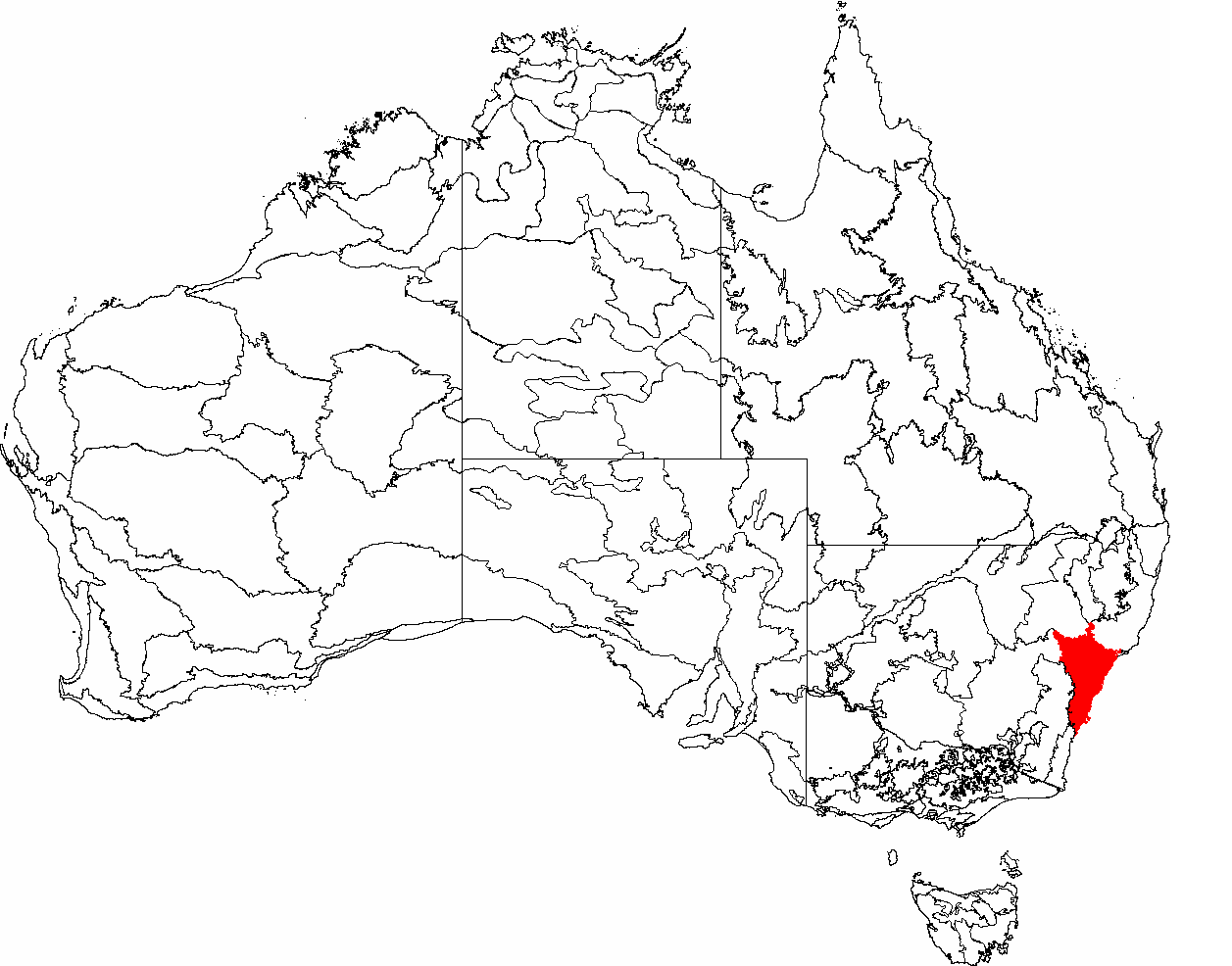
Area (unknown) The Sydney Basin, where the Bidjigal people are located
- Bioregion: Sydney basin
- Location: St George, Botany Bay, Western Sydney, and the Hills District
- Rivers: Cooks, parts of the Hawkesbury River & Georges rivers; Salt Pan & Wolli creeks
- Other geological: Bidjigal Reserve

Notable individuals
- Pemulwuy. Josh Cook

The Bidjigal (also spelt Bediagal, Bejigal, Bedegal or Biddegal) people are an Aboriginal Australian people whose traditional lands are modern-day western, north-western, south-eastern, and southern Sydney, in New South Wales, Australia. The land includes the Bidjigal Reserve, Salt Pan Creek and the Georges River. They are part of the Dharug language group.

The Bidjigal clan were the first Indigenous Australians to encounter the First Fleet. Led by Pemulwuy, the Bidjigal people resisted European colonisation from the First Fleet's arrival in 1788.

== Identity ==
The Bidjigal are a clan of the Dharug people. Additionally, academic Kohen has suggested that there may have been some confusion between two distinct groups: the Bidjigal (living in the Baulkham Hills area) and the Bediagal at Botany Bay in the Salt Pan Creek area. Anthropologist Val Attenbrow discusses their possible origin and location, and concludes that the question is "somewhat vexed". Norman Tindale, referring on the earliest historical sources, regarded them as a horde occupying the area just north of Castle Hill, Their geographical location is confusing, as they seem to have been based in southern Sydney, in the region between the Cooks River, Wolli Creek and the Georges River to Salt Pan Creek, and yet also seem to have inhabited land in the Hills District of Sydney, in what is now Baulkham Hills.

Coastal areas and beaches such as Bondi and Coogee are believed to have been concurrently occupied by a combination of Bidjigal, Gadigal and Birrabirrragal clan groups, who were a shared saltwater cultural group, all from the Dharug language group and strong ties of kinship.

== Culture ==
=== Significance of fire ===
Fire is of central importance to Bidjigal culture and practices. This includes smoking ceremonies, which are a means of communicating with the Fire Spirit. Smoking ceremonies are part of many Aboriginal and Torres Strait Islander clans' cultures, and are a means of cleansing people and places of bad spirits to protect from the dangerous powers of spiritual beings.

=== Gender ===
Men, women and children have different roles in the clan. Men are the warriors, gatekeepers and protectors, while women are storytellers and nurturers. The men are taught to respect and care for the women. Men and women would contribute to fishing, the main source of food for the Bidjigal people. Men would use spears to hunt the fish while the women would use hooks and lines, and both would do so on canoes made from local wood. The women would also gather shellfish. Men would be the key providers for everything.

=== Shellwork ===
The women and girls have historically made decorative and functional 'shellwork' from seashells. Shellwork is common amongst coastal Aboriginal and Torres Strait Islander peoples, although the connections and practices remain under-researched. La Perouse remains a major site of production. The shellwork was popular amongst tourists, particularly amongst white women. The shellwork still blurs the line between art and artefact, and is now often part of museum exhibitions.

In 2015 Bidjigal Elder, artist and shellworker Esme Timbery collaborated with Wiradjuri/Kamilaroi artist Jonathan Jones on the seven-story shell art installation 'Shell Wall 2015' in Barangaroo. The public artwork remains on the southern side of the Alexander residential building.

=== Koojay Corroboree ===
A corroboree broadly refers to a meeting of Aboriginal Australians, sometimes of different clans. The Randwick City Council, in conjunction with the La Perouse Local Aboriginal Land Council, have hosted an annual Koojay Corroboree since 2015, although not running in 2021 due to the COVID-19 pandemic. The Koojay Corroboree is held on Coogee Beach, with the name referring to the traditional Dharug name for the beach, Koojay. The Koojay Corroboree is held during National Reconciliation Week (NRW) and commemorates the Bidjigal and Gadigal people, who both inhabited the land. The festival involves cultural activities, such as fire ceremonies, song and dance.

== Language group ==
They were a subgroup/clan of the Dharug people, the Bidjigal would have spoken Dharug.

The name Bidjigal means plains-dweller in the Dharug language.

== History ==
The Bidjigal population was an estimated 500 people at the time of the British arrival, making them one of the most densely populated areas prior to colonisation. The Bidjigal clan, like many of the Dharug people, utilised their access to water for fishing, with fish being their main source of food. This includes Georges rivers, Cooks River, Salt Pan Creek, Wolli Creek and parts of the Hawkesbury River. This has resulted in different sea animals, including the whales and eels, being totemic, or culturally significant. The eel's migratory journey would be celebrated at the start of the eel's migration, or the 'running of the eels', with feasts and ceremonies. Archaeological evidence has also indicated different tools and weapons were used for hunting local wildlife on land, such as boomerangs.

== Colonisation and its impacts ==
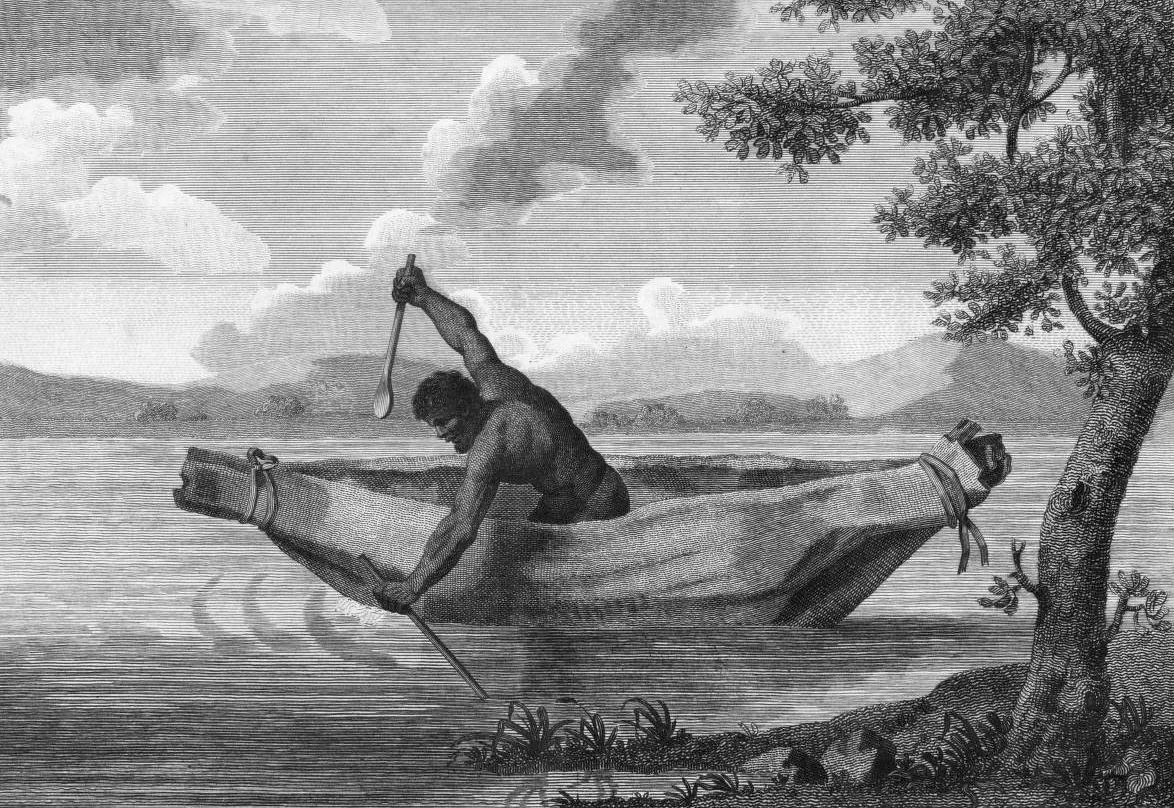
Painting of Pemulwuy, the leader of the Aboriginal resistance in the Bidjigal clan

The Bidjigal people were the first to encounter Captain Cook and the First Fleet. There was a strong Aboriginal resistance to colonisation. There was a period of sustained warfare throughout coastal Sydney, involving the Bidjigal clan at the Sydney basin, from 1788 to 1817. The Aboriginal people utilised guerrilla-style warfare, as a way of combating the vast gap in weaponry capabilities to the colonists. One battle tactic was their War Dance, where the Aboriginal fighters would dance from a high vantage point to distract hostile colonists and slow their reloading speed before throwing spears. Prospect Hill was one of the major sites of warfare and Indigenous deaths.

Despite their resistance, several factors resulted in their displacement and the destruction of their ability to continue many aspects of their traditional way of life. The clan was severely weakened by the many deaths caused by the smallpox epidemic in 1790. At the time, Governor Phillip estimated deaths to be around half of the Aboriginal people, although estimates since then have been much higher, with most of the Bidjigal clan perishing. Debate remains around whether or not the disease was smallpox or chickenpox, and whether it was brought deliberately by European colonists. Nonetheless, the deaths decimated population size. This, alongside continuing expansion and violence from encroaching colonists into the area, prevented the Bidjigal clan from living life as they used to, although descendants continue to preserve and celebrate their culture.

Rock art and middens from the Bidjigal people remain in several areas across Sydney, including Bondi, George's River and the heritage listed paintings in a hidden, private cave in Undercliffe. These historical sites are at risk of being eroded and/or lost for a variety of reasons, including public intervention, vandalism, natural erosion and failure of governments or councils to take necessary actions to ensure preservation.

=== Bidjigal Reserve ===
The Bidjigal Reserve is a 300 hectare corridor of protected public bushland along Darling Mills Creek, mostly lying within The Hills Shire. The Bidjigal clan have inhabited the area for at least 40 000 years. The rock overhangs and caves provided shelter, freshwater provided the opportunity for fishing, and the plants and animals were utilised for food, medicine and creating tools. In 1804, the Bidjigal reserve was included in 3,800 acres of land set aside by Governor King as the Baulkham Hills Common, but in 1818 was given to private individuals as land grants. The area was named Excelsior Reserve, and the flora and fauna suffered from the introduction of foreign wildlife, such as foxes, clearing of the land by settlers for construction projects, and wildfires. One such project was the M2 Motorway, which was considered 'environmentally controversial' due to the destruction and disconnection of parts of the bushland. In 2004, an agreement was reached between the Indigenous population and the local council, whereby representatives of Dharug descendants were included on a new board, and the park was renamed from Excelsior Reserve to Bidjigal, and the Native Title claim over the area was withdrawn.

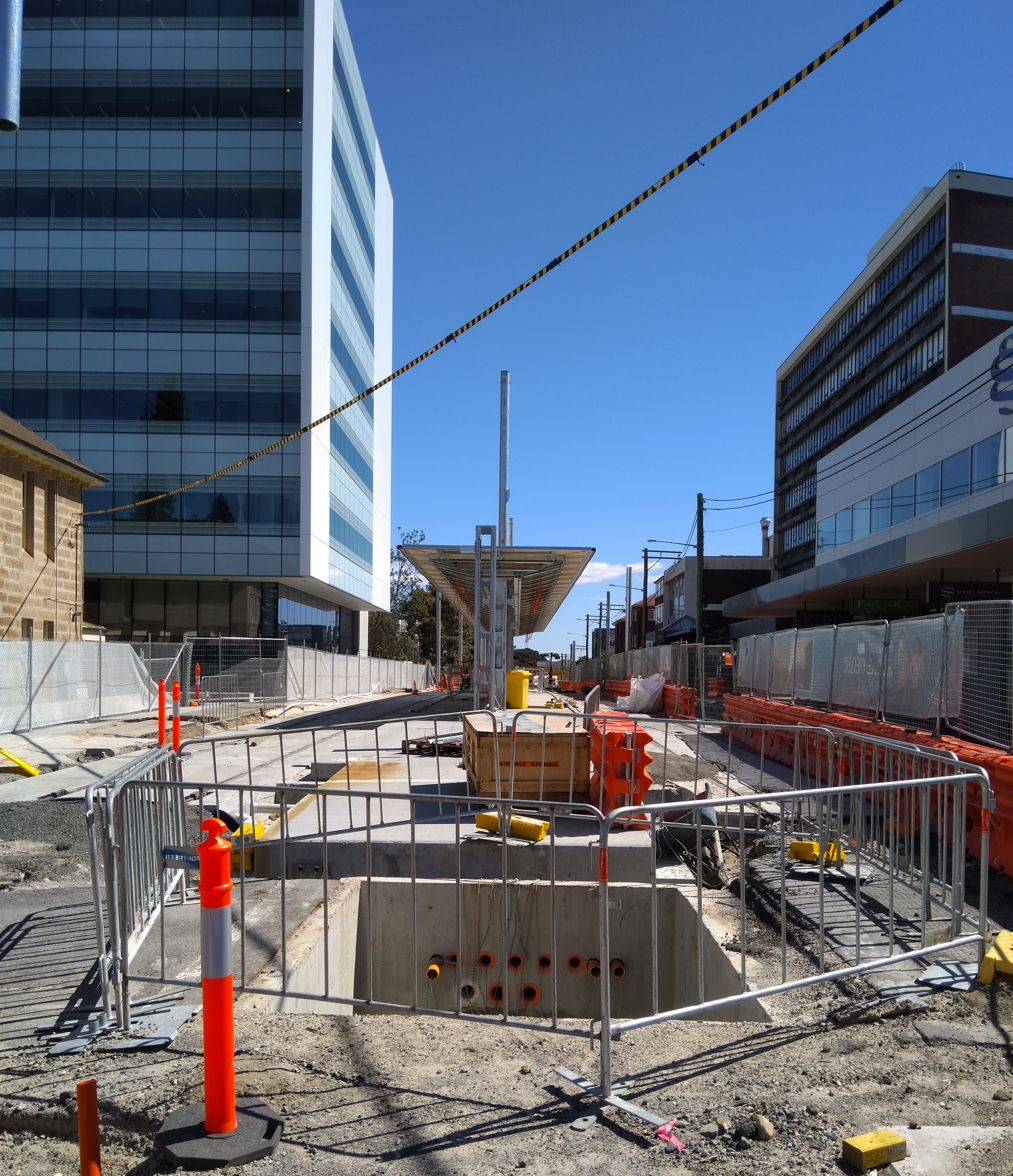
Construction of the Randwick light rail stop, 2018

=== Sydney light rail construction ===
The Bidjigal clan were part of a conflict between Aboriginal Elders and the Federal Government regarding the construction of the Sydney light rail following the discovery of Indigenous artefacts on the construction site. Over 22 000 artefacts were found in a 100-metre-square area around the light rail's proposed tram stabling yard in Randwick, including spearheads and cutting tools. Transport for NSW employed four Aboriginal groups to advise on cultural heritage following the discovery. Bidjigal Elders claimed that paid consultants were chosen over the traditional owners in consultation, and that the consultants had a vested interest in the construction going ahead. Despite protest and an emergency heritage appeal under the federal 'Aboriginal and Torres Strait Islander Heritage Protection Act', construction went ahead. Federal Environment Minister Greg Hunt ultimately determined that the area did not satisfy a significant Aboriginal area, and denied an emergency stop work order. Over 21,000 artefacts were excavated and preserved, although thousands more were disturbed and destroyed by construction. The presence of objects such as weapons indicate the area was a site of conflict, marking a high probability of death occurring on the site.

== Modern place name ==
The name of the Bidjigal is today remembered by the name of the 186-hectare (460-acre) Bidjigal Reserve, in Baulkham Hills, Castle Hill, Carlingford, North Rocks and Northmead to the north-west of Sydney. The Bidjigal Reserve was known as Excelsior Park until 2004, when it was dedicated to preserve Aboriginal cultural heritage, local flora and fauna and for public recreation. The Bidjigal word Wolli means 'camping place', and is the name suburb and waterway through the Wolli Creek Valley, both being Wolli Creek.

== Notable individuals ==
Perhaps the most famous Bidjigal person was Pemulwuy, who successfully led Aboriginal resistance forces against European colonisation, before finally being captured and killed by explorer Henry Hacking in 1802. The treatment of his severed head and Pemulwuy's depiction in European art remain the subject of controversy and academic pursuit, in their significance as representatives of European disregard for Aboriginal culture and paternalism.

William Victor Simms, known as Vic Simms or Uncle Vic, is a Bidjigal man and Australian singer and songwriter. He was the first Aboriginal man to appear on commercial TV and became an international recording artist.

Josh Cook is a professional rugby league footballer and is part of the Bidjigal and Yuin clans.

=== The Timbery family ===
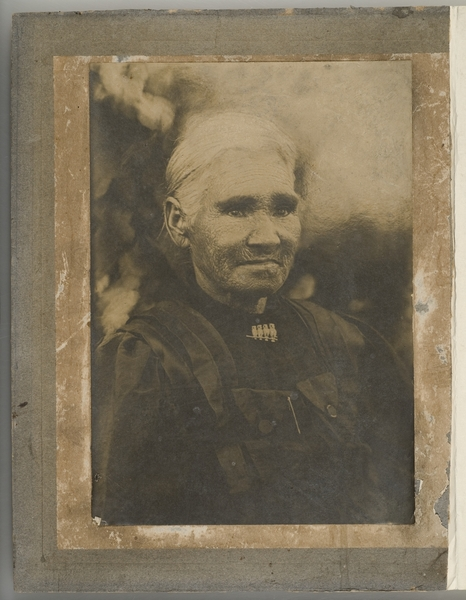
Portrait of Emma Timbery

The Timbery family are said to have been present when the First Fleet arrived, and are descendants of Pemulwuy. They have notably impacted Aboriginal and secular culture, and still remain in the La Perouse area where they first discovered the First Fleet. They continue to tell their family story of the invasion, which tells that they gained some level of trust from the colonisers, turning into responsibility for certain members of the family such as Joe Timbery, who was designated 'King of the Five Islands' by Governor Lachlan Macquarie in 1816. However, they also allege that their openness did not protect them from the cruelty of the colonisers, who still raped and abused the women of the clan.

Esme Timbery was a Bidjigal woman and Elder. She was also a notable shell worker, with her art featured in several museums throughout Australia. Esme and her sister Rose were fourth-generation shell artists and descendants of Emma Timbery, who began the family tradition of shellwork, amongst other achievements in language preservation. The men have partaken in the wooden crafts, with members such as Joe Timbery being a notable boomerang and shield maker. Laddie Timbery also gained notability in his later life for his boomerangs, valued both artistically and culturally.

Garry Purchase is an artist of Dharawal, Bidjigal and Dhungutti descent, and is part of the Timbery family. His paintings "The Journey" and "Missing Pieces" won both the Aboriginal Health award in 2014, 2016 and 2017 respectively. "The Journey" also won the People's Choice award at Mental Health Art Works! 2014.

== See also ==
- Aboriginal Australians
- Cadigal
- Pemulwuy

== Sources ==
- Attenbrow, Val (2010). Sydney's Aboriginal Past: Investigating the Archaeological and Historical Records. University of New South Wales Press. ISBN 978-1-742-23116-7.
- Dixon, Robert M. W. (2002). Australian Languages: Their Nature and Development. Vol. 1. Cambridge University Press. ISBN 978-0-521-47378-1.
- Goodall, Heather; Cadzow, Allison (2009). Rivers and Resilience: Aboriginal People on Sydney's Georges River. University of New South Wales Press. ISBN 978-1-921-41074-1.
- Kohen, J. L. (1993). The Darug and their neighbours: the traditional Aboriginal owners of the Sydney region. Blacktown and District Historical Society. ISBN 978-0-646-13619-6.
- Kohen, J. L. (2005). "Pemulwuy (1750–1802)". Australian Dictionary of Biography. Melbourne University Press.
- Tindale, Norman Barnett (1974). "Eora (NSW)". Aboriginal Tribes of Australia: Their Terrain, Environmental Controls, Distribution, Limits, and Proper Names. Australian National University. Archived from the original on 8 April 2017.
