= Baulkham Hills =

Suburb of Sydney, Australia

- Suburb
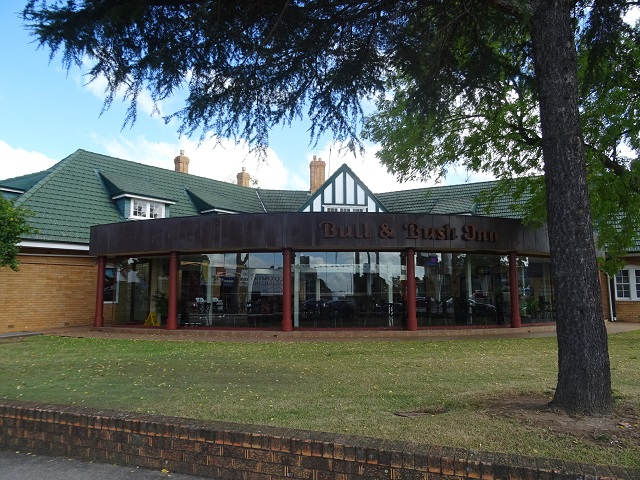
- The Bull and Bush Hotel

- Interactive map of Baulkham Hills
- Country: Australia
- State: New South Wales
- LGAs: The Hills; City of Parramatta
- Location: 28 km (17 mi) north-west of Sydney CBD
- Established: 1794

Government
  - State electorates: Castle Hill; Kellyville; Winston Hills
  - Federal division: Mitchell
- Elevation: 103 m (338 ft)

Population
  - Total: 37,415 (SAL 2021)
- Postcode: 2153
Suburbs around Baulkham Hills
| Bella Vista | Norwest | Castle Hill |
| Kings Langley | Baulkham Hills | West Pennant Hills |
| Winston Hills | Northmead | North Rocks |

Baulkham Hills (/bɔːlkəm/ BAWL-kəm;) is a suburb in the Hills District of Greater Sydney, in the state of New South Wales, Australia. It is located within 30 kilometres (19 mi) north-west of the Sydney central business district mostly within the local government area of The Hills Shire, of which Baulkham Hills was formerly the administrative seat and namesake of The Hills Shire. A small section of the suburb which is located south of the Hills Motorway-Windsor Road intersection is part of the City of Parramatta.

== Geography ==
Baulkham Hills is predominately a residential suburb of the Hills District. Baulkham Hills Junction is the intersection of three major roads; Windsor Road, Old Northern Road, and Seven Hills Road. The suburb is bounded by Old Windsor Road and the North-West T-way in the west; Junction Road in the south which is parallel to the Hills Motorway, forming part of the National Highway. The Western Sydney Dry Rainforest is found in small fragments in the suburb.

== History ==
The land that is now called Baulkham Hills was originally home to the Bidjigal people, who are believed to be a clan of the Darug people, who occupied all the land to the immediate west of Sydney. The best-known Aboriginal person from that time is Pemulwuy, a Bidjigal leader who led the Indigenous resistance movement against the British forces, including sacking farms in Castle Hill, before his eventual capture and execution by the British militia.

The Bidjigal people are today commemorated by Bidjigal Reserve which straddles the suburbs of Castle Hill, Baulkham Hills, North Rocks, and West Pennant Hills.

The first European settler in the Baulkham Hills Shire was William Joyce, who arrived in Australia in October 1791. In December 1794, he was given a grant of 30 acres (121,000 m^{2}) in what became Baulkham Hills. He built a farmhouse on this land, but it was damaged by a fire in 1804, so he rebuilt it. The house still stands; however, it is now on a 2,055 m^{2} property which backs onto Old Windsor Road.

On 12 November 1799 Andrew McDougall setteled in Baulkham Hills. McDougall is credited by the Hills Historical Society as having heen the one to have named the area Baulkham Hills.

The suburb was largely made up of land grants until the mid 19th century, when many of these started to be subdivided into farms. This was accelerated by the construction of the Rogans Hill Railway Line. Urban developments were expedited from the 1960s. The name Baulkham Hills was given to the area by Andrew McDougall, a settler from Buckholm Hills, County of Roxburgh, Scotland. The name, which reminded McDougall of his homeland, was officially recognised in 1802. Baulkham Hills Post Office opened on 1 April 1856.

On 29 June 2018, northern portions of the suburb of Baulkham Hills were proclaimed as parts of the new suburbs of Norwest and Bella Vista. This area contained the commercial district of Norwest Business Park, which is no longer within Baulkham Hills.

== Heritage listings ==
Baulkham Hills has a number of heritage-listed sites, including:

- Seven Hills Road, Bella Vista: Pearce Family Cemetery

== Demographics ==
According to the 2021 census, there were 37,415 residents in Baulkham Hills. 56.8% of residents were born in Australia. The most common countries of birth were China 8.2%, India 7.5%, England 2.3%, South Korea 2.1% and Sri Lanka 1.7%. 55.6% of residents spoke only English at home. Other languages spoken at home included Mandarin 10.2%, Cantonese 4.2%, Hindi 3.2%, Korean 2.8% and Tamil 2.1%. The most common responses for religious affiliation were No Religion, so described 29.7%, Catholic 23.4%, Anglican 10.8% and Hinduism 8.9%. The median weekly house hold income was $2474

== Transport ==
Express bus services and the new Sydney Metro Northwest line services the suburb.

At the intersection known as Baulkham Hills Junction several major roads meet including: Seven Hills Road, Old Northern Road and Windsor Road. The fastest route from the Sydney CBD is via the M2 Hills Motorway, exiting at Windsor Road.

Buses are run by CDC NSW, providing services to the nearby commercial centres and railway stations of Castle Hill, Parramatta and frequent services to the Sydney CBD. Routes 610X (formerly route M61), 614X and 615X are express buses to the City which run via bus lanes on the M2 motorway. Route 612X services to North Sydney also uses the M2 motorway. Route 613X is a Hillsbus express route from Chapel Lane in Baulkham Hills to the Queen Victoria Building near Town Hall Station.

Route 600 (formerly route M60) provides a high-frequency service to the areas around parramatta and Pennant Hills.

In the past, the Rogans Hill railway line connected the suburb to Parramatta. Railway Street near Baulkham Hills Junction is a reminder of this. It was closed down in 1930 due to traffic problems on Windsor Road and large financial losses. Land owned by the rail authority was sold to the Hills Bowling Club in the mid-1970s to build their two front bowling greens.

== Commercial area ==
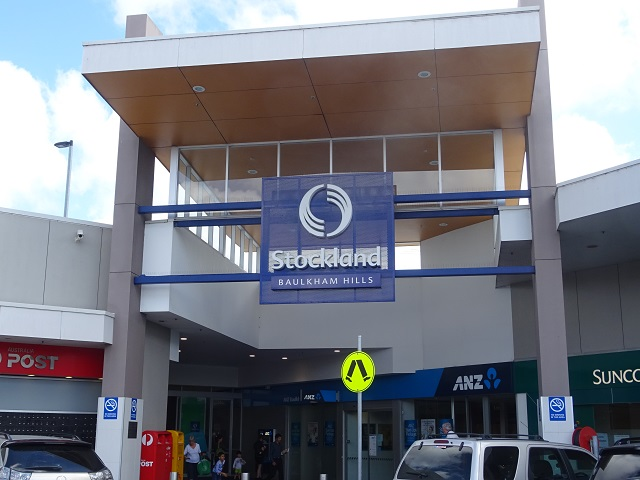
Grove Square

Grove Square is a shopping centre located between Windsor Road and Old Northern Road, and covers the entire northern expanse of Olive Street. It features supermarkets operated by Coles, Woolworths, and Aldi plus 70 specialty shops. A redevelopment was completed in 2008 to significantly expand the floor space of the centre.

== Hospital ==
The Hills Private Hospital on Windsor Road (near the corner of Merindah Road) was redeveloped into a rehabilitation and mental health hospital, after the hospital's owners, Healthscope, moved its operations to the nearby Norwest Business Park. After the acute Hospital was reopened in the Norwest Business Park (Norwest Private Hospital), The Hills Private Hospital was then converted into a rehabilitation and mental health hospital. The hospital includes a 86-bed rehabilitation unit and a 25-bed mental health unit, providing both inpatient and day program services.

== Parks and reserves ==
Baulkham Hills features a number of parks and reserves, such as the Bidjigal Reserve (previously known as Excelsior Reserve), with native fauna such as koalas, swamp wallabies, echidnas, and eastern water dragons. Smaller reserves include the Sophia Doyle reserve and the Crestwood Reserve, which are habitat to brushtail and ringtail possums and a wide range of birds and lizards.

The Baulkham Hills Shire Bushland Conservation Committee is a voluntary committee of Council that assists with the management of the Shire's bushland.

== Schools ==
- Matthew Pearce Public School
- Crestwood High School
- Crestwood Public School
- Baulkham Hills High School
- Model Farms High School
- Baulkham Hills North Public School
- Jasper Road Public School
- St. Michael's Primary School
- Our Lady of Lourdes Primary School

== Places of worship ==
Baulkham Hills has some 15 places of worship belonging to various Christian denominations including:

- St. Michaels Catholic Church
- Our Lady of Lourdes Catholic Church
- Holy Trinity Anglican Church
- Crossway Anglican Church
- St Matthews Uniting Church
- The headquarters of Hillsong
- Norwest Anglican Church (Chapel Lane is the evening congregation)
- Africa Inland Mission International

A Baha'i Spiritual Assembly is also located in the suburb.

== Culture ==
Baulkham Hills has a public library. It does not have a theatre or a cinema; although these are found in the adjacent suburb of Castle Hill where many residents make use of them. The regions community radio station, Alive 90.5, broadcasts from studios and a transmission tower in the suburb.

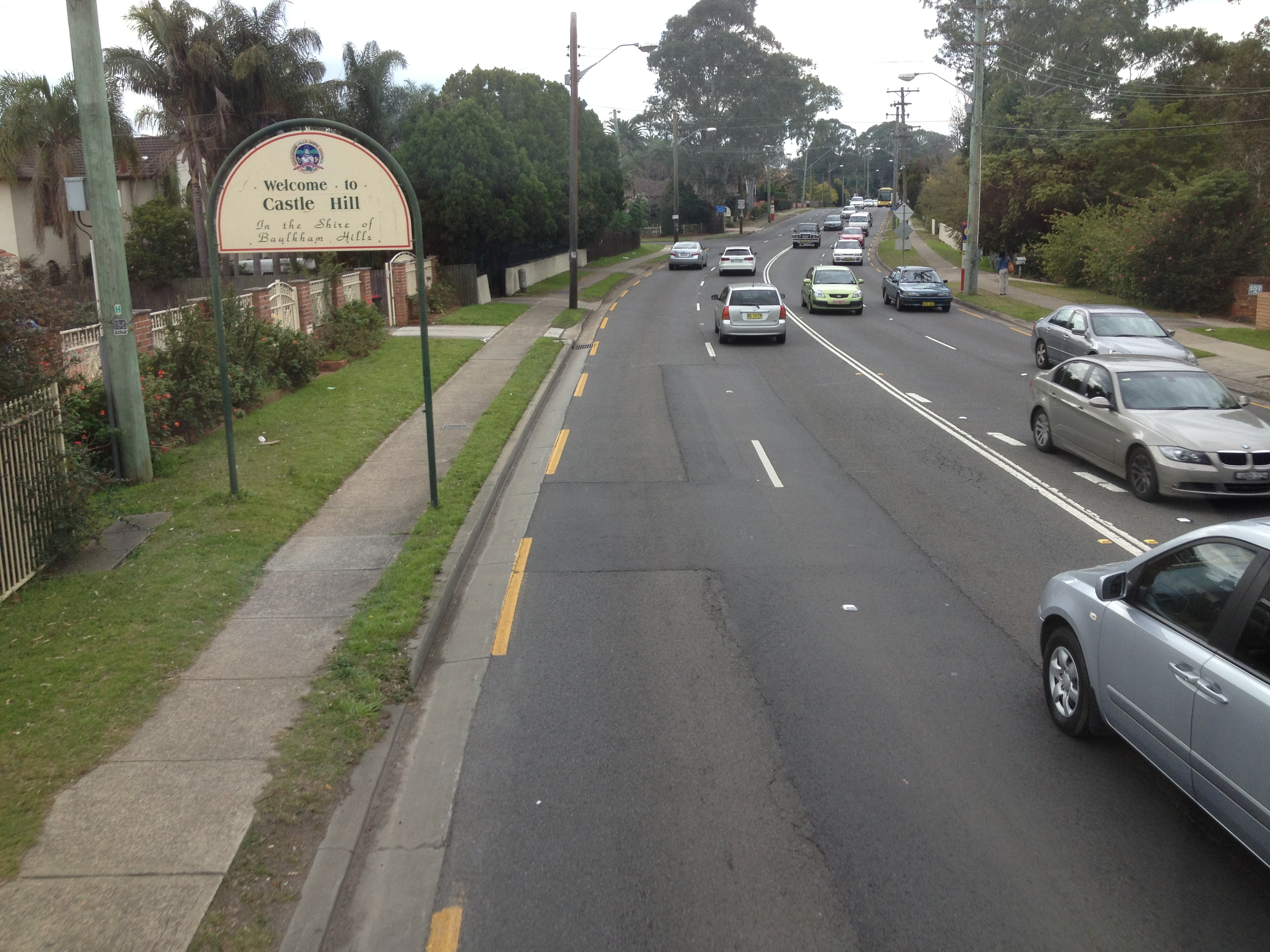
Old Northern Road at Baulkham Hills

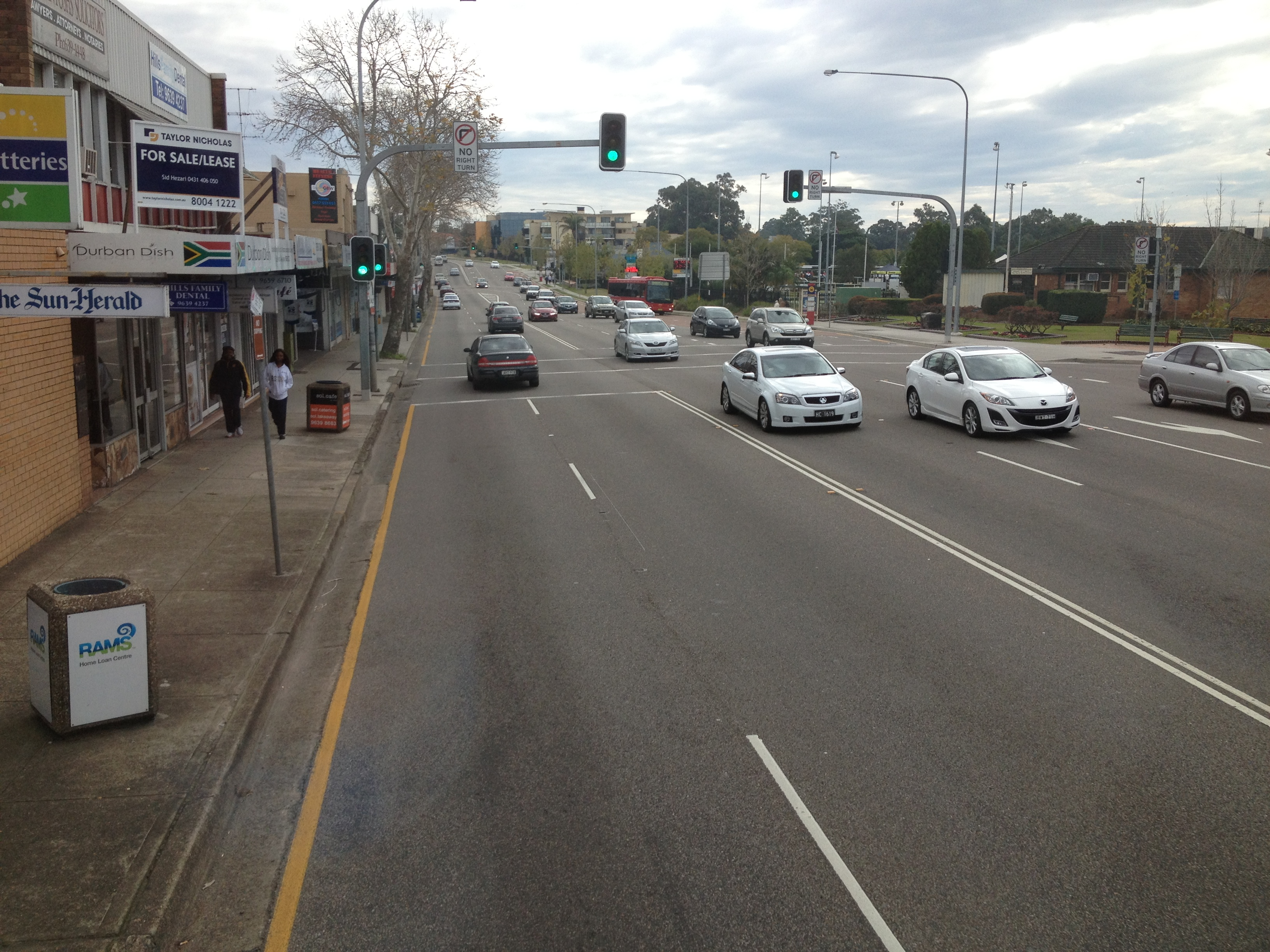
Old Northern Road at Baulkham Hills

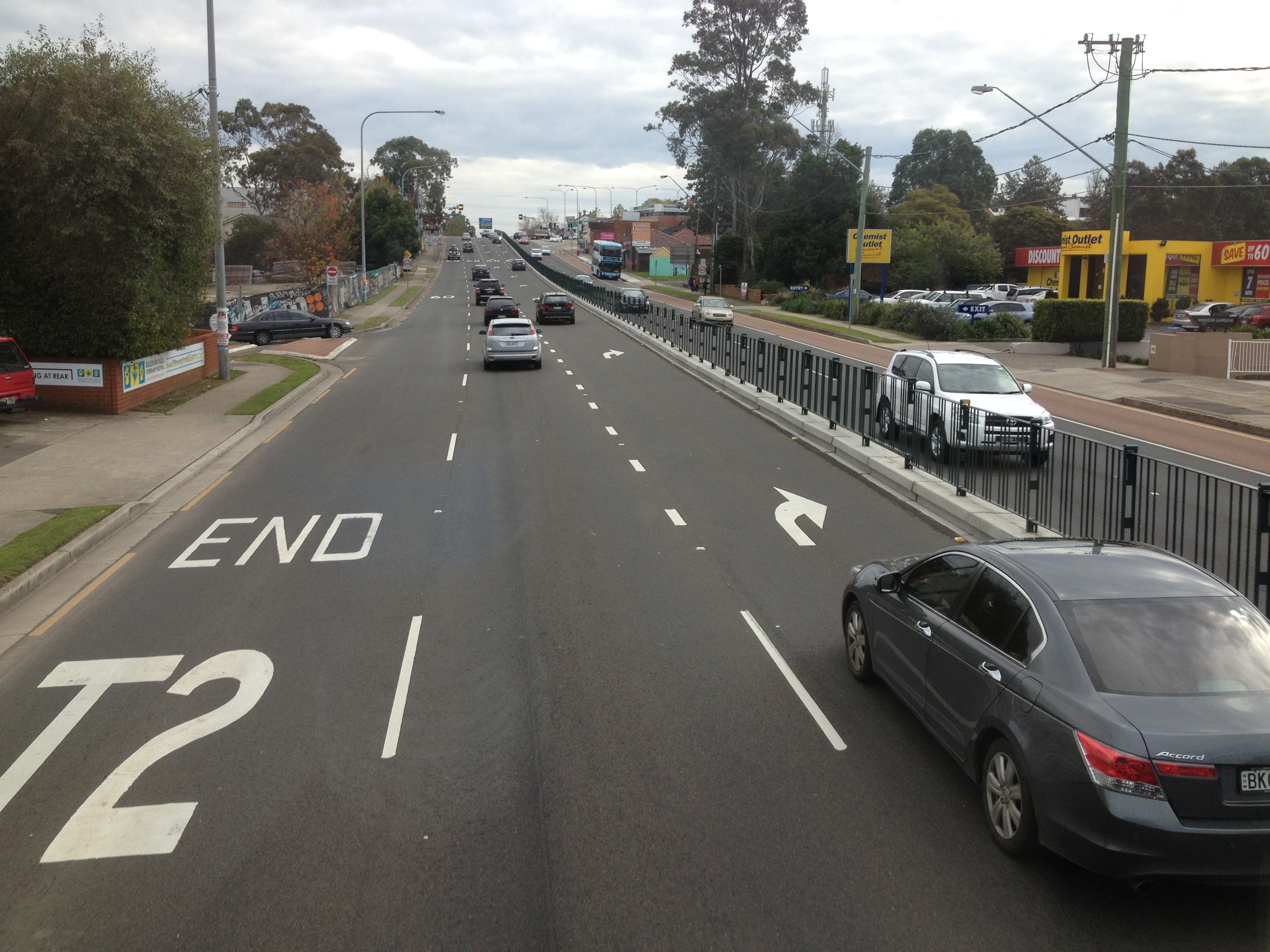
Windsor Road at Baulkham Hills

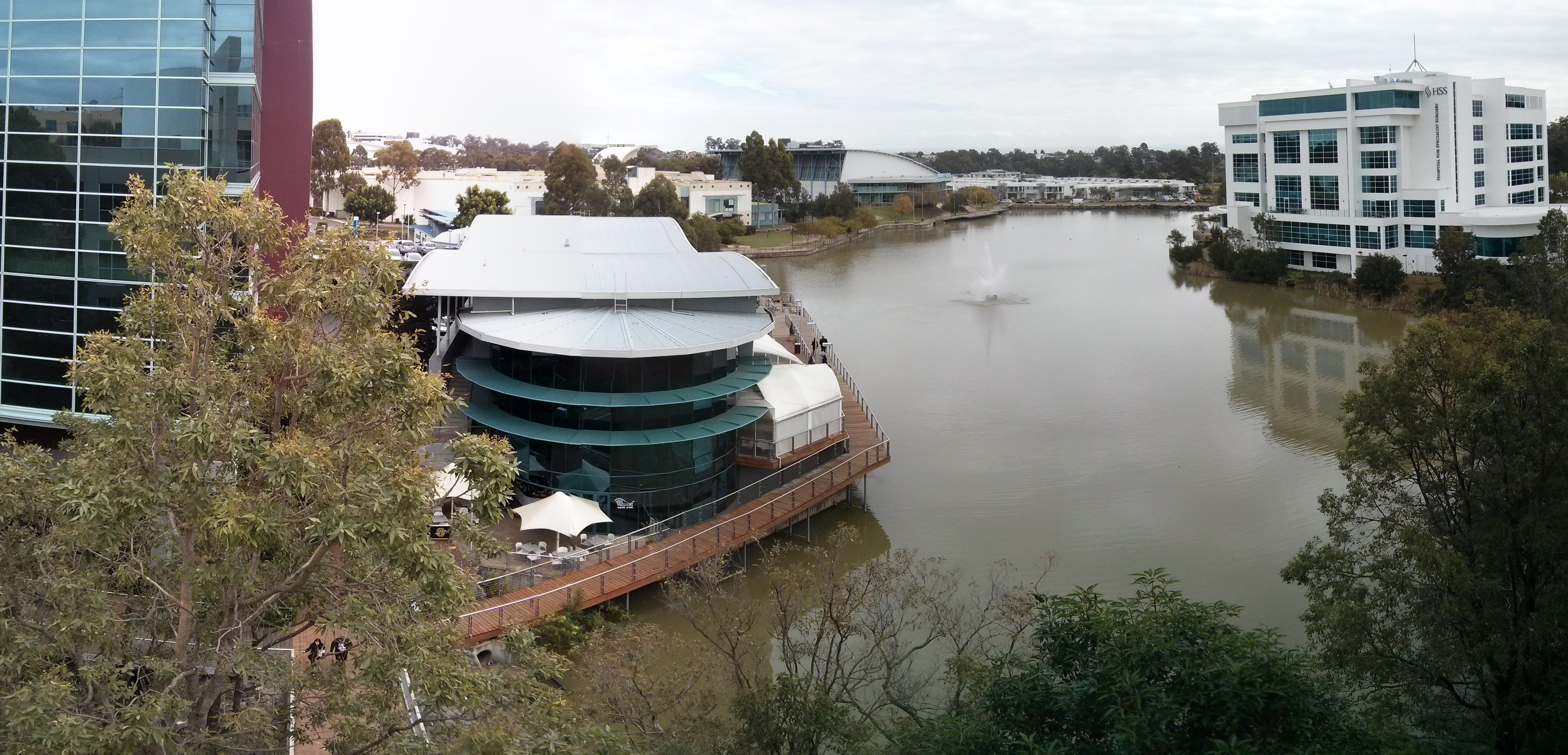
Norwest Lake

=== Events ===
The annual Orange Blossom Festival is held in Baulkham Hills Shire each September. The HYPE Festival is held every April during National Youth Week and again in September during the Orange Blossom festival and attracts large crowds of youths each year. It has featured high-profile Australian music acts such as Gerling, Something With Numbers, Parkway Drive, and The Getaway Plan.

== Notable residents ==
- Doug Bollinger, cricketer
- Adam Bugarija, soccer player
- Tom Burton, Sailor and Olympic Gold Medalist
- Delta Goodrem, pop singer and actress.
- Denise Hofman, co-author of "Forever Nine", a study of Michael Guider
- Joshua Katz (born 1997), Olympic judoka
- Jackson Khoury (born 2002), footballer
- Nick Phipps, rugby union player
- Jana Pittman, Olympic athlete
- Mitchell Starc, cricketer
- Brandon Starc, high jumper
- Ray Warren, TV personality and football commentator
- Josh Heuston, Actor
