= Hunts Creek =

- Location of the creek mouth in Greater metropolitan Sydney

Location
- Country: Australia
- State: New South Wales
- Region: Sydney basin (IBRA)
- Local government areas: The Hills Shire; City of Parramatta

Physical characteristics
- Source
  - location: Carlingford
- Mouth: Darling Mills Creek
  - location: North Parramatta
  - coordinates: 33°47′S 150°58′E

Basin features
- River system: Parramatta River catchment

Hunts Creek, an urban watercourse that is part of the Parramatta River catchment, is located in Greater Western Sydney, New South Wales, Australia.

== Course ==
Hunts Creek rises in the northern suburbs of Sydney, near the south-west corner of the intersection of North Rocks Road and Pennant Hills Road within the suburb of Carlingford and generally flows south-west through Lake Parramatta to its confluence with Darling Mills Creek near the intersection of North Rocks Road and Church Street North Parramatta.

== History ==
In 1818 William Seville was 'granted fifty acres of land at Broken Back Ridge' bounded by the creek. Following the death of William, his son Joseph Seville was granted the land and transferred 25 acres to his sister, Elizabeth Hunt (née Seville) in 1833. He subsequently granted land in 1836 to his brother-in-law Samuel Hunt, after whom the creek is named.

Hunts Creek provided the water supply for Parramatta and the surrounding district between 1856 and 1909.

== See also ==
- Rivers of New South Wales
