= Bidjigal Reserve =

Nature reserve in New South Wales, Australia

The Bidjigal Reserve is a 186-hectare (460-acre) reserve in New South Wales, Australia. It lies mainly within The Hills Shire, with a small section south of the M2 Motorway in the City of Parramatta. The reserve lies in the suburbs of North Rocks, Northmead, Baulkham Hills, Castle Hill, West Pennant Hills, and Carlingford.

The reserve is geographically defined by significant landmarks: to the North lies Castle Hill Road, a major thoroughfare traversing suburban Sydney; to the South, it is bordered by James Ruse Drive, a key arterial road in the Northmead area; on the eastern boundary, Oakes Road in West Pennant Hills marks the edge of the reserve, offering access from the surrounding residential areas; and to the West, the reserve meets Eric Mobbs Reserve at Castle Hill, providing a recreational and natural space for the local community.

== Name ==
Its name commemorates the Bidjigal people who lived in the area. In particular, it is said that Pemulwuy, a Bidjigal leader of aboriginal resistance against British occupation, used the area as a base to mount attacks on neighbouring homesteads. The reserve includes a long section of Darling Mills Creek, a tributary of the Parramatta River, and once an important source of water both to the mills in Parramatta, and for drinking.

== Features ==
The reserve includes a number of walking trails which range from short circular walks up to walks of several kilometres in length, some of which join onto the Great North Walk.

The reserve is home to a wide range of native flora and fauna. It includes a rich diversity of vegetation which includes remnants of Blue Gum High Forest and ridgetop woodlands, but mostly consists of dry sandstone gully forest on sandstone base soils with some areas retaining Wianamatta Shales. The rich understorey includes interesting species like Native Iris (Patersonia glabrata), Native Grape (Cissus hypoglauca) and the Red Beard Orchid (Calochilus paludosus). In recent years there have been reliable recordings of koala, swamp wallaby, echidna, eastern water dragon, and sugar gliders, as well as the ubiquitous brushtail and ringtail possums. Powerful owls have also been seen in the reserve. Foxes have been largely eradicated by a continuing baiting program, leading to a significant increase in the number of native animals in the reserve. The reserve is also known for its abundance and diversity of fungi.

The reserve also includes a local landmark (known locally as the Aboriginal Cave) at Latitude -33.758010 Longitude 151.011660 which is a rock shelter that was apparently described in times of early European occupation as being a cave used by the Bidjigal people. Several other aboriginal rock shelters also lie within Bidjigal Reserve, including one with a midden dated to 10150 bp, which is the earliest human habitation site known in the Sydney area (although older sites are known in the Blue Mountains). There are also reliable reports of other works of Australian aboriginal art, including hand stencils and rock engravings, but none have been identified in recent years, and they may have been damaged or destroyed.

== History and management ==
On 15 September 2001, an agreement was reached between the Government of New South Wales, Baulkham Hills Shire Council and descendants of the Darug to settle an outstanding native title claim (N94/6)which dated back to 1994.

The Darling Mills State Forest and Excelsior Park (with the exception of the Ted Horwood Reserve and the Eric Mobbs Reserve) were combined and made into the Bidjigal Reserve by a deed of agreement signed on 4 December 2003 on behalf of the Minister for Lands. Signatories to that deed were the Crown, Baulkham Hills Shire Council and Bundeluk of the Darug tribe. Other signatories were Telstra and Integral Energy (due to the presence of their infrastructure in the reserve). The Forestry (Darling Mills State Forest Revocation) Bill, which was passed by NSW state government on 2 March 2005 allowed that land to be included in the reserve, as required by the deed.

Bidjigal reserve was dedicated for the purposes of preservation of aboriginal cultural heritage, flora and fauna and public recreation on 22 October 2004.

Ownership of the reserve is vested in the Bidjigal Reserve Trust.

The reserve is managed by the Bidjigal Reserve Trust Board. The first Bidjigal Reserve Trust Board meeting was held on 4 March 2005. The first Board consisted of 4 individual trustees. They were appointed by the Crown Lands minister, for a 5-year term. Those individuals consisted of both Darug descendants, and also local residents. In addition, the secretaries of the Darug Custodians Aboriginal Corporation and the Darug Tribal Aboriginal Corporation, the general manager of Baulkham Hills Shire Council (BHSC), the secretary of the Bushland Conservation Committee (BCC) (of BHSC) and the secretary of the Upper Parramatta River Catchment Trust (now the Sydney Metropolitan Catchment Management Authority), or their delegates were also members of the Board. A representative of the Excelsior Park Bushland Society was later added to the Board Members. That structure still remains, excepting that the trustees now have been increased in number to 6. The first chair of the board was Graeme Postlethwaite, and the second, Carol Isaacs (also chair of the BCC). David Wilmshurst (also BCC member, and Ms Isaac's proxy) was elected the third chair, with Carol Isaacs as deputy chair on 3 April 2008. The second Trust Board met for the first time on 12 February 2010. At that meeting, David Wilmshurst was again elected chair, with Carol Isaacs as deputy. At the AGM on 9 February 2011, Steven Brett was elected the fourth chair, unopposed. Michael Cameron was elected deputy chair.

On 1 December 2007, BHSC resigned its membership of the Board, citing issues related to the funding of crown land.

== See also ==
- Protected areas of New South Wales
