= Muirfield High School =

Location
- New South Wales; Australia; 33°45′52″S 151°1′20″E

Information
- Type: Public, secondary, co-educational, day school
- Motto: One World
- Established: 1976
- Principal: Jennifer Reeves
- Enrolment: 812
- Campus: Suburban
- Colours: Green and purple
- Website: muirfield-h.schools.nsw.gov.au

Muirfield High School is a public, co-educational, secondary day school located in North Rocks, a north-western suburb of Sydney, Australia.

Established in 1976 and operated by the New South Wales Department of Education, Muirfield is a non-selective school catering for approximately 738 students from Years 7 to 12.

== History ==
Muirfield High School opened in 1976 as a comprehensive, co-educational high school.

In 1989 the school was identified as one of twenty-six technology high schools in New South Wales, becoming one of the first Public schools in New South Wales to introduce computers into the curriculum. The aim of the 'Technology High School' was to produce "technologically-literate people" and to give an advantage to students who are seeking a career in computing or technology-based industries. Additionally over the past five years (2014–2018) the school has had a student in the top ten of State for the HSC/TAFE course Information & Digital Technolroduce, and livestock.

== Alumni ==
- Scott Tunkin – Australian Olympic Baseballer
- Andrew Crews – NSL Footballer
- Kieren Briggs – GWS Giants AFL Footballer
- Chad Staples – Zookeeper at Featherdale Wildlife Park
- Tom Burton – Olympic Gold Medalist (Sailing)
- Aideen Keane – athlete and footballer for Sydney FC (A-League Women) in the A-League Women
- Max Magnay – Professional frisbee player for Reef Sharks in the AFDA Frisbee League.

== See also ==
- List of government schools in New South Wales
