= North Parramatta =

- Suburb
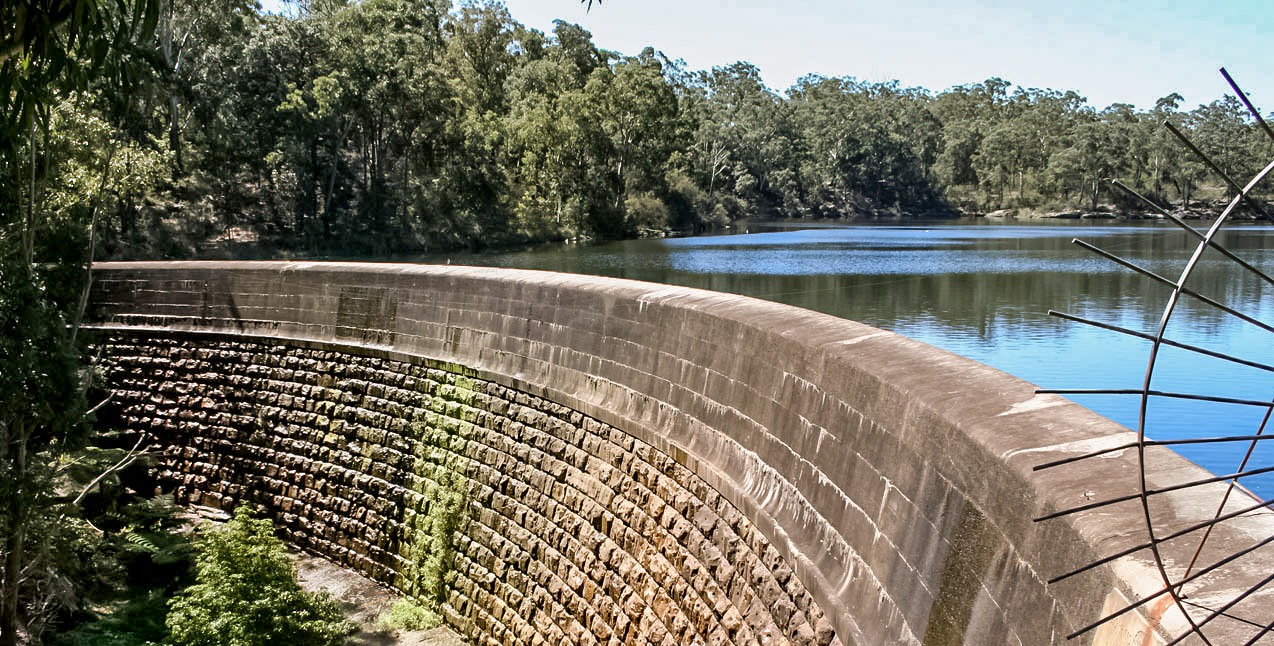
- Masonry arch wall at Lake Parramatta

- Interactive map of North Parramatta
- Country: Australia
- State: New South Wales
- LGA: City of Parramatta
- Location: 24 km (15 mi) north-west of Sydney CBD

Government
  - State electorates: Epping; Parramatta
  - Federal division: Parramatta

Area
  - Total: 5.2 km^{2} (2.0 sq mi)
- Elevation: 39 m (128 ft)

Population
  - Total: 12,064 (2021 census)
  - Density: 2,320/km^{2} (6,010/sq mi)
- Postcode: 2151
Suburbs around North Parramatta
Northmead	North Rocks	Carlingford
Northmead	North Parramatta	Oatlands
Westmead	Parramatta	Rydalmere

North Parramatta is a suburb of Sydney, in the state of New South Wales, Australia. North Parramatta is 24 kilometres (15 mi) north-west of the Sydney central business district in the local government area of the City of Parramatta.

== History ==
The Darug people had lived in the area for many generations, and regarded the area as a food bowl, rich in food from the river and forests. They called the area Baramada or Burramatta ('Parramatta') which means "the place where the eels lie down".

== Heritage listings ==
North Parramatta has a number of heritage-listed sites, including:

- 28a Bourke Street: Lake Parramatta
- Corner of O'Connell Street and Dunlop Street: Parramatta Correctional Centre
- Pennant Hills Road: St Patrick's Cemetery

The UrbanGrowth NSW Development Corporation is working on creating an aspirational place identity for the publicly owned and nationally listed Heritage Core. It will not have any residential developments, and the heritage buildings will be preserved with the help of repair and restoration work that will make them weatherproof and safe. The significant landmarks on the site which will be conserved include the Cumberland Hospital and the Norma Parker Centre.

== Schools and recreation ==
North Parramatta is dominated by Lake Parramatta and The King's School, which together comprise almost 50% of the land area. Lake Parramatta is a 10-hectare reserve, based around a former reservoir. The catchment area for the lake is bounded by North Rocks Road, Pennant Hills Road and Hunts Creek. The entrance is from Lackey Street, North Parramatta. Lake Parramatta served as a recreational spot for locals who enjoyed swimming. It had been closed due to pollution, but was reopened in January 2015.

Schools in the suburb include:

- Burnside Public School
- Parramatta North Public School
- Redeemer Baptist School – situated on a heritage-listed area – former site of Burnside Orphanage
- RIDBC Garfield Barwick School
- Tara Anglican School for Girls
- The King's School, Parramatta, the oldest independent school in Australia
- St. Monica's Primary School

== Transport ==
North Parramatta contains L4 Light Rail stops Benaud Oval and Ngara, which opened in 2024 as part of the Parramatta Light Rail.

The nearest train station to North Parramatta is Parramatta railway station. The 609 bus route, run by Hillsbus, is the local access to bus transport. It circles around from Prince Street, to Gloucester Avenue, past Lake Parramatta, onto Iron Street and then to the Parramatta Bus Interchange.

At the 2011 census, 21.9% of employed people travelled to work on public transport and 57.3% by car (either as driver or as passenger).

== Demographics ==
Historical population
Year	Pop.	±%
2001	8,710	—
2006	8,365	−4.0%
2011	12,594	+50.6%
2016	13,248	+5.2%
2021	12,064	−8.9%

At the 2021 census, North Parramatta recorded a population of 12,064. Of these:

Age distribution
North Parramatta has a slight over-representation of young adults when compared to the country as a whole. This is most apparent in the range 25–39 years of age, who make up 26.3% of the suburb's population, larger than the national average of 21.5%. North Parramatta residents' median age was 38 years, the same as the national median. Children aged 0–14 years made up 17.1% of the population (national average is 18.2%) and people aged 65 years and over made up 13.7% of the population (national average is 17.2%).
Ethnic diversity
About half (47.4%) of North Parramatta residents were born in Australia; the next most common countries of birth were India 8.8%, China 5.0%, Philippines 3.0%, Iran 2.8% and Lebanon 2.3%. However, only 16.5% identify their ancestry as Australian, which is the second-largest group; the next most common self-identified ancestries were English 16.8%, Chinese 11.1%, Indian 9.7% and Lebanese 7.0%. Just under half (46.9%) of people only spoke English at home; other languages spoken at home included Arabic 5.9%, Mandarin 5.4%, Hindi 3.5%, Cantonese 3.0% and Persian (excluding Dari) 2.8%.
Religion
The most common responses for religion were No Religion 23.8% and Catholic 23.6%.
Income
The average weekly household income was $1,703, compared to the national average of $1,746.
Housing
Most private dwellings (58.2%) were flats, units or apartments. Another 24.2% were separate houses, while 17.2% were semi-detached (mainly townhouses). The average household size was 2.3 people.

== See also ==
- Lake Parramatta, a recreational area and a swimming spot in the suburb
