= Electoral results for the district of Epping =

Election results for Epping, New South Wales, Australia

Epping, an electoral district of the Legislative Assembly in the Australian state of New South Wales, has existed since 1999.

== Members for Epping ==
Election	Member	Party
1999	Andrew Tink	Liberal
2003	Andrew Tink	Liberal
2007	Greg Smith	Liberal
2011	Greg Smith	Liberal
2015	Damien Tudehope	Liberal
2019	Dominic Perrottet	Liberal
2023	Dominic Perrottet	Liberal
2024 by	Monica Tudehope	Liberal

== Election results ==
=== Elections in the 2020s ===
==== 2024 by-election ====
2024 Epping by-election
Party	Candidate	Votes	%	±%
Liberal	Monica Tudehope	25,439	57.08	+8.14
Greens	Duncan Voyage	10,851	24.35	+13.79
Independent	Edgar Lu	4,602	10.33	+10.33
Independent	Dezhong (Jerry) Wang	2,435	5.46	+5.46
Libertarian	Rob Cribb	1,240	2.78	+2.78
Total formal votes		44,567	96.60	−1.00
Informal votes		1,569	3.40	+1.00
Turnout		46,136	77.01	−13.69
Two-candidate-preferred result
Liberal	Monica Tudehope	27,010	69.22	+14.46
Greens	Duncan Voyage	12,011	30.78	+30.78
Liberal hold		Swing	N/A	

==== 2023 ====
2023 New South Wales state election: Epping
Party	Candidate	Votes	%	±%
Liberal	Dominic Perrottet	25,439	48.9	−5.4
Labor	Alan Mascarenhas	17,599	33.9	+5.4
Greens	Phil Bradley	5,489	10.6	+0.7
Independent	Victor Waterson	1,322	2.5	+2.5
Animal Justice	Carmen Terceiro	1,091	2.1	+2.1
Sustainable Australia	Bradley Molloy	1,045	2.0	+2.0
Total formal votes		51,985	97.6	+0.2
Informal votes		1,279	2.4	−0.2
Turnout		53,264	90.7	−1.3
Two-party-preferred result
Liberal	Dominic Perrottet	26,648	54.8	−6.5
Labor	Alan Mascarenhas	22,013	45.2	+6.5
Liberal hold		Swing	−6.5	

=== Elections in the 2010s ===
==== 2019 ====
2019 New South Wales state election: Epping
Party	Candidate	Votes	%	±%
Liberal	Dominic Perrottet	27,506	55.88	+1.54
Labor	Alan Mascarenhas	13,652	27.73	+8.04
Greens	Simon Margan	5,143	10.45	−3.69
Independent	Victor Waterson	1,544	3.14	+3.14
Keep Sydney Open	Samuel Lyndon	1,379	2.80	+2.80
Total formal votes		49,224	97.73	+0.19
Informal votes		1,145	2.27	−0.19
Turnout		50,369	92.44	−0.65
Two-party-preferred result
Liberal	Dominic Perrottet	28,584	62.38	−3.85
Labor	Alan Mascarenhas	17,238	37.62	+3.85
Liberal hold		Swing	−3.85	

==== 2015 ====
2015 New South Wales state election: Epping
Party	Candidate	Votes	%	±%
Liberal	Damien Tudehope	26,917	54.3	−8.4
Labor	David Havyatt	9,757	19.7	+5.2
Greens	Emma Heyde	7,001	14.1	+1.9
Independent	Kerry Fox	3,317	6.7	+6.7
Christian Democrats	Darryl Allen	1,878	3.8	−0.1
No Land Tax	Sophia Kong	664	1.3	+1.3
Total formal votes		49,534	97.5	+0.5
Informal votes		1,250	2.5	−0.5
Turnout		50,784	93.1	−1.6
Two-party-preferred result
Liberal	Damien Tudehope	29,201	66.2	−11.3
Labor	David Havyatt	14,890	33.8	+11.3
Liberal hold		Swing	−11.3	

==== 2011 ====
2011 New South Wales state election: Epping
Party	Candidate	Votes	%	±%
Liberal	Greg Smith	27,543	61.4	+18.6
Labor	Amy Smith	7,142	15.9	−10.0
Greens	Emma Heyde	6,691	14.9	+2.7
Christian Democrats	John Kingsmill	1,775	4.0	−0.3
Independent	Victor Waterson	1,162	2.6	+2.6
Family First	John Thomas	542	1.2	+1.2
Total formal votes		44,855	97.5	−0.1
Informal votes		1,150	2.5	+0.1
Turnout		46,005	93.1	+0.4
Two-party-preferred result
Liberal	Greg Smith	29,881	75.2	+17.2
Labor	Amy Smith	9,868	24.8	−17.2
Liberal hold		Swing	+17.2	

=== Elections in the 2000s ===
==== 2007 ====
2007 New South Wales state election: Epping
Party	Candidate	Votes	%	±%
Liberal	Greg Smith	18,283	42.8	−3.7
Labor	Nicole Campbell	11,087	25.9	−2.8
Greens	Lindsay Peters	5,229	12.2	+1.2
Independent	Martin Levine	2,327	5.4	+5.4
Unity	Simon Tam	2,037	4.8	−0.5
Christian Democrats	John Kingsmill	1,807	4.2	−0.1
Democrats	David Havyatt	741	1.7	−0.2
Independent	Christina Metlikovec	717	1.7	+1.7
Against Further Immigration	Michael Bergman	528	1.2	−0.6
Total formal votes		42,756	97.6	−0.5
Informal votes		1,066	2.4	+0.5
Turnout		43,822	92.7	
Two-party-preferred result
Liberal	Greg Smith	21,052	58.0	+0.4
Labor	Nicole Campbell	15,253	42.0	−0.4
Liberal hold		Swing	+0.4	

==== 2003 ====
2003 New South Wales state election: Epping
Party	Candidate	Votes	%	±%
Liberal	Andrew Tink	18,452	45.6	+1.5
Labor	Mark Lyons	11,705	28.9	−0.6
Greens	Matthew Benson	4,510	11.1	+5.4
Unity	David Chan	2,453	6.1	+0.7
Christian Democrats	Owen Nannelli	1,765	4.4	−0.2
Against Further Immigration	David Mudgee	792	2.0	+0.9
Democrats	Philip Sparks	784	1.9	−4.6
Total formal votes		40,461	98.0	−0.4
Informal votes		814	2.0	+0.4
Turnout		41,275	91.5	
Two-party-preferred result
Liberal	Andrew Tink	20,458	56.9	−0.2
Labor	Mark Lyons	15,524	43.1	+0.2
Liberal hold		Swing	−0.2	

=== Elections in the 1990s ===
==== 1999 ====
1999 New South Wales state election: Epping
Party	Candidate	Votes	%	±%
Liberal	Andrew Tink	17,862	44.1	−13.7
Labor	Steve Gurney	11,937	29.5	+5.2
Democrats	Rachael Jacobs	2,638	6.5	−1.6
Greens	Jamie Parker	2,319	5.7	+1.5
Unity	Sung Yoo	2,171	5.4	+5.4
Christian Democrats	Owen Nanelli	1,854	4.6	+4.3
One Nation	Harry Ball	1,274	3.1	+3.1
Against Further Immigration	Peter Bell	461	1.1	−3.6
Total formal votes		40,516	98.4	+1.6
Informal votes		660	1.6	−1.6
Turnout		41,176	92.6	
Two-party-preferred result
Liberal	Andrew Tink	20,512	57.1	−9.6
Labor	Steve Gurney	15,434	42.9	+9.6
Liberal notional hold		Swing	−9.6	
