= Icare =

Icare may refer to:

- icare (insurance), state insurance company in New South Wales, Australia
- Eçara, village in Azerbaijan
- iCare Foodbank, a food bank in Nigeria
- ICARE Institute of Medical Sciences and Research, medical college in India founded by Indian Centre for Advancement of Research and Education

== See also ==
- , including various titles using the French name for Icarus
- I Care (disambiguation)
