= Cumberland State Forest (New South Wales) =

State forest in Australia

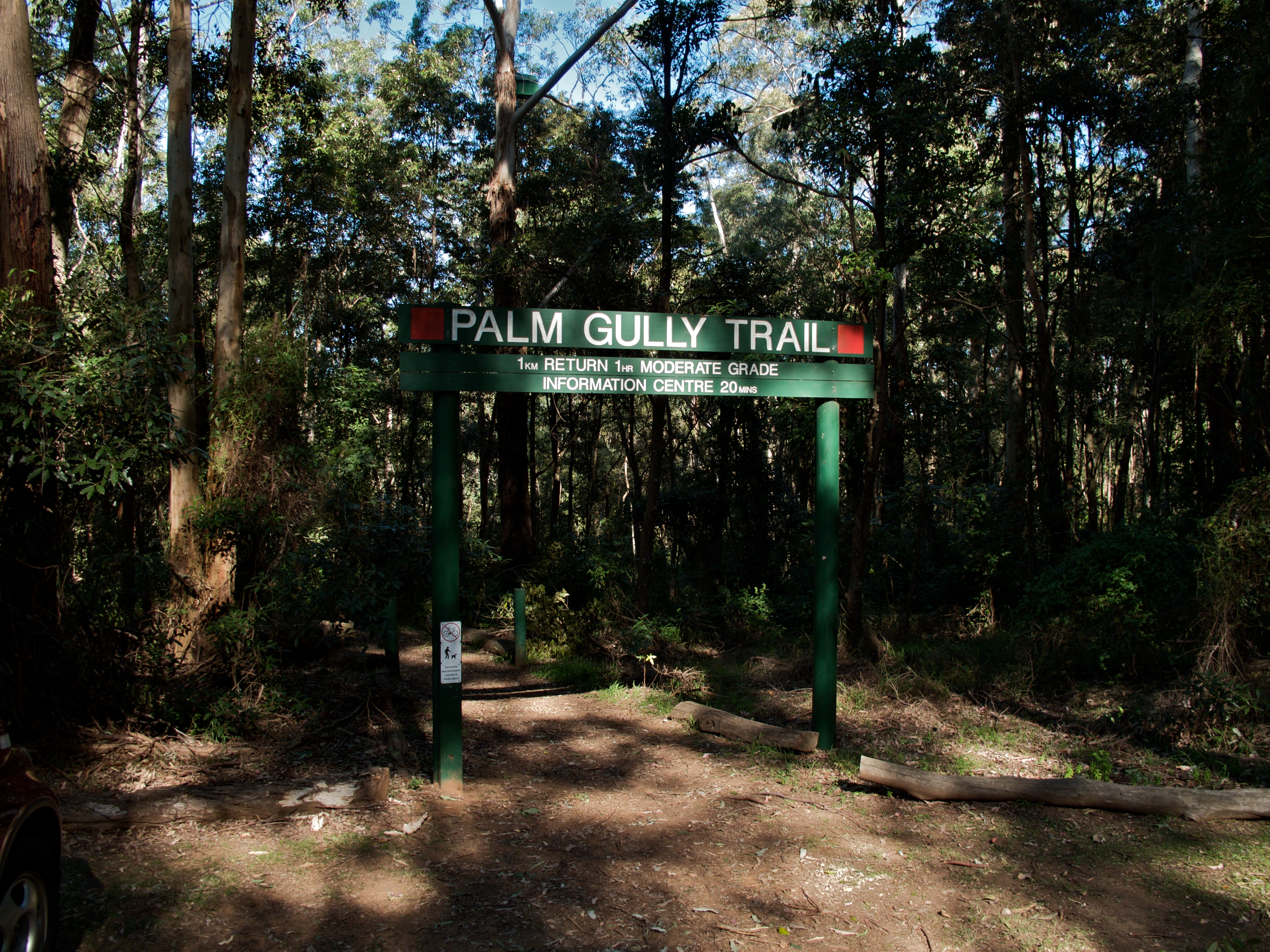
- Entry to the Palm Gully Trail
- Interactive map of Cumberland State Forest

Geography
- Location: West Pennant Hills, Sydney, New South Wales, Australia
- Coordinates: 33°44′37″S 151°2′21.98″E
- Area: 39.57 ha (0.4 km^{2}; 0.2 mi^{2})

Administration
- Established: 1939
- Authority: Forestry Corporation of NSW

Ecology
- Dominant tree species: Sydney blue gum, blackbutt, grey ironbark, turpentine
- Lesser flora: Forest red gum, Grey gum

Cumberland State Forest is a wet sclerophyll forest in Sydney, New South Wales, Australia. Situated on the southern edge of the Hornsby Plateau, the forest is located in the suburb of West Pennant Hills, Sydney and contains 40 hectares of native forest. It is the only metropolitan state forest in Australia and it is considered unique in comparison to the other state forests of NSW. The forest receives about 150,000 visitors annually.

== History ==
The original land was privately owned and was cleared in 1908. In 1937, the Commissioner for Forests, Mr E.H.F Swain, ordered that a search be conducted in Sydney for an area appropriate for cultivation of ornamental trees and for forest research. In 1938, the land was purchased and management of the area was assigned to the New South Wales Forestry Commission. It was dedicated as a state forest in 1939. Seedlings were planted in 1939 and the bulk of them were established by 1944.

In the 1940s, local and exotic tree species were planted on considerably cleared areas of the forest for scientific study. One third of the site was established as an arboretum, whereas the remainder of the site was allowed to regenerate on its own. The arboretum was initially planted in the eastern region of the forest and later plantings were conducted near a creek to preserve the rainforest gullies.

What is seen today is more than 65 years of forest growth, where it predominantly features secondary forest ecosystems. Some older trees have developed tree hollows, which are used by many arboreal animals.

== Recreation ==
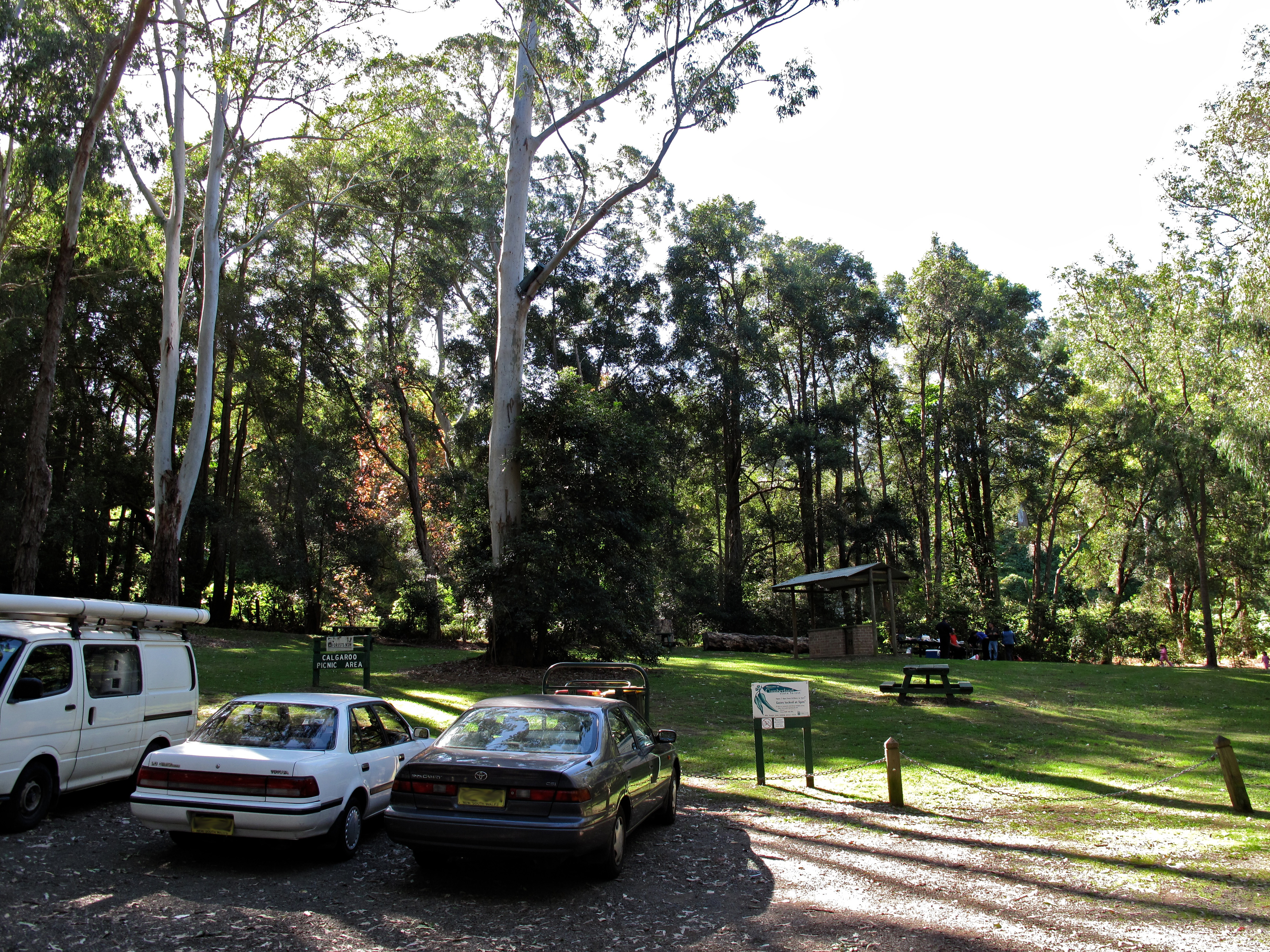
Picnic area and parking

In addition to four picnic areas, a number of walking tracks (which are 2.8 km long and feature a trail difficulty rating system) can be explored by visitors who can enjoy the onsite cafe or use the picnic and barbecue facilities. As of December 2016, TreeTops Adventure Park, a high ropes course, has been operating within Cumberland State Forest. The Forestry Corporation of NSW runs volunteer and school holiday activities programs within the forest.

The 3.4 km long sealed road provides a scenic tour through the forest and is suited for two-wheel drive vehicles. On average about 1500 vehicles enter the forest from Castle Hill Road on a weekly basis, with the busiest months for visitors being from October to February. The forest is situated less than 2km away from major roads like Pennant Hills Road, the Cumberland Highway and the M2 motorway, with the main entry being from Castle Hill Road and Oratava Avenue.

== Geography ==
The forest is located south of the ridge between Berowra Creek and the Parramatta River, where it forms a wildlife corridor between the Lake Parramatta Reserve and Berowra Valley National Park. The forest is bounded on three sides by residential homes and by MIRVAC Corporate Facility on the western part The forest features both Dry Sclerophyll Forest (shrubby sub formation) and Wet Sclerophyll Forest vegetation. The forest features vegetation found in the Blue Gum High Forest and Sydney Turpentine-Ironbark Forest.

The northern part of the forest is generally composed of blue gum (Eucalyptus saligna) and grey ironbark (Eucalyptus paniculata), related to the soils that are traced from the Wianamatta Shale. In the southern part, there is more cover and thus the sandstone influence prevails, where turpentine (Syncarpia glomulifera) becomes more prominent and blue gum less common.

=== Geology ===
The forest lies on the southwestern slope of the Hornsby Plateau, where it sits on the intersection between the Hawkesbury sandstone and the superimposed Wianamatta shale, thereby generating two contrasting soil types and three paramount forest associations. The northern portion of the forest indicates its shale roots in a softly undulating topography, whereas the southern region feature outcrops and minor cliffs accordant with the sandstone geology which seem evident.

== Facilities ==
There are several facilities within the forest, which include two forest cottages, Plants Plus Nursery (a plant nursery store), Forestry Corporation Visitor Centre, Forestry Corporation Corporate Facility, TreeTops Adventure Park and Cafe Saligna, a café bar. The forest also has infrastructure such as two telecommunication towers, belowground power, water and waste installations, a public entry and exit driveways, in addition to a large walking path and fire trail system.

== Species ==
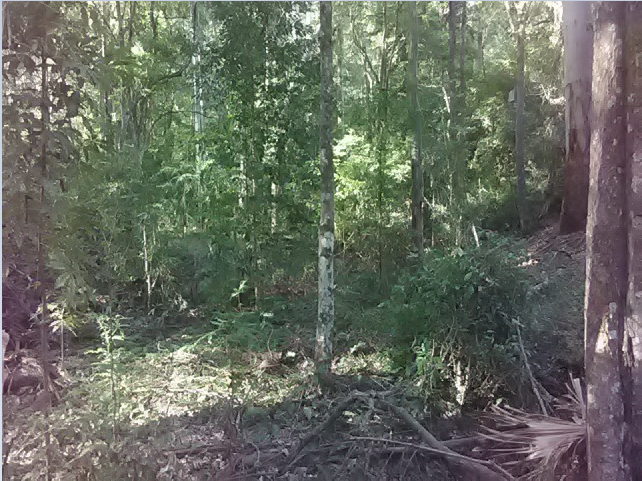
Watergum tree in the forest

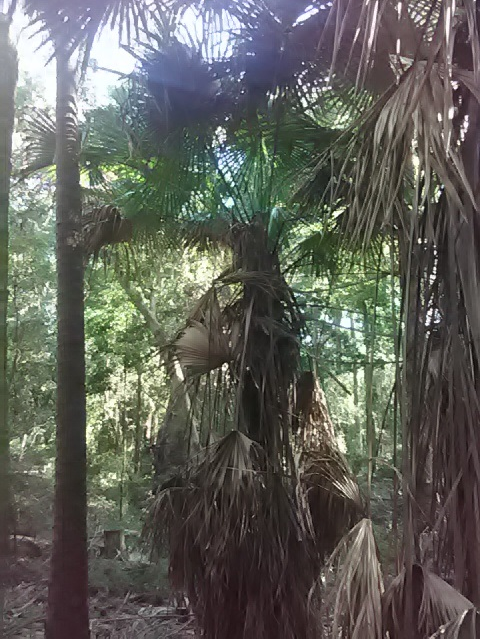
Cabbage tree palm

Tree species in the forest include:

- Elaeocarpus reticulatus
- Glochidion ferdinandi
- Pittosporum undulatum
- Eucalyptus saligna
- Eucalyptus pilularis
- Eucalyptus crebra
- Eucalyptus punctata
- Eucalyptus fibrosa
- Corymbia maculata
- Syncarpia glomulifera

Species in the arboretum include, some of which are rare rainforest trees in natural occurrence:

- Araucaria cunninghamii
- Araucaria bidwillii
- Araucaria heterophylla
- Austrobuxus swainii
- Choricarpia subargentea
- Eucalyptus curtisii
- Eucalyptus guilfoylei
- Eucalyptus kartzoffiana
- Eucalyptus macarthurii
- Eucalyptus rummeryi
- Eucalyptus scoparia
- Eucalyptus squamosa
- Ficus coronata
- Livistona australis
- Tristaniopsis laurina

Cumberland State Forest is not home to any threatened flora species.

=== Fauna ===
Threatened fauna species present in the forest include:

- Ninox strenua
- Mormopterus norfolkensis
- Scoteanax rueppellii
- Miniopterus australis
- Saccolaimus flaviventris
- Miniopterus schreibersii
- Pteropus poliocephalus
- Lathamus discolor
- Artamus cyanopterus
- Daphoenositta chrysoptera
- Glossopsitta pusilla
- Ptilinopus superbus
- Callocephalon fimbriatum
- Melithreptus gularis

Rabbits, foxes, and lost or estray pets have also been observed in the forest.

== See also ==
- State Forests of New South Wales
