= Ləzran =

Ləzran or Lezran or Lyazan or Lyazran may refer to:

- Ləzran, Jalilabad, Azerbaijan
- Ləzran, Yardymli, Azerbaijan
