= Damien Tudehope =

Australian politician

The Honourable Damien Tudehope MLC
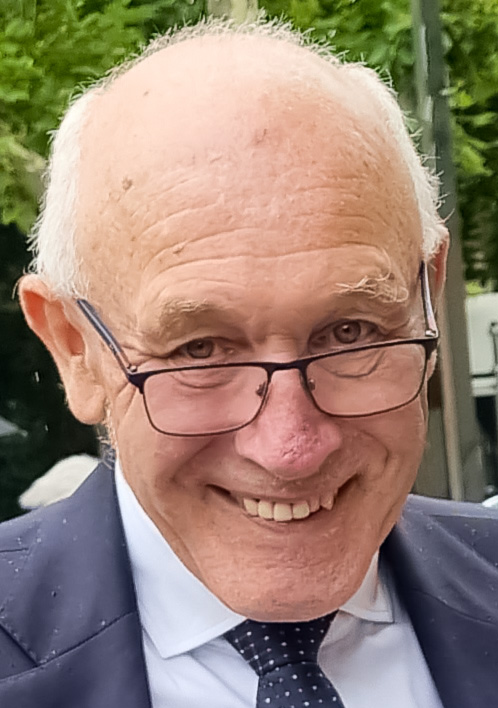
- Tudehope in 2024

Leader of the Opposition in the Legislative Council
- Incumbent
- Assumed office 7 October 2026
- Deputy: Sarah Mitchell
- Leader: Kellie Sloane
- Preceded by: Natalie Ward (acting)
- In office 21 April 2023 – 3 July 2026
- Deputy: Sarah Mitchell
- Leader: Mark Speakman; Kellie Sloane
- Preceded by: Penny Sharpe
- Succeeded by: Natalie Ward (acting)

Leader of the Government in the Legislative Council
- In office 21 December 2021 – 17 February 2023
- Premier: Dominic Perrottet
- Preceded by: Don Harwin
- Succeeded by: Penny Sharpe
- Acting; 15 April 2020 – 3 July 2020
- Premier: Gladys Berejiklian
- Preceded by: Don Harwin
- Succeeded by: Don Harwin

Vice-President of the Executive Council
- In office 21 December 2021 – 17 February 2023
- Premier: Dominic Perrottet
- Preceded by: Don Harwin
- Succeeded by: Sarah Mitchell
Minister (2019-2023)
Minister for Finance
In office 2 April 2019 – 23 February 2023
Premier	Gladys Berejiklian; Dominic Perrottet
Preceded by	Victor Dominello (as Minister for Finance, Services and Property)
Succeeded by	Dominic Perrottet
Minister for Employee Relations
In office 21 December 2021 – 17 February 2023
Premier	Dominic Perrottet
Preceded by	Don Harwin (as Minister for the Public Service and Employee Relations, Aboriginal Affairs, and the Arts)
Succeeded by	Dominic Perrottet
Minister for Small Business
In office 2 April 2019 – 21 December 2021
Premier	Gladys Berejiklian; Dominic Perrottet
Preceded by	John Barilaro
Succeeded by	Eleni Petinos
Constituencies
Member of the New South Wales Legislative Council
Incumbent
Assumed office 23 March 2019
Member of the New South Wales Legislative Assembly for Epping
In office 28 March 2015 – 1 March 2019
Preceded by	Greg Smith
Succeeded by	Dominic Perrottet

Personal details
- Born: 1953 (age 72–73)
- Party: Liberal Party (after 1999)
- Other political affiliations: Australian Family Alliance (1999)
- Children: 9, including Monica
- Education: University of Sydney
- Profession: Solicitor
- Website: damientudehope.com.au

Damien Francis Tudehope (born 1953) is an Australian politician. Tudehope served as the New South Wales Minister for Finance in the second Berejiklian and Perrottet ministries from April 2019 to March 2023. He was also the Minister for Employee Relations, the Vice-President of the Executive Council, and the Leader of the Government in the Legislative Council in the Perrottet ministry since December 2021. Tudehope has been a member of the New South Wales Legislative Council since the 2019 state election, representing the Liberal Party.

Tudehope was the New South Wales Legislative Assembly member for Epping from March 2015 until March 2019, representing the Liberal Party.

== Early life and education ==
Tudehope was educated at the University of Sydney where he received a Bachelor of Arts and a Bachelor of Laws. He has been a small business owner, worked as the chief of staff for the former Attorney-General Greg Smith in the O'Farrell ministry, and as a partner at O'Hara and Company Solicitors.

As a lawyer, Tudehope successfully defended the later-convicted child sex offender priest Finian Egan against sexual abuse charges. Later, as chief of staff to the Attorney General, Tudehope blocked release of material regarding Egan for a subsequent trial. On that occasion in 2013, Egan was represented by Tudehope's brother, Anthony Tudehope. Egan was found guilty and jailed.

== Political career ==
Tudehope acted as spokesperson for the socially conservative Australian Family Association. He was previously the State President of the National Civic Council. He ran against the Liberal Party in 1999 as the Australian Family Alliance candidate for the NSW Legislative Council, and has nominated for the seats of Baulkham Hills, Ryde and Epping for the Liberal Party, although he withdrew each time before the preselection stage.

Tudehope was endorsed by the Liberal Party for the state seat of Epping following Greg Smith's retirement from politics. At the 2015 state election, Tudehope achieved 54.3% of the primary vote, the second-highest primary vote in the history of the seat of Epping. In his inaugural speech, Tudehope cited housing affordability as a key issue that needed addressing. On 3 June 2015 Tudehope was appointed Chair for the Parliamentary Committee on the Independent Commission Against Corruption, and Deputy Chair for the Parliamentary Committee on Children and Young People.

Tudehope opposed the Safe Schools program for gender and sexually diverse topics in New South Wales.

In an agreement reached between Tudehope and Dominic Perrottet, Tudehope agreed to not contest the seat of Epping at the 2019 state election, allowing Perrottet the opportunity to move from Hawkesbury to contest Epping. In exchange, Tudehope sought Liberal Party endorsement for the Legislative Council. However, in November 2018, Liberal Party members voted against the deal. Tudehope eventually gained endorsement and was elected to the Legislative Council in March 2019. Tudehope was appointed as the Minister for Finance and Small Business in April 2019.

In April 2020, Don Harwin resigned from his portfolios including Vice-President of the Executive Council and Leader of the Government in the Legislative Council. Tudehope was appointed Vice-President of the Executive Council and Leader of the Government in the Legislative Council between 15 April 2020 and 3 July 2020, after which Harwin's portfolios were reinstated. Tudehope was then appointed as Leader of the House in the Legislative Council. In the December 2021 rearrangement of the Perrottet ministry, Tudehope was sworn in as the Minister for Finance, the Minister for Employee Relations, the Vice-President of the Executive Council, and the Leader of the Government in the Legislative Council. Tudehope opposed abortion being legalised in New South Wales, claiming it would allow abortion to the moment of birth.

Tudehope sought to move amendments to the act that decriminalised abortion which aimed to ban sex-selective abortions, these amendments were eventually passed into the law.

Tudehope was made shadow attorney general in January 2026 by opposition leader Kellie Sloane. He resigned from this position in July following the Independent Commission Against Corruption's announcement of an investigation into Liberal Party donors and Tudehope being called as a witness in the hearings.

== Personal life ==
Tudehope lives in West Pennant Hills with wife Diane, and has nine children, born between 1979 and 2000, including Monica, Liberal MLA for Epping and former Deputy Chief of Staff and Executive Director Policy to Dominic Perrottet. Tudehope is a Roman Catholic.

== See also ==
- Second Berejiklian ministry
- Perrottet ministry

New South Wales Legislative Assembly
Preceded by Greg Smith	Member for Epping; 2015–2019	Succeeded by Dominic Perrottet
Political offices
Preceded by John Barilaro as Minister for Small Business	Minister for Small Business; 2019–2021	Succeeded by Eleni Petinos as Minister for Small Business
Preceded by Victor Dominello as Minister for Finance, Services and Property	Minister for Finance; 2019–2023	Succeeded by Dominic Perrottet
Preceded by Don Harwin as Minister for the Public Service and Employee Relations, Aboriginal Affairs, and the Arts	Minister for Employee Relations; 2021–2023	Succeeded by Dominic Perrottet
Preceded by Don Harwin	Vice-President of the Executive Council; 2020	Succeeded by Don Harwin
Preceded by Don Harwin	Vice-President of the Executive Council; 2021–2023	Succeeded by Sarah Mitchell
Party political offices
Preceded by Don Harwin	Leader of the Government in the Legislative Council; 2020	Succeeded by Don Harwin
Preceded by Don Harwin	Leader of the Government in the Legislative Council; 2021–2023	Succeeded by Penny Sharpe
