= COVID-19 pandemic in New South Wales =

- Disease: COVID-19
- Pathogen: SARS-CoV-2
- Location: New South Wales, Australia
- First outbreak: Wuhan, Hubei, China
- Index case: 19-01-2020
- Confirmed cases: 4,115,928 (as of 3 November 2023)
- Active cases: 1,637 (as of 3 November 2023)
- Hospitalised cases: 733 (as of 3 November 2023)
- Critical cases: 12 (as of 3 November 2023)
- Recovered: 4,106,444 (as of 3 November 2023)
- Deaths: 7,748 (Note: 2 deaths of Queensland residents in NSW are reported under NSW Health's figures, but are excluded from this total.) (as of 3 November 2023)
- Fatality rate: 0.19%

Government website
- www.health.nsw.gov.au/Infectious/covid-19/ www.health.nsw.gov.au/news/Pages/2021-nsw-health.aspx

The COVID-19 pandemic in New South Wales, Australia was part of the worldwide pandemic of the coronavirus disease 2019 (COVID-19) caused by severe acute respiratory syndrome coronavirus 2 (SARS-CoV-2). The first confirmed case in New South Wales was identified on 19 January 2020 in Sydney where three travellers returning from Wuhan, Hubei, China, tested positive for the virus.

As of 1 April 2022, there had been over 1,863,186 confirmed cases in NSW: 1,149,142 confirmed cases from PCR testing, and nearly 714,044 positive rapid antigen tests (RAT) since mid-January 2022. 17,509,209 vaccines have been administered.

== Government response ==
Premier Gladys Berejiklian formed a "war cabinet" to make decisions in relation to the pandemic. Members included herself, Treasurer Dominic Perrottet, Minister for Health and Medical Research Brad Hazzard and Minister for Police and Emergency Services David Elliott.

Berejiklian gave daily press conferences for much of 2021, in which she gave updates of COVID-19 statistics in the state and took questions. During strict lockdown, the press conferences became the topic of multiple memes and humour pieces. The daily press conferences ended on 13 September, with the premier stating "to expect the leader of the government indefinitely to do this every day means that I am not doing my job properly".

=== Restrictions ===
In March 2020, the Secretary of the New South Wales Department of Education, Mark Scott ordered that, effective immediately, New South Wales schools introduce social distancing measures to reduce the spread of coronavirus and New South Wales Minister for Health and Medical Research Brad Hazzard announced that he was using his powers, under Section 7 of the 'Public Health Act 2010', to immediately and indefinitely cancel all public events with more than 500 attendees. The order is enforceable by NSW Police and violations of the order can carry a prison term of six months, an $11,000 fine, or both. Jury trials were suspended to limit the spread of coronavirus. Corrective Services New South Wales implemented screening mechanisms, early flu vaccination programs and stricter hygiene requirements for staff, visitors and inmates to slow the spread of the virus.

=== Border closures ===
The Victoria/New South Wales state border was closed from 8 July 2020 to 23 November, and from 1 January 2021 to 12 February. For much of the time the borders were open during 2021, people returning to NSW from Victoria were required to quarantine.

=== Contact tracing ===
On 23 November, it became mandatory for many businesses to use electronic record systems to collect details of patrons for possible contact tracing. On 12 July 2021, the use of QR code check-ins in retail stores, hire vehicles and many other settings, became mandatory in the entirety of NSW.

=== Lockdowns and curfews ===
==== 2020 ====
On 18 March, The Minister for Health Brad Hazzard signed an Order under the emergency powers of the Public Health Act 2010 supporting measures announced by Prime Minister Scott Morrison which included:

- a ban on non-essential indoor gatherings of 100 or more people (incl. staff)
- a ban on outdoor gatherings of 500 or more people to continue in place
- people only consider travel when it is essential
- strict visitation rules for aged care facilities including a limit of two visitors a day and preferably no children under 16 years of age
- social distancing measures of 1.5 metres
- lifting work restrictions on 20,000 student nurses so they can be engaged to help respond to the pandemic.

Despite a ban on gatherings of more than 500 people, huge crowds flocked to the popular Bondi Beach and other beaches across Sydney on Friday 20 March. On 21 March, crowds built up yet again which led Waverley Council to temporarily close Bondi, and the other beaches of Bronte and Tamarama.

From 24 March, parents were encouraged to keep children home from school, although schools remained open.

On 30 March, NSW Parliament passed the "COVID-19 Restrictions on Gathering and Movement" law, which limited public gatherings to two people and directed, "that a person must not, without reasonable excuse, leave the person's place of residence." It listed 16 reasonable excuses and took effect from midnight on 31 March.

On 8 May the Federal Government released a three-stage plan to re-open Australia in a COVID-safe structure. From 15 May New South Wales allowed five people to visit homes and to travel any distance to do so, outdoor gatherings of up to ten people, and some outdoor facilities to open.

From 11 May, students returned to school one day a week with a plan for a phased return over several weeks. From 25 May, the phased return was replaced with full-time schooling.

From 1 July 2020, New South Wales eased restrictions further due to the limited community transmission of COVID-19, at that time. No set upper limit on patron numbers at indoor venues, but only one person per 4 square metres. Outdoor venues, with a maximum capacity of 40,000, were allowed up to 25 per cent of normal capacity. Events had to be ticketed, patrons seated and follow guidelines. Restriction on funerals eased, but the four-square-metre rule applied. Other existing restrictions, no more than 20 guests inside homes, 20 outside, remained in force. Restrictions were tightened again on 17 July.

==== 2021 ====
On 23 June 2021, from 4pm, some partial restrictions were introduced for Greater Sydney, the Blue Mountains, the Central Coast, Wollongong and Shellharbour limiting visitor numbers to homes, density in hospitality venues, participant numbers in dance and gym classes, and other activities, and requiring masks in indoor non-residential settings. Residents of the City of Sydney, Waverley, Randwick, Canada Bay, Inner West, Bayside, and Woollahra local government areas were restricted from travel outside metropolitan Sydney for non-essential reasons.

From 25 June at 11:59pm, stay-at-home orders were in force for anyone who lived or worked in the local government areas of Woollahra, Waverley, Randwick and City of Sydney, requiring that those people leave home only for necessary work or education, outdoor exercise, caretaking duties, or buying essential goods. On 26 June stay-at-home orders were expanded to all of Greater Sydney, the Blue Mountains, the Central Coast and Wollongong.

On 9 July, from 5pm, an additional set of restrictions was put in place for Greater Sydney:

- Outdoor public gatherings limited to two people (excluding members of the same household)
- People must stay in their Local Government Area or within 10 km of home for exercise and outdoor recreation, with no carpooling between non-household members
- Browsing in shops is prohibited, plus only one person per household, per day may leave the home for shopping
- Funerals limited to ten people in total (from Sunday, 11 July)

Greater Sydney region schools moved to a learn-from-home model for students from the beginning of Term 3, 12 July, with in-person schooling available for families that needed it. Schools outside Greater Sydney recommended masking, restricted visitors including parents, and additional restrictions on activities such as choirs.

On 13 August, restrictions on leaving Greater Sydney were tightened. Residents were required to obtain a permit to leave the region. Visiting holidays homes was only permitted under "special circumstances", and limited to one person.

On 14 August at 5pm, stay-at-home orders were issued throughout New South Wales, retail premises were closed unless in specific categories including supermarkets, pharmacies, and building supplies, and employers were required to allow work-from-home where "reasonably practicable", initially to extend to 22 August. The statewide stay-at-home orders were extended several times.

From 16 August people who had to isolate when awaiting COVID-19 test results could be paid $320 to compensate for lost wages.

On 23 August, as of midnight, some previously announced added restrictions came into force: a curfew from 9pm to 5am in the 12 'LGAs of concern' and mask wearing became mandatory outside the home everywhere in NSW.

On 27 August, a phased return-to-school plan was announced for later in the year, with school scheduled to begin 25 October for kindergarten and year 1, 1 November for years 2, 6, and 11, and 8 November for years 3–5 and 7–10.

On 9 September, the NSW state government announced that when full vaccination levels reached 70%, those who are fully vaccinated would have greater freedoms than others. This 70% level was predicted to happen in mid-October.

On 11 September at 12:01am, many areas of regional NSW came out of lockdown (stay-at-home orders lifted) as planned, after the last extension. Those areas were ones which had no cases of COVID for 14 days, and were also deemed low-risk. Even 'out' of lockdown many restrictions will remain in effect. Within a week Yass, Albury, Lismore, Hilltops and Glen Innes LGAs all had stay-at-home orders re-introduced, and by 21 September the Cowra, Kempsey, Byron and Tweed Shires' LGAs were also again under stay-at-home orders.
On 28 September the Port Macquarie and Muswellbrook Shire LGAs were both placed back into lockdown.

From 13 September, outdoor gatherings of up to five people including children, across multiple households, were allowed in most of Greater Sydney as long as all adults were vaccinated. Within the designated local government areas of concern, members of a single household were allowed to gather outdoors for one hour of recreation a day, in addition to one hour of exercise. 13 September was referred to as "picnic day".

From 21 September, those aged 18 and less living in areas of concern, and areas under stay-at-home rules, could create a 3-person 'friends bubble' to visit each other for play activities

On 11 October, which some news media dubbed "Freedom Day", the 107 day lockdown in NSW was eased, mostly for the fully vaccinated. Stay-at-home orders were removed for them; non-essential retailers, hairdressers, and hospitality venues were among those able to re-open to people who could prove their full-vaccinated status; masks were no longer mandatory in the open, though still required indoors in public places and on public transport. The same day, full COVID-19 vaccination reached 75.2%, and 90.8% had received one dose.

On 16 October NSW reached 80% full vaccination. Because of this, for those who were fully vaccinated, from 18 October mask wearing requirements, among others, and restrictions on numbers attending gatherings were eased, allowing more people to visit at home, gather outside, and at "controlled" (seated, fenced or ticketed) outdoor events. Travel between Greater Sydney and regional NSW was not yet permitted.

On 25 October, schools resumed face-to-face learning for all students, with the initial planned return finishing 8 November having been revised twice to have students return earlier.

On 1 November, travel between Greater Sydney and regional NSW was permitted. Fully vaccinated Australian citizens, residents, and their families became able to arrive from international destinations into New South Wales without hotel quarantine.

On 15 December, additional restrictions were dropped, including masks in hospitality and retail spaces, and density limits in gym and dance classes. Contact tracing venue check-ins were reduced to high risk venues. Masks were still required in airports, on planes, and on public transport.

=== Protests ===
Multiple lockdowns happened in New South Wales in 2021. Significant protests included:

- An anti-lockdown protest on 24 July in Sydney where several people were arrested. The Sydney CBD was shut down for hours as several thousand people marched from Camperdown, through Broadway to George Street. A police taskforce, 'Seasoned', was established to identify people at the unauthorised march, which breached public health orders. There were also protests that day in Brisbane and Melbourne.
- Anti-lockdown protest in Sydney city on the 21st August. The protest was countered by a pre-planned police response of over 1,500 officers and roadblocks on major roads into the central business district. About 250 protesters got into Sydney and over 45 people were arrested. One of its main organisers, a 29-year-old Victorian man, was arrested before the protest on 19 August in Hornsby for breaching public health orders by travelling to Sydney from Queensland. Protests were also held that day in Adelaide, Brisbane, Darwin, Melbourne and Perth.
- Numerous anti-lockdown protests across the state on 31 August. At least 79 protests occurred, including outside the NSW Parliament building and Byron Shire Council Chambers in Mullumbimby. Protests also took place in Blacktown, Fairfield, Sutherland and Liverpool in Sydney, and Ballina, Cessnock, Dubbo, Grafton, Lake Macquarie, Lismore, Mudgee, Nowra, Orange, Port Macquarie, Shellharbour and Wagga Wagga in regional NSW. 24 of the protests were in the state's north alone. Police arrested over 150 people and issued more than 500 infringement notices in connection with the events. Several police officers were injured.

== Vaccination rollout ==
On 21 February 2021, the first public COVID-19 vaccinations in Australia, with the Pfizer–BioNTech vaccine, were administered in Sydney. Up to 6:00 pm on 23 February in NSW, 3,200 people were immunised across three state-run hospitals.

On 10 May, a mass vaccination hub opened at Sydney Olympic Park. The same day, registrations began for NSW residents aged 40 to 49-years to receive the Pfizer COVID-19 vaccine. Pfizer was the preferred vaccine, with AstraZeneca initially restricted to only those over 60-years-of-age on the advice of the Australian Technical Advisory Group on Immunisation (ATAGI) due to blood-clot issues in younger people. Due to low numbers of Pfizer vaccines available, AstraZeneca was later made available to those aged 18–59 in outbreak areas if they provided written or verbal consent.

On 9 August, Qudos Bank Arena at Sydney Olympic Park opened as an additional vaccination hub, initially targeting Year 12 students to allow them to take Higher School Certificate (HSC) exams in person. Vaccine doses were reallocated from regional areas to facilitate vaccinating students. The Qudos Bank Arena vaccination hub closed on 7 November.

== Government economic support ==
On 17 March 2020, the New South Wales government announced a AU$2.3 billion stimulus package, including

- $700 million for health services.
- $450 million was allocated to waive payroll tax for 3 months
- $250 million so state-owned buildings and public schools could employ more cleaners
- $750 million was allocated for capital works and public asset maintenance.

Until 18 July 2020, international travellers who had to undergo compulsory quarantine on arrival did not have to pay for their accommodation, at a cost of A$65 million to the NSW Government. Under new rules starting on Saturday 18 July 2020, all new arrivals are being charged for their quarantine.

In November 2021, the state government announced $130 million of funding, including for psychology and psychiatry services, to assist those who had been adversely affected mentally by the COVID-19 pandemic. and in December they announced that they would source rapid antigen test (RAT) kits and distribute them for free.

=== Dine and Discover ===
On 17 November 2020 the NSW Government announced the "Dine and Discover" programme in the state budget. All NSW residents over 18 years-of-age were eligible to receive four A$25 vouchers through Service NSW to help stimulate the economy. Two vouchers are for dining, Monday to Thursday only, excluding public holidays. The other two are to be spent on entertainment, excluding on public holidays. Businesses need to be COVID-safe registered, and sign-up for the scheme. The vouchers cannot be used for gambling, alcohol, cigarettes, retail purchases or accommodation. The program was originally called "Out and About".

As early as mid-April 2021, the scheme was said by some regional NSW residents to be "city centric". At this time, the vouchers had been used by less than 10% of the 5 million who could use it. There were calls by NSW opposition political parties for the scheme to be extended beyond its initial 30 June 2021 deadline to use the vouchers. On 9 June 2021, the Dine & Discover scheme was extended by a month to 31 July, and on 29 June extended again to 31 August. Use for take-away food purchases was also allowed. The vouchers were eventually extended to 30 June 2022. In November 2021, two extra vouchers were granted, one for dining and one for entertainment. On 29 June, the Dine and Discover stimulus scheme was extended for the second time, to 31 August, and now also allowed take-away food purchases.

== Significant outbreaks ==
=== Northern Beaches outbreak ===
On 16 December 2020, health authorities announced that two residents of the Northern Beaches district of Sydney had tested positive to COVID, with the source of their infection not apparent. A stay at home advisory for the Northern Beaches area was issued on 17 December as 17 infections had been identified in the area.

On 19 December 2020, a public health order was issued, locking down Sydney's Northern Beaches. Residents of the Northern Beaches LGA were required to stay at home from 5 pm on Saturday 19 December, until 11:59 pm on Wednesday 23 December unless they had a lawful reason to travel, including for: essential shopping; essential travel for work and to or from a school or educational institution; exercise; medical care, carer's responsibilities or compassionate needs. Entry to the area was similarly restricted. Public gatherings were limited to two persons.

By 20 December, there were 68 cases. This prompted restrictions on admission of Sydney residents or visitors to Sydney, to other states. These ranged from 14-day quarantines (ACT, NT, Queensland, South Australia, Tasmania, Victoria) to no entry without an exemption (Queensland). South Australia barred entry to anyone from the Northern Beaches, while Western Australia barred everyone coming from NSW. Measures to stem the spread of COVID-19 in Sydney were again tightened. No more than 10 people were allowed in homes in Greater Sydney, Blue Mountains, Central Coast and Illawarra-Shoalhaven.

New Year's Eve celebrations were restricted in Sydney city, around the harbour and suburbs. The midnight fireworks on Sydney Harbour, normally 20 minutes, were cut back to 7 minutes, with no fireworks at 9 pm. The harbour foreshores were closed to prevent crowds congregating. Only residents, guests, and those with bookings at bars, hotels and restaurants, were allowed in foreshore areas under a pass system. Vantage points in North Sydney were also closed.

On Saturday, 2 January 2021, it was announced that as of midnight that day, facemasks would become mandatory in many enclosed places in Greater Sydney. All public transport, shops, supermarkets, cinemas, theatres and places of worship were included. Hospitality workers also had to wear masks. Children under 12 years-of-age were exempt. An A$200 on the spot fine could be charged for non-compliance. Fines were applied from 4 January (Monday).

=== Bondi cluster ===
On 16 June 2021, NSW Health announced a limousine driver who had worked transporting inbound passengers at Sydney Airport had tested positive for the Delta variant and had visited locations in Sydney including Westfield Bondi Junction.

By 30 June, the 'Bondi cluster' of delta variant COVID-19 reached 160 cases, becoming Sydney's largest cluster to this date, and by 7 July, the Bondi cluster linked cases had reached 264.

In late July, Australian Prime Minister Scott Morrison rejected an appeal from New South Wales for additional Pfizer Cominarty vaccine doses, with the outbreak in south-western Sydney described as a "national emergency" by New South Wales Premier Gladys Berejiklian. ATAGI issued updated guidance advising adults in the Greater Sydney region to strongly consider vaccination with the AstraZeneca vaccine.

On 15 August, with daily diagnoses above 400 cases, Berejiklian said that eliminating COVID infections in NSW was "near impossible", describing it a week later as "completely unrealistic". From early August onwards, the state pursued a plan to reduce COVID restrictions based on second-dose vaccination rates, rather than COVID case loads. On 5 October Dominic Perrottet replaced Berejiklian as premier of NSW and on 7 October Perrottet announced additional loosening of restrictions from 11 October onwards beyond the roadmaps set by Berejiklian. From 11 October, with double-dose vaccination rates above 70% of NSW adults, restrictions loosened despite ongoing case loads.

Hospital cases arising from the Bondi outbreak wave peaked at 1268 admissions on 21 September and had fallen to 711 patients by 14 October.

Bayside, Blacktown, Campbelltown, Canterbury-Bankstown, Cumberland, Fairfield Georges River, Liverpool, and Parramatta were called the "8 LGAs of concern"

=== Omicron ===
The Omicron variant was first detected in NSW on 28 November 2021 in travellers who had arrived the previous day from Southern Africa via Doha. Community transmission of the variant was detected on 3 December in a school student with no history of international travel. Within a week, hundreds of community transmission cases were associated with an event at the Argyle Nightclub in Newcastle on 8 December. In mid-December, restrictions on masks and gatherings continued to be eased by the government.

In January 2022 drops in consumer spending and confidence were reported consistent with self-imposed restrictions. By 22 January 2022, COVID hospitalizations appeared to have peaked, having passed 120 a day during the Omicron outbreak. Seroprevalence studies of blood donors suggested that approximately one fifth of New South Wales residents may have contracted COVID during the December/January Omicron wave.

== Statistics ==
Plot of COVID-19 cumulative cases in New South Wales

View source data.

Plot of COVID-19 daily cases in New South Wales

View source data.

Plot of COVID-19 cumulative deaths in NSW

View source data.

• 11 July 2021 in above graph was first death in Sydney's Delta outbreak
Note: Death plot data up to 19 March 2022

== Event cancellations ==
As a consequence of social distancing requirements, lockdowns, travel restrictions, and state or national border closures implemented when the COVID-19 pandemic occurred, numerous events in 2020 and 2021 were cancelled, rescheduled, postponed, reduced in size, or changed location. Some went to an online or streaming format. Some events, such as Vivid Sydney were cancelled for the second year in a row. Into early 2021 events such as regional agricultural shows, and music festivals (Byron Bay Bluesfest and Groovin the Moo) were cancelled. As of 16 January 2021 twenty regional town shows scheduled for January or February 2021 had been postponed or cancelled in New South Wales.

- In 2020, the Sydney Royal Easter Show, the largest ticketed event in Australia, was cancelled only for the third time in its 197-year history. The 2021 Easter show went ahead with restrictions such as limits on patron numbers.
- NSW local council elections due in September 2020 were postponed to September 2021. They were later postponed again to 4 December 2021 due to a wave of delta COVID-19 variant infections that caused numerous lockdowns in the state.
- Vivid Sydney was cancelled in 2020 for the first time in its history, then cancelled again in 2021.
- The 2020 Sydney Writers' Festival suspended ticket sales and are expected to cancel their seasons.
- The Festival of Dangerous Ideas 2020 was cancelled on 16 March.
- The 2020 Byron Bay Bluesfest was cancelled due to the introduction of 14-day self-isolation for anyone entering Australia. The 2021 Bluesfest scheduled for 1–5 April, was also cancelled, one day before it was to commence, by a public health order signed by the Minister for Health Brad Hazzard. A case of community transmission was found in Byron Bay after people linked to the Brisbane 'nurse cluster' visited venues in Byron Bay while unknowingly infectious.
- In 2020, Hunter Valley Steamfest was cancelled, and cancelled again in 2021.
- Splendour in the Grass 2020 was first postponed from July until 23–25 October 2020, then postponed again to 2021.
- The 2020 Sydney Film Festival was cancelled on 18 March 2020. The 2021 "67th Sydney Film Festival: Virtual Edition and Awards" were to be run "virtually" on 10–21 June 2021 via the festival website.
- On 17 March 2020, the Canowindra International Balloon Challenge, due to be held in April, was cancelled due to concerns about "the spread of coronavirus". The 2021 event was held as scheduled on 26 April to 1 May.
- On 8 September 2020, Tamworth Regional Council voted to cancel the 49th Tamworth Country Music Festival. The Country Music Awards of Australia (Golden Guitar Awards), an annual awards night held during the Festival, is planned to proceed via online streaming.
- On 19 December, the 2020 Sydney to Hobart Yacht Race was cancelled due to an outbreak in the Greater Sydney region. Crews, officials and supporters would have had to quarantine on arrival in Hobart.
- The 2020 City2Surf 50th-anniversary run was pushed back from 9 August until 18 October, and the live event was cancelled. The event was run as a virtual event where participants ran the length of the course on their local streets using an app. The same happened in 2021, when Sydney was in another lockdown.
- Under the Southern Stars music festival was cancelled in 2020, and in April 2021 that year's was postponed to 2022.
- An alternate 2021 National NAIDOC Awards event was planned for 3 July 2021 at the Sydney Opera House after the awards ceremony in Alice Springs (Mparntwe) was cancelled. After Sydney went into COVID lockdown on 23 June, the Sydney ceremony was postponed as rules for travellers returning to the Northern Territory meant that most people could not attend the Sydney event without a 14-day quarantine.
- On 9 September 2021, the 2021 NRL Grand Final, set for 3 October at Stadium Australia was moved interstate to Suncorp Stadium in Queensland due to "the current Covid-19 situation in Greater Sydney and across the state".
- The Numeralla Folk Festival was cancelled in 2020 due to the pandemic, and in mid-January 2021 the 2021 event was also cancelled after the state government again tightened restrictions, extending a ban on indoor live singing to outdoors.

== See also ==
- Timeline of the COVID-19 pandemic in Australia
- COVID-19 pandemic in Australia
- COVID-19 pandemic
