= I Care =

I Care may refer to:

- I Care (album), a 2006 album by Rachelle Ann Go
- "I Care" (Tom T. Hall song), 1974
- "I Care" (Beyoncé song), 2012

== See also ==
- Eye care
- İcarə, the former name of Eçara, a village in the Jalilabad Rayon of Azerbaijan
- Ikare, a city in the northern part of Ondo State, Nigeria
