= Monica Tudehope =

Australian state politician (born 1985)

Monica Tudehope MP

Member of the New South Wales Legislative Assembly for Epping
- Incumbent
- Assumed office 19 October 2024
- Preceded by: Dominic Perrottet

Personal details
- Born: 1985 (age 40–41)
- Party: Liberal
- Parent: Damien Tudehope (father)
- Education: University of Sydney
- Occupation: Politician
- Website: NSW Liberal profile

Monica Joan Tudehope is an Australian politician. In 2024, she was selected by the NSW Liberals to contest the 2024 Epping by-election, in which she was elected.

== Early life ==
Tudehope is the daughter of current member of the Legislative Council Damien Tudehope and was raised in West Pennant Hills. Tudehope attended Tangara School for Girls, in Cherrybrook and graduated from the University of Sydney.

== Career ==
Tudehope was Deputy Chief of Staff to Premier Dominic Perrottet, Tudehope previously unsuccessfully contested Liberal preselection for the casual Senate vacancy caused by Marise Payne's resignation.

In 2024, she was selected to contest the 2024 Epping by-election triggered by Perrottet's resignation as member for Epping. Tudehope won the preselection with 89 of the 115 votes.

== See also ==
- Damien Tudehope
- 2024 Epping State By-Election
