= Ləzran, Yardymli =

Ləzran
- Municipality
- Location within Azerbaijan
- Coordinates: 38°59′47″N 48°20′54″E
- Country: Azerbaijan
- Rayon: Yardymli

Population
  - Total: 137
- Time zone: UTC+4 (AZT)
  - Summer (DST): UTC+5 (AZT)

Ləzran (also, Lyazan) is a village and the least populous municipality in the Yardymli Rayon of Azerbaijan. It has a population of 137. The municipality consists of the villages of Ləzran and Eçara.
