= 2021 New South Wales Liberal Party leadership election =

2021 Liberal Party of Australia (New South Wales Division) leadership election
← 2019	5 October 2021	2023 →
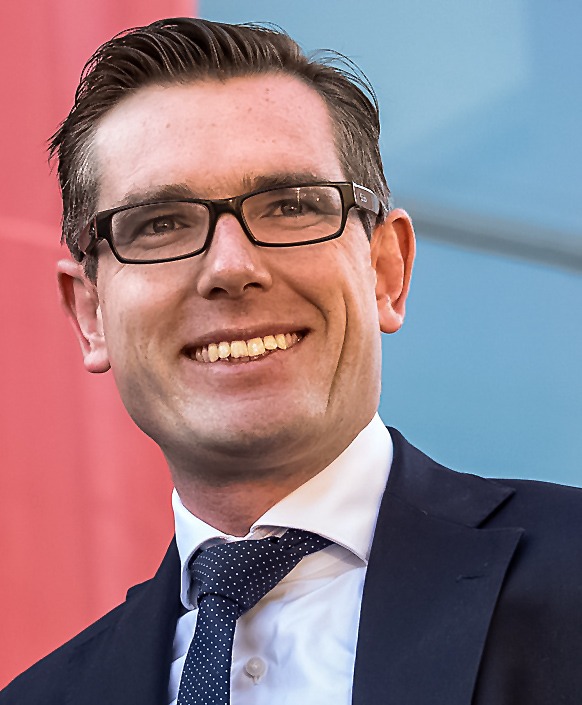

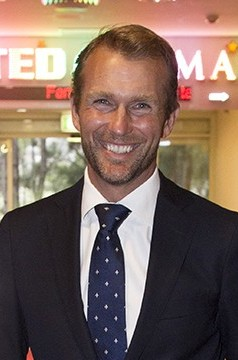
Candidate	Dominic Perrottet	Rob Stokes
Percentage	88.63%	11.37%
Caucus	39	5
Seat	Epping	Pittwater
Faction	Conservative (Note: Also known as "right" faction.)	Moderate
Leader before election
Gladys Berejiklian
Elected Leader
Dominic Perrottet

The 2021 Liberal Party of Australia (New South Wales Division) leadership election was a leadership vote held on 5 October 2021 to elect a new leader of the New South Wales Division of the Liberal Party of Australia and subsequently the Premier of New South Wales, following the resignation of Gladys Berejiklian. The election was conducted among the Liberal Party members of the Parliament of New South Wales and contested between Dominic Perrottet and Rob Stokes. Perrottet won the election 39 votes to 5. Stuart Ayres was elected unopposed as deputy party leader.

The leadership election was the first time Liberal Party parliamentary members had to vote for a leader in almost twenty years. The previous occurrence was in 2002, which was contested between incumbent Kerry Chikarovski and John Brogden.

A separate leadership election for the Liberal Party's coalition partner, the NSW Nationals, was held the following day.

== Background ==
Gladys Berejiklian announced her resignation as premier and the leader of the party on 1 October 2021 following the announcement by the Independent Commission Against Corruption (ICAC) would be investigating her role regarding grants in the Riverina region of New South Wales between 2012 and 2018. Part of the investigation is also looking into her previous relationship with former MP Daryl Maguire who had held the seat of Wagga Wagga from 1999 until his resignation in 2018. Appearing before the ICAC on 14 October 2020, Maguire admitted that he used his position as a member of parliament and as a Parliamentary Secretary to make money for himself and his associates. Berejiklian's resignation came at a time when the state was managing the prolonged effects of the COVID-19 pandemic.

Reports by various media sources on 3 October indicated that Dominic Perrottet, the current Treasurer of New South Wales had secured a factional deal to become Premier with Stuart Ayres as his deputy. However, Stokes confirmed that he would still contest the leadership election so that "factional heavyweights don't have a say" on 4 October.

== Candidates ==
=== Declared ===
- Dominic Perrottet, Treasurer and Deputy Leader of the Liberal Party in New South Wales
List of Dominic Perrottet endorsements

Federal members of parliament

- John Howard, Liberal Leader and Prime Minister of Australia (1996–2007)

Newspapers and Media Organisations

- Australian Financial Review
- Rob Stokes, Minister for Planning and Public Spaces

=== Declined ===
- Andrew Constance, Minister for Transport and Roads (seeking preselection as the Liberal Party candidate for the Division of Gilmore at the 2022 Australian federal election, preselected successful though Constance was not elected to Gilmore)
- Mark Speakman, Attorney-General, Minister for the Prevention of Domestic Violence, Leader of the House
- Stuart Ayres, Minister for Jobs, Investment, Tourism and Western Sydney (ran for Deputy Leader)
- Matt Kean, Minister for Energy and Environment

== See also ==
- Gladys Berejiklian
- 2023 New South Wales state election
- 2021 Australian Labor Party (New South Wales Branch) leadership election
