= WorkCover Authority of New South Wales =

Former New South Wales Government agency

Statutory authority overview
- Formed: 1989
- Dissolved: 2015
- Jurisdiction: New South Wales
- Parent Statutory authority: Department of Finance and Services
- Key documents: Safety, Return to Work and Support Board Act, 2012 (NSW); Work Health and Safety Act, 2011 (NSW)
- Website: workcover.nsw.gov.au

The WorkCover Authority of New South Wales (or WorkCover NSW) was a New South Wales Government agency established in 1989. The agency created regulations to promote productive, healthy and safe workplaces for workers and employers in New South Wales. The agency formed part of the Safety, Return to Work and Support Division established pursuant to the Safety, Return to Work and Support Board Act, 2012 (NSW).

On 1 September 2015, WorkCover NSW was replaced by three new entities – Insurance and Care NSW (icare), the State Insurance Regulatory Authority (SIRA), and SafeWork NSW, the new work health and safety regulator. The changes were part of reforms to improve the workers compensation system for employers and injured workers.

The information below pertains to the former WorkCover NSW, as WorkCover NSW no longer exists and its functions have been split between the aforementioned agencies.

The Authority enforces their role 1324 providing a list of rules that employers must follow in the form of a legal legislation. It is possible for them to enforce it by having the right to inspect workplaces to check that the legislation is being followed. It contains the requirements to keep a hazardous chemicals register, requirements to train, instruct and provide information to staff about handling the chemicals. Some of the things work cover ensures when it inspects work places is that all employees are properly trained, have the correct and appropriate personal protective equipment (PPE) and have the correct equipment to use.

== Powers and responsibilities ==
The WorkCover Authority of New South Wales primarily administers New South Wales workplace health and safety law, including the Work Health and Safety Act, 2011 (NSW) and the Workers Compensation Act, 1987 (NSW). WorkCover prepares codes of practice for particular industries, and investigates reports of unsafe practices in particular workplaces.

Through the investigation of complaints of occupational health and safety practices, WorkCover inspectors may forcibly enter places of work, take objects, and require information from people in charge of particular places of work. Once an investigation has concluded, WorkCover may require employers to improve their occupational health and safety practices, or refrain from authorizing certain work.

== Health and safety ==
WorkCover assesses all health and safety aspects of the workforce. This includes the environment by which an employee may raise a workplace safety issue and how to do so, the rights and responsibilities of everyone in the work place, including employers, employees and people visiting the workplace, the duty of care of people in the workforce, including planning for the prevention of accidents to people in the workplace, and what happens when these duties aren't met. WorkCover may also review bullying and psychosocial issues of employees and employers, and how to stop bullying, the appropriate knowledge and handling skills of different chemicals, how efficient and ergonomic the workplace is, ensuring appropriate usage of space. The Authority may also examine noise levels within the workforce, not exceeding the legal noise limit, and also the correct use and apt training for the use of machinery and equipment.

== Insurance and premiums ==
If a workplace injury or disease occurs, workers and employers are protected by the NSW workers compensation scheme. The scheme is in place to help maintain a financially viable workers compensation system that is fair and affordable for employers and improves outcomes for injured workers. The scheme is in place to give workers injured in the workplace medical and financial support. It is funded by premiums that are paid by the employers. The amount of premium that is paid by the employer depends on a few factors including the industry or sector operated; the amount of wages paid to your workers, the costs of any claims made by your injured workers and the dust diseases levy. If an injury does occur in the workplace, the employer will be covered for the cost of compensation to the worker that is injured, provided the employer has a 'workers compensation insurance policy'. Due to the workers compensation system, any injured worker may be able to get compensation in the form of weekly payments; lump sum payments for permanent impairment (and pain and suffering where applicable); and payment of medical and hospital expenses and rehabilitation assistance.

== Injuries and claims ==
WorkCover is responsible for providing protection to workers and employers in the form of a compensation system for work sustained injuries, which can provide weekly payments, lump sums for permanent impairment (and pain and suffering where applicable), payment of medical bills, provision of legal assistance to pursue a claim, and/or intensive rehabilitation assistance.

Workplace injuries are managed to ensure that the worker recovers and is able to return to work. This includes treatment and rehabilitation, retraining of the worker and the management of any compensation claims. The idea is that through the management of the injury, the worker may be able to return to work as soon as possible, and that all parts of an employer's policies for the return to work program are followed. A return to work coordinator should be nominated by an employer to help injured workers to return in a safe manner. The return to work coordinator can either be an employee nominated by the employer, or a person contracted specifically for this purpose. As part of the return to work program, an employer shall provide suitable duties for the worker during their recovery period, so that they are still able to continue working and do not have to take time off work completely. These duties should be short term, with a goal of assisting the recovery process, and shall comply with the worker's medical certificate, and finally shall be agreed upon by the employer, the worker, and their doctor.

WorkCover also runs various programs to help injured workers in returning to work. These include short periods of work experience called work trials to assist them in developing or redeveloping skills, and to build up physical and psychological fitness; formal retraining of skills at TAFE or university if the worker is unable to find suitable work after injury; funding to help with purchasing equipment to modify the work environment to the injured worker's needs; and the JobCover placement program (JPP), which provides a financial incentive to another employer to employ the injured worker In the case of a worker being injured, the employer, worker and insurer all have certain responsibilities to ensure that they are compensated, and given assistance so they can make a full recovery and return to work.

=== Injuries ===
It is the responsibility of an injured worker to immediately report it to their employer, and the details of the incident must be added to the register of injuries – a list containing all current injuries suffered by workers, caused in the workplace. If the injury is deemed serious enough, a claim can be made to the insurer. This can be made by anyone; however it must be done within 48 hours of the injury being notified. The insurer will then give the person who notified them a notification number, which can be used to track their notification. The claimant shall provide the insurer with details about the following:

1. worker's information – their name, residential address, contact details and date of birth
2. employer's information – the business name, current business address and employer contact
3. treating Doctor information – the name of the doctor or hospital where the injured worker is being treated
4. injury or illness details – the date of the injury, description of how it happened and a description of the injury itself
5. notifier information – the name of person making the notification, relationship to injured worker and contact details
6. supporting information – anything else the notifier considers necessary.

Payments will be made to the injured worker on a weekly basis, the amount dependent on the severity of the injury. In cases where the worker is injured permanently, they may be entitled to one or two lump sum payments. The employer shall send the claim to the insurer within seven days of receiving it, and the insurer may ask the employer questions about the claim, and ask for extra documentation which must be provided before the claim can go through. A complying agreement must then be made in writing between the insurer and the injured worker.

If the employer has not notified a workplace injury to the insurer or will not provide the employee with their workers compensation insurance policy number, the WorkCover Assistance Service on 13 10 50 assists with guiding claimants.

== Licensing ==
Before people and businesses undertake high risk activities in the workplace, they may be required to:

- obtain a permit
- notify WorkCover
- register certain equipment
- hold a licence or certificate of competency

WorkCover's Licensing Solutions Unit administer, advise, assess and approve applications for licences, permits, registrations and notifications. To be able to use explosives or fireworks, a license must be received from WorkCover. They are in charge of the regulation of explosive chemicals, in terms of unsupervised handling, use, manufacture, storage, import, supply and transport.[5] It is illegal to be in possession of explosive and dangerous chemicals without the appropriate WorkCover licence. Licences for explosives will only be given for commercial manufacturing, mining and quarrying, and anyone applying for these licenses must have extensive background checks from police and security agencies. For fireworks, either a pyrotechnicians license, or a fireworks (single use) license is required. A pyrotechnicians license allows you to use fireworks and teach people with a fireworks (single use) license in the correct handling of fireworks. A licensed pyrotechnician must also notify WorkCover seven working days before any fireworks are used, and complete the Fireworks display: Notification of pyrotechnics/fireworks display form.

As well as explosives and fireworks, licenses must be issued for things such as asbestos removal, demolition work, and other high risk work activities. As well as gaining the respective license, WorkCover must be notified if someone is undertaking any of the following activities:

- asbestos removal
- demolition work
- fireworks displays
- importation or export of explosives or security sensitive dangerous substances
- lead risk work
- operating a Major Hazard Facility (MHF) under the Work Health and Safety Regulation 2011
- storage of dangerous goods
- using carcinogenic substances at a place of work

== Medical and health care ==
=== Allied health providers ===
Allied health providers contribute significantly to improved health and also return to work outcomes for injured workers. All allied health providers have to abide by administrative procedures proposed by WorkCover. Chiropractors, exercise physiologists, hearing service providers, independent consultants, osteopaths, physiotherapists, psychologists and counsellors, and remedial massage therapists are all subject to these requirements.

== Law and policy ==
WorkCover is responsible for the administration and enforcement of compliance with occupational health and safety, management of workplace injury and workers compensation legislation it also manages the workers compensation system.

=== Acts ===
Acts are legislation created by parliament. WorkCover administers several acts as its main statutory function. These include:

- Explosives Act, 2003 (NSW)
- Occupational Health and Safety Act, 2000 (NSW)
- Rural Workers Accommodation Act, 1969 (NSW)
- Sporting Injuries Insurance Act, 1978 (NSW)
- Workers Compensation Act, 1987 (NSW)
- Workplace Injury Management and Workers Compensation Act, 1998 (NSW)
- Workers Compensation (Bush Fire, Emergency and Rescue Services) Act, 1987 (NSW)
- Workers' Compensation (Dust Diseases) Act, 1942 (NSW)

=== Codes of Practice ===
WorkCover uses industry codes of practice in order to achieve industry standards. Under the Occupational Health and Safety Act, 2000, codes of practice may be made under approval of the Minister for Finance and Services. Whilst not legislation, the codes of practice should be observed. Employers, workers, designers, manufacturers and suppliers should follow the codes of practice in accordance with the legislation and associated regulations. A person cannot be prosecuted for not observing codes of practices. If there is an offence under the Act, the breach of the codes of conduct can be used as evidence.

=== Fraud ===
WorkCover helps to minimize the impact of fraud by a company's employers, workers and/or service providers. WorkCover may assist with investigations into suspected fraudulent activities. Fraudulent acts by employers may include failing to pass on workers compensation benefits to workers and/or supplying false or misleading information to obtain a policy. Fraudulent acts by workers may include their claiming their injury occurred at work when it actually happened playing sport or during another activity undergone in the worker's own time. Fraudulent acts by service providers may include submitting fraudulent invoices or providing false information to the service recipients.

=== Regulations ===
A regulation is law and, as such, employers, workers, insurers, designers, manufacturers, suppliers and others must meet their obligations under both the legislation and the regulations. WorkCover administer several regulations:

- Dangerous Goods (Gas Installations) Regulation 1998 (NSW)
- Dangerous Goods (Road and Rail Transport) Regulation 2009 (NSW)
- Explosives Regulation 2005 (NSW)
- Occupational Health and Safety Regulation 2001 (NSW)
- Sporting Injuries Insurance Regulation 2009 (NSW)
- Workers Compensation (Bush Fire, Emergency and Rescue Services) Regulation 2007 (NSW)
- Workers' Compensation (Dust Diseases) Regulation 2008 (NSW)
- Workers Compensation Regulation 2010 (NSW)

=== Standards ===
Australian standards outline safety requirements and give guidance to people working in certain areas or people that use certain equipment. When incorporated into legislation these standards become legally binding. Under NSW law, a variety of systems, equipment, products and materials must meet Australian Standards. The establishment of standards ensures that particular requirements are met. The requirements that are outlined are quality, performance, construction design, endurance time specificity, systems or processes and certain hazards and controls.

== Controversy ==
In December 2005, the Independent Commission Against Corruption found that 23 WorkCover employees had issued false certificates of competency, which ICAC states significantly undermined workplace safety on building sites. ICAC further states that systemic corruption risks were exposed by the incident:

[The ICAC] identified a number of deficiencies such as sharing of logon details and passwords, lack of supervision and controls in approving and printing certificates of competency, and lack of reconciliation between certificates issued and applicant fees.

In 2002, a New South Wales parliamentary committee criticized the WorkCover Authority.

== 2012 legislation ==
In 2012 a new Act, Regulations and Codes of Practice was enacted. The revised legislative instruments aimed at providing rights for health and safety to everyone in the workplace as well as providing them the opportunity to give their opinion of their workplaces' health and safety practices without having to worry about speaking out about an issue. The legislation includes changes to the laws involving PCBU's reasonably, control of hazardous work, plant and structure requirements, construction restrictions, labelling and classification of hazardous chemicals and a few changes to those regarding mines.
