= 2024 Epping state by-election =

- 19 October 2024

Electoral district of Epping in the New South Wales Legislative Assembly
- Registered: 59,908
- Turnout: 77.01% (▼13.69)

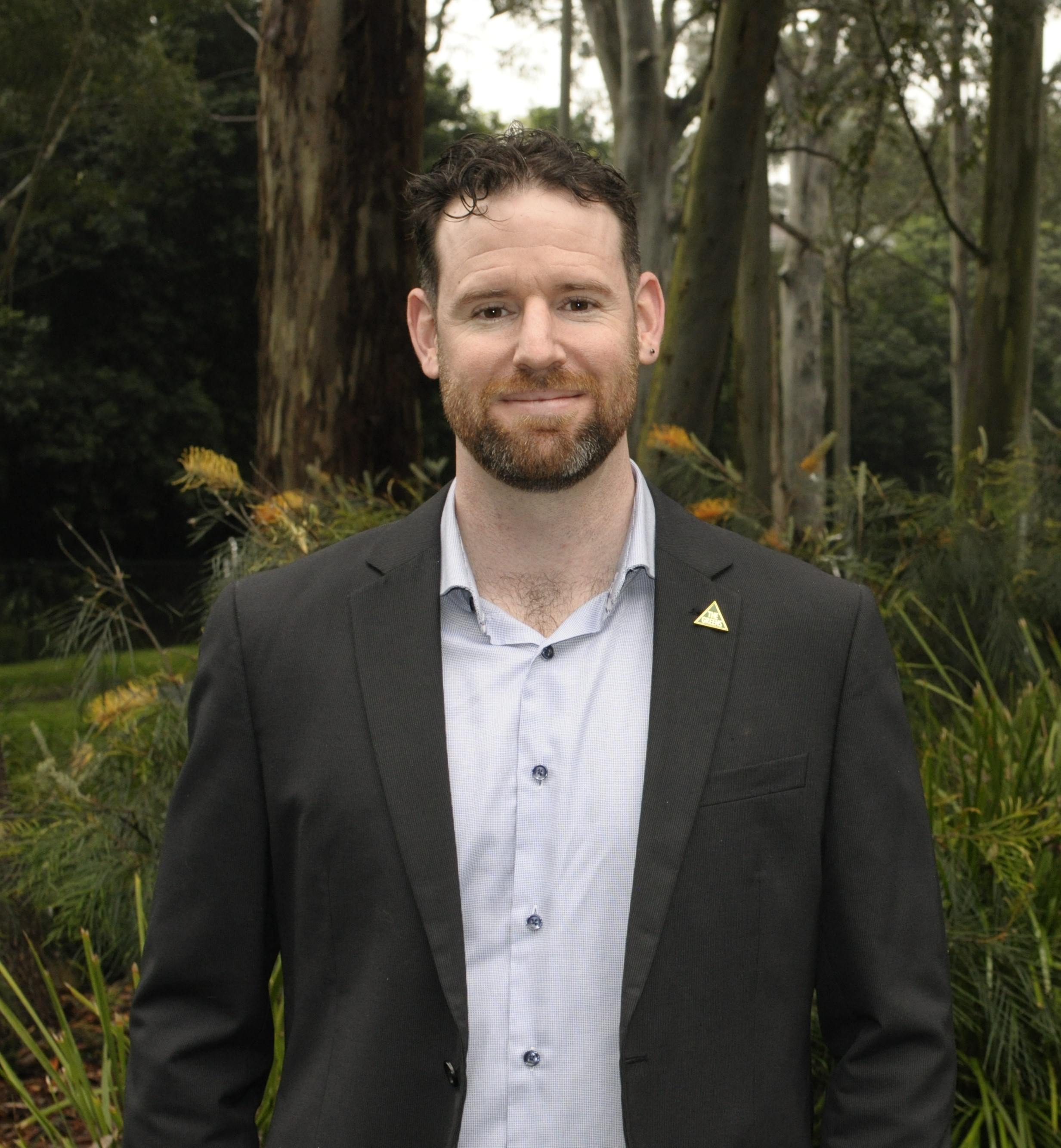
	First party	Second party	Third party
			IND
Candidate	Monica Tudehope	Duncan Voyage	Edgar Lu
Party	Liberal	Greens	Independent
Popular vote	25,439	10,851	4,602
Percentage	57.08%	24.35%	10.33%
Swing	▲8.14	▲13.79	▲10.33
TCP	69.22%	30.78%
TCP swing	▲14.46	▲30.78
MP before election
Dominic Perrottet
Liberal
Elected MP
Monica Tudehope
Liberal

A by-election for the New South Wales Legislative Assembly seat of Epping was held on 19 October 2024, following the resignation of Liberal Party MP and former premier Dominic Perrottet.

== Background ==
The previous member for this seat, Dominic Perrottet, was premier from 2021 to 2023 when the Liberal Party in New South Wales lost government. During his tenure as member for Epping Perrottet was also treasurer from 2017 until 2021. Before Perrottet was member for Epping, he was member for the electorate of Hawkesbury from 2015 until 2019, and member for the electorate of Castle Hill from 2011 until 2015.

== Key dates ==
- Issue of writ – 27 September 2024
- Close of roll – 27 September 2024
- Close of nominations – 3 October 2024
- Candidates announced – 4 October 2024
- Early voting commences – 12 October 2024
- Postal vote applications close – 14 October 2024
- Polling day – 19 October 2024
- Last day for return of the writ – 8 November 2024

=== Previous results ===
2023 New South Wales state election: Epping
Party	Candidate	Votes	%	±%
Liberal	Dominic Perrottet	25,439	48.9	−5.4
Labor	Alan Mascarenhas	17,599	33.9	+5.4
Greens	Phil Bradley	5,489	10.6	+0.7
Independent	Victor Waterson	1,322	2.5	+2.5
Animal Justice	Carmen Terceiro	1,091	2.1	+2.1
Sustainable Australia	Bradley Molloy	1,045	2.0	+2.0
Total formal votes		51,985	97.6	+0.2
Informal votes		1,279	2.4	−0.2
Turnout		53,264	90.7	−1.3
Two-party-preferred result
Liberal	Dominic Perrottet	26,648	54.8	−6.5
Labor	Alan Mascarenhas	22,013	45.2	+6.5
Liberal hold		Swing	−6.5	

== Candidates ==
Candidates are listed in the order they appear on the ballot.

Party	Candidate	Background
Liberal	Monica Tudehope	Former deputy chief-of-staff for former premier Dominic Perrottet
Independent	Edgar Lu	
Greens	Duncan Voyage	Formerly worked in the Department of Defence and recently Médecins Sans Frontières.
Independent	Dezhong (Jerry) Wang	
Libertarian	Robert Cribb	

=== Liberal ===
On 17 August 2024 the Liberal Party preselected Monica Tudehope.

==== Preselection results ====
Party	Candidate	Votes	%	±%
Liberal	Monica Tudehope	89	77.39	
Liberal	Sreeni Pillamarri			
Liberal	Felicity Findlay			
Total formal votes		115	100.00	

=== Greens ===
On 24 August 2024, the Greens preselected Duncan Voyage.

=== Labor ===
The governing Labor Party stated they would not contest the by-election, with Premier Chris Minns stating "a swing against us would be a massive distraction".

== Results ==
2024 Epping by-election
Party	Candidate	Votes	%	±%
Liberal	Monica Tudehope	25,439	57.08	+8.14
Greens	Duncan Voyage	10,851	24.35	+13.79
Independent	Edgar Lu	4,602	10.33	+10.33
Independent	Dezhong (Jerry) Wang	2,435	5.46	+5.46
Libertarian	Rob Cribb	1,240	2.78	+2.78
Total formal votes		44,567	96.60	−1.00
Informal votes		1,569	3.40	+1.00
Turnout		46,136	77.01	−13.69
Two-candidate-preferred result
Liberal	Monica Tudehope	27,010	69.22	+14.46
Greens	Duncan Voyage	12,011	30.78	+30.78
Liberal hold				

== See also ==
- Electoral results for the district of Epping
- List of New South Wales state by-elections
- 2024 Hornsby state by-election (same day election)
- 2024 Pittwater state by-election (same day election)
