= Alice Chisholm =

Australian humanitarian (1856–1954)

Dame Alice Chisholm DBE
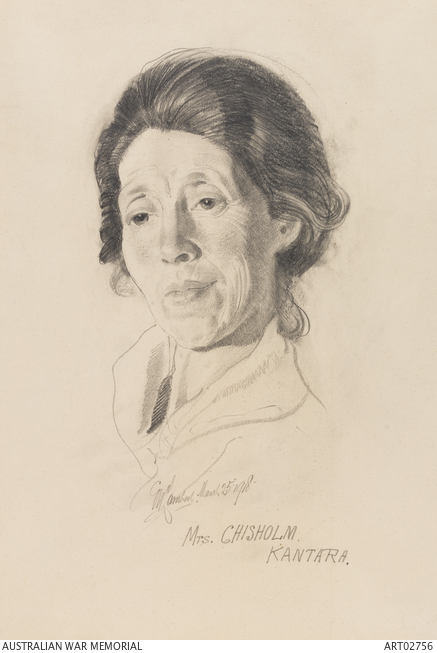
- Chisholm at Kantara, Egypt drawn by George Lambert on 25 March 1918
- Born: Alice Isabel Morphy; 3 July 1856; Reevesdale, near Goulburn, New South Wales, Australia
- Died: 30 May 1954 (aged 97); West Pennant Hills, Sydney, Australia
- Occupation: Canteen owner
- Spouse: William Alexander Chisholm (died 1902)
- Children: 5

Dame Alice Isabel Chisholm DBE (née Morphy; 3 July 1856 – 30 May 1954), known familiarly as "Mother Chisholm", was an Australian woman who provided canteen services for soldiers in Egypt and Palestine during World War I.

== Early life ==
She was born at Reevesdale near Goulburn, New South Wales to Major Richard John Morphy, pastoralist of Grena Mummell, Goulburn, and his wife Mary Emma (née Styles). She was raised by her maternal grandparents, after her mother died of measles, because her father was away serving in the Indian Army. She was educated at home. In 1877, she married pastoralist William Alexander Chisholm, a widower (died 1902); the couple had five children (three sons and two daughters); two of whom predeceased their mother.

== First World War ==
During the First World War her son Bertram was wounded at Gallipoli. She travelled to Egypt to be closer to him; when she arrived she noticed the lack of facilities for the troops and established a canteen in the Cairo suburb of Heliopolis largely at her own expense.

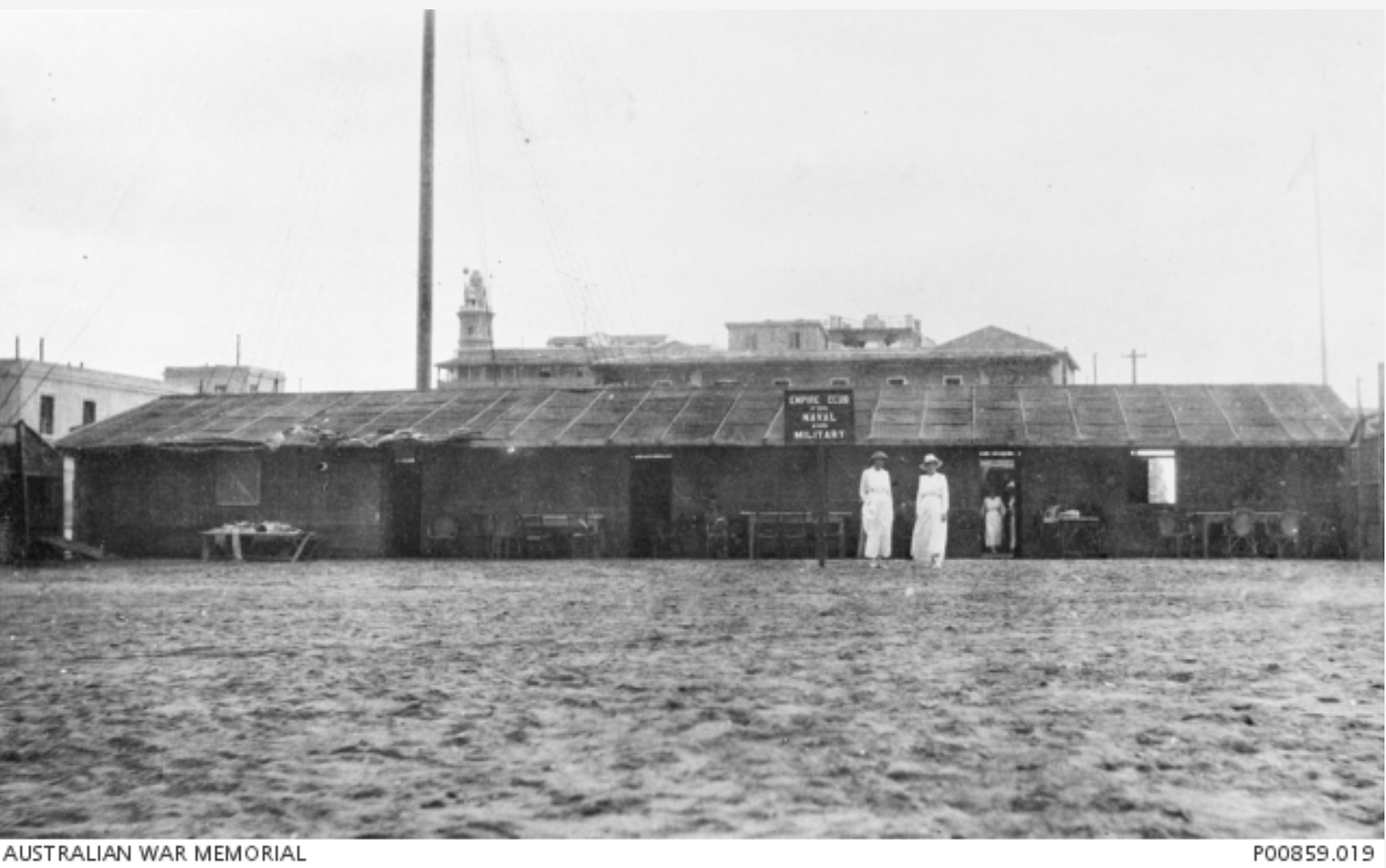
Alice Chisholm (left) and daughter outside Kantara Canteen for Naval and Military in Egypt, c.1916

She opened a second canteen in Egypt at Port Said, and a third in Kantara for troops fighting near the Suez Canal with two other Australasian women. The Kantara canteen expanded to include dormitories and dining rooms and eventually had the capacity to handle thousands of men. Profits from the canteens were used to provide the troops with comforts for their journey home.

== Post-war ==
She was appointed Commander of the Order of the British Empire (CBE) in 1918 and Dame Commander of the Order of the British Empire (DBE) in the 1920 civilian war honours. When she returned to Australia she continued working within the community. She helped found the Returned and Services League of Australia in Goulburn and she was active in the Country Women's Association and RSPCA.

== Death ==
Survived by two sons and a daughter, she died at her home in West Pennant Hills on 30 May 1954, aged 97 years and 11 months, and was buried in the Church of England cemetery at Kippilaw, near Goulburn. She was Australia's oldest-living dame, a record that was not broken until Dame Elisabeth Murdoch surpassed her age in January 2007.

== Legacy ==
A street in the Canberra suburb of Cook is named in her honour. Upon her return to Australia she lived in a house called "Bolderwood" in the Sydney North West suburb of Pennant Hills. The house still stands today.
