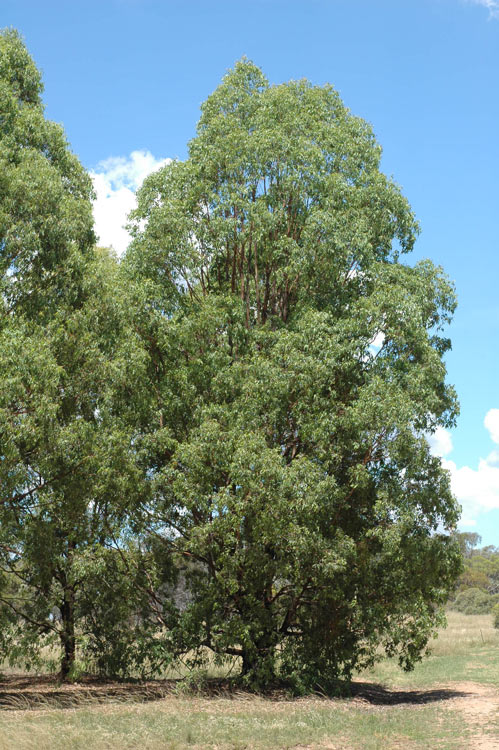
- Eucalyptus rummeryi in Burrendong Arboretum

Scientific classification
- Kingdom: Plantae
- Clade: Tracheophytes
- Clade: Angiosperms
- Clade: Eudicots
- Clade: Rosids
- Order: Myrtales
- Family: Myrtaceae
- Genus: Eucalyptus
- Species: E. rummeryi

Binomial name
- Eucalyptus rummeryi Maiden

= Eucalyptus rummeryi =

Steel box

Species of eucalyptus

Eucalyptus rummeryi, commonly known as steel box, Rummery's box or brown box, is a species of medium-sized to tall tree that is endemic to northern New South Wales. It has rough bark on the trunk and branches, lance-shaped to curved adult leaves, flower buds in groups of three or seven on the ends of branchlets, white flowers and conical, hemispherical or cup-shaped fruit.

== Description ==
Eucalyptus rummeryi is a tree that typically grows to a height of 40 m (130 ft) and forms a lignotuber. It has rough, fibrous or flaky, grey to black bark on the trunk and branches. Young plants and coppice regrowth have stems that are square in cross-section and leaves that are dull green, paler on the lower side, egg-shaped to lance-shaped, 55–110 mm (2.2–4.3 in) long and 15–35 mm (0.59–1.38 in) wide and petiolate. Adult leaves are glossy green, paler on the lower surface, lance-shaped to curved, 80–170 mm (3.1–6.7 in) long and 10–30 mm (0.39–1.18 in) wide tapering to a petiole 8–22 mm (0.31–0.87 in) long. The flower buds are arranged on the ends of branchlets in groups of three or seven on a branched peduncle 5–10 mm (0.20–0.39 in) long the individual buds on pedicels 2–4 mm (0.079–0.157 in) long. Mature buds are oval to spindle-shaped, 4–6 mm (0.16–0.24 in) long and 2–3 mm (0.079–0.118 in) wide with a conical operculum. Flowering occurs from November to December and the flowers are white. The fruit is a woody conical, hemispherical or cup-shaped capsule 3–5 mm (0.12–0.20 in) long and wide with the valves near rim level.

== Taxonomy and naming ==
Eucalyptus rummeryi was first formally described in 1923 by Joseph Maiden in his book A Critical Revision of the Genus Eucalyptus from material collected from Busby's Flat, near Casino by Edward George Rummery (1877–1958), (named as George Edward Rummery by Maiden) in 1921. The specific epithet (rummeryi) honours the collector of the type.

== Distribution and habitat ==
Steel box grows on slopes and ridges in wet or grassy forest from Dorrigo to north-west of Casino.
