= Electoral district of Epping =

Electorate in New South Wales

Epping New South Wales—Legislative Assembly
- Interactive map of district boundaries from the 2023 state election
- State: New South Wales
- Dates current: 1999–present
- MP: Monica Tudehope
- Party: Liberal
- Namesake: Epping
- Electors: 59,908 (2024)
- Area: 31.68 km^{2} (12.2 sq mi)
- Demographic: Inner-metropolitan
Electorates around Epping:
Castle Hill	Hornsby	Wahroonga
Winston Hills	Epping	Ryde
Parramatta	Parramatta	Ryde

Epping is an electoral district of the Legislative Assembly in the Australian state of New South Wales. The seat has been represented by Liberal MP Monica Tudehope since the 2024 Epping state by-election.

== History ==
The seat was created in 1999, largely replacing Eastwood. It was a safe Liberal seat until the 2023 state election where it became marginal.

== Geography ==
On its current boundaries, Epping includes the suburbs of Beecroft, Cheltenham, Dundas Valley, Epping, North Epping, Oatlands, Telopea, and parts of Carlingford, Dundas, North Parramatta, Pennant Hills and West Pennant Hills.

== Members for Epping ==
Member	Party	Period	Notes
Andrew Tink	Liberal	1999–2007	
Greg Smith	Liberal	2007–2015	
Damien Tudehope	Liberal	2015–2019	
Dominic Perrottet	Liberal	2019–2024	Premier of New South Wales from 5 October 2021 until 28 March 2023
Monica Tudehope	Liberal	2024–present	Elected at the 2024 Epping state by-election

== Election results ==
2024 Epping by-election
Party	Candidate	Votes	%	±%
Liberal	Monica Tudehope	25,439	57.08	+8.14
Greens	Duncan Voyage	10,851	24.35	+13.79
Independent	Edgar Lu	4,602	10.33	+10.33
Independent	Dezhong (Jerry) Wang	2,435	5.46	+5.46
Libertarian	Rob Cribb	1,240	2.78	+2.78
Total formal votes		44,567	96.60	−1.00
Informal votes		1,569	3.40	+1.00
Turnout		46,136	77.01	−13.69
Two-candidate-preferred result
Liberal	Monica Tudehope	27,010	69.22	+14.46
Greens	Duncan Voyage	12,011	30.78	+30.78
Liberal hold				
