= Perrottet ministry =

Perrottet ministry may refer to:

- First Perrottet ministry, the 98th Cabinet of New South Wales
- Second Perrottet ministry, the 99th Cabinet of New South Wales
