= Greg Smith (New South Wales politician) =

Australian politician

The Honourable Greg Smith SC

Attorney General of New South Wales
- In office 3 April 2011 – 23 April 2014
- Premier: Barry O'Farrell; Mike Baird
- Preceded by: John Hatzistergos
- Succeeded by: Brad Hazzard

Minister for Justice
- In office 3 April 2011 – 23 April 2014
- Premier: Barry O'Farrell; Mike Baird
- Preceded by: John Hatzistergos (Justice); Barbara Perry (Juvenile Justice)
- Succeeded by: Brad Hazzard

Member of the New South Wales Parliament for Epping
- In office 24 March 2007 – 6 March 2015
- Preceded by: Andrew Tink
- Succeeded by: Damien Tudehope

Personal details
- Born: 26 November 1947 (age 78)
- Party: Liberal Party
- Children: 5, including Nathaniel
- Education: University of Sydney
- Profession: Politician and Barrister

Gregory Eugene Smith SC (born 26 November 1947), is a former Australian politician, he was a member of the New South Wales Legislative Assembly representing Epping for the Liberal Party from 2007 to 2015. Smith served as the Attorney General of New South Wales and as the Minister for Justice in the O'Farrell government between 2011 and 2014.

== Early career and background ==
Born to parents Ted and Noreen, Smith grew up in the Sydney suburbs of Strathfield, Beverley Hills, Coogee, and Maroubra and the regional town of Goulburn. He was educated at St Joseph's Primary School, Goulburn and at Marcellin College, Randwick and graduated from the University of Sydney Law School with a Bachelor of Laws.

In 1987, Smith became a public prosecutor, and he eventually became Deputy Director of Public Prosecutions. He was appointed as a Senior Counsel before the Supreme Court of New South Wales.

Smith, a Roman Catholic, was the president of pro–life right to life organisation called Right to Life prior to entering politics.

== Political career ==
In 2006, Smith gained Liberal Party endorsement against Pru Goward for the seat of Epping to replace retiring Liberal member, Andrew Tink. Smith was elected as the Member for Epping at the 2007 state election.

Smith voiced his opposition to a relationships register, passed by the NSW Parliament in May 2010. The register gave recognition to unmarried couples, opposite- and same-sex couples. Smith said: "The passing of this bill will be another increment in the undermining and destruction of marriage and the traditional family." Former NSW Attorney-General John Hatzistergos, of the Labor Party, speculated that Smith had previously objected to putting same-sex couples on the same level as heterosexual couples.

Following the 2011 state election, Smith was appointed Attorney General and Minister for Justice in the O'Farrell–Stoner coalition government.

After the resignation of Barry O'Farrell as Premier, and the subsequent ministerial reshuffle in April 2014 by Mike Baird, Smith was dropped from the ministry. In July that year, Smith announced his retirement from politics and that he would not seek Liberal endorsement as a candidate for Epping at the 2015 election.

== Personal life ==
Smith has been married for over 35 years and is the father of five children. One son, Nathaniel, also serves in the New South Wales Parliament as Member for Wollondilly. Consistent with his Roman Catholic faith, he is a former president of the New South Wales Right to Life Association and the St Thomas More Society.

Smith is a keen cricket and Rugby League fan and has supported Western Suburbs Magpies (now the Wests Tigers) and the Eastwood Rugby Union Club. Smith is also a lead singer of a band called The Tokens and he has also stated that he would have followed singing career had he not been a lawyer.

Legal offices
Preceded by Martin Blackmore	Deputy Director of Public Prosecutions; 2002–2006	Succeeded by David Frearson
New South Wales Legislative Assembly
Preceded by Andrew Tink	Member for Epping; 2007–2015	Succeeded by Damien Tudehope
Political offices
Preceded by John Hatzistergos	Attorney General of New South Wales; 2011–2014	Succeeded by Brad Hazzard
Preceded by Phil Costa as Minister for Corrective Services	Minister for Justice; 2011–2014	Succeeded by Brad Hazzard
Preceded by Barbara Perry as Minister for Juvenile Justice	Minister for Justice; 2011–2014	Succeeded by Brad Hazzard
