= Dominic Perrottet =

Premier of New South Wales from 2021 to 2023

The Honourable Dominic Perrottet
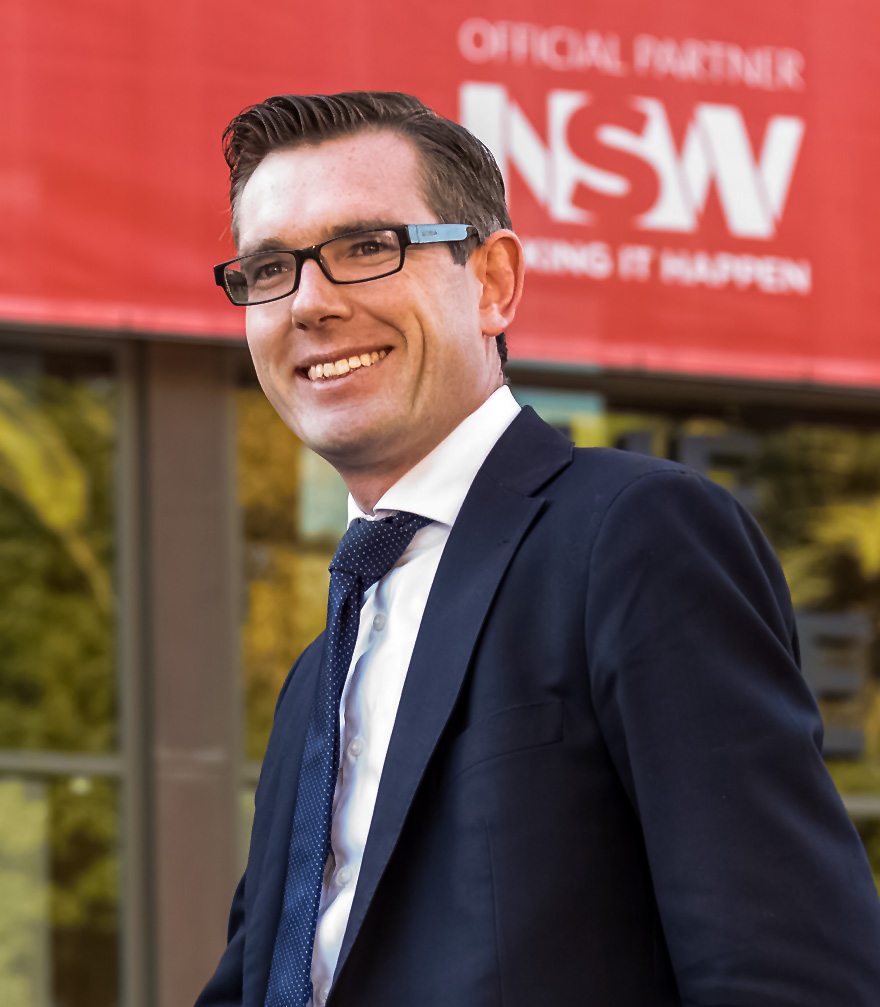
- Perrottet in 2016

46th Premier of New South Wales
- In office 5 October 2021 – 28 March 2023
- Monarchs: Elizabeth II; Charles III
- Governor: Margaret Beazley
- Deputy: John Barilaro; Paul Toole
- Preceded by: Gladys Berejiklian
- Succeeded by: Chris Minns

Leader of the Liberal Party in New South Wales
- In office 5 October 2021 – 25 March 2023
- Deputy: Stuart Ayres; Matt Kean
- Preceded by: Gladys Berejiklian
- Succeeded by: Mark Speakman

Deputy Leader of the Liberal Party in New South Wales
- In office 23 January 2017 – 5 October 2021
- Leader: Gladys Berejiklian
- Preceded by: Gladys Berejiklian
- Succeeded by: Stuart Ayres
Cabinet positions
65th Treasurer of New South Wales
In office 30 January 2017 – 5 October 2021
Premier	Gladys Berejiklian
Preceded by	Gladys Berejiklian
Succeeded by	Matt Kean
Minister for Industrial Relations
In office 30 January 2017 – 2 April 2019
Premier	Gladys Berejiklian
Preceded by	Gladys Berejiklian
Succeeded by	Don Harwin (as Minister for the Public Service and Employee Relations, Aboriginal Affairs, and the Arts)
Minister for Finance, Services and Property (Note: When appointed to the cabinet position, the portfolio was called: "Minister for Finance and Services".)
In office 17 April 2014 – 23 January 2017
Premier	Mike Baird
Preceded by	Andrew Constance
Succeeded by	Victor Dominello
Electorates
Member of the New South Wales Parliament for Epping
In office 23 March 2019 – 12 August 2024
Preceded by	Damien Tudehope
Succeeded by	Monica Tudehope
Member of the New South Wales Parliament for Hawkesbury
In office 28 March 2015 – 23 March 2019
Preceded by	Ray Williams
Succeeded by	Robyn Preston
Member of the New South Wales Parliament for Castle Hill
In office 26 March 2011 – 28 March 2015
Preceded by	Michael Richardson
Succeeded by	Ray Williams

Personal details
- Born: 21 September 1982 (age 44) West Pennant Hills, New South Wales, Australia
- Party: Liberal
- Education: Redfield College; Oakhill College
- Alma mater: University of Sydney (LLB, BCom)
- Occupation: Lawyer; Politician
- Cabinet: First (2021), Second (2021–2023)
- Website: domperrottet.com.au

Dominic Francis Perrottet (/ˈpɛroʊteɪ/ PERR-oh-TAY; born 21 September 1982) is an Australian politician who served as the 46th premier of New South Wales from 2021 to 2023. He held office as leader of the New South Wales division of the Liberal Party of Australia, and assumed the position following the resignation of Gladys Berejiklian.

Perrottet previously served as treasurer of New South Wales and deputy leader of the New South Wales Liberal Party from January 2017 to October 2021, and was a member of the New South Wales Legislative Assembly representing the seat of Epping from the 2019 state election until his resignation in 2024. He represented Castle Hill from 2011 to 2015 and Hawkesbury from 2015 to 2019. Perrottet served as Minister for Industrial Relations in the first Berejiklian ministry and as Minister for Finance, Services and Property in the first and second Baird ministries.

After the resignation of Berejiklian in October 2021, Perrottet won a leadership election to become the new premier and leader of the Liberal Party. He would lose power 18 months later in the 2023 state election, and resigned as leader shortly thereafter. In July 2024, he announced his resignation from the Legislative Assembly.

== Early life and background ==
Perrottet was born in 1982, and raised in West Pennant Hills, Sydney. He is the third oldest of 12 children. He is of Swiss French descent. As of 2019, his father, John Perrottet, works for the World Bank as the Global Lead for Tourism at the International Finance Corporation, in Washington, D.C. Perrottet's family were members of the Catholic prelature, Opus Dei.

Perrottet was educated at private schools Oakhill College in Castle Hill and Redfield College in Dural. Perrottet was active in student politics while studying commerce and law at the University of Sydney and campaigned for voluntary student unionism. He went on to work as a commercial lawyer for Henry Davis York in the areas of banking restructuring and insolvency law.

Perrottet was the President of the NSW Young Liberals Movement in 2005 and served on the NSW State Executive of the Liberal Party from 2008 to 2011.

== Political career ==
=== Early career ===
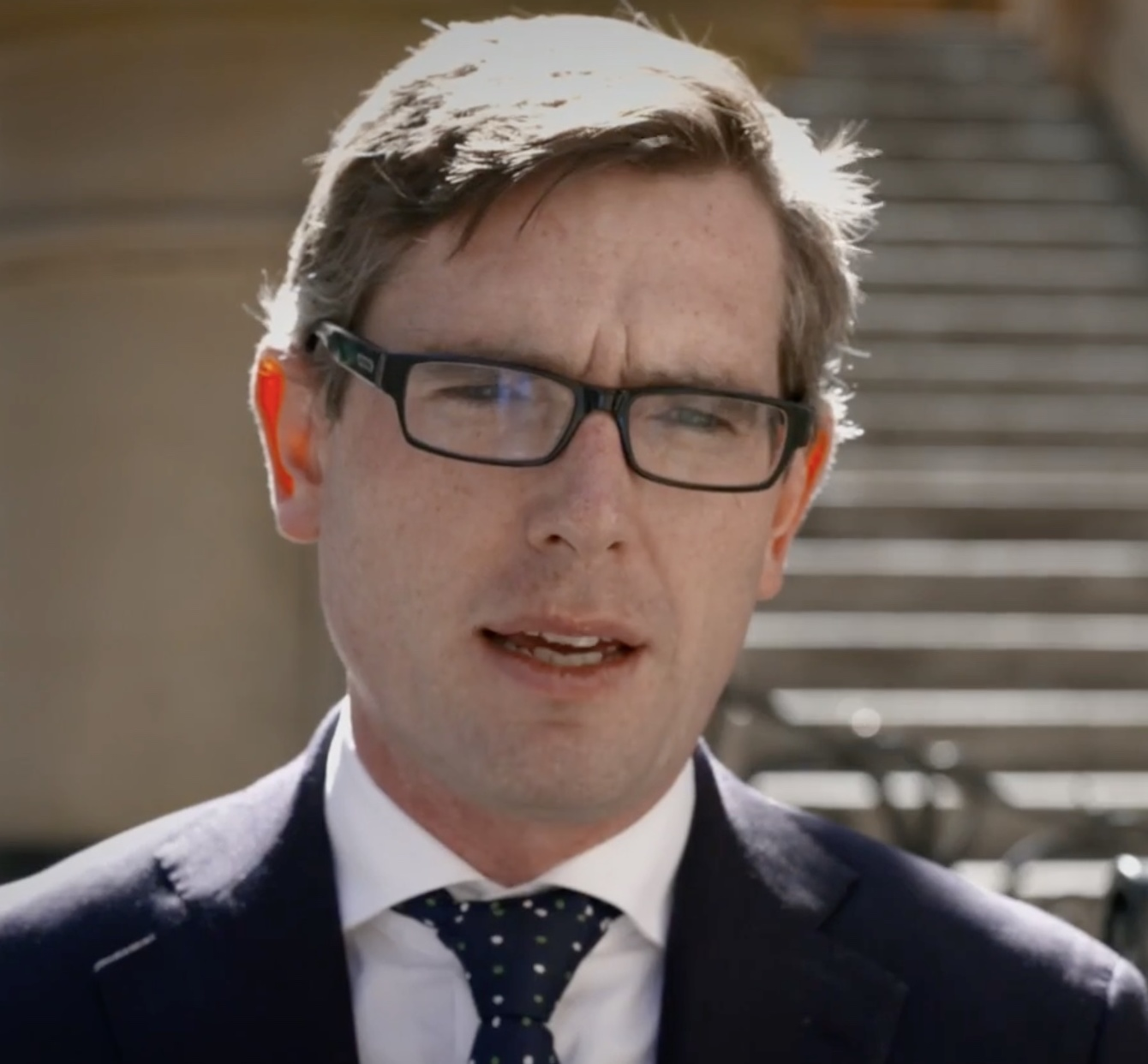
Perrottet in 2016

Following the resignation of sitting Liberal MP Michael Richardson, Perrottet won Liberal preselection for the very safe Liberal seat of Castle Hill in November 2010, with the backing of right-wing power broker David Clarke. Clarke battled against Alex Hawke, Federal Member for Mitchell, to gain control of preselections. At the 2011 state election, Perrottet was elected with a swing of 12.2 points, winning 80.8 per cent of the two-party vote.

With the resignation of Barry O'Farrell as premier, and the subsequent ministerial reshuffle by Mike Baird, the new Liberal leader, Perrottet was appointed as Minister for Finance and Services in April 2014.

Following a redistribution of electoral boundaries, Perrottet traded seats with fellow Liberal Ray Williams for the 2015 state election. Perrottet handed Castle Hill to Williams to run in Williams' equally safe seat of Hawkesbury. Perrottet was elected with 68 per cent of the two-party preferred vote.

After the resignation of Baird as Premier, the main factions of the NSW Liberals agreed to support his deputy, Gladys Berejiklian, as his successor, with Perrottet as her deputy. Berejiklian is from the party's moderate wing, while Perrottet is from the conservative wing. Accordingly, on 23 January 2017, Berejiklian and Perrottet were unanimously elected as leader and deputy leader of the NSW Liberal Party. Later that day, Berejiklian was sworn in as New South Wales' second female Premier.

=== Treasurer (2017–2021) ===
When Berejiklian reshuffled her ministry, Perrottet took over her former ministerial roles as Treasurer and Minister for Industrial Relations, with effect from 30 January 2017. In the lead up to the 2019 state election, Perrottet attempted to wrest Castle Hill back from Williams, citing work-life balance as Hawkesbury was too far for him to travel. This was unsuccessful, with Williams retaining the Liberal preselection, and resulted in media reports of significant party infighting and Perrottet publicly apologising. Eventually, Perrottet abandoned the Hawkesbury preselection, and he settled on his second-choice, the equally safe seat of Epping. At the 2019 state election Perrottet was elected as Member for Epping and reappointed as Treasurer in the second Berejiklian ministry.

As Treasurer, Perrottet delivered five budgets between 2017 and 2021, the last two during the COVID-19 pandemic.

His first budget, handed down in June 2017, forecast a surplus of $2.7 billion for 2017-18 and committed to a record multi-year infrastructure program covering transport, schools and hospitals. It abolished stamp duty for first-home buyers on properties up to $650,000 and introduced the Active Kids rebate, a $100 voucher towards children's sport.

The 2018-19 budget, delivered in June 2018, reported a $3.9 billion surplus for 2017-18 and a third consecutive year of negative net debt, while retaining the state's AAA credit rating. It established the NSW Generations Fund, a debt-retirement and investment fund, and raised the payroll tax threshold to reduce the burden on small business.

The 2019-20 budget, his first after the 2019 election, projected a surplus of about $1 billion and a record $93 billion infrastructure program over four years.

Delivered in November 2020 during the COVID-19 pandemic and the first national recession in almost three decades, the 2020-21 budget forecast a deficit of about $16 billion alongside a record infrastructure program and pandemic-support spending. It proposed allowing property buyers to choose an annual land tax instead of stamp duty, a reform later legislated for first-home buyers in 2022.

His fifth and final budget, in June 2021, forecast a $7.9 billion deficit for 2021-22 with a return to surplus projected by 2024-25, and a $108.5 billion infrastructure pipeline. It made New South Wales the first state to offer paid miscarriage leave to public-sector employees.

==== icare controversy ====
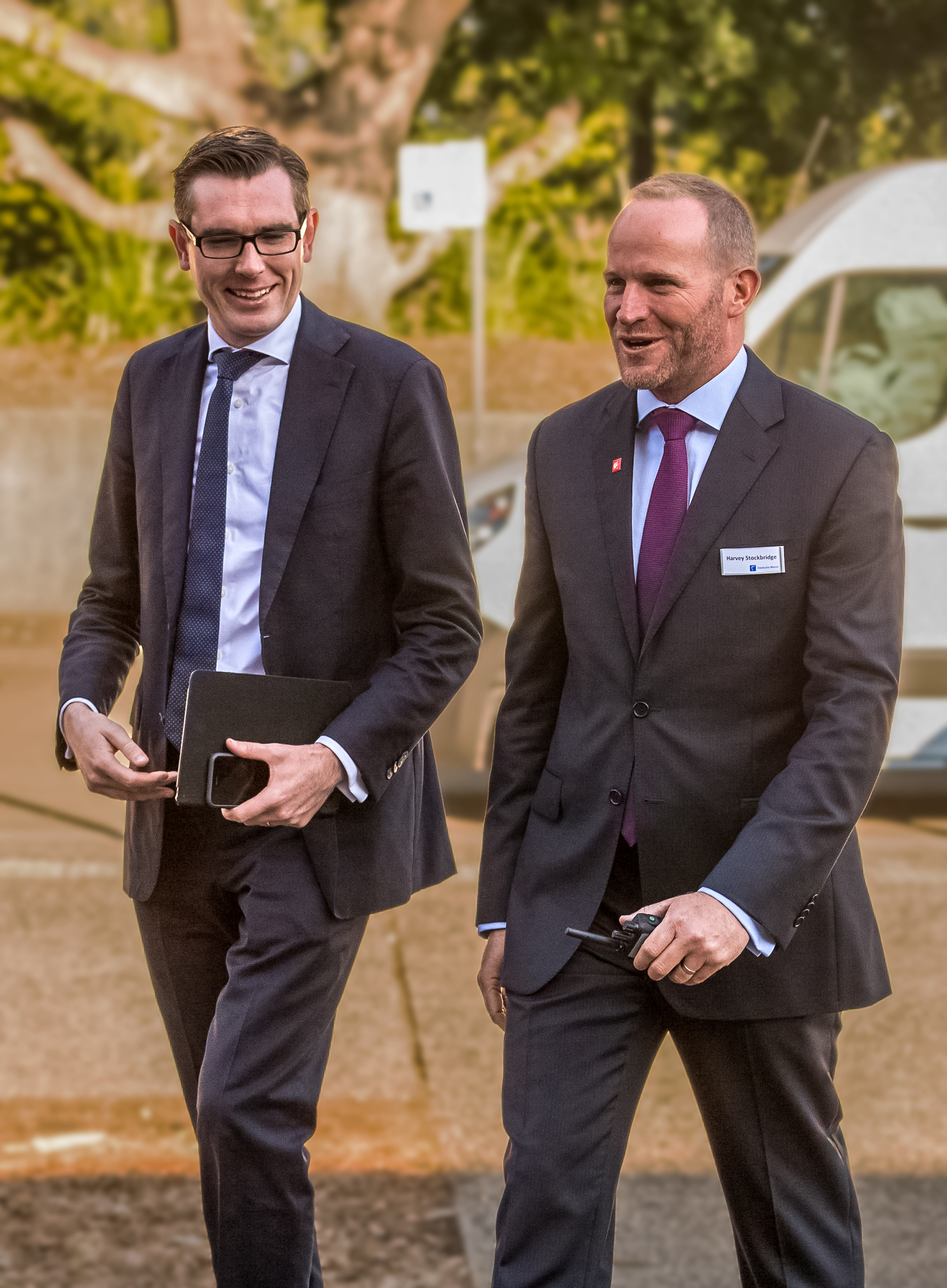
Perrottet at the CeBIT Australia Conference and Exhibition 2016, as the Minister for Finance, Services and Property

Perrottet's record as NSW Treasurer was marred by allegations that his department mismanaged the state's workers compensation scheme, icare. A combined investigation by The Age, The Sydney Morning Herald and ABC TV's Four Corners found that icare had underpaid as many as 52,000 injured workers by up to $80 million and that the organisation was close to collapse. Following the investigation, NSW's workers' compensation regulator State Insurance Regulatory Authority (SIRA) announced in August 2020 that it would be applying increased scrutiny to icare's 2020 financial audit. icare was also accused of improperly handling private sector contracts. The Information and Privacy Commission NSW found that icare had not publicly registered 422 contracts since 2015, each worth more than $150,000. These contracts include some being awarded without a competitive tender to companies associated with Liberal Party figures, such as marketing firm IVE Group being awarded millions of dollars in contracts. IVE Group is run by former NSW Liberal party president Geoff Selig.

An internal note among senior figures in the NSW Treasury in 2018 raised a concern that "a direct line to [Perrottet] means icare often bypasses Treasury". The Sydney Morning Herald reported on the note in 2020 and noted that other concerns raised included icare's non-compliance with recruitment policies and limited disclosures of capital expenditures. Scrutiny of Perrottet's close relationship with icare prompted him to direct Treasury Secretary Michael Pratt to audit the Treasurer's staffing arrangements, which the NSW Labor Party criticised as a "sham" as the Secretary was a former deputy chairman of icare.

In April 2021 the NSW parliament's Law and Justice Committee tabled its 2020 review of the Workers' Compensation Scheme. The report highlighted the deteriorating financial position of the scheme, a fall in return to work rates and an increase in claim costs, including medical expenses. The committee's chairman said "icare's decision and ambitious approach to implementing a new claims management model has also played a role, to the detriment of injured workers and the public". A statutory review by the NSW Government was released on the same day, with the reviewer the Hon Robert McDougall QC saying execution of the program was "sloppy" and "the result of these shortcomings was that procurements for the [Nominal Insurer]—often involving very large sums of money—were conducted on an opaque basis".

==== COVID-19 pandemic ====
Perrottet advocated strongly for business activity in the face of lockdowns and advice from health officials. During the northern beaches lockdown at the end of 2020, he suggested that the state's chief health officer, Kerry Chant, take a pay cut if Sydney or its suburbs were unnecessarily locked down. Perrottet also pushed the federal government to reinstate JobKeeper payments for Sydney residents in July 2021 as a new wave of infections was beginning.

As Treasurer, Perrottet was one of the architects of the JobSaver program and oversaw micro business support payments, payroll tax waivers and deferrals, vouchers for spending in CBD businesses and other support for businesses affected by the epidemic.

Perrottet opposed his cabinet colleagues and the advice of NSW Health when they extended a COVID lockdown on 7 July 2021.

As vaccination rates rose in late 2021, Perrottet accelerated New South Wales' reopening from the Delta-variant lockdown, easing limits on gatherings, retail and hospitality and bringing forward the return of students to school once the state passed 70 per cent full vaccination. Some changes were announced without the Chief Health Officer present and were not endorsed by her, and the Australian Medical Association warned that the faster pace carried increased risk; the reopening was nonetheless welcomed by many businesses after months of lockdown.

=== Premier of New South Wales (2021–2023) ===
On 3 October 2021, following the resignation of Premier Gladys Berejiklian, Perrottet was nominated to run as NSW Liberal Party leader, with Stuart Ayres, the Minister for Jobs, Investment, Tourism and Western Sydney, as his deputy. Having struck a deal with party powerbrokers, he was elected leader by the Liberal party room when it met on 5 October, and was sworn in as premier later that day. At 39 years of age, Perrottet became the youngest premier in New South Wales history, surpassing the previous record held by Nathan Rees, who was 40 when he first took office.

In April 2022 his government passed an anti-protest law, which was criticised by human rights groups as being repressive and anti-democratic. The new law would see protesters who block rail, ports and roads jailed for 2 years and fined 22,000 dollars for "disruption."

In June 2022 the Perrottet government announced plans to fly the Aboriginal flag on the Sydney Harbour Bridge, at the cost of 25 million dollars. This was seen as a hypocritical move by some, as in 2018 he lashed out at the same proposal by then-Opposition Leader Luke Foley, branding the proposal as 'virtue signaling.'

In late June 2022 controversy arose following the appointment of former Deputy Premier John Barilaro to a lucrative trade role. Controversy focused over the allegations that the appointment and selection process was interfered with and adjusted in favour of Barilaro, with specific focus placed on Trade Minister and deputy Liberal leader Stuart Ayres, with Investment NSW boss Amy Brown stating that he was "not at arms length from the process." Ayres resigned as a result from the fallout in early August 2022, being replaced as deputy Liberal leader by Treasurer Matt Kean. Controversy also came from Perrottet's perceived poor handling of the situation, reports that he told Barilaro to "go for it", and allegations that he promised Transport Minister David Elliott a job outside of politics, some reports stating that he was offered the position of Governor.

In late July 2022 further controversy emerged over allegations of bullying and mistreatment of staff by then-Fair Trading Minister Eleni Petinos, resulting in her sacking from the cabinet. Soon after, the resignation letter of the then-NSW Building Commissioner was released, blaming relations with Petinos for his decision. Allegations were also raised of potential interference between Petinos and removals of stop work orders placed on development company Coronation Property, a company employing Barilaro and implicated with links to gangs.

Toward the end of September opinion polls showed significant drops in popularity, with Labor establishing a substantial lead over the Coalition—drops widely linked with the fallout from the controversies.

Perrottet supports the Voice to Parliament.

From October 2022, Perrottet pursued a major overhaul of the state's poker-machine industry, arguing that it profited from problem gambling and pointing to a NSW Crime Commission finding that gaming machines were being used to launder money. In February 2023 he committed, if re-elected, to requiring every poker machine in the state to operate through a mandatory cashless gaming card by the end of 2028, incorporating features such as player-set spending limits and breaks in play, and to banning political donations from clubs and pubs. The policy put Perrottet at odds with the industry lobby ClubsNSW; he became the first Coalition leader not to sign a memorandum of understanding with the group, telling reporters he was "not here for ClubsNSW". The reform was not legislated before the 2023 election, which the Coalition lost. The incoming Labor government, which had committed only to a limited trial, proceeded with a smaller cashless-gaming pilot.

Perrottet pursued a partial replacement of stamp duty with an annual property tax. The 2020-21 budget proposed allowing buyers to choose an annual land tax instead of upfront stamp duty. In the June 2022 budget his government introduced First Home Buyer Choice, allowing first-home buyers of property worth up to $1.5 million to opt for an annual property tax in place of upfront stamp duty. The option took effect in January 2023. After the Coalition lost the 2023 election, the incoming Labor government abolished First Home Buyer Choice from 1 July 2023, replacing it with higher stamp-duty exemption and concession thresholds for first-home buyers.

==== Nazi uniform scandal ====
On 12 January 2023, Perrottet revealed that he had worn a Nazi uniform as fancy dress at his 21st birthday, apologising at a media conference after a cabinet minister was made aware of the incident. Rumours circulated that a photo of Perrottet and the uniform had been uncovered, but Perrottet denied any knowledge of the photograph and stated that his parents explained to him why the costume was inappropriate the day after the party. Transport Minister David Elliott stated that he had warned Perrottet about his political opponents knowing that he had worn the uniform and one of them was conspiring to use it against him.

A poll found that 67% said the Nazi uniform scandal would not make a difference to their vote, 20% said it would make then less likely to vote for the Coalition and 8% said the scandal would make them more likely to vote for the Coalition.

The Shooters, Fishers and Farmers Party will refer Perrottet to the NSW Police Force regarding whether Perrottet disclosed wearing a Nazi uniform as fancy dress at his 21st birthday as part of his preselection bid. At the time, Perrottet declared he had nothing to disclose that could embarrass the Liberal Party. Robert Borsak, the leader of the Shooters, Fishers and Farmers Party, argued that this could have potentially broken the Oaths Act, which is punishable by up to 5 years in jail.

==== 2023 state election loss and resignation as Liberal leader ====
As much of the vote came in for the election, speculation emerged if Perrottet would maintain his seat of Epping after there was 'tossup' between Labor candidate Alan Mascarenhas and himself. Eventually, Antony Green from the ABC announced that Perrottet would retain his seat with an eight-point swing to Labor, challenging a traditionally 'safe' Liberal seat.

Perrottet's Liberal–National coalition lost the election to Chris Minns and the Labor Party on 25 March 2023, ending over twelve years of Liberal/National rule. NSW Labor's victory meant Labor governments controlled every mainland state in Australia as well as at the federal level. Tasmania became the only state under Liberal control until David Crisafulli led the LNP to victory in 2024 in Queensland.

As counting continued on election night it soon became clear that only Labor could realistically form government and the only question was if it would be a majority or minority Government. Perrottet conceded the election to Minns and resigned as NSW Liberal leader. In his concession speech he described the election as a "race to the top" and "battle of ideas."

On 19 July 2024, Perrottet announced his resignation from the NSW parliament to take effect in August, after 13 years of public service. His former deputy chief of staff Monica Tudehope succeeded him in the 2024 Epping by-election.

== Political positions ==
Perrottet has been described as both conservative and moderate or liberal.

Perrottet is the leader of the National Right or right-wing faction of the NSW Liberal Party. Previously backed to be Premier of NSW by conservative former Prime Minister John Howard, Perrottet was described by the Australian Financial Review as the "great hope in Australia for political conservatives". Perrottet has been described as a conservative Catholic; he voted against decriminalising abortion in 2019 and voluntary euthanasia legislation in 2021.

In his maiden speech to NSW Parliament in 2011 he stated a belief in "exercising freedom [so] that individuals can develop the habits of generosity, hard work, fairness and concern for others". He also stated that traditionalism and libertarianism are both "vital and necessary strands of the fabric of conservative thought" and that the Liberal Party should embrace both. He stated opposition to "more social engineering, more welfare handouts... more government spending and intervention in our lives".

Despite his personal views being conservative, during his time as Premier, Perrottet backed many liberal reforms, such as a ban on gay conversion therapy and gambling reform while still maintaining a strong support for religious freedom.

== Personal life ==
Perrottet is married to Helen and has eight children. Perrottet has two brothers named Jean-Claude and Charles. He also has a sister-in-law named Anita who is married to Charles.

Perrottet is a Catholic, which has influenced many of his political views such as those on abortion.

Perrottet is a supporter of NRL club the Wests Tigers.

== Post political career ==
Following his resignation from parliament, Perrottet took a senior role at BHP's office in Washington, D.C., working as the company's liaison for US government and external affairs. In December 2025 he was promoted to vice-president, international affairs and US.

In June 2025, Perrottet was appointed by Treasurer Daniel Mookhey to the board of TCorp (the New South Wales Treasury Corporation), the state government's central borrowing and investment authority, which manages public sector debt and invests funds on behalf of New South Wales. Mookhey, a Labor minister, said the appointment was intended to keep the body's governance "above politics".

== See also ==
- Baird ministry (2014–2015)
- Baird ministry (2015–2017)
- Berejiklian ministry (2017–2019)
- Berejiklian ministry (2019–2021)
- Second Perrottet ministry

== Notes ==
New South Wales Legislative Assembly
Preceded by Michael Richardson	Member for Castle Hill; 2011–2015	Succeeded by Ray Williams
Preceded by Ray Williams	Member for Hawkesbury; 2015–2019	Succeeded by Robyn Preston
Preceded by Damien Tudehope	Member for Epping; 2019–2024	Succeeded by Monica Tudehope
Political offices
Preceded by Andrew Constance	Minister for Finance and Services; 2014–2017	Succeeded by Victor Dominello
Vacant	Minister for Property; 2015–2017	Succeeded by Victor Dominello
Preceded by Gladys Berejiklian	Minister for Industrial Relations; 2017–2019	Succeeded by Don Harwin as Minister for the Public Service and Employee Relations, Aboriginal Affairs and the Arts
Preceded by Gladys Berejiklian	Treasurer of New South Wales; 2017–2021	Succeeded by Matt Kean
Preceded by Gladys Berejiklian	Premier of New South Wales; 2021–2023	Succeeded by Chris Minns
Party political offices
Preceded by Gladys Berejiklian	Deputy Leader of the New South Wales Liberal Party; 2017–2021	Succeeded by Stuart Ayres
Preceded by Gladys Berejiklian	Leader of the New South Wales Liberal Party; 2021–2023	Succeeded by Mark Speakman
