= West Pennant Hills =

- Suburb
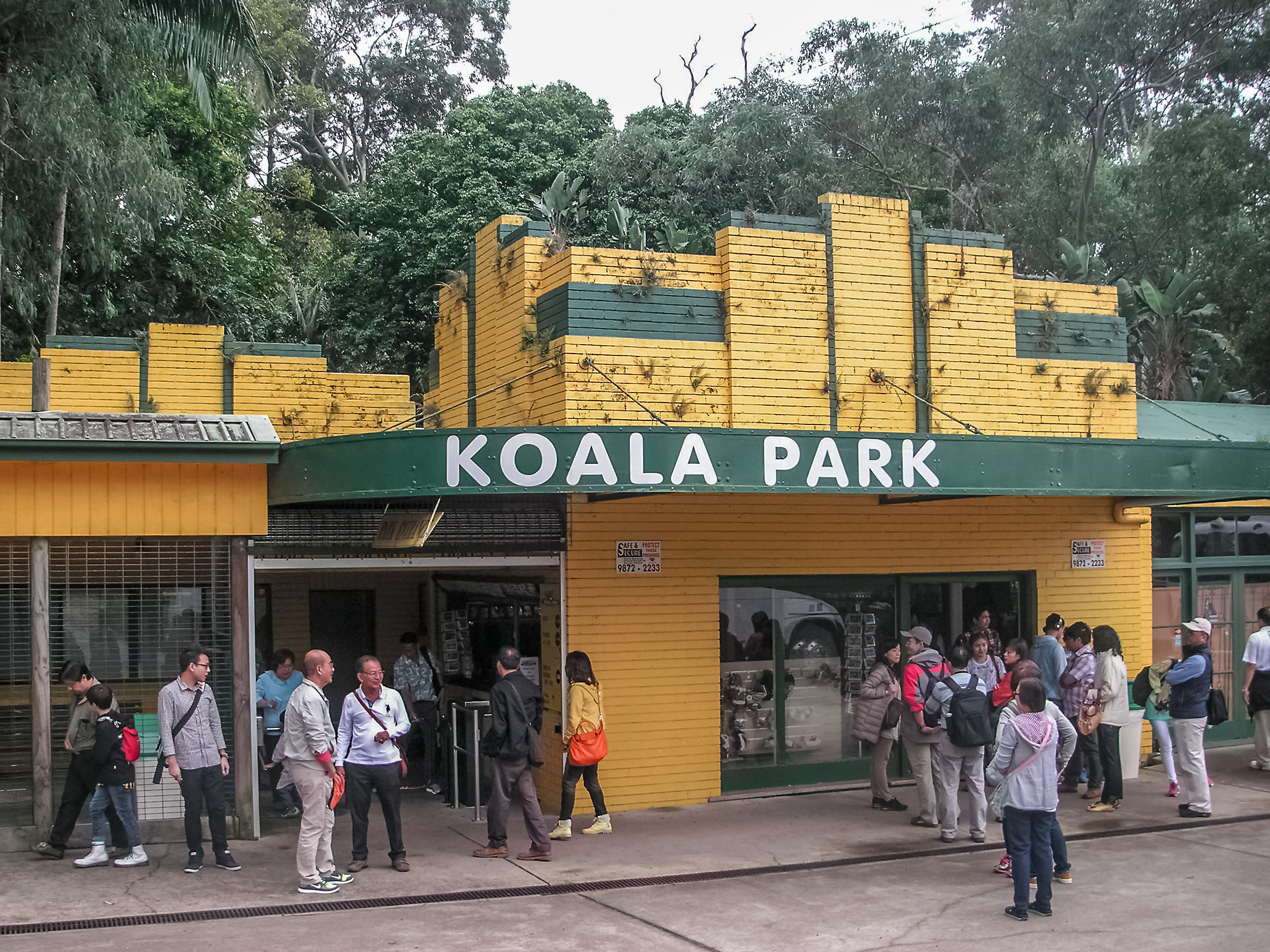
- Koala Park

- Interactive map of West Pennant Hills
- Country: Australia
- State: New South Wales
- City: Sydney
- LGAs: The Hills Shire; Hornsby Shire
- Location: 21 km (13 mi) NW of Sydney CBD
- Established: 1796

Government
  - State electorate: Castle Hill
  - Federal divisions: Mitchell; Berowra
- Elevation: 176 m (577 ft)

Population
  - Total: 16,620 (2021 census)
- Postcode: 2125
Suburbs around West Pennant Hills
| Castle Hill | Cherrybrook | Pennant Hills |
| Baulkham Hills | West Pennant Hills | Pennant Hills |
| North Rocks | Carlingford | Beecroft |

West Pennant Hills is a suburb in the Hills District of Sydney, New South Wales, Australia. West Pennant Hills is located 21 km northwest of the Sydney central business district in the local government areas of The Hills Shire and Hornsby Shire.

== Commercial area ==
West Pennant Hills is a residential suburb with a commercial area located at Thompsons Corner, also the site of the suburb's government primary school, West Pennant Hills Public School.

Cherrybrook railway station is located to the north of West Pennant Hills near Castle Hill Road and nearby there is another shopping complex on Coonara Avenue, where a Woolworths supermarket, restaurants and several other small shops are located.

== History ==
Thompsons Corner is named after Andrew Thompson (1773–1810), a convict (see Scotland Island), who received a grant of 100 acres (0.40 km^{2}) in 1796 opposite the signal station in Pennant Hills. Workmen on the railway from Strathfield to Hornsby established a camp and stores depot there in about 1890. During Lachlan Macquarie's governorship (1810–1821), a timbersawing establishment stood near today's Thompsons Corner. In those early days the pit-sawyers roamed the countryside, and the saw pits were set up at various places close to forest areas. In the early 1990s, one of the last mills was demolished, having stood at the bottom of Hill Road.

The suburb was named for both its geological features and its man-made additions. When Sydney was first established, 'Pennant Hills', applied to the range of hills stretching north from Parramatta. The Pennant refers to a flag pole erected on the area's highest point. During the first years of the Sydney settlement this flag pole with its pennant was a form of early communication between the government in Parramatta and the governor's outer Sydney residence. It was used to signal to Parramatta that the governor was returning to Parramatta after spending time at his retreat in the outer areas of Sydney. When his horse-drawn carriage went past Thompsons Corner, the pennant would be raised and, as this was in clear sight of the Parramatta garrison, they would prepare for his return in a few days. Local stories twist this system to say that when the pennant was raised the soldiers would have to stop drinking and clean up the streets after running amok in his absence.

In 1850, at a time when the combined population of Field of Mars Common and Castle Hill numbered fewer than 3,000 people, Henry Parkes approved, on behalf of the Board of National Education in New South Wales, the appointment of local patrons for the commencement of Pennant Hills Public School. Botany, Fort Street, Smithfield and Pennant Hills were the first metropolitan schools under the control of the newly constituted Board. The school first opened under the name of Pennant Hills Public School when the township of Pennant Hills was centred on the ridge at the intersection of Pennant Hills and Castle Hill Roads, which was a trading point on the way north. When the railway station line came through the area, a new school was built in 1925 closer to the railway station, to be known as 'Pennant Hills East'. West was added to the name of the original school and it became 'Pennant Hills West' and eventually the area around Thompsons Corner became known as West Pennant Hills.

Pennant Hills Post Office opened on 1 January 1867 and was renamed West Pennant Hills on 1 August 1898, due to the Pennant Hills Railway Station office (opened two months earlier) being given the name Pennant Hills.

West Pennant Hills was split off from Pennant Hills as a separate suburb on 23 August 1986.

== Parks and recreation ==
Tourist attractions include the Cumberland State Forest and the Koala Park Sanctuary.

== Population ==
At the 2021 census, West Pennant Hills recorded a population of 16,374. Of these:

- The median age was 43 years. Children aged 0–14 years made up 18.3% of the population and people aged 65 years and over made up 20.0% of the population.
- 57.5% of people were born in Australia. The most common countries of birth were China 8.6%, India 4.3%, Hong Kong 3.5%, England 2.9%, and Sri Lanka 1.9%.
- 58.7% of people only spoke English at home. Other languages spoken at home included Mandarin 11.1%, Cantonese 7.4%, Korean 2.3%, Hindi 2.1%, and Arabic 1.5%.
- The most common responses for religion were No Religion 31.5%, Catholic 25.0%, Anglican 12.4%, Hinduism 5.7%, and Buddhism 4.1%.
- The median weekly household income for the suburb was $3,078.

== Notable people ==
- Dame Alice Chisholm - humanitarian
- Damien Tudehope - politician
- Dominic Perrottet - Former Premier of New South Wales
- Captain Francis de Groot - activist, who lived at Dunrath, 139 Castle Hill Road, and who upstaged Premier Lang at the opening of the Sydney Harbour bridge
- Len Beadell - explorer
- Guntis Sics - nominated for Best Sound Oscar for Moulin Rouge! (2002)
