= Eçara =

- Location within Azerbaijan
- Coordinates: 39°13′02″N 48°22′23″E
- Country: Azerbaijan
- Rayon: Jalilabad
- Time zone: UTC+4 (AZT)
  - Summer (DST): UTC+5 (AZT)

Eçara (officially known as İcarə until 2013) is a village in the Jalilabad Rayon of Azerbaijan. It forms part of the municipality of Ləzran
