= Icare (insurance) =

State insurance company in NSW, Australia

icare is a state-run, insurance corporation. It is owned by the New South Wales Government.

Its primary purpose is to provide workplace injury insurance.

== History ==
It was formed in September 2015 through the commencement of the State Insurance and Care Governance Act.

It succeeded the since-abolished WorkCover Authority of New South Wales. This followed a recommendation that WorkCover have its insurance and workplace safety investigation roles separated.

In 2020 a joint investigation by Four Corners, Sydney Morning Herald and The Age found that the organization was losing hundreds of millions of dollars per year, and had serious mismanagement issues.

== Governance ==
Its board is accountable to the Treasurer of NSW, who appoints the board and CEO.

== See also ==
- WorkCover Authority of New South Wales
