= Christensen (surname) =

Christensen (Danish pronunciation: [ˈkʰʁestn̩sn̩, ˈkʰʁæstn̩sn̩]), is a Danish (and Norwegian) patronym-derived surname, literally meaning son of Christen, a sideform of Christian. The spelling variant Kristensen has identical pronunciation. Christensen is the sixth most common name in Denmark, shared by about 2% of the population. In Norway and Sweden the name can also be spelled Christenson or Kristenson.

The numbers of bearers of the surnames Christensen and Kristensen in Denmark and Norway (2007):

	Christensen	Kristensen	source
Denmark	128,168	63,487	Statistics Denmark
Norway	6,399	7,022	Statistics Norway

Immigrants to English-speaking countries sometimes have changed the spelling to Christenson or Kristenson.

== List of names ==
Christensen, as a person, may refer to:

- Alex Christensen (born 1967), German musician
- Alfred Christensen (1905–1974), Danish chess player
- Allen Christensen, multiple people
- Andreas Christensen (born 1996), Danish footballer
- Andrew Christensen, American psychologist
- Andrine Christensen (1814–1853), Norwegian actress and dancer
- Anita Christensen (born 1971), Danish boxer
- Anna Christensen (1936–2001), Swedish professor and columnist
- Arne Søby Christensen (born 1945), Danish historian
- Arthur Christensen (1875–1945), Danish orientalist and historian
- Bekim Christensen (born 1973), Danish cycle racer
- Benjamin Christensen (1879–1959), Danish actor and director
- Bent Christensen Arensøe (born 1967), Danish football player
- Bo Christensen (1937–2020), Danish film producer
- Brady Christensen (born 1996), American football player
- Bruce Christensen (born 1948), American baseball player
- Carina Christensen (born 1972), Danish politician
- Carl Christensen (1869–1936), last executioner in office for the government of Denmark
- Carl Christensen (1872–1942), Danish botanist
- C. C. A. Christensen (1831–1912), Danish-American artist
- Carl C. Christensen (1891–1956), American politician
- Carlos Hugo Christensen (1914–1999), Argentine film director and producer
- Casper Christensen (born 1968), Danish comedian
- Charlie Christensen (born 1958), Swedish cartoonist, best known for Arne Anka
- Christen Christensen (politician) (1826–1900), Norwegian military officer and politician
- Christen Christensen (shipowner) (1845–1923), Norwegian ship owner
- Clayton Christensen (1952–2020), American business consultant
- Cole Christensen, American politician
- Conrad Christensen (1882–1951), Norwegian Olympic gymnast
- Corine Christensen (1955–1986), American murder victim
- Cory Christensen (born 1994), American curler
- Cuckoo Christensen, born Walter Niels Christensen (1889–1984), American baseball player
- Dan Christensen (1942–2007), American artist
- Diana Christensen, fictional character in the film Network (1976)
- Don R. Christensen (1916–2006), American animator and cartoonist
- Donna Christian-Christensen (born 1945), U. S. Virgin Islands physician, journalist and politician
- Eigil Friis-Christensen (1944–2018), Danish physicist
- Elisabeth Dons Christensen (born 1944), Danish Lutheran bishop
- Else Christensen (1913–2005), Danish paganist
- Emil Christensen (born 1984), Swedish computer game player
- Eric Christensen (disambiguation)
- Erik Christensen (born 1983), Canadian ice hockey player
- Erika Christensen (born 1982), American actress
- Flemming Christensen (born 1958), Danish football player
- Frank Christensen (1910–2001), American businessman and college athlete
- Fred J. Christensen (1921–2006), American fighter pilot
- George Christensen (1909–1968), American football player
- George Christensen (born 1978), Australian politician
- Gunnar Christensen (1913–1986), Danish track athlete, hammer thrower and police officer
- Hans Christensen (footballer) (1906–1992), Danish footballer
- Hans Christensen (silversmith) (1924–1983), Danish-born American silversmith
- Harold Christensen (1904–1989), American ballet personality
- Hayden Christensen (born 1981), Canadian actor
- Heather Christensen (born 1979), American model
- Helen Christensen, Australian mental health researcher
- Helena Christensen (born 1968), Danish supermodel
- Hjalmar Christensen (1869–1925), Norwegian writer
- Inger Christensen (1935–2009), Danish writer
- Ione Christensen (1933–2025), Canadian politician
- J. C. Christensen (1856–1930), Danish politician
- James C. Christensen (1942–2017), American artist
- Jasin Christensen (1976-present), American musician (aka J Sinner Christen) and artist
- Jesper Christensen (born 1948), Danish actor
- Jesper Bøje Christensen (born 1944), Danish harpsichordist and music researcher
- Jim Christensen, Australian economist
- Joe J. Christensen (1929–2021), American Mormon educator
- John Christensen (disambiguation), multiple people
- Jon Christensen (1943–2020), Norwegian jazz musician
- Jon Lynn Christensen (born 1963), American businessman and politician
- Jørn Christensen (born 1959), Norwegian music figure
- Julie Christensen (born 1956), American singer
- Julie Christensen, fictional character in the film Final Destination 3 (2006)
- Kaare Christensen (born 1959), Danish epidemiologist
- Kayte Christensen (born 1980), American basketball player
- Kerry Christensen (born 1954), American yodeler
- Kim Christensen (born 1979), Danish football player
- Kim Christensen (born 1980), Danish football player
- L. Royal Christensen (1915–1997), American microbiologist
- Lars Christensen (1884–1965), Norwegian shipowner and whaling magnate
- Lars Lindberg Christensen (born 1970), Danish academic
- Lars Saabye Christensen (born 1953), Norwegian author
- LaVar Christensen (born 1953), American politician
- Leif Christensen (1950–1988), Danish musician
- Leland Christensen (1959–2022), American politician
- Lew Christensen (1909–1984), American ballet personality
- Mads Christensen (1856–1929), New Zealand Lutheran pastor from Denmark
- Martin Christensen (born 1987), Danish football player
- McKay Christensen (born 1975), American baseball player
- Mogens Christensen (1929–2020), Norwegian luger
- Morten Christensen, multiple people
- Mose Christensen (1871–1920), American musician
- Niels Christensen (1855–1952), Danish-American inventor
- Ole Christensen (born 1955), Danish politician
- Ove Christensen (born 1950), Danish football coach
- Parley Parker Christensen (1869–1954), American politician
- Pelle Christensen (1923–1995), Norwegian actor and translator
- Per Christensen (curling) (born 1955), Danish curler and coach
- Pernille Fischer Christensen (born 1969), Danish film director
- Pernille Christensen (born 1974), Danish politician
- Peter Christensen (disambiguation)
- Phil Christensen (born 1953), American geologist
- Reinhardt Kristensen (born 1948), Danish invertebrate biologist
- Sophy A. Christensen (1867–1955), carpenter and furniture designer
- Søren Christensen (born 1986), Danish football player
- Søren Peter Christensen (1884–1927), Danish gymnast
- Steen Christensen (born 1964), Danish criminal
- Thomas Guldborg Christensen (born 1984), Danish football player
- Tim Christensen (born 1974), Danish musician
- Todd Christensen (1956–2013), American football player and sports broadcaster
- Tonja Christensen (born 1971), American model
- Tom Christensen (disambiguation)
- Tom Kristensen (disambiguation)
- Trevor Christensen (born 1993), American DJ
- Ute Christensen (born 1955), German actress
- Villy Christensen, Canadian fisheries scientist
- Ward Christensen (1945–2024), founder of the first online bulletin board system
- Willam Christensen (1902–2001), American ballet personality
- Wendy Christensen, fictional character in the film Final Destination 3 (2006)
