= Kristensen =

Kristensen is a surname of Danish origin. People with the surname include:

- Alex Dominique Kristensen Vanopslagh (born 1991), French-born Danish politician
- Allan Steen Kristensen (1958–1997), Danish criminal
- André Kristensen (born 2000), Norwegian handball player
- Anna Kristensen (born 2000), Danish handball player
- Bjørn Kristensen, multiple people
- Caryl Kristensen (born 1960), American comedian
- Claus Kristensen (born 1977), Danish motorcycle speedway rider
- Dorrit Kristensen (born 1938), Danish swimmer
- Doug Kristensen (born 1995), American politician
- Eivin Kristensen (1926–2005), Danish rower
- Elias Jelert Kristensen (born 2003), Danish footballer
- Ellen Christoffersen (née Kristensen; born 1972), Greenlandic politician
- Else Mærsk-Kristensen (born 1952), Danish rower
- Erik S. Kristensen (1972–2005), lieutenant commander of the US Navy SEALs
- Fredrik Kristensen Dahl (born 1999), Norwegian footballer
- Harry Kristensen (1915–1982), Danish racewalker
- Inger-Marie Kristensen (1932–2015), Norwegian politician
- Jørn Kristensen (born 1957), Danish wheelchair curler and Paralympian
- Kasper Kristensen, multiple people
- Katrine Kristensen (born 1996), Danish equestrian
- Knud Kristensen (1880–1962), Prime Minister of Denmark
- Knud Vældgaard Kristensen (born 1953), Danish politician
- Kristian Kristensen (born 1974), Danish handballer
- Kristian Kristensen (born 1992), Norwegian singer-songwriter
- Lennie Kristensen (born 1968), Danish cyclist
- Line Gyldenløve Kristensen (born 1987), Danish handball player
- Louise Kristensen (born 1992), Danish handball player
- Martin Kristensen (1921–1980), Danish footballer
- Mathias Kristensen, multiple people
- Mathilde Kristensen (born 1993), Danish handball player
- Mie Schjøtt-Kristensen (born 1984), Danish badminton player
- Monica Kristensen (born 1950), Norwegian scientist and novelist
- Nanna Kristensen-Randers (1864–1908), Danish lawyer and folk high school proponen
- Naja Kristensen (born 1968), Greenlandic politician
- Niels Bach Kristensen (born 1988), Danish footballer
- Niels Kristensen (1920–1999), Danish rower
- Oliver Bundgaard Kristensen (born 2001), Danish footballer
- Patrick Kristensen (born 1987), Danish footballer
- Rasmus Nissen Kristensen (born 1997), Danish footballer
- Reinhardt Kristensen (born 1948), Danish zoologist
- Rune Kristensen (born 1982), Danish politician
- Søren Kristensen (born 1971), Danish cricketer
- Tobias Bech Kristensen (born 2002), Danish footballer
- Tom Kristensen, multiple people
- Tommy Kristensen (born 1939), Danish racewalker
- Thomas Kristensen, multiple people
- Turid Kristensen (born 1966), Norwegian politician

== See also ==
- Kristensen Rocks, twin rocks in the Possession Islands group in the Ross Sea, Antarctica
- Kristensen Cabinet, government of Denmark under Knud Kristensen from November 7, 1945, to November 13, 1947
