= Cambodia national football team results (1950–1970) =

This article provides details of international football games played by the Cambodia national football team from 1950 to 1970.

== 1950 ==
8 March Friendly	Cambodia	3–1	Hong Kong	Saigon, State of Vietnam
		Report

== 1951 ==
21 January Hybrid Friendly	(Cambodia) Khémarith Kela	Unknown	Cambodia Selection	Phnom Penh, Cambodia
		Report		Stadium: Lambert Stadium

28 January Lambert Cup 1951	South Vietnam	5–2	Cambodia	Saigon, State of Vietnam
		Report

4 March Lambert Cup 1951	Cambodia	Unknown	South Vietnam	Phnom Penh, Cambodia
		Report		Stadium: Lambert Stadium

? December Hybrid Friendly	Cambodia Selection	Cancelled	(Sweden) Helsingborgs	Phnom Penh, Cambodia
		Report		Stadium: Lambert Stadium

== 1952 ==
11 May 1952 Coupe du Président Tran Van Huu	South Vietnam	7–0	Cambodia	Saigon, State of Vietnam
		Report

29 June 1952 Coupe du Président Tran Van Huu	Cambodia	1–4	South Vietnam	Phnom Penh, Cambodia
		Report		Stadium: Lambert Stadium

== 1953 ==
21 January Hybrid Friendly	Cambodia	2–4	(Austria) LASK	Phnom Penh, Cambodia
		Report		Stadium: Lambert Stadium

15 March 1953 Coupe du Président Tran Van Huu	Cambodia	0–3	South Vietnam	Phnom Penh, Cambodia
		Report		Stadium: Lambert Stadium

14 May Hybrid Friendly	(Cambodia) Mixed Selection	6–1	Cambodia Selection	Phnom Penh, Cambodia
		Report		Stadium: Lambert Stadium

9 December Hybrid Friendly	Cambodia	0–6	(Sweden) Djurgårdens	Phnom Penh, Cambodia
		Report		Stadium: Lambert Stadium; Attendance: 5,000

== 1954 ==
20 March Hybrid Friendly	Cambodia Selection	4–2	(Indonesia) Medan	Phnom Penh, Cambodia
		Report		Stadium: Lambert Stadium

21 March Hybrid Friendly	Cambodia Selection	4–2	(Indonesia) Medan	Phnom Penh, Cambodia
		Report		Stadium: Lambert Stadium

6 May Friendly	Cambodia	2–1	South Vietnam U-20	Phnom Penh, Cambodia
		Report		Stadium: Lambert Stadium

24 October Hybrid Friendly	(Cambodia) Phnom Penh Selection	Unknown	Cambodia Selection	Phnom Penh, Cambodia
		Report		Stadium: Lambert Stadium

Unknown Friendly	Cambodia	6–0	Thailand	Phnom Penh, Cambodia
		Report		Stadium: Lambert Stadium

1 November Friendly	Cambodia	7–1	Thailand	Phnom Penh, Cambodia
17:00 UTC+7	Manh 3', 27'; Thann 12', 52'; Lung 18', 61'; Vien-Em 33'	Report	? 14'	Stadium: Lambert Stadium; Referee: Ly Kim Phong (Cambodia)

21 November Hybrid Friendly	Cambodia Selection B	Unknown	Cambodia Selection	Phnom Penh, Cambodia
		Report		Stadium: Lambert Stadium

28 November Hybrid Friendly	Cambodia Selection B	Unknown	Cambodia Selection	Phnom Penh, Cambodia
		Report		Stadium: Lambert Stadium

4 December Hybrid Friendly	Cambodia	2–1	(Sweden) AIK	Phnom Penh, Cambodia
		Report		Stadium: Lambert Stadium

21 December Hybrid Friendly	(Thailand) Bangkok Selection	0–4	Cambodia	Bangkok, Thailand
		Report

22 December Friendly	Thailand	2–4	Cambodia	Bangkok, Thailand
		Report

== 1955 ==
25 November Friendly	Cambodia	Unknown	(France) French Military Selection of Saigon	Phnom Penh, Cambodia
		Report		Stadium: Lambert Stadium

27 November Friendly	Cambodia B	Unknown	(France) French Military Mission of Phnom Penh	Phnom Penh, Cambodia
		Report		Stadium: Lambert Stadium

27 November Friendly	Cambodia	0–2	South Vietnam	Phnom Penh, Cambodia
		Report		Stadium: Lambert Stadium

== 1956 ==
17 March 1956 AFC Asian Cup qualification	Malaya	9–2	Cambodia	Kuala Lumpur,Malaya
	Ghani 14', 25', 30', 35', 40', 45', 48'; Pang Siang Hock 20', 49'		Nguon Tuy 70'; Reith 71'	Stadium: Princes Road Stadium; Attendance: 4000; Referee: Greg de Silva (Singapore)

18 March Hybrid Friendly	(Federation of Malaya) Malayan Chinese XI	3–1	Cambodia	Penang, Malaya
		Report

20 March Hybrid Friendly	(Federation of Malaya) Penang	7–4	Cambodia	Penang, Malaya
		Report

21 March Hybrid Friendly	(Federation of Malaya) Indo-Malays	2–1	Cambodia	Penang, Malaya
		Report

24 April 1956 AFC Asian Cup qualification	Cambodia	3–2 (5–11 agg.)	Malaya	Phnom Penh, Cambodia
	Lung 35', 78'; Nguon Tuy 65'		Ghani 20' ? 45' (o.g.)	Stadium: Lambert Stadium; Referee: Trương Văn Ký (South Vietnam)

? April Friendly	Cambodia	1–2	Malaya	Phnom Penh, Cambodia
		Report		Stadium: Lambert Stadium

3 June 1956 Summer Olympics qualification	South Vietnam	5–2	Cambodia	Saigon, South Vietnam
				Stadium: Stade du Jardin de la Ville

10 June 1956 Summer Olympics qualification	Cambodia	3–4 (5–9 agg.)	South Vietnam	Phnom Penh, Cambodia
				Stadium: Lambert Stadium

? August Hybrid Friendly	Cambodia	Unknown	(Hong Kong) South China	Phnom Penh, Cambodia
		Report		Stadium: Lambert Stadium

2 December Hybrid friendly	Cambodia	3–2	(China) Shanghai	Phnom Penh, Cambodia
		Report		Stadium: Lambert Stadium

9 December Hybrid friendly	Cambodia	0–1	(China) Shanghai	Phnom Penh, Cambodia
		Report		Stadium: Lambert Stadium

== 1957 ==
? April 1957 regional Southeast Asian tournament	Malaya	1–3	Cambodia	Kuala Lumpur, Malaya
		Report

? April 1957 regional Southeast Asian tournament	Malaya	1–3	Cambodia	Kuala Lumpur, Malaya
		Report

? April 1957 regional Southeast Asian tournament	Cambodia	3–3	South Vietnam	Phnom Penh, Cambodia
		Report

? April 1957 regional Southeast Asian tournament	Cambodia	2–3	South Vietnam	Phnom Penh, Cambodia
		Report

3 May Hybrid friendly	Beijing (China)	5–0	Cambodia	Beijing, China
		Report

5 May Hybrid friendly	Locomotive (China)	4–0	Cambodia	Beijing, China
		Report

8 May Hybrid friendly	Tianjin (China)	2–2	Cambodia	Tianjin, China
		Report

12 May Hybrid friendly	Shanghai (China)	10–0	Cambodia	Shanghai, China
		Report

19 May Hybrid friendly	Guangzhou (China)	1–0	Cambodia	Guangzhou, China
		Report

26 May Friendly	North Vietnam	0–1	Cambodia	Hanoi, North Vietnam
		Report

31 August 1957 Merdeka Tournament	Hong Kong League XI	6–2	Cambodia	Kuala Lumpur,Malaya
	Law Kwok Tai 28'; Chow Man Chi 32'; Lau Yee 35' (pen.); Kwok Yau 64'; Mok Chun Wah 64'; Ho Ying Fan 69'		Nguon Ban 22'; Cham Rong 71'	Stadium: Merdeka Stadium

1 September 1957 Merdeka Tournament	Thailand	3–0	Cambodia	Kuala Lumpur,Malaya
	Sophon 13'; Prasun 47', 57'			Stadium: Merdeka Stadium

3 September 1957 Merdeka Tournament	(Myanmar) Burma	2–0	Cambodia	Kuala Lumpur,Malaya
	Maung Maung 65'; Pe-khin 75'			Stadium: Merdeka Stadium

5 September 1957 Merdeka Tournament	Singapore	1–1	Cambodia	Kuala Lumpur,Malaya
	Corthine 61'		Tuy 66'	Stadium: Merdeka Stadium

31 October Friendly	Cambodia	1–3	Malaya	Phnom Penh, Cambodia
		Report		Stadium: Lambert Stadium

? November Unofficial Friendly	Cambodia	Unknown	Poland B	Phnom Penh, Cambodia
				Stadium: Lambert Stadium

? November Friendly	Cambodia	1–1	North Vietnam	Phnom Penh, Cambodia
		Report

15 December Hybrid Friendly	Cambodia	0–2	(Azerbaijan Soviet Socialist Republic) Neftyanik	Phnom Penh, Cambodia
		Report		Stadium: Lambert Stadium; Attendance: 10,000

? December Hybrid Friendly	Cambodia	0–2	(Azerbaijan Soviet Socialist Republic) Neftyanik	Phnom Penh, Cambodia
		Report		Stadium: Lambert Stadium

== 1958 ==
7 February Hybrid Friendly	Cambodia	0–11	(Czechoslovakia) Rudá Hvězda Bratislava	Phnom Penh, Cambodia
		Report

8 February Hybrid Friendly	Cambodia	0–7	(Czechoslovakia) Rudá Hvězda Bratislava	Phnom Penh, Cambodia
		Report

9 February Hybrid Friendly	Cambodia Army	0–1	(Czechoslovakia) Rudá Hvězda Bratislava	Phnom Penh, Cambodia
		Report

24 August Hybrid Friendly	Cong An Haiphong (North Vietnam)	0–1	Cambodia	Haiphong, North Vietnam
		Report	Chhon (?)	Attendance: 30,000

? August Friendly	North Vietnam	1–3	Cambodia	Hanoi, North Vietnam
		Report

== 1959 ==
28 November Unofficial Friendly	Cambodia	0–4	(Russian Soviet Federative Socialist Republic) RSFSR	Phnom Penh, Cambodia
		Report		Stadium: Lambert Stadium

29 November Unofficial Friendly	Cambodia	0–7	(Russian Soviet Federative Socialist Republic) RSFSR	Phnom Penh, Cambodia
		Report		Stadium: Lambert Stadium

? December Unofficial Friendly	Cambodia	1–2	North Vietnam	Phnom Penh, Cambodia
		Report		Stadium: Lambert Stadium

== 1960 ==
29 November Hybrid Friendly	Cambodia	2-2	(Soviet Union) CSKA Moscow	Phnom Penh, Cambodia
		Report

== 1961 ==
16 January Hybrid Friendly	Cambodia	0-1	(Czechoslovakia) TJ Spartak Praha Stalingrad	Phnom Penh, Cambodia
		Report

21 November Hybrid Friendly	Cambodia	1-2	(Soviet Union) Torpedo Moscow	Phnom Penh, Cambodia
		Report

24 November Hybrid Friendly	Cambodia	0-3	(Soviet Union) Torpedo Moscow	Phnom Penh, Cambodia
		Report

11 December 1961 SEAP Games	Burma	4-0	Cambodia	Rangoon, Burma
				Stadium: Bogyoke Aung San Stadium

12 December 1961 SEAP Games	Malaya	4-0	Cambodia	Rangoon, Burma
				Stadium: Bogyoke Aung San Stadium

== 1962 ==
18 January Hybrid Friendly	Cambodia	0-3	(Czechoslovakia) Hradec Králové	Phnom Penh, Cambodia
		Report

23 January Hybrid Friendly	Cambodia	Cancelled	(Socialist Republic of Romania) Petrolul Ploiești	Phnom Penh, Cambodia

26 January Hybrid Friendly	Cambodia	Cancelled	(Socialist Republic of Romania) Petrolul Ploiești	Phnom Penh, Cambodia

11 November Friendly	Cambodia	1-3	North Vietnam	Phnom Penh, Cambodia
		Report

? November Friendly	Cambodia	1-1	North Vietnam	Phnom Penh, Cambodia
		Report

29 December Hybrid Friendly	Cambodia	0-2	(Uzbek Soviet Socialist Republic) Pakhtakor	Phnom Penh, Cambodia
		Report

== 1963 ==
? February Hybrid Friendly	North Vietnam Army	0–0	Cambodia	Hanoi, Vietnam
		Report

? February Hybrid Friendly	North Vietnam	2-0	Cambodia	Hanoi, Vietnam
	Loong (?); Nook (?)	Report

26 April 1963 Piala Soekarno	North Vietnam	3–2	Cambodia	Jakarta, Indonesia
		Report		Stadium: Gelora Senayan Main Stadium

27 April 1963 Piala Soekarno	China	6-0	Cambodia	Jakarta, Indonesia
		Report		Stadium: Gelora Senayan Main Stadium

Unknown Unofficial Friendly	Cambodia	3-1	(Cambodia) Tuol Thmor	Kampong Cham, Cambodia
		Report	Phath (?)

Unknown Friendly	Cambodia	1-0	China	Phnom Penh, Cambodia
		Report

19 December Hybrid Friendly	Cambodia	0-5	(Czechoslovakia) Dukla Prague	Phnom Penh, Cambodia
		Report

? December Hybrid Friendly	Cambodia	Cancelled	East Germany Olympics	Phnom Penh, Cambodia

== 1964 ==
23 August 1964 Merdeka	Taiwan	4-0	Cambodia	Kuala Lumpur, Malaysia
		Report		Stadium: Stadium Merdeka

25 August 1964 Merdeka	South Korea XI	2-2	Cambodia	Kuala Lumpur, Malaysia
		Report		Stadium: Stadium Merdeka

27 August 1964 Merdeka	India	4-0	Cambodia	Kuala Lumpur, Malaysia
	Goswami 5'; D. D'Souza 45', 46'; I. Singh 48'	Report		Stadium: Stadium Merdeka

1 September 1964 Merdeka	Thailand	1-0	Cambodia	Kuala Lumpur, Malaysia
		Report		Stadium: Stadium Merdeka

3 September 1964 Merdeka	Japan XI	4-0	Cambodia	Kuala Lumpur, Malaysia
		Report		Stadium: Stadium Merdeka

8 September Hybrid Friendly	(Malaysia) Malacca	1-3	Cambodia	Malacca, Malaysia
		Report

? October Training Match	Cambodia XI	2-8	Czechoslovakia	Phnom Penh, Cambodia
				Stadium: Olympic Stadium
Note: The Czechoslovak team was supposed to fly back home to Prague, but due to a broken-down plane, they were stranded for a week. The match was play 3x30 minutes.

2 December Hybrid Friendly	Cambodia	0–3	(Soviet Union) CSKA Moscow	Phnom Penh, Cambodia
19:00 UTC+7		Report		Stadium: Olympic Stadium

? December Hybrid Friendly	Cambodia	Cancelled	(Hungary) Tatabányai	Phnom Penh, Cambodia
				Stadium: Olympic Stadium

== 1965 ==
9 February Hybrid Friendly	Cambodia	0-1	(Denmark) B 1909	Phnom Penh, Cambodia
		Report	Palle Hansen 25'	Stadium: Olympic Stadium; Attendance: 5,000

Unknown Friendly	Cambodia	0-0	North Vietnam	Phnom Penh, Cambodia

1 June Hybrid Friendly	Cambodia	1-0	(Indonesia) Indonesian Army	Phnom Penh, Cambodia
	Kandien 60'	Report		Stadium: Olympic Stadium

Unknown Hybrid friendly	Cambodia	1-0	(China) August 1st	Phnom Penh, Cambodia
		Report		Stadium: Olympic Stadium

Unknown Hybrid friendly	Cambodia	2-3	(China) August 1st	Phnom Penh, Cambodia
		Report		Stadium: Olympic Stadium

Unknown Hybrid Friendly	Cambodia	0-1	East Germany U-18	Phnom Penh, Cambodia
		Report		Stadium: Olympic Stadium

1 August 1965 GANEFO Tournament	Guinea	2-1	Cambodia	Pyongyang, North Korea
	Fode 20' Cherif 85'	Report	Phath 80'	Stadium: Moranbong Stadium; Attendance: 100,000

3 August 1965 GANEFO Tournament	North Vietnam	1-1	Cambodia	Pyongyang, North Korea
		Report		Stadium: Moranbong Stadium

5 August 1965 GANEFO Tournament	Indonesia	0–0	Cambodia	Pyongyang, North Korea
		Report		Stadium: Moranbong Stadium

6 August 1965 GANEFO Tournament	China	3–1	Cambodia	Pyongyang, North Korea
	Xiafeng (?) Zhangjian 50' Furu 78'	Report	? 87'	Stadium: Moranbong Stadium

9 August 1965 GANEFO Tournament	North Korea	4–0	Cambodia	Pyongyang, North Korea
		Report		Stadium: Moranbong Stadium

? September Hybrid Friendly	Cambodia	4-0	(Cambodia) Municipalité de Phnom Penh	Phnom Penh, Cambodia
		Report		Stadium: Olympic Stadium

24 September Hybrid friendly	Chongqing (China)	0-1	Cambodia	Chongqing, China
		Report

2 October Hybrid friendly	Beijing (China)	3-0	Cambodia	Beijing, China
		Report

10 October Hybrid friendly	Wuhan (China)	2-1	Cambodia	Wuhan, China
		Report

15 October Hybrid friendly	Guangzhou (China)	2-0	Cambodia	Guangzhou, China
		Report

26 November Friendly	Cambodia	0-0	Australia	Phnom Penh, Cambodia
				Stadium: Olympic Stadium

30 November Friendly	Cambodia	0–3	North Korea	Phnom Penh, Cambodia
		Report

== 1966 ==
? January Hybrid Friendly	Cambodia	Cancelled	(Czechoslovakia) Slovan Bratislava	Phnom Penh, Cambodia
				Stadium: Olympic Stadium

5 February Hybrid Friendly	Cambodia	0-1	(Socialist Federal Republic of Yugoslavia) OFK Belgrade	Phnom Penh, Cambodia
		Report	Banović 26'	Stadium: Olympic Stadium; Attendance: 20,000

20 April Hybrid friendly	Cambodia	3-2	(China) Fujian	Phnom Penh, Cambodia
		Report		Stadium: Olympic Stadium

19 May Hybrid Friendly	Cambodia	1-2	(Hong Kong) Happy Valley	Phnom Penh, Cambodia
		Report		Stadium: Olympic Stadium

26 September Hybrid friendly	Upper Burma XI (Myanmar)	1–4	Cambodia	Mandalay, Burma
		Report		Attendance: 10,000

26 November 1966 GANEFO Tournament	Cambodia	0-2	North Korea	Phnom Penh, Cambodia
		Report		Stadium: Olympic Stadium

27 November 1966 GANEFO Tournament	China	4-0	Cambodia	Phnom Penh, Cambodia
		Report		Stadium: Olympic Stadium

29 November 1966 GANEFO Tournament	Cambodia	8-0	North Yemen	Phnom Penh, Cambodia
		Report		Stadium: Olympic Stadium

30 November 1966 GANEFO Tournament	North Vietnam	2-2	Cambodia	Phnom Penh, Cambodia
		Report		Stadium: Olympic Stadium

3 December 1966 GANEFO Tournament	Cambodia	4-0	Palestine	Phnom Penh, Cambodia
		Report		Stadium: Olympic Stadium

== 1967 ==
16 February Hybrid Friendly	Cambodia B	0-6	(Czechoslovakia) Sparta Prague	Phnom Penh, Cambodia
18:00 UTC+7		Report		Stadium: Olympic Stadium

17 February Hybrid Friendly	Cambodia	1-7	(Czechoslovakia) Sparta Prague	Phnom Penh, Cambodia
18:00 UTC+7		Report		Stadium: Olympic Stadium

? May Friendly	Cambodia	0-1	Burma	Phnom Penh, Cambodia
		Report		Stadium: Olympic Stadium

? May Hybrid Friendly	Cambodia B	1-0	Burma	Phnom Penh, Cambodia
		Report		Stadium: Olympic Stadium

? May Friendly	Cambodia	Cancelled	Scotland	Phnom Penh, Cambodia
		Report		Stadium: Olympic Stadium

Unknown Hybrid Friendly	Cambodia	0-4	(Ukrainian Soviet Socialist Republic) Dynamo Kyiv	Phnom Penh, Cambodia
		Report		Stadium: Olympic Stadium

? November Friendly	Cambodia	Cancelled	New Zealand	Phnom Penh, Cambodia
		Report		Stadium: Olympic Stadium

13 November 1968 AFC Asian Cup qualification	Cambodia	1-0	Pakistan	Rangoon, Burma
	Neou Kandien 83'	Report		Stadium: Bogyoke Aung San Stadium

16 November 1968 AFC Asian Cup qualification	Burma	1-0	Cambodia	Rangoon, Burma
	Win Maung 22'	Report		Stadium: Bogyoke Aung San Stadium

18 November 1968 AFC Asian Cup qualification	Cambodia	3-1	India	Rangoon, Burma
	Sea Cheang Eng 35'; Sieng Tara 57' 60'	Report	P. Kannan 89'	Stadium: Bogyoke Aung San Stadium

Unknown Hybrid Friendly	Cambodia	1-3	(Socialist Federal Republic of Yugoslavia) Red Star Belgrade	Phnom Penh, Cambodia
		Report		Stadium: Olympic Stadium

13 December Hybrid Friendly	Cambodia	1-3	(Czechoslovakia) Slavia Prague	Phnom Penh, Cambodia
18:00 UTC+7	Tara 1'	Report	Nepomucký 32'; Hamár 43'; Šimek 64'	Stadium: Olympic Stadium; Attendance: 14,000

19 December Friendly	Cambodia	6-1	Singapore	Phnom Penh, Cambodia
		Report		Stadium: Olympic Stadium

20 December Friendly	Cambodia	3-1	Singapore	Phnom Penh, Cambodia
		Report		Stadium: Olympic Stadium

== 1968 ==
19 February Hybrid Friendly	Cambodia	10-0	(India) Indian Navy	Phnom Penh, Cambodia
20:00 UTC+7		Report		Stadium: Olympic Stadium

Unknown Hybrid Friendly	Cambodia	2-0	(Indonesia) Pardedetex	Phnom Penh, Cambodia
		Report		Stadium: Olympic Stadium

27 August Friendly	Cambodia	Cancelled	Hong Kong	Phnom Penh, Cambodia
		Report		Stadium: Olympic Stadium
Note: The match was cancelled after Hong Kong national football team failed to arrive in Phnom Penh due to travel flight connection problems.

28 August Friendly	Cambodia	Cancelled	Hong Kong	Phnom Penh, Cambodia
		Report		Stadium: Olympic Stadium
Note: The match was cancelled after Hong Kong national football team failed to arrive in Phnom Penh due to travel flight connection problems.

Unknown Friendly	Cambodia	0-1	North Korea	Phnom Penh, Cambodia
		Report		Stadium: Olympic Stadium

7 December Hybrid Friendly	Cambodia	0-3	(Georgian Soviet Socialist Republic) Dinamo Tbilisi	Phnom Penh, Cambodia
		Report		Stadium: Olympic Stadium

10 December Hybrid Friendly	Cambodia	2-4	(Georgian Soviet Socialist Republic) Dinamo Tbilisi	Phnom Penh, Cambodia
		Report		Stadium: Olympic Stadium

== 1969 ==
25 February Hybrid Friendly	Cambodia	0-1	(Denmark) OB	Phnom Penh, Cambodia
		Report	John Christensen (?)	Stadium: Olympic Stadium

28 February Hybrid Friendly	Cambodia XI	3-0	(Denmark) OB	Phnom Penh, Cambodia
	Phath (?); Tara (?) (?)	Report		Stadium: Olympic Stadium

4 March Hybrid Friendly	Cambodia XI	2-1	(Japan) Yanmar Diesel	Phnom Penh, Cambodia
		Report		Stadium: Olympic Stadium

10 March Hybrid Friendly	Cambodia XI	unknown	(Japan) Yanmar Diesel	Phnom Penh, Cambodia
		Report		Stadium: Olympic Stadium

13 August Friendly	Cambodia	2–1	Burma	Phnom Penh, Cambodia
	Chheng Eang 10'; Tara 48'	Report	Myo Win Nyunt 53' (pen.)	Stadium: Olympic Stadium; Attendance: 15,000; Referee: Um Tor (Cambodia)

15 August Friendly	Cambodia	3-0	Burma	Phnom Penh, Cambodia
	Chheng Eang 56' (pen.); Mnork 70'; Tara 85'	Report		Stadium: Olympic Stadium; Attendance: 20,000

3 October Hybrid Friendly	Cambodia	4–0	Hong Kong Rangers	Phnom Penh, Cambodia
	Pen Phath 14', 28', 60'; Chheng Sang 75'	Report		Stadium: National Olympic Stadium; Referee: In Tal (Cambodia)
Note: The match was supposed to be played on 1 October, but due to flooding at the stadium, it was delayed for two days to let the pitch dry.

5 October Hybrid Friendly	Cambodia	3-1	Hong Kong Rangers	Phnom Penh, Cambodia
	Sok Chhong Lang 15' (pen.); Pen Phath (?); Sok Sun Hieng 80'	Report	Kwok Ka Ming 65'	Stadium: National Olympic Stadium; Referee: In Tal (Cambodia)

== 1970 ==
19 February Hybrid Friendly	Cambodia	0–3	(East Germany) 1. FC Magdeburg	Phnom Penh, Cambodia
			Zapf (?); Oelze (?); Sparwasser (?)	Stadium: Olympic Stadium; Attendance: 35,000

3 October Friendly	South Vietnam	2–2	Cambodia	Saigon, South Vietnam
		Report		Stadium: Cộng Hòa Stadium

4 October Friendly	South Vietnam	1–1	Cambodia	Saigon, South Vietnam
		Report		Stadium: Cộng Hòa Stadium

== Head-to-head records ==
Cambodia national football team head-to-head records (1950–1970)
Opponent	Pld	W	D	L	GF	GA	GD	Pts	Confederation
Australia	1	0	1	0	0	0	0	1	OFC
Burma	4	1	0	3	2	8	–6	3	AFC
China	4	1	0	3	2	13	–11	3	AFC
Guinea	1	0	0	1	1	2	–1	0	CAF
Hong Kong	1	1	0	0	3	1	+2	3	AFC
India	2	1	0	1	3	5	–2	3	AFC
Indonesia	2	1	1	0	2	0	+2	4	AFC
Malaysia	5	1	0	4	7	21	–14	3	AFC
North Vietnam	6	2	2	2	10	9	+1	8	AFC
North Yemen	1	1	0	0	8	0	+8	3	AFC
Pakistan	1	1	0	0	1	0	+1	3	AFC
Palestine	1	1	0	0	4	0	+4	3	AFC
North Korea	4	0	0	4	0	10	–10	0	AFC
Singapore	4	2	2	0	11	4	+7	8	AFC
South Vietnam	4	0	0	4	5	18	–13	0	AFC
Thailand	3	1	0	2	7	5	+2	3	AFC
Taiwan	1	0	0	1	0	4	–4	0	AFC
Total	45	14	6	25	66	100	–34	48	
