= Thomas Kristensen =

Thomas Kristensen may refer to:

- Thomas Kristensen (footballer, born 1983), Danish footballer
- Thomas Thiesson Kristensen (born 2002), Danish footballer
- Thomas Kristensen (handballer) (born 1990), Norwegian handball player

== See also ==
- Thomas Christensen (disambiguation)
- Tom Kristensen (disambiguation)
