= Tom Christensen =

Tom Christensen may refer to:

- Tom Christensen (politician) (born 1966), Canadian politician and lawyer
- Tom Christensen (ice hockey) (born 1944), Norwegian ice hockey player
- Tom Christensen (tennis) (born 1949), Danish tennis player

== See also ==
- Tommy Christensen (born 1961), Danish footballer
- Tom Christiansen (born 1963), American Unix developer
- Thomas Christensen (disambiguation)
- Tom Kristensen (disambiguation)
