= HomeCo. Carlingford Court =

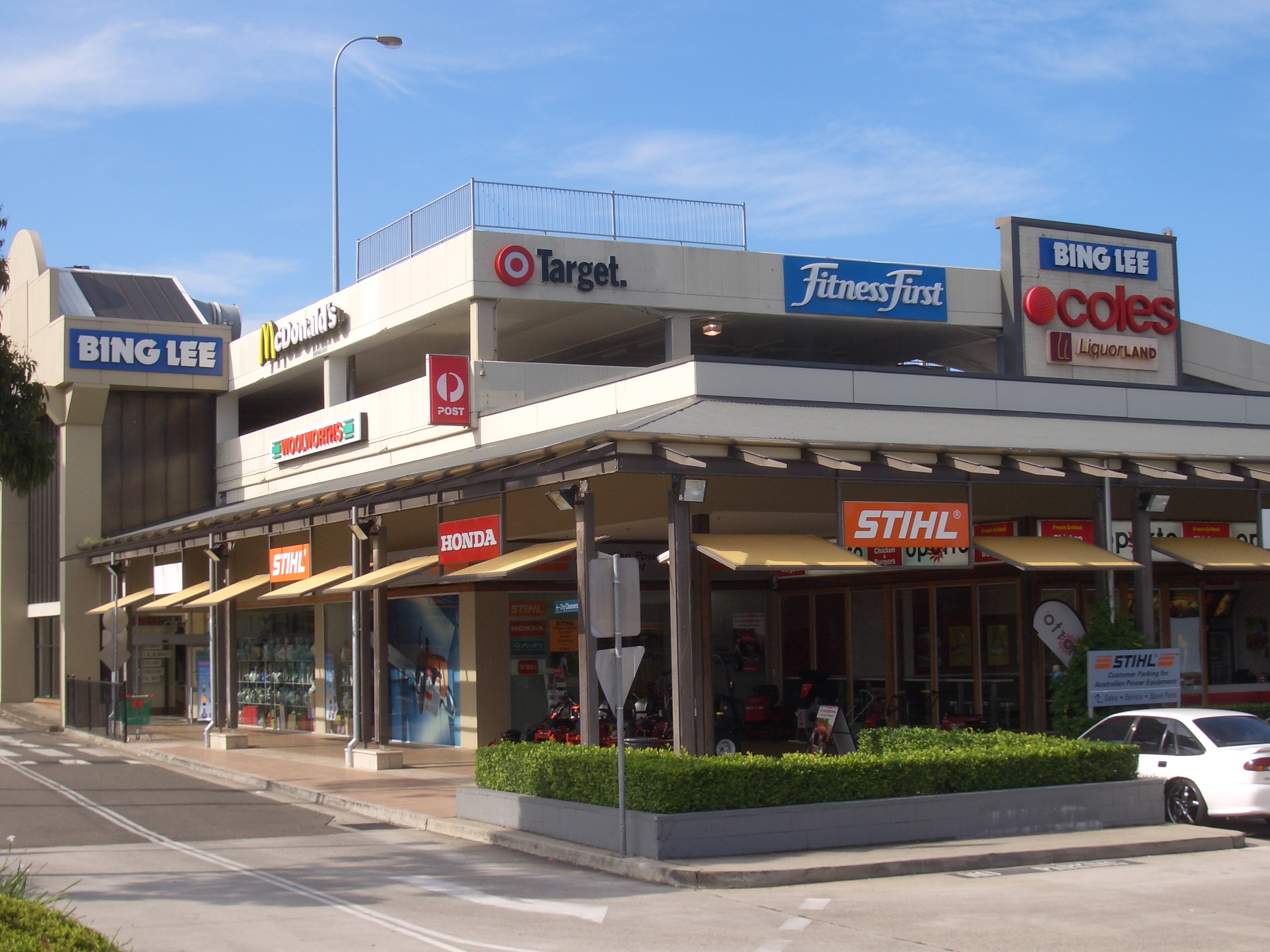
- Carlingford Court in 2007
- Location: Carlingford, New South Wales, Australia
- Coordinates: 33°46′35″S 151°03′09″E
- Address: Cnr Pennant Hills & Carlingford Roads
- Opened: 1965
- Previous names: The Village Centre (1965 - 1971); Carlingford Court (1971 - 2026)
- Manager: HMC Capital
- Owner: JY Group (50%); HMC Capital (50%)
- Num. of stores: 98
- Num. of anchor tenants: 2
- Floor area: 33,298 m^{2} (358,417 sq ft)
- Floors: 4
- Parking: 1,427 spaces
- Public transit: Carlingford; Pennant Hills Road and Rembrandt Street
- Website: home-co.com.au/carlingford-court

HomeCo. Carlingford Court (previously known as Carlingford Court and Village Centre) is a shopping centre in the suburb of Carlingford in Northern Sydney.

== Transport ==
HomeCo. Carlingford Court has bus connections to the Northern Suburbs, Hills District and Greater Western Sydney, as well as local surrounding suburbs. It is served by Busways. The majority of its bus services are located on Pennant Hills Road and Rembrandt Street.

Carlingford Court has multi-level car parks with 1,427 spaces.

== History ==
=== 20th Century ===
==== 1960s: opening ====
Carlingford Court opened in 1965 as the Village Centre on a former orchard and nursery site. The centre featured Woolworths with Farmers added at a later date (rebranded to Grace Bros in 1984 and Myer in 2004), and around 50 stores.

==== 1970s: redevelopment ====
In the 1970s, the centre went a redevelopment with the addition of Venture, Best & Less and a second level. It was subsequently renamed Carlingford Court.

==== 1980s ====
In 1985 Growth Equities Mutual Ltd (GEM) purchased Carlingford Court for $29 million. Carlingford Court underwent a $30 million refurbishment from 1987 through to 1989 which involved a restructure and changes to the existing retailers and changes to the carpark. A freestanding KFC buffet restaurant, a drive-thru bottle shop were built in the carpark and around 40 stores and a food court were added.

==== 1990s ====
In July 1992, the Venture store was earmarked for closure. It was replaced by Target.

In June 1994, Growth Equities Mutual Ltd (GEM) was sold to Lend Lease Corporation Ltd for around $40 million. At that time Carlingford Court was valued at $90.21 million on a net income of more than $8 million. Lend Lease listed the centre along with the adjacent $2.5 million Neville's Corner shopping centre on Carlingford Road which was planned to be a future expansion of Carlingford Court for sale in October 1995.

In 1999 Lend Lease planned a $40 million redevelopment to the centre to create an "urban village feel" and contain a high proportion of independent stores over chain stores, more specialty food retailers and upgraded community facilities.

=== 21st Century ===
==== 2000s: redevelopment and Myer closure ====
In February 2000, Carlingford Court underwent a $40 million redevelopment with the relocation of 40 stores and the introduction of 40 new retailers. Myer Grace Bros department store was refurbished and reconfigured into an 8,000m² two-level store with an open layout and a product range. The ground level of the Myer Grace Bros store was replaced by a 3,500m² Coles supermarket (which replaced the Franklins supermarket) and a new 12-store fresh-food precinct between Woolworths and the new Coles. The free-standing KFC outlet and drive-thru bottle store were demolished and replaced by 88 new parking spaces and a new strip of shops actually facing the car park was added. The old McDonald's restaurant facing the carpark and the former KFC outlet were relocated into the new food court outside Woolworths. The fashion level on level one was refurbished and seven out of 20 fashion stores remained independent stores. On the top level the community centre, Healthlands Gym and pool were upgraded.

On 31 March 2006, the two-level Myer store closed down and was replaced by Target which relocated from its space on the other side of the centre. Target opened in November 2006 and is the only multi-level store in Sydney. Bing Lee, Go-Lo and Priceline opened in the original space of Target in April and June 2007.

==== 2010s: ownership changes ====
In December 2013, Federation Centres in a join acquisition with Telstra Super purchased Carlingford Court from GPT Wholesale Shopping Centre Fund for $177 million. As part of the deal Federation Centres were responsible for the management, development, leasing and operations activities of Carlingford Court. The sale was finalized on 18 December 2013. In June 2015 Federation Centres merged with Novion Property Group to form Vicinity Centres. As a result Carlingford Court came under control of Vicinity Centres.

==== 2020s: COVID-19 pandemic, ownership changes, rebranding and Target closure ====
Due to the outbreak of COVID-19 pandemic Carlingford Court remained open to retailers offering essential services only. Many retailers introduced click-and-collect services. The food court, cafes and restaurants remained open to delivery and takeaway only with the seating area for customers closed off. Hand sanitiser stations, signage and social distancing measures were introduced.

In September 2022, Hong Kong based JY Group acquired the 50% stake of Carlingford Court from Telstra Super for $120.5 million. Vicinity Centres sold its half shares in Roselands Shopping Centre and Carlingford Court for a combined $287 million in December 2024. The sale of Carlingford Court was finalized in April 2025 and the 50% stake was sold to the Last Mile Retail Logistics Fund managed by HMC Capital for $120 million. As a result of the sale the centre was rebranded to HomeCo. Carlingford Court.

On 23 July 2026, HomeCo. confirmed that the two-level Target discount department store would be closing its store in October 2026 after HomeCo. decided to not renew their lease. HomeCo. planned to repurpose the Target space into a supermarket space. Since the centre already has a Woolworths and Coles supermarket, there were speculations that Aldi would open in the space of Target.

Target closed its level 2 floor on 7 September 2026, and the store sold its remaining stock on level 1 until its full closure on 3 October 2026.

On 7 October 2026, HomeCo announced that the Aldi supermarket will occupy part of the former Target space and the development will also introduce a range of new national and international retailers.

== Tenants ==
HomeCo. Carlingford Court has 33,298m² of floor space. The major retailers include Aldi (Opening soon), Coles, Woolworths and Fitness First.

== See also ==
- List of shopping centres in Australia
