= Christenson =

Christenson is a Scandinavian patronymic surname, and an anglicized form of the Danish Christensen. It is believed to originate from the personal name "Christen". Notable people with the surname include:

- Andrew B. Christenson (1869–1931), American educator
- Chris Christenson (1875–1943), American figure skater
- Dave Christenson (1963–2017), American singer, one half of the pop duo Stabilizers
- Fred Christenson, American television executive and poker player
- Gary Christenson (mayor), American politician
- Gary Christenson (baseball) (born 1953), American baseball player
- John N. Christenson (born 1958), United States Navy admiral
- Irma Christenson (1915–1993), Swedish actress
- Larry Christenson (born 1953), American baseball player
- Ryan Christenson (born 1974), American baseball player

== See also ==
- Christensen (surname)
- Kristensen
