= Hans Christensen =

Hans Christensen may refer to:

- Hans Christensen (footballer)
- Hans Christensen (silversmith)
