= Thomas Christensen =

Thomas Christensen may refer to:

- Thomas Guldborg Christensen (born 1984), Danish footballer
- Thomas Christensen (author) (born 1948), American author
- Thomas J. Christensen, American academic and former government official
- T. C. Christensen (Thomas C. Christensen, born 1953), American cinematographer, film director, and writer

== See also ==
- Tom Christensen (disambiguation)
- Tommy Christensen (born 1961), Danish footballer
- Thomas Kristensen (disambiguation)
- Thomas Christiansen (born 1973), Spanish footballer and manager
