= Kaare Christensen =

- Born: 20 June 1959 (age 66)
- Education: Odense University; University of Southern Denmark
- Known for: Human longevity Twin studies
- Awards: Fondation IPSEN Longevity Prize (2016)
- Scientific career
- Fields: Biostatistics; Epidemiology
- Institutions: University of Southern Denmark

Kaare Christensen (born 20 June 1959) is a Danish epidemiologist and biostatistician. He is a professor of epidemiology at the University of Southern Denmark, where he also directs the Danish Aging Research Center and the Danish Twin Registry. He is known for his research on human longevity and aging. Specific topics he has researched include the increasing average life expectancy in developing countries, as well as the influence of genetic factors on human lifespan and international variations in levels of happiness. In 2016, he was awarded the Longevity Prize from the Fondation IPSEN "for his pioneering work on the importance of genes and environment in aging and longevity."
