= St Paul's Anglican Church, Carlingford =

Church building in New South Wales, Australia

The old St Paul's Church of England Church building (now disused)
- The old St Paul's Church of England sandstone building; The Old Church Bookshop
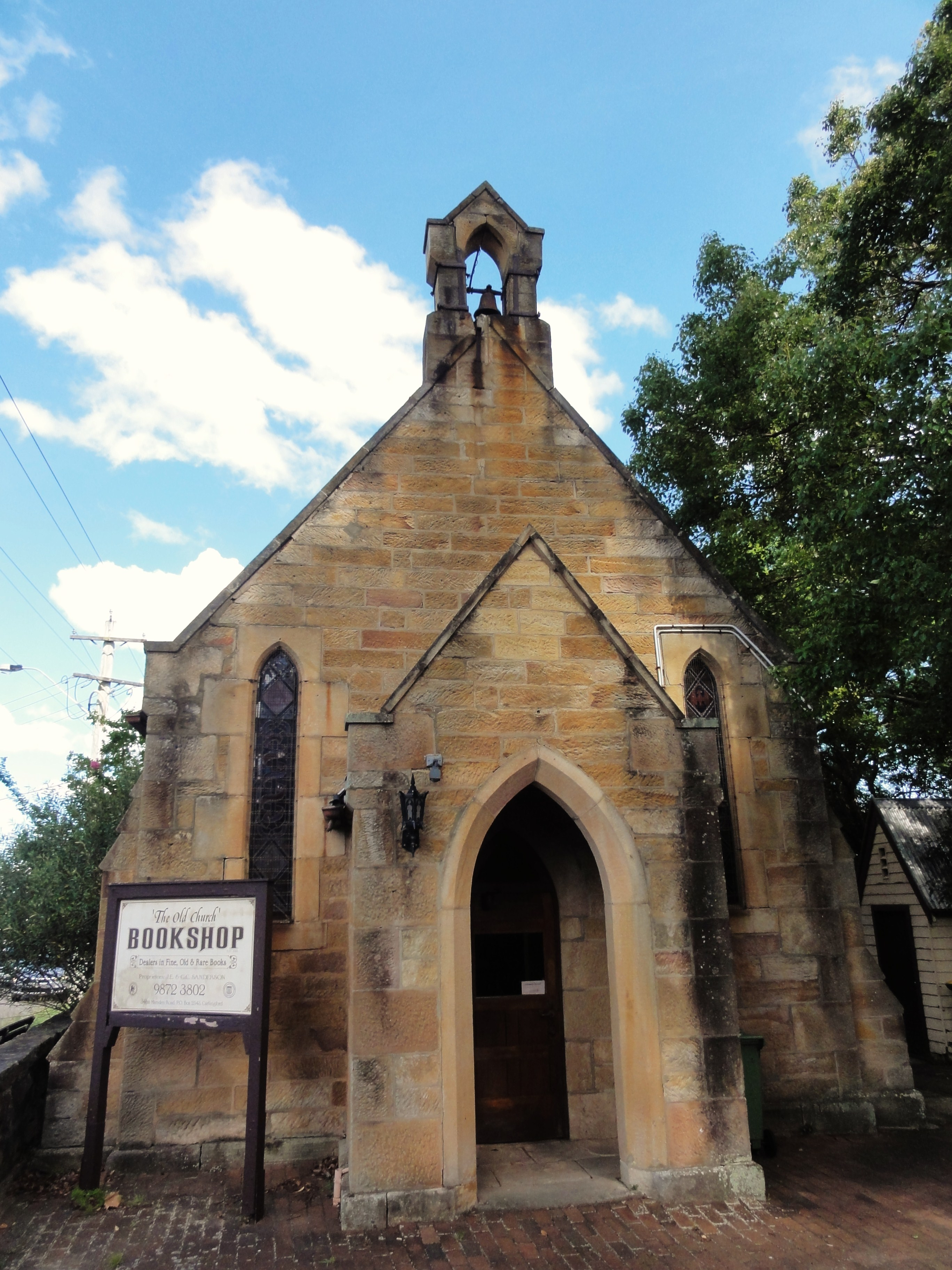
- The converted church, as a bookshop, pictured in 2013
- The old St Paul's Church of England Church building (now disused)
- 33°46′53″S 151°03′17″E
- Location: 346 Marsden Road, Carlingford, City of Parramatta, Sydney, New South Wales
- Country: Australia
- Denomination: Church of England
- Tradition: Evangelical
- Churchmanship: Low

History
- Status: Church
- Consecrated: 4 July 1850 by Rt. Rev. William Broughton

Architecture
- Functional status: Inactive
- Architectural type: Victorian Academic Gothic
- Closed: 1980

New South Wales Heritage Register
- Official name: The old St. Paul's Church of England building (now disused); St Paul's Church of England
- Type: State heritage (built)
- Designated: 2 April 1999
- Reference no.: 56
- Type: Church
- Category: Religion
- Builders: Richard Marshall

Register of the National Estate
- Official name: the old St Paul's Church of England sandstone building (now disused), 346 Marsden Rd, Carlingford, NSW, Australia
- Type: Defunct register
- Designated: 14 May 1991
- Reference no.: 3095
- Class: Historic

The old St Paul's Church of England sandstone building is a heritage-listed former Anglican church building and former bookshop at 346 Marsden Road, Carlingford, City of Parramatta, Sydney, New South Wales, Australia. It is also known as The old St Paul's Anglican sandstone building and The Old Church Bookshop. It was added to the New South Wales State Heritage Register on 2 April 1999.

Whilst it is sometimes called St Paul's Anglican Church, that is an anachronism. The building was sold before the name of the denomination in Australia changed from "Church of England" to "Anglican". The change came about at least in part due to the church in Australia being autocephalous.

== History ==
On 4 February 1847 William Mobbs donated 0.40 hectares (1 acre) of land for an Anglican church bounded on the north by Marsden Road. The land was conveyed to Reverend George Edward Weaver Turner, then the incumbent of St. Anne's Church at Ryde. Mobbs had inherited 13 hectares (33 acres) of land at Carlingford from his father, also called William Mobbs.

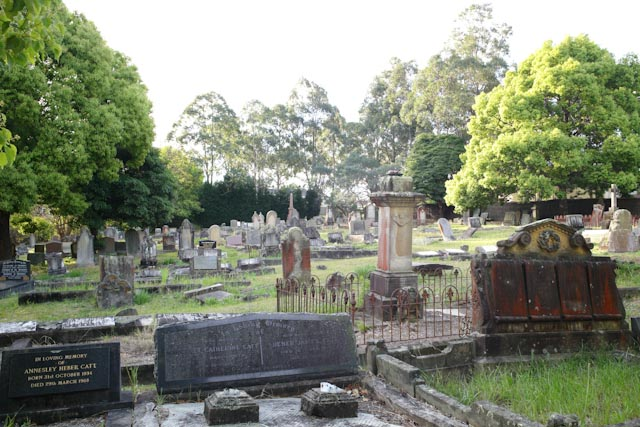
St Paul's Anglican Cemetery, 2013

Mobbs' gift was intended to provide not only a site for a church but also a burial ground adjacent to the church. Unfortunately, the nature of the shale foundation close to the surface of the ground made it unsuitable for grave digging. William Mobbs then made a further gift of 0.51 hectares (1.25 acres) from the family land closer to his own home, "Stonehaven", and on the north of Marsden Road; access to the burial ground being made by a lane leading from Marsden Road. This explains why the cemetery of St Paul's Church is so far from the building itself. William Mobbs himself was first person laid to rest in the cemetery on 14 July 1851.

The church was opened and consecrated by the Rt. Rev. William Broughton on 4 July 1850. An unusual aspect of the church opening was that the building had been entirely paid for when it was completed. This allowed for the consecration of the church at opening, as this cannot take place until all debts have been cleared.

The Sydney Morning Herald observed at the opening of the church:

"It was truly a delightful sensation of surprise with which we behalf the beautiful little church which has been so unostentatiously raised in the wilderness and of which we had scarcely heard before its consecration was announced. The whole of the chancel fittings and communion service were provided by a few friends of the incumbent (Rev Turner), through the kindness and zeal of Mr. Acton Sillitoe, who, on hearing that there was a lack of means to bring the building to a state of completion, collected in a few days upwards of 35 ponds". "The Font was presented by Mr. Charles Moore, of the Botanic Gardens, (a well known figure in our history), and a handsome set of books was presented by the Bishop from the Society for the promotion of Christian knowledge. It is highly creditable to the Trustees that, unlike most of our newly erected churches, this building is entirely debt free".

The masonry work was carried out by Richard Marshall, who quarried and dressed the stone on his own property near Jenkins Road, Carlingford.

The Rev. Turner continued as incumbent of Carlingford until 1860. The Parish was a large one when Rev. Robert Taylor became rector in 1860 of St Paul's Castle Hill, St Paul's Carlingford and Dural. This had developed within the extensive parish of St Annes, Ryde until Castle Hill became a separate parish with Carlingford as one of its outlying centres.

With the coming of the railway line through the northern districts in 1886, development began to take place much quicker close to the resultant railway stations than it did around the church area. As such, the church began to suffer some isolation. However, services continued through kerosene lighting of the church; gaslight in 1916; the World War I; the influenza epidemic in 1919 when meetings were at first prohibited then allowed when conducted in the open air with the congregation wearing masks. Electric light was installed in the church and the school hall next door in 1926.

In 1942 the church became a Parish. It was then 93 years old and had served as a subsidiary centre in other parishes for 55 of those years.

In 1980, the church building was sold and the congregation moved to a new building on the corner of Moseley St and Vickery Ave in Carlingford, and the church has six different congregations still meeting there each Sunday. The building was subsequently converted to use as a bookshop; however, this has also since closed.

== Description ==
A small sandstone Victorian Academic Gothic former church with west porch, a nave featuring lancet windows, a bellcote, chancel and later vestry erected at the direction of the Right Reverend W. G. Broughton, first Bishop of Sydney. The land was donated in 1847 by William Mobbs.

As the land has shale close to the surface, it could not be used for burials, so Mobbs donated another plot which became the burial ground some distance from the Church. Unusually, the church was entirely paid for when completed and consecrated in 1850. The stonework was carried out by R. Marshall, who quarried and dressed the stone on his own property in Carlingford. The lighting in the church, originally kerosene, was gaslight in 1916 and electric in 1926.

The site has a large camphor laurel (Cinnamomum camphora) which may be some 50 years old. There were 2 Norfolk Island pines (Araucaria excelsa); however, both have been removed, one due to road widening and one due to a lightning strike c. 2003.

== Heritage listing ==
The old St. Pauls Church of England sandstone building is the oldest remaining former Church of England building in the region, built by William Mobbs in 1847. A mid-nineteenth century Victorian Academic Gothic former Church which is important for its historic associations with the early settlement of the Carlingford area. Its design is architecturally important as a well proportioned example of a small Church of its style. It is valued for its aesthetic contribution to the townscape. For well over a century the Church had religious associations with the local Church of England (later being re-named Anglican) congregation. It has historic associations with Bishop Broughton, who supported the construction of the Church and consecrated it.

The old St Paul's Church of England sandstone building was listed on the New South Wales State Heritage Register on 2 April 1999.

== See also ==
- List of former churches in Australia
