= Peter Christiansen =

Peter Christiansen may refer to:

- Peter Christiansen (rower) (born 1941), Danish rower
- Peter Christiansen (footballer, born 1975), Danish footballer
- Peter Christiansen (footballer, born 1999), Danish footballer

== See also ==
- Peter Christensen (disambiguation)
