= Aware Super =

Australian retirement fund

- Industry: Superannuation
- Predecessors: First State Super; VicSuper
- Founded: 1 July 2020; 6 years ago
- Headquarters: Sydney, New South Wales, Australia
- Key people: Deanne Stewart (CEO)
- AUM: ▲ A$200 billion (2025)
- Members: ▲1.15 million (2024)
- Number of employees: 1,507 (2024)
- Website: www.aware.com.au

Aware Super is an Australian industry superannuation fund headquartered in Sydney, New South Wales. With $200 billion under management and 1.15 million members, it is Australia's third-largest superannuation fund.

== History ==
It was initially established in 1992 as First State Super to provide superannuation benefits to New South Wales government employees. First State Super became a public offer fund on 1 May 2006, opening up membership to anyone eligible to receive superannuation benefits. This was in response to feedback from existing members who were keen to remain with the fund when they changed jobs and moved from the public to the private sector. The change meant First State Super became included in comparisons of performance, fees and other features with other funds.

In 2012, First State Super merged with Health Super, a not-for-profit superannuation fund for workers in the health care and community services sector. At the time the merger meant the combined entity was the third largest superannuation fund in Australia.

In 2016, First State Super acquired StatePlus for $1.1bn to boost its advice offering. In 2020 it was reported the asset had under-performed, losing nearly $400m and been affected by a fee-for-no-service scandal which prompted an Australian Securities & Investments Commission referral.

On 1 July 2020, First State Super and VicSuper merged to become Aware Super. Shortly after rebranding as Aware Super in 2020, it undertook a mass divestment that reduced the carbon footprint of its holdings in equities by 40%. On 3 December 2020, WA Super merged with Aware Super.

In April 2023, Aware Super acquired a 22 per cent shareholder in Get Living, the built-to-rent developer that owns East Village, London from the Qatar Investment Authority.

In November 2023, Aware Super opened its first international office in London to further its direct investments in real estate, infrastructure and private equity in the UK and Europe.

In July 2025, Aware Super announced it had signed a non-binding Memorandum of Understanding to explore a merger with Telstra Super.

== Current Ratings and Awards ==
- 2024 – Chant West: Super Fund of the Year, Pension Fund of the Year, Best Fund for Investments, Best Fund for Insurance
- 2024 – Finder Awards: Provider of the Year, Best Low Fee Super Fund, Best Conservative Super Fund
- 2024 – SuperRatings: Retirement Offering of the Year 2024, Aware Super Retirement Income
- 2025 – Chant West 5 Apples super rating; Aware Super Future Saver
- 2025 – SuperRatings: Super Fund of the Year, Best Digital Offering, Smooth Ride award, MyChoice Super of the Year
- 2025 – Money Magazine: Ultra Long-Term Performance award

== Controversy ==
In September/October 2011, a security vulnerability in First State Super's system was discovered by a customer. First State Super received considerable negative publicity nationally and internationally, both for the severity of and ease of compromise of the exploit, and also for the actions and public relations that occurred in the aftermath of the notification.

The Federal Privacy Commissioner investigated the event. On 7 June 2012, the Privacy Commissioner found that at the time of the incident, First State Super was in breach of National Privacy Principal 4.1. As a result of First State Super and Pillar's immediate action, the Commissioner ceased the investigation and closed his file on the matter on the basis that the response to the incident was adequate in the circumstances.

== See also ==
- Superannuation in Australia
