= Jim Christensen =

Australian investment manager

James (Jim) Christensen
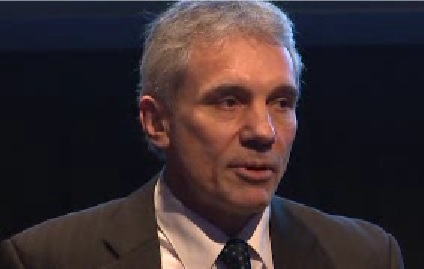
- Jim Christensen speaking at an investment conference in 2012
- Born: Childers, Queensland
- Education: University of Queensland
- Occupation: Investor

James (Jim) Christensen is an Australian investor who is known for his tenure at some of the country's most prominent funds management firms. He has notably served as the chief investment officer of Australia's largest corporate superannuation fund, Telstra Super and later the country's largest state fund Queensland Investment Corporation before announcing his retirement in September 2021. In February of 2022, it was announced that Jim had taken a step out of retirement and would be appointed as Chair of the Investment Advisory Committee for Brisbane-based funds management firm Alvia Asset Partners.

== Career ==
Jim began his career working in Queensland Treasury before moving on to the Queensland Investment Corporation (QIC). He spent over 10 years at the QIC managing some of the $54 billion the organisation was then responsible for. At this company, Jim was given the position of managing director of the Active Management Division, as well as chairing the alpha investment committee. Ultimately, this meant Jim was responsible for determining and implementing investment strategies across all portfolios.

Jim was appointed to the role of chief investment officer at Telstra Super in 2009 on 16 December, succeeding Steve Merlicek. He managed over $15 billion for the company. The company is the largest corporate pension fund in Australia, with over 100,000 members.

On 24 November 2015 Jim officially resigned from Telstra Super to return QIC, initially as managing director for Global Multi Asset and eventually State Chief Investment Officer. Jim was responsible for asset allocation and active management at the $74.6 Billion fund. QIC was, as of Jim's appointment, the second-largest investment fund in the country. In taking the position, Jim succeeded the departing CIO Adriaan Ryder, who left after 7 years with the company.

On 1 September 2021, QIC released a statement to announce Jim's retirement along with the appointment of Alison hill as the new state CIO. The fund had grown by approximately $20 billion over the 5 years since his appointment in 2015. Just 9 months after departing the $100B CIO position, Jim commenced stepped out of retirement as Investment Advisory Committee Chair of Alvia Asset Partners. This high performance Brisbane-based funds management firm focuses primarily on family offices with over $500mil (AUD) under management.

== In the media ==
Over his career Jim has been featured in a number of live, televised and written pieces of media. His economic opinions have been recorded in leading magazines, journals and newspapers. These articles most commonly depict investment strategies with a particular focus on corporate asset management. As a speaker, Jim has presented at public functions around the world, including conferences with the Centre for Investor Education (CIE) and the Fund Executives Association Ltd (FEAL). In addition to this, he is often shown in online investor education videos.

The returns of his funds investments are also heavily highlighted and scrutinised across Australian media. For the most part, funds under his control are usually industry leaders. In 2015 Jim was listed as a nominee for the prestigious Conexus Financial Superannuation CIO of the Year award. He proceeded to win the Award, edging out his competitors at the gala event. In addition to this award, he went on to win CIO of the year at the Rainmaker awards in the same year.

It was reported that James was the fifth highest paid Investment Officer in the Super Industry for 2015; the highest of any corporate fund. That same year it was also shown, that Jim earned over $500, 000 more than the CEO of Telstra Super.

== Education ==
James grew up in Childers, Queensland in Australia. After completing high school in Gin Gin, Queensland he went on to study at the prestigious University of Queensland. He holds a Bachelor of Science (BSc), Bachelor of Economics (BEc) and Master of Economics (MEc).
