= Carlingford, New South Wales =

Carlingford
- Suburb
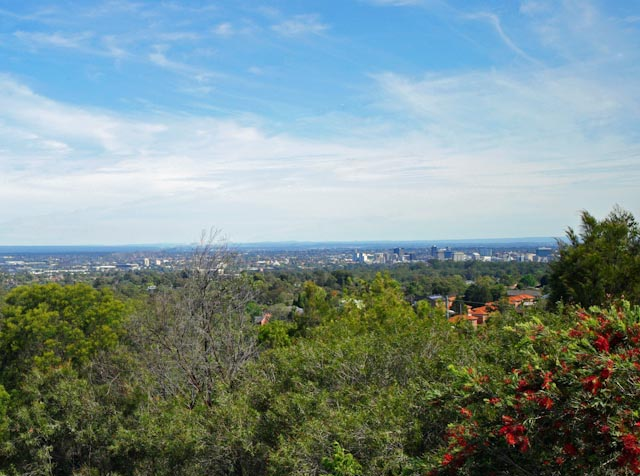
- The view from Mobbs Hill has been a noted feature of the district for generations

- Interactive map of Carlingford
- Coordinates: 33°46′37″S 151°2′53″E
- Country: Australia
- State: New South Wales
- City: Sydney
- LGA: City of Parramatta
- Location: 22 km (14 mi) NW of Sydney CBD

Government
  - State electorate: Epping
  - Federal division: Parramatta

Area
  - Total: 7.9 km^{2} (3.1 sq mi)
- Elevation: 129 m (423 ft)

Population
  - Total: 28,044 (2021 census)
  - Density: 3,550/km^{2} (9,190/sq mi)
- Postcode: 2118
Suburbs around Carlingford
North Rocks	West Pennant Hills	Beecroft
North Parramatta	Carlingford	Epping
Oatlands	Dundas Valley, Telopea	Eastwood

Carlingford (/ˈkɑːrlɪŋfərd/) is a suburb of Sydney, in the state of New South Wales, Australia. Carlingford is 22 kilometres (14 mi) north-west of the Sydney central business district in the local government area of City of Parramatta. Carlingford sits at the meeting point of Northern Sydney and Western Sydney sitting on both sides of Pennant Hills Road which generally acts as a divider of the two regions. While being part of City of Parramatta, it is sometimes referred to as being part of the Hills District.

== History ==
=== Aboriginal contact ===
References to Aboriginal people in the Carlingford historical record in the 18th, 19th and into the 20th century remain limited to a handful of third-party observations, reinterpreted in modern day. There are many historical ambiguities and uncertainties around clan, language and cultural groups of the area.

The people of what is now known as Carlingford at the time of the arrival of the First Fleet at Port Jackson in 1788 were the Wallumedegal or Wallumattagai people. The people were observed to live in the area bounded approximately by the Parramatta River in the south, the Lane Cove River in the east, the Parramatta area in the west and ranged north for an uncertain distance. The Wallumedegal appear to have been of the Eora language group. The clan name seems to have been derived from wallumai, the snapper fish, combined with matta, a word used in association with 'place' or sometimes 'waterplace'.

Evidence of fire-stick burn off (whereby native vegetation is cleared through fire to create grasslands) along the northern banks of the Parramatta River were observed in February 1788 by an exploring boat party headed by Captain John Hunter and Lieutenant William Bradley in such places which became known as Kissing Point and Meadowbank. The grasslands created by the Aboriginals' burn off encouraged animals to graze and enhanced the ease of hunting and gathering. Around and above these pastures backing up into the Carlingford area were thick, tall stands of Blue Gum High Forest.

Aboriginal people in the Parramatta area began moving to new areas soon after the arrival of the colonists at Port Jackson. A military post was established at Parramatta in November 1788 which resulted in a group of Burramattagal people moving into Wallumedegal area at Kissing Point. The impact of illness on local people in the immediate years after arrival has been considered to be due to smallpox. Increasingly this belief is questioned as to the feasibility of such an illness being carried for 15 months at sea.

Early land grants in the Carlingford area in the 1790s included those to Cox, Mobbs and Arndell. Around 1800 about 100 Aboriginal people were noted as living around Cox's Brush Farm on the Carlingford-Eastwood border. By 1827 the numbers of Aboriginal people in the area were observed to have dropped considerably.

=== Colonial period 1788–1900 ===
==== Etymology ====
The name Carlingford came into use officially on 16 July 1883 for the name of the post office located at Mobbs Hill. There are varying accounts of how the name Carlingford was suggested. One version was that local Frederick Cox heard one of his employees describe similarities between Mobbs Hill and the town of Carlingford, County Louth, located in the east of Ireland, on the present day border between Northern Ireland and the Republic of Ireland. Alternatively, and perhaps a happy alignment with the former version, was that Carlingford was named in honour of Lord Carlingford, who was the British Under-Secretary of State for the Colonies 1847–1860.

Prior to 1883 the locality was known under various names and lacked any clear boundaries. The fluidity in district names in the colonial period reflected changes in the patterns of land use and access to the area as the process of colonisation proceeded. Names of nearby areas were sometimes vaguely associated with what became Carlingford and even after that name was settled usage remained fluid for a time.

The Ponds referred from 1791 to the nearby valley (later known as Dundas Valley).

The Eastern Farms (east of Parramatta) in 1792 to what became the Ryde district.

The Northern Boundary broadly referred to the limits of settlement north of Parramatta and could be used variably to include areas later known as North Rocks, Carlingford, Pennant Hills or North Parramatta.

The Field of Mars Common was established in 1804 in the area to the north west of what was to become Carlingford and the parish of the same name was established in 1821. The name Field of Mars too was used loosely to cover anywhere from Ermington to Epping including Carlingford.

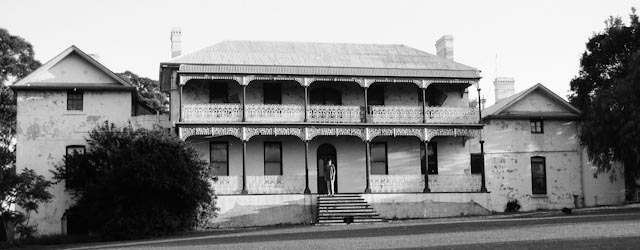
Brush Farm House (1820)

North Brush was also used variously to identify the bush north of the Parramatta River covering what is now known as West Ryde, Eastwood, Carlingford and Dundas. Brush Farm on the later border between Carlingford and Eastwood took its name from this usage and was applied to the estate (c. early 1800s) and then the house on the land (c.1820s).

Mobbs Hill was named after the Mobbs family whose land was nearby.

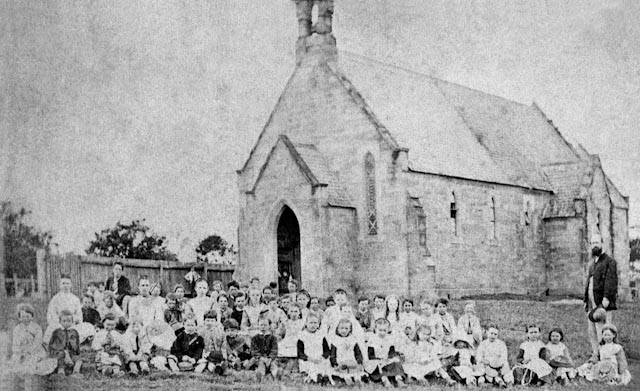
St Paul's Church of England School c.1850–1870

Pennant Hills referred variously to the ridge from Dundas to Mobbs Hill, the quarry in what is now Dundas Valley and the Government wharf at Ermington (1817). Pennant Hills was used in naming the location of St Paul's Church built on Mobbs Hill in 1850 and the associated denominational school which commenced around the same time. The school occupied purpose built premises next to the church from 1872 (demolished in the 1970s). When the new public school opened in the same building in January 1883 it was called Pennant Hills South Public School, changing its name to Carlingford Public School in 1887, shortly before moving into new premises across the road. By that date, the name Carlingford had become associated with the locality up to North Rocks and Pennant Hills referred to the area beyond. However, when the railway line opened from Clyde to the Carlingford district in April 1896 the station was called Pennant Hills (the station being on Pennant Hills Road) but was later changed to Carlingford in August 1901.

There was another Carlingford railway station earlier on. When the main northern railway line opened in September 1886 what was to become Epping Station (name adopted in July 1899) was called Field of Mars, then Carlingford (adopted in April 1887) with the area between it and the Carlingford district to the west known as East Carlingford after the post office of that name opened in October 1890. The Epping area had also been referred to formerly as Barren Ridges.

==== Orchard country ====
The need for food and economic development in the colony expanded white settlement to Parramatta in late 1788. Over the 1790s land grants for farms in the Parramatta area extended to what is now known as the Carlingford district, Kissing Point, North Brush, The Ponds, Field of Mars. Grants were given to Cox, Mobbs, Arndell and others.

Hard labour was required to clear land of the thick bush and then to cultivate, fence and provide housing. Many struggled with low yields of grain, lack of pig, sheep and cattle stock and isolation. Land ownership often turned over many times with larger land owners moving in during the early 1800s including Holt, Barrington, Randal, Kent, Samuel Marsden and John Macarthur.

Fruit growing had become the primary industry in the area by the 1830s as the larger estates were divided into smaller tenant or owner occupied holdings and a second wave of settlers moved into the area. Orange, other citrus, stone fruit, apple and pear orchards were common interspersed with crops such as potatoes and peas. Familiar names in the district, often from a convict background, had set down roots including the Mobbs, Eyles, Spurway, Sonter and other families.

Other economic activity in the district included timber getting from around 1817 with the government convict sawmill operating until about 1830 at the Pennant Hills Sawing Establishment at Barren Ridges (Epping). Timber was hauled to the Pennant Hills Wharf opened in 1817 at Ermington on the Parramatta River. Timber continued to be cut by private contractors into the 20th century. The Pennant Hills blue metal quarry at Dundas was also active from the 1830s.

Orchards and timber

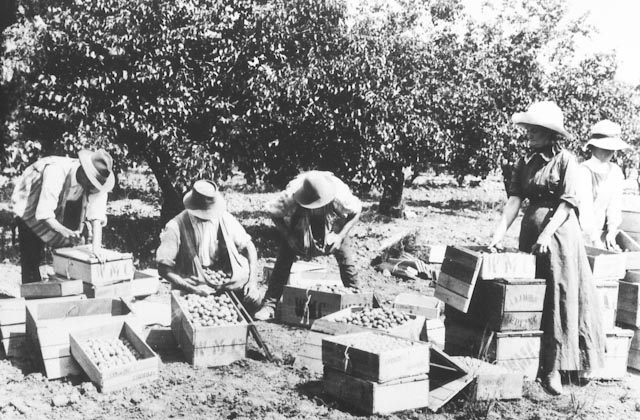
Orchards were prominent in Carlingford for over 100 years

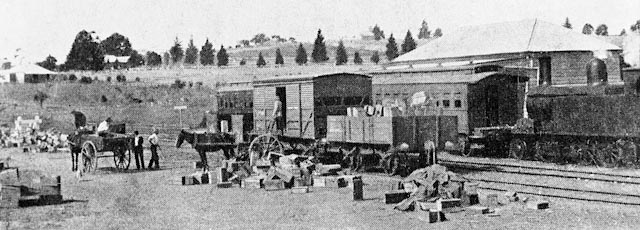
Loading fruit at Carlingford Railway Station for transport to market c.1923

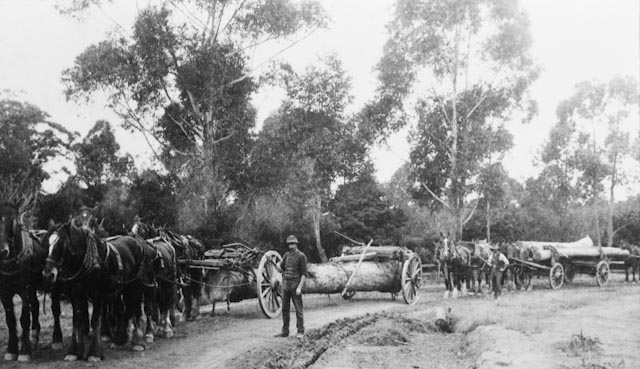
Timber drawing in the Carlingford-Epping area c.1915

A public telephone and telegraph service at the Carlingford Post Office began in December 1892 and gas mains were entering the district around the same time.

On the eve of Federation, Carlingford was struggling through the great 1890s economic depression but was poised to once again become a prosperous agricultural district. It had a private railway to take goods to market, '... a public school with 235 scholars and staff of six teachers, telephone and money order office, two lines of coaches, five stores, and blacksmith and baker's shop'.

=== After Federation 1901 ===
==== Early century ====
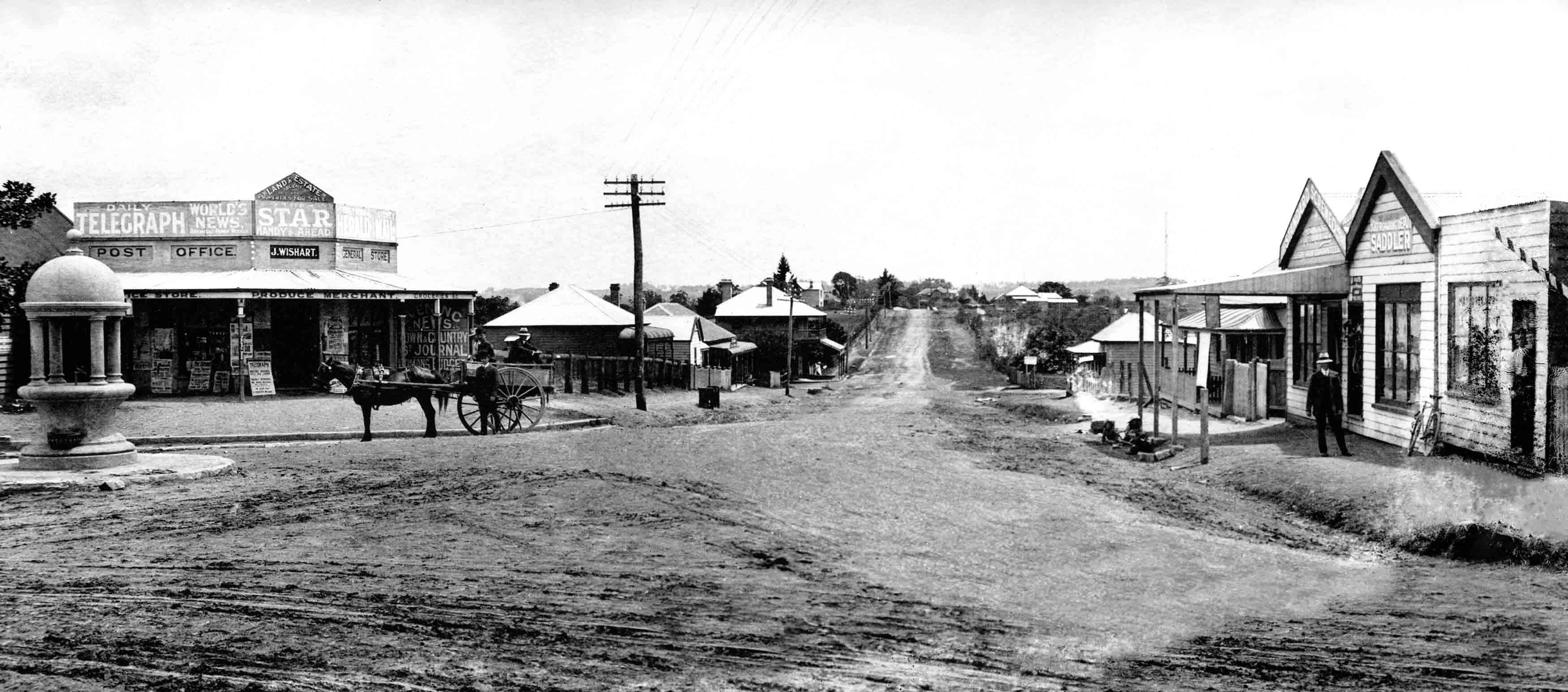
Looking north along Pennant Hills Road from Church Street (now Marsden Road), Mobbs Hill, Carlingford c.1912

The newly federated nation of Australia was at war when it came into existence on 1 January 1901, with some local men away serving for the British in the Second Anglo-Boer war in South Africa. Locally the failing private railway from Clyde to Pennant Hills had been taken over by the state government. With the latter station renamed Carlingford, the line reopened on 1 August 1901.

Alongside existing orchards, new nurseries and market gardens began to increase in number. While Carlingford was still distinctly rural, technological change in the district continued with the establishment of the Pennant Hills Wireless Telegraphy Station in 1912, extension of telephone lines, and the arrival of electric power in 1922. Additionally the area saw the laying of reticulated water mains in 1908, the creation of a metropolitan water storage reservoir on Mobbs Hill in 1916, and the installation of a public drinking-water fountain in the middle of the road at Mobbs Hill in 1911. The area also underwent a transition from horse drawn road transport to motorized, which led to the removal of the Mobbs Hill drinking fountain 1929 as it had become a hazard to the increased volume of motorized traffic. A Mechanics' Institute and Memorial Hall, designed by Sydney architect and Carlingford resident Lord Livingstone Ramsay, was opened at Mobbs Hill in 1924 (demolished 1987) and was the centre of many social events, political rallies, fetes and school activities.

The 1930s Great Depression contracted economic activity and the people of Carlingford struggled on. Owners of farms had relatively easier access to food than labourers.

Early 20th century at Carlingford

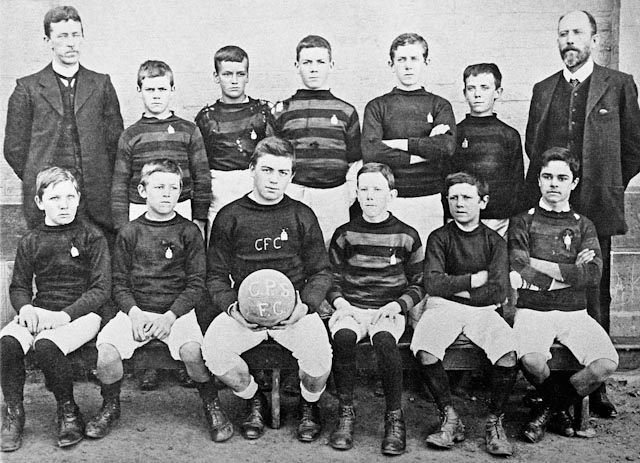
Carlingford Public School Football Club Barlow medal winners 1905

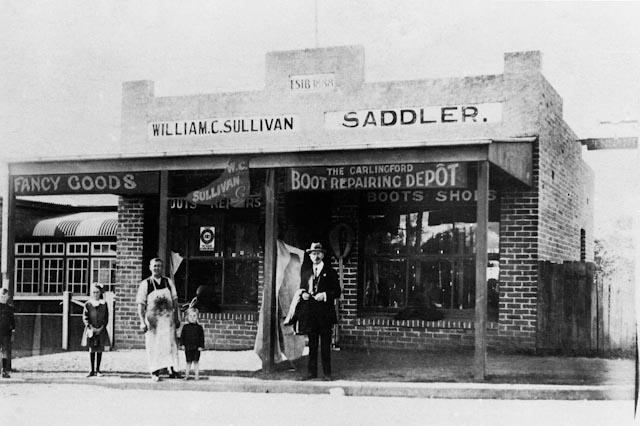
Saddler at Mobbs Hill c.1920

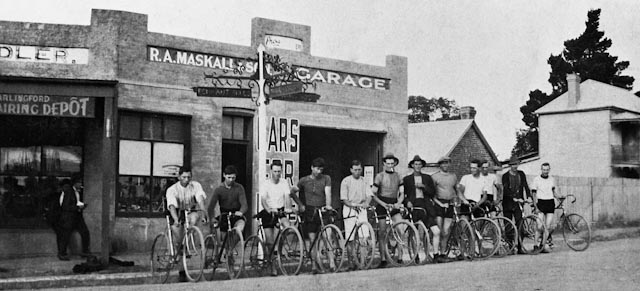
Cyclists at Mobbs Hill c.1930s

==== Children's homes ====
In April 1923 the Wesley Central Mission/ City Central Methodist Mission established the Dalmar Children's Homes on 15 acres (61,000 m^{2}) of land near Marsden Road in the eastern end of the suburb. The property eventually had many cottages, together with a hospital, an orchard and vegetable gardens. The land is now the site of the Alan Walker Retirement Village.

The suburb was also home to several homes for children operated by the Anglican Diocese of Sydney since the 1920s: The Church of England Boys' Home, Church of England Girls' Home, and the Havilah Children's Home, Tress Manning Temporary Care, and Field Cottage. Land owned by the homes has since been developed for housing, with street names such as Trigg, Marella, Carramar, Buckland and Lisgar reflecting the names of individual houses or Anglican Home Mission Society services. Boys' Home buildings and grounds are now the regional base and Sydney Australia Temple of the Church of Jesus Christ of Latter-day Saints. Girls' Home property in the south of the suburb has become, since 1974, Anglicare's Kingsdene Special School for severely to profoundly intellectually disabled children, as well as the American International School.

Some Carlingford war memorials

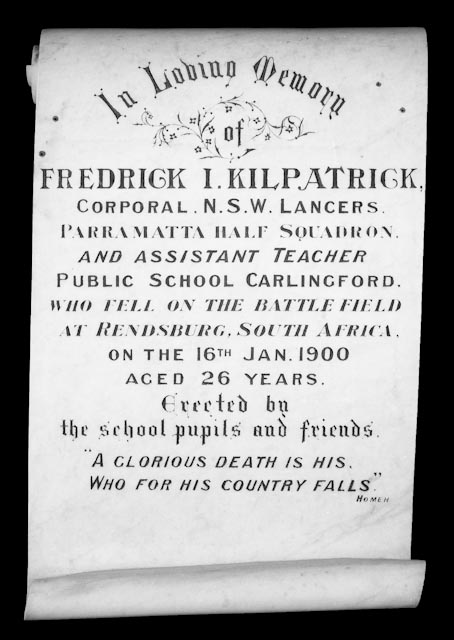
Kilpatrick Boer War memorial

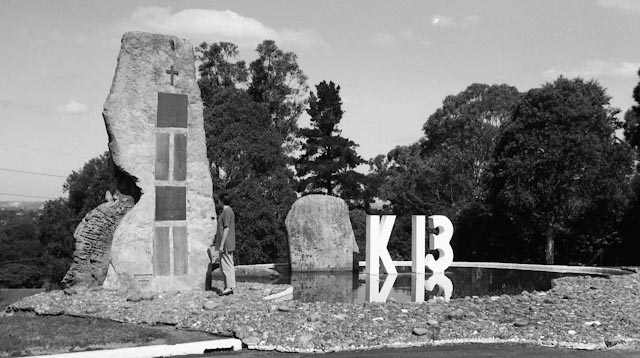
Submariners' memorial

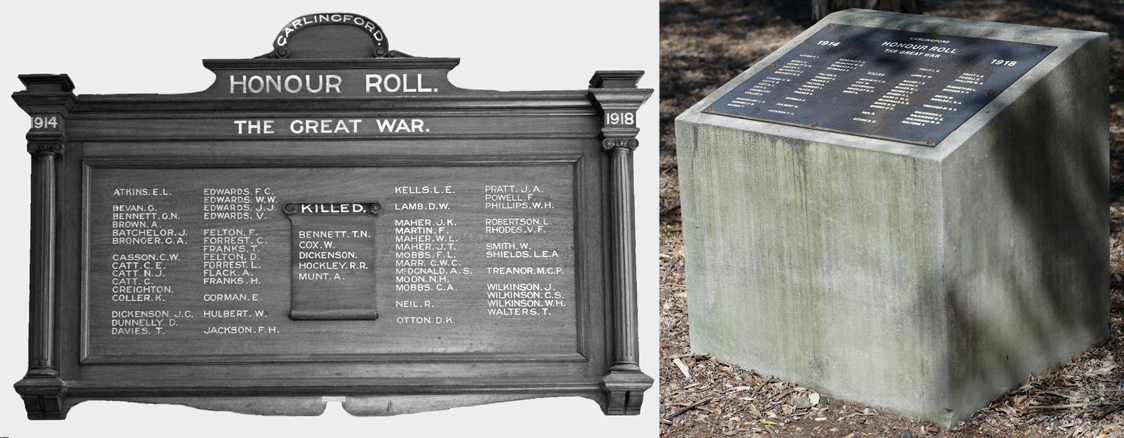
Carlingford Mechanics' Institute and Memorial Hall (1924–1987) World War I honour roll

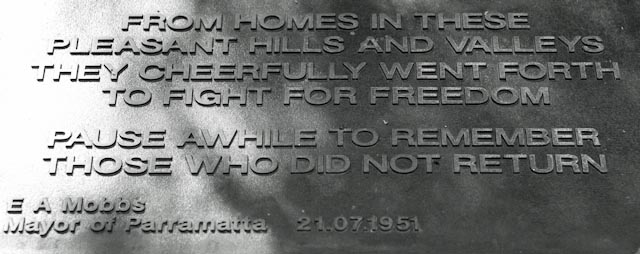
Memorial dedicated in 1951

==== Urbanization ====
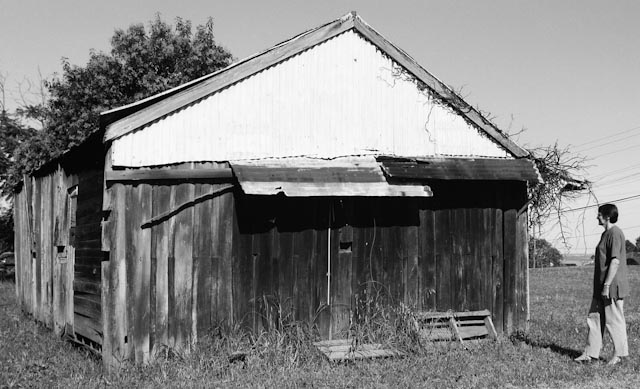
Remnant of agricultural past. Mid-19th century slab coach house demolished 1999

As Sydney rapidly expanded, following World War II, Carlingford underwent rapid urbanization. James Ruse Agricultural High School, established in 1959, is a testament to the agricultural history of Carlingford as well as the rapid pace of urbanisation; which soon made the school, and its large farm, somewhat of an anomaly amongst the 1970s and 1980s housing which dominate the suburb. Soon after James Ruse there followed upper-end housing. An example of which is Carlingford's Calinda Manse, a nine bedroom property. More recently, in the 1990s, the government policy of urban consolidation has seen the development of high-density units and apartment blocks around the town centre and the train station. There have also been redevelopments of older houses into medium-density townhouses, and duplex housing.

In 1961, the HMS K13 memorial was unveiled, and stands as a prominent feature in Carlingford, passed by thousands of motorists along Pennant Hills Road each day.

The first large shopping centre opened in 1965 as the Carlingford Village on a former orchard and nursery site. After redevelopment in the 1970s it was renamed Carlingford Court. Additional redevelopments of the centre occurred in the late 1990s with further changes when the Myer department store closed on 31 March 2006. The old 19th century and early 20th century shops and houses on the corner of Pennant Hills and Marsden Roads at Mobbs Hill were demolished in the 1970s, and "The Orchard" shopping centre was built on the site, and after later redevelopment it was renamed as Carlingford Village.

The rural guise of the district has largely disappeared: rapid urbanisation, subdivision, population growth and advent of car clogged roads has changed the area completely.

== Heritage ==
The Carlingford and nearby district hosts a wide range of built and natural heritage sites. These include Aboriginal cultural sites, houses, public buildings, churches, gardens, regeneration sites, industrial, war memorials, road infrastructure and former farm sites. Some of these are formally listed on the NSW State Heritage Register or identified in the NSW State Inventory. Several are also appear on the Register of the National Estate. As with much of suburban Sydney, many sites have been destroyed through years of development or neglect.

A handful of Carlingford and district's heritage sites include:

- Barrengarry House and outbuildings (c.1888) (now part of James Ruse Agricultural High School)
- Blaxland House, Brush Farm (c.1820), 19 Lawson Street, Eastwood
- Carlingford Produce Store (1902), 1 Thallon Street, Carlingford (demolished)
- Carlingford Public School building and cottage (1887), Marsden Rd, Carlingford
- Cemetery (1850), Marsden Road, Carlingford
- Old Dundas Quarry (Geological Corridor through Time), Evans Rd, Dundas Valley
- Galaringi Reserve, 356 Marsden Road, Carlingford
- Lauriston House (mid 1870s), Marsden Road, Dundas
- Marsden Road Uniting Church (1865), 203 Marsden Road, Carlingford
- Calinda Mansion, (late 1900s), 36 Felton Road, Carlingford
- Mobbs Hill Reservoir (1916), 224 Marsden Road, Carlingford
- Redstone (aka Winter House) (1935), architect: Walter Burley Griffin, Telopea
- Former St Paul's Anglican Church (1850), 346 Marsden Road, Carlingford
Carlingford heritage

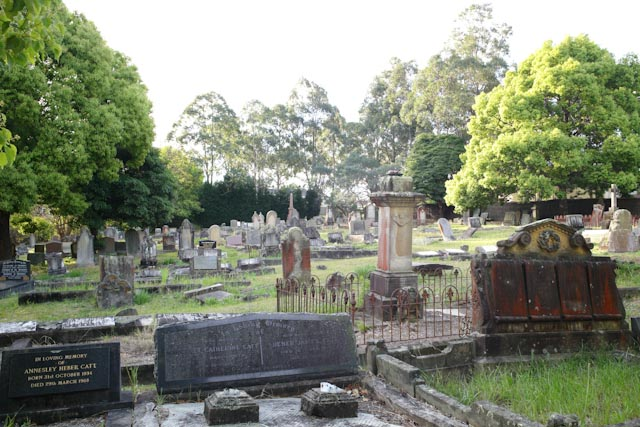
Carlingford cemetery established 1850

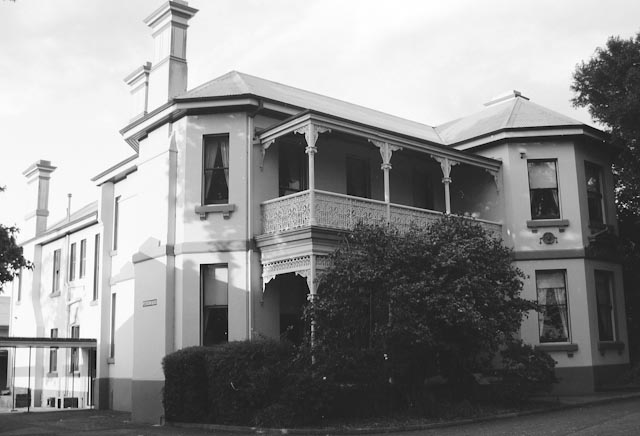
Barrengarry House (1885) now part of James Ruse Agricultural High School

Carlingford Pastoral (1935) by Roland Wakelin. Reproduced by permission of the Estate of Roland Wakelin

Carlingford was a favourite spot for the Northwood Group of landscape painters. In the 1930s-1940s this social group would gather to paint outdoors and included Lloyd Rees, Roland Wakelin, John Santry, Marie Santry and George Lawrence. Wakelin completed a number of paintings inspired by the district. Three include: Carlingford Pastoral (1935) incorporates built heritage elements of the Mobbs Hill landscape – two water reservoirs, St Paul's Church and the church hall; Afternoon, Carlingford (1949) inspired by Carlingford hills, houses and farms; similarly, House at Carlingford (1950) was inspired by the locale's buildings and land.

== Commercial areas ==
The major Carlingford shopping and commercial areas are located on Pennant Hills Road. The main, two small to medium-sized shopping centres are Carlingford Court and Carlingford Village, (which has a JUSCO). There are several shopping strips across the suburb, including but not limited to; on the corner of Pennant Hills Rd and Marsden Road ('at the top' of Mobbs Hill), on Pennant Hills Road near Carlingford Railway Station ('at the bottom' of Mobbs Hill), on Mobbs Lane, to the north on Carmen Drive, and Carlingford North shops off North Rocks Rd near Pennant Parade.

Carlingford Court (opened in 1965 as "Carlingford Village") on the corner of Pennant Hills and Carlingford Roads is a medium-sized suburban shopping centre featuring supermarkets, department and variety stores, and specialty shops.

Carlingford Village (opened in the 1970s as "The Orchard" shopping centre) on the corner of Pennant Hills and Marsden Roads on top of Mobbs Hill includes many Asian food outlets.

Carlingford shopping centres

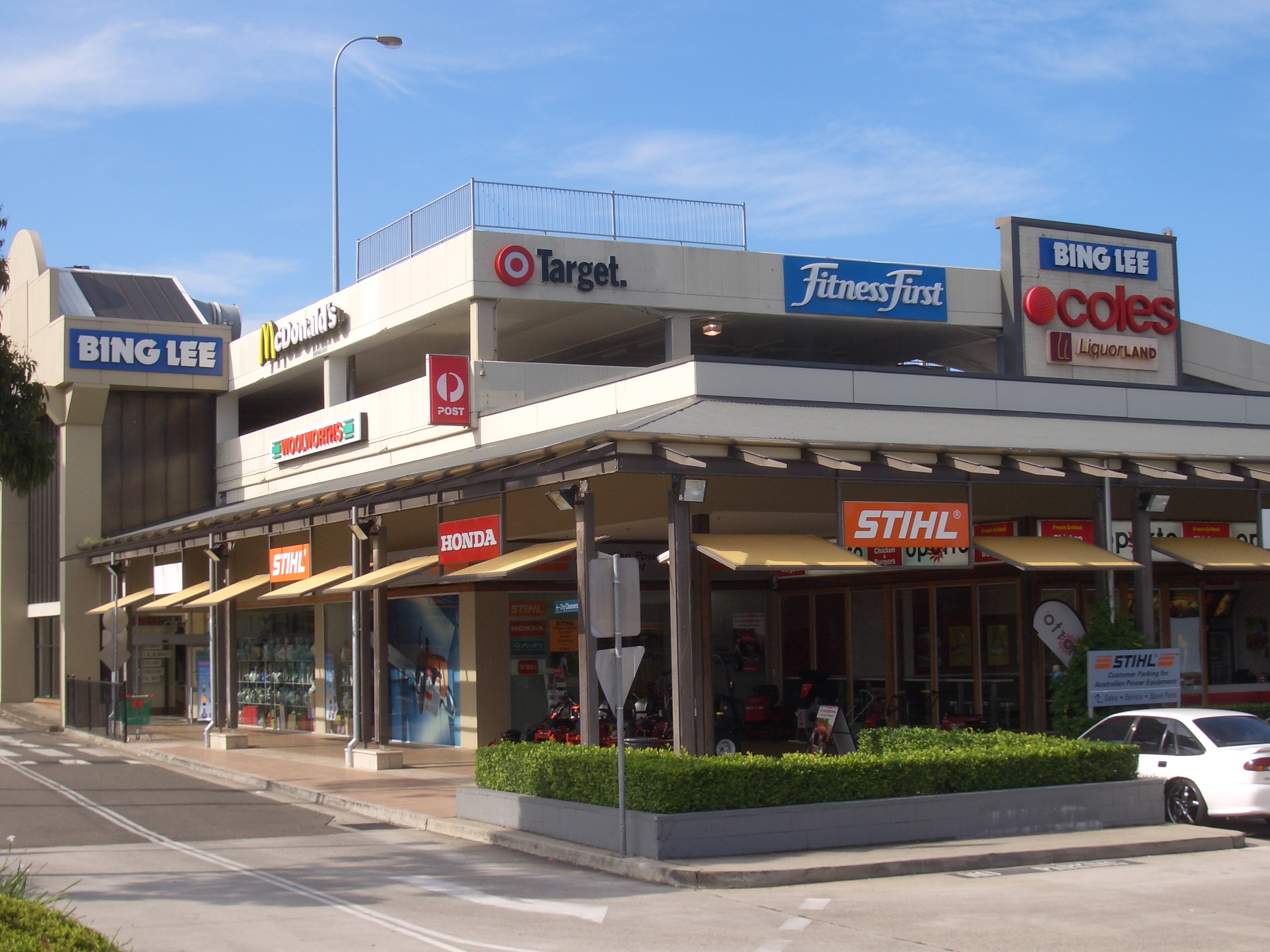
Carlingford Court shopping centre

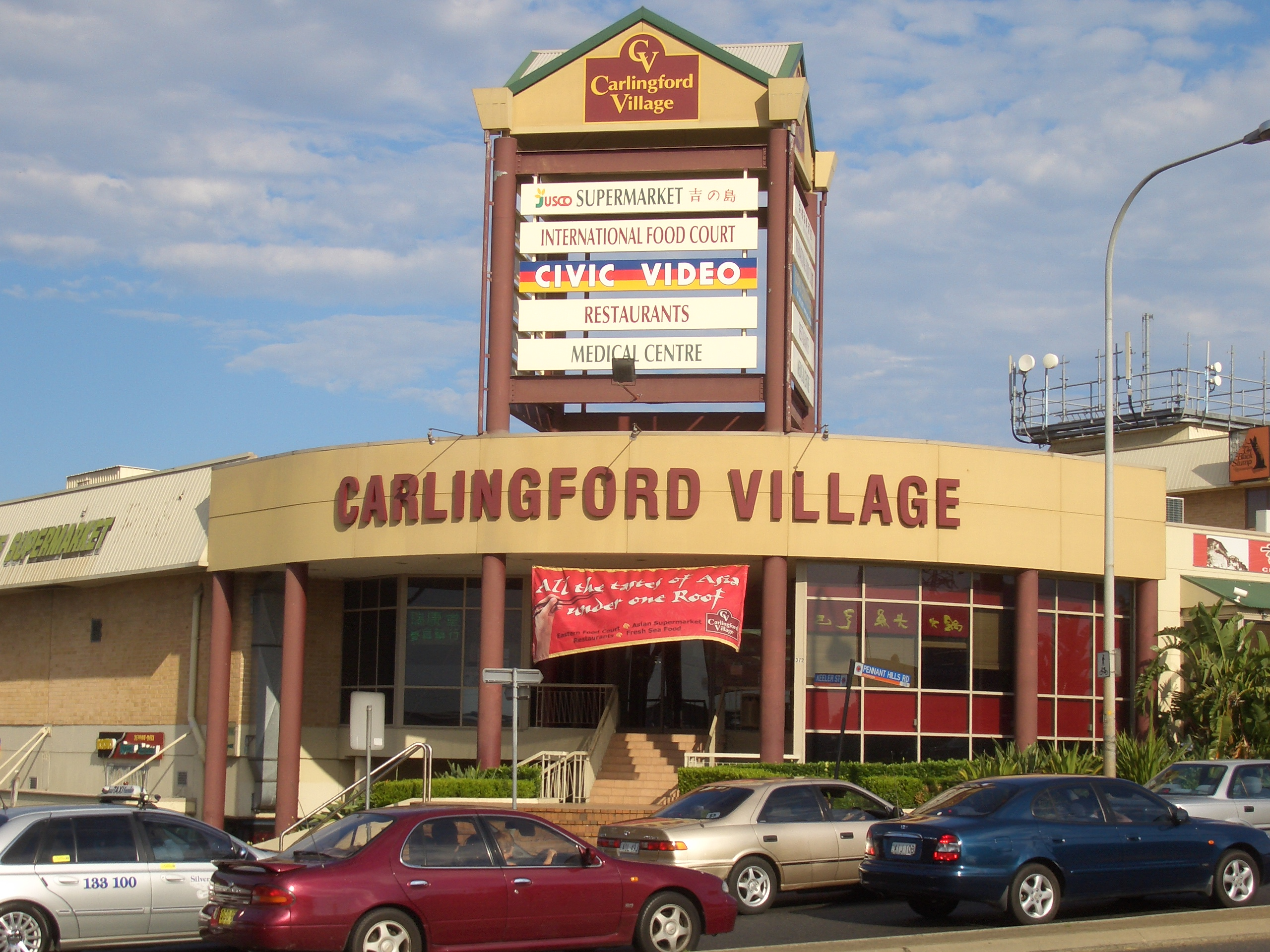
Carlingford Village shopping centre

== Transport ==
Much of Carlingford has relatively limited public transport access, which is reflected in the low public transport patronage by commuters. At the 2011 census, 18.1% of employed people travelled to work on public transport and 64.1% by car (either as driver or as passenger).

=== Roads ===
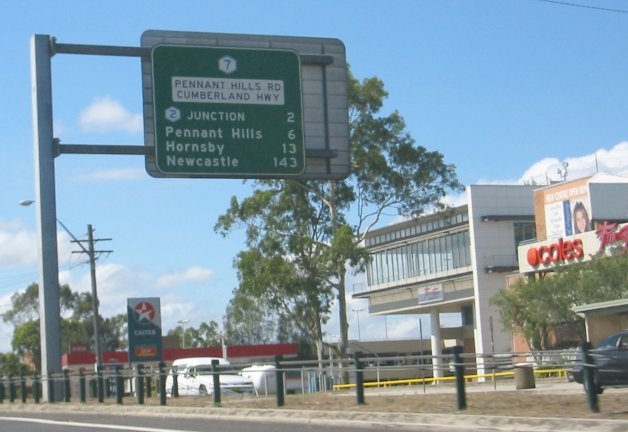
Cumberland Highway, Carlingford

At the 2011 census, 64.1% of employed people travelled to work by car: 59.5% as driver and 4.3% as passenger. The Cumberland Highway, a major north–south route through greater Sydney, intersects Carlingford in the form of Pennant Hills Road. As well, many motorists commuting from the Hills District and the growing north-west areas of Sydney travel through Carlingford to the city.

The M2 Hills Motorway, part of the Sydney orbital road, runs through northern Carlingford providing a route to the city and North Sydney. Since the Westlink M7 Motorway was finished, completing the Sydney Orbital, it has replaced the Cumberland Highway as the north–south national highway.

The area of Carlingford to the east of Pennant Hills Road and North of Carlingford Road, was built mostly in the years, post World War II. There is an area of streets named after famous North African battle fields.

=== Buses ===
There are several bus routes through Carlingford. Major bus stations are located at Carlingford Court Shopping Centre, Carlingford Railway Station and Oakes Road M2 bus stop.

State Transit 513 Carlingford Court to Meadowbank Wharf via Telopea, Dundas Valley, West Ryde

546 Epping to Parramatta via Ray Road, Carlingford Court, Carlingford Station, Jenkins Road, Farnell Avenue, Balaka Drive, North Rocks Shopping Centre, Statham Avenue, Bettington Road

549 Epping to Parramatta via Ray Road, Pennant Parade, North Rocks Road, O’Connell Avenue

550 Macquarie Park to Parramatta via Macquarie Centre and University, Epping Road, Epping Station, Carlingford Road, Pennant Hills Road

Hillsbus 535 Carlingford line replacement service to Parramatta via Telopea, Dundas, Rydalmere and Rosehill Stations

M2 services stop at Oakes Road, destinations include Queen Victoria Building, Milson's Point, Macquarie Park, Baulkham Hills, Castle Hill, Kellyville, Rouse Hill

625 Pennant Hills Station to Parramatta via Pennant Hills Road

630 Epping to Blacktown via Carlingford Road, Pennant Hills Road, North Rocks Road, Barclay Road, Baulkham Hills, Winston Hills, Seven Hills

Previous operator Harris Park Transport ceased operations in December 2004 with routes 620–630.

=== Rail ===
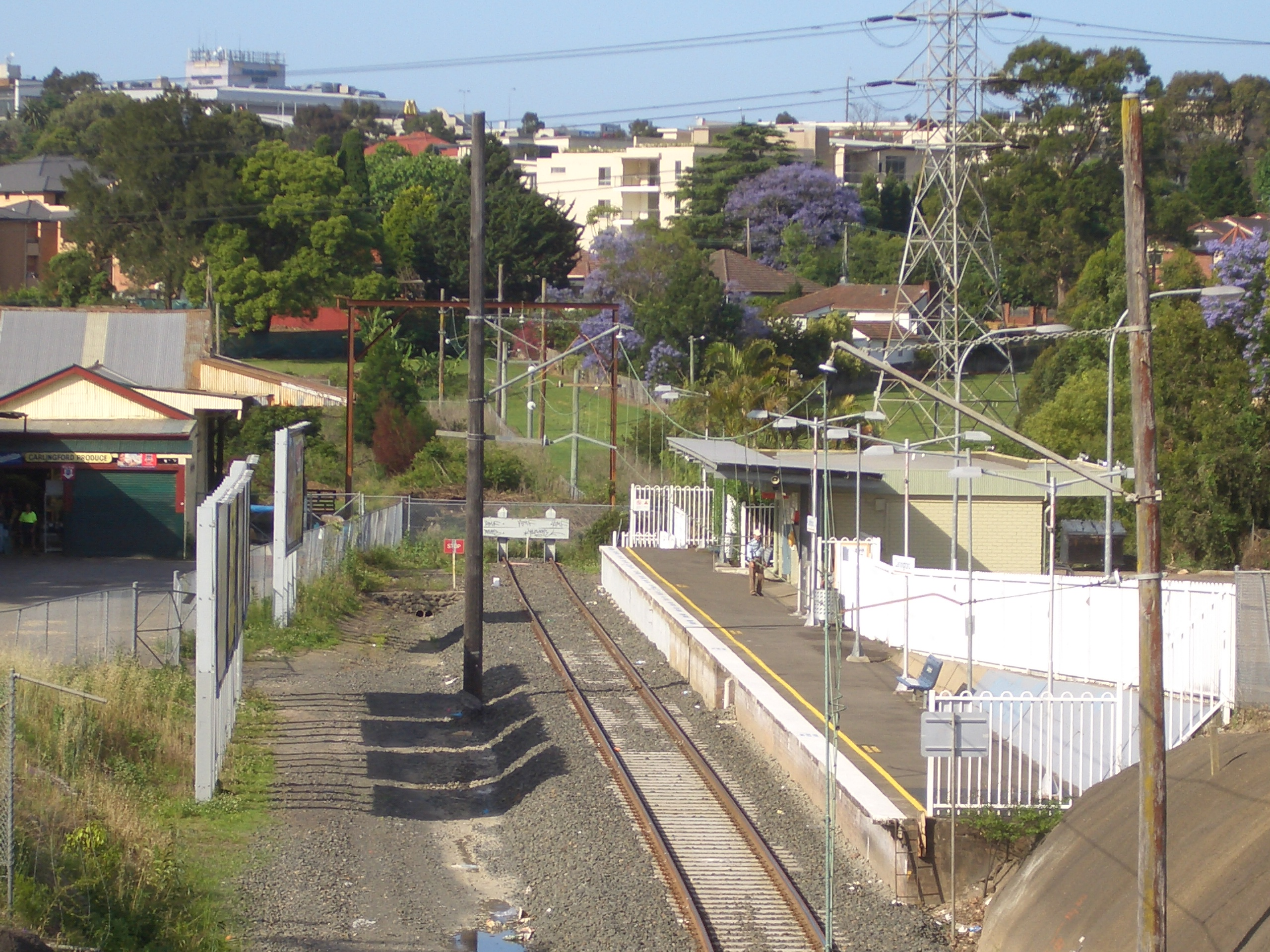
The end of the line at Carlingford railway station

Carlingford railway station was the terminus of the Carlingford Line on the Sydney Trains network. The Carlingford Line, which opened on 20 April 1896 as a private railway, then as a public line on 1 August 1901, was a mostly single-track line. Trains operated as all stops services to Clyde railway station every 30 or 60 minutes, before terminating where passengers would then have to change for a train service to the city. Consequently, the service had low patronage. As part of the CityRail Clearways Project, a passing loop was promised for the Carlingford Line with two services per hour all day to become effective in 2010. This was however scrapped in the 2008 mini-budget.

A conversion of the Camellia to Carlingford section of the Carlingford railway line to light rail was announced in 2015 as part of the Parramatta Light Rail project. On 5 January 2020, the railway line shut down between Clyde and Carlingford railway stations to commence construction of the Parramatta Light Rail Project, due to be opened in late 2024. A bus service, Route 535, running all stops between Parramatta railway station and ex-Carlingford Railway Station, was introduced as a measure to replace the rail service during the construction.

The light rail station opened in 20 December 2024, serving as the terminus for the L4 Westmead & Carlingford line.

== Schools ==
Carlingford is the location of a large number of public and private schools.

- Carlingford High School
- Carlingford Public School (see early school history above under Etymology)
- Carlingford West Public School
- Cumberland High School
- James Ruse Agricultural High School (Selective)
- Murray Farm Public School
- Roselea Public School
- St Gerard's Primary Catholic School

== Places of worship ==
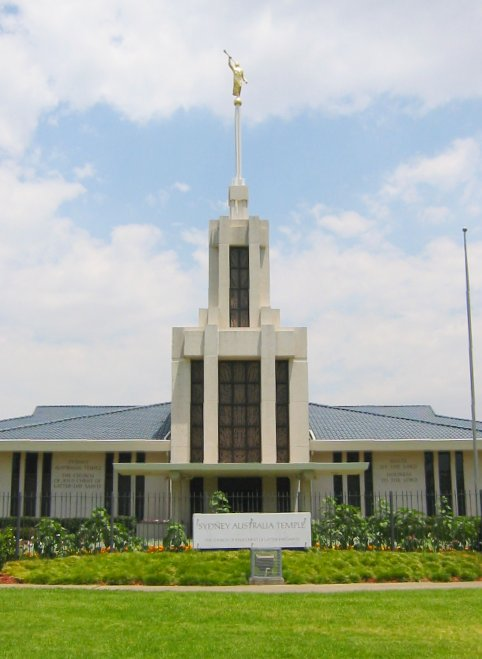
LDS Sydney Australia Temple, Carlingford

As with much of northern Sydney, Carlingford also has a comparatively large number of Christian churches of many denominations. These include:

- Carlingford Uniting Church
- Marsden Road Uniting Church
- Carlingford Baptist Church
- Carlingford Presbyterian Church
- Carlingford St. Gerard Majella Catholic Church
- St. Paul's Anglican Church
- Carlingford Iglesia Ni Cristo Church of Christ
- Carlingford C3 Church

Other places of worship include:

- The Pacific headquarters and Sydney Australia Temple of the Church of Jesus Christ of Latter-day Saints was constructed in Carlingford in 1984.
- There is a Mahāyāna Buddhist temple at Man Su Vihara.

== Sport ==
Carlingford has many sporting clubs participating in many different sports, and at many locations around the Hills District, including:

- Carlingford Baseball
- Carlingford Bowling Sports & Recreation Club
- Carlingford Comets Netball Club
- Carlingford Cougars Junior Rugby League Football Club
- Carlingford Netball Club (NetSetGo accredited)
- Carlingford United Football Club
- Carlingford Waratah Cricket Club
- Roselea Football Club
- Roselea Ladybirds Netball Club

== Services ==
The Carlingford telephone exchange is located at 413 North Rocks Rd. It serves telephony for Carlingford and nearby suburbs such as Dundas Valley, Telopea and North Rocks.

A major electricity substation, operated by Integral Energy, is located at the corner of Pennant Hills Road and Jenkins Road. The same site also houses one of the major communications relay towers in northern Sydney. The substation previously had a rail siding from the adjacent Carlingford Line; the siding was opened in 1954, and closed in the late 1980s.

== Population ==
=== Demographics ===
Historical population
Year	Pop.	±%
2001	19,459	—
2006	21,365	+9.8%
2011	21,570	+1.0%
2016	24,394	+13.1%
2021	28,044	+15.0%

In the Australian Bureau of Statistics 2021 census, the population of Carlingford stood at 28,044 residents, with 13,912 males and 14,132 females.

Age distribution In the 2021 census, the median age was 38, compared with 38 for the whole of Australia. Children aged up to 14 years made up 20.8% of the population and people aged 65 years and over made up 16.0% of the population.

Place of Birth In the 2021 census, 42.0% of people were born in Australia, with 19.4% born in China (excluding SARs and Taiwan), 4.9% in Hong Kong, 4.9% in India and 4.5% in South Korea.

Languages In the 2021 census, 32.9% of people only spoke English at home, while 22.1% spoke Mandarin, 13.2% spoke Cantonese, 6.3% spoke Korean, 2.4% spoke Urdu and 2.1% spoke Hindi.

Religion In the 2021 census, 39.0% of people identify themselves as having no religion, 14.9% Catholic and 6.6% Anglican.

== Politics ==
Carlingford falls under the jurisdiction of the City of Parramatta. It falls in the Commonwealth electorate of Parramatta and the State electorate of Epping.

Most of the electoral divisions that Carlingford lies within have historically been held by the Liberal Party of Australia. The exception is the electoral division and district of Parramatta which include sections south of the Parramatta River, making the overall seats more marginal in nature.

== Bibliography ==
- Britton, Alexander (1894). History of New South Wales from the Records, Vol. II, Sydney: Government Printer
- Brook, J. and Kohen, J. L. (1991). The Parramatta Native Institution and the Black Town: a history, Kensington: University of NSW Press
- Campbell, Judith (2002). Invisible invaders: smallpox and other diseases in Aboriginal Australia 1780–1880, Melbourne: Melbourne University Press
- Carr, Pullen and McCluskey (1990). Transport in the Hills District 1805–1990, Parramatta: Hills District Historical Society Inc. and Macarthur Press
- Forsyth, John H. (1982). Station names: date of opening, closing and/or change of name, meaning or origin of name, Sydney: State Rail Authority of New South Wales
- Forsyth, John H. (editor) (1988–93). Stations & tracks; Vol. 1: main suburban & branches -- Illawarra & branches, Sydney: State Rail Authority of New South Wales
- Garland, Roger (1983). Carlingford Public School centenary, 1883–1983, Carlingford: Carlingford Public School
- Hawkins, R. (unpublished manuscript 2011). Aboriginal life in the Blue Gum High Forest referenced in The Aboriginal heritage of Beecroft and Cheltenham (Beecroft and Cheltenham History Group web site, retrieved 4 Sep 2013)
- Hibble, Walter (1914). Early history of Ryde and surrounding districts, Sydney: Journal and Proceedings Royal Australian Historical Society, vol.III, part VI, 1916
- Holt, Joseph (editor O’Shaghnessy, Peter) (c.1988). A rum story: the adventures of Joseph Holt, thirteen years in New South Wales (1800–12), Kenthurst: Kangaroo Press
- Hopson, N. C. and Tobin, R. (1999). NSW and ACT post, receiving, telegraph & telephone offices: their circular date-stamps and postal history, Sydney: self-published
- Jervis, James (reprint 1978). The cradle city of Australia: a history of Parramatta 1788–1961, Sydney: John Sands
- McAndrew, Alex (1999). Carlingford-Epping: partners in history, Epping: self-published
- Mobbs, Eric Arthur, (editor Beryl Mobbs Lewis) (1984). From poverty to mayor of a city: being the life story and memories in brief of Eric Arthur Mobbs, Yagoona: self-published
- Pollon, Frances and Healy, Gerald (1988). The book of Sydney suburbs, Sydney: Angus and Robertson
- Reed, A. W. (1969). Place names of New South Wales: their origins and meanings, Sydney: A. H.& A.W. Reed
- Smith, Keith Vincent (2005). Wallumedegal: an Aboriginal history of Ryde, Ryde: Community Services Unit, City of Ryde
- Walton, Leslie (1987). The art of Roland Wakelin, Seaforth: Craftsman House
