= Danish Twin Registry =

Registry of twins in Denmark

The Danish Twin Registry, also known as the Danish Twin Register, is a twin registry aiming to include records of all twins in the country of Denmark. Established in 1954, it is the oldest nationwide twin registry in the world. It initially included only twins born in Denmark from 1870 to 1910, but it has since grown to include almost all twins born in the country since 1870. It includes over 86,000 twin pairs, making it one of the largest twin registries in the world, and it is considered to be representative of the general population of Denmark. It includes biological data and repeated measurements from the same subjects, as well as information from other national registers in Denmark.
