= Andrew Christensen =

American clinical psychologist and professor

Andrew Christensen is a distinguished research professor at University of California, Los Angeles, specializing in clinical psychology. He is also a published author of 10 books, and is held in 3,151 libraries worldwide, the highest held book being in 804 libraries.
