= Bjørn Kristensen =

Bjørn Kristensen is the name of:

- Bjørn Kristensen (footballer, born 1963), Danish footballer
- Bjorn Kristensen (footballer, born 1993), Maltese footballer
- Bjørn Martin Kristensen (born 2002), Norwegian-born Filipino basketball player
