= Heather Christensen =

American model (born 1979)

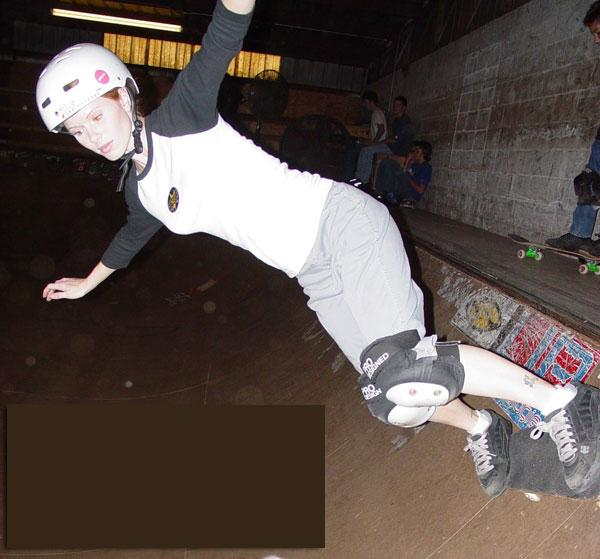
- Christensen skateboarding in Tampa, Florida, 2002.
- Born: October 1, 1979 (age 47); Cleveland, Ohio, U.S.
- Modeling information
- Height: 5 ft 5 in (165 cm)
- Hair color: Red
- Eye color: Blue

Heather Christensen (born October 1, 1979) is an American glamor model, noted for her work in various Playboy publications.

She was Playboy Special Editions Model of the Year for 2001. In 2002, she posed as a mermaid in the Wet and Wild 2002 edition.

Christensen was born and raised in Cleveland, Ohio, and moved to Tampa, Florida when she was 20. She was seen by a scout from Playboy, and began to model, which "sort of interrupted" her longer term plans.

Christensen has a wide range of hobbies, including rock climbing, diving, snowboarding, hiking, and singing. She is an especially noted skateboarder, who has been skating since 1998, first with a boyfriend, then by herself. The hobby cost her a broken arm, at Skatopia in Ohio, when she fell on a metal ramp; the fracture forced her to quit her job (and her boyfriend left her). She stayed with the hobby, and later lived with professional skateboarder Anthony Furlong. Playboy airbrushed out the scars on her arm in her pictures, and asked her to skate topless for a pictorial (which she says was "... embarrassing. I was like 'this hurts really bad!'"). The hobby has been a conflict for her modeling, as she can't skate for a week before a pictorial, to avoid bruises.

Christensen continued to study while working as a model. She earned a bachelor's degree in biology, and went to veterinary school, to become a veterinarian specializing in reptiles. She says she'd like to "Live in a tropical paradise [...] traveling around the world rescuing exotic animals", and has kept turtles, snakes, lizards, and frogs at her home. Other hobbies include restoring a 1968 Ford Mustang.

| Preceded by Sydney Moon | Playboy Cyber Girl of the Week; 2002-01-14 | Succeeded by Erin Wills |
