= Kasper Kristensen =

Kasper Kristensen is the name of:

- Kasper Kristensen (footballer, born 1986), Danish footballer
- Kasper Kristensen (footballer, born 1999), Danish footballer

== See also ==
- Casper Christensen, Danish comedian
