= Allen Christensen =

Allen Christensen may refer to:

- Allen Christensen (footballer) (born 1991), Australian rules footballer
- Allen M. Christensen (born 1946), American politician from Utah
