= East Germany national under-23 football team =

East Germany national under-23 football team may refer to:

- East Germany national under-21 football team, which replaced the U-23 team in 1978
- East Germany Olympic football team, which competes in the Olympic football tournament, an under-23 competition
