= Peter Christensen =

Peter Christensen may refer to:

- Peter F. Christensen (born 1952), American prelate and bishop
- Peter Seier Christensen (born 1967), Danish politician for The New Right
- Peter Christensen (politician, born 1975) (1975–2025), Danish politician for Venstre
- Peter Gade Christensen (born 1976), Danish badminton player
- Peter H. Christensen (born 1981), American art historian

== See also ==
- Per Christensen (1934–2009), Norwegian actor
- Peter Christiansen (disambiguation)
