= Mathias Kristensen =

Mathias Kristensen may refer to:

- Mathias Kristensen (footballer, born 1993), Danish footballer
- Mathias Kristensen (footballer, born 1997), Danish footballer
