= Naja Kristensen =

Greenlandic politician

Naja Kristensen (née Petersen; born 1968) is a Greenlandic politician (Atassut).

== Early life and education ==
Kristensen was born in Ilulissat in 1968. She was trained as a social worker and worked with children and young people in what was then the Aasiaat community. She has three children with her husband Knud Erik Kristensen.

== Political career ==
Kristensen was a member of the Aasiaat Municipality Council. She was a candidate in the 2005 parliamentary elections and received 147 votes, putting her in fifth place in the Atassut. In October 2007 she came to Inatsisartut for three weeks as a deputy of Augusta Salling. On 4 November 2008, she returned to parliament and three days later, she was appointed as Minister for Health and Environment to succeed Arĸalo Abelsen in the Enoksen V Cabinet, which she remained until the end of the 2009 legislative period. In 2008, she was elected to the council of the new municipality of Qaasuitsup. In the 2009 parliamentary elections, she received 144 votes, making her second place to Atassut. In the fall of 2009, she sat as deputy for Knud Kristiansen in the Inatsisartut after Gerhardt Petersen had waived his place in front of her. In 2013, she did not take part in the general election, but was re-elected to the local council in the same year. In the 2014 general election, she received only 32 votes. In the 2017 local elections, she received the only Atassut mandate in the new municipality of Qeqertalik, as well as four years later in the 2021 local elections.
