= Pen Phath =

Cambodian footballer (born 1948)

Personal information
- Date of birth: 5 April 1948 (age 78)
- Place of birth: Kampong Cham, French Indochina
- Position: Forward

Senior career*
Years	Team	Apps	(Gls)
1965–1972	ASBA		
1972–1977	Rajpracha FC		
1977–1978	Paris FC		

International career
- Cambodia

Managerial career
- CSL Aulnay (youth)
- 2015: Western Phnom Penh FC
- * Club domestic league appearances and goals

Pen Phath (Khmer: ប៉ែន ផាត; born 5 April 1948) is a Cambodian former football manager and footballer who played as a forward. He represented the Cambodia national football team during its most successful period, including the 1972 Asian Cup, where Cambodia finished fourth.

== Playing career ==
Pen Phath began playing football at the age of seven while studying at Tuol Thmar School in Kampong Cham Province. His performances at school level earned him selection to the school team at the age of fourteen.

In 1963, at the age of 15, he moved to Phnom Penh and was selected for the Cambodia national football team after impressing coaches in a friendly match. During the 1960s, Cambodia was regarded as one of Southeast Asia’s strongest teams. At there, he also joined the clubs ASBA and won a lot of trophies in Cambodia league.

In 1972, Phath joined Thai club Rajpracha FC. He played for the club until 1977, helping Rajpracha win two Thai league titles and two domestic cup competitions. During his time in Thailand, he was selected for a Thai All-Stars team that played against Santos FC of Brazil, featuring Pelé, in 1972.

After leaving Thailand, Phath signed for French club Paris FC for the 1977–78 season, marking the final stage of his professional playing career. He was nicknamed “Snake” during his career due to his movement and dribbling ability.

== International career ==
Pen Phath was part of the Cambodian national team that finished fourth at the 1972 AFC Asian Cup. Cambodia lost the third-place play-off to Thailand on penalties after a 2–2 draw in regulation time.

== Coaching career ==
After retiring as a player, Phath worked as a youth coach in France, including at CSL Aulnay. In 2015, he returned to Cambodia and served as head coach of Western Phnom Penh FC.

== Personal life ==
Pen Phath was born in Kampong Cham Province to farming parents, Pen Seang and Yim Sat, and has five siblings.

He married in France in 1979 and later obtained French citizenship. He is the father of former Cambodia international Stéphane Pen.

== Honours ==
ASBA

- Cambodia League champions: 1969, 1970, 1971, 1972

Rajpracha FC

- Thai league champions: 1972–73, 1974–75
- Thai domestic cup titles (2)

Cambodia

- Fourth place, AFC Asian Cup: 1972
