= Anna Christensen =

Swedish legal scholar

Anna Christensen (1936–2001) was a professor of private law at the Faculty of Law at Lund University, Sweden and a columnist in the Swedish newspaper Dagens Nyheter. Academically, Christensen is most well-known for her books Studies in the Law of Sale of Goods (Studier i Köprätt), Disqualification from Unemployment Benefits (Avstängning från arbetslöshetsförsäkring) and Residential Right in the Tenement House (Hemrätt i hyreshus), and for the development of the Theory of Law as Normative Patterns in a Normative Field. In 1975, Christensen became the first woman professor in legal science in Sweden.

== Biography and academic career ==
Anna Christensen was born in 1937 in Tumba, Sweden. She studied law at Stockholm University and carried out her studies in Uppsala where she, in 1970, successfully defended her dissertation in Commercial Law; Studies in the Law of Sale of Goods (Studier i Köprätt). Her doctoral thesis dealt with some of the problems concerning the right to treat a contract as of sale of goods as discharged – the right of rescission – in various situations that may rise in the course of performance. Focus was put on those special considerations relevant to the right of rescission which depended on how far performance had proceeded when the question of rescission came up. Five years later, in 1975, Anna Christensen was appointed Professor in Private Law at the Faculty in Law at Lund University.

During the years following her dissertation, the research of Anna Christensen came to concentrate on the law of Welfare Society, i.e. those parts of the legal system that are developed to protect everyday life of the common men and women; Labour Law, Housing Law and Social Security Law were all to become her domain and main fields of research. In Disqualification from Unemployment Benefits (Avstängning från arbetslöshetsförsäkring), from 1980, Christensen studied the Swedish rules on disqualification from unemployment benefits on the ground of refusal of work and other self-imposed unemployment. The main purpose of the study was to disclose the control and steering of the citizens that is built into the Swedish social security system. According to Christensen, there was a strong interest on the part of the state to conceal the role that the Job Service played in the system. Furthermore, Christensen meant that the state had an interest in concealing how the behavior-steering and repressive functions of the social security system were inseparably associated with the supportive functions of the system – a fact that contradicted the ideology surrounding the Welfare State. The study represented an important shift in Christensen’s research towards a more theoretical, social-science-oriented and critical approach.

Christensen’s interest in normative developments continued over the years, and in the study Residential Right in the Tenement House (Hemrätt i hyreshuset), 1994, she took the first steps towards creating the Theory of Law as Normative Patterns in a Normative Field. The theme of the study was the social security of tenancy and the residential rights in the tenement house. According to Christensen, this was a legal study, mainly conducted with a legal-dogmatic method and based on traditional legal materials, but the aim of the study went further than describing the precise content of the legal rules at a given moment. Instead, Christensen wanted to reveal underlying norms constituting society; Christensen explains how the rules on security of tenancy had developed in a field between two normative poles – one being the right to property of the owner, the other being the residential right in the tenement house. The study, as well as the article ‘Protection of Established Position, a Basic Normative Pattern’ that was published in 1996, reflect the emphasis on historical and normative developments that characterized Anna Christensen’s research.

In the mid- and late 1990s, Anna Christensen displayed a growing interest in European comparative social security law, and took inter alia part in different comparative research projects at European level. This last phase of Anna Christensen’s research coincided with the creation of the Norma Research Programme together with Professor Ann Numhauser-Henning in 1996. The programme, based at the Faculty of Law at Lund University was, and still is, an interdisciplinary research programme studying the normative developments within the Social Dimension from a European integration perspective.

Anna Christensen was awarded a doctor honoris causa at the Law Faculty at Oslo University in 1994 and at the Law Faculty at Copenhagen University in 2000.

== Non-academic career ==
Besides her academic work, Anna Christensen was a long time columnist in the Swedish daily newspaper Dagens Nyheter, and in 1999 she was awarded the Frihetspenna by the Torgny Segerstedt Foundation with the following motivation: 'Anna Christensen is in a quiet and effective way courageous and moral. She distinguishes the structures of injustice. She is an eye-opener who clear-sightedly refuses to be drawn into the trendy and politically correct. She stands for justice.'

== The Theory of Law as Normative Patterns in a Normative Field ==
The theory of law as normative patterns in a normative field was developed by Anna Christensen in a number of published articles following the book Residential Right in the Tenement House (1994). The theory is based on the thesis that different basic normative patterns can be distinguished in the multitude of legal norms. As social life is quite complex, these normative patterns do not make up the ‘hierarchical legal system’ we frequently imagine. Instead, these patterns are being set into play in a normative field as determined by the different basic patterns, which also act as normative poles. Another component of the theoretical framework is the functional relationship between the legal system and the structure of society and conditions of economic production, elaborated in the work of Professor Ann Numhauser-Henning. The basic normative patterns are held to reflect normative practices functional to society and human relationships. They thus reflect – and codify – social normative conceptions and practices aimed at making long-lasting human relationships and sustainable societies possible, and they are closely related to societal conditions. Changes in the underlying conditions of production provide explanations for many of the movements in the normative field and the new legal institutions, which have arisen to satisfy fundamental normative demands. However, the basic normative patterns all represent enduring legitimate normative conceptions in society, and it is the task of legislators and courts to balance these conceptions within the framework of law.
