= Telstra Super =

Australian superannuation fund

TelstraSuper
- Industry: Superannuation
- Headquarters: Melbourne, Australia
- Key people: Chris Davies (CEO), Paul Curtin (CFO), Graeme Miller (CIO), Anne-Marie O’Loghlin (Chair of the Board)
- Website: www.telstrasuper.com.au

TelstraSuper is an Australian superannuation fund headquartered in Melbourne, Victoria.

Originally established in 1994 for Telstra employees, TelstraSuper opened its membership to the public in 2022. It's Australia's largest corporate superannuation fund with over $23 billion in assets invested on behalf of members.

TelstraSuper members can access a range of services including online tools and calculators, personalised dashboards, insurance, webinars, seminars and more. They can also get help about their TelstraSuper account over the phone at no additional cost - it's part of the membership.

TelstraSuper members can access comprehensive financial advice through TelstraSuper Financial Planning.

== History ==
TelstraSuper was established in 1990 and has grown to become Australia's largest corporate super fund. The fund was initially established for the sole benefit of Telecom employees and named the Telecom Superannuation Scheme.

After being renamed the Telstra Superannuation Scheme in 1996, the fund extended its membership eligibility in 2007 to include former Telstra employees and the eligible family of existing Telstra Super members.

In December 2024, TelstraSuper announced it had signed a binding Heads of Agreement to merge with Equip Super. The fund then announced in May 2025 that this merger would not be moving forward. It signed a non-binding Memorandum of Understanding with Aware Super to explore a potential merger with the fund in July 2025.

== Structure ==
TelstraSuper operates under the direction of the TelstraSuper board of directors, led by independent Chair Anne-Marie O’Loghlin. The current chief executive officer is Chris Davies, the current chief financial officer is Paul Curtin and the current chief investment officer is Graeme Miller.

TelstraSuper membership is open to everyone. The fund currently offers 10 investment options, which have generally achieved returns above the industry median.
