= John Christensen =

John Christensen can refer to:

- John Christensen (baseball) (born 1960), American baseball player
- John Christensen (field hockey) (born 1948), New Zealand hockey player
- John Christensen (swimmer) (1915–1996), Danish swimmer

== See also ==
- Jon Christensen (musician) (1943–2020), Norwegian jazz drummer
- Jon Christensen (journalist) (active from 2012), American environmental historian, journalist, and editor
- Jon Christensen (politician) (born 1963), U.S. Representative from Nebraska
