= Hans Christensen (footballer) =

Danish footballer (1906–1992)

Personal information
- Date of birth: 7 June 1906
- Place of birth: Frederiksberg, Denmark
- Date of death: 17 May 1992 (aged 85)
- Position: Forward

International career
Years	Team	Apps	(Gls)
1934	Denmark	1	(0)

Hans Christensen (7 June 1906 – 17 May 1992) was a Danish footballer. He played in one match for the Denmark national football team in 1934.
