= Tommy Christensen =

Danish footballer (born 1961)

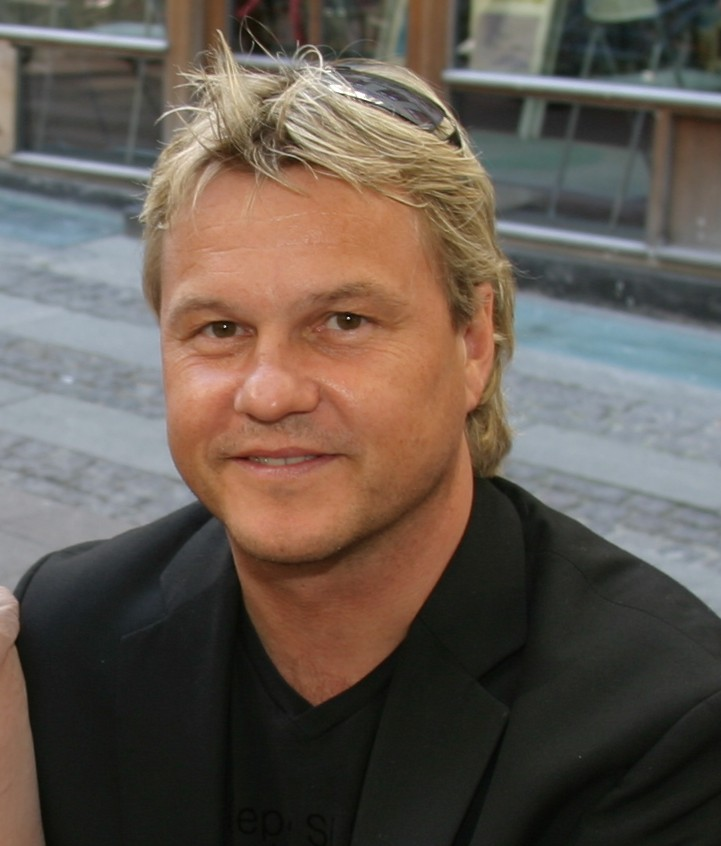

Personal information
- Full name: Tommy Anton Christensen
- Date of birth: 20 July 1961 (age 65)
- Place of birth: Hillerød, Denmark
- Height: 1.69 m (5 ft 6 1/2 in)
- Position: Forward

Senior career*
Years	Team	Apps	(Gls)
1978–1979	AGF	4	(1)
1979–1981	PSV Eindhoven	10	(1)
1982–1984	AGF	66	(35)
1984–1985	Elche CF	6	(0)
1985	Leicester City	2	(0)
1985	Portsmouth	3	(2)
1986–1987	Brøndby IF	19	(4)
1987–1988	Vejle Boldklub	20	(7)
1988–1989	Eintracht Braunschweig	22	(4)

International career
1977	Denmark U19	3	(1)
1977–1979	Denmark U21	9	(0)
1983	Denmark	1	(0)
- * Club domestic league appearances and goals

Tommy Anton Christensen (born 20 July 1961) is a Danish former footballer who played professionally for, amongst others, Elche CF in Spain, Brøndby in Denmark and Eintracht Braunschweig in Germany. He also played one game for the Denmark national football team.

== Biography ==
Born in Hillerød, Christensen got his national breakthrough when he scored two goals in his senior debut with AGF at the age of 17, and was immediately off to PSV Eindhoven in the Netherlands. After a few years of injuries at PSV, he moved back to play for AGF. While at AGF, he played his only Danish national team game in June 1983. He then moved to Elche in 1984, playing six games in the 1984–85 La Liga season. He played for English sides Leicester City and Portsmouth during the 1985–86 season, joining the clubs on one-month contracts in November and December 1985. He moved back to Denmark and played a total 32 games for Brøndby in all competitions. He then moved to rival team Vejle Boldklub, where he scored a total 10 goals in 31 games from July 1987 to June 1988. He then played 22 games and scored four goals for Braunschweig in the 1988–89 German 2. Bundesliga season. He ended his career in June 1989, having been plagued by injuries throughout his career.
