= Tom Kristensen (disambiguation) =

Tom Kristensen (born 1967) is a Danish racing driver.

Tom Kristensen may also refer to:

- Tom Kristensen (author) (born 1955), Norwegian author
- Tom Kristensen (poet) (1893–1974), Danish poet, novelist, literary critic and journalist

== See also ==
- Tom Kristensson (born 1991), Swedish rally driver
- Thomas Kristensen (disambiguation)
