= List of old boys of The King's School, Parramatta =

This list includes notable former students of the Anglican school, The King's School in North Parramatta, Sydney, Australia.

== The arts and entertainment ==
- Bruce Beresford (born 1940) – film director
- Michael Blakemore AO OBE (1928–2023) – freelance theatre and film director
- Richard Brancatisano (born 1983) – actor
- David Campbell (1915–79) – poet
- Robert Crawford (1868–1930) – poet
- John Farquharson (1929–2016) – journalist
- Charles Mackerras (1925–2010) – conductor
- John Marsden (1950–2024) – author; founder and principal of Candlebark School
- Andrew Upton (born 1966) – playwright and screenwriter; husband of Cate Blanchett

== Business ==
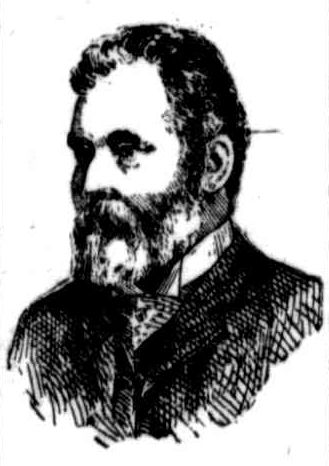
Hugh Mosman

- Hugh Mosman (1843–1909) – discovered gold in Charters Towers
- David Droga (born 1968) – Founder and chair of Droga5
- Basil Fairfax-Ross (1910–84) – Australian businessman
- Lionel Lee - Chief Executive Officer (CEO) of Bing Lee.
- Sir William Archer Gunn

== Medicine and science ==
- James Charles Cox – Physician and oncologist
- Stephen John James Frank Davies – Adjunct professor, Division of Science at Murdoch University; adjunct professor, School of Environmental Biology at Curtin University of Technology (also attended The Elms School)

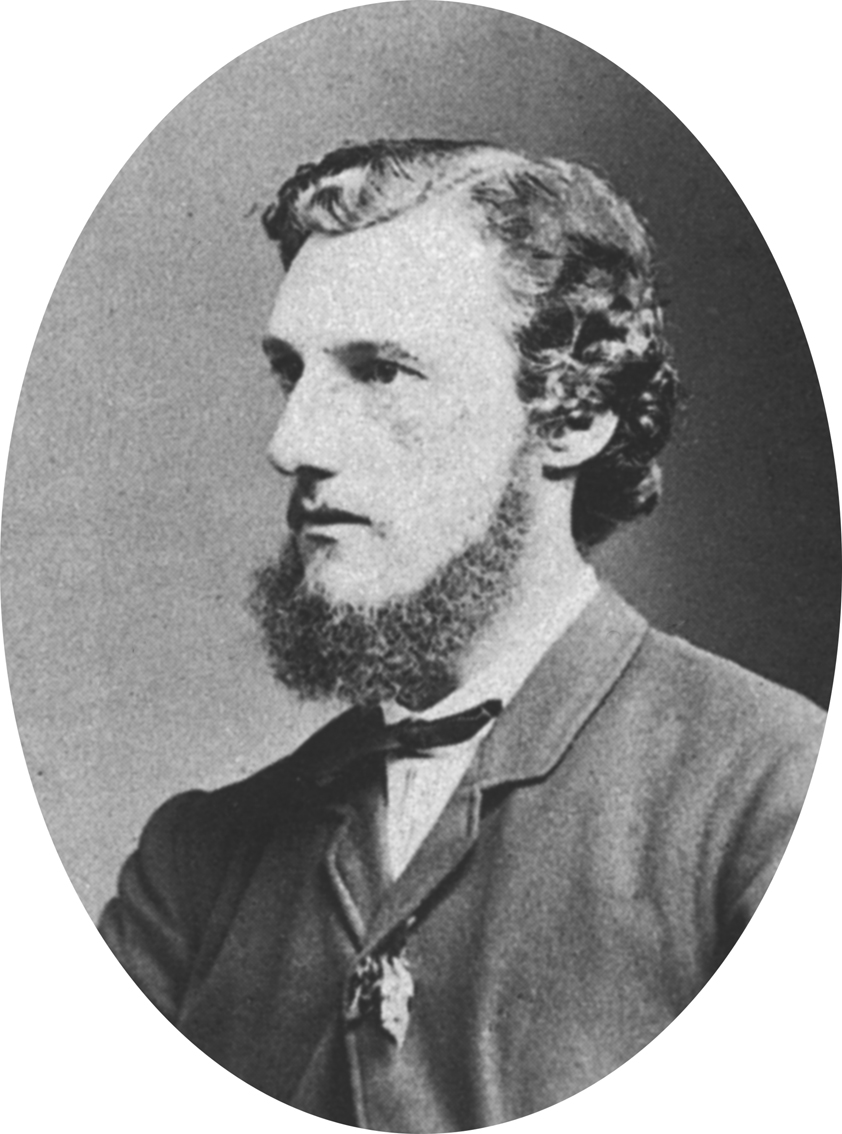
Edward Pierson Ramsay

- James W. Lance – Neurologist; specialist in headache and migraine
- Gregory Macalister Mathews CBE – Ornithologist; elected Fellow of the Royal Australasian Ornithologists Union and served as President
- Edward Pierson Ramsay – Zoologist; specialist in ornithology
- Greg Retallack (senior year 1969) – Professor of Geological Sciences, University of Oregon; specialist in paleopedology and paleobotany.
- Thomas Griffith Taylor – Pioneering geographer; physiographer; weather service's official representative on the Terra Nova Expedition; foundation head of Australia's first university geography department (also attended Sydney Grammar School)

== Military ==
- Vice Admiral Sir John Gregory Crace KBE, CB – officer of the British Royal Navy (RN); commanded the Australian–United States Support Force (Task Force 44) at the Battle of the Coral Sea
- Lieutenant John Steel ("Jock") Lewes – British Army officer and founding principal training officer of the British Special Air Service; killed in action, 1941.
- Major-General Sir Denzil Macarthur-Onslow CBE, DSO – commander of the 1st Armoured Brigade during World War II.
- Major-General Sir Granville Ryrie KCMG, CB – served in both the Second Boer War and World War I.
- Sydney Christian – Australian Army Colonel

== Politics, public service, and the law ==
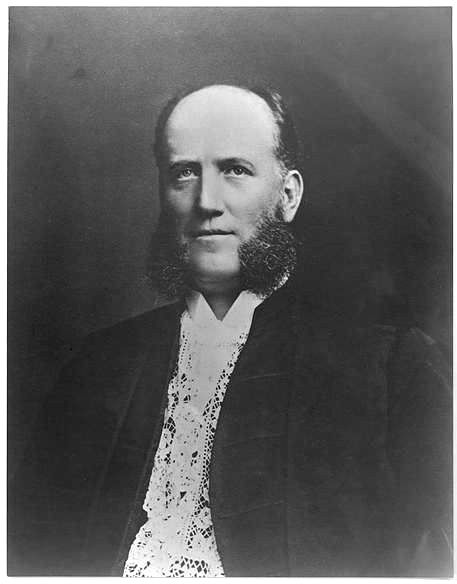
Joseph Palmer Abbott

- Sir William Archer Gunn
- Sir Joseph Palmer Abbott KB KCMG – Politician and solicitor; Commissioner of the Supreme Court of New South Wales for the district of Maitland; Elected to the New South Wales Legislative Assembly as member for Gunnedah, and later for Wentworth
- John Anderson – MHR (Nat); Deputy Prime Minister and Leader of the National Party (1999–2005)
- John Douglas Anthony AC, CH – MHR (Nat) (1957–1984); Deputy Prime Minister (1971–72) and (1975–83); Leader of the National Party (1971–84)
- Mike Baird – Former Premier of NSW
- Sir Joshua Peter Bell – Pastoralist and parliamentarian
- Sir Nigel Bowen AC KBE – Politician; Member for Parramatta (Liberal); Appointed Attorney-General of Australia in the Second Holt Ministry
- Francis Stewart Boyce – Barrister, Supreme Court judge and politician (also attended Sydney Grammar School and Rugby School)
- Arthur Chesterfield-Evans – NSW MLC (Dem) (1998–2007)
- Russell Cooper – Premier of Queensland (Sept–Dec 1989); Member of the Queensland Legislative Assembly (Nat) (1983–2001)
- Alfred Cox – New Zealand politician.
- Somerset de Chair – MP, philanderer and author
- John Ewing – Former Australian Politician
- Frederick Augustus Forbes – Store-keeper, grazier and politician; Member of the Legislative Assembly of Queensland
- William Forster – Politician; Premier of New South Wales (1859–60); Author of poetry and prose
- John Gunther – Public servant
- Hovenden Hely – Australian Explorer and politician
- Sir Joseph George Long Innes – Politician, elected to the Legislative Assembly for Mudgee; Queensland District Court judge
- Stewart Wolfe Jamieson – Official secretary at the Australian High Commission, Ottawa (1947–50); Officer-in-charge of the information and defence liaison branches, Canberra (1950–52); Consul-general in San Francisco, United States of America; Chargé d'affaires in Dublin; Australia's first high commissioner to Ghana
- Jeremy Kinross – NSW MLA (Lib) (1992–99)
- Jerome Laxale – Federal Member for Bennelong
- Sir David Maughan – Barrister; President of the Law Council of Australia
- John Frederick McDougall, Member of the Queensland Legislative Council (1860–1895)
- Sandy McPhie – Member of the Queensland Legislative Assembly for Toowoomba North (1983–1989) (Nat)
- Leon Ashton Punch – Former NSW deputy premier and minister of the crown
- Bernard Blomfield Riley – Barrister; Judge of the Federal Court of Bankruptcy; Judge of the Federal Court of Australia
- John Randall Sharp – Former National Party member of the Australian House of Representatives representing Gilmore and Hume; Business Executive
- The Hon. Keith Mason QC – former President of the NSW Court of Appeal
- John Anderson – Former Australian Politician
- Horace Berry – Former Australian Politician

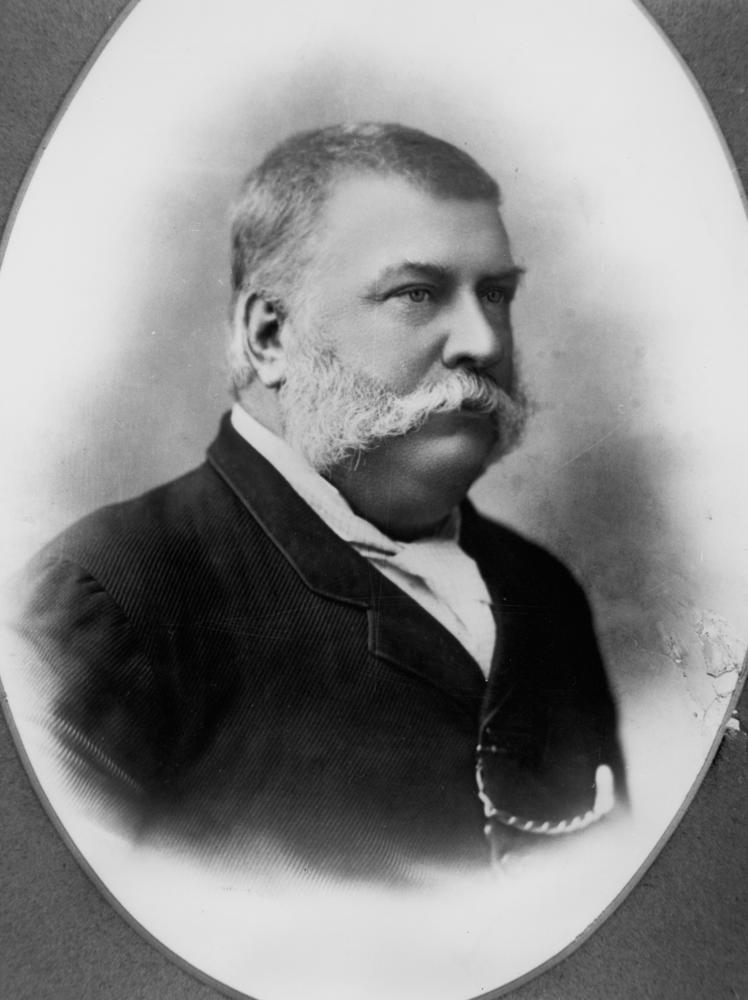
George Thorn

- Sir Francis Bathurst Suttor – Pastoralist and politician; Elected to the New South Wales Legislative Assembly for Bathurst
- Angus Taylor – Politician; Leader of the Liberal Party and Federal Member for Hume
- George Thorn – Premier of Queensland (1876–77), Member of the Queensland Legislative Assembly
- John Lloyd Waddy, OBE, DFC (1916–1987) – a senior officer and aviator in the Royal Australian Air Force (RAAF) who later served as a member of the New South Wales Legislative Assembly and Minister of the Crown.
- Sir Charles Gregory Wade KCMG – Premier of New South Wales (1907–1910); Judge (also attended All Saints College, Bathurst)
- Bret William Walker SC – Barrister; Member of the NSW Health Clinical Ethics Advisory Panel; Former President of the NSW Bar Association; Former President of the Law Council of Australia
- Sir William Charles Windeyer – Politician and judge

== Religion ==
- Geoffrey Franceys Cranswick – Anglican bishop (also attended Sydney Church of England Grammar School)
- George Cranswick – Bishop
- Percival Stacy Waddy – Anglican clergyman; Cricketer; headmaster of The King's School

== Sport ==
=== Australian football ===
- Ryan Davis

=== Athletics ===
- Nicholas Hough – winner of 110m hurdles 2010 Summer Youth Olympics.

=== Basketball ===
- Josh Green – NBA player for the Charlotte Hornets

=== Cricket ===
- Baxter Holt – Current player for Sydney Thunder and New South Wales cricket team
- Reg Bettington – Former Australian Cricketer

=== Soccer ===
- Travis Cooper – Currently playing for GHFA Spirit FC

=== Rowing ===
- John Ryrie – Australian men's eight 1912 Olympics
- Robert Waley – cox of Australian men's eight 1912 Olympics
- Robert Paver – dual Olympian, Australian men's eight 1972 and 1976 Olympics
- Samuel Loch – dual Olympian, Australian men's eight 2008 and 2012 Olympics
- Matt Ryan – Australian men's four 2008 Olympics (silver medalist) and men's eight 2012 Olympics
- Nick Hudson – Australian quad scull, silver medallist 2008 World Championships
- Cam Girdlestone – Olympic Medalist at 2016 Olympic Games
- Andrew Cox – Former Australian Coxswain
- Stuart Mackenzie – silver medallist in the single sculls at 1956 Olympics
- Alastair Gordon - silver medallist in Australian men's eight 2000 Olympics

=== Rugby league ===
- Daniel Conn – Former Rugby League player for the Gold Coast Titans
- Joseph Suaalii – Former Rugby League Player for the Sydney Roosters and current Rugby Union Player for the NSW Waratahs and Wallabies
- Will Penisini – Rugby League Player for the Parramatta Eels

=== Rugby union ===
- Saxon White - Wallabies
- Ben Batger – ACT Brumbies
- Will Caldwell – NSW Waratahs
- Mitchell Chapman – Queensland Reds, NSW Waratahs and ACT Brumbies
- Tim Davidson – Western Force, NSW Waratahs
- Daniel Halangahu – NSW Waratahs
- Ben Hand – NSW Waratahs
- James Hilgendorf – Western Force
- Julian Huxley – ACT Brumbies, Queensland Reds and Wallabies
- Nicholas Phipps – Melbourne Rebels, New South Wales Waratahs and Wallabies
- Stirling Mortlock – ACT Brumbies and Wallabies
- Dean Mumm – NSW Waratahs and Wallabies
- Benn Robinson – NSW Waratahs and Wallabies
- Jon White – Wallabies (1958–1965).
- Lalakai Foketi – NSW Waratahs and Wallabies
- Dylan Pietsch – Western Force, NSW Waratahs, Australia A, Australia National Rugby Sevens Team and Wallabies
- Charlie Cale (rugby union)– ACT Brumbies
- Tom Connor - Australia National Rugby Sevens Team
- Archer Holz – NSW Waratahs
- Joseph Sua'ali'i - NSW Waratahs
- Fergus Lee-Warner – NSW Waratahs
- Hadley Tonga-Australia National Rugby Sevens Team

=== Shooting ===
- Glenn Kable – Fijian sport shooter, competitor in the 2004, 2008, 2012 and 2016 Olympics in Men's Trap. World Cup winner 2001 Korea..

=== Tennis ===
- Rinky Hijikata – Japanese-Australian tennis player, whose career high ATP singles ranking is World No. 82. (2013–2016).

== Others ==
- Charles Cavendish – 7th Baron Chesham
- Col James (1936–2013) – architect
- Maha Vajiralongkorn – King of Thailand

== See also ==
- List of non-government schools in New South Wales
- List of boarding schools
- Athletic Association of the Great Public Schools of New South Wales
