= Burnside Public School =

Co-educational public primary school in Australia

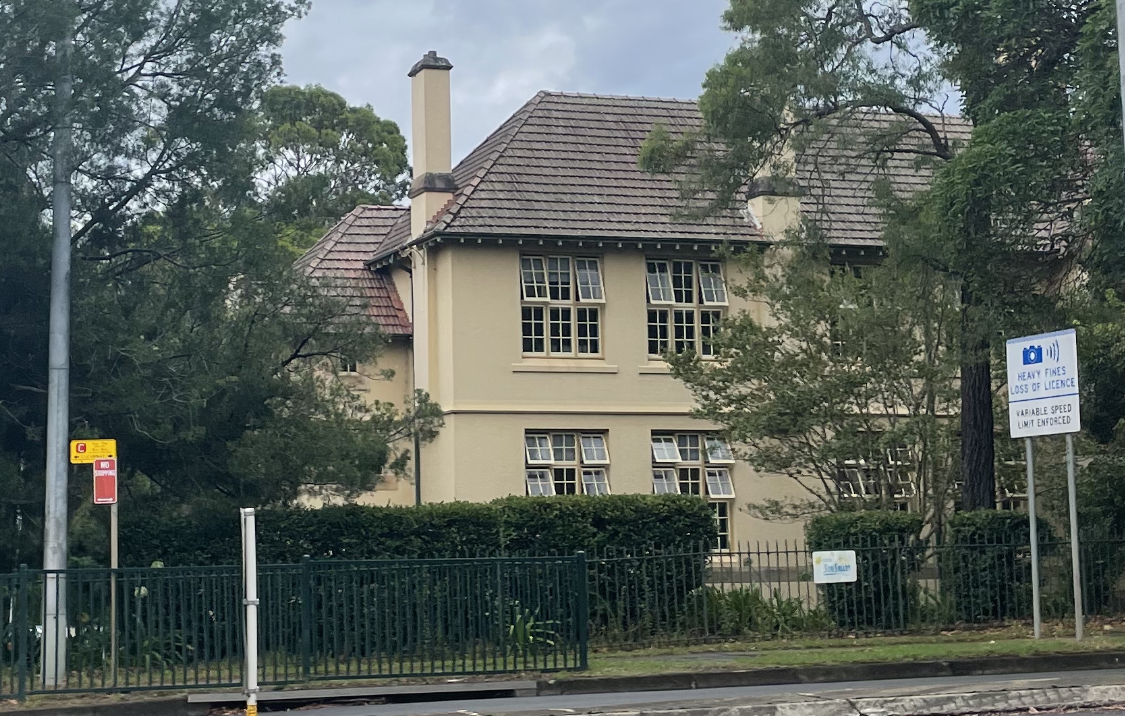
- School Building

Location
- 1 Masons Dr, North Parramatta NSW 2151; Australia
- 33.7925°S 151.0183°E

Information
- Former name: Murdoch School
- Type: Public primary school
- Motto: Omnia Pro Bono (For the good of all)
- Established: 1922
- Founder: Sir James Murdoch
- School district: North Parramatta
- School code: 1433
- Principal: Gill Bennett
- Staff: 28
- Grades: Kindergarten to Year 6
- Campus size: 2 ha
- Colors: Green and yellow
- Song: "Burnside School Song"
- Publication: Burnside Public School Newsletter
- Website: burnside-p.schools.nsw.gov.au

Burnside Public School is a co-educational public primary school in North Parramatta in the western suburbs of Sydney, Australia. The school was built and began in 1922 to aid the Burnside Presbyterian Homes (or Burnside Homes) children who walked to North Parramatta School every day. The school buildings and grounds remain the property of Uniting Care, while maintained by the NSW Department of Education.

== History ==
=== Founding ===
In 1919, there were 270 children of majority primary school age living in Burnside Homes, which was established by James Burns. Due to the distance involved in marching the students back and forth from Parramatta North School every day, an offer was made by Sir James Murdoch, chairman of the Burnside Board from 1923 to 1937, for building a school on the Burnside site (Murdoch donating the school). He contributed 18,000 pounds in total towards the school, and it was named Murdoch School for a period of time. Under the agreement that all primary age children at Burnside Homes would attend the school, the Department of Education was leased the property, and building of the school began for 17,000 pounds. The architect of the school was Gregory Nolan, the premises were designed by Howard Joseland and Glynn Gilling, and the building was built by Richard Herman Jefferay and Oswald Ernest Bartleet. With the school's strong financial backing, the school funded by Murdoch included an assembly hall, a gymnasium, a swimming pool, and dairy, flower, and vegetable gardens. The hall still exists today. On 21 April 1922, Her Excellency Lady Forster opened the school (Wife of governor general at the time, Henry Forster), which went under the name of Murdoch School for many years. Burnside was classified as a central school, accommodating students up to Intermediary levels. An extra wing was added to school in 1924, which was opened by NSW premier George Fuller on 24 March 1924.

=== After the opening ===
As Burnside Homes began to increase in size, so did Burnside Public School's enrolment, with 559 children living on the grounds in 1936 – a majority of them attending Burnside. The building was repaired and repainted in 1951. The school was reclassified from a central school in 1962, and most of the secondary students that were enrolled in Burnside were moved, and enrolled in Cumberland High School. In 1969, 540 children were enrolled at the school, 150 of which lived in the Burnside Homes. New welfare care policies introduced by the Burnside Homes, now known as UnitingCare Burnside, have led to the relocation of the children living there, and students in Burnside Public School currently are from the Burnside Homes. In the 1970s, over 400 children, separated into infant and primary students, were enrolled at Burnside. Burnside currently has over 200 students enrolled. The school celebrated its 100th anniversary in 2022.

Peter Catliffe was principal of the school from 2003 until 2015 until retiring. Gae Bromwich was principal from 2015–2022. Gill Bennett was the relieving principal of the school from 2022, and became the official principal in April 2023 after Bromwich was permanently appointed as principal of Matthew Pearce Public School. It was officially announced by an email to parents and by the weekly newsletter.

The school commemorates James Burns and James Murdoch through their sports teams, Burns and Murdoch.

== Campus ==
Burnside Public School is located at 1 Masons Drive, North Parramatta, NSW. The campus is bounded by Cumberland Highway and Masons Drive, and is sitting on 2 hectares of land. Redeemer Baptist Church is situated to the west of Burnside, and The King's School Preparatory School is to its north-east. The land Burnside resides on (which was formerly owned by James Burns) is home to a number of other educational institutions, including Redeemer Baptist School, The King's School, Tara Anglican School for Girls, Alan Walker College of Evangelism, and Uniting Theological College.

Burnside has close relations to The King's School due to their close proximity, and often use their Preparatory School grounds for school events and activities.

== Student profile ==
Students enrolled at Burnside Public School come from a wide range of economic and cultural backgrounds. As of March 2020, 1 of the 257 children enrolled were Aboriginal and/or Torre-Strait Islander, and 61% of the students in Burnside had a non-English speaking background. Students are required to wear a school uniform.

== Notable alumni ==
- Richie Benaud, a famous Australian Cricketer and cricket commentator.

== See also ==
- James Murdoch (New South Wales politician)
- James Burns (Australian shipowner)
