= Napoleon Perdis =

Australian makeup artist (born 1970)

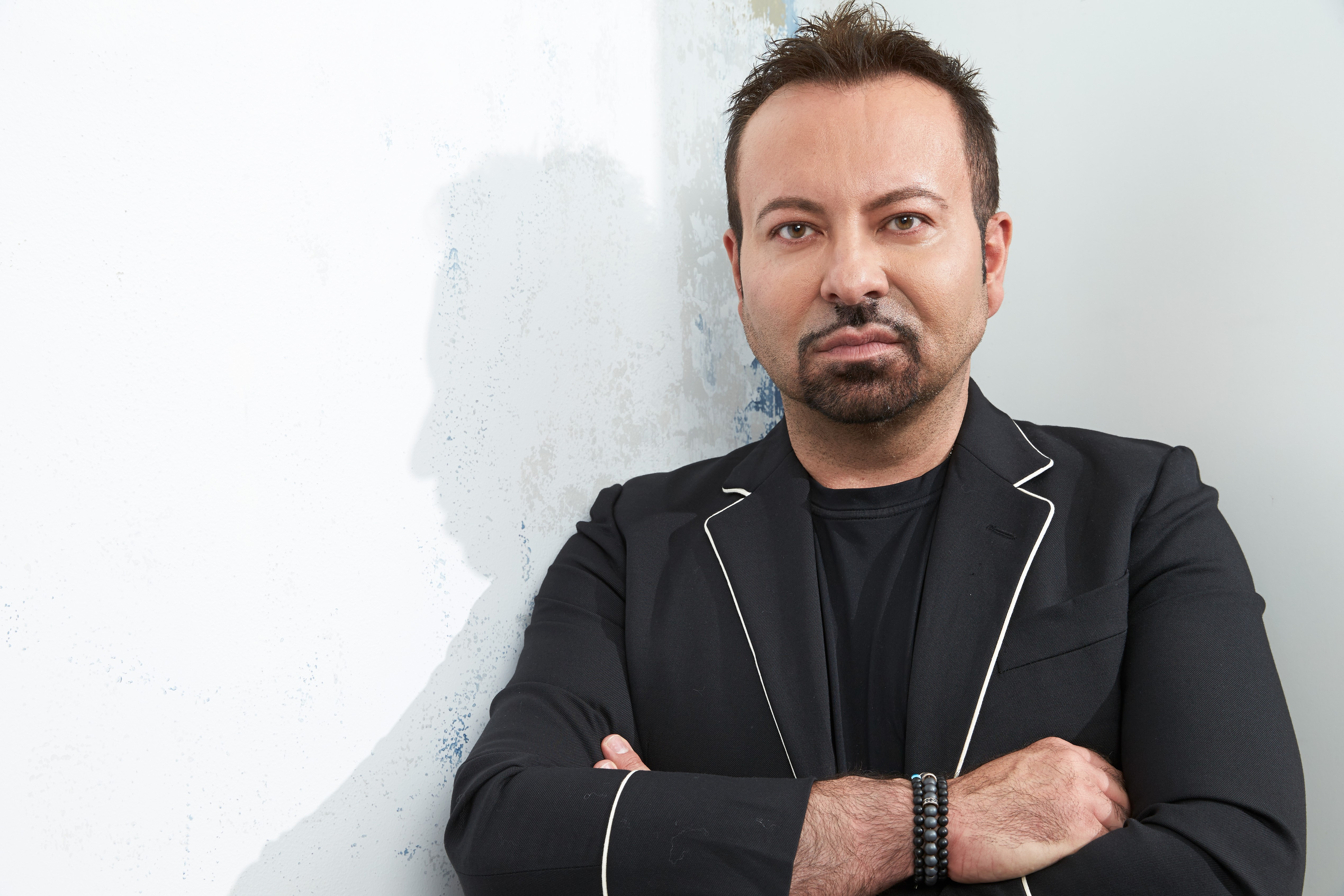
- Born: 19 March 1970 (age 55); Sydney, Australia
- Occupations: Make-up artist, businessman
- Notable work: Napoleon Perdis cosmetics line

Napoleon Perdis (born 19 March 1970) is an Australian make-up artist and businessman. Perdis launched a small makeup studio in the Sydney suburb of Leichhardt in 1992. He created a line of cosmetic products which he sold through his own store in the Sydney suburb of Paddington in 1995 and later through major department stores. By 2011, the brand operated 65 stores across Australia and New Zealand and sold its cosmetics from 4,500 locations. His business expanded to the United States with a number of stores; his products are also stocked by Bergdorf Goodman, Neiman Marcus, Saks Fifth Avenue, Nordstrom, Ulta Beauty, Target USA, Dillards, and other independent retailers throughout the country.

Perdis set up The Napoleon Perdis Makeup Academy in 1993 which provides makeup education by professional trainers for people who want to pursue a career in makeup. Perdis' business partners are his younger brother Emanuel Perdis and his wife Soula-Marie, with both of whom he co-founded his cosmetics company.

== Career ==
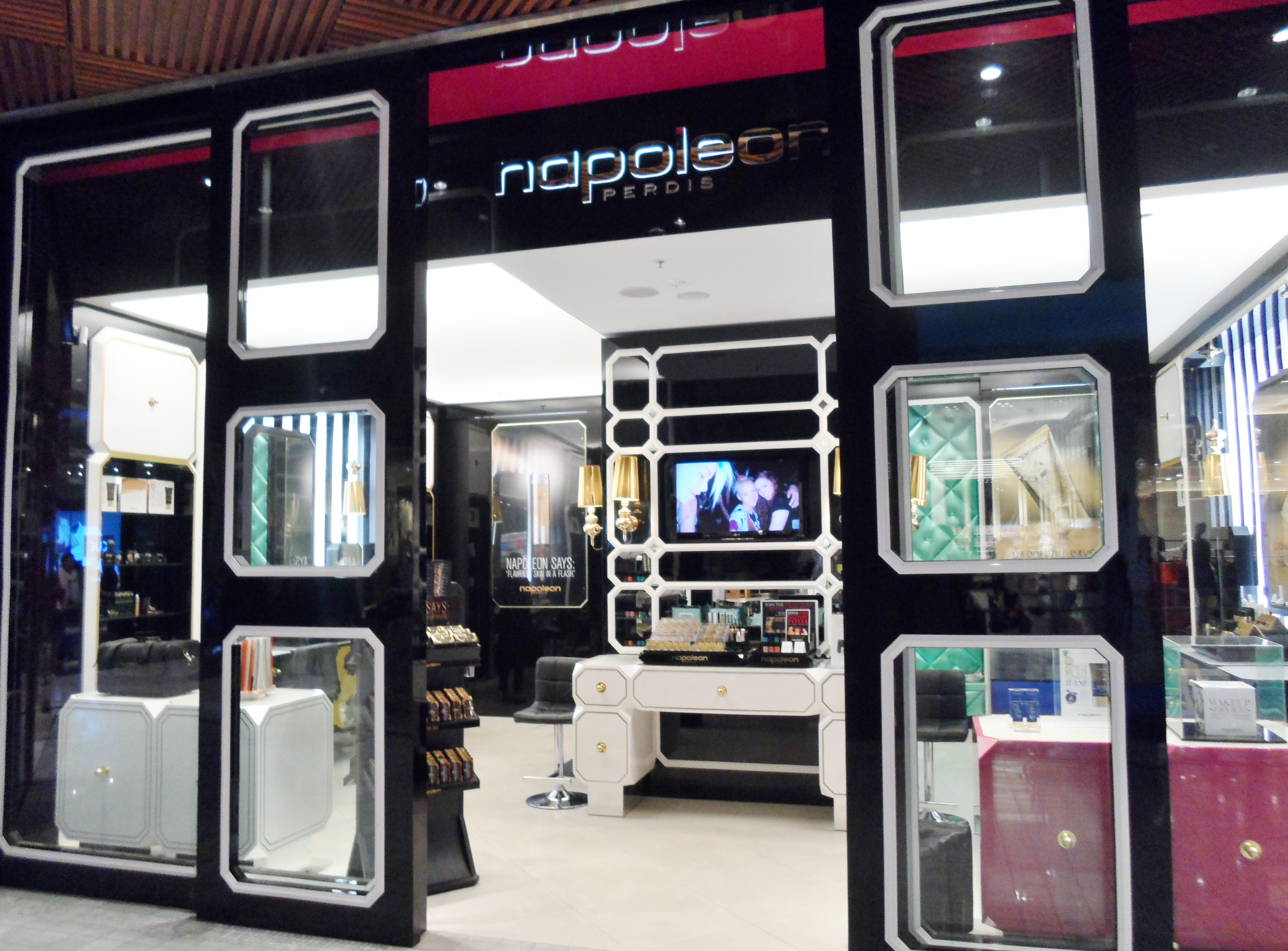
A Napoleon Perdis Concept Store in downtown Sydney

Perdis started his career as a make-up artist doing bridal make-up. In 1992, he opened his own make-up studio in a small shop in Leichhardt, New South Wales. In 1993, he won a make-up competition at a beauty expo with a look that was inspired by Cher. He won a trip to Los Angeles, where he met Cher's make-up artist and agreed to become the Australian distributor for his 'Taut' make-up products. Perdis sold the make-up to brides through his Ultimo studio and hair salons. He sold the business when he launched his own make-up products under the successive names, The Look, then The Look by Napoleon, followed with Napoleon and finally to its current Napoleon Perdis name from 1994.

Perdis opened the first Napoleon Perdis store in Paddington in 1995 with the help of a $30,000 loan from his father. His wife Soula-Mari was the company's chief financial officer and his brother Emanuel is the managing director.

Perdis made his debut on BRW's Young Rich List in 2004, with a net worth of $20 million.

In 2006, the Napoleon Perdis business expanded to the United States. Their flagship store was located in Beverly Hills, California. To reduce costs, a distribution centre was set up in Los Angeles to distribute products instead of relying on middlemen. Napoleon Perdis products was stocked in stores including Bergdorf Goodman, Neiman Marcus, Nordstrom and Dillard's, along with Target stores which carried the NP Set diffusion range. In 2015, the company pulled out completely from the country. Perdis said "The retail scene there is being driven by equity groups rather than great creative retailers who once made American department stores such fantastic places. Just doing business there, on that huge scale, was costing us millions of dollars a year, it just wasn't profitable for us."

In 2008, Napoleon Perdis launched a budget-conscious diffusion line, NP Set, which was sold in Target stores in Australia and the United States.

In 2012, Perdis opened a Napoleon Perdis Life.Style concept store in a former post office in Woollahra. The store sold home furnishings, furniture, art, jewellery and other items that reflected Perdis' tastes. A second store was opened in the Como Centre in South Yarra, Melbourne the following year.

Following the expiration of the company's five-year exclusive contract with David Jones in 2013, Perdis began stocking his products at rival department store Myer. In 2015, Perdis signed a deal with Dubai-based Luxuria Trading to distribute his products in the Middle East. In 2017, Perdis installed his then-17-year-old daughter, Lianna, as creative director of diffusion line Total Bae. In August 2018, Napoleon Perdis entered into an exclusive supply deal with the Priceline chain. The company also withdrew from David Jones due to the Priceline partnership.

In late January 2019, Napoleon Perdis went into voluntary administration. The company has 56 stores across Australia at the time, 28 of which was closed by administrators Worrells Solvency & Forensic Accountants in February 2019 as part of a right-sizing process. In April 2019, it was announced that KUBA investments would purchase Napoleon Perdis and restructure the business. In June 2019, Napoleon Perdis severed ties with Napoleon Perdis Cosmetics.

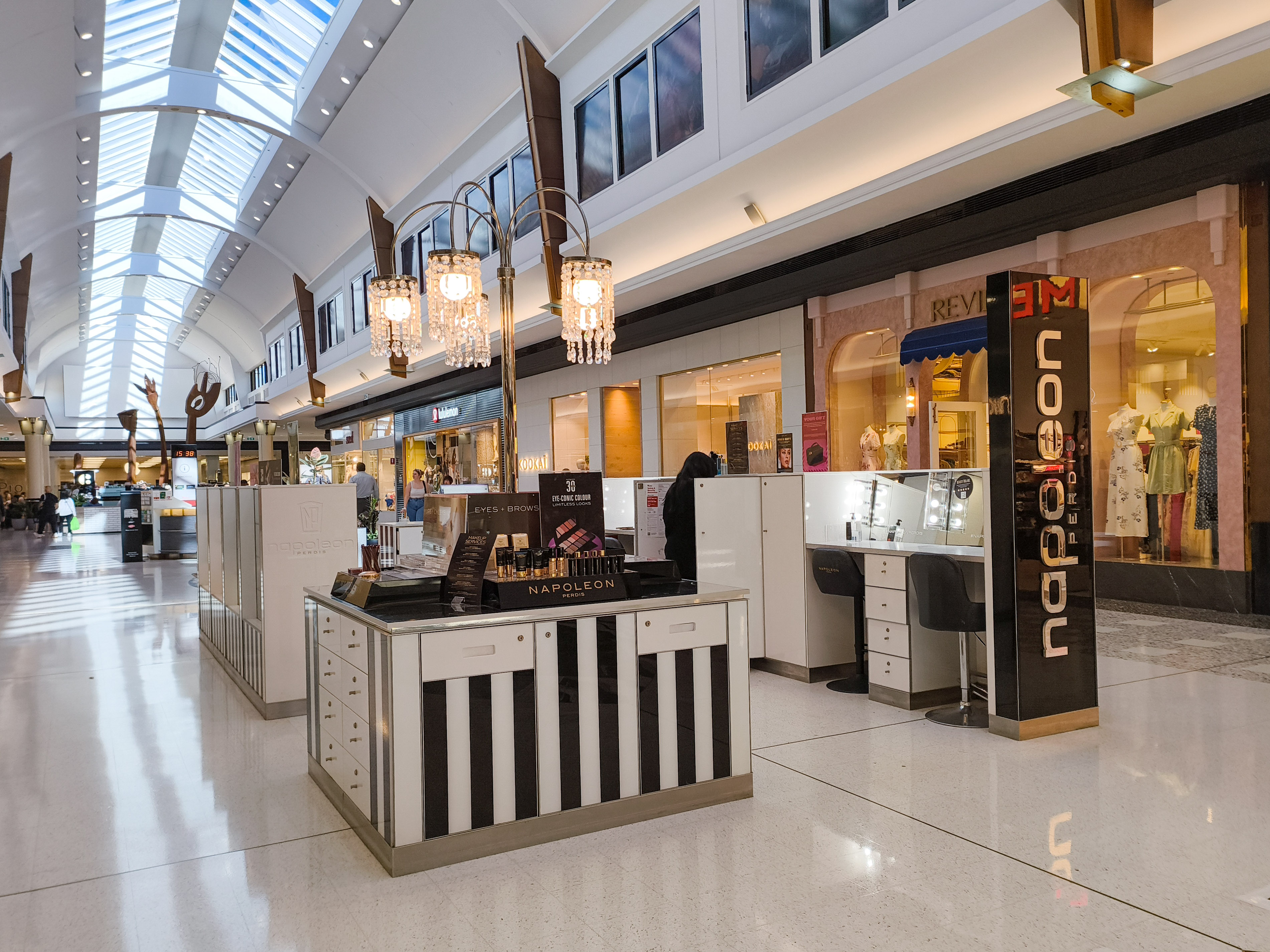
Napoleon Perdis kiosk in Westfield Booragoon

As of 2024, Napoleon Perdis remains in business and is actively trading, with 25 stores and 250 independent stockists across Australia, including in-store and mobile makeup services. Its products are also available through multiple online retailers for sale in China.

== Popular culture ==
In 2005 to 2008, Perdis appeared as a special guest on a few episodes of the reality television show Australia's Next Top Model, and the winner of the first 4 cycles became the face of Perdis's cosmetic, as part of their prizes. Australian Melissa George campaigned as the face of the Napoleon DeVine Goddess line of cosmetics in 2007.

In 2008, he starred in his own reality television show Get Your Face On, which followed him as he looked for a protégé to help the brand expand in the American market. Get Your Face On began airing in August 2008 on TLC.

== Personal life ==
Perdis was born in Sydney to John and Liana Perdis. His parents were Greek immigrants who arrived in Australia in the 1950s. Perdis went to school at Arthur Phillip High School and later at the Redeemer Baptist School. He completed a Bachelor of Arts at Macquarie University, where he met his wife Soula-Marie. They married in 1991 and have four daughters, which include triplets. He worked as a barrister's assistant while his wife was completing her actuary studies.

In 2015, Perdis and his family moved from Los Angeles to live in Athens, Greece. As of 2013, he also had homes in Los Angeles and Sydney. Perdis is a collector of owls and books. He has had lap band surgery to lose weight.
