= Julia Duin =

American journalist and author

- Born: Baltimore, Maryland, U.S.
- Education: Lewis & Clark College; Trinity School for Ministry; University of Memphis; University of Alaska Fairbanks
- Occupations: Journalist; author
- Website: www.juliaduin.com

Julia Duin is an American journalist and author who is Newsweek's religion correspondent. She has written seven books and was the religion editor for The Washington Times for 14 years. She has received three Wilbur Awards, most recently for a 2017 article in the Washington Post Magazine about Paula White, spiritual adviser to then-president Donald Trump.

== Biography ==
Duin was born in Baltimore and moved to Hawaii with her family at the age of six weeks. She attended high school in Seattle, where she began writing magazine articles.

Duin graduated from Lewis & Clark College in 1978, where she received her bachelor's degree in English. In 1992, she received her first master's degree, in religion, from Trinity School for Ministry, and in 2014 she received a second master's degree, in journalism, from the University of Memphis. For the 2014/15 academic year, she relocated to Alaska and occupied the Snedden Chair in the journalism department at the University of Alaska Fairbanks.

Duin's 2013 report for the Wall Street Journal on snake handlers. Her 2009 book, Days of Fire and Glory, tells the story of Graham Pulkingham and the Church of the Redeemer in Houston, Texas. Her first individual Wilbur Award was for a 2014 article in More about Nadia Bolz-Webber.

Duin is fluent in French, has conversational speaking ability in Spanish and German, and "speaks portions of Kurdish, Arabic, Russian and Italian." She has a daughter, who was born in Kazakhstan and adopted. She currently lives in Seattle.

== Awards ==
- 2018 Wilbur Award (Magazines National or Top 15 Markets) - "'She led Trump to Christ: The rise of the televangelist who advises the White House", Washington Post Magazine.
- 2018 Iceland Writers Retreat Alumni Award.
- 2015 Wilbur Award (Magazines National or Top 15 Markets) - "From Rebel to Reverend", More Magazine.
- 2002 Wilbur Award (Newspapers, Major Markets) - "Pulpits in Peril: The Future of America's Clergy", Washington Times (co-written with Larry Witham).

== Selected works ==
=== Books ===
- Finding Joy: A Mongolian Woman's Journey to Christ (2022), ASIN B0B79QQQT4
- In the House of the Serpent Handler (2017); University of Tennessee Press;ISBN 9781621903758
- Days of Fire and Glory (2009); Crossland Press; ISBN 9780979027970
- Quitting Church: Why the Faithful Are Fleeing and What to Do about It (2009); Baker Books; ISBN 9780801072277
- Knights, Maidens and Dragons: Six medieval tales of virtue and valor (2004); Xlibris (self-published): ISBN 9781413433715
- Purity Makes the Heart Grow Stronger: Sexuality and the Single Christian (1988); Servant Publications; ISBN 9780892833733
- Wholly Single (1988); Shaw (Harold) Publishers; ISBN 9780877889458
