= Timothy Hawkes =

Timothy Hawkes may refer to:

- Timothy Hawkes (headmaster)
- Timothy Hawkes (politician)
