= Redeemer Baptist Church =

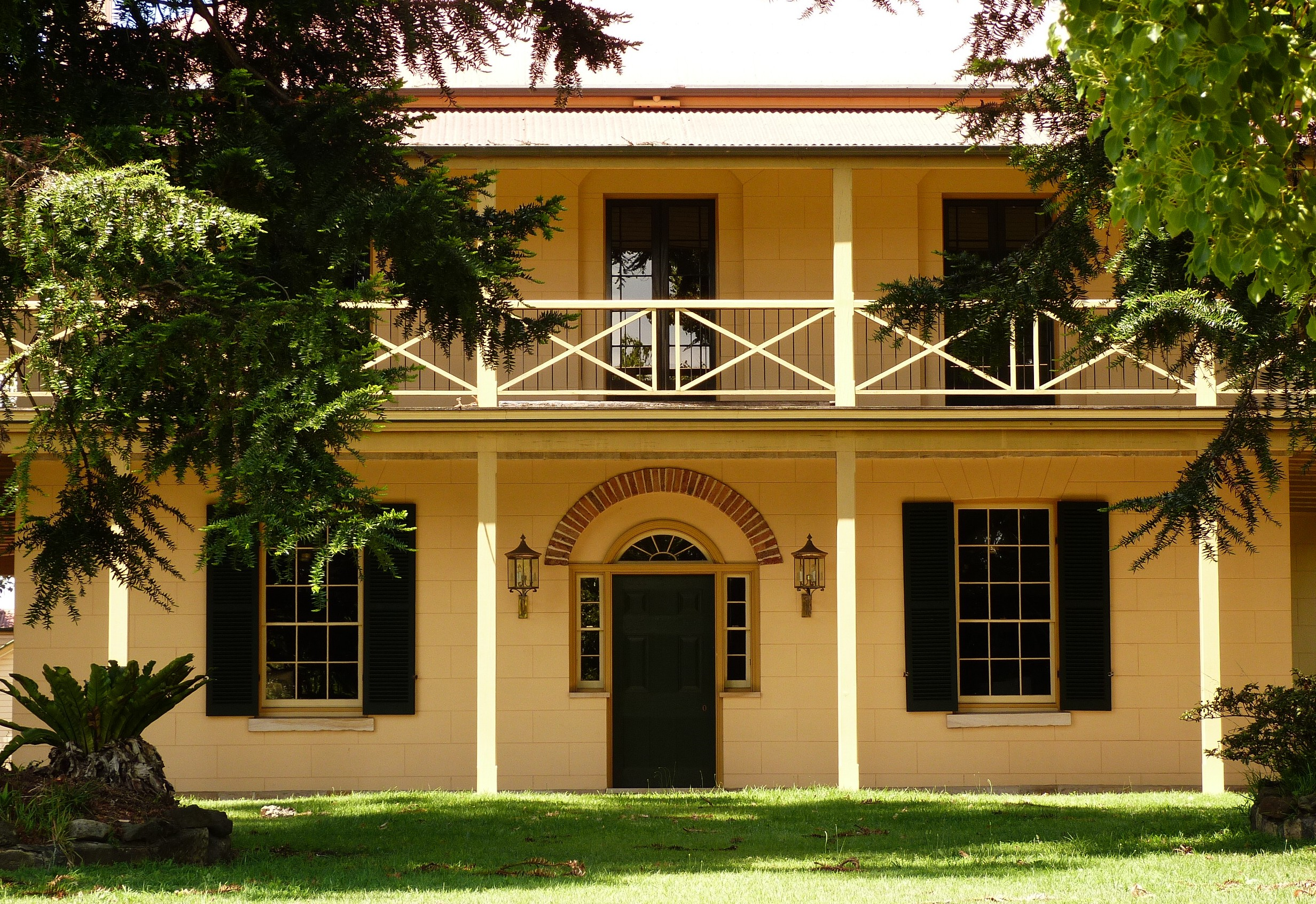
- Castle Hill House, a vocational centre run by the congregation, built c. 1844
- Redeemer Baptist Church
- 33°47′40″S 151°00′59″E
- Address: 2-12 Masons Drive, North Parramatta, Sydney, New South Wales
- Country: Australia
- Denomination: Baptist
- Website: www.redeemer.org.au

History
- Status: Church
- Founded: c. 1974

Redeemer Baptist Church is an independent Church which broke away from the Baptist Union in the late 1970s, located at 2-12 Masons Drive, North Parramatta, Sydney, New South Wales, Australia. Located adjacent to the church is the Redeemer Baptist School.

== History ==
The congregation was formed in 1974 when approximately 30 families broke away from Castle Hill Baptist Church in Castle Hill, in Sydney's Hills District, to form their own congregation. The Redeemer Baptist Church was headed for much of that time by Pastor Noel Cannon, a former science master at The King's School, Sydney.

At the time of its establishment, the doctrine of the congregation was based on the Church of the Redeemer Episcopal church in Houston, Texas.

=== Crisis ===
In 2004, 35 members of the congregation left the congregation amid claims of control by church leaders, as reported by the Nine Network. Alan Nutt, one of the original founders of the congregation, stated "I think the control has resulted over the years in very serious damage to many many lives, both young people and old people ... ." The congregation strenuously denied allegations of being a cult.

It was also reported that the Redeemer Baptist School, controlled by the Redeemer Baptist Church congregation owed 14 of their teachers A$6 million in unpaid wages. The Church congregation was mentioned in the NSW Parliament on several occasions.

Following comments made on both 20 June 2007 and 3 April 2008 in the NSW Parliament by Dr John Kaye MLC (Greens), Russel Bailey, an elder of the Redeemer Baptist Church and the bursar of Redeemer Baptist School submitted a citizen's right of reply to the Parliament to both statements by Dr Kaye.

In 2008, a settlement was reached between the school and Grahame Glossop, one of the critics of the school. Glossop stated, "I am very happy that we were able to bring the litigation between the school and myself to a final conclusion. I believe this has been a very stressful period for all concerned. It is regrettable that the relationship we once shared when my daughter attended your school has deteriorated over time. I hold no ill feeling against you the school, or any other parties related to this matter. My only concern now is to get on with my life and put the past four years behind me...I wish you and the school all the best now and into the future."

Noel Cannon died on 25 February 2012 with tribute being paid to Cannon in NSW Parliament. Cannon was succeeded by his son, Jonathan, as the principal of the Redeemer Baptist School and leader of the Redeemer Baptist Church.

== See also ==
- Redeemer Baptist School
