= The King's School, Parramatta =

School in North Parramatta, Sydney, Australia

The King's School, Australia
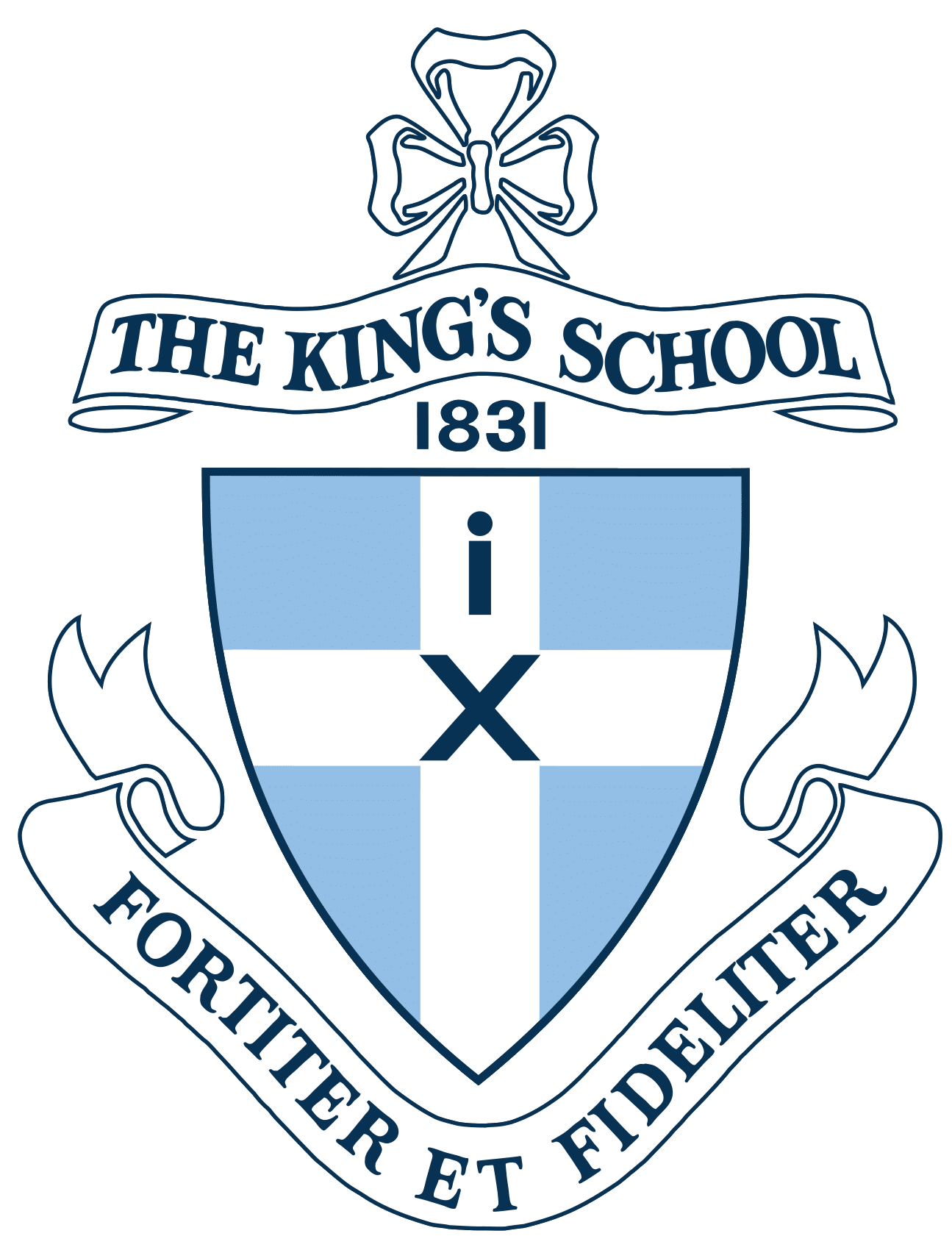

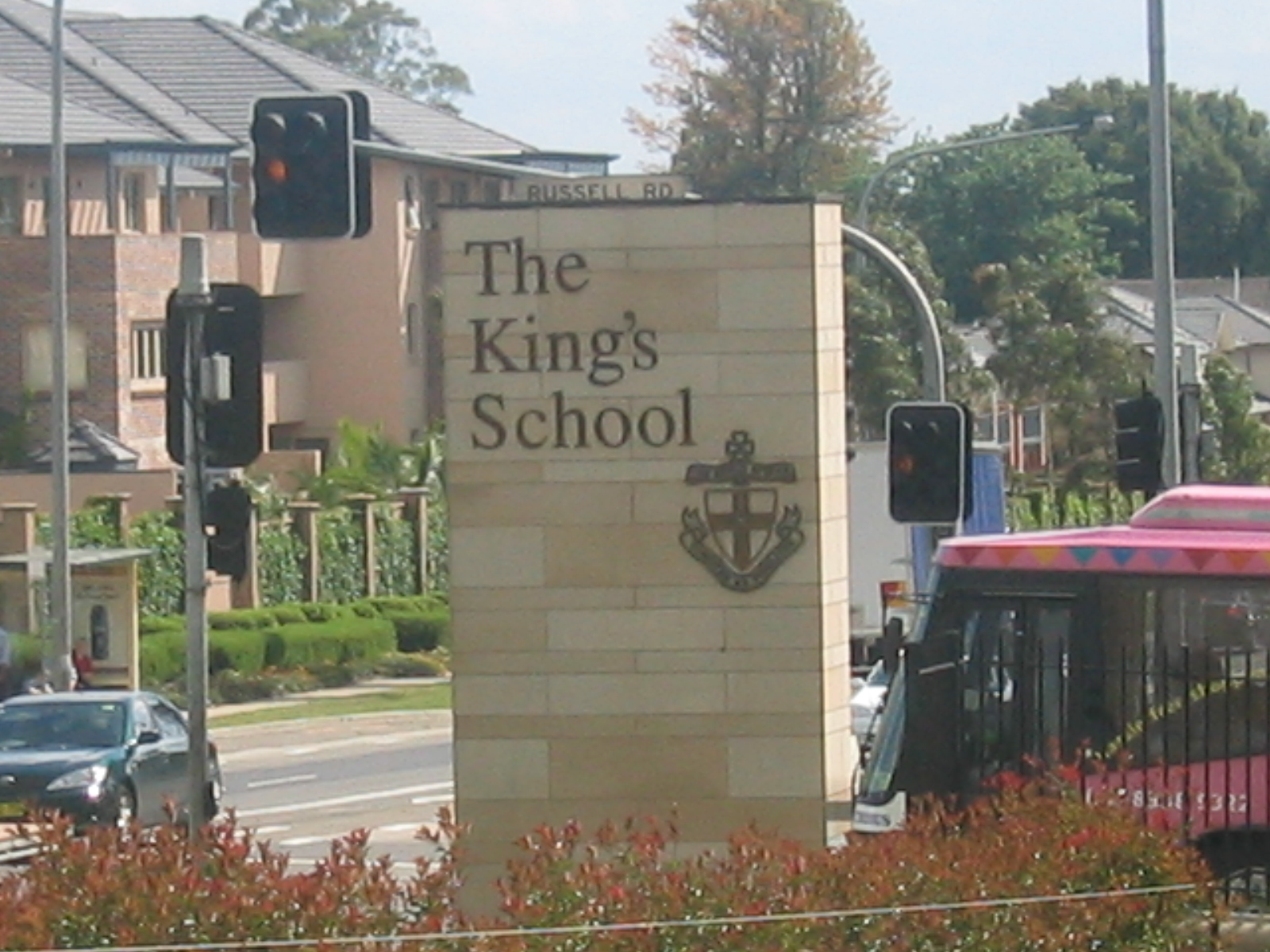
- School entrance

Location
- 87–129 Pennant Hills Road; North Parramatta, Sydney, New South Wales; Australia; 33°47′11″S 151°1′22″E

Information
- Type: Independent day and boarding
- Motto: Latin: Fortiter et Fideliter ("Bravely and Faithfully")
- Denomination: Anglican
- Established: 1831; 195 years ago
- Founder: William Grant Broughton
- Headmaster: Reverend Stephen Edwards
- Employees: 423 (2025)
- Years: Early learning and K–12
- Gender: Male
- Enrolment: ~2,150 (2025)
- Colours: Sky blue and white
- Slogan: Academic excellence with character development
- Athletics: AAGPS
- School fees: A$30,980 to A$49,980 per annum (2026)
- Affiliations: Junior School Heads Association of Australia; Headmasters' and Headmistresses' Conference; G30 Schools; Association of Heads of Independent Schools of Australia; Australian Boarding Schools' Association
- Alumni: Old Boys of the King's School, Parramatta
- Website: www.kings.edu.au

The King's School is an independent Anglican, early learning, primary and secondary day and boarding school for boys, located in North Parramatta in the western suburbs of Sydney, New South Wales, Australia. Founded in 1831, the school is Australia's oldest independent school, and is situated on a 148-hectare (1.48 km^{2}) suburban campus.

The school hosts about 2,157 students in K–12 as of 2024, and about 430 boarders from Years 5–12, making it one of the largest boarding schools in Australia. It is Australia's oldest boarding school.

The school is affiliated with the Headmasters' and Headmistresses' Conference, the Association of Heads of Independent Schools of Australia (AHISA), the Junior School Heads Association of Australia (JSHAA), and the Australian Boarding Schools' Association (ABSA). It is a G30 School and is a founding member of the Athletic Association of the Great Public Schools of New South Wales (AAGPS).

== History ==
In January 1830, the archdeacon of New South Wales, William Grant Broughton, devised a plan for the establishment of grammar schools in the colony under the governorship of Sir Ralph Darling. The Duke of Wellington assisted in securing royal patronage, the text of which stated that with the authority of King George IV such schools would be named "The King's Schools". It is said, although no documentation exists, that royal sanction was granted by King William IV. Two schools were opened in 1832: the first in Pitt Street, Sydney, the other in George Street, Parramatta, 25 kilometres (16 mi) inland. The former, opened in January, closed eight months later after the death of its first headmaster, while the Parramatta campus remained open under the stewardship of Robert Forrest, who was appointed headmaster in 1831.

The school opened on 13 February 1832, with a handful of pupils. Forrest was paid a salary of £100 per annum, but it was inclusive of a land and housing grant. From fees of £28 and £8 per annum for boarders and day pupils respectively he was expected to maintain boarders and pay the salaries of his assistants, whose fees were £4 per annum for each pupil taught. According to an article in the Australian Historical Society Journal in 1903, enrolment reached over 100 pupils before the end of the first year.

Military drill was established in 1855; in this era, the school experienced a protracted period of expansion in facilities and enrolments. The number of pupils increased to nearly 200, 150 of whom were boarders. As well as religious holidays, there were two official school holidays per year, including a mid-winter vacation from 15 June to 15 July, and a mid-summer vacation from 24 December to 31 January. In 1859 Armitage adopted school arms similar to those of The King's School Canterbury in England, which according to The King's School 1831–1981, was due to the erroneous assumption that the Australian school was named after the English one.

Headmaster LJ Trollope saw a drastic contraction in the number of pupils to just 10 by June 1864, resulting in the closure of the school.

== Campus ==
Kings School Group (former)
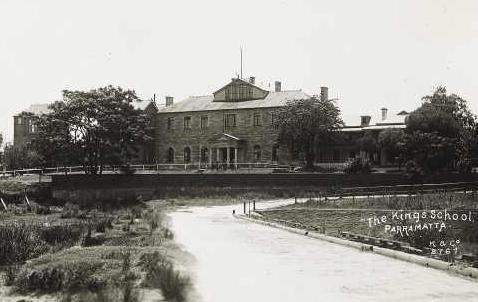
- The King's School c. 1890
- Interactive map of Kings School Group (former)
- 33°48′35″S 151°00′08″E
- Location: 3 Marist Place, Parramatta, Parramatta City Council, New South Wales, Australia

History
- Built: 1833

Site notes
- Architects: Ambrose Hallen; Blacket Brothers; Moorhouse & Isaacs; Power Adam & Munnings
- Architectural style: Georgian Revival
- Owner: NSW Department of Health

New South Wales Heritage Register
- Official name: Heritage Office Building, Marsden Rehabilitation Centre, Laurel House, Old King's School, Old Kings School
- Type: State heritage (complex / group)
- Designated: 2 April 1999
- Reference no.: 771
- Type: Education
- Category: School – Private
- Builders: C. A. Millyard; W. Noller

The King's School was originally in George Street, Parramatta, near the wharves on Parramatta River. The school soon acquired land and premises further upriver in Parramatta, close to the Government House. The school remained there for 130 years until August 1968, when it relocated to the current site in North Parramatta, originally the family residence of James Burns, co-founder of Burns Philp. Since the relocation, the school maintained a 147-hectare (360-acre) site, while other sections of property were sold to Redeemer Baptist School and Tara Anglican School for Girls, with as well as the NSW Synod of the Uniting Church as the Uniting Theological College. A further section was sold for residential development, now the locality of Kingsdene in the suburb of Carlingford. A small patch of land is still owned by Burns and his descendants, and this is for the family cemetery at the centre of the Senior School.

Within the senior school, there are extensive facilities for arts, agriculture, PDHPE, industrial design, and technology. The school theatre was renovated in 2010, adding a second smaller theatre and drama classrooms. The school opened its new science centre in 2014, which includes classrooms and labs.

Sporting facilities include 15 playing fields used for both cricket and rugby union, 14 tennis courts, 12 basketball courts, 7 football fields, a 50-metre lap pool, a 25-metre swimming pool, a diving pool, a gym, and an indoor rifle range.

== House system ==
=== Senior school ===
The Centre for Learning and Leadership, which includes a library, an auditorium, computer laboratories and classrooms

Until 2024, the school had 11 houses, for both day students and boarders. The boarding houses comprised Gowan Brae, Baker Hake, Bishop Barker Harris, Broughton Forrest, Macarthur Waddy, and the day student houses Britten, Burkitt, Dalmas, Kurrle, Macquarie and Wickham.

=== Preparatory school ===
The preparatory school has four houses, Harrison, Stiles, Thomas and Blaxland, housing students in relatively small peer groups of similar age. King's also operates a co-educational preparatory boarding school, Tudor House, in Moss Vale, which is approximately 100 kilometers south west of the North Parramatta campus.

== Uniform ==
The school uniform is the oldest military uniform still worn in Australia and is highly distinctive. The uniform reflects the military history of the school. Students are required to adapt their uniform for various events and commemorations in the course of the school year.

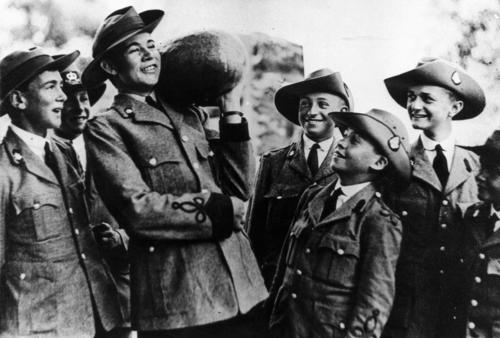
William Archer Gunn and fellow King's students in uniform, c. 1931

There are several patches and buttons which reflect rank and memberships. Historically, the school uniform was available to purchase from some department stores (David Jones, Farmers and Peapes). Students now purchase their uniforms from the school uniform shop.

== Co-curricular activities ==
Co-curricular activities offered by the school include debating, choir, theatre, bands and ensembles, sport, and the Duke of Edinburgh Award Scheme. Clubs for senior students (the Twelve Club, the Cartesian Club, the Scipionic Circle, Tom Barrett Society and the Faraday Club) meet once a month, to discuss the current affairs and present papers on topical issues.

The school produces at least one musical and two drama productions each year. Productions have included Les Misérables, The Pirates of Penzance, South Pacific, Guys and Dolls, Fiddler on the Roof, My Fair Lady, The Mikado, Grease, Jesus Christ Superstar (2015), Addams Family (2016), A Fleeting Night's Dream (2017), We Will Rock You (2018), The Producers (2019), Grease (2020), Mamma Mia (2021), School of Rock (2022) and Shrek (2023).

=== Academic clubs ===
The headmaster, deputy headmaster, and other senior staff host intellectual clubs composed of high achieving students from year 11 and 12. The members of these clubs are selected on the basis of achievement in academics, leadership and character.

=== Debating ===
The school competes with other schools' debate teams on a national and international basis. The Senior A team won the GPS on two occasions; winning outright in 1928, and tied first place with Sydney Grammar in 2007.

=== Cadet corps ===
The cadet corps's annual passing-out parade on the JS White Oval. The school chapel is in the background.

Founded in 1868, the cadet corps vies with Newington College as the oldest in Australia. All students in Years 9 and 10 are required to undergo cadet training.

=== Music ===
The program is held in the sesquicentenary music building. The school has two pipe organs: a chapel organ in the memorial chapel and a large baroque pipe organ in Futter Hall.

==== Curriculum ====
Year 7 students complete the mandatory 100-hour Board of Studies (NSW) music course, which introduces them to basic concepts of music in a variety of styles. Year 7 boys participate in a singing program and undertake a theory exam toward the end of the year. As part of the Year 8–10 elective program, students can continue to study music in these years. They are required to learn an instrument as part of this course and regular performance assessments take place. For the HSC, students can continue their music studies in either the Music 1 or Music 2 courses, with the option of choosing Music Extension as well. Music 1 and 2 cover a variety of music styles, however, the Music 2 course has a focus on Western art music. Recently the school has been successful in this field, with a number of student performances and compositions nominated for ENCORE.

==== Co-curricular program ====
The school has seven large Wind Bands, which form the core of the Wind, Brass and Percussion program. The Symphonic Band is the school's elite level band and is composed of musicians typically studying AMEB or Trinity Grade 7 and above. The Wind Orchestra is the middle ensemble within the senior school, whilst Gowan Brae Band is a special ensemble for year 7 students only, which receives extra attention and allows students to develop their talents intensively upon their arrival at King's. The marching band includes members of the Symphonic Band who are enrolled as cadets in The King's School cadet corps. In the Preparatory school, the Concert Band, Wind Ensemble and Junior Band complete the 3–12 wind bands program. The school also runs three stage bands, and numerous other jazz and chamber ensembles for Wind and Brass players. The King's School is particularly renowned for its 'Drumline', a percussion ensemble in the American tradition in which outstanding percussion students perform memorised precision drumming routines, in military-style formation.

The school has a chamber string orchestra for experienced players.

There is a non-auditioned choir for boys in the senior school, and the auditioned Schola Cantorum; both ensembles are in four vocal parts. In the preparatory school there are three choirs consisting of trebles and altos.

A number of small ensembles exist including piano trios, guitar ensembles, percussion ensembles, flute ensembles, clarinet quartet, saxophone quintet and a number of popular music bands.

==== Regular concerts and events ====
The Music Department conducts a number of regular events each year, including the annual Festival of Lessons and Carols, Gala Concert, ensembles concerts, and studio recitals for individual performances. Most events are held in either the Recital Room (part of the Sesquicentenary music building) or Futter Hall.

=== Sport ===
Sport is compulsory for all students. Senior school students must participate in one of rugby union, association football, volleyball or cross country in winter, and rowing, cricket, basketball, tennis, athletics or swimming in summer. If personally selected by the sportsmaster, students may represent the school at shooting outside their regular sporting commitments. Students may participate in a sport in which they have achieved excellence (deemed by the sportsmaster). Cricket, rugby union, association football, basketball and tennis is also available at the preparatory school. The school engages in these sports as a member of the Athletic Association of the Great Public Schools of New South Wales) with other schools: Saint Ignatius' College, St Joseph's College, Sydney Boys High School, Sydney Grammar School, Sydney Church of England Grammar School (Shore), Newington College, The Scots College and The Armidale School.

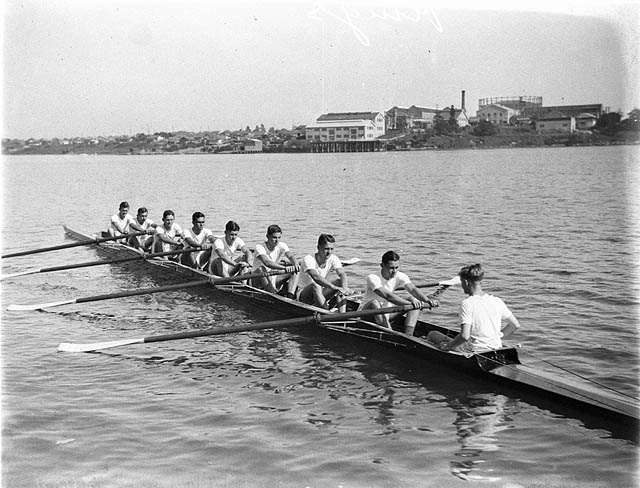
King's School eight-oar crew, 1932

==== Rugby union ====
The rugby union 1st XV has won several GPS Premierships in recent years, including in 2018, 2020 and 2023. The team won the 2000 Sanix World Rugby Youth Tournament in Japan.

Under the coaching of William Robert 'Gurry' Burkitt (Master, TKS 1868-1885) the school was instrumental in the early development of rugby union in Australia, providing many players to the Wallaroo FC, playing in the first inter-school game against Newington College in 1870 and was involved in the 1874 founding of the NSWRU. In 1880 members of the school rugby team also participated in the first recorded soccer match in Sydney against the Wanderers Club. King's old boy Charles Gregory Wade played eights times for England while studying at Oxford University in the mid 1880s. On their 1888 tour of New Zealand and Australia, the British and Irish Lions drew against a team from the school at Parramatta.

The school has produced 30 Wallabies and four of them have been captains. Current and recent Wallabies Stirling Mortlock, Benn Robinson, Dean Mumm, Lalakai Foketi, Nick Phipps and Julian Huxley are former students of the school. Other former students including Teddy Wilson, Archer Holz, Ben Batger, Daniel Halangahu, Will Caldwell, James Hilgendorf, Ben Hand, Tom Carter, Mitchell Chapman, Hugh Perrett, Guy Millar and Tim Davidson play or played recently in the Super Rugby competition. Greg Jeloudev and Dylan Pietsch play for Australia in the World Rugby Sevens Series. Joseph Sua'ali'i plays rugby league for the Sydney Roosters in the NRL and has signed to play for the Waratahs.

==== Rowing ====
In rowing, the school has won the GPS Head of the River 19 times, including in 2021 and 2022, and the Schoolboy VIII at the National Rowing Championships in 1982, 2001, and 2006. The school won the Princess Elizabeth Challenge Cup at the Henley Royal Regatta in 2001 and the Fawley Challenge Cup in 2006.

== Filming location ==
The junior boarding house 'Gowan Brae' was used as a filming location in the 2013 adaptation of The Great Gatsby movie. The boarding house was the Louisville home where the younger Gatsby meets Daisy before the war.

== Controversy ==
=== Alan Jones ===
In 1970, the talkback host was appointed Senior English Master and proved a very successful sports coach. He was a divisive figure, however, and was accused of inappropriate favoritism. In 1975, following a meeting with the school's principal, Jones submitted his resignation.

=== Bullying and sexual misconduct ===
In 2010, a former student sued the school after he alleged that he was subjected to sexual assaults and daily beatings by fellow students. Two decades after the incidents, the former student is in institutional care, suffering from a psychiatric illness that he claims is caused by the negligence of the school. The school denied the allegations.

In 2014, students filmed and uploaded an incident where a student rubbed their genitals on another boy's face. The Child Abuse Squad investigated the incident and a student was expelled.

In 2016, the Royal Commission into Institutional Responses to Child Sexual Abuse found that the school had helped an alleged abuser move to another private school by withdrawing from the school rather than being expelled or suspended, making it easier to transfer to another school. The royal commission found that the alleged abuser had ejaculated onto the victim's sleeping bag during a school camp which led to months of bullying and the school had not reported the incident to the police. The headmaster, Timothy Hawkes, had told the parents of the victim that the boy "bore some of the blame" for subsequent bullying.

That same year, at a Royal Commission Hearing, a man came forward about how he was sexually abused, assaulted, bullied, and choked in the 1970s. The witness, who was 11 years old at the time, said he was abused in the first week he arrived at the school, and called homophobic slurs for the rest of his time at school. He said the teachers at the school turned a blind eye to the abuse, and one even sought to blame him for his predicament. Another man, who was sexually abused at the King's School in the 1960s, spoke at the hearing saying he was rebuffed by former headmaster Timothy Hawkes when he confronted the school authorities in 2002, as Hawkes was concerned for the school’s image if the controversy reached the media.

In September 2026, following allegations against teenage boys at schools like Scots College, Stephen Edwards urged students to conduct an audit of their behaviour and to consider how they speak to their 'mothers and sisters', with parents urged to discuss consent with their children.

=== Animal cruelty ===
In 2016, the Australian Broadcasting Corporation obtained footage of the school's rugby team crash-tackling sheep in a farm paddock. The headmaster at the time, Timothy Hawkes, defended the incident, stating that it was a "rugby camp training exercise not dissimilar to shearing". RSPCA Australia attended the school to investigate the incident.

On 29 March 2023, near the start of the annual Cadet Corps Camp (held at Singleton Military Base in Hunter Valley), a group of students killed a tree goanna, which was reported to the police on 5 April 2023. The school spokesperson confirmed the incident, and that it was "inconsistent with the values and expectations" at King's". The headmaster, Tony George, later stated in a volunteered interview with 2GB that "there was realm of possibility" the animal wasn't tortured by the students but the allegation was enough for a police investigation – anyone found guilty of aggravated animal cruelty in Australia can face up to 2 years in prison, or fines of up to $22,000. George later released a public response which reiterated many of the points made in the interview, repeating his disgust for the "tabloids and virtuous trolls" using the controversy for clickbait.

=== COVID-19 ===
In October 2021, the school was the only school in NSW to refuse a mask mandate during the COVID-19 pandemic. The headmaster Tony George stated that "NSW Education Department guidelines are primarily intended for NSW public schools", but as the school is independent, it only had a legal obligation to follow public health orders.

=== Jobkeeper ===
The school was critcised for claiming the JobKeeper subsidy, handed out by the government during the COVID-19 pandemic to help protect jobs. The private school claimed $8m in JobKeeper subsidies, despite delivering a surplus without the subsidy, largely due to high school fees.

=== School spending ===
In 2022, the school came under scrutiny over the school's spending and lack of transparency, after it approved a trip to fly business class for the school's headmaster Tony George, deputy and both of their wives to fly to watch the King's First VIII race in the Princess Elizabeth Challenge Cup. It was later revealed that the school had also approved a plan to build a plunge pool for the headmaster's residence. The business class flights were forced to be repaid after an investigation revealed that it breached the Education Act, and was an improper use of funds.

=== Group chats ===
In March 2010, a student posted racist comments about Aboriginal Australians onto Facebook, with other students replying to the comment expressing support. The school took down the comments and the students were made to write essays explaining why their comments were offensive.

In April 2023, students were found to have sent racist and antisemitic messages on a private online group chat named "Studies of Religion" on WhatsApp and Instagram in September 2022. A spokesperson for The King's School stated that immediate action took place as soon as the school was made aware of the incident.

=== Other controversies ===
In 2018, the principals of 34 Sydney Anglican diocese schools, including Kings, wrote to Prime Minister Scott Morrison opposing the overhaul of anti-discrimination laws that would protect gay teachers. The letter argued that the current exemptions under the Sex Discrimination Act are the only significant legal protections faith-based schools have to employ staff who support their ethos. The letter warned of unintended consequences if the exemptions were removed and called for religious freedom to be codified in legislation.

In 2019, the school faced backlash after students were caught plagiarising on an assessment task on Shakespeare's Richard III, with the school deciding against punishment for the students because "the individual cannot be held to account for a matter reflective of a cultural or systemic issue". Later, Headmaster at the time Tony George stated he was "disappointed", and later the students were investigated privately "penalised accordingly".

In 2026, outgoing headmaster Tony George initiated legal action against the school following his dismissal for allegedly clipping a student over the head during a biblical studies lecture in Futter Hall in late December 2025, attended by 100 parents, after initially taking leave for "shingles". The dispute was settled outside of court for an undisclosed amount. A petition on Change.org started by "concerned parents" called for the reinstatement of the headmaster and transparency from the schools' council regarding his dismissal, reaching 236 signatures. An opposing petition called for a "street party" following his dismissal, reaching 135 signatures. George was succeeded by Reverend Stephen Edwards as headmaster of the school.

== See also ==
- Old King's School, Parramatta
- List of non-government schools in New South Wales
- List of boarding schools in Australia
- GPS Schools
- Tudor House School
- G30 Schools
