= Get Your Face On =

- Also known as: Get Your Face on with Napoleon Perdis
- Genre: Reality television
- No. of seasons: 1
- No. of episodes: 10

Production
- Executive producers: Napoleon Perdis; Kathleen French; Douglas Ross
- Producer: Jill Garelick
- Production companies: Evolution Film & Tape

Original release
- Network: TLC
- Release: 8 December – 19 December 2008

Get Your Face On is a reality show on TLC. It aired for ten episodes, beginning in December 2008.

The show is about a group of make-up artists from the greater Los Angeles area competing to become the protégé of Napoleon Perdis.
