= John Farquharson (journalist) =

Australian journalist (1929–2016)

- Born: John Mayo Farquharson; 7 September 1929; Wollongong, New South Wales, Australia
- Died: 29 June 2016 (aged 86)
- Occupation: Journalist
- Spouse: Celia Coffey (m. 1963–2016)

John Mayo Farquharson (7 September 1929 – 29 June 2016) was an Australian journalist. He worked for 22 years with The Canberra Times, from 1966 to 1988.

== Life and career ==
From 1942 to 1947 Farquharson attended The King's School, Parramatta. He got his first newspaper job in 1948, with The Cumberland Argus and Fruitgrowers' Advocate. He was responsible for covering local government and football, and for visiting the stockyard for the market report.

Farquharson moved to the Australian Capital Territory in 1952, to work in the Canberra Press Gallery as a parliamentary reporter.

In 1956 Farquharson ventured overseas as a member of the Moral Re-Armament movement.

From 1965 to 1966 Farquharson lived in Papua New Guinea and worked as editor of the South Pacific Post. His first child was born while he and his wife were resident in Port Moresby. In 1966 Farquharson and his family returned to Canberra and he took up an appointment as senior sub-editor of The Canberra Times. He was news editor from 1969 until 1975, when he was appointed assistant editor. He was later promoted to deputy editor and in 1985 was appointed editorial manager.

In 1988 Farquharson worked as a staffer for politician Wal Fife.

Farquharson had a long history of association with the Australian Dictionary of Biography. He allowed the National Centre of Biography to publish a collection of his obituaries as part of the pilot stage of the Obituaries Australia project.

Farquharson died on 29 June 2016.
