= Graham Pulkingham =

The Reverend W. Graham Pulkingham (September 14, 1926 – April 16, 1993) was the rector at the Church of the Redeemer in Houston, Texas, U.S.A., from 1963 until 1975. He and his wife Betty began the developments that led to the founding of the Community of Celebration and the worship band The Fisherfolk. He wrote several influential books including They Left Their Nets, and spoke worldwide at meetings and conferences.

== Birth, childhood and education ==
W. Graham Pulkingham was born on September 14, 1926, in Alliance, Ohio, and brought up in Hamilton, Ontario, Canada. Initially raised Catholic, he pursued graduate studies in music at the University of Texas and later received his training for the Episcopal priesthood at the Seminary of the Southwest in Austin, Texas. He graduated in 1956 after having served in the U. S. Navy during the Korean War.

== Building up a run-down church in Houston ==
In September 1963, Graham Pulkingham took over as rector of the Church of the Redeemer in Eastwood, a Houston suburb. Few people attended, and there was a sense of terminal decay. All this changed in August 1964 when Pulkingham drove to New York to seek counsel of David Wilkerson, whose book "The Cross and the Switchblade" had made him famous. Pulkingham's original intent was to ask Wilkerson's advice on ministering to drug-addicted youth but Wilkerson discerned that Pulkingham lacked the necessary spiritual power to change his church, much less the surrounding neighborhood. Wilkerson prayed over Pulkingham to be "baptized in the Holy Spirit," a post-conversion experience mentioned several times in the New Testament Book of the Acts of the Apostles. This experience transformed Pulkingham and he returned to Houston a changed man. Pulkingham began preaching dynamic sermons, people started getting miraculously healed at Redeemer's altar and visitors began pouring in. By 1966, a group of five elders had formed including Graham, a Methodist layman called Ladd Fields, Galveston attorney Jerry Barker, a local physician known as Dr. Bob Eckert and John Grimmet, a foreman at Houston Lighting and Power. The elders began inviting people - many of them trying to get off drugs - to live with them, unintentionally starting a community household experiment that eventually included nearly 400 people in 40 households. By 1972, the average weekly attendance figure had reached 2,200 and Sunday morning attendance alone was 900-1000 people. In September 1972, Pulkingham relocated 27 church members including himself and his family to Coventry, England to start a community there and his assistant, Jeff Schiffmayer, eventually replaced him as rector. Pulkingham returned to Redeemer for a brief stint from 1980-1982, returned to the UK, then relocated his community to Aliquippa, Pa. in 1985.

Jeff Schiffmayer resigned in 1983 to start a mission church in College Station, Texas. He was succeeded by Ladd Fields, one of the five original elders of Redeemer during its heyday in the 1960s. Fields was succeeded in 1994 by Steve Capper, an Episcopal priest from Indianapolis. Redeemer had several more rectors over the years as its membership declined. Unable to carry out extensive repairs needed on the building, it closed in late February 2011 with a congregation of 70. However, while the physical church building closed its doors, the congregation continues to worship and minister to the community. They are currently sharing a worship space with a nearby Lutheran church.

== International ministry ==
The work at Houston became widely known through speaking engagements and publications. Out of this grew a developing international ministry of praise and worship, community living, music, and a worldwide teaching and preaching role for Graham Pulkingham throughout the 1970s and 1980s. He was influential in South Africa, Australia and New Zealand between 1970 and 1975, encouraging Christians there to recognise their part in the worldwide renewal of the time.

== Leading figure in the charismatic movement ==
He was one of a number of key people involved in the early days of the Charismatic movement, writing a number of books, recording teaching cassettes, and speaking at many international events. In 1975, Graham Pulkingham moved to Scotland where he set up a community at the Cathedral of the Isles in Millport on the Isle of Cumbrae. The Community of Celebration begun by him and his wife is still in existence in Aliquippa, Pennsylvania. and in the United Kingdom.

== Personal life ==
Pulkingham was married to Episcopal composer Betty. In September 1992, he was suspended temporarily from the priesthood after admitting he had a sexual affair with a man, whose wife said the relationship destroyed their marriage. Pulkingham admitted to several gay involvements over a period of 20 years, some of which had been with men that he had been counselling. He stated that he had been "tormented" by homosexual attraction since his teenage years.

== Death ==
On April 1, 1993, while Pulkingham and his wife were shopping in a Winn-Dixie Supermarket in Burlington, North Carolina, a gunman fired upon store employees, killing one person. During that attack Pulkingham suffered a heart attack and died following complications on April 16, 1993.

== Bibliography ==
Books published by Graham Pulkingham include the following:

- Pulkingham, W Graham: "Gathered for power". New York, Morehouse-Barlow Co. 1972. ISBN 0-8192-1130-3
- Pulkingham, W Graham: "They Left Their Nets: A Vision for Community Ministry". Hodder and Stoughton Limited, 1974. ISBN 0-340-18553-8
- Pulkingham, Graham, Hinton; Jeanne: "Renewal: an emerging pattern". Celebration Publications, 1980. ISBN 0-906309-10-7

Author Julia Duin has written a book on Pulkingham and the Church of the Redeemer:

- Duin, Jula: "Days of Fire and Glory: The Rise and Fall of a Charismatic Community", Crossland Press, 2009. ISBN 978-0979027970
