= Bill Mumm =

Bill Mumm OBE JP
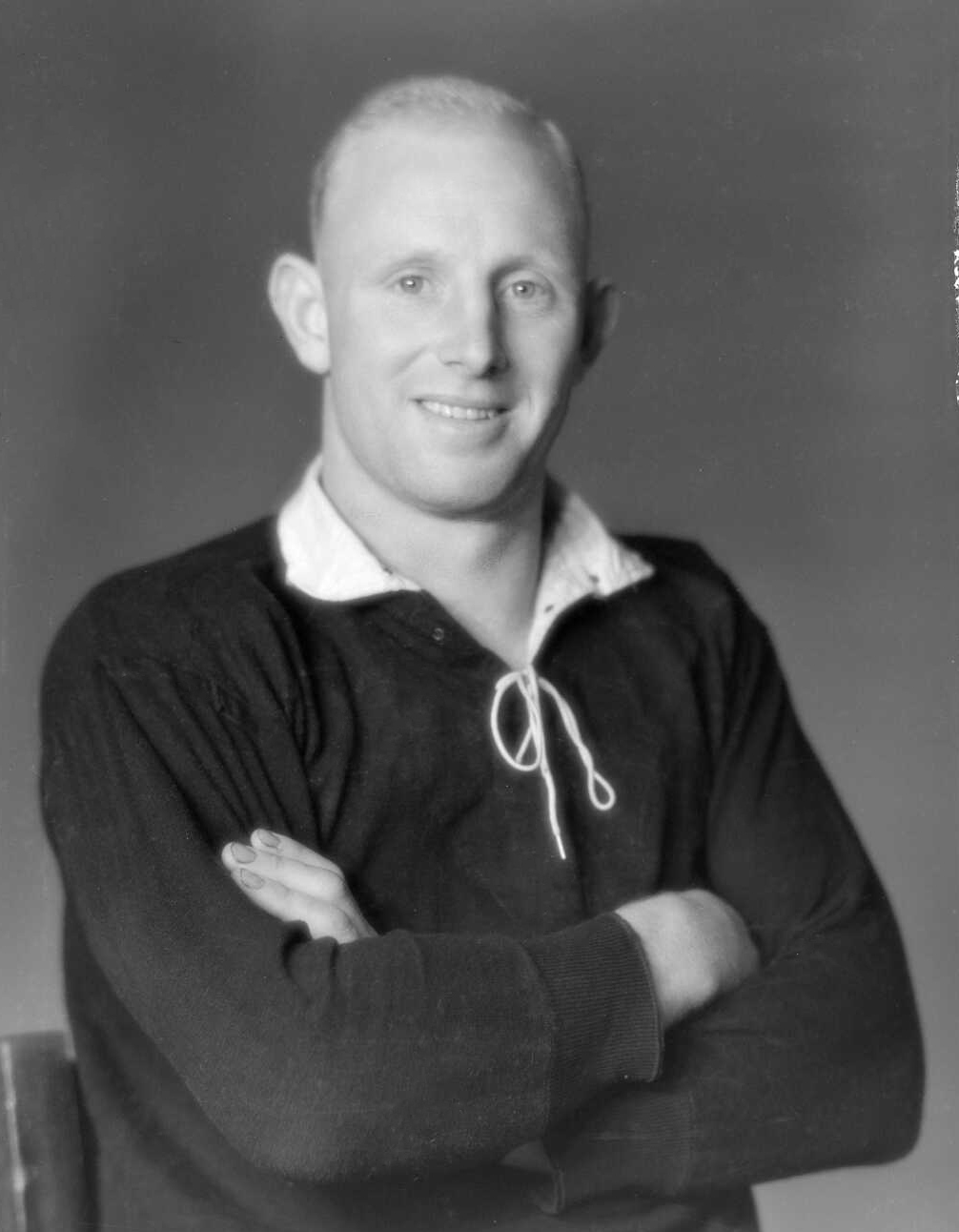
- Mumm in 1949
- Born: William John Mumm; 26 March 1922 Mokihinui, New Zealand
- Died: 11 December 1993 (aged 71) Westport, New Zealand
- Height: 1.78 m (5 ft 10 in)
- Weight: 90 kg (200 lb)
- School: Summerlea Primary School
- Notable relative: Dean Mumm (grandson)
- Occupation: Sawmiller

Rugby union career
- Position: Prop
Provincial / State sides
Years	Team	Apps	(Points)
1942–55	Buller	85	
International career
Years	Team	Apps	(Points)
1949	New Zealand	1	(0)

William John Mumm OBE JP (26 March 1922 – 11 December 1993) was a New Zealand rugby union player. A prop, Mumm represented Buller at a provincial level.

He was selected as one of the 5 players of the year for the 1945 season in the Rugby Almananac of New Zealand.

He was a member of the New Zealand national side, the All Blacks, in 1949, playing one test match against Australia.

He later served as chairman of the Buller County Council and was appointed an Officer of the Order of the British Empire in the 1990 Queen's Birthday Honours, for services to local government.
