= James Burns (Australian shipowner) =

Australian businessman (1846–1923)

Sir James Burns
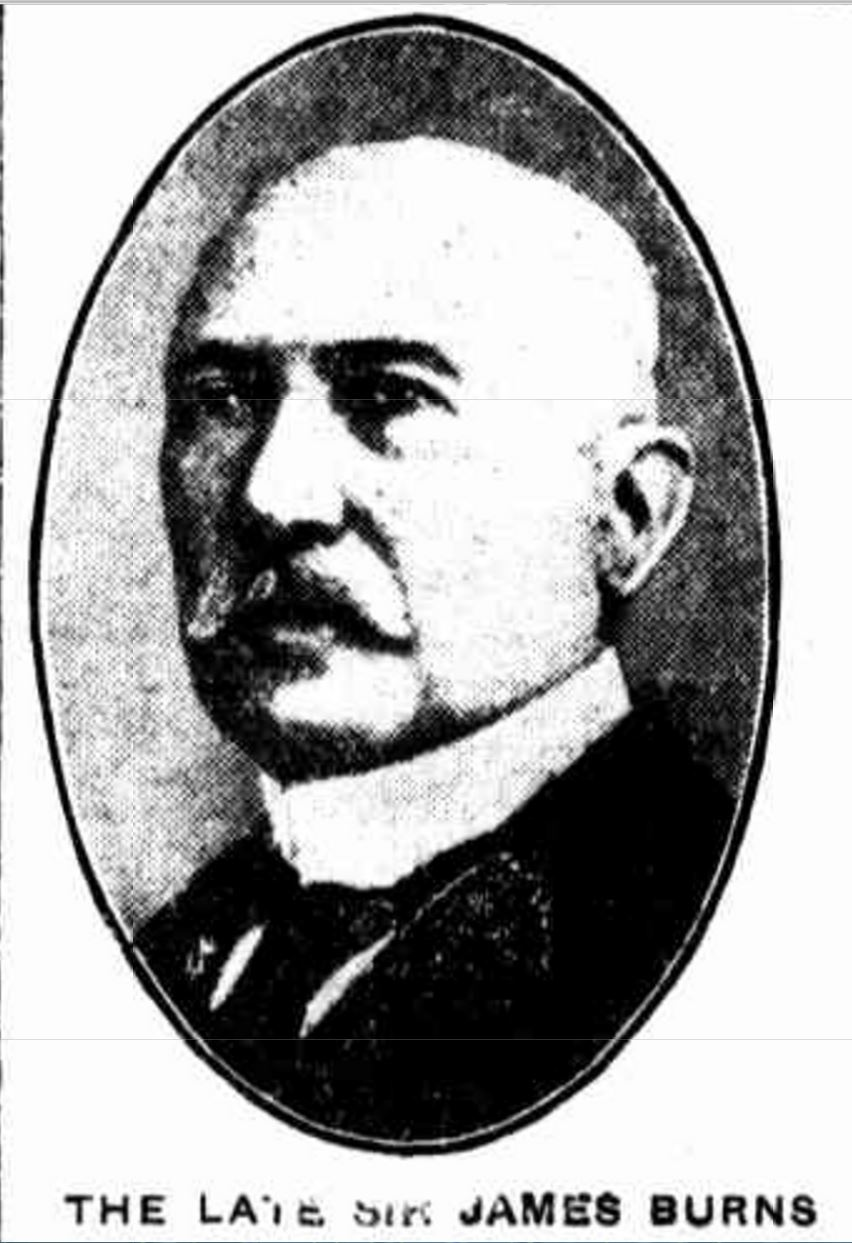
- Born: February 10, 1846; Polmont, Scotland
- Died: August 22, 1923 (aged 77)
- Occupations: Businessman, Shipowner, Philanthropist, Politician
- Known for: Co-founder of Burns Philp and Company
- Honours: KCMG

Sir James Burns KCMG (10 February 1846 – 22 August 1923) was a businessman, shipowner and philanthropist in Australia. In particular, he is known as the co-founder of Burns Philp and Company, a shipping and trading company, and for establishing the Burnside Presbyterian Homes for Children in North Parramatta (now known as UnitingCare Burnside), a children and family welfare organisation.

== Early life ==
Burns was born at Polmont, Scotland, the son of a merchant, David Burns, and educated at Newington Academy and the Royal High School in Edinburgh. He migrated to Queensland in 1862 and worked for three years in Western Queensland as a jackaroo. In 1865 he formed a Brisbane store, Burns & Scott, in partnership with his brother, and established the first stores in Gympie and nearby One Mile Creek and Kilkivan in 1867, when gold was found there. He then sold his interests and returned to Scotland in 1870 after the death of his father. He briefly visited France as an observer and assistant in relief efforts after the Paris Commune of 1871 before returning to Queensland.

== Business and other activities ==
In 1871, Burns returned to North Queensland to establish a new trading company in Townsville. He later loaned Robert Philp enough money to become a partner in the enterprise. The company thrived through ownership of sail and steam powered trading ships, initially leased to ensure a steady supply of goods between Queensland and Sydney. This formed the basis of the Queensland Steam Shipping Company Limited, later amalgamated into Burns Philp, which remains as a major trading company today. The shipping expanded into various ports in the East Indies and the Pacific Islands, and the company branched into various trading endeavours throughout the following decades.

In addition to establishing Burns Philp, his business interests include serving as chairman of the (North) Queensland Insurance Co. Ltd in 1886–1923, the New South Wales Mortgage, Land, and Agency Co. and the Solomon Islands Development Co. Ltd. He was also a director of the Australian Mutual Provident Society, the Sydney Exchange Co., the Bank of North Queensland, and various collieries, as well as owning extensive Queensland pastoral properties.

Burns served on a royal commission of inquiry into railway administration in 1906 and was appointed to the Legislative Council of New South Wales in 1908. He joined the Parramatta troop of the 1st Royal New South Wales Lancers as a trooper in June 1891 and was immediately promoted Captain, and became Major in January 1896. From September 1897 to June 1903 he commanded the regiment as its Lieutenant-Colonel. He was promoted to Colonel in July 1903 and commanded the 1st Australian Light Horse Brigade until January 1907, when he retired.

Burns was president of the Caledonian Society for twenty years. During World War I Burns helped establish a scheme for insuring enlisted men with dependants, personally contributing £2000 a year during the duration of the war.

== Later life ==
From the 1880s, Burns was based at a property known as Gowan Brae, north of Parramatta. He retired from government and business activities due to ill health in 1908, and lived at Gowan Brae from that time on. Shortly afterwards, he approached the Presbyterian Church of Australia, suggesting that they establish a Presbyterian home for children. In 1910 he endowed some of the Gowan Brae property, to establish the Presbyterian Homes for Children (later renamed Burnside and currently known as UnitingCare Burnside), and was chairman of its board for ten years. It became his passion in his "retired" years, as he made numerous contributions towards new homes and the children. His business and government connections ensured that donations from other sources were also forthcoming, with houses named after sponsors and officially opened by dignitaries.

Burns continued to live at Gowan Brae until his death and was buried there in a family cemetery, which now lies within The King's Schools grounds. He left the property to his son, James, but suggested that, should James not need the property, it should be given to the (then) Burnside Presbyterian Orphans Homes. James honoured this request, and the property was donated.

Much of the land has since been sold or leased to other organisations, or as residential developments. The property immediately around Gowan Brae is now owned by The King's School, while sections of the property are now owned by the Redeemer Baptist School and Tara Anglican School for Girls, with some still owned by the Synod of New South Wales and the ACT of the Uniting Church in Australia for Burnside's own operations and the synod's activities such as the archives, Camden Library and the Uniting Theological College.
