= James Murdoch (New South Wales politician) =

Australian politician (1867–1939)

Sir James Anderson Murdoch KBE CMG (10 March 1867 – 30 January 1939) was a Scottish-born Australian politician.

He was born in Edinburgh to cabinetmaker Thomas Murdoch and Margaret Anderson. He worked at a wool warehouse before migrating to Melbourne in 1884; after a period in Brisbane, he established a business in Sydney in 1893. In 1892, he married Isabella Binning, with whom he had three daughters. His business eventually became a large retail company. During World War I he served with the Australian Army Medical Corps, holding the rank of lieutenant-colonel; he was mentioned in despatches four times. In the 1918 New Year Honours, he was appointed a Companion of the Order of St Michael and St George for services rendered in connection with military operations in the field. Appointed to the New South Wales Legislative Council as a Nationalist in 1923, he was created a Knight Commander of the Order of the British Empire in the 1928 Birthday Honours for public and charitable service. He left the Legislative Council on its reconstitution in 1934, and died at Manly in 1939.

== Burnside Public School ==
In 1922, Burnside Public School (known as Murdoch School for many years) was built for 17,000 pounds by James Murdoch in order to overcome the "problems of transporting the Burnside Homes children to North Parramatta School".
