= Dean Mumm =

Australian rugby union player

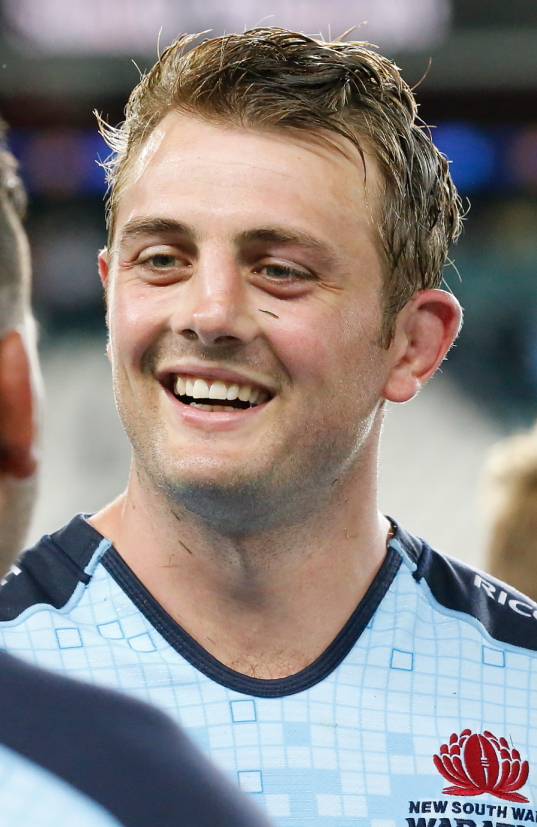
- Born: Dean Mumm; 5 March 1984 (age 42) Auckland, New Zealand
- Height: 1.96 m (6 ft 5 in)
- Weight: 109 kg (240 lb; 17 st 2 lb)
- School: The King's School, Parramatta
- Notable relative: Bill Mumm (grandfather)

Rugby union career
- Position: Lock / Flanker
Senior career
Years	Team	Apps	(Points)
2007	Sydney Fleet	7	(0)
2012–2015	Exeter Chiefs	70	(65)
Provincial / State sides
Years	Team	Apps	(Points)
2004	Waratahs	12	(5)
Super Rugby
Years	Team	Apps	(Points)
2007–2012, 2015–2017	Waratahs	101	(55)
- Correct as of 21 July 2016
International career
Years	Team	Apps	(Points)
2008–2017	Australia	56	(25)
–	Barbarians		
Medal record
Men's rugby union
Representing Australia
Rugby World Cup
Silver medal – second place	2015 England	Squad

Dean Mumm (born 5 March 1984) is an Australian former representative rugby union player. He made fifty-six appearances for the Wallabies.

== Background ==
Dean Mumm was born in Auckland, New Zealand.

== Career ==
=== Amateur career ===
Mumm attended The King's School, Sydney, along with fellow Waratahs Benn Robinson, Daniel Halangahu and Will Caldwell. He captained The King's School rugby XV team in 2001 and 2002, winning the GPS title in the latter year. Mumm made appearances for the U16 Australian rugby team and captained the Australian Schoolboys team in 2002. Mumm was selected for the Australian Universities and Australian Barbarians teams in 2004, and was a member of the Australian under 21 team which was runner up in the 2005 IRB Under 21 World Championship. Mumm graduated New South Wales Waratah Academy and went on to attend the University of Sydney where he played in SUFC sides which twice won the Tooheys New Cup.

=== Professional career ===
Although primarily a second-rower, Mumm has been utilised as flanker, making use of his athleticism whilst adding height to the line-out. He debuted for the NSW Waratahs against Salta on their 2004 Argentine rugby tour. Mumm made his Super Rugby debut against the Lions in Johannesburg, in 2007, and completed his Super Rugby debut season with a try against the Hurricanes in Wellington, New Zealand. Mumm went on to play 12 out of 13 games in the 2007 season for the Waratahs, missing one through injury. During his tenure with the Waratahs, Dean also played on multiple occasions for the Wallabies. It was announced on 23 April 2012 that Dean will be joining English Aviva Premiership team Exeter Chiefs. On 8 August 2013, he was named as Exeter Chiefs' team captain for the 2013–14 season.

=== International career ===
Mumm was selected for the first Australian team to be sent to the Pacific Nations Cup, the Australian A national rugby union team, in 2007. That side finished second to the Junior All Blacks who also won the cup in 2006. In May 2013 Mumm was selected in a Barbarians line-up which faced England at Twickenham and the British and Irish Lions in Hong Kong.

On 27 September 2015, he captained the Wallabies to a 65–3 win over Uruguay during the 2015 Rugby World Cup.

On 24 May 2017 Dean announced his retirement from all levels of Rugby Union at the completion of the 2017 season.

== Personal life ==
Mumm's brother, Greg, is a former director of rugby of the Sydney first grade team Sydney University and was former assistant coach of the Waratahs and also of the Fijian national rugby team that made it to the Rugby World Cup quarter finals in 2007. Greg is currently the managing director of The Final Whistle, a company that assists athletes with their life after sport career options. His grandfather, Bill Mumm, was an All Black. His cousin is Brumby, Julian Salvi. Dean is currently a member of The Wallabies, Australia's national team. He is also in the World Cup squad announced on 19 August 2015.

Mumm is an Australian ambassador for Borne, a medical research charity looking into the causes of premature birth. In April 2018, Mumm walked to the North Pole to raise awareness of premature birth and helped raise over £750,000 in support of Borne's research.

Preceded by Michael Hooper	Australian national rugby union captain 2015	Succeeded by Michael Hooper
