= Timothy Hawkes (headmaster) =

Timothy Hawkes OAM
- Education: University of Durham; Macquarie University
- Occupations: Educator; Author

Timothy Francis Hawkes is an Australian educator who is a former headmaster of The King's School, Parramatta, stepping down from the post in 2017 after serving in the role for almost 20 years.

== Early life and education ==
Born in Adelaide, in 1953, Hawkes' initial education was at Bordertown Primary and at the Woomera Area School. Because the family moved overseas, Hawkes completed his secondary education as a boarder at The King's School, Rochester in England where he became school captain. He undertook undergraduate studies at Durham University, England, graduating with a BEd (Hons) in 1975. He had a particular talent for sport, playing rugby for the university and participating in athletics at county level. While at university, Hawkes also participated in the 1973 British Undergraduates Expedition to the Jotenheim region of Norway and worked with opium and heroin drug addicts at the "Society of St. Stephen" in Hong Kong. After teaching at Loughborough Grammar School for five years, Hawkes returned to Australia in 1981 to teach at Knox Grammar School in Sydney, where he eventually became Senior Boarding Master. It was during this time that a sexual assault (by another person) on a child under his care was not reported to police. He undertook postgraduate studies at Macquarie University in Sydney where he obtained his PhD in May 1988. His thesis reflected his main teaching discipline which was Geography and was entitled 'A study of factors influencing children's ability to recognize features on black and white aerial photographs.' Hawkes also completed a Graduate Diploma in Education Administration at the University of New England

Hawkes met his wife, Jane, at Durham University in England and they have three adult children.

== Principal of St Leonard's College ==
In 1989, Hawkes accepted the position of Principal of St Leonard's College, Melbourne, a co-educational independent school. During his time at St Leonard's, Hawkes engaged in a vigorous building program and raised enrolments from 1200 to nearer 1500. He also became the founding Chairman of the Heads of Independent Co-educational Schools of Victoria and was instrumental in establishing the Association of Co-Educational Schools sporting competition. Following on from a re-vitalisation of the International Baccalaureate program at St Leonard's, Hawkes served as a heads of school representative on the governing board of the International Baccalaureate Organisation.

== Headmaster of the King's School ==
In 1998, Hawkes moved to Sydney to become headmaster of The King's School, an independent, Anglican, day and boarding school for boys and Australia's oldest independent school. Soon after joining King's, he featured in the ABC documentary about the school and its new headmaster entitled 'King's School.' While at King's, Hawkes has rebuilt much of the School and has been an active contributor at many educational conferences both in Australia and overseas, including being a keynote speaker at the Headmaster's Conference of Great Britain in 2003. His main focus is on the education of boys, and more recently the teaching of leadership skills to students. His works are largely confined to primary and secondary level education but he also comments on broader matters of social interest. His more recently published works include "Blizzard Lines", a novel that explores the relationship between a father and a son.

During the 1998, 2001 and 2004 Australian federal elections, Hawkes became an active participant in the national discussion on education with The King's School being frequently cited by the Australian Labor Party as an exemplar of a well-funded private school in receipt of significant government funding. Hawkes defended the right of independent schools, even well-resourced schools, to receive at least some government funding. This continued into the 2007 election.

== Contribution to public debate ==
As the founding chair of the Australian Boarding Schools' Association, he wrote "Duty of Care" the major training course for boarding staff used in Australia and has advanced the cause of boarding in the media. he has been an advisor to the federal government, serving as a member of the "Forum on the Education of Boys" in 2002. His book "Boy Oh Boy" has become a best seller and he continues to write and speak extensively on the issue of educating boys.

His four-book series "Learning Leadership" – a leadership training course for students- has become popular in many schools throughout the world. Several articles have been written by Hawkes advocating the teaching of leadership and values in schools.

He has been a strong defender of independent education. In 2005, then-Federal Education Minister Brendan Nelson raised the prospect of teaching intelligent design in science classes, but quickly retreated to declare that religion or philosophy classes would be the only appropriate venue. The Australian chapter of Campus Crusade for Christ distributed a DVD of the Discovery Institute's documentary Unlocking the Mystery of Life (2002) to Australian secondary schools. Prominent scientific and educational organisations including the Australian Academy of Science, the Federation of Australian Scientific and Technological Societies, and the Australian Science Teachers' Association published an open letter urging that "the teaching or promulgation of intelligent design as science" should be prohibited, and that allowing such materials into school classrooms "would make a mockery of Australian science teaching and throw open the door of science classes to similarly unscientific world views – be they astrology, spoon bending, flat Earth cosmology or alien abductions." Within a week of this open letter being published, Hawkes declared his support for using the DVD in the classroom at the discretion of teachers and principals, stating that "[t]here are undeniable weaknesses within Darwin's Theory of Evolution, and these must be acknowledged honestly"; he added that the DVD being "forever shackled" and restricted to only the context of religious education would be a shame as teachers should be able to use it in science classes and other areas where theories and their underlying scientific assumptions are explored. The debate on intelligent design resulted in Hawkes being nominated for the Bent Spoon Award of the Australian Skeptics organisation in 2006; Nelson had been nominated 17 times when the organisation decided not to accept any further nominations for him. Neither of them won the award.

In 2007, Hawkes was given a "quality teaching" federal government award for excellence as a school principal for "rejuvenating the educational philosophy and practice of The King's School by building on its strengths as a national leader in boys' education, residential education and leadership education. School results have significantly improved under his leadership".

Hawkes is patron of the "Foresight Foundation" an organisation that assists adults who are both deaf and blind. He served from 2000 to 2008 as the national chairman of Overseas Missionary Fellowship and is president of the "Under 16s", an organisation that supports those who volunteered while being under the age of 16 years for service in World War II.

== Appearance at the Royal Commission into Institutional Responses to Child Sexual Abuse ==
As of February 2015 the Royal Commission into Institutional Responses to Child Sexual Abuse is conducting public hearings (commenced on 23 February 2015) concerning the response of Knox Grammar, and the Uniting Church, to complaints and criminal proceedings involving teachers who sexually abused students. Hawkes appeared to give testimony on the "Balaclava Man" incident. Comments he made while leaving the commission were subject to media and public reaction.
