= Ben Batger =

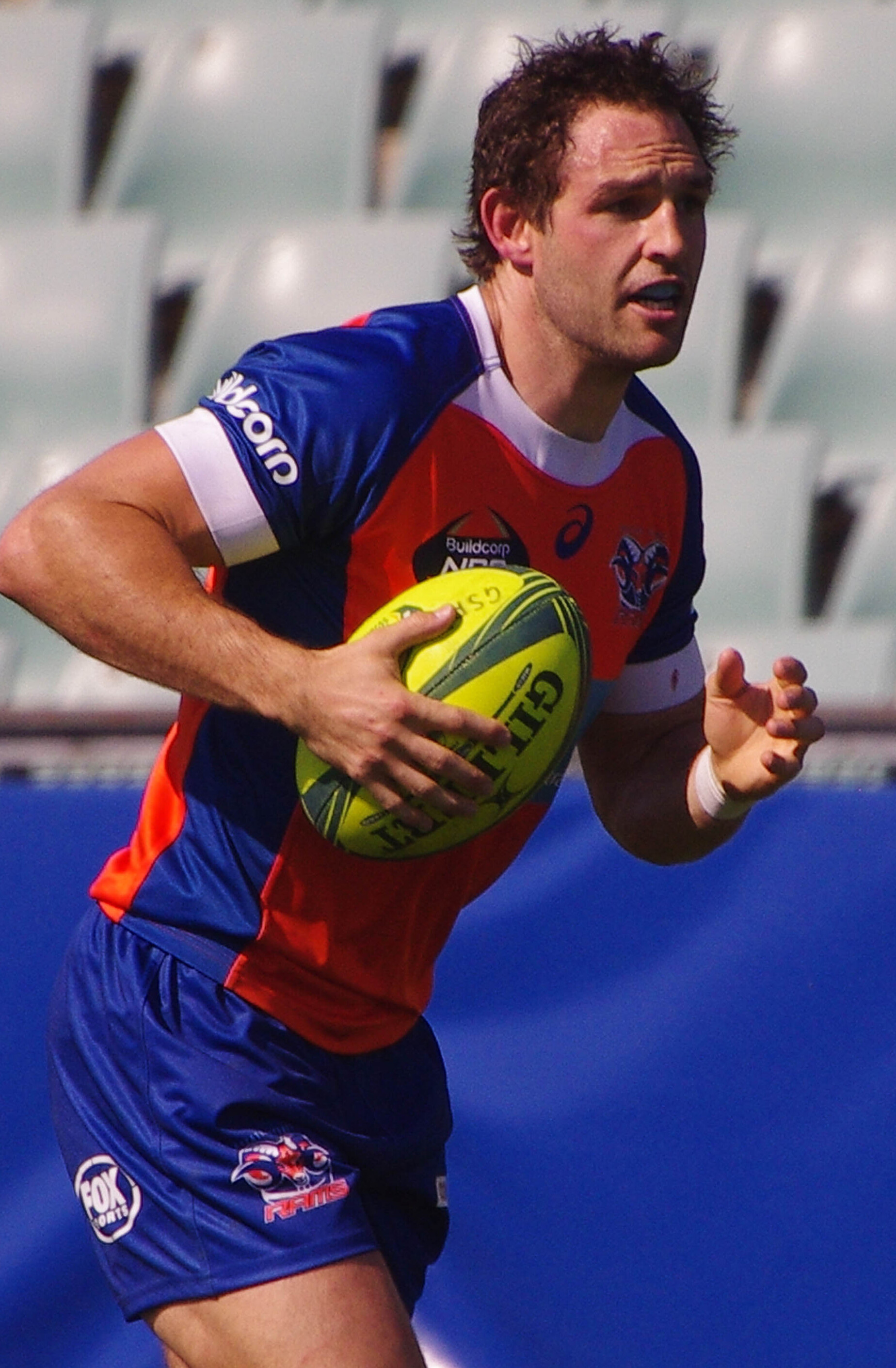
- Batger in 2014
- Born: Ben Batger; 20 March 1984 (age 42) Sydney, New South Wales, Australia
- Height: 1.83 m (6 ft 0 in)
- Weight: 90 kg (200 lb)
- University: University of Technology Sydney

Rugby union career
- Position(s): Fullback, Wing
- Current team: Eastern Suburbs (head coach)
Amateur team(s)
Years	Team	Apps	(Points)
2004-2015	Eastwood	191	(1850)
Senior career
Years	Team	Apps	(Points)
2009–2010	Pro Recco (it)		
2014	Greater Sydney Rams	3	(10)
Provincial / State sides
Years	Team	Apps	(Points)
2007	Hawke's Bay	11	(15)
Super Rugby
Years	Team	Apps	(Points)
2005–2006	Brumbies	9	(5)
2008–2011	Waratahs	2	(0)
Coaching career
- Years: Team
- 2013–2014: Barker College 1st XV (assistant)
- 2016–2017: OMBAC
- 2017–2018: Eastwood (assistant)
- 2019–2023: Eastwood
- 2024–: Eastern Suburbs

Ben Batger (born 20 March 1984) is an Australian rugby union coach and former player. He attended The King's School, Parramatta, playing in the 1st XV. His usual position was fullback or wing. He has played for the New South Wales Waratahs and Brumbies in the Super Rugby competition, and for Hawkes Bay in New Zealand's National Provincial Championship (NPC). In 2009, he played for Pro Recco in Italy. He also represented the Greater Sydney Rams in the Australian National Rugby Competition (NRC). He played his club football with Eastwood in Sydney's Shute Shield competition, where he won several premiership and holds several point scoring records.

== Career ==
Following the end of his playing career, he turned to coaching. He successfully led American rugby club, Old Mission Beach Athletic Club, to a California Cup title in 2016. He then returned home as an assistant coach at Eastwood and the Greater Sydney Rams in 2017/18. In 2019 he was named head coach of Eastwood. In 2024, Batger became the new head coach of Eastern Suburbs, nicknamed Easts. In his first season as head coach, he led the club to their first Shute Shield premiership in 55 years after defeating Northern Suburbs (Norths) 36–35 in the Grand Final. Liberal MP for Vaucluse, Kellie Sloane, congratulated Batger and the club on their achievement in the New South Wales Parliament.

In 2025 Batger took East back to the grand but suffered a heartbreaking loss to Warringah 27-24.

In 2026 Easts completed the remarkable achievement of three grand finals in row this time getting revenge on Warringah 31-15. For Batger it meant two grand final victories in three years with Easts.
