= James Hilgendorf =

- Born: 29 March 1982 (age 44) Sydney, Australia
- Height: 1.82 m (6 ft 0 in)
- Weight: 89 kg (196 lb)

Rugby union career
- Position(s): Fly half, Centre, Fullback
Senior career
Years	Team	Apps	(Points)
2002-2013	Eastwood	96	
2005–06	Viadana	16	
2007	Perth Spirit	4	
2008	Kintetsu Liners	8	
2009	Kobelco Steelers	8	
Provincial / State sides
Years	Team	Apps	(Points)
2004–05	Taranaki	14	(35)
Super Rugby
Years	Team	Apps	(Points)
2003	Waratahs	2	(0)
2006–08	Western Force	15	(10)
2011–13	Rebels	17	(10)
- Correct as of 7 June 2013
International career
Years	Team	Apps	(Points)
2000	Australia Schoolboys		

James Hilgendorf (born 29 March 1982 in Sydney, Australia) is a rugby union professional who plays for the Melbourne Rebels in the Super Rugby competition. His usual position is fly-half, but he can also play in the centres or at fullback.

== Early career ==
Hilgendorf is a product of the Eastwood club in Sydney. He was an Australian Schoolboy representative in 2000, along with fellow Rebel Mark Gerrard. He made his Waratahs' debut in 2003.

He transferred to Western Force for the 2006 to 2008 Super Rugby seasons, then moved to Japan to play for the Kintetsu Liners, and later the Kobelco Steelers. In May 2010 Hilgendorf signed to join the Melbourne Rebels for the 2011 Super Rugby season. After short stints with both the Waratahs and Rebels in 2013, Hilgendorf retired after the Shute Shield final loss to Sydney University with his long term school mate Tim Davidson.

He now is an accredited RUPA Rugby Union Player Agent who works for The Blaze Agency Pty Ltd and rugby coach at The King's School, Parramatta.
