= Ben Hand =

- Born: Ben Hand; 24 April 1982 (age 44) Sydney, Australia
- Height: 1.99 m (6 ft 6 1/2 in)
- Weight: 112 kg (17 st 9 lb)

Rugby union career
- Position: Lock
Senior career
Years	Team	Apps	(Points)
2007	Western Sydney Rams	8	(0)
2008	Calvisano	20	(5)
2012–2017	Grenoble	103	(0)
- Correct as of 11 February 2014
Super Rugby
Years	Team	Apps	(Points)
2007	Waratahs	10	(0)
2009–2012	Brumbies	43	(0)

Ben Hand (born 24 April 1982 in Sydney, Australia) is an Australian rugby union player who plays for the Brumbies in Super Rugby. His playing position is lock. He made his Super Rugby debut for the Waratahs during the 2007 Super 14 season against the Lions in Johannesburg.

Hand will join French PRO D2 team Grenoble at the conclusion of the 2012 Super Rugby season.
