= Redeemer Baptist School =

School in Sydney, Australia

Coordinates: 33.793937°S 151.017251°E

- North Parramatta, New South Wales; Australia

Information
- Type: Independent, Christian school
- Motto: To hear is to obey
- Denomination: Baptist
- Established: 1981
- Founders: Noel Cannon, Maxwell Shaw & the fellowship of Redeemer Baptist Church
- Principal: Jon Cannon
- Headmaster: Russell Bailey
- Grades: Preschool to Year 12
- Enrolment: 420
- Campus: 10 hectares
- Colours: Navy and white
- Affiliations: Redeemer Baptist Church, Association of Independent Schools NSW, Australian Association of Christian Schools
- Website: www.redeemer.nsw.edu.au

Redeemer Baptist School, commonly known as Redeemer, is a Baptist private school in North Parramatta, Sydney, Australia. It was founded in 1981 and now has over 400 students.

== History ==
The school was founded in 1981 in the context of the Christian Community Schools movement, which began in the mid-1970s. Various Christian schools were set up as people felt there was a need for an alternative to the state school system and established schools as a ministry of a local church congregation. Families in the Redeemer Baptist Church left their jobs in business and education to commence working for the School and Church. Redeemer Baptist Church was influenced by the Church of the Redeemer, an Episcopal church in Houston, United States, from which the church and school take their names.

=== Structural relationship between church and school ===
Redeemer Baptist School is operated as a not-for-profit company limited by guarantee, Redeemer Baptist School Ltd (ABN 62 002 650 704), whose directors are simultaneously directors of Redeemer Baptist Church Property Limited, Redeemer Baptist Services Limited, and Redeemer Community Aid Limited. This structural integration between the school's corporate governance and the church's related entities. The school's stated long-term objective, as recorded in successive Directors' Reports lodged with the Australian Charities and Not-for-profits Commission, is not primarily educational but religious: "to provide a stable corporate vehicle that enables Christian ministry through volunteer members of the Redeemer Baptist Church Ministry Order."

The organization has a membership of between five and seven people across the reporting period, each contributing a maximum guarantee of $20 in the event of winding up.

== Controversy ==
=== Staff exodus and allegations of control (2004–2005) ===
In late 2004, twenty-eight members of the Redeemer Baptist Church congregation including twelve members of the school's teaching staff left the organisation en masse, triggering a period of sustained public scrutiny that would last for years. Former members alleged that church leader Noel Cannon exercised authoritarian control over virtually every aspect of members' lives, including career choices, marriage arrangements, family relationships, and housing. Alan Nutt, one of the church's founding elders, publicly described the dynamic as "very deliberate brainwashing to change people's mindset about personal relationships, family relationships," and said that young members were systematically taught to distrust their own families in order to deepen their dependence on the church leadership. Former member Andrew Frost described his upbringing inside the community as "living hell," while another former member, Dean Gregory, characterised Redeemer as having "a great facade" that concealed pervasive control and "destroyed lives." The congregation strenuously denied allegations that it operated as a cult.

On 20 March 2005, the Channel Nine Sunday program broadcast an investigation into the church and school titled "Unholy Devotion," reported by Daniel Street. The broadcast brought the organisation to national attention and featured testimony from multiple former members describing emotional, psychological and spiritual abuse. Baptist Minister Reverend Tim Costello backed the former members' characterisation of the organisation, describing it in his view as "an authoritarian leader in what amounts to, in my view in its practice, a cult."

=== Wages underpayment ===
Among the most serious material allegations to emerge from the 2004 exodus were claims that the school had systematically underpaid its teaching staff. Former members and their supporters alleged that some teachers had been paid as little as $11,000 per year a fraction of the award wage and that fourteen teachers were collectively owed approximately $6 million in unpaid wages. Parramatta accountant Graeme Glossop, who assisted the former staff members in documenting their claims, alleged that the school's employment arrangements were structured to avoid fringe benefits tax obligations. The school denied having been involved in any impropriety and called the allegations unfounded.

The school's annual financial reports lodged with the Australian Charities and Not-for-profits Commission confirm that approximately 100 volunteers drawn from the Redeemer Baptist Church Ministry Order contributed to the school's operations in each year from 2015 to 2025. The 2015 Directors' Report states the school's long-term objective is "to provide a stable corporate vehicle that enables Christian ministry through volunteer members of the Redeemer Baptist Church Ministry Order."

=== Financial growth and government funding ===
Redeemer Baptist School Ltd has experienced substantial financial growth over the decade to 2025, as documented in its publicly lodged audited financial reports. Total revenue grew from $7.68 million in 2015 to $17.77 million in 2025. An increase of approximately 131% over ten years. Government grants have been a consistently dominant income stream throughout this period, growing from $3.60 million in 2015 to $8.64 million in 2025, and representing approximately 47–49% of total revenue across every year in the period. Tuition fees grew from $2.49 million in 2015 to $6.32 million in 2025.

The school has recorded a financial surplus in every year from 2015 to 2025, with surpluses ranging from $532,702 (2016) to $4.39 million (2023). Over the same period, the school's total equity (retained surplus) grew from $16.14 million at the end of 2015 to $41.35 million at the end of 2025. The school is registered as a not-for-profit entity and is exempt from income tax under Subdivision 50-B of the Income Tax Assessment Act 1997.

The financial reports from 2015 to 2025 consistently list the same five directors, all of whom are simultaneously directors of the related entities Redeemer Baptist Church Property Limited, Redeemer Baptist Services Limited, and Redeemer Community Aid Limited, illustrating the degree of structural integration between the church and the school's corporate governance.

2026 Media Attention and Parliamentary Inquiry

An investigation led by The Sydney Morning Herald and Channel 9 Australia detailed evidence given by former church and staff members of sexual, psychological and financial abuse, coercive control and possible tax evasion. The accusations led to a NSW upper house Parliamentary Inquiry led by Greens Party Member Abigail Boyd. The inquiry saw evidence given by former staff, education officials and the Anti-Slavery Commissioner detailing control tactics used by school board members which warrant further investigation. The committee will report by the end of 2026 with their findings.

== National Redress Scheme listing ==
Redeemer Baptist School is listed on the Australian National Redress Scheme's register of institutions. The National Redress Scheme was established by the Australian Government in response to the Royal Commission into Institutional Responses to Child Sexual Abuse and offers redress to survivors of institutional abuse. Inclusion on the register indicates the entity is recognised for redress purposes, but does not imply findings of liability.

== Campuses and facilities portfolio ==
The school's audited financial reports, lodged with the Australian Charities and Not-for-profits Commission, document a substantial property portfolio that grew from $36.26 million at historical cost in 2014 to $57.49 million in 2025, a rise of approximately 59 per cent over eleven years. At net book value, the land and buildings portfolio reached $43.24 million by the end of 2025, up from $27.69 million in 2014, with total property, plant and equipment at net book value reaching $44.49 million.

The portfolio includes the school's main campus on 10 hectares at 2–14 Masons Drive, North Parramatta; a vocational campus at Castle Hill House (circa 1844) at 215–219 Old Northern Road, Castle Hill; and a 10.41-hectare property at Long Beach, New South Wales, acquired in March 2018 for $2.9 million (plus GST) for use as a school camp. The restoration of Castle Hill House was carried out with volunteer labour from Redeemer Baptist Church congregation members, which the school states involved in excess of 120,000 volunteer hours.

The 2005 Channel Nine Sunday program reported that Redeemer Baptist Church members live communally in residential properties in the area, and that housing arrangements are directed by church leadership. All five directors of Redeemer Baptist School Ltd are simultaneously directors of the related entity Redeemer Baptist Church Property Limited.

== See also ==
- List of non-government schools in New South Wales
