= Church of the Redeemer (Houston, Texas) =

Coordinates: 29.7394°N 95.3342°W

Church of the Redeemer, Episcopal
- Church of the Redeemer, Episcopal
- Location: Houston, Texas
- Denomination: Episcopalian

History
- Founded: 1920

Administration
- Diocese: Episcopal Diocese of Texas

The Church of the Redeemer, Episcopal in Houston, Texas is an Episcopal inner city church. During the late 1960s, under Rector Graham Pulkingham and for several decades, it was a center for liturgically based worship and charismatic revival. Redeemer was the origin for the Community of Celebration in the UK and the US, and the traveling worship ministry The Fisherfolk. In March, 2011 the church began sharing the use of a nearby Lutheran church of the same name.

== History ==
The mainline Episcopal church was founded in 1920 in the East End of Houston. Church membership declined during the 1950s and early 1960s. It increased during the 1960s and 1970s but then experienced sustained decline into the 21st century. As the building fell into disrepair, the dwindling community was unable to afford to repair the building.

=== Architecture ===
The church was originally known as the Eastwood Church, named after the planned subdivision where it was built in 1919 on a triangle of land donated by the Episcopal Diocese of Texas at the intersection of Eastwood, Dallas and Telephone. An adjacent "Teleph Hall" and three-story Education Building were added in the 1930s next to the small church building. In the 1950s Tellepsen Construction replaced the church with a new Sanctuary of reinforced concrete. The interior is striking with its use of curved forms, and a massive mural "Christ of the Working Man" by John William Orth. Following concerns of the building's integrity in an inspection in February, 2011, the community moved their services to the Evangelical Lutheran Church of the Redeemer.

== Worship ==
=== Services ===
According to the church, the services "have a long history of emphasis on music in worship and the use of blended music, using both traditional hymns with more contemporary praise music. Our services use organ and piano as well as guitar—and occasionally bass guitar, electric guitar, accordion, trumpet, and drums." Highlighting the informal style of worship, whenever there is a 5th Sunday in a month, the congregation celebrates a service "in the round," in which the congregation gathers around the piano and the members choose worship songs during the service.

== Community ==
Rev. Pulkingham drew around him a group of lay elders, including Lawyer Jerry Barker, Doctor Robert Eckert, Houston Light & Power lineman John Grimmett, and men from a variety of business backgrounds: Ladd Fields, Andy Austin. During the 1970s, young adults drawn to the worship were invited to live in extended family households. Each household had a common purse, and all took part in the weekly food co-op distribution of fresh vegetables, fruit and milk. The community was also sent young men registered as Conscientious Objectors to work in their Medical clinics. The church had a noticeable effect on the surrounding neighborhood, as residents improved their care of houses and yards. Many families were separated children from their parents under commands from Church Elders in many cases sexual child abuse was the result. Children were often not told when or if they were to return to their parents.

== Outreach Ministries ==
Medical clinics were set up in the Fourth Ward of Houston and in Eastwood - this later became a City of Houston clinic. Dr. Eckert and his helpers also set up annual trips to Mexico offering medical clinic service. "LaRoca" minister after-school and evenings to the neighborhood Hispanic children and their parents. The church has a volunteer relationship with Lantrip Elementary School next door.
