= Will Caldwell =

Australian rugby union footballer

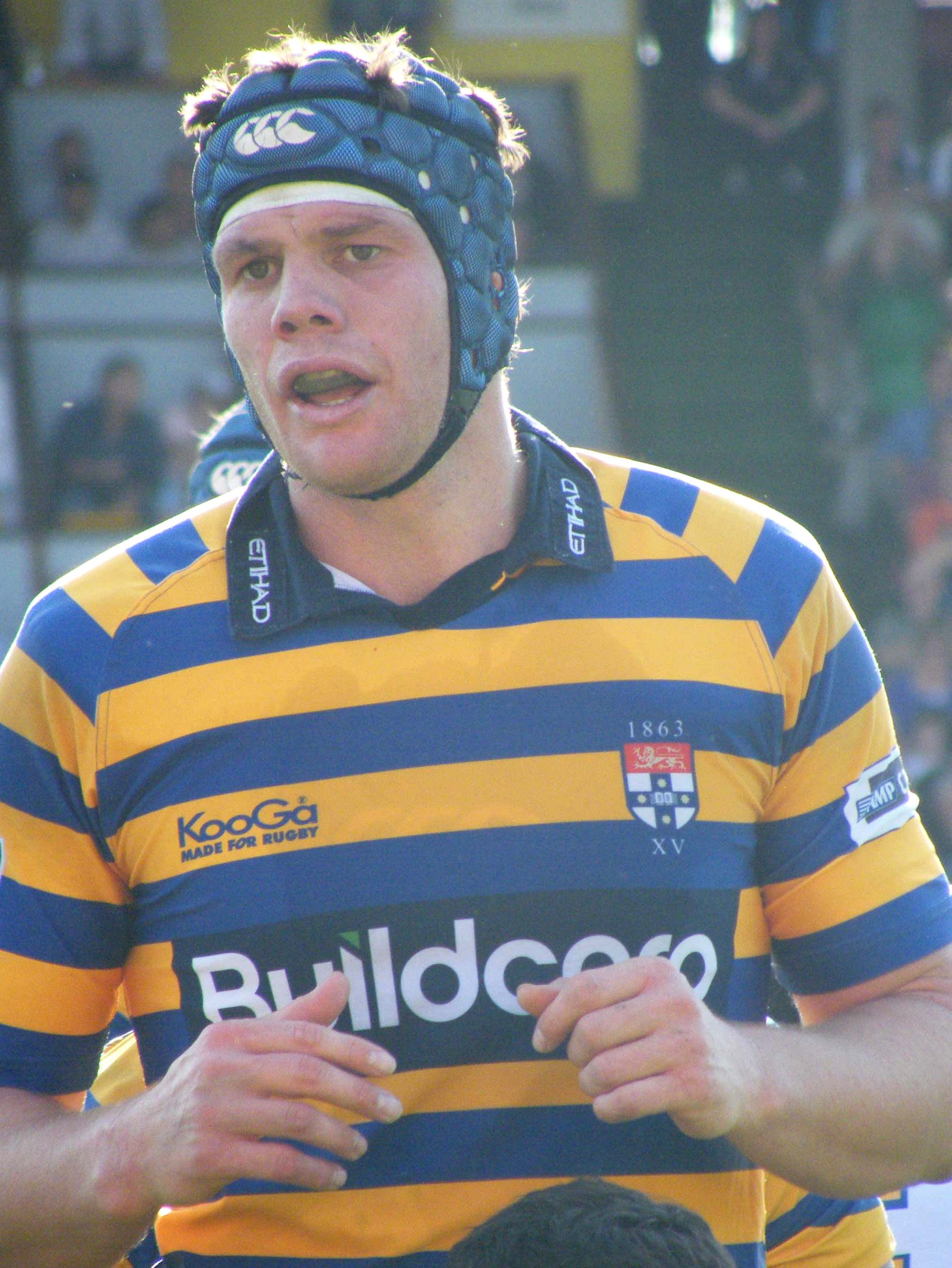
- Will Caldwell playing for Sydney University
- Born: Will Caldwell; 17 August 1982 (age 44) Young, New South Wales, Australia
- Height: 198 cm (6 ft 6 in)
- Weight: 112 kg (17 st 9 lb)

Rugby union career
- Position: Lock
- Current team: Sydney University
Super Rugby
Years	Team	Apps	(Points)
	NSW Waratahs	48	(5)

Will Caldwell is an Australian rugby union footballer who currently plays for the New South Wales Waratahs in the international Super Rugby competition as a lock.

== Career ==
Will Caldwell was named vice-captain for the Waratahs clashes with the Czech Republic and Romania on a tour of Eastern Europe. In 2005, he was named on the bench against the Blues.

A member of the Sydney University tight-five, he joined the Waratahs.

In 2005 he made his Super Rugby debut against Queensland. By the end of the 2006 season, Caldwell had accumulated a total of 11 caps for the Waratahs, and had scored one try. On 10 July 2006 he was called up to play for Australia A.
