= List of Queensland Reds players =

This is a list of rugby union footballers who have been capped for the Queensland Reds as recognised by Queensland Rugby Union (QRU). The QRU capping criteria recognises appearances against opposition "of a sufficient quality to warrant the awarding of a Queensland Cap". Players are sorted by debut date and then alphabetically for the run-on XV, with those coming on off the bench capped in order of appearance.

== Player list ==
=== Super Rugby era ===
| No. | Name | Caps (SR) | Tries (SR) | C (SR) | P (SR) | DG (SR) | Points (SR) | Debut | Last |
|---|---|---|---|---|---|---|---|---|---|
| 1064 | Tony Daly | 10 | 1 | | | | 5 | 03/03/1996 | 18/05/1996 |
| 1065 | Elton Flatley | 88 | 11 | 92 | 130 | | 629 | 03/03/1996 | 11/03/2006 |
| 1066 | Jacob Rauluni | 47 | 4 | | | | 20 | 03/03/1996 | 11/05/2002 |
| 1067 | Michael Flanagan | 2 | 1 | | | | 5 | 17/03/1996 | 22/03/1997 |
| 1068 | Manasa Bari | 0 | | | | | | 06/01/1996 | |
| 1069 | Peter Clohessy | 5 | | | | | | 01/03/1997 | 31/03/1997 |
| 1070 | Shane Drahm | 28 | 6 | 14 | 30 | 1 | 151 | 01/03/1997 | 19/05/2001 |
| 1071 | Elton Moncrieff | 4 | | | | | | 01/03/1997 | 22/03/1997 |
| 1072 | Rob Johnstone | 0 | | | | | | 01/03/1997 | |
| 1073 | Willie Carne | 8 | 1 | | | | 5 | 08/03/1997 | 17/05/1997 |
| 1074 | Brent Cockbain | 2 | | | | | | 17/05/1997 | 14/05/1999 |
| 1075 | Damian McInally | 2 | | | | | | 31/03/1997 | 07/03/1998 |
| 1076 | Scott Webster | 6 | 1 | | | | 5 | 05/04/1997 | 22/03/1998 |
| 1077 | John Watkins | 4 | | | | | | 12/04/1997 | 04/04/1998 |
| 1078 | Andrew Coombe | 0 | | | | | | 14/06/1997 | |
| 1079 | Nathan Grey | 0 | | | | | | 14/06/1997 | |
| 1080 | Adam Harley | 0 | | | | | | 14/06/1997 | |
| 1081 | Lachlan Grant | 0 | | | | | | 16/06/1997 | |
| 1082 | Nathan Williams | 36 | 6 | 1 | | | 32 | 16/06/1997 | 08/05/2004 |
| 1083 | Andrew Heath | 17 | | | | | | 27/02/1998 | 14/05/1999 |
| 1084 | Chris Latham | 99 | 41 | | 1 | 1 | 211 | 27/02/1998 | 10/05/2008 |
| 1085 | André Vos | 11 | | | | | | 27/02/1998 | 16/05/1998 |
| 1086 | Matt Edwards | 0 | | | | | | 13/06/1998 | |
| 1087 | Richard Graham | 2 | | | | | | 13/06/1998 | 20/04/2002 |
| 1088 | Veniasi Maitaitini | 0 | | | | | | 13/06/1998 | |
| 1089 | Mike Mitchell | 5 | | | | | | 13/06/1998 | 27/04/2002 |
| 1090 | Ricky Nalatu | 10 | | | | | | 13/06/1998 | 19/05/2001 |
| 1091 | John Stafford | 2 | | | | | | 13/06/1998 | 08/05/1999 |
| 1092 | Bruce Starr | 0 | | | | | | 13/06/1998 | |
| 1093 | Nick Stiles | 68 | 5 | | | | 25 | 13/06/1998 | 14/05/2005 |
| 1094 | Luke Hammond | 0 | | | | | | 13/06/1998 | |
| 1095 | Tim Lough | 0 | | | | | | 16/06/1998 | |
| 1096 | Nathan Sharpe | 70 | 5 | | | | 25 | 16/06/1998 | 14/05/2005 |
| 1097 | Brendan Underwood | 0 | | | | | | 20/06/1998 | |
| 1098 | Cullum Hughes | 0 | | | | | | 20/06/1998 | |
| 1099 | Nathan Spooner | 18 | 2 | 20 | 51 | | 203 | 17/10/1998 | 22/04/2001 |
| 1100 | Sam Cordingley | 43 | 3 | | | | 15 | 13/02/1999 | 17/05/2008 |
| 1101 | Kelly Gordon | 0 | | | | | | 13/02/1999 | |
| 1102 | Sean Hardman | 122 | 5 | | | | 25 | 13/02/1999 | 15/05/2010 |
| 1103 | Warwick Waugh | 12 | 1 | | | | 5 | 27/02/1999 | 22/05/1999 |
| 1104 | Ross West | 0 | | | | | | 19/06/1999 | |
| 1105 | Tim Sampson | 0 | | | | | | 19/06/1999 | |
| 1106 | Scott Barton | 0 | | | | | | 22/06/1999 | |
| 1107 | Brad Condon | 0 | | | | | | 22/06/1999 | |
| 1108 | Dave Duley | 0 | | | | | | 22/06/1999 | |
| 1109 | John Roe | 82 | 17 | | | | 85 | 22/06/1999 | 26/04/2008 |
| 1110 | Damien Flynn | 0 | | | | | | 22/06/1999 | |
| 1111 | Daniel Godbold | 0 | | | | | | 22/06/1999 | |
| 1112 | Shane Tiatia | 0 | | | | | | 22/06/1999 | |
| 1113 | Scott Fava | 6 | | | | | | 04/09/1999 | 14/04/2001 |
| 1114 | Rod Seib | 0 | | | | | | 04/09/1999 | |
| 1115 | Tim Walsh | 6 | | 2 | 2 | | 10 | 04/09/1999 | 27/02/2010 |
| 1116 | Steve Kefu | 54 | 9 | 1 | | | 47 | 30/09/1999 | 05/05/2006 |
| 1117 | Tu Tamarua | 0 | | | | | | 30/09/1999 | |
| 1118 | Fletcher Dyson | 39 | 1 | | | | 5 | 03/02/2000 | 12/04/2003 |
| 1119 | Daniel Heenan | 23 | 2 | | | | 10 | 19/02/2000 | 29/04/2005 |
| 1120 | Graeme Thompson | 0 | | | | | | 19/02/2000 | |
| 1121 | Timote Tavalea | 2 | | | | | | 26/02/2000 | 04/03/2000 |
| 1122 | Simon Kerr | 3 | | | | | | 08/04/2000 | 09/03/2002 |
| 1123 | David Croft | 94 | 8 | | | | 40 | 13/06/2000 | 17/05/2008 |
| 1124 | Van Humphries | 54 | 4 | | | | 20 | 13/06/2000 | 20/04/2012 |
| 1125 | John Slater | 0 | | | | | | 13/06/2000 | |
| 1126 | Shaun Barry | 0 | | | | | | 13/06/2000 | |
| 1127 | Chris Garrard | 0 | | | | | | 13/06/2000 | |
| 1128 | Tom McVerry | 44 | | | | | | 13/06/2000 | 05/05/2007 |
| 1129 | Jason Ramsamy | 1 | | | | | | 08/02/2001 | 22/04/2001 |
| 1130 | Rick Tyrrell | 0 | | | | | | 08/02/2001 | |
| 1131 | Junior Pelesasa | 34 | 9 | | | | 45 | 14/04/2001 | 06/05/2005 |
| 1132 | David McCallum | 0 | | | | | | 16/06/2001 | |
| 1133 | Michael Tabrett | 6 | | | | | | 16/06/2001 | 10/05/2003 |
| 1134 | Andrew Scotney | 6 | | 2 | 3 | | 13 | 16/06/2001 | 11/05/2002 |
| 1136 | Paul Warwick | 0 | | | | | | 06/10/2001 | |
| 1135 | Wendell Sailor | 43 | 12 | | | | 60 | 06/10/2001 | 14/05/2005 |
| 1137 | Ben Wakely | 6 | 1 | | | | 5 | 23/03/2001 | 26/04/2003 |
| 1138 | Tom Murphy | 11 | | | | | | 08/02/2002 | 11/05/2002 |
| 1139 | Anthony Mathison | 24 | | | | | | 08/02/2002 | 12/05/2006 |
| 1140 | Rob McDonald | 0 | | | | | | 08/02/2002 | |
| 1141 | Reece Goode | 0 | | | | | | 04/06/2002 | |
| 1142 | Rudi Vedelago | 21 | 1 | | | | 5 | 04/06/2002 | 14/05/2005 |
| 1143 | Jeremy Austin | 0 | | | | | | 04/06/2002 | |
| 1144 | Andrew Farley | 0 | | | | | | 04/06/2002 | |
| 1145 | Sam Batty | 0 | | | | | | 08/06/2002 | |
| 1146 | Tim Atkinson | 20 | 1 | | | | 5 | 08/02/2003 | 12/05/2006 |
| 1147 | Luke Doherty | 20 | | | | | | 28/02/2003 | 14/05/2005 |
| 1148 | Gene Fairbanks | 1 | | | | | | 08/02/2003 | 08/03/2003 |
| 1149 | Julian Huxley | 32 | 5 | 23 | 22 | | 137 | 08/02/2003 | 12/05/2006 |
| 1150 | Peter Hynes | 77 | 19 | | | | 95 | 08/02/2003 | 26/02/2011 |
| 1151 | Tai McIsaac | 15 | | | | | | 08/02/2003 | 08/05/2004 |
| 1152 | Adam Wallace-Harrison | 30 | 2 | | | | 10 | 08/02/2003 | 10/05/2013 |
| 1153 | Josh Graham | 0 | | | | | | 08/02/2003 | |
| 1154 | Josh Valentine | 38 | 4 | | | | 20 | 08/02/2003 | 12/05/2006 |
| 1155 | Luke Caughley | 0 | | | | | | 11/02/2003 | |
| 1156 | Brad Tronc | 0 | | | | | | 11/02/2003 | |
| 1157 | Stephen Moore | 60 | 7 | | | | 35 | 19/04/2003 | 14/07/2017 |
| 1158 | Peter Niumata | 5 | | | | | | 19/04/2003 | 24/03/2006 |
| 1159 | Cameron Northcott | 0 | | | | | | 15/06/2003 | |
| 1160 | Damian Hoo | 0 | | | | | | 15/06/2003 | |
| 1161 | Matt Stafford | 0 | | | | | | 15/06/2003 | |
| 1162 | Kuresa Lee | 0 | | | | | | 29/06/2003 | |
| 1163 | Daniel Leo | 0 | | | | | | 29/06/2003 | |
| 1164 | Christopher Lyons | 0 | | | | | | 29/06/2003 | |
| 1165 | Angus Scott | 9 | | | | | | 20/02/2004 | 08/05/2004 |
| 1166 | Drew Mitchell | 35 | 9 | | | | 45 | 20/02/2004 | 12/05/2006 |
| 1167 | Todd Feather | 3 | 1 | 1 | 1 | | 10 | 28/02/2004 | 13/03/2004 |
| 1168 | Nic Berry | 28 | | | | | | 29/05/2004 | 05/05/2007 |
| 1169 | Lloyd Johansson | 20 | 1 | | | | 5 | 29/05/2004 | 14/04/2007 |
| 1170 | Hugh McMeniman | 28 | 1 | | | | 5 | 26/02/2005 | 25/04/2009 |
| 1171 | Greg Holmes | 144 | 7 | | | | 35 | 04/03/2005 | 15/07/2016 |
| 1172 | Mitchell Chapman | 28 | 2 | | | | 10 | 12/03/2005 | 05/05/2007 |
| 1173 | Rodney Blake | 36 | 2 | | | | 10 | 01/04/2005 | 17/05/2008 |
| 1174 | Scott Daruda | 1 | | | | | | 01/04/2005 | 01/04/2005 |
| 1175 | Brock James | 3 | | | | | | 09/04/2005 | 14/05/2005 |
| 1176 | Brett Sheehan | 4 | | | | | | 15/04/2005 | 14/05/2005 |
| 1177 | Andrew Brown | 8 | | | | | | 22/06/2005 | 05/05/2007 |
| 1178 | Ole Avei | 3 | | | | | | 22/06/2005 | 09/03/2007 |
| 1179 | David Collis | 0 | | | | | | 22/06/2005 | |
| 1180 | Ant Sauer | 2 | | | | | | 22/06/2005 | 16/05/2009 |
| 1181 | Matt Windle | 0 | | | | | | 22/06/2005 | |
| 1182 | Berrick Barnes | 45 | 7 | 18 | 7 | 6 | 110 | 11/02/2006 | 16/05/2009 |
| 1183 | Tom Court | 3 | | | | | | 11/02/2006 | 25/02/2006 |
| 1184 | James Horwill | 116 | 8 | | | | 40 | 11/02/2006 | 13/06/2015 |
| 1185 | Henari Veratau | 13 | | | | | | 11/02/2006 | 28/04/2007 |
| 1186 | Caleb Brown | 10 | 1 | | | | 5 | 18/02/2006 | 17/05/2008 |
| 1187 | Cameron Treloar | 13 | | | | | | 18/02/2006 | 05/05/2007 |
| 1188 | Ben Mowen | 1 | | | | | | 01/04/2006 | 01/04/2006 |
| 1189 | David Amosa | 0 | | | | | | 01/09/2006 | |
| 1190 | Dominic Fuller | 0 | | | | | | 01/09/2006 | |
| 1191 | Herman Hunt | 10 | | | | | | 01/09/2006 | 05/05/2007 |
| 1192 | Ed O'Donoghue | 55 | | | | | | 01/09/2006 | 13/06/2015 |
| 1193 | Sitani Satui | 0 | | | | | | 01/09/2006 | |
| 1194 | Dave Campbell | 0 | | | | | | 01/09/2006 | |
| 1195 | Peter Loane | 0 | | | | | | 01/09/2006 | |
| 1196 | Will Munsie | 0 | | | | | | 01/09/2006 | |
| 1197 | Ernest Skelton | 3 | | | | | | 01/09/2006 | 24/03/2007 |
| 1198 | Brett Gillespie | 0 | | | | | | 01/09/2006 | |
| 1199 | Ben Coutts | 10 | | | | | | 17/09/2006 | 17/05/2008 |
| 1200 | John Dart | 0 | | | | | | 17/09/2006 | |
| 1201 | Clinton Schifcofske | 23 | 3 | 28 | 42 | | 197 | 10/11/2006 | 17/05/2008 |
| 1202 | Quade Cooper | 117 | 23 | 138 | 140 | 7 | 843 | 10/11/2006 | 14/07/2017 |
| 1203 | Ben Daley | 80 | 2 | | | | 10 | 10/11/2006 | 15/07/2016 |
| 1204 | Will Genia | 115 | 18 | 1 | 1 | | 95 | 10/11/2006 | 13/06/2015 |
| 1205 | Charlie Fetoai | 23 | 2 | | | | 10 | 03/02/2007 | 16/05/2009 |
| 1206 | Brando Va'aulu | 35 | 3 | | | | 15 | 03/02/2007 | 15/05/2010 |
| 1207 | Andrew Walker | 11 | 1 | 1 | 5 | | 22 | 03/03/2007 | 18/04/2008 |
| 1208 | Gavin Warren | 1 | | | | | | 03/03/2007 | 03/03/2007 |
| 1209 | Tama Tuirirangi | 7 | | | | | | 16/03/2007 | 05/05/2007 |
| 1210 | David Te Moana | 5 | | | | | | 07/04/2007 | 05/05/2007 |
| 1211 | Geoff Abram | 2 | | | | | | 28/04/2007 | 05/05/2007 |
| 1212 | AJ Gilbert | 2 | | | | | | 05/05/2007 | 08/03/2008 |
| 1213 | Digby Ioane | 66 | 18 | | | | 90 | 15/02/2008 | 18/05/2013 |
| 1214 | Chris Siale | 3 | | | | | | 15/02/2008 | 01/03/2008 |
| 1215 | Morgan Turinui | 18 | 4 | | | | 20 | 15/02/2008 | 14/03/2010 |
| 1216 | Leroy Houston | 50 | 2 | | | | 10 | 15/02/2008 | 06/05/2017 |
| 1217 | Dayna Edwards | 15 | | | | | | 22/02/2008 | 06/03/2009 |
| 1218 | Ben Lucas | 82 | 9 | 6 | 7 | | 78 | 01/03/2008 | 02/06/2018 |
| 1219 | Poutasi Luafutu | 16 | 2 | | | | 10 | 15/03/2008 | 15/05/2010 |
| 1220 | Scott Higginbotham | 102 | 26 | | | | 130 | 15/03/2008 | 15/06/2019 |
| 1221 | Daniel Braid | 19 | 2 | | | | 10 | 14/02/2009 | 01/05/2010 |
| 1222 | Adam Byrnes | 19 | | | | | | 14/02/2009 | 01/05/2010 |
| 1223 | Anthony Fainga'a | 89 | 5 | | | | 25 | 14/02/2009 | 21/05/2016 |
| 1224 | Saia Fainga'a | 100 | 7 | | | | 35 | 14/02/2009 | 15/07/2016 |
| 1225 | Mark McLinden | 12 | 3 | | | | 15 | 14/02/2009 | 16/05/2009 |
| 1226 | Rob Simmons | 114 | 4 | | | | 20 | 14/02/2009 | 14/07/2017 |
| 1227 | Laurie Weeks | 23 | 1 | | | | 5 | 14/02/2009 | 23/04/2010 |
| 1228 | Blair Connor | 7 | 1 | | | | 5 | 20/02/2009 | 05/03/2010 |
| 1229 | Jack Kennedy | 8 | | | | | | 14/03/2009 | 01/05/2010 |
| 1230 | Ezra Taylor | 15 | 1 | | | | 5 | 14/03/2009 | 15/05/2010 |
| 1231 | Rodney Davies | 58 | 19 | | | | 95 | 28/03/2009 | 12/07/2014 |
| 1232 | Brendan McKibbin | 4 | | 5 | | | 10 | 28/03/2009 | 08/05/2009 |
| 1233 | Luke Morahan | 45 | 11 | | | | 55 | 18/04/2009 | 20/07/2013 |
| 1234 | Andrew Shaw | 4 | | | | | | 08/05/2009 | 07/05/2010 |
| 1235 | Richard Kingi | 5 | | | | | | 08/05/2009 | 15/05/2010 |
| 1236 | Ben Tapuai | 66 | 8 | | | | 40 | 08/05/2009 | 13/06/2015 |
| 1237 | Will Chambers | 26 | 5 | | | | 25 | 13/02/2010 | 02/07/2011 |
| 1238 | James Slipper | 104 | 5 | | | | 25 | 13/02/2010 | 12/05/2018 |
| 1239 | Jake Schatz | 86 | 8 | | | | 40 | 19/02/2010 | 16/04/2016 |
| 1240 | James Hanson | 82 | 7 | | | | 35 | 19/02/2010 | 13/06/2015 |
| 1241 | Radike Samo | 34 | 5 | | | | 25 | 07/05/2010 | 20/07/2013 |
| 1242 | Lei Tomiki | 1 | | | | | | 07/05/2010 | 07/05/2010 |
| 1243 | Ed Quirk | 39 | 1 | | | | 5 | 15/05/2010 | 02/05/2014 |
| 1244 | Beau Robinson | 56 | 1 | | | | 5 | 20/02/2011 | 13/06/2015 |
| 1245 | Aidan Toua | 24 | 2 | | | | 10 | 20/02/2011 | 13/04/2019 |
| 1246 | Mike Harris | 45 | 6 | 42 | 51 | 1 | 270 | 26/02/2011 | 12/07/2014 |
| 1247 | Liam Gill | 76 | 11 | | | 1 | 58 | 05/03/2011 | 15/07/2016 |
| 1248 | Ian Prior | 5 | | | | | | 02/04/2011 | 02/07/2011 |
| 1249 | Guy Shepherdson | 5 | | | | | | 09/04/2011 | 02/07/2011 |
| 1250 | Dom Shipperley | 44 | 13 | | | | 65 | 30/04/2011 | 27/06/2014 |
| 1251 | Albert Anae | 29 | 1 | | | | 5 | 30/04/2011 | 14/05/2022 |
| 1252 | Ben Coridas | 2 | | | | | | 04/06/2011 | 11/06/2011 |
| 1253 | Jono Lance | 34 | 3 | 22 | 16 | | 107 | 11/06/2011 | 13/07/2018 |
| 1254 | Dallan Murphy | 3 | | 2 | | | 4 | 18/06/2011 | 31/03/2012 |
| 1255 | Caleb Ralph | 1 | | | | | | 18/06/2011 | 18/06/2011 |
| 1256 | Nick Frisby | 65 | 11 | 3 | | 1 | 64 | 17/03/2012 | 26/05/2017 |
| 1257 | Joel Rapana | 1 | | | | | | 31/03/2012 | 31/03/2012 |
| 1258 | Nathan Eyres-Brown | 1 | | | | | | 31/03/2012 | 31/03/2012 |
| 1259 | Sam Lane | 2 | | 2 | 2 | | 10 | 06/04/2012 | 20/04/2012 |
| 1260 | Chris Feauai-Sautia | 81 | 21 | | | | 105 | 19/05/2012 | 12/09/2020 |
| 1261 | Blake Enever | 1 | | | | | | 29/06/2012 | 29/06/2012 |
| 1262 | Jarrad Butler | 12 | | | | | | 06/07/2012 | 18/05/2013 |
| 1263 | Curtis Browning | 35 | 4 | | | | 20 | 23/03/2013 | 15/07/2016 |
| 1264 | Sam Denny | 0 | | | | | | 08/06/2013 | |
| 1265 | Jono Owen | 12 | | | | | | 20/07/2013 | 17/05/2014 |
| 1266 | Lachie Turner | 22 | 10 | 2 | 2 | | 60 | 22/02/2014 | 13/06/2015 |
| 1267 | Jonah Placid | 1 | | | | | | 05/04/2014 | 05/04/2014 |
| 1268 | Jamie-Jerry Taulagi | 10 | 1 | | | | 5 | 05/04/2014 | 08/05/2015 |
| 1269 | David McDuling | 12 | | | | | | 11/05/2014 | 11/04/2015 |
| 1270 | Samu Kerevi | 73 | 26 | | | | 130 | 30/05/2014 | 15/06/2019 |
| 1271 | Tim Buchanan | 1 | | | | | | 05/07/2014 | 05/07/2014 |
| 1272 | Scott Gale | 5 | | | | | | 05/07/2014 | 05/03/2016 |
| 1273 | Sam Johnson | 2 | | | | | | 05/07/2014 | 12/07/2014 |
| 1274 | Kirisi Kuridrani | 25 | 4 | | | | 20 | 12/07/2014 | 02/06/2017 |
| 1275 | Karmichael Hunt | 32 | 4 | | 1 | | 23 | 13/02/2015 | 14/07/2017 |
| 1276 | Marco Kotze | 11 | 2 | | | | 10 | 13/02/2015 | 08/05/2015 |
| 1277 | Sam Talakai | 41 | | | | | | 13/02/2015 | 07/07/2017 |
| 1278 | Sef Fa'agase | 83 | 2 | | | | 10 | 13/02/2015 | 06/06/2025 |
| 1279 | Campbell Magnay | 17 | 2 | | | | 10 | 13/02/2015 | 14/07/2017 |
| 1280 | Duncan Paia'aua | 48 | 7 | | | | 35 | 13/02/2015 | 15/06/2019 |
| 1281 | Adam Thomson | 15 | | | | | | 21/02/2015 | 13/06/2015 |
| 1282 | Tom Murday | 4 | | | | | | 21/02/2015 | 11/04/2015 |
| 1283 | James O'Connor | 66 | 5 | 103 | 59 | 1 | 411 | 27/02/2015 | 25/05/2024 |
| 1284 | Tom Banks | 2 | | | | | | 14/03/2015 | 15/07/2016 |
| 1285 | Pettowa Paraka | 7 | | | | | | 14/03/2015 | 19/03/2016 |
| 1286 | Michael Gunn | 8 | | | | | | 27/03/2015 | 15/07/2016 |
| 1287 | Adam Korczyk | 28 | 2 | | | | 10 | 11/04/2015 | 07/06/2019 |
| 1288 | Lolo Fakaosilea | 4 | | | | | | 26/04/2015 | 22/05/2015 |
| 1289 | Andrew Ready | 30 | 3 | | | | 15 | 26/04/2015 | 26/05/2018 |
| 1290 | Jake McIntyre | 23 | 3 | 18 | 16 | 1 | 102 | 15/05/2015 | 02/06/2017 |
| 1291 | Sam Greene | 6 | | | | | | 15/05/2015 | 06/05/2016 |
| 1292 | Hendrik Tui | 30 | | | | | | 06/06/2015 | 02/06/2017 |
| 1293 | Eto Nabuli | 38 | 11 | | | | 55 | 27/02/2016 | 13/07/2018 |
| 1294 | Cadeyrn Neville | 16 | 1 | | | | 5 | 27/02/2016 | 07/07/2017 |
| 1295 | Henry Taefu | 4 | | 4 | 1 | | 11 | 27/02/2016 | 15/07/2016 |
| 1296 | Ayumu Goromaru | 8 | | 3 | 8 | | 30 | 27/02/2016 | 21/05/2016 |
| 1297 | Ben Matwijow | 11 | | | | | | 27/02/2016 | 21/05/2016 |
| 1298 | Junior Laloifi | 6 | | | | | | 05/03/2016 | 14/05/2016 |
| 1299 | Waita Setu | 3 | | | | | | 05/03/2016 | 19/03/2016 |
| 1300 | Matt Mafi | 4 | | | | | | 12/03/2016 | 08/07/2016 |
| 1301 | Lukhan Salakaia-Loto | 89 | 9 | | | | 45 | 16/04/2016 | 06/06/2026 |
| 1302 | James Tuttle | 24 | 1 | 6 | 11 | | 50 | 16/04/2016 | 14/04/2018 |
| 1303 | Jack Tuttle | 2 | | | | | | 01/07/2016 | 08/07/2016 |
| 1304 | Kane Douglas | 29 | | | | | | 01/07/2016 | 06/07/2018 |
| 1305 | Taniela Tupou | 87 | 24 | | | | 120 | 01/07/2016 | 29/04/2022 |
| 1306 | Alex Gibbon | 2 | | | | | | 08/07/2016 | 15/07/2016 |
| 1307 | George Smith | 22 | 2 | | | | 10 | 24/02/2017 | 29/06/2018 |
| 1308 | Izack Rodda | 46 | 3 | | | | 15 | 24/02/2017 | 29/02/2020 |
| 1309 | Izaia Perese | 17 | 4 | | | | 20 | 02/03/2017 | 02/06/2018 |
| 1310 | Markus Vanzati | 5 | | | | | | 11/03/2017 | 14/07/2017 |
| 1311 | Kirwan Sanday | 9 | | | | | | 25/03/2017 | 02/06/2017 |
| 1312 | Lachlan Maranta | 2 | | | | | | 25/03/2017 | 08/04/2017 |
| 1313 | Phil Kite | 1 | | | | | | 01/04/2017 | 01/04/2017 |
| 1314 | Hamish Stewart | 72 | 6 | 7 | 1 | | 47 | 08/04/2017 | 03/06/2022 |
| 1315 | Alex Mafi | 61 | 13 | | | | 65 | 08/04/2017 | 25/02/2022 |
| 1316 | Moses Sorovi | 37 | 2 | | | | 10 | 08/04/2017 | 11/06/2021 |
| 1317 | Caleb Timu | 21 | 5 | | | | 25 | 07/07/2017 | 15/06/2019 |
| 1318 | Reece Hewat | 1 | | | | | | 14/07/2017 | 14/07/2017 |
| 1319 | Jayden Ngamanu | 3 | | | | | | 14/07/2017 | 02/06/2018 |
| 1320 | | | | | | | | | |
| 1321 | Brandon Paenga-Amosa | 55 | 14 | | | | 70 | 23/02/2018 | 11/06/2021 |
| 1322 | JP Smith | 39 | 1 | | | | 5 | 23/02/2018 | 19/09/2020 |
| 1323 | Liam Wright | 86 | 12 | | | | 60 | 23/02/2018 | 09/03/2025 |
| 1324 | Filipo Daugunu | 94 | 33 | 3 | 2 | | 177 | 23/02/2018 | 06/06/2026 |
| 1325 | Tate McDermott | 108 | 34 | | | | 170 | 23/02/2018 | 06/06/2026 |
| 1326 | Harry Hockings | 28 | | | | | | 02/03/2018 | 14/03/2020 |
| 1327 | Angus Scott-Young | 69 | 2 | | | | 10 | 02/03/2018 | 03/06/2022 |
| 1328 | Ruan Smith | 28 | | | | | | 17/03/2018 | 05/09/2020 |
| 1329 | Jordan Petaia | 58 | 16 | | | | 80 | 07/04/2018 | 19/04/2024 |
| 1330 | Harry Hoopert | 48 | 4 | | | | 20 | 28/04/2018 | 03/06/2022 |
| 1331 | Angus Blyth | 73 | 4 | | | | 20 | 13/07/2018 | 06/06/2025 |
| 1332 | Teti Tela | 1 | | | | | | 13/07/2018 | 13/07/2018 |
| 1333 | Feao Fotuaika | 31 | 2 | | | | 10 | 22/02/2019 | 03/06/2022 |
| 1334 | Bryce Hegarty | 44 | 9 | 49 | 22 | | 209 | 22/02/2019 | 11/06/2021 |
| 1335 | Isaac Lucas | 15 | 3 | | | | 15 | 22/02/2019 | 14/03/2020 |
| 1336 | Sefa Naivalu | 13 | 3 | | | | 15 | 22/02/2019 | 15/06/2019 |
| 1337 | Jack Hardy | 7 | 1 | | | | 5 | 09/03/2019 | 21/08/2020 |
| 1338 | Fraser McReight | 98 | 25 | | | | 125 | 24/03/2019 | 06/06/2026 |
| 1339 | Jock Campbell | 102 | 24 | 15 | 3 | | 159 | 13/04/2019 | 06/06/2026 |
| 1340 | Matt McGahan | 5 | | | | 1 | 3 | 18/05/2019 | 15/06/2019 |
| 1341 | Seb Wileman | 1 | | | | | | 24/05/2019 | 24/05/2019 |
| 1342 | Gavin Luka | 2 | | | | | | 01/06/2019 | 07/06/2019 |
| 1343 | Scott Malolua | 13 | | | | | | 01/06/2019 | 15/08/2020 |
| 1344 | Hunter Paisami | 77 | 10 | | | | 50 | 31/01/2020 | 29/05/2026 |
| 1345 | Henry Speight | 7 | 3 | | | | 15 | 31/01/2020 | 14/03/2020 |
| 1346 | Seru Uru | 71 | 9 | | | | 45 | 31/01/2020 | 29/05/2026 |
| 1347 | Harry Wilson | 93 | 25 | | | | 125 | 31/01/2020 | 06/06/2026 |
| 1348 | Dane Zander | 41 | | | | | | 31/01/2020 | 10/06/2023 |
| 1349 | Josh Nasser | 51 | 10 | | | | 50 | 08/02/2020 | 06/06/2026 |
| 1350 | Ed Craig | 2 | 1 | | | | 5 | 22/02/2020 | 29/02/2020 |
| 1351 | Tuaina Taii Tualima | 12 | 1 | | | | 5 | 03/07/2020 | 14/05/2022 |
| 1352 | Josh Flook | 66 | 25 | | | | 125 | 10/07/2020 | 06/06/2026 |
| 1353 | Jack Straker | 4 | | | | | | 17/07/2020 | 21/08/2020 |
| 1354 | Zane Nonggorr | 67 | 2 | | | | 10 | 08/08/2020 | 06/06/2026 |
| 1355 | Jethro Felemi | 1 | | | | | | 15/08/2020 | 15/08/2020 |
| 1356 | Sean Farrell | 1 | | | | | | 15/08/2020 | 15/08/2020 |
| 1357 | Ryan Smith | 70 | 8 | 1 | | | 42 | 19/02/2021 | 06/06/2025 |
| 1358 | Richie Asiata | 49 | 10 | | | | 50 | 19/02/2021 | 29/05/2026 |
| 1359 | Ilaisa Droasese | 5 | 1 | | | | 5 | 19/02/2021 | 04/06/2021 |
| 1360 | Suliasi Vunivalu | 39 | 16 | | | | 80 | 26/02/2021 | 18/05/2024 |
| 1361 | Kalani Thomas | 74 | 3 | 1 | | | 17 | 27/03/2021 | 06/06/2026 |
| 1362 | Sam Wallis | 2 | | | | | | 27/03/2021 | 04/06/2021 |
| 1363 | Isaac Henry | 20 | 4 | 7 | 1 | | 37 | 14/05/2021 | 16/05/2026 |
| 1364 | Mac Grealy | 26 | | | | | | 04/06/2021 | 07/06/2024 |
| 1365 | Hudson Creighton | 1 | | | | | | 11/06/2021 | 11/06/2021 |
| 1366 | Lawson Creighton | 32 | 5 | 41 | 7 | | 128 | 19/02/2022 | 07/06/2024 |
| 1367 | Spencer Jeans | 5 | | | | | | 25/02/2022 | 06/05/2022 |
| 1368 | Matt Faessler | 58 | 20 | | | | 100 | 04/03/2022 | 06/06/2026 |
| 1369 | Connor Vest | 25 | 1 | | | | 5 | 12/03/2022 | 17/05/2025 |
| 1370 | Lopeti Faifua | 5 | | | | | | 15/04/2022 | 03/06/2023 |
| 1371 | Connor Anderson | 3 | | | | | | 04/11/2022 | 14/04/2023 |
| 1372 | Ben Navosailagi | 0 | | | | | | 04/11/2022 | |
| 1373 | Wilson Blyth | 0 | | | | | | 04/11/2022 | |
| 1374 | Phransis Sula-Siaosi | 4 | | | | | | 04/11/2022 | 14/04/2023 |
| 1375 | Louis Werchon | 18 | 2 | 11 | 2 | | 38 | 04/11/2022 | 29/05/2026 |
| 1376 | Floyd Aubrey | 2 | 1 | | | | 5 | 04/11/2022 | 18/05/2024 |
| 1377 | Taine Roiri | 0 | | | | | | 04/11/2022 | |
| 1378 | Joey Fittock | 0 | | | | | | 04/11/2022 | |
| 1379 | Tom Lynagh | 37 | 4 | 69 | 18 | | 212 | 25/02/2023 | 28/03/2026 |
| 1380 | Peni Ravai | 27 | 3 | | | | 15 | 25/02/2023 | 31/05/2024 |
| 1381 | Jake Upfield | 10 | 1 | | | | 5 | 25/02/2023 | 10/06/2023 |
| 1382 | Taj Annan | 12 | | | | | | 25/02/2023 | 07/06/2024 |
| 1383 | George Blake | 25 | 3 | | | | 15 | 29/04/2023 | 06/06/2026 |
| 1384 | Paddy James | 1 | | | | | | 12/05/2023 | 12/05/2023 |
| 1385 | Max Craig | 1 | 1 | | | | 5 | 04/11/2023 | 03/05/2025 |
| 1386 | Moli Sooaemalagi | 0 | | | | | | 04/11/2023 | |
| 1387 | Massimo de Lutiis | 13 | | | | | | 04/11/2023 | 06/06/2026 |
| 1388 | Chris Minimbi | 0 | | | | | | 04/11/2023 | |
| 1389 | Lachlan Connors | 0 | | | | | | 04/11/2023 | |
| 1390 | Shaun Anderson | 0 | | | | | | 04/11/2023 | |
| 1391 | Cormac Daly | 8 | | | | | | 04/11/2023 | 18/05/2024 |
| 1392 | Harry McLaughlin-Phillips | 28 | 2 | 34 | 3 | | 87 | 04/11/2023 | 08/05/2026 |
| 1393 | John Bryant | 26 | | | | | | 04/11/2023 | 16/05/2026 |
| 1394 | Tim Ryan | 36 | 19 | | | | 95 | 04/11/2023 | 06/06/2026 |
| 1395 | Jeffery Toomaga-Allen | 37 | 3 | | | | 15 | 04/11/2023 | 23/05/2026 |
| 1396 | Alex Hodgman | 15 | | | | | | 24/02/2024 | 25/04/2025 |
| 1397 | Joe Brial | 35 | 7 | | | | 35 | 19/04/2024 | 06/06/2026 |
| 1398 | Dre Pakeho | 11 | 2 | | | | 10 | 19/07/2024 | 06/06/2025 |
| 1399 | Lachie Anderson | 23 | 10 | | | | 50 | 19/07/2024 | 06/06/2026 |
| 1400 | Josh Canham | 20 | 2 | | | | 10 | 19/07/2024 | 06/06/2026 |
| 1401 | Matt Gibbon | 0 | | | | | | 19/07/2024 | |
| 1402 | Will Cartwright | 0 | | | | | | 19/07/2024 | |
| 1403 | Mason Gordon | 0 | | | | | | 19/07/2024 | |
| 1404 | Feleti Kaitu'u | 0 | | | | | | 26/07/2024 | |
| 1405 | Frankie Goldsbrough | 1 | | | | | | 04/11/2024 | 09/03/2025 |
| 1406 | Kohan Herbert | 0 | | | | | | 04/11/2024 | |
| 1407 | Heremaia Murray | 9 | 2 | | | | 10 | 04/11/2024 | 03/05/2025 |
| 1408 | Hamish Muller | 12 | | | | | | 04/11/2024 | 06/06/2026 |
| 1409 | Jude Gibbs | 1 | | 1 | | | 2 | 12/04/2025 | 12/04/2025 |
| 1410 | Nick Bloomfield | 10 | | | | | | 23/05/2025 | 08/05/2026 |
| 1411 | Tom Robinson | 0 | | | | | | 15/08/2025 | |
| 1412 | Trevor King | 0 | | | | | | 15/08/2025 | |
| 1413 | Theo Fourie | 0 | | | | | | 15/08/2025 | |
| 1414 | James Martens | 1 | | | | | | 15/08/2025 | 13/02/2026 |
| 1415 | Xavier Rubens | 1 | | | | | | 15/08/2025 | 13/02/2026 |
| 1416 | Ollie Harris | 0 | | | | | | 15/08/2025 | |
| 1417 | Charlie Brosnan | 1 | | | | | | 15/08/2025 | 16/05/2026 |
| 1418 | Will McCulloch | 0 | | | | | | 15/08/2025 | |
| 1419 | Vaiuta Latu | 14 | 1 | | | | 5 | 25/10/2025 | 06/06/2026 |
| 1420 | Treyvon Pritchard | 12 | 2 | | | | 10 | 25/10/2025 | 06/06/2026 |
| 1421 | Jack Brady | 0 | | | | | | 25/10/2025 | |
| 1422 | Zac Hough | 0 | | | | | | 25/10/2025 | |
| 1423 | Graham Urquhart | 0 | | | | | | 25/10/2025 | |
| 1424 | Harrison Usher | 0 | | | | | | 25/10/2025 | |
| 1425 | Finn Mackay | 1 | | | | | | 25/10/2025 | 13/02/2026 |
| 1426 | Aidan Ross | 12 | 1 | | | | 5 | 13/02/2026 | 06/06/2026 |
| 1427 | Carter Gordon | 10 | 4 | 11 | 1 | | 45 | 27/02/2026 | 06/06/2026 |
| 1428 | Ben Volavola | 7 | | 2 | 1 | | 7 | 21/03/2026 | 06/06/2026 |
| 1429 | Cooper Stewart | 0 | | | | | | 14/11/2026 | |
| 1430 | Taione Taka | 0 | | | | | | 14/11/2026 | |
| 1431 | Lachlan Hooper | 0 | | | | | | 14/11/2026 | |
| 1432 | Kingsley Uys | 0 | | | | | | 14/11/2026 | |
| 1433 | Will Ross | 0 | | | | | | 14/11/2026 | |
| 1434 | Nicholas Conway | 0 | | | | | | 14/11/2026 | |
| 1435 | Mosiah Christian | 0 | | | | | | 14/11/2026 | |
| 1436 | Coby Miln | 0 | | | | | | 14/11/2026 | |

=== Capped players (1882–1995) ===
| Cap. | Name | Debut date | Debut opponent |
|---|---|---|---|
| 1 | Arthur Hickson | 12/08/1882 | New South Wales |
| 2 | Frank Baynes | 12/08/1882 | New South Wales |
| 3 | Jack Blake | 12/08/1882 | New South Wales |
| 4 | Tom Bond | 12/08/1882 | New South Wales |
| 5 | Jack Burrell | 12/08/1882 | New South Wales |
| 6 | Arthur Cutfield | 12/08/1882 | New South Wales |
| 7 | Arthur Feez | 12/08/1882 | New South Wales |
| 8 | Fred Hardgrave | 12/08/1882 | New South Wales |
| 9 | Hugh MacIntosh | 12/08/1882 | New South Wales |
| 10 | Ted Markwell | 12/08/1882 | New South Wales |
| 11 | George Pritchard | 12/08/1882 | New South Wales |
| 12 | Pring Roberts | 12/08/1882 | New South Wales |
| 13 | H. Stokes | 12/08/1882 | New South Wales |
| 14 | J. Townson | 12/08/1882 | New South Wales |
| 15 | Thomas Welsby | 12/08/1882 | New South Wales |
| 16 | James S. Anderson | 15/08/1883 | New South Wales |
| 17 | Frank Belbridge | 15/08/1883 | New South Wales |
| 18 | Reg Ellis | 15/08/1883 | New South Wales |
| 19 | G. Gordon | 15/08/1883 | New South Wales |
| 20 | H. R. Jewett | 15/08/1883 | New South Wales |
| 21 | Tom Pratten | 15/08/1883 | New South Wales |
| 22 | Frank Ransome | 15/08/1883 | New South Wales |
| 23 | Bill Shields | 15/08/1883 | New South Wales |
| 24 | Monty Smith | 15/08/1883 | New South Wales |
| 25 | W. Irving | 23/08/1883 | New South Wales |
| 26 | Sid Jones | 23/08/1883 | New South Wales |
| 27 | Thomas Armstrong | 12/07/1884 | New South Wales |
| 28 | Reg Eddison | 12/07/1884 | New South Wales |
| 29 | George Pratten | 12/07/1884 | New South Wales |
| 30 | E. Robinson | 12/07/1884 | New South Wales |
| 31 | J. Snell | 12/07/1884 | New South Wales |
| 32 | Fred Wood | 12/07/1884 | New South Wales |
| 33 | Syd Pritchard | 19/07/1884 | New South Wales |
| 34 | R. Bell | 19/08/1885 | New South Wales |
| 35 | John Byron | 19/08/1885 | New South Wales |
| 36 | Bert Durham | 19/08/1885 | New South Wales |
| 37 | Adolph Feeze | 19/08/1885 | New South Wales |
| 38 | Tom Manson | 19/08/1885 | New South Wales |
| 39 | A. W. Michael | 19/08/1885 | New South Wales |
| 40 | George Taylor | 19/08/1885 | New South Wales |
| 41 | J. Blanchard | 24/07/1886 | New South Wales |
| 42 | D. D. Hossack | 24/07/1886 | New South Wales |
| 43 | Fred O'Rourke | 24/07/1886 | New South Wales |
| 44 | Jim Orr | 24/07/1886 | New South Wales |
| 45 | Arthur Stacey | 24/07/1886 | New South Wales |
| 46 | J. Atkinson | 19/08/1887 | New South Wales |
| 47 | Jim Exton | 19/08/1887 | New South Wales |
| 48 | Tom Hughes | 19/08/1887 | New South Wales |
| 49 | George Manson | 19/08/1887 | New South Wales |
| 50 | A. Mutch | 19/08/1887 | New South Wales |
| 51 | Mickey O'Sullivan | 19/08/1887 | New South Wales |
| 52 | M. Rodger | 19/08/1887 | New South Wales |
| 53 | J. C. Sherrington | 19/08/1887 | New South Wales |
| 54 | Percy Small | 19/08/1887 | New South Wales |
| 55 | Bob Wilson | 19/08/1887 | New South Wales |
| 56 | Harry Pratten | 27/08/1887 | New South Wales |
| 57 | Barney Carr | 14/07/1888 | New South Wales |
| 58 | Charles Graham | 14/07/1888 | New South Wales |
| 59 | Ernie Hutton | 14/07/1888 | New South Wales |
| 60 | A. R. Pierson | 14/07/1888 | New South Wales |
| 61 | Deacon Wadsworth | 14/07/1888 | New South Wales |
| 62 | Ormsby Wilkins | 14/07/1888 | New South Wales |
| 63 | Fred Hillyar | 21/07/1888 | New South Wales |
| 64 | John Campbell | 18/08/1888 | Great Britain |
| 65 | Bill Eason | 18/08/1888 | Great Britain |
| 66 | Patrick Real | 18/08/1888 | Great Britain |
| 67 | Jack Scott | 18/08/1888 | Great Britain |
| 68 | R. Stronge | 18/08/1888 | Great Britain |
| 69 | Jack Johnston | 25/08/1888 | Great Britain |
| 70 | Harry Abbott | 13/07/1889 | New Zealand Natives |
| 71 | Orme Darvall | 13/07/1889 | New Zealand Natives |
| 72 | M. Hyland | 13/07/1889 | New Zealand Natives |
| 73 | W. Norton | 13/07/1889 | New Zealand Natives |
| 74 | Harry Speakman | 13/07/1889 | New Zealand Natives |
| 75 | E. Wickham | 13/07/1889 | New Zealand Natives |
| 76 | Archie Douglas | 20/07/1889 | New Zealand Natives |
| 77 | John Hadwen | 21/08/1889 | New South Wales |
| 78 | George Hensler | 21/08/1889 | New South Wales |
| 79 | C. Rennie | 21/08/1889 | New South Wales |
| 80 | Thomas Bell | 31/08/1889 | New South Wales |
| 81 | C. Cole | 31/08/1889 | New South Wales |
| 82 | H. A. Pennington | 31/08/1889 | New South Wales |
| 83 | F. A. Alexander | 19/07/1890 | New South Wales |
| 84 | George Beal | 19/07/1890 | New South Wales |
| 85 | Angus Graham | 19/07/1890 | New South Wales |
| 86 | John Griffin | 19/07/1890 | New South Wales |
| 87 | John Isles | 19/07/1890 | New South Wales |
| 88 | Charles McCowan | 19/07/1890 | New South Wales |
| 89 | Arthur Scott | 19/07/1890 | New South Wales |
| 90 | George Brereton | 26/07/1890 | New South Wales |
| 91 | Willie McCallum | 26/07/1890 | New South Wales |
| 92 | Duncan Pierson | 26/07/1890 | New South Wales |
| 93 | Glen Beal | 15/08/1891 | New South Wales |
| 94 | William Beattie | 15/08/1891 | New South Wales |
| 95 | George Counsell | 15/08/1891 | New South Wales |
| 96 | Doug Graham | 15/08/1891 | New South Wales |
| 97 | Jack O'Shea | 15/08/1891 | New South Wales |
| 98 | Harry Scarr | 15/08/1891 | New South Wales |
| 99 | Sid Stevens | 15/08/1891 | New South Wales |
| 100 | Billy Warbrick | 15/08/1891 | New South Wales |
| 101 | Dan Allman | 23/07/1892 | New South Wales |
| 102 | Harry Luya | 23/07/1892 | New South Wales |
| 103 | Frank Lyons | 23/07/1892 | New South Wales |
| 104 | J. Mathieson | 23/07/1892 | New South Wales |
| 105 | Charlie O'Rourke | 23/07/1892 | New South Wales |
| 106 | J. Patterson | 23/07/1892 | New South Wales |
| 107 | Harry Paul | 23/07/1892 | New South Wales |
| 108 | Jim Stevens | 23/07/1892 | New South Wales |
| 109 | Fred Warbrick | 23/07/1892 | New South Wales |
| 110 | J. Todd | 30/07/1892 | New South Wales |
| 111 | Arthur Austin | 15/07/1893 | New Zealand |
| 112 | Bob McCowan | 22/06/1893 | New South Wales |
| 113 | Bob Munro | 15/07/1893 | New Zealand |
| 114 | Butcher Yaldwyn | 15/07/1893 | New Zealand |
| 115 | Jack Holmes | 22/06/1893 | New South Wales |
| 116 | Coffey Jones | 22/06/1893 | New South Wales |
| 117 | Don Meade | 22/06/1893 | New South Wales |
| 118 | Sid Robertson | 22/06/1893 | New South Wales |
| 119 | Frank Ivory | 2/09/1893 | New South Wales |
| 120 | Tom Skinner | 2/09/1893 | New South Wales |
| 121 | Moff Austin | 21/07/1894 | New South Wales |
| 122 | Herbert Bullmore | 21/07/1894 | New South Wales |
| 123 | William Woods | 21/07/1894 | New South Wales |
| 124 | Will Hawkins | 28/07/1894 | New South Wales |
| 125 | Don Milne | 28/07/1894 | New South Wales |
| 126 | Steve Welch | 28/07/1894 | New South Wales |
| 127 | Bill Austin | 10/08/1895 | New South Wales |
| 128 | Sam Cockroft | 10/08/1895 | New South Wales |
| 129 | Jack Coghlan | 10/08/1895 | New South Wales |
| 130 | Pat Fewings | 10/08/1895 | New South Wales |
| 131 | Austin Gralton | 10/08/1895 | New South Wales |
| 132 | Duncan Nelson | 10/08/1895 | New South Wales |
| 133 | Toby Doyle | 25/07/1896 | New South Wales |
| 134 | Poley Evans | 25/07/1896 | New South Wales |
| 135 | Jim Higginson | 25/07/1896 | New South Wales |
| 136 | Frank Pollard | 25/07/1896 | New South Wales |
| 137 | Ernest Currie | 25/07/1896 | New South Wales |
| 138 | Jack Rundle | 25/07/1896 | New South Wales |
| 139 | Dooee Tanner | 25/07/1896 | New South Wales |
| 140 | Rush Nelson | 8/08/1896 | Auckland |
| 141 | S. Daddow | 12/08/1896 | Wellington |
| 142 | W. Tregear | 12/08/1896 | Wellington |
| 143 | Joseph Bradshaw | 17/07/1897 | New Zealand |
| 144 | Fred Brandon | 17/07/1897 | New Zealand |
| 145 | Lew Dixon | 17/07/1897 | New Zealand |
| 146 | A. H. Morrisby | 17/07/1897 | New Zealand |
| 147 | T. Martin | 24/07/1897 | New Zealand |
| 148 | Charles McDermott | 14/08/1897 | New South Wales |
| 149 | Mick Murphy | 14/08/1897 | New South Wales |
| 150 | Bob Broadfoot | 21/08/1897 | New South Wales |
| 151 | Ginger Colton | 21/08/1897 | New South Wales |
| 152 | Nicholas Colton | 21/08/1897 | New South Wales |
| 153 | Ben Samuels | 21/08/1897 | New South Wales |
| 154 | Sine Boland | 11/09/1897 | New South Wales |
| 155 | P. Clauss | 11/09/1897 | New South Wales |
| 156 | P. Hart | 11/09/1897 | New South Wales |
| 157 | Jack Lamb | 11/09/1897 | New South Wales |
| 158 | Albert Callan | 23/07/1898 | New South Wales |
| 159 | Patrick Carew | 23/07/1898 | New South Wales |
| 160 | Puddin Colton | 23/07/1898 | New South Wales |
| 161 | Leo Oxenham | 23/07/1898 | New South Wales |
| 162 | Frank Craig | 30/07/1898 | New South Wales |
| 163 | Arthur Corfe | 27/08/1898 | New South Wales |
| 164 | H. A. Harricks | 27/08/1898 | New South Wales |
| 165 | Lou Grealey | 10/06/1899 | New South Wales |
| 166 | John Lewis | 10/06/1899 | New South Wales |
| 167 | Rex Kennedy | 14/06/1899 | New South Wales |
| 168 | E. G. Kent | 1/07/1899 | Great Britain |
| 169 | Thomas Ward | 1/07/1899 | Great Britain |
| 170 | John Anderson | 8/07/1899 | New South Wales |
| 171 | Bill Bennett | 8/07/1899 | New South Wales |
| 172 | Alec Henry | 8/07/1899 | New South Wales |
| 173 | Archie Dennis | 14/07/1900 | New South Wales |
| 174 | C. J. Freestone | 14/07/1900 | New South Wales |
| 175 | Jack Hindmarsh | 14/07/1900 | New South Wales |
| 176 | Frank Nicholson | 14/07/1900 | New South Wales |
| 177 | Ned Pace | 14/07/1900 | New South Wales |
| 178 | Lonnie Spragg | 14/07/1900 | New South Wales |
| 179 | Jack Walsh | 14/07/1900 | New South Wales |
| 180 | Don Gillies | 17/07/1900 | Sydney Metropolitan |
| 181 | Bill Hodgkinson | 17/07/1900 | Sydney Metropolitan |
| 182 | Doug McLean Sr. | 17/07/1900 | Sydney Metropolitan |
| 183 | Arthur Pace | 17/07/1900 | Sydney Metropolitan |
| 184 | Lew Evans | 01/09/1900 | New South Wales |
| 185 | Tassie Long | 13/07/1901 | New South Wales |
| 186 | Jack O'Connor | 13/07/1901 | New South Wales |
| 187 | Arthur Cripps | 24/08/1901 | New South Wales |
| 188 | Percy Redwood | 24/08/1901 | New South Wales |
| 189 | E. Christensen | 31/08/1901 | New South Wales |
| 190 | George Thomas | 31/08/1901 | New South Wales |
| 191 | Lofty Anderson | 12/07/1902 | New South Wales |
| 192 | E. H. Lissner | 12/07/1902 | New South Wales |
| 193 | Jack Meibusch | 12/07/1902 | New South Wales |
| 194 | Allen Oxlade | 19/07/1902 | New South Wales |
| 195 | Alex McKinnon | 30/08/1902 | New South Wales |
| 196 | Tom Bird | 11/07/1903 | New South Wales |
| 197 | Jack Curran | 11/07/1903 | New South Wales |
| 198 | Micky Dore | 11/07/1903 | New South Wales |
| 199 | Charlie Redwood | 11/07/1903 | New South Wales |
| 200 | Billy Richards | 11/07/1903 | New South Wales |
| 201 | Bert St. John | 11/07/1903 | New South Wales |
| 202 | E. G. Sampson | 15/07/1903 | New South Wales |
| 203 | George Holmes | 01/08/1903 | New Zealand |
| 204 | Arthur Scott | 08/08/1903 | New Zealand |
| 205 | Otto Bestman | 05/09/1903 | New South Wales |
| 206 | Phil Carmichael | 05/09/1903 | New South Wales |
| 207 | Joe Murdock | 12/09/1903 | New South Wales |
| 208 | Fred Nicholson | 12/09/1903 | New South Wales |
| 209 | Eddie Martin | 05/09/1903 | New South Wales |
| 210 | Blue Dixon | 11/06/1904 | New South Wales |
| 211 | Edmund Dore | 11/06/1904 | New South Wales |
| 212 | Phil Hassett | 11/06/1904 | New South Wales |
| 213 | Voy Oxenham | 11/06/1904 | New South Wales |
| 214 | Ned O'Brien | 15/06/1904 | New South Wales |
| 215 | W. J. Renwick | 15/06/1904 | New South Wales |
| 216 | Pluck Pearce | 16/07/1904 | Great Britain |
| 217 | Winslow Knight | 20/08/1904 | New South Wales |
| 218 | A. Robinson | 20/08/1904 | New South Wales |
| 219 | John Wilson | 20/08/1904 | New South Wales |
| 220 | Mickey Callan | 24/06/1905 | New South Wales |
| 221 | Fred Ewald | 24/06/1905 | New South Wales |
| 222 | John Fihelly | 24/06/1905 | New South Wales |
| 223 | Peter Flanagan | 24/06/1905 | New South Wales |
| 224 | Ben Lucas | 24/06/1905 | New South Wales |
| 225 | George Watson | 24/06/1905 | New South Wales |
| 226 | Jimmy Beal | 05/08/1905 | New South Wales |
| 227 | Leo Redwood | 05/08/1905 | New South Wales |
| 228 | Charlie Simpson | 05/08/1905 | New South Wales |
| 229 | Jack Garry | 12/08/1905 | New South Wales |
| 230 | Syd Schwilk | 12/08/1905 | New South Wales |
| 231 | Frank Ahearn | 23/06/1906 | New South Wales |
| 232 | Roy Brown | 23/06/1906 | New South Wales |
| 233 | William Canniffe | 23/06/1906 | New South Wales |
| 234 | George Gutteridge | 23/06/1906 | New South Wales |
| 235 | Bill Kinghorn | 23/06/1906 | New South Wales |
| 236 | Esmond Parkinson | 23/06/1906 | New South Wales |
| 237 | Arthur Jansen | 30/06/1906 | New South Wales |
| 238 | Joe Carmichael | 14/07/1906 | New South Wales |
| 239 | Joe Bell | 21/07/1906 | New South Wales |
| 240 | Barney Gallagher | 08/06/1907 | New South Wales |
| 241 | W. H. Brighton | 08/06/1907 | New South Wales |
| 242 | Fred Cleeve | 08/06/1907 | New South Wales |
| 243 | E. L. Buchanan | 29/06/1907 | New South Wales |
| 244 | Doug Corrie | 06/07/1907 | New South Wales |
| 245 | Jack Shea | 06/07/1907 | New South Wales |
| 246 | Bob Tubman | 24/07/1907 | New Zealand |
| 247 | Norm Heaslop | 27/07/1907 | New Zealand |
| 248 | Leonard Brown | 20/06/1908 | New South Wales |
| 249 | Bully Carroll | 20/06/1908 | New South Wales |
| 250 | William Dixon | 20/06/1908 | New South Wales |
| 251 | Dandy Egan | 20/06/1908 | New South Wales |
| 252 | Jack Egan | 20/06/1908 | New South Wales |
| 253 | Brickey Farmer | 20/06/1908 | New South Wales |
| 254 | Trixie Lewis | 20/06/1908 | New South Wales |
| 255 | Tom Richards | 20/06/1908 | New South Wales |
| 256 | Charlie Woodhead | 18/07/1908 | New South Wales |
| 257 | Chas Brown | 25/07/1908 | New South Wales |
| 258 | Jack Luddy | 25/07/1908 | New South Wales |
| 259 | Simon McLennan | 25/07/1908 | New South Wales |
| 260 | Albert Scanlan | 25/07/1908 | New South Wales |
| 261 | John Cunningham | 26/08/1908 | Anglo-Welsh XV |
| 262 | Arthur Gray | 26/08/1908 | Anglo-Welsh XV |
| 263 | Bob Hammond | 26/08/1908 | Anglo-Welsh XV |
| 264 | Tom Maher | 26/08/1908 | Anglo-Welsh XV |
| 265 | Jack McLaren | 26/08/1908 | Anglo-Welsh XV |
| 266 | Pat Murphy | 26/08/1908 | Anglo-Welsh XV |
| 267 | Fred Pill | 26/08/1908 | Anglo-Welsh XV |
| 268 | George Bretherton | 03/07/1909 | New South Wales |
| 269 | Dinny Guilfoyle, Sr. | 03/07/1909 | New South Wales |
| 270 | Copper Kent | 03/07/1909 | New South Wales |
| 271 | Dan O'Sullivan | 03/07/1909 | New South Wales |
| 272 | Bill Roe | 03/07/1909 | New South Wales |
| 273 | Jack Spillane | 03/07/1909 | New South Wales |
| 274 | E. Stanley | 03/07/1909 | New South Wales |
| 275 | Abby Thomson | 03/07/1909 | New South Wales |
| 276 | Herb McCabe | 10/07/1909 | New South Wales |
| 277 | Alex Bolewski | 31/07/1909 | New South Wales |
| 278 | Walter Bolewski | 31/07/1909 | New South Wales |
| 279 | August Scholtz | 31/07/1909 | New South Wales |
| 280 | Loch Simpson | 31/07/1909 | New South Wales |
| 281 | Frederick Timbury | 31/07/1909 | New South Wales |
| 282 | Charlie Green | 07/08/1909 | New South Wales |
| 283 | George Page | 07/08/1909 | New South Wales |
| 284 | Frank Atthow | 28/05/1910 | New South Wales |
| 285 | C. Emmerson | 28/05/1910 | New South Wales |
| 286 | Bill Marston | 28/05/1910 | New South Wales |
| 287 | L. V. Shaw | 28/05/1910 | New South Wales |
| 288 | Tom Shields | 28/05/1910 | New South Wales |
| 289 | Bill Swenson | 28/05/1910 | New South Wales |
| 290 | W. J. Tucker | 28/05/1910 | New South Wales |
| 291 | Sam Topham | 01/06/1910 | New South Wales |
| 292 | Don Gunn | 11/06/1910 | New Zealand Maori |
| 293 | Bluey Thompson | 11/06/1910 | New Zealand Maori |
| 294 | Ernie Benbow | 18/06/1910 | New Zealand |
| 295 | Vin Carmichael | 22/06/1910 | New Zealand |
| 296 | J. Kilby | 09/07/1910 | New South Wales |
| 297 | Vernon Cameron | 29/07/1911 | New South Wales |
| 298 | Peter Cunningham | 29/07/1911 | New South Wales |
| 299 | Alex Dingwall | 29/07/1911 | New South Wales |
| 300 | John Fitzhardinge | 29/07/1911 | New South Wales |
| 301 | Michael McMahon | 29/07/1911 | New South Wales |
| 302 | Ralph Scott | 29/07/1911 | New South Wales |
| 303 | Sven Svenson | 29/07/1911 | New South Wales |
| 304 | H. L. Kent | 05/08/1911 | New South Wales |
| 305 | Charlie Meekin | 05/08/1911 | New South Wales |
| 306 | Bob Meibusch | 05/08/1911 | New South Wales |
| 307 | Tom Ryan | 05/08/1911 | New South Wales |
| 308 | Bob Willcocks | 05/08/1911 | New South Wales |
| 309 | Herb Callaghan | 19/08/1911 | New South Wales |
| 310 | Hugh Flynn | 19/08/1911 | New South Wales |
| 311 | C. White | 19/08/1911 | New South Wales |
| 312 | C. Wilson | 22/08/1911 | New South Wales |
| 313 | Jimmy Flynn | 22/06/1912 | New South Wales |
| 314 | Charles Hodgens | 22/06/1912 | New South Wales |
| 315 | William Murphy | 22/06/1912 | New South Wales |
| 316 | Frank Rigby | 22/06/1912 | New South Wales |
| 317 | David Williams | 22/06/1912 | New South Wales |
| 318 | Lou Meibusch | 29/06/1912 | New South Wales |
| 319 | Bunny Newell | 29/06/1912 | New South Wales |
| 320 | Ted Eastmann | 14/06/1913 | New Zealand Maori |
| 321 | Len Foote | 14/06/1913 | New Zealand Maori |
| 322 | Tiger McManis | 14/06/1913 | New Zealand Maori |
| 323 | Harry Stumm | 14/06/1913 | New Zealand Maori |
| 324 | Clinker Birt | 19/07/1913 | New South Wales |
| 325 | Albert Carroll | 19/07/1913 | New South Wales |
| 326 | A. W. Dick | 19/07/1913 | New South Wales |
| 327 | Sandy Horodam | 19/07/1913 | New South Wales |
| 328 | William Kenyon | 19/07/1913 | New South Wales |
| 329 | Norman Lloyd | 14/06/1913 | New Zealand Maori |
| 330 | Joe Russell | 19/07/1913 | New South Wales |
| 331 | C. J. Magee | 19/07/1913 | New South Wales |
| 332 | Sonny Fraser | 26/07/1913 | New South Wales |
| 333 | Tom Haller | 26/07/1913 | New South Wales |
| 334 | Jack Hanley | 26/07/1913 | New South Wales |
| 335 | Frank Lewis | 26/07/1913 | New South Wales |
| 336 | Bill Bawden | 02/08/1913 | New South Wales |
| 337 | Bill Larcombe | 02/08/1913 | New South Wales |
| 338 | William Morrissey | 09/08/1913 | New South Wales |
| 339 | Mick Ahern | 30/05/1914 | New South Wales |
| 340 | James Byrnes | 30/05/1914 | New South Wales |
| 341 | Roy Chambers | 30/05/1914 | New South Wales |
| 342 | Viv Cooper | 30/05/1914 | New South Wales |
| 343 | Sidney Cumes | 30/05/1914 | New South Wales |
| 344 | F. Stanfield | 30/05/1914 | New South Wales |
| 345 | George Brown | 06/06/1914 | New South Wales |
| 346 | Clarrie Crawford | 06/06/1914 | New South Wales |
| 347 | Eric Francis | 06/06/1914 | New South Wales |
| 348 | Bert Perkins | 06/06/1914 | New South Wales |
| 349 | Allan Row | 06/06/1914 | New South Wales |
| 350 | Ray Smith | 13/06/1914 | New South Wales |
| 351 | Bill Smith | 17/06/1914 | Sydney |
| 352 | Stanley Francis | 25/07/1914 | New Zealand |
| 353 | George Green | 25/07/1914 | New Zealand |
| 354 | Bill Park | 25/07/1914 | New Zealand |
| 355 | Leslie Wilson | 25/07/1914 | New Zealand |
| 356 | Samuel Kreutzer | 29/07/1914 | New Zealand |
| 357 | William Oehlmann | 29/07/1914 | New Zealand |
| 358 | Fred Swenson | 29/07/1914 | New Zealand |
| 359 | William Breen | 19/07/1919 | Australian Imperial Forces |
| 360 | Vic Clarkson | 19/07/1919 | Australian Imperial Forces |
| 361 | Bill Cotter | 19/07/1919 | Australian Imperial Forces |
| 362 | W. Field | 19/07/1919 | Australian Imperial Forces |
| 363 | Leslie Gall | 19/07/1919 | Australian Imperial Forces |
| 364 | Bernard Herzig | 19/07/1919 | Australian Imperial Forces |
| 365 | H. Kelleher | 19/07/1919 | Australian Imperial Forces |
| 366 | Tom Lawton, Sr. | 19/07/1919 | Australian Imperial Forces |
| 367 | Thomas Mooney | 19/07/1919 | Australian Imperial Forces |
| 368 | Vince Mooney | 19/07/1919 | Australian Imperial Forces |
| 369 | Dick Murray | 19/07/1919 | Australian Imperial Forces |
| 370 | Brian O'Sullivan | 19/07/1919 | Australian Imperial Forces |
| 371 | A. Traill | 19/07/1919 | Australian Imperial Forces |
| 372 | Tom Flanagan | 04/08/1919 | New South Wales |
| 373 | Vic Grenning | 04/08/1919 | New South Wales |
| 374 | Jack Liddy | 04/08/1919 | New South Wales |
| 375 | A. M. Lyons | 04/08/1919 | New South Wales |
| 376 | Stanilaus Ryan | 04/08/1919 | New South Wales |
| 377 | G. Webster | 09/08/1919 | New South Wales |
| 378 | Duncan Fowles | 23/08/1919 | New South Wales |
| 379 | John Halferty | 23/08/1919 | New South Wales |
| 380 | Peter Williams | 23/08/1919 | New South Wales |
| 381 | Roy Kent | 30/08/1919 | New South Wales |
| 382 | Jack Bayada | 18/05/1929 | New South Wales |
| 383 | Eddie Bonis | 18/05/1929 | New South Wales |
| 384 | T. Brown | 18/05/1929 | New South Wales |
| 385 | W. Burns | 18/05/1929 | New South Wales |
| 386 | J. Cloherty | 18/05/1929 | New South Wales |
| 387 | Len Crisp | 18/05/1929 | New South Wales |
| 388 | Harry Hamalainen | 18/05/1929 | New South Wales |
| 389 | Jack King | 18/05/1929 | New South Wales |
| 390 | P. Marsh | 18/05/1929 | New South Wales |
| 391 | Robert Miles | 18/05/1929 | New South Wales |
| 392 | M. Sheehan | 18/05/1929 | New South Wales |
| 393 | Eddie Thompson | 18/05/1929 | New South Wales |
| 394 | Max White | 18/05/1929 | New South Wales |
| 395 | Gary Pearson | 22/05/1929 | Sydney Metropolitan |
| 396 | G. M. Ward | 22/05/1929 | Sydney Metropolitan |
| 397 | Cecil Adair | 01/06/1929 | New South Wales |
| 398 | Andy Frizzell | 01/06/1929 | New South Wales |
| 399 | Frank Larkin | 22/05/1929 | Sydney Metropolitan |
| 400 | Gordon McGhie | 01/06/1929 | New South Wales |
| 401 | L. Phillips | 01/06/1929 | New South Wales |
| 402 | T. Thorsbourne | 01/06/1929 | New South Wales |
| 403 | J. Woodward | 01/06/1929 | New South Wales |
| 404 | H. Hebb | 03/06/1929 | New South Wales |
| 405 | Henry St. John | 03/06/1929 | New South Wales |
| 406 | J. Long | 24/07/1929 | New Zealand |
| 407 | Len Arnell | 31/05/1930 | New South Wales |
| 408 | Pat Banks | 31/05/1930 | New South Wales |
| 409 | Frank Broadfoot | 31/05/1930 | New South Wales |
| 410 | Bernie Brown | 31/05/1930 | New South Wales |
| 411 | Kenneth Carmichael | 31/05/1930 | New South Wales |
| 412 | Tom Casey | 31/05/1930 | New South Wales |
| 413 | Eric Channer | 31/05/1930 | New South Wales |
| 414 | Jimmy Clark | 31/05/1930 | New South Wales |
| 415 | John Ritter | 31/05/1930 | New South Wales |
| 416 | Fred Whyatt | 31/05/1930 | New South Wales |
| 417 | R. Battershill | 07/06/1930 | New South Wales |
| 418 | W. Massey-White | 07/06/1930 | New South Wales |
| 419 | Edgar Mott | 07/06/1930 | New South Wales |
| 420 | Jack Steggall | 07/06/1930 | New South Wales |
| 421 | Clem England | 30/07/1930 | North-West |
| 422 | W. Kelleher | 30/07/1930 | North-West |
| 423 | Frank Reville | 30/07/1930 | North-West |
| 424 | V. Woodward | 30/07/1930 | North-West |
| 425 | Bernie Doneley | 30/07/1930 | North-West |
| 426 | Walter Bennett | 02/08/1930 | New South Wales |
| 427 | J. Carter | 02/08/1930 | Great Britain |
| 428 | Eddie Felgenhauer | 02/08/1930 | Great Britain |
| 429 | Ken Suter | 30/05/1931 | New South Wales |
| 430 | Lyn Wood | 30/05/1931 | New South Wales |
| 431 | Dooney Hayes | 06/06/1931 | New South Wales |
| 432 | Fitzgerald Vincent | 06/06/1931 | New South Wales |
| 433 | Bill White | 06/06/1931 | New South Wales |
| 434 | Ron Yeates | 06/06/1931 | New South Wales |
| 435 | Phil Clark | 06/06/1931 | New South Wales |
| 436 | Frank Arnell, Sr. | 22/07/1931 | Newcastle |
| 437 | Jack East | 22/07/1931 | Newcastle |
| 438 | Wally Lewis | 22/07/1931 | Newcastle |
| 439 | Roy Lindsay | 22/07/1931 | Newcastle |
| 440 | Chas Brown | 07/05/1932 | New South Wales |
| 441 | Graham Cooke | 07/05/1932 | New South Wales |
| 442 | Joseph Doyle | 14/05/1932 | New South Wales |
| 443 | Jack Williams | 09/07/1932 | New Zealand |
| 444 | R. W. Jeffrey | 13/08/1932 | New South Wales |
| 445 | Doug McLean Jr. | 13/08/1932 | New South Wales |
| 446 | Len Barber | 17/08/1932 | Rest of Australia |
| 447 | Derick Nicholson | 17/08/1932 | Rest of Australia |
| 448 | Bill Warlow | 17/08/1932 | Rest of Australia |
| 449 | Vince Bermingham | 24/06/1933 | New South Wales |
| 450 | Bob Chester | 24/06/1933 | New South Wales |
| 451 | Keith Eason | 24/06/1933 | New South Wales |
| 452 | Tom Green | 24/06/1933 | New South Wales |
| 453 | Cyril McCarthy | 24/06/1933 | New South Wales |
| 454 | James Minnis | 24/06/1933 | New South Wales |
| 455 | C. S. Wilson | 24/06/1933 | New South Wales |
| 456 | Donald Buchanan | 01/07/1933 | New South Wales |
| 457 | Vince Dore | 01/07/1933 | New South Wales |
| 458 | F. Sammon | 01/07/1933 | New South Wales |
| 459 | C. H. Smith | 01/07/1933 | New South Wales |
| 460 | Joe Costello | 12/08/1933 | New South Wales |
| 461 | G. L. G. Holmes | 12/08/1933 | New South Wales |
| 462 | Charles Lee | 12/08/1933 | New South Wales |
| 463 | Les East | 14/08/1933 | New South Wales |
| 464 | George Allen | 14/08/1933 | New South Wales |
| 465 | J. Callaghan | 14/08/1933 | New South Wales |
| 466 | Harry Cook | 02/06/1934 | New South Wales |
| 467 | Martin Cullen | 02/06/1934 | New South Wales |
| 468 | Max Muller | 30/06/1934 | New South Wales |
| 469 | Patrick Dixon | 02/07/1934 | New South Wales Colts |
| 470 | G. Hall | 02/07/1934 | New South Wales Colts |
| 471 | Felix Doyle | 04/05/1935 | New South Wales |
| 472 | Bernie Howard | 04/05/1935 | New South Wales |
| 473 | Neil Ward | 04/05/1935 | New South Wales |
| 474 | Vay Wilson | 04/05/1935 | New South Wales |
| 475 | Eric Browne | 06/05/1935 | New South Wales |
| 476 | Joe French | 06/05/1935 | New South Wales |
| 477 | E. C. James | 06/05/1935 | New South Wales |
| 478 | E. J. Diery | 01/06/1935 | New South Wales |
| 479 | Noel Hall | 01/06/1935 | New South Wales |
| 480 | John Tully | 03/06/1935 | New South Wales |
| 481 | Johnny Kirwan | 03/06/1935 | New South Wales |
| 482 | Ronald Atkinson | 20/07/1935 | New Zealand Maori |
| 483 | Jimmy Bowers | 23/05/1936 | New South Wales |
| 484 | Ray Larsen | 23/05/1936 | New South Wales |
| 485 | Boyd Oxlade | 23/05/1936 | New South Wales |
| 486 | Stuart Tuck | 23/05/1936 | New South Wales |
| 487 | Ron Meibusch | 30/05/1936 | New South Wales |
| 488 | Roy Stewart | 30/05/1936 | New South Wales |
| 489 | Cyril Andrews | 04/07/1936 | New South Wales |
| 490 | Chappie Schulte | 04/07/1936 | New South Wales |
| 491 | Hughie Bowers | 08/07/1936 | Victoria |
| 492 | Terry Brown | 08/07/1936 | Victoria |
| 493 | Les Garthe | 04/07/1936 | New South Wales |
| 494 | Harry Hansford | 04/07/1936 | New South Wales |
| 495 | John Newman | 08/07/1936 | Victoria |
| 496 | Alan Wildman | 08/07/1936 | Victoria |
| 497 | Dick Ebbern | 12/05/1937 | New South Wales |
| 498 | Geoff Horan | 01/05/1937 | New South Wales |
| 499 | Jack Howard | 01/05/1937 | New South Wales |
| 500 | Stan Keates | 01/05/1937 | New South Wales |
| 501 | Jack McDonald | 01/05/1937 | New South Wales |
| 502 | Ron McDonald | 15/05/1937 | New South Wales |
| 503 | Len Walker | 01/05/1937 | New South Wales |
| 504 | John O'Shea | 01/05/1937 | New South Wales |
| 505 | Bob Bentley | 10/07/1937 | South Africa |
| 506 | William Douglas | 10/07/1937 | South Africa |
| 507 | Col Hockings | 10/07/1937 | South Africa |
| 508 | Bill Monti | 10/07/1937 | South Africa |
| 509 | Jack Gibbs | 30/04/1938 | New South Wales |
| 510 | Winston Ide | 30/04/1938 | New South Wales |
| 511 | Chick McNamara | 30/04/1938 | New South Wales |
| 512 | Max Stark | 30/04/1938 | New South Wales |
| 513 | Les Walker | 30/04/1938 | New South Wales |
| 514 | Mal Creed | 11/06/1938 | New South Wales |
| 515 | George Denman | 11/06/1938 | New South Wales |
| 516 | Allan Eason | 11/06/1938 | New South Wales |
| 517 | Don Rodger | 11/06/1938 | New South Wales |
| 518 | S. C. Jones | 13/06/1938 | New South Wales |
| 519 | Vaux Nicholson | 13/06/1938 | New South Wales |
| 520 | Roger Salter | 30/07/1938 | New Zealand |
| 521 | Jack Comerford | 20/05/1939 | New South Wales |
| 522 | Allan Livermore | 20/05/1939 | New South Wales |
| 523 | Bill McLean | 20/05/1939 | New South Wales |
| 524 | Andy Vogel | 20/05/1939 | New South Wales |
| 525 | Tom McNeill | 10/06/1939 | New South Wales |
| 526 | Jimmy Arundel | 23/08/1941 | Australian Combined Services |
| 527 | Kevin Bourke | 23/08/1941 | Australian Combined Services |
| 528 | Kevin Desmond | 23/08/1941 | Australian Combined Services |
| 529 | Bill Gardiner | 23/08/1941 | Australian Combined Services |
| 530 | Harry Jefferies | 23/08/1941 | Australian Combined Services |
| 531 | Eric Johnson | 23/08/1941 | Australian Combined Services |
| 532 | Frank Keefe | 23/08/1941 | Australian Combined Services |
| 533 | Jack Keim | 23/08/1941 | Australian Combined Services |
| 534 | Jack McLean | 23/08/1941 | Australian Combined Services |
| 535 | Bill Morrison | 23/08/1941 | Australian Combined Services |
| 536 | Jimmy Sheehan | 23/08/1941 | Australian Combined Services |
| 537 | Eddie Ahern | 18/08/1945 | New South Wales |
| 538 | Murray Batt | 18/08/1945 | New South Wales |
| 539 | Jack Boniface | 18/08/1945 | New South Wales |
| 540 | Roscoe Fay | 18/08/1945 | New South Wales |
| 541 | Henry Flanagan | 18/08/1945 | New South Wales |
| 542 | Rex Kennedy | 18/08/1945 | New South Wales |
| 543 | Larry Lowth | 18/08/1945 | New South Wales |
| 544 | Ian McKellar | 18/08/1945 | New South Wales |
| 545 | Bryan O'Connell | 18/08/1945 | New South Wales |
| 546 | Malcolm Quartermass | 18/08/1945 | New South Wales |
| 547 | Allan Ware | 18/08/1945 | New South Wales |
| 548 | Clem Windsor | 18/08/1945 | New South Wales |
| 549 | Keith Winning | 18/08/1945 | New South Wales |
| 550 | Kevin Hodda | 15/06/1946 | New South Wales |
| 551 | Alexander Leslie | 15/06/1946 | New South Wales |
| 552 | Roy Lostroh | 15/06/1946 | New South Wales |
| 553 | Bob McMaster | 15/06/1946 | New South Wales |
| 554 | Keith Rutkin | 15/06/1946 | New South Wales |
| 555 | Graham Wildman | 15/06/1946 | New South Wales |
| 556 | Peter Bridgman | 17/06/1946 | New South Wales |
| 557 | Victor Carroll | 24/07/1946 | New England |
| 558 | John Dean | 24/07/1946 | New England |
| 559 | Daryl Johnstone | 24/07/1946 | New England |
| 560 | John Kirk | 24/07/1946 | New England |
| 561 | George Nosovich | 24/07/1946 | New England |
| 562 | John Fogarty | 05/05/1947 | New South Wales |
| 563 | Patrick Harvey | 05/05/1947 | New South Wales |
| 564 | Johnny Irwin | 05/05/1947 | New South Wales |
| 565 | Wal Mason | 05/05/1947 | New South Wales |
| 566 | Eddie Broad | 10/05/1947 | New South Wales |
| 567 | Alan Lemon | 10/05/1947 | New South Wales |
| 568 | Bill Wilson | 10/05/1947 | New South Wales |
| 569 | Jack Perry | 21/05/1947 | New England |
| 570 | Rex Proctor | 21/05/1947 | New England |
| 571 | Neville Cottrell Sr. | 18/06/1947 | New Zealand |
| 572 | Percy Marsh | 18/06/1947 | New Zealand |
| 573 | Neil Betts | 16/05/1948 | Wallabies |
| 574 | Ian Clark | 16/05/1948 | Wallabies |
| 575 | William Maloney | 16/05/1948 | Wallabies |
| 576 | Earle Meredith | 16/05/1948 | Wallabies |
| 577 | Thomas Ryan | 16/05/1948 | Wallabies |
| 578 | Doug Wildman | 16/05/1948 | Wallabies |
| 579 | Doug Anthony | 09/06/1948 | New England |
| 580 | Jimmy Bourke | 09/06/1948 | New England |
| 581 | Paul Costello | 09/06/1948 | New England |
| 582 | Stewie Gray | 09/06/1948 | New England |
| 583 | Fabian McCarthy | 09/06/1948 | New England |
| 584 | William McGovern | 09/06/1948 | New England |
| 585 | Peter Neilsen | 09/06/1948 | New England |
| 586 | Kev Maccheroni | 12/06/1948 | New South Wales |
| 587 | Col McCallum | 16/06/1948 | Western Districts |
| 588 | Peter Thompson | 21/08/1948 | New South Wales |
| 589 | Kevin Betts | 06/09/1948 | Newcastle |
| 590 | Harry Clancy | 06/09/1948 | Newcastle |
| 591 | Viv Hancock | 06/09/1948 | Newcastle |
| 592 | William Beckett | 14/05/1949 | New South Wales |
| 593 | Val Head | 14/05/1949 | New South Wales |
| 594 | Ian MacMillan | 14/05/1949 | New South Wales |
| 595 | Duncan Robertson | 14/05/1949 | New South Wales |
| 596 | Gordon Marles | 16/05/1949 | New South Wales |
| 597 | Jack Otago | 16/05/1949 | New South Wales |
| 598 | Reg Fuller | 30/07/1949 | New South Wales |
| 599 | Merv Rosenthal | 30/07/1949 | New South Wales |
| 600 | Kev Spillane | 30/07/1949 | New South Wales |
| 601 | Bill Laver | 01/08/1949 | New South Wales |
| 602 | John Patane | 01/08/1949 | New South Wales |
| 603 | Alf Dalzell | 10/06/1950 | New South Wales |
| 604 | Dan Griffin | 10/06/1950 | New South Wales |
| 605 | Dinny Guilfoyle, Jr. | 10/06/1950 | New South Wales |
| 606 | Tom Maccheroni | 10/06/1950 | New South Wales |
| 607 | Ian Nicol | 10/06/1950 | New South Wales |
| 608 | Jack Boast | 29/07/1950 | Victoria |
| 609 | Ian Brusasco | 29/07/1950 | Victoria |
| 610 | Trevor Leisegang | 29/07/1950 | Victoria |
| 611 | Ray Colbert | 29/07/1950 | Victoria |
| 612 | Peter Robinson | 29/07/1950 | Victoria |
| 613 | Kevin Crowe | 09/05/1951 | New South Wales |
| 614 | Howard Hickey | 09/05/1951 | New South Wales |
| 615 | Garth Jones | 09/05/1951 | New South Wales |
| 616 | Alan Morcombe | 09/05/1951 | New South Wales |
| 617 | Conrad Primmer | 09/05/1951 | New South Wales |
| 618 | Jack Seip | 09/05/1951 | New South Wales |
| 619 | John Carroll | 12/05/1951 | New South Wales |
| 620 | John Raff | 12/05/1951 | New South Wales |
| 621 | Steven Smith | 09/06/1951 | New South Wales |
| 622 | John Buchanan | 11/06/1951 | New South Wales |
| 623 | Raymond McNamara | 11/06/1951 | New South Wales |
| 624 | Ray Clark | 06/06/1952 | New South Wales |
| 625 | Colin Forbes | 06/06/1952 | New South Wales |
| 626 | Ashley Girle | 06/06/1952 | New South Wales |
| 627 | Peter Heenan | 06/06/1952 | New South Wales |
| 628 | Gavan Horsley | 06/06/1952 | New South Wales |
| 629 | John O'Neill | 06/06/1952 | New South Wales |
| 630 | Thomas Sweeney | 06/06/1952 | New South Wales |
| 631 | R. Shelvey | 06/06/1952 | New South Wales |
| 632 | Tom Corcoran | 09/06/1952 | New South Wales |
| 633 | Brian Menkens | 09/06/1952 | New South Wales |
| 634 | K. Gould | 21/06/1952 | New South Wales |
| 635 | Ainslie Sheil | 21/06/1952 | New South Wales |
| 636 | Dave Meldrum | 23/06/1952 | New South Wales |
| 637 | Bill Muller | 19/07/1952 | Fiji |
| 638 | Chilla Wilson | 23/06/1952 | New South Wales |
| 639 | Lon Hatherell | 19/07/1952 | Fiji |
| 640 | Bruce Mills | 20/07/1953 | Fiji |
| 641 | Rex Freudenberg | 29/04/1953 | New South Wales |
| 642 | Jeff Michelmore | 29/04/1953 | New South Wales |
| 643 | Bernie Deignan | 02/05/1953 | New South Wales |
| 644 | Jim Nickles | 17/08/1953 | Wallabies 2 |
| 645 | Graham Baumber | 05/05/1954 | Newcastle |
| 646 | Glen Sheil | 04/05/1953 | Newcastle |
| 647 | Arthur Apelt | 04/05/1953 | Newcastle |
| 648 | Sid Cantamessa | 17/08/1953 | Wallabies |
| 649 | John Ellis | 17/08/1953 | Wallabies 2 |
| 650 | Bryan Kassulke | 17/08/1953 | Wallabies 2 |
| 651 | John Riley | 17/08/1953 | Wallabies 2 |
| 652 | Jimmy Smith | 17/08/1953 | Wallabies 2 |
| 653 | Paul Swepson | 17/08/1953 | Wallabies 2 |
| 654 | Jim Thompson | 17/08/1953 | Wallabies 2 |
| 655 | Des Connor | 11/05/1954 | New South Wales |
| 656 | Paul Mooney | 11/05/1954 | New South Wales |
| 657 | Tom O'Brien | 31/07/1954 | Newcastle |
| 658 | Kevin Ryan | 11/05/1954 | New South Wales |
| 659 | Don Watt | 11/05/1954 | New South Wales |
| 660 | Barry Wright | 29/05/1954 | Fiji |
| 661 | Noel Crozier | 31/07/1954 | Newcastle |
| 662 | Eddie O'Brien | 11/05/1954 | New South Wales |
| 663 | Robin Shaw | 31/07/1954 | Newcastle |
| 664 | Francis Brew | 21/05/1955 | New South Wales |
| 665 | Kerry Larkin | 21/05/1955 | New South Wales |
| 666 | Kev McMahon | 21/05/1955 | New South Wales |
| 667 | Howard Southgate | 21/05/1955 | New South Wales |
| 668 | Maurice Williamson | 23/05/1955 | New South Wales |
| 669 | Len Forbes | 13/07/1955 | Sydney Metropolitan |
| 670 | Fraser Thompson | 13/07/1955 | Sydney Metropolitan |
| 671 | John Clark | 02/05/1956 | New South Wales |
| 672 | Paul Comerford | 02/05/1956 | New South Wales |
| 673 | Paul Sweeney | 02/05/1956 | New South Wales |
| 674 | Kenelm Waller | 02/05/1956 | New South Wales |
| 675 | Thomas Baxter | 29/05/1956 | South Africa |
| 676 | Andrew Purcell | 29/05/1956 | South Africa |
| 677 | Gray McLean | 24/06/1956 | New England |
| 678 | Kevin Brash | 24/06/1956 | New England |
| 679 | Peter James | 24/06/1956 | New England |
| 680 | Jim Paskin | 24/06/1956 | New England |
| 681 | Max Phelan | 09/05/1957 | New South Wales |
| 682 | Robert Rex | 24/06/1956 | New England |
| 683 | Ken Donald | 09/05/1957 | New South Wales |
| 684 | Brian Ford | 09/05/1957 | New South Wales |
| 685 | Joe Gilbert | 09/05/1957 | New South Wales |
| 686 | Don Hosking | 11/05/1957 | New South Wales |
| 687 | Ray Swan | 11/05/1957 | New South Wales |
| 688 | Vince Hogan | 28/05/1957 | New Zealand |
| 689 | Bill Flamstead | 19/08/1957 | South Australia |
| 690 | Michael Knowles | 19/08/1957 | South Australia |
| 691 | John Harris | 21/08/1957 | Victoria |
| 692 | Alister Boyd | 21/05/1958 | New South Wales |
| 693 | Joe Flynn | 21/05/1958 | New South Wales |
| 694 | Bob Cory | 24/05/1958 | New South Wales |
| 695 | Harry Roberts | 24/05/1958 | New South Wales |
| 696 | John Cleary | 11/06/1958 | New Zealand Maori |
| 697 | Travis Lindenmayer | 11/06/1958 | New Zealand Maori |
| 698 | Ray Smith | 11/06/1958 | New Zealand Maori |
| 699 | David Bedgood | 16/07/1958 | Victoria |
| 700 | Berrick Boyd | 20/05/1959 | New South Wales |
| 701 | David Connors | 20/05/1959 | New South Wales |
| 702 | John Hamilton | 20/05/1959 | New South Wales |
| 703 | Don Worner | 20/05/1959 | New South Wales |
| 704 | Bob Latukefu | 23/05/1959 | New South Wales |
| 705 | Des Ridley | 23/05/1959 | New South Wales |
| 706 | Kevin Fitzpatrick | 02/06/1959 | British Lions |
| 707 | Alan Rissman | 02/06/1959 | British Lions |
| 708 | Alec Evans | 23/07/1959 | New South Wales |
| 709 | Eric Anning | 28/07/1959 | New South Wales |
| 710 | Michael Alp | 07/05/1960 | New South Wales |
| 711 | Ross Finemore | 07/05/1960 | New South Wales |
| 712 | Bill Keirnan | 07/05/1960 | New South Wales |
| 713 | Kerry Lusk | 07/05/1960 | New South Wales |
| 714 | Dion McCarthy | 07/05/1960 | New South Wales |
| 715 | Gordon Woods | 07/05/1960 | New South Wales |
| 716 | Henry Adcock | 10/05/1960 | New South Wales |
| 717 | Terry Carew | 10/05/1960 | New South Wales |
| 718 | Mick Cullinan | 07/05/1960 | New South Wales |
| 719 | Jim Dalgleish | 07/05/1960 | New South Wales |
| 720 | Gregory Ohlrich | 10/05/1960 | New South Wales |
| 721 | Gil Shearer | 09/07/1960 | New South Wales |
| 722 | Ray Dixon | 29/04/1961 | New South Wales |
| 723 | Denis Franzmann | 29/04/1961 | New South Wales |
| 724 | John Heiniger | 29/04/1961 | New South Wales |
| 725 | Trevor Lovell | 29/04/1961 | New South Wales |
| 726 | Robert Potter | 29/04/1961 | New South Wales |
| 727 | Richard Swan | 29/04/1961 | New South Wales |
| 728 | Peter Stevens | 29/04/1961 | New South Wales |
| 729 | Jimmy Carson | 02/05/1961 | New South Wales |
| 730 | Kenneth Craven | 02/05/1961 | New South Wales |
| 731 | Owen Edwards | 02/05/1961 | New South Wales |
| 732 | Paddy Knapp | 02/05/1961 | New South Wales |
| 733 | Peter Morris | 14/05/1961 | New South Wales |
| 734 | Denis Parker | 14/05/1961 | New South Wales |
| 735 | Kev Lingard | 14/05/1961 | New South Wales |
| 736 | Mick Baker | 07/06/1961 | Fiji |
| 737 | Greg Core | 07/06/1961 | Fiji |
| 738 | Lloyd McDermott | 07/06/1961 | Fiji |
| 739 | Terry Carolan | 22/08/1961 | France |
| 740 | David Clark | 22/08/1961 | France |
| 741 | Garth Hughes | 22/08/1961 | France |
| 742 | Paul Perrin | 22/08/1961 | France |
| 743 | Rob Priebe | 22/08/1961 | France |
| 744 | Frank Bennett | 22/05/1962 | New Zealand |
| 745 | Jules Guerassimoff | 22/05/1962 | New Zealand |
| 746 | Dick Marks | 22/05/1962 | New Zealand |
| 747 | Ivor Thomas | 22/05/1962 | New Zealand |
| 748 | Leo Williams | 22/05/1962 | New Zealand |
| 749 | Dallas O'Neill | 07/07/1962 | Victoria |
| 750 | Reg Sutton | 07/07/1962 | Victoria |
| 751 | Mike Slee | 10/07/1962 | New South Wales Country |
| 752 | Jeff Collins | 20/04/1963 | Manawatu |
| 753 | Peter Dawson | 20/04/1963 | Manawatu |
| 754 | Bill Gunn | 20/04/1963 | Manawatu |
| 755 | Jim Lucey | 20/04/1963 | Manawatu |
| 756 | Graham Sampford | 20/04/1963 | Manawatu |
| 757 | Barry Brown | 27/04/1963 | King Country |
| 758 | Adrian Hose | 01/05/1963 | Wanganui |
| 759 | Michael Maguire | 01/05/1963 | Wanganui |
| 760 | John Wolfe | 01/05/1963 | Wanganui |
| 761 | Morrie Dent | 11/07/1963 | New South Wales |
| 762 | Jack Duff | 11/07/1963 | New South Wales |
| 763 | Ric Trivett | 11/07/1963 | New South Wales |
| 764 | George Golding | 13/07/1963 | New South Wales |
| 765 | Ray Bruton | 11/08/1963 | Australian Combined Services |
| 766 | John Dunsdon | 11/08/1963 | Australian Combined Services |
| 767 | Bill Rainbow | 11/08/1963 | Australian Combined Services |
| 768 | Denis Sullivan | 11/08/1963 | Australian Combined Services |
| 769 | Frank Arnell, Jr. | 28/09/1963 | Wallabies 2 |
| 770 | John Hawkins | 28/09/1963 | Wallabies 2 |
| 771 | Bob Honan | 28/09/1963 | Wallabies 2 |
| 772 | Laurie Lawrence | 28/09/1963 | Wallabies 2 |
| 773 | Wayne Reilly | 20/06/1964 | Junior All Blacks |
| 774 | Darryl Latter | 02/08/1964 | New South Wales Country |
| 775 | Barrie Munro | 02/08/1964 | New South Wales Country |
| 776 | Peter Vincent | 02/08/1964 | New South Wales Country |
| 777 | Kent Warbrooke | 02/08/1964 | New South Wales Country |
| 778 | Peter Coote | 16/08/1964 | Australian Combined Services |
| 779 | Don Whittle | 16/08/1964 | Australian Combined Services |
| 780 | Ross Cullen | 02/05/1965 | New South Wales |
| 781 | Norman Mayne | 02/05/1965 | New South Wales |
| 782 | Kenneth Skerman | 02/05/1965 | New South Wales |
| 783 | David Taylor | 02/05/1965 | New South Wales |
| 784 | Michael Purcell | 05/06/1965 | New South Wales |
| 785 | Ross Teitzel | 05/06/1965 | New South Wales |
| 786 | Nev McEwan | 26/06/1965 | South Africa |
| 787 | Clive Becconsall | 11/07/1965 | University of California |
| 788 | Bernie Bindon | 11/07/1965 | University of California |
| 789 | Paul Morgan | 11/07/1965 | University of California |
| 790 | John Murphy | 11/07/1965 | University of California |
| 791 | Doug Ryan | 11/07/1965 | University of California |
| 792 | Russell Manning | 27/07/1965 | New South Wales |
| 793 | Bruce Brown | 12/08/1965 | Nadi |
| 794 | Mick Barry | 12/05/1966 | New South Wales |
| 795 | Barry Honan | 12/05/1966 | New South Wales |
| 796 | Roger Cooke | 31/05/1966 | British Isles |
| 797 | G. Campbell | 30/07/1966 | Australian Combined Services |
| 798 | David Crombie | 30/07/1966 | Australian Combined Services |
| 799 | Graham Cronk | 30/07/1966 | Australian Combined Services |
| 800 | John Hulbert | 30/07/1966 | Australian Combined Services |
| 801 | Eddie Kann | 30/07/1966 | Australian Combined Services |
| 802 | Epi Bolawaqatabua | 01/05/1967 | Ireland |
| 803 | John Costello | 01/05/1967 | Ireland |
| 804 | Stuart Gregory | 01/05/1967 | Ireland |
| 805 | Terry Shanahan | 01/05/1967 | Ireland |
| 806 | Malcolm Nutt | 22/06/1967 | Victoria |
| 807 | Dick Eagles | 13/07/1967 | New South Wales |
| 808 | Stephen McCready | 13/07/1967 | New South Wales |
| 809 | Lee McNicholl | 13/07/1967 | New South Wales |
| 810 | Alex Pope | 13/07/1967 | New South Wales |
| 811 | Keith Jennings | 13/08/1967 | Australian Combined Services |
| 812 | Bernie Warnick | 13/08/1967 | Australian Combined Services |
| 813 | Greg Price | 15/05/1968 | New South Wales Country |
| 814 | Peter Reilly | 15/05/1968 | New South Wales Country |
| 815 | Shane Sullivan | 15/05/1968 | New South Wales Country |
| 816 | Max Offner | 18/05/1968 | New South Wales |
| 817 | Keith Bell | 27/07/1968 | Sydney |
| 818 | Colin Estwick | 27/07/1968 | Sydney |
| 819 | James Creagh | 27/07/1968 | Sydney |
| 820 | Rod Kelleher | 31/07/1968 | New South Wales Country |
| 821 | David L'Estrange | 31/07/1968 | New South Wales Country |
| 822 | Errol Allan | 05/08/1968 | New South Wales |
| 823 | Ray Meagher | 14/08/1968 | France |
| 824 | Bill Andrews | 10/05/1969 | Victoria |
| 825 | David Miller | 10/05/1969 | Victoria |
| 826 | Peter Moore | 10/05/1969 | Victoria |
| 827 | Robert Wood | 10/05/1969 | Victoria |
| 828 | John Cornes | 30/07/1969 | Fiji |
| 829 | Brian Galligan | 30/07/1969 | Fiji |
| 830 | Jeff McLean | 30/07/1969 | Fiji |
| 831 | Barry White | 30/07/1969 | Fiji |
| 832 | Charlie Woodward | 30/07/1969 | Fiji |
| 833 | David Dunworth | 17/08/1969 | Australian Combined Services |
| 834 | Mick Flynn | 17/08/1969 | Australian Combined Services |
| 835 | John Neale | 17/08/1969 | Australian Combined Services |
| 836 | Alan White | 17/08/1969 | Australian Combined Services |
| 837 | Mick Freney | 13/05/1970 | New South Wales Country |
| 838 | Lloyd Graham | 13/05/1970 | New South Wales Country |
| 839 | Peter Lewis | 13/05/1970 | New South Wales Country |
| 840 | Ronald Price | 17/05/1970 | New South Wales |
| 841 | Alan Skinner | 17/05/1970 | New South Wales |
| 842 | Rob Mackay | 10/06/1970 | Mid-Canterbury |
| 843 | Stan Pilecki | 10/06/1970 | Mid-Canterbury |
| 844 | Eric Andrews | 13/06/1970 | Nelson Bays |
| 845 | Paul McNicholl | 12/08/1970 | Australian Combined Services |
| 846 | Peter McBaron | 12/08/1970 | Australian Combined Services |
| 847 | Richard Miller | 12/05/1971 | British Isles |
| 848 | Geoff Richardson | 12/05/1971 | British Isles |
| 849 | David Rathie | 05/06/1971 | South Australia |
| 850 | Ian Ross | 27/06/1971 | New South Wales |
| 851 | Mark Skelton | 18/07/1971 | Californian Golden Bears |
| 852 | Jim Stratford | 18/07/1971 | Californian Golden Bears |
| 853 | Michael Thomas | 18/07/1971 | Californian Golden Bears |
| 854 | Art Galbraith | 24/07/1971 | South Africa |
| 855 | Trevor Carr | 11/08/1971 | Australian Combined Services |
| 856 | Dugald Clark | 11/08/1971 | Australian Combined Services |
| 857 | David Withers | 11/08/1971 | Australian Combined Services |
| 858 | Paddy Batch | 10/05/1972 | New South Wales Country |
| 859 | Chris Handy | 10/05/1972 | New South Wales Country |
| 860 | Greg Holben | 28/05/1972 | New Zealand Maori |
| 861 | C. Hannam | 02/07/1972 | Australian Capital Territory |
| 862 | James Meaney | 02/07/1972 | Australian Capital Territory |
| 863 | Peter Trehearn | 02/07/1972 | Australian Capital Territory |
| 864 | Damien Barker | 09/07/1972 | Victoria |
| 865 | Gary Pearson | 15/07/1972 | New South Wales |
| 866 | David Cruice | 15/07/1972 | New South Wales |
| 867 | Greg Dux | 16/08/1972 | Australian Combined Services |
| 868 | Peter Fleming | 16/08/1972 | Australian Combined Services |
| 869 | G. O'Reilly | 16/08/1972 | Australian Combined Services |
| 870 | Greg Galligan | 16/08/1972 | Australian Combined Services |
| 871 | Craig Smith | 16/08/1972 | Australian Combined Services |
| 872 | Michael Cocks | 10/05/1973 | Sydney |
| 873 | Mark Loane | 10/05/1973 | Sydney |
| 874 | Tony Shaw | 10/05/1973 | Sydney |
| 875 | Paul McLean | 10/05/1973 | Sydney |
| 876 | Jim Wilson | 03/07/1973 | Tonga |
| 877 | Bruce Cooke | 08/05/1974 | New South Wales |
| 878 | Rod Hauser | 08/05/1974 | New South Wales |
| 879 | Jack Martin | 08/05/1974 | New South Wales |
| 880 | Gregory Shambrook | 08/05/1974 | New South Wales |
| 881 | Geoff White | 08/05/1974 | New South Wales |
| 882 | Hud Rickit | 28/05/1974 | New Zealand |
| 883 | Mark Anderson | 15/08/1990 | Bath |
| 884 | David Logan | 08/07/1974 | Victoria |
| 885 | Paul Smith | 08/07/1974 | Victoria |
| 886 | Paul Johnstone | 14/08/1974 | Australian Combined Services |
| 887 | Jeff Weeks | 14/08/1974 | Australian Combined Services |
| 888 | Donald Regeling | 27/05/1975 | England |
| 889 | John Dun | 16/06/1975 | Australian Capital Territory |
| 890 | Duncan Hall Jr. | 16/06/1975 | Australian Capital Territory |
| 891 | David Hillhouse | 16/06/1975 | Australian Capital Territory |
| 892 | Barry Leal | 16/06/1975 | Australian Capital Territory |
| 893 | Graham Noon | 16/06/1975 | Australian Capital Territory |
| 894 | Graham Brand | 20/07/1975 | New South Wales |
| 895 | Kim McCasker | 20/07/1975 | New South Wales |
| 896 | Brian Fleming | 13/08/1975 | Australian Combined Services |
| 897 | Andrew Slack | 13/08/1975 | Australian Combined Services |
| 898 | Greg Moloney | 24/08/1975 | Sydney |
| 899 | Peter McLean | 15/05/1976 | New England |
| 900 | James Miller | 15/05/1976 | New England |
| 901 | Bill Ross | 15/05/1976 | New England |
| 902 | Neville Cottrell, Jr. | 27/07/1976 | South Auckland Northern Sub-Unions |
| 903 | Mick Want | 27/07/1976 | South Auckland Northern Sub-Unions |
| 904 | Terry Batch | 11/08/1976 | Australian Combined Services |
| 905 | Trevor Davies | 20/03/1977 | New Zealand Barbarians |
| 906 | Geoff Shaw | 20/03/1977 | New Zealand Barbarians |
| 907 | Tom Barker | 30/04/1977 | New England |
| 908 | Greg Cornelsen | 30/04/1977 | New England |
| 909 | Peter Horton | 30/04/1977 | New England |
| 910 | Taito Rauluni | 30/04/1977 | New England |
| 911 | Robert Hayes | 09/08/1977 | Australian Combined Services |
| 912 | Brendan Moon | 03/03/1978 | Japan B |
| 913 | Roger Gould | 08/03/1978 | British Columbia |
| 914 | Mark Peacock | 08/03/1978 | British Columbia |
| 915 | Paul Persijn | 08/03/1978 | British Columbia |
| 916 | Stephen Rowley | 25/04/1978 | North Auckland |
| 917 | Peter Grigg | 03/07/1978 | New Zealand Maori |
| 918 | Anthony D'Arcy | 09/07/1978 | New Zealand Maori |
| 919 | Dennis Owens | 29/04/1979 | Sydney |
| 920 | Brian MacNish | 29/05/1979 | Ireland |
| 921 | David Forsyth | 13/04/1980 | King Country |
| 922 | Bill McDonnell | 13/04/1980 | King Country |
| 923 | Bruce Kennon | 04/05/1980 | Taranaki |
| 924 | Sione Mafi | 04/05/1980 | Taranaki |
| 925 | Brian Donnellan | 20/07/1980 | Manawatu |
| 926 | Chris Roche | 20/07/1980 | Manawatu |
| 927 | Jonathon Windsor | 20/07/1980 | Manawatu |
| 928 | Paul Costello Jr. | 23/07/1980 | Thames Valley |
| 929 | Mark McBain | 23/07/1980 | Thames Valley |
| 930 | Andy McIntyre | 23/07/1980 | Thames Valley |
| 931 | Shane Nightingale | 23/07/1980 | Thames Valley |
| 932 | Guy Sanders | 23/07/1980 | Thames Valley |
| 933 | Ross Hanley | 29/03/1981 | Victoria |
| 934 | Danny McIvor | 29/03/1981 | Victoria |
| 935 | Tim Lane | 29/03/1981 | Victoria |
| 936 | Chris Carberry | 12/04/1981 | Sydney |
| 937 | Michael O'Connor | 12/04/1981 | Sydney |
| 938 | Tony Parker | 12/04/1981 | Sydney |
| 939 | Andrew Austin | 02/08/1981 | Italy |
| 940 | Michael Lynagh | 04/04/1982 | Wairarapa-Bush |
| 941 | Greg Burke | 02/05/1982 | Canterbury |
| 942 | Mark Nightingale | 02/05/1982 | Canterbury |
| 943 | Mick Arnold | 05/05/1982 | Hawkes's Bay |
| 944 | Nigel Holt | 05/05/1982 | Hawke's Bay |
| 945 | Jeff Miller | 16/05/1982 | World XV |
| 946 | John Meadows | 13/06/1982 | Scotland |
| 947 | Peter Lavin | 09/04/1983 | Fiji |
| 948 | Brett Scott | 09/04/1983 | Fiji |
| 949 | Michael Crank | 12/04/1983 | Western Province (Fiji) |
| 950 | Paul Johnston | 12/04/1983 | Western Province (Fiji) |
| 951 | Greg Martin | 12/04/1983 | Western Province (Fiji) |
| 952 | Murray Phillips | 12/04/1983 | Western Province (Fiji) |
| 953 | Paul Southwell | 12/04/1983 | Western Province (Fiji) |
| 954 | Danny Tighe | 08/05/1983 | North Auckland |
| 955 | Bill Campbell | 07/04/1984 | Fiji |
| 956 | Michael Cook | 07/04/1984 | Fiji |
| 957 | Tom Lawton | 24/04/1984 | North Auckland |
| 958 | Cameron Lillicrap | 24/04/1984 | North Auckland |
| 959 | John Woodgate | 24/04/1984 | North Auckland |
| 960 | Alan Dick | 27/05/1984 | New South Wales Country & ACT |
| 961 | David Codey | 01/07/1984 | New South Wales |
| 962 | Serafín Dengra | 28/04/1985 | Wellington |
| 963 | Damien Frawley | 28/04/1985 | Wellington |
| 964 | Greg Hassall | 28/04/1985 | Wellington |
| 965 | Stephen Philpotts | 28/04/1985 | Wellington |
| 966 | Brian Smith | 28/04/1985 | Wellington |
| 967 | Neil Goodman-Jones | 01/05/1985 | King Country |
| 968 | Peter Slattery | 01/05/1985 | King Country |
| 969 | Julian Gardner | 19/05/1985 | New Zealand Counties |
| 970 | Nigel Kassulke | 19/05/1985 | New |
| 971 | Paul Mills | 14/07/1985 | North Auckland |
| 972 | Troy Coker | 05/01/1986 | Kent |
| 973 | John Heinke | 05/01/1986 | Kent |
| 974 | Anthony Herbert | 08/01/1986 | Middlesex |
| 975 | Rob Lawton | 08/01/1986 | Middlesex |
| 976 | Rod McCall | 27/04/1986 | Canterbury |
| 977 | Brendan Nasser | 04/05/1986 | Auckland |
| 978 | Tim Dodson | 15/06/1986 | France |
| 979 | Sam Scott-Young | 12/04/1987 | Fiji |
| 980 | Stephen Partridge | 22/04/1987 | North Auckland |
| 981 | David Phillips | 22/04/1987 | North Auckland |
| 982 | Paul Kahl | 03/05/1987 | Canterbury |
| 983 | Dan Crowley | 24/05/1987 | Languedoc |
| 984 | Michael Hayes | 24/05/1987 | Languedoc |
| 985 | Damien Reidy | 24/05/1987 | Languedoc |
| 986 | Stephen Tait | 24/05/1987 | Languedoc |
| 987 | Antony Knox | 04/07/1987 | New South Wales |
| 988 | Paul Carozza | 02/04/1988 | Australian Capital Territory |
| 989 | Doug Cooper | 02/04/1988 | Australian Capital Territory |
| 990 | James McInerney | 02/04/1988 | Australian Capital Territory |
| 991 | Ilaitia Savai | 02/04/1988 | Australian Capital Territory |
| 992 | Richard Tombs | 10/04/1988 | Wellington |
| 993 | Kent Bray | 23/04/1988 | Canterbury |
| 994 | Dean Garnett | 23/04/1988 | Canterbury |
| 995 | David Williams | 30/04/1988 | Fiji |
| 996 | Kents Wills | 30/04/1988 | Fiji |
| 997 | Mitchell Palm | 10/07/1988 | New Zealand |
| 998 | Bruce Davies | 04/03/1989 | Mar del Plata |
| 999 | Andrew King | 04/03/1989 | Mar del Plata |
| 1000 | Rob Korst | 04/03/1989 | Mar del Plata |
| 1001 | David Nucifora | 04/03/1989 | Mar del Plata |
| 1002 | Fraser Perrin | 04/03/1989 | Mar del Plata |
| 1003 | Jason Little | 08/03/1989 | Cuyo |
| 1004 | David Wilson | 08/03/1989 | Cuyo |
| 1005 | Dominic Maguire | 09/04/1989 | Canterbury |
| 1006 | Isei Siganiyavi | 09/04/1989 | Canterbury |
| 1007 | Tim Horan | 17/03/1990 | Fiji |
| 1008 | Richard Moroney | 17/03/1990 | Fiji |
| 1009 | Matthew Ryan | 17/03/1990 | Fiji |
| 1010 | Mark Catchpole | 31/03/1990 | Western Samoa |
| 1011 | Garrick Morgan | 31/03/1990 | Western Samoa |
| 1012 | John Eales | 06/05/1990 | Canterbury |
| 1013 | Morgens Anderson | 01/06/1974 | Sydney |
| 1014 | Keith Blaikie | 15/08/1990 | Bath |
| 1015 | Scott Harris | 15/08/1990 | Bath |
| 1016 | Matthew Hood | 15/08/1990 | Bath |
| 1017 | Richard Kinsey | 15/08/1990 | Bath |
| 1018 | Rob McCartney | 15/08/1990 | Bath |
| 1019 | Will Shaw | 15/08/1990 | Bath |
| 1020 | Sean Tweedy | 15/08/1990 | Bath |
| 1021 | Damien Wallis | 15/08/1990 | Bath |
| 1022 | Peni Volavola | 11/12/1990 | North Hampton |
| 1023 | Bradley Free | 19/12/1990 | Fiji |
| 1024 | Ian Williams | 17/03/1991 | North Harbour |
| 1025 | Michael Foley | 07/04/1991 | Saitama |
| 1026 | Graham Holt | 07/04/1991 | Saitama |
| 1027 | Anthony Rees | 14/04/1991 | Canterbury |
| 1028 | Adrian Skeggs | 19/05/1991 | Fiji |
| 1029 | Matt Pini | 22/03/1992 | Canterbury |
| 1030 | Damian Smith | 22/03/1992 | Canterbury |
| 1031 | Brett Johnstone | 11/04/1992 | Fiji |
| 1032 | Ilivasi Tabua | 10/05/1992 | Canterbury |
| 1033 | Damon Emtage | 21/03/1993 | Western Province |
| 1034 | Brett Robinson | 21/03/1993 | Western Province |
| 1035 | Matthew Holt | 07/04/1993 | Fiji |
| 1036 | Glen Panoho | 07/04/1993 | Fiji |
| 1037 | Graham Hislop | 17/04/1993 | Auckland |
| 1038 | Brenton Fielke | 07/04/1993 | Fiji |
| 1039 | Daniel Herbert | 05/05/1993 | Border |
| 1040 | Mark Murray | 05/05/1993 | Border |
| 1041 | Pat Howard | 30/05/1993 | Australian Capital Territory |
| 1042 | Clayton Moors | 08/08/1993 | South Africa |
| 1043 | Keiron Jeffries | 30/05/1993 | Australian Capital Territory |
| 1044 | Glen Brown | 03/03/1994 | Mar del Plata |
| 1045 | Brendan Cannon | 03/03/1994 | Mar del Plata |
| 1046 | Mark Connors | 03/03/1994 | Mar del Plata |
| 1047 | Ryan Constable | 03/03/1994 | Mar del Plata |
| 1048 | Barry Lea | 03/03/1994 | Mar del Plata |
| 1049 | Jason Reilly | 03/03/1994 | Mar del Plata |
| 1050 | Michael Ware | 12/03/1994 | Tucuman |
| 1051 | Craig Howe | 05/04/1994 | Eastern Prov President's XV |
| 1052 | Tyron Mandrusiak | 16/04/1994 | Otago |
| 1053 | Andrew Blades | 03/03/1995 | Canterbury |
| 1054 | Glenn Vassallo | 24/03/1995 | Orange Free State |
| 1055 | Drew Barrett | 08/04/1995 | Transvaal |
| 1056 | Matt Cockbain | 28/05/1995 | England XV |
| 1057 | David Giffin | 28/05/1995 | England XV |
| 1058 | Christian Knapp | 28/05/1995 | England XV |
| 1059 | Luke Oxenham | 28/05/1995 | England XV |
| 1060 | Tom Boston | 28/05/1995 | England XV |
| 1061 | Mark Gabey | 28/05/1995 | England XV |
| 1062 | Toutai Kefu | 31/05/1995 | Natal |
| 1063 | Ben Tune | 20/08/1995 | Otago |

=== Super Rugby AUS players ===
| No. | Name | Caps | Tries | C | P | DG | Points | Debut | Last |
|---|---|---|---|---|---|---|---|---|---|
| 1 | Jock Campbell | 3 | 1 | 3 | | | 11 | 14/09/2025 | 12/09/2026 |
| 2 | Massimo de Lutiis | 2 | | | | | | 14/09/2025 | 20/09/2025 |
| 3 | Theo Fourie | 2 | | | | | | 14/09/2025 | 28/09/2025 |
| 4 | Isaac Henry | 2 | | | | | | 14/09/2025 | 20/09/2025 |
| 5 | Vaiuta Latu | 6 | 3 | | | | 15 | 14/09/2025 | 27/09/2026 |
| 6 | Harry McLaughlin-Phillips | 2 | | 8 | | | 16 | 14/09/2025 | 28/09/2025 |
| 7 | Hamish Muller | 3 | | | | | | 14/09/2025 | 28/09/2025 |
| 8 | Heremaia Murray | 3 | | | | | | 14/09/2025 | 28/09/2025 |
| 9 | Dre Pakeho | 3 | 1 | | | | 5 | 14/09/2025 | 28/09/2025 |
| 10 | Tom Robinson | 6 | 2 | | | | 10 | 14/09/2025 | 27/09/2026 |
| 11 | Aidan Ross | 2 | | | | | | 14/09/2025 | 20/09/2025 |
| 12 | Tim Ryan | 6 | 6 | 1 | | | 32 | 14/09/2025 | 27/09/2026 |
| 13 | Kalani Thomas | 3 | | | | | | 14/09/2025 | 28/09/2025 |
| 14 | Seru Uru | 3 | | | | | | 14/09/2025 | 28/09/2025 |
| 15 | Connor Vest | 2 | | | | | | 14/09/2025 | 20/09/2025 |
| 16 | George Blake | 6 | | | | | | 14/09/2025 | 27/09/2026 |
| 17 | Sef Fa'agase | 3 | | | | | | 14/09/2025 | 28/09/2025 |
| 18 | Charlie Brosnan | 5 | | | | | | 14/09/2025 | 27/09/2026 |
| 19 | James Martens | 3 | 1 | | | | 5 | 14/09/2025 | 28/09/2025 |
| 20 | Xavier Rubens | 2 | 2 | | | | 10 | 14/09/2025 | 28/09/2025 |
| 21 | Zac Hough | 4 | 1 | | | | 5 | 14/09/2025 | 27/09/2026 |
| 22 | Kohan Herbert | 3 | | | | | | 14/09/2025 | 28/09/2025 |
| 23 | Will Cartwright | 3 | 1 | | | | 5 | 14/09/2025 | 28/09/2025 |
| 24 | Lachie Anderson | 2 | 1 | | | | 5 | 20/09/2025 | 12/09/2026 |
| 25 | Joe Brial | 5 | 1 | | | | 5 | 20/09/2025 | 27/09/2026 |
| 26 | Matt Faessler | 5 | 2 | | | | 10 | 20/09/2025 | 27/09/2026 |
| 27 | Jeffrey Toomaga-Allen | 2 | 1 | | | | 5 | 20/09/2025 | 28/09/2025 |
| 28 | Josh Flook | 3 | | | | | | 20/09/2025 | 12/09/2026 |
| 29 | Trevor King | 4 | | | | | | 28/09/2025 | 27/09/2026 |
| 30 | Will McCulloch | 4 | 1 | | | | 5 | 28/09/2025 | 27/09/2026 |
| 31 | Nick Bloomfield | 3 | | | | | | 12/09/2026 | 27/09/2026 |
| 32 | John Bryant | 3 | 1 | | | | 5 | 12/09/2026 | 27/09/2026 |
| 33 | Mosiah Christian | 3 | | | | | | 12/09/2026 | 27/09/2026 |
| 34 | Tom Lynagh | 3 | | 4 | | | 8 | 12/09/2026 | 27/09/2026 |
| 35 | Will Ross | 3 | | | | | | 12/09/2026 | 27/09/2026 |
| 36 | Josh Takai | 3 | 1 | | | | 5 | 12/09/2026 | 27/09/2026 |
| 37 | Jake Pappin | 3 | | | | | | 12/09/2026 | 27/09/2026 |
| 38 | Zane Nonggorr | 1 | | | | | | 12/09/2026 | 12/09/2026 |
| 39 | Ben Volavola | 3 | | 3 | | | 6 | 12/09/2026 | 27/09/2026 |
| 40 | Cooper Stewart | 2 | | | | | | 12/09/2026 | 19/09/2026 |
| 41 | Harrison Usher | 3 | | | | | | 12/09/2026 | 27/09/2026 |
| 42 | Kenny Harris | 2 | | | | | | 12/09/2026 | 19/09/2026 |
| 43 | David Fusitu'a | 2 | | | | | | 19/09/2026 | 27/09/2026 |
| 44 | Sefa Naivalu | 2 | | | | | | 19/09/2026 | 27/09/2026 |
| 45 | Dom Thygesen | 2 | | | | | | 19/09/2026 | 27/09/2026 |
| 46 | Alex Flanagan Smith | 2 | 1 | | | | 5 | 19/09/2026 | 27/09/2026 |
| 47 | Flynn McDermott | 1 | | 1 | | | 2 | 27/09/2026 | 27/09/2026 |
| 48 | Jake Kurbatoff | 1 | | | | | | 27/09/2026 | 27/09/2026 |
