= Alistar =

Alistar is a given name and surname. Notable people with the name include:

- Alistar Boyd, former Australian rugby union player
- Alistar Fredericks, former South African field hockey player
- Alistar Jordan (born 1949), former New Zealand cricketer
- Elena Alistar, former politician

== See also ==
- Alistair, a male given name
