= Colin Forbes =

Colin Forbes may refer to:

- Colin Forbes (graphic designer) (1928–2022), British graphic designer
- Colin Forbes (ice hockey) (born 1976), Canadian former ice hockey forward
- Colin Forbes (rugby union) (born 1932), rugby union player who represented Australia
- Colin Forbes, pseudonym for Raymond Harold Sawkins (1923–2006), British novelist
