= Brickey =

Brickey is a surname. Notable people with the surname include:

- Frank Brickey (1912–1994), American football and basketball coach
- Robert Brickey (born 1967), American basketball coach
- Brickey Farmer (1885–1969), Australian rugby union player
