= Gavin Warren (rugby union) =

- Born: 14 May 1987 (age 39)
- School: Padua College; Nudgee College

Rugby union career
- Position: Prop
Super Rugby
| Years | Team | Apps | (Points) |
| 2007 | Reds | 1 | (0) |

Gavin Warren (born 14 May 1987) is an Australian former professional rugby union player.

A Queensland native, Warren finished his schooling at Brisbane's Nudgee College and was an Australian Schoolboys representative, undertaking a tour of the British Isles with the team in 2005.

Warren, a prop, was a Queensland Academy player and gained an emergency call up to the Reds Super 14 side to replace an injured Ben Coutts on the bench against the Lions at Lang Park in 2007, having earlier featured in the curtain-raiser. He came on in the 70th minute to make his Reds debut, only to be injured during his first scrum 50 seconds later and get stretchered off in a neck brace, but scans later cleared him of any serious injury.

== See also ==
- List of Queensland Reds players
