= Jack Kennedy (rugby union) =

- Born: 28 January 1987 (age 39) Canberra, ACT, Australia
- Height: 184 cm (6 ft 0 in)
- Weight: 110 kg (243 lb)
- School: St Edmund's College

Rugby union career
- Position: Prop
Super Rugby
Years	Team	Apps	(Points)
2009–10	Reds	8	(0)

Jack Kennedy (born 28 January 1987) is an Australian former professional rugby union player.

Kennedy was raised on a Williamsdale sheep farm, just outside the ACT border. He attended St Edmund's College.

A prop, Kennedy represented Australia at under-age level and competed for the Canberra Vikings in the 2007 Australian Rugby Championship. He also featured for the Brumby Runners, before linking up with the Queensland Reds prior to their 2009 campaign. In two seasons at the Reds, Kennedy was used mostly off the bench and made eight appearances, with his only start coming as a replacement for tight-head Laurie Weeks against the Brumbies in 2010.

== See also ==
- List of Queensland Reds players
