= Nigel Kassulke =

Australian rugby union player (born 1961)

- Full name: Nigel Thomas Kassulke
- Born: 2 August 1961 (age 65) Beaudesert, Queensland

Rugby union career
- Position: Outside centre
International career
Years	Team	Apps	(Points)
1985	Australia	2	(4)

Nigel Thomas Kassulke (born 2 August 1961) is an Australian former rugby union international.

Kassulke was born in Beaudesert, Queensland and boarded at Marist College Ashgrove, where he receiving coaching from former Wallaby Barry Honan. He played in the school's 1978 1st XV premiership team.

An outside centre, Kassulke gained Australian Under-21s representative honours in 1982 and was capped twice for the Wallabies, both home Tests against Canada in 1985. He scored a try on Test debut in Sydney. A knee injury suffered in the second Test at Ballymore kept him on the sidelines for over a year and cruelled his international hopes.

== See also ==
- List of Australia national rugby union players
