= Len Forbes =

- Full name: Leonard Joseph Forbes
- Born: 19 June 1934 Brisbane, QLD, Australia
- Died: 4 September 2003 (aged 69)

Rugby union career
- Position: Front-row
Provincial / State sides
Years	Team	Apps	(Points)
1955–60	Queensland	16	
International career
Years	Team	Apps	(Points)
1958	Australia		

Leonard Joseph Forbes (19 June 1934 – 4 September 2003) was an Australian international rugby union player.

Born in Brisbane, Forbes was the younger brother of Wallabies prop Colin and undertook some of his schooling at St Joseph's College, Gregory Terrace, which he left at the age of 14.

Forbes, a Brothers front-rower, packed a scrum with his brother in his early Queensland appearances and won a Wallabies call up for the 1958 tour of New Zealand, a surprise selection ahead of former captain Bob Davidson. He made four uncapped appearances in New Zealand and was a reserve for the Test matches.

== See also ==
- List of Australia national rugby union players
