= Ant Sauer =

- Full name: Anthony Sauer
- Born: 18 September 1980 (age 46)
- Height: 185 cm (6 ft 1 in)
- Weight: 85 kg (187 lb)
- School: St Columban's College

Rugby union career
- Position: Wing
Super Rugby
Years	Team	Apps	(Points)
2009	Reds	2	(0)
National sevens team
Years	Team		Comps
- Australia

Anthony Sauer (born 18 September 1980) is an Australian former professional rugby union player.

A St Columban's College product, Sauer played at club level for Brisbane club Brothers and was primarily a winger.

Sauer represented Australia as a rugby sevens player, debuting in the 2004–05 World Sevens Series.

Sauer first appeared for the Queensland Reds in a 2005 match against New Zealand "A" at Ballymore Stadium. He featured twice off the bench for the Reds during the 2009 Super 14 season, against the Crusaders at Jade Stadium and then in a home fixture against the Hurricanes.

== See also ==
- List of Queensland Reds players
