= Brett Johnstone =

- Full name: Brett Andrew Johnstone
- Born: 22 April 1970 (age 56) Inglewood, Queensland, Australia

Rugby union career
- Position: Halfback
Super Rugby
Years	Team	Apps	(Points)
1996–99	Queensland Reds		
International career
Years	Team	Apps	(Points)
1993	Australia	1	(5)

Brett Andrew Johnstone (born 22 April 1970) is an Australian former rugby union international.

Johnstone was born in Inglewood, Queensland and attended Downlands College, where he played under the tutelage of ex-England national coach John Elders. One of Johnstone's 1st XV teammates at Downlands was Tim Horan.

A halfback, Johnstone was drafted into the national side in 1993 as an understudy to Peter Slattery. He got his opportunity in that year's Test against Tonga in Brisbane, when he was substituted on for an injured Slattery and scored a debut try for the Wallabies. For the end of year overseas tour, he was overlooked in favour of Mark Catchpole as the reserve scrum-half and didn't earn any further caps.

Johnstone was capped 71 times for the Queensland Reds during the 1990s. In 1995, he had an important role in the side's Super 10 title, scoring a 70-metre intercept try in the second half of the final against Transvaal. He also played some rugby union in South Africa for the Lions in the Currie Cup.

== See also ==
- List of Australia national rugby union players
