= Matt Faessler =

Australian rugby union player

- Full name: Matthew Faessler
- Born: 21 December 1998 (age 27) Australia
- Height: 183 cm (6 ft 0 in)
- Weight: 105 kg (231 lb; 16 st 7 lb)
- School: Toowoomba Grammar

Rugby union career
- Position: Hooker
- Current team: Reds
Senior career
| Years | Team | Apps | (Points) |
| 2019 | Queensland Country | 6 | (0) |
| 2021– | Reds | 60 | (100) |
- Correct as of 6 June 2026
International career
| Years | Team | Apps | (Points) |
| 2018 | Australia U20 | 1 | (0) |
| 2023- | Australia | 5 | (0) |
- Correct as of 24 September 2023

Matt Faessler (born 21 December 1998 in Australia) is an Australian rugby union player who plays internationally for the Wallabies and for the Reds in Super Rugby. His playing position is hooker. He was named in the Reds squad for the 2021 Super Rugby AU season. He previously represented the Queensland Country in the 2019 National Rugby Championship.

Faessler's grandfather Vince Bermingham played for the Wallabies in the 1930s.
