= Chappie Schulte =

Australian rugby union player

- Full name: Burnett George Schulte
- Born: 29 November 1917 Bundaberg, QLD, Australia
- Died: 25 November 1954 (aged 36) Cannon Hill, QLD, Australia

Rugby union career
- Position: Scrum-half
International career
Years	Team	Apps	(Points)
1946	Australia	2	(0)

Burnett George Schulte (29 November 1917 – 25 November 1954), known as Chappie Schulte, was an Australian rugby union international who was capped twice for the Wallabies in 1946.

Schulte was born in Bundaberg and attended Brisbane State High School.

A halfback, Schulte played in the late 1930s for Eagle Junction, the dominant team in Brisbane rugby. He represented Queensland in seven matches during this period, before his career was stalled by World War II. Posted to Singapore, Schulte ended up as a prisoner of war at Changi Prison, where he survived for three years until being freed in 1945.

Schulte was called up by the Wallabies for the 1946 tour of New Zealand, where he gained two Test caps, against the All Blacks in Dunedin and NZ Maori in Hamilton. He also captained the Wallabies in two uncapped tour matches.

An auctioneer by profession, Schulte died at the age of 36 in Brisbane in 1954.

== See also ==
- List of Australia national rugby union players
