= Herman Hunt =

- Born: Herman Hunt; 10 May 1983 (age 43) Auckland, New Zealand
- Height: 183 cm (6 ft 0 in)
- Weight: 123 kg (19 st 5 lb)
- School: St. Joseph's Nudgee College

Rugby union career
- Position: Prop
- Current team: Queensland Reds
Youth career
- Pine Rivers
Provincial / State sides
Years	Team	Apps	(Points)
- University
Super Rugby
Years	Team	Apps	(Points)
2007-	Queensland Reds	10	(0)

Herman Hunt born 10 May 1983 in Auckland, New Zealand is a rugby union player for the Queensland Reds in the Super Rugby competition. Hunt's position of choice is as a prop.
