= Murray Phillips =

Australian sports historian

Murray Phillips is a Professor in the School of Human Movement and Nutrition Sciences at the University of Queensland. His research interests lie in sport and its history, examining its ontological, epistemological and methodological aspects. In conjunction with "Paralympic Stories", Phillips is writing a book on the history of Australia's Paralympic movement.

== Selected publications ==
- Phillips, M., 1997. An illusory image: A report on the media coverage and portrayal of women's sport in Australia. Australian Sports Commission.
- Phillips, M.G., 2001. Deconstructing sport history: The postmodern challenge. Journal of Sport History, 28(3), pp. 327–343.
- Phillips, M.G., 2016. Wikipedia and history: a worthwhile partnership in the digital era?. Rethinking History, 20(4), pp. 523–543.
