= Charlie Brosnan =

Australian rugby union player

- Born: 27 January 2005 (age 21) Australia
- Height: 197 cm (6 ft 6 in)
- Weight: 106 kg (234 lb; 16 st 10 lb)
- School: Anglican Church Grammar School

Rugby union career
- Position: Lock / Flanker
- Current team: Reds
Senior career
Years	Team	Apps	(Points)
2026–	Reds	1	(0)
- Correct as of 16 May 2026
International career
Years	Team	Apps	(Points)
2025	Australia U20	6	(0)
- Correct as of 16 May 2026

Charlie Brosnan (born 27 January 2005) is an Australian rugby union player, who plays for the Reds in the Super Rugby. His preferred position is lock or flanker.

== Early career ==
Brosnan was born in Australia and attended Anglican Church Grammar School. He earned selection for Australia Schools in 2023, while also joining up with the Reds academy, representing their U19 side in 2024. In 2025, he was named in the Australia U20 squad. He plays his club rugby for Brothers.

== Professional career ==
Brosnan was first named in the Reds squad for the 2025 Super Rugby AUS competition, He had previously debuted against Tonga in August 2025. He was then named in the Reds squad for the 2026 Super Rugby Pacific season. He made his debut for the Reds in Round 14 of the season against the Force.
