= Lloyd Graham =

Australian rugby union player

Lloyd James Graham (born 29 May 1949, in Mackay, Queensland) is a former Queensland Rugby Union player.

Born the son of a cane farmer, Jim Graham, Graham represented Queensland in Rugby, playing 30 matches for the state, including wins over New South Wales in 1970, Scotland in 1970, and the British Lions in 1971.

After his days as an athlete Graham ran a successful advertising agency for many years in Brisbane, and was Qld. Chairman of the Advertising Federation of Australia from 1988 to 1990. A Life Member of the Queensland Rugby Club and the GPS Old Boys Rugby Club, he has now retired from the marketing consultancy company Media Works.
