= Fred Whyatt =

- Full name: Frederick Joseph Whyatt
- Born: 25 March 1910 Sydney, Australia
- Died: 9 March 1968 (aged 57)

Rugby union career
- Position: Lock / No. 8
Provincial / State sides
Years	Team	Apps	(Points)
- Queensland
International career
Years	Team	Apps	(Points)
1931	Australia		

Frederick Joseph Whyatt (25 March 1910 – 9 March 1968) was an Australian international rugby union player.

Born in Sydney, Whyatt was educated at Brisbane State High School and the University of Queensland.

Whyatt excelled in rowing during his high school years and was later a member of the same varsity rowing eight as future Wallaby Jimmy Clark, with whom he competed at a national inter–varsity tournament held in Sydney.

As a rugby player, Whyatt was considered a line–out specialist, best suited to the second row, but also capable of playing as a number eight. He was a member of the Queensland team which faced the 1930 British Lions and the following year was picked from his university's XV to tour New Zealand with the Wallabies. His opportunities were limited, with Bruce Judd and Max White favoured for the second row positions, restricting him to three uncapped matches.

== See also ==
- List of Australia national rugby union players
