= Alistar Jordan =

New Zealand cricketer (1949–2025)

Personal information
- Full name: Alistar Bruce Jordan
- Born: 5 September 1949; Inglewood, Taranaki, New Zealand
- Died: 23 November 2025 (aged 76); Taranaki, New Zealand
- Batting: Left-handed
- Bowling: Right-arm fast-medium

Domestic team information
- Years: Team
- 1968/69–1979/80: Central Districts
- 1980: Cambridgeshire

Career statistics
Competition	First-class	List A
Matches	58	12
Runs scored	560	32
Batting average	10.98	6.40
100s/50s	0/0	0/0
Top score	47	10
Balls bowled	9,905	611
Wickets	165	17
Bowling average	28.38	42.00
5 wickets in innings	7	0
10 wickets in match	0	0
Best bowling	7/82	3/20
Catches/stumpings	28/–	1/–
- Source: Cricinfo, 30 August 2017

Alistar Bruce Jordan (5 September 1949 – 23 November 2025) was a New Zealand cricketer who played first-class cricket for Central Districts from 1969 to 1980.

== Biography ==
A right-arm opening bowler, Jordan's best figures in first-class cricket were 7 for 82 against Otago in 1972–73. He was a member of the New Zealand team that briefly toured Australia in 1972–73.

Jordan also played Hawke Cup cricket for Taranaki from 1966 to 1992, and was named in the Hawke Cup Team of the Century in 2011. He was a player, coach and administrator in Taranaki for more than 50 years. In 2010, he was awarded life membership of the Taranaki Cricket Association. He was inducted into the Taranaki Sports Hall of Fame in 2012 and became a life member of the Central Districts Cricket Association in 2023.

Jordan and his wife Diane were married for 55 years until his death at his home, on 23 November 2025, at the age of 76.
