= Vince Bermingham =

Rugby player (1907–1983)

- Full name: John Vincent Bermingham
- Born: 24 May 1907 Greenmount, QLD, Australia
- Died: 22 July 1983 (aged 76) Brisbane, QLD, Australia
- School: Warwick Technical College
- Occupation: Farmer

Rugby union career
- Position: Prop
International career
Years	Team	Apps	(Points)
1934–37	Australia	3	(0)

John Vincent Bermingham (24 May 1907 — 22 July 1983) was an Australian rugby union international.

A native of Greenmount, Queensland, Bermingham received his education at Warwick Technical College.

Bermingham was a powerfully built prop, who was a state amateur heavyweight boxing champion. Capped three times for the Wallabies, he played both Tests in a Bledisloe Cup-winning series against the All Blacks in 1934, then a match against the touring 1937 Springboks. He also played rugby league for Toowoomba club Valleys.

Bermingham was awarded the Queen Elizabeth II Silver Jubilee Medal in 1977 for service to the dairy industry.

Wallabies hooker Matt Faessler is his grandson.

== See also ==
- List of Australia national rugby union players
