= Allan Ware =

- Full name: Allan Henry Ware
- Born: 30 December 1925 Ipswich, QLD, Australia
- Died: 8 September 1996 (aged 70)
- Height: 170 cm (5 ft 7 in)
- Weight: 70 kg (154 lb)
- School: Ipswich Grammar School

Rugby union career
- Position: Three-quarter
Provincial / State sides
| Years | Team | Apps | (Points) |
- Queensland
International career
| Years | Team | Apps | (Points) |
| 1949 | Australia | | |

Allan Henry Ware (30 December 1925 – 8 September 1996) was an Australian international rugby union player.

Born in Ipswich, Ware completed his secondary education at Ipswich Grammar School during the early stages of World War II and showed promise as a cricketer, earning selection to the GPS XI his final year.

Ware played his rugby as a three-quarter with Brisbane club GPS, where he was known for his pace and swerving runs. He made his Queensland interstate debut in 1945 at the age of 19. In 1947, Ware was on the wing for Queensland in a match against the touring All Blacks. His career peaked in 1949 when he ascended to the captaincy of GPS and made the Wallabies squad for the tour of New Zealand. He scored tries in wins over King Country and Poverty Bay-East Coast, but was only a reserve for the matches against the All Blacks.

A school teacher by profession, Ware was a sports master at Ipswich Grammar School, with future Wallaby Ken Donald one of his pupils. He later taught at The Southport School on the Gold Coast.

== See also ==
- List of Australia national rugby union players
