= Lew Evans (rugby union) =

Australian rugby union player

- Born: Llewellyn John Evans; 19 February 1881 Brisbane, Queensland
- Notable relative: Poley Evans

Rugby union career
- Position: fly-half
International career
Years	Team	Apps	(Points)
1903–04	Australia	3	(0)

Llewellyn John Evans (born 19 February 1881) was a rugby union player who represented Australia.

Evans, a fly-half, was born in Brisbane, Queensland, and won three international rugby caps for Australia, his first against New Zealand, at Sydney, on 15 August 1903.

His brother, Poley Evans, also represented Australia in the inaugural Test match of 1899.
