= Kevin Hodda =

Australian rugby player (1923–2009)

- Full name: Kevin Joseph Hodda
- Born: 25 June 1923 Brisbane, QLD, Australia
- Died: 15 March 2009 (aged 85)

Rugby union career
- Position: Hooker
Provincial / State sides
Years	Team	Apps	(Points)
- Queensland
International career
Years	Team	Apps	(Points)
1946	Australia		

Kevin Joseph Hodda (25 June 1923 – 15 March 2009) was an Australian international rugby union player.

Born in Brisbane, Hodda attended St Columban's College and had his final year at St Joseph's College, Gregory Terrace, in order to get experience playing GPS rugby. He was an accountant by profession.

Hodda, a hooker, made his debut for Brothers in 1941. He became Queensland hooker in 1945 and outperformed his New South Wales opponent Don Furness, putting himself in contention to replace the retired Eddie Bonis in the Wallabies side. After a strong performance in the trials, Hodda won selection for the 1946 tour of New Zealand as first choice hooker, but suffered a tour ending knee injury in the opening fixture against North Auckland. He retired in 1949.

== See also ==
- List of Australia national rugby union players
