= Bob Honan =

Australia dual-code rugby international footballer

- Born: Robert Emmett Honan; 24 January 1944 (age 82) Brisbane, Queensland
- Notable relative: Barry Honan (brother)

Rugby union career
- Position: Centre
Amateur team(s)
Years	Team	Apps	(Points)
1964-1966	Brothers		
International career
Years	Team	Apps	(Points)
1964	Australia	2	
- Rugby league career

Playing information
- Position: Halfback, Centre
Club
Years	Team	Pld	T	G	FG	P
1967–75	South Sydney Rabbitohs	84	27	0	6	93
Representative
Years	Team	Pld	T	G	FG	P
1969	New South Wales	3	0	0	0	0
1969	Australia	2	0	0	0	0

Robert Emmett Honan (born 24 January 1944) is an Australian former rugby union and rugby league footballer who played in the 1960s and 1970s – a dual code rugby international.

== Background ==
Honan was born in Brisbane, Queensland, Australia.

== Rugby career ==
He represented the Wallabies in two Tests on the 1964 tour of New Zealand and played in the centres. His brother Barry was also a Wallaby representative.

== Rugby league career ==
After switching codes he was selected to the Australia national rugby league team on the 1969 tour of New Zealand playing two Tests as a winger. His rugby league international debut in the first Test in Auckland in June 1969 saw him become Australia's 31st dual code rugby international, following Kevin Ryan and preceding Phil Hawthorne and John Brass.

Bob Honan's rugby league club career was as a centre with the South Sydney Rabbitohs from 1967 to 1972 and 1975. He played in the premiership winning Souths sides of 1968 and 1970 and in the 1969 Grand Final loss to Balmain.

== Playing record ==
- Club: South Sydney Rabbitohs 84 first grade games (105 all grades), 27 tries (35 all grades), 6 field goals (9 all grades), 93 points (123 all grades).
- Representative: Australia (1969) 2 Tests.
