= Donald Regeling =

Australian cricketer (born 1955)

Personal information
- Born: 13 August 1955 (age 71); Boonah, Queensland, Australia
- Source: Cricinfo, 6 October 2020

Donald Regeling (born 13 August 1955) is an Australian cricketer. He played in four first-class matches for Queensland in 1978/79. He is known for being a right-handed batsman.

== Early life ==
Regeling was born in Boonah, Queensland, Australia and attended Brisbane State High School.

== See also ==
- List of Queensland first-class cricketers
