= William Evans (Australian sportsman) =

Australian rugby union player and cricket player

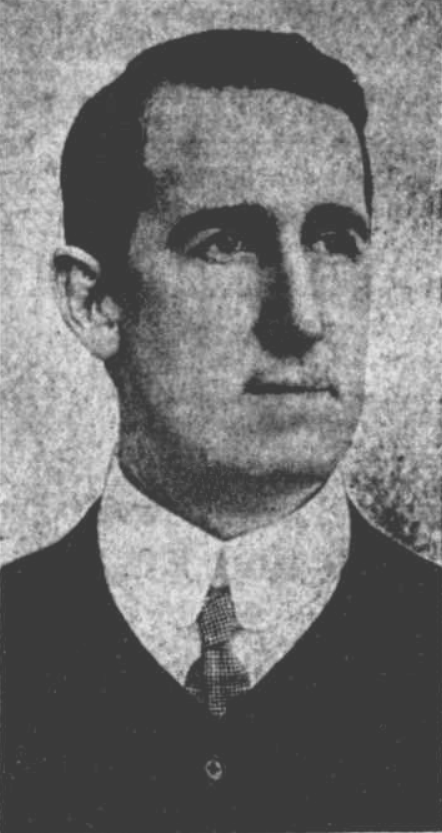

Personal information
- Full name: William Thomas Evans
- Born: 9 April 1876; Indooroopilly, Queensland, Australia
- Died: 19 July 1964 (aged 88); Buranda, Queensland, Australia
- Nickname: Poley
- Batting: Right-handed
- Bowling: Right-arm bowler
- Role: Wicket-keeper

Domestic team information
- Years: Team
- 1898/99–1913/14: Queensland

Career statistics
Competition	First-class
Matches	30
Runs scored	1,132
Batting average	22.64
100s/50s	1/6
Top score	103*
Balls bowled	193
Wickets	8
Bowling average	15.25
5 wickets in innings	1
10 wickets in match	0
Best bowling	7/70
Catches/stumpings	24/16
- Source: CricketArchive, 8 October 2022
- Notable relative: Lew Evans

Rugby union career
Provincial / State sides
Years	Team	Apps	(Points)
- Queensland
International career
Years	Team	Apps	(Points)
1899	Australia	2	(3)

William Thomas "Poley" Evans (9 April 1876 – 19 July 1964) was an Australian sportsman. He captained Queensland at first-class cricket and represented Australia in rugby union. He was born in Indooroopilly, Queensland and died at Buranda, Queensland.

== Rugby union career ==
Evans, who played on the wing, won two caps for Australia at rugby in 1899 as a winger in the national side. His debut game was against Matthew Mullineux's first British Lions to tour Australia at the Sydney Cricket Ground on 24 June 1899, the inaugural rugby Test match played by an Australian national representative side. He scored a try in that match and is listed on rugby records by the name 'Poley' Evans. Four weeks later he played in the second Test in Brisbane. His performance in that match was noted as excellent by the press. He made a state appearance for Queensland that year against those same tourists. Poley's younger brother Lew Evans also represented for Australia from 1903 to 1904.

== Cricket career ==
Evans, who often batted with the tail, made just one first-class century. It came against New South Wales at the Brisbane Cricket Ground in 1908, when he came in at number nine in the batting order and scored 103 not out. When he returned to cricket in 1902 it was as a wicket-keeper and he kept wicket for all but one of his first-class matches from that point.

Queensland didn't play in the Sheffield Shield during Evans's career so most of his appearances were in Brisbane, when they took on touring states. He regularly captained Queensland and even had the honour of captaining an Australian XI for a first-class match against South Africa in 1910.

When Evans made his first-class debut in 1899, it was as an all-rounder. Bowling right arm overarm, he took 7/70, despite his opponents the South Australians amassing 582 runs. It was the first ever time the two states had met at first-class level and thus Evans has the distinction of being the first Queenslander to take a five wicket haul against South Australia.

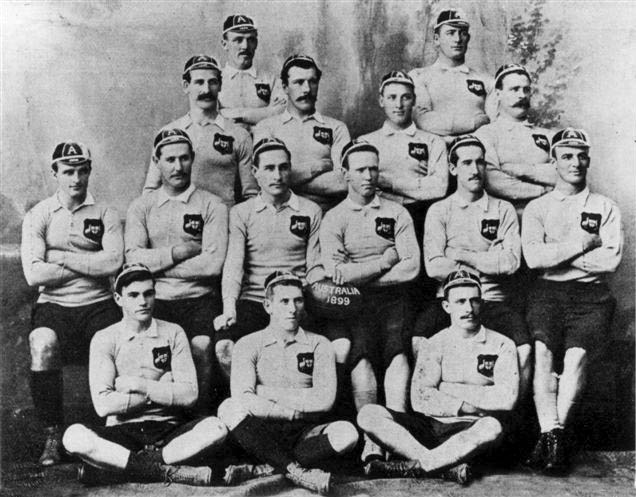
Evans middle row 2nd from right in the inaugural Australian rugby union team, 1899

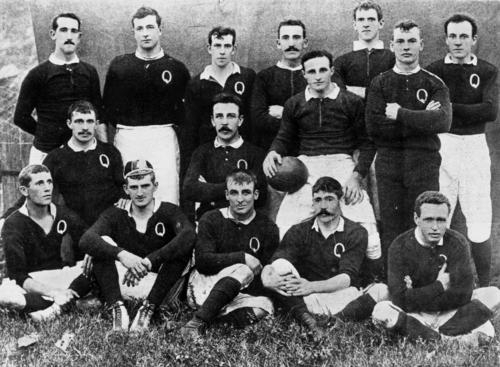
Evans shown back row far left after the 1 July Queensland match against the 1899 British Lions

== Published references ==
- Collection (1995) Gordon Bray presents The Spirit of Rugby, HarperCollins Publishers Sydney
- Howell, Max (2005) Born to Lead - Wallaby Test Captains, Celebrity Books, Auckland NZ
