= Mark Catchpole =

Australian rugby union player (born 1968)

- Full name: Mark Phillip Catchpole
- Born: 9 January 1968 (age 58) Sydney, NSW, Australia
- Height: 5 ft 9 in (175 cm)
- Weight: 187 lb (85 kg)
- School: The Southport School
- Notable relative: Ken Catchpole (father)

Rugby union career
- Position: Scrum-half
Provincial / State sides
| Years | Team | Apps | (Points) |
- Queensland
| - | New South Wales | | |
International career
| Years | Team | Apps | (Points) |
| 1993 | Australia | | |

Mark Phillip Catchpole (born 9 January 1968) is an Australian former international rugby union player.

Catchpole, son of Wallabies captain Ken Catchpole, spent his early years in Sydney and was a Lindfield junior. He later attended The Southport School in Queensland, where he had two years in the 1st XV, then played senior rugby for the Gold Coast RUFC. After moving to Brisbane club Western Districts, Catchpole won the 1992 Rothmans Medal.

A scrum-half like his father, Catchpole received limited representative honours for Queensland, with Peter Slattery establishing himself in that position. He did however gain a Wallabies call up in 1993, for a tour of North America and France, preferred over Brett Johnstone as the understudy to Slattery. Debuting against Canada "B" in Calgary, Catchpole was subsequently restricted to the bench for the Test fixtures and finished with five uncapped appearances.

Catchpole had a strong debut season with the Warringah Rats in 1994, winning the Shute Shield's best fairest player award, which is now named after his father. His year also included captaincy of an Australian XV against Ireland, a representative debut for New South Wales and tour of South Africa with the Emerging Wallabies.

In 1997, Catchpole was a member of the Western Province side that won South Africa's Currie Cup competition.

Catchpole won his second Shute Shield best and fairest in 1998, playing for Sydney University.

In 2009, Catchpole received a five-month minimum prison sentence for drug and gun offenses, stemming from a raid on his property the previous year in connection to the case involving Olympic swimmer Scott Miller. He pleaded guilty to firearm possession charges and two counts of possessing a prohibited drug.

== See also ==
- List of Australia national rugby union players
