= Barry Honan =

Australian rugby union international

- Full name: Barry David Honan
- Born: 4 June 1947 (age 79) Brisbane, Australia
- Notable relative: Bob Honan (brother)

Rugby union career
- Position: Utility back
International career
Years	Team	Apps	(Points)
1968–69	Australia	9	(0)

Barry David Honan (born 4 June 1947) is an Australian former rugby union international.

Born in Brisbane, Honan attended Marist College Ashgrove and is the younger brother of Wallaby Bob Honan.

Honan, a utility back, made his Queensland representative debut at age 18. He was first capped by the Wallabies as a centre on New Zealand's 1968 tour, debuting in Sydney. In the 2nd Test at Ballymore, Honan conceded a contentious penalty try with two minutes remaining for a late tackle on Bill Davis, with the subsequent conversion giving the All Blacks the win. He was used as a fullback on the 1968 tour of British Isles and a centre for all four Tests on the 1969 tour of South Africa. A teacher by profession, Honan was a 1st XV coach at Marist College Ashgrove.

== See also ==
- List of Australia national rugby union players
