= Ben Coutts =

Australian rugby union footballer

- Born: Ben Coutts; 15 August 1979 (age 47) Canberra, Australia
- Height: 190 cm (6 ft 3 in)
- Weight: 124 kg (19 st 7 lb)

Rugby union career
- Position: Prop
- Current team: Queensland Reds
Youth career
- Brumbies
Senior career
Years	Team	Apps	(Points)
2004 - 05	Ebbw Vale RFC		
2005 - 06	Sale Sharks	18	(0)
Provincial / State sides
Years	Team	Apps	(Points)
- Canberra Vikings
2006	Southland		
2006 -	Souths	7	(0)
Super Rugby
Years	Team	Apps	(Points)
- Brumbies
2007 -	Queensland Reds	3	(0)

Ben Coutts (born 15 August 1979) is an Australian rugby union footballer, currently signed with Australian franchise, the Queensland Reds, who play in the international Super Rugby tournament.

== Career ==
Prior to moving to the Reds, Coutts played for Welsh Premiership club Ebbw Vale RFC for half a season in 2005. He was then spotted by former Ebbw Vale player Kingsley Jones who is currently the forwards coach at English club Sale Sharks. Coutts was born in Canberra, and he became a product of the Brumbies Rugby development program, and was in the system when Eddie Jones was at the Brumbies. He represented the ACT and under-19 and under-21 level.

Coutts made the move to the English premiership, signing with the Sale Sharks. He made his debut against Worcester in 2005. He since became a regular in the starting lineup for the Sharks. In the 2005–2006 season, Coutts made 13 appearances as Sale Sharks won their first ever Premiership title.

He was closely monitored by 2007 Reds coach Jones, and was offered a two-year contract to return to Australia and play Super 14, he accepted. Coutts' contract with Sale ended in May 2006. He played for Southland in the 2006 Air New Zealand Cup, before officially joining the Reds squad for the newly created Australian Provincial Championship. In November 2006 he played in the Australian Prime Minister's XV Rugby team coached by Bob Dwyer against the Japan national rugby union team, winning 61–19.
