= Brickey Farmer =

Edward Farmer
- Born: Edward Herbert Farmer; 1885 Holborn
- Died: 5 April 1969 Wollongong, New South Wales

Rugby union career
- Position: flanker
International career
Years	Team	Apps	(Points)
1910	Wallabies	1	(0)

Edward Herbert "Brickey" Farmer (1885 – 5 April 1969) was a rugby union player who represented Australia.

Farmer, a flanker, was born in Holborn and claimed one international rugby cap for Australia.
