= Alister Boyd =

- Born: Alister Forrest McClelland Boyd; 27 July 1935 Southport, Queensland
- Died: 28 August 2010 (aged 75)

Rugby union career
- Position: wing
International career
Years	Team	Apps	(Points)
1958	Wallabies	1	(0)

Alister Forrest McClelland Boyd (27 July 1935 – 28 August 2010) was a rugby union player who represented Australia.

Boyd, a wing, was born in Southport, Queensland and claimed 1 international rugby cap for Australia.
