= Colin Forbes (rugby union) =

Australian rugby union player (1932–2021)

- Born: Colin Francis Forbes; 16 August 1932 Brisbane, Queensland
- Died: 25 July 2021

Rugby union career
- Position: prop
International career
Years	Team	Apps	(Points)
1953–56	Wallabies	6	(0)

Colin Francis Forbes (16 August 1932 – 25 July 2021) was a rugby union player who represented Australia.

Forbes, a prop, was born in Brisbane, Queensland and claimed a total of 6 international rugby caps for Australia. His death was announced in July 2021.
