= 2025 Queensland Reds season =

Queensland Reds
2024–25 (Note: The fixtures played beyond July 2024, outside of the Super Rugby, are 2025 pre-season matches.) season
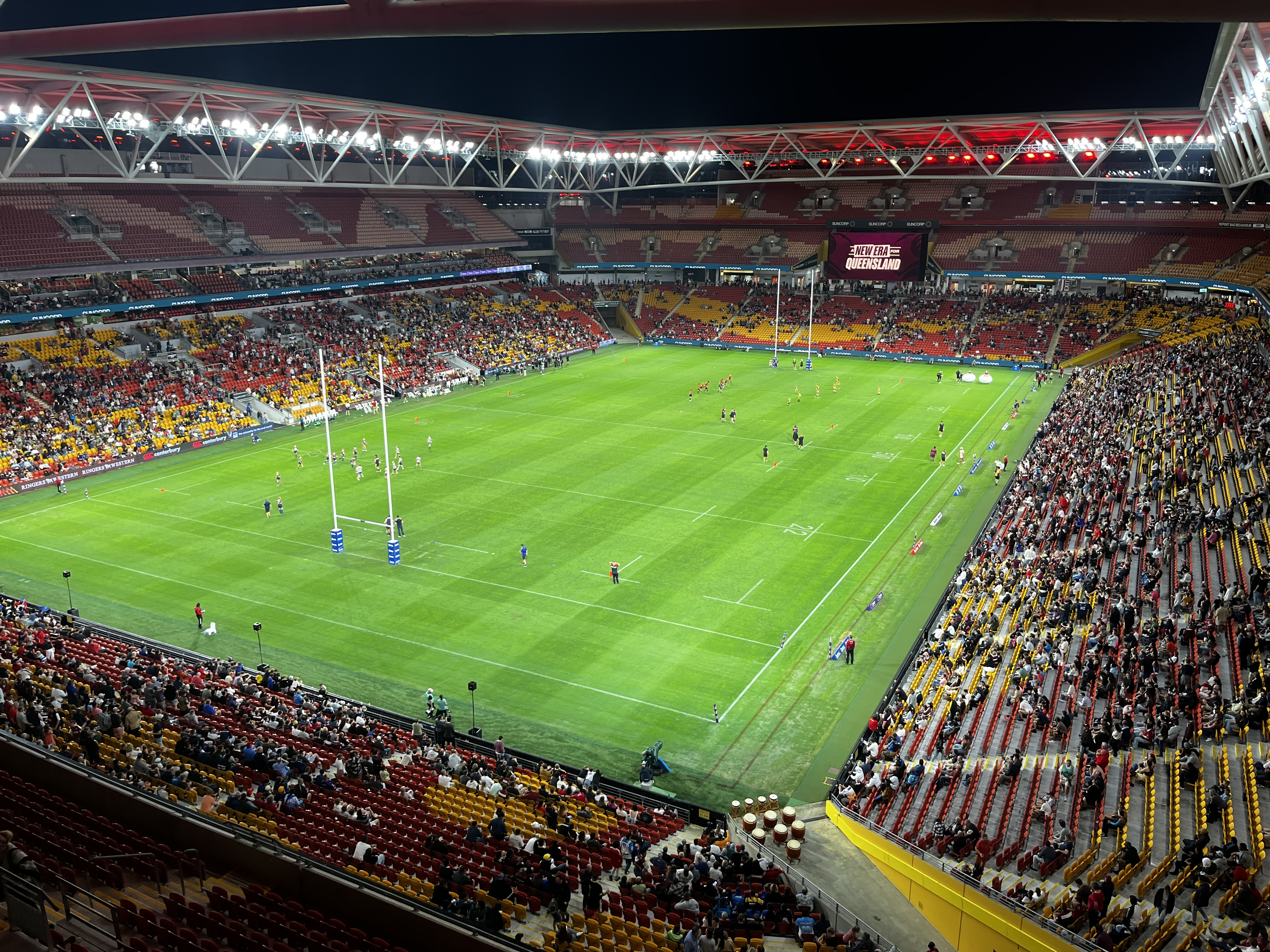
- The Reds play every home game in the 2025 season at Lang Park.
- President: Roger Gould
- Coach: Les Kiss
- Stadium: Lang Park, Milton, Brisbane, Queensland
- Super Rugby Pacific: 5th
- Super Rugby Pacific Finals: Qualifying finals (6th)
- British & Irish Lions tour: Lost
- Tonga tour: Lost
- Super Rugby AUS: 3rd
- Highest home attendance: 20,072 vs. Waratahs, 15 March
- Lowest home attendance: 8,506 vs. Force, 29 March
- Average home league attendance: 14,654
- Biggest win: 52–7 vs. Fijian Drua, (Home) 31 May
- Biggest defeat: 43–19 vs. Crusaders, (Away) 9 March
Home colours	Away colours
- All statistics correct as of 6 June 2025.

The 2025 Queensland Reds season was their 29th and most recent season in the Super Rugby since entering the professional era in 1996. Although the pre-season began in 2024 with a tour to Japan and later the United Kingdom, the domestic season began in February 2025 and finished in July with a match against the touring British & Irish Lions.

In June 2025 it was announced by Rugby Australia (RA) that a new domestic competition, Super Rugby AUS, would be begin in September 2025. The new competition would only consist of the four Australian Super Rugby franchises: the ACT Brumbies, New South Wales Waratahs, Queensland Reds, and the Western Force, and would largely be in place to support a professional pathway from amateur rugby to professional rugby, as well as non-international Australian players post-Super Rugby season.

== Squad and personnel ==
=== Coaching personnel ===
Despite being cited by news outlets as a heavy favourite for the head coach of the Australian rugby team following rumours of a possible coaching vacancy, Reds coach Les Kiss, whom signed with the Reds in 2023 on a three-year deal (2024–2026), repudiated any possibility that he would leave the team while current coach Joe Schmidt was fulfilling the role. Talking to The Sydney Morning Herald, Kiss said: "I've got too much respect for Joe to go down that path... We've got to get focused on the Reds and go forward, that's what we're excited about. It's too important." He added: "I'm loving what I'm doing at the moment, me and the rest of the staff are in a place where we're really driven and focused to do the best for the boys every day. That’s the thing we do to serve Rugby Australia."

The coaching staff was announced with the rest of the squad in November 2024, remaining unchanged from the previous season (2024).

Coaching personnel
Position	Name
Head coach	Les Kiss
Assistant Coach	Jonathan Fisher
Assistant Coach	Zane Hilton
Assistant Coach	Brad Davis
Academy/Assistant Coach	Dale Roberson

=== Squad ===
The Reds had less activity with off-season transfers compared to the previous one. All but one of the players the team picked up were from the recently terminated Australian franchise, the Melbourne Rebels.

The Reds' squad for the 2025 Super Rugby Pacific season was announced on 12 November 2024. In January 2025 Tate McDermott and Liam Wright were announced as co-captains ahead of the 2025 season.

==== Senior squad ====
Reds senior squad
**Props**: George Blake; Sef Fa'agase; **Matt Gibbon**; **Alex Hodgman**; Trevor King; Massimo de Lutiis; **Zane Nonggorr**; **Jeffery Toomaga-Allen**; **Hookers**: Richie Asiata; Max Craig; **Matt Faessler**; **Josh Nasser**; **Locks**: **Angus Blyth**; **Josh Canham**; **Lukhan Salakaia-Loto**; Ryan Smith; Connor Vest	**Loose forwards**: Joe Brial; John Bryant; **Fraser McReight**; **Seru Uru**; **Harry Wilson**; **Liam Wright** (cc); **Scrum-halves**: **Tate McDermott** (cc); Kalani Thomas; Louis Werchon; **Fly-halves**: Mason Gordon; **Tom Lynagh**; Harry McLaughlin-Phillips	**Centres**: **Josh Flook**; Frankie Goldsbrough; Isaac Henry; **Hunter Paisami**; Dre Pakeho; **Outside backs**: Lachie Anderson; **Jock Campbell**; **Filipo Daugunu**; Jude Gibbs; Will McCulloch; Heremaia Murray; Tim Ryan
(cc) denotes team co-captains, **Bold** denotes internationally capped, ^{DEV} denotes a development squad player, ^{ST} denotes a short-term signing, denotes a player ruled out for the season with injury.

==== Academy squad ====
Reds academy squad
**Props**: **Nick Bloomfield**; **Locks**: **Ben Daniels**	**Loose forwards**: **Dom Thygesen**; **Joe Liddy**	**Centres**: **Xavier Rubens**
**Bold** denotes internationally capped at youth level.

== Transfers ==
=== In ===
Date	Pos.	Player	From	Ref.
25 June 2024	Lock	Josh Canham	Melbourne Rebels	
28 June 2024	Outside back	Filipo Daugunu	Melbourne Rebels	
16 July 2024	Outside back	Lachie Anderson	Melbourne Rebels	
16 July 2024	Prop	Matt Gibbon	Melbourne Rebels	
2 August 2024	Lock	Lukhan Salakaia-Loto	Melbourne Rebels	
28 October 2024	Fly-half	Mason Gordon	Melbourne Rebels	
14 November 2024	Outside back	Heremaia Murray	Crusaders / Northland	

=== Out ===
Date	Pos.	Player	To	Ref.
31 July 2024	Prop	Peni Ravai	Fijian Drua	
August 2024	Lock	Cormac Daly	Yokohama Canon Eagles	
August 2024	Flanker	Connor Anderson	Chugoku Red Regulions	
9 September 2024	Fly-half	Lawson Creighton	Waratahs	
19 September 2024	Outside back	Taj Annan	Newcastle Knights (NRL)	
October 2024	Centre	Jordan Petaia	Los Angeles Chargers (NFL)	
4 October 2024 (Note: It was reported in September 2024 that O'Connor knocked back a contract extension offered by the Reds. The following month it was announced that he had signed to Christchurch-based Super Rugby franchise, the Crusaders.)	Fly-half	James O'Connor	Crusaders	
28 October 2024	Outside back	Mac Grealy	Western Force	
November 2024	Outside back	Suliasi Vunivalu	La Rochelle	
November 2024	Outside back	Floyd Aubrey	Souths Logan Magpies (Qld Cup) (Note: The Souths Logan Magpies are an affiliate club of National Rugby League (NRL) team the Brisbane Broncos.)	

== Season results ==
=== Pre-season ===
Reds score shown first.

2025 Pre-season results
Date	Venue	Team	Score	Result (Margin)	Ref.
Sunday, 27 October (2024)	Kumagaya Rugby Ground, Kumagaya, Saitama (Japan)	Saitama Wild Knights	59–29	Won (30 points)	
Monday, 4 November (2024)	Kumagaya Rugby Ground, Kumagaya, Saitama (Japan)	Saitama Wild Knights	42–28	Won (14 points)	
Friday, 31 January	Ashton Gate, Ashton Gate, Bristol (England)	Bristol Bears	82–21	Won (61 points)	
Friday, 7 February	Ravenhill Stadium, Belfast, Ulster (Northern Ireland)	Ulster	38–31	Won (7 points)	

=== Summary and fixtures ===
Round	1	2	3	4	5	6	7	8	9	10	11	12	13	14	15	16
Ground	—	H	A	A	H	A	H	A	H	—	H	A	A	A	H	H
Result	—	W	W	L	W	W	W	L	L	—	W	L	W	L	L	W
Position	9	3	2	5	3	3	1	3	4	4	4	4	4	4	5	5

Source: Super Rugby
A = Away; H = Home; W = Win; D = Draw; L = Loss
Notes: Positions show the situation at the end of the corresponding Game Round (GR); not the position at the conclusion of matches or game days

Reds score shown first; only non-Australian teams with flag displayed.

2025 Super Rugby season
Rnd.	Date	Venue	Team	Score	Result (Margin)	Attendance	Pos.	Ref.
1	Bye						9th	—N/a
2	Friday, 21 February	Lang Park, Milton (Brisbane)	Moana Pasifika	56–36	Won (20 points)	13,785	3rd	
3	Saturday, 1 March	Perth Rectangular Stadium, Perth	Western Force	28–24	Won (4 points)	7,377	2nd	
4	Sunday, 9 March	Rugby League Park, Addington (Christchurch)	Crusaders	19–43	Lost (24 points)	11,700	5th	
5	Saturday, 15 March	Lang Park, Milton (Brisbane)	Waratahs	35–15	Won (20 points)	20,072	3rd	
6	Saturday, 22 March	Forsyth Barr Stadium, Central Dunedin	Highlanders	29–23	Won (6 points)	12,610	3rd	
7	Saturday, 29 March	Lang Park, Milton (Brisbane)	Western Force	28–24	Won (4 points)	8,506	1st	
8	Friday, 4 April	Waikato Stadium, Hamilton	Chiefs	15–27	Lost (12 points)	9,882	3rd	
9	Saturday, 12 April	Lang Park, Milton (Brisbane)	ACT Brumbies	26–39	Lost (13 points)	12,331	4th	
10	Bye						4th	
11	Friday, 25 April	Lang Park, Milton (Brisbane)	Blues	35–21	Won (14 points)	16,924	4th	
12	Saturday, 3 May	HFC Bank Stadium, Laucala Bay (Suva)	Fijian Drua	33–36	Lost (3 points)	—N/a (Note: Attendance figures not published.)	4th	
13	Friday, 9 May	Sydney Football Stadium, Moore Park (Sydney)	Waratahs	28–21	Won (7 points)	18,945	4th	
14	Saturday, 17 May	Canberra Stadium, Bruce (Canberra)	ACT Brumbies	14–24	Lost (10 points)	11,438	4th	
15	Friday, 23 May	Lang Park, Milton (Brisbane)	Hurricanes	27–31	Lost (4 points)	18,126	5th	
16	Saturday, 31 May	Lang Park, Milton (Brisbane)	Fijian Drua	52–7	Won (45 points)	12,834	5th	
Final series
QF	Friday, 6 June	Rugby League Park, Addington (Christchurch)	Crusaders	12–32	Lost (20 points)	—N/a	—N/a	

=== Ladder ===
2025 Super Rugby Pacific ladder
Pos	Team	Pld	W	D	L	PF	PA	PD	TF	TA	TB	LB	Pts	Qualification
1	Chiefs	14	11	0	3	550	319	+231	75	45	5	2	51	Qualifying finals
2	Crusaders	14	11	0	3	471	371	+100	70	51	5	0	49	Qualifying finals
3	Brumbies	14	9	0	5	448	361	+87	66	50	4	4	44	Qualifying finals
4	Hurricanes	14	8	1	5	448	342	+106	63	46	2	3	39	Qualifying finals
5	Reds	14	8	0	6	425	371	+54	63	52	4	2	38	Qualifying finals
6	Blues	14	6	0	8	377	330	+47	55	41	5	4	33	Qualifying finals
7	Moana Pasifika	14	6	0	8	405	544	−139	60	80	2	2	28	
8	Waratahs	14	6	0	8	317	451	−134	46	67	1	1	26	
9	Force	14	4	1	9	358	472	−114	51	70	2	3	23	
10	Drua	14	4	0	10	317	465	−148	45	73	1	3	20	
11	Highlanders	14	3	0	11	332	422	−90	43	62	1	7	20	

Source: Super Rugby

=== British & Irish Lions tour ===
Reds score shown first.

2025 British & Irish Lions tour
Date	Venue	Team	Score	Result (Margin)	Ref.
Wednesday, 2 July	Lang Park, Milton (Brisbane)	British and Irish Lions	12–52	Lost (40 points)	

=== Tonga tour ===
Reds score shown first.

2025 Queensland Reds tour of Tonga
Date	Venue	Team	Score	Result (Margin)	Ref.
Friday, 15 August	Teufaiva Sport Stadium, Nukuʻalofa	Tonga	19–38	Lost (19 points)	

=== Super Rugby AUS ===
==== Summary and fixtures ====
Round	1	2	3
Ground	H	A	A
Result	W	L	W
Position	2	3	3

Source: Super Rugby
A = Away; H = Home; W = Win; D = Draw; L = Loss
Notes: Positions show the situation at the end of the corresponding Game Round (GR); not the position at the conclusion of matches or game days

2025 Super Rugby AUS
Rnd.	Date	Venue	Team	Score	Result (Margin)	Pos.	Ref.
1	Sunday, 14 September	Ballymore Stadium, Herston	Brumbies	36–26	Won (10 points)	2nd	
2	Saturday, 20 September	Dangar Park, Narrabri	Waratahs	19–47	Lost (28 points)	3rd	
3	Sunday, 28 September	Tompkins Park, Alfred Cove	Force	47–22	Won (25 points)	3rd	

=== Ladder ===
Pos	Team	Pld	W	D	L	PF	PA	PD	TF	TA	TB	LB	Pts	Qualification
1	Force	3	2	0	1	92	85	+7	15	11	2	0	10	Qualification for the Grand Final
2	Waratahs (C)	3	2	0	1	92	77	+15	13	12	1	0	9	Qualification for the Grand Final
3	Reds	3	2	0	1	102	95	+7	16	15	1	0	9	
4	Brumbies	3	0	0	3	95	124	−29	15	20	0	0	0	

Source: Rugby.com.au
Rules for classification: 1) Points; 2) Head-to-head; 3) Number of wins; 4) Point difference
(C) Champion

== Statistics ==
As of 6 June 2025; Figures do not include pre-season trials, post-season Lions tour, or 2025 Super Rugby AUS.

Top point-scorers
Pos.	Player	Position	Tries	Con.	Pen.	Drop.	Points
1	Tom Lynagh	Fly-half	4	39	2	0	104
2	Lachie Anderson	Outside back	8	0	0	0	40
3	Filipo Daugunu	Outside back	7	0	0	0	35
3	Richie Asiata	Hooker	7	0	0	0	35
5	Harry McLaughlin-Phillips	Fly-half	1	10	0	0	25
5	Tate McDermott	Scrum-half	5	0	0	0	25
7	Joe Brial	Flanker	3	0	0	0	15
7	Josh Flook	Centre	3	0	0	0	15
9	Tim Ryan	Outside back	2	0	0	0	10
9	Josh Nasser	Hooker	2	0	0	0	10
9	Matt Faessler	Hooker	2	0	0	0	10
9	Harry Wilson	Flanker	2	0	0	0	10
9	Angus Blyth	Lock	2	0	0	0	10
9	Fraser McReight	Flanker	2	0	0	0	10
9	Heremaia Murray	Outside back	2	0	0	0	10
9	Dre Pakeho	Centre	2	0	0	0	10
9	Seru Uru	Flanker	2	0	0	0	10
18	Kalani Thomas	Scrum-half	1	1	0	0	7
18	Ryan Smith	Lock	1	1	0	0	7
20	Max Craig	Hooker	1	0	0	0	5
20	Jeffery Toomaga-Allen	Prop	1	0	0	0	5
20	Jock Campbell	Outside back	1	0	0	0	5
20	Hunter Paisami	Centre	1	0	0	0	5
20	Josh Canham	Lock	1	0	0	0	5
25	Jude Gibbs	Outside back / Fly-half	0	1	0	0	2

Top try-scorers
Pos.	Player	Position	Tries
1	Lachie Anderson	Outside back	8
2	Filipo Daugunu	Outside back	7
2	Richie Asiata	Hooker	7
4	Tate McDermott	Scrum-half	5
5	Tom Lynagh	Fly-half	4
6	Joe Brial	Flanker	3
6	Josh Flook	Centre	3
8	Dre Pakeho	Centre	2
8	Heremaia Murray	Outside back	2
8	Harry Wilson	Flanker	2
8	Angus Blyth	Lock	2
8	Fraser McReight	Flanker	2
8	Matt Faessler	Hooker	2
8	Seru Uru	Flanker	2
8	Josh Nasser	Hooker	2
8	Tim Ryan	Outside back	2
18	Kalani Thomas	Scrum-half	1
18	Harry McLaughlin-Phillips	Fly-half	1
18	Ryan Smith	Lock	1
18	Hunter Paisami	Centre	1
18	Max Craig	Hooker	1
18	Jeffery Toomaga-Allen	Prop	1
18	Jock Campbell	Outside back	1
18	Josh Canham	Lock	1
