= 2024 Queensland Reds season =

Queensland Reds
2024 season
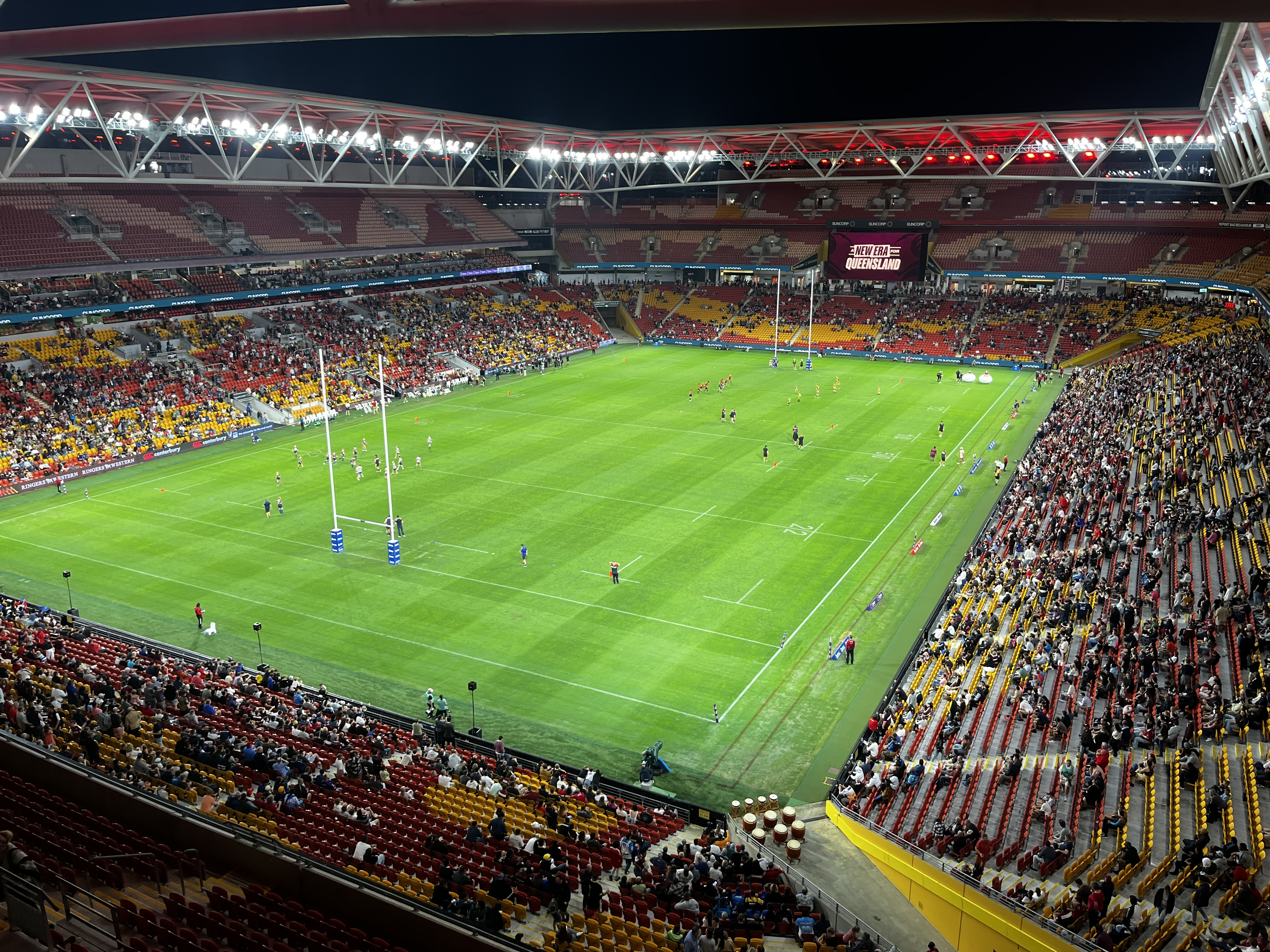
- Lang Park during half-time of the round ten fixture between the Reds and the Blues.
- Chairman: Brett Clark
- Coach: Les Kiss
- Stadium: Lang Park, Brisbane
- Super Rugby Pacific: 5th
- Super Rugby Pacific Finals: Quarter-finals
- Wales tour: Lost
- Tonga tour: Won
- Highest home attendance: 17,782 vs. ACT Brumbies; 30 March
- Lowest home attendance: 10,864 vs. Melbourne Rebels; 10 May
- Average home league attendance: 14,516
- Biggest win: 59–13 vs. Western Force (Home); 25 May
- Biggest defeat: 43–21 vs. Chiefs (Away); 7 June
Home colours	Away colours

The 2024 Queensland Reds season was the 28th Queensland Reds season in the Super Rugby since entering the professional era in 1996. In addition to the domestic competition (Super Rugby Pacific) played across the Tasman and the Pacific, the Reds also hosted Wales on their tour of Australia (July) following the conclusion of the season, and toured Tonga, playing a development XV fixture in Nukuʻalofa.

It was the third back-to-back Super Rugby Pacific season in which the Reds successfully competed in the Finals Series.

== Squad and personnel ==
=== Coaching personnel ===
Following the resignation of former Reds coach Brad Thorn at the end of the 2023 season, the Queensland Rugby Union (QRU) unveiled Queenslander Les Kiss as coach of the team just 39 days later. It was believed in June that the QRU had interest in a number of coaches with significant experience domestically and internationally. One such coach was The Sydney Morning Herald-endorsed candidate Michael Cheika. Cheika had vast top-tier experience, coaching Australia at the 2015 and 2019 Rugby World Cups (RWC), and previously won the Super Rugby with Queensland Reds rivals the New South Wales Waratahs in 2014. Cheika's coaching duties with Argentina were to end following the 2023 Rugby World Cup, making him available before the 2024 season. The other two speculated interests of the QRU were London Irish coach Les Kiss and the former Wallabies Director of Rugby Scott Johnson.

With reporting in early July pointing to Kiss being the favourite candidate, it wasn't until late July that Kiss was confirmed as the new head coach. Kiss was selected over forty-plus prospective coaches, which included former Wallaby and Tonga coach (2016–2023) Toutai Kefu, former New Zealand assistant coach (2020–2022) Brad Mooar, former Australia defence coach and Australia U20 coach Nathan Grey, and Queensland Reds assistant under Thorn Mick Heenan.

Once Kiss assumed the coaching position he brought along much of his coaching staff at London Irish.

Coaching personnel
Position	Name
Head coach	Les Kiss
Assistant Coach	Jonathan Fisher
Assistant Coach	Zane Hilton (Note: Hilton has also been cited as the Forwards Coach.)
Assistant Coach	Brad Davis
Academy Coach	Dale Roberson

=== Squad ===
==== Senior squad ====
The Queensland Reds squad for the 2024 Super Rugby Pacific season was announced in November 2023.

Reds senior squad
**Props**: George Blake; Massimo de Lutiis; Sef Fa'agase; **Alex Hodgman**; **Zane Nonggorr**; **Peni Ravai**; **Jeffery Toomaga-Allen**; **Hookers**: Richie Asiata; Max Craig; **Matt Faessler**; Josh Nasser; **Locks**: Angus Blyth; Cormac Daly; Taine Roiri; Ryan Smith; Connor Vest	**Loose forwards**: Connor Anderson; Joe Brial; John Bryant; **Fraser McReight**; Seru Uru; **Harry Wilson**; **Liam Wright** (cc); **Scrum-halves**: **Tate McDermott** (cc); Kalani Thomas; Louis Werchon; **Fly-halves**: Lawson Creighton; Tom Lynagh; Harry McLaughlin-Phillips; **James O'Connor**	**Centres**: Taj Annan; Josh Flook; Frankie Goldsbrough; Isaac Henry; **Hunter Paisami**; **Outside backs**: Floyd Aubrey; **Jock Campbell**; Mac Grealy; **Jordan Petaia**; Tim Ryan; **Suliasi Vunivalu**
(cc) denotes team co-captains, **Bold** denotes internationally capped, ^{DEV} denotes a development squad player, ^{ST} denotes a short-term signing, denotes a player ruled out for the season with injury.

==== Academy squad ====
Reds academy squad
**Props**: Nick Bloomfield; Trevor King (Note: Born in Fiji, King was raised in Gladstone, Queensland and represented the Junior Wallabies at the 2023 U20 Championship.); Baguio Johnson-Tiumalu; **Hookers**: Ollie Barrett; **Locks**: Charlie Brosnan; Ben Daniels	**Loose forwards**: Joe Liddy; Tom Robinson; **Scrum-halves**: Willem Johnstone; **Fly-halves**: Will Nason	**Centres**: Xavier Rubens; **Outside backs**: Jarrod Homan

=== Transfers ===
==== In ====
Pos.	Player	From	Ref.
Prop	Massimo de Lutiis	Canberra Royals / Reds Academy	
Prop	Alex Hodgman	Blues	
Prop	Jeffery Toomaga-Allen	Ulster	
Hooker	Max Craig	Easts / Reds Academy	
Lock	Cormac Daly	Randwick	
Lock	Taine Roiri	Sunnybank	
Back row	Joe Brial	Canterbury	
Back row	John Bryant	Souths / Reds Academy	
Fly-half	Harry McLaughlin-Phillips	Souths / Reds Academy	
Centre	Frankie Goldsbrough	Easts / Reds Academy	
Outside back	Tim Ryan	Brothers / Reds Academy	

==== Out ====
Pos.	Player	To	Ref.
Prop	Harry Hoopert	Western Force	
Prop	Phransis Sula-Siaosi	Souths	
Prop	Taniela Tupou	Melbourne Rebels	
Prop	Dane Zander	Los Angeles	
Lock	Wilson Blyth	Bond University	
Lock	Lopeti Faifua	Western Force	
Lock	Luke Jones	retired	
Lock	Jake Upfield	Bond University	
Back row	Keynan Tauakipulu	Wests	
Scrum-half	Spencer Jeans	Kyuden Voltex	
Outside back	Filipo Daugunu	Melbourne Rebels	
Outside back	Paddy James	Brothers	

== Season results ==
=== Pre-season trials ===
Reds score shown first.

2024 Pre-season trials
Date	Venue	Team	Score	Result (Margin)	Ref.
Saturday, 3 February	Ballymore Stadium, Herston (Brisbane)	Western Force	19–21	Lost (2 points)	
Saturday, 10 February	Gallas Fox Park, Roma	Waratahs	32–7	Won (25 points)	

=== Summary and fixtures ===
Round	1	2	3	4	5	6	7	8	9	10	11	12	13	14	15
Ground	H	A	H	A	A	H	—	A	H	H	A	H	A	H	A
Result	W	L	W	W	L	L	—	L	W	L	W	W	L	W	W
Position	4	4	3	2	5	5	6	6	6	6	5	5	5	5	5

Source: Super Rugby
A = Away; H = Home; W = Win; D = Draw; L = Loss
Notes: Positions show the situation at the end of the corresponding Game Round (GR); not the position at the conclusion of matches or game days

Reds score shown first; only non-Australian teams with flag displayed.

2024 Super Rugby season
Rnd.	Date	Venue	Team	Score	Result (Margin)	Attendance	Pos.	Ref.
1	Saturday, 24 February	Lang Park, Milton, (Brisbane)	Waratahs	40–22	Won (18 points)	14,593	4th	
2	Sunday, 3 March	Melbourne Rectangular Stadium, Olympic Park (Melbourne)	Hurricanes	33–38	Lost (5 points) (Note: In Golden point.)	10,339	4th	
3	Saturday, 9 March	Lang Park, Milton (Brisbane)	Chiefs	25–19	Won (6 points)	16,725	3rd	
4	Friday, 15 March	Melbourne Rectangular Stadium, Olympic Park (Melbourne)	Melbourne Rebels	53–26	Won (27 points)	—N/a	2nd	
5	Saturday, 23 March	Perth Rectangular Stadium, Perth	Western Force	31–40	Lost (9 points)	5,462	5th	
6	Saturday, 30 March	Lang Park, Milton (Brisbane)	ACT Brumbies	19–20	Lost (1 point)	17,782	5th	
7	Bye						6th	
8	Friday, 12 April	Okara Park, Morningside (Whangārei)	Moana Pasifika	14–17	Lost (3 points)	—N/a	6th	
9	Friday, 19 April	Lang Park, Milton (Brisbane)	Highlanders	31–0	Won (31 points)	13,000	6th	
10	Saturday, 27 April	Lang Park, Milton (Brisbane)	Blues	34–41	Lost (7 points)	16,325	6th	
11	Saturday, 4 May	Rugby League Park, Addington (Christchurch)	Crusaders	33–28	Won (5 points)	—N/a	5th	
12	Friday, 10 May	Lang Park, Milton (Brisbane)	Melbourne Rebels	26–22	Won (4 points)	10,864	5th	
13	Saturday, 18 May	HFC Bank Stadium, Laucala Bay (Suva)	Fijian Drua	19–28	Lost (9 points)	—N/a	5th	
14	Saturday, 25 May	Lang Park, Milton (Brisbane)	Western Force	59–13	Won (46 points)	12,321	5th	
15	Friday, 31 May	Sydney Football Stadium, Moore Park (Sydney)	Waratahs	27–26	Won (1 point)	12,018	5th	
Finals series
QF	Friday, 7 June	Waikato Stadium, Hamilton	Chiefs	21–43	Lost (22 points)	11,639	—N/a	

=== Season standings ===
2024 Super Rugby Pacific standings
Pos	Team	Pld	W	D	L	PF	PA	PD	TF	TA	TB	LB	Pts	Qualification
3	Brumbies	14	12	0	2	410	311	+99	54	41	4	0	52	Advance to Quarter-finals
4	Chiefs	14	9	0	5	486	311	+175	66	43	5	2	43	Advance to Quarter-finals
5	Reds	14	8	0	6	444	340	+104	66	46	4	4	40	Advance to Quarter-finals
6	Highlanders	14	6	0	8	305	402	−97	37	54	2	2	28	Advance to Quarter-finals
7	Drua	14	6	0	8	325	427	−102	40	60	1	1	26	Advance to Quarter-finals

Updated to match(es) played on 1 June 2024. Source: Super Rugby

=== Wales tour ===
Reds score shown first.

2024 Wales tour
Date	Venue	Team	Score	Result (Margin)	Ref.
Friday, 19 July	Lang Park, Milton (Brisbane)	Wales	35–36	Lost (1 point)	

=== Tonga tour ===
Reds score shown first.

2024 Tonga tour
Date	Venue	Team	Score	Result (Margin)	Ref.
Friday, 26 July	Teufaiva Sport Stadium, Nukuʻalofa	Tonga	41–14	Won (27 points)	

== Statistics ==
Does not include tour matches.

Top point-scorers
Pos.	Player	Position	Tries	Con.	Pen.	Drop.	Points
1	Tom Lynagh	Fly-half	0	19	6	0	56
2	Lawson Creighton	Fly-half	3	16	1	0	50
3	Tim Ryan	Wing	9	0	0	0	45
4	Matt Faessler	Hooker	8	0	0	0	40
5	Fraser McReight	Flanker	7	0	0	0	35
5	Tate McDermott	Scrum-half	7	0	0	0	35
7	Josh Flook	Centre	6	0	0	0	30
8	Harry McLaughlin-Phillips	Fly-half	0	9	1	0	21
9	Seru Uru	Lock	4	0	0	0	20
10	Jock Campbell	Fullback	3	0	0	0	15
10	Hunter Paisami	Centre	3	0	0	0	15
10	Josh Nasser	Hooker	3	0	0	0	15
10	Peni Ravai	Prop	3	0	0	0	15
14	Harry Wilson	Number eight	2	0	0	0	10
14	Suliasi Vunivalu	Wing	2	0	0	0	10
14	Jeffery Toomaga-Allen	Prop	2	0	0	0	10
14	Penalty try						10
18	Zane Nonggorr	Prop	1	0	0	0	5
18	Liam Wright	Flanker	1	0	0	0	5
18	Jordan Petaia	Wing / Centre	1	0	0	0	5
18	Ryan Smith	Lock	1	0	0	0	5
18	Floyd Aubrey	Wing	1	0	0	0	5
18	George Blake	Prop	1	0	0	0	5
24	James O'Connor	Fly-half	0	2	0	0	4

Top try-scorers
Pos.	Player	Position	Tries
1	Tim Ryan	Wing	9
2	Matt Faessler	Hooker	8
3	Fraser McReight	Flanker	7
3	Tate McDermott	Scrum-half	7
5	Josh Flook	Centre	6
6	Seru Uru	Lock	4
7	Jock Campbell	Fullback	3
7	Lawson Creighton	Fly-half	3
7	Hunter Paisami	Centre	3
7	Josh Nasser	Hooker	3
7	Peni Ravai	Prop	3
12	Harry Wilson	Number eight	2
12	Suliasi Vunivalu	Wing	2
12	Jeffery Toomaga-Allen	Prop	2
12	Penalty try		2
16	Zane Nonggorr	Prop	1
16	Liam Wright	Flanker	1
16	Jordan Petaia	Wing / Centre	1
16	Ryan Smith	Lock	1
16	Floyd Aubrey	Wing	1
16	George Blake	Prop	1
