= Treyvon Pritchard =

Australian rugby union player

- Born: 4 April 2007 (age 19) Auckland, New Zealand
- Height: 187 cm (6 ft 2 in)
- Weight: 90 kg (198 lb; 14 st 2 lb)
- School: St Peters Lutheran College; Anglican Church Grammar School
- Notable relative: Kadin Pritchard (brother)

Rugby union career
- Position(s): Centre, Wing, Fullback
- Current team: Reds
Youth career
- 2019–2022: St Peters Lutheran College 1st XV
- 2020–2021: Wests Bulldogs
- 2023–2025: Churchie 1st XV
- 2023–2025: Reds Academy
- 2023–: Brothers
Senior career
Years	Team	Apps	(Points)
2026–	Reds	12	(10)
- Correct as of 8 July 2026
International career
Years	Team	Apps	(Points)
2023	Australia U18		
2026	Australia U20	4	(20)
- Correct as of 12 July 2026

Treyvon Pritchard (born 4 April 2007) is an Australian rugby union player who plays for the Reds in the Super Rugby. His position is centre, wing or fullback.

== Early life ==
Pritchard was born in Auckland, New Zealand in 2007 to a New Zealand father and a Ghanaian mother. He was raised in an athletic family, with brother Kadin playing professional rugby for the ACT Brumbies in the Super Rugby alongside sister Aiyana who played Australian rules football for the Brisbane Lions Women Academy in the U18 National Championships and the Sherwood Magpies in the QAFL Women's league.

Pritchard attended St Peters Lutheran College in Ipswich's Springfield suburb, and transferred to Anglican Church Grammar School in East Brisbane in 2023.

== Career ==
=== Youth career ===
While at St Peters, Treyvon and his Brother Kadin represented the school's 1st XV team at the Associated Independent Colleges (AIC) rugby competitions. Around 2020, Pritchard also played junior rugby for the Wests Bulldogs in Brisbane, and by 2023, Pritchard was playing for the Churchie 1st XV and the Reds Academy after impressing at the Emerging Reds Cup earlier in the year. Pritchard represented the Australia U18s squad while at Churchie, and also joined the Brothers Rugby Club in the Brisbane Premier Rugby competition.

=== Reds ===
Pritchard debuted for the Reds in a 2025 Reds post-season tour match against the Japanese Saitama Wild Knights in October 2025, having signed a formal professional contract with the side in July 2025. He was then named in the Reds squad for the 2026 Super Rugby season. He made his debut for the Reds in the fourth round of the season against the Brumbies.

In May 2026, Treyvon and his brother Kadin Pritchard had reportedly met with officials of the Papua New Guinea Chiefs, the newest National Rugby League (NRL) expansion team whom were confirmed to kick off their first season in 2028. Treyvon later stated that the meeting was just talks, and that nothing was "set in stone."

On 12 July 2026, while playing for Australia U20 against Wales U20 in the 2026 World Rugby Junior World Championship in Georgia, Pritchard broke his right leg (syndesmosis injury) following a "hip-drop tackle" by an opposing player. He was flown back to Australia where he underwent surgery and did not return until November. Despite the severe injury, the tackle technique used was not banned in rugby union, although had been outlawed in the National Rugby League and National Football League.

In late July 2026, Pritchard, who was off-contract at the conclusion of the 2027 Super Rugby season, was revealed to have had turned down a potential deal with the PNG Chiefs expansion club in the NRL, as well as an offer from the Sydney Roosters, both for the 2028 NRL season. He subsequently signed a two-year contract extension to remain in Australian rugby, alongside brother Kadin with the Brumbies.

== Career statistics ==
=== Club ===
As of 12 July 2026.

Statistics by club, season and competition
Club	Season	League			
Club	Season	Division	Apps	Tries	Points
Reds	2026	Super Rugby Pacific	12	2	10
Reds	2027	Super Rugby Pacific	TBD		
Career total			12	2	10

== Awards and honours ==
Individual

- Rugby Australia Men's Rookie of the Year: 2026
