= Ryan Smith (rugby union, born 1996) =

Australian rugby union player (born 1996)

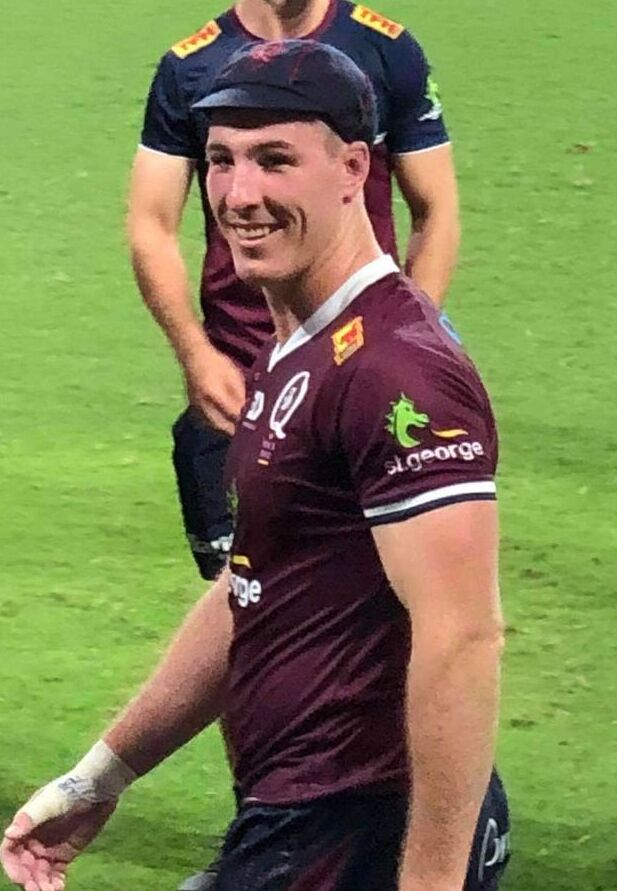
- Born: Ryan Nelson Raymund Smith; 30 September 1996 (age 30) Toowoomba, Queensland, Australia
- Height: 1.99 m (6 ft 6 in)
- Weight: 117 kg (18 st 6 lb)
- School: St Patrick's College, Shorncliffe

Rugby union career
- Position: Lock
- Current team: Ospreys
Senior career
Years	Team	Apps	(Points)
2019	Brisbane City	6	(0)
2020–2025	Queensland Reds	76	(42)
2025–	Ospreys	17	(5)
International career
Years	Team	Apps	(Points)
2022–2024	Australia A	6	(0)

Ryan Nelson Raymund Smith (born 30 September 1996) is an Australian rugby union lock currently playing for the Ospreys in the United Rugby Championship (URC). He previously played for the Queensland Reds in Super Rugby, where he served as captain and has represented the Australia A team.

== Early life ==
Born in Toowoomba, Smith moved to Caboolture during his early childhood before relocating to Brighton for his schooling years.

Smith began playing rugby union in 2000 with his junior club, the Caboolture Snakes. He later played senior club rugby for Brothers. During his final year at St. Patrick’s, Smith was swimming captain and co-captain of the track and field team. He also represented the 2013 1st XV rugby side that finished fifth overall in the AIC competition.

After finishing school, Smith joined the Brothers colts program and progressed into the grades system in 2015. He made his Queensland Premier Rugby debut for Brothers in 2017. During this period, he also completed a trade qualification through TAFE Queensland and worked as an air conditioning and refrigeration mechanic.

== Club career ==
=== Queensland Reds ===
==== 2019 ====
Smith was named in Brisbane City's 33-man squad for the 2019 National Rugby Championship season on 26 August. He made his NRC debut in the opening round on 31 August at GPS Rugby Club. A late try secured a 22–22 draw against the defending NRC champions, Fijian Drua.

In Round 4 against NSW Country, an attacking move initiated by Mark Nawaqanitawase broke down near Brisbane City's try line. Smith recovered the loose ball and launched a counter-attack, linking with the outside backs to put City ahead 24–5 with less than 10 minutes remaining. The try was shortlisted among the top five for 2019 NRC Try of the Year.

City were unable to defend the Andy Purcell Cup in a 42–26 loss to Queensland Country on 28 September. In the 18th minute of his derby debut, Smith received his first and only NRC yellow card.

Brisbane City finished fourth overall and advanced to the NRC finals. The team was eliminated in the semi-final on 19 October, losing 42–38 to the Western Force. This marked Smith’s final appearance for the side.

==== 2020 ====
Smith first featured for the Reds during a 28–19 pre-season trial victory over the Waratahs in Dalby on 24 January. He then joined the Brumbies in early February for an opportunity to train with the club. Smith started at lock in the Brumbies Runners trial match against Waratahs A on 21 February in Daceyville. He made another start on 6 March against Rebels A at Harlequin Rugby Club.

The lock returned to Queensland in April and received a call-up to the Reds' Super Rugby squad in May 2020, as the team prepared for the domestic Super Rugby AU competition following the COVID-19 disruption. He was first listed in a Reds 23-man match-day squad on the bench for a potential debut against the Force on 17 July, but did not take the field. On 7 December, it was announced that Smith had signed with the Reds in a deal that would see him remain at Ballymore until 2022.

==== 2021 ====
Smith made his Super Rugby debut in Round 1 on 19 February in a 41–7 victory over the Waratahs at Suncorp Stadium. He entered the match as a 68th-minute substitute wearing jersey No. 19 and became Queensland Reds player #1357. Smith made his Super Rugby starting debut at lock in Round 6 against the Waratahs on 27 March.

The Reds ended their ten-year championship drought and claimed the 2021 Super Rugby AU title on 8 May. Smith started at lock in the come-from-behind 19–16 grand final victory over the Brumbies. At Queensland’s end-of-season awards lunch held at Sirromet winery, Mount Cotton on 18 July, Smith was named Rookie of the Year.

==== 2022 ====
Smith scored his maiden Super Rugby try on 25 February, as Queensland claimed the Bob Templeton Cup in a rain-soaked match against the Waratahs. The try proved to be the match-winner, with the Reds holding on to win 20–16 at Leichhardt Oval.

Smith's first career try at home came after a 17-phase attack. He broke an attempted tackle by Josh Dickson, went to ground, then regained his feet to score, putting the Reds ahead 19–13. It wasn’t enough, however, as the Highlanders came back to win 27–19.

Smith scored his second try in as many weeks, crossing in the 39th minute against the Blues on 14 May. The try came from a pick-and-go and brought his season total to a career-best three tries.

As one of five QRU Indigenous Program ambassadors for the 2022 season, Smith took part in the Indigenous Round launch and photo shoot ahead of the clash against Moana Pasifika on 20 May.

Smith won the 2022 "Spirit of the Reds" award. The Reds announced on 29 June that Smith had signed a two-year extension with the club.

==== 2023 ====
Late in the first half of Queensland's second pre-season trial against the Waratahs in Narrabri, Smith left the field with a shoulder injury. He returned to play in the opening round of Super Rugby Pacific against the Hurricanes at Queensland Country Bank Stadium, with several other locks unavailable due to injury. In the 34th minute of that match, he received his first Super Rugby yellow card for impeding Jordie Barrett on a kick-and-chase.

His first try of the season, which was also the opening try of the match, came on 5 March during the Super Round match against the Force. The Reds' 71–20 victory set a new record for the most points scored in Queensland Super Rugby history.

Smith scored his second try of the season on 25 March against the Rebels, peeling off the back of a rolling maul and carrying Monty Ioane over the line from close range. In the 77th minute, a potential go-ahead try by Tate McDermott was disallowed after Smith was penalised for holding back Rebels flanker Josh Kemeny.

In the final match of the regular season on 3 June, Smith scored the Reds’ opening try in the 8th minute from a set-piece play. Queensland went on to lose 41–17 to the Drua, a result that secured the Fijians their maiden Super Rugby finals berth in just their second season.

==== 2024 ====
On 12 April, Smith earned his 50th cap for the Reds in a 17–14 loss to Moana at Semenoff Stadium in Whangārei. In his next appearance on 19 April, he celebrated his 50th Super Rugby cap by scoring his first try of the 2024 season just 27 minutes into a 31–0 victory over the Highlanders.

Ahead of their quarter-final against the Chiefs, Smith and fellow Brothers junior Josh Flook re-committed to the Reds for the 2025 season.

In the 2024 Super Rugby season, Smith topped the tackle count for the Reds and recorded more tackles than any other lock in the competition. He completed 207 tackles with a 93% success rate, ranking fourth overall behind flankers, Carlo Tizzano (240), Dalton Papali’i (208) and Billy Harmon (208).

On 19 July, Smith started against Wales in the final match of their 2024 Australia tour. Wales entered the fixture after a 2–0 Test series defeat to the Wallabies. In a narrow 36–35 loss, Jock Campbell became the 127th captain in Queensland history, with Smith serving as vice-captain for the first time.

Smith was selected to captain the Reds on their two-game tour of Japan against the Saitama Wild Knights at Kumagaya Rugby Ground. He scored in the opening match, an uncapped trial against the Wild Knights, contributing to a 59–29 victory. On 4 November, Smith became the 128th captain in Reds history. He opened the scoring as his side secured a 42–28 victory and retained the Queensland-Saitama Shield.

==== 2025 ====
The Reds played their first match of the 2025 season after a bye in Round 1, defeating Moana 56–36 at home. Smith scored his eighth professional try in the match and dedicated it to his firstborn with a post-try celebration, facing the crowd and cradling his arms.

On 29 March, Smith captained the Reds for the first time in a Super Rugby match. He led the team to a 28–24 victory over the Force in the absence of Wallabies trio Harry Wilson (rested), Fraser McReight (rested), and Liam Wright (injured). Usual co-captain Tate McDermott returned via the bench and scored the decisive try, securing top spot on the Super Rugby ladder for the first time in 13 years.

Smith made his final ANZAC Round appearance for the Reds on 25 April, coming off the bench in a 35–21 victory against the Blues—Queensland’s first ANZAC Day match since 1998. It was the first time in his professional career that he wore the No. 20 jersey. The game marked the introduction of the Sellars Dixon Medal, which was awarded to the Player of the Match Tom Lynagh.

Smith played every minute of his final Super Rugby home match on 31 May. He assisted the second try of Lachie Anderson’s record-breaking four-try first-half haul. With the last play of the game, Smith kicked the first conversion of his professional career.

Smith’s final Super Rugby match was a 32–12 quarter-final loss to the Crusaders. He contributed to the Reds’ opening score by winning the line-out that set up a rolling maul try.

On 3 July, Smith made his 76th and final appearance for the Reds in a match against the British & Irish Lions during their 2025 Australia tour. He came off the bench as the Reds lost 52–12 in front of a crowd of 46,435. Man of the match honours went to Jac Morgan, captain of Smith’s next club, Ospreys. In a post-match press conference, Smith described Morgan as “world-class.”

=== Ospreys ===
==== 2025–26 ====
On 23 April, it was announced that Smith would leave the Reds to join the Ospreys on a two-year deal ahead of the 2025–26 United Rugby Championship season.

Smith missed the opening five rounds of the season through injury. He was initially named to make his Ospreys debut in the Welsh derby against Dragons RFC on 25 October in Round 5, but was a late withdrawal from the side.

He eventually made his debut on 29 November against Edinburgh at Hive Stadium, starting in the back row and becoming Osprey #310. With 22 Ospreys players unavailable through injury and international duty, the side was defeated 19–17.

He made his European debut on 7 December in an EPCR Challenge Cup match against Connacht at the Brewery Field in Bridgend. In the 67th minute, Smith scored his first Ospreys try from a close-range pick-and-go as the side recovered from a 21-point deficit to win 24–21.

Smith played in his first Welsh derby against Cardiff on 1 January, helping the Ospreys to a 33–22 victory. His performance earned him selection in both the Opta Sports European Rugby Team of the Week and the Fantasy URC Team of the Week.

On 23 January, the Ospreys recorded a 24–24 bonus-point draw against the Lions. Smith was named Man of the Match for his performance in difficult weather conditions. He was subsequently named the Ospreys Supporters Club’s Player of the Month for January.

Smith started from the Ospreys bench for the first time in Round 14 of the URC. In early April, WalesOnline ranked him ninth in its list of the top 10 players in Welsh rugby. He featured in the final match of the season, a 27–20 win over the Scarlets, completing the West Wales Derby double and securing the Welsh Shield. On 31 August, Smith was named the Ospreys Supporters Club's 2025–26 Player of the Season following a fan vote.

== Career statistics ==
As of 14 August 2026:

=== Super Rugby ===
Season	Team	Apps	Start	Sub	Mins	T	Con	Pts	YC	RC
2021	Reds	14	8	6	536	0	0	0	0	0
2022	Reds	15	12	3	1035	3	0	15	0	0
2023	Reds	14	10	4	780	3	0	15	1	0
2024	Reds	15	14	1	1069	1	0	5	0	0
2025	Reds	13	10	3	717	1	1	7	1	0
Total		71	54	17	4137	8	1	42	2	0

=== United Rugby Championship ===
Season	Team	Apps	Start	Sub	Mins	T	Con	Pts	YC	RC
2025/26	Ospreys	12	11	1	823	0	0	0	1	0
2026/27	Ospreys	2	1	1	92	0	0	0	0	0
Total		14	12	2	915	0	0	0	1	0

=== EPCR Challenge Cup ===
Season	Team	Apps	Start	Sub	Mins	T	Con	Pts	YC	RC
2025/26	Ospreys	3	3	0	227	1	0	5	0	0
2026/27	Ospreys	0	0	0	0	0	0	0	0	0
Total		3	3	0	227	1	0	5	0	0

== International career ==
=== 2022 ===
In the opening round of the 2022 World Rugby Pacific Nations Cup on 2 July, Smith made his Australia A debut against Samoa. He received his first international yellow card in the 19th minute of the match, which Australia A went on to lose 31–26 at ANZ Stadium in Suva, Fiji. Smith’s first Australia A win came in his next match, a 32–18 victory over Fiji on 9 July at Churchill Park.

Smith represented Australia A in the Asahi Super Dry Japan Rugby Challenge Series 2022: a three match series against the Japan XV. He came off the bench for the series opener on 1 October at Chichibunomiya Rugby Stadium and started in the third and final match on 14 October at Yodoko Sakura Stadium. Australia A won the series 2–1.

=== 2023 ===
Smith earned his first Wallabies call-up after coach Eddie Jones made seven changes to a 33-man training squad due to injuries. He joined the national side for a three-day training camp held at Sanctuary Cove beginning on 17 April.

=== 2024 ===
On 21 June, Joe Schmidt named his first 38-man squad as Wallabies coach. Smith was one of 13 uncapped players originally selected for the July Test series against Wales and Georgia.

Following the Reds' two-game tour of Japan, Smith joined Rod Seib's Australia XV squad for their two-game UK Tour. Smith started the opening match on 8 November, from the bench after playing for Queensland just four days prior. The Australians were held to a 10–10 error-strewn draw against the Bristol Bears at Ashton Gate. Smith vice-captained Australia XV for the first time on 17 November in a 38–17 loss to England A at Twickenham Stoop.

== Media ==
=== 2022 ===
On 29 June, Nine News Queensland aired a feature story titled Tools of the Trade, following Smith’s two-year contract extension with the Reds. The segment highlighted his progression from refrigeration mechanic to mainstay in the Reds forward pack and included footage of Smith in his hi-vis workwear, work ute, and dog Cobber on the job.

=== 2023 ===
Smith later hosted the Queensland Reds' official podcast, Socks Up with Ryan Smith, which ran for two seasons from 2023 to 2024. Produced in partnership with Triple M, the podcast featured a guest before each home game—often a fellow Reds player—and offered fans behind-the-scenes access, exclusive news, and player insights.

Season 1 aired in 2023, with the first episode released on February 22, featuring Wallabies captain Harry Wilson as the inaugural guest.

=== 2024 ===
Season 2 premiered on February 22. Fellow Reds player Matt Faessler joined as co-host in Episode 2, which featured Cormac Daly and was released on March 8.

=== 2025 ===
Smith co-hosted Season 3, Episode 2 of Under the Surface, the Reds’ documentary series, published on May 7. He interviewed fellow players ahead of the ANZAC Day fixture against the Blues, offering insights into team preparation and spirit.
