= Dre Pakeho =

Australian rugby union player

- Born: 20 January 2005 (age 21) Penrith, Australia
- Height: 181 cm (5 ft 11 in)
- Weight: 102 kg (225 lb)
- School: Anglican Church Grammar School

Rugby union career
- Position: Centre
- Current team: Reds
Senior career
Years	Team	Apps	(Points)
2025–	Reds	13	(10)
- Correct as of 6 June 2025

Dre Pakeho (born 20 January 2005) is an Australian rugby union player, who plays for the Reds. His preferred position is centre.

== Early career ==
Born in Sydney, Pakeho's New Zealand-born parents took their young family to the Waikato when he was two. At eight, he returned to Brisbane. His first junior rugby club in Brisbane was the Pine Rivers Pumas in 2014. Pakeho attended Anglican Church Grammar School for Years 11 and 12 where he played rugby for their first XV. He was a member of the Queensland academy and plays his club rugby for Brothers.

== Professional career ==
Pakeho signed his first contract with the Reds in September 2024. He was named in the Reds squad for the 2025 Super Rugby Pacific season, and made his debut for the side in round 3 of the season against the Force.
