= Jock Campbell (rugby union) =

Australian rugby union player (born 1995)

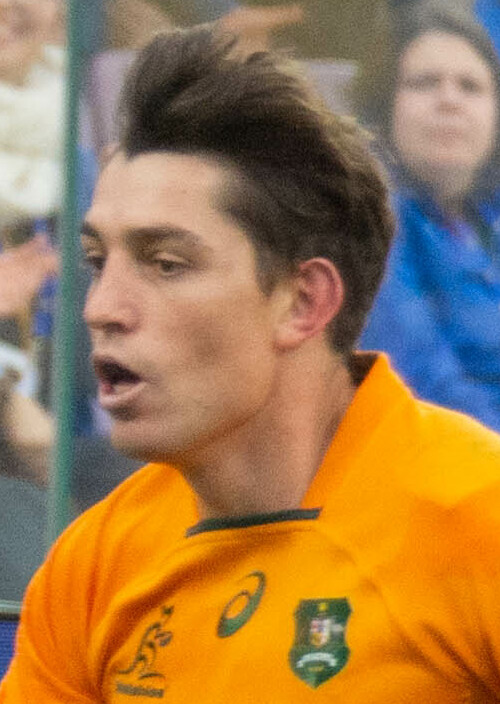
- Campbell with Australia in 2022
- Full name: Jock Hunter Campbell
- Born: 17 May 1995 (age 31) Inverell, New South Wales, Australia
- Height: 186 cm (6 ft 1 in)
- Weight: 85 kg (187 lb; 13 st 5 lb)
- School: The Southport School

Rugby union career
- Position(s): Fullback, Wing
- Current team: Yamaha Blue Revs
Youth career
- –2008: Inverell Highlanders
- 2008–2013: TSS 1st & 2nd XV
Amateur team(s)
| Years | Team | Apps | (Points) |
| 2014–2026 | University of Queensland | | |
Senior career
| Years | Team | Apps | (Points) |
| 2017–2019 | Queensland Country | 21 | (45) |
| 2019–2026 | Reds | 102 | (159) |
| 2026– | Yamaha Blue Revs | 0 | (0) |
- Correct as of 1 November 2026
International career
| Years | Team | Apps | (Points) |
| 2022–2024 | Australia A | 5 | (0) |
| 2022– | Australia | 6 | (10) |
| 2025 | ANZAC XV | 1 | (0) |
- Correct as of 11 July 2026

Jock Hunter Campbell (born 17 May 1995) is an Australian rugby union player who plays for the Shizuoka Blue Revs in the Japan Rugby League One, and the Australia national team. His playing position is wing and fullback.

== Early life ==
Campbell was born in 1995 in the Northern New South Wales town of Inverell. Growing up he played junior rugby for the Inverell Highlanders alongside his older sister, Tina. In 2022, Jock and Tina became the first brother and sister duo to play for Queensland in both the Super Rugby Pacific and the Super W.

Campbell was educated at The Southport School (TSS) on the Gold Coast in South East Queensland (SEQ) between 2008 and 2012. During his time at TSS, Campbell played with the schools 2nd XV rugby side in 2013. Campbell later played for the University of Queensland in the Brisbane Premier Rugby competition, forming part of their 2017 title side.

== Career ==
Prior to professional rugby, Campbell had joined the University of Queensland in the Queensland Premier Rugby competition after leaving school. At the 2016 Hong Kong 10s, an event considered to be a warm-up for the Hong Kong Sevens on the World Rugby Sevens Tour, Campbell was a part of the King's College university team that entered the tournament as the tenth seed. Campbell scored the opening try of the tournament and was considered a standout player. His performance at the event had even lead to offers from French clubs.

=== Queensland Country ===
In March 2017, Campbell was one of seven outside backs included in the Queensland Country squad announcement ahead of the 2017 National Rugby Championship season.

Campbell was a part of the team in the 2018 season as well, being named in the squad announcement in August. Campbell scored seven tries for the Queensland Country across nine games as the team finished in its second grand final appearance from two seasons. Following their third round, thirty-point win over the Fijian Drua, which saw him score a double, Campbell was nominated as the NRC Rising Star for round three. At the time, Campbell had scored five tries from three matches (which became six from four the following round), and was the second-highest try-scorer of the season, behind the Melbourne Rising's Tom English.

=== Reds ===
Following his two seasons in the National Rugby Championship (NRC), Campbell was signed by the Queensland Reds of the Super Rugby ahead of the 2019 season under new coach Brad Thorn. Ahead of the Reds's two-week tour of South Africa for rounds nine and ten, Campbell was included in a 27-man squad. On 13 April 2019, Campbell made his Super Rugby debut against the Bulls at Loftus Versfeld Stadium in Pretoria. Being substituted on for wing Aidan Toua in the 64th minute, the Reds lost 32–17. The following week, Campbell made another appearance from the bench in the Reds' second away win of the season. Campbell was subbed on for Jack Hardy on the wing in a 14–21 win at Kings Park Stadium in Durban. It was the Reds' first win in Durban since the 2004 season.

Campbell played in nine matches across the 2019 season, starting in seven, and scoring two tries. The 2019 Reds season was poor and racked with injuries: the team finished second-last on the ladder, and achieved just six wins from 16 games in a squad filled with youth and inexperience. Campbell however, was considered a good debutant, and was later named the Queensland Reds Rookie of the Year. At the end of 2019, Campbell signed a three-year deal with the Reds, staying at the club until 2022.

Campbell started in every match for the Reds' 2020 season, which was suspended in mid-March due to the COVID-19 pandemic. Campbell had even taken up kicking duties between rounds three and five, having been promoted by coach Brad Thorn after Bryce Hegarty was demoted from fullback to the bench despite having a 100% goal-kicking success rate (9/9). Campbell reportedly had a kicking success rate of 57%, only slotting 12 goals from 21 attempts across three games.

In the 2020 Super Rugby AU season, Campbell started in every match, shifting early on from right-wing to fullback. Campbell scored one try, and made his first Super Rugby grand final appearance against the Rod Macqueen Cup rivals, the Brumbies, in the competitions inaugural Grand Final. The Reds lost 28–23 in Canberra.

In the second Super Rugby AU season, Campbell played in all but one of the Reds' games, scoring two tries en route to the final. The Reds ultimately won however, 19–16, at home. It was Campbell's first major trophy with the side. He later featured in just two appearances in the Super Rugby Trans-Tasman, after suffering from a groin injury.

The following season, the inaugural season of the Super Rugby Pacific (2022), Campbell scored a total of eight tries, switching between wing and fullback, including a back-to-back double, the first in his career. The Reds finished seventh on the season ladder, and were knocked out in the quarter-finals by the Crusaders. In May 2022, the Queensland Reds announced that Campbell had signed another two-year deal to remain at the club.

Campbell, although not noted for an outstanding season, was given the captains armband in the Reds' post-season match against Wales in 2024. Wales, whom were on their first tour of Australia since 2012, won the match 36–35. It was Campbell's first match as captain, the 127th in the teams history.

In a February 2025 RugbyPass article analysing Australia's player depth, Campbell was mentioned as being in the top three at fullback, behind the Brumbies' Tom Wright, however the author also mentioned his drop in form over the years, stating: "Campbell was quality when he made his Wallabies debut in 2022 under Dave Rennie, should he rediscover his top form then he could force himself into Schmidt's plans." In July 2025, Campbell was named captain of the Queensland Reds ahead of their match against the British & Irish Lions, whom were on their first tour of Australia since 2013. Campbell lead the team in a match for just the second time in his career, and his first since 2024. Queensland lost 12–52. Campbell signed a contract extension to stay at the Reds until 2026.

Campbell had a resurgent 2026 season. Playing in all but one match for the Reds in the Super Rugby, and making his 100th Queensland cap, he scored three tries, seven try assists, and lead the competition in run metres, averaging more than 100 metres per game, while also ranking among the competition leaders for offloads, try assists and defenders beaten. Campbell also racked up 1,025 carry metres, more than any other player in the competition. Campbell was also voted the best fullback of the season, and was named in the inaugural Super Rugby Team of the Year for the 2026 season.

The Sydney Morning Herald noted that after recovering from a hamstring injury suffered late in 2025, Campbell returned with improved speed and became one of the Reds' key players, and added that despite not having played for the Wallabies since earning four caps in 2022, Campbell has used 2026 to re-establish himself as a contender for the national side.

=== Japan ===
In July 2026, Campbell, whom had turned down another contract extension with the Reds, was reportedly heading to a club in Japan, although no details were confirmed. On 1 November 2026, the Shizuoka Blue Revs announced the signing of Campbell via their Instagram account. Campbell joined fellow Wallaby Hunter Paisami, and filled the team's third Category C player slot following the departure of Kwagga Smith a week earlier.

== International career ==
In March 2022, Campbell was included in an April three-day Australia national team training camp on the Gold Coast, alongside seven other uncapped international players. In June, Campbell was named in a 29-man Australia A squad for the Pacific Nations Cup. Campbell made his international debut in the first round against Samoa in a 26–31 loss in Suva, Fiji. Campbell went on to start in the remaining two matches as Australia finished tournament runners-up.

Following the conclusion of the Pacific Nations Cup, Campbell was called up to the Wallabies squad in July 2022 in preparation for their two-Test tour against Argentina in the 2022 Rugby Championship. Campbell did not make an appearance for the team, although was later recalled into the Wallabies camp for their 2022 Spring Tour. Campbell made his international debut for Australia against Scotland at Murrayfield Stadium, Edinburgh on 29 October 2022, coming off the bench in the 66th minute for Tom Banks. Australia won 16–15.

In his second appearance for the Wallabies, Campbell, who started at fullback, replacing Tom Banks who had been ruled out with an ankle injury, made 82 metres from seven runs, beat three defenders, and scored his first international try as well as a try assist, in what was a one-point defeat to France at the Stade de France. In total, Campbell played four matches on the Spring Tour.

In 2023 and 2024, Campbell made two appearances for Australia A against Tonga and England A, respectively.

After a four-year absence, Campbell was called up to the Wallabies squad in June 2026 ahead of their three Nations Championship Tests. On 2 July 2026, Campbell was named as the Wallabies' starting fullback ahead of their opening Nations Championship match against Ireland at the Sydney Football Stadium. It marked 1,316 days since his last international match, the eleventh longest period in the professional era, behind Greg Holmes. On his return Test, Campbell scored his second international try in a 31–33 defeat to Ireland in Sydney.

== Career statistics ==
=== Club ===
As of 23 June 2026.

Statistics by club, season and competition
| Club | Season | League | | | | | | |
| Club | Season | Division | Apps | Tries | Con. | Pen. | Drop | Points |
|---|---|---|---|---|---|---|---|---|
| Queensland Country | 2017 | National Rugby Championship | 5 | 2 | — | | | 10 |
| Queensland Country | 2018 | National Rugby Championship | 9 | 7 | — | | | 35 |
| Queensland Country | 2019 | National Rugby Championship | 7 | 0 | — | | | 0 |
| Queensland Country | Total | | 21 | 9 | — | | | 45 |
| Reds | 2019 | Super Rugby | 9 | 2 | — | | | 10 |
| Reds | 2020 | Super Rugby | 7 | 1 | 9 | 3 | 0 | 32 |
| Reds | 2020 | Super Rugby AU | 10 | 1 | — | | | 5 |
| Reds | 2021 | Super Rugby AU | 8 | 2 | — | | | 15 |
| Reds | 2021 | Super Rugby Trans-Tasman | 2 | 0 | — | | | 0 |
| Reds | 2022 | Super Rugby Pacific | 13 | 8 | — | | | 40 |
| Reds | 2023 | Super Rugby Pacific | 14 | 2 | — | | | 10 |
| Reds | 2024 | Super Rugby Pacific | 17 (Note: Fifteen appearances were in the Super Rugby, with an additional two in post-season tour matches: one against Tonga and one Wales.) | 3 | — | | | 15 |
| Reds | 2025 | Super Rugby Pacific | 14 (Note: Ten appearances were in the Super Rugby, three were in the Super Rugby AUS, and one was in the 2025 Lions tour series.) | 1 | — | | | 5 |
| Reds | 2026 | Super Rugby Pacific | 14 | 3 | 6 | 0 | 0 | 27 |
| Reds | Total | | 108 | 23 | 15 | 3 | 0 | 154 |
| Career total | | | 129 | 32 | 15 | 3 | 0 | 199 |

=== International ===
As of 11 July 2026.

Statistics by team and year
| Team | Year | Statistic | | | | | |
| Team | Year | Apps | Tries | Con. | Pen. | Drop | Points |
|---|---|---|---|---|---|---|---|
| Australia A | 2022 | 3 | 0 | — | | | 0 |
| Australia A | 2023 | 1 | 0 | — | | | 0 |
| Australia A | 2024 | 1 | 0 | — | | | 0 |
| Total | | 5 | 0 | — | | | 0 |
| Australia | 2022 | 4 | 1 | — | | | 5 |
| Australia | 2026 | 2 | 1 | — | | | 5 |
| Total | | 6 | 2 | — | | | 10 |

=== International tries ===
List of international tries scored by Jock Campbell
| No. | Opponent | Location | Competition | Date | Result | Ref. |
|---|---|---|---|---|---|---|
| 1 | France | Stade de France, Saint-Denis | 2022 Autumn Internationals | 5 November 2022 | 30–29 | |
| 2 | Ireland | Sydney Football Stadium, Sydney | 2026 Nations Championship | 4 July 2026 | 31–33 | |

== Awards and honours ==
Reds

- Super Rugby AU: 2021

Queensland Country

- National Rugby Championship: 2017

University of Queensland

- Queensland Premier Rugby: 2017, 2019

Individual

- Super Rugby Pacific Team of the Year: 2026
- Queensland Reds Player of the Year (Pilecki Medal): 2026
- Queensland Reds Rookie of the Year: 2019
