= Zane Hilton =

- Born: Zane Hilton; 1981 (age 44–45)
- School: St Joseph's College, Nudgee

Rugby union career
- Position: Head coach Melbourne Rising
Coaching career
- Years: Team
- 2009–11: Brothers Old Boys
- 2012–13: Kyuden Voltex
- 2014: Canon Eagles
- 2015: Melbourne Rising

Zane Hilton (born 1981) is an Australian professional rugby union coach. He is currently an assistant coach of the Super Rugby team the Queensland Reds, having served for three seasons (2024-26) beside Head Coach Les Kiss and continuing in that role under new Head Coach Vern Cotter. Hilton was previously an assistant for three seasons (2015-17) at the Melbourne Rebels.

Hilton began his rugby coaching career as manager of the Regional College for the Queensland Reds from 2002 to 2006. He was an assistant coach at Italian club Benetton in Treviso for the 2006–07 season and at University of Queensland for 2007 and 2008. Hilton then joined Brothers for two seasons, winning the Queensland Premier Rugby competition in his first year as head coach in 2009.

He re-located to Japan in 2011 for four years, coaching at Kyuden Voltex and Canon Eagles including a season at each club as head coach. After returning home to Australia, Hilton was contracted as the forwards coach for the Melbourne Rebels in Super Rugby for the 2015 season. He was appointed as head coach of the Melbourne Rising for the 2015 National Rugby Championship.
