= Frankie Goldsbrough =

Australian rugby union player (born 2006)

- Born: 13 January 2006 (age 20) Australia
- Height: 187 cm (6 ft 2 in)
- Weight: 101 kg (223 lb; 15 st 13 lb)
- School: Anglican Church Grammar School

Rugby union career
- Position: Centre
- Current team: Reds
Senior career
Years	Team	Apps	(Points)
2025–	Reds	1	(0)
- Correct as of 9 March 2025
International career
Years	Team	Apps	(Points)
2024	Australia U20	2	(0)
- Correct as of 9 March 2025

Frankie Goldsbrough (born 13 January 2006) is an Australian rugby union player, who plays for the Reds. His preferred position is centre.

== Early career ==
Goldsbrough attended Anglican Church Grammar School where he played rugby for their first XV as well as playing rugby league. He was a member of the Queensland academy and plays his club rugby for Easts. In 2024 he was named in the Australia U20 squad.

== Professional career ==
Goldsbrough made his Queensland debut against Saitama Wild Knights in November 2024. He was named in the Reds squad for the 2025 Super Rugby Pacific season, and made his debut for the side in round 4 of the season against the Crusaders.
