= Max Craig =

Australian rugby union player

- Born: 28 August 2003 (age 23) Australia
- Height: 187 cm (6 ft 2 in)
- Weight: 102 kg (225 lb; 16 st 1 lb)
- School: Anglican Church Grammar School

Rugby union career
- Position: Hooker
- Current team: Reds
Senior career
Years	Team	Apps	(Points)
2025	Reds	1	(5)
- Correct as of 3 May 2025
International career
Years	Team	Apps	(Points)
2023	Australia U20	3	(15)
- Correct as of 3 May 2025

Max Craig (born 28 August 2003) is an Australian rugby union player, who plays for the Reds. His preferred position is hooker.

== Early career ==
Craig attended Anglican Church Grammar School where he played rugby for their first XV. He came through the Reds academy and plays his club rugby for Easts. In 2023, he represented the Australia U20 side.

== Professional career ==
Craig made his Queensland debut against Saitama Wild Knights in November 2023. He was named in the Reds squad for the 2025 Super Rugby Pacific season, and made his debut for the side in round 12 of the season against the Drua scoring a try.
