= James O'Connor (rugby union) =

Australia international rugby union player (born 1990)

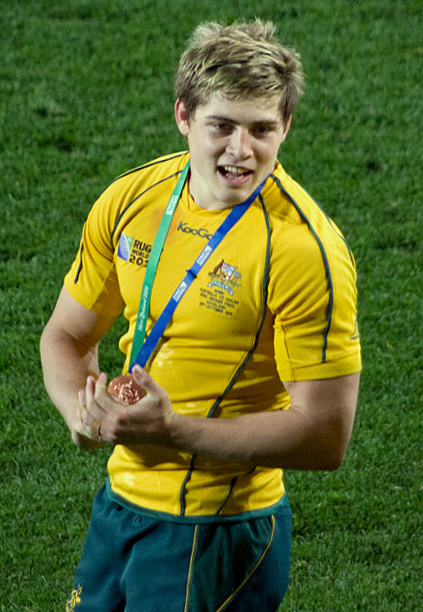
- O'Connor in 2011
- Born: James David O'Connor; 5 July 1990 (age 36) Southport, Queensland, Australia
- Height: 181 cm (5 ft 11 in)
- Weight: 93 kg (205 lb)
- School: Rutherford Primary School; St Joseph's College, Nudgee

Rugby union career
- Position(s): Fly-half, Centre, Wing, Fullback
- Current team: Force
Youth career
- –2008: Brothers
Amateur team(s)
Years	Team	Apps	(Points)
2013	West Harbour	1	(10)
2022–2026	Brothers	8	(44)
- Correct as of 1 September 2024
Senior career
Years	Team	Apps	(Points)
2008–2011	Force	39	(306)
2012–2013	Rebels	21	(201)
2013–2014	London Irish	15	(100)
2014–2017	Toulon	51	(116)
2015	Reds	13	(44)
2017–2019	Sale Sharks	32	(15)
2019–2024	Reds	57	(379)
2025	Crusaders	16	(48)
2025–2026	Leicester Tigers	13	(53)
2026–	Force	0	(0)
- Correct as of 2 September 2026
International career
Years	Team	Apps	(Points)
2007	Australia Schoolboys	2	(0)
2023	Australia A	2	(0)
2008–2025	Australia	71	(315)
- Correct as of 16 November 2025
Coaching career
- Years: Team
- 2023–2024: Anglican Church Grammar School
Medal record
Men's rugby union
Representing Australia
Rugby World Cup
Bronze medal – third place	2011 New Zealand	Squad

James David O'Connor (born 5 July 1990), often referred to his initials JOC, or nicknames "Rabs" (short for rabbit) and "Peter Pan", is an Australian professional rugby union player. Known for his versatility on the field, he has played multiple positions in the backline, including wing and fullback. However O'Connor's primary position is at fly-half or centre. He made his debut with the Perth-based Super Rugby team, the Western Force, and has since played for three other Super Rugby teams; the Melbourne Rebels, Queensland Reds & New Zealand's Crusaders. O'Connor has also played domestically with English teams London Irish, Sale Sharks, and Leicester Tigers as well as French team Toulon.

Making his international debut at 18-years-old for Australia, O'Connor has earned over sixty caps for the Wallabies, and scored more than 270 points. O'Connor has competed at two Rugby World Cups and was part of Australia's third-place finish in 2011.

== Early life ==
O'Connor was born in Australia on the Gold Coast. He lived in Auckland for five years as a child, attending Rutherford Primary School, until the age of eleven when he returned to Australia with his family. O'Connor grew up playing rugby league and earned a scholarship from the Parramatta Eels. He eventually became a boarder at Nudgee College in Brisbane's northern suburbs.

In 2006 O'Connor suffered a ruptured spleen, but went on to be part of the Australian Schools representative team that played against England, Samoa and New Zealand in 2007.

O'Connor's parents are from New Zealand, and his maternal grandparents from South Africa. This, along with his Australian birth, meant he was eligible for all three Tri Nations teams. However, his decision to play for the Wallabies, and debut in 2008, meant he became ineligible to play for the All Blacks or Springboks. He also played for the Australian Sevens in 2008.

== Career ==
O'Connor became the youngest ever Super Rugby debutant at 17-years-old, and the second youngest Wallaby in Australian rugby history at the age of 18.

=== Force and Rebels ===
O'Connor joined the Force in 2008, and came off the bench for his first Super 14 cap in a match against the Reds in Week 10 of the 2008 season. He completed the season's final three matches running on at inside centre. In 2009, O'Connor was the Western Force 'Rookie of the Year' award and also won the Wallabies 'Rookie of the Year'.

In 2012 O'Connor commenced a two-year contract with the Melbourne Rebels. His teammates included Nic Stirzaker, fullback Kurtley Beale, centre Mitch Inman, and English international Danny Cipriani. After continued ill-discipline off the field, the Rebels withdrew from contract extension negotiations at the end of the 2013 Super Rugby season and he was released by the team.

Following a number of off-field indiscretions on O'Connor's part and a drunken incident at Perth Airport, O'Connor's ARU top-up contract was torn up and was suspended from the remainder of the Test season. Following this low, O'Connor was in talks with the Western Force and the Queensland Reds, however, nothing eventuated and O'Connor was forced to move abroad.

=== Europe ===
On 28 October 2013, O'Connor indicated that he was en route to London to play rugby for "a few months". He was signed by London Irish in October 2013 until the end of the 2013–14 season. He made his debut against Northampton Saints on 3 November and set up the only try that day. He claimed his first try for the club against Worcester Warriors on 4 January 2014, in a match ending 22–9 to the Exiles with O'Connor scoring all 22 points.

=== 2015: First Reds stint ===
In 2015, he returned to Super Rugby in a bid to make the Australia squad for the 2015 Rugby World Cup. O'Connor produced solid performances and was arguably one of the higher performers for a poor Queensland outfit, being shifted between fullback, fly-half and wing in his first appearances before locking down the Red 15 jersey in the last rounds of the season.

On 13 October, the Queensland Rugby Union and Queensland Reds announced that O'Connor would be released from his contract effective immediately, meaning he would not play the 2016 Super Rugby season for the Reds and finish his two-year contract. O'Connor's release also meant the end of a potential appearance for Brisbane City in the domestic National Rugby Championship had he sufficiently recovered to play.

=== 2015–2019: Return to Europe ===
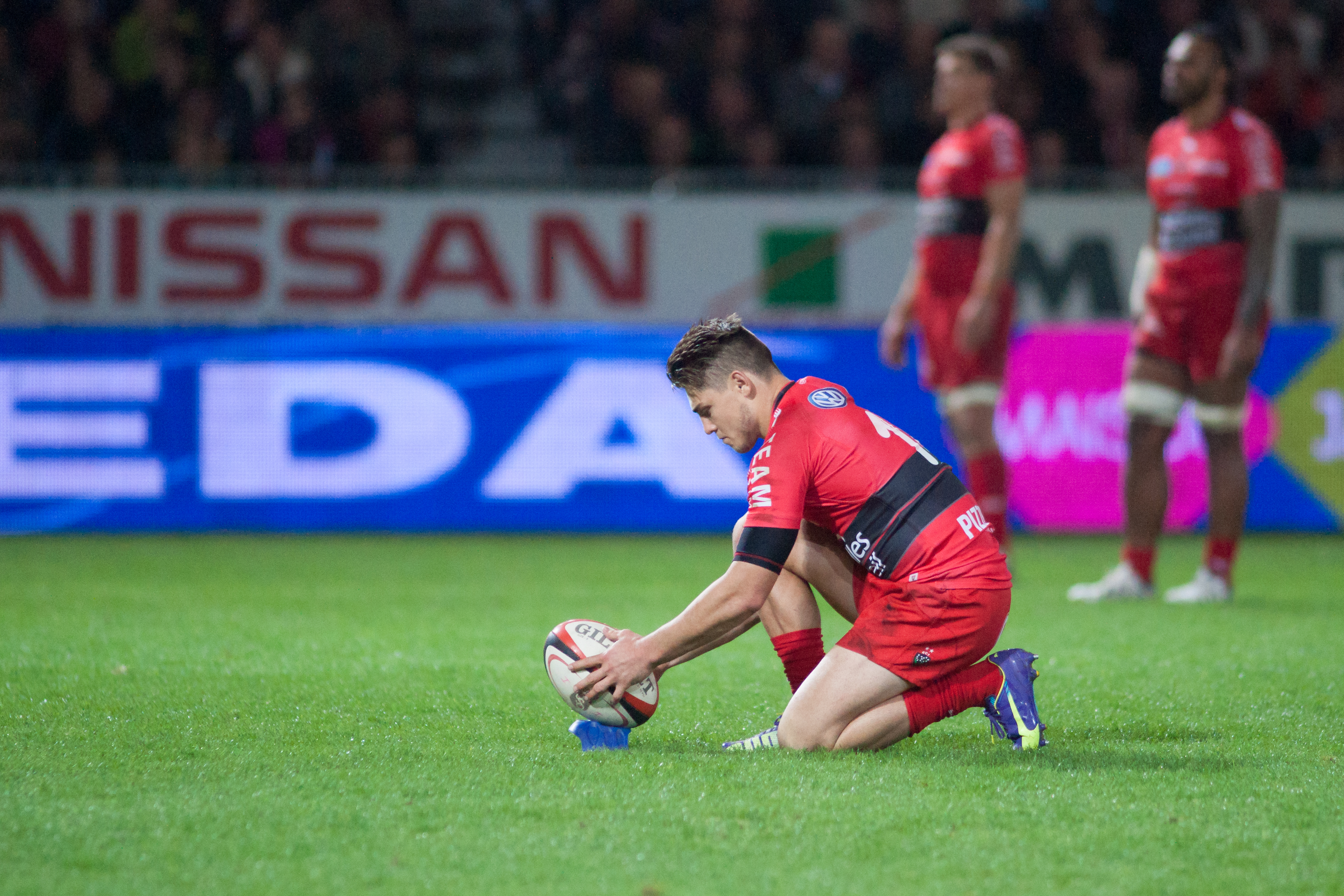
O'Connor preparing a kick for Toulon

In 2015, after failing to make the Australian 2015 Rugby World Cup squad with the Reds, O'Connor signed with Toulon in the French Top 14, joining former Super Rugby and Wallabies teammates Matt Giteau, Drew Mitchell and Quade Cooper. After allegations of cocaine use, Toulon decided not to renew his contract. O'Connor left the club at the ending of the season.

In 2017 O'Connor signed with English Premiership club Sale Sharks shortly before the 2017–18 season. After playing 31 games over two years, Sale Sharks agreed to a contract release, allowing him to pursue his ambition to play for Australia at the 2019 Rugby World Cup.

=== 2019–2024: Second Reds stint ===
In July 2019, O'Connor signed a two-year deal with the Queensland Reds and Rugby Australia under what was understood to be strict behavioural clauses.

In 2021, O'Connor was announced as captain of the Queensland Reds for the Super Rugby AU season, stepping in for the injured Liam Wright. The Reds went on to have an undefeated season under his leadership (as Wright captained their only loss), including winning the Super Rugby AU title in a home final at Suncorp Stadium. He served as co-captain with Liam Wright for the remainder of the 2021 season, including during their Super Rugby Trans-Tasman campaign. In 2022, O'Connor relinquished the captaincy, stating that he had "bitten off too much", which caused him to burn out. After making 100 Super Rugby appearances for the Reds, it was reported that O'Connor would leave Queensland for an opportunity overseas. It was later confirmed that O'Connor signed for Super Rugby side Crusaders in New Zealand for the 2025 Super Rugby Pacific season.

=== Crusaders ===
At the end of the 2024 Reds season, O'Connor, who had signed a one-year contract extension with the Reds at the end of 2023, had played an insignificant part of the season for the team. Playing just three regular season matches, all as a substitute, O'Connor rejected another contract offer. Following his release, O'Connor was heavily linked with Christchurch-based team the Crusaders in early October 2024. On 4 October 2024, it was revealed that the Crusaders had signed O'Connor for the 2025 season. Although labelled a 'shock' move in some publications, O'Connor was linked with New Zealand Super Rugby franchise, the Chiefs in 2020/21. However, this move was vetoed by Rugby Australia. O'Connor also has New Zealander-Australian parents and holds a New Zealand passport. O'Connor reportedly declined offers from clubs in France, Japan and the United States, and stated: "It seemed a no-brainer to me. Go to the Crusaders for a year – I get to experience New Zealand Super Rugby, but also the most successful franchise in Super history." At the time the Crusaders reached out to O'Connor, he was on a van-based journey across New Zealand and, by coincidence, was in Akaroa, just east of Christchurch, the Crusaders' home base.

While at the Crusaders, O'Connor had been deployed as a reserve first-five eighth behind Taha Kemara. In the first half of the season, he scored several points at the tail-end of matches, averaging 24 minutes of game time a match. O'Connor played 16 matches for the Crusaders in 2025, including the Grand Final against the Chiefs, which saw O'Connor win his second Super Rugby title.

=== Leicester Tigers ===
On 26 June 2025, it was confirmed that O'Connor would return to the United Kingdom to join English Premiership side Leicester Tigers from the 2025–26 season. He played a total of 13 games for Leicester, scoring one try and 56 points overall.

=== 2026–27: Return to the Force ===
After the conclusion of the 2025–26 Premiership season, O'Connor was reportedly in negotiations to join the Sharks franchise in Durban, South Africa ahead of the 2026–27 United Rugby Championship season. O'Connor mentioned that the opportunity to play for the Sharks "would've been unreal... My mum's parents are South African, my grandad's from Durban so that would have been a cool experience to do that." However, O'Connor turned down the deal, citing family commitments. Later in the year, O'Connor played club rugby for Brothers Old Boys in Brisbane's Hospital Cup competition.

By late July, O'Connor's next move was reported to be the Perth-based Force, the same team he made his professional debut with. On 1 September 2026, it was revealed that O'Connor had joined the Force on a one-year deal ahead of the 2027 season. In September 2026, O'Connor was named as a reserve in the Force's second round match against the Brumbies in the Super Rugby AUS.

== Player profile ==
O'Connor is a very versatile player, being able to play anywhere in the back line as a fly-half, centre, full-back or wing and is usually described as a utility back. When asked about his preferred position in 2009, he said, "I feel more comfortable at 12 as a second ball player. I also like 15. You definitely get a lot of space. I just want to get on the field whether it is 10, 12 or 15." He is also an accurate goal-kicker.

== International career ==
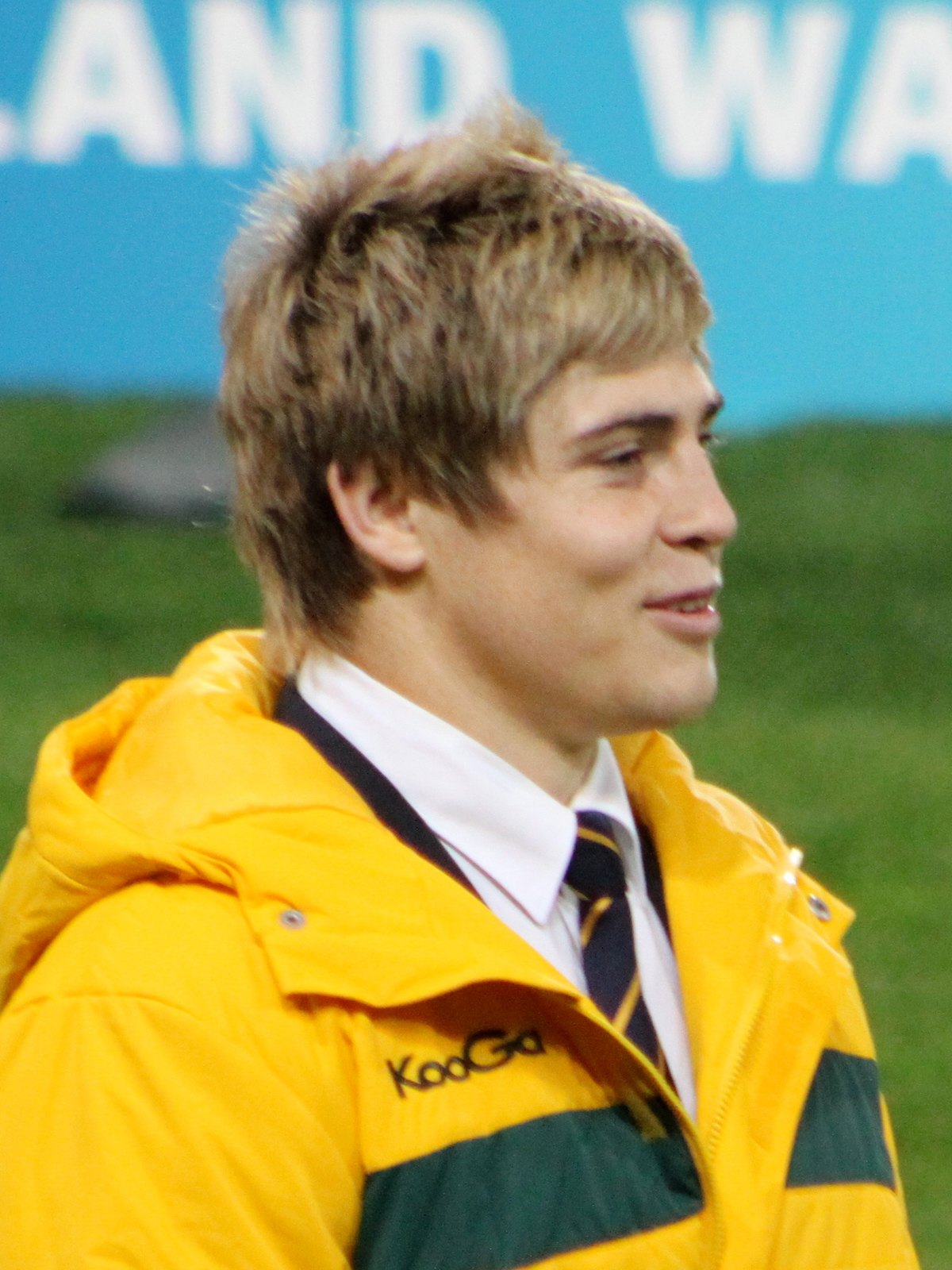
O'Connor in 2011

In September 2008, O'Connor was named in Australia's 34-man squad for their Spring Tour, which was to play in Hong Kong, Italy, England, France, and Wales. O'Connor was one of four uncapped players in the squad. O'Connor made his international Test debut for Australia, when he came off the bench as replacement fullback against Italy. O'Connor, alongside Western Force teammate Matt Giteau helped to seal the win, which had been locked up 20-all in the final 20 minutes of the match. He played Italy again in June 2009 scoring three tries to help Australia to a 31–8 win.

He played at fly-half for the Wallabies in three Tests against the Lions and was included in a five-man leadership group for the team.

Although a part of Wallabies coach Michael Cheika's squads for Wallabies logistics camps throughout the course of 2015, O'Connor was not included in the first extended 40-man camp and subsequently did not feature in any of the squads to follow, including the 2015 Rugby World Cup squad.

In 2019, after a solid Super Rugby campaign, O'Connor quickly made his way back into the Australian team for their 47–26 win over New Zealand in Perth, and was subsequently selected in Australia's World Cup squad for the 2019 Rugby World Cup in Japan.

Throughout 2019, 2020, and 2021, O'Connor had an increased presence in the Australia setup than previous years. Under coach Dave Rennie, he was frequently used as a second-playmaker, usually playing fly-half with Matt To'omua at inside centre. This style of play was notably more common, and was frequently deployed by likes of South Africa and England at the time.

In August 2025, he returned to the Australia starting side for the first time in three years ahead of the opening fixture of the 2025 Rugby Championship against South Africa after an injury to first choice fly-half Ben Donaldson. That side went on to score 38 unanswered points having been 22–0 down after 20 minutes in a 38–22 victory, with O'Connor scoring four conversions. This was also the first time Australia had won at Ellis Park since 1963.

== Career statistics ==
=== Club ===
As of 1 September 2026.

Statistics by club, season and competition
Club	Season	League							Other						Total					
Club	Season	Division	Apps	Tries	Con.	Pen.	Drop	Points	Apps	Tries	Con.	Pen.	Drop	Points	Apps	Tries	Con.	Pen.	Drop	Points
Force	2008	Super 14	4	1	0	0	0	5	—						4	1	0	0	0	5
Force	2009	Super 14	11	5	1	0	0	27	—						11	5	1	0	0	27
Force	2010	Super 14	11	1	15	23	0	104	—						11	1	15	23	0	104
Force	2011	Super Rugby	13	3	7	47	0	170	—						13	3	7	47	0	170
Force	Total		39	10	23	70	0	306	—						39	10	23	70	0	306
Rebels	2012	Super Rugby	8	2	6	21	0	85	—						8	2	6	21	0	85
Rebels	2013	Super Rugby	13	1	21	23	0	116	—						13	1	21	23	0	116
Rebels	Total		21	3	27	44	0	201	—						21	3	27	44	0	201
London Irish	2013–14	Premiership	14	1	13	23	0	100	—						14	1	13	23	0	100
Toulon	2014–15	Top 14	11	4	9	7	0	59	2 (Note: Appearances in the 2014–15 European Champions Cup.)	0	0	0	0	0	13	4	9	7	0	59
Reds	2015	Super Rugby	13	0	13	6	0	44	—						13	0	13	6	0	44
Toulon	2015–16	Top 14	14	8	0	0	0	40	3 (Note: Appearances in the 2015–16 European Champions Cup.)	0	0	3	0	9	17	8	0	3	0	49
Toulon	2016–17	Top 14	14	1	0	1	0	8	4 (Note: Appearances in the 2016–17 European Champions Cup.)	0	0	0	0	0	18	1	0	1	0	8
Toulon	Total		28	9	0	1	0	48	7	0	0	3	0	9	35	9	0	4	0	57
Sale Sharks	2017–18	Premiership	11	3	0	0	0	15	2 (Note: Appearances in the 2017–18 European Challenge Cup.)	0	0	0	0	0	13	3	0	0	0	15
Sale Sharks	2018–19	Premiership	15	0	0	0	0	0	4 (Note: Appearances in the 2018–19 European Challenge Cup and 2018–19 Premiership Cup.)	0	0	0	0	0	19	0	0	0	0	0
Sale Sharks	Total		26	3	0	0	0	15	6	0	0	0	0	0	32	3	0	0	0	15
Reds	2020	Super Rugby	6	1	0	0	0	5	—						6	1	0	0	0	5
Reds	2020	Super Rugby AU	10	2	22	15	1	102	—						10	2	22	15	1	102
Reds	2021	Super Rugby AU	9	1	25	22	0	121	—						9	1	25	22	0	121
Reds	2021	Super Rugby Trans-Tasman	3	0	9	0	0	18	—						3	0	9	0	0	18
Reds	2022	Super Rugby Pacific	10	1	20	13	0	84	—						10	1	20	13	0	84
Reds	2023	Super Rugby Pacific	13	0	12	2	0	30	—						13	0	12	2	0	30
Reds	2024	Super Rugby Pacific	3	0	2	0	0	4	—						3	0	2	0	0	4
Reds	Total		54	5	90	52	1	364	—						54	5	90	52	1	364
Crusaders	2025	Super Rugby Pacific	16	1	14	5	0	48	—						16	1	14	5	0	48
Leicester Tigers	2025–26	Premiership	10	0	12	4	0	36	4 (Note: Appearances in the 2025–26 European Champions Cup and 2025–26 Premiership Cup.)	1	6	0	0	17	14	1	18	4	0	53
Force	2027	Super Rugby Pacific	TBD																	
Career total			232	36	201	212	1	1,221	19	1	6	3	0	26	251	37	207	215	1	1,247

=== International ===
As of 1 September 2026.

Statistics by team and year
Team	Year	Statistic					
Team	Year	Apps	Tries	Con.	Pen.	Drop	Points
Australia	2008	1	0	0	0	0	0
Australia	2009	13	4	2	1	0	27
Australia	2010	13	6	16	10	0	92
Australia	2011	10	2	20	13	1	72
Australia	2013	7	2	1	1	0	15
Australia	2019	8	0	0	0	0	0
Australia	2020	3	0	1	2	0	8
Australia	2021	6	0	4	10	0	18
Australia	2022	3	0	2	1	0	7
Australia	2025	7	0	15	2	0	36
Total		71	14	61	40	1	315
Australia A	2023	2	0	0	0	0	0
Total		2	0	0	0	0	0

=== International tries ===
List of international tries scored by James O'Connor
No.	Opponent	Location	Competition	Date	Result	Ref.
1	Italy	Canberra Stadium, Canberra	2009 June Tests	13 June 2009	31–8	
2	Italy	Canberra Stadium, Canberra	2009 June Tests	13 June 2009	31–8	
3	Italy	Canberra Stadium, Canberra	2009 June Tests	13 June 2009	31–8	
4	South Africa	Lang Park, Brisbane	2009 Tri Nations Series	5 September 2009	21–6	
5	South Africa	Loftus Versfeld Stadium, Pretoria	2010 Tri Nations Series	28 August 2010	31–44	
6	South Africa	Loftus Versfeld Stadium, Pretoria	2010 Tri Nations Series	28 August 2010	31–44	
7	South Africa	Free State Stadium, Bloemfontein	2010 Tri Nations Series	4 September 2010	41–39	
8	New Zealand	Stadium Australia, Sydney	2010 Tri Nations Series	11 September 2010	22–23	
9	New Zealand	Hong Kong Stadium, Hong Kong	2010 Autumn Internationals	30 October 2010	26–24	
10	France	Stade de France, Saint-Denis	2010 Autumn Internationals	27 November 2010	59–16	
11	South Africa	Stadium Australia, Sydney	2011 Tri Nations Series	23 July 2011	39–20	
12	Italy	North Harbour Stadium, Albany (New Zealand)	2011 Rugby World Cup	11 September 2011	32–6	
13	British & Irish Lions	Stadium Australia, Sydney	2013 British & Irish Lions tour of Australia	6 July 2013	16–41	
14	New Zealand	Stadium Australia, Sydney	2013 Rugby Championship	17 August 2013	29–47	

== Off field ==
=== Controversies ===
O'Connor has been involved in a number of off-field controversies, attracting criticism from senior members of the Wallabies. In September 2013, he was stood down from the Wallabies following an incident in which he was removed from Perth airport by Australian Federal Police. As a result, O'Connor missed the final two matches of the 2013 Rugby Championship and was released from his Wallabies contract by the Australian Rugby Union. In February 2017 O'Connor was arrested together with former All Blacks player, Ali Williams, in Paris on suspicion of attempting to buy cocaine.

=== Media ===
O'Connor was a participant in the second season of reality competition series Australia's Greatest Athlete.
