= Nick Bloomfield =

Australian rugby union player (born 2004)

- Born: 10 February 2004 (age 22) Australia
- Height: 188 cm (6 ft 2 in)
- Weight: 115 kg (254 lb; 18 st 2 lb)
- School: Anglican Church Grammar School

Rugby union career
- Position: Prop
- Current team: Reds
Senior career
| Years | Team | Apps | (Points) |
| 2025– | Reds | 10 | (0) |
- Correct as of 6 June 2026
International career
| Years | Team | Apps | (Points) |
| 2023–2024 | Australia U20 | 12 | (5) |
- Correct as of 24 May 2025

Nick Bloomfield (born 10 February 2004) is an Australian rugby union player, who plays for the Reds. His preferred position is prop.

== Early career ==
Bloomfield attended Anglican Church Grammar School where he played rugby for their first XV. He came through the Reds academy and plays his club rugby for Easts. In 2023 and 2024, he represented the Australia U20 side.

== Professional career ==
Bloomfield was called into the Reds squad as a late inclusion for Round 15 of the 2025 Super Rugby Pacific season. He came on as a replacement in the fixture against the Hurricanes.
