= George Blake (rugby union) =

Australian rugby union player

- Born: 11 June 2001 (age 25) Cook Islands
- Height: 184 cm (6 ft 0 in)
- Weight: 113 kg (249 lb; 17 st 11 lb)
- School: The Southport School

Rugby union career
- Position: Prop / Hooker
- Current team: Reds
Senior career
Years	Team	Apps	(Points)
2022–	Reds	25	(15)
- Correct as of 6 June 2026

George Blake (born 11 June 2001) is a Cook Islander-Australian rugby union player, who plays for the Reds. His preferred position is prop or hooker.

== Early career ==
Blake was born in the Cook Islands. He attended The Southport School. He plays his club rugby for Bond University.

== Professional career ==
Blake was first named in the Queensland Reds squad in 2022, when he was named in the development squad. He joined the full squad for the 2023 Super Rugby Pacific season, making his debut in Round 10 against the Force, scoring a try. He would go on to make a further 3 appearances in the season, scoring another try. He was again named in the Reds squad for the 2024 Super Rugby Pacific season.
