= Cormac Daly =

Irish rugby union player

- Born: 1 May 1998 (age 28) Kilcock, Kildare, Ireland
- Height: 199 cm (6 ft 6 in)
- Weight: 120 kg (265 lb; 18 st 13 lb)

Rugby union career
- Position(s): Lock, Flanker
- Current team: Red Hurricanes Osaka
Amateur team(s)
Years	Team	Apps	(Points)
2022–2023	Randwick		
Senior career
Years	Team	Apps	(Points)
2018–2021	Connacht	0	(0)
2024	Reds	8	(0)
2024–2026	Yokohama Canon Eagles	23	(20)
2026–	Red Hurricanes Osaka	0	(0)
- Correct as of 15 May 2026
International career
Years	Team	Apps	(Points)
2018	Ireland U20	4	(0)
- Correct as of 3 March 2024

Cormac Daly (born 1 May 1998) is an Irish rugby union player, who plays for the Reds. His preferred position is lock.

== Early career ==
Daly is from Kilcock, County Kildare and played his club rugby for North Kildare and Navan. He progressed through the age groups at Leinster, before joining the Connacht academy. He represented Ireland U20 in 2018.

== Career ==
Daly spent 3 years in the Connacht academy, before joining Rugby United New York ahead of the 2020 Major League Rugby season, however the move was cancelled due to the COVID-19 pandemic. He signed a short-term deal with Connacht in late-2020, but didn't make an appearance, continuing to represent club side Clontarf. In 2023 he moved to Australia, to represent Randwick before earning a Super Rugby contract for 2024. Daly was named in the Reds squad ahead of the 2024 Super Rugby Pacific season. He made his debut in Round 1 of the season against the Waratahs.

In August 2026, Daly transferred to Red Hurricanes Osaka in the second division.
