= Queensland Reds =

Australian rugby union club, based in Brisbane

- Union: Queensland Rugby Union
- Founded: 1882; 144 years ago
- Location: Brisbane, Queensland, Australia
- Region: Queensland
- Ground: Lang Park (Capacity: 52,500)
- Coach: Vern Cotter
- Captain: TBA
- Most caps: Sean Hardman (148)
- Top scorer: Michael Lynagh (1,166)
- Most tries: Chris Latham (41)
- League: Super Rugby Pacific
- 2026: 5th overall Playoffs: Qualifying-finalist
Home kit	Away kit

Official website
- reds.rugby

The Queensland Reds are an Australian rugby union team based in Brisbane in the state of Queensland that compete in the Southern Hemisphere's Super Rugby competition. Prior to 1996, they were a representative team selected from the rugby union club competitions in Queensland. With the introduction of the professional Super 12 competition, they moved to a model where players are contracted to the Reds through the Queensland Rugby Union (QRU) rather than selected on the basis of club form.

From 1996 to 2005 they were one of three Australian teams competing in the Super 12 competition, alongside the New South Wales Waratahs and the ACT Brumbies. Queensland finished as minor premiers in 1996 and 1999. From 2006 to 2010, they competed in the expanded Super 14 competition as one of four Australian sides. Beginning in 2011, they are one of five Australian sides in the expanded and renamed Super Rugby, winning the competition in its first season in its new format (2011). In 2012 they finished first in the Australian conference and won the Super Rugby AU title in 2021, when regionalised competitions were played due to the COVID-19 pandemic.

== History ==
=== Early Queensland years ===
Refer also to Rugby union in Queensland

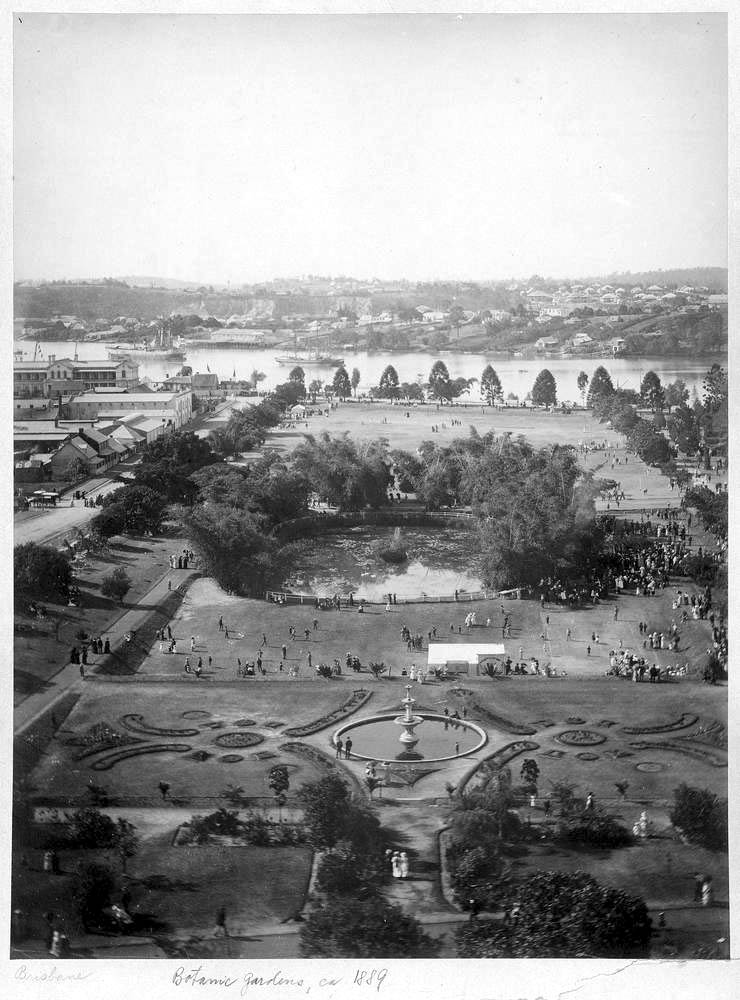
Queen's Park in the 1880s – playing field at far end

The first recorded games of rugby in Queensland were played in 1876, when the existing Brisbane Football Club (formed in 1866), switched to rugby to align with the newly formed 'Rangers' and 'Bonnet Rouge' football clubs. However, it was reported that the game was soon varied to suit the preferences of the local players, and “rugby, with Brisbane variations, was the game played” (The Brisbane Courier, 10 July 1876). Most of these games were played at the Queen's Park (now part of the City Botanic Gardens (see image at right). However, the Brisbane Courier reported in 1879 that the Brisbane FC had reverted to what had become known as the 'Victorian rules', “in place of the Rugby Union Rules played by the club during the last three seasons”.

In 1880, the club became a foundation member of the Queensland Football Association (QFA), along with Wallaroo, Excelsiors and Athenians (Ipswich), where it was decided to recognise and play mostly 'Victorian rules', with occasional games of 'Rugby' rules. However, in 1882, Brisbane FC representative (Pring Roberts) arranged a rugby tour to Sydney by a Queensland team (now Reds) against New South Wales team (now Waratahs), after the NSW Rugby Union offered to pay all costs associated with the visit..

The 17-man Queensland squad in 1882 was Wallaroo FC players A.J. Hickson (captain), Frederick Hardgrave, T. Bond, Edward Markwell, J. Townson, J.C. Boyd and H. Macintosh, Brisbane FC's Arthur Feez, Frank Baynes, Daniel Foley, Pring Roberts, Jack Burrell, H. Pritchard, H.J. Stokes, C. Tully, and Thomas Welsby, Excelsior Club's Jack Blake, and Dr. Arthur Cutfield, the Medical Superintendent at the Woogaroo Asylum.

Brisbane advocates of the Victorian rules game reacted angrily and declared that no QFA player would be permitted to play under rugby rules, which led to the formation of the Northern Rugby Union (now the Queensland Rugby Union) in late 1883.

The following years saw rapidly increasing popularity of the rugby game. As rugby historian Sean Fagan noted:

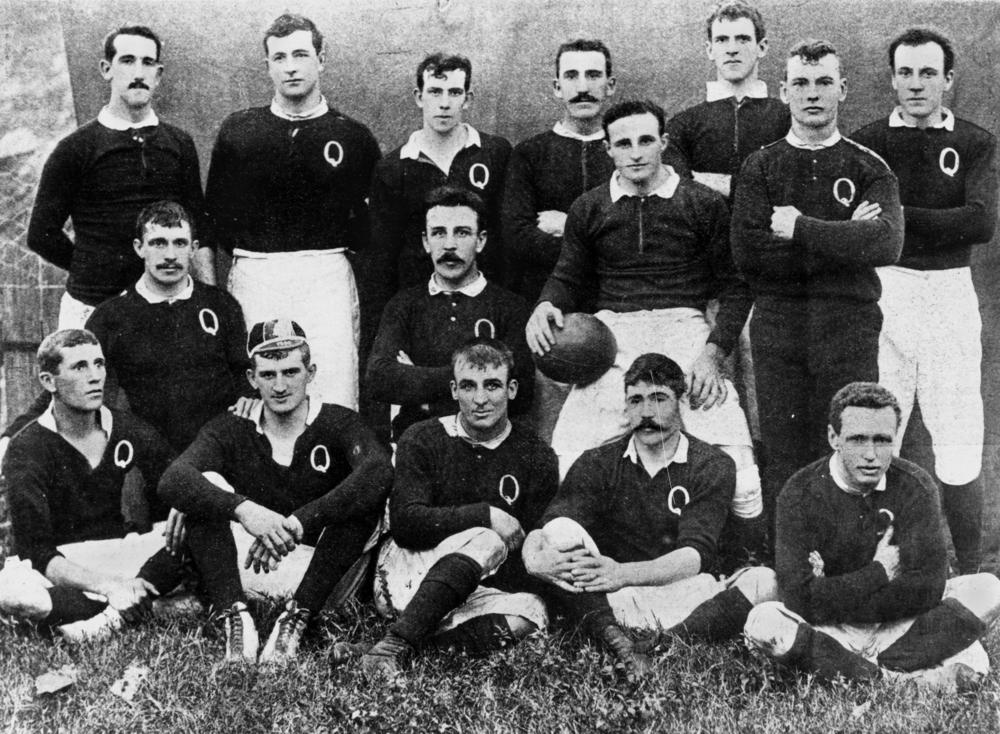
Queensland Rugby team 1899: Front row – F. Kent, S. Boland, W. Tannee, E. Currie, A. Colton. Centre – A. Gralton, C. S. Graham, R. McCowan (captain), T. Colton. Back row – W. Evans, P. Carew, T. Ward, W. H. Austin, A. Corfe, L. Dixon

The defining moment in the code battle came with the 1886 Queensland [Rugby] side, who defeated NSW for the first time in Sydney. “The success of this team undoubtedly won the day for rugby game in Queensland. The Victorian game supporters were struggling hard to uphold the premier position they had gained but after the brilliant performance of the 1886 team, who lost only one match through their tour, the rugby game became very popular and the next season several new clubs were formed and the Victorian game began to wane” (QRU Annual, 1902).

In 1883, the first inter-colonial match in Brisbane took place, with Queensland defeating New South Wales 12 to 11 at the Eagle Farm Racecourse. In 1896 the first Queensland team departed for a tour of New Zealand, where they played New Zealand at Athletic Park in Wellington on 15 August, losing 9 to nil. In 1899 Queensland recorded their first win against an international team, defeating The Lions 11 to 3 at the Exhibition Ground (see team photo at right).

The Queensland team remained a representative team selected solely from the rugby union clubs within the state, until the advent of the Super rugby competition in the 1990s.

=== Pre-Super competitions ===
With the start up of rugby league as well as World War I, Queensland rugby was dormant for a number of years, and the QRU was disbanded in 1919 and was not revived until the late 1920s. In 1928 the QRU was re-formed, and the GPS competition and major clubs soon returned. The game struggled during World War II, but growth was nonetheless apparent, with the advent of the Queensland Junior Rugby Union and the Country Rugby Union. In 1950 the QRU secured the Normanby Oval at nominal rent from Brisbane Grammar School, before they moved into Ballymore Stadium in 1966, which would serve as the spiritual home of Queensland. In 1980 Queensland defeated the All Blacks, which was their first win against New Zealand. The match was played at Ballymore on 6 July and Queensland won 9 to 3. Two seasons later centenary celebrations took place, with Queensland defeating New South Wales 41 to 7 in the celebratory match.

=== Early Super Rugby ===
The first Super 10 was held in 1993. Queensland were grouped in Pool A alongside Auckland, Natal, Western Samoa and Otago. Queensland finished with five points, in fourth place. The subsequent Super 10 competition of 1994 saw Queensland finish at the top of Pool A on 13 points, edging out North Harbour on for and against differential to finish at the top. The Queensland Reds went on to play the winner of Pool B, South African side, Natal. The Reds won the final, 21 points to 10 at Kings Park Stadium in Durban. The following season was even more successful for the Reds, who were playing in Pool B for the 1995 season. They finished the season with 16 points, four points clear of second placed team in their pool, the Free State. South African team Transvaal had finished at the top of Pool A and the final was to be decided at Ellis Park in Johannesburg. Queensland won the final 30–16, and thus became back-to-back champions.

=== Super 12 ===
With rugby union going professional, there was a reworking of competitions. The SANZAR partnership was formed between the New Zealand Rugby Football Union (NZRFU), the South African Rugby Football Union (SARFU) and the Australian Rugby Union (ARU) and the Super 12 was born. In the 1996 season Queensland finished at the top of the table.

Queensland hosted their Super 12 semi-final on 18 May 1996. The game was played at Queensland's home of rugby union, Ballymore, and was played against the Sharks. The Sharks defeated Queensland 43–25. The 1997 season saw the Reds finish in ninth place. In 1998 the Reds had a much better season, finishing in fifth position at the end of the season.

In 1999 Queensland lost only three games during the regular season, and finished at the top of the ladder on 36 points (beating the Stormers to first position due to for and against points). The Reds hosted the Canterbury Crusaders at Ballymore for a semi-final. Canterbury won 28–22. In 2000 the Reds finished in seventh place on the ladder. In 2001 the Reds finished in fourth place on the ladder and played in the semis. They played fellow Australian team, the Brumbies in Canberra, and the Brumbies won 30 points to six. The following season, 2002, the Reds finished in fifth place. For the 2003 season, Queensland finished in eighth place. Queensland finished tenth in the 2004 and 2005 Super 12 seasons.

=== Super 14 ===
In 2006, the Super 12 became the Super 14 with the addition of the Western Force (AUS) and the Cheetahs (RSA). Queensland played the Waratahs in the opening game of the season, which was a close loss. The Reds also played new team the Western Force, which Queensland won. Queensland finished 12th on the ladder. Former Wallabies coach Eddie Jones took over from Jeff Miller as coach for the 2007 season.

New coach Eddie Jones got off to a winning start at Queensland Rugby, with a Queensland XV, 63–22 victory over the NEC club. The Reds took part in the one-off Australian Provincial Championship not getting the start they wanted, losing to the Force 32–6 at home in round one but turned it around the next week beating the Waratahs 39–17 in Gosford. The following week the Reds beat the competition leaders the Brumbies 20–19 after a penalty goal by Lloyd Johansson to qualify for the final in the ACT against the same team they beat. However, Queensland lost 42–17. Later in the year Queensland beat the Cherry Blossoms 29–22 in Japan.

The 2007 Super 14 season saw the Queensland Reds finishing a poor season by winning the wooden spoon, they couldn't have started the competition any better when they beat 2006 Grand Finalists the Wellington Hurricanes in Round 1, after that win they would not taste victory again until Round 12. The season was summed up in the final round of the regular season where Queensland were defeated 92–3 by the Bulls. This defeat was by the largest margin in Super Rugby history, although the NSW Waratahs had 96 points scored against them in their loss to the Crusaders in 2002.

The 2008 Super 14 season witnessed a mini-resurgence of the Qld Reds, with the youth playing rugby under new coach Phil Mooney, they gained revenge against the Bulls after the 2007 thrashing by beating them 40–8, in what was the highlight of the season for the Reds. The Reds continued to play rugby for the rest of the season but lost close matches against the Crusaders, Blues, Chiefs and Waratahs, while the side finished 12th they showed plenty of promise while gaining some respect.

The 2010 Super 14 showed the potential of a team that had been "on the ropes" for the last 6 years. After losing their star back Berrick Barnes to the Waratahs they unearthed talent they had not known they had; that of Quade Cooper, Digby Ioane and Will Genia. They became the underdog team of the year, becoming the only team to beat both the year's finalists under the new coach, former Waratahs mentor Ewen McKenzie. The highlight of the year was their 19–12 victory over the Bulls, in which they played out a fast game to beat a skilled side. The last two games of the season were plagued by late game injuries, and ultimately cost the team a finals spot. Although the Reds missed the finals, they showed good prospects for the 2011 Super Rugby season.

=== Super Rugby ===
In the debut season of the renamed and revamped Super Rugby competition, the Queensland Reds showed their improvement from the previous few years. The Reds finished the regular season at the top of the table, with 13 wins and 3 losses. In the final, Queensland Reds achieved their first Super Rugby Championship in the professional era, beating the Crusaders (18–13) in front of a record crowd (52,113) at Suncorp Stadium, Brisbane. Following the win the Reds were handed the keys to the city after a ticker-tape parade through Brisbane.

Following the title win, though, the Reds fell down the Super Rugby ladder, finishing 13th in 2014 and 2015, and 15th in 2016 and 14th in 2017, post Super Rugby Expansion.

In 2018, former All Black Brad Thorn was appointed head coach, where he promised to turn the franchise around. Despite finishing 13th and sacking several high-profile players, the Reds had their most successful season in five years.

They repeated their 6–10 record in 2019, before making the Super Rugby AU final in 2020, during the COVID-19 pandemic, in which they lost to the Brumbies.

As the COVID-19 pandemic continued, domestic competitions continued in 2021. The Reds impressed in this, winning 7 of their 8 games, winning the final against the Brumbies, before finishing 7th in Super Rugby Trans-Tasman.

== Colours and logos ==
2007 commemorative logo

The teams' home strip traditionally was a maroon jumper with a white collar, navy shorts with maroon socks with white hoops. In more recent years the jumper has become more red in colour with the home playing strip now red jumper (no collar), red shorts and red socks. The jersey is manufactured by KooGa, and the primary shirt sponsor from 2011 St George Bank . Traditionally, the Reds Super Rugby logo as well as the traditional Q logo both appear on the jersey, however for 2007 a commemorative shield was worn instead, which incorporated the QRU's four logos over the past 100 years. The Super Rugby logo and sponsors Tooheys New appear on the sleeves. The alternative jersey is similar, except that it is predominantly white. The Reds' logo is a koala, a native Australian animal, with Reds written underneath it.

Prior to 1895 the Queensland team wore a variety of jerseys until the red/maroon colour became the Queensland jersey. In 2007, the Reds used a commemorative jersey in celebration of 125 years of Queensland rugby. This was accompanied by a new logo featuring four Queensland crests from the past. The 125-year crest featured four sectors: the Northern Rugby Union logo from 1882 (top left), the emblem from 1910 (top right), the 1935 logo (bottom left) and the current koala logo (bottom right).

=== Uniform ===
==== Kit sponsors ====
Year(s)	Kit manufacturer	Year(s)	Main shirt sponsor (Note: In 2019 Santos became a back-shirt sponsor on a four-year deal. In 2020 “TFH Hire” became a collar sponsor. For the 2021 season, digital currency company “Qoin” was a shorts sponsor. In 2021 the Queensland Reds added Alliance Airlines, “CrossBet” and “Biowin” as sponsors, on a three- and two-year deals respectively.)	Ref.
1992–2006	Canterbury	1992–2006	XXXX	—N/a
2007–2009	ISC	1997–2005	Bank of Queensland	—N/a
2010–2016	BLK (Note: Known as KooGa until 2011.)	2006–2009	Queensland Rail	
2017–2018	Zoo	2010–2021	St. George	
2019–2022	Dynasty	2022–2023	Westpac (Note: St. George, a subsidiary of Westpac, was dropped as a main shirt sponsor and became a sleeve sponsor for 2022.)	
2023–	Canterbury	2022–2023	Westpac	
2023–	Canterbury	2024–	BMS Group	

== Grounds ==
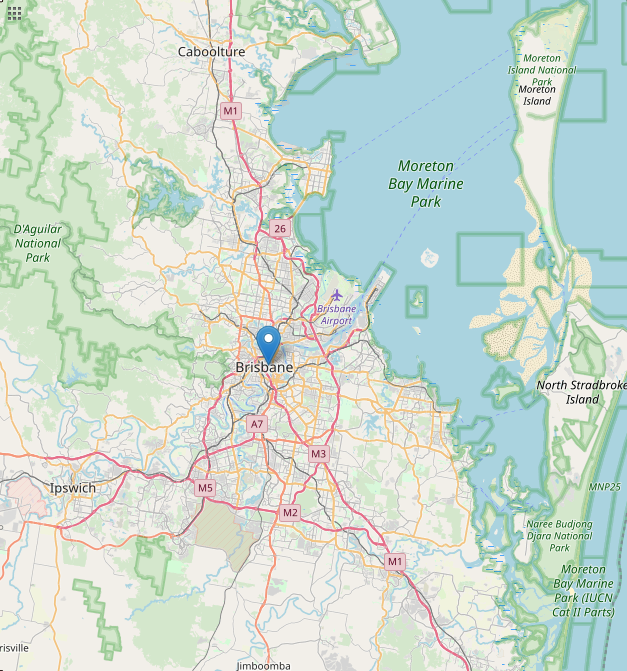
Queensland Reds' various home venues
Queensland stadium locations

Due to historical and practical reasons, the team represents the entire state of Queensland. However the team has been based entirely in the South East Queensland region since its foundation. The team has played matches at numerous venues, including Queen's Park, the Eagle Farm Racecourse, the Brisbane Showgrounds, Ballymore Stadium and its current home Lang Park. The traditional home of Queensland Rugby is Ballymore, which was built in the late 1960s in Herston. Throughout the Super 12, the Reds played their home matches at that stadium.

With the expansion of Super 12 to 14 for the 2006 season, the Reds moved to the 52,500-seat Suncorp Stadium; which has been described as an investment in the future of the Queensland Rugby, with easier access and world class facilities.

The Reds have also played numerous pre-season games at the Gold Coast, Sunshine Coast, and Darling Downs regions, in order to raise the team's profile outside of Brisbane.

In 2006 and 2021, the Reds travelled to Townsville to play a regular season game, both times attracting almost 20,000.

Herston (Brisbane)	Bowen Hills (Brisbane)	Milton (Brisbane)	Townsville
Ballymore Stadium	Brisbane Showgrounds	Lang Park	North Queensland Stadium
Capacity: 8,000	Capacity: 25,490	Capacity: 52,500	Capacity: 25,455

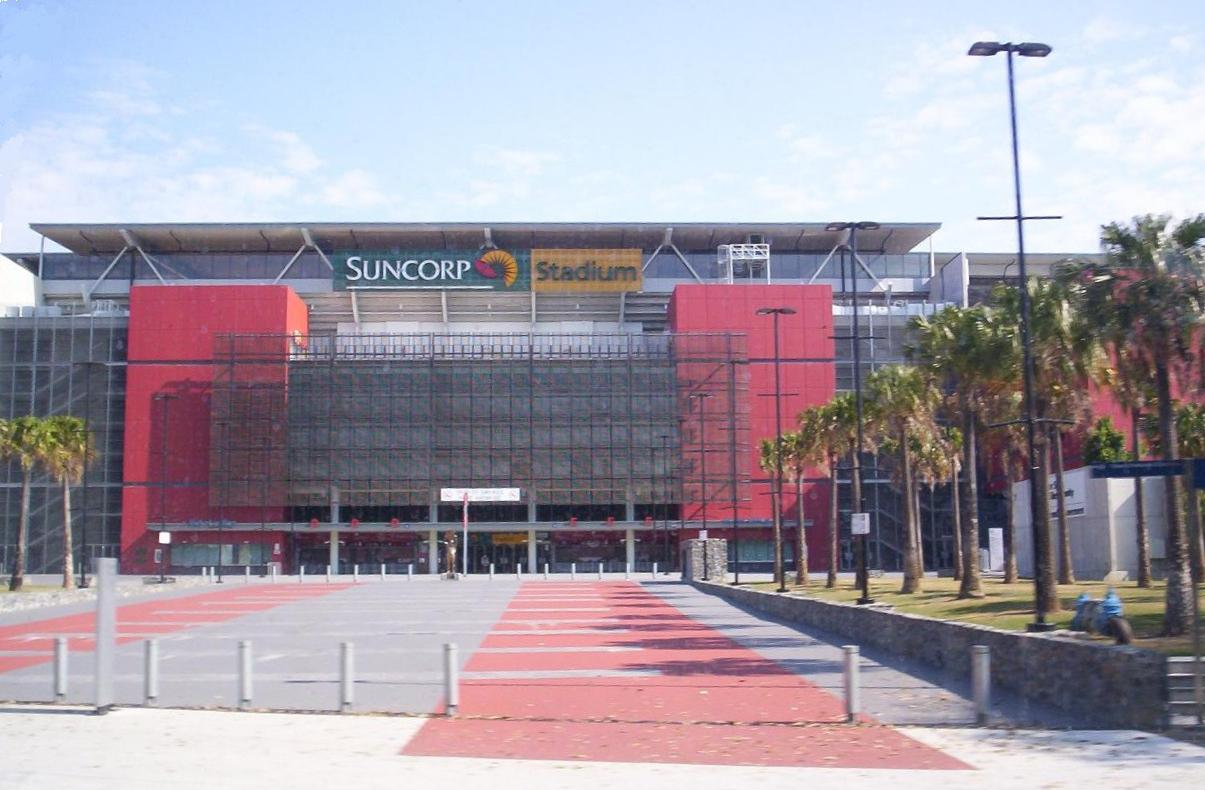
Suncorp Stadium

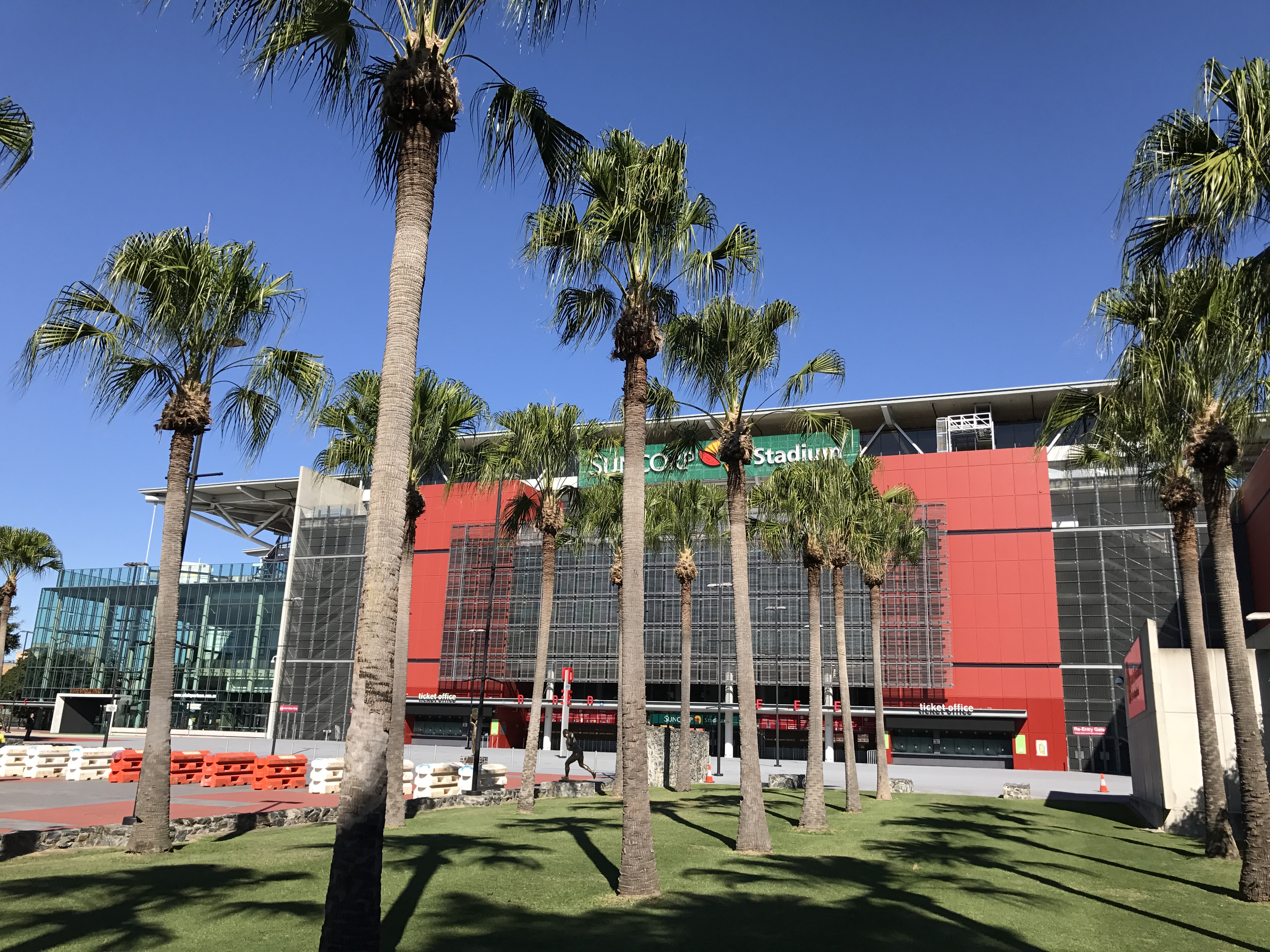
The home of the Reds also known as Lang Park

== Anthem/Chants ==
In January 2007, the Queensland Reds released a team anthem to be sung by the crowd during matches and after wins. The song was sung in the Queen Street Mall by members of the team including John Roe, Ben Tune, Peter Hynes and Berrick Barnes. The Reds also launched new marketing campaigns for 2007 (e.g. "Join the Revolution"/"The Red Army Needs You"); and the fans have since been referred to as "The Red Army". Major sponsor St George Bank sponsor a cheer squad at some games known as the St George Fan Bank.

At home games, the chant “We are Red” is commonplace as the home crowd get behind their team.

‘Take Me Home, Country Roads’ by John Denver is sung at the conclusion of wins, an anthem of sorts.

== Fans ==
The Reds have one of the largest and die-hard followings in Brisbane, averaging 19,118 at their 2021 home games and filling Suncorp Stadium for their 6 semi-final and two Grand Final appearances, including the 2021 Harvey Norman Super Rugby AU Final against the ACT Brumbies.

Queensland Rugby CEO David Hanham claimed the fan base was growing once more after half a decade of on-field struggles, with the organisation passing 15 000 members in 2023 for the first time since 2018. He also pointed out how the organisation has the potential to be the largest sports union in Queensland.

== Rivalries ==
Queensland's most popular rivalries are against the other Australian teams in Super Rugby (Brumbies, Western Force, Waratahs and Melbourne Rebels). The most famous of these rivalries is the interstate clash between the Queensland Reds and the New South Wales Waratahs. The match between these two sides usually draws the largest crowd for the Reds when they are hosting the match, which is sometimes (such as in 2006), used as the first game of the season. The Bob Templeton Cup is a trophy awarded to the winner of the Queensland/New South Wales match.

Former Queensland captain John Eales, prior to the Queensland and New South Wales clash in 2001, quoted former Wallaby Mark Loane to sum up matches against New South Wales, "the most hard fought fights are fighting with your brother in the backyard". There have been over 270 matches between the two teams, with New South Wales well in the lead with over 170 wins, and Queensland over 80, with 12 drawn. Since the start of professional Super rugby in 1996, 17 matches have been played, Queensland winning nine, New South Wales seven, and one being drawn.

== Development teams ==
The QRU formerly owned and managed two National Rugby Championship teams, Brisbane City and Queensland Country. These NRC teams drew on a range of players ranging from full-time professionals to those on incentive contracts. These teams were closely aligned with the Reds and train at Ballymore, the QRU's training base used by the Reds. The NRC is now defunct but is set to return in the near future.

Brisbane City and Queensland Country also field Under 19, 18, and 16 teams.

=== Queensland Reds A ===
The Queensland A team plays matches against interstate and international representative teams, and has also competed in tournaments such as the Pacific Rugby Cup. Known by various names over the years including Queensland A, Reds A, Reds College XV, and Reds Academy, the team is selected from the best emerging rugby talent in Queensland. The squad is a mix of Reds contracted players, extended training squad members, Queensland Under 19s, and selected Premier Rugby club players.

=== Under 19 ===
Two Queensland teams, Brisbane City U19 and Queensland Country U19, play in the national URC competition. Prior to 2008, state colts teams at under 21 and under 19 age levels were fielded in national tournaments and in the Trans-Tasman Trophy, but these teams were consolidated as under 20s ahead of the inaugural World Rugby U20 Championship. In 2018, an under 19 age limit was reinstated for the national colts team competition.

== Members ==
Season	Average attendance	Members
2011	33,254	15,626
2012	34,217	32,640
2013	31,848	36,014
2014	28,190	
2015	20,199	
2016	21,780	
2017	15,115	
2018	12,101	
2019	11,352	
2020	10,819†	
2020 AU	8,028	
2021 AU	19,118	

†Only three home matches due to COVID-19 pandemic.

== Records and achievements ==
=== Season by season record ===
Competition	Season	Queensland Reds seasons											Top try scorer		Top point scorer	
Competition	Season	Pos	Finals	P	W	L	D	F	A	Diff.	BP	Pts	Name	Tries	Name	Points
South Pacific Championship	1986	2nd	—N/a	5	3	2	0	75	77	−2	1	13	—N/a			
South Pacific Championship	1987	3rd	—N/a	5	3	2	0	129	96	+33	1	13	—N/a			
South Pacific Championship	1988	6th	—N/a	5	1	4	0	84	140	−56	1	5	—N/a			
South Pacific Championship	1989	3rd	—N/a	5	3	2	0	119	78	+41	0	12	—N/a			
South Pacific Championship	1990	2nd	—N/a	5	4	1	0	135	68	+67	0	16	—N/a			
Super 6	1992	1st	—N/a	5	5	0	0	128	58	+62	0	20	—N/a			
Super 10	1993	4th	—N/a	4	1	3	0	75	89	−14	1	5	—N/a			
Super 10	1994	1st	Winners	4	3	1	0	114	64	+50	1	13	—N/a			
Super 10	1995	1st	Winners	4	4	4	0	146	64	+82	0	16	—N/a			
Super 12	1996	1st	Semi-finals	11	9	2	0	320	247	+73	5	41	Ben Tune	8	John Eales	155
Super 12	1997	10th	—N/a	11	4	7	0	263	318	−55	4	20	Jason Little	5	John Eales	120
Super 12	1998	5th	—N/a	11	6	4	1	273	229	+44	5	31	Tim Horan	6	John Eales	109
Super 12	1999	1st	Semi-finals	11	8	2	1	233	170	+63	2	36	Daniel Herbert	5	Nathan Spooner	150
Super 12	2000	7th	—N/a	11	6	5	0	317	305	+12	6	30	Chris Latham	7	Shane Drahm	91
Super 12	2001	4th	Semi-finals	11	6	5	0	300	277	+33	8	32	Chris Latham	7	Elton Flatley	112
Super 12	2002	5th	—N/a	11	7	4	0	336	287	+49	6	34	Chris Latham	10	Elton Flatley	148
Super 12	2003	8th	—N/a	11	5	6	0	281	318	−37	6	26	Wendell Sailor	4	Elton Flatley	125
Super 12	2004	10th	—N/a	11	5	6	0	217	246	−29	5	25	Chris Latham	4	Elton Flatley	65
Super 12	2005	10th	—N/a	11	3	8	0	185	282	−97	5	17	Drew Mitchell	4	Julian Huxley	54
Super 14	2006	12th	—N/a	13	4	9	0	240	320	−80	6	22	Berrick Barnes	3	Julian Huxley	52
Super 14	2007	14th	—N/a	13	2	11	0	201	438	−237	3	11	John Roe	2	Clinton Schifcofske	98
Super 14	2008	12th	—N/a	13	3	9	1	258	323	−65	4	18	John Roe	5	Clinton Schifcofske	96
Super 14	2009	13th	—N/a	13	3	10	0	258	380	−122	7	19	Digby Ioane	5	Berrick Barnes	50
Super 14	2010	5th	—N/a	13	8	5	0	366	308	+58	7	39	Quade Cooper	5	Quade Cooper	171
Super Rugby	2011	1st	Winners	16	13	3	0	429	309	+120	6	66	Scott Higginbotham	6	Quade Cooper	228
Super Rugby	2012	3rd	Qualifying final	16	11	5	0	359	347	+12	6	58	Dom Shipperley	8	Mike Harris	149
Super Rugby	2013	5th	Qualifying final	16	10	4	2	321	296	+25	6	58	Rod Davies	5	Quade Cooper	172
Super Rugby	2014	13th	—N/a	16	5	11	0	374	493	−119	8	28	Lachlan Turner	4	Quade Cooper	120
Super Rugby	2015	13th	—N/a	16	4	12	0	247	434	−187	6	22	Samu Kerevi (Note: Born in Fiji, Samu Kerevi represented the Fiji under-20 rugby union team in 2012. He made his debut for Australia in June 2016, between rounds fourteen and fifteen of the Super Rugby.)	6	James O'Connor	44
Super Rugby	2016	15th	—N/a	15	3	11	1	290	458	−168	3	17	Samu Kerevi	5	Jake McIntyre	85
Super Rugby	2017	14th	—N/a	15	4	11	0	321	479	−158	5	21	Eto Nabuli (Note: Nabuli, whom was born in Fiji and represented the Fiji rugby league team in 2014 and 2015, made his debut for Australia in June 2017, during the end-part of the Super Rugby season.)	8	Quade Cooper	74
Super Rugby	2018	13th	—N/a	16	6	10	0	389	501	−112	4	28	Filipo Daugunu (Note: Daugunu was born and raised in Fiji and had represented Fiji U20 at youth level. He did not represent Australia until October 2020, 22 days after the 2020 Super Rugby AU season had finished.)	6	Jono Lance	101
Super Rugby	2019	14th	—N/a	16	6	10	0	385	438	−53	4	28	Bryce Hegarty	7	Bryce Hegarty	156
Super Rugby	2020 (Note: The 2020 season was cancelled after seven rounds due to COVID-19. The Queensland Reds had played seven matches, and held a record of two wins and five losses. This put them third in the Australian conference and tenth overall, having accrued thirteen points.)	N/A	Cancelled										Tate McDermott	5	Bryce Hegarty	38
Super Rugby AU	2020	2nd	Runners-up	10	6	2	2	263	191	+72	3	28	Filipo Daugunu	6	James O'Connor	102
Super Rugby AU	2021	1st	Winners	9	8	1	0	290	186	+104	5	33	Alex Mafi	6	James O'Connor	121
Super Rugby Trans-Tasman	2021	7th	—N/a	5	1	4	0	125	211	−86	1	5	Suliasi Vunivalu (Note: Vunivalu was born in Fiji and represented the Fiji rugby league team between 2017 and 2019. He made his debut for Australia in July 2022.)	4	James O'Connor	18
Super Rugby Pacific	2022	7th	Quarter-finals	15	8	7	0	357	364	–7	3	35	Jock Campbell	8	James O'Connor	87
Super Rugby Pacific	2023	8th	Quarter-finals	15	5	10	0	411	480	–69	4	24	Josh Flook	7	Tom Lynagh	54
Super Rugby Pacific	2024	5th	Quarter-finals	15	8	7	0	465	383	+82	8	40	Tim Ryan	9	Tom Lynagh	56
Super Rugby Pacific	2025	5th	Qualifying final	15	8	7	0	437	403	+34	6	38	Lachie Anderson	8	Tom Lynagh	104
Super Rugby Pacific	2026	5th	Qualifying final	14	8	6	0	364	386	−22	5	37	Tim Ryan	8	Carter Gordon	45

== Players ==
=== Current squad ===
The Queensland Reds squad for the 2027 Super Rugby Pacific season is:

2027 Queensland Reds squad
**Props**: (Cook Islands) George Blake *; (Australia) Nick Bloomfield; (Australia) **Massimo de Lutiis**; (Australia) Trevor King; (Australia) Tom Lambert; (Australia) **Zane Nonggorr**; (Australia) **Aidan Ross**; (Australia) Kingsley Uys; **Hookers**: (Australia) Zach Hough; (Australia) **Matt Faessler**; (Australia) **Josh Nasser**; **Locks**: (Australia) Charlie Brosnan; (Australia) **Josh Canham**; (Australia) **Cadeyrn Neville**; (Australia) **Lukhan Salakaia-Loto**; (Australia) Will Ross	**Loose forwards**: (Australia) Joe Brial; (Australia) Toby Brial; (Australia) John Bryant; (Australia) Lachlan Hooper; (Australia) Vaiuta Latu; (Australia) **Fraser McReight**; (Australia) Tom Robinson; (Australia) **Harry Wilson**; **Scrum-halves**: (Australia) James Martens; (Australia) **Tate McDermott**; (Australia) **Kalani Thomas**; **Fly-halves**: (Australia) **Carter Gordon**; (Australia) **Tom Lynagh**; (Australia) Finn Mackay; (New Zealand) Coby Miln	**Centres**: (Australia) **Isaac Henry**; (Australia) Dre Pakeho; (Australia) **Izaia Perese**; (Australia) Xavier Rubens; (Australia) Taione Taka; **Outside backs**: (Australia) Lachie Anderson; (Australia) Nicholas Conway; (Australia) **Filipo Daugunu**; (Australia) Treyvon Pritchard; (Australia) Tim Ryan
**Bold** denotes internationally capped players. * denotes players qualified to play for Australia on residency or dual nationality. Source:

=== Super Rugby AUS ===
The squad for the 2026 Super Rugby AUS competition is:

2026 Queensland Reds Super Rugby AUS squad
**Props**: (Cook Islands) George Blake *; (Australia) Nick Bloomfield; (Australia) Trevor King; (Australia) **Zane Nonggorr**; (Australia) Harrison Usher; **Hookers**: (Australia) **Matt Faessler**; (Australia) John Grenfell; (Australia) Zach Hough; **Locks**: (Australia) Charlie Brosnan; (Australia) Kenny Harris; (Australia) Will Ross; (Australia) Dom Thygesen	**Loose forwards**: (Australia) Joe Brial; (Australia) John Bryant; (Australia) Teina Graham; (Australia) Jake Kurbatoff; (Australia) Vaiuta Latu; (Australia) Tom Robinson; **Scrum-halves**: (Australia) Mosiah Christian; (Australia) Flynn McDermott; (Australia) Cooper Stewart; **Fly-halves**: (Australia) **Tom Lynagh**; (Fiji) **Ben Volavola**	**Centres**: (Australia) **Josh Flook**; (New Zealand) David Fusitu'a (Note: Fusitu'a wasn't named in the original Super Rugby AUS squad, but was announced in the side for Round 2.); (Australia) Heath Lindenmayer; (Australia) Jake Pappin; (Australia) **Izaia Perese**; (Australia) Josh Takai; **Outside backs**: (Australia) Lachie Anderson **(c)**; (Australia) **Jock Campbell** (Note: Campbell wasn't named in the original Super Rugby AUS squad, but was announced in the side for Round 1.); (Australia) Alex Flanagan Smith; (Australia) Will McCulloch; (Australia) **Sefa Naivalu** (Note: Naivalu wasn't named in the original Super Rugby AUS squad, but was announced in the side for Round 2.); (Australia) Tim Ryan
**(c)** denotes the team captain. **Bold** denotes internationally capped players. * denotes players qualified to play for Australia on residency or dual nationality. Source:

=== Captains ===
- Tim Horan

(1996–1997)
- David Wilson

(1998–1999)
- John Eales

(2000–2001)
- Daniel Herbert

(2002)
- Toutai Kefu

(2003)
- Elton Flatley

(2004–2005)
- John Roe

(2006–2008)
- Sam Cordingley

(2008)
- James Horwill

(2008–2014)
- James Slipper

(2015–2017)
- Scott Higginbotham

(2018)
- Samu Kerevi

(2019)
- Liam Wright

(2020–2025)

Co-Captain with James O'Connor in 2021, Co-Captain with Tate McDermott from 2022 to 2025.
- James O'Connor

(2021)

Replaced injured Liam Wright, later Co-Captain with Liam Wright.
- Tate McDermott

(2022–2025)

Co-Captain with Liam Wright.
- Fraser McReight

(2026-)

== Awards ==
=== Player Award Winner ===
Pilecki Medal (Players' Player) is the award given to the Queensland Reds player of the year for that season. The medal is named after stalwart Queensland prop Stan Pilecki, the first player to represent Queensland in 100 matches.

- 1992 – Peter Slattery
- 1993 – Rod McCall
- 1994 – Matthew Pini
- 1995 – Jason Little
- 1996 – Jason Little (2)
- 1997 – John Eales
- 1998 – John Eales (2)
- 1999 – Chris Latham, Daniel Herbert
- 2000 – Chris Latham (2)
- 2001 – Toutai Kefu
- 2002 – Chris Latham (3)
- 2003 – Julian Huxley
- 2004 – Chris Latham (4)
- 2005 – Nathan Sharpe
- 2006 – Rodney Blake
- 2007 – David Croft
- 2008 – David Croft (2)
- 2009 – Digby Ioane
- 2010 – Will Genia
- 2011 – Will Genia (2)
- 2012 – James Slipper
- 2013 – Jake Schatz
- 2014 – James Slipper (2)
- 2015 – Liam Gill
- 2016 – Liam Gill (2)
- 2017 – George Smith
- 2018 – Samu Kerevi
- 2019 – Samu Kerevi (2)
- 2020 – Taniela Tupou
- 2021 – Taniela Tupou (2)
- 2022 – Harry Wilson
- 2023 – Harry Wilson (2)
- 2024 – Fraser McReight
- 2025 – Filipo Daugunu
- 2026 – Jock Campbell

=== Rookie of the Year ===
- 1999 – Nathan Sharpe
- 2001 – David Croft
- 2004 – Drew Mitchell
- 2006 – Anthony Mathison
- 2009 – Laurie Weeks
- 2010 – Jake Schatz
- 2018 – Jordan Petaia
- 2019 – Jock Campbell
- 2020 – Harry Wilson
- 2021 – Ryan Smith
- 2022 – Lawson Creighton
- 2023 – Tom Lynagh
- 2024 – Tim Ryan
- 2025 – Dre Pakeho
- 2026 – Vaiuta Latu & Treyvon Pritchard

=== Australian Super Rugby Player Award Winner ===
- 1998 – John Eales
- 2000 – Chris Latham
- 2003 – Chris Latham (2)
- 2004 – Chris Latham (3)
- 2005 – Chris Latham (4)
- 2010 – Quade Cooper
- 2011 – Will Genia
- 2012 – Will Genia (2)
- 2018 – Taniela Tupou
- 2019 – Samu Kerevi
- 2020 – Taniela Tupou (2)
- 2021 – James O'Connor
- 2023 – Fraser McReight
- 2024 – Fraser McReight (2)
- 2026 – Jock Campbell

=== Australian Super Rugby Coach Award Winner ===
- 1998 – John Connolly
- 1999 – John Connolly (2)
- 2011 – Ewen McKenzie
- 2021 – Brad Thorn

=== Australian Super Rugby Try of the Year ===
- 1998 – Dan Herbert
- 2001 – Nathan Spooner
- 2009 – Quade Cooper
- 2010 – Quade Cooper (2)
- 2013 – Rod Davies

== Notable players ==
Players with 100 or more caps.

- Mark Connors
- Quade Cooper
- David Croft
- Dan Crowley
- John Eales
- Elton Flatley
- Michael Foley
- Will Genia
- Peter Grigg
- Sean Hardman
- Daniel Herbert
- Scott Higginbotham
- Tim Horan
- James Horwill
- Greg Holmes
- Toutai Kefu
- Chris Latham
- Jason Little
- Michael Lynagh
- Rod McCall
- Paul McLean
- Brendan Moon
- Stan Pilecki
- John Roe
- Rob Simmons
- James Slipper
- Tony Shaw
- Andrew Slack
- Peter Slattery
- Damian Smith (rugby union)
- Ben Tune
- David Wilson
- Tate McDermott
- Jock Campbell
- Fraser McReight

== Personnel ==
=== Coaches ===
==== Amateur Era ====
- (Australia) John Connolly (1989–1996*)

Coach of the Reds for South Pacific Championship, Super 6 and Super 10.

==== Professional Era ====
Reds Super Rugby Coaches
Coach	Tenure	Games	Wins	Losses	Draws	Win %	Finals Appearances	Titles
(Australia) John Connolly	1996–2000*	57	33	22	2	58%	1996, 1999	None
(Australia) Mark McBain	2001–2002	23	13	10	0	56%	2001	None
(Australia) Andrew Slack	2002 – 2003	22	12	10	0	54%	None	None
(Australia) Jeff Miller	2004–2006	35	12	23	0	34%	None	None
(Australia) Eddie Jones	2007	13	2	11	0	15%	None	None
(Australia) Phil Mooney	2008–2009	26	6	19	1	23%	None	None
(Australia) Ewen McKenzie	2010–2013	65	44	19	2	68%	2011, 2012, 2013	2011
(Australia) Richard Graham	2014–2016	34	9	25	0	26%	None	None
(Australia) Matt O'Connor & (Australia) Nick Stiles (co-interim)	2016	13	3	9	1	23%	None	None
(Australia) Nick Stiles	2016–2017	15	4	11	0	27%	None	None
(New Zealand) Brad Thorn	2017–2023	90	40	49	1	44%	2020, 2021, 2022, 2023	2021 AU
(Australia) Les Kiss**	2024–	17	10	7	0	59%	2024	None

As of 4 November 2024. *continued role from Amateur Era. **denotes record includes Super Rugby Pacific record and capped pre-season/post-season tour games.

== Honours ==
=== Professional era ===
- Super Rugby (1996–):
  - Champions (1): 2011
  - Playoff appearances (10): 1996, 1999, 2001, 2012, 2013, 2022, 2023, 2024, 2025, 2026
- Super Rugby AU (2020–2021):
  - Champions (1): 2021
  - Runners-up (1): 2020
- Australian Provincial Championship (APC):
  - Runners-up (1): 2006
- Ricoh National Championship:
  - Champions (1): 2000

=== Amateur era ===
- Super 10:
  - Champions (2): 1994, 1995
- Super 6:
  - Champions (1): 1992

== Records and statistics ==
- Highest point scorer in a career – Michael Lynagh (1,145 points, 1982–1994)
- Highest point scorer in a season – Quade Cooper (228 points, 2011)
- Highest try scorer in a career – Brendan Moon (69 tries, 1978–1987)
- Highest try scorer in a season – Brendan Moon (16 tries, 1978)
- Highest appearance – Sean Hardman (148, 1999–2010)
- Highest captain – James Horwill (69, 2006–2015)
- Largest victory – Victoria 76–0 (1978)
- Largest defeat – Bulls 3–92 (2007)

== See also ==
- Brisbane City
- Queensland Country
- Queensland Premier Rugby

== Notes ==
Preceded by (South Africa) Bulls	Super Rugby Champions; 2011 (First title)	Succeeded by (New Zealand) Chiefs
