= 2023 New South Wales Waratahs season =

New South Wales Waratahs
- 2023 season
- Coach: Darren Coleman
- Chairman: Tony Crawford
- Super Rugby: TBD
- Super Super Finals: TBD
- Top try scorer: All: Max Jorgensen (4 tries); Mark Nawaqanitawase (4 tries)
- Top points scorer: All: Tane Edmed (40 points); Ben Donaldson (40 points)
| Home colours | Away colours |

== Coaching and squad ==
| Position | Name |
|---|---|
| Head coach | Darren Coleman |
| Assistant coach | Jason Gilmore |
| Assistant coach | Chris Whitaker |
| Assistant coach | Pauli Taumoepeau |

The squad for the 2023 Super Rugby Pacific season is:

NSW Waratahs Super Rugby squad
| **Props**: (Australia) **Angus Bell**; (Australia) **Tetera Faulkner**; (Australia) Archer Holz; (Australia) **Harry Johnson-Holmes**; (Australia) Tom Lambert; (New Zealand) Tiaan Tauakipulu; (Australia) Daniel Botha^{ST} (Note: Botha wasn't named in the initial squad, however was announced as a squad player before the second round of the season.); **Hookers**: (Australia) **Tolu Latu**; (Australia) **Dave Porecki**; (Tonga) Mahe Vailanu; **Locks**: (Australia) **Jed Holloway**; (Australia) Zane Marolt; (Samoa) **Taleni Seu**; (Australia) Hugh Sinclair; (Australia) Zac von Appen | **Loose forwards**: (New Zealand) Charlie Gamble; (Australia) **Langi Gleeson**; (Australia) **Ned Hanigan**; (Australia) Will Harris; (Australia) **Michael Hooper**; (Australia) **Lachlan Swinton**; **Scrum-halves**: (Australia) Harrison Goddard; (Australia) **Jake Gordon** (c); (Australia) Teddy Wilson; **Fly-halves**: (Australia) Jack Bowen; (Australia) **Ben Donaldson**; (Australia) Tane Edmed | **Centres**: (Australia) **Lalakai Foketi**; (Australia) **Izaia Perese**; (Australia) Mosese Tuipulotu; (Australia) Joey Walton; **Wingers**: (Australia) Ben Dowling; (Fiji) **Nemani Nadolo**; (Australia) **Mark Nawaqanitawase**; (Australia) Dylan Pietsch; (Australia) Harry Wilson; **Fullbacks**: (Australia) **Kurtley Beale** (Note: Named in the initial squad, Beale was suspended from the team in January 2023 (before the start of the season) by Rugby Australia following Beale's illegal activities. Rugby Australia stated that Beale would remain stood down "pending the conclusion of legal proceedings, as well as Rugby Australia's own investigations," adding: "This step follows Mr Beale's arrest and subsequent charge with serious criminal offences, and is in line with Rugby Australia's Professional Player Code of Conduct."); (Australia) Will Harrison; (Australia) Max Jorgensen |
(c) Denotes team captain, **Bold** denotes internationally capped, ^{DEV} denotes a development squad player, ^{ST} denotes a short-term signing, denotes a player ruled out for the season with injury.

== Season fixture ==
| Round | 1 | 2 | 3 | 4 | 5 | 6 | 7 | 8 | 9 | 10 | 11 | 12 | 13 | 14 | 15 |
|---|---|---|---|---|---|---|---|---|---|---|---|---|---|---|---|
| Ground | H | A | A | A | H | A | — | H | A | H | A | H | H | A | H |
| Result | L | W | L | L | L | L | | W | L | W | W | W | W | | |
| Position | 8 | 5 | 7 | 9 | 11 | 11 | | 9 | 10 | 7 | 6 | 6 | 6 | | |

Source: Super Rugby
A = Away; H = Home; W = Win; D = Draw; L = Loss
Notes: Positions show the situation at the end of the corresponding Game Round (GR); not the position at the conclusion of matches or game days

2023 Super Rugby season
| Round | Date | Venue | Team | Home | Away | Result (Margin) | Pos. | Ref. |
| Round | Date | Venue | Team | Score | | Result (Margin) | Pos. | Ref. |
|---|---|---|---|---|---|---|---|---|
| 1 | Friday, 24 February | Sydney Football Stadium, Moore Park (Sydney) | ACT Brumbies | 25 | 31 | Lost (6 points) | 8th | |
| 2 | Saturday, 4 March | Melbourne Rectangular Stadium, Olympic Park (Melbourne) (Note: The second round of the 2023 Super Rugby season was designated the "Super Round," in which every team in the competition played in Melbourne. All but the Melbourne Rebels were playing in a neutral venue. The Fijian Drua was nominally the home team for the Waratahs fixture.) | Fijian Drua | 17 | 46 | Won (29 points) | 5th | |
| 3 | Friday, 10 March | Melbourne Rectangular Stadium, Olympic Park (Melbourne) | Rebels | 34 | 27 | Lost (7 points) | 7th | |
| 4 | Friday, 17 March | Wellington Regional Stadium, Pipitea (Wellington) | Hurricanes | 34 | 17 | Lost (17 points) | 9th | |
| 5 | Friday, 24 March | Sydney Football Stadium, Moore Park (Sydney) | Chiefs | 14 | 24 | Lost (10 points) | 11th | |
| 6 | Saturday, 1 April | Canberra Stadium, Bruce (Canberra) | ACT Brumbies | 40 | 36 | Lost (4 points) | 11th | |
| 7 | Bye | | | | | | 11th | |
| 8 | Saturday, 15 April | Sydney Football Stadium, Moore Park (Sydney) | Western Force | 36 | 16 | Won (20 points) | 9th | |
| 9 | Saturday, 22 April | Eden Park, Kingsland (Auckland) | Blues | 55 | 21 | Lost (34 points) | 10th | |
| 10 | Friday, 28 April | Sydney Football Stadium, Moore Park (Sydney) | Highlanders | 21 | 20 | Won (1 point) | 7th | |
| 11 | Saturday, 6 May | North Queensland Stadium, Townsville | Reds | 24 | 32 | Won (8 points) | 6th | |
| 12 | Saturday, 13 May | Sydney Football Stadium, Moore Park (Sydney) | Rebels | 38 | 20 | Won (18 points) | 6th | |
| 13 | Saturday, 20 May | Sydney Football Stadium, Moore Park (Sydney) | Fijian Drua | 32 | 18 | Won (14 points) | 6th | |
| 14 | Saturday, 27 May | Rugby League Park, Addington (Christchurch) | Crusaders | TBD | | | | |
| 15 | Saturday, 3 June | Sydney Football Stadium, Moore Park (Sydney) | Moana Pasifika | TBD | | | | |

== Statistics ==
(As of round five; 24 March 2023)

Top point scorer
| No. | Player | Pos. | Tries | Pen. | Con. | Pts. |
|---|---|---|---|---|---|---|
| 1 | Tane Edmed | Fly-half | 1 | 5 | 10 | 40 |
| 1 | Ben Donaldson | Fullback | 1 | 3 | 13 | 40 |
| 3 | Max Jorgensen | Fullback | 4 | 0 | 0 | 20 |
| 3 | Mark Nawaqanitawase | Wing | 4 | 0 | 0 | 20 |
| 5 | Jake Gordon | Scrum-half | 3 | 0 | 0 | 15 |
| 6 | Dave Porecki | Hooker | 2 | 0 | 0 | 10 |
| 6 | Dylan Pietsch | Wing | 2 | 0 | 0 | 10 |
| 6 | Langi Gleeson | Flanker | 2 | 0 | 0 | 10 |
| 6 | Izaia Perese | Centre | 2 | 0 | 0 | 10 |
| 10 | Michael Hooper | Flanker | 1 | 0 | 0 | 5 |
| 10 | Nemani Nadolo | Wing | 1 | 0 | 0 | 5 |
| 10 | Charlie Gamble | Flanker | 1 | 0 | 0 | 5 |
| 10 | Taleni Seu | Lock | 1 | 0 | 0 | 5 |
| 10 | Lalakai Foketi | Centre | 1 | 0 | 0 | 5 |
| 10 | Jed Holloway | Lock | 1 | 0 | 0 | 5 |
| 10 | Mahe Vailanu | Hooker | 1 | 0 | 0 | 5 |
| 10 | Teddy Wilson | Scrum-half | 1 | 0 | 0 | 5 |
| 10 | Harry Johnson-Holmes | Prop | 1 | 0 | 0 | 5 |
| 19 | Jack Bowen | Fly-half | 0 | 0 | 1 | 2 |

Top try scorer
| No. | Player | Pos. | Tries |
|---|---|---|---|
| 1 | Max Jorgensen | Fullback | 4 |
| 1 | Mark Nawaqanitawase | Wing | 4 |
| 3 | Jake Gordon | Scrum-half | 3 |
| 4 | Dave Porecki | Hooker | 2 |
| 4 | Dylan Pietsch | Wing | 2 |
| 4 | Langi Gleeson | Flanker | 2 |
| 4 | Izaia Perese | Centre | 2 |
| 8 | Tane Edmed | Fly-half | 1 |
| 8 | Ben Donaldson | Fullback | 1 |
| 8 | Michael Hooper | Flanker | 1 |
| 8 | Lalakai Foketi | Centre | 1 |
| 8 | Nemani Nadolo | Wing | 1 |
| 8 | Charlie Gamble | Flanker | 1 |
| 8 | Jed Holloway | Lock | 1 |
| 8 | Mahe Vailanu | Hooker | 1 |
| 8 | Teddy Wilson | Scrum-half | 1 |
| 8 | Taleni Seu | Lock | 1 |
| 8 | Harry Johnson-Holmes | Prop | 1 |
