= 2025 New South Wales Waratahs season =

New South Wales Waratahs
2024–25 (Note: The fixtures played beyond May 2024, outside of the Super Rugby, are 2025 pre-season matches.) season
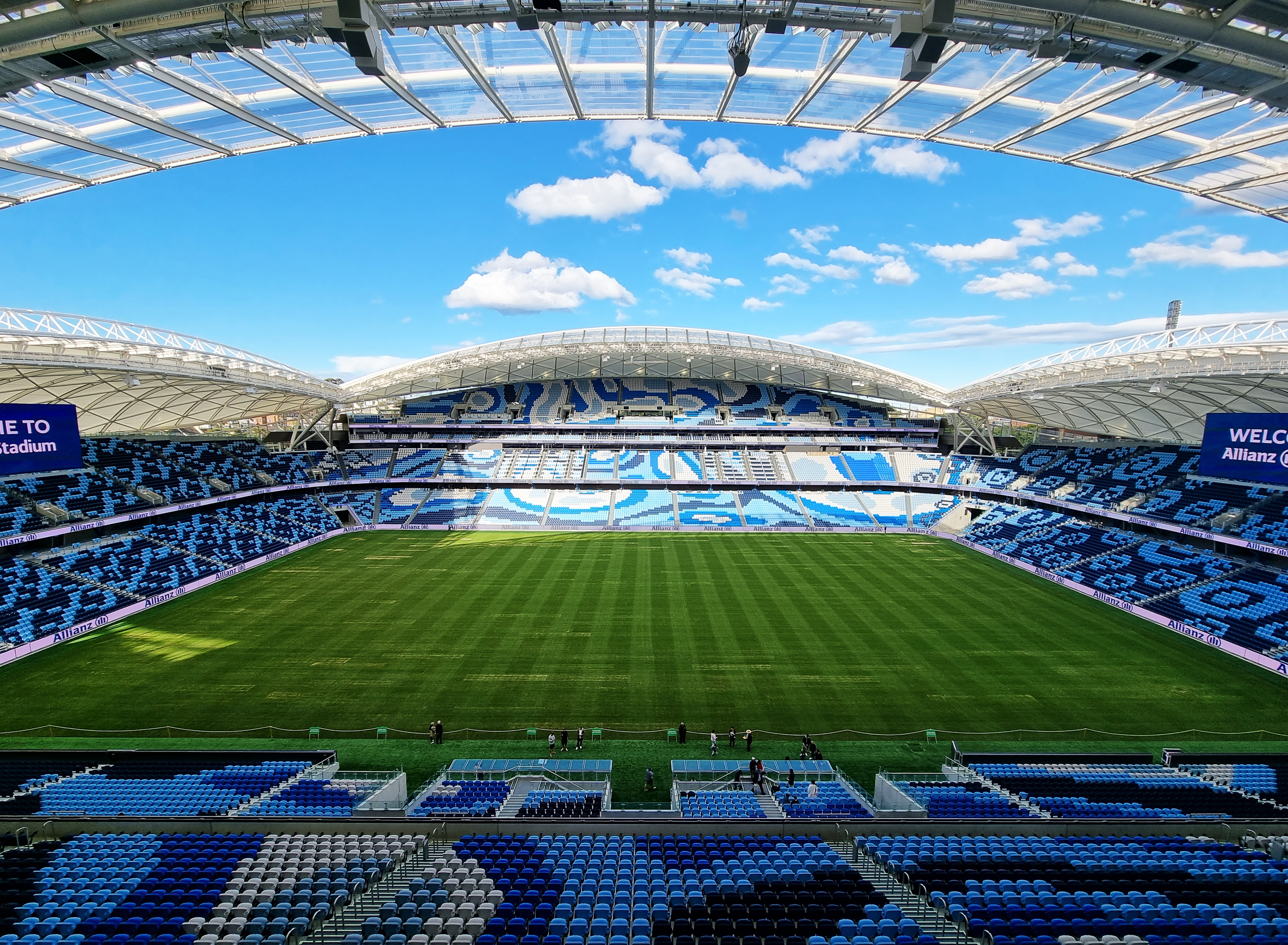
- The Waratahs play every 2025 home fixture at Sydney Football Stadium.
- President: Matt Burke
- Coach: Dan McKellar
- Stadium: Sydney Football Stadium, Moore Park, Sydney
- Super Rugby Pacific: 8th
- British & Irish Lions tour: Lost
- Super Rugby AUS: Champions
- Highest home attendance: 20,572 vs. ACT Brumbies, 22 March
- Lowest home attendance: 11,000 vs. Western Force, 8 March
- Average home league attendance: 15,466
- Biggest win: 34–10 vs. Western Force, (Home) 8 March
- Biggest defeat: 12–57 vs. Hurricanes, (Away) 28 March
Home colours	Away colours
- All statistics correct as of 31 May 2025.

The 2025 New South Wales Waratahs season was their 29th and most recent season in the Super Rugby since entering the professional era in 1996. Although the pre-season began in 2024 with a tour to Japan, the domestic season began in February 2025 and finished in May, before playing a one-off home fixture against the touring British & Irish Lions in July 2025.

In June 2025 it was announced by Rugby Australia (RA) that a new domestic competition, Super Rugby AUS, would be begin in September 2025. The new competition would only consist of the four Australian Super Rugby franchises: the ACT Brumbies, New South Wales Waratahs, Queensland Reds, and the Western Force, and would largely be in place to support a professional pathway from amateur rugby to professional rugby, as well as non-international Australian players post-Super Rugby season.

== Squad and personnel ==
“Who should be the next Waratahs coach?” The Sydney Morning Herald readers' poll (21–30 May 2024)
Candidate	%
Michael Cheika	39%
John Manenti	17%
Simon Raiwalui	13%
Stephen Hoiles	12%
Other	9%
Nathan Grey	8%
Jason Gilmore	1%

=== Coaching personnel ===
In May 2024 the New South Wales Rugby Union (NSWRU) confirmed that New South Wales Waratahs head coach since 2021, (Note: Coleman was signed to the New South Wales Waratahs in June/July 2021, however the season did not begin until February 2022.) Darren Coleman, would be released at the conclusion of the 2024 season. At the time of the announcement Coleman's injury-plagued Waratahs had won just two matches from twelve, and sat bottom of the ladder. At the end of the 2023 season the Waratahs had finished sixth on the seasonal ladder, as they did the previous season, and were knocked out of the Finals in the Quarter-finals stage. Coleman stated to The Sydney Morning Herald immediately following the season that although he loved the job, he did not feel great, stating: “I firmly believe we are trending in the right way... We haven't spoken about an extension, and nor would I expect them to come to me, given the season we just had. I'll keep my head down, work hard, get results next year and hopefully stay on if they want me. If not, I get it, you’ve got to win and win championships to keep the job.” When Coleman was announced as the new head coach on a three-year deal in July 2021 he was reported to be one of four final candidates vying for the position, which included Australia women's sevens coach John Manenti; Western Force assistant and former Fiji head coach John McKee; and Cardiff head coach John Mulvihill. Under Coleman's tenure (2022–2024) the Waratahs obtained a 36% win ratio.

Following the announcement that Coleman's contract would not be extended, The Sydney Morning Herald cited Michael Cheika, Nathan Grey, Stephen Hoiles and John Manenti as potential front-runners for the role, and published an article focused specifically on National Rugby League-linked, former Waratahs coach Michael Cheika. Later that same day (21 May 2024), the same publication gave readers a poll of six candidates, asking: “Who should be the next Waratahs coach?” Michael Cheika was polled the highest at 39%, with almost 4,000 votes cast. The following month they published an article discussing four candidates with high-level experience: Nathan Grey, Andy Friend, Michael Cheika and Kevin Foote. In late June, following expressions of interest from the Waratahs, former Australia and England attack coach Scott Wisemantel was put forward as a potential candidate, according to confidential sources. Finally on 3 July 2024 it was confirmed that the new coach of the Waratahs was Dan McKellar. McKellar signed on a three-year deal, and was immediately considered the front-runner for the job upon news of his sacking and replacement for Michael Cheika as head coach of English club Leicester Tigers just two weeks earlier. McKellar was joined by former Fiji coach Simon Raiwalui as Director of Performance alongside England international veteran and former Ireland attack coach Mike Catt. All three would serve as part of the teams high-performance staff.

Coaching personnel
Position		Coach
Head coach		Dan McKellar
Assistant coach	Attack coach	Mike Catt
Assistant coach	Set Piece coach	Dan Palmer
Assistant coach	Defence coach	Lachlan McCaffrey
Director of Performance		Simon Raiwalui

=== Squad ===
After a very active off-season with transfers, the Waratahs announced their pre-season squad to tour Japan in November 2024 with new coach Dan McKellar. The squad included a sizeable youth contingent and various new signings. Only one player was signed in 2025, with the earliest signing for the 2025 season being "dual code" international Joseph Sua'ali'i in March 2023.

The Waratahs' squad for the 2025 Super Rugby Pacific season was announced on 12 November 2024.

==== Senior squad ====
Waratahs senior squad
**Props**: **Isaac Aedo Kailea**; Brad Amituanai; Siosifa Amone; Jack Barrett; **Angus Bell**; Daniel Botha; Adrian Brown; Tom Lambert; **Taniela Tupou**; **Hookers**: Ethan Dobbins; Julian Heaven; **Dave Porecki**; Mahe Vailanu; **Locks**: Ale Aho; Miles Amatosero; Ben Grant; Clem Halaholo; Felix Kalapu (Note: Kalapu wasn't named in the original Waratahs squad, but was announced in the side for Round 4.); **Mesu Kunavula**; Hugh Sinclair; Angelo Smith	**Loose forwards**: Jamie Adamson; Charlie Gamble; **Langi Gleeson**; Fergus Lee-Warner; **Rob Leota**; Leafi Talataina^{DEV}; **Scrum-halves**: **Jake Gordon**; Jack Grant; Teddy Wilson; **Fly-halves**: Jack Bowen; Lawson Creighton; **Tane Edmed**	**Centres**: **Lalakai Foketi**; Henry O'Donnell; **Joseph Sua'ali'i**; Joey Walton; **Outside backs**: James Hendren; **Max Jorgensen**; **Andrew Kellaway**; Darby Lancaster; Triston Reilly
(cc) denotes team co-captains, **Bold** denotes internationally capped, ^{DEV} denotes a development/academy squad squad player, ^{ST} denotes a short-term signing, denotes a player ruled out for the season with injury.

==== Academy squad ====
Waratahs academy squad
**Props**: **Will Goddard**; **Nate Tiitii**; **Hookers**: **Bryn Edwards**; **Oniti Finau**; **Locks**: **Eamon Doyle**; **Aden Ekanayake**	**Loose forwards**: **Ben Di Staso**; **Austin Durbidge**; **Scrum-halves**: **Billy Dickens**; **Hwi Sharples**; **Fly-halves**: **Joe Dillon**	**Centres**: Zach Fittler; **Jackson Ropata**; **Outside backs**: **Archie Saunders**
**Bold** denotes internationally capped at youth level.

== Transfers ==
=== In ===
Date	Pos.	Player	From	Ref.
25 March 2023	Outside back	Joseph Sua'ali'i	Sydney Roosters (NRL)	
20 June 2024	Outside back	Andrew Kellaway	Melbourne Rebels	
July 2024 (Note: News published in mid-July asserted that Tupou was set to sign for the Waratahs, however an official announcement was not made until 2 August 2024.)	Prop	Taniela Tupou	Melbourne Rebels	
30 July 2024	Outside back	Darby Lancaster	Melbourne Rebels	
31 July 2024	Flanker	Rob Leota	Melbourne Rebels	
21 August 2024	Prop	Isaac Aedo Kailea	Melbourne Rebels	
September 2024	Prop	Siosifa Amone	Western Force	
September 2024	Centre	Henry O'Donnell	Western Force	
September 2024	Lock	Angelo Smith	Melbourne Rebels	
September 2024	Lock	Ben Grant	Hurricanes	
September 2024	Hooker	Ethan Dobbins	Melbourne Rebels	
September 2024	Flanker	Leafi Talataina	Sydney University	
9 September 2024	Fly-half	Lawson Creighton	Queensland Reds	
25 September 2024	Centre	Zach Fittler	Free agent	
2024	Lock	Ale Aho	Otago	
2024	Prop	Adrian Brown	Warringah	
2024	Outside back	James Hendren	Randwick	
2024	Lock	Clem Halaholo	Sydney University	
11 January 2025	Flanker	Jamie Adamson	Easts	

=== Out ===
Date	Pos.	Player	To	Ref.
November 2023	Flanker	Lachlan Swinton	Bordeaux Bègles	
6 December 2023	Outside back	Mark Nawaqanitawase	Sydney Roosters (NRL)	
21 March 2024	Centre	Izaia Perese	Leicester Tigers	
2 May 2024	Centre	Harry Wilson	Dragons	
6 May 2024	Centre	Mosese Tuipulotu	Edinburgh	
16 May 2024	Flanker	Ned Hanigan	Provence	
13 June 2024	Prop	Tom Ross	Stade Niçois	
15 July 2024	Prop	Harry Johnson-Holmes	Western Force	
July 2024	Lock	Ollie McCrea	Stade Français	
July 2024	Fly-half	Will Harrison	Hanazono Kintetsu Liners	
29 August 2024	Outside back	Vuate Karawalevu	Fijian Drua	
4 September 2024	Prop	Archer Holz	Scarlets	
5 September 2024	Prop	Enrique Pieretto	Provence	
13 September 2024	Outside back	Dylan Pietsch	Western Force	
13 September 2024	Prop	Pone Fa'amausili	Moana Pasifika	
13 September 2024	Prop	Hayden Thompson-Stringer	Provence	
26 November 2024	Lock	Jed Holloway	Leicester Tigers (Note: Holloway initially requested an early release from the club at the end of the 2024 season. He subsequently joined the Leicester Tigers in November 2024.)	
27 November 2024	Hooker	Ben Sugars	Los Angeles	
17 December 2024	Prop	Michael Scott	Houston SaberCats	
2024	Prop	Paddy Ryan	—N/a	
2024	Prop	Harry Lloyd	—N/a	

== Season results ==
=== Pre-season ===
Waratahs score shown first; only non-Australian teams with flag displayed.

2025 Pre-season results
Date	Venue	Team	Score	Result (Margin)	Ref.
Friday, 29 November (2024)	Edogawa Stadium, Edogawa, Tokyo (Japan)	Kubota Spears	43–17	Won (26 points)	
Saturday, 25 January	Eric Tweedale Stadium, Merrylands, New South Wales	New South Wales Pacifica	73–7	Won (66 points)	
Saturday, 1 February	Bowral Rugby Club, Burradoo, New South Wales	ACT Brumbies	36–36	Draw	

=== Summary and fixtures ===
Round	1	2	3	4	5	6	7	8	9	10	11	12	13	14	15	16
Ground	H	—	H	H	A	H	A	A	H	A	—	A	H	H	A	A
Result	W	—	W	W	L	W	L	L	W	L	—	L	L	L	W	L
Position	5	6	5	2	5	4	5	6	5	6	7	9	8	8	8	8

Source: Super Rugby
A = Away; H = Home; W = Win; D = Draw; L = Loss
Notes: Positions show the situation at the end of the corresponding Game Round (GR); not the position at the conclusion of matches or game days

Waratahs score shown first; only non-Australian teams with flag displayed.

2025 Super Rugby season
Rnd.	Date	Venue	Team	Score	Result (Margin)	Attendance	Pos.	Ref.
1	Friday, 14 February	Sydney Football Stadium, Moore Park (Sydney)	Highlanders	37–36	Won (1 point)	16,034	5th	
2	Bye						6th	—N/a
3	Friday, 28 February	Sydney Football Stadium, Moore Park (Sydney)	Fijian Drua	29–24	Won (5 points)	16,150	5th	
4	Saturday, 8 March	Sydney Football Stadium, Moore Park (Sydney)	Western Force	34–10	Won (24 points)	11,000	2nd	
5	Saturday, 15 March	Lang Park, Milton (Brisbane)	Queensland Reds	15–35	Lost (20 points)	20,072	5th	
6	Saturday, 22 March	Sydney Football Stadium, Moore Park (Sydney)	ACT Brumbies	28–23	Won (5 points)	20,572	4th	
7	Friday, 28 March	Wellington Regional Stadium, Pipitea (Wellington)	Hurricanes	12–57	Lost (45 points)	9,202	5th	
8	Saturday, 5 April	North Harbour Stadium, Albany (Auckland)	Moana Pasifika	28–45	Lost (17 points)	—N/a (Note: Attendance figures not published.)	6th	
9	Friday, 11 April	Sydney Football Stadium, Moore Park (Sydney)	Chiefs	21–14	Won (7 points)	14,278	5th	
10	Saturday, 19 April	Churchill Park, Lautoka	Fijian Drua	14–28	Lost (14 points)	—N/a	6th	
11	Bye						7th	
12	Saturday, 3 May	Canberra Stadium, Bruce (Canberra)	ACT Brumbies	17–40	Lost (23 points)	9,183	9th	
13	Friday, 9 May	Sydney Football Stadium, Moore Park (Sydney)	Queensland Reds	21–28	Lost (7 points)	18,945	8th	
14	Friday, 16 May	Sydney Football Stadium, Moore Park (Sydney)	Crusaders	33–48	Lost (15 points)	11,284	8th	
15	Saturday, 24 May	Perth Rectangular Stadium, Perth	Western Force	22–17	Won (5 points) (Note: In Super Point)	5,165	8th	
16	Saturday, 31 May	Eden Park, Kingsland (Auckland)	Blues	6–46	Lost (40 points)	—N/a	8th	

=== Ladder ===
2025 Super Rugby Pacific ladder
Pos	Team	Pld	W	D	L	PF	PA	PD	TF	TA	TB	LB	Pts	Qualification
1	Chiefs	14	11	0	3	550	319	+231	75	45	5	2	51	Qualifying finals
2	Crusaders	14	11	0	3	471	371	+100	70	51	5	0	49	Qualifying finals
3	Brumbies	14	9	0	5	448	361	+87	66	50	4	4	44	Qualifying finals
4	Hurricanes	14	8	1	5	448	342	+106	63	46	2	3	39	Qualifying finals
5	Reds	14	8	0	6	425	371	+54	63	52	4	2	38	Qualifying finals
6	Blues	14	6	0	8	377	330	+47	55	41	5	4	33	Qualifying finals
7	Moana Pasifika	14	6	0	8	405	544	−139	60	80	2	2	28	
8	Waratahs	14	6	0	8	317	451	−134	46	67	1	1	26	
9	Force	14	4	1	9	358	472	−114	51	70	2	3	23	
10	Drua	14	4	0	10	317	465	−148	45	73	1	3	20	
11	Highlanders	14	3	0	11	332	422	−90	43	62	1	7	20	

Source: Super Rugby

=== British & Irish Lions tour ===
Waratahs score shown first.

2025 British & Irish Lions tour
Date	Venue	Team	Score	Result (Margin)	Ref.
Saturday, 5 July	Sydney Football Stadium, Moore Park (Sydney)	British and Irish Lions	10–21	Lost (11 points)	

=== Super Rugby AUS ===
==== Summary and fixtures ====
Round	1	2	3
Ground	H	H	A
Result	L	W	W
Position	4	2	2

Source: Super Rugby
A = Away; H = Home; W = Win; D = Draw; L = Loss
Notes: Positions show the situation at the end of the corresponding Game Round (GR); not the position at the conclusion of matches or game days

2025 Super Rugby AUS
Rnd.	Date	Venue	Team	Score	Result (Margin)	Pos.	Ref.
1	Saturday, 13 September	Pittwater Park, Warriewood	Western Force	3–24	Lost (21 points)	4th	
2	Saturday, 20 September	Dangar Park, Narrabri	Queensland Reds	47–19	Won (28 points)	2nd	
3	Saturday, 27 September	Viking Park, Wanniassa (Canberra)	ACT Brumbies	42–34	Won (8 points)	2nd	
Finals series
GF	Sunday, 5 October	Kingsway Regional Sporting Complex, Wanneroo	Western Force	33–26	Won (7 points)	—N/a	

=== Ladder ===
Pos	Team	Pld	W	D	L	PF	PA	PD	TF	TA	TB	LB	Pts	Qualification
1	Force	3	2	0	1	92	85	+7	15	11	2	0	10	Qualification for the Grand Final
2	Waratahs (C)	3	2	0	1	92	77	+15	13	12	1	0	9	Qualification for the Grand Final
3	Reds	3	2	0	1	102	95	+7	16	15	1	0	9	
4	Brumbies	3	0	0	3	95	124	−29	15	20	0	0	0	

Source: Rugby.com.au
Rules for classification: 1) Points; 2) Head-to-head; 3) Number of wins; 4) Point difference
(C) Champion

== Statistics ==
As of 31 May 2025; Figures do not include pre-season trials, the post-season Lions tour, or the 2025 Super Rugby AUS.

Top point-scorers
Pos.	Player	Position	Tries	Con.	Pen.	Drop.	Points
1	Tane Edmed	Fly-half	0	16	3	0	41
2	Lawson Creighton	Fly-half	1	14	1	0	36
3	Triston Reilly	Outside back	7	0	0	0	35
3	Langi Gleeson	Flanker	7	0	0	0	35
5	Darby Lancaster	Outside back	4	0	0	0	20
6	Teddy Wilson	Scrum-half	3	0	0	0	15
6	Max Jorgensen	Wing	3	0	0	0	15
6	Rob Leota	Flanker	3	0	0	0	15
6	Andrew Kellaway	Outside back	3	0	0	0	15
10	Jack Bowen	Fly-half	0	2	3	0	13
11	Siosifa Amone	Prop	2	0	0	0	10
11	Dave Porecki	Hooker	2	0	0	0	10
11	Joseph Sua'ali'i	Centre / Outside back	2	0	0	0	10
14	Penalty try						7
15	Julian Heaven	Hooker	1	0	0	0	5
15	Archie Saunders	Outside back	1	0	0	0	5
15	Joey Walton	Centre	1	0	0	0	5
15	Jake Gordon	Scrum-half	1	0	0	0	5
15	Henry O'Donnell	Centre	1	0	0	0	5
15	Taniela Tupou	Prop	1	0	0	0	5
15	Felix Kalapu	Lock	1	0	0	0	5
15	Miles Amatosero	Lock	1	0	0	0	5

Top try-scorers
Pos.	Player	Position	Tries
1	Triston Reilly	Outside back	7
1	Langi Gleeson	Flanker	7
3	Darby Lancaster	Outside back	4
4	Max Jorgensen	Outside back	3
4	Teddy Wilson	Scrum-half	3
4	Rob Leota	Flanker	3
4	Andrew Kellaway	Outside back	3
8	Joseph Sua'ali'i	Centre / Outside back	2
8	Siosifa Amone	Prop	2
8	Dave Porecki	Hooker	2
11	Joey Walton	Centre	1
11	Felix Kalapu	Lock	1
11	Miles Amatosero	Lock	1
11	Archie Saunders	Outside back	1
11	Jake Gordon	Scrum-half	1
11	Henry O'Donnell	Centre	1
11	Taniela Tupou	Prop	1
11	Lawson Creighton	Fly-half	1
11	Julian Heaven	Hooker	1
11	Penalty try		1
