= List of 2023 Super Rugby Pacific matches =

This article contains a list of all matches played during the 2023 Super Rugby Pacific regular season.

== Round 1 ==
24 February 2023
19:05 (GMT +13)

Crusaders	10–31	Chiefs
Try: David Havili 20'; Con: Richie Mo'unga (1/1) 21'; Pen: Richie Mo'unga (0/1); Drop: Richie Mo'unga (1/1) 13'; Cards: Ethan Blackadder (yellow card) 59' to 69'	Report	Try: Brodie Retallick 33'; Sam Cane 49'; Alex Nankivell 59'; Cortez Ratima 69'; Con: Damian McKenzie (4/4) 34', 50', 60', 71'; Pen: Damian McKenzie (1/3) 67'; Cards: Sam Cane (yellow card) 19' to 29'

Orangetheory Stadium, Christchurch
Referee: Ben O'Keeffe (New Zealand)

24 February 2023
19:35 (GMT +11)

Waratahs	25–31	Brumbies
Try: Max Jorgensen (2) 15', 50'; Jake Gordon 61'; Con: Tane Edmed (2/3) 16', 51'; Pen: Tane Edmed (2/3) 22', 80+2'	Report	Try: Ryan Lonergan 7'; Andy Muirhead 36'; Corey Toole 58'; Con: Ryan Lonergan (1/2) 8'; Noah Lolesio (1/1) 60'; Pen: Ryan Lonergan (3/3) 24', 44', 46'; Noah Lolesio (1/1) 75'

Allianz Stadium, Sydney
Attendance: 25,076
Referee: Nic Berry (Australia)

25 February 2023
16:35 (GMT +13)

Moana Pasifika	34–36	Drua
Try: Abraham Pole (2) 2', 51'; Chris Apoua 8'; Michael Curry 24'; Danny Toala 39'; Con: Christian Lealiifano (3/5) 9', 25', 40+1'; Pen: Christian Lealiifano (1/1) 69'; Cards: Sam Slade (yellow card) 27' to 37'	Report	Try: Tevita Ikanivere (2) 20', 45'; Joseva Tamani 28'; Iosefo Masi (2) 36', 58'; Taniela Rakuro 77'; Con: Teti Tela (2/4) 29', 37'; Caleb Muntz (1/2) 59'

Mt Smart Stadium, Auckland
Referee: James Doleman (New Zealand)

25 February 2023
19:05 (GMT +13)

Highlanders	20–60	Blues
Try: Mitch Hunt 36'; Josh Timu 40+7'; Con: Sam Gilbert (2/2) 37', 40+8'; Pen: Sam Gilbert (2/2) 8', 17'	Report	Try: Mark Tele'a (2) 13', 73'; Beauden Barrett 21'; Caleb Clarke 24'; Rieko Ioane (2) 27', 78'; Marcel Renata 54'; Dalton Papalii 69'; Con: Beauden Barrett (7/8) 14', 22', 26', 28', 55', 74', 79'; Pen: Beauden Barrett (2/2) 5', 48'; Cards: Cameron Suafoa (yellow card) 34' to 40+5'; Roger Tuivasa-Sheck (yellow card) 40+5' to 50'

Forsyth Barr Stadium, Dunedin
Attendance: 13,000
Referee: Paul Williams (New Zealand)

25 February 2023
18:45 (GMT +10)

Reds	13–47	Hurricanes
Try: Jordan Petaia 29'; Con: Tom Lynagh (1/1) 30'; Pen: Tom Lynagh (2/2) 3', 12'; Cards: Ryan Smith (yellow card) 34' to 44'; Seru Uru (yellow card) 44' to 54'	Report	Try: Billy Proctor 31'; Penalty try 44'; Cam Roigard 54'; Jamie Booth 70'; Julian Savea 72'; Tyrel Lomax 80'; Con: Jordie Barrett (3/4) 33', 55', 71'; Aidan Morgan (0/1); Pen: Jordie Barrett (3/3) 21', 27', 35'; Cards: Du'Plessis Kirifi (yellow card) 66' to 76'

Queensland Country Bank Stadium, Townsville
Attendance: 8,433
Referee: Angus Gardner (Australia)

25 February 2023
19:00 (GMT +8)

Force	34–27	Rebels
Try: Tom Robertson 33'; Tom Horton (2) 50', 64'; Jeremy Thrush 72'; Con: Bryce Hegarty (4/4) 34', 51', 65', 73'; Pen: Bryce Hegarty (2/2) 23', 40+2'	Report	Try: Carter Gordon 16'; Ryan Louwrens 24'; Brad Wilkin 36'; Con: Reece Hodge (3/3) 17', 25', 37'; Pen: Reece Hodge (2/3) 2', 67'; Cards: Lachie Anderson (yellow card) 50' to 60'

HBF Park, Perth
Attendance: 6,885
Referee: Damon Murphy (Australia)

== Round 2 – Super Round ==
3 March 2023
18:00 (GMT +10)

Crusaders	52–15	Highlanders
Try: Sevu Reece 13'; Fergus Burke 32'; Joe Moody 40'; Richie Mo'unga 42'; David Havili 48'; Codie Taylor 56'; Leicester Fainga'anuku 68'; Con: Richie Mo'unga (7/7) 14', 33', 40+1', 43', 49', 57', 68'; Pen: Richie Mo'unga (1/1) 27'	Report	Try: Josh Timu (2) 73', 79'; Con: Freddie Burns (1/2) 80'; Pen: Sam Gilbert (1/1) 9'; Cards: Pari Pari Parkinson (yellow card) 55' to 65'

AAMI Park, Melbourne
Attendance: 15,282
Referee: Nic Berry (Australia)

3 March 2023
20:10 (GMT +10)

Rebels	33–39	Hurricanes
Try: Brad Wilkin 3'; Lachie Anderson 46'; Carter Gordon 55'; Richard Hardwick (2) 68', 74'; Con: Reece Hodge (4/5) 4', 57', 69', 75'; Cards: Brad Wilkin (yellow card) 35' to 47'	Report	Try: Ardie Savea (2) 13', 28'; Josh Moorby 36'; Salesi Rayasi 63'; Jordie Barrett 78'; Con: Jordie Barrett (4/5) 14', 29', 37', 64'; Pen: Jordie Barrett (2/2) 22', 59'; Cards: Ardie Savea (yellow card) 40+1' to 50'; Tevita Mafileo (red card) 43'

AAMI Park, Melbourne
Attendance: 15,282
Referee: James Doleman (New Zealand)

4 March 2023
17:05 (GMT +10)

Moana Pasifika	29–52	Chiefs
Try: Timoci Tavatavanawai 43'; Sam Moli 51'; Solomone Funaki 68'; Penalty try 75'; Con: Christian Lealiifano (2/3) 53', 69'; Pen: Christian Lealiifano (1/1) 6'	Report	Try: Rameka Poihipi 1'; Liam Coombes-Fabling 13'; Brad Weber (2) 19', 34'; Shaun Stevenson (3) 23', 54', 70'; Damian McKenzie 38'; Con: Damian McKenzie (5/7) 2', 14', 20', 39', 55'; Bryn Gatland (1/1) 70'; Cards: Brad Weber (yellow card) 51' to 61'; Cortez Ratima (yellow card) 68' to 76'; Bryn Gatland (yellow card) 75' to FT'

AAMI Park, Melbourne
Referee: Angus Gardner (Australia)

4 March 2023
19:45 (GMT +10)

Drua	17–46	Waratahs
Try: Joseva Tamani 32'; Tevita Ikanivere 43'; Con: Caleb Muntz (2/2) 33', 45'; Pen: Caleb Muntz (1/1) 18'; Cards: Jone Tiko (yellow card) 19' to 29'; Zuriel Togiatama (yellow card) 68' to 78'	Report	Try: Dave Porecki 11'; Ben Donaldson 49'; Langi Gleeson 57'; Tane Edmed 62'; Max Jorgensen 68'; Mark Nawaqanitawase 74'; Con: Tane Edmed (5/5) 12', 49', 58', 63', 70'; Ben Donaldson (0/1); Pen: Tane Edmed (1/2) 39'; Ben Donaldson (1/1) 80+1'

AAMI Park, Melbourne
Attendance: 11,118
Referee: Jordan Way (Australia)

5 March 2023
14:00 (GMT +10)

Blues	20–25	Brumbies
Try: Ricky Riccitelli 13'; Tom Robinson 30'; Con: Beauden Barrett (2/2) 14', 32'; Pen: Beauden Barrett (2/2) 25', 29'; Cards: Caleb Clarke (yellow card) 7' to 17'; James Lay (yellow card) 8' to 18'	Report	Try: Penalty try 7'; Andy Muirhead 18'; Lachlan Lonergan 35'; Con: Ryan Lonergan (1/2) 19'; Pen: Ryan Lonergan (2/2) 2', 27'

AAMI Park, Melbourne
Referee: Ben O'Keeffe (New Zealand)

5 March 2023
16:30 (GMT +10)

Force	20–71	Reds
Try: Zach Kibirige 11'; Folau Fainga'a 31'; Jackson Pugh 72'; Con: Bryce Hegarty (1/3) 73'; Pen: Bryce Hegarty (1/1) 14'; Cards: Ollie Callan (red card) 60'; Jackson Pugh (yellow card) 74'	Report	Try: Ryan Smith 6'; Jordan Petaia 7'; Harry Wilson 24'; Josh Flook (2) 37', 77'; Matt Faessler 46'; Filipo Daugunu (2) 51', 75'; Suliasi Vunivalu 56'; Liam Wright 62'; Con: Tom Lynagh (5/6) 7', 8', 38', 46', 52'; James O'Connor (4/4) 57', 63', 76', 79'; Pen: Tom Lynagh (1/1) 18'; Cards: Harry Wilson (yellow card) 30' to 40'

AAMI Park, Melbourne
Referee: Paul Williams (New Zealand)

== Round 3 ==
10 March 2023
19:05 (GMT +13)

Chiefs	28–7	Highlanders
Try: Etene Nanai-Seturo 6'; Shaun Stevenson (2) 52', 74'; Samipeni Finau 55'; Con: Damian McKenzie (1/4) 76'; Pen: Damian McKenzie (2/3) 25', 47'; Cards: Sam Cane (yellow card) 58' to 68'	Report	Try: Mosese Dawai 59'; Con: Freddie Burns (1/1) 60'; Pen: Freddie Burns (0/1); Cards: Shannon Frizell (yellow card) 51' to 61'

FMG Stadium Waikato, Hamilton
Attendance: 12,138
Referee: Paul Williams (New Zealand)

10 March 2023
19:35 (GMT +11)

Rebels	34–27	Waratahs
Try: Reece Hodge 23'; Lachie Anderson 26'; Richard Hardwick 35'; Matt Gibbon 61'; Carter Gordon 65'; Con: Reece Hodge (3/5) 24', 62', 66'; Pen: Reece Hodge (1/1) 74'	Report	Try: Mark Nawaqanitawase 47'; Charlie Gamble 55'; Taleni Seu 80+1'; Con: Tane Edmed (3/3) 48', 56', 80+2'; Pen: Tane Edmed (2/2) 9', 30'

AAMI Park, Melbourne
Attendance: 3,304
Referee: Angus Gardner (Australia)

11 March 2023
15:35 (GMT +12)

Drua	25–24	Crusaders
Try: Iosefo Masi 30'; Ilaisa Droasese 50'; Joseva Tamani 61'; Eroni Sau 67'; Con: Teti Tela (1/4) 51'; Pen: Teti Tela (0/1); Kemu Valetini (1/1) 80+3'	Report	Try: Quentin MacDonald (2) 11', 22'; Sevu Reece 74'; Ioane Moananu 78'; Con: Fergus Burke (2/4) 23', 79'

Churchill Park, Lautoka
Attendance: 13,000
Referee: Brendon Pickerill (New Zealand)

11 March 2023
19:05 (GMT +13)

Hurricanes	19–25	Blues
Try: Tyrel Lomax 26'; Salesi Rayasi 47'; Josh Moorby 50'; Con: Jordie Barrett (2/3) 48', 51'; Cards: Isaia Walker-Leawere (yellow card) 32' to 42'	Report	Try: Patrick Tuipulotu 20'; Caleb Clarke 36'; Hoskins Sotutu 40'; Con: Stephen Perofeta (2/3) 21', 40'; Pen: Beauden Barrett (0/1); Stephen Perofeta (2/3) 10', 72'; Cards: Cameron Suafoa (yellow card) 47' to 57'

Sky Stadium, Wellington
Attendance: 12,771
Referee: Nic Berry (Australia)

11 March 2023
19:45 (GMT +11)

Brumbies	23–17	Reds
Try: Nic White 27'; Lachlan Lonergan 55'; Con: Noah Lolesio (2/2) 28', 56'; Pen: Noah Lolesio (3/4) 11', 32', 50'	Report	Try: Harry Wilson 47'; Jordan Petaia (2) 52', 70'; Con: James O'Connor (1/3) 47'

GIO Stadium, Canberra
Attendance: 8,501
Referee: James Doleman (New Zealand)

11 March 2023
19:00 (GMT +8)

Force	21–18	Moana Pasifika
Try: Folau Fainga'a 35'; George Poolman 61'; Con: Bryce Hegarty (1/2) 36'; Pen: Bryce Hegarty (3/3) 4', 15', 80+3'; Cards: Santiago Medrano (yellow card) 50' to 60'; Ollie Callan (yellow card) 71' to FT'; Siosifa Amone (red card) 75'	Report	Try: Fine Inisi 1'; Sam Moli 25'; Con: Lincoln McClutchie (1/2) 2'; Pen: Lincoln McClutchie (2/2) 9', 56'; Cards: Suetena Asomua (yellow card) 35' to 45'; Mike McKee (red card) 46'

HBF Park, Perth
Attendance: 6,497
Referee: Jordan Way (Australia)

== Round 4 ==
17 March 2023
19:05 (GMT +13)

Hurricanes	34–17	Waratahs
Try: Cam Roigard (2) 19', 51'; Kini Naholo (2) 28', 55'; Dane Coles 70'; Con: Jordie Barrett (3/5) 20', 30', 56'; Pen: Jordie Barrett (1/1) 13'	Report	Try: Nemani Nadolo 14'; Max Jorgensen 23'; Langi Gleeson 74'; Con: Ben Donaldson (1/3) 25'

Sky Stadium, Wellington
Attendance: 6,341
Referee: Brendon Pickerill (New Zealand)

18 March 2023
16:35 (GMT +13)

Chiefs	44–25	Rebels
Try: Rameka Poihipi 21'; Emoni Narawa 34'; Shaun Stevenson (2) 37', 45'; Tyrone Thompson 42'; Etene Nanai-Seturo 53'; Con: Bryn Gatland (4/6) 22', 35', 38', 43'; Pen: Bryn Gatland (2/2) 17', 32'	Report	Try: Alex Mafi 11'; Stacey Ili 39'; Nick Jooste 48'; David Feliuai 74'; Con: Reece Hodge (0/1); Carter Gordon (1/3) 40+1'; Pen: Reece Hodge (1/1) 6'

FMG Stadium Waikato, Hamilton
Attendance: 11,026
Referee: Dan Waenga (New Zealand)

18 March 2023
19:05 (GMT +13)

Blues	28–34	Crusaders
Try: Mark Tele'a 8'; Caleb Clarke 24'; Roger Tuivasa-Sheck 28'; Stephen Perofeta 55'; Con: Beauden Barrett (4/4) 9', 26', 28', 56'; Cards: Jordan Lay (yellow card) 36' to 46'	Report	Try: Fergus Burke 16'; Ethan Blackadder 21'; Leicester Fainga'anuku (3) 32', 37', 46'; Con: Richie Mo'unga (3/5) 22', 34', 47'; Pen: Richie Mo'unga (1/1) 65'; Cards: Kershawl Sykes-Martin (yellow card) 66' to 76'

Eden Park, Auckland
Attendance: 19,885
Referee: James Doleman (New Zealand)

18 March 2023
19:45 (GMT +11)

Brumbies	62–36	Moana Pasifika
Try: Tamati Tua 15'; Pete Samu 22'; Luke Reimer (2) 30', 39'; Andy Muirhead (2) 46', 65'; Jack Debreczeni 58'; Ben O'Donnell 72'; Corey Toole 77'; Con: Noah Lolesio (3/5) 16', 31', 40'; Ryan Lonergan (4/4) 59', 66', 73', 79'; Pen: Noah Lolesio (1/1) 5'	Report	Try: Miracle Faiʻilagi 2'; Alamanda Motuga (2) 9', 43'; Fine Inisi 36'; Sam Moli 52'; Con: Christian Lealiifano (4/5) 3', 11', 44', 54'; Pen: Christian Lealiifano (1/1) 26'; Cards: Timoci Tavatavanawai (yellow card) 29' to 39'

GIO Stadium, Canberra
Attendance: 7,011
Referee: Graham Cooper (Australia)

19 March 2023
15:35 (GMT +13)

Highlanders	43–35	Force
Try: Jonah Lowe (2) 15', 71'; Mitch Hunt 40+1'; Sam Gilbert 48'; Sean Withy 61'; Hugh Renton 77'; Con: Sam Gilbert (5/6) 16', 49', 62', 72', 78'; Pen: Sam Gilbert (1/1) 28'; Cards: Mitch Hunt (yellow card) 29' to 39'	Report	Try: Zach Kibirige 36'; Tom Horton 44'; Bryce Hegarty 52'; Siosifa Amone 80'; Ollie Callan 80+3'; Con: Bryce Hegarty (1/2) 37'; Bayley Kuenzle (1/3) 53'; Pen: Bryce Hegarty (2/2) 6', 13'; Cards: George Poolman (yellow card) 58' to 68'

Rugby Park, Invercargill
Referee: Angus Mabey (New Zealand)

19 March 2023
15:00 (GMT +10)

Reds	27–24	Drua
Try: Josh Flook (2) 11', 29'; Harry Wilson 42'; Suliasi Vunivalu 48'; Con: James O'Connor (2/4) 31', 49'; Pen: Tom Lynagh (1/1) 70'; Cards: Seru Uru (yellow card) 53' to 63'	Report	Try: Ratu Leone Rotuisolia 53'; Kalaveti Ravouvou 65'; Iosefo Masi 71'; Con: Frank Lomani (3/3) 54', 66', 72'; Pen: Frank Lomani (1/1) 7'; Cards: Kitione Salawa Jr. (yellow card) 21' to 31'

Suncorp Stadium, Brisbane
Referee: Reuben Keane (Australia)

== Round 5 ==
24 March 2023
19:05 (GMT +13)

Crusaders	35–17	Brumbies
Try: Leicester Fainga'anuku (2) 6', 58'; Braydon Ennor 18'; Codie Taylor 40+3'; Christian Lio-Willie 78'; Con: Richie Mo'unga (5/5) 7', 19', 40+5', 59', 79'	Report	Try: Ryan Lonergan 48'; Corey Toole 70'; Con: Ryan Lonergan (2/2) 49', 71'; Pen: Ryan Lonergan (1/1) 3'

Orangetheory Stadium, Christchurch
Referee: Brendon Pickerill (New Zealand)

24 March 2023
19:35 (GMT +11)

Waratahs	14–24	Chiefs
Try: Jake Gordon 17'; Michael Hooper 61'; Con: Ben Donaldson (2/2) 18', 62'	Report	Try: Bryn Gatland 4'; Emoni Narawa (2) 54', 76'; Con: Damian McKenzie (3/3) 5', 55', 77'; Pen: Damian McKenzie (1/2) 46'

Allianz Stadium, Sydney
Attendance: 14,046
Referee: Jordan Way (Australia)

25 March 2023
16:35 (GMT +13)

Highlanders	57–24	Drua
Try: Jermaine Ainsley 17'; Ethan de Groot 22'; Martín Bogado (2) 28', 73'; Sam Gilbert 30'; Mitch Hunt 40+1'; Aaron Smith 44'; Jonah Lowe 53'; Cam Millar 79'; Con: Sam Gilbert (5/8) 18', 23', 29', 31', 46'; Cam Millar (1/1) 80'; Cards: Connor Garden-Bachop (yellow card) 32' to 40'	Report	Try: Frank Lomani (2) 14', 76'; Taniela Rakuro 34'; Tevita Ikanivere 59'; Con: Kemu Valetini (1/2) 15'; Frank Lomani (1/2) 60'; Cards: Elia Canakaivata (yellow card) 80' to FT'

Forsyth Barr Stadium, Dunedin
Referee: Paul Williams (New Zealand)

25 March 2023
19:05 (GMT +13)

Moana Pasifika	0–59	Hurricanes
	Report	Try: Josh Moorby 8'; Brett Cameron 23'; Cam Roigard 29'; Kini Naholo 56'; Salesi Rayasi (2) 60', 66'; Ardie Savea 68'; Hame Faiva 76'; Peter Lakai 80'; Con: Brett Cameron (7/9) 9', 30', 57', 60', 67', 69', 77'

Mt Smart Stadium, Auckland
Referee: Reuben Keane (Australia)

25 March 2023
19:45 (GMT +11)

Rebels	40–34	Reds
Try: Ryan Louwrens 18'; Josh Kemeny 24'; Matt Gibbon 31'; Vaiolini Ekuasi 38'; Joe Pincus 57'; Angelo Smith 68'; Con: Carter Gordon (5/6) 19', 26', 33', 58', 69'	Report	Try: Josh Flook (2) 10', 54'; Jordan Petaia (2) 16', 45'; Ryan Smith 51'; Con: James O'Connor (3/5) 11', 17', 55'; Pen: James O'Connor (1/1) 66'

AAMI Park, Melbourne
Referee: Graham Cooper (Australia)

26 March 2023
15:35 (GMT +13)

Blues	30–17	Force
Try: Jacob Ratumaitavuki-Kneepkens 29'; Ofa Tuʻungafasi 32'; Mark Tele'a 48'; Ricky Riccitelli 61'; Con: Stephen Perofeta (2/4) 33', 63'; Pen: Stephen Perofeta (2/2) 5', 26'	Report	Try: Michael Wells 35'; Toni Pulu 57'; Zach Kibirige 77'; Con: Bayley Kuenzle (0/2); Hamish Stewart (1/1) 78'; Pen: Bayley Kuenzle (0/1)

Eden Park, Auckland
Attendance: 7,378
Referee: Ben O'Keeffe (New Zealand)

== Round 6 ==
31 March 2023
19:05 (GMT +13)

Moana Pasifika	17–45	Highlanders
Try: Solomone Funaki 6'; Levi Aumua 23'; Con: Lincoln McClutchie (2/2) 6', 23'; Pen: Lincoln McClutchie (1/2) 38'; Cards: Timoci Tavatavanawai (yellow card) 70' to FT'	Report	Try: Pari Pari Parkinson 9'; Sam Gilbert 17'; Hugh Renton 26'; Fetuli Paea 52'; Mosese Dawai 65'; Marino Mikaele-Tu'u 68'; Thomas Umaga-Jensen 79'; Con: Sam Gilbert (5/7) 18', 27', 53', 66', 69'

Mt Smart Stadium, Auckland
Referee: Ben O'Keeffe (New Zealand)

31 March 2023
18:35 (GMT +10)

Reds	12–25	Crusaders
Try: Tate McDermott 33'; Jordan Petaia 60'; Con: Isaac Henry (1/2) 33'; Pen: Isaac Henry (0/1)	Report	Try: Leicester Fainga'anuku 22'; Dominic Gardiner 30'; Willi Heinz 54'; Con: Richie Mo'unga (2/3) 22', 55'; Pen: Richie Mo'unga (2/2) 17', 65'

Suncorp Stadium, Brisbane
Attendance: 14,514
Referee: Damon Murphy (Australia)

1 April 2023
15:35 (GMT +12)

Drua	38–28	Rebels
Try: Ilaisa Droasese 2'; Selestino Ravutaumada 4'; Vilive Miramira 17'; Iosefo Masi 26'; Kitione Salawa Jr. 29'; Elia Canakaivata 59'; Con: Teti Tela (4/6) 3', 18', 27', 30'	Report	Try: Alex Mafi 22'; Andrew Kellaway 42'; Carter Gordon 67'; Pone Fa'amausili 79'; Con: Reece Hodge (4/4) 23', 43', 67', 79'

HFC Bank Stadium, Suva
Referee: James Doleman (New Zealand)

1 April 2023
19:05 (GMT +13)

Chiefs	20–13	Blues
Try: Emoni Narawa (2) 1', 26'; Con: Damian McKenzie (2/2) 2', 27'; Pen: Damian McKenzie (2/2) 12', 46'	Report	Try: Ricky Riccitelli 9'; Caleb Clarke 17'; Con: Beauden Barrett (0/2); Pen: Beauden Barrett (1/1) 51'

FMG Stadium Waikato, Hamilton
Referee: Angus Gardner (Australia)

1 April 2023
19:45 (GMT +11)

Brumbies	40–36	Waratahs
Try: Len Ikitau 24'; James Slipper (2) 39', 53'; Pete Samu 60'; Lachlan Lonergan 65'; Corey Toole 77'; Con: Noah Lolesio (3/3) 25', 40', 54'; Ryan Lonergan (2/3) 61', 66'	Report	Try: Dylan Pietsch 11'; Dave Porecki 18'; Jed Holloway 36'; Lalakai Foketi 50'; Mark Nawaqanitawase 55'; Con: Ben Donaldson (4/5) 13', 19', 37', 51'; Pen: Ben Donaldson (1/2) 73'; Cards: Harry Johnson-Holmes (yellow card) 28' to 38'; Daniel Botha (yellow card) 30' to 40'; Michael Hooper (yellow card) 65' to 75'

GIO Stadium, Canberra
Attendance: 10,575
Referee: Nic Berry (Australia)

2 April 2023
15:35 (GMT +12)

Hurricanes	45–42	Force
Try: Du'Plessis Kirifi 3'; Brayden Iose (2) 6', 32'; Dane Coles 20'; Bailyn Sullivan 48'; Kini Naholo 60'; Hame Faiva 67'; Con: Jordie Barrett (5/7) 4', 7', 33', 61', 68'	Report	Try: Jeremy Williams 10'; Gareth Simpson 58'; Zach Kibirige (2) 65', 80+6'; Siosifa Amone 72'; Jake Strachan 80'; Con: Gareth Simpson (3/3) 11', 59', 65'; Jake Strachan (3/3) 72', 80+1', 80+8'; Cards: Chase Tiatia (yellow card) 67' to 77'

Central Energy Trust Arena, Palmerston North
Referee: Paul Williams (New Zealand)

== Round 7 ==
7 April 2023
19:05 (GMT +12)

Crusaders	38–21	Moana Pasifika
Try: Codie Taylor (2) 12', 35'; Dominic Gardiner 52'; Dallas McLeod 62'; Willi Heinz 79'; Con: Richie Mo'unga (5/5) 13', 36', 53', 63', 80'; Pen: Richie Mo'unga (1/1) 5'; Cards: Corey Kellow (yellow card) 24' to 34'	Report	Try: Levi Aumua (2) 21', 25'; Timoci Tavatavanawai 38'; Con: Lincoln McClutchie (3/3) 22', 26', 40'; Cards: Michael Curry (yellow card) 46' to 56'

Orangetheory Stadium, Christchurch
Referee: James Doleman (New Zealand)

7 April 2023
19:35 (GMT +10)

Reds	24–52	Brumbies
Try: Matt Faessler 6'; Tate McDermott 24'; Fraser McReight 64'; Con: Isaac Henry (2/2) 7', 26'; Lawson Creighton (1/1) 65'; Pen: Isaac Henry (1/1) 39'; Cards: Angus Blyth (red card) 9'	Report	Try: Tom Wright 15'; Ben O'Donnell 32'; Lachlan Lonergan 40+2'; Len Ikitau 50'; Tamati Tua 60'; Rob Valetini 73'; Nick Frost 80+1'; Con: Noah Lolesio (6/6) 16', 33', 40+3', 51', 61', 74'; Ryan Lonergan (1/1) 80+2'; Pen: Noah Lolesio (1/1) 59'; Cards: Tom Wright (yellow card) 37' to 44'

Suncorp Stadium, Brisbane
Attendance: 9,702
Referee: Ben O'Keeffe (New Zealand)

8 April 2023
19:05 (GMT +12)

Highlanders	14–29	Hurricanes
Try: Hugh Renton 23'; Billy Harmon 76'; Con: Sam Gilbert (2/2) 25', 77'	Report	Try: Salesi Rayasi (2) 14', 65'; James Blackwell 49'; Cam Roigard 52'; Con: Jordie Barrett (3/4) 50', 53', 66'; Pen: Jordie Barrett (1/1) 37'

Forsyth Barr Stadium, Dunedin
Referee: Damon Murphy (Australia)

8 April 2023
19:45 (GMT +10)

Rebels	17–54	Blues
Try: Andrew Kellaway 26'; Brad Wilkin 40+1'; Con: Reece Hodge (2/2) 27', 40+2'; Pen: Reece Hodge (1/1) 9'; Cards: Cabous Eloff (yellow card) 70' to 80'	Report	Try: Sam Darry 12'; Ricky Riccitelli 34'; Finlay Christie (2) 47', 59'; Mark Tele'a (2) 50', 62'; Ofa Tuʻungafasi 65'; Zarn Sullivan 77'; Dalton Papalii 80+1'; Con: Beauden Barrett (3/9) 60', 66', 78'; Pen: Beauden Barrett (1/1) 29'; Cards: Mark Tele'a (yellow card) 37' to 45'

AAMI Park, Melbourne
Referee: Reuben Keane (Australia)

Bye/s: Chiefs, Drua, Force, Waratahs

== Round 8 ==
14 April 2023
17:05 (GMT +13)

Moana Pasifika	28–40	Reds
Try: Miracle Faiʻilagi (2) 13', 64'; Danny Toala 28'; Luteru Tolai 80'; Con: Lincoln McClutchie (2/2) 14', 30'; D'Angelo Leuila (2/2) 65', 80'	Report	Try: Fraser McReight 10'; Matt Faessler (2) 22', 47'; Harry Wilson 31'; Suliasi Vunivalu 36'; Lawson Creighton 55'; Con: Lawson Creighton (5/6) 11', 23', 32', 37', 56'

Apia Park, Apia
Referee: Brendon Pickerill (New Zealand)

14 April 2023
19:35 (GMT +10)

Brumbies	43–28	Drua
Try: Ben O'Donnell (3) 4', 13', 79'; Pete Samu 23'; Lachlan Lonergan 45'; Andy Muirhead 51'; Penalty try 73'; Con: Noah Lolesio (3/5); Jack Debreczeni (0/1); Cards: Darcy Swain (yellow card) 31' to 40'; Andy Muirhead (yellow card) 40' to 50'	Report	Try: Ratu Peni Matawalu 36'; Teti Tela 40+2'; Iosefo Masi 48'; Kalaveti Ravouvou 59'; Con: Teti Tela (4/4) 36', 40+3', 49', 60'; Cards: Joseva Tamani (yellow card) 73' to FT'

GIO Stadium, Canberra
Attendance: 8,188
Referee: Damon Murphy (Australia)

15 April 2023
14:35 (GMT +12) (Note: The match between the Hurricanes and the Chiefs was originally scheduled to start at 19:05 local time, however due to floodlight updates at Sky Stadium, Wellington, kickoff was moved forward to 14:35 local time.)

Hurricanes	17–33	Chiefs
Try: Devan Flanders 12'; Cam Roigard 29'; Con: Jordie Barrett (2/2) 13', 29'; Pen: Jordie Barrett (1/1) 20'		Try: Daniel Rona 9'; Pita Gus Sowakula 47'; Cortez Ratima 64'; Damian McKenzie 77'; Con: Damian McKenzie (2/4) 48', 65'; Pen: Damian McKenzie (3/4) 27', 60', 67'; Cards: Bryn Gatland (yellow card) 74' to FT'; Naitoa Ah Kuoi (yellow card) 80+1' to FT'

Sky Stadium, Wellington
Attendance: 16,203
Referee: Jordan Way (Australia)

15 April 2023
19:45 (GMT +10)

Waratahs	36–16	Force
Try: Izaia Perese (2) 16', 78'; Mark Nawaqanitawase 33'; Jake Gordon 39'; Harry Johnson-Holmes 53'; Con: Ben Donaldson (4/5) 17', 34', 54', 80'; Pen: Ben Donaldson (1/1) 9'; Cards: Will Harris (yellow card) 59' to 69'		Try: Manasa Mataele 59'; Zach Kibirige 71'; Con: Bayley Kuenzle (0/2); Pen: Jake Strachan (2/2) 20', 37'; Cards: Jackson Pugh (yellow card) 26' to 36'

Allianz Stadium, Sydney
Attendance: 10,157
Referee: Angus Gardner (Australia)

Bye/s: Blues, Crusaders, Highlanders, Rebels

== Round 9 ==
21 April 2023
19:05 (GMT +12)

Chiefs	50–17	Drua
Try: Cortez Ratima 3'; Shaun Stevenson 8'; Kaylum Boshier 20'; Damian McKenzie 27'; Samisoni Taukei'aho 38'; Brodie Retallick 71'; Tupou Vaa'i 74'; Etene Nanai-Seturo 80+1'; Con: Damian McKenzie (5/8) 4', 9', 40', 72', 80+2'; Pen: Damian McKenzie (0/1); Cards: Etene Nanai-Seturo (yellow card) 36' to 46'	Report	Try: Elia Canakaivata 17'; Michael Naitokani 37'; Ilaisa Droasese 46'; Con: Teti Tela (1/3) 17'; Cards: Apisalome Vota (yellow card) 20' to 30'; Haereiti Hetet (yellow card) 52' to 62'

FMG Stadium Waikato, Hamilton
Attendance: 11,142
Referee: Brendon Pickerill (New Zealand)

21 April 2023
19:35 (GMT +10)

Rebels	27–43	Crusaders
Try: Brad Wilkin 15'; Vaiolini Ekuasi 18'; Ryan Louwrens 26'; Con: Reece Hodge (3/3) 16', 19', 27'; Pen: Reece Hodge (2/2) 30', 68'; Cards: Vaiolini Ekuasi (yellow card) 61' to 71'	Report	Try: Macca Springer 12'; David Havili (2) 21', 55'; Cullen Grace 62'; Ioane Moananu 70'; Dallas McLeod 80+2'; Con: Richie Mo'unga (5/6) 14', 56', 63', 71', 80+3'; Pen: Richie Mo'unga (1/1) 77'

AAMI Park, Melbourne
Referee: Ben O'Keeffe (New Zealand)

22 April 2023
19:05 (GMT +12)

Blues	55–21	Waratahs
Try: Ricky Riccitelli (2) 12', 51'; Zarn Sullivan (2) 38', 45'; Caleb Clarke 56'; Sam Darry 64'; Cameron Suafoa 75'; Con: Stephen Perofeta (1/1) 13'; Beauden Barrett (6/6) 39', 45', 52', 57', 65', 77'; Pen: Stephen Perofeta (2/2) 5', 21'	Report	Try: Mahe Vailanu 29'; Dylan Pietsch 61'; Teddy Wilson 73'; Con: Ben Donaldson (2/2) 30', 61'; Jack Bowen (1/1) 74'; Cards: Mahe Vailanu (yellow card) 37' to 47'

Eden Park, Auckland
Attendance: 9,497
Referee: Paul Williams (New Zealand)

22 April 2023
17:45 (GMT +8)

Force	30–17	Highlanders
Try: Bryce Hegarty 5'; Manasa Mataele 31'; Penalty try 38'; Con: Bryce Hegarty (2/2) 6', 32'; Pen: Bryce Hegarty (3/3) 13', 62', 77'; Cards: Hamish Stewart (yellow card) 39' to 49'; Tom Horton (yellow card) 51' to 61'	Report	Try: Connor Garden-Bachop 44'; Andrew Makalio 56'; Con: Sam Gilbert (2/2) 45', 57'; Pen: Sam Gilbert (1/1) 16'; Cards: Pari Pari Parkinson (yellow card) 20' to 30'; Ethan de Groot (yellow card) 21' to 31'; Marino Mikaele-Tu'u (yellow card) 38' to 48'

HBF Park, Perth
Attendance: 8,293
Referee: Nic Berry (Australia)

Bye/s: Brumbies, Hurricanes, Moana Pasifika, Reds

== Round 10 ==
28 April 2023
19:05 (GMT +12)

Hurricanes	32–27	Brumbies
Try: Devan Flanders 10'; Ardie Savea 14'; Cam Roigard 46'; Aidan Morgan 69'; Con: Jordie Barrett (3/4) 11', 15', 70'; Pen: Jordie Barrett (2/3) 40+1', 63'	Report	Try: Nick Frost (2) 6', 27'; Rory Scott 55'; Corey Toole 77'; Con: Noah Lolesio (2/2) 7', 28'; Ryan Lonergan (0/2); Pen: Ryan Lonergan (1/1) 80+2'

Sky Stadium, Wellington
Attendance: 8,665
Referee: James Doleman (New Zealand)

28 April 2023
19:35 (GMT +10)

Waratahs	21–20	Highlanders
Try: Izaia Perese 17'; Lalakai Foketi 39'; Mahe Vailanu 78'; Con: Ben Donaldson (3/3) 18', 40+1', 80'; Pen: Ben Donaldson (0/1); Cards: Lalakai Foketi (yellow card) 61' to 71'	Report	Try: Hugh Renton 57'; Aaron Smith 62'; Con: Sam Gilbert (2/2) 58', 62'; Pen: Sam Gilbert (2/2) 22', 26'; Cards: Pari Pari Parkinson (yellow card) 75' to FT'

Allianz Stadium, Sydney
Attendance: 10,351
Referee: Damon Murphy (Australia)

29 April 2023
14:05 (GMT +12)

Drua	14–30	Blues
Try: Elia Canakaivata (2) 34', 67'; Con: Teti Tela (1/1) 35'; Kemu Valetini (1/1) 68'	Report	Try: Rieko Ioane 28'; Cameron Suafoa 39'; Dalton Papalii 49'; Con: Beauden Barrett (3/3) 29', 40+1', 51'; Pen: Beauden Barrett (2/2) 25', 72'; Harry Plummer (1/1) 33'

Churchill Park, Lautoka
Referee: Ben O'Keeffe (New Zealand)

29 April 2023
16:35 (GMT +12)

Moana Pasifika	33–43	Rebels
Try: Neria Fomai 27'; Levi Aumua 56'; Solomone Funaki 61'; Fine Inisi (2) 73', 80'; Con: Christian Lealiifano (0/1); Lincoln McClutchie (4/4) 57', 62', 74', 80'; Cards: Miracle Faiʻilagi (yellow card) 13' to 23'; Isi Tuʻungafasi (yellow card) 32' to 40'; Ezekiel Lindenmuth (yellow card) 41' to 51'	Rebels	Try: Lachie Anderson 14'; Josh Kemeny 18'; Carter Gordon 35'; David Feliuai 40+2'; Alex Mafi (2) 49', 59'; Monty Ioane 80+1'; Con: Reece Hodge (4/7) 15', 36', 40+2', 50'; Cards: Jordan Uelese (yellow card) 73' to FT'

Mt Smart Stadium, Auckland
Referee: Angus Mabey (New Zealand)

29 April 2023
19:05 (GMT +12)

Chiefs	34–24	Crusaders
Try: Brodie Retallick 45'; Shaun Stevenson 73'; Tyrone Thompson 79'; Con: Damian McKenzie (2/3) 46', 80+1'; Pen: Damian McKenzie (5/6) 7', 18', 31', 40+2', 69'; Cards: Luke Jacobson (yellow card) 53' to 63'	Report	Try: Tamaiti Williams 5'; Penalty try 53'; Fergus Burke 62'; Con: Richie Mo'unga (2/2) 6', 63'; Pen: Richie Mo'unga (1/3) 71'

FMG Stadium Waikato, Hamilton
Attendance: 23,500
Referee: Angus Gardner (Australia)

29 April 2023
19:45 (GMT +10)

Reds	31–17	Force
Try: Fraser McReight (2) 17', 24'; Matt Faessler 32'; George Blake 65'; Con: Lawson Creighton (3/3) 18', 25', 33'; Tom Lynagh (1/1) 66'; Pen: Tom Lynagh (1/1) 79'	Report	Try: Zach Kibirige (2) 7', 73'; Michael Wells 54'; Con: Bryce Hegarty (0/2); Ian Prior (1/1) 74'

Suncorp Stadium, Brisbane
Referee: Reuben Keane (Australia)

== Round 11 ==
5 May 2023
19:05 (GMT +12)

Highlanders	28–52	Chiefs
Try: Ethan de Groot 7'; Aaron Smith 35'; Sam Gilbert 49'; Shannon Frizell 76'; Con: Sam Gilbert (4/4) 8', 36', 50', 77'	Report	Try: Emoni Narawa 20'; Shaun Stevenson 24'; Anton Lienert-Brown 28'; George Dyer 39'; Daniel Rona (2) 41', 60'; Brad Weber 67'; Con: Damian McKenzie (7/7) 21', 25', 30', 40', 43', 61', 69'; Pen: Damian McKenzie (1/1) 54'; Cards: Ollie Norris (yellow card) 80' to FT'

Forsyth Barr Stadium, Dunedin
Referee: Ben O'Keeffe (New Zealand)

6 May 2023
14:05 (GMT +12)

Drua	27–24	Hurricanes
Try: Taniela Rakuro (2) 18', 46'; Meli Derenalagi 59'; Con: Frank Lomani (2/2) 19', 47'; Kemu Valetini (1/1) 60'; Pen: Frank Lomani (0/2); Kemu Valetini (2/2) 75', 79'	Report	Try: Julian Savea (2) 30', 43'; Xavier Numia 51'; Du'Plessis Kirifi 57'; Con: Jordie Barrett (2/4) 51', 57'; Cards: Isaia Walker-Leawere (yellow card) 33' to 43' (red card) 77'

HFC Bank Stadium, Suva
Referee: Jordan Way (Australia)

6 May 2023
16:35 (GMT +12)

Crusaders	48–13	Force
Try: Brodie McAlister (3) 8', 21', 42'; Leicester Fainga'anuku (2) 25', 48'; Macca Springer (2) 40', 55'; Codie Taylor 63'; Con: Richie Mo'unga (4/8) 26', 40+1', 49', 64'	Report	Try: Jackson Pugh 68'; Con: Max Burey (1/1) 69'; Pen: Max Burey (2/2) 4', 17'

Orangetheory Stadium, Christchurch
Referee: Brendon Pickerill (New Zealand)

6 May 2023
19:05 (GMT +12)

Blues	31–30	Moana Pasifika
Try: Akira Ioane 20'; Kurt Eklund 26'; Caleb Clarke 30'; Sam Darry 58'; Penalty try 80+2'; Con: Harry Plummer (1/3) 30'; Zarn Sullivan (1/1) 59'; Pen: Harry Plummer (0/1); Cards: Marcel Renata (yellow card) 47' to 57'		Try: Timoci Tavatavanawai 36'; Abraham Pole 40+1'; Christian Lealiifano 47'; Fine Inisi 68'; Con: Christian Lealiifano (2/3) 37', 48'; D'Angelo Leuila (0/1); Pen: Christian Lealiifano (1/2) 13'; D'Angelo Leuila (1/1) 63'; Drop: D'Angelo Leuila (0/1); Cards: Solomone Funaki (yellow card) 77' to FT'; Michael Curry (yellow card) 80+1' to FT'

Eden Park, Auckland
Attendance: 8,033
Referee: Graham Cooper (Australia)

6 May 2023
19:45 (GMT +10)

Reds	24–32	Waratahs
Try: Matt Faessler 13'; Suliasi Vunivalu 34'; Peni Ravai 80+1'; Con: Lawson Creighton (3/3) 14', 35', 80+2'; Pen: Lawson Creighton (1/1) 25'	Report	Try: Dave Porecki 6'; Taleni Seu 16'; Lalakai Foketi 45'; Harry Johnson-Holmes 58'; Con: Ben Donaldson (3/4) 8', 18', 46'; Pen: Ben Donaldson (2/2) 40+3', 77'

Queensland Country Bank Stadium, Townsville
Attendance: 5,942
Referee: Angus Gardner (Australia)

7 May 2023
14:35 (GMT +10)

Rebels	26–33	Brumbies
Try: Josh Kemeny 3'; Lachie Anderson (2) 22', 55'; Carter Gordon 71'; Con: Reece Hodge (3/4) 4', 23', 72'	Report	Try: Noah Lolesio (2) 8', 20'; Jahrome Brown (2) 33', 49'; Rob Valetini 63'; Con: Noah Lolesio (3/4) 9', 21', 35'; Ryan Lonergan (1/1) 64'; Cards: Darcy Swain (yellow card) 76' to FT'

AAMI Park, Melbourne
Referee: James Doleman (New Zealand)

== Round 12 ==
12 May 2023
19:05 (GMT +12)

Chiefs	22–25	Reds
Try: Etene Nanai-Seturo (2) 6', 37'; Samipeni Finau 73'; Con: Damian McKenzie (2/3) 38', 73'; Pen: Damian McKenzie (1/1) 47'	Report	Try: George Blake 11'; Tate McDermott 40+1'; Jock Campbell 44'; Zane Nonggorr 56'; Con: Lawson Creighton (1/2) 40+2'; Tom Lynagh (0/2); Pen: Tom Lynagh (1/1) 78'

Yarrow Stadium, New Plymouth
Referee: Paul Williams (New Zealand)

12 May 2023
17:35 (GMT +8)

Force	34–14	Drua
Try: Manasa Mataele 4'; Folau Fainga'a (2) 9', 64'; Jeremy Williams 42'; Carlo Tizzano 75'; Con: Max Burey (3/5) 11', 43', 66'; Pen: Max Burey (1/1) 40+3'	Report	Try: Eroni Sau 15'; Te Ahiwaru Cirikidaveta 33'; Con: Frank Lomani (2/2) 16', 33'; Pen: Frank Lomani (0/1)

HBF Park, Perth
Referee: Angus Gardner (Australia)

13 May 2023
16:35 (GMT +12)

Hurricanes	71–22	Moana Pasifika
Try: Billy Proctor 2'; Jordie Barrett 8'; Aidan Morgan 14'; Kini Naholo (2) 19', 28'; Ardie Savea (3) 44', 72', 77'; Jacob Devery 50'; Salesi Rayasi 59'; Caleb Delany 66'; Con: Jordie Barrett (8/11) 3', 9', 45', 50', 60', 67', 73', 78'	Report	Try: Henry Taefu 5'; Anzelo Tuitavuki 25'; Danny Toala 38'; Con: Lincoln McClutchie (2/3) 6', 39'; Pen: Lincoln McClutchie (1/1) 42'

Sky Stadium, Wellington
Attendance: 7,933
Referee: Brendon Pickerill (New Zealand)

13 May 2023
19:05 (GMT +12)

Crusaders	15–3	Blues
Try: Quinten Strange 30'; Leicester Fainga'anuku 43'; Con: Richie Mo'unga (1/1) 31'; Pen: Richie Mo'unga (1/1) 39'	Report	Pen: Beauden Barrett (1/1) 34'; Cards: Dalton Papalii (red card) 43'

Orangetheory Stadium, Christchurch
Referee: Nic Berry (Australia)

13 May 2023
19:45 (GMT +10)

Waratahs	38–20	Rebels
Try: Penalty try (2) 21', 45'; Jake Gordon 23'; Mark Nawaqanitawase 53'; Izaia Perese 79'; Con: Ben Donaldson (3/3) 25', 54', 80'; Pen: Ben Donaldson (1/1) 67'	Report	Try: Reece Hodge 9'; Monty Ioane 13'; Con: Reece Hodge (2/2) 10', 15'; Pen: Reece Hodge (2/2) 40+1', 50'; Cards: Brad Wilkin (yellow card) 21' to 31'; Josh Canham (yellow card) 46' to 56'

Allianz Stadium, Sydney
Attendance: 10,322
Referee: Damon Murphy (Australia)

14 May 2023
14:35 (GMT +10)

Brumbies	48–32	Highlanders
Try: Len Ikitau 14'; Jahrome Brown 22'; Darcy Swain 30'; Corey Toole (2) 50', 66'; Pete Samu (2) 62', 78'; Con: Noah Lolesio (5/7) 23', 32', 51', 67', 80'; Pen: Noah Lolesio (1/1) 71'; Cards: Luke Reimer (yellow card) 60' to 70'	Report	Try: Jona Nareki 19'; Daniel Lienert-Brown 27'; Thomas Umaga-Jensen 47'; Folau Fakatava 60'; Con: Freddie Burns (3/4) 20', 28', 60'; Pen: Freddie Burns (2/2) 12', 40+1'

GIO Stadium, Canberra
Referee: Graham Cooper (Australia)

== Round 13 ==
19 May 2023
19:05 (GMT +12)

Moana Pasifika	7–41	Crusaders
Try: Tima Fainga'anuku 53'; Con: Christian Lealiifano (1/1) 54'		Try: Christian Lio-Willie 10'; Macca Springer 20'; Will Jordan 35'; Noah Hotham 38'; Brodie McAlister 46'; Scott Barrett 67'; Con: Fergus Burke (4/6) 11', 36', 39', 68'; Pen: Fergus Burke (1/1) 19'

Mt Smart Stadium, Auckland
Referee: Reuben Keane (Australia)

19 May 2023
19:35 (GMT +10)

Reds	26–45	Blues
Try: Josh Flook 24'; Sef Fa'agase 40'; Harry Wilson 70'; Jock Campbell 78'; Con: Lawson Creighton (2/3) 25', 40+1'; Tom Lynagh (1/1) 79'	Report	Try: Zarn Sullivan 20'; Beauden Barrett 28'; Patrick Tuipulotu 47'; Jacob Ratumaitavuki-Kneepkens 62'; Mark Tele'a 73'; Taufa Funaki 80'; Con: Beauden Barrett (2/2) 21', 30'; Harry Plummer (4/4) 48', 63', 74', 80'; Pen: Beauden Barrett (1/1) 18'; Cards: James Tucker (yellow card) 70' to FT'

Suncorp Stadium, Brisbane
Referee: Jordan Way (Australia)

20 May 2023
16:35 (GMT +12)

Highlanders	20–17	Rebels
Try: Connor Garden-Bachop 14'; Ethan de Groot 31'; Con: Sam Gilbert (2/2) 15', 32'; Pen: Sam Gilbert (2/2) 72', 80+5'	Report	Try: Richard Hardwick 22'; Stacey Ili 56'; Con: Reece Hodge (2/2) 23', 57'; Pen: Reece Hodge (1/1) 61'; Cards: Jordan Uelese (yellow card) 71' to 80+1'

Forsyth Barr Stadium, Dunedin
Referee: Paul Williams (New Zealand)

20 May 2023
19:05 (GMT +12)

Chiefs	23–12	Hurricanes
Try: Samisoni Taukei'aho 6'; Tupou Vaa'i (2) 22', 48'; Con: Damian McKenzie (1/3) 48'; Pen: Damian McKenzie (2/2) 66', 71'		Try: Josh Moorby 58'; Brayden Iose 68'; Con: Aidan Morgan (1/2) 69'

FMG Stadium Waikato, Hamilton
Referee: James Doleman (New Zealand)

20 May 2023
19:45 (GMT +10)

Waratahs	32–18	Drua
Try: Mark Nawaqanitawase (2) 11', 64'; Dylan Pietsch 40+4'; Langi Gleeson 71'; Mahe Vailanu 78'; Con: Ben Donaldson (2/5) 66', 79'; Pen: Ben Donaldson (1/1) 27'		Try: Tevita Ikanivere 59'; Joseva Tamani 68'; Con: Kemu Valetini (1/1) 60'; Caleb Muntz (0/1); Pen: Caleb Muntz (2/2) 8', 15'

Allianz Stadium, Sydney
Attendance: 14,562
Referee: Ben O'Keeffe (New Zealand)

20 May 2023
20:00 (GMT +8)

Force	34–19	Brumbies
Try: Felix Kalapu 8'; Hamish Stewart 17'; Sam Spink 25'; Marley Pearce 70'; Con: Max Burey (4/4) 9', 18', 26', 72'; Pen: Max Burey (2/2) 46', 74'	Report	Try: Charlie Cale 28'; Darcy Swain 35'; Luke Reimer 53'; Con: Ryan Lonergan (2/3) 29', 54'; Cards: Jack Debreczeni (yellow card) 16' to 26'

HBF Park, Perth
Referee: Damon Murphy (Australia)

== Round 14 ==
26 May 2023
19:05 (GMT +12)

Highlanders	35–30	Reds
Try: Jona Nareki 17'; Hugh Renton 27'; Saula Ma'u 61'; Connor Garden-Bachop 69'; Folau Fakatava 80'; Con: Sam Gilbert (4/4) 18', 28', 62', 71'; Freddie Burns (1/1) 80+1'	Report	Try: Liam Wright 8'; Jake Upfield 12'; Suliasi Vunivalu 40+1'; Con: Tom Lynagh (3/3) 9', 13', 40+1'; Pen: Tom Lynagh (3/3) 46', 59', 75'

Forsyth Barr Stadium, Dunedin
Attendance: 14,200
Referee: Brendon Pickerill (New Zealand)

26 May 2023
19:35 (GMT +10)

Rebels	52–14	Force
Try: Ryan Louwrens 11'; Brad Wilkin 19'; Sam Talakai 34'; Josh Kemeny 48'; Richard Hardwick 57'; Lachie Anderson 68'; Nick Jooste 74'; Vaiolini Ekuasi 77'; Con: Reece Hodge (6/8) 20', 35', 58', 70', 75', 78'	Report	Try: Sam Spink (2) 5', 60'; Con: Max Burey (2/2) 6', 61'

AAMI Park, Melbourne
Referee: Dan Waenga (New Zealand)

27 May 2023
14:05 (GMT +12)

Drua	47–46	Moana Pasifika
Try: Meli Derenalagi 9'; Iosefo Masi (3) 13', 53', 56'; Ilaisa Droasese (2) 16', 45'; Eroni Sau 32'; Con: Frank Lomani (6/7) 10', 14', 18', 46', 54', 56'; Cards: Emosi Tuqiri (yellow card) 79' to FT'	Report	Try: William Havili (2) 5', 28'; Ezekiel Lindenmuth 24'; Levi Aumua 34'; Abraham Pole 59'; Christian Lealiifano 67'; Sam Moli 80'; Con: Christian Lealiifano (4/7) 6', 29', 61', 68'; Pen: Christian Lealiifano (1/1) 42'

Churchill Park, Lautoka
Referee: Jordan Way (Australia)

27 May 2023
16:35 (GMT +12)

Crusaders	42–18	Waratahs
Try: David Havili 9'; Codie Taylor 21'; Mitchell Drummond 27'; Fergus Burke 37'; Richie Mo'unga 59'; Sione Havili Talitui 78'; Con: Richie Mo'unga (6/6) 10', 22', 29', 38', 60', 80'; Cards: Leicester Fainga'anuku (yellow card) 13' to 23'	Report	Try: Jake Gordon 14'; Dylan Pietsch 56'; Nephi Leatigaga 75'; Con: Ben Donaldson (0/2); Tane Edmed (0/1); Pen: Ben Donaldson (1/1) 7'; Cards: Joey Walton (yellow card) 35' to 45'

Orangetheory Stadium, Christchurch
Attendance: 10,813
Referee: James Doleman (New Zealand)

27 May 2023
19:05 (GMT +12)

Blues	36–25	Hurricanes
Try: Mark Tele'a (4) 11', 28', 64', 79'; Hoskins Sotutu 20'; Rieko Ioane 74'; Con: Harry Plummer (2/3) 13', 29'; Stephen Perofeta (1/3) 75'	Report	Try: Cam Roigard 32'; Billy Proctor 50'; Kini Naholo (2) 71', 77'; Con: Jordie Barrett (1/3) 33'; Brett Cameron (0/1); Pen: Jordie Barrett (1/3) 5'

Eden Park, Auckland
Attendance: 16,853
Referee: Angus Gardner (Australia)

27 May 2023
19:45 (GMT +10)

Brumbies	21–31	Chiefs
Try: Len Ikitau 12'; Corey Toole 69'; Pete Samu 80+2'; Con: Noah Lolesio (1/1) 13'; Jack Debreczeni (2/2) 70', 80+2'; Cards: Allan Alaalatoa (yellow card) 18' to 28'		Try: Luke Jacobson 3'; Josh Ioane 32'; Cortez Ratima 55'; Shaun Stevenson 60'; Con: Damian McKenzie (4/4) 5', 34', 56', 61'; Pen: Damian McKenzie (1/1) 23'

GIO Stadium, Canberra
Referee: Nic Berry (Australia)

== Round 15 ==
2 June 2023
19:05 (GMT +12)

Blues	16–9	Highlanders
Try: Patrick Tuipulotu 29'; Con: Harry Plummer (1/1) 30'; Pen: Harry Plummer (3/3) 8', 25', 40+1'	Report	Pen: Sam Gilbert (3/4) 2', 9', 79'; Cards: Jermaine Ainsley (yellow card) 58' to 68'

Eden Park, Auckland
Attendance: 11,270
Referee: Ben O'Keeffe (New Zealand)

2 June 2023
19:35 (GMT +10)

Brumbies	33–17	Rebels
Try: Corey Toole 15'; Connal McInerney 34'; Tom Wright 46'; Ollie Sapsford 52'; Andy Muirhead 79'; Con: Jack Debreczeni (4/4) 16', 35', 47', 53'; Jesse Mogg (0/1)	Report	Try: Carter Gordon 28'; Brad Wilkin 76'; Con: Reece Hodge (2/2) 29', 76'; Pen: Reece Hodge (1/1) 24'; Cards: Reece Hodge (yellow card) 32' to 42'

GIO Stadium, Canberra
Referee: Angus Gardner (Australia)

3 June 2023
16:35 (GMT +12)

Drua	41–17	Reds
Try: Selestino Ravutaumada 4'; Kalaveti Ravouvou 18'; Vilive Miramira 32'; Mesake Doge 51'; Tevita Ikanivere 59'; Joseva Tamani 74'; Con: Caleb Muntz (1/3) 6'; Frank Lomani (2/2) 53', 60'; Kemu Valetini (1/1) 76'; Pen: Frank Lomani (1/2) 44'	Report	Try: Ryan Smith 8'; Fraser McReight 22'; Con: James O'Connor (2/2) 9', 23'; Pen: James O'Connor (1/1) 28'; Cards: Fraser McReight (yellow card) 47' to 57'

HFC Bank Stadium, Suva
Referee: Paul Williams (New Zealand)

3 June 2023
19:05 (GMT +12)

Hurricanes	27–26	Crusaders
Try: Billy Proctor 39'; Cam Roigard 59'; Josh Moorby 68'; Brayden Iose 73'; Con: Jordie Barrett (0/1); Brett Cameron (2/3) 60', 70'; Pen: Jordie Barrett (1/1) 27'; Cards: Brayden Iose (yellow card) 19' to 29'	Report	Try: Leicester Fainga'anuku 3'; Codie Taylor 20'; Braydon Ennor 30'; Chay Fihaki 80+1'; Con: Richie Mo'unga (3/4) 22', 31', 80+3'; Cards: Codie Taylor (yellow card) 53' to 63'

Sky Stadium, Wellington
Attendance: 16,744
Referee: Brendon Pickerill (New Zealand)

3 June 2023
19:45 (GMT +10)

Waratahs	24–33	Moana Pasifika
Try: Mark Nawaqanitawase 5'; Ned Hanigan 38'; Tolu Latu 73'; Michael Hooper 80+1'; Con: Ben Donaldson (2/4) 6', 39'	Report	Try: Timoci Tavatavanawai (2), 14', 32'; Miracle Faiʻilagi (2) 20', 66'; Christian Lealiifano 61'; Con: Christian Lealiifano (4/5) 15', 22', 33', 63'

Allianz Stadium, Sydney
Attendance: 19,219
Referee: Graham Cooper (Australia)

3 June 2023
20:00 (GMT +8)

Force	19–43	Chiefs
Try: Carlo Tizzano 29'; Tim Anstee 56'; Max Burey 75'; Con: Max Burey (2/3) 30', 57'	Report	Try: Laghlan McWhannell 8'; Anton Lienert-Brown 16'; Liam Coombes-Fabling 20'; Samipeni Finau 34'; Te Toiroa Tahuriorangi 48'; Pita Gus Sowakula 65'; Con: Rameka Poihipi (5/6) 9', 21', 35', 49', 66'; Pen: Rameka Poihipi (1/1) 40'

HBF Park, Perth
Referee: Nic Berry (Australia)

== See also ==
- 2023 Super Rugby Pacific season
