= Tane Edmed =

Australian rugby union player (born 2000)

- Born: 16 August 2000 (age 26) Sydney, New South Wales, Australia
- Height: 183 cm (6 ft 0 in)
- Weight: 91 kg (201 lb; 14 st 5 lb)
- School: Trinity Grammar School
- Notable relative: Steve Edmed (father)

Rugby union career
- Position: Fly-half
- Current team: ACT Brumbies
Youth career
- West Harbour
- –2018: Trinity Grammar School
- 2020–2021: Waratahs Academy
Amateur team(s)
Years	Team	Apps	(Points)
–2019	Randwick		
2020–	Eastwood	36	(339)
Senior career
Years	Team	Apps	(Points)
2019	Sydney	1	(6)
2021–2025	Waratahs	52	(254)
2024	North Harbour	10	(137)
2026–	ACT Brumbies	13	(32)
- Correct as of 5 June 2026
International career
Years	Team	Apps	(Points)
2022	Australia A	4	(2)
2024–	Australia	9	(25)
2025	ANZAC XV	1	(0)
- Correct as of 11 May 2026

Tane Edmed (born 16 August 2000) is an Australian rugby union player who plays for the ACT Brumbies in the Super Rugby. His playing position is fly-half. He was named in the Waratahs squad for the 2021 Super Rugby AU season, where he made his Super Rugby debut. He previously represented the Sydney in the 2019 National Rugby Championship.

== Early life and youth career ==
Edmed was born in Sydney, New South Wales, Australia in 2000. His father, Steve Edmed, was a former professional rugby league player who played over 150 games for the Balmain Tigers in the New South Wales Rugby League (NSWRL). Edmed played junior rugby union for West Harbour in Sydney's Inner West and junior rugby league for the Leichhardt Wanderers and Wests Tigers.

He was educated at Sydney's Trinity Grammar School where he would represent the school while playing for the Combined Associated Schools (CAS) 1st XV. Edmed was then selected for the Australian Schools Barbarians in October 2018, playing fly-half against New Zealand Schoolboys. In 2020, while playing colts rugby (youth) for Randwick, Edmed decided to make a move over to Eastwood in hopes of playing at a higher level. Edmed commented to Behind The Ruck, "I couldn't be more thankful for the opportunity and development Randwick gave me, but the move to Eastwood was purely opportunity based. Randwick had a lot of playmakers coming back into first grade, and I felt like a move to Eastwood would increase my chances of potentially playing in the Shute Shield. In saying that, Ben Batger made it very clear that a first grade spot wasn't guaranteed and that I would have to work for it."

== Career ==
=== Waratahs ===
Coming through the Waratahs Academy, Edmed signed his first professional contract (two-year deal) with the Waratahs in 2020 ahead of the 2021 Super Rugby AU season. Edmed had moved from Shute Shield clubs Randwick to Eastwood that year, whilst training with the senior Waratahs squad part-time. Edmed had already been exposed to professional rugby with Sydney in the National Rugby Championship (NRC), however issues around the COVID-19 pandemic forced the closure of the competition.

Edmed made his Super Rugby debut in Round 1 (19 February 2021) against arch-rivals the Queensland Reds at Lang Park, Brisbane. Edmed came on as a substitute in the 55th minute. The Waratahs lost 41–7. For the rest of the season, Edmed saw few minutes of game-time, all coming as a substitute. The Waratahs went winless for the 2021 Super Rugby AU season, recording an 0–13 record.

After making two appearances off the bench for the Waratahs in the opening rounds of the inaugural Super Rugby Pacific season (2022), Edmed was named starting fly-half in their Round 6 clash against the Queensland Reds, replacing first-choice fly-half Ben Donaldson who suffered an ankle injury in the previous round. Impressing with his mature game management and form, Edmed started again at No. 10 in the following rounds before being made the starting fly-half for the rest of the season after rotational fly-half Will Harrison suffered a severe knee injury. Edmed's consistent performances were so impressive that rumours emerged suggesting he had attracted the attention of Perth-based Super Rugby rivals, the Western Force, particularly amid comments that the Waratahs possessed an excess of fly-halves and Edmed's contract expiry at the end of the season. Edmed racked-up 76 points for the Waratahs, including one try. The Waratahs finished in the Quarter-finals under new head coach Darren Coleman. In May 2022, it was revealed that Edmed had signed a new two-year deal with the Waratahs.

Edmed began the 2023 Super Rugby Pacific season following his promising 2022 campaign, where he had emerged as a key player at fly-half. Edmed played at the first-choice Waratahs' first-choice fly-half for the opening three rounds of the season, scoring 40 points in the process, including one try. However, his 2023 campaign was significantly disrupted after Round 4 by a back injury, which sidelined him for 10 weeks during the early rounds of the competition. As a result, Edmed played just three more matches during the season, or seven in total.

In 2024, Edmed played 10 out of 13 games Super Rugby games as the starting fly-half in a very unsuccessful Waratahs season. The Waratahs, who finished wooden-spooners, swapped Edmed with Will Harrison toward the latter end of the season. In an effort to regain full match fitness and experience a different playing environment, Edmed joined North Harbour in New Zealand's Bunnings National Provincial Championship (NPC).

His performances across the campaign were widely regarded as a breakthrough. Over 10 matches, Edmed scored 137 points, making him the leading point-scorer of the entire 2024 Bunnings NPC season. His average of 13.7 points per game included a record performance against Manawatu, where he recorded 33 points (most for the club by a player in a match) through two tries, three penalties, and seven conversions — one of the most prolific individual performances of the tournament. Despite North Harbour finishing 10th overall with only three wins, Edmed's attacking output and tactical control were considered a highlight of their campaign. His form in New Zealand earned him a call-up to the Australia national team. In August 2024, Edmed re-signed with the Waratahs for 2025.

In 2025, Edmed operated primarily in a secondary role to Lawson Creighton in the Waratahs' No. 10 jersey. Despite serving as the team's chief goal-kicker and finishing the season as leading point-scorer, he was limited to just five starts across thirteen matches. Despite the team's improvement from the previous season under new head coach Dan McKellar, the Waratahs finished 8th and subsequently missed finals.

=== ACT Brumbies ===
In July 2025, the ACT Brumbies announced they had signed Edmed, who was in the final year of his contract with the Waratahs, on a two-year deal, beginning in 2026.

On 14 February 2026, Edmed made his Brumbies debut in their round 1, 56-24 win over the Western Force in Perth.

== International career ==
In October 2022, Edmed was called-up to the Australia A team for their Pacific Nations Cup and 2022 tour of Japan. Edmed's inclusion was designed to provide game time to emerging fly-halves (including Ben Donaldson) and to assess his readiness for elevation to the Wallabies. Edmed played in four matches across the campaign, and slotted a game-winning conversion against Japan XV in Fukuoka.

In October 2024, Edmed was invited into Wallabies training for the Spring Tour, considered for inclusion in either the Wallabies or Australia XV squads. Edmed was named on the bench for Australia's match against Ireland on 30 November. He made his international test debut on 30 November 2024 after coming on as a 73rd minute substitute. However, after just three minutes on the pitch Edmed was subbed off with a knock to the head, which required a head injury assessment (HIA). Australia lost 19–22 against Ireland at the Aviva Stadium, Dublin.

In July 2025, featured as the ANZAC XV fly-half against the British & Irish Lions in Adelaide on their 2025 tour of Australia. The Lions won 0–48. The following month Edmed was one of 34 players named in coach Joe Schmidt's Wallabies squad for their opening two tests against South Africa in the 2025 Rugby Championship. Ahead of the first test, Wallabies coach Joe Schmidt made a late reversal on the starting lineup by calling up Edmed onto the bench as back-up for James O'Connor after Ben Donaldson suffered an injury, replacing back-rower Nick Champion de Crespigny in the squad to avoid going into the Springboks Test without a second playmaker.
