= Vailanu =

Vailanu is a surname. Notable people with the surname include:

- Mahe Vailanu (born 1997), Tongan Australian rugby union player
- Sione Vailanu (born 1995), Tongan rugby union player
