= Jack Bowen (rugby union) =

Australian rugby union player (born 2003)

- Born: 30 December 2003 (age 22) Sydney, New South Wales, Australia
- Height: 178 cm (5 ft 10 in)
- Weight: 90 kg (198 lb; 14 st 2 lb)
- School: Saint Ignatius' College, Riverview
- Notable relatives: Scott Bowen (father); Tony Roche (grandfather)

Rugby union career
- Position: Fly-half
- Current team: Sagamihara DynaBoars (on loan from Leicester Tigers)
Youth career
- 2018–2022: Waratahs Academy
Amateur team(s)
Years	Team	Apps	(Points)
2024–2026	Eastern Suburbs		
Senior career
Years	Team	Apps	(Points)
2023–2026	Waratahs	17	(44)
2026–	Leicester Tigers	0	(0)
2026–2027	→ Sagamihara DynaBoars (loan)	0	(0)
- Correct as of 11 August 2026
International career
Years	Team	Apps	(Points)
2023	Australia U20	6	(54)
- Correct as of 11 August 2026

Jack Bowen (born 30 December 2003) is an Australian rugby union player plays as a fly-half for Japan Rugby League One club Sagamihara DynaBoars, on loan from Premiership club Leicester Tigers.

== Early career ==
Bowen was born in Sydney, New South Wales, Australia in 2003 to Scott Bowen, a former Australian Test player, and Wallaby No. 706.

He began his junior rugby with the Mosman Whales, alongside Teddy Wilson and Henry O'Donnell, while playing junior reps for Northern Suburbs, including winning the U15 State Championships in 2018. Bowen attended Saint Ignatius' College, Riverview. He came through the Waratahs academy and plays his club rugby for Eastern Suburbs, alongside Teddy Wilson. The two started together in the halfbacks for the 2024 Shute Shield final, where Easts defeated Norths 36–35. He was a member of the Australia U20 side throughout 2022 and 2023, making a total of seven caps for the team in the Oceania Rugby U20 Championship and the World Rugby U20 Championship, respectively.

== Career ==
=== Waratahs ===
Bowen had joined the Waratahs Academy, known as Gen Blue, when he was 14-years-old. Ahead of the 2023 Super Rugby Pacific season Bowen was named in the senior Waratahs squad. He made his debut in round nine of the season against the Blues, kicking a conversion. During the off-season, Bowen played club rugby for the Eastern Suburbs in the Shute Shield, alongside teammate Teddy Wilson, and the Australia U20s team.

He was named in the Waratahs squad for the 2024 season, although played just three games across the season, scoring one try and holding an 80% goal kicking rate from the tee, missing a crucial 79th minute penalty goal against the Waratahs' rivals Reds to lose by one point.

Bowen played eight games across the 2025 season for the Waratahs, averaging 20 minutes per game. He scored 13 points across the season, including all six of the Waratahs' points in their final game of the season against the Blues in round sixteen. He Also started for the Waratahs against the British And Irish Lions at Allianz stadium in front of a packed out crowd. The following season, Bowen started at fly-half for the Waratahs for the third time in as many years in their round fourteen matchup against the Fijian Drua. It was revealed that he had been overcoming a pelvic injury (osteitis pubis) since December 2024. He subsequently started for the Waratahs in their following match against the ACT Brumbies, where his flatter play, line attack, and pin-point passing was noted for creating chances and breaking the oppositions defence. Overall, Bowen scored sixteen points in total in 2026. The Waratahs, however, failed to make finals again for a third straight season.

At the end of the 2026 season, head coach Dan McKellar, whom had one year remaining on his contract, resigned. The following month, the Waratahs announced the departure of numerous players, including Bowen.

=== Leicester Tigers ===
In August 2026, Nine.com.au revealed that Bowen has signed a three-year deal with the Leicester Tigers in the English Premiership, with a loan deal to play for Japan Rugby League One club the Sagamihara DynaBoars for the first year. The deal had reportedly been weeks in the making as Bowen had been in discussions with clubs in France, England and Japan. Sagamihara later confirmed the transfer weeks later.

== Personal life ==
Bowen's grandfather is former Australian Grand Slam tennis champion Tony Roche. Bowen played tennis in his youth with Roche, and competed against Cruz Hewitt, son of former Australian tennis player Lleyton Hewitt.

== Career statistics ==
=== Club ===
As of 11 August 2026.

Statistics by club, season and competition
Club	Season	League							Other						Total					
Club	Season	Division	Apps	Tries	Con.	Pen.	Drop	Points	Apps	Tries	Con.	Pen.	Drop	Points	Apps	Tries	Con.	Pen.	Drop	Points
Waratahs	2023	Super Rugby Pacific	1	0	1	0	0	2	—						1	0	1	0	0	2
Waratahs	2024	Super Rugby Pacific	3	1	4	0	0	13	—						3	1	4	0	0	13
Waratahs	2025	Super Rugby Pacific	8	0	2	3	0	13	1 (Note: One appearance in the 2025 Lions tour.)	0	0	0	0	0	9	0	2	3	0	13
Waratahs	2026	Super Rugby Pacific	5	0	5	2	0	16	—						5	0	5	2	0	16
Waratahs	Total		17	1	12	5	0	44	1	0	0	0	0	0	18	1	12	5	0	44

== Awards and honours ==
Eastern Suburbs

- Shute Shield: 2024
- Dave Dennis Waratahs U20 Player of the Year: 2023
