= Taleni Seu =

Samoa international rugby union player (born 1993)

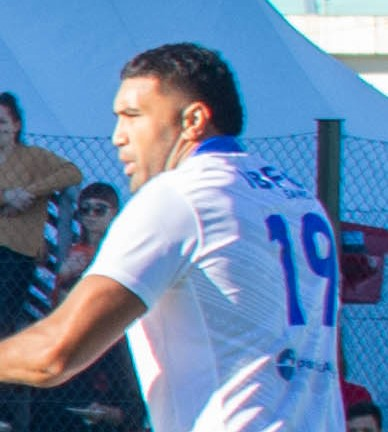
- Seu representing Samoa during the November Internationals
- Born: 26 December 1993 (age 32) Auckland, New Zealand
- Height: 2.02 m (6 ft 8 in)
- Weight: 109 kg (240 lb; 17 st 2 lb)
- School: Onehunga High School

Rugby union career
- Position(s): Flanker, Number 8, Lock
- Current team: Toyota Shuttles
Senior career
| Years | Team | Apps | (Points) |
| 2015–2018 | Auckland | 21 | (25) |
| 2016–2019 | Chiefs | 44 | (20) |
| 2019–2022 2023– | Toyota Shuttles | 52 | (95) |
| 2023 | Waratahs | 13 | (10) |
- Correct as of 28 August 2023
International career
| Years | Team | Apps | (Points) |
| 2022– | Samoa | 6 | (5) |
- Correct as of 28 August 2023

Taleni Seu (born 26 December 1993) is a professional rugby union player who plays as a flanker for Japan Rugby League One club Toyota Shuttles. Born in New Zealand, he represents Samoa at international level after qualifying on ancestry grounds.

== Early life ==
Born in Auckland and raised in Māngere, Seu attended school at Onehunga High School in the city's suburbs where he played first XV rugby as well as playing for the school's basketball team. After graduating from high school, he joined the Auckland academy and went on to play for them at under-18, under-19 and 'B' level while playing his club rugby for Grammar TEC.

== Club career ==
Despite originally not being named in the Auckland squad for the 2015 ITM Cup, Seu was called up as injury cover and managed to force his way into the team over the course the season. He made 8 appearances and scored 2 tries in his side's run to the Premiership final where they narrowly lost to Canterbury. A full squad member in 2016, he made a further 7 Mitre 10 Cup appearances in what turned out to be a disappointing campaign overall for Auckland, which ended up with them finishing outside of the play-off places, in 5th position. It was announced in April 2019 that Taleni will be joining Waikato in the Mitre 10 Cup in the 2019 season.

An impressive debut season in provincial rugby was enough to earn Seu a Super Rugby contract with the Hamilton-based Chiefs for the 2016 Super Rugby season. He enjoyed plenty of game time in his first year in Hamilton, playing in all 17 of the Chiefs games and scoring 2 tries as they reached the competition's semi-finals before going down 25-9 to the Hurricanes. He was retained in the squad for 2017.

== Career statistics ==
=== Club summary ===
As of 9 December 2016

| Season | Team | Games | Starts | Sub | Mins | Tries | Cons | Pens | Drops | Points | Yel | Red |
|---|---|---|---|---|---|---|---|---|---|---|---|---|
| 2016 | Chiefs | 17 | 12 | 5 | 988 | 2 | 0 | 0 | 0 | 10 | 0 | 0 |
| Total | | 17 | 12 | 5 | 988 | 2 | 0 | 0 | 0 | 10 | 0 | 0 |
