= Mahe Vailanu =

Australian rugby union player

- Born: 25 January 1997 (age 29) Tofoa, Tonga
- Height: 178 cm (5 ft 10 in)
- Weight: 109 kg (17 st 2 lb; 240 lb)
- School: Auckland Grammar School
- Notable relative: Sione Vailanu (brother)

Rugby union career
- Position(s): Hooker, Flanker
- Current team: Shimizu Blue Sharks
Senior career
| Years | Team | Apps | (Points) |
| 2017 | Melbourne Rising | 8 | (0) |
| 2018 | NSW Country Eagles | 7 | (5) |
| 2019 | Panasonic Wild Knights | 0 | (0) |
| 2021 | LA Giltinis | 12 | (10) |
| 2025– | Shimizu Blue Sharks | 9 | (5) |
Super Rugby
| Years | Team | Apps | (Points) |
| 2018 | Rebels | 2 | (0) |
| 2022–2025 | Waratahs | 33 | (35) |

Mahe Vailanu (born 10 January 1997) is a Tongan Australian rugby union player who plays for the NSW Waratahs in Super Rugby Pacific.

He previously played for the Rebels in the Super Rugby competition. His position of choice is hooker.

Vailanu started his Australian career in Melbourne, with the Harlequins Rugby club, winning the 2017 Dewar Shield for the season.

Since 2018, Vailanu has played under head coach Darren Coleman. He followed Coleman from the Warringah Rats to the Gordon Highlanders in 2019, then to the LA Giltinis in 2021 and NSW Waratahs in 2022, having won premierships with the Rats, Highlanders and Giltinis.

== Super Rugby statistics ==
As of 15 July 2018

| Season | Team | Games | Starts | Sub | Mins | Tries | Cons | Pens | Drops | Points | Yel | Red |
|---|---|---|---|---|---|---|---|---|---|---|---|---|
| 2018 | Rebels | 2 | 0 | 2 | 22 | 0 | 0 | 0 | 0 | 0 | 0 | 0 |
| Total | | 2 | 0 | 2 | 22 | 0 | 0 | 0 | 0 | 0 | 0 | 0 |
