= Ben Donaldson (rugby union) =

Australian rugby union player

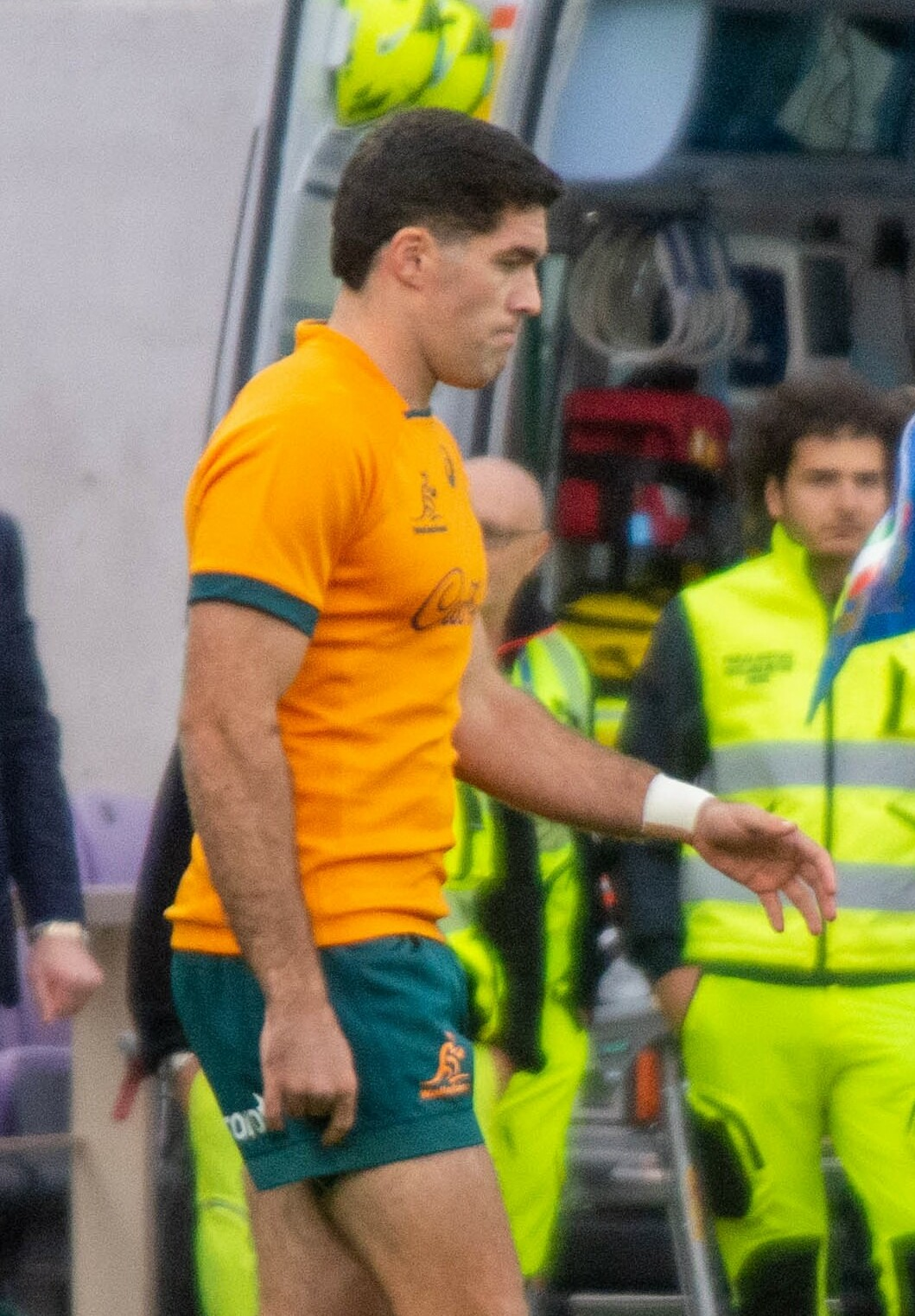
- Donaldson in 2022
- Born: 4 April 1999 (age 27) Sydney, New South Wales, Australia
- Height: 1.84 m (6 ft 0 in)
- Weight: 84 kg (185 lb; 13 st 3 lb)
- School: Waverley College

Rugby union career
- Position(s): Fly-half, Fullback
- Current team: Western Force
Senior career
Years	Team	Apps	(Points)
2017–	Randwick	12	(55)
2018–2019	Sydney Rays	5	(2)
2019–2023	Waratahs	40	(162)
2024–	Western Force	38	(300)
- Correct as of 30 May 2026
International career
Years	Team	Apps	(Points)
2018–2019	Australia U20	4	(23)
2022–	Australia A	5	(24)
2022–	Australia	27	(115)
- Correct as of 10 October 2026
Medal record
Men's rugby union
Representing Australia
Oceania U20 Championship
Winner	2019 Gold Coast

Ben Donaldson (born 4 April 1999) is an Australian professional rugby union player who plays as a fly-half for Super Rugby club the Western Force and the Australia national team.

== Professional career ==
Donaldson made his Super Rugby debut for the New South Wales Waratahs on 11 July 2020 in a victory over the Western Force.

Donaldson made his Australia debut on 13 November 2022, coming on for Noah Lolesio in the 75th minute of a 28–27 loss to Italy in the Autumn Nations Cup. He made his first start at fly-half two weeks later in the game against Wales, and kicked two penalties and a conversion to help Australia to a 39–34 win.

In June 2023, Donaldson signed a two-year contract with the Western Force.

He was a member of the Australian squad for the 2023 Rugby World Cup and played in 4 games scoring 45 points.

In the 2024 Super Rugby Pacific season, Donaldson would finish the year as the season's third leading point scorer, scoring 111 points for the Western Force.

In May 2025, Donaldson signed a two-year extension with the Western Force.
