= Izaia Perese =

Australian rugby union & league player

- Born: 17 May 1997 (age 29) Brisbane, Queensland, Australia
- Height: 1.78 m (5 ft 10 in)
- Weight: 94 kg (207 lb; 14 st 11 lb)
- School: Wavell State High School; Anglican Church Grammar School

Rugby union career
- Position(s): Centre, Wing
- Current team: Reds
Senior career
Years	Team	Apps	(Points)
2015–2018	Queensland Country	12	(49)
2016–2018	Reds	17	(20)
2020	Bayonne	5	(0)
2021–2024	Waratahs	46	(40)
2024–2026	Leicester Tigers	31	(55)
2027–	Reds	0	(0)
- Correct as of 13 June 2026
International career
Years	Team	Apps	(Points)
2014	Australia U18	2	(0)
2017	Australia U20	4	(20)
2021–2023	Australia	6	(0)
- Correct as of 13 June 2026
- Rugby league career

Playing information
- Position: Centre, Wing
Club
Years	Team	Pld	T	G	FG	P
2019	Brisbane Broncos	2	0	0	0	0
- As of 16 November 2026

Izaia Perese (born 17 May 1997) is an Australian rugby player who plays centre and wing for the Reds in the Super Rugby and the Australia national team. He previously played rugby league for the Brisbane Broncos in the National Rugby League (NRL), although he began his career in rugby union playing as an outside back for the Queensland Reds in Super Rugby and for Queensland Country in the National Rugby Championship.

== Early life and youth career ==
Perese was born in Brisbane, Queensland, Australia

He played his junior rugby league for Brisbane Brothers in Stafford and attended Wavell State High School. In 2013, Perese played for the Norths Devils in the Cyril Connell Cup and represented the Queensland under-16 rugby league team, while holding a scholarship with the North Queensland Cowboys.

While attending Anglican Church Grammar School, he played alongside future NRL players Kalyn Ponga, Jaydn Su'A and Brodie Croft, as well as future professional Rugby Union players in Liam Wright, Angus Scott-Young, Mack Mason and Harley Fox in their 2014 title-winning first XV team. Later that year, he was selected for the Australian Schoolboys rugby union team.

In March 2020 Perese pleaded guilty to supplying a dangerous drug in September 2019, but had a probation order for drug charges removed by a court to allow him to travel overseas.

== Rugby league career ==
Perese joined the Brisbane Broncos on a train-and-trial deal, later earning a full-time NRL contract with the club. He began the season playing for the Redcliffe Dolphins in the Queensland Cup, representing the Queensland Residents side in their win over New South Wales.

In round 22 of the 2019 NRL season, Perese made his NRL debut for Brisbane in their 24–12 win against the Penrith Panthers at Suncorp Stadium in Brisbane.

On 18 February, Perese was stood down indefinitely by the Brisbane club after being charged by police with drug-related offences. Perese was later granted bail and is due back in court on 9 March 2020. Brisbane CEO Paul White released a statement saying “Standing down Izaia is not a judgement of his guilt or innocence, but recognition that this is a serious matter, We have discussed our course of action and the reasoning behind it with Izaia, and he understands the action we have taken. We will review the matter as it moves through the legal process".

== Rugby union career ==
In 2015, Perese began playing for Queensland Country in the National Rugby Championship. In 2016, he joined the Queensland Reds senior squad, playing 17 games over three seasons. In August 2017, he was named in the Wallabies squad for The Rugby Championship but did not play a game.

In December 2018, Perese was released from the last year of his contract with the Reds.

In May 2020 Izaia Perese announced his return to Rugby Union, playing for Bayonne in the French top 14.

Perese signed on with the Waratahs until 2024 having previously been used as a Winger for the Reds, Perese made the switch to Centre while playing for the Waratahs.

In March 2024 it was announced that Perese will be joining the English Rugby club Leicester Tigers on a multi-million dollar deal. Perese made his debut for Leicester on 21 September 2024, in a 17–14 win against Exeter Chiefs

In July 2026, it was announced by Rugby Australia (RA) that Perese signed for the Queensland Reds on a two-year deal ahead of their 2027 season. Perese stated upon his signing that his goal was to earn selection into the Wallabies squad for the 2027 Rugby World Cup.

== Career statistics ==
=== Club ===
As of 12 June 2026.

Statistics by club, season and competition
Club	Season	League				Other (Note: Matches in the Premiership Rugby Cup and the Champions Cup.)			Total		
Club	Season	Division	Apps	Tries	Points	Apps	Tries	Points	Apps	Tries	Points
Queensland Country	2015	National Rugby Championship	2	2	10	—			2	2	10
Queensland Country	2016 (Note: In the 2016 season, the National Rugby Championship trialled a law in which the value of a try was worth six points instead of the usual five.)	National Rugby Championship	5	4	24	—			5	4	24
Queensland Country	2017	National Rugby Championship	4	3	15	—			4	3	15
Queensland Country	Total		11	9	49	—			11	9	49
Reds	2017	Super Rugby	12	3	15	—			12	3	15
Reds	2018	Super Rugby	5	1	5	—			5	1	5
Reds	Total		17	4	20	—			17	4	20
Bayonne	2020–21	Top 14	5	0	0	—			5	0	0
Waratahs	2021	Super Rugby AU	5	0	0	—			5	0	0
Waratahs	2021	Super Rugby Trans-Tasman	4	1	5	—			4	1	5
Waratahs	2022	Super Rugby Pacific	11	1	5	—			11	1	5
Waratahs	2023	Super Rugby Pacific	14	4	20	—			14	4	20
Waratahs	2024	Super Rugby Pacific	12	2	10	—			12	2	10
Waratahs	Total		46	8	40	—			46	8	40
Leicester Tigers	2024–25	Premiership	10	3	15	5	3	15	15	6	30
Leicester Tigers	2025–26	Premiership	10	3	15	6	2	10	16	5	25
Leicester Tigers	Total		20	6	30	11	5	25	31	11	55
Career total			99	27	135	11	5	25	110	32	160

=== International ===
As of 12 June 2026.

Statistics by team and year
Team	Year	Statistic		
Team	Year	Apps	Tries	Points
Australia	2021	2	0	0
Australia	2022	1	0	0
Australia	2023	3	0	0
Total		6	0	0
