= Langi Gleeson =

Australian rugby union player

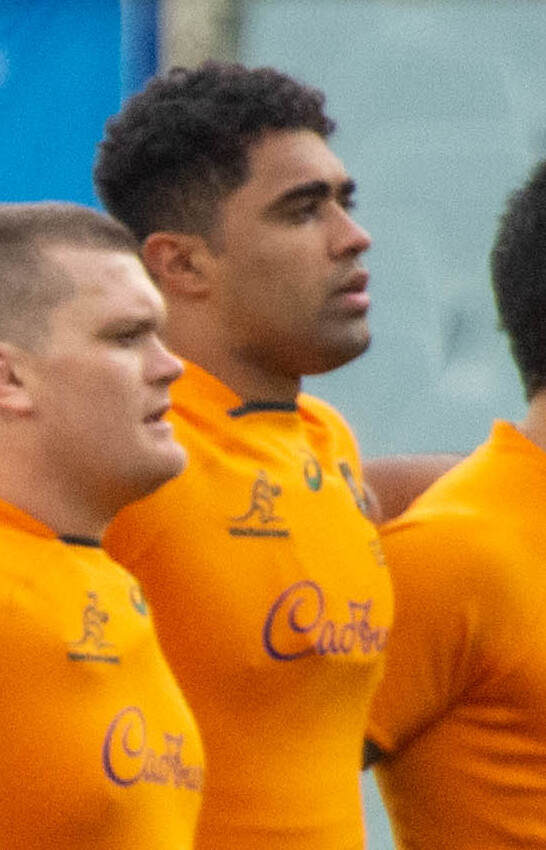
- Gleeson (right) with Australia in 2022
- Born: 21 July 2001 (age 25) Sydney, New South Wales, Australia
- Height: 189 cm (6 ft 2 in)
- Weight: 112 kg (247 lb; 17 st 9 lb)

Rugby union career
- Position(s): Flanker, Number 8
- Current team: Montpellier
Senior career
Years	Team	Apps	(Points)
2022–2025	Waratahs	46	(60)
2025–	Montpellier	2	(0)
- Correct as of 23 May 2026
International career
Years	Team	Apps	(Points)
2022–	Australia A	3	(5)
2022–	Australia	18	(0)
- Correct as of 2 August 2025

Langi Gleeson (born 21 July 2001) is an Australian rugby union player who plays for the Montpellier in Top 14 and Australia national team. His playing position is flanker or number 8. He was named in the Waratahs squad for the 2022 Super Rugby Pacific season as a wider training squad player. He made his Waratahs debut in Round 2 of the 2022 Super Rugby Pacific season against the Reds.

== International career ==
On 30 October 2022, Gleeson made his test debut when he took was substituted for Rob Valetini in the 74th minute against Scotland which the Wallabies won, 16 to 15. On 27 November 2022, Gleeson made his debut test start for Australia in which they won 39 to 34 against Wales.
