= Dylan Pietsch =

Australian rugby sevens player

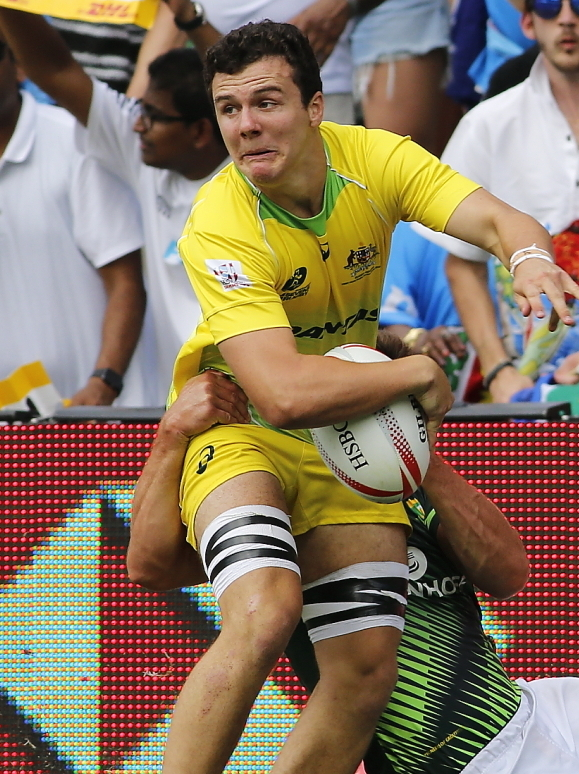
- Pietsch with Australia Sevens in 2017
- Born: 23 April 1998 (age 28) Narrandera, New South Wales, Australia
- Height: 1.87 m (6 ft 2 in)
- Weight: 99 kg (218 lb)
- School: Leeton High School & The King's School

Rugby union career
- Position: Wing
- Current team: Force
Senior career
Years	Team	Apps	(Points)
2017–2023	Randwick	19	(30)
2022–2024	Waratahs	38	(70)
2025–	Force	15	(45)
- Correct as of 30 May 2026
International career
Years	Team	Apps	(Points)
2017–2021	Australia Sevens	87	(120)
2022–2023	Australia A	4	(15)
2024–	Australia	11	(15)
- Correct as of 14 September 2026

Dylan Pietsch (born 23 April 1998) is an Australian professional rugby union player who plays as a wing for Super Rugby club Western Force and the Australia national team.

== International career ==
Pietsch was a member of the Australia men's rugby sevens squad at the 2020 Summer Olympics in Tokyo. Pietsch made his Wallabies debut on 6 July 2024, coming off the bench in a 25–16 victory over Wales at Allianz Stadium in Sydney.

Pietsch is of Wiradjuri ancestry.
