= Max Jorgensen =

Australia international rugby union player

- Born: 2 September 2004 (age 22) Sheffield, South Yorkshire, England
- Height: 181 cm (5 ft 11 in)
- Weight: 88 kg (194 lb)
- School: St Joseph's College, Hunters Hill
- Notable relative: Peter Jorgensen (father)

Rugby union career
- Position(s): Fullback, Wing
- Current team: Waratahs
Youth career
- Waratahs Academy
Super Rugby
Years	Team	Apps	(Points)
2023–	Waratahs	39	(80)
- Correct as of 30 May 2026
International career
Years	Team	Apps	(Points)
2024–	Australia	30	(50)
- Correct as of 17 October 2026

Max Jorgensen (born 2 September 2004) is an Australian professional rugby union player who plays as a wing for the New South Wales Waratahs in Super Rugby, and the Australia national team.

== Early life and career ==
Jorgensen was born in Sheffield in the English county of South Yorkshire in 2004. At the time he was born, his father, Peter, was playing professional rugby union with English Premiership side Rotherham Titans.

=== Waratahs ===
A New South Wales Waratahs academy product and schoolboy representative. Jorgensen also played junior rugby league with the Leichhardt Juniors club. He reportedly turned down an offer from National Rugby League (NRL) club Sydney Roosters.

After being brought into the senior squad for the 2023 Super Rugby season, Jorgensen was named as a starter for the Waratahs in their first round match against the ACT Brumbies. Playing the full match, Jorgensen scored two tries, although the Waratahs lost 25–31. The following week Jorgensen scored another try in a win against the Fijian Drua.

In April 2023, he was named by Eddie Jones in a Wallabies training squad. He was selected in the Australia squad for the 2023 Rugby World Cup, but was ruled out of the tournament after fracturing his fibula in training, without playing a match.

Early in the 2024 Super Rugby season, Jorgensen re-signed with the Waratahs until the end of 2026.

In January 2026 Jorgensen signed a five-year, multimillion dollar contract extension with the Waratahs, which would see him stay with the club until the end of 2031. The deal also allows Jorgensen to take sabbatical seasons overseas in 2028 and 2030. The Sydney Morning Herald reported that the deal came at a time of heightened interest from National Rugby League (NRL) clubs, particularly the Sydney Roosters. The contract was reported to be around A$900k per season. Commenting on the new contract extension, Jorgensen told The Sydney Morning Herald: "I said to my manager, I want to stay. This is where my heart lies and this is where I want to play. It was mainly that I was loving it here and being a part of the Tahs and the Wallabies and I really wanted to stay. I didn't really have any interest going anywhere else. We weren't keeping that a secret or anything. That was pretty much the conversation that were happening over the last six or so months since [negotiations] started, that I wanted to stay."

== International career ==
Born in England to an Australian parent, Jorgensen is eligible to represent Australia or England. Jorgensen holds a British passport. Jorgensen also has Russian ancestry via his father Peter.

Having already been selected in the Wallabies squad for 2023, Jorgensen was selected in the first squad announcement for the 2024 Rugby Championship. Jorgensen made his international debut for Australia in the second round of the 2024 Rugby Championship against South Africa at Perth Stadium, Perth, Western Australia. Australia lost 12–30. In November 2024, he scored the winning try in the last play of a 42–37 victory over England during the 2024 Autumn Nations Series.

== Career statistics ==
=== Super Rugby ===
As of 30 May 2026

Season	Team	Games	Starts	Sub	Mins	Tries	Cons	Pens	Drops	Points	Yel	Red
2023	Waratahs	11	11	0	792	4	0	0	0	20	0	0
2024	Waratahs	8	8	0	638	1	0	0	0	5	1	0
2025	Waratahs	6	6	0	402	3	0	0	0	15	0	0
2026	Waratahs	14	14	0	1074	8	0	0	0	40	0	0
Total		39	39	0	2906	16	0	0	0	80	1	0

=== International tries ===
As of 27 September 2026

List of international tries
Try	Opposing team	Venue	Competition	Date	Result	Score
1	England	Twickenham Stadium, London, England	2024 end-of-year rugby union internationals	9 November 2024	Win	37 - 42
2	Ireland	Aviva Stadium, Dublin, Ireland	2024 end-of-year rugby union internationals	30 November 2024	Loss	22 - 19
3	British & Irish Lions	Lang Park, Brisbane, Australia	2025 British & Irish Lions tour to Australia	19 July 2025	Loss	19 - 27
4	British & Irish Lions	Stadium Australia, Sydney, Australia	2025 British & Irish Lions tour to Australia	2 August 2025	Win	22 - 12
5	South Africa	Ellis Park Stadium, Johannesburg, South Africa	2025 Rugby Championship	16 August 2025	Win	22 - 38
6	South Africa	Cape Town Stadium, Cape Town, South Africa	2025 Rugby Championship	23 August 2025	Loss	30 - 22
7	France	Stade de France, Paris, France	2025 end-of-year rugby union internationals	22 November 2025	Loss	48 - 33
8	Japan	Hanazono Rugby Stadium, Osaka, Japan	2026 Australia–Japan Test series	8 August 2026	Win	32 - 35
9	Argentina	Estadio Malvinas Argentinas, Mendoza, Argentina	2026 Australia tour of Argentina	5 September 2026	Draw	28 - 28
10	South Africa	Perth Stadium, Perth, Australia	2026 Spring International	27 September 2026	Win	42 - 38
