= Harry Johnson-Holmes =

- Born: 2 March 1997 (age 29) Cowra, New South Wales, Australia
- Height: 1.86 m (6 ft 1 in)
- Weight: 119 kg (262 lb; 18 st 10 lb)
- School: Merewether High School

Rugby union career
- Position: Prop
- Current team: Western Force
Senior career
Years	Team	Apps	(Points)
2017–2019	Sydney University	18	(20)
2017–2019	NSW Country Eagles	16	(0)
2018–2024	NSW Waratahs	91	(55)
2025–2026	Western Force	14	(15)
- Correct as of 30 May 2026
International career
Years	Team	Apps	(Points)
2017	Australia U20	5	(5)
2019	Australia	1	(0)
- Correct as of 20 April 2026

Harry Johnson-Holmes (born 2 March 1997) is an Australia professional rugby union player who plays as a prop for Super Rugby club Western Force and the Australia national team.

== Club career ==
Johnson-Holmes started his professional career with the NSW Country Eagles, making his National Rugby Championship debut against the Greater Sydney Rams during the 2017 season at Parramatta Stadium in Sydney.

== International career ==
Johnson-Holmes was chosen to represent Australia at the 2017 World Rugby Under 20 Championship, making his first international appearance against Wales.
