= Dave Porecki =

Australian rugby union player

- Full name: David Porecki
- Born: 23 October 1992 (age 34) Sydney, Australia
- Height: 1.85 m (6 ft 1 in)
- Weight: 108 kg (238 lb; 17 st 0 lb)

Rugby union career
- Position: Hooker
- Current team: Waratahs
Senior career
Years	Team	Apps	(Points)
2014	North Harbour Rays	8	(5)
2015–2016	Saracens	4	(0)
2016–2020	London Irish	52	(75)
2015, 2020–2025	Waratahs	44	(55)
- Correct as of 31 May 2025
International career
Years	Team	Apps	(Points)
2022–25	Australia	21	(10)
- Correct as of 15 May 2026

David Porecki (born 23 October 1992 in Australia) is a retired Australian rugby union player who last played for the Waratahs in Super Rugby and the Australian national team, the Wallabies. His playing position was hooker.

== Rugby career ==
=== Domestic ===
Porecki made one brief appearance off the bench for Waratahs against Cheetahs during the 2015 Super Rugby season. He joined Saracens as cover during the 2015 Rugby World Cup. Porecki was eligible to represent England as his mother is from that country. He is also of polish descent. In 2016 he left Saracens to join London Irish and in his first season at the club was part of the side that defeated Yorkshire Carnegie in the RFU Championship play-off final to win promotion back to the Premiership.

In July 2020 it was confirmed that Porecki would return to the Waratahs for their Super Rugby campaign.

=== International ===
On 2 July 2022, Porecki made his debut for Australia starting in a win against England at Perth Stadium.
