= Jake Gordon =

Australia international rugby union player

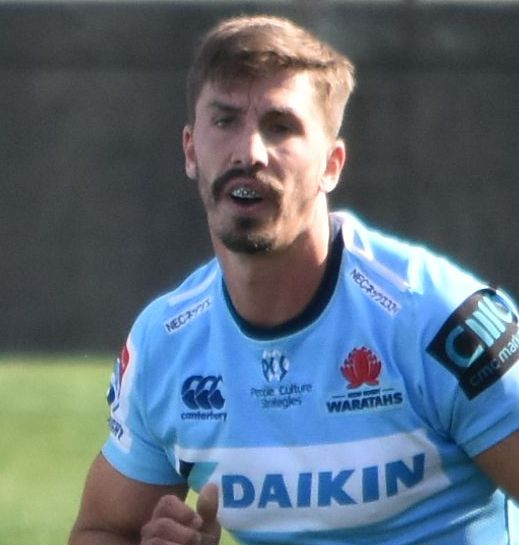
- Gordon representing the Waratahs during Super Rugby, February 2019
- Born: 6 July 1993 (age 33) Newtown, New South Wales, Australia
- Height: 187 cm (6 ft 2 in)
- Weight: 89 kg (196 lb; 14 st 0 lb)
- School: Sydney Secondary College
- University: University of Sydney

Rugby union career
- Position: Scrum-half
- Current team: Waratahs
Amateur team(s)
Years	Team	Apps	(Points)
2013–2019	Sydney University	78	(220)
- Correct as of 16 July 2022
Senior career
Years	Team	Apps	(Points)
2014–2015	Sydney Stars	17	(30)
2016–2019	NSW Country Eagles	25	(104)
2017–	Waratahs	120	(165)
- Correct as of 30 May 2026
International career
Years	Team	Apps	(Points)
2018–	Australia	37	(20)
- Correct as of 3 November 2026

Jake Gordon (born 6 July 1993) is an Australian rugby union player who plays for Super Rugby franchise New South Wales Waratahs, and the Wallabies.

== Early life ==
Born in Sydney, Jake grew up in Newtown, New South Wales where he first started to play rugby, playing the ages at Canterbury Juniors. Gordon is a product of Sydney University's first-grade side, who he has played for since 2013.

== Professional career ==
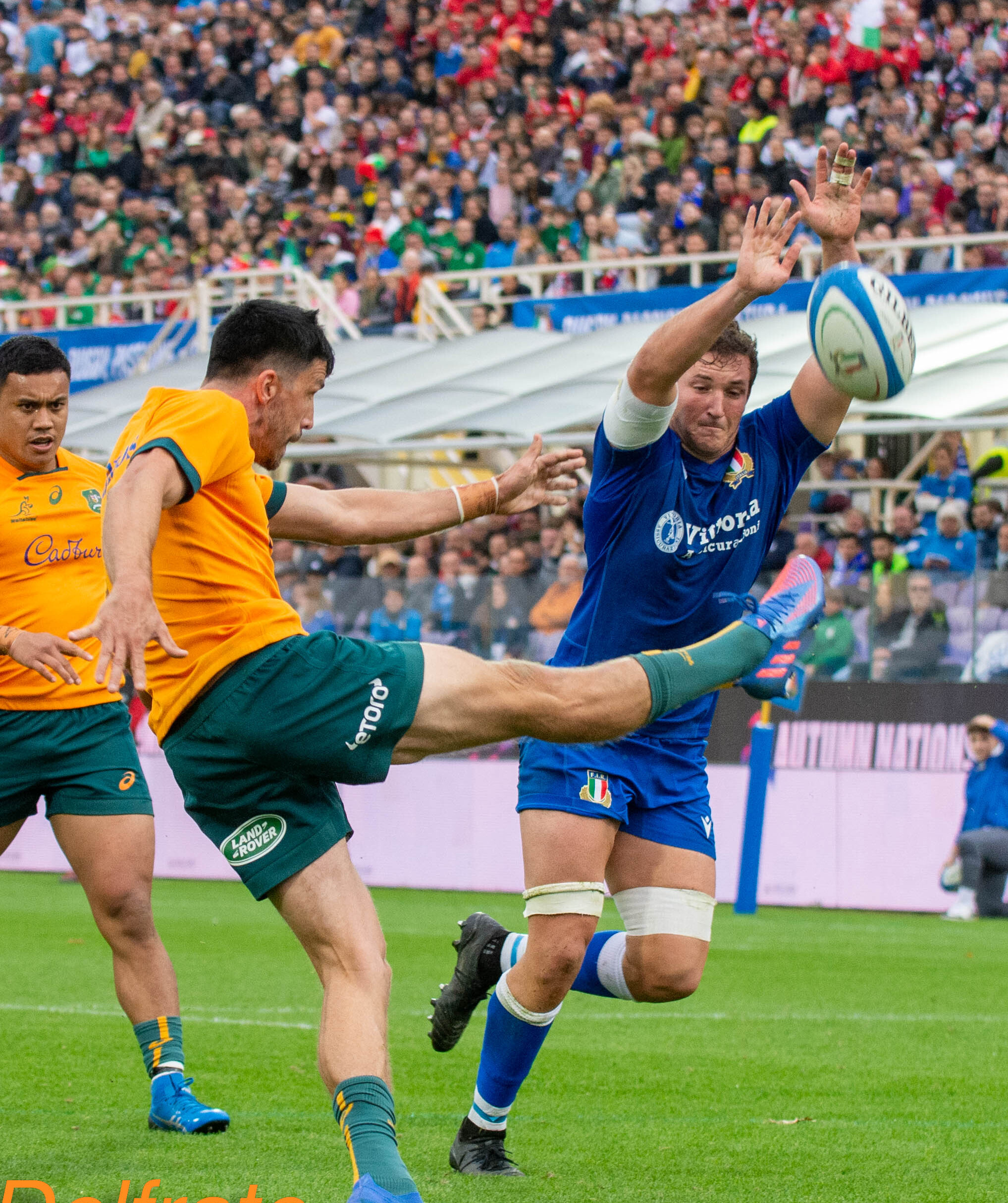
Gordon making a clearance kick, 2022

In 2014, he was selected for the inaugural season of the National Rugby Championship (NRC), playing for the Sydney Stars. He remained with the side for the 2015 season, which saw Gordon start in all nine games, including the semi-final against Brisbane City whom won the match: 47–32. Since the dissolution of the Sydney Stars, Gordon changed teams to the New South Wales Country Eagles.

In 2016, Gordon signed with the New South Wales Waratahs on a one-year deal after training with the extended playing squad in 2015. However, for all of the 2016 Super Rugby season, Gordon was behind Nick Phipps and Matt Lucas and did not make an appearance all season. Gordon was later a key figure in the New South Wales Country Eagles team that finished runner-up to Perth Spirit in the 2016 National Rugby Championship. He finished the season as joint-try scorer with 9 tries to his name and was voted as the 2016 Buildcorp NRC Players’ Player at the annual RUPA Awards.

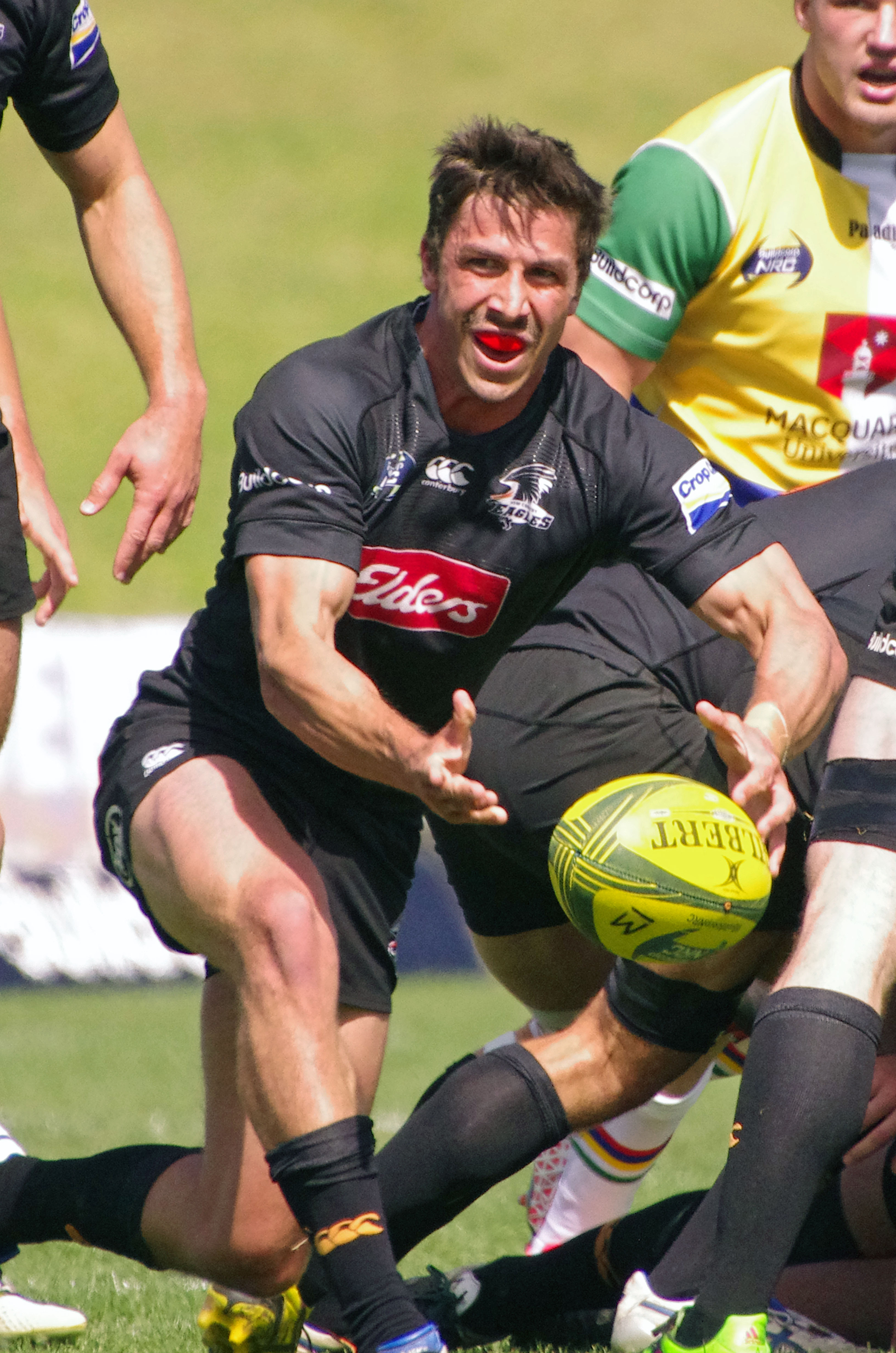
Gordon playing for the New South Wales Country Eagles.

In 2017, Gordon remained as a member of the Waratahs extended playing squad. With injury to Nick Phipps in the early part of the 2017 Super Rugby season, Gordon found himself on the bench ahead of the Round 2 clash against the Lions and replaced Matt Lucas on the 60th minute to make his Super Rugby debut. In Round 4, he scored his first Super Rugby try in just his second appearance for his franchise. He earned his first start the following week against the Melbourne Rebels.

On 3 June 2017, Gordon was a late call up to the Australia national squad, replacing injured team mate Nick Phipps, ahead of their June tests.

In 2024, Gordon was called up to the Australia national squad by the new head coach Joe Schmidt.
