= Darren Coleman =

Australian rugby union coach (born 1973)

- Born: Darren Coleman; 1973 (age 52–53) Blacktown, New South Wales

Rugby union career
- Position(s): Fly-half, Inside Centre, Coach
Senior career
Years	Team	Apps	(Points)
1995	Eastern Suburbs		
1996–1997	Hunter Wildfires		
1998–2000	Northern Suburbs		
Coaching career
- Years: Team
- 2022–2024: NSW Waratahs
- 2021: LA Giltinis
- 2018–2020: Gordon
- 2014–2018: NSW Country Eagles
- 2017–2018: Warringah
- 2011–2013: Toyota Industries Shuttles
- 2007–2008: L'Aquila
- 2006–2007: Northern Suburbs
- 2005: Penrith Emus
- 2002–2004: Calgary Mavericks

Darren Coleman (born 1973) is an Australian professional rugby union coach. As of 2024, he is Director of Rugby at Hunter Wildfires.

== Family and early life ==
Coleman was born in Sydney and he grew up in South West Rocks on the Mid North Coast of New South Wales, before moving south to play in the Sydney club rugby competition.

His younger brother Scott Coleman also became a professional rugby coach, appointed to Italian club Benevento in 2013.

== Rugby career ==
While attending Southern Cross University in the late 1990s Coleman played for the University Gold Rats alongside Justin Harrison. Coleman played as a fly-half in Sydney's club rugby competition from 1995 to 2000 for Eastern Suburbs, Newcastle Wildfires, and Northern Suburbs. He was a rugby development officer in Newcastle.

Coleman combined playing with coaching in the early part of his career. While playing for Northern Suburbs, he was appointed as head coach of the NSW Waratahs Academy in 1998, and then as a skills coach to the Waratahs for the 2000 Super 12 season. In late 2000 he left Australia to take up contract stints as a player-coach with Irish club Waterpark, Italian Serie A team Benevento _{[it]} and the Calgary Saints and Calgary Mavericks in Canada.

== Coaching ==
Coleman came back to Australia and joined the Penrith Emus as the head coach for the 2005 Shute Shield season. He then returned to Northern Suburbs as head coach for 2006 and 2007. Coleman was also assistant coach to the Central Coast Rays in the Australian Rugby Championship in 2007. He was appointed to professional Italian club L'Aquila for the 2007–08 season. guiding them to a promotion play-off for the Serie A Division.

He joined the Brumbies as head coach of the Brumbies Academy for the 2009 season. Brumbies head coach Andy Friend nominated Coleman as the Brumbies attack coach for the 2011 Super Rugby season, but the appointment was vetoed by the administration. He left for Japan to coach Toyota Industries Shuttles, where he guided the team to gain promotion to the Top League for the 2013–14 season.

On returning to Australia again, Coleman was coaching director of Eastern Suburbs from 2014 to 2016. He was appointed head coach of NSW Country Eagles in 2014, and head coach of Sydney club Warringah in 2017. Coleman won the Shute Shield premiership with Warringah in 2017. He was appointed head coach of Gordon in 2018, winning the Shute Shield with that club in 2020.

Coleman was announced as the head coach of Major League Rugby team LA Giltinis in the United States for their inaugural season in 2021. The Giltinis won the Western Conference and MLR Championship that year, before Coleman returned to Sydney to coach the New South Wales Waratahs for the 2022 season of Super Rugby.

=== Honours ===
LA Giltinis
- Major League Rugby
  - Championship winner: 2021
  - Western Conference champion: 2021

NSW Country Eagles

- National Rugby Championship
  - Runner-up: 2014, 2016
  - Minor premier: 2016

Central Coast Rays

- Australian Rugby Championship
  - Winner (assistant coach): 2007

Warringah

- Australian Club Championship
  - Winner: 2018
- Shute Shield
  - Winner: 2017
  - Runner-up: 2018

Gordon

- Shute Shield
  - Winner: 2020
  - Minor premier: 2020
