= Teddy Wilson (rugby union) =

Australian rugby union player (born 2003)

- Born: 25 February 2003 (age 23) Australia
- Height: 1.82 m (6 ft 0 in)
- Weight: 84 kg (185 lb)
- Notable relative: David Wilson (father)

Rugby union career
- Position: Scrum-half
- Current team: Waratahs
Senior career
Years	Team	Apps	(Points)
2022–	Waratahs	36	(30)
- Correct as of 30 May 2026
International career
Years	Team	Apps	(Points)
2025–	Australia A	1	(5)
- Correct as of 4 June 2026

Teddy Wilson (born 25 February 2003) is an Australian rugby union player who plays for the Waratahs in Super Rugby. His playing position is scrum-half. The son of former Wallabies captain David was named in the Waratahs squad for Round 5 of the 2022 Super Rugby Pacific season against the Force. He made his debut for the Waratahs in Round 6 of the 2022 Super Rugby Pacific season against the Reds.

Wilson would be named captain of the Junior Wallabies in 2023. The scrumhalf captained Australia to fifth at the tournament in South Africa
