= 2025 Super Rugby AUS =

Rugby union competition edition

- Countries: Australia
- Date: 13 September – 5 October 2025
- Champions: Waratahs (1st title)
- Runners-up: Force
- Matches played: 7
- Tries scored: 68 (average 9.7 per match)
- Top point scorer: Sid Harvey, Waratahs (40)
- Top try scorer: Jimmy Hendren, Waratahs (4)

Official website
- www.rugby.com.au

2025 Super Rugby AUS was the inaugural season of Australia's national rugby union competition, Super Rugby AUS, organised by Rugby Australia (RA). It involves four of Australia's Super Rugby teams (also known as franchises): the Brumbies, the Force, the Reds and the Waratahs. The competition began on 13 September and finished with the Grand Final on 5 October 2025.

The Waratahs won the inaugural Super Rugby AUS title on 5 October, defeating the Western Force in Wanneroo 33–26.

== Competition and format ==
The 2025 Super Rugby AUS is structured as a short-format, domestic rugby union competition featuring Australia's four Super Rugby franchises: the Brumbies, the Force, the Reds and the Waratahs. The tournament is scheduled to take place over four weeks, running from 13 September to 5 October 2025, and is designed to provide additional high-level match opportunities for professional players outside the main Super Rugby Pacific season and international selection.

The competition follows a single round-robin format during the regular season, with each team playing the other three teams once across three rounds. Matches are scheduled across a combination of traditional venues and regional locations, with a focus on community engagement and development. Several fixtures are scheduled as double-headers alongside the Super Rugby Men's Under-19 competition. Following the conclusion of the round-robin stage, the top two teams on the competition ladder advance to a single Grand Final, to be held on Sunday, 5 October 2025, the day after the Wallabies' Bledisloe Cup Test match against New Zealand in Perth.

== Venues and personnel ==
Upon the announcement of the new competition and its schedule for 2025, the venue for the Brumbies home fixture for Round 3 was confirmed to be Viking Park in the Canberra suburb of Wanniassa. One of the Waratahs' venues was confirmed, Dangar Park, Narrabri in Northern New South Wales. The venue itself had hosted Waratahs' pre-season trials in years prior, and is seen as a regional link to the team which holds an annual "Festival of Rugby" event, sponsored by Santos. Over a month later, the Force confirmed their home venue (Tompkins Park) for rounds 2 and 3. Tompkins Park, located in the Perth suburb of Alfred Cove, is home to the Palmyra Rugby Club in Perth's Premier Grade competition. The Queensland Reds' home venue of Ballymore Stadium was confirmed by The Roar on 20 August. The Waratahs' second home fixture was confirmed on 25 August to be played at the home ground of Shute Shield club Warringah Rats, Pittwater Park, also known as "Rat Park" in Sydney's Warriewood suburb.

Brumbies	Waratahs	
Viking Park, Wanniassa	Dangar Park, Narrabri	Pittwater Park, Warriewood
Capacity: 7,000	Capacity: 5,000	Capacity: 10,000
2025 Super Rugby AUS is located in Australia		Reds
2025 Super Rugby AUS is located in Australia		Ballymore Stadium, Herston
2025 Super Rugby AUS is located in Australia		Capacity: 8,000
2025 Super Rugby AUS is located in Australia		Force
2025 Super Rugby AUS is located in Australia		Tompkins Park, Alfred Cove
2025 Super Rugby AUS is located in Australia		—N/a

=== Personnel ===
Team	Coach	Captain	Refs.
Brumbies	Stephen Larkham	Luke Reimer	
Force	James Stannard	Darcy Swain	
Reds	Les Kiss	Jock Campbell	
Waratahs	Lachlan McCaffrey	Matt Philip	

== Ladder ==
Pos	Team	Pld	W	D	L	PF	PA	PD	TF	TA	TB	LB	Pts	Qualification
1	Force	3	2	0	1	92	85	+7	15	11	2	0	10	Grand Final
2	Waratahs (C)	3	2	0	1	92	77	+15	13	12	1	0	9	Grand Final
3	Reds	3	2	0	1	102	95	+7	16	15	1	0	9	
4	Brumbies	3	0	0	3	95	124	−29	15	20	0	0	0	

Source: Rugby.com.au
(C) Champion

== Fixtures ==
=== Round 1 ===
12 September
19:30 AEST (UTC+10)

Waratahs	3–24	Force (1 BP)
Pen: Harvey (1/1) 8'; Cards: Philip (yellow card) 19' to 29'	Report	Try: Robertson 42' c Swain 50' c Grealy 79' c Con: Burey (3/3) 43', 51', 80'; Pen: Burey (1/1) 40+3'

Pittwater Park, Warriewood
Attendance: 1,000
Referee: Reuben Keane

14 September
15:00 AEST (UTC+10)

Reds	36–26	Brumbies
Try: Ryan (3) 2' m, 26' m, 30' m Latu 18' c Pakeho 40+1' c Hough 80' c Con: McLaughlin-Phillips (2/5) 19', 40+2'; Campbell (1/1) 80+1'	Report	Try: Reimer 8' c Thorn 20' c Creighton 64' c Mickelson 69' m Con: Meredith (3/4) 9', 21', 64'; Cards: Pritchard (yellow card) 39' to 49'

Ballymore Stadium, Herston
Attendance: 1,904
Referee: Nic Berry

=== Round 2 ===
20 September
14:00 AWST (UTC+8)

(1 BP) Force	46–35	Brumbies
Try: Landman 4' c Fine 18' m Burey (2) 22' c, 67' m Harris 31' m Swain 35' c Grealy 71' m Leahy 79' m Con: Burey (3/7) 5', 23', 36'; Donaldson (0/1)	Report	Try: Ieli 1' c Thorn 10' c Wilcox 38' c Macpherson 54' c van Nek 58' c Con: Meredith (5/5) 1', 11', 39', 54', 59'; Cards: Taii Tualima (yellow card) 71'

Tompkins Park, Alfred Cove
Referee: Jordan Kaminski

20 September
17:45 AEST (UTC+10)

(1 BP) Waratahs	47–19	Reds
Try: Hendren (4) 2' c, 27' c, 49' m, 76' c Adamson 13' c Ropata 58' c Halaholo 73' c Con: Harvey (6/7) 3', 14', 28', 59', 74', 77'	Report	Try: Brial 5' c Anderson 16' m Faessler 41' c Con: Campbell (2/3) 6', 43'

Dangar Park, Narrabri
Attendance: 3,600
Referee: George Myers

=== Round 3 ===
27 September
17:00 AEST (UTC+10)

Brumbies	34–42	Waratahs
Try: Oates 10' m McLeod (2) 26' c, 39' m Meredith 45' c Wilcox 49' m Thorn 62' m Con: Meredith (2/6) 26', 45'	Report	Try: Adamson (2) 6' c, 72' c Dobbins 23' c Halaholo 36' c Grant 48' c Wilson 77' c Con: Harvey (6/6) 6', 23', 36', 48', 72', 77

Viking Park, Wanniassa
Referee: Todd Cummings

28 September
14:30 AWST (UTC+8)

Force	22–47	Reds (1 BP)
Try: Burey 11' m Palmer 34' m Poolman 54' m Donaldson 66' c Con: Donaldson (1/4) 66'; Cards: Nofoagatotoa (yellow card) 78'	Report	Try: Latu (2) 19' c, 48' c Rubens (2) 22' c, 30' c Toomaga-Allen 27' c Cartwright 60' m Martens 69' c Con: McLaughlin-Phillips (6/7) 20', 22', 27', 30', 48', 70'

Tompkins Park, Alfred Cove
Referee: Graham Cooper

== Grand Final ==
5 October
13:00 AWST (UTC+8)

Force	26–33	Waratahs
Try: Poolman 15' c Beale 19' c Watts 42' m Ekuasi 49' c Con: Donaldson (3/4) 16', 20', 50'	Report	Try: Jacques 21' m Harvey 28' c McDonald 32' c Halaholo 73' c Durbidge 79' c Con: Harvey (4/5) 29', 33', 73', 80'

Kingsway Regional Sporting Complex, Wanneroo
Referee: Nic Berry

FB	15	Max Burey
RW	14	Justin Landman
OC	13	George Poolman
IC	12	Kurtley Beale
LW	11	Mac Grealy
FH	10	Ben Donaldson
SH	9	Henry Robertson
N8	8	Vaiolini Ekuasi
OF	7	Kane Koteka
BF	6	Will Harris
RL	5	Darcy Swain (c)
LL	4	Mitch Watts
TP	3	Tiaan Tauakipulu
HK	2	Albert Alcock
LP	1	Marley Pearce
Replacements:
HK	16	Wes Thomas
PR	17	Max Sawers
PR	18	Sean Paranihi
LK	19	Reed Prinsep
N8	20	Titi Nofoagatotoa
SH	21	Issak Fines-Leleiwasa
CE	22	Ronan Leahy
WG	23	Boston Fakafanua
Coach:
James Stannard

FB	15	Jimmy Hendren
RW	14	Leo Jacques
OC	13	Jackson Ropata
IC	12	Lawson Creighton (c)
LW	11	Sid Harvey
FH	10	Joey Fowler
SH	9	Michael McDonald
N8	8	Leafi Talataina
OF	7	Jamie Adamson
BF	6	Clem Halaholo
RL	5	Miles Amatosero
LL	4	Ben Grant
TP	3	Daniel Botha
HK	2	Ethan Dobbins
LP	1	Tom Lambert
Replacements:
HK	16	Bruce Kauika-Petersen
PR	17	Isaac Aedo Kailea
PR	18	Apolosi Ranawai
LK	19	Matt Philip
N8	20	Austin Durbidge
SH	21	Teddy Wilson
CE	22	Joey Walton
WG	23	Otto Serfontein
Coach:
Lachlan McCaffrey

Man of the Match:
Clem Halaholo (Waratahs)

== Awards ==
=== Player of the Year ===
Player of the Tournament
Player	Position	Team
Max Burey	Fly-half	Force

=== Team of the Season ===
Team of the Season
Pos.	Player
1	Sef Fa'agase (Reds)
2	Ethan Dobbins (Waratahs)
3	Daniel Botha (Waratahs)
4	Seru Uru (Reds)
5	Mitch Watts (Force)
BR	Clem Halaholo (Waratahs)
BR	Jamie Adamson (Waratahs)
BR	Vaiolini Ekuasi (Force)
9	Henry Robertson (Force)
10	Max Burey (Force)
11	Sid Harvey (Waratahs)
12	Jarrah McLeod (Brumbies)
13	George Poolman (Force)
14	Tim Ryan (Reds)
15	Jimmy Hendren (Waratahs)

== Squads ==
Brumbies squad
Forwards
- Tevita Alatini
- Lipina Ata
- Ollie Aylmer
- Finn Baxter
- Liam Bowron
- Drew Brndusi
- Tauti Chan-Tung
- Harvey Cordukes
- Darcy Fogarty
- Jack Harley
- Lington Ieli
- Eli Langi
- Toby MacPherson
- Chris Mickelson
- Luke Reimer
- Judah Saumaisue
- Rory Scott
- Lachlan Shaw
- Tuaina Taii Tualima
- Rhys van Nek
Backs
- Louis Bartley-Saena
- Hudson Creighton
- Joe Dillon
- Malakye Enasio
- David Feliuai
- Jarrah McLeod
- Declan Meredith
- Dan Nelson
- Kye Oates
- Kadin Pritchard
- Ollie Sapsford
- Klayton Thorn
- Shane Wilcox
Coach
Stephen Larkham

Force squad
Forwards
- Albert Alcock
- Ollie Barrett
- Riley Brewis
- Billy Browne
- Jack Daly
- Nic Dolly
- Vaiolini Ekuasi
- Will Harris
- Harry Hoopert
- Max Johnson
- Harry Johnson-Holmes
- Kane Koteka
- Bradley Kuhn
- Titi Nofoagatotoa
- Sean Paranihi
- Marley Pearce
- Reed Prinsep
- Dane Sawers
- Max Sawers
- Papillon Sevele
- HD Stemmet
- Darcy Swain
- Tiaan Tauakipulu
- Wes Thomas
- Mitch Watts
Backs
- Luke Aiken
- Kurtley Beale
- Max Burey
- Ben Donaldson
- Boston Fakafanua
- Viliami Fine
- Issak Fines-Leleiwasa
- Mac Grealy
- Bayley Kuenzle
- Justin Landman
- Ronan Leahy
- Ryan McGloin
- Henry Palmer
- Divad Palu
- Doug Philipson
- George Poolman
- Finn Prass
- Henry Robertson
- Tiam Toufan
Coach
James Stannard

Reds squad
Forwards
- George Blake
- Jack Brady
- Joe Brial
- Charlie Brosnan
- Massimo de Lutiis
- Sef Fa'agase
- Matt Faessler
- Theo Fourie
- Ollie Harris
- Kohan Herbert
- Zac Hough
- Trevor King
- Vice Latu
- Hamish Muller
- Tom Robinson
- Aidan Ross
- Jeffery Toomaga-Allen
- Seru Uru
- Harrison Usher
- Connor Vest
Backs
- Lachie Anderson
- Jock Campbell
- Will Cartwright
- Josh Flook
- Isaac Henry
- James Martens
- Will McCulloch
- Harry McLaughlin-Phillips
- Heremaia Murray
- Dre Pakeho
- Xavier Rubens
- Tim Ryan
- Kalani Thomas
Coach
Les Kiss

Waratahs squad
Forwards
- Jamie Adamson
- Miles Amatosero
- Siosifa Amone
- Jack Barrett
- Daniel Botha
- Brady Dawson
- Ethan Dobbins
- Eamon Doyle
- Austin Durbidge
- Oniti Finau
- Chlayton Frans
- Charlie Gamble
- Will Goddard
- Ben Grant
- Clem Halaholo
- Isaac Aedo Kailea
- Tom Lambert
- Bruce Kauika-Petersen
- Matt Philip
- Apolosi Ranawai
- Pete Samu
- Leafi Talataina
Backs
- Jack Bowen
- Lawson Creighton
- Joey Fowler
- Liam Grover
- Sid Harvey
- Jimmy Hendren
- Leo Jacques
- Michael McDonald
- James McGregor
- Lebron Naea
- Henry O'Donnell
- Triston Reilly
- Jackson Ropata
- Archie Saunders
- Otto Serfontein
- Hwi Sharples
- Joey Walton
- Teddy Wilson
Coach
Lachlan McCaffrey
