= Sydney University Football Club =

Australian rugby union club, based in Sydney

(Australia) Sydney University Football Club
- Nicknames: Students; Varsity; Uni
- Founded: 1863; 163 years ago
- Location: Camperdown, Sydney, New South Wales
- Ground: Sydney University Football Ground (Capacity: 2,500)
- President: David Lyons
- Director of Rugby: John Manenti
- Coach: John Manenti
- Captain: Eamon Doyle
- Leagues: Shute Shield; NSWSRU
- 2026: 7th of 12
Team kit

Official website
- sydneyunirugby.com.au

The Sydney University Football Club (SUFC), established as the University of Sydney Rugby Union Football Club, is an Australian rugby union club based in Camperdown, Sydney, New South Wales who compete in the Shute Shield.

The SUFC cites its founding year as 1863 (Note: The foundation date of 1863 is disputed by some authors, such as Thomas Hickie and Sean Fagan. The alternative date of foundation given is 1865.) making it the oldest existing rugby club in the country and the Southern Hemisphere.However, while teams from the University played football under unspecified rules from 1865 to 1869, the SUFC was not formally established until 1871, following the founding the previous year of the Wallaroo FC under rugby rules.

After playing home fixtures at the Sydney University Oval No.1 for 153 years, the club moved to the redeveloped Oval No.2 for the 2016 season. Sydney Uni Sport completed the building of a new training facility and grandstand at that ground accommodating 1,200 spectators. Being a founding team of Sydney's premier rugby union club competition in 1874, Sydney University is the most successful team in its history with 42 premierships. The club's most recent premiership was achieved in 2022 after defeating Gordon 26–19 at Leichhardt Oval.

== Club information ==
- Women's Rugby: Founded in 1994.
- Juniors: Founded in 2005 and comprises Balmain Junior Rugby Club, Canterbury Rugby and Petersham Juniors Rugby Club. These clubs include girls and boys teams.

== History ==
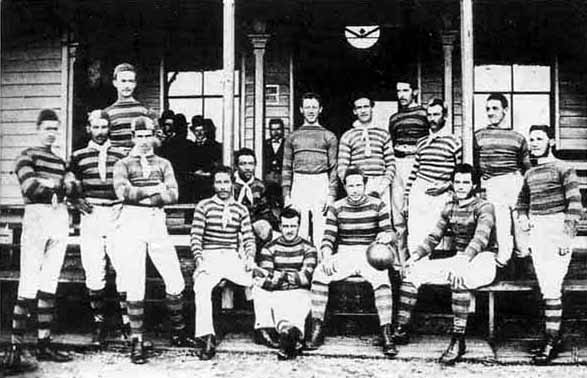
Sydney University team of 1878

The "Sydney University Football Club" (SUFC) held its founding formal meeting in 1871 at the Metropolitan Hotel, although the University students had since 1865 been playing ad hoc organised games against Sydney's few clubs and visiting military sides, all under undefined playing rules.

The club is often referred to as "Uni", "The Students", as well as "The Birthplace of Australian Rugby" or simply "The Birthplace", marking its origins at a pioneer rugby club. SUFC is recognised as the oldest existing rugby union club outside of Great Britain. However, as in the Home Nations, rugby historians distinguish a university or a school club from traditional town or open clubs due to its status as an educational institution with members and teams composed of students.

The first mention of students at the University playing football came in The Sydney Morning Herald editions of 19 and 26 August 1865 which reported the students holding an internal game (1st year vs combined 2nd & 3rd years) and then meeting the Sydney FC. A quote dated as 22 August 1865 on the SUFC website is inaccurate.

In June 1874 the SUFC famously missed attending the first meeting of the founding of the New South Wales Rugby Union (NSWRU)(then called the Southern Rugby Football Union) and the colony's adoption of the rugby union laws of England's Rugby Football Union. The club however did take part in further meetings with other clubs where they wrote explanatory notes to assist local footballers understand the new rules which came into force in late July 1874.

Although the SUFC ultimately decided to stay with rugby union, over the 1877–80 seasons the SUFC advocated for the NSWRU to swap codes to Australian rules and then attempted to arrange games under that code against Melbourne FC, culminating in the formation of the NSW Football Association (NSWFA). In 1887 a Sydney University club formed to play Australian rules and joined the NSWFA, then in 1888 played the first inter-varsity football game against Melbourne University FC.

The SUFC jersey colours have since 1875 been traditionally blue and gold hooped stripes. All white uniforms were used until the end of 1874 and again in 1930-33.

For four season over 1889 to 1893 the SUFC club entered two teams in the Sydney first grade competition. Both wore the club's traditional colours. The two sides met in matches a number of times. At the end of the 19th century the SUFC was Sydney's most successful club having won nine premierships, two more than traditional local rivals Wallaroo FC with seven. When in 1900 the existing Sydney club rugby competition structure was replaced by a district club scheme with player eligibility determined by their place of residence, the SUFC alone was given exemption to remain, so long as it confined its selected grade teams to current and former students only.

In 1920 internal factions within the SUFC attempted to have the club swap codes to rugby league. After this failed, disaffected SUFC players and officials resigned from the club and formed the Sydney University Amateur Rugby League Club, which played in the city's first grade competition (now the National Rugby League) until the end of 1937. Despite the ongoing impacts of this division of the University's footballers, the SUFC won the Sydney rugby union club premiership seven times during years the rugby league club existed.

== Honours ==
The Club has won 29 Shute Shield Major Premierships and has been runners-up 12 times. The Club has won 50 Premierships and has been runners-up 24 times since 1865.

- Premiership Titles since 1900 (the Shute Shield started in 1923): (33) 1901 (shared), 1904, 1919, 1920, 1923, 1924, 1926, 1927, 1928, 1937, 1939, 1945, 1951, 1953, 1954, 1955, 1961, 1962, 1968, 1970, 1972, 2001, 2005, 2006, 2007, 2008, 2009, 2010, 2012, 2013, 2018, 2019, 2022
- Australian Club Champions: (5) 2007, 2008, 2013, 2014, 2020, 2022 (not contested), 2023
- Gregor George Cup Club Championships: (24) 1927, 1937, 1941, 1942, 1961, 1983, 1999, 2001, consecutively from 2004 to 2019 and 2022
- Jack Scott Cup: The Women's XVs team is notable in the Jack Scott Cup, winning 5 of the last 6 titles. In 2020, the Students picked up both Major and Minor Premierships after going through the regular season undefeated for the third year. The Women's team defeated Randwick 22–17 in the Grand Final.
- *2021 SEASON CANCELLED In response to COVID-19 Sydney University was leading the competition without a loss when NSW Rugby Union (NSWRU) and its affiliate unions jointly made the decision to cancel all winter rugby competitions in the Sydney region (and Illawarra). Seven rounds were contested by the Shute Shield teams.

== International representatives ==
To date, 134* Sydney University players have been selected to play for Australia. The first Australian representative was Hyram Marks in 1899. The club's most famous Wallaby would probably be Nick Farr-Jones, who had a long representative career (including World Cup success as Captain in 1991). Harry Potter became Wallaby #989 and proudly joined the ranks of SUFC Wallabies as the 112th player from our club to achieve this honour. Harry also scored a try on debut at Murrayfield, Scotland on 25 November 2024.

- *N.B. Not necessarily played for the Wallabies
- Wallabies Squad Nations Championship Tour – 2026 Angus Bell, Nick Champion de Crespigny and Harry Potter
- Wallabies Squad Japan Series - 2026 Angus Bell and Harry Potter
- Wallabies A Squad USA Tour - 2026 Ethan Dobbins, Eamon Doyle, Tom Lambert and Tom Robertson
- Wallabies Squad Nations Cup Spring Tour - 2026 Angus Bell, Tom Lambert and Harry Potter

=== Rugby World Cup Winners ===
- Bob Egerton – 1991
- Nick Farr-Jones (Captain) – 1991
- Richard Harry – 1999

== Women's Rugby "Lionesses" ==
The Club has produced 13 Australian Female Representatives of which 11 are Wallaroos; our most recent debutant is Piper Duck (October 2022 v Scotland during the Rugby World Cup in New Zealand).

- Wallaroos Squad – 2026 Emily Chancellor, Brittany Merlo# and Bridie O'Gorman
- # Uncapped Player

Lionesses were Joint Australian Club Champions 2025

== Super Rugby players 2027 ==
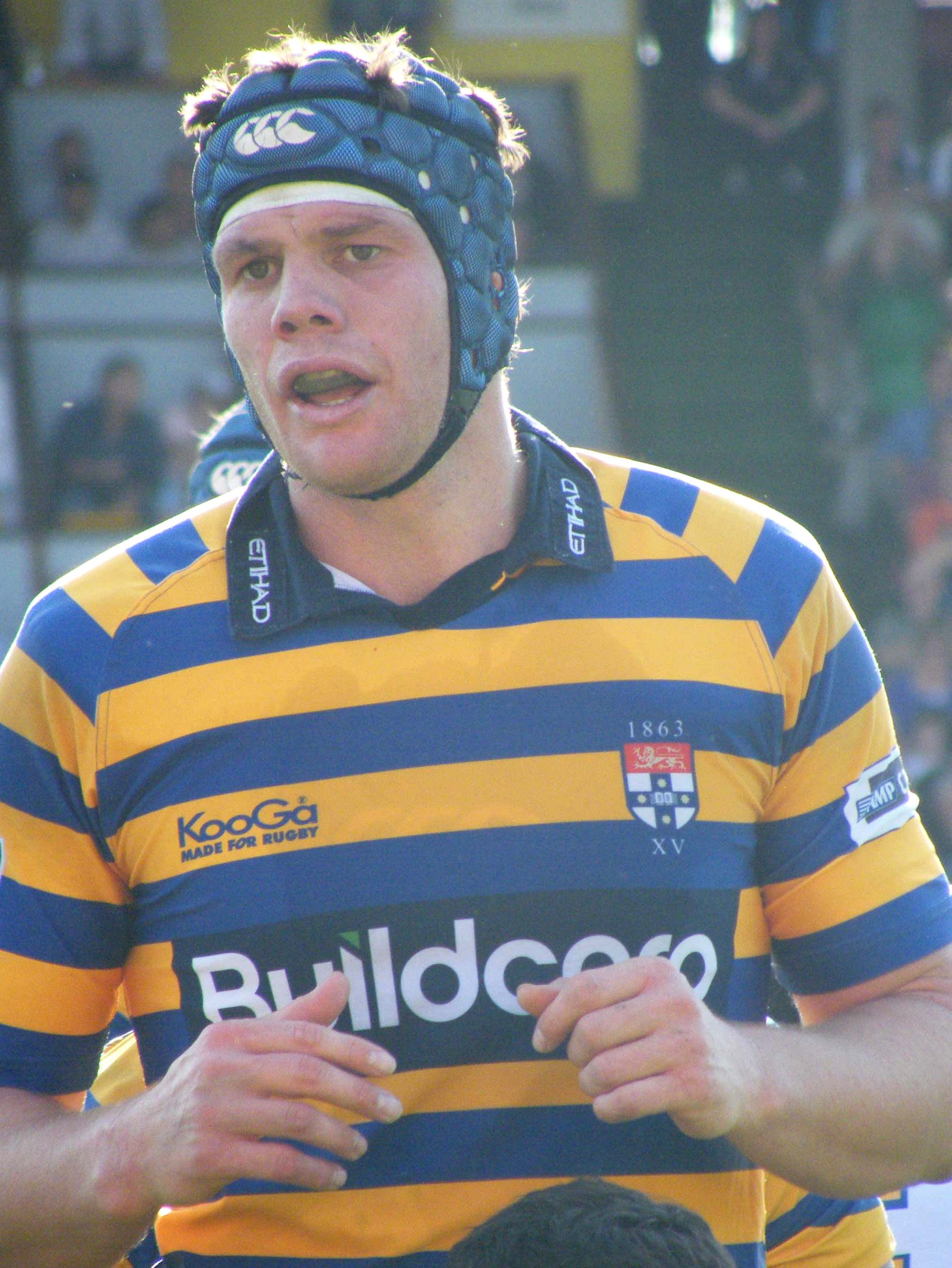
Will Caldwell playing for Sydney University

* Darcy Breen – ACT Brumbies
- Daniel Botha – NSW Waratahs
- Ethan Dobbins – NSW Waratahs
- Eamon Doyle – NSW Waratahs
- Folau Fainga'a – NSW Waratahs
- Bernard Foley – NSW Waratahs
- Jake Gordon – NSW Waratahs
- Clem Halaholo – NSW Waratahs
- Nick Phipps – NSW Waratahs
- Matt Philip - Captain – NSW Waratahs
- George Poolman – NSW Waratahs
- Harry Potter – NSW Waratahs
- Leafi Talataina – NSW Waratahs
- Tom Lambert – Qld Reds
- Nick Champion de Crespigny - Western Force
- Boston Fakafanua - Western Force
- Harry Johnson-Holmes – Western Force
- Rohan Leahy - Western Force
- Henry Robertson – Western Force
- Tom Robertson – Western Force

== Super W players 2026 ==
- Ruby Anderson - Waratahs
- Emily Chancellor – Waratahs Captain
- Brianna Hoy – Waratahs
- Brittany Merlo - Waratahs
- Bridie O'Gorman – Waratahs
- Millie Parker - Waratahs
- Adiana Talakai – Waratahs
- Siusiuosalafai Volkman -Waratahs
- Grace Freeman – Force
- Sera Naiqama – Force
- Lori Cramer - Reds

* Denotes Uncapped
