= Lachlan McCaffrey =

Australian rugby union player

- Born: Lachlan Patrick McCaffrey; 17 March 1990 (age 36) Sydney, New South Wales, Australia
- Height: 1.94 m (6 ft 4 1/2 in)
- Weight: 108 kg (17 st 0 lb)
- School: Saint Ignatius' College, Riverview

Rugby union career
- Position(s): Flanker, Number 8
Senior career
| Years | Team | Apps | (Points) |
| 2014–2015 | London Welsh | 17 | (5) |
| 2015–2017 | Leicester Tigers | 47 | (25) |
| 2020–2021 | Kyuden Voltex | 3 | (0) |
| 2021–2022 | Austin Gilgronis | 16 | (25) |
- Correct as of 13 February 2024
Super Rugby
| Years | Team | Apps | (Points) |
| 2010 | Waratahs | 1 | (0) |
| 2012–2013 | Force | 7 | (0) |
| 2014 | Brumbies | 8 | (5) |
| 2018–2020 | Brumbies | 34 | (30) |
- Correct as of 17 August 2021
International career
| Years | Team | Apps | (Points) |
| 2010 | Australia U20 | 2 | (5) |
- Correct as of 12 June 2021
Coaching career
- Years: Team
- 2024: Otago (Assistant coach)
- 2025–: Waratahs (Assistant coach)
- Correct as of 13 August 2026

Lachlan Patrick McCaffrey (born 17 March 1990) is an Australian rugby union coach and former player. His regular playing position is flanker. Between 2010 and 2014 McCaffrey played 16 matches in the Super Rugby for the Waratahs, Force and Brumbies, respectively. After stints in England with London Welsh and the Leicester Tigers, where he racked up almost 70 appearances, McCaffrey returned to the Super Rugby, playing three seasons for the Brumbies where his performances in the latter seasons led to rumours of national selection for the Australia.

== Career ==
McCaffrey was part of the Brumbies Extended Playing squad, having previously represented the Western Force in Super Rugby. He joined the Perth-based side ahead of the 2012 Super Rugby season and is awaiting his first-team debut. He previously played of the Waratahs. McCaffrey went to Saint Ignatius' College, Riverview in Sydney, and also plays for Eastwood in the Sydney Shute Shield grade rugby competition.

McCaffrey was a member of the Australia under 20 team that competed in the 2010 IRB Junior World Championship.

He moved to English Premiership side London Welsh prior to the 2014–15 season. On 5 May 2015, Lachlan signed for Leicester Tigers for the upcoming 2015–16 season.

== Coaching career ==
In May 2024, it was reported that McCaffrey had taken up an assistant coaching role with Otago in New Zealand's National Provincial Championship (NPC) for their 2024 season. Before the first round of the season, McCaffrey was announced to join the coaching staff of the Waratahs ahead of their 2025 season, being the defence coach alongside Mike Catt and Dan Palmer.

In the inaugural Super Rugby AUS competition, McCaffrey overtook coaching responsibilities from head coach Dan McKellar, leading the team to their maiden Super Rugby AUS title. He was confirmed to coach the team again in the following years tournament.

== Politics ==
He contested the Division of Bennelong at the 2013 Australian federal election for the Democratic Labour Party. He won 0.70% of the vote, incumbent conservative MP John Alexander easily retained the seat.
