= Jimmy Hendren =

Australian rugby union player (born 2003)

James Hendren
- Born: 22 January 2003 (age 23) Sydney, New South Wales, Australia
- Height: 189 cm (6 ft 2 in)
- Weight: 93.5 kg (206 lb; 14 st 10 lb)
- School: St Joseph's College, Hunters Hill

Rugby union career
- Position(s): Fullback, Wing
- Current team: Waratahs
Youth career
- 2023–2025: Waratahs Academy
Amateur team(s)
Years	Team	Apps	(Points)
2021–	Randwick	15	(20)
Senior career
Years	Team	Apps	(Points)
2026–	Waratahs	3	(0)
- Correct as of 17 June 2026

James Hendren (born 22 January 2003), known as Jimmy Hendren, is an Australian rugby union player who plays as a fullback for the Waratahs in the Super Rugby. Hendren has also played on the wing.

== Early career ==
Hendren was born in Sydney, New South Wales, Australia and educated at St Joseph's College, Hunters Hill. While at school he was selected in the 2019 "NSW I U16 Gen Blue" squad, a training program with the New South Wales Waratahs. In 2021 Hendren began playing for the senior Randwick squad in Sydney's Shute Shield competition, and was also selected in the "NSW II Gen Blue U18s" squad.

In late 2023 The Daily Telegraph reported that Hendren had been in the Waratahs system, with Australian rugby website Rugby News reporting in 2024 that the Waratahs were keen to hold on to him after his significant performances in the Shute Shield and interest from New Zealand's National Provincial Championship (NPC). The website stated: "Hendren has been involved in the Waratahs' program for the past two seasons and Rugby News understands they want to hold onto him and see him as a long-term investment."

In 2023 Hendren was selected in the Australian under-20s wider training squad ahead of the 2023 World Rugby U20 Championship. He was later cut from the squad due to injury.

== Career ==
Hendren was named in the Waratahs' squad for the inaugural 2025 Super Rugby AUS competition, a short-format, domestic rugby union competition featuring Australia's four Super Rugby franchises.

Hendren started at fullback for the Waratahs in the first round defeat to the Force. In the second round the Waratahs faced off against arch-rivals the Queensland Reds. Hendren was once again named as the starting fullback. He scored the first try of the match, which was played in Narrabri, and finished with four tries overall. The Waratahs won 47–19, sealing their first win of the competition.

In February 2026, ahead of the first round of the 2026 Super Rugby season, Hendren was selected in the teams squad by coach Dan McKellar over Test-capped fullback Andrew Kellaway. Hendren made his professional Super Rugby debut for the Waratahs against arch-rivals the Queensland Reds on 13 February 2026 in their first round clash. Starting at No. 15, the Waratahs won the match 36–12 at the Sydney Football Stadium, with teammate Max Jorgensen scoring a double.
