= Max Burey =

Australian rugby union player (born 1999)

- Born: 25 February 1999 (age 27) Wagga Wagga, New South Wales, Australia
- Height: 1.78 m (5 ft 10 in)
- Weight: 90 kg (198 lb; 14 st 2 lb)
- School: Holy Cross College

Rugby union career
- Position(s): Fly-half, Fullback
- Current team: Waratahs
Amateur team(s)
Years	Team	Apps	(Points)
2021–2023	Northern Suburbs	26	(18)
Senior career
Years	Team	Apps	(Points)
2023–2026	Force	33	(75)
2027–	Waratahs	0	(0)
- Correct as of 1 July 2026
National sevens team
Years	Team		Comps
2022–2023	Australia		4
- Correct as of 4 February 2026

Max Burey (born 25 February 1999) is an Australian rugby union player who plays for the Waratahs in the Super Rugby. Burey's primary position is fly-half, although he frequently plays fullback.

== Career ==
=== Youth and sevens ===
Burey has represented Northern Suburbs club in Sydney's Shute Shield competition since he was a teenager. He had previously trained with the Western Force, but didn't earn a contract, and instead represented the Australian sevens team. He had previously played rugby league before converting to union.

=== Force ===
Burey was called into the Force side for their eleventh round match against the Crusaders of the 2023 season. Kicking one conversion and two penalty goals, the Force lost 13–48 in Christchurch. Burey went on to start in every remaining Force fixture of the season, scoring a try in their final round match against the Chiefs, his first senior try. In June 2023, he re-signed for the side until 2025.

Burey was named as the Force's secondary playmaker in their inaugural Super Rugby AUS squad, announced in August 2025. Burey started every match of the four-game campaign, scoring three tries and contributing 30 points overall as the side secured a runners-up finish. Burey was later named Player of the Tournament, the first in the competition's history.

=== Waratahs ===
In April and May 2026, Burey was cited in The Sydney Morning Herald and The Australian as having transferred to Australian rival club of the Force, the Sydney-based Waratahs. The Force confirmed in June that Burey had departed the club, although no official confirmation was made public.

At the time of Burey's signing, the Waratahs had experienced significant turnover at fly-half, with multiple players moving through the role. The side had also faced challenges with player availability, squad depth, establishing a consistent first-choice No. 10, and developing continuity in the playmaking partnership with the scrum-half. Burey became the third fly-half to sign with the Waratahs in as many years (following Lawson Creighton and Jack Debreczeni), with exits of various players, including Ben Donaldson and Tane Edmed. Such were the issues at the team, in February 2026 The Sydney Morning Herald wrote: "The Waratahs No.10 jersey is one of the most scrutinised in Australian rugby, and the wearer has become like a referee: if they come off after a game and no one is talking about them, then it was a job well done."

In June 2026, with one year still left on his contract, Waratahs head coach Dan McKellar resigned, effective immediately. Earlier in the season, McKellar confirmed that all three Waratahs contracted fly-halves were to prove their right to stay at the team beyond 2026.

In August 2026, Burey was finally confirmed as the Waratahs' latest signing, joining on a two-year deal ahead of their 2027 season. After initially being left out of the Waratahs squad for the 2026 Super Rugby AUS competition due to a contract dispute between the Waratahs and Force, Burey was later admitted into the team and named in their starting squad in the first round.

== Career statistics ==
=== Club ===
As of 23 June 2026.

Statistics by club, season and competition
Club	Season	League							Other						Total					
Club	Season	Division	Apps	Tries	Con.	Pen.	Drop	Points	Apps	Tries	Con.	Pen.	Drop	Points	Apps	Tries	Con.	Pen.	Drop	Points
Force	2023	Super Rugby Pacific	5	1	12	5	0	44	—						5	1	12	5	0	44
Force	2024	Super Rugby Pacific	9	1	0	0	0	5	—						9	1	0	0	0	5
Force	2025	Super Rugby Pacific	11	0	2	3	0	13	5 (Note: Includes matches in the 2025 Lions tour and 2025 Super Rugby AUS.)	3	6	1	0	30	16	3	8	4	0	43
Force	2026	Super Rugby Pacific	8	1	4	0	0	13	—						8	1	4	0	0	13
Force	Total		33	3	18	8	0	75	5	3	6	1	0	30	38	6	24	9	0	105

== Awards and honours ==
Individual

- Super Rugby AUS Player of the Tournament: 2025
- Super Rugby AUS Team of the Season: 2025
