= Clem Halaholo =

Australian rugby union player

- Full name: Clement Halaholo
- Born: 22 September 2003 (age 23) Sydney, New South Wales, Australia
- Height: 193 cm (6 ft 4 in)
- Weight: 104 kg (229 lb; 16 st 5 lb)
- School: Waverley College
- Notable relative: Davvy Moale (cousin)

Rugby union career
- Position(s): Lock, Flanker
- Current team: Waratahs, Southland
Youth career
- –2021: Waverley College
- –2021: Sydney University
- 2021–2024: Waratahs Academy
Amateur team(s)
Years	Team	Apps	(Points)
2021–	Sydney University		
Senior career
Years	Team	Apps	(Points)
2025–	Waratahs	16	(30)
2026–	Southland	1	(5)
- Correct as of 1 August 2026

Clement Halaholo (born 22 September 2003) is an Australian rugby union player, who plays for the Waratahs in the Super Rugby and Southland in the New Zealand National Provincial Championship (NPC). His preferred position is lock or flanker.

== Early career ==
Halaholo was born in Sydney. He attended Waverley College where he first played rugby. In his youth, Halaholo also played rugby league, being in the Sydney Roosters academy. He plays his club rugby for Sydney University, and studied business at the International Sports College and works on construction. He was named as a later call-up to the Junior Wallabies in 2023, although he did not make an appearance.

== Career ==
Halaholo was named in the Waratahs squad ahead of the 2025 Super Rugby Pacific season, however he did not make an appearance and in June 2025 was released by the side. He was later named in the Waratahs squad for the 2025 Super Rugby AUS competition, having a break out competition. He scored three tries in all three of his appearances, including the grand final, for which he was named Man of the Match. Halaholo was also named in the inaugural Team of the Year.

After starting both trial games ahead of the 2026 Super Rugby Pacific season, Halaholo was named to start against the Reds in round one, scoring a try on debut. In June 2026, Halaholo signed a one-year contract extension with the Waratahs.

Following the end of the 2026 Super Rugby season, Halaholo signed for the Southland Stags in New Zealand's National Provincial Championship (NPC) for their 2026 season. Being named as the starting blindside flanker, Halaholo scored a try on debut, coming in the 33rd minute of the opening round. Southland lost their opening match to arch-rivals Otago in what was their 250th matchup.

== Personal life ==
Halaholo enjoys music and plays the piano, learning throughout 2022. Halaholo is the cousin of National Rugby League (NRL) player and Cook Islands representative Davvy Moale.

== Career statistics ==
=== Club ===
As of 1 August 2026.

Statistics by club, season and competition
Club	Season	League			
Club	Season	Division	Apps	Tries	Points
Waratahs	2025	Super Rugby AUS	3	3	15
Waratahs	2026	Super Rugby Pacific	13	3	15
Waratahs	Total		16	6	30
Southland	2026	National Provincial Championship	1	1	5
Career total			17	7	35

== Awards and honours ==
Waratahs

- Super Rugby AUS: 2025

Individual

- Super Rugby AUS Team of the Season: 2025
