= Oniti Finau =

Australian rugby union player

- Born: 7 April 2004 (age 22) Auckland, New Zealand
- Height: 177 cm (5 ft 10 in)
- Weight: 105 kg (231 lb; 16 st 7 lb)
- School: Barker College

Rugby union career
- Position: Hooker
- Current team: Waratahs
Senior career
Years	Team	Apps	(Points)
2026–	Waratahs	1	(0)
- Correct as of 16 May 2026
International career
Years	Team	Apps	(Points)
2024	Australia U20	1	(0)
- Correct as of 16 May 2026

Oniti Finau (born 7 April 2004) is an Australian rugby union player, who plays for the Waratahs. His preferred position is hooker.

== Early career ==
Finau was born in Auckland, New Zealand, but moved to Australia as a child where he attended Barker College. He earned Australia Schools selection in 2022, before injury ruled him out for a year in 2023. A member of the Waratahs academy, he earned selection for the Australia U20 side in 2024. He plays his club rugby for Randwick.

== Professional career ==
Finau's performances at club level earned him selection for the Waratahs squad for the 2025 Super Rugby AUS competition. He was then called into the Waratahs squad for Round 14 of the 2026 Super Rugby Pacific season, where he would make his debut as a replacement against the Drua.
