= Daniel Botha =

Australian rugby union player

- Born: 2002 (age 23–24) Sydney, New South Wales, Australia
- Height: 188 cm (6 ft 2 in)
- Weight: 120 kg (265 lb; 18 st 13 lb)
- School: The Scots College
- University: University of Sydney
- Notable relative: Chris Botha (father)

Rugby union career
- Position: Prop
- Current team: Waratahs
Youth career
- Mosman Junior Rugby Club
Amateur team(s)
Years	Team	Apps	(Points)
2020–2023	Sydney University		
Senior career
Years	Team	Apps	(Points)
2023–	Waratahs	34	(0)
2026–	Northland	3	(0)

Daniel Botha (born 2002) is an Australian rugby union player, who plays for the Waratahs. His preferred position is prop.

== Early career ==
Botha was born in 2002 in Sydney, New South Wales, Australia, to Zimbabwean former international rugby union player, Chris Botha, and Zambian-born mother Natalie. Chris, a second rower, represented Zimbabwe at the 1991 Rugby World Cup.

Botha attended The Scots College. He was a member of the Waratahs academy since leaving school and played his club rugby for Sydney University, where he earned Junior Wallabies selection.

== Professional career ==
Botha was called into the Waratahs squad ahead of Round 2 of the 2023 Super Rugby Pacific season. He made his debut in this match against the Drua, before making a further 8 appearances in the season. He was announced as signing full-time for the Waratahs in October 2023. He was named in the Waratahs squad for the 2024 Super Rugby Pacific season.
