= Leafi Talataina =

Australian rugby union player

- Full name: Leafi Heka Talataina
- Born: 18 January 2004 (age 22) Melbourne, Australia
- Height: 196 cm (6 ft 5 in)
- Weight: 120 kg (265 lb; 18 st 13 lb)

Rugby union career
- Position: Flanker
- Current team: Waratahs
Senior career
Years	Team	Apps	(Points)
2024	Rebels	0	(0)
2025–2026	Waratahs	13	(0)
- Correct as of 27 May 2026
International career
Years	Team	Apps	(Points)
2023	Australia U20	5	(5)
- Correct as of 8 March 2025

Leafi Talataina (born 18 January 2004) is an Australian rugby union player, who plays for the Waratahs. His preferred position is flanker.

== Early career ==
Talataina was born in Melbourne and attended Fountain Gate Secondary College. He was a member of the Melbourne Rebels academy, He plays his club rugby for Sydney University, and in 2023 and 2024 was selected to play for the Australia U20 side.

== Professional career ==
Talataina first signed professionally with the Rebels ahead of the 2023 Super Rugby Pacific season, but did not make an appearance for the side. In September 2024, it was announced he had signed for the Waratahs, and in November 2024 he was confirmed in the squad for the 2025 Super Rugby Pacific season. He made his Super Rugby debut for the Waratahs in Round 4 of the season, coming on as a replacement against the Force.
