= Apolosi Ranawai =

Fijian rugby union player

- Born: 16 April 1994 (age 32) Nadi, Fiji
- Height: 183 cm (6 ft 0 in)
- Weight: 135 kg (298 lb; 21 st 4 lb)
- School: Nasinu Secondary School

Rugby union career
- Position: Prop
- Current team: Waratahs
Senior career
Years	Team	Apps	(Points)
2026–	Waratahs	5	(15)
- Correct as of 30 May 2026
International career
Years	Team	Apps	(Points)
2014	Fiji U20	5	(0)
- Correct as of 1 May 2026

Apolosi Ranawai (born 16 April 1994) is a Fijian rugby union player, who plays for the Waratahs. His preferred position is prop.

== Early career ==
Ranawai was born in Nadi and played his club rugby for Korovuto Rugby Club. He attended Nasinu Secondaryl where he helped the school reach the final in the Deans Trophy in 2012. In 2014, he represented the Fiji U20 national side, before moving to Australia to further his rugby career. He joined the Northern Suburbs in the Shute Shield competition, where he was named in the team of the season in 2025.

== Professional career ==
Ranawai's performances at club level earned him selection for the Waratahs squad for the 2025 Super Rugby AUS competition. Following his performances in the competition, he was then named in the squad for the 2026 Super Rugby Pacific season. He made his debut for the side in Round 12 of the competition against the Force, coming on as a replacement.
