= Hamish Muller =

Australian rugby union player

- Born: Australia
- Height: 195 cm (6 ft 5 in)
- School: Toowoomba Grammar School
- University: University of Queensland

Rugby union career
- Position: Lock / Flanker
- Current team: Reds
Senior career
Years	Team	Apps	(Points)
2026–	Reds	12	(0)
- Correct as of 6 June 2026

Hamish Muller is an Australian rugby union player, who plays for the Reds in the Super Rugby. His preferred position is lock or flanker.

== Early career ==
Australian-born, Muller grew up in Clifton and originally played Polocrosse before switching to rugby as a teenager. He attended Toowoomba Grammar School where he continued to play rugby and captained the school side. He plays his club rugby for the Brothers club. He had previously represented Queensland at U15 and U16 level before attending the University of Queensland.

== Professional career ==
Muller was first named in the Reds squad for the 2025 Super Rugby AUS competition. He had previously debuted against Saitama Wild Knights in November 2024. He was then named in the Reds squad for the 2026 Super Rugby Pacific season. He made his debut for the Reds in Round 3 of the season against the Highlanders.
