= Chris Hickey =

Chris Hickey is a professional rugby union coach and the former coach of the NSW Waratahs in the Super Rugby tournament.

== Early coaching career ==
Chris Hickey first started his coaching career in 1992 with the First Grade Ballina Seahorses rugby union club in the Far North Coast rugby union competition. Taking the Ballina rugby union club to its first ever premiership title since the formation of the club in 1976. Chris Hickey then took on the coaching director role of the ACT Vikings Rugby Club where he took them to six grand finals and secured three championships. He then joined the Eastwood Rugby Club in 2001 where he led them to back-to-back championships in 2001 and 2002. In addition to his duties at Eastwood, he coached the NSW 'A' team in 2003, and the Australian Under-21 team in 2005 and 2006.

== Waratahs ==
His success with club rugby led to his hiring as the Waratahs head coach for the 2009 Super Rugby season, replacing Ewen McKenzie.

His tenure was met with vocal criticisms from fans who felt that his team often engaged in negative tactics and "aimless kicking". Despite the criticisms, statistics showed that the Waratahs scored the most tries in 2011 super rugby season with 46 tries from 16 games. The 2011 season was further marred by injurities to numerous players, backroom squander and financial losses due to poor attendance.

Following the conclusion of the season, Hickey decided not to seek a contract extension believing that it was time for change. He was succeeded by his assistant Michael Foley

He leaves with a 63.34% winning percentage, an all-time record among Waratahs coaches, as well as finishing first of all Australian Super Rugby teams in the 2009 and 2010 with 5th and 3rd respectively.
