= Jarrah McLeod =

Australian rugby union player

- Born: 31 May 2004 (age 22) Moruya, New South Wales, Australia
- Height: 186 cm (6 ft 1 in)
- Weight: 105 kg (231 lb; 16 st 7 lb)
- School: Knox Grammar School

Rugby union career
- Position: Centre
- Current team: Brumbies
Senior career
Years	Team	Apps	(Points)
2026–	Brumbies	1	(0)
- Correct as of 30 May 2026
International career
Years	Team	Apps	(Points)
2024	Australia U20	5	(5)
2025	First Nations & Pasifika XV	1	(0)
- Correct as of 7 February 2026
National sevens team
Years	Team		Comps
2026–	Australia		1
- Correct as of 7 February 2026

Jarrah McLeod (born 31 May 2004) is an Australian rugby union player, who plays for the Brumbies in the Super Rugby. His preferred position is centre.

== Early career ==
McLeod is from Nowra in New South Wales. He attended Knox Grammar School where he played rugby league as well as rugby union. After leaving school he was a member of the South Sydney Rabbitohs and Canterbury Bulldogs academies, before returning to union joining the Brumbies academy, while also working as a labourer. He plays his club rugby for the Canberra Royals. In 2024, he represented the Australia U20 national side. McLeod is of Yuin aboriginal descent.

== Professional career ==
McLeod debuted professionally when he represented the First Nations & Pasifika XV side against the British & Irish Lions during the 2025 tour. Following this fixture, he was announced as signing with the Brumbies ahead of the 2026 Super Rugby Pacific season. He would also represent the Brumbies in the 2025 Super Rugby AUS competition. In 2026, McLeod would debut for the Australia Sevens side at the 2026 Australia Sevens.
