= Will Cartwright (rugby union) =

Australian rugby player

- Born: 26 March 2003 (age 23) Brisbane, Australia
- Height: 1.76 m (5 ft 9 in)
- Weight: 77 kg (170 lb)

Rugby union career
- Position: Scrum-half
Senior career
Years	Team	Apps	(Points)
2024-	Queensland Reds		
National sevens team
Years	Team		Comps
2025-	Australia		

Will Cartwright (born 26 March 2003) is an Australian rugby union player who plays for Queensland Reds and the Australia national rugby sevens team.

== Club career ==
From Queensland, Cartwright played club rugby for Brothers Rugby Club, in the Queensland Premier League, and can play at half-back, or wing. He made his debut for the Queensland Reds against the touring Wales national side in July 2024, and subsequently scored a try against the Western Force in Super Rugby AUS.

== International career ==
Having been invited to an Australia Sevens Combine event in September 2025, the following month, he signed a full-time contract on the national sevens team. Playing for the Australia national rugby sevens team he scored three tries from the first five matches of the 2025-26 SVNS season, including a brace against France in the semi-final before he played New Zealand in his first final at the 2025 Dubai Sevens in November 2025.
