= Luke Reimer =

Australian rugby union player

- Born: 27 May 2000 (age 26) New South Wales, Australia
- Height: 187 cm (6 ft 2 in)
- Weight: 102 kg (225 lb; 16 st 1 lb)
- School: Barker College

Rugby union career
- Position: Flanker
- Current team: Brumbies
Youth career
- Lindfield Junior Rugby Club
Senior career
Years	Team	Apps	(Points)
2021–2026	Brumbies	74	(90)
- Correct as of 5 June 2026
International career
Years	Team	Apps	(Points)
2024–	Australia	1	(0)
2024–2025	Australia A	2	(10)
- Correct as of 18 October 2025

Luke Reimer (born 27 May 2000) is an Australian rugby union player who plays as a flanker for the Brumbies in the Super Rugby and the Australia national team.

== Early life ==
Luke Reimer grew up in Killara and played for Lindfield Junior Rugby Club and attended primary school at Lindfield East Public School (LEPS) in Sydney, New South Wales. He attended Barker College graduating in 2018.

== Career ==
He was named in the Brumbies squad for the 2021 Super Rugby AU season. He made his debut in the qualifying final of the 2021 Super Rugby AU season in the match against the Force.

In 2018, Reimer was awarded the "Bronze Boot Award". It is awarded to one player from each team ‘For the most constructive player in a Schools Test series’. It is now seen as the most prestigious award for test matches between the Australian and New Zealand Schoolboys

In January 2026, the it was announced that at the conclusion of the 2026 Super Rugby Pacific season, Reimer would be moving to the Waratahs in 2027 on a two-year deal, reconnecting with the rival teams coach Dan McKellar. The Brumbies were reported to have a salary cap squeeze to keep Reimer from leaving the club, as the Waratahs had been in pursuit of Reimer since around Christmas Day (25 December) 2025. Commenting on the signing, Reimer stated: "I will forever be grateful for my time in this great city and will always treasure being part of the Brumbies family. I remain fully committed and focused to giving my best for the team in 2026 and will leave no stone unturned in my preparation and performance. As I move into this new chapter at the Waratahs, I'm looking forward to the opportunity to reconnect and work with the coach who gave me my first shot at my dream. I am excited for this homecoming to Sydney and keen to play my part in strengthening Australian rugby."
