= Henry Palmer (rugby union) =

Australian rugby union player

- Born: 5 July 2003 (age 23) Cambridge, Cambridgeshire, England
- Height: 178 cm (5 ft 10 in)
- School: Hamilton Boys' High School

Rugby union career
- Position: Wing
- Current team: Force
Senior career
Years	Team	Apps	(Points)
2026–	Force	1	(5)
- Correct as of 6 February 2026
National sevens team
Years	Team		Comps
2023–2025	Australia		8
- Correct as of 6 February 2026

Henry Palmer (born 5 July 2003) is an Australian rugby union player, who plays for the Force in the Super Rugby. His preferred position is wing.

== Early career ==
Palmer was born in Cambridge, Cambridgeshire, England, but spent his childhood in France, as well as Sydney and Bathurst, Australia. He moved to New Zealand for his last two years of schooling, attending Hamilton Boys' High School, before returning to Australia to join up with the Brumbies academy. He had originally played his club rugby for the Bathurst Bulldogs, before joining Easts in Sydney's Shute Shield.

== Professional career ==
Palmer debuted for the Australia Sevens side in 2023, debuting in the 2023 Dubai Sevens. He would go on to make a further 7 appearances for the sevens side. In September 2025, he was called into the Force squad for the 2025 Super Rugby AUS competition, and featured in their round three match against the Queensland Reds. Palmer scored a try on his professional debut for the team in the 34th minute of the match. The Force lost 22–47 en route to the Grand Final. In February 2026, he was named in the Force squad ahead of the 2026 Super Rugby Pacific season.

Palmer signed with English Champ Rugby side Cornish Pirates in July 2026.
