= Jack Barrett (rugby union) =

Australian rugby union player

- Born: 3 May 2004 (age 22) Australia
- Height: 185 cm (6 ft 1 in)
- Weight: 111 kg (245 lb; 17 st 7 lb)

Rugby union career
- Position: Prop
- Current team: Waratahs
Senior career
| Years | Team | Apps | (Points) |
| 2024– | Waratahs | 7 | (0) |
- Correct as of 30 May 2026
International career
| Years | Team | Apps | (Points) |
| 2023– | Australia U20 | 4 | (0) |
- Correct as of 31 March 2024

Jack Barrett (born 3 May 2004) is an Australian rugby union player, who plays for the Waratahs. His preferred position is prop.

== Early career ==
Barrett attended St Joseph's College, Hunters Hill having grown up in Lightning Ridge before moving to Coogee. Having come through the Waratahs academy, he joined Randwick. He represented the Junior Wallabies in 2023, before being named in the squad for 2024.

== Professional career ==
Barrett was called into the Waratahs squad ahead of Round 6 of the 2024 Super Rugby Pacific season, named as a late inclusion in the side to face the Rebels, starting the match.
