= Kye Oates =

Australian rugby union player (born 1999)

- Born: 1 September 1999 (age 27)
- Height: 1.80 m (5 ft 11 in)
- Weight: 90 kg (198 lb)
- University: University of Queensland

Rugby union career
- Position(s): Winger; Full-back
- Current team: ACT Brumbies
Senior career
Years	Team	Apps	(Points)
2025	Canberra Royals		
2026–	Brumbies	3	(0)
International career
Years	Team	Apps	(Points)
2019	Australia U20		
National sevens team
Years	Team		Comps
2022–	Australia 7s		
Medal record
Men's rugby union
Representing Australia
Oceania U20 Championship
Winner	2019 Gold Coast

Kye Oates (born 1 September 1999) is an indigenous Australian rugby union footballer who plays for Super Rugby club ACT Brumbies.

== Career ==
Oates is from Toowoomba in Central Queensland and attended University of Queensland where he played first-XV rugby union. He played for the Australia national under-20 rugby union team at the 2019 World Rugby Under 20 Championship.

Oates played for Australia national rugby sevens team, making his debut at the 2022 Hong Kong Sevens. He played at the Teuila International 7s in Samoa and the Coral Coast 7s in Fiji in 2024 as part of Lloyd McDermott Rugby Development Team.

He played for Canberra Royals and was part of the inaugural First Nations & Pasifika XV squad for their match against the British & Irish Lions in Melbourne, prior to signing a contract with Super Rugby club ACT Brumbies.

== Personal life ==
His brothers Chance and BJ played rugby union alongside him for Queensland, the first set of three indigenous brothers to play for the team together since Glen, Gary and Mark Ella.
