= Henry O'Donnell (rugby union) =

Australian rugby union player

- Born: 17 February 2003 (age 23) Mosman, New South Wales, Australia
- Height: 186 cm (6 ft 1 in)
- Weight: 97 kg (214 lb)
- School: Saint Ignatius' College, Riverview

Rugby union career
- Position: Centre
Super Rugby
Years	Team	Apps	(Points)
2024	Force	5	(0)
2025-	Waratahs	12	(5)

Henry O'Donnell (born 17 February 2003) is an Australian professional rugby union player.

Raised in Sydney, O'Donnell got his start in rugby with the Mosman juniors and was a first XV player for Saint Ignatius' College, Riverview. He pursued further studies at Sydney University and in 2022 was named the varsity side's "Most Promising Colt Player". In 2023, O'Donnell switched to Northern Suburbs and during the season was selected to represented the Junior Wallabies at the World Rugby U20 Championships in South Africa, where he scored four tries.

O'Donnell, a centre, relocated to Perth at the end of 2023 to play for the Western Force. He made his debut in round seven of the 2024 Super Rugby Pacific season, coming on from the bench against the Blues at Eden Park. Henry would go on to make 5 appearances for the Force before being released in September 2024.

He has signed for the Waratahs for the 2025 season.

== See also ==
- List of Western Force players
