= Isaac Aedo Kailea =

Australian rugby union player

- Born: 13 July 2000 (age 26) Melbourne, Victoria, Australia
- Height: 190 cm (6 ft 3 in)
- Weight: 129 kg (284 lb)
- School: Ringwood Secondary College

Rugby union career
- Position: Prop
- Current team: Waratahs
Youth career
- Harlequin Junior Rugby Club
Senior career
Years	Team	Apps	(Points)
2021–2024	Rebels	22	(5)
2025-	Waratahs	18	(15)
- Correct as of 30 May 2026
International career
Years	Team	Apps	(Points)
2024–	Australia	9	(5)
- Correct as of 30 August 2026

Isaac Aedo Kailea (born 13 July 2000) is an Australian professional rugby union player for Waratahs in Super Rugby Pacific. His playing position is prop.

He was named in the Rebels development squad for the 2021 Super Rugby AU season. He made his Rebels debut in Round 2 of the competition against the Reds, coming on as a replacement.

Following the Melbourne Rebels dissolution at the end of the 2024 Super Rugby season, Aedo Kailea joined NSW Waratahs for the 2025 season.

Aedo Kailea, born in Australia, is half-Tongan and half-Chilean.

== Super Rugby statistics ==
As of 1 June 2024.

Season	Team	Matches	Starts	Sub	Mins	Tries	Cons	Pens	Drops	Points	(yellow card) Yel	(red card) Red
2021 AU	Rebels	3	0	3	49	0	0	0	0	0	0	0
2021 TT	Rebels	0	0	0	0	0	0	0	0	0	0	0
2022	Rebels	2	0	2	30	0	0	0	0	0	0	0
2023	Rebels	4	0	4	88	0	0	0	0	0	0	0
2024	Rebels	13	6	7	575	1	0	0	0	5	0	0
Total		22	0	9	742	1	0	0	0	5	0	0

== International career ==
Aedo Kailea made his international debut on 6 July 2024 against Wales in Sydney on their 2024 tour of Australia. He played the first three tests of the 2024 international season for Australia, starting in the third test against Georgia.
