= Miles Amatosero =

Australian rugby union player

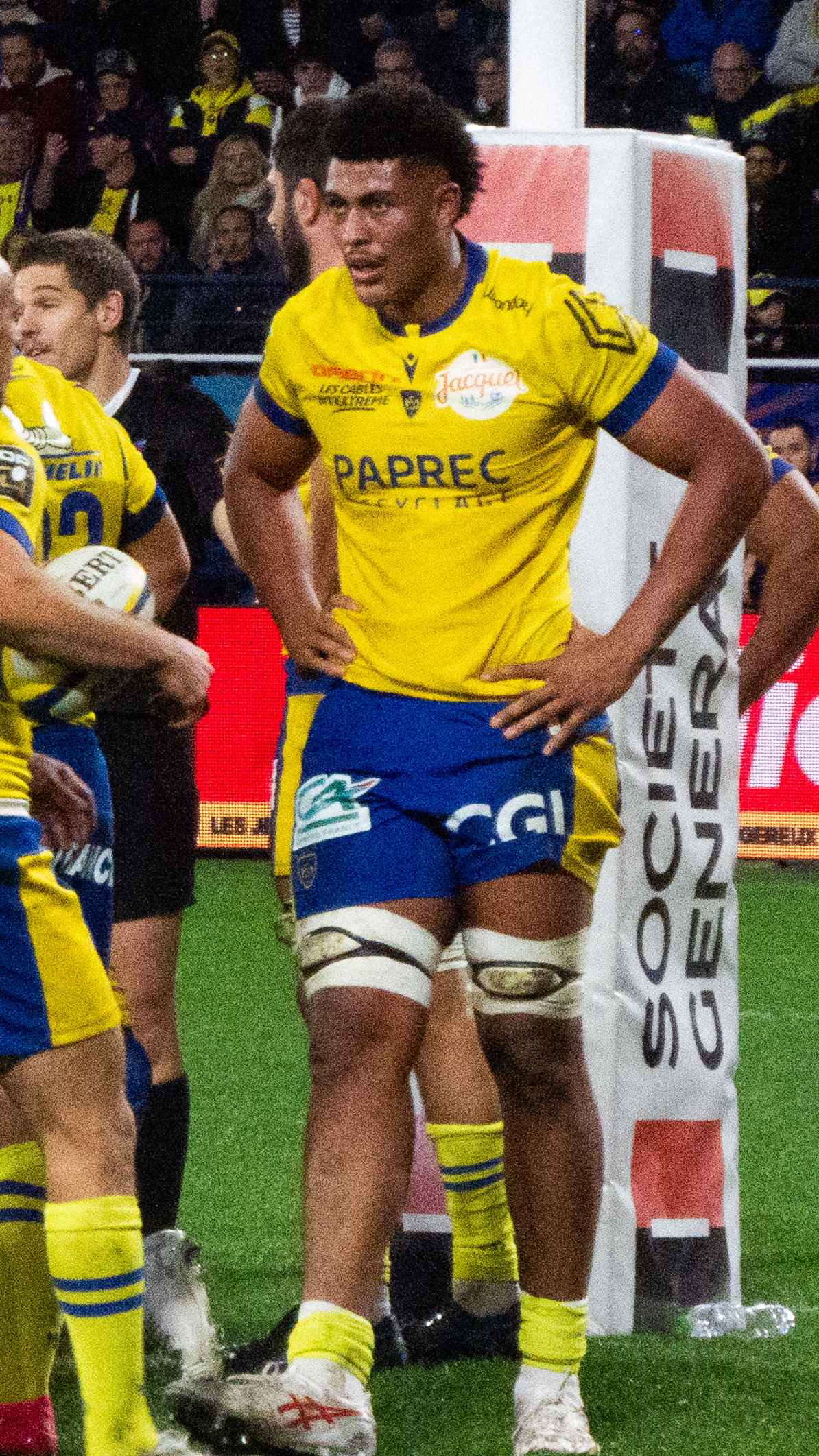
- Born: 15 June 2002 (age 24) Sydney, New South Wales, Australia
- Height: 203 cm (6 ft 8 in)
- Weight: 125 kg (276 lb; 19 st 10 lb)

Rugby union career
- Position: Lock
- Current team: Waratahs
Senior career
Years	Team	Apps	(Points)
2020–2023	Clermont	27	(0)
2024–	Waratahs	38	(5)
- Correct as of 30 May 2026
International career
Years	Team	Apps	(Points)
2026–	Australia	2	(0)
- Correct as of 8 August 2026

Miles Amatosero (born 15 June 2002) is an Australian rugby union player who currently plays as a lock for Super Rugby club the Waratahs.

== Early life ==
Amatosero was born in Sydney on 15 June 2002. He is of Nigerian descent through his father. Amatosero attended Waverley College where he began playing rugby. After finishing school, he moved to France to join Clermont on an Espoirs contract. Due to his size, he has earned comparisons to fellow Australian lock Will Skelton.

== Career ==
Amatosero moved to Clermont in 2020 on an Espoirs contract, He made his debut as an 18-year old, before making 27 appearances in total across 3 seasons for the first team. He returned to Australia in 2023, signing with the Waratahs for the 2024 season. He was named in the Waratahs squad for the 2024 Super Rugby Pacific season. He made 14 appearances for the Waratahs in the 2024 season.

== International career ==
In June 2026, Amatosero was named in the 37-man Australia squad for the 2026 Nations Championship tests. On 18 July 2026, Amatosero made his international debut for Australia in the third and final July test against Italy in Perth, coming on as a substitute for Jeremy Williams in the 57th minute. Australia secured an emphatic 57-10 victory, sending outgoing coach Joe Schmidt off in style.

On 8 August 2026, in a win against the Brave Blossoms, Amatosero was sent off with a yellow card for a shoulder to the head of Warner Dearns, which was later upgraded to a red.

== Awards and honours ==
Eastern Suburbs

- Shute Shield: 2022
