= Titi Nofoagatotoa =

Australian rugby union player

- Born: Auckland, New Zealand

Rugby union career
- Position(s): Lock, Flanker
- Current team: Force
Senior career
Years	Team	Apps	(Points)
2024–2026	Western Force	3	(0)
- Correct as of 24 May 2025

Titi Nofoagatotoa is an Australian rugby union player, who plays for the Force. His preferred position is lock or flanker. He was also part of the Australian u20s squad in 2022.

== Early career ==
Nofoagatotoa attended St Joseph's College, Nudgee where he played rugby. He moved to ACT to join the Brumbies academy after leaving school, and played his club rugby for Tuggeranong Vikings. He represented the Junior Wallabies in 2022.

== Professional career ==
Nofoagatotoa was called into the Force squad as a late call up to their side for Round 1 of the 2024 Super Rugby Pacific season. He made his debut in the same fixture.
