= Boston Fakafanua =

Australian rugby union player

- Born: 29 July 2005 (age 21) Kawakawa, New Zealand
- Height: 181 cm (5 ft 11 in)
- Weight: 93 kg (205 lb; 14 st 9 lb)
- School: The King's School, Parramatta

Rugby union career
- Position: Centre
- Current team: Force
Senior career
| Years | Team | Apps | (Points) |
| 2026– | Force | 1 | (0) |
- Correct as of 23 May 2026
International career
| Years | Team | Apps | (Points) |
| 2024–2025 | Australia U20 | 8 | (0) |
- Correct as of 23 May 2026

Boston Fakafanua (born 29 July 2005) is an Australian rugby union player, who plays for the Force. His preferred position is centre.

== Early career ==
Fakafanua was born in Kawakawa, New Zealand, but moved to Australia as a child where he attended The King's School, Parramatta. In 2023, he earned selection for the Australian Schools side, before representing the Australia U20 side in both 2024 and 2025. After leaving school, he had moved to the Perth area to represent the Force academy and Wests Scarborough at club level, but also represented Sydney University in the Shute Shield.

== Professional career ==
Fakafanua's performances at club level and in the Force academy earned him selection for the Force squad for the 2025 Super Rugby AUS competition. His performances earned him a professional contract and selection in the Force squad for the 2026 Super Rugby Pacific season. He made his debut for the side in Round 15 of the season against the Drua, coming on as a replacement.
