= Eamon Doyle =

Eamon Doyle or Eamonn Doyle (same pronunciation) may refer to:

- Eamon (singer) (Eamon Jonathan Doyle), American R&B and hip hop singer-songwriter and harmonicist
- Eamon N. Doyle, geologist for The Burren and the Cliffs of Moher, and painter, Ireland
- Eamonn Doyle, Irish photographer and music producer
