= Chris Botha (rugby union) =

- Full name: Chris Johannes Botha
- Born: 1 September 1968 (age 58) Salisbury, Rhodesia
- Height: 6 ft 3 in (191 cm)
- Weight: 215 lb (98 kg)

Rugby union career
- Position: Forward
International career
Years	Team	Apps	(Points)
1989–91	Zimbabwe	3	(4)

Chris Johannes Botha (born 1 September 1968) is a Zimbabwean former international rugby union player.

Born in Salisbury, Botha played his rugby as a forward and was a skilled line-out exponent.

Botha represented Zimbabwe at the 1991 Rugby World Cup, playing pool matches against Ireland and Japan.

In 1992, Botha joined London-based club Rosslyn Park and gained county representative honours with Surrey his first season, before suffering a serious knee ligament injury.
