= Super Rugby AUS =

Men's rugby union competition

- Current season, competition or edition: 2026 Super Rugby AUS
- Sport: Rugby union
- Founded: 2025; 1 year ago
- First season: 2025
- Organising body: Rugby Australia
- No. of teams: 4
- Country: Australia
- Headquarters: Sydney, New South Wales
- Most recent champion: Force (2026)
- Most titles: Force (1 title); Waratahs (1 title)
- Broadcaster: Stan Sport
- Related competitions: Super Rugby; NPC
- Website: rugby.com.au

The Super Rugby AUS (SRA) is a men's rugby union round-robin competition organised by Rugby Australia (RA). Established in 2025, it is the second-highest level of professional rugby in the country, behind Super Rugby.

== Background and history ==
Australia, unlike its "Tri-Nations" partners New Zealand and South Africa, has never had a consistent national professional rugby union competition below Super Rugby.

In 2012, Reds player Luke Morahan called for a national club competition as a means of bridging the gap between the semi-professional competitions in Sydney, Brisbane and the Australian Capital Territory, and Super Rugby. In 2014, a national professional club competition known as the National Rugby Championship (NRC) was formally established. Nine newly-created clubs played in a round-robin format across eight rounds, finishing with a four-team knockout stage to decide the season winners. The NRC was praised for improving Australia's player depth. However, in 2020, following the COVID-19 pandemic, the competition was disbanded.

In 2023, Force CEO Tony Lewis told The Sydney Morning Herald that an Australian third-tier competition was a necessity, stating: "All the Super coaches [in Australia] who participated in that third-tier comp [the NRC] that was running before COVID... all waxed lyrical about how good a competition it was and the number of coaches that come through it, and the number of S+C coaches [strength and conditioning], the number of analysts, the number of players. So it's just not about players, it's about coaches, about analysts, about physios. If you're not preparing them for the next level, the jump is horrendous. The first time you do economics, they do needs and wants."

It was speculated in October 2024 by Australian sports news-website The Roar that a new national club competition was in the works and would not be like its predecessors with newly-created teams across the country, but instead involve the four Australian Super Rugby teams (the Brumbies, the Force, the Reds and the Waratahs), and could possibly involve Japanese teams. It was revealed months later that a new "third-tier" competition was indeed in the making by Rugby Australia (RA). Announcing a competition could begin as early as 2025, RA CEO Phil Waugh stated to Rugby.com.au, "The biggest gap we've had over the last period of time has been (the) connection between the community game and professional game and how to bridge that gap. I think we're working on that. It's going to take time. There's no doubt that Super Rugby is too short in its current format so how do we fill that gap for those players that aren't in Test Rugby?"

In June 2025, it was confirmed that a national "third-tier" professional competition was launched by Rugby Australia. Known as Super Rugby AUS, the competition consists of the four Australian Super Rugby teams: the Brumbies, the Force, the Reds and the Waratahs, and its inaugural season took place between September and October 2025 across four weeks. The final two teams after three rounds (Force, Waratahs) met each other in a grand final, with the first-placed Force earning hosting rights. The Waratahs won 33–26.

In December 2025, it was reported by The Roar that three new teams from the Pacific nations of Fiji, Samoa, and Tonga could join the competition if a A$150 million partnership was signed between the Australian government's Department of Foreign Affairs and Trade (DFAT) and the governments of Fiji, Samoa, and Tonga. The Roar report stated that the deal was pending approval from the Prime Minister of Samoa Laʻauli Leuatea Schmidt, and had been in the works for six months.

== Teams ==
Locations of the 2025 Super Rugby AUS teams.

Team	Union	Established	Location	Region
Brumbies	ACT and Southern NSW Rugby Union	1995; 31 years ago	Canberra, Australian Capital Territory	Australian Capital Territory and Southern New South Wales
Force	Western Australia Rugby Union	2005; 21 years ago	Perth, Western Australia	Western Australia
Reds	Queensland Rugby Union	1882; 144 years ago	Brisbane, Queensland	Queensland
Waratahs	New South Wales Rugby Union	1882; 144 years ago	Sydney, New South Wales	Central and Northern New South Wales

== Champions ==
=== Grand Finals ===
List of Super Rugby AUS Grand Finals
Season	Winners	Score	Runners-up	Venue	Attendance
2025	Waratahs	33–26	Force	Kingsway Regional Sporting Complex, Wanneroo	—N/a
2026	Force	53–26	Waratahs	Hale School, Wembley Downs	—N/a

== Broadcasting and sponsorship ==
For its inaugural season, Super Rugby AUS was broadcast live on Stan Sport, Rugby Australia's broadcast partner since 2020. The competition was also streamed live from the online video platform YouTube.

== Awards ==
=== Team of the Season ===
At the conclusion of its inaugural edition, the Super Rugby AUS announced its Team of the Season. It included six Waratahs players, five Force players, three Reds players, and one Brumbies players.

=== Player of the Tournament ===
Announced in the Team of the Season award at the conclusion of the inaugural edition of the Super Rugby AUS was the Force's fly-half Max Burey. Alongside this accolade, Burey was also named as the inaugural Player of the Tournament. Burey throughout the four match competition made five linebreaks, scoring three tries, beating fifteen defenders and finished with the highest scoring tally with 30 points.

List of Player of the Year winners
Season	Player	Team	Ref.
2025	Max Burey	Force	
2026	Boston Fakafanua	Force	

== See also ==
- National Rugby Championship
- Australian Provincial Championship
