= Henry Robertson (rugby union) =

Australian rugby union player

- Born: 22 October 1999 (age 27) Australia
- Height: 180 cm (5 ft 11 in)
- Weight: 82 kg (181 lb; 12 st 13 lb)

Rugby union career
- Position: Scrum-half
- Current team: Western Force
Senior career
Years	Team	Apps	(Points)
2020–2022	Waratahs	7	(0)
2023–	Western Force	19	(10)
- Correct as of 09/05/2026
International career
Years	Team	Apps	(Points)
2019	Australia U20	5	(0)
- Correct as of 27 February 2021
Medal record
Men's rugby union
Representing Australia
Oceania U20 Championship
Winner	2019 Gold Coast
Junior World Cup
Runner-up	2019 Argentina

Henry Robertson (born 22 October 1999 in Australia) is an Australian rugby union player who plays for the Western Force in Super Rugby.

== Career ==
His playing position is scrum-half. He was named in the Waratahs squad for the 2021 Super Rugby AU season. He had previously been named in the Waratahs squads for the 2020 Super Rugby season, but didn't make any appearances. He made his debut for the Waratahs in Round 2 of the 2021 Super Rugby AU season against the Brumbies, coming on as a replacement.

In July 2022 it was announced by the Western Force that Robertson had signed a one year contract. In September 2024 the Western Force announced a further two year contract deal, extending Robertson's stay until 2026.
