= New South Wales Waratahs =

Rugby Union club based in Sydney, NSW, Australia

- Union: Rugby Australia (New South Wales)
- Nickname: Tahs
- Founded: 1882; 144 years ago (Note: Established in 1882, the clubs first match played during the Super Rugby era was in 1996.)
- Location: Sydney, New South Wales, Australia
- Region: New South Wales
- Ground: Sydney Football Stadium (Capacity: 42,500)
- Coach: Michael Cheika
- Captain: TBA
- Most appearances: Benn Robinson (151)
- Top scorer: Bernard Foley (1,092)
- Most tries: Israel Folau (60)
- League: Super Rugby Pacific
- 2026: 8th overall Playoffs: DNQ
Home kit	Away kit

Official website
- nsw.rugby

The New South Wales Waratahs (/ˈwɒrətɑːz/ or /ˌwɒrəˈtɑːz/;), often referred to as the Waratahs, are an Australian professional rugby union team based in Sydney that represents the majority of New South Wales (NSW) in the Super Rugby Pacific competition. The Waratahs play their home games at the new Sydney Football Stadium.

== History ==
=== Amateur era ===
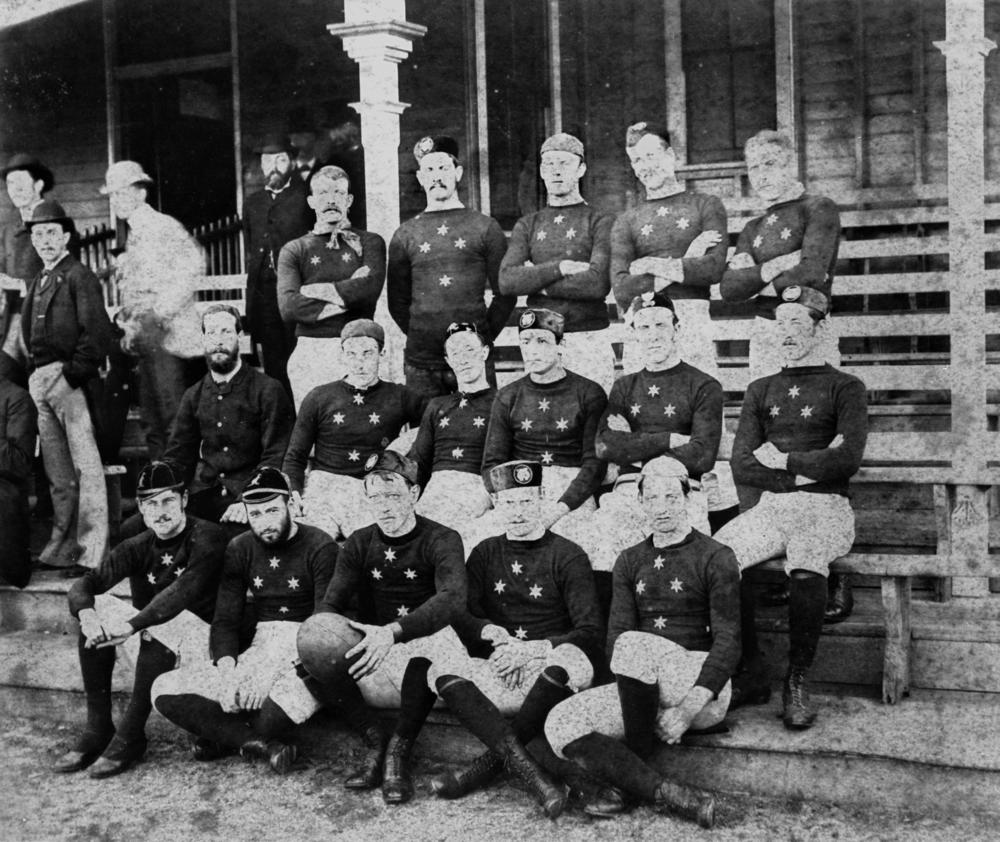
New South Wales team of 1883

The NSWRU (or then, The Southern RFU – SRFU) was established in 1874, and the very first club competition took place that year. By 1880 the SRU had over 100 clubs in its governance in the metropolitan area.

In 1882 the first NSW team (now Waratahs) was selected to play Queensland in a two-match series. The first NSW captain was James Brodie from Wallaroo FC, and NSW won both the games. That same year the first NSW touring squad was selected to go and play in New Zealand.

After using various jersey colours through the 1880s for the NSW representative XV, in 1891 the NSWRU changed to now traditional light blue jersey. In 1895, at the suggestion of Sydney's Moore Park based Wallaroo FC, a red waratah badge was permanently added to the NSW team jerseys. The NSW team were familiarly known as "the Blues" until a re-branding as "Waratahs" in 1991. Tours by the NSW team were first made to New Zealand in 1882, Queensland in 1883, Victoria in 1894 and Western Australia in 1907.

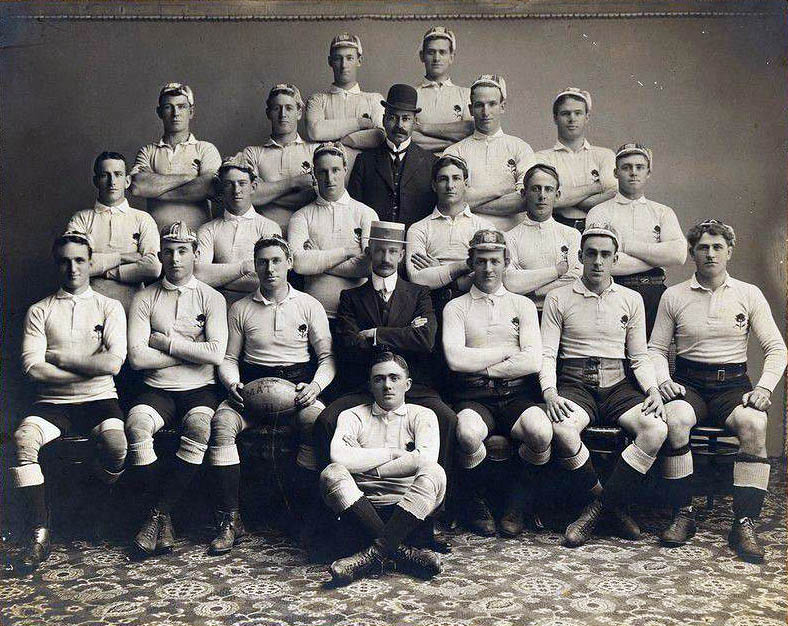
The 1906 New South Wales team

In 1907, several of the NSW rugby union team's players defected. They included the "superstar", Dally Messenger. These players joined the New South Wales rugby league team against a visiting rebel New Zealand rugby team. This was essentially the birth of rugby league in Australia.

During World War I, the NSW (and QLD) Rugby Unions ceased senior competition. The Queensland body however would not reform until 1929, which saw NSW have more responsibilities for Australian rugby. In 1921 a NSW selection toured New Zealand again, and out of their 10 fixtures, won nine games, including the Test.

The first and only (until 1991) NSW team be styled as "Waratahs" were the 1927/28 Waratahs who toured the United Kingdom, France and North America, introducing a style of open, running rugby never seen before, but which has been the stamp of the Australian game ever since. They won 24 and drew two of their 31 official matches. Seven members of this 1927/8 side were from the Drummoyne Rugby Club. Upon returning home, were greeted with a parade through Sydney and a reception at Town Hall. Matches against Queensland would soon resume also.

The 1930s were a particularly successful time for NSW. The height of the success of NSW is best represented by the defeat of the South African Springboks in 1937 at the SCG. NSW Rugby Union would also perform strongly throughout the following decades as well, which included the emergence of footballers such as Trevor Allan, David Brockhoff, Tony Miller, Nick Shehadie, Eddie Stapleton, Ken Catchpole, John Thornett, Peter Crittle and Ron Graham.

In 1963, the Sydney Rugby Union was established for the growth of the game in the city area. The NSW Rugby Union would celebrate its 100th anniversary in 1974. As part of the anniversary celebrations, a match was played at the SCG on 18 May against the All Blacks, though the Waratahs lost nil to 20.

=== Professional era ===
==== Super 12: 1996–2005 ====
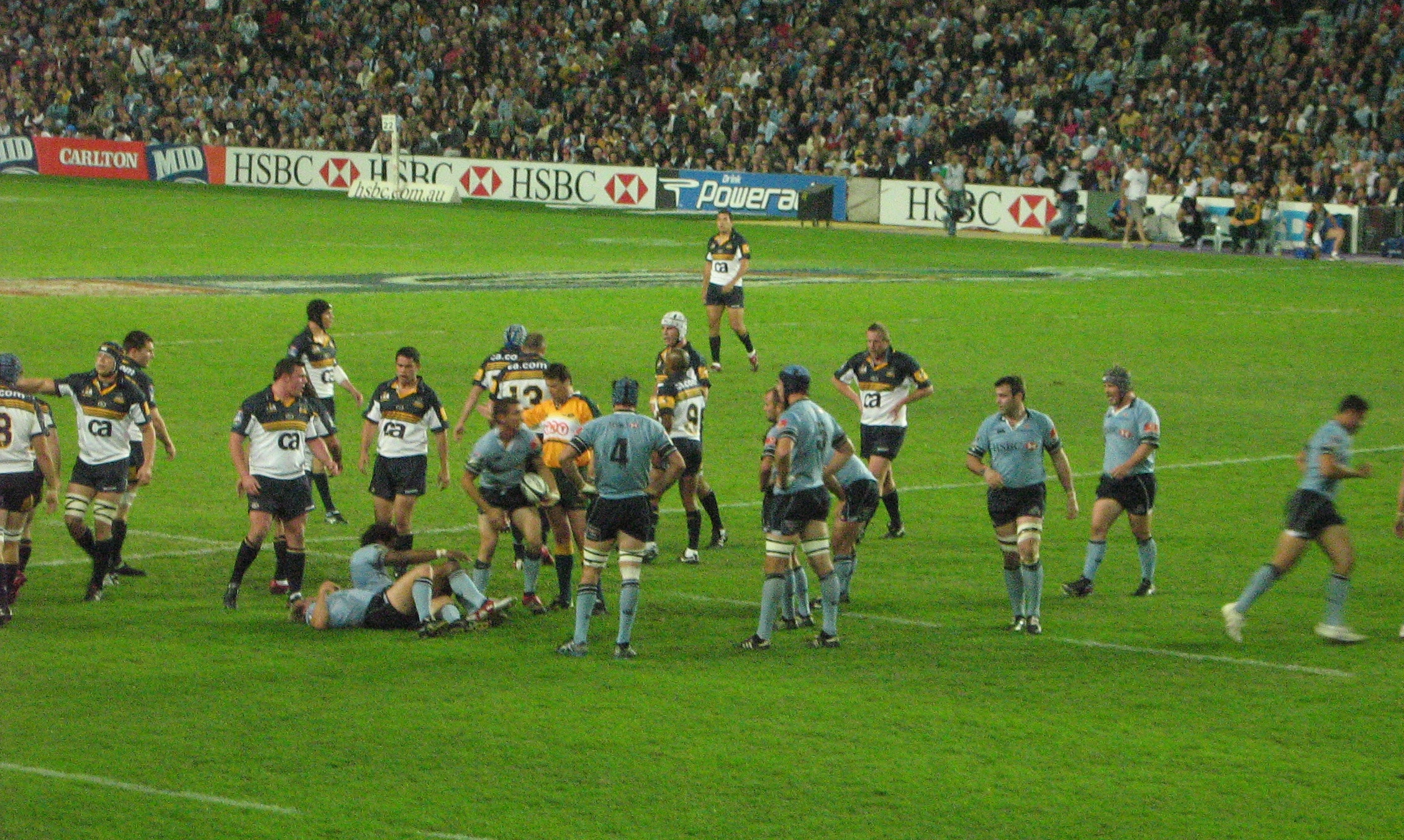
NSW Waratahs playing the ACT Brumbies in 2006

In their inaugural Super 12 season of 1996, the Waratahs won just under half of their games, finishing mid table, with the two other Australian teams finishing above them. The following season of 1997 saw the Waratahs end in a 9th place, winning four fixtures.

In the 1998 season the Waratahs won a best six out of 11 games, ending up in 6th position on the ladder at the end of the season, despite obvious improvements the team had still yet to make a finals appearance. The Waratahs won four fixtures the next season. They won five games in the 2000 season and the 'Tahs finished their season in 9th place.

In 2001 after replicating their 2000 performance, the Waratahs were still out of reach of finals contention, in 8th position. 2002 was a record breaking season for the Waratahs, as the team won eight out of their 11-season games and finished in second place behind the Crusaders – making the semis. However, in the final game of the regular season the Waratahs lost 96–19 (a Super Rugby record). They were defeated by their Australian rivals the Brumbies, 51–10, in the Waratahs' first ever semi-final. The combined score over the two weeks was Brumbies/Crusaders 147 v. Waratahs 29.

In the 2003 season the Waratahs missed a place in the finals, finishing in 6th position on the ladder at the end of the regular season. In 2004 the Waratahs made a promising start to their season with three straight wins. The team finished 8th on the Super 12 table, six points out of the finals. That year coach Ewen McKenzie re-introduced the end of season tour, taking place in Argentina that year. In 2005, they had their best regular season, finishing second in the table, before losing to the Crusaders in the 2005 Super 12 Final.

==== Super 14: 2006–2010 ====
The Waratahs finished 3rd on the regular season table for the 2006 Super 14 season, in which two new teams entered the expanding tournament, the Force and Cheetahs. In the last home match of the regular season, the Waratahs hosted the Hurricanes, which they lost 14 to 29. The news that star league recruit Wendell Sailor had tested positive to an illegal substance and thus faced a career ending ban from the game was an unwelcome intrusion on the Waratahs semifinal build up. The following week, the semi-finals, they again faced the Hurricanes, though away in Wellington. The Waratahs made their exit, losing 16 to 14. Wendell Sailor later received a two-year ban from the game, marring a season that had promised so much.

The 2007 Super 14 season was the most disappointing for the team and its supporters with the Waratahs winning only three games, against the Lions, the wooden spoon winning Reds, and the Hurricanes in the final round gaining a final placing of 13th out of 14. Despite the poor performance the 2007 season saw the emergence of teenage rugby prodigy Kurtley Beale and proved to be a vital rebuilding stage in the Waratahs super 14 championship run.

The 2008 season began well for the NSW Waratahs, with solid pre-season wins and a solid opening game victory against the Hurricanes 20–3. The 'Tahs secured their 500th win since their formation in their Fourth round match against the Brumbies. After starting the season in a slow but solid manner the 'Tahs began to play their best rugby in their mid season match with the Blues, scoring their first four try bonus point of the season. The Waratahs then continued on a roll finishing their home season with another impressive 4 try bonus point win against title front runners the Sharks, advancing to second place on the ladder. An average South African trip saw the team slip to third on the ladder after only notching up 3 competition points, due to a loss to the Bulls (7 or less BP) and a satisfactory draw against other title contenders the Stormers. The Waratahs faced the Reds in the final round with a win securing second place, combined with a home semi-final win over the Sharks, moved them up to their first Super 14 final against the Crusaders, which they later lost 12–20.

In the last two seasons of the Super 14 format, the Waratahs failed to make the final on both occasions after narrowly missing the finals (on points difference) in 2009 and qualifying for the semi-final in 2010. They finished 5th and 3rd in respective years, losing to the Stormers in the semi-final of the 2010 season.

==== Super Rugby: 2011–present ====
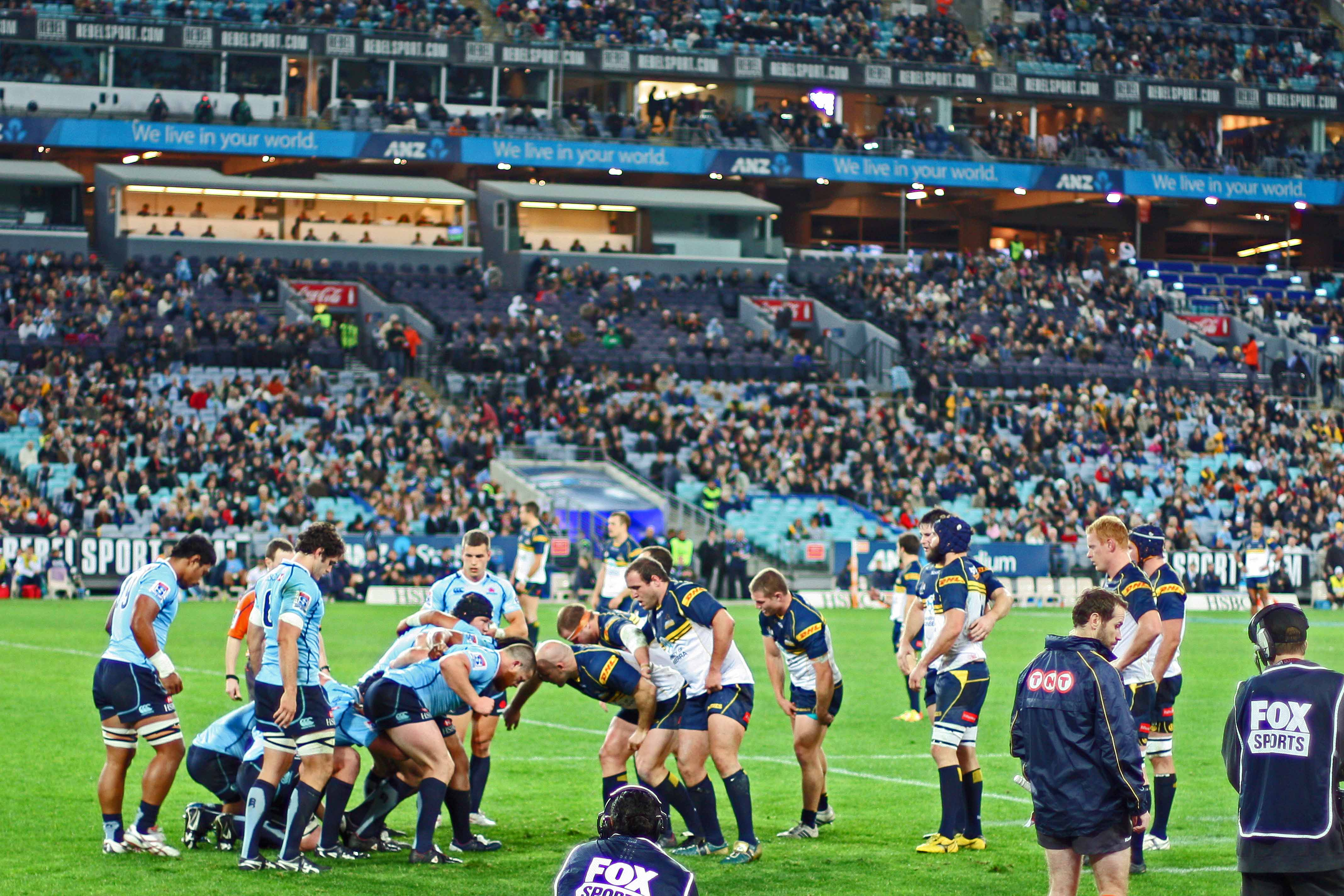
Waratahs and Brumbies during the 2012 Super Rugby season

In the 2011 season, the Waratahs again failed to reach the final. On this occasion, their season ended when they were eliminated by the Blues in the qualifying final after finishing 5th in the overall standings in the revamped competition. The following two seasons were very bleak by comparison. Coach Chris Hickey parted ways with the club at the end of the season with Michael Foley taking over the reins for 2012. The Waratahs finished well outside finals contention in 2012 in 11th place. This brought about another change in the coaching department with Michael Cheika for 2013. His impact was not immediate as the Waratahs failed to make the finals for a second consecutive season finishing 9th overall.

In 2013, the Waratahs qualified for the final series for the first time since 2008, securing fourth place overall and hosting a quarterfinal at the Sydney Football Stadium, where they fell to their Northern rivals, the Queensland Reds 12–14.

===== 2014 Premiership Season =====
The second season under coach Michael Cheika saw a new expansive style of rugby implemented which gave birth to exciting running rugby, bringing dwindling crowds back in force with home games averaging at around 19,152 people in attendance.

The running intent of Michael Cheika was quickly revealed after the team saw two fly halves announced in the starting game against Western Force. The Waratahs opening match not only saw Kurtley Beale's return, scoring one try and having a hand in several others, but it was also a showcase to reveal the Tahs new weapon; Israel Folau. Folau highlighted Cheika's intent scoring a hat-trick of tries in what was soon to be a season of all-out attack by the Waratahs. Not only did the Waratahs score the most points in the opening match out of any team with a 43–21 score, but they also had the second largest winning margin of 22 points.

The Waratahs went on to win the Australian conference with 13 more points than the team that came in at second place, the Brumbies, and came in as the number one team 7 points ahead of the competition. The Waratahs were in the driver's seat advancing straight through to the semi-finals; the club's 8th semi-final appearance. After the Brumbies defeated the Chiefs 32–30, the Brumbies advanced to compete against the Waratahs. The Waratahs displayed a show of force in their performance against an in-form Brumbies team, decimating them 26-8 granting the Waratahs a home final. The final, held at Stadium Australia, was host to 61,823 spectators. With two tries a piece, six penalties each, and the Crusaders up 32–30, only one conversion made the difference. The turning point in the game was a penalty at the 79th minute by the famous New Zealand flanker, Richie McCaw 45 metres out. Bernard Foley's penalty 45m out right in front of the post gave the Waratahs' a lead 33–32. The Waratahs had finally won a Super Rugby Championship.

===== 2016–2019 =====
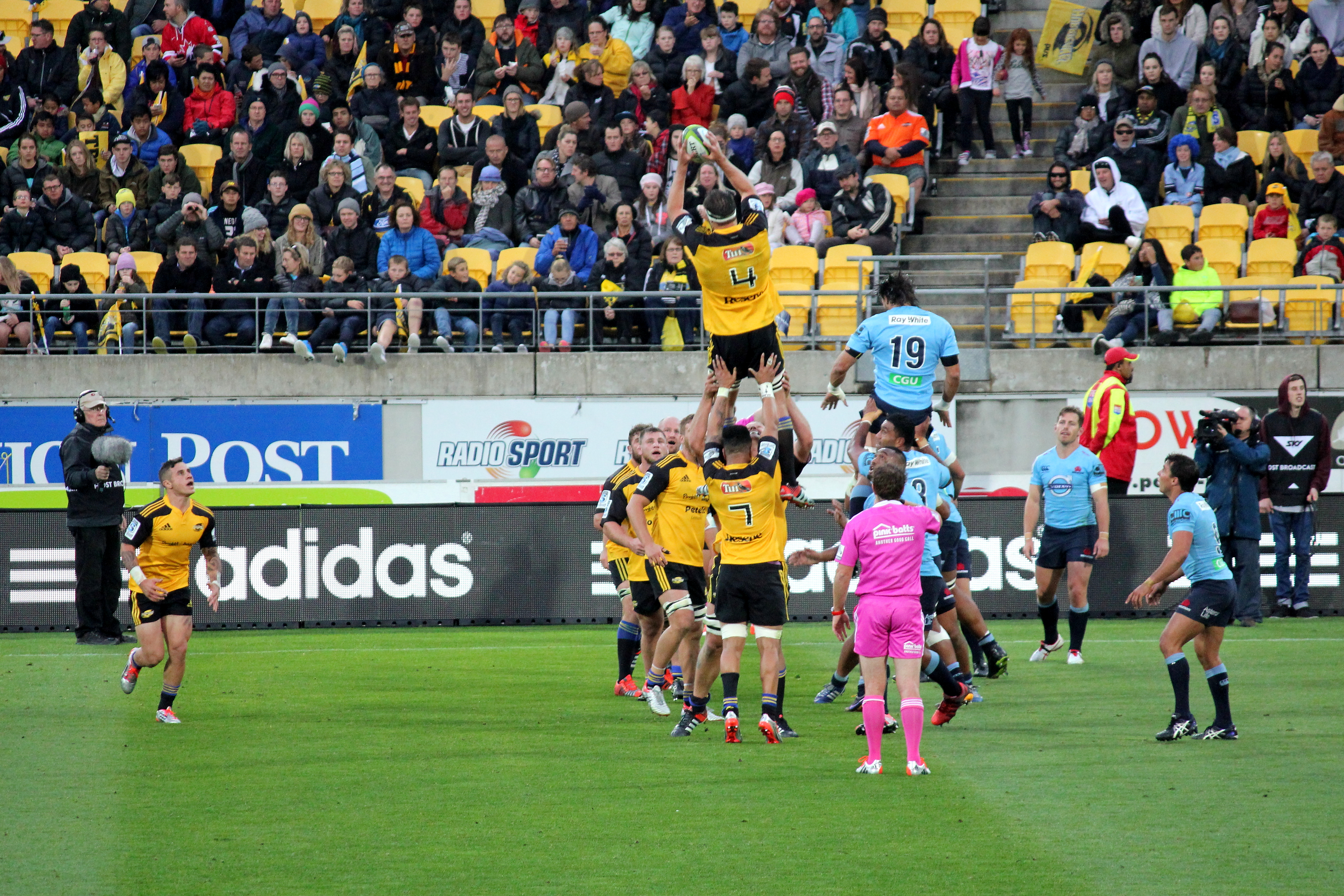
Lineout between the Hurricanes and Waratahs in 2015

The competition underwent significant format disruptions starting in 2016, when it expanded to 18 teams by adding Japan's Sunwolves and South Africa's Southern Kings, but this led to scheduling complexities that prompted SANZAAR to announce reductions back to 15 teams for 2018, axing the Kings, Cheetahs, and the Western Force. The 2017 season retained the 18-team structure with a conference system featuring four groups, two South African (Africa 1 and Africa 2), one Australian, and one New Zealand, where each team played 15 matches plus two byes, and finals included the four conference winners plus the next four highest-ranked teams regardless of conference.

===== Super Rugby AU, Trans-Tasman =====
The 2020 season was suspended after round seven due to the COVID-19 pandemic, with no finals series held and international travel bans preventing cross-border fixtures. In 2021, the tournament was restructured into domestic competitions: Super Rugby AU for Australian teams and Super Rugby Aotearoa for New Zealand, followed by a brief Trans-Tasman crossover series among the top teams from each. Throughout this period the Waratahs were struggling on the field; their 2021 season had been dubbed a "crisis" after five rounds without a win. By the time the season had concluded in June, having played eight domestic matches followed by five Trans-Tasman matchups, the Waratahs had finished with an 0–13 record, the equal worst losing streak in Australian rugby. The winless season was only the third in Super Rugby history and the first for an Australian team, following the Bulls in 2002, and the Lions in 2010.

===== Super Rugby Pacific =====
The Waratahs' historic losing-streak, which had extended to 538 days by the first round of the inaugural season of the Super Rugby Pacific, was ended following a 40–10 win against the Fijian Drua at Western Sydney Stadium in Parramatta. The win also doubled as the first Waratahs victory to begin a Super Rugby campaign since 2018, and marked the start under new coach Darren Coleman. The Waratahs embraced an expansive, high-tempo style which saw the team return to finals football against for the first time since 2018. They were ultimately eliminated in the quarter-finals by the Chiefs, but the season was widely viewed as evidence that the team had regained its competitive identity. Jed Holloway's performances earned him the Matt Burke Cup as the club's player of the year. After a further two seasons, and a 2–14 record in 2024 to finish last in the competition, Darren Coleman departed the club.

In 2025, the Waratahs had appointed Dan McKellar on a three-year deal. McKellar had previously been the coach of rival club, the Brumbies. In the off-season, the team had made a raft of new signings, including the acquisition of much lauded rugby league convert Joseph-Aukuso Sua'ali'i in a multimillion dollar deal from cross-town team the Sydney Roosters, as well as Test-capped forwards who joined the team following the exit of the Melbourne Rebels from the Super Rugby: Taniela Tupou, Isaac Aedo Kailea, and Rob Leota. Despite a poor 2024 season, the expectations on the Waratahs team going into 2025 were noted as considerably high, with a post-season tour match against the British & Irish Lions also lined up. The Waratahs kicked off the 2025 season with three consecutive victories, the first time they had done so since 2009. They sat second on the table after four rounds, as all four of Australia's Super Rugby teams made a positive start. The Waratahs form dipped as they then followed up with just two wins from four games leading into the bye round, although they claimed an upset victory over the Chiefs in Sydney to preserve their perfect home record for the season. By the end of the regular season, the injury-stricken Waratahs were comprehensively beaten by 40 points by the Blues in a decisive must-win encounter, ending their potential finals hopes. In their post-season match against the British & Irish Lions, the Waratahs produced a courageous, defence-first performance in a 21–10 loss, repeatedly shutting down attacks with aggressive line speed and composure to record Australia's strongest showing of the tour despite several TMO interventions that ruled out or reviewed multiple tries. After trailing 5–14 at half-time following two Huw Jones tries and a Darby Lancaster response, the Tahs narrowed the margin early in the second half through Ethan Dobbins before a costly error from fly-half Jack Bowen led to the Lions' decisive third try. While the inexperienced Waratahs attack struggled with poor passing, kicking and game management, their defence forced Lions mistakes and prevented the second-half scoring avalanche that was expected, with further Lions tries also disallowed. It was the most competitive match between the two teams since their 1989 encounter.

Similar to the previous season, the Waratahs kicked off 2026 positively with two home wins before a bye in round three. They did not win again until round seven against the Brumbies, ending an eight-year losing streak in Canberra. The Waratahs only managed five wins from 14 games, a decline from last year. In a post-season review, The Sydney Morning Herald showed that since their 2014 Premiership season, the Waratahs have missed the finals nine times, with a strike rate at 30%, compared to the ACT Brumbies whom had a strike rate of 77%. They added that while the Waratahs were the fourth-highest ranked team in the competition for 22-metre entries, they were the second-worst team in converting those entries into tries. In late June 2026, coach Dan McKellar, who had another year on his contract, resigned. It was reported by The Australian that it was not a guarantee he would stay, although McKellar stated that his departure was for personal reasons. Following his exit, the Waratahs were searching for a fourth head coach in six years.

In August 2026, the Waratahs announced the appointment of former head coach of the Waratahs Michael Cheika on a two-year deal beginning in 2027.

== Identity ==
=== Name and logo ===
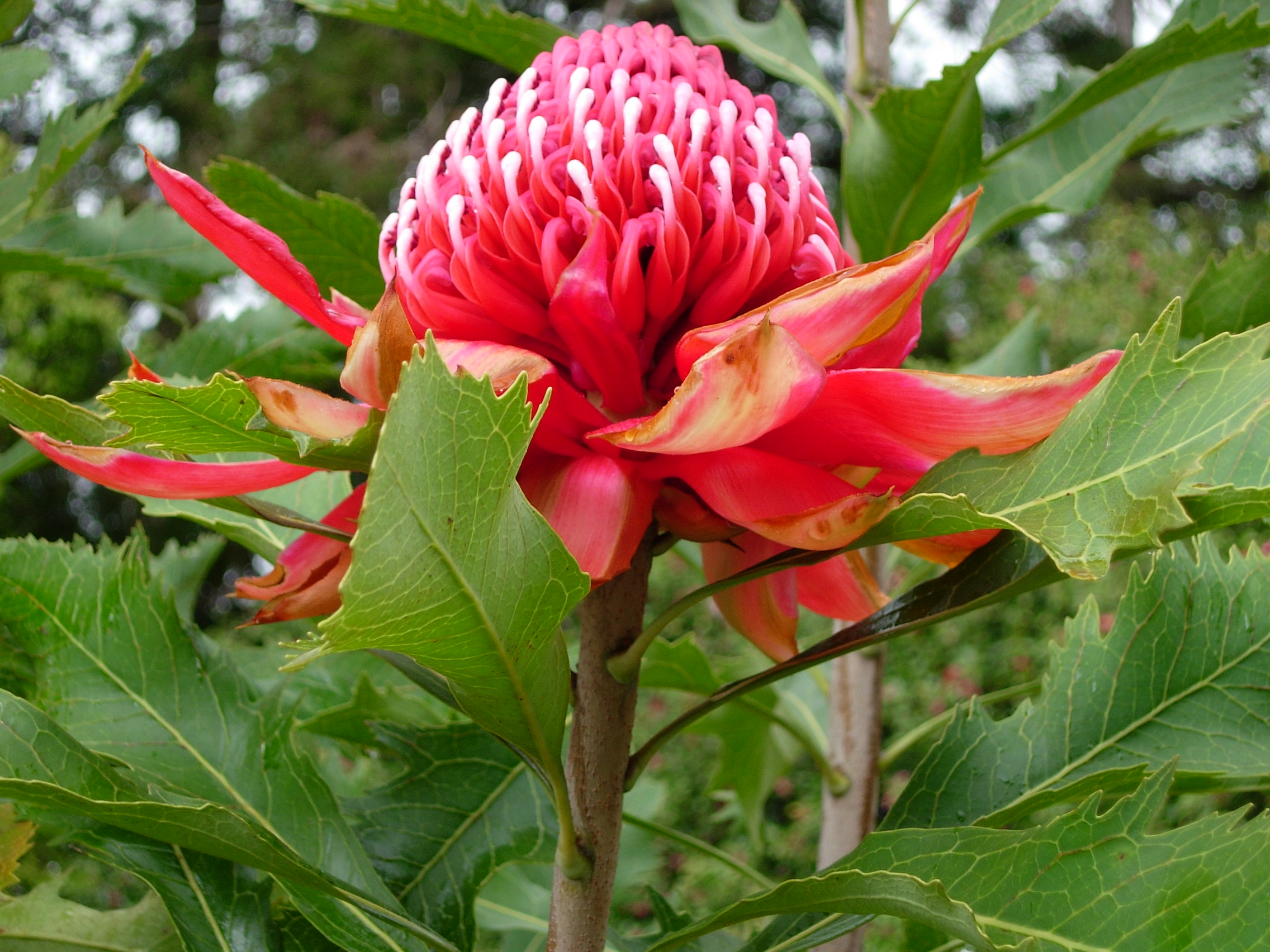
The waratah is the NSW state flower and emblem of the rugby team

The "Waratahs" name has since 1991 been the name for the New South Wales Rugby Union (NSWRU) representative team, and was continued when NSW entered the Super Six, Super 10 and Super 12 competitions.

The name and emblem comes from the waratah, the state flower for New South Wales. The badge was added in 1895 at the suggestion of Sydney's Moore Park based Wallaroo FC.

The NSW Waratahs commonly play in a Cambridge Blue jersey since 1891 and navy blue shorts, blue having a long sporting association with the state and a famous rivalry with the red/maroon colour of Queensland. Longtime sponsors HSBC featured on the front of the jersey until the final time when they played Argentina in August 2013.

The 2014 season saw Volvo as the Waratahs new major sponsor, after a number of years being minor sponsors with 'sleeve presence' on the previous jersey. An alternative white strip is also used. In pre-season of 2006, the Waratahs donned a New Jersey scheme in a trial game against the Crusaders. This system saw traditional rugby playing numbers on the back of jerseys replaced with the initials of the player. The current jersey is made by ISC and is Cambridge blue with navy side panels, collar and cuffs, with the alternate strip being white with five Cambridge blue hoops, collar and cuffs.

The NSW team have worn the Cambridge blue jersey since adopted by the NSWRU in 1891. The team's jerseys in its 1882 debut season were navy blue, then heather green 1883-85, and various shades of cardinal/maroon 1886-1890. The light blue jersey and navy blue pants were established in 1897 and have been in effect ever since.

=== Team song ===
At the end of every winning game, the Waratahs sing the following song:

"We are the mighty Waratahs
Rough and tumble rugby stars
We play the game as it should be played

Famous when we run the ball
We can scrum and ruck and maul
Playing the game as it should be played

Waratahs, Waratahs
We play the game as it should be played
Famous when we run the ball
We can scrum and ruck and maul
Playing the game as it should be played

We are the mighty men in blue
We will take the game to you
We play the game as it should be played

We've got talent
We've got heart
We will tear your team apart
Playing the game as it should be played

Waratahs, Waratahs
We play the game as it should be played
We've got talent
We've got heart
We will tear your team apart
Playing the game as it should be played"

—Waratahs website, Team song

== Sponsorship ==
In Super Rugby the Waratahs have featured the following sponsors:

Period	Apparel supplier	Period	Principal sponsor
1992–2006	Canterbury	1992–1996	Hahn
1992–2006	Canterbury	1996–1997	AAMI
1992–2006	Canterbury	1998–2000	Citibank
1992–2006	Canterbury		HSBC
2007–2009	ISC	2000–2013	HSBC
2010–2019			HSBC
2010–2019	Canterbury	2013–2015	Volvo
2010–2019		2016–2021	Daikin
2020	XBlades	2022	No sponsor
2021–present	ISC	2023-2024	NRI

== Region ==
=== Stadium ===
New South Wales Waratahs base(s) (Sydney)
New South Wales stadia location(s).

Until 2019, the Waratahs played at the old Sydney Football Stadium (SFS) in Sydney's Moore Park. The capacity for the stadium was 45,500. The Waratahs shared the ground with Sydney FC and the Sydney Roosters.

In 2009, the Waratahs signed a multimillion-dollar deal with Stadium Australia which saw them play at least one game per season at the Sydney Olympic Park stadium until 2015.

As well as the SFS, the Waratahs have on occasion played fixtures at other stadiums throughout the state. During the Australian Provincial Championship, in which the Waratahs had two fixtures, the games were taken to the Central Coast Stadium in Gosford, and the other to Bathurst. The Waratahs also played trial matches at Campbelltown Stadium in 2008 and 2015. During the 2018 Super Rugby season, the Waratahs played one home game at Brookvale Oval and one at the Sydney Cricket Ground.

With the SFS closed for demolition and rebuilding as the Sydney Football Stadium (2022) from 2019 to 2022 home games were split between the new Western Sydney Stadium, the Sydney Cricket Ground, Brookvale Oval and even outside of Sydney at Hunter Stadium in Newcastle.

In the inaugural edition of the Super Rugby AUS competition, the Waratahs played one home match at Narrabri's Dangar Park.

Moore Park (Sydney)	Parramatta (Sydney)	Moore Park (Sydney)	New Lambton (Newcastle)	Narrabri
Sydney Football Stadium	Western Sydney Stadium	Sydney Cricket Ground	Newcastle International Sports Centre	Dangar Park
Capacity: 42,500	Capacity: 30,000	Capacity: 48,000	Capacity: 33,000	Capacity: 5,000

== Players ==
=== Current squad ===
The squad for the 2027 Super Rugby Pacific season is:

2027 NSW Waratahs squad
**Props**: (Australia) Jack Barrett; (Australia) **Angus Bell**; (Australia) Daniel Botha; (Australia) George Francis; (Australia) **Isaac Aedo Kailea**; (New Zealand) Sefo Kautai; (Australia) Edwin Langi; (Fiji) Apolosi Ranawai *; **Hookers**: (Australia) Ethan Dobbins; (Australia) **Folau Fainga'a**; **Locks**: (Australia) **Miles Amatosero**; (Australia) Eamon Doyle; (Australia) **Matt Philip**; (Tonga) **Veikoso Poloniati**	**Loose forwards**: (Australia) Isaac Fonua; (Australia) Clem Halaholo; (Australia) Marshall Le Maitre; (Australia) **Luke Reimer**; (Australia) **Pete Samu**; (Australia) Angus Scott-Young; **Scrum-halves**: (Australia) **Jake Gordon**; (Australia) Angus Grover; (Australia) **Nick Phipps**; (Australia) Teddy Wilson; **Fly-halves**: (Australia) Max Burey; (Australia) **Bernard Foley**; (Australia) Joey Fowler	**Centres**: (Australia) Angus Crichton; (Australia) Henry O'Donnell; (Australia) George Poolman; (Australia) **Joseph-Aukuso Sua'ali'i**; **Outside backs**: (Australia) Sid Harvey; (Australia) Jimmy Hendren; (Australia) **Max Jorgensen**; (Australia) **Harry Potter**; (Australia) Otto Serfontein
**Bold** denotes internationally capped players. * denotes players qualified to play for Australia on residency or dual nationality. Source:

=== Super Rugby AUS ===
The squad for the 2026 Super Rugby AUS competition is:

2026 NSW Waratahs Super Rugby AUS squad
**Props**: (Australia) Brady Dawson; (Australia) Will Goddard; (Australia) **Isaac Aedo Kailea**; (Australia) Tom Lambert; (Australia) Edwin Langi; (Fiji) Apolosi Ranawai *; (Australia) Nate Tiitii; (Australia) Lotu Vunipola; **Hookers**: (Australia) Ethan Dobbins; (Australia) **Folau Fainga'a**; (Australia) Oniti Finau; (Australia) Tyler Maybery; **Locks**: (Australia) **Miles Amatosero**; (Australia) Eamon Doyle **(c)**; (Australia) Isaac Fonua; (Australia) Tom Girle; (Australia) Joe Mangelsdorf	**Loose forwards**: (Australia) Toby Brial; (Australia) Luca Cleverley; (Australia) Marshall Le Maitre; (Australia) **Luke Reimer**; (Australia) **Pete Samu**; (Australia) Angus Scott-Young; (Australia) Justice Taumoepeau; **Scrum-halves**: (Australia) Ben Fuhiniu (Note: Fuhiniu wasn't named in the original Super Rugby AUS squad, but was announced in the side for Round 3.); (Australia) Angus Grover; (Australia) **Nick Phipps**; (Australia) Teddy Wilson; **Fly-halves**: (Australia) Max Burey (Note: Burey wasn't named in the original Super Rugby AUS squad, but was announced in the side for Round 1.); (Australia) Joe Dillon (Note: Dillon wasn't named in the original Super Rugby AUS squad, but was announced in the side for Round 1.); (Australia) Joey Fowler	**Centres**: (Australia) Charlie Bird; (Australia) Nick Chan; (Australia) George Poolman; (Australia) Otto Serfontein; **Outside backs**: (Australia) Jack Hardy; (Australia) Sid Harvey; (Australia) Jimmy Hendren; (Samoa) **Latrell Smiler Ah-Kiong**; (Australia) Hadley Tonga; (New Zealand) Freedom Vaha'akolo
**(c)** denotes the team captain. **Bold** denotes internationally capped players. * denotes players qualified to play for Australia on residency or dual nationality. Source:

=== Development teams ===
The New South Wales Waratahs own and manages two National Rugby Championship teams, the Sydney Rays and NSW Country Eagles. These NRC teams draw on a range of players ranging from full-time professionals to those on incentive contracts. These teams are closely aligned with the Waratahs and are based at Moore Park, the training venue used by the Waratahs.

Outside of the NRC season, many of these players are retained in the Gen Blue (NSW A) team, which is the Waratahs elite development squad just below full-time professional level. The Sydney Rays and NSW Country Eagles also field Under 19 teams.

==== Gen Blue (NSW A) ====
The Gen Blue team plays matches against interstate and international representative teams, and has also competed in tournaments such as the Pacific Rugby Cup. Known by various names over the years including NSW A, Waratahs A, Gen Blue, and Junior Waratahs, the team is selected from the best emerging rugby talent in New South Wales. The squad is composed of Waratahs contracted players, extended training squad members, New South Wales Under 19s, and selected Shute Shield club players.

==== Under-19 ====
Two New South Wales teams, Sydney Rays U19 and NSW Country Eagles U19, play in the national URC competition. Prior to 2008, state colts teams at under 21 and under 19 age levels were fielded in national tournaments and competitions such as the Trans-Tasman Trophy. These colts teams were consolidated as under 20s ahead of the inaugural World Rugby U20 Championship. In 2018, an under 19 age limit was reinstated for the national colts team competition.

=== Awards ===
==== Player of the Season ====
The Matthew Burke Cup is awarded to the best Waratahs player at the end of each season:

- 2004 – Phil Waugh
- 2005 – Nathan Grey
- 2006 – Adam Freier
- 2007 – Rocky Elsom
- 2008 – Wycliff Palu
- 2009 – Wycliff Palu (2)
- 2010 – Tatafu Polota-Nau
- 2011 – Kurtley Beale
- 2012 – Dave Dennis
- 2013 – Michael Hooper
- 2014 – Michael Hooper (2)
- 2015 – Michael Hooper (3)
- 2016 – Michael Hooper (4)
- 2017 – Michael Hooper (5)
- 2018 – Israel Folau
- 2019 – Michael Hooper (6)
- 2020 – Michael Hooper (7)
- 2021 – Izaia Perese
- 2022 – Jed Holloway
- 2023 – Michael Hooper (8)
- 2024 – Lachlan Swinton
- 2025 – Langi Gleeson
- 2026 – Max Jorgensen

==== Rookie of the Season ====
The Chris Whitaker Medal, or Chris Whitaker Aspiring Waratah Medal, is presented to the team's most promising or stand-out young player and is named in honour of the former Waratahs and Wallabies halfback Chris Whitaker. It was inaugurated in 2006.

- 2006 – Lachlan Turner
- 2010 – Kane Douglas
- 2011 – Tom Kingston
- 2012 – Bernard Foley
- 2013 – Will Skelton
- 2014 – Alofa Alofa
- 2015 – Tolu Latu
- 2016 – Tom Robertson
- 2017 – Ned Hanigan
- 2018 – Harry Johnson-Holmes
- 2019 – Lachlan Swinton
- 2020 – James Ramm, Tom Horton (joint winners)
- 2021 – Max Douglas
- 2022 – Dylan Pietsch
- 2023 – Max Jorgensen
- 2024 – Miles Amatosero
- 2025 – Teddy Wilson
- 2026 – Sid Harvey

== Coaches ==
As of 30 June 2026.

All head coaches of the New South Wales Waratahs since the Super Rugby era (1980s), listed by order of the first game in charge of the team are:

Key
*	Caretaker/Interim coach

New South Wales Waratahs coaches (since 1985) (Note: Since the inception of the first Super Rugby comepetition(s), the South Pacific Championship.)
Coach	Tenure		P	W	D	L	W%	Refs
Coach	Start	End	P	W	D	L	W%	Refs
Amateur era
Brian O'Shea	29 January 1985	December 1986	10	6	0	4	60	
Paul Dalton	December 1986	October 1987	7	5	0	2	71	
Dick Laffan	1988	August 1990	24	13	0	11	54	
Rod Macqueen	20 August 1990	4 August 1992	19	14	1	4	74	
Greg Smith	1992	6 October 1995	39	25	1	13	64	
Professional era
Chris Hawkins	October 1995	26 August 1996	22	14	0	8	64	
Matt Williams	1997	1999	33	14	2	17	42	
Ian Kennedy	2000		11	5	0	6	45	
Bob Dwyer	2001	2003	34	19	15	0	56	
Ewen McKenzie	2004	2008	66	37	2	27	56	
Chris Hickey	2009	2011	44	28	0	16	64	
Michael Foley	2012		16	4	0	12	25	
Michael Cheika	18 September 2012	2 April 2015	51	33	0	18	65	
Daryl Gibson	27 June 2015 (Note: Although Daryl Gibson was confirmed as the new coach of the Waratahs on 2 April 2015, he would not take over the position from Michael Cheika until the season had concluded.)	21 June 2019	64	28	1	35	44	
Rob Penney	2 October 2019	28 March 2021	19	5	0	14	26	
Jason Gilmore	28 March 2021	1 July 2021	8	0	0	8	—N/a	
Chris Whitaker	28 March 2021	1 July 2021	8	0	0	8	—N/a	
Darren Coleman	1 July 2021	31 May 2024	44	16	0	28	36	
Dan McKellar	5 July 2024	29 June 2026	29	11	0	18	38	
Michael Cheika	November 2026							

== Honours ==
=== Professional era ===
- Super 12/14 (1996–2010):
  - Runners-up (2): 2005, 2008
  - Play-off Appearances (3): 2002, 2006, 2010
- Super Rugby (2011–present): / Super Rugby AU (2020–2021): / Super Rugby Trans-Tasman (2021):
  - Champions: 2014
  - Australian Conference Champions (3): 2014, 2015, 2018
  - Play-off Appearances (6): 2011, 2014, 2015, 2018, 2022, 2023
- Super Rugby AUS (2025–present):
  - Champions: 2025

== Statistics ==
=== Records ===
As of 26 November 2014.

Statistics in this section include only those pertaining to Super Rugby matches (1996–present). They do not include any matches prior to this period (1882–1995). Records for "in a season" include finals games unless otherwise stated.

==== Team records ====
- Biggest winning margin: 62 vs. Southern Kings, Nelson Mandela Bay Stadium (2013)
- Biggest win: 72–10 vs. Southern Kings, Nelson Mandela Bay Stadium (2013)
- Biggest loss: 19–96 vs. Crusaders, Lancaster Park (2002)
- Highest team score: 77 vs. Sunwolves, Sydney Football Stadium (2018)
- Most regular season wins: 12 (2014)
- Most consecutive wins in a season: 9 (2014)
- Most consecutive defeats in a season: 13 (2021)
- Most tries in a season: 81 (2018)
- Most conversions in a season: 68, Bernard Foley (2018)
- Most penalty goals in a season: 50 (2014)
- Most drop-goals in a season: 3 (2014)
- Most points in a season: 613 (2018)
- Most tries scored in a match: 12 vs. Sunwolves, Sydney Football Stadium (2018)
- Most conversions in a match: 9 vs. Lions, Sydney Football Stadium (2010)
- Most penalty goals in a match: 7 vs. Blues, Sydney Football Stadium (2001); vs. Crusaders, Stadium Australia (2014)
- Most drop-goals in a match: 1 on 12 occasions

==== Individual records ====
- Most caps: 151, Benn Robinson
- Most caps as captain: 65, Michael Hooper (Note: The Sydney Morning Herald claims 64, while the New South Wales Rugby Union states 65.)
- Most wins as captain: N/A
- Most points: 1,172, Matt Burke (1996–2004)
- Most tries: 60, Israel Folau (2013–2019)
- Most conversions: 244, Bernard Foley
- Most penalty goals: 173, Matt Burke (1996–2004)
- Most drop-goals: 3, Kurtley Beale (2007–2020) and Berrick Barnes (2010–2013)
- Most points in a season: 252, Bernard Foley (2014)
- Most tries in a season: 15, Taqele Naiyaravoro (2018)
- Most conversions in a season: 68, Bernard Foley (2018)
- Most penalty goals in a season: 44, Bernard Foley (2014)
- Most drop-goals in a season: 3, Berrick Barnes (2010)
- Most points in a match: 34 (3t; 2c, 5p), Peter Hewat vs. Bulls, Sydney Football Stadium (2005)
- Most tries in match: 4, Drew Mitchell vs. Lions, Sydney Football Stadium (2010)
- Most conversions in match: 9, Berrick Barnes vs. Lions, Sydney Football Stadium (2010)
- Most penalty goals in a match: 7, Matt Burke vs. Blues, Sydney Football Stadium (2001); Bernard Foley vs. Crusaders, Stadium Australia (2014)
- Most drop-goals in a match: 1, (on 12 occasions – Kurtley Beale & Berrick Barnes on 3 occasions – and 6 others players on 1 occasion each)

== See also ==
- Dan Vickerman Cup
- National Rugby Championship

== Bibliography ==
- Howitt, Bob (2005). SANZAR Saga: Ten Years of Super 12 and Tri-Nations Rugby. Auckland: HarperCollins. ISBN 1-86950-566-2.

Preceded by Chiefs (2013)	Super Rugby Champions; 2014	Succeeded by Highlanders (2015)
