= George Poolman =

Australian rugby union player

- Born: 6 September 2002 (age 24) Australia
- Height: 195 cm (6 ft 5 in)
- Weight: 102 kg (225 lb; 16 st 1 lb)

Rugby union career
- Position(s): Centre, wing
- Current team: Force
Senior career
Years	Team	Apps	(Points)
2023–2025	Western Force	31	(15)
- Correct as of 21 May 2025

George Poolman (born 6 September 2002) is an Australian rugby union player, who plays for the Force. His preferred position is centre.

== Early career ==
Poolman is from New South Wales, and lived in Germany as a child. He represents Sydney University in the Shute Shield and joined the Western Force academy as a 19-year-old. His brother Eddie is also a professional rugby player who represented London Irish in 2023.

== Professional career ==
Poolman was promoted to the Force senior squad ahead of the 2023 Super Rugby Pacific season. He made his debut as a late replacement in Round 1 of the 2023 season, coming on as a replacement against the Rebels. In June 2023, he re-signed for the side until 2025.
