= Tom Lambert (rugby union) =

Scottish rugby union player

- Born: Thomas Lambert; 20 November 2000 (age 25) Sydney, New South Wales, Australia
- Height: 1.88 m (6 ft 2 in)
- Weight: 117 kg (258 lb; 18 st 6 lb)

Rugby union career
- Position: Loosehead Prop
Senior career
Years	Team	Apps	(Points)
2020–22	Glasgow Warriors	5	(0)
2023-2026	New South Wales Waratahs	30	(5)
International career
Years	Team	Apps	(Points)
2020–22	Scotland U20	5	(0)
2023	Australia 'A'	1	(0)

Tom Lambert (born 20 November 2000) is an Australian rugby union player, now playing with New South Wales Waratahs. He previously played for Glasgow Warriors in the Pro14. Lambert's primary position is loosehead prop.

== Rugby union career ==
=== Professional career ===
Lambert was named as a member of the Glasgow Warriors academy for the 2020–21 season. He made his debut for Glasgow Warriors in Round 1 of the Pro14 Rainbow Cup against Benetton. He became Glasgow Warrior No. 327.

It was announced on 17 August 2022 that Lambert would return to his city of birth for the 2023 season, having signed with the New South Wales Waratahs.

=== International career ===
Born in Sydney and schooled at Trinity Grammar School, Lambert represented Australian Schools and was part of the Waratahs Academy before heading overseas to Scotland in 2020.

Lambert represented Scotland’s under-20s side during the 2020 Six Nations, and signed with Glasgow Warriors on an academy contract before graduating to the main team in 2021.

He was capped by Australia 'A' in 2023.
