= The Roar (website) =

Australian sports opinion website

- Website type: Sports news; Opinion
- Available in: English
- Founded: 2006; 20 years ago
- Headquarters: Sydney, New South Wales, Australia
- Key people: Tony Harper, Tim Miller, Paul Suttor (editors), Christy Doran (rugby editor), Mike Meehall-Wood (NRL writer)
- Website: www.theroar.com.au
- Current status: Active
- ISSN: 2201-5639

The Roar is an Australian sports news and opinion website. It was established by brothers Zac and Zolton Zavos in late 2006. Initially, The Roar was a blog to host writing from their father, Spiro Zavos, who was a rugby columnist with Fairfax Media at the time. It quickly developed into a site which combines expert sports opinion articles with edited fan articles.

== History ==
In 2007, Zac Zavos formed the company Conversant Media Pty Ltd, which published The Roar as well as the culture site, Lost At E Minor - a site the brothers had been publishing since 2005. In December 2010, Network Ten became a minority investor.

The business was run from Newcastle, Australia during its formative years of 2008 to 2015, and was an early recipient of the Renew Newcastle office space program.

In June 2016, The Roar had 156 expert commentators. Each month it publishes about 1,000 articles from experts and fans. The main sports covered by The Roar are rugby union, rugby league, AFL, cricket, and soccer. In 2016, Conversant Media was acquired in full by HT&E for $11.6m, being placed under the aegis of the Australian Radio Network. The Roar continued to grow under the new corporate ownership, with Zac Zavos becoming the CEO of Conversant Media.

During December 2019, The Roar was sold by the Australian Radio Network to a startup called Athletes Voice. Athletes Voice expressed a desire to “modernise” the website.

Athletes Voice and The Roar were acquired by PlayUp Ltd in February 2021. PlayUp is a technology provider for online betting services.

In February 2026 The Sydney Morning Herald reported that The Roar, which had not been active for a month, had not paid its staff for eight weeks, and owed over A$100k in unpaid wages and superannuation. The website had reportedly been in a year-long ownership dispute between a company known as Fan Media and a former cosmetic surgery entrepreneur Daniel Corsello, which prevented a potential rescue takeover from the owner of American-based sports news outlet The Sporting News.
