= Ethan Dobbins =

Australian rugby union player

- Born: 3 May 2000 (age 26) Australia
- Height: 181 cm (5 ft 11 in)
- Weight: 108 kg (238 lb)
- School: Gregory terrace

Rugby union career
- Position: Hooker
- Current team: Waratahs
Senior career
Years	Team	Apps	(Points)
2024	Rebels	5	(0)
2025–	Waratahs	14	(0)
- Correct as of 19 June 2026

Ethan Dobbins (born 3 May 2000) is an Australian rugby union player, who plays for the Waratahs. His position is hooker.

== Early career ==
Dobbins is from Queensland and attended St Joseph's College, Gregory Terrace. He plays his club rugby for Wests.

== Professional career ==
Dobbins was named in the Rebels squad ahead of the 2024 Super Rugby Pacific season. He made his debut in Round 4 of the season against the Reds.

He has signed for the Waratahs for the 2025 season. In September 2026, Dobbins scored two tries in a 17–12 loss against the Western Force in the 2026 Super Rugby AUS competition.
