= Dan McKellar =

Australian rugby union player

- Born: 17 July 1976 (age 50) Brisbane, Queensland, Australia
- Height: 190 cm (6 ft 3 in)
- Weight: 112 kg (247 lb)
- School: Townsville Grammar School
- Height and weight correct as of 2006

Rugby union career
- Position: Prop
Amateur team(s)
Years	Team	Apps	(Points)
–1995	Burdekin Canetoads		
1996–2006	Souths		
Senior career
Years	Team	Apps	(Points)
2001–2005	Wicklow		
Super Rugby
Years	Team	Apps	(Points)
2006	Queensland Reds	0	(0)
Coaching career
- Years: Team
- 2008–2010: Souths
- 2011–2012: Tuggeranong Vikings
- 2013: NTT DoCoMo Red Hurricanes (Forwards coach)
- 2014–2018: Brumbies (Assistant coach)
- 2014: Canberra Vikings
- 2018–2022: Brumbies
- 2021–2023: Australia (Assistant coach)
- 2023–2024: Leicester Tigers
- 2024–2026: Waratahs
- 2026–: Black Rams Tokyo (Assistant coach)
- Correct as of 25 August 2026

Dan McKellar (born 17 July 1976) is an Australian professional rugby union coach. He most recently was the head coach of the New South Wales Waratahs in the Super Rugby Pacific competition. He was previously the head coach for Leicester Tigers in England's Premiership Rugby, the head coach of Super Rugby team the Brumbies, head coach of the University of Canberra Vikings in Australia's National Rugby Championship, and an assistant coach for the Australian national rugby union team.

== Early life ==
McKellar grew up in Burdekin in North Queensland. He was introduced to rugby at Townsville Grammar School. He played first grade club rugby as a teenager, helping the Burdekin Canetoads win the Townsville premiership in 1994.

== Rugby career ==
As a loosehead prop, McKellar played more than 150 premier grade games over a decade at Souths Rugby Club in Brisbane, winning a premiership in 2000. He was a member of the Queensland Reds Super Rugby squad in 2005 and 2006. He also had stints playing overseas in Scotland and Ireland. McKellar began learning the art of coaching at Wicklow, a small rugby club just outside Dublin in Ireland. He was playing on the team and acting as his side's assistant coach in 2001, and took over the main player-coach role from 2002 to 2005.

== Coaching career ==
McKellar was a premier grade assistant coach at Souths Rugby Club in Brisbane in 2007, and the head coach from 2008 to 2010. He was appointed as coaching director and head coach of the Tuggeranong Vikings Rugby Club in Canberra for seasons 2011 and 2012 which included back-to-back premierships in premier grade. He also set up the professional rugby academy at the Vikings Club. In February 2013, McKellar moved to Japan to take up a position as forwards coach of Top League team NTT DoCoMo Red Hurricanes.

Returning to Canberra, he signed with the Brumbies as the club's defence and skills coach for the 2014 Super Rugby season. After the launch of the National Rugby Championship, he was appointed as head coach of the University of Canberra Vikings team to play in the new competition.

McKellar was appointed as head coach of the Brumbies for the 2018 season following Stephen Larkham's departure.

In August 2021 it was announced McKellar would wind up a successful five-year stint as Brumbies head coach at the end of the 2022 Super Rugby season and would remain in his position with the Australia national team. During his time as Brumbies head coach he led the side to the Super Rugby Semi-Final in 2019 and back-to-back Super Rugby AU Grand-Finals in 2020–21, famously taking out the 2020 title in front of a home crowd at GIO Stadium.

After holding his role within the Australia national team since 2021, McKellar resigned from his job to join English Premiership team the Leicester Tigers, effective from 1 July 2023. After a single season in charge at Leicester, McKellar was dismissed following an underwhelming season and reports of a lack of "buy in" from players to his methods.

On 29 June 2026, McKellar resigned as head coach of the Waratahs, effective immediately. McKellar still had a year remaining on his contract when he resigned.

In August 2026, the Black Rams Tokyo in the Japan Rugby League One announced the appointment of McKellar as an assistant coach ahead of the 2026–27 season.

== Honours ==
=== Player ===
Souths

- Queensland Premier Rugby: 1998, 2000

=== Coach ===
Tuggeranong Vikings

- John I Dent Cup: 2011, 2012

Brumbies

- Super Rugby AU: 2020
