= 2026 Bledisloe Cup =

- Event: Bledisloe Cup series
New Zealand	Australia
2	0

First test
New Zealand	Australia
50	19
- Match details
- Date: 10 October
- Venue: Eden Park, Auckland

Second test
Australia	New Zealand
21	43
- Match details
- Date: 17 October
- Venue: Stadium Australia, Sydney

The 2026 Bledisloe Cup was a two-Test rugby union series held between Australia and New Zealand in October 2026. Usually contested in the Rugby Championship (since 1996), the rugby union trophy was held as a standalone series due to the restructuring of the Rugby Championship from its usual annual format following the New Zealand tour of South Africa, which excluded 2026 and 2030 editions.

New Zealand retained the Bledisloe Cup following their 50–19 victory in the First Test, and eventually won the series 2–0 after winning the Second Test 21–43, extending their record win-streak against Australia to thirteen.

== Background ==
Beginning in 2022, the Bledisloe Cup was reduced to two tests from three, a mutual decision by Rugby Australia (RA) and New Zealand Rugby (NZR). These test matches, with the exception of Rugby World Cup (RWC) years, would make up two of the fixtures in the Rugby Championship. In 2025 it was announced that the Rugby Championship format would be restructured from its annual format in 2026 and 2030 with New Zealand and South Africa confirming reciprocal tours for those years. Rugby Australia confirmed the Wallabies' 2026 schedule, which would still include their traditional Rugby Championship opponents and a tour of Argentina. The prospect of cross-SANZAAR tours as a replacement for the Rugby Championship between 2027 and 2028, as reported by The Sydney Morning Herald, was scrapped after lobbying efforts from RA CEO Phil Waugh at a SANZAAR meeting in London. This meant the Rugby Championship would remain unchanged for 2027, 2028, and 2029.

== Venues ==
Australia's home test for the Bledisloe Cup series was revealed in November 2025 following Rugby Australia's release of the Wallabies' 2026 schedule. At the time of the announcement, their home venue, Stadium Australia, had only played host to three test since 2020: two against New Zealand, one against the British & Irish Lions in 2025. New Zealand announced their test schedule the following month, revealing Eden Park as the venue to host the opening match of the 2026 Bledisloe Cup.

Auckland	Series venues: New Zealand; 1 Eden Park, Auckland; Australia; 2 Stadium Australia, Australia
Eden Park	Series venues: New Zealand; 1 Eden Park, Auckland; Australia; 2 Stadium Australia, Australia
Capacity: 50,000	Series venues: New Zealand; 1 Eden Park, Auckland; Australia; 2 Stadium Australia, Australia
Sydney	Series venues: New Zealand; 1 Eden Park, Auckland; Australia; 2 Stadium Australia, Australia
Stadium Australia	Series venues: New Zealand; 1 Eden Park, Auckland; Australia; 2 Stadium Australia, Australia
Capacity: 83,000	Series venues: New Zealand; 1 Eden Park, Auckland; Australia; 2 Stadium Australia, Australia

== Squads ==
Caps and ages are as of the first match of the series (10 October 2026).

=== Australia ===
On 30 September 2026, Australia named a 34-man squad ahead of the Bledisloe Cup series.

On 1 October 2026, Hunter Paisami, who was initially named in the 34-man squad, was replaced by Jock Campbell after being suspended for four games following a citation for a dangerous tackle in Australia's previous match.

Head Coach: Les Kiss

Player	Position	Date of birth (age)	Caps	Club/province
Josh Nasser	Hooker	23 June 1999 (aged 27)	16	(Australia) Reds
Brandon Paenga-Amosa	Hooker	25 December 1995 (aged 30)	31	(Australia) Force
Billy Pollard	Hooker	9 December 2001 (aged 24)	25	(Australia) Brumbies
Allan Alaalatoa	Prop	28 January 1994 (aged 32)	94	(Australia) Brumbies
Angus Bell	Prop	4 October 2000 (aged 26)	58	(Australia) Waratahs
Massimo de Lutiis	Prop	18 November 2003 (aged 22)	3	(Australia) Reds
Isaac Aedo Kailea	Prop	13 July 2000 (aged 26)	9	(Australia) Waratahs
Zane Nonggorr	Prop	30 March 2001 (aged 25)	20	(Australia) Reds
Aidan Ross	Prop	25 October 1995 (aged 30)	7	(Australia) Reds
Josh Canham	Lock	1 February 2001 (aged 25)	8	(Australia) Reds
Lukhan Salakaia-Loto	Lock	19 September 1996 (aged 30)	48	(Australia) Reds
Lachlan Shaw	Lock	15 May 2003 (aged 23)	5	(Australia) Brumbies
Jeremy Williams	Lock	2 December 2000 (aged 25)	33	(Australia) Force
Nick Champion de Crespigny	Back row	27 June 1996 (aged 30)	5	(Australia) Force
Toby MacPherson	Back row	18 August 2004 (aged 22)	0	(Australia) Brumbies
Fraser McReight	Back row	19 February 1999 (aged 27)	47	(Australia) Reds
Carlo Tizzano	Back row	2 February 2000 (aged 26)	17	(Australia) Force
Rob Valetini	Back row	3 September 1998 (aged 28)	69	(Australia) Brumbies
Harry Wilson (c)	Back row	22 November 1999 (aged 26)	43	(Australia) Reds
Ryan Lonergan	Scrum-half	6 April 1998 (aged 28)	13	(Australia) Brumbies
Tate McDermott	Scrum-half	18 September 1998 (aged 28)	56	(Australia) Reds
Kalani Thomas	Scrum-half	18 April 2002 (aged 24)	2	(Australia) Reds
Ben Donaldson	Fly-half	4 April 1999 (aged 27)	26	(Australia) Force
Harry McLaughlin-Phillips	Fly-half	13 April 2004 (aged 22)	0	(Australia) Force
Declan Meredith	Fly-half	28 June 1999 (aged 27)	3	(Australia) Brumbies
Isaac Henry	Centre	8 March 1999 (aged 27)	4	(Australia) Reds
Len Ikitau	Centre	1 October 1998 (aged 28)	55	(Australia) Brumbies
Joseph-Aukuso Sua'ali'i	Centre	1 August 2003 (aged 23)	25	(Australia) Waratahs
Filipo Daugunu	Wing	4 March 1995 (aged 31)	24	(Australia) Reds
Max Jorgensen	Wing	2 September 2004 (aged 22)	28	(Australia) Waratahs
Jordan Petaia	Wing	14 March 2000 (aged 26)	31	(Japan) Urayasu D-Rocks
Harry Potter	Wing	15 December 1997 (aged 28)	16	(Australia) Waratahs
Jock Campbell	Fullback	17 May 1995 (aged 31)	6	(Australia) Reds
Tom Wright	Fullback	21 July 1997 (aged 29)	51	(Australia) Brumbies

=== New Zealand ===
On 29 September 2026, New Zealand announced a 34-man squad ahead of the two Tests against Australia.

Richie Mo'unga was originally part of the squad but was ruled out before the first test with a calf injury. He was replaced by Emoni Narawa. Fehi Fineanganofo was also originally part of the squad but was ruled out before the first test after he suffered a concussion playing in the National Provincial Championship. He was replaced by Chay Fihaki.

Head Coach: Dave Rennie

Player	Position	Date of birth (age)	Caps	Club/province
Asafo Aumua	Hooker	5 May 1997 (aged 29)	26	(New Zealand) Hurricanes / Wellington
Codie Taylor	Hooker	31 March 1991 (aged 35)	112	(New Zealand) Crusaders / Canterbury
Samisoni Taukei'aho	Hooker	8 August 1997 (aged 29)	29	(New Zealand) Chiefs / Waikato
George Bower	Prop	28 May 1992 (aged 34)	29	(New Zealand) Crusaders / Otago
Ethan de Groot	Prop	22 July 1998 (aged 28)	45	(New Zealand) Highlanders / Southland
Tyrel Lomax	Prop	16 March 1996 (aged 30)	55	(New Zealand) Hurricanes / Tasman
Fletcher Newell	Prop	1 March 2000 (aged 26)	41	(New Zealand) Crusaders / Canterbury
Xavier Numia	Prop	29 November 1998 (aged 27)	5	(New Zealand) Hurricanes / Wellington
Pasilio Tosi	Prop	18 July 1998 (aged 28)	17	(New Zealand) Hurricanes / Bay of Plenty
Scott Barrett	Lock	20 November 1993 (aged 32)	89	(New Zealand) Crusaders / Taranaki
Fabian Holland	Lock	9 October 2002 (aged 24)	15	(New Zealand) Highlanders / Otago
Josh Lord	Lock	17 January 2001 (aged 25)	17	(New Zealand) Chiefs / Taranaki
Tupou Vaa'i	Lock	27 January 2000 (aged 26)	51	(New Zealand) Chiefs / Taranaki
Ethan Blackadder	Loose forward	22 March 1995 (aged 31)	15	(New Zealand) Crusaders / Tasman
Shannon Frizell	Loose forward	11 February 1994 (aged 32)	33	(New Zealand) Highlanders / Tasman
Peter Lakai	Loose forward	4 March 2003 (aged 23)	14	(New Zealand) Hurricanes / Wellington
Simon Parker	Loose forward	6 May 2000 (aged 26)	10	(New Zealand) Chiefs / Northland
Anton Segner	Loose forward	24 July 2001 (aged 25)	2	(New Zealand) Blues / Auckland
Wallace Sititi	Loose forward	7 September 2002 (aged 24)	23	(New Zealand) Chiefs / North Harbour
Kyle Preston	Half-back	13 September 1999 (aged 27)	5	(New Zealand) Crusaders / Wellington
Cortez Ratima	Half-back	22 March 2001 (aged 25)	24	(New Zealand) Chiefs / Waikato
Cam Roigard	Half-back	16 November 2000 (aged 25)	24	(New Zealand) Hurricanes / Counties Manukau
Josh Jacomb	First five-eighth	23 June 2001 (aged 25)	0	(New Zealand) Chiefs / Taranaki
Jordie Barrett	Centre	17 February 1997 (aged 29)	85	(New Zealand) Hurricanes / Taranaki
Rieko Ioane	Centre	18 March 1997 (aged 29)	89	(New Zealand) Blues / Auckland
Timoci Tavatavanawai	Centre	14 February 1998 (aged 28)	2	(New Zealand) Highlanders / Tasman
Quinn Tupaea	Centre	10 May 1999 (aged 27)	29	(New Zealand) Chiefs / Waikato
Leroy Carter	Wing	24 February 1999 (aged 27)	10	(New Zealand) Chiefs / Bay of Plenty
Chay Fihaki	Wing	3 January 2001 (aged 25)	0	(New Zealand) Crusaders / Canterbury
Emoni Narawa	Wing	13 July 1999 (aged 27)	4	(New Zealand) Chiefs / Bay of Plenty
Beauden Barrett	Fullback	27 May 1991 (aged 35)	145	(New Zealand) Blues / Taranaki
Will Jordan	Fullback	24 February 1998 (aged 28)	61	(New Zealand) Crusaders / Tasman
Damian McKenzie	Fullback	20 April 1995 (aged 31)	81	(New Zealand) Chiefs / Waikato
Josh Moorby	Fullback	11 July 1998 (aged 28)	5	(New Zealand) Hurricanes / Waikato

== Test series ==
=== First test ===
10 October 2026
19:10 NZDT (UTC+13)

New Zealand	50–19	Australia
Try: Lakai 12' c Vaa'i 16' c Roigard 49' c Taylor 55' c Carter 66' c Moorby 73' m Jordan 80' c Con: McKenzie (6/7) 13', 17', 50', 55', 67', 80+1'; Pen: McKenzie (1/1) 33'	Report	Try: Wright 8' c Wilson 37' c Nasser 76' c Con: Lonergan (2/2) 9', 38'

Eden Park, Auckland
Attendance: 46,352
Referee: Andrew Brace (Ireland)

FB	15	Beauden Barrett
RW	14	Will Jordan
OC	13	Quinn Tupaea
IC	12	Jordie Barrett	(substituted off) 70'
LW	11	Leroy Carter	(substituted off) 68'
FH	10	Damian McKenzie
SH	9	Cam Roigard	(substituted off) 70'
N8	8	Wallace Sititi	(substituted off) 53'	(substituted on) 79'
OF	7	Peter Lakai
BF	6	Tupou Vaa'i
RL	5	Josh Lord	(substituted off) 59'	(substituted on) 72'
LL	4	Scott Barrett		(substituted off) 72'
TP	3	Fletcher Newell	(substituted off) 59'
HK	2	Codie Taylor (c)	(substituted off) 56'	(substituted on) 79'
LP	1	Ethan de Groot	(substituted off) 49'
Substitutions:
HK	16	Asafo Aumua	(substituted on) 56'	(substituted off) 79'
PR	17	George Bower	(substituted on) 49'
PR	18	Pasilio Tosi	(substituted on) 59'
BR	19	Shannon Frizell	(substituted on) 59'
BR	20	Anton Segner	(substituted on) 53'	(substituted off) 79'
SH	21	Kyle Preston	(substituted on) 70'
CE	22	Rieko Ioane	(substituted on) 70'
WG	23	Josh Moorby	(substituted on) 68'
Coach:
Dave Rennie

FB	15	Tom Wright
RW	14	Max Jorgensen
OC	13	Isaac Henry
IC	12	Len Ikitau	(substituted off) 30'
LW	11	Joseph-Aukuso Suaalii
FH	10	Ben Donaldson	(substituted off) 68'
SH	9	Ryan Lonergan	(substituted off) 63'
N8	8	Harry Wilson (c)
OF	7	Fraser McReight
BF	6	Rob Valetini	(substituted off) 72'
RL	5	Lukhan Salakaia-Loto
LL	4	Jeremy Williams	(substituted off) 59'
TP	3	Allan Alaalatoa	(substituted off) 52'
HK	2	Brandon Paenga-Amosa	(substituted off) 47'
LP	1	Angus Bell	(substituted off) 58'
Substitutions:
HK	16	Josh Nasser	(substituted on) 47'
PR	17	Aidan Ross	(substituted on) 58'
PR	18	Massimo de Lutiis	(substituted on) 52'
LK	19	Lachlan Shaw	(substituted on) 59'
BR	20	Nick Champion de Crespigny	(substituted on) 72'
SH	21	Tate McDermott	(substituted on) 63'
FH	22	Declan Meredith	(substituted on) 58'
WG	23	Harry Potter	(substituted on) 30'
Coach:
Les Kiss

Player of the Match:
Cam Roigard (New Zealand)

Assistant referees:
Luke Pearce (England)
Damián Schneider (Argentina)
Television match official:
Mike Adamson (Scotland)
Foul play review officer:
Marius van der Westhuizen (South Africa)

Notes:

- New Zealand retained the Bledisloe Cup.

=== Second test ===
17 October 2026
15:45 AEDT (UTC+11)

Australia	21–43	New Zealand
Try: Williams 29' c Wright 54' c Daugunu 66' c Con: Lonergan (2/2) 30', 55'; Meredith (1/1) 67'	Report	Try: Moorby (2) 12' m, 43' c B. Barrett (2) 17' m, 40+1' c Lakai 21' c Ioane 26' c Sititi 32' c Con: McKenzie (4/6) 22', 33', 40+2', 44'

Stadium Australia, Sydney
Attendance: 73,399
Referee: Luke Pearce (England)

FB	15	Tom Wright
RW	14	Max Jorgensen
OC	13	Joseph-Aukuso Suaalii
IC	12	Isaac Henry
LW	11	Harry Potter		(substituted off) 55'
FH	10	Declan Meredith		(substituted off) 73'
SH	9	Ryan Lonergan		(substituted off) 65'
N8	8	Harry Wilson (c)
OF	7	Fraser McReight
BF	6	Rob Valetini		(substituted off) 44'
RL	5	Lukhan Salakaia-Loto		(substituted off) 49'
LL	4	Jeremy Williams	(yellow card) 31'
TP	3	Allan Alaalatoa		(substituted off) 48'
HK	2	Josh Nasser		(substituted off) 48'
LP	1	Aidan Ross		(substituted off) 41'
Substitutions:
HK	16	Billy Pollard		(substituted on) 48'
PR	17	Angus Bell		(substituted on) 41'
PR	18	Massimo de Lutiis		(substituted on) 48'
LK	19	Josh Canham		(substituted on) 44'
BR	20	Carlo Tizzano		(substituted on) 49'
SH	21	Kalani Thomas		(substituted on) 65'
FH	22	Harry McLaughlin-Phillips		(substituted on) 73'
WG	23	Filipo Daugunu		(substituted on) 55'
Coach:
Les Kiss

FB	15	Beauden Barrett
RW	14	Will Jordan		(substituted off) 41'
OC	13	Quinn Tupaea		(substituted off) 2'
IC	12	Timoci Tavatavanawai		(substituted off) 69'
LW	11	Josh Moorby
FH	10	Damian McKenzie
SH	9	Cam Roigard		(substituted off) 68'
N8	8	Wallace Sititi		(substituted off) 55'
OF	7	Peter Lakai
BF	6	Tupou Vaa'i
RL	5	Fabian Holland
LL	4	Scott Barrett
TP	3	Fletcher Newell		(substituted off) 50'
HK	2	Codie Taylor (c)		(substituted off) 50'	(substituted on) 69'
LP	1	George Bower		(substituted off) 50'
Substitutions:
HK	16	Samisoni Taukei'aho		(substituted on) 50'	(substituted off) 69'
PR	17	Xavier Numia		(substituted on) 50'
PR	18	Pasilio Tosi		(substituted on) 50'
BR	19	Shannon Frizell		(substituted on) 55'	(substituted off) 61'
BR	20	Du'Plessis Kirifi			(substituted on) 61'
SH	21	Cortez Ratima		(substituted on) 68'
WG	22	Chay Fihaki	(yellow card) 75'	(substituted on) 41'
CE	23	Rieko Ioane		(substituted on) 2'
Coach:
Dave Rennie

Assistant referees:
Andrew Brace (Ireland)
Damián Schneider (Argentina)
Television match official:
Marius van der Westhuizen (South Africa)
Foul play review officer:
Mike Adamson (Scotland)

Notes:

- Harry McLaughlin-Phillips (Australia) and Chay Fihaki (New Zealand) made their international Test debuts.
- Lukhan Salakaia-Loto earned his 50th Test cap for Australia.
- Beauden Barrett (New Zealand) became the all-time leading try-scorer against Australia in Test rugby with 13.

== Statistics ==
=== Points scorers ===
Pos.	Player	Team	Pts.
1	Damian McKenzie	New Zealand	23
2	Josh Moorby	New Zealand	15
3	Beauden Barrett	New Zealand	10
3	Peter Lakai	New Zealand	10
3	Tom Wright	Australia	10
6	Ryan Lonergan	Australia	8
7	Leroy Carter	New Zealand	5
7	Filipo Daugunu	Australia	5
7	Rieko Ioane	New Zealand	5
7	Will Jordan	New Zealand	5
7	Josh Nasser	Australia	5
7	Cam Roigard	New Zealand	5
7	Wallace Sititi	New Zealand	5
7	Codie Taylor	New Zealand	5
7	Tupou Vaa'i	New Zealand	5
7	Jeremy Williams	Australia	5
7	Harry Wilson	Australia	5
18	Declan Meredith	Australia	2

=== Try scorers ===
Pos.	Player	Team	Tries
1	Josh Moorby	New Zealand	3
2	Beauden Barrett	New Zealand	2
2	Peter Lakai	New Zealand	2
2	Tom Wright	Australia	2
5	Leroy Carter	New Zealand	1
5	Filipo Daugunu	Australia	1
5	Rieko Ioane	New Zealand	1
5	Will Jordan	New Zealand	1
5	Josh Nasser	Australia	1
5	Cam Roigard	New Zealand	1
5	Wallace Sititi	New Zealand	1
5	Codie Taylor	New Zealand	1
5	Tupou Vaa'i	New Zealand	1
5	Jeremy Williams	Australia	1
5	Harry Wilson	Australia	1

== See also ==
- 2026 Australia tour of Argentina
- 2026 New Zealand tour of South Africa
- 2026 men's rugby union internationals
