= 2026 Australia–Japan rugby union test series =

Australia–Japan test series
Japan	Australia
0	2

First test
Japan	Australia
32	35
- Match details
- Date: 8 August
- Venue: Hanazono Rugby Stadium, Higashiōsaka

Second test
Australia	Japan
56	17
- Match details
- Date: 15 August
- Venue: North Queensland Stadium, Townsville

The Australia and Japan national rugby teams toured each other in a two-test, home-and-away series in August 2026. The tour was known as the 2026 Lipovitan-D Challenge Cup in Japan (Japanese: リポビタンDチャレンジカップ2026), and the 2026 Flight Centre Series in Australia for sponsorship reasons. The matches were confirmed by Rugby Australia (RA) in November 2025 following the restructuring of the annual Rugby Championship into a revised cycle, under which the competition is held in three consecutive years (2027, 2028, 2029) before being postponed in the fourth (2030, to make way for the 2026 and 2030 New Zealand/South Africa tours.

Australia won the series 2–0 after defeating Japan in a close match in Osaka, before winning the series in the following test in Australia, winning by 39 points.

== Background ==
Prior to 2017, encounters between Australia and Japan were sparse. The two nations met only four times in test matches: twice during Japan's 1975 tour of Australia, and twice in the Rugby World Cup (RWC). From 2017 onward, fixtures between the sides became more regular, and domestic teams from both countries began engaging in pre-season and post-season tours, most notably the Queensland Reds, New South Wales Waratahs, Saitama Wild Knights, and Kubota Spears.

The Australia–Japan rugby relationship intensified significantly during 2023–2024, following revelations by The Sydney Morning Herald that Wallabies head coach Eddie Jones had been in discussions regarding a return to the Japan national coaching role while still in charge of Australia during the 2023 Rugby World Cup. The episode attracted significant scrutiny in the Australian media (Eddie Jones § JRFU controversy).

== Schedule ==
Date	Venue	Home	Score	Away
8 August	Hanazono Rugby Stadium, Higashiōsaka	Japan	32–35	Australia
15 August	North Queensland Stadium, Townsville	Australia	56–17	Japan

== Venues ==
Australia's venue was confirmed on 26 November 2025, following Rugby Australia's release of their 2026 schedule. The venue, known as North Queensland Stadium and located in Townsville, had only hosted three test matches at the time of the announcement. In February 2026, the Japan Rugby Football Union released their 2026 schedule, and revealed their home test would be played at Hanazono Rugby Stadium in Higashiōsaka. Both teams were yet to face one another at each other's designated home venues, with Japan having not played Australia on Australian soil since the inaugural Rugby World Cup in 1987.

Japan	Location of the Australia–Japan test Series venues: Japan; 1 Hanazono Rugby Stadium, Higashiōsaka; Australia; 2 North Queensland Stadium, Townsville
Higashiōsaka	Location of the Australia–Japan test Series venues: Japan; 1 Hanazono Rugby Stadium, Higashiōsaka; Australia; 2 North Queensland Stadium, Townsville
Hanazono Rugby Stadium	Location of the Australia–Japan test Series venues: Japan; 1 Hanazono Rugby Stadium, Higashiōsaka; Australia; 2 North Queensland Stadium, Townsville
Capacity: 30,000	Location of the Australia–Japan test Series venues: Japan; 1 Hanazono Rugby Stadium, Higashiōsaka; Australia; 2 North Queensland Stadium, Townsville
Australia	Location of the Australia–Japan test Series venues: Japan; 1 Hanazono Rugby Stadium, Higashiōsaka; Australia; 2 North Queensland Stadium, Townsville
Townsville	Location of the Australia–Japan test Series venues: Japan; 1 Hanazono Rugby Stadium, Higashiōsaka; Australia; 2 North Queensland Stadium, Townsville
North Queensland Stadium	Location of the Australia–Japan test Series venues: Japan; 1 Hanazono Rugby Stadium, Higashiōsaka; Australia; 2 North Queensland Stadium, Townsville
Capacity: 25,455	Location of the Australia–Japan test Series venues: Japan; 1 Hanazono Rugby Stadium, Higashiōsaka; Australia; 2 North Queensland Stadium, Townsville

== Squads ==
Caps and ages are as of the first match of the series (8 August 2026).

=== Australia ===
On 23 July 2026, new coach Les Kiss named a 34-man squad ahead of the two-test series against Japan. Only three new players were named in the team from Australia's previous squad that took part in the 2026 Nations Championship Southern Hemisphere Series in June.

On 5 August, Massimo de Lutiis was added to the Wallabies squad as training cover for Zane Nonggorr who suffered a minor calf strain.

On 10 August, Tom Hooper was added to the Wallabies squad. On 11 August Joseph-Aukuso Sua'ali'i was ruled out of the second test due to injury and was replaced by Josh Flook.

Head Coach: Les Kiss

Player	Position	Date of birth (age)	Caps	Club/province
Josh Nasser	Hooker	23 June 1999 (aged 27)	13	(Australia) Reds
Brandon Paenga-Amosa	Hooker	25 December 1995 (aged 30)	28	(Australia) Force
Billy Pollard	Hooker	9 December 2001 (aged 24)	21	(Australia) Brumbies
Isaac Aedo Kailea	Prop	13 July 2000 (aged 26)	8	(Australia) Waratahs
Allan Alaalatoa	Prop	28 January 1994 (aged 32)	91	(Australia) Brumbies
Angus Bell	Prop	4 October 2000 (aged 25)	53	(Australia) Waratahs
Massimo de Lutiis	Prop	18 November 2003 (aged 22)	0	(Australia) Reds
Zane Nonggorr	Prop	30 March 2001 (aged 25)	20	(Australia) Reds
Aidan Ross	Prop	25 October 1995 (aged 30)	3	(Australia) Reds
Taniela Tupou	Prop	10 May 1996 (aged 30)	70	(France) Racing 92
Miles Amatosero	Lock	15 June 2002 (aged 24)	1	(Australia) Waratahs
Josh Canham	Lock	1 February 2001 (aged 25)	5	(Australia) Reds
Lukhan Salakaia-Loto	Lock	19 September 1996 (aged 29)	45	(Australia) Reds
Lachlan Shaw	Lock	15 May 2003 (aged 23)	2	(Australia) Brumbies
Jeremy Williams	Lock	2 December 2000 (aged 25)	28	(Australia) Force
Charlie Cale	Back row	6 October 2000 (aged 25)	2	(Australia) Brumbies
Tom Hooper	Back row	29 January 2001 (aged 25)	23	(England) Exeter Chiefs
Fraser McReight	Back row	19 February 1999 (aged 27)	42	(Australia) Reds
Carlo Tizzano	Back row	2 February 2000 (aged 26)	15	(Australia) Force
Rob Valetini	Back row	3 September 1998 (aged 27)	65	(Australia) Brumbies
Harry Wilson (c)	Back row	22 November 1999 (aged 26)	39	(Australia) Reds
Ryan Lonergan	Scrum-half	6 April 1998 (aged 28)	8	(Australia) Brumbies
Tate McDermott	Scrum-half	18 September 1998 (aged 27)	53	(Australia) Reds
Kalani Thomas	Scrum-half	18 April 2002 (aged 24)	1	(Australia) Reds
Ben Donaldson	Fly-half	4 April 1999 (aged 27)	21	(Australia) Force
Carter Gordon	Fly-half	29 January 2001 (aged 25)	10	(Australia) Reds
Declan Meredith	Fly-half	28 June 1999 (aged 27)	2	(Australia) Brumbies
Josh Flook	Centre	22 September 2001 (aged 24)	6	(Australia) Reds
Isaac Henry	Centre	8 March 1999 (aged 27)	0	(Australia) Reds
Hunter Paisami	Centre	10 April 1999 (aged 27)	35	(Australia) Reds
Joseph Sua'ali'i	Centre	1 August 2003 (aged 23)	21	(Australia) Waratahs
Filipo Daugunu	Wing	4 March 1995 (aged 31)	22	(Australia) Reds
Max Jorgensen	Wing	2 September 2004 (aged 21)	23	(Australia) Waratahs
Dylan Pietsch	Wing	23 April 1998 (aged 28)	11	(Australia) Force
Harry Potter	Wing	15 December 1997 (aged 28)	12	(Australia) Waratahs
Jock Campbell	Fullback	17 May 1995 (aged 31)	6	(Australia) Reds
Tom Wright	Fullback	21 July 1997 (aged 29)	46	(Australia) Brumbies

=== Japan ===
On 23 July 2026, Japan announced a 34-man training camp ahead of the two test series.

On 10 August, Keijiro Tamefusa, Haruto Watanabe, Shota Taira, and Kippei Ishida were dropped for the second test. Takumi Inaba, Yuki Ikeda, and Sam Greene came in as replacements.

Head Coach: Eddie Jones

Player	Position	Date of birth (age)	Caps	Club/province
Hayate Era	Hooker	18 September 2001 (aged 24)	9	(Japan) Kubota Spears
Mamoru Harada	Hooker	15 April 1999 (aged 27)	14	(Japan) Toshiba Brave Lupus
Kenji Sato	Hooker	4 January 2003 (aged 23)	10	(Japan) Saitama Wild Knights
Kanato Hirano	Prop	8 February 2000 (aged 26)	0	(Japan) Tochigi Honda Heat
Takumi Inaba	Prop	24 July 2002 (aged 24)	0	(Japan) Shizuoka Blue Revs
Takato Okabe	Prop	19 February 1995 (aged 31)	11	(Japan) Yokohama Canon Eagles
Sojiro Otsuka	Prop	5 July 2004 (aged 22)	3	(Japan) Kwansei Gakuin University
Izi Sword	Prop	7 June 2001 (aged 25)	1	(Japan) Kubota Spears
Shuhei Takeuchi	Prop	9 December 1997 (aged 28)	26	(Japan) Tokyo Sungoliath
Keijiro Tamefusa	Prop	3 September 2001 (aged 24)	23	(Japan) Kubota Spears
Jack Cornelsen	Lock	13 October 1994 (aged 31)	32	(Japan) Saitama Wild Knights
Warner Dearns	Lock	11 April 2002 (aged 24)	35	(Japan) Toshiba Brave Lupus
Harry Hockings	Lock	28 July 1998 (aged 28)	5	(Japan) Tokyo Sungoliath
Michael Stolberg	Lock	27 March 1992 (aged 34)	3	(Japan) Toshiba Brave Lupus
Tiennan Costley	Back row	14 June 2000 (aged 26)	14	(Japan) Kobe Steelers
Ben Gunter	Back row	24 October 1997 (aged 28)	20	(Japan) Saitama Wild Knights
Esei Ha'angana	Back row	21 April 1999 (aged 27)	1	(Japan) Urayasu D-Rocks
Michael Leitch	Back row	7 October 1988 (aged 37)	95	(Japan) Toshiba Brave Lupus
Faulua Makisi	Back row	20 February 1997 (aged 29)	23	(Japan) Kubota Spears
Kanji Shimokawa	Back row	17 January 1999 (aged 27)	25	(Japan) Tokyo Sungoliath
Itsuki Kamimura	Scrum-half	13 December 2002 (aged 23)	2	(Japan) Kobe Steelers
Naoto Saitō	Scrum-half	26 August 1997 (aged 28)	31	(Japan) Tokyo Sungoliath
Haruto Watanabe	Scrum-half	10 December 2004 (aged 21)	0	(Japan) Kindai University
Ryūnosuke Itō	Fly-half	10 November 2004 (aged 21)	3	(Japan) Meiji University
Samisoni Tua	Fly-half	24 May 1995 (aged 31)	4	(Japan) Urayasu D-Rocks
Yuki Ikeda	Centre	21 May 1995 (aged 31)	2	(Japan) Black Rams Tokyo
Dylan Riley	Centre	2 May 1997 (aged 29)	41	(Japan) Saitama Wild Knights
Shota Taira	Centre	18 December 2003 (aged 22)	0	(Japan) Sagamihara DynaBoars
Inoke Burua	Wing	30 May 1999 (aged 27)	0	(Japan) Kobe Steelers
Kippei Ishida	Wing	28 April 2000 (aged 26)	11	(Japan) Yokohama Canon Eagles
Haruto Kida	Wing	9 April 1999 (aged 27)	2	(Japan) Kubota Spears
Taira Main	Wing	5 September 2000 (aged 25)	3	(Japan) Black Rams Tokyo
Kazuma Ueda	Wing	4 December 2002 (aged 23)	5	(Japan) Kobe Steelers
Sam Greene	Fullback	16 August 1994 (aged 31)	7	(Japan) Shizuoka Blue Revs
Takurō Matsunaga	Fullback	13 August 1998 (aged 27)	8	(Japan) Toshiba Brave Lupus Tokyo
Shunsuke Uenobo	Fullback	29 September 2003 (aged 22)	1	(Japan) Kobe Steelers
Yoshitaka Yazaki	Fullback	12 May 2004 (aged 22)	9	(Japan) Waseda University

== Test series ==
=== First test ===
8 August 2026
19:05 JST (UTC+9)

Japan	32–35	Australia
Try: Itō 12' c Makisi 34' c Ueda 45' m Dearns 78' c Con: Matsunaga (3/4) 13', 35', 79'; Pen: Matsunaga (2/2) 53', 59'	Report	Try: Potter 15' c Wright 26' c Jorgensen 42' c McReight 49' c Tupou 70' m Con: Lonergan (4/4) 16', 27', 43', 50'; Donaldson (1/1) 71'

Hanazono Rugby Stadium, Higashiōsaka
Attendance: 21,322
Referee: Eoghan Cross (Ireland)

Japan	Australia

FB	15	Takurō Matsunaga
RW	14	Kazuma Ueda
OC	13	Dylan Riley	(substituted off) 66'
IC	12	Samisoni Tua
LW	11	Taira Main	(substituted off) 57'
FH	10	Ryūnosuke Itō
SH	9	Naoto Saitō
N8	8	Faulua Makisi	(substituted off) 63'
OF	7	Kanji Shimokawa	(substituted off) 60'
BF	6	Ben Gunter
RL	5	Warner Dearns (c)
LL	4	Jack Cornelsen	(substituted off) 65'
TP	3	Shuhei Takeuchi	(substituted off) 66'
HK	2	Hayate Era	(substituted off) 56'
LP	1	Takato Okabe	(substituted off) 63'
Substitutions:
PR	16	Mamoru Harada	(substituted on) 57'
HK	17	Sojiro Otsuka	(substituted on) 63'
PR	18	Keijiro Tamefusa	(substituted on) 66'
LK	19	Harry Hockings	(substituted on) 65'
BR	20	Michael Leitch	(substituted on) 60'
BR	21	Tiennan Costley	(substituted on) 63'
FB	22	Shunsuke Uenobo	(substituted on) 66'
FB	23	Yoshitaka Yazaki	(substituted on) 56'
Coach:
Eddie Jones

FB	15	Tom Wright		(substituted off) 72'
RW	14	Max Jorgensen
OC	13	Joseph Sua'ali'i
IC	12	Hunter Paisami
LW	11	Harry Potter		(substituted off) 63'
FH	10	Declan Meredith
SH	9	Ryan Lonergan		(substituted off) 63'
N8	8	Harry Wilson (c)
OF	7	Fraser McReight
BF	6	Rob Valetini		(substituted off) 63'
RL	5	Miles Amatosero	(red card) 32'
LL	4	Josh Canham
TP	3	Allan Alaalatoa		(substituted off) 54'
HK	2	Josh Nasser		(substituted off) 54'
LP	1	Aidan Ross		(substituted off) 40'
Substitutions:
HK	16	Billy Pollard		(substituted on) 54'
PR	17	Angus Bell		(substituted on) 40'
PR	18	Taniela Tupou		(substituted on) 54'
LK	19	Jeremy Williams		(substituted on) 54'
BR	20	Charlie Cale		(substituted on) 63'
SH	21	Tate McDermott		(substituted on) 63'
FH	22	Ben Donaldson		(substituted on) 63'
CE	23	Isaac Henry		(substituted on) 72'
Coach:
Les Kiss

Assistant referees:
Paul Williams (New Zealand)
Morgan White (Hong Kong China)
Television match official:
Richard Kelly (New Zealand)
Foul play review officer:
Matt Rodden (Hong Kong China)

Notes:

- Isaac Henry (Australia) made his international debut.
- Japan's 32 points was the most they had scored against Australia in a test match, surpassing their previous record of 30 set in 2017.

=== Second test ===
15 August 2026
15:15 AEST (UTC+10)

Australia	56–17	Japan
Try: Nasser 7' c Tupou (2) 17' c, 39' c Bell 51' c de Lutiis 58' c Cale 73' c Wilson 75' c Paenga-Amosa 81' c Con: Lonergan (5/5) 8', 18', 40', 52', 60'; Donaldson (3/3) 74', 76', 82'	Report	Try: Hockings 5' m Saitō 26' c Riley 34' m Con: Matsunaga (1/3) 27'

North Queensland Stadium, Townsville
Attendance: 18,076
Referee: Paul Williams (New Zealand)

Australia	Japan

FB	15	Tom Wright
RW	14	Max Jorgensen	(substituted off) 66'
OC	13	Hunter Paisami
IC	12	Isaac Henry
LW	11	Harry Potter
FH	10	Carter Gordon	(substituted off) 60'
SH	9	Ryan Lonergan	(substituted off) 60'
N8	8	Harry Wilson (c)
OF	7	Carlo Tizzano
BF	6	Charlie Cale
RL	5	Lukhan Salakaia-Loto	(substituted off) 50'
LL	4	Lachlan Shaw	(substituted off) 69'
TP	3	Taniela Tupou	(substituted off) 50'
HK	2	Josh Nasser	(substituted off) 41'
LP	1	Angus Bell	(substituted off) 60'
Substitutions:
HK	16	Brandon Paenga-Amosa	(substituted on) 41'
PR	17	Aidan Ross	(substituted on) 60'
PR	18	Massimo de Lutiis	(substituted on) 50'
LK	19	Jeremy Williams	(substituted on) 50'
BR	20	Fraser McReight	(substituted on) 69'
SH	21	Tate McDermott	(substituted on) 60'
FH	22	Ben Donaldson	(substituted on) 60'
CE	23	Filipo Daugunu	(substituted on) 66'
Coach:
Les Kiss

FB	15	Takurō Matsunaga
RW	14	Yoshitaka Yazaki
OC	13	Dylan Riley
IC	12	Shunsuke Uenobo
LW	11	Haruto Kida		(substituted off) 41'
FH	10	Ryūnosuke Itō
SH	9	Naoto Saitō		(substituted off) 71'
N8	8	Faulua Makisi		(substituted off) 59'
OF	7	Tiennan Costley		(substituted off) 50'
BF	6	Ben Gunter			(substituted off) 77'
RL	5	Warner Dearns (c)
LL	4	Harry Hockings
TP	3	Shuhei Takeuchi		(substituted off) 68'
HK	2	Hayate Era		(substituted off) 59'	(substituted on) 77'
LP	1	Takato Okabe		(substituted off) 50'
Substitutions:
HK	16	Mamoru Harada	(yellow card) 76'	(substituted on) 59'
PR	17	Sojiro Otsuka		(substituted on) 50'
PR	18	Izi Sword		(substituted on) 68'
LK	19	Jack Cornelsen		(substituted on) 59'
BR	20	Michael Leitch		(substituted on) 50'
SH	21	Itsuki Kamimura		(substituted on) 71'
FH	22	Samisoni Tua			(substituted on) 71'
WG	23	Kazuma Ueda		(substituted on) 41'	(substituted off) 71'
Coach:
Eddie Jones

Assistant referees:
Angus Mabey (New Zealand)
Marcus Playle (New Zealand)
Television match official:
Glenn Newman (New Zealand)
Foul play review officer:
Richard Kelly (New Zealand)

Notes:

- Massimo de Lutiis (Australia) made his international debut, becoming Wallaby No. 1000.
- In three test matches, this was Australia's largest score at North Queensland Stadium, surpassing their previous high of 28 points in 2025.

== Statistics ==
=== Points scorers ===
Pos.	Player	Team	Pts.
1	Ryan Lonergan	Australia	18
2	Taniela Tupou	Australia	15
3	Takurō Matsunaga	Japan	14
4	Ben Donaldson	Australia	8
5	Harry Potter	Australia	5
5	Tom Wright	Australia	5
5	Max Jorgensen	Australia	5
5	Fraser McReight	Australia	5
5	Ryūnosuke Itō	Japan	5
5	Faulua Makisi	Japan	5
5	Kazuma Ueda	Japan	5
5	Warner Dearns	Japan	5
5	Harry Hockings	Japan	5
5	Josh Nasser	Australia	5
5	Angus Bell	Australia	5
5	Massimo de Lutiis	Australia	5
5	Charlie Cale	Australia	5
5	Harry Wilson	Australia	5
5	Brandon Paenga-Amosa	Australia	5

=== Try scorers ===
Pos.	Player	Team	Tries
1	Taniela Tupou	Australia	3
2	Ryūnosuke Itō	Japan	1
2	Max Jorgensen	Australia	1
2	Faulua Makisi	Japan	1
2	Kazuma Ueda	Japan	1
2	Warner Dearns	Japan	1
2	Harry Potter	Australia	1
2	Tom Wright	Australia	1
2	Fraser McReight	Australia	1
2	Josh Nasser	Australia	1
2	Angus Bell	Australia	1
2	Massimo de Lutiis	Australia	1
2	Charlie Cale	Australia	1
2	Harry Wilson	Australia	1
2	Brandon Paenga-Amosa	Australia	1
2	Naoto Saitō	Japan	1
2	Dylan Riley	Japan	1
2	Harry Hockings	Japan	1

== See also ==
- 2026 Australia tour of Argentina
- 2026 New Zealand tour of South Africa
- 2026 men's rugby union internationals
