= 2020 Tri Nations Series =

Annual rugby union competition

Tournament details
- Host: Australia
- Date: 31 October – 5 December 2020
- Countries: Argentina; Australia; New Zealand

Final positions
- Champions: New Zealand (17th title)
- Bledisloe Cup: New Zealand
- Puma Trophy: Australia

Tournament statistics
- Matches played: 6
- Tries scored: 22 (3.67 per match)
- Attendance: 102,605 (17,101 per match)
- Top scorer(s): Nicolás Sánchez (43)
- Most tries: Richie Mo'unga (2); Rieko Ioane (2); Dane Coles (2); Will Jordan (2)

The 2020 Tri Nations Series (Note: Known for sponsorship reasons as The Investec Tri Nations Series in New Zealand, The eToro Tri Nations Series in Australia, and The Personal Tri Nations Series in Argentina.) was the seventeenth edition of the annual southern hemisphere competition, involving Argentina, Australia and New Zealand. On 16 October 2020, 2019 Rugby Championship winners and 2019 Rugby World Cup champions South Africa confirmed their withdrawal from the originally planned 2020 Rugby Championship due to South African government travel restrictions, player welfare and safety concerns related to COVID-19. This meant that the competition temporarily returned to its previous Tri-Nations format; played across six weekends with each team playing each other twice.

As a result of the COVID-19 pandemic, the tournament was moved to later in the year than usual. It had been mooted that all matches might be played in New Zealand, however, in September 2020 it was announced that all matches would be held in Australia rather than in all of the competing nations.

== Background ==
The format for the 2020 tournament should have returned to the previous Championship format which was used in 2018, after the shortening of the 2019 edition due to the World Cup. Each side would have played the others once at home and once away, giving a total of six matches each, and twelve in total. A win earns a team four league points, a draw two league points, and a loss by eight or more points zero league points. A bonus point is earned in one of two ways: by scoring at least three tries more than the opponent in a match, or losing by seven points or fewer. The competition winner is the side with the most points at the end of the tournament.

The competition went through several schedule changes throughout 2020. The dates and venues for the original tournament were confirmed on 4 February, with South Africa being the final nation to announce their home Tests for the first half of the international season. New Zealand Rugby, the Argentine Rugby Union, and Rugby Australia announced their Test schedules for the 2020 Rugby Championship on 2 December 2019, 8 January and 30 January respectively. These dates ultimately changed due to the COVID-19 pandemic and a second schedule was released, where double-headed games would take place in Australia across six weekends. On 8 October, the schedule was revised to allow a quarantine period for New Zealand on their return home (to avoid a clash with Christmas), and therefore round six was split and the Australia v New Zealand game moved to 31 October. Following the withdrawal of South Africa from the tournament, the competition reverted to its Tri-Nations format (not played since Argentina joined the competition in 2012) with the tournament played over six consecutive weekends with only one game played each round, rather than the originally planned double headers.

The global quarantining measures and need to maintain a bubble meant that match official neutrality was not possible, and the team of match officials came from Australia and New Zealand. All coaches were supportive of this necessary position - including the two Australia-New Zealand games which were fairly appointed in the same manner as that of the first two Bledisloe Cup matches.

=== Overview ===
The 2020 Tri Nations Series had multiple elements of the unknown; they have come about as a result of many changes within the national setups, as is often the case in a year post-World Cup. The 2020 tournament sees a mix of the outgoing World Champions and current World No. 2 ranked All Blacks, an expected resurgent Wallabies (World Ranking of 6th), and a Los Pumas side (ranked 11th) looking to build on their 2019 record and the preceding 2020 Super Rugby season, all clashing heads.

A number of senior players retired from International duty from all four of the sides at the conclusion of the 2019 season and new Head Coaches were appointed, including significantly new coaching setups at the All Blacks, Wallabies and Springboks. The Rugby Championship was the first testing ground for the three teams since their respective changes, and the first round of International Rugby for them all since the 2019 Rugby World Cup, after the July Internationals were either cancelled or postponed due to the COVID-19 pandemic.

=== Other cups ===
The Bledisloe Cup, Mandela Challenge Plate, Freedom Cup and the Puma Trophy are contested annually during the Rugby Championship by select teams.

The Bledisloe Cup is traditionally contested by Australia and New Zealand in two home-and-away legs, with an additional leg in non-World Cup years, as is the case in 2020. However, due to the special circumstances of this edition due to the COVID-19 pandemic, the Bledisloe Cup was contested over four Tests: two stand-alone matches played in New Zealand in October in consecutive Sundays, and a further two to be hosted in Australia which will double as the first two Rugby Championship fixtures. New Zealand retained the trophy for an 18th consecutive year after winning Game 2 (27-7) and Game 3 (5-43); Australia won Game 4 (24-22), and Game 1 finished in a 16-all draw.

Unlike the Bledisloe Cup, the Mandela Challenge Plate (contested between Australia and South Africa), the Freedom Cup (contested between New Zealand and South Africa) and the Puma Trophy (Argentina and Australia) are not decided by a third match. The teams play each other twice during the Rugby Championship (but only once in Rugby World Cup years), and the challengers are required to beat the holders in both games to win the plate or trophy.

== Table ==
Pos	Team	Pld	W	D	L	PF	PA	PD	TF	TA	TB	LB	Pts
1	New Zealand	4	2	0	2	118	54	+64	16	4	2	1	11
2	Argentina	4	1	2	1	56	84	−28	2	8	0	0	8
3	Australia (H)	4	1	2	1	60	96	−36	4	10	0	0	8

Source: SANZAAR
(H) Host

== Fixtures ==
=== Matchday 1 ===
31 October 2020
19:45 AEDT (UTC+11)

Australia	5–43	New Zealand (1 BP)
Try: Lolesio 42' m	Report	Try: Tu'inukuafe 5' c Mo'unga (2) 22' m, 26' c Coles 30' c R. Ioane 71' c J. Barrett 73' c Con: Mo'unga (5/6) 6', 27', 31', 72', 74'; Pen: Mo'unga (1/1) 59'

Stadium Australia, Sydney
Attendance: 25,689
Referee: Ben O'Keeffe (New Zealand)

FB	15	Dane Haylett-Petty
RW	14	Filipo Daugunu	(yellow card) 2' to 12'
OC	13	Jordan Petaia
IC	12	Irae Simone		(substituted off) 53'	(substituted on) 62'	(substituted off) 67'
LW	11	Marika Koroibete
FH	10	Noah Lolesio		(substituted off) 63'
SH	9	Nic White		(substituted off) 60'
N8	8	Harry Wilson		(substituted off) 67'
OF	7	Michael Hooper (c)
BF	6	Ned Hanigan
RL	5	Matt Philip
LL	4	Lukhan Salakaia-Loto		(substituted off) 45'
TP	3	Allan Alaalatoa		(substituted off) 53'
HK	2	Brandon Paenga-Amosa		(substituted off) 60'
LP	1	James Slipper		(substituted off) 60'
Replacements:
HK	16	Jordan Uelese		(substituted on) 60'
PR	17	Scott Sio		(substituted on) 60'
PR	18	Taniela Tupou		(substituted on) 53'
LK	19	Rob Simmons		(substituted on) 45'
FL	20	Fraser McReight		(substituted on) 67'
SH	21	Tate McDermott		(substituted on) 60'
CE	22	Reece Hodge		(substituted on) 63'
CE	23	Hunter Paisami		(substituted on) 53'	(substituted off) 62'	(substituted on) 67'
Coach:
(New Zealand) Dave Rennie

FB	15	Beauden Barrett		(substituted off) 65'
RW	14	Jordie Barrett	(yellow card) 8' to 18'
OC	13	Anton Lienert-Brown
IC	12	Jack Goodhue		(substituted off) 60'
LW	11	Caleb Clarke
FH	10	Richie Mo'unga
SH	9	Aaron Smith		(substituted off) 54'
N8	8	Hoskins Sotutu
OF	7	Sam Cane (c)		(substituted off) 67'
BF	6	Shannon Frizell	(yellow card) 79' to 80'
RL	5	Sam Whitelock
LL	4	Patrick Tuipulotu		(substituted off) 54'
TP	3	Ofa Tu'ungafasi		(substituted off) 57'
HK	2	Dane Coles		(substituted off) 45'
LP	1	Karl Tu'inukuafe		(substituted off) 45'
Replacements:
HK	16	Codie Taylor		(substituted on) 45'
PR	17	Alex Hodgman		(substituted on) 45'
PR	18	Tyrel Lomax		(substituted on) 57'
LK	19	Scott Barrett		(substituted on) 54'
FL	20	Dalton Papalii		(substituted on) 67'
SH	21	TJ Perenara		(substituted on) 54'
CE	22	Ngani Laumape		(substituted on) 60'
CE	23	Rieko Ioane		(substituted on) 65'
Coach:
(New Zealand) Ian Foster

Assistant referees:
Paul Williams (New Zealand)
Nic Berry (Australia)
Television match official:
Angus Gardner (Australia)

Notes:

- Noah Lolesio, Fraser McReight, Tate McDermott and Irae Simone (all Australia) made their international debuts.
- New Zealand retained the Bledisloe Cup for the 18th consecutive time.
- New Zealand recorded their largest winning margin over Australia, surpassing the 37-point difference set in 1996.

=== Matchday 2 ===
7 November 2020
19:45 AEDT (UTC+11)

Australia	24–22	New Zealand (1 BP)
Try: Wright 2' m Tupou 74' c Con: Hodge (1/2) 76'; Pen: Hodge (4/5) 21', 49', 58', 69'	Report	Try: R. Ioane 9' m Taylor 51' c Vaa'i 79' c Con: J. Barrett (2/3) 52', 79'; Pen: J. Barrett (1/1) 33'

Lang Park, Brisbane
Attendance: 36,000
Referee: Nic Berry (Australia)

FB	15	Tom Banks
RW	14	Tom Wright		(substituted off) 73'
OC	13	Jordan Petaia		(substituted off) 65'
IC	12	Hunter Paisami
LW	11	Marika Koroibete	(yellow card) 40' to 50'
FH	10	Reece Hodge
SH	9	Nic White		(substituted off) 68'
N8	8	Harry Wilson		(substituted off) 69'
OF	7	Michael Hooper (c)
BF	6	Lachlan Swinton	(red card) 34'
RL	5	Matt Philip
LL	4	Rob Simmons		(substituted off) 53'
TP	3	Allan Alaalatoa		(substituted off) 53'
HK	2	Brandon Paenga-Amosa		(substituted off) 65'
LP	1	James Slipper		(substituted off) 40'
Replacements:
HK	16	Folau Fainga'a		(substituted on) 65'
PR	17	Angus Bell		(substituted on) 40'
PR	18	Taniela Tupou		(substituted on) 53'
LK	19	Ned Hanigan		(substituted on) 53'
FL	20	Liam Wright		(substituted on) 69'
SH	21	Tate McDermott		(substituted on) 68'
FH	22	Noah Lolesio		(substituted on) 65'
WG	23	Filipo Daugunu		(substituted on) 73'
Coach:
(New Zealand) Dave Rennie

FB	15	Jordie Barrett
RW	14	Sevu Reece
OC	13	Anton Lienert-Brown
IC	12	Ngani Laumape		(substituted off) 65'
LW	11	Rieko Ioane
FH	10	Beauden Barrett
SH	9	TJ Perenara		(substituted off) 77'
N8	8	Ardie Savea
OF	7	Sam Cane (c)		(substituted off) 77'
BF	6	Akira Ioane		(substituted off) 28'
RL	5	Sam Whitelock
LL	4	Scott Barrett	(yellow card) 67' to 77'	(substituted off) 77'
TP	3	Ofa Tu'ungafasi	(red card) 22'
HK	2	Codie Taylor		(substituted off) 69'
LP	1	Karl Tu'inukuafe		(substituted off) 50'
Replacements:
HK	16	Asafo Aumua		(substituted on) 69'
PR	17	Alex Hodgman		(substituted on) 50'
PR	18	Tyrel Lomax		(substituted on) 28'
LK	19	Tupou Vaa'i		(substituted on) 77'
FL	20	Cullen Grace		(substituted on) 77'
SH	21	Brad Weber		(substituted on) 77'
FB	22	Damian McKenzie			(substituted on) 69'
WG	23	Will Jordan		(substituted on) 65'	(substituted off) 69'
Coach:
(New Zealand) Ian Foster

Assistant referees:
Ben O'Keeffe (New Zealand)
Angus Gardner (Australia)
Television match official:
Paul Williams (New Zealand)

Notes:

- James Slipper (Australia) became the thirteenth Wallaby to earn his 100th test cap.
- Angus Bell, Lachlan Swinton and Tom Wright (all Australia) and Asafo Aumua, Cullen Grace, Akira Ioane and Will Jordan (all New Zealand) made their international debut.
- Patrick Tuipulotu was originally named on the bench, but withdrew ahead of kick off and was replaced by Tupou Vaa'i.
- Australia and New Zealand played each other for the fourth time in 2020, the most games between the two nations in one year since the four-test Bledisloe Cup series in 2010.

=== Matchday 3 ===
14 November 2020
17:10 AEDT (UTC+11)

New Zealand	15–25	Argentina
Try: Cane 53' c Clarke 80+1' m Con: Mo'unga (1/2) 54'; Pen: Mo'unga (1/1) 11'	Report	Try: Sánchez 19' c Con: Sánchez (1/1) 20'; Pen: Sánchez (6/7) 5', 26', 33', 48', 57', 77'

Western Sydney Stadium, Sydney
Attendance: 9,063
Referee: Angus Gardner (Australia)

FB	15	Beauden Barrett
RW	14	Jordie Barrett			(substituted off) 49'
OC	13	Anton Lienert-Brown	31' to 40'
IC	12	Jack Goodhue	(substituted off) 63'
LW	11	Caleb Clarke
FH	10	Richie Mo'unga
SH	9	Aaron Smith	(substituted off) 63'
N8	8	Ardie Savea
OF	7	Sam Cane (c)
BF	6	Shannon Frizell	(substituted off) 49'
RL	5	Sam Whitelock
LL	4	Patrick Tuipulotu	(substituted off) 69'
TP	3	Tyrel Lomax	(substituted off) 58'
HK	2	Dane Coles	(substituted off) 49'
LP	1	Joe Moody	(substituted off) 72'
Replacements:
HK	16	Codie Taylor	(substituted on) 49'
PR	17	Alex Hodgman	(substituted on) 72'
PR	18	Nepo Laulala	(substituted on) 58'
LK	19	Tupou Vaa'i	(substituted on) 69'
FL	20	Hoskins Sotutu	(substituted on) 49'
SH	21	Brad Weber	(substituted on) 63'
CE	22	Rieko Ioane	(substituted on) 31'	(substituted off) 40'	(substituted on) 49'
FB	23	Damian McKenzie	(substituted on) 63'
Coach:
(New Zealand) Ian Foster

FB	15	Santiago Carreras	(substituted off) 29'	(substituted on) 40'
RW	14	Bautista Delguy
OC	13	Matías Orlando
IC	12	Santiago Chocobares
LW	11	Juan Imhoff
FH	10	Nicolás Sánchez
SH	9	Tomás Cubelli	(substituted off) 78'
N8	8	Rodrigo Bruni	(substituted off) 55'
OF	7	Marcos Kremer
BF	6	Pablo Matera (c)
RL	5	Matías Alemanno	(substituted off) 72'
LL	4	Guido Petti
TP	3	Francisco Gómez Kodela	(substituted off) 71'
HK	2	Julián Montoya	(substituted off) 78'
LP	1	Nahuel Tetaz Chaparro	(substituted off) 71'
Replacements:
HK	16	Facundo Bosch	(substituted on) 78'
PR	17	Mayco Vivas	(substituted on) 71'
PR	18	Santiago Medrano	(substituted on) 71'
FL	19	Santiago Grondona	(substituted on) 55'
FL	20	Tomás Lezana	(substituted on) 72'
SH	21	Gonzalo Bertranou	(substituted on) 78'
CE	22	Lucio Cinti
WG	23	Santiago Cordero	(substituted on) 29'	(substituted off) 40'
Coach:
(Argentina) Mario Ledesma

Assistant referees:
Nic Berry (Australia)
Paul Williams (New Zealand)
Television match official:
Ben O'Keeffe (New Zealand)

Notes:

- Santiago Chocobares and Santiago Grondona (both Argentina) made their international debuts.
- This was Argentina's first win over New Zealand in 30 attempts.
- This was New Zealand's first loss in Sydney since 2015 when they lost 27–19 to Australia in the 2015 Rugby Championship match at Stadium Australia.
- New Zealand lost back-to-back matches for the first time since 2011.
- Nicolás Sánchez scored the most points for Argentina in a single-match against New Zealand, surpassing Hugo Porta's 21 points in the 21–21 draw at the Estadio Arquitecto Ricardo Etcheverry in 1985.

=== Matchday 4 ===
21 November 2020
19:45 AEDT (UTC+11)

Argentina	15–15	Australia
Pen: Sánchez (5/6) 6', 32', 64', 68', 71'	Report	Pen: Hodge (5/6) 4', 36', 41'+4, 45', 57'

Newcastle International Sports Centre, Newcastle
Attendance: 11,749
Referee: Paul Williams (New Zealand)

FB	15	Santiago Carreras		(substituted off) 59'
RW	14	Bautista Delguy
OC	13	Matías Orlando
IC	12	Santiago Chocobares
LW	11	Juan Imhoff		(substituted off) 15'
FH	10	Nicolás Sánchez
SH	9	Gonzalo Bertranou
N8	8	Rodrigo Bruni		(substituted off) 50'
OF	7	Marcos Kremer			(substituted off) 77'
BF	6	Pablo Matera (c)
RL	5	Matías Alemanno		(substituted off) 64'	(substituted on) 77'
LL	4	Guido Petti
TP	3	Francisco Gómez Kodela		(substituted off) 57'
HK	2	Julián Montoya	(yellow card) 44' to 54'
LP	1	Nahuel Tetaz Chaparro		(substituted off) 41'
Replacements:
HK	16	Santiago Socino		(substituted on) 50'	(substituted off) 57'
PR	17	Mayco Vivas		(substituted on) 41'
PR	18	Santiago Medrano		(substituted on) 57'
FL	19	Santiago Grondona		(substituted on) 64'
N8	20	Facundo Isa			(substituted on) 57'
SH	21	Felipe Ezcurra
FB	22	Emiliano Boffelli		(substituted on) 15'
WG	23	Santiago Cordero		(substituted on) 59'
Coach:
(Argentina) Mario Ledesma

FB	15	Tom Banks
RW	14	Tom Wright	(substituted off) 65'
OC	13	Jordan Petaia
IC	12	Hunter Paisami
LW	11	Marika Koroibete
FH	10	Reece Hodge
SH	9	Nic White	(substituted off) 68'
N8	8	Harry Wilson	(substituted off) 64'
OF	7	Michael Hooper (c)
BF	6	Ned Hanigan
RL	5	Matt Philip
LL	4	Rob Simmons	(substituted off) 68'
TP	3	Taniela Tupou	(substituted off) 40'
HK	2	Brandon Paenga-Amosa	(substituted off) 54'
LP	1	Scott Sio	(substituted off) 64'
Replacements:
HK	16	Folau Fainga'a	(substituted on) 54'
PR	17	Angus Bell	(substituted on) 64'
PR	18	Allan Alaalatoa	(substituted on) 40'
FL	19	Rob Valetini	(substituted on) 64'
FL	20	Liam Wright	(substituted on) 68'
SH	21	Jake Gordon	(substituted on) 68'
FH	22	Noah Lolesio
WG	23	Filipo Daugunu	(substituted on) 65'
Coach:
(New Zealand) Dave Rennie

Assistant referees:
Ben O'Keeffe (New Zealand)
Angus Gardner (Australia)
Television match official:
Nic Berry (Australia)

Notes:

- This is the first drawn match between these two sides since their 19–19 draw in 1987.

=== Matchday 5 ===
28 November 2020
19:45 AEDT (UTC+11)

Argentina	0–38	New Zealand (1 BP)
	Report	Try: Coles 12' c Savea 53' c Jordan (2) 67' c, 70' c Tuipulotu 80+4' c Con: Mo'unga (5/5) 13', 53', 69', 71', 80+5'; Pen: Mo'unga (1/2) 17'

Newcastle International Sports Centre, Newcastle
Attendance: 10,104
Referee: Nic Berry (Australia)

FB	15	Emiliano Boffelli
RW	14	Santiago Cordero
OC	13	Juan Cruz Mallia
IC	12	Jerónimo de la Fuente	(substituted off) 59'
LW	11	Ramiro Moyano
FH	10	Nicolás Sánchez	(substituted off) 62'
SH	9	Felipe Ezcurra	(substituted off) 66'
N8	8	Facundo Isa
OF	7	Marcos Kremer	(substituted off) 60'
BF	6	Pablo Matera (c)
RL	5	Lucas Paulos	(substituted off) 59'
LL	4	Guido Petti
TP	3	Santiago Medrano	(substituted off) 55'	(substituted on) 80+1'
HK	2	Julián Montoya	(substituted off) 66'
LP	1	Mayco Vivas	(substituted off) 55'
Replacements:
HK	16	Santiago Socino	(substituted on) 66'
PR	17	Nahuel Tetaz Chaparro	(substituted on) 55'
PR	18	Lucio Sordoni	(substituted on) 55'	(substituted off) 80+1'
FL	19	Matías Alemanno	(substituted on) 59'
FL	20	Santiago Grondona	(substituted on) 60'
SH	21	Gonzalo Bertranou	(substituted on) 66'
FB	22	Santiago Carreras	(substituted on) 62'
CE	23	Lucas Mensa	(substituted on) 59'
Coach:
(Argentina) Mario Ledesma

FB	15	Beauden Barrett
RW	14	Jordie Barrett
OC	13	Anton Lienert-Brown		(substituted off) 54'
IC	12	Jack Goodhue
LW	11	Caleb Clarke		(substituted off) 64'
FH	10	Richie Mo'unga
SH	9	Aaron Smith		(substituted off) 59'
N8	8	Ardie Savea
OF	7	Sam Cane (c)
BF	6	Akira Ioane		(substituted off) 64'
RL	5	Sam Whitelock		(substituted off) 62'
LL	4	Scott Barrett
TP	3	Nepo Laulala		(substituted off) 56'
HK	2	Dane Coles		(substituted off) 59'
LP	1	Joe Moody		(substituted off) 56'
Replacements:
HK	16	Codie Taylor		(substituted on) 59'
PR	17	Karl Tu'inukuafe		(substituted on) 56'
PR	18	Tyrel Lomax	(yellow card) 80' to end'	(substituted on) 56'
LK	19	Patrick Tuipulotu		(substituted on) 62'
FL	20	Hoskins Sotutu		(substituted on) 64'
SH	21	TJ Perenara		(substituted on) 59'
CE	22	Rieko Ioane		(substituted on) 54'
FB	23	Will Jordan		(substituted on) 64'
Coach:
(New Zealand) Ian Foster

Assistant referees:
Angus Gardner (Australia)
Ben O'Keeffe (New Zealand)
Television match official:
Paul Williams (New Zealand)

Notes:

- Lucas Paulos (Argentina) made his international debut.
- Joe Moody (New Zealand) earned his 50th test cap.
- New Zealand kept Argentina scoreless for the first time.

=== Matchday 6 ===
5 December 2020
19:45 AEDT (UTC+11)

Australia	16–16	Argentina
Try: Hooper 67' c Con: Hodge (1/1) 68'; Pen: Hodge (3/4) 16', 41+2', 51'	Report	Try: Delguy 34' c Con: Miotti (1/1) 36'; Pen: Sánchez (1/1) 18'; Miotti (2/2) 30', 61'

Western Sydney Stadium, Sydney
Attendance: 10,000
Referee: Angus Gardner (Australia)

FB	15	Reece Hodge
RW	14	Tom Wright
OC	13	Jordan Petaia		(substituted off) 74'
IC	12	Hunter Paisami
LW	11	Marika Koroibete		(substituted off) 72'
FH	10	James O'Connor
SH	9	Nic White		(substituted off) 70'
N8	8	Harry Wilson		(substituted off) 40'
OF	7	Michael Hooper (c)	(yellow card) 28' to 38'
BF	6	Ned Hanigan
RL	5	Matt Philip
LL	4	Rob Simmons		(substituted off) 51'
TP	3	Allan Alaalatoa		(substituted off) 51'
HK	2	Brandon Paenga-Amosa		(substituted off) 56'
LP	1	Scott Sio		(substituted off) 59'
Replacements:
HK	16	Folau Fainga'a		(substituted on) 56'
PR	17	Angus Bell		(substituted on) 59'
PR	18	Taniela Tupou		(substituted on) 51'
LK	19	Lukhan Salakaia-Loto	(red card) 59'	(substituted on) 51'
FL	20	Rob Valetini		(substituted on) 40'
SH	21	Jake Gordon		(substituted on) 70'
CE	22	Irae Simone		(substituted on) 74'
WG	23	Tom Banks		(substituted on) 72'
Coach:
(New Zealand) Dave Rennie

FB	15	Santiago Carreras
RW	14	Bautista Delguy
OC	13	Matías Orlando
IC	12	Jerónimo de la Fuente (c)
LW	11	Emiliano Boffelli
FH	10	Nicolás Sánchez		(substituted off) 28'	(substituted on) 39'	(substituted off) 56'
SH	9	Felipe Ezcurra		(substituted off) 73'
N8	8	Rodrigo Bruni		(substituted off) 56'
OF	7	Facundo Isa
BF	6	Santiago Grondona		(substituted off) 59'
RL	5	Marcos Kremer	(yellow card) 15' to 25'
LL	4	Matías Alemanno
TP	3	Francisco Gómez Kodela		(substituted off) 68'
HK	2	Julián Montoya
LP	1	Nahuel Tetaz Chaparro		(substituted off) 64'
Replacements:
HK	16	José Luis González
PR	17	Mayco Vivas		(substituted on) 64'
PR	18	Juan Pablo Zeiss		(substituted on) 68'
LK	19	Lucas Paulos	(yellow card) 65' to 75'	(substituted on) 59'
FL	20	Francisco Gorrissen		(substituted on) 56'
SH	21	Gonzalo Bertranou		(substituted on) 73'
FB	22	Domingo Miotti		(substituted on) 28'	(substituted off) 39'	(substituted on) 56'
CE	23	Santiago Chocobares
Coach:
(Argentina) Mario Ledesma

Assistant referees:
Nic Berry (Australia)
Jordan Way (Australia)
Television match official:
Damon Murphy (Australia)

Notes:

- Francisco Gorrissen and Domingo Miotti (Argentina) made their international debuts.
- Argentina and Australia drew back-to-matches for the first time.
- Australia retained the Puma Trophy.

== Participants ==
Team	Head coach	Captain	World Rugby Rankings	
Team	Head coach	Captain	Start (Note: As of 26 October 2020.)	End (Note: As of 7 December 2020.)
Argentina	Mario Ledesma	Pablo Matera	10th	8th
Argentina	Mario Ledesma	Jerónimo de la Fuente	10th	8th
Australia	Dave Rennie	Michael Hooper	6th	6th
New Zealand	Ian Foster	Sam Cane	2nd	3rd

=== Squads ===
Note: Ages, caps and clubs/franchises are of 31 October 2020.

==== Argentina ====
On 2 October 2020 Argentina named a 45-man roster for the Rugby Championship.

Note: Flags indicate national union for the club/province as defined by World Rugby.

Player	Position	Date of birth (age)	Caps	Club/province
Facundo Bosch	Hooker	8 August 1991 (aged 29)	1	(France) La Rochelle
José Luis González	Hooker	11 September 1997 (aged 23)	0	(Argentina) Ceibos
Julián Montoya	Hooker	29 October 1993 (aged 27)	59	(Argentina) Jaguares
Santiago Socino	Hooker	7 May 1992 (aged 28)	2	(Argentina) Jaguares
Nahuel Tetaz Chaparro	Prop	11 June 1989 (aged 31)	58	(Argentina) Jaguares
Santiago Medrano	Prop	6 May 1996 (aged 24)	18	(Argentina) Jaguares
Mayco Vivas	Prop	2 June 1998 (aged 22)	8	(Argentina) Jaguares
Federico Wegrzyn	Prop	8 January 1998 (aged 22)	0	(Argentina) Ceibos
Ignacio Calles	Prop	10 October 1994 (aged 26)	0	(France) Pau
Francisco Gómez Kodela	Prop	7 July 1985 (aged 35)	11	(France) Lyon
Lucio Sordoni	Prop	23 July 1998 (aged 22)	2	(Argentina) Jaguares
Juan Pablo Zeiss	Prop	2 August 1989 (aged 31)	4	(Argentina) Jaguares
Matías Alemanno	Lock	5 December 1991 (aged 28)	61	(England) Gloucester
Ignacio Calas	Lock	18 March 1996 (aged 24)	0	(Argentina) Jaguares
Rodrigo Fernández Criado	Lock	18 March 1998 (aged 22)	0	(Argentina) Ceibos
Lucas Paulos	Lock	9 January 1998 (aged 22)	0	(Argentina) Jaguares
Guido Petti	Lock	17 November 1994 (aged 25)	53	(France) Bordeaux Bègles
Rodrigo Bruni	Back row	3 September 1993 (aged 27)	4	(Argentina) Jaguares
Juan Martín González	Back row	14 November 2000 (aged 19)	0	(Canada) Toronto Arrows
Francisco Gorrissen	Back row	30 August 1994 (aged 26)	0	(Argentina) Jaguares
Santiago Grondona	Back row	25 July 1998 (aged 22)	0	(Argentina) Jaguares
Facundo Isa	Back row	21 September 1993 (aged 27)	27	(France) Toulon
Marcos Kremer	Back row	30 July 1997 (aged 23)	28	(France) Stade Français
Tomás Lezana	Back row	16 February 1994 (aged 26)	38	(Argentina) Jaguares
Pablo Matera (c)	Back row	18 July 1993 (aged 27)	66	(France) Stade Français
Joaquín Oviedo	Back row	17 July 2001 (aged 19)	0	(Argentina) Córdoba Athletic
Gonzalo Bertranou	Scrum-half	31 December 1993 (aged 26)	22	(Argentina) Jaguares
Tomás Cubelli	Scrum-half	12 June 1989 (aged 31)	75	(Argentina) Jaguares
Felipe Ezcurra	Scrum-half	15 May 1993 (aged 27)	8	(Argentina) Jaguares
Tomás Albornoz	Fly-half	17 September 1997 (aged 23)	0	(Argentina) Jaguares
Domingo Miotti	Fly-half	22 May 1996 (aged 24)	2	(Argentina) Jaguares
Nicolás Sánchez	Fly-half	26 October 1988 (aged 32)	80	(France) Stade Français
Santiago Chocobares	Centre	March 31, 1999 (aged 21)	0	(Argentina) Jaguares
Lucio Cinti	Centre	23 February 2000 (aged 20)	0	Argentina Sevens
Jerónimo de la Fuente	Centre	24 February 1991 (aged 29)	54	(France) Perpignan
Juan Cruz Mallia	Centre	11 September 1996 (aged 24)	5	(Argentina) Jaguares
Lucas Mensa	Centre	24 May 1996 (aged 24)	2	(France) Valence Romans
Matías Moroni	Centre	29 March 1991 (aged 29)	47	(England) Leicester Tigers
Matías Orlando	Centre	14 November 1991 (aged 28)	44	(England) Newcastle Falcons
Sebastián Cancelliere	Wing	17 September 1993 (aged 27)	5	(Argentina) Jaguares
Santiago Cordero	Wing	6 December 1993 (aged 26)	35	(France) Bordeaux Bègles
Bautista Delguy	Wing	22 April 1997 (aged 23)	14	(Argentina) Jaguares
Juan Imhoff	Wing	11 May 1988 (aged 32)	33	(France) Racing 92
Ramiro Moyano	Wing	28 May 1990 (aged 30)	35	(France) Toulon
Emiliano Boffelli	Fullback	16 January 1995 (aged 25)	28	(Argentina) Jaguares
Santiago Carreras	Fullback	30 March 1998 (aged 22)	5	(Argentina) Jaguares

==== Australia ====
The Wallabies squad for the 2020 Rugby Championship was announced on 13 September 2020.

Player	Position	Date of birth (age)	Caps	Club/province
Folau Fainga'a	Hooker	5 May 1995 (aged 25)	13	Brumbies
Connal McInerney	Hooker	2 March 1995 (aged 25)	0	Brumbies
Brandon Paenga-Amosa	Hooker	25 December 1995 (aged 24)	5	Reds
Jordan Uelese	Hooker	24 January 1997 (aged 23)	11	Rebels
Jermaine Ainsley	Prop	8 August 1995 (aged 25)	3	Rebels
Allan Alaalatoa	Prop	28 January 1994 (aged 26)	37	Brumbies
Angus Bell	Prop	10 April 2000 (aged 20)	0	Waratahs
Pone Fa'amausili	Prop	26 February 1997 (aged 23)	0	Rebels
Harry Johnson-Holmes	Prop	2 March 1997 (aged 23)	1	Waratahs
Scott Sio	Prop	16 October 1991 (aged 29)	65	Brumbies
James Slipper	Prop	6 June 1989 (aged 31)	98	Brumbies
Taniela Tupou	Prop	10 May 1996 (aged 24)	21	Reds
Ned Hanigan	Lock	11 April 1995 (aged 25)	21	Waratahs
Trevor Hosea	Lock	24 November 1999 (aged 20)	0	Rebels
Matt Philip	Lock	7 March 1994 (aged 26)	5	Rebels
Lukhan Salakaia-Loto	Lock	19 September 1996 (aged 24)	23	Reds
Rob Simmons	Lock	19 April 1989 (aged 31)	102	Waratahs
Michael Hooper (c)	Back row	29 October 1991 (aged 29)	101	Waratahs
Fraser McReight	Back row	19 February 1999 (aged 21)	0	Reds
Isi Naisarani	Back row	14 February 1995 (aged 25)	8	Rebels
Pete Samu	Back row	17 December 1991 (aged 28)	10	Brumbies
Lachlan Swinton	Back row	16 January 1997 (aged 23)	0	Waratahs
Rob Valetini	Back row	3 September 1998 (aged 22)	2	Brumbies
Harry Wilson	Back row	22 November 1999 (aged 20)	2	Reds
Liam Wright	Back row	6 November 1997 (aged 22)	3	Reds
Jake Gordon	Scrum-half	7 June 1993 (aged 27)	3	Waratahs
Tate McDermott	Scrum-half	18 September 1998 (aged 22)	0	Reds
Joe Powell	Scrum-half	11 April 1994 (aged 26)	4	Brumbies
Nic White	Scrum-half	13 June 1990 (aged 30)	33	Brumbies
Will Harrison	Fly-half	30 July 1999 (aged 21)	0	Waratahs
Noah Lolesio	Fly-half	18 December 1999 (aged 20)	0	Brumbies
James O'Connor	Fly-half	5 July 1990 (aged 30)	54	Reds
Reece Hodge	Centre	26 August 1994 (aged 26)	41	Rebels
Len Ikitau	Centre	1 October 1998 (aged 22)	0	Brumbies
Hunter Paisami	Centre	10 April 1998 (aged 22)	2	Reds
Jordan Petaia	Centre	14 March 2000 (aged 20)	4	Reds
Irae Simone	Centre	10 July 1995 (aged 25)	0	Brumbies
Filipo Daugunu	Wing	3 April 1995 (aged 25)	2	Reds
Marika Koroibete	Wing	26 July 1992 (aged 28)	30	Rebels
James Ramm	Wing	30 April 1998 (aged 22)	0	Waratahs
Tom Wright	Wing	21 July 1997 (aged 23)	0	Brumbies
Tom Banks	Fullback	18 June 1994 (aged 26)	8	Brumbies
Dane Haylett-Petty	Fullback	18 June 1989 (aged 31)	37	Rebels
Jack Maddocks	Fullback	5 February 1997 (aged 23)	7	Waratahs

==== New Zealand ====
All Blacks 38-man traveling squad for the 2020 Tri Nations Series.

Player	Position	Date of birth (age)	Caps	Franchise/province
Asafo Aumua	Hooker	5 March 1997 (aged 23)	0	Hurricanes / Wellington
Dane Coles	Hooker	10 December 1986 (aged 33)	71	Hurricanes / Wellington
Codie Taylor	Hooker	31 March 1991 (aged 29)	52	Crusaders / Canterbury
George Bower	Prop	28 May 1992 (aged 28)	0	Crusaders / Otago
Alex Hodgman	Prop	16 July 1993 (aged 27)	1	Blues / Auckland
Nepo Laulala	Prop	6 November 1991 (aged 28)	27	Chiefs / Counties Manukau
Tyrel Lomax	Prop	16 March 1996 (aged 24)	2	Hurricanes / Tasman
Joe Moody	Prop	18 September 1988 (aged 32)	48	Crusaders / Canterbury
Karl Tu'inukuafe	Prop	21 February 1993 (aged 27)	14	Blues / North Harbour
Ofa Tu'ungafasi	Prop	19 April 1992 (aged 28)	37	Blues / Auckland
Scott Barrett	Lock	20 November 1993 (aged 25)	37	Crusaders
Mitchell Dunshea	Lock	18 November 1995 (aged 24)	0	Crusaders / Canterbury
Patrick Tuipulotu	Lock	23 January 1993 (aged 27)	32	Blues / Auckland
Tupou Vaa'i	Lock	27 January 2000 (aged 20)	2	Chiefs / Taranaki
Sam Whitelock	Lock	12 October 1988 (aged 32)	118	Crusaders / Canterbury
Sam Cane (c)	Loose forward	13 January 1992 (aged 28)	70	Chiefs / Bay of Plenty
Shannon Frizell	Loose forward	11 February 1994 (aged 26)	11	Highlanders / Tasman
Cullen Grace	Loose forward	20 December 1999 (aged 20)	0	Crusaders / Canterbury
Akira Ioane	Loose forward	16 June 1995 (aged 25)	0	Blues / Auckland
Du'Plessis Kirifi	Loose forward	3 March 1997 (aged 23)	0	Hurricanes / Wellington
Dalton Papalii	Loose forward	11 October 1997 (aged 23)	3	Blues / Auckland
Ardie Savea	Loose forward	14 October 1993 (aged 27)	46	Hurricanes / Wellington
Hoskins Sotutu	Loose forward	12 July 1998 (aged 22)	2	Blues / Auckland
TJ Perenara	Half-back	23 January 1992 (aged 28)	66	Hurricanes / Wellington
Aaron Smith	Half-back	21 November 1988 (aged 31)	94	Highlanders / Manawatu
Brad Weber	Half-back	17 January 1991 (aged 29)	5	Chiefs / Hawke's Bay
Beauden Barrett	First five-eighth	27 May 1991 (aged 29)	85	Blues / Taranaki
Richie Mo'unga	First five-eighth	25 May 1994 (aged 26)	19	Crusaders / Canterbury
Jack Goodhue	Centre	13 June 1995 (aged 25)	15	Crusaders / Northland
Rieko Ioane	Centre	18 March 1997 (aged 23)	31	Blues / Auckland
Ngani Laumape	Centre	22 April 1993 (aged 27)	13	Hurricanes / Manawatu
Anton Lienert-Brown	Centre	15 April 1995 (aged 25)	45	Chiefs / Waikato
Peter Umaga-Jensen	Centre	31 December 1997 (aged 22)	1	Hurricanes / Wellington
Caleb Clarke	Wing	29 March 1999 (aged 21)	2	Blues / Auckland
Sevu Reece	Wing	13 February 1997 (aged 23)	7	Crusaders / Waikato
Jordie Barrett	Fullback	17 February 1997 (aged 23)	19	Hurricanes / Taranaki
Will Jordan	Fullback	24 February 1998 (aged 22)	0	Crusaders / Tasman
Damian McKenzie	Fullback	20 May 1995 (aged 25)	25	Chiefs / Waikato

== See also ==
- History of rugby union matches between Argentina and Australia
- History of rugby union matches between Argentina and New Zealand
- History of rugby union matches between Australia and New Zealand
- Bledisloe Cup
- Puma Trophy
- 2020 end-of-year rugby union internationals
