= Tom Wright (rugby, born 1997) =

Australian rugby union & rugby league footballer

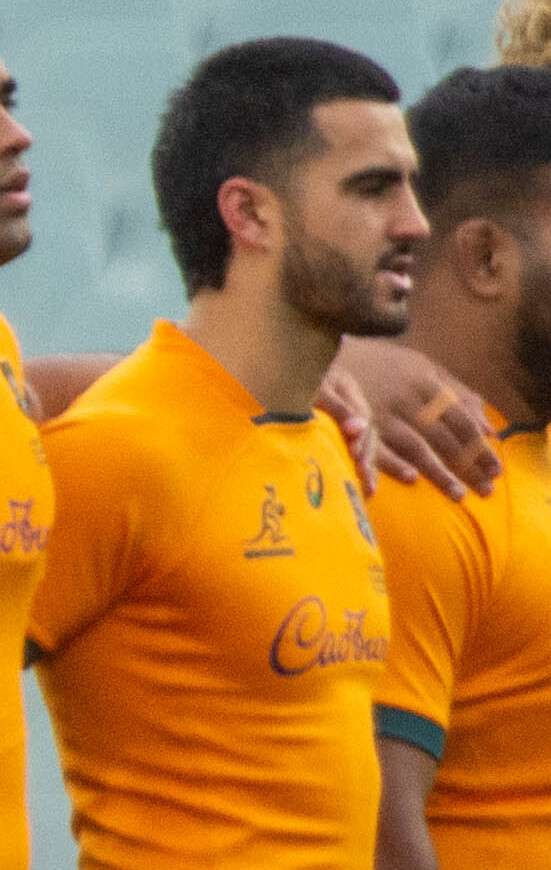
- Wright with Australia in 2022

Personal information
- Full name: Thomas Wright
- Born: 21 July 1997 (age 29) Randwick, New South Wales, Australia
- Height: 1.86 m (6 ft 1 in)
- Weight: 96 kg (212 lb; 15 st 2 lb)

Playing information

Rugby league
- Position: Five-eighth, Fullback
Club
Years	Team	Pld	T	G	FG	P
2018	Manly Sea Eagles	5	1	0	0	4

Rugby union
- Position: Fullback, Wing, Centre
Club
Years	Team	Pld	T	G	FG	P
2019–	Brumbies	104	41	0	0	205
2019–2020	Canberra Vikings	8	7	0	0	35
	Total	112	48	0	0	240
Representative
Years	Team	Pld	T	G	FG	P
2020–	Australia	53	16	0	0	80
- Source: As of 17 October 2026

Thomas Wright (born 21 July 1997) is an Australian professional dual-code rugby footballer who plays as a fullback for Super Rugby club the ACT Brumbies and the Australia national team. Wright previously played rugby league as a five-eighth for the Manly Warringah Sea Eagles in the National Rugby League (NRL). He made his Australia international rugby union debut against in the Bledisloe Cup match against New Zealand in the second round of the 2020 Tri Nations Series. Wright scored a try with his first touch of the ball in the match, and Australia defeated New Zealand 24–22.

== Early life and background ==
Thomas Wright was born in Randwick, in the Eastern Suburbs of Sydney, New South Wales, Australia in 1997. In his youth he played rugby league for the Clovelly Crocodiles and La Perouse Panthers as well as rugby union for the Clovelly Eagles Junior Rugby Club, where he was their record try-scorer. In 2009, Wright began his education at St Joseph's College, Hunters Hill where he eventually advanced into the schools 1st XV.

In his final year at school (2014), Wright represented St Joseph's while being selected in both the GPS 1st XV and the New South Wales 1st XV. The following year (2015), Wright played in the National Youth Sevens Championship where he was named Player of the Tournament. He was later selected in the Australian Boy's Sevens team, ahead of the 2015 Commonwealth Youth Games held in Apia, Samoa. Before the competition was held, however, Wright signed for the Manly Warringah Sea Eagles in the National Rugby League. The team went on to win a silver medal against South Africa which included future Springboks Damian Willemse and Manie Libbok.

During his school rugby tenure, Wright mostly played as an outside centre (No. 13) but also operated as a fly-half and an outside back. In 2015 Wright ruptured his anterior cruciate ligament. Despite his injury, Australian sports blog, Green and Gold Rugby, named him as their left wing (No. 11) in the "GPS Team of the Year".

== Rugby league career ==
In August 2015, the Manly Warringah Sea Eagles of the National Rugby League (NRL) signed Wright on a three-year deal. Throughout 2016 Wright played with the Under-20s team in the NRL's National Youth Competition (NYC), also known as the Holden Cup. In 2017 Wright played as the Sea Eagles' NYC five-eighth throughout their 2017 Premiership-winning season. The team, who finished wooden-spooners the previous season, managed to scrape into the finals series point difference. The Sea Eagles NYC team successfully made the Grand Final and defeated the Parramatta Eels NYC 20–18. In total, Wright played 36 games for the Sea Eagles' NYC team over the two years.

Throughout March and April 2018, Wright played eight games for the Blacktown Workers (Manly Warringah Sea Eagles reserves) in the NSW Cup, scoring four tries in the process. On 12 May 2018, Wright made his NRL debut for the Sea Eagles in their 38–24 victory against the Brisbane Broncos at Lang Park, Brisbane. Wright only made another three appearances for the team throughout the rest of the 2018 NRL season, with the majority of his season being played for the Blacktown Workers in the NSW Cup. By the end of the season, Wright had requested a release from his contract.

== Rugby union career ==
=== ACT Brumbies ===
==== 2019–2020 ====
In September 2018, The Sydney Morning Herald reported that Wright had signed a two-year deal with the Canberra-based Brumbies in the Super Rugby. Wright was named as one of many new signings for the club, for which The Sydney Morning Herald described as an "out of the box recruitment strategy". Wright was reportedly coming out of contract with the Manly Warringah Sea Eagles when he was contacted by Brumbies coach Dan McKellar. Talking to Rugby.com.au, Wright stated of the talks: "We started talking about how they want to play and that game plan would ideally suit how I like to play and best – using the ball, an open style of footy. Which is how Australian rugby is starting to play again now, which is really exciting... It's an open brand of footy, playing what's in front of them. So when the opportunity came about to come back to rugby union, I am 21 now and I didn't want to let that opportunity slip to be completely honest." Coach Dan McKellar said that he had been aware of Wright's presence, and spoke approvingly of his skills, stating: "We've been aware of Tom's rugby union background and heard he was interested in coming back to the game. He's got X-factor and there's definitely potential there. He's creative, good footwork, good speed and good acceleration. He can create something out of nothing. He's got a good short kicking game and that comes off the back of a couple of games in rugby league. And he's not afraid to take the ball to the line, he's brave enough to dig in and they're good qualities to have."

On 23 February 2019, Wright made his professional rugby union debut for the Brumbies in Round 2 of the 2019 Super Rugby season against the Chiefs. Wright came on as a substitute in the 70th minute for fullback Tom Banks. The Brumbies won the match at home, 54–17. In the following round, Wright, whom again, came off the bench for fullback Tom Banks, scored his first try for the Brumbies in a 30-point loss to the Hurricanes in Palmerston North. Despite it being Wright's debut year, he showcased his most versatile season to date by playing across four different positions on the field (fullback, right wing, left wing, inside centre), also highlighting the tight competition between the Brumbies' backline positions.

In 2020, Wright played in five of the six opening Brumbies' matches. However, due to the COVID-19 pandemic, the season was cancelled. Wright would go on to play in eight of the Brumbies' nine matches in the revamped Super Rugby AU. The Brumbies finished the season top of the ladder. Wright started on the left wing in the Brumbies' home Grand Final victory against the Queensland Reds. Wright finished the season the second-highest try scorer, behind Filipo Daugunu. In the middle of the year, there was speculation Wright may go back to rugby league after Rugby Australia froze all contract negotiations with Super Rugby players due to financial uncertainty. In August, however, it was reported that Wright had re-signed with the Brumbies for the following season, which allowed him to make his international debut for Australia months later in the 2020 Tri Nations Series.

==== 2021–2022 ====
Wright missed the first six rounds of the 2021 Super Rugby AU season after suffering bone bruising on his knee during pre-season training. Wright returned to the first-team squad against rivals the New South Wales Waratahs in Round 7. Starting on the right wing, Wright scored one try for the team, which proved to be vital, as the Brumbies won 22–24. Wright scored a further three tries in his next three appearances for the Brumbies, all coming from the left wing. Overall, Wright featured in ten of the Brumbies' 2021 fixtures across the Super Rugby AU and Super Rugby Trans-Tasman.

The 2022 season marked another pivotal transition in Wright's career, as he was formally repositioned to starting fullback for both club and country. Over the course of the season, he featured in nineteen matches on the right wing, one on the left wing, and four at fullback (due to injured teammate Tom Banks) — a notable shift from the previous year, during which he spent the majority of his time on the left wing. This strategic realignment coincided with a standout year for Wright, who finished as the leading Australian try-scorer in the inaugural Super Rugby Pacific competition. It was also his most industrious season to date, with Wright appearing in sixteen matches, only two of which saw him substituted. The Brumbies finished fourth on the ladder, the highest-placed Australian side, securing a quarter-final victory over the Hurricanes before suffering a narrow one-point defeat to the Blues in a tightly contested semi-final.

==== 2023–2024 ====
In 2023, Tom Wright, entering his fifth season with the Brumbies, transitioned permanently into the fullback role under new coach Stephen Larkham, a move seen as inevitable. The departure of key backs Irae Simone and Tom Banks created a vacancy, while the high-profile signing of Australia sevens standout Corey Toole added further impetus for the reshuffle. Wright featured in 14 of the Brumbies' 16 matches, including both finals appearances, anchoring the backfield with consistency. Notably, his attacking output dipped compared to previous seasons, registering just three tries over the course of the campaign. Ahead of Round 3, The Canberra Times and The Sydney Morning Herald underscored the significance of Wright's positional shift by framing the Brumbies' clash with the Queensland Reds as a de facto audition for the Wallabies' fullback jersey, pitting Wright against the Reds' Jordan Petaia in a high-stakes early season litmus test.

In 2024, Wright solidified his status as a cornerstone of the Brumbies' backline, featuring in all 16 matches of the season and being substituted only once. He concluded the campaign as the leading Australian try-scorer with 10 tries, among the top five in the competition, and was lauded by RugbyPass as "one of the very best counter-attacking and broken-field runners in Super Rugby Pacific." Wright's impact extended well beyond the scoreboard. He ranked fourth in total carries (trailing only teammate Rob Valetini) and led the entire competition in metres run, finishing over 100 metres ahead of his nearest rival, the Chiefs' Etene Nanai-Seturo. He also placed fourth in defenders beaten, underscoring his potency with ball in hand and his ability to consistently challenge defensive structures. Building on his emergence in 2023 as a secondary playmaker, Wright's influence within the Brumbies' attacking framework deepened in 2024. He became a pivotal figure in orchestrating second- and third-phase movements, seamlessly combining with left-edge partner Corey Toole to form a lethal counter-attacking tandem.

==== 2025–2026 ====
In 2025, Wright started at fullback for the Brumbies in fifteen of their sixteen matches, totaling 1,197 minutes played. Despite having a lesser involvement on the scoresheet than previous seasons, having scored just two tries all season, Wright led the team in try assists (9), metres carried (1,314), and defenders beaten (59), while ranking among the team's highest in ball carries (180), and line breaks (19). At the end of the regular season, the Brumbies had finished third on the ladder, the highest position of any Australian team. Wright had also received 17 Player of the Year votes, the fourth highest in the team behind Tom Hooper, Rob Valetini, and Allan Alaalatoa. In the Brumbies' opening match of the finals, Wright scored his second try of the season against the Hurricanes at home. The Brumbies won in a close game 35–28, being the only Australian team to advance past the qualifying finals. The Brumbies lost the following match to the Chiefs in Hamilton.

After sustaining a serious ACL injury in Australia's second Test against South Africa in 2025, Wright missed the first half of the 2026 season for the Brumbies. He was named the starting fullback in their round ten match against the Fijian Drua at home after returning from rehab "ahead of schedule" according to coach Stephen Larkham. In his first game back, Wright played 64 minutes, being subbed off for Andy Muirhead, who had covered fullback during Wright's absence. Overall, he made seven appearances for the Brumbies during the 2026 season, returning to starting fullback in a campaign that saw the side finish sixth on the regular season ladder. Across his seven matches, the Brumbies recorded two victories and five defeats. Logging 540 minutes of game time, Wright carried for 441 metres, beating 21 defenders, and scoring one try. He also completed 79 passes at an 89% success rate, registering three try assists, and recording 164 touches. Defensively Wright contributed 13 tackles, averaging 1.86 per match.

== International career ==
In September 2020, Wright was named in Australia coach Dave Rennie's 44-player squad ahead of their opening fixture against New Zealand in the 2020 Tri Nations Series. Wright made his international debut for Australia on 7 November 2020. Wallaby #939, Wright was named on the right wing. After just two minutes into the match, Wright scored a try with his first touch of the ball at Lang Park, Brisbane. Australia won the match 24–22. Wright played in another two fixtures of the 2020 Tri Nations Series.

Wright was among eleven Brumbies players to be called-up to the Wallabies for the 2021 France tour of Australia. Playing in the first two tests, Wright was selected again in the final round of the 2021 Rugby Championship against Argentina and the end-of-year Spring tour. Wright's impact on the Wallabies throughout 2021 was underwhelming, scoring just one try from seven matches. Australian sports news website The Roar gave him a rating of 4.5 out of 10 for his international performances in 2021.

Wright was selected in the Wallabies' 35-man squad for England's 2022 tour of Australia. He featured in the first two Tests on the right wing, crossing the try line in the second match at the Sydney Cricket Ground. Despite his contributions, Australia ultimately fell short, losing the series 2–1. Since 2021, there had been growing speculation around Wright's potential to fill the fullback role for the national side. This conjecture materialised in the opening round of the 2022 Rugby Championship, where a series of injuries prompted a reshuffle that saw Wright named at fullback against Argentina at Estadio Malvinas Argentinas, Mendoza. However, by the third round, he had returned to the right wing, with Reece Hodge assuming fullback duties. During the Spring Tour later that year, Wright transitioned to the left wing, though he would feature once more at fullback before the year concluded.

In 2023, Wright made only two international appearances for the Wallabies in the lead-up to the Rugby World Cup (RWC). Despite having received high praise from head coach Eddie Jones earlier in the year, who remarked that: "Tom has the ability to be the world's best fullback", Wright was ultimately omitted from the final Rugby World Cup squad announced in August. In his absence, Ben Donaldson and Andrew Kellaway were entrusted with fullback duties during the tournament. The Wallabies' campaign, however, ended in disappointment, as they failed to progress beyond the pool stage, a historic low for the team. Reflecting on Wright's exclusion, former Wallabies forward Stephen Hoiles expressed his disbelief on the Between Two Posts podcast, stating: "There was so much going on during the World Cup last year, and there was a Barbarians squad. I remember seeing a photo of the Barbarians and just looking, going, ‘Hang on. Why is Tom Wright not in the Wallabies, like six weeks after it was named? He's only ever been good for every team he's played in.'" Wright would later score a try for Australia A in their 2023 Rugby World Cup warm-up match against Portugal. Australia A won 30–17 in Massy, France.

Wright was recalled to the national squad in June 2024 ahead of Australia's two-Test series against Wales during their tour of Australia. He made an immediate impact, scoring a try in the opening Test, a 25–16 victory for the Wallabies. Reinstated as the first-choice fullback, Wright went on to feature in all but one fixture during Australia's 2024 international campaign. His most commanding performance came during Australia's Grand Slam tour, where he recorded his first international hat-trick in a dominant victory over Wales.

Wright featured in all three of Australia's Tests against the British & Irish Lions on their 2025 tour of Australia, delivering consistently composed performances across the series. His tactical kicking and defensive coverage drew praise from The Guardian, which lauded his composure under pressure and positional intelligence. Notably, The Guardian also awarded Wright the "Try of the Series" for his decisive score in the second Test, a clinical finish started by Joseph Sua'ali'i that extended Australia's lead to 23–5. Australia lost the series 1–2. Wright scored his twelfth international try against South Africa in the opening round of the 2025 Rugby Championship. Australia won 22–38, having been 22–0 down after 20 minutes. In Australia's second test against South Africa, Wright suffered an ACL injury, and was ruled out for the rest of the year.

Wright returned to Test rugby in July 2026, being named in Australia's first Test match of the year, against Ireland in the Southern Hemisphere Series of the 2026 Nations Championship on home soil. Wright came on late in the game as a substitute, playing just a handful of minutes as Australia lost by two points. In Australia's following Test, Wright was sin binned in the 50th minute against France, playing 70 minutes total in a 16-point loss. In Australia's third and final Test of the Southern Hemisphere Series, Wright scored his first international try in 336 days as the Wallabies defeated Italy 57–10, their first Test win in seven matches. Wright followed this try with a second for the year in Australia's first Test against Japan in the Australia–Japan Test Series in Osaka.

== Career statistics ==
=== Club ===
As of 6 November 2026.

Statistics by club, season and competition
Club	Season	League			
Club	Season	Division	Apps	Tries	Points
Canberra Vikings	2019	National Rugby Championship	8	7	35
Brumbies	2019	Super Rugby	13	3	15
Brumbies	2020	Super Rugby	5	4	20
Brumbies	2020	Super Rugby AU	8	5	25
Brumbies	2021	Super Rugby AU	5	4	20
Brumbies	2021	Super Rugby Trans-Tasman	5	0	0
Brumbies	2022	Super Rugby Pacific	16	9	45
Brumbies	2023	Super Rugby Pacific	14	3	15
Brumbies	2024	Super Rugby Pacific	16	10	50
Brumbies	2025	Super Rugby Pacific	15	2	10
Brumbies	2026	Super Rugby Pacific	7	1	5
Brumbies	Total		104	41	205
Career total			112	48	240

=== International ===
As of 6 November 2026.

Statistics by team and year
Team	Year	Statistic		
Team	Year	Apps	Tries	Points
Australia A	2023	1	1	5
Australia	2020	3	1	5
Australia	2021	7	1	5
Australia	2022	13	2	10
Australia	2023	2	0	0
Australia	2024	12	6	30
Australia	2025	6	2	10
Australia	2026	10	4	20
Total		53	16	80

=== International tries ===
List of international tries scored by Tom Wright
No.	Opponent	Location	Competition	Date	Result	Ref.
1	New Zealand	Lang Park, Brisbane	2020 Tri Nations Series	7 November 2020	24–22	
2	Japan	Showa Denko Dome Oita, Ōita	2021 Autumn Internationals	23 October 2021	23–32	
3	England	Sydney Cricket Ground, Sydney	2022 England tour of Australia	16 July 2022	17–21	
4	Italy	Stadio Artemio Franchi, Florence	2022 Autumn Internationals	12 November 2022	28–27	
5	Wales	Sydney Football Stadium, Sydney	2024 Wales tour of Australia	6 July 2024	25–16	
6	New Zealand	Stadium Australia, Sydney	2024 Rugby Championship	21 September 2024	28–31	
7	England	Twickenham Stadium, London	2024 Autumn Internationals	9 November 2024	37–42	
8	Wales	Millennium Stadium, Cardiff	2024 Autumn Internationals	17 November 2024	20–52	
9	Wales	Millennium Stadium, Cardiff	2024 Autumn Internationals	17 November 2024	20–52	
10	Wales	Millennium Stadium, Cardiff	2024 Autumn Internationals	17 November 2024	20–52	
11	British & Irish Lions	Melbourne Cricket Ground, Melbourne	2025 British & Irish Lions tour of Australia	26 July 2025	26–29	
12	South Africa	Ellis Park Stadium, Johannesburg	2025 Rugby Championship	16 August 2025	22–38	
13	Italy	Perth Rectangular Stadium, Perth	2026 Nations Championship	18 July 2026	57–10	
14	Japan	Hanazono Rugby Stadium, Higashiōsaka	2026 Australia–Japan Test Series	8 August 2026	35–32	
15	New Zealand	Eden Park, Auckland	2026 Bledisloe Cup	10 October 2026	19–50	
16	New Zealand	Stadium Australia, Sydney	2026 Bledisloe Cup	17 October 2026	21–43	

== Awards and honours ==
Manly-Warringah Sea Eagles U20s

- NRL U20s (Holden Cup): 2017

Brumbies

- Super Rugby AU: 2020

Individual

- ACT Brumbies Best Back: 2024
