= Isaac Henry (rugby union) =

Australian rugby union player

- Born: 8 March 1999 (age 27) Brisbane, Queensland, Australia
- Height: 183 cm (6 ft 0 in)
- Weight: 99 kg (218 lb; 15 st 8 lb)
- School: Brisbane Boys' College

Rugby union career
- Position: Centre
- Current team: Reds
Youth career
- –2016: Brisbane Boys' College
Amateur team(s)
Years	Team	Apps	(Points)
2017–	Wests Bulldogs		
Senior career
Years	Team	Apps	(Points)
2019	Brisbane City	7	(15)
2021–	Reds	20	(37)
- Correct as of 6 June 2026
International career
Years	Team	Apps	(Points)
2022	Australia A	1	(0)
2026–	Australia	7	(0)
- Correct as of 9 November 2026

Isaac Henry (born 8 March 1999) is an Australian rugby union player who plays as a centre for the Reds in Super Rugby and for the Australia national team.

== Early life ==
Henry was born in Brisbane, Queensland in 1999. He attended Brisbane Boys' College (BBC), overcoming a broken rib and a lower back stress fracture to captain the 1st XV in his final year at the school in 2016. Henry also represented the Queensland Country U19s and was in the Australia U20s wider squad in 2018, although did not make an international appearance. He later played for the Wests Bulldogs in the Queensland Premier Rugby.

== Career ==
=== Brisbane City ===
In late 2019, Henry was named in the Brisbane City's 33-man squad ahead of the 2019 National Rugby Championship season. In his maiden season in professional rugby, Henry played seven matches, scoring one try. Henry was also the goal-kicker in one match, scoring two conversions and two from three penalty goals.

=== Reds ===
Henry was named in the Reds squad for the 2021 Super Rugby AU season. Henry was a reserve in the 2021 Super Rugby AU Grand Final against the Brumbies, however did not make an appearance. He subsequently made several appearances for the Reds in the later Trans-Tasman tournament, making two caps off the bench before scoring a double of tries against the Chiefs in round three, his first try for the club. The Reds won 40–34 in Townsville, Far North Queensland, the first rugby union match played at the venue.

He was the teams goal-kicker in their following match against the Blues, scoring three conversion goals.

In 2022, Henry made just three caps for the Reds, all coming as a substitute, scoring one conversion goal. His presence increased the following season, making three starts from four caps, scoring nine points from the tee.

After featuring in two games for the Reds in 2024, Henry suffered a knee injury, rupturing his patellar tendon against the Rebels in round four. He was subsequently ruled out for the remainder of the season and spent 19 months in rehab, missing the entire 2025 season.

Henry returned to the Reds in mid-to-late 2025, making an appearance against the touring British & Irish Lions, before playing two out of the Reds' three Super Rugby AUS matches.

Henry played six matches for the Reds in 2026, starting in five. He played half at outside centre, scoring two tries overall. The Sydney Morning Herald wrote, following his Wallabies call-up in July 2026, that it was "Season 2026 was the most fruitful of Henry’s career, earning six Reds caps. He has not played since round 14, which came after four weeks out nursing further niggling injuries, but was called into Wallabies camp ahead of the Nations Championship clash with Italy as cover."

== International career ==
In July 2022, Henry was called-up to the Australia A squad as an injury replacement ahead of their 2022 Pacific Nations Cup campaign. Henry was a substitute for their match against Fiji, playing just a few minutes late in the game.

In July 2026, Henry received a call-up to the Australia senior camp ahead of their three Test opening series of the Nations Championship. Henry made his Test debut against Japan in the 2026 Australia–Japan Test Series, becoming Wallaby No. 999. He played only a handful of minutes late in the match, which Australia won by three points at Hanazono Rugby Stadium in Osaka.

Henry made his first start with the Wallabies in their following Test, also against Japan, in Townsville. His start was made after Joseph-Aukuso Sua'ali'i, who had started at outside centre, had suffered a minor hamstring strain in the week leading up to the match. Henry's first start for the Wallabies was recgnised as outstanding. RugbyPass gave his performance a 9/10 rating, noting that at half-time he had double the tally of the next best player on defenders beaten. Henry was also among the team leaders for carries, while his game-high two line breaks underlined his attacking threat. He surpassed 60 metres with ball in hand and finishing around the middle of the Wallabies' defensive numbers. The Sydney Morning Herald gave Henry a 7.5/10 performance rating, with former Wallabies coach Ewen McKenzie likening Henry to the Springboks' Jesse Kriel. Australia won the second Test 56–17. Henry went on to make caps in both Australia's Tests against Argentina and New Zealand in their respective series', and was later announced in their squad for the Northern tour of the 2026 Nations Championship. In Australia's first Test of the Northern tour, Henry sustained a hamstring injury and was ruled out of the squad for the remainder of the year.

== Career statistics ==
=== Club ===
As of 18 August 2026.

Statistics by club, season and competition
Club	Season	League						
Club	Season	Division	Apps	Tries	Con.	Pen.	Drop	Points
Brisbane City	2019	National Rugby Championship	7	1	2	2	0	15
Reds	2021	Super Rugby AU	— (Note: Henry was used in the reserves for one match in the 2021 season, although did not play in a match.)					
Reds	2021	Super Rugby Trans-Tasman	5	2	3	0	0	16
Reds	2022	Super Rugby Pacific	3	0	1	0	0	2
Reds	2023	Super Rugby Pacific	4	0	3	1	0	9
Reds	2024	Super Rugby Pacific	2	0	0	0	0	0
Reds	2025	Super Rugby Pacific	—					
Reds	2026	Super Rugby Pacific	6	2	0	0	0	10
Reds	Total		20	4	7	1	0	37
Career total			27	5	9	3	0	52

=== International ===
As of 8 September 2026.

Statistics by team and year
Team	Year	Statistic					
Team	Year	Apps	Tries	Con.	Pen.	Drop	Points
Australia A	2022	1	0	—			0
Australia	2026	7	0	—			0
Total		7	0	—			0
