= Ryūnosuke Itō =

Ryūnosuke Itō 伊藤龍之介
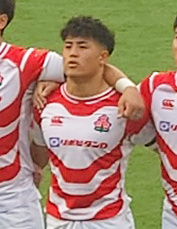
- Itō with Japan in 2026
- Born: 20 November 2004 (age 21) Kanagawa, Japan
- Height: 172 cm (5 ft 8 in)
- Weight: 77 kg (170 lb; 12 st 2 lb)
- University: Meiji University

Rugby union career
- Position: Fly-half
- Current team: Tokyo Sungoliath
Youth career
- 2019: Fujisawa Rugby School
- 2020–2022: Kokugakuin Tochigi High School
- 2023–2026: Meiji University
Senior career
| Years | Team | Apps | (Points) |
| 2026– | Tokyo Sungoliath | 0 | (0) |
- Correct as of 9 August 2026
International career
| Years | Team | Apps | (Points) |
| 2024 | Japan U20 | 4 | (24) |
| 2024–2026 | Japan XV | 4 | (0) |
| 2025 | Japan U23 | 2 | (0) |
| 2026– | Japan | 6 | (5) |
- Correct as of 8 September 2026

Ryūnosuke Itō (伊藤龍之介, Itō Ryūnosuke; born 20 November 2004) is a Japanese rugby union player who plays as a fly-half for Tokyo Sungoliath in the Japan Rugby League One and the Japan national team. After impressing at university level, Itō made his international debut in 2026 for Japan without having played a senior professional rugby match.

== Early life ==
Itō was born in Kanagawa Prefecture in 2004. Itō attended Fujisawa Rugby School through to 2020 before moving to the Kokugakuin Tochigi High School where he excelled at rugby. In 2023, Itō began his university education with Meiji. Itō has two siblings, older brother Kotaro, who also attended Meiji and plays in the Japan Rugby League One for the Ricoh Black Rams, and younger sister Chihiro who plays rugby for Waseda University.

Itō credits his brother his initial passion for rugby.

== Career ==
In 2021, Itō, playing high school rugby for Kokugakuin Tochigi at fly-half, helped secure a 19–0 win against Ryutsu Keizai University Kashiwa to win the Kanto High School Championship for the first time in seven years.

=== University ===
Itō transitioned from Kokugakuin Tochigi High School to Meiji University in 2023, playing three games in his first year. In 2024, Itō played seven games in Meiji's Kanto University Rugby Championship, the qualifier for the All-Japan University Rugby Championship. Itō scored three tries and two conversions for Meiji as they finished third overall, qualifying for the 59th All-Japan University Rugby Championship. Itō played in all three of their University Championship matches, scoring one try as they were knocked out in the semi-finals to defending champions Teikyo.

The following year, Itō played more minutes for Meiji, playing 456 minutes total, and led the team to their first Kanto University Rugby Championship in five years after sealing a 25–19 victory against Waseda University in their 101st rivalry match ahead of the 62nd All-Japan University Championships. Playing in all three of their matches, Itō scored a try in the final against arch-rivals Waseda as they won 22–10. It was his maiden University Championship title, and Meiji's first since 2019.

=== Tokyo Sungoliath ===
In July 2026, Itō was reported to have signed for Tokyo Sungoliath ahead of their 2026–27 season.

== International career ==
In 2024, Itō was called-up to the Japan XV side for the World Rugby Pacific Challenge, held in April in Samoa. Itō started every match at fly-half, although he did not score any tries, and was not the goalkicker. Japan XV won the tournament, winning all three of their matches. He was later called-up to the Japan U20s team for the 2024 World Rugby Under 20 Trophy, the second-tier tournament for global under-20s rugby, held in Scotland. Placed in Pool A alongside the hosts, Scotland U20, Itō's Japan won their opening two games in dominant fashion. In their third and final pool match, Japan lost to Scotland U20 46–10 before beating Uruguay U20 for third.

The following year, Itō was named in a Japan U23, 35-man squad to tour Australia in three matches. Itō played in just two of the matches, one against the Australian Barbarians, one against the Australia under-20s team, ending 1–1.

In 2026, Itō was recalled into the Japan XV squad for their match against the Māori All Blacks in June. Itō played the full 80 minutes at Paloma Mizuho Stadium in Nagoya, creating several chances, and assisting in two tries. Japan XV lost 31–38.

In July 2026, Itō was named in Japan's 37-man squad for the Southern Hemisphere Series of the 2026 Nations Championship. Ahead of the first Test against Italy, Itō was named starting fly-half by forwards coach Neal Hatley. Itō was one of four debutants. Japan won 27–10, their equal largest win against Italy ever. Itō was noted for having a very composed and confident game despite his stature and lack of experience. Japan coaching coordinator Hatley stated of Itō: "The four new caps that came in today made a big impact, and our finishers did as well, with everybody that came on bringing real energy to the team. It’s a very pleasant way to start our season, especially at home." Itō started at fly-half in their remaining two Tests against Ireland and France, respectively. Itō was again named Japan's starting fly-half in their home Test against Australia in the 2026 Australia–Japan Test Series. Putting Australia under pressure in the first ten minutes of the match, Itō opened the scoring with his first international try.

== Career statistics ==
=== Club ===
As of 9 August 2026.

Appearances and tries by club, season and competition
| Club | Season | League | | | |
| Club | Season | Division | Apps | Tries | Points |
|---|---|---|---|---|---|
| Tokyo Sungoliath | 2026–27 | Japan Rugby League One | TBD | | |
| Tokyo Sungoliath | Total | | TBD | | |

=== International ===
As of 9 August 2026.

Statistics by team and year
| Team | Year | Statistic | | |
| Team | Year | Apps | Tries | Points |
|---|---|---|---|---|
| Japan XV | 2024 | 3 | 0 | 0 |
| Japan XV | 2026 | 1 | 0 | 0 |
| Total | | 4 | 0 | 0 |
| Japan | 2026 | 6 | 1 | 5 |
| Total | | 6 | 1 | 5 |

=== International tries ===
List of international tries scored by Ryūnosuke Itō
| No. | Opponent | Location | Competition | Date | Result | Ref. |
|---|---|---|---|---|---|---|
| 1 | Australia | Hanazono Rugby Stadium, Higashiōsaka | 2026 Australia–Japan Test Series | 8 August 2026 | 32–35 | |
