= Brandon Paenga-Amosa =

Australia international rugby union player

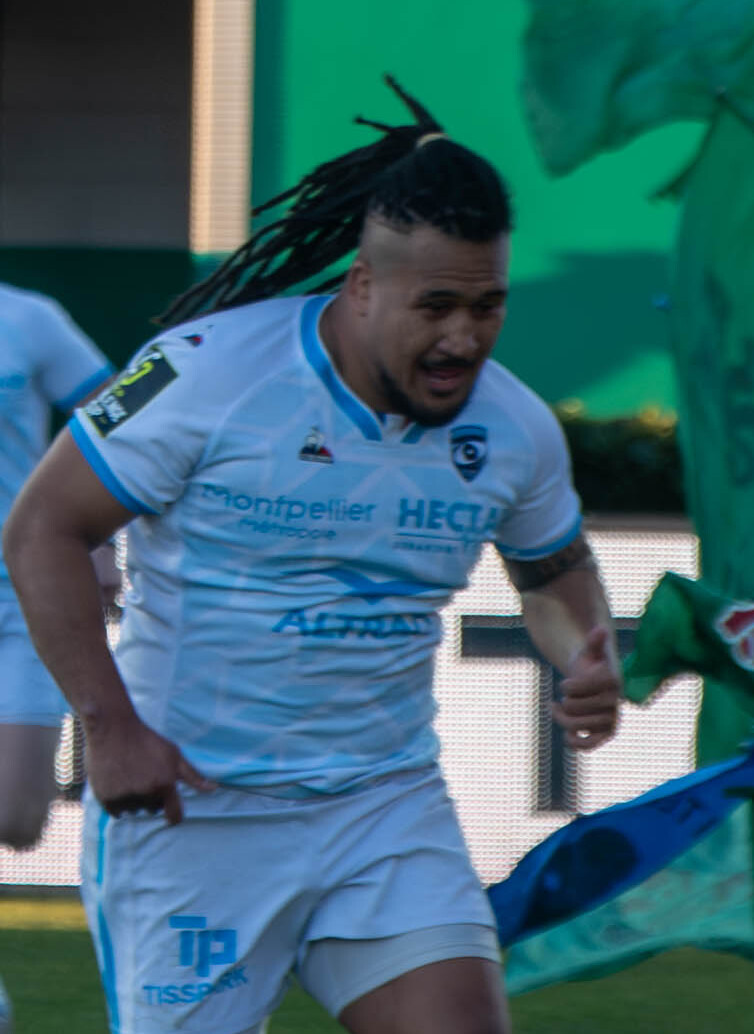
- Paenga-Amosa with Montpellier in 2024
- Full name: Brandon Alexanda Paenga-Amosa
- Born: 25 December 1995 (age 30) Auckland, New Zealand
- Height: 183 cm (6 ft 0 in)
- Weight: 117 kg (258 lb; 18 st 6 lb)
- School: Endeavour Sports High School

Rugby union career
- Position: Hooker
- Current team: Western Force
Youth career
- –2016: Oatley Rugby Club
Amateur team(s)
Years	Team	Apps	(Points)
2014–2016	Southern Districts	43	(70)
Senior career
Years	Team	Apps	(Points)
2016	Greater Sydney Rams	6	(36)
2017	NSW Country Eagles	8	(25)
2018–2021	Reds	55	(70)
2018–2019	Brisbane City	11	(35)
2021–2024	Montpellier	56	(40)
2025–	Force	20	(15)
- Correct as of 22 June 2026
International career
Years	Team	Apps	(Points)
2018–	Australia	32	(30)
2025	First Nations & Pasifika XV	1	(0)
- Correct as of 10 October 2026

Brandon Alexanda Paenga-Amosa (born 25 December 1995), nicknamed "BPA", is a professional rugby union player who plays as a hooker for Super Rugby club Western Force and the Australia national team. Born in New Zealand, he represents Australia at international level after qualifying on residency grounds.

== Early life ==
Brandon Alexandra Paenga-Amosa was born on 25 December 1995 in Auckland, New Zealand. He is of Samoan and Māori descent. His family moved to Australia when he was 4-years-old, settling in Sydney, New South Wales. Until the age of 15, Paenga-Amosa is reported to have only played rugby league, being involved in the Canterbury-Bankstown Bulldogs youth academy. He played junior rugby with Oatley Rugby Club in the South Western Sydney suburb of Riverwood. He attended Endeavour Sports High School, studied theology, and was a youth worker at Hillsong College. While at Endeavour Sports High School Paenga-Amosa switched from playing rugby league to rugby union. After his switch Paenga-Amosa was selected in a Combined High Schools team alongside Lukhan Salakaia-Loto (known as Lukhan Tui). Paenga-Amosa later played senior rugby with Southern Districts in the Shute Shield. While playing for Southern Districts Paenga-Amosa worked as a garbage collector in Sydney alongside future Wallabies hooker Folau Fainga'a.

Paenga-Amosa has stated that his idol growing up was New Zealand fly-half Carlos Spencer; he also supported the Blues and was a diehard All Blacks fan.

== Career ==
=== Reds ===
Paenga-Amosa was reported to have been in and out of the New South Wales Waratahs program while playing for the Southern Districts in the Shute Shield, the club he began his senior career with. His strong scrummaging and physical presence earned attention at higher levels, and was later picked up by the Greater Sydney Rams in the National Rugby Championship (NRC). After one season (2016) with the Greater Sydney Rams, Paenga-Amosa was picked up by rural-based New South Wales club, the New South Wales Country Eagles for 2017. He appeared in all eight of the Country Eagles' fixtures for the season, and scored a hat-trick in the final match of the season against Brisbane City, which finished 38-all. Ahead of the 2018 Super Rugby season, Paenga-Amosa was offered a position with the Melbourne Rebels in their wider training squad. However, following the retirement of Queensland Reds hooker Stephen Moore, new coach Brad Thorn offered Paenga-Amosa a two-year contract, to which he signed. Months later, reflecting on his move to the Reds, Paenga-Amosa stated: "I was kind of star struck, having this idol of mine [Brad Thorn] call me, asking me if I wanted to come up to Brisbane. As soon as I spoke to him, I jumped in the car and drove to Queensland."

Paenga-Amosa was the Reds' first-choice hooker for 2018. He played in every match for the youthful Reds and scored four tries throughout the season. Early into the season the Reds pulled off two major wins against dominant scrummaging sides: rivals the Brumbies, and the Pretoria-based Bulls. These wins were noted as the Reds' forward pack was significantly younger and inexperienced than their opponents. Paenga-Amosa played a further sixteen games for the Reds in their following season (2019), although only starting in six. He scored five tries, one more than the previous season. At the end of the season Paenga-Amosa signed a two-year contract extension.

In the first round of the 2020 Super Rugby season (February 2020), Paenga‑Amosa suffered ankle ligament damage during a match against the Brumbies in Canberra, forcing him to exit early and undergo medical assessment. This injury occurred just as he was poised to reclaim the starting hooker spot from Alex Mafi, after a strong off‑season. Paenga-Amosa returned ahead of the newly-created Super Rugby AU competition, and was a regular starter in the lineup. Paenga-Amosa played in every Reds match of the 2020 Super Rugby AU season, including the 28–23 final defeat against the Brumbies. Throughout 2020, Paenga‑Amosa was influential in maintaining forward momentum, set‑pieces (especially lineout and scrums from the hooker role), and showed a more physical presence. Media comment noted his "ball‑carrying" and collision work reminiscent, provocatively, of players like Ma'a Nonu.

Early in the 2021 season, Paenga‑Amosa was sidelined with a neck injury, delaying his squad involvement until round four of the 2021 Super Rugby AU season. Post‑injury Paenga‑Amosa notably helped restore some stability to the hooker position and restore depth to the Reds' forward pack. Australian sports website, The Roar, suggested that set‑piece execution (especially lineout throwing) was an area where the Reds hoped Paenga‑Amosa could contribute improvements when healthy. Paenga‑Amosa played twelve matches for the Reds in 2021, including the Final victory over the Brumbies and the Super Rugby Trans-Tasman.

=== Montpellier ===
In early July 2021 it was confirmed that Paenga-Amosa had signed for Montpellier in the French Top 14 competition. In his first season with Montpellier, he made seventeen appearances in all competitions, including thirteen in the Top 14, starting in six. In European competition (the Champions Cup) he made four appearances. He scored one try in the Top 14 and contributed about 606 minutes in domestic play. In June 2022 Paenga-Amosa replaced Guilhem Guirado in the 26th minute of the 2021–22 Top 14 Final against Castres (whom came off with a concussion). Montpellier won 29–10 in what was their first French title since being established in 1986.

In the following season 2022–23, Paenga‑Amosa's role increased. He played twenty-four matches for Montpellier in all competitions, of which nineteen were in the Top 14, and was a starter in twelve of those Top 14 matches. He also played five matches in the Champions Cup. He scored five tries in the Top 14 during the season. He also played approximately 995 minutes domestically during that campaign.

In his final season with Montpellier (2023–24), Paenga‑Amosa made twelve Top 14 appearances, starting in eight of those, scoring one try, with about 497 minutes played domestically. He also made three appearances in the Challenge Cup. Though slightly less prominent than in 2022–23, he continued to be a front‑row squad member when selected, contributing in both set‑piece and contact phases. In an interview with RugbyPass, Paenga-Amosa said that one area he improved in was his scrummaging, particularly in adapting to how hookers in the Top 14 are pressured. He mentioned being more exposed to the French tight‑head players who "take that angle", try to break the seam between the loose‑head prop and hooker. He said his exposure in French rugby forced him to raise his technique.

=== Western Force ===
In April 2024 it was announced that Paenga-Amosa had returned to Australia, signing a long-term deal with the Perth-based Western Force ahead of the 2025 Super Rugby Pacific season. His recruitment was part of a wider forward‑pack strengthening strategy for the Force, which included additions such as Nic Dolly, Harry Johnson-Holmes, Darcy Swain, Will Harris, among others. In an interview with Rugby.com.au, Paenga-Amosa said that his time in France and his experience as a father have contributed to increased composure, better preparation for contests, and greater leadership in tight phases; with Green and Gold Rugby (GAGR) commenting on a "wealth of experience and renewed sense of purpose" Paenga-Amosa would now bring to the Super Rugby after his stint in France.

Paenga-Amosa played seven matches for the Force in 2025, scoring two tries.

== International career ==
On 30 May 2018, Australia coach Michael Cheika named Paenga-Amosa in their 32-man squad for their three-test series against Ireland. Paenga-Amosa was named as the starting hooker in the first test on 9 June 2018. Paenga-Amosa made his debut in Australia's 18–9 win at Lang Park, Brisbane. Paenga-Amosa started in Australia's following two tests against Ireland. Australia lost the series 1–2.

In 2019 Paenga-Amosa was not selected for Australia in any tournament, including the 2019 Rugby World Cup. Paenga-Amosa was renamed in the Australia squad for the 2020 Autumn Internationals, starting in the Wallabies' second Bledisloe Cup test at Eden Park. In Australia's next four matches, which took place in the 2020 Tri-Nations Series, Paenga-Amosa started at hooker.

In 2021 Paenga-Amosa started in Australia's first five matches of the season, scoring his first international try in their first test on France's 2021 tour of Australia. In the latter-half of the season Paenga-Amosa was contracted with Montpellier in the French Top 14 and was not selected for the remainder of the year.

Between late 2021 and mid-2024, Paenga-Amosa, whom played rugby in France, was not eligible for Wallabies selection due to not meeting the requisite criteria laid out in giteau's law. After being re-signed to an Australian Super Rugby team in early 2024, he was named in the Wallabies squad ahead of their two-tests against New Zealand in the 2024 Rugby Championship. Paenga-Amosa played both tests as a substitute, coming on for Queensland Reds hooker Matt Faessler. He also joined the team on the 2024 Grand Slam tour, being a substitute in the first two test, before starting in the latter two.

Paenga-Amosa scored his second international try in August 2025 against South Africa at Cape Town Stadium. Australia lost 30–22.

== Career statistics ==
=== Club ===
As of 11 November 2026.

Statistics by club, season and competition
Club	Season	League				Other			Total		
Club	Season	Division	Apps	Tries	Points	Apps	Tries	Points	Apps	Tries	Points
Greater Sydney Rams	2016 (Note: In the 2016 season, the National Rugby Championship trialled a law in which the value of a try was worth six points instead of the usual five.)	National Rugby Championship	6	6	36	—			6	6	36
NSW Country Eagles	2017	National Rugby Championship	8	5	25	—			8	5	25
Brisbane City	2018	National Rugby Championship	4	1	5	—			4	1	5
Brisbane City	2019	National Rugby Championship	7	6	30	—			7	6	30
Brisbane City	Total		11	7	35	—			11	7	35
Reds	2018	Super Rugby	16	4	20	—			16	4	20
Reds	2019	Super Rugby	16	5	25	—			16	5	25
Reds	2020	Super Rugby	1	0	0	—			1	0	0
Reds	2020	Super Rugby AU	10	2	10	—			10	2	10
Reds	2021	Super Rugby AU	7	0	0	—			7	0	0
Reds	2021	Super Rugby Trans-Tasman	5	3	15	—			5	3	15
Reds	Total		55	14	70	—			55	14	70
Montpellier	2021–22	Top 14	13	1	5	4 (Note: Appearances in the 2021–22 Champions Cup.)	0	0	17	1	5
Montpellier	2022–23	Top 14	19	5	25	5 (Note: Appearances in the 2022–23 Champions Cup.)	1	5	24	6	30
Montpellier	2023–24	Top 14	12	1	5	3 (Note: Appearances in the 2023–24 Challenge Cup.)	0	0	15	1	5
Montpellier	Total		44	7	35	12	1	5	56	8	40
Force	2025	Super Rugby Pacific	7	2	10	—			7	2	10
Force	2026	Super Rugby Pacific	13	1	5	—			13	1	5
Force	Total		20	3	15	—			20	3	15
Career total			144	42	210	12	1	5	156	43	215

=== International ===
As of 11 November 2026.

Statistics by team and year
Team	Year	Statistic		
Team	Year	Apps	Tries	Points
Australia	2018	4	0	0
Australia	2020	5	0	0
Australia	2021	5	1	5
Australia	2024	6	0	0
Australia	2025	5	1	5
Australia	2026	7	4	20
Total		32	6	30

=== International tries ===
List of international tries scored by Brandon Paenga-Amosa
No.	Opponent	Location	Competition	Date	Result	Ref.
1	France	Lang Park, Brisbane	2021 France tour of Australia	7 July 2021	23–21	
2	South Africa	Cape Town Stadium, Cape Town	2025 Rugby Championship	23 August 2025	22–30	
3	France	Lang Park, Brisbane	2026 Nations Championship	11 July 2026	26–42	
4	Italy	Perth Rectangular Stadium, Perth	2026 Nations Championship	18 July 2026	57–10	
5	Japan	North Queensland Stadium, Townsville	2026 Australia–Japan Test Series	15 August 2026	56–17	
6	Argentina	Estadio 23 de Agosto, San Salvador de Jujuy	2026 Australia tour of Argentina	29 August 2026	27–21	
