= Les Kiss =

Australian rugby coach and rugby league footballer (born 1964)

Personal information
- Born: 9 December 1964 (age 61) Bundaberg, Queensland, Australia

Playing information
- Position: Wing
Club
Years	Team	Pld	T	G	FG	P
–1986	Fortitude Valley
1986–93	North Sydney Bears	100	29	38	0	192
	Total	100	29	38	0	192
Representative
Years	Team	Pld	T	G	FG	P
1986–90	Queensland	4	3	0	0	12
1986	Australia	4	2	0	0	8

Coaching information
Club
Years	Team	Gms	W	D	L	W%
1999	London Broncos	30	13	2	15	43
2001	Northern Eagles (assistant)	26	11	1	14	42
	Total	56	24	3	29	43
- Source: As of 9 March 2018

Rugby union career
Coaching career
- Years: Team
- 2001–2002: South Africa (Defence coach)
- 2002: Bulls; Stormers; Cats (Advisor)
- 2003: Australia U21 (Assistant coach)
- 2002–2008: Waratahs (Assistant coach)
- 2003–2007: Australia A (Assistant coach)
- 2009–2015: Ireland (Assistant coach)
- 2015–2018: Ulster (Director of Rugby)
- 2018–2023: London Irish
- 2024–2026: Queensland Reds
- 2026–: Australia
- Correct as of 7 September 2026

Les Kiss (born 9 December 1964) is an Australian rugby union coach and former rugby league coach and professional rugby league footballer, representing Queensland in the State of Origin. Kiss is the current head coach of the Australia national rugby union team. Prior to this he was head coach of London Irish in the Gallagher Premiership until the club went into administration in June 2023. He then went home to coach Queensland Reds until his move back to international coaching.

On 30 April 2025, it was announced by the Australian Rugby Union that Kiss is anticipated to succeed Joe Schmidt as the next head coach of the Wallabies, the Australian men's senior rugby union team beginning mid 2026.

== Rugby league career ==
Kiss was a Bundaberg Past Brothers junior who went on to play 100 first grade games in the NSW Rugby League Premiership for the North Sydney Bears between 1986 and 1993. A handy goalkicker, he had an injury-restricted career, and retired in 1993.

Les Kiss scored only 29 tries for Norths in his 100 games but despite not being the fastest wing, and with a best haul of nine tries in a season (1986), he was considered to be one of the best defensive wingers in the Sydney competition. He also kicked 38 goals from 64 attempts (59.38%) for the Bears with his best season again being his debut year (1986) when he kicked 23/38 at 60.53%.

Les Kiss was originally from Bundaberg in Queensland, and played his first senior football with the Fortitude Valley Diehards club in the Brisbane Rugby League competition in 1985. He first gained selection for The Maroons in Game 2 of the 1986 State of Origin series at the Sydney Cricket Ground. Playing on the wing, Kiss scored a try on debut in a losing side (NSW won the 1986 series 3–0) and he scored another in Game 3 at Lang Park.

Benefiting from an injury to fellow Queenslander Dale Shearer, Kiss was then selected to play for Australia in the second test against New Zealand at the Cricket Ground and retained his spot for the final game in Brisbane.

Kiss's good form continued for the Bears and he was an obvious selection for the 1986 Kangaroo Tour. Before the actual tour got underway in England, the Australians played a test against Papua New Guinea in Port Moresby. There Kiss scored his only two test tries in a 62–12 win. He was then selected for the first Ashes test against Great Britain at Old Trafford with the Aussies winning 38-16 before an injury in a tour match against Halifax in the game following the first test put an end to his tour. His place in the test side was taken by speedy Manly-Warringah outside back Dale Shearer whose own form earned him a recall to the side (ironically it had been an injury to Shearer while playing for Manly after the first test against NZ earlier in the year which had seen Kiss called into the side). Kiss' injury restricted him to just 4 games on the Kangaroo Tour with his only try coming in the Kangaroos 26–18 win against Wigan at Central Park in the opening game of the tour. The 1986 Kangaroos would emulate the undefeated 1982 Kangaroo tour, with the 1986 squad earning themselves the nickname "The Unbeatables".

Les Kiss then had a wait of four years before he tasted representative football again. He was selected for games 1 and 2 of the 1990 Origin series. Queensland lost both games and Kiss was one of the players dropped for Game 3 (replaced by Willie Carne). In what turned out to be a brief representative career, Les Kiss played in 4 games for Queensland (all losses) and 4 games for Australia (all wins) scoring a total of 3 Origin and 2 Test tries.

In 2008, rugby league in Australia's centenary year, Kiss was named on the wing of the Bundaberg Rugby League's team of the century.

Kiss worked as an assistant rugby league coach for the London Broncos Super League club and then as joint head coach with former North Sydney teammate Tony Rea.

== Rugby union career ==
=== Coaching ===
Kiss worked as a defence coach for the Springboks in South Africa in 2001–02, and was an assistant coach with the New South Wales Waratahs from 2002 until 2008.

Kiss was appointed defensive coach with Ireland under head coach Declan Kidney in 2009, sharing in a triumphant Grand Slam victory that had eluded Ireland for 61 years in his first year in the job. After Kidney's departure on 2 April 2013, Kiss became the head coach of the Ireland team as an interim appointment for their 2013 summer tour to North America. Kiss resumed his role as defence coach after the tour when Joe Schmidt took over late in 2013. On 30 June 2014, Kiss became the interim director of rugby at Ulster, following the departures of Mark Anscombe and David Humphreys.

In January 2018, Kiss announced his resignation as Ulster Director of Rugby.

In March 2018, he and Declan Kidney were reunited when they were appointed by London Irish. Kiss became head coach with Kidney appointed technical consultant. Kidney later became Director of Rugby.

On 23 July 2023, Kiss was announced as the new head coach of the Queensland Reds for the 2024 season, through to 2026, taking over the role from Brad Thorn.

On 30 April 2025, Rugby Australia revealed that Kiss would succeed Joe Schmidt as head coach of Australia in mid-2026. His first Test match in charge came against Eddie Jones's Japan in Osaka during the 2026 Australia–Japan Test Series. Australia won first Test (35–32) in hot conditions, and ultimately won the series 2–0 following a second Test victory on home soil. Australia's following two matches came against Argentina in another Test series, their first tour of the country since 2000. Australia won the first Test 27–21, and drew the second 28-all to reclaim the Puma Trophy. It was Australia's first series victory in Argentina, and the best starting run to a new Wallabies coaching tenure since Robbie Deans in 2008.

The Wallabies under Kiss also reclaimed the Mandela Challenge Plate after defeating South Africa in Perth, although went on a four-Test loss streak toward the end of the year, with losses to New Zealand in the Bledisloe series, and England and Scotland in the Northern Hemisphere Series of the Nations Championship.

== Coaching statistics ==
=== International record ===
As of 16 November 2026

Team	Tenure	Played	Won	Drawn	Lost	W%	For	Against
Australia	July 2026–	9	4	1	4	44.44	262	289
Total		9	4	1	4	44.44	262	289
