= Taniela Tupou (rugby union) =

Australian rugby union footballer (born 1996)

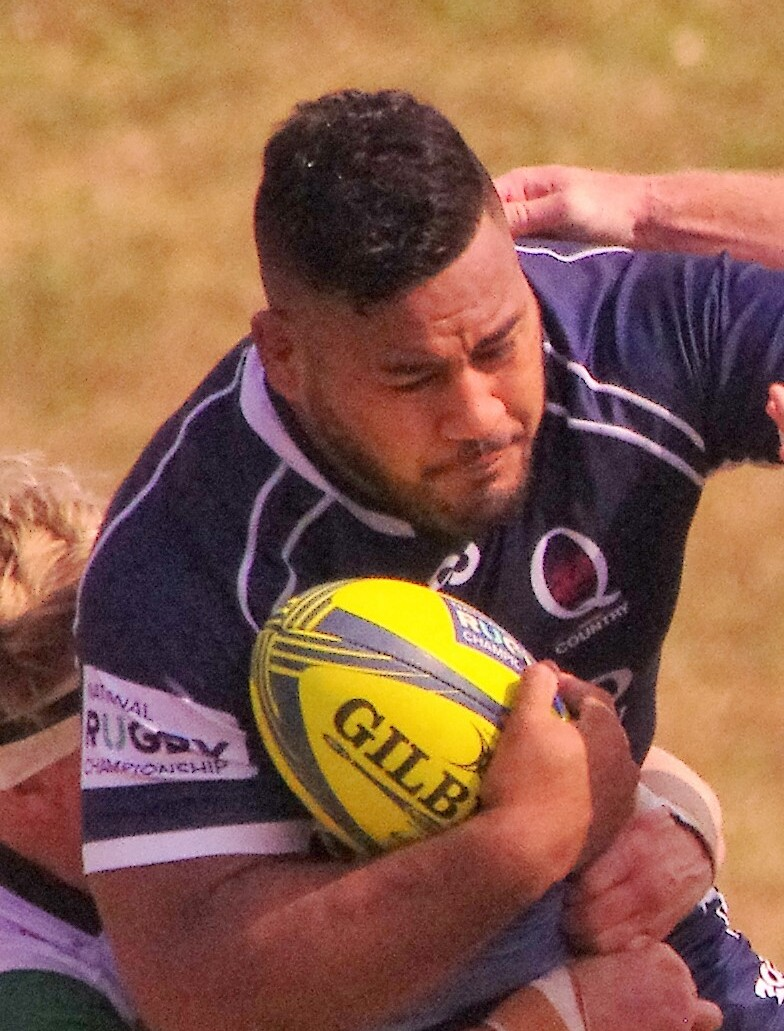
- Tupou with Queensland Country in the 2017 National Rugby Championship
- Born: 10 May 1996 (age 30) Tofoa, Tongatapu, Tonga
- Height: 184 cm (6 ft 0 in)
- Weight: 148 kg (23 st 4 lb)
- School: Sacred Heart College, Auckland

Rugby union career
- Position: Prop
- Current team: Racing 92
Senior career
Years	Team	Apps	(Points)
2015–2017	Queensland Country	21	(41)
2015–2023	Reds	87	(120)
2024	Rebels	14	(5)
2025	Waratahs	13	(5)
2026–	Racing 92	12	(25)
- Correct as of 11 August 2026
International career
Years	Team	Apps	(Points)
2017–	Australia	76	(50)
2023	Australia A	1	(0)
2025	First Nations & Pasifika XV	1	(0)
- Correct as of 27 September 2026

Taniela Tupou (born 10 May 1996), nicknamed "Nella" and the "Tongan Thor", is a professional rugby union player who currently plays as a prop for Top 14 club Racing 92. Born in Tonga, Tupou represents Australia at international level.

== Early life and junior career ==
Tupou was born in 1996 in Tongatapu, Tonga's main island.

Tupou became known as a schoolboy rugby player. While playing for Auckland's Sacred Heart College First XV in 2014, he became an internet sensation for his three tries against Kelston Boys High School, earning him the nickname "Tongan Thor".

On 22 June 2014, he was named in the Pacific Barbarians squad, captained by All Black legend Justin Marshall, to play Tonga during the 2014 mid-year rugby union internationals. Tonga won the match 36–14 at Mount Smart Stadium in Auckland.

The following month Tupou was given a deadline to sign a loyalty agreement to be eligible for the New Zealand Schoolboys team. However, he declined the offer. Despite interest from rugby clubs in France and England as well as New Zealand Super Rugby franchises Chiefs and Blues, Tupou's desire to play for the Wallabies lured him to Australia where his brother, Criff Tupou, resided.

Michael Cheika, head coach of the New South Wales Waratahs commented that he had an eye on Tupou well before he emerged on television with his three-try effort, but on 12 September 2014 Tupou was officially named in the Queensland Reds squad for the 2015 season.

== Career ==
=== Reds ===
Tupou played his first game for the Brothers Old Boys club in 2015, in a trial match alongside his 25-year-old brother Criff Tupou. After completing the full 2015 season in Queensland Premier Rugby with Brothers, he joined Queensland Country to play in the National Rugby Championship.

After playing for Queensland U20s in 2016, he made his debut for the Reds in 2016. Tupou toured as a development player in the Australian national squad for their 2016 Spring Tour.

During the 2016 Super Rugby season, Tupou made his Reds debut on 1 July against their Rod Macqueen Cup rivals, the Brumbies. His first campaign was limited to three appearances, all from the bench, but he began to establish himself as an increasingly important member of the squad the following year. In 2017, Tupou featured in 14 matches for the Reds, starting four of them. He also enjoyed an outstanding NRC campaign with Queensland Country, helping the side secure the championship while making nine appearances and scoring four tries. He quickly became one of Australia's most promising front-rowers.

By 2019, Tupou had established himself as one of the country's premier props, prompting him to extend his contract with both the Reds and Rugby Australia (RA) through 2023. The following season saw him play a key role in the Reds' run to the Super Rugby AU final, where they ultimately fell to the Brumbies. In 2021, the two sides met again in the decider, but this time the Reds prevailed, securing their first Super Rugby title since 2011.

=== Rebels ===
Tupou's career was interrupted in 2023 when a ruptured Achilles tendon ruled him out for the entire Super Rugby season. Despite the setback, his next move had already been confirmed: in February, it was announced that he would join the Melbourne Rebels for the 2024 season. Tupou spent a single season with the Rebels playing 14 matches and scoring one try as the team made their maiden finals appearance. The Rebels ultimately lost in the quarter-finals to the Hurricanes. The Rebels were later axed from the competition entirely due to severe financial difficulties.

=== Waratahs ===
With the Rebels franchise's demise leaving him without a team, Tupou considered a move to Europe but ultimately opted to remain in Australia, signing a one-season contract with the Waratahs, joining several Wallabies teammates at the club. At the start of the season Tupou was consistently the Waratahs' first choice tight-head prop. Toward the middle of the season he became a finisher, being used as a substitute in five of the Waratahs' matches between rounds eight and fourteen. He played a total 13 games, scoring two tries. Ultimately it was a poor season for the Waratahs: they finished bottom of the ladder for the first time in their professional history.

=== Racing 92 ===
Following his season with the Waratahs, Tupou made the move to France, signing with Racing 92 of the Top 14. He joined the Paris-based club after the 2025 Autumn Internationals and made an immediate impact on his debut against Montauban, scoring twice after entering the match in the 45th minute. Remarkably, he repeated the feat just two rounds later against Lyon. He scored another try three rounds later to finish the season with five tries to his name from 12 matches.

== International career ==
Tupou was first called into the Wallabies squad in October 2016 by head coach Michael Cheika for Australia's 2016 Spring Tour. Although he was not yet eligible to represent Australia at international level, his inclusion in the training squad was intended to familiarise him with the demands and expectations of international rugby.

He became eligible for selection the following year and made his Test debut for Australia on 25 November 2017, coming off the bench against Scotland at Murrayfield Stadium.

By 2019, Tupou had established himself as the Wallabies' leading understudy to veteran tighthead prop Sekope Kepu, earning recognition for his impact and consistency when introduced from the bench. In August of that year, he was selected in Australia's squad for the Rugby World Cup in Japan. He featured in three matches during the tournament, all as a replacement, including the quarter-final defeat to England.

Following the World Cup and Kepu's retirement from international rugby, Tupou assumed a more prominent role in the Wallabies' front row, sharing the tighthead position with Allan Alaalatoa.

In June 2023, Tupou was selected by Eddie Jones for the shortened 2023 Rugby Championship. He was subsequently named in Australia's 33-man squad for the 2023 Rugby World Cup in France. Tupou started the Wallabies' opening pool match against Georgia but was ruled out for the remainder of the tournament after sustaining a hamstring injury.

He continued to feature regularly for Australia thereafter, representing the Wallabies in the 2024 and 2025 Rugby Championships as well as a number of Test matches. He was also part of the Australian side that recorded its only victory of the 2025 British & Irish Lions tour.

Tupou was selected in the Wallabies squad for their inaugural 2026 Nations Championship Tests in July. He played in the opening two matches, and was recalled for Australia's two-Test series against Japan the following month. On 15 August 2026, in a Test match against Japan in the Australia–Japan Test Series, Tupou scored two tries. Tupou became the first Wallaby prop to score twice in a Test match in 95 years.

== Career statistics ==
=== Club ===
As of 17 August 2026.

Statistics by club, season and competition
Club	Season	League			
Club	Season	Division	Apps	Tries	Points
Queensland Country	2015	National Rugby Championship	5	3	15
Queensland Country	2016 (Note: In the 2016 season, the National Rugby Championship trialled a law in which the value of a try was worth six points instead of the usual five.)	National Rugby Championship	7	1	6
Queensland Country	Total		12	4	21
Reds	2016	Super Rugby	3	1	5
Queensland Country	2017	National Rugby Championship	9	4	20
Reds	2017	Super Rugby	14	3	15
Reds	2018	Super Rugby	15	4	20
Reds	2019	Super Rugby	15	4	20
Reds	2020	Super Rugby	7	3	15
Reds	2020	Super Rugby AU	10	1	5
Reds	2021	Super Rugby AU	9	5	25
Reds	2021	Super Rugby Trans-Tasman	5	0	0
Reds	2022	Super Rugby Pacific	9	3	25
Reds	2023	Super Rugby Pacific	—		
Reds	Total		84	23	115
Rebels	2024	Super Rugby Pacific	14	1	5
Waratahs	2025	Super Rugby Pacific	13	1	5
Racing 92	2025–26	Top 14	12	5	25
Career total			147	39	195

=== International ===
As of 17 August 2026.

Statistics by team and year
Team	Year	Statistic		
Team	Year	Apps	Tries	Points
Australia	2017	1	0	0
Australia	2018	10	2	10
Australia	2019	8	0	0
Australia	2020	6	1	5
Australia	2021	13	2	10
Australia	2022	10	1	5
Australia	2023	4	0	0
Australia	2024	8	1	5
Australia	2025	10	0	0
Australia	2026	4	3	15
Total		74	10	50

=== International tries ===
List of international tries scored by Taniela Tupou
No.	Opponent	Location	Competition	Date	Result	Ref.
1	Ireland	Melbourne Rectangular Stadium, Melbourne	2018 Ireland tour of Australia	16 June 2018	21–26	
2	Italy	Stadio Euganeo, Padua	2018 Autumn Internationals	17 November 2018	26–7	
3	New Zealand	Lang Park, Brisbane	2020 Tri Nations Series	7 November 2020	24–22	
4	France	Lang Park, Brisbane	2021 France tour of Australia	17 July 2021	33–30	
5	Japan	Showa Denko Dome Oita, Ōita	2021 Autumn Internationals	23 October 2021	32–23	
6	England	Lang Park, Brisbane	2022 England tour of Australia	9 July 2022	17–25	
7	Wales	Sydney Football Stadium, Sydney	2024 Wales tour of Australia	6 July 2024	25–16	
8	Japan	Hanazono Rugby Stadium, Higashiōsaka	2026 Australia–Japan Test Series	8 August 2026	35–32	
9	Japan	North Queensland Stadium, Townsville	2026 Australia–Japan Test Series	15 August 2026	56–17	
10	Japan	North Queensland Stadium, Townsville	2026 Australia–Japan Test Series	15 August 2026	56–17	

== Awards and honours ==
Queensland Reds

- Super Rugby AU: 2021

Queensland Country

- National Rugby Championship: 2017

Individual

- Australian Super Rugby Player of the Year: 2018, 2020
- Rugby Australia Rookie of the Year: 2018
- Queensland Reds Players' Player (Pilecki Medal): 2020, 2021
