= Massimo de Lutiis =

Australian rugby union player

- Born: 18 November 2003 (age 22) Sydney, Australia
- Height: 188 cm (6 ft 2 in)
- Weight: 126 kg (278 lb; 19 st 12 lb)
- School: The Southport School

Rugby union career
- Position: Prop
- Current team: Reds
Senior career
Years	Team	Apps	(Points)
2024–	Reds	13	(0)
- Correct as of 6 June 2026
International career
Years	Team	Apps	(Points)
2023	Australia U20	1	(0)
2024	Australia XV	1	(0)
2026–	Australia	5	(5)
- Correct as of 17 October 2026

Massimo de Lutiis (born 18 November 2003) is an Australian rugby union player, who plays for the Reds. His preferred position is prop.

== Early career ==
De Lutiis was born in Sydney to an Italian-Australian father and a mother of Irish descent. He later moved to Queensland, where he attended The Southport School. He plays club rugby for Wests, and spent time in both the Reds and Brumbies academies. He represented Australia U20 in both 2022 and 2023.

== Club career ==
De Lutiis made his debut for Queensland in their tour match against Saitama Wild Knights in 2023. He was named in the Reds squad for the 2024 Super Rugby Pacific season but did not make an appearance, before again being named in the squad in 2025. He made his Super Rugby debut in Round 2 of the 2025 Super Rugby Pacific season against Moana Pasifika.

De Lutiis set a bench press record of 202.5 kilograms across all Queensland football codes.

== International career ==
In November 2024, de Lutiis was named in the Australia XV squad for their tour match against England A. He was called into the Australia training camp squad in December 2024.

On 15 August 2026, de Lutiis made his debut for Australia in their 56-17 win over Japan in Townsville. De Lutiis replaced Taniela Tupou in the 47th minute, becoming the 1000th player for the Wallabies; he scored a try in the 59th minute.
