= Lucas Paulos =

Argentine rugby union player (born 1998)

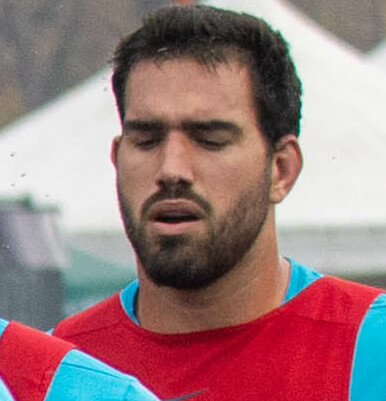
- Full name: Lucas Martin Paulos Adler
- Born: 9 January 1998 (age 28) Buenos Aires, Argentina
- Height: 6 ft 6.5 in (1.99 m)
- Weight: 271 lb (123 kg; 19 st 5 lb)

Rugby union career
- Position: Lock
Senior career
Years	Team	Apps	(Points)
2020−	Brive	37	(15)
Super Rugby
Years	Team	Apps	(Points)
2019–2020	Jaguares	11	(0)
- Correct as of 17 May 2019
International career
Years	Team	Apps	(Points)
	Argentina	10	
- Correct as of 19 November 2022

Lucas Paulos (born 9 January 1998) is an Argentine rugby union player who plays for the Jaguares. On 28 December 2018, Vivas was named in the Jaguares squad for the 2019 Super Rugby season. His playing position is Lock. He started playing in the División de Honor B team Club de Rugby Majadahonda.
