= Faulua Makisi =

Japan international rugby union player

- Full name: Faulua Makisi
- Born: 20 January 1997 (age 29) Tonga
- Height: 1.87 m (6 ft 2 in)
- Weight: 110 kg (17 st 5 lb; 240 lb)

Rugby union career
- Position(s): Flanker, Number 8
- Current team: Kubota Spears
Senior career
Years	Team	Apps	(Points)
2020–present	Kubota Spears	93	(175)
- Correct as of 11 November 2021
International career
Years	Team	Apps	(Points)
2015–2017	Japan U20	13	(40)
2015–2017	Junior Japan	9	(25)
2019–	Japan	29	(10)
- Correct as of 11 November 2021

Faulua Makisi (マキシ ファウルア, Faurua makishi; born 20 January 1997) is a Japanese rugby union player who plays as a flanker. He currently plays for Kubota Spears Funabashi Tokyo Bay in Japan's domestic Japan Rugby League One.

== International ==
Makisi was called for his country on 25 October 2021 for the 2021 end-of-year rugby union internationals, having previously played two matches for Japan in 2019 and represented Junior Japan.
