= RugbyPass =

Rugby digital media platform

- Type: Private
- Industry: Sportscasting, Radio, Television, Publishing
- Founded: 2016
- Headquarters: Dublin, Ireland
- Area served: Global
- Owner: World Rugby
- Website: www.rugbypass.com

RugbyPass is a global digital media platform owned and operated by World Rugby, which provides Rugby Union livestreaming, news, and video content online and across different platforms.

World Rugby acquired the platform in 2022, ahead of the 2023 Rugby World Cup, from Sky Sport (NZ) and has extended the platform with the introduction of RugbyPass TV, a dedicated streaming and on demand service under the RugbyPass brand.

RugbyPass's global headquarters are located at World Rugby House in Dublin, Ireland.

== History ==
RugbyPass was founded in 2015, by the New Zealand-based company Coliseum Sports Media a rugby streaming and media site. In 2019 it was acquired by Sky Sports New Zealand, under the ownership of Sky, the service gradually moved away from a live match streaming model and began to focus more on distributing news, analysis, video shows, highlights, podcasts, and documentaries.

in 2022 World Rugby acquired RugbyPass and its global stable of digital properties as part of a wide-ranging rights deal with Sky New Zealand. The acquisition aimed to enhance World Rugby's direct-to-consumer offerings and expand its digital footprint.

In 2023 it launched RugbyPass TV, which streams live matches and other streamed and on demand content.

== RugbyPass TV ==
RugbyPass TV
- Founded: 2023
- Area served: Global
- Owner: World Rugby
- Website: rugbypass.tv

In 2023, world rugby established RugbyPassTV a free streaming and on demand service under the RugbyPass brand.

The service streams and has available on demand, rugby matches, highlights, tournaments from fixtures around the world, as well as documentaries, series, live shows and podcasts and holds the Rugby World Cup live match streaming rights for 16 Countries that didn't previously have rugby broadcasting deals.

The service is available on multiple platforms including Online, Smart TVs and Smart Devices.
