= 2024 Ireland rugby union tour of South Africa =

- Coach: Andy Farrell
- Tour captain(s): Peter O'Mahony; Caelan Doris
- Top test point scorer: Jack Crowley (19)
- Top test try scorer: Conor Murray (2)
Summary
P	W	D	L
Total
2	1	0	1
Test match
2	1	0	1
Opponent
P	W	D	L
South Africa
2	1	0	1

Tour chronology
- ← New Zealand 2022 Europe 2025 →

The Ireland rugby union team toured South Africa in July 2024. They played two test matches against the South Africa rugby union team, as part of the 2024 Summer Internationals. It was Ireland's seventh tour to South Africa, and their first test series against the Springboks since 2016.

== Fixtures ==
Date	Venue	Home	Score	Away	Source
6 July 2024	Loftus Versfeld Stadium, Pretoria	South Africa	27–20	Ireland	Report
13 July 2024	Kings Park Stadium, Durban	South Africa	24–25	Ireland	Report

== Squads ==
=== Ireland ===
On 18 June 2024, Ireland head coach Andy Farrell named a 35-player squad for the summer tests against South Africa. Dave Heffernan and the uncapped Nathan Doak were added to the squad after injuries to Craig Casey and Dan Sheehan in the first test.

Ages, caps and clubs are as of 13 July 2024

Player	Position	Date of birth (age)	Caps	Club/province
Dave Heffernan	Hooker	31 January 1991 (aged 33)	7	(Ireland) Connacht
Rob Herring	Hooker	27 April 1990 (aged 34)	40	(Ireland) Ulster
Rónan Kelleher	Hooker	24 January 1998 (aged 26)	33	(Ireland) Leinster
Dan Sheehan	Hooker	17 September 1998 (aged 25)	27	(Ireland) Leinster
Finlay Bealham	Prop	9 October 1991 (aged 32)	42	(Ireland) Connacht
Tadhg Furlong	Prop	14 November 1992 (aged 31)	78	(Ireland) Leinster
Cian Healy	Prop	7 October 1987 (aged 36)	131	(Ireland) Leinster
Oli Jager	Prop	5 July 1995 (aged 29)	1	(Ireland) Munster
Tom O'Toole	Prop	23 September 1998 (aged 25)	13	(Ireland) Ulster
Andrew Porter	Prop	16 January 1996 (aged 28)	66	(Ireland) Leinster
Ryan Baird	Lock	26 July 1999 (aged 24)	22	(Ireland) Leinster
Tadhg Beirne	Lock	8 January 1992 (aged 32)	52	(Ireland) Munster
Cormac Izuchukwu	Lock	28 January 2000 (aged 24)	0	(Ireland) Ulster
Joe McCarthy	Lock	26 March 2001 (aged 23)	12	(Ireland) Leinster
James Ryan	Lock	24 July 1996 (aged 27)	64	(Ireland) Leinster
Caelan Doris	Back row	2 April 1998 (aged 26)	43	(Ireland) Leinster
Peter O'Mahony (c)	Back row	17 September 1989 (aged 34)	107	(Ireland) Munster
Cian Prendergast	Back row	23 February 2000 (aged 24)	3	(Ireland) Connacht
Nick Timoney	Back row	1 August 1995 (aged 28)	3	(Ireland) Ulster
Josh van der Flier	Back row	25 April 1993 (aged 31)	64	(Ireland) Leinster
Caolin Blade	Scrum-half	29 April 1994 (aged 30)	3	(Ireland) Connacht
Craig Casey	Scrum-half	19 April 1999 (aged 25)	15	(Ireland) Munster
Nathan Doak	Scrum-half	17 December 2001 (aged 22)	0	(Ireland) Ulster
Conor Murray	Scrum-half	20 April 1989 (aged 35)	118	(Ireland) Munster
Jack Crowley	Fly-half	13 January 2000 (aged 24)	16	(Ireland) Munster
Sam Prendergast	Fly-half	12 February 2003 (aged 21)	0	(Ireland) Leinster
Bundee Aki	Centre	7 April 1990 (aged 34)	57	(Ireland) Connacht
Robbie Henshaw	Centre	12 June 1993 (aged 31)	74	(Ireland) Leinster
Stuart McCloskey	Centre	6 August 1992 (aged 31)	18	(Ireland) Ulster
Jamie Osborne	Centre	16 November 2001 (aged 22)	2	(Ireland) Leinster
Garry Ringrose	Centre	26 January 1995 (aged 29)	60	(Ireland) Leinster
Jordan Larmour	Wing	10 June 1997 (aged 27)	32	(Ireland) Leinster
James Lowe	Wing	8 July 1992 (aged 31)	33	(Ireland) Leinster
Calvin Nash	Wing	8 August 1997 (aged 26)	8	(Ireland) Munster
Jacob Stockdale	Wing	3 April 1996 (aged 28)	37	(Ireland) Ulster
Ciarán Frawley	Fullback	4 December 1997 (aged 26)	6	(Ireland) Leinster
Jimmy O'Brien	Fullback	27 November 1996 (aged 27)	8	(Ireland) Leinster

=== South Africa ===
On 25 June 2024, South Africa head coach Rassie Erasmus named a 39-player squad for their incoming test series, with matches against Ireland and Portugal.

Ages, caps and clubs are as of 6 July 2024, the date of the first test.

Player	Position	Date of birth (age)	Caps	Club/province
Johan Grobbelaar	Hooker	30 December 1997 (aged 26)	0	(South Africa) Bulls
Malcolm Marx	Hooker	13 July 1994 (aged 29)	65	(Japan) Kubota Spears
Bongi Mbonambi	Hooker	7 January 1991 (aged 33)	69	(South Africa) Sharks
Jan-Hendrik Wessels	Hooker	8 May 2001 (aged 23)	0	(South Africa) Bulls
Thomas du Toit	Prop	3 May 1995 (aged 29)	18	(England) Bath
Vincent Koch	Prop	13 March 1990 (aged 34)	50	(South Africa) Sharks
Frans Malherbe	Prop	14 March 1991 (aged 33)	70	(South Africa) Stormers
Ox Nché	Prop	23 July 1995 (aged 28)	29	(South Africa) Sharks
Trevor Nyakane	Prop	4 May 1989 (aged 35)	67	(South Africa) Sharks
Gerhard Steenekamp	Prop	9 April 1997 (aged 27)	1	(South Africa) Bulls
Ben-Jason Dixon	Lock	29 April 1998 (aged 26)	1	(South Africa) Stormers
Eben Etzebeth	Lock	29 October 1991 (aged 32)	120	(South Africa) Sharks
Salmaan Moerat	Lock	6 March 1998 (aged 26)	3	(South Africa) Stormers
Franco Mostert	Lock	27 November 1990 (aged 33)	74	(Japan) Mie Honda Heat
RG Snyman	Lock	29 January 1995 (aged 29)	34	(Ireland) Leinster
Phepsi Buthelezi	Back row	30 May 1999 (aged 25)	0	(South Africa) Sharks
Pieter-Steph du Toit	Back row	20 August 1992 (aged 31)	77	(Japan) Toyota Verblitz
Siya Kolisi (c)	Back row	16 June 1991 (aged 33)	83	(France) Racing 92
Evan Roos	Back row	21 January 2000 (aged 24)	6	(South Africa) Stormers
Kwagga Smith	Back row	11 June 1993 (aged 31)	41	(Japan) Shizuoka Blue Revs
Marco van Staden	Back row	25 August 1995 (aged 28)	18	(South Africa) Bulls
Jasper Wiese	Back row	21 October 1995 (aged 28)	27	(Japan) Urayasu D-Rocks
Faf de Klerk	Scrum-half	19 October 1991 (aged 32)	56	(Japan) Yokohama Canon Eagles
Cobus Reinach	Scrum-half	7 February 1990 (aged 34)	32	(France) Montpellier
Morné van den Berg	Scrum-half	24 October 1997 (aged 26)	0	(South Africa) Lions
Grant Williams	Scrum-half	2 July 1996 (aged 28)	9	(South Africa) Sharks
Sacha Feinberg-Mngomezulu	Fly-half	22 February 2002 (aged 22)	1	(South Africa) Stormers
Manie Libbok	Fly-half	15 July 1997 (aged 26)	14	(South Africa) Stormers
Handré Pollard	Fly-half	11 March 1994 (aged 30)	69	(England) Leicester Tigers
Lukhanyo Am	Centre	28 November 1993 (aged 30)	35	(South Africa) Sharks
Damian de Allende	Centre	25 November 1991 (aged 32)	79	(Japan) Saitama Wild Knights
André Esterhuizen	Centre	30 March 1994 (aged 30)	17	(South Africa) Sharks
Jesse Kriel	Centre	15 February 1994 (aged 30)	69	(Japan) Yokohama Canon Eagles
Kurt-Lee Arendse	Wing	17 June 1996 (aged 28)	15	(South Africa) Bulls
Cheslin Kolbe	Wing	28 October 1993 (aged 30)	31	(Japan) Suntory Sungoliath
Makazole Mapimpi	Wing	26 July 1990 (aged 33)	42	(South Africa) Sharks
Edwill van der Merwe	Wing	12 April 1996 (aged 28)	1	(South Africa) Lions
Aphelele Fassi	Fullback	23 January 1998 (aged 26)	3	(South Africa) Sharks
Willie le Roux	Fullback	18 August 1989 (aged 34)	93	(South Africa) Bulls

== Matches ==
=== South Africa vs Ireland (1st test) ===
6 July 2024
17:00 SAST (UTC+02)

South Africa	27–20	Ireland
Try: Arendse 2' c Kolbe 64' c Penalty try 77'; Con: Pollard (2/2) 3', 66'; Pen: Pollard (2/5) 17', 28'	Report	Try: Osborne 34' m Murray 74' c Baird 78' c Con: Crowley (1/3) 75'; Pen: Crowley (1/2) 12'

Loftus Versfeld Stadium, Pretoria
Attendance: 50,066
Referee: Luke Pearce (England)

FB	15	Willie le Roux
RW	14	Cheslin Kolbe
OC	13	Jesse Kriel
IC	12	Damian de Allende
LW	11	Kurt-Lee Arendse	(yellow card) 74'
FH	10	Handré Pollard		(substituted off) 73'
SH	9	Faf de Klerk		(substituted off) 59'
N8	8	Kwagga Smith
BF	7	Pieter-Steph du Toit
OF	6	Siya Kolisi (c)		(substituted off) 49'
RL	5	Franco Mostert		(substituted off) 49'
LL	4	Eben Etzebeth		(substituted off) 49'
TP	3	Frans Malherbe		(substituted off) 49'
HK	2	Bongi Mbonambi		(substituted off) 49'
LP	1	Ox Nché		(substituted off) 49'
Substitutions:
HK	16	Malcolm Marx		(substituted on) 49'
PR	17	Gerhard Steenekamp		(substituted on) 49'
PR	18	Vincent Koch		(substituted on) 49'
LK	19	Salmaan Moerat		(substituted on) 49'
LK	20	RG Snyman		(substituted on) 49'
FL	21	Marco van Staden		(substituted on) 49'
SH	22	Grant Williams		(substituted on) 59'
FH	23	Sacha Feinberg-Mngomezulu		(substituted on) 73'
Coach:
(South Africa) Rassie Erasmus

FB	15	Jamie Osborne		(substituted off) 50'
RW	14	Calvin Nash
OC	13	Robbie Henshaw		(substituted off) 41'
IC	12	Bundee Aki
LW	11	James Lowe
FH	10	Jack Crowley
SH	9	Craig Casey		(substituted off) 63'
N8	8	Caelan Doris
OF	7	Josh van der Flier
BF	6	Peter O'Mahony (c)		(substituted off) 49'
RL	5	Tadhg Beirne
LL	4	Joe McCarthy		(substituted off) 49'
TP	3	Tadhg Furlong		(substituted off) 62'
HK	2	Dan Sheehan		(substituted off) 41'
LP	1	Andrew Porter		(substituted off) 73'
Replacements:
HK	16	Rónan Kelleher	(yellow card) 77'	(substituted on) 41'
PR	17	Cian Healy		(substituted on) 73'
PR	18	Finlay Bealham		(substituted on) 62'
LK	19	James Ryan		(substituted on) 49'
LK	20	Ryan Baird		(substituted on) 49'
SH	21	Conor Murray		(substituted on) 63'
FH	22	Ciarán Frawley		(substituted on) 50'
CE	23	Garry Ringrose		(substituted on) 41'
Coach:
(England) Andy Farrell

Player of the Match:
Pieter-Steph du Toit (South Africa)
Assistant referees:
Karl Dickson (England)
Mike Adamson (Scotland)
Television match official:
Ben Whitehouse (Wales)
Foul play review officer:
Ian Tempest (England)

Notes:

- Jamie Osborne (Ireland) made his international debut.
- This was South Africa's first victory over Ireland since 2016.

=== South Africa vs Ireland (2nd test) ===
13 July 2024
17:00 SAST (UTC+02)

South Africa	24–25	Ireland
Pen: Pollard (8/8) 18', 34', 44', 47', 52', 56', 60', 64'	Report	Try: Murray 13' c Con: Crowley (1/1) 14'; Pen: Crowley (4/4) 5', 37', 40+1', 58'; Drop: Frawley (2/2) 69', 80'

Kings Park Stadium, Durban
Attendance: 52,000
Referee: Karl Dickson (England)

FB	15	Willie le Roux	(substituted off) 2'
RW	14	Cheslin Kolbe
OC	13	Jesse Kriel
IC	12	Damian de Allende
LW	11	Kurt-Lee Arendse
FH	10	Handré Pollard
SH	9	Faf de Klerk	(substituted off) 44'
N8	8	Kwagga Smith
BF	7	Pieter-Steph du Toit
OF	6	Siya Kolisi (c)	(substituted off) 50'
RL	5	Franco Mostert		(substituted off) 16'
LL	4	Eben Etzebeth	8' to 16'		(substituted off) 71'	(substituted on) 73'
TP	3	Frans Malherbe	(substituted off) 45'
HK	2	Bongi Mbonambi	(substituted off) 45'
LP	1	Ox Nché	(substituted off) 56'
Substitutions:
HK	16	Malcolm Marx	(substituted on) 45'
PR	17	Gerhard Steenekamp	(substituted on) 56'
PR	18	Vincent Koch	(substituted on) 45'
LK	19	Salmaan Moerat			(substituted on) 71'	(substituted off) 73'
LK	20	RG Snyman	(substituted on) 8'
FL	21	Marco van Staden	(substituted on) 50'
SH	22	Grant Williams	(substituted on) 44'
FH	23	Sacha Feinberg-Mngomezulu	(substituted on) 2'
Coach:
(South Africa) Rassie Erasmus

FB	15	Jamie Osborne
RW	14	Calvin Nash		(substituted off) 61'
OC	13	Garry Ringrose
IC	12	Robbie Henshaw
LW	11	James Lowe
FH	10	Jack Crowley		(substituted off) 59'
SH	9	Conor Murray		(substituted off) 59'
N8	8	Caelan Doris (c)	(yellow card) 46'
OF	7	Josh van der Flier		(substituted off) 56'
BF	6	Tadhg Beirne
RL	5	James Ryan		(substituted off) 56'
LL	4	Joe McCarthy
TP	3	Tadhg Furlong		(substituted off) 44'
HK	2	Rónan Kelleher		(substituted off) 65'
LP	1	Andrew Porter		(substituted off) 56'
Replacements:
HK	16	Rob Herring		(substituted on) 65'
PR	17	Cian Healy		(substituted on) 56'
PR	18	Finlay Bealham		(substituted on) 44'
LK	19	Ryan Baird		(substituted on) 56'
FL	20	Peter O'Mahony		(substituted on) 56'
SH	21	Caolin Blade		(substituted on) 59'
FH	22	Ciarán Frawley		(substituted on) 59'
CE	23	Stuart McCloskey		(substituted on) 61'
Coach:
(England) Andy Farrell

Player of the Match:
Ox Nché (South Africa)
Assistant referees:
Luke Pearce (England)
Craig Evans (Wales)
Television match official:
Ian Tempest (England)
Foul play review officer:
Ben Whitehouse (Wales)

== See also ==
- 2024 mid-year rugby union tests
- 2024 England rugby union tour of New Zealand
- 2024 France rugby union tour of Argentina and Uruguay
- 2024 Wales rugby union tour of Australia
