= 2024 Rugby Championship =

Southern Hemisphere rugby union competition

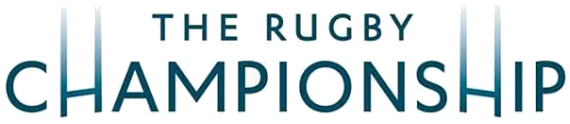
- Date: 10 August – 28 September 2024
- Countries: Argentina; Australia; New Zealand; South Africa

Final positions
- Champions: South Africa (5th title)
- Bledisloe Cup: New Zealand
- Freedom Cup: South Africa
- Mandela Challenge Plate: South Africa
- Puma Trophy: Argentina

Tournament statistics
- Matches played: 12
- Tries scored: 77 (6.42 per match)
- Attendance: 531,010 (44,251 per match)
- Top scorer(s): (New Zealand) Damian McKenzie (62)
- Most tries: (New Zealand) Caleb Clarke (6)

The 2024 Rugby Championship (Note: The competition is known as the Lipovitan-D Rugby Championship in New Zealand, the Castle Lager Rugby Championship in South Africa, the Flight Centre Rugby Championship in Australia, and the Visa/Banco Macro Rugby Championship in Argentina for sponsorship reasons.) was the thirteenth edition of the annual Southern Hemisphere rugby union competition, involving Argentina, Australia, New Zealand and South Africa. New Zealand was the defending champion.

On 28 September, South Africa won the championship for the first time since 2019 after a 48–7 win against Argentina.

== Table ==
Pos	Team	Pld	W	D	L	PF	PA	PD	TF	TA	TB	LB	Pts
1	South Africa	6	5	0	1	188	94	+94	24	10	3	1	24
2	New Zealand	6	3	0	3	175	138	+37	22	15	2	2	16
3	Argentina	6	3	0	3	170	195	−25	20	24	1	1	14
4	Australia	6	1	0	5	107	213	−106	11	28	0	1	5

Source: SANZAAR

== Fixtures ==
=== Round 1 ===
10 August 2024
14:45 AEST (UTC+10)

Australia	7–33	South Africa (1 BP)
Try: Paisami 76' c Con: Lynagh (1/1) 77'	Report	Try: Kolisi 10' c Du Toit 24' c Arendse (2) 35' c, 64' m Smith 62' c Con: Feinberg-Mngomezulu (4/5) 11', 25', 36', 63'

Suncorp Stadium, Brisbane
Attendance: 52,019
Referee: Luke Pearce (England)

FB	15	Tom Wright
RW	14	Andrew Kellaway	(yellow card) 30'
OC	13	Len Ikitau
IC	12	Hunter Paisami
LW	11	Filipo Daugunu		(substituted off) 26'
FH	10	Noah Lolesio		(substituted off) 63'
SH	9	Jake Gordon		(substituted off) 59'
N8	8	Harry Wilson
OF	7	Carlo Tizzano		(substituted off) 63'		(substituted on) 68'
BF	6	Rob Valetini
RL	5	Lukhan Salakaia-Loto			(substituted off) 65'	(substituted on) 67'
LL	4	Nick Frost		(substituted off) 55'	(substituted on) 65'	(substituted off) 68'
TP	3	Allan Alaalatoa (c)		(substituted off) 59'
HK	2	Matt Faessler		(substituted off) 41'
LP	1	Isaac Aedo Kailea		(substituted off) 41'
Replacements:
HK	16	Josh Nasser		(substituted on) 41'
PR	17	James Slipper		(substituted on) 41'
PR	18	Zane Nonggorr		(substituted on) 59'
LK	19	Jeremy Williams		(substituted on) 55'		(substituted off) 67'
FL	20	Luke Reimer		(substituted on) 63'
SH	21	Tate McDermott		(substituted on) 59'
FH	22	Tom Lynagh		(substituted on) 63'
WG	23	Dylan Pietsch		(substituted on) 26'
Coach:
Joe Schmidt

FB	15	Willie le Roux
RW	14	Cheslin Kolbe
OC	13	Jesse Kriel	(yellow card) 79'
IC	12	Damian de Allende		(substituted off) 65'
LW	11	Kurt-Lee Arendse
FH	10	Sacha Feinberg-Mngomezulu			(substituted off) 73'	(substituted on) 78'
SH	9	Cobus Reinach		(substituted off) 52'
N8	8	Elrigh Louw		(substituted off) 57'
BF	7	Ben-Jason Dixon
OF	6	Siya Kolisi (c)		(substituted off) 57'
RL	5	Pieter-Steph du Toit
LL	4	Eben Etzebeth		(substituted off) 54'
TP	3	Frans Malherbe		(substituted off) 54'
HK	2	Bongi Mbonambi		(substituted off) 28'	(substituted on) 73'	(substituted off) 78'
LP	1	Ox Nché		(substituted off) 54'
Substitutions:
HK	16	Malcolm Marx	(yellow card) 67'	(substituted on) 28'
PR	17	Gerhard Steenekamp		(substituted on) 54'
PR	18	Vincent Koch		(substituted on) 54'
LK	19	Salmaan Moerat		(substituted on) 54'
FL	20	Marco van Staden	(yellow card) 72'	(substituted on) 57'
N8	21	Kwagga Smith		(substituted on) 57'
SH	22	Grant Williams		(substituted on) 52'
FH	23	Handré Pollard		(substituted on) 65'
Coach:
Rassie Erasmus

Assistant referees:
Paul Williams (New Zealand)
Hollie Davidson (Scotland)
Television match official:
Ben Whitehouse (Wales)
Foul play review officer:
Richard Kelly (New Zealand)

Notes:

- Carlo Tizzano and Luke Reimer (both Australia) made their international debuts.
- RG Snyman was initially named at lock in the South Africa team, but was forced to withdraw due to injury. He was replaced by Pieter-Steph du Toit, with Ben-Jason Dixon replacing du Toit at blindside flanker and Salmaan Moerat taking Dixon's place among the substitutes.
- South Africa retained the Mandela Challenge Plate.

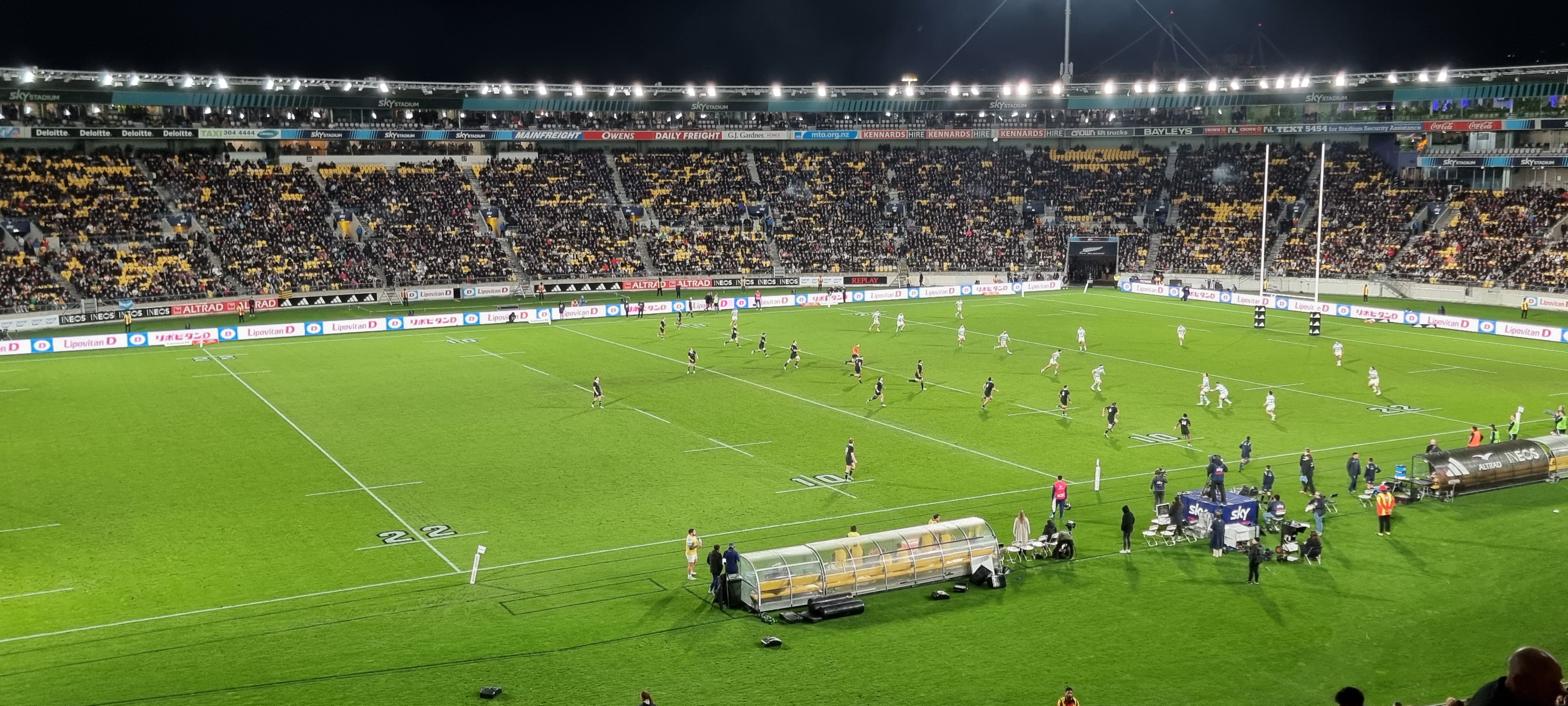
Round 1 match between the All Blacks and Argentina at Sky Stadium, Wellington, on 10 August 2024

10 August 2024
19:05 NZST (UTC+12)

New Zealand	30–38	Argentina
Try: Darry 15' c Lienert-Brown 35' c Tele'a 52' c Con: McKenzie (3/3) 16', 36', 53'; Pen: McKenzie (3/4) 12', 27', 47'	Report	Try: Cinti 23' m M. Carreras 38' c Molina 43' c Creevy 69' c Con: S. Carreras (3/4) 39', 44', 70'; Pen: S. Carreras (4/4) 31', 50', 56', 79'

Sky Stadium, Wellington
Attendance: 25,000
Referee: Angus Gardner (Australia)

FB	15	Beauden Barrett
RW	14	Sevu Reece	(substituted off) 50'
OC	13	Anton Lienert-Brown	(substituted off) 65'
IC	12	Jordie Barrett
LW	11	Mark Tele'a
FH	10	Damian McKenzie
SH	9	TJ Perenara	(substituted off) 57'
N8	8	Ardie Savea (c)
OF	7	Dalton Papali'i	(substituted off) 65'
BF	6	Ethan Blackadder
RL	5	Sam Darry	(substituted off) 71'
LL	4	Tupou Vaa'i
TP	3	Tyrel Lomax	(substituted off) 59'
HK	2	Codie Taylor	(substituted off) 65'
LP	1	Ethan de Groot	(substituted off) 59'
Substitutions:
HK	16	Asafo Aumua	(substituted on) 65'
PR	17	Ofa Tuʻungafasi	(substituted on) 59'
PR	18	Fletcher Newell	(substituted on) 59'
LK	19	Josh Lord	(substituted on) 71'
FL	20	Wallace Sititi	(substituted on) 65'
SH	21	Cortez Ratima	(substituted on) 57'
CE	22	Rieko Ioane	(substituted on) 65'
FB	23	Will Jordan	(substituted on) 50'
Coach:
Scott Robertson

FB	15	Juan Cruz Mallía
RW	14	Matías Moroni
OC	13	Lucio Cinti	(substituted off) 64'
IC	12	Santiago Chocobares
LW	11	Mateo Carreras
FH	10	Santiago Carreras
SH	9	Gonzalo Bertranou
N8	8	Juan Martín González	(substituted off) 67'
OF	7	Marcos Kremer
BF	6	Pablo Matera (c)
RL	5	Pedro Rubiolo	(substituted off) 63'
LL	4	Franco Molina	(substituted off) 47'
TP	3	Eduardo Bello	(substituted off) 47'
HK	2	Ignacio Ruiz	(substituted off) 63'
LP	1	Thomas Gallo	(substituted off) 63'
Substitutions:
HK	16	Agustín Creevy	(substituted on) 63'
PR	17	Mayco Vivas	(substituted on) 63'
PR	18	Joel Sclavi	(substituted on) 47'
LK	19	Efraín Elías	(substituted on) 47'
LK	20	Tomás Lavanini	(substituted on) 63'
N8	21	Joaquín Oviedo	(substituted on) 67'
SH	22	Lautaro Bazán
FH	23	Tomás Albornoz	(substituted on) 64'
Coach:
Felipe Contepomi

Assistant referees:
Nic Berry (Australia)
Andrea Piardi (Italy)
Television match official:
Brett Cronan (Australia)
Foul play review officer:
Marius Jonker (South Africa)

Notes:

- Efraín Elías (Argentina) made his international debut.
- Argentina scored their most points against New Zealand, surpassing the 25 points scored in 2022.
- New Zealand conceded their most points in a home test match since conceding 36 against South Africa in 2018.

=== Round 2 ===
17 August 2024
19:05 NZST (UTC+12)

(1 BP) New Zealand	42–10	Argentina
Try: McKenzie 6' c Savea 17' c Clarke 24' c Jordan (2) 30' c, 42' c B. Barrett 36' c Con: McKenzie (6/6) 7', 18', 25', 31', 37', 43'	Report	Try: Mallía 72' c Con: Albornoz (1/1) 72'; Pen: S. Carreras (1/1) 12'

Eden Park, Auckland
Attendance: 48,000
Referee: Andrea Piardi (Italy)

FB	15	Beauden Barrett
RW	14	Will Jordan
OC	13	Rieko Ioane			(substituted off) 77'
IC	12	Jordie Barrett
LW	11	Caleb Clarke		(substituted off) 60'
FH	10	Damian McKenzie		(substituted off) 51'
SH	9	TJ Perenara		(substituted off) 51'
N8	8	Ardie Savea (c)
OF	7	Dalton Papali'i		(substituted off) 51'
BF	6	Ethan Blackadder
RL	5	Sam Darry		(substituted off) 55'
LL	4	Tupou Vaa'i
TP	3	Tyrel Lomax		(substituted off) 51'
HK	2	Codie Taylor		(substituted off) 51'	(substituted on) 77'
LP	1	Tamaiti Williams		(substituted off) 53'
Substitutions:
HK	16	Asafo Aumua	(yellow card) 76'	(substituted on) 51'
PR	17	Ofa Tuʻungafasi		(substituted on) 53'
PR	18	Fletcher Newell		(substituted on) 51'
LK	19	Josh Lord		(substituted on) 55'
FL	20	Sam Cane		(substituted on) 51'
SH	21	Cortez Ratima		(substituted on) 51'
CE	22	Anton Lienert-Brown		(substituted on) 60'
WG	23	Mark Tele'a		(substituted on) 51'
Coach:
Scott Robertson

FB	15	Juan Cruz Mallía
RW	14	Matías Moroni	(substituted off) 43'
OC	13	Lucio Cinti
IC	12	Santiago Chocobares
LW	11	Mateo Carreras		(substituted off) 77'
FH	10	Santiago Carreras	(substituted off) 43'	(substituted on) 77'
SH	9	Gonzalo Bertranou	(substituted off) 43'
N8	8	Joaquín Oviedo
OF	7	Juan Martín González
BF	6	Pablo Matera	(substituted off) 51'
RL	5	Pedro Rubiolo	(substituted off) 60'
LL	4	Marcos Kremer
TP	3	Lucio Sordoni	(substituted off) 51'
HK	2	Julián Montoya (c)	(substituted off) 60'
LP	1	Thomas Gallo	(substituted off) 60'
Substitutions:
HK	16	Ignacio Ruiz	(substituted on) 60'
PR	17	Mayco Vivas	(substituted on) 60'
PR	18	Joel Sclavi	(substituted on) 51'
LK	19	Franco Molina	(substituted on) 51'
LK	20	Tomás Lavanini	(substituted on) 60'
SH	21	Lautaro Bazán	(substituted on) 43'
FH	22	Tomás Albornoz	(substituted on) 43'
WG	23	Bautista Delguy	(substituted on) 43'
Coach:
Felipe Contepomi

Assistant referees:
Angus Gardner (Australia)
Nic Berry (Australia)
Television match official:
Marius Jonker (South Africa)
Foul play review officer:
Brett Cronan (Australia)

Notes:

- This was New Zealand's 50th test match without losing at Eden Park.

17 August 2024
19:45 AEST (UTC+10)

Australia	12–30	South Africa (1 BP)
Pen: Lolesio (4/5) 3', 21', 36', 47'	Report	Try: Fassi 17' m Van Staden 43' c Marx (2) 63' m, 73' c Con: Feinberg-Mngomezulu (1/2) 44'; Pollard (1/2) 74'; Pen: Feinberg-Mngomezulu (2/2) 16', 26'

Optus Stadium, Perth
Attendance: 58,197
Referee: Paul Williams (New Zealand)

FB	15	Tom Wright
RW	14	Andrew Kellaway
OC	13	Len Ikitau
IC	12	Hunter Paisami		(substituted off) 48'
LW	11	Marika Koroibete
FH	10	Noah Lolesio		(substituted off) 71'
SH	9	Nic White		(substituted off) 61'
N8	8	Harry Wilson
OF	7	Carlo Tizzano
BF	6	Rob Valetini
RL	5	Lukhan Salakaia-Loto
LL	4	Angus Blyth		(substituted off) 58'
TP	3	Allan Alaalatoa (c)		(substituted off) 41'
HK	2	Josh Nasser		(substituted off) 55'
LP	1	Angus Bell		(substituted off) 41'
Replacements:
HK	16	Billy Pollard		(substituted on) 49'
PR	17	James Slipper		(substituted on) 41'	(substituted off) 49'
PR	18	Zane Nonggorr		(substituted on) 41'
LK	19	Tom Hooper		(substituted on) 58'
N8	20	Seru Uru	(yellow card) 72'	(substituted on) 55'
SH	21	Tate McDermott		(substituted on) 61'
FH	22	Ben Donaldson		(substituted on) 71'
FB	23	Max Jorgensen		(substituted on) 48'
Coach:
Joe Schmidt

FB	15	Aphelele Fassi
RW	14	Cheslin Kolbe
OC	13	Jesse Kriel
IC	12	Lukhanyo Am	(substituted off) 71'
LW	11	Makazole Mapimpi
FH	10	Sacha Feinberg-Mngomezulu	(substituted off) 60'
SH	9	Morné van den Berg	(substituted off) 50'
N8	8	Elrigh Louw	(substituted off) 58'
BF	7	Pieter-Steph du Toit
OF	6	Marco van Staden
RL	5	Ruan Nortjé
LL	4	Salmaan Moerat (c)	(substituted off) 17'
TP	3	Thomas du Toit	(substituted off) 51'
HK	2	Johan Grobbelaar	(substituted off) 45'
LP	1	Jan-Hendrik Wessels	(substituted off) 45'
Substitutions:
HK	16	Malcolm Marx	(substituted on) 45'
PR	17	Ox Nché	(substituted on) 45'
PR	18	Vincent Koch	(substituted on) 51'
LK	19	Eben Etzebeth	(substituted on) 17'
FL	20	Kwagga Smith	(substituted on) 58'
SH	21	Grant Williams	(substituted on) 50'
FH	22	Manie Libbok	(substituted on) 71'
FH	23	Handré Pollard	(substituted on) 60'
Coach:
Rassie Erasmus

Assistant referees:
Luke Pearce (England)
Hollie Davidson (Scotland)
Television match official:
Richard Kelly (New Zealand)
Foul play review officer:
Ben Whitehouse (Wales)

Notes:

- Seru Uru and Max Jorgensen (both (Australia)) made their international debuts.

=== Round 3 ===
31 August 2024
17:00 SAST (UTC+02)

South Africa	31–27	New Zealand (1 BP)
Try: Mbonambi 16' m Smith 68' c Williams 74' c Con: Feinberg-Mngomezulu (2/3) 69', 75'; Pen: Feinberg-Mngomezulu (4/5) 29', 36', 45', 49'	Report	Try: Taylor 6' c Clarke (2) 32' m, 51' m J. Barrett 41'; Con: McKenzie (2/4) 7', 41'; Pen: McKenzie (1/1) 47'

Ellis Park Stadium, Johannesburg
Attendance: 62,000
Referee: Andrew Brace (Ireland)

FB	15	Aphelele Fassi	(yellow card) 6'
RW	14	Cheslin Kolbe
OC	13	Jesse Kriel
IC	12	Damian de Allende
LW	11	Kurt-Lee Arendse		(substituted off) 49'
FH	10	Sacha Feinberg-Mngomezulu
SH	9	Cobus Reinach		(substituted off) 44'
N8	8	Jasper Wiese		(substituted off) 44'
BF	7	Ben-Jason Dixon			(substituted off) 38'
OF	6	Siya Kolisi (c)					(substituted off) 61'
RL	5	Ruan Nortjé		(substituted off) 26'	(substituted on) 38'	(substituted off) 51'	(substituted on) 61'
LL	4	Pieter-Steph du Toit
TP	3	Frans Malherbe		(substituted off) 44'
HK	2	Bongi Mbonambi		(substituted off) 44'
LP	1	Ox Nché		(substituted off) 44'
Substitutions:
HK	16	Malcolm Marx		(substituted on) 44'
PR	17	Gerhard Steenekamp		(substituted on) 44'
PR	18	Vincent Koch		(substituted on) 44'
LK	19	Eben Etzebeth		(substituted on) 26'
FL	20	Elrigh Louw		(substituted on) 44'
FL	21	Kwagga Smith				(substituted on) 51'
SH	22	Grant Williams		(substituted on) 44'
FH	23	Handré Pollard		(substituted on) 49'
Coach:
Rassie Erasmus

FB	15	Beauden Barrett
RW	14	Will Jordan		(substituted off) 66'
OC	13	Rieko Ioane
IC	12	Jordie Barrett
LW	11	Caleb Clarke		(substituted off) 64'
FH	10	Damian McKenzie
SH	9	TJ Perenara		(substituted off) 66'
N8	8	Ardie Savea
BF	7	Sam Cane
OF	6	Ethan Blackadder		(substituted off) 70'
RL	5	Tupou Vaa'i		(substituted off) 70'
LL	4	Scott Barrett (c)
TP	3	Tyrel Lomax		(substituted off) 59'
HK	2	Codie Taylor		(substituted off) 66'
LP	1	Tamaiti Williams		(substituted off) 56'
Substitutions:
HK	16	Asafo Aumua		(substituted on) 66'
PR	17	Ofa Tuʻungafasi	(yellow card) 68'	(substituted on) 56'
PR	18	Fletcher Newell		(substituted on) 59'
LK	19	Sam Darry		(substituted on) 70'
FL	20	Samipeni Finau		(substituted on) 70'
FH	21	Cortez Ratima		(substituted on) 66'
CE	22	Anton Lienert-Brown		(substituted on) 64'
WG	23	Mark Tele'a		(substituted on) 66'
Coach:
Scott Robertson

Assistant referees:
Matthew Carley (England)
Jordan Way (Australia)
Television match official:
Brian MacNeice (Ireland)
Foul play review officer:
Ian Tempest (England)

Notes:

- South Africa win 3 consecutive matches against New Zealand for the first time since 2009.

31 August 2024
19:00 ART (UTC−03)

(1 BP) Argentina	19–20	Australia
Try: González 15' c Con: S. Carreras (1/1) 16'; Pen: S. Carreras (3/3) 12', 35', 45'; Albornoz (1/1) 70'	Report	Try: Gordon 28' c Valetini 50' c Con: Lolesio (2/2) 28', 51'; Pen: Lolesio (1/2) 59'; Donaldson (1/1) 80+1'

Estadio Jorge Luis Hirschi, La Plata
Attendance: 28,000
Referee: James Doleman (New Zealand)

FB	15	Juan Cruz Mallía
RW	14	Santiago Cordero	(substituted off) 62'
OC	13	Lucio Cinti
IC	12	Santiago Chocobares
LW	11	Mateo Carreras
FH	10	Santiago Carreras	(substituted off) 73'
SH	9	Gonzalo Bertranou	(substituted off) 62'
N8	8	Juan Martín González	(substituted off) 51'	(substituted on) 62'
OF	7	Marcos Kremer
BF	6	Pablo Matera
RL	5	Pedro Rubiolo	(substituted off) 2'
LL	4	Franco Molina	(substituted off) 45'
TP	3	Joel Sclavi	(substituted off) 45'
HK	2	Julián Montoya (c)
LP	1	Thomas Gallo	(substituted off) 70'
Substitutions:
HK	16	Agustín Creevy	(substituted on) 73'
PR	17	Mayco Vivas	(substituted on) 70'
PR	18	Eduardo Bello	(substituted on) 45'
LK	19	Guido Petti	(substituted on) 45'
LK	20	Tomás Lavanini	(substituted on) 2'	(substituted off) 62'
N8	21	Santiago Grondona	(substituted on) 51'
SH	22	Lautaro Bazán	(substituted on) 62'
FH	23	Tomás Albornoz	(substituted on) 62'
Coach:
Felipe Contepomi

FB	15	Tom Wright
RW	14	Andrew Kellaway	(substituted off) 67'
OC	13	Len Ikitau
IC	12	Hamish Stewart
LW	11	Marika Koroibete
FH	10	Noah Lolesio	(substituted off) 76'
SH	9	Jake Gordon	(substituted off) 67'
N8	8	Harry Wilson (c)
OF	7	Carlo Tizzano	(substituted off) 74'
BF	6	Rob Valetini
RL	5	Lukhan Salakaia-Loto	(substituted off) 48'
LL	4	Nick Frost
TP	3	Taniela Tupou	(substituted off) 48'
HK	2	Matt Faessler	(substituted off) 65'
LP	1	Angus Bell	(substituted off) 56'	(substituted on) 74'
Replacements:
HK	16	Josh Nasser	(substituted on) 65'
PR	17	Isaac Aedo Kailea	(substituted on) 56'	(substituted off) 74'
PR	18	Allan Alaalatoa	(substituted on) 48'
LK	19	Jeremy Williams	(substituted on) 48'
FL	20	Langi Gleeson	(substituted on) 74'
SH	21	Tate McDermott	(substituted on) 67'
FH	22	Ben Donaldson	(substituted on) 76'
WG	23	Max Jorgensen	(substituted on) 67'
Coach:
Joe Schmidt

Assistant referees:
Ben O'Keeffe (New Zealand)
Pierre Brousset (France)
Television match official:
Glenn Newman (New Zealand)
Foul play review officer:
Marius van der Westhuizen (South Africa)

Notes:

- Hamish Stewart ((Australia)) made his international debut.

=== Round 4 ===
7 September 2024
17:00 SAST (UTC+02)

South Africa	18–12	New Zealand (1 BP)
Try: Kolisi 49' c Marx 74' m Con: Pollard (1/1) 50'; Pen: Pollard (1/1) 32'; Feinberg-Mngomezulu (1/2) 54'	Report	Pen: McKenzie (4/7) 15', 29', 40+1', 59'

Cape Town Stadium, Cape Town
Attendance: 57,733
Referee: Matthew Carley (England)

FB	15	Willie le Roux	(yellow card) 62'
RW	14	Canan Moodie		(substituted off) 46'
OC	13	Jesse Kriel
IC	12	Damian de Allende
LW	11	Cheslin Kolbe
FH	10	Handré Pollard		(substituted off) 53'
SH	9	Grant Williams		(substituted off) 60'
N8	8	Jasper Wiese	(yellow card) 14'	(substituted off) 53'
BF	7	Pieter-Steph du Toit
OF	6	Siya Kolisi (c)		(substituted off) 56'
RL	5	Ruan Nortjé
LL	4	Eben Etzebeth
TP	3	Frans Malherbe		(substituted off) 53'
HK	2	Bongi Mbonambi		(substituted off) 46'
LP	1	Ox Nché		(substituted off) 54'
Substitutions:
HK	16	Malcolm Marx		(substituted on) 46'
PR	17	Gerhard Steenekamp		(substituted on) 54'
PR	18	Vincent Koch		(substituted on) 53'
FL	19	Kwagga Smith		(substituted on) 56'
FL	20	Elrigh Louw		(substituted on) 53'
SH	21	Jaden Hendrikse		(substituted on) 60'
FH	22	Sacha Feinberg-Mngomezulu		(substituted on) 53'
CE	23	Lukhanyo Am		(substituted on) 46'
Coach:
Rassie Erasmus

FB	15	Will Jordan		(substituted off) 60'
RW	14	Sevu Reece	(yellow card) 16'
OC	13	Rieko Ioane		(substituted off) 76'
IC	12	Jordie Barrett
LW	11	Mark Tele'a		(substituted off) 50'
FH	10	Damian McKenzie
SH	9	Cortez Ratima		(substituted off) 50'
N8	8	Ardie Savea
OF	7	Sam Cane
BF	6	Wallace Sititi		(substituted off) 60'
RL	5	Tupou Vaa'i
LL	4	Scott Barrett (c)
TP	3	Tyrel Lomax	(yellow card) 73'
HK	2	Codie Taylor		(substituted off) 18'	(substituted on) 27'
LP	1	Tamaiti Williams		(substituted off) 78'
Substitutions:
HK	16	Asafo Aumua		(substituted on) 18'	(substituted off) 27'
PR	17	Ofa Tu'ungafasi		(substituted on) 78'
PR	18	Fletcher Newell		(substituted on) 76'
LK	19	Sam Darry
FL	20	Luke Jacobson		(substituted on) 60'
SH	21	TJ Perenara		(substituted on) 50'
CE	22	Anton Lienert-Brown		(substituted on) 50'
FB	23	Beauden Barrett		(substituted on) 60'
Coach:
Scott Robertson

Assistant referees:
Andrew Brace (Ireland)
Jordan Way (Australia)
Television match official:
Ian Tempest (England)
Foul play review officer:
Brian MacNeice (Ireland)

Notes:

- South Africa reclaim the Freedom Cup.
- South Africa records a 4th consecutive victory over New Zealand for the first time since 1949.
- This is South Africa's longest winning streak against New Zealand in the professional era.
- This was the first time since November 2018 (losing to Ireland 16–9) that New Zealand have failed to score a try in a test match.

7 September 2024
16:00 ART (UTC−03)

(1 BP) Argentina	67–27	Australia
Try: M. Carreras 30' c Montoya 36' c González 47' c Matera 56' c Oviedo (2) 63' c, 76' c Mallía (2) 71' m, 74' c Cinti 80' c Con: Albornoz (6/7) 31', 37', 48', 57', 64', 75'; S. Carreras (2/2) 77', 81'; Pen: Albornoz (2/2) 2', 62'	Report	Try: Tizzano 14' c Kellaway 28' c McDermott 68' c Con: Donaldson (2/2) 15', 29'; Lynagh (1/1) 69'; Pen: Donaldson (2/2) 5', 21'

Estadio Brigadier General Estanislao López, Santa Fe
Attendance: 30,000
Referee: Pierre Brousset (France)

FB	15	Juan Cruz Mallía
RW	14	Bautista Delguy	(substituted off) 41'
OC	13	Lucio Cinti
IC	12	Santiago Chocobares
LW	11	Mateo Carreras
FH	10	Tomás Albornoz
SH	9	Gonzalo Bertranou	(substituted off) 71'
N8	8	Juan Martín González
OF	7	Marcos Kremer
BF	6	Pablo Matera	(substituted off) 68'
RL	5	Tomás Lavanini	(substituted off) 47'
LL	4	Guido Petti	(substituted off) 59'
TP	3	Joel Sclavi	(substituted off) 47'	(substituted on) 73'
HK	2	Julián Montoya (c)	(substituted off) 66'
LP	1	Thomas Gallo	(substituted off) 71'
Substitutions:
HK	16	Ignacio Ruiz	(substituted on) 66'
PR	17	Mayco Vivas	(substituted on) 71'
PR	18	Eduardo Bello	(substituted on) 47'	(substituted off) 73'
LK	19	Franco Molina	(substituted on) 59'
FL	20	Joaquín Oviedo	(substituted on) 47'
FL	21	Santiago Grondona	(substituted on) 68'
SH	22	Gonzalo García	(substituted on) 71'
FH	23	Santiago Carreras	(substituted on) 41'
Coach:
Felipe Contepomi

FB	15	Andrew Kellaway	(yellow card) 80'
RW	14	Max Jorgensen
OC	13	Len Ikitau		(substituted off) 66'
IC	12	Hamish Stewart
LW	11	Marika Koroibete
FH	10	Ben Donaldson		(substituted off) 56'
SH	9	Jake Gordon		(substituted off) 56'
N8	8	Harry Wilson (c)
OF	7	Carlo Tizzano
BF	6	Rob Valetini		(substituted off) 59'
RL	5	Jeremy Williams
LL	4	Nick Frost		(substituted off) 66'
TP	3	Taniela Tupou		(substituted off) 36'
HK	2	Matt Faessler		(substituted off) 47'
LP	1	Angus Bell		(substituted off) 41'
Replacements:
HK	16	Josh Nasser		(substituted on) 47'
PR	17	James Slipper		(substituted on) 41'
PR	18	Allan Alaalatoa		(substituted on) 36'
LK	19	Josh Canham		(substituted on) 66'
FL	20	Langi Gleeson		(substituted on) 59'
SH	21	Tate McDermott		(substituted on) 56'
FH	22	Tom Lynagh		(substituted on) 56'
CE	23	Josh Flook		(substituted on) 66'
Coach:
Joe Schmidt

Assistant referees:
Ben O'Keeffe (New Zealand)
James Doleman (New Zealand)
Television match official:
Marius Jonker (South Africa)
Foul play review officer:
Marius van der Westhuizen (South Africa)

Notes:

- Julián Montoya became the fourth Argentine to earn his 100th test cap.
- Josh Canham (Australia) made his international debut.
- James Slipper earned his 139th international cap, equalling George Gregan's record as Australia's most capped player.
- Argentina's 67 points was the most they have scored against Australia, and the 40-point margin is the largest they achieved over Australia, surpassing their previous high of 31 points (48–17) set in 2022.
- This was Australia's record for points conceded in a test match, and their second-largest defeat by margin.
- Argentina retain the Puma Trophy.

=== Round 5 ===
21 September 2024
15:45 AEST (UTC+10)

(1 BP) Australia	28–31	New Zealand
Try: McReight 18' c Faessler 36' c Paisami 65' c Wright 79' c Con: Lolesio (4/4) 19', 37', 66', 79'	Report	Try: Jordan 2' c Ioane 9' c Clarke 15' c Savea 25' c Con: McKenzie (4/4) 3', 10', 16', 26'; Pen: McKenzie (1/1) 45'

Accor Stadium, Sydney
Attendance: 68,061
Referee: Karl Dickson (England)

FB	15	Tom Wright
RW	14	Andrew Kellaway
OC	13	Len Ikitau
IC	12	Hunter Paisami
LW	11	Marika Koroibete	(substituted off) 64'
FH	10	Noah Lolesio
SH	9	Nic White	(substituted off) 62'
N8	8	Harry Wilson (c)
OF	7	Fraser McReight
BF	6	Rob Valetini	(substituted off) 68'
RL	5	Jeremy Williams
LL	4	Nick Frost	(substituted off) 56'
TP	3	Taniela Tupou	(substituted off) 45'
HK	2	Matt Faessler	(substituted off) 53'
LP	1	Angus Bell	(substituted off) 50'	(substituted on) 71'
Substitutions:
HK	16	Brandon Paenga-Amosa	(substituted on) 53'
PR	17	James Slipper	(substituted on) 50'	(substituted off) 71'
PR	18	Allan Alaalatoa	(substituted on) 45'
LK	19	Lukhan Salakaia-Loto	(substituted on) 56'
FL	20	Langi Gleeson	(substituted on) 68'
SH	21	Tate McDermott	(substituted on) 62'
FH	22	Tom Lynagh
WG	23	Dylan Pietsch	(substituted on) 64'
Coach:
Joe Schmidt

FB	15	Will Jordan
RW	14	Sevu Reece		(substituted off) 77'
OC	13	Rieko Ioane
IC	12	Jordie Barrett		(substituted off) 41'
LW	11	Caleb Clarke	(yellow card) 72'
FH	10	Damian McKenzie
SH	9	Cortez Ratima		(substituted off) 58'
N8	8	Ardie Savea
BF	7	Sam Cane		(substituted off) 64'
OF	6	Wallace Sititi
RL	5	Tupou Vaa'i		(substituted off) 66'
LL	4	Scott Barrett (c)
TP	3	Tyrel Lomax		(substituted off) 71'
HK	2	Codie Taylor		(substituted off) 62'
LP	1	Ethan de Groot		(substituted off) 41'
Substitutions:
HK	16	Asafo Aumua		(substituted on) 62'
PR	17	Tamaiti Williams		(substituted on) 41'
PR	18	Pasilio Tosi		(substituted on) 71'
LK	19	Sam Darry		(substituted on) 66'
FL	20	Luke Jacobson		(substituted on) 64'
SH	21	TJ Perenara		(substituted on) 58'
CE	22	Anton Lienert-Brown	(yellow card) 65'	(substituted on) 41'
WG	23	Harry Plummer		(substituted on) 77'
Coach:
Scott Robertson

Assistant referees:
Nika Amashukeli (Georgia)
Damian Schneider (Argentina)
Television match official:
Stuart Terheege (England)
Foul play review officer:
Eric Gauzins (France)

Notes

- Beauden Barrett was initially named at full-back in the New Zealand team, but was forced to withdraw shortly before the match due to illness. He was replaced by Sevu Reece, who came onto the wing, with Will Jordan moving to fullback. Harry Plummer replaced Reece on the bench.
- James Slipper won his 140th cap for Australia, overtaking George Gregan as the Wallabies' most capped player.
- Harry Plummer (New Zealand) made his international debut.
- New Zealand retained the Bledisloe Cup for the 22nd straight year, dating back to 2003.

21 September 2024
18:00 ART (UTC−03)

Argentina	29–28	South Africa (1 BP)
Try: M. Carreras 14' c Matera 21' c Sclavi 26' m Albornoz 34' c Con: Albornoz (3/4) 15', 22', 35'; Pen: Albornoz (1/3) 68'	Report	Try: Fassi 3' c Kriel 7' c Reinach 38' m Con: Pollard (2/3) 4', 8'; Pen: Pollard (2/2) 12', 43'; Libbok (1/2) 50'

Estadio Único Madre de Ciudades, Santiago del Estero
Attendance: 25,000
Referee: Christophe Ridley (England)

FB	15	Juan Cruz Mallía
RW	14	Bautista Delguy	(substituted off) 51'
OC	13	Lucio Cinti	(substituted off) 76'
IC	12	Santiago Chocobares
LW	11	Mateo Carreras
FH	10	Tomás Albornoz
SH	9	Gonzalo Bertranou	(substituted off) 48'
N8	8	Joaquín Oviedo
OF	7	Marcos Kremer	(substituted off) 63'
BF	6	Pablo Matera	(substituted off) 56'
RL	5	Pedro Rubiolo
LL	4	Franco Molina	(substituted off) 56'
TP	3	Joel Sclavi	(substituted off) 60'
HK	2	Julián Montoya (c)
LP	1	Thomas Gallo	(substituted off) 60'
Substitutions:
HK	16	Ignacio Ruiz	(substituted on) 63'
PR	17	Ignacio Calles	(substituted on) 60'
PR	18	Pedro Delgado	(substituted on) 60'
LK	19	Guido Petti	(substituted on) 56'
FL	20	Juan Martín González	(substituted on) 56'
SH	21	Gonzalo García	(substituted on) 48'
FH	22	Santiago Carreras	(substituted on) 51'
CE	23	Matías Moroni	(substituted on) 76'
Coach:
Felipe Contepomi

FB	15	Aphelele Fassi
RW	14	Kurt-Lee Arendse	(yellow card) 17'
OC	13	Jesse Kriel
IC	12	Lukhanyo Am
LW	11	Makazole Mapimpi
FH	10	Handré Pollard		(substituted off) 48'
SH	9	Cobus Reinach		(substituted off) 55'
N8	8	Jasper Wiese
BF	7	Ben-Jason Dixon		(substituted off) 48'
OF	6	Marco van Staden		(substituted off) 48'
RL	5	Ruan Nortjé			(substituted off) 72'
LL	4	Salmaan Moerat (c)		(substituted off) 48'	(substituted on) 72'
TP	3	Thomas du Toit		(substituted off) 48'
HK	2	Malcolm Marx		(substituted off) 70'
LP	1	Ox Nché		(substituted off) 65'
Substitutions:
HK	16	Jan-Hendrik Wessels		(substituted on) 70'
PR	17	Gerhard Steenekamp		(substituted on) 65'
PR	18	Vincent Koch		(substituted on) 48'
LK	19	Eben Etzebeth		(substituted on) 48'
FL	20	Elrigh Louw		(substituted on) 48'
FL	21	Kwagga Smith		(substituted on) 48'
SH	22	Jaden Hendrikse		(substituted on) 55'
FH	23	Manie Libbok		(substituted on) 48'
Coach:
Rassie Erasmus

Assistant referees:
Matthew Carley (England)
Gianluca Gnecchi (Italy)
Television match official:
Ian Tempest (England)
Foul play review officer:
Ben Whitehouse (Wales)

Notes

- Eben Etzebeth equals Victor Matfield's record as most capped player for South Africa (127).
- Argentina beat South Africa for the first time since 2018.
- Argentina win 3 matches in one Rugby Championship for the first time.
- With this win, Argentina get at least one win over each nation in the Championship for the first time ever.
- This was Argentina's first victory against a No. 1 ranked side since the onset of the IRB/World Rugby rankings in 2003.
- Julián Montoya became the first Argentinian captain to have won Australia, New Zealand and South Africa and ninth overall after England's John Pullin, Will Carling, Martin Johnson, Owen Farrell, Ireland's Rory Best and France's Fabien Pelous, Thierry Dusautoir and Antoine Dupont.

=== Round 6 ===
28 September 2024
19:05 NZST (UTC+12)

(1 BP) New Zealand	33–13	Australia
Try: Reece 16' m Jordan 22' c Clarke (2) 40'+1 c, 64' c Williams 55' c Con: B. Barrett (4/5) 23', 40'+2, 56', 66'	Report	Try: McReight 8' c Con: Lolesio (1/1) 9'; Pen: Lolesio (2/2) 19', 37'

Sky Stadium, Wellington
Attendance: 32,000
Referee: Nika Amashukeli (Georgia)

FB	15	Will Jordan
RW	14	Sevu Reece		(substituted off) 62'
OC	13	Rieko Ioane		(substituted off) 66'
IC	12	Anton Lienert-Brown
LW	11	Caleb Clarke	(yellow card) 77'
FH	10	Beauden Barrett
SH	9	TJ Perenara		(substituted off) 62'
N8	8	Ardie Savea
BF	7	Sam Cane		(substituted off) 67'
OF	6	Wallace Sititi
RL	5	Tupou Vaa'i		(substituted off) 62'
LL	4	Scott Barrett (c)
TP	3	Tyrel Lomax		(substituted off) 66'
HK	2	Codie Taylor		(substituted off) 66'
LP	1	Ethan de Groot		(substituted off) 52'
Substitutions:
HK	16	Asafo Aumua		(substituted on) 66'
PR	17	Tamaiti Williams		(substituted on) 52'
PR	18	Pasilio Tosi		(substituted on) 66'
LK	19	Patrick Tuipulotu		(substituted on) 62'
FL	20	Luke Jacobson		(substituted on) 67'
SH	21	Cortez Ratima		(substituted on) 62'
FH	22	Damian McKenzie		(substituted on) 62'
CE	23	David Havili		(substituted on) 66'
Coach:
Scott Robertson

FB	15	Tom Wright
RW	14	Andrew Kellaway
OC	13	Len Ikitau	(substituted off) 75'
IC	12	Hunter Paisami
LW	11	Dylan Pietsch	(substituted off) 63'
FH	10	Noah Lolesio
SH	9	Jake Gordon	(substituted off) 60'
N8	8	Harry Wilson (c)
OF	7	Fraser McReight
BF	6	Rob Valetini	(substituted off) 60'
RL	5	Jeremy Williams
LL	4	Nick Frost	(substituted off) 58'
TP	3	Taniela Tupou	(substituted off) 44'
HK	2	Matt Faessler	(substituted off) 49'
LP	1	Angus Bell	(substituted off) 60'
Substitutions:
HK	16	Brandon Paenga-Amosa	(substituted on) 49'
PR	17	Isaac Aedo Kailea	(substituted on) 60'
PR	18	Allan Alaalatoa	(substituted on) 44'
LK	19	Lukhan Salakaia-Loto	(substituted on) 58'
FL	20	Langi Gleeson	(substituted on) 60'
SH	21	Tate McDermott	(substituted on) 60'
FH	22	Ben Donaldson	(substituted on) 75'
CE	23	Josh Flook	(substituted on) 63'
Coach:
Joe Schmidt

Assistant referees:
Karl Dickson (England)
Damian Schneider (Argentina)
Television match official:
Eric Gauzins (France)
Foul play review officer:
Stuart Terheege (England)

Notes:

- Sam Cane became just the 8th All Blacks forward and the 13th New Zealander to earn his 100th test cap.

28 September 2024
17:00 SAST (UTC+02)

(1 BP) South Africa	48–7	Argentina
Try: Fassi (2) 8' c, 33' m Du Toit (2) 14' c, 73' c Kolbe 38' m Marx 69' c Kriel 77' c Con: Hendrikse (2/4) 9', 15'; Pollard (3/3) 70', 74', 78'; Pen: Hendrikse (1/2) 22'		Try: Albornoz 19' c Con: Albornoz 20'

Mbombela Stadium, Mbombela
Attendance: 43,578
Referee: Ben O'Keeffe (New Zealand)

FB	15	Aphelele Fassi
RW	14	Cheslin Kolbe
OC	13	Jesse Kriel
IC	12	Damian de Allende	(substituted off) 57'
LW	11	Kurt-Lee Arendse
FH	10	Manie Libbok	(substituted off) 67'
SH	9	Jaden Hendrikse	(substituted off) 57'
N8	8	Jasper Wiese	(substituted off) 53'
BF	7	Pieter-Steph du Toit
OF	6	Siya Kolisi (c)	(substituted off) 60'
RL	5	Ruan Nortjé
LL	4	Eben Etzebeth
TP	3	Frans Malherbe	(substituted off) 44'
HK	2	Bongi Mbonambi	(substituted off) 44'
LP	1	Ox Nché	(substituted off) 53'
Substitutions:
HK	16	Malcolm Marx	(substituted on) 44'
PR	17	Gerhard Steenekamp	(substituted on) 53'
PR	18	Vincent Koch	(substituted on) 44'
FL	19	Elrigh Louw	(substituted on) 60'
FL	20	Kwagga Smith	(substituted on) 53'
SH	21	Cobus Reinach	(substituted on) 57'
FH	22	Handré Pollard	(substituted on) 67'
CE	23	Lukhanyo Am	(substituted on) 57'
Coach:
Rassie Erasmus

FB	15	Santiago Carreras	(yellow card) 68'
RW	14	Rodrigo Isgró		(substituted off) 37'
OC	13	Matías Moroni
IC	12	Santiago Chocobares		(substituted off) 26'
LW	11	Mateo Carreras	(yellow card) 29'
FH	10	Tomás Albornoz
SH	9	Gonzalo García		(substituted off) 68'
N8	8	Joaquín Oviedo
OF	7	Santiago Grondona				(substituted off) 44'
BF	6	Juan Martín González		(substituted off) 37'	(substituted on) 41'
RL	5	Tomás Lavanini		(substituted off) 49'
LL	4	Pedro Rubiolo
TP	3	Joel Sclavi		(substituted off) 49'
HK	2	Julián Montoya (c)		(substituted off) 57'
LP	1	Thomas Gallo		(substituted off) 57'
Substitutions:
HK	16	Ignacio Ruiz		(substituted on) 57'
PR	17	Ignacio Calles		(substituted on) 57'
PR	18	Pedro Delgado		(substituted on) 49'
LK	19	Franco Molina		(substituted on) 49'
FL	20	Pablo Matera	(red card) 55'	(substituted on) 37'	(substituted off) 41'	(substituted on) 44'
SH	21	Lautaro Bazán		(substituted on) 68'
CE	22	Lucio Cinti		(substituted on) 26'
FB	23	Juan Cruz Mallía		(substituted on) 37'
Coach:
Felipe Contepomi

Assistant referees:
James Doleman (New Zealand)
Craig Evans (Wales)
Television match official:
Glenn Newman (New Zealand)
Foul play review officer:
Andrew Jackson (England)

Notes:

- Eben Etzebeth won his 128th cap for South Africa, overtaking Victor Matfield as the Springboks' most capped player.

== Statistics ==
=== Points scorers ===
Pos.	Name	Team	Pts.
1	Damian McKenzie	New Zealand	62
2	Tomás Albornoz	Argentina	44
3	Santiago Carreras	Argentina	36
4	Sacha Feinberg-Mngomezulu	South Africa	35
4	Noah Lolesio	Australia	35
6	Caleb Clarke	New Zealand	30
7	Handré Pollard	South Africa	23
8	Aphelele Fassi	South Africa	20
8	Will Jordan	New Zealand	20
8	Malcolm Marx	South Africa	20

=== Try scorers ===
Pos.	Name	Team	Tries
1	Caleb Clarke	New Zealand	6
2	Aphelele Fassi	South Africa	4
2	Will Jordan	New Zealand	4
2	Malcolm Marx	South Africa	4
5	Mateo Carreras	Argentina	3
5	Pieter-Steph du Toit	South Africa	3
5	Juan Cruz Mallía	Argentina	3
8	Tomás Albornoz	Argentina	2
8	Kurt-Lee Arendse	South Africa	2
8	Lucio Cinti	Argentina	2
8	Juan Martín González	Argentina	2
8	Siya Kolisi	South Africa	2
8	Jesse Kriel	South Africa	2
8	Pablo Matera	Argentina	2
8	Fraser McReight	Australia	2
8	Joaquín Oviedo	Argentina	2
8	Hunter Paisami	Australia	2
8	Ardie Savea	New Zealand	2
8	Kwagga Smith	South Africa	2

== Participants ==
Team	Stadium			Coach	Captain	World Rugby Ranking	
Team	Home stadium	Capacity	Location	Coach	Captain	Start (Note: As at 5 August 2024.)	End (Note: As at 30 September 2024.)
Argentina	Jorge Luis Hirschi	30,000	La Plata (vs. Australia)	Felipe Contepomi	Julian Montoya/Pablo Matera	7th	6th
Argentina	Estadio Brigadier General Estanislao López	30,835	Santa Fe (vs. Australia)	Felipe Contepomi	Julian Montoya/Pablo Matera	7th	6th
Argentina	Estadio Único Madre de Ciudades	30,000	Santiago del Estero (vs. South Africa)	Felipe Contepomi	Julian Montoya/Pablo Matera	7th	6th
Australia	Lang Park	52,500	Brisbane (vs. South Africa)	Joe Schmidt	Allan Alaalatoa/Harry Wilson	9th	10th
Australia	Perth Stadium	65,000	Perth (vs. South Africa)	Joe Schmidt	Allan Alaalatoa/Harry Wilson	9th	10th
Australia	Stadium Australia	82,000	Sydney (vs. New Zealand)	Joe Schmidt	Allan Alaalatoa/Harry Wilson	9th	10th
New Zealand	Eden Park	60,000	Auckland (vs. Argentina)	Scott Robertson	Scott Barrett/Ardie Savea	3rd	3rd
New Zealand	Wellington Regional Stadium	34,500	Wellington	Scott Robertson	Scott Barrett/Ardie Savea	3rd	3rd
South Africa	Cape Town Stadium	58,310	Cape Town (vs. New Zealand)	Rassie Erasmus	Siya Kolisi/Salmaan Moerat	1st	2nd
South Africa	Ellis Park Stadium	62,567	Johannesburg (vs. New Zealand)	Rassie Erasmus	Siya Kolisi/Salmaan Moerat	1st	2nd
South Africa	Mbombela Stadium	43,500	Mbombela (vs. Argentina)	Rassie Erasmus	Siya Kolisi/Salmaan Moerat	1st	2nd

=== Squads ===
==== Argentina ====
On 31 July 2024, Argentina named a 31-man squad for the opening two matches of the Rugby Championship. Santiago Grondona, Guido Petti, Ignacio Calles and Pedro Delgado were added to the squad over the course of the championship.

Player	Position	Date of birth (age)	Caps	Club/province
Agustín Creevy	Hooker	15 March 1985 (aged 39)	108	Unattached
Julián Montoya (c)	Hooker	29 October 1993 (aged 30)	97	(England) Leicester Tigers
Ignacio Ruiz	Hooker	3 January 2001 (aged 23)	10	(France) Perpignan
Eduardo Bello	Prop	27 November 1995 (aged 28)	24	(England) Newcastle Falcons
Ignacio Calles	Prop	25 October 1995 (aged 28)	3	(France) Pau
Pedro Delgado	Prop	1 September 1997 (aged 26)	0	(Argentina) Dogos
Thomas Gallo	Prop	30 April 1999 (aged 25)	26	(Italy) Benetton
Joel Sclavi	Prop	25 June 1994 (aged 30)	18	(France) La Rochelle
Lucio Sordoni	Prop	23 July 1998 (aged 26)	7	(France) Racing 92
Mayco Vivas	Prop	2 June 1998 (aged 26)	24	(England) Gloucester
Efraín Elías	Lock	30 April 2004 (aged 20)	0	(France) Toulouse
Tomás Lavanini	Lock	22 January 1993 (aged 31)	86	(France) Lyon
Franco Molina	Lock	28 August 1997 (aged 26)	3	(Argentina) Dogos
Guido Petti	Lock	17 November 1994 (aged 29)	76	(France) Bordeaux Bègles
Pedro Rubiolo	Lock	12 December 2002 (aged 21)	12	(England) Newcastle Falcons
Juan Martín González	Back row	14 November 2000 (aged 23)	31	(England) Saracens
Santiago Grondona	Back row	25 July 1998 (aged 26)	16	(England) Bristol Bears
Marcos Kremer	Back row	30 July 1997 (age 29)	67	(France) Clermont
Pablo Matera	Back row	18 July 1993 (aged 31)	101	(Japan) Mie Honda Heat
Joaquín Oviedo	Back row	17 July 2001 (aged 23)	5	(France) Perpignan
Juan Bautista Pedemonte	Back row	14 March 2000 (aged 24)	1	(France) Vannes
Lautaro Bazán	Scrum-half	24 February 1996 (aged 28)	15	(Italy) Benetton
Gonzalo Bertranou	Scrum-half	31 December 1993 (aged 30)	60	Unattached
Gonzalo García	Scrum-half	5 March 1999 (aged 25)	4	(Italy) Zebre Parma
Tomás Albornoz	Fly-half	17 September 1997 (aged 26)	8	(Italy) Benetton
Santiago Carreras	Fly-half	30 March 1998 (aged 26)	45	(England) Gloucester
Santiago Chocobares	Centre	31 March 1999 (aged 25)	21	(France) Toulouse
Lucio Cinti	Centre	23 February 2000 (aged 24)	23	(England) Saracens
Matías Moroni	Centre	29 March 1991 (aged 33)	82	Unattached
Matías Orlando	Centre	14 November 1991 (aged 32)	61	(United States) Miami Sharks
Mateo Carreras	Wing	17 December 1999 (aged 24)	20	(France) Bayonne
Santiago Cordero	Wing	6 December 1993 (aged 30)	52	(Ireland) Connacht
Bautista Delguy	Wing	22 April 1997 (aged 27)	27	(France) Clermont
Martín Bogado	Fullback	29 April 1998 (aged 26)	4	(France) Oyonnax
Juan Cruz Mallía	Fullback	11 September 1996 (aged 27)	33	(France) Toulouse

==== Australia ====
On 1 August, Australia named an initial 36-player squad for the opening two matches of the Rugby Championship. On 20 August, Australia named a 35-player squad for the Round 3 and 4 matches against Argentina. On 13 September, Australia named a further 36-player squad for the Bledisloe Cup series against New Zealand. All players in these squads are listed here.

Player	Position	Date of birth (age)	Caps	Club/province
Matt Faessler	Hooker	21 December 1998 (aged 25)	7	(Australia) Reds
Josh Nasser	Hooker	23 June 1999 (aged 25)	2	(Australia) Reds
Brandon Paenga-Amosa	Hooker	25 December 1995 (aged 28)	9	(Australia) Force
Billy Pollard	Hooker	12 September 2001 (aged 22)	3	(Australia) Brumbies
Allan Alaalatoa (c)	Prop	28 January 1994 (aged 30)	70	(Australia) Brumbies
Angus Bell	Prop	4 October 2000 (aged 23)	28	(Australia) Waratahs
Isaac Aedo Kailea	Prop	13 July 2000 (aged 24)	3	Unattached
Zane Nonggorr	Prop	30 March 2001 (aged 23)	6	(Australia) Reds
Tom Robertson	Prop	28 August 1994 (aged 29)	24	(Australia) Force
James Slipper	Prop	6 June 1989 (aged 35)	136	(Australia) Brumbies
Taniela Tupou	Prop	10 May 1996 (aged 28)	52	(Australia) Waratahs
Angus Blyth	Lock	4 March 1998 (aged 26)	3	(Australia) Reds
Josh Canham	Lock	1 February 2001 (aged 23)	1	(Australia) Rebels
Nick Frost	Lock	10 October 1999 (aged 24)	16	(Australia) Brumbies
Lukhan Salakaia-Loto	Lock	19 September 1996 (aged 27)	32	(Australia) Reds
Jeremy Williams	Lock	2 December 2000 (aged 23)	3	(Australia) Waratahs
Langi Gleeson	Back row	21 July 2001 (aged 23)	7	(Australia) Waratahs
Tom Hooper	Back row	1 January 2002 (aged 22)	9	(Australia) Brumbies
Fraser McReight	Back row	19 February 1999 (aged 25)	17	(Australia) Reds
Luke Reimer	Back row	27 May 2000 (aged 24)	0	(Australia) Brumbies
Carlo Tizzano	Back row	2 February 2000 (aged 24)	0	(Australia) Force
Seru Uru	Back row	3 March 1997 (aged 27)	0	(Australia) Reds
Rob Valetini	Back row	3 September 1998 (aged 25)	42	(Australia) Brumbies
Harry Wilson	Back row	22 November 1999 (aged 24)	13	(Australia) Reds
Jake Gordon	Scrum-half	6 July 1993 (aged 31)	22	(Australia) Waratahs
Tate McDermott	Scrum-half	18 September 1998 (aged 25)	31	(Australia) Reds
Nic White	Scrum-half	13 June 1990 (aged 34)	68	(Australia) Brumbies
Ben Donaldson	Fly-half	5 April 1999 (aged 25)	9	(Australia) Waratahs
Noah Lolesio	Fly-half	18 December 1999 (aged 24)	20	(Australia) Brumbies
Tom Lynagh	Fly-half	14 April 2003 (aged 21)	1	(Australia) Reds
David Feliuai	Centre	16 May 1997 (aged 27)	0	(Australia) Brumbies
Josh Flook	Centre	22 September 2001 (aged 22)	2	(Australia) Reds
Len Ikitau	Centre	1 October 1998 (aged 25)	29	(Australia) Brumbies
Hunter Paisami	Centre	10 April 1999 (aged 25)	27	(Australia) Reds
Hamish Stewart	Centre	3 March 1998 (aged 26)	0	(Australia) Force
Filipo Daugunu	Wing	4 March 1995 (aged 29)	10	(Australia) Reds
Andrew Kellaway	Wing	12 October 1995 (aged 28)	29	(Australia) Waratahs
Marika Koroibete	Wing	26 July 1992 (aged 32)	59	(Japan) Saitama Wild Knights
Dylan Pietsch	Wing	23 April 1998 (aged 26)	2	(Australia) Waratahs
Corey Toole	Wing	7 March 2000 (aged 24)	0	(Australia) Brumbies
Max Jorgensen	Fullback	2 September 2004 (aged 19)	0	(Australia) Waratahs
Tom Wright	Fullback	21 July 1997 (aged 27)	28	(Australia) Brumbies

==== New Zealand ====
On 28 July, New Zealand announced their 36–player squad for the Rugby Championship. On 5 August, Harry Plummer was called up to the squad as injury cover for Stephen Perofeta. On 8 August, Josh Lord was named in the team to face Argentina in Wellington. George Bower was added to the squad ahead of the Round 3 match against South Africa. On 15 September, Ethan de Groot was called back into the squad and Fletcher Newell was ruled out due to a calf injury. George Bower will remain with the squad as injury cover.

Player	Position	Date of birth (age)	Caps	Franchise/province
Asafo Aumua	Hooker	5 May 1997 (aged 27)	9	Hurricanes / Wellington
Codie Taylor	Hooker	31 March 1991 (aged 33)	87	Crusaders / Canterbury
George Bell	Hooker	29 January 2002 (aged 22)	1	Crusaders / Canterbury
George Bower	Prop	28 May 1992 (aged 32)	23	Crusaders / Otago
Ethan de Groot	Prop	22 July 1998 (aged 26)	25	Highlanders / Southland
Tyrel Lomax	Prop	16 March 1996 (aged 28)	34	Hurricanes / Tasman
Fletcher Newell	Prop	1 March 2000 (aged 24)	16	Crusaders / Canterbury
Pasilio Tosi	Prop	18 July 1998 (aged 26)	1	Hurricanes / Bay of Plenty
Ofa Tuʻungafasi	Prop	19 April 1992 (aged 32)	59	Blues / Northland
Tamaiti Williams	Prop	10 August 2000 (aged 24)	8	Crusaders / Canterbury
Scott Barrett (c)	Lock	20 November 1993 (aged 30)	72	Crusaders / Taranaki
Tupou Vaa'i	Lock	27 January 2000 (aged 24)	28	Chiefs / Taranaki
Patrick Tuipulotu	Lock	23 January 1993 (aged 31)	45	Blues / Auckland
Sam Darry	Lock	18 July 2000 (aged 24)	1	Blues / Canterbury
Josh Lord	Lock	17 January 2001 (aged 23)	4	Chiefs / Taranaki
Ethan Blackadder	Loose forward	22 March 1995 (aged 29)	11	Crusaders / Tasman
Sam Cane	Loose forward	13 January 1992 (aged 32)	95	Chiefs / Bay of Plenty
Samipeni Finau	Loose forward	10 May 1999 (aged 25)	3	Chiefs / Waikato
Luke Jacobson	Loose forward	20 April 1997 (aged 27)	21	Chiefs / Waikato
Dalton Papali'i	Loose forward	11 October 1997 (aged 26)	34	Blues / Counties Manukau
Ardie Savea	Loose forward	14 October 1993 (aged 30)	84	Hurricanes / Wellington
Wallace Sititi	Loose forward	7 September 2002 (aged 21)	1	Chiefs / North Harbour
Noah Hotham	Half-back	23 May 2003 (aged 21)	1	Crusaders / Tasman
TJ Perenara	Half-back	23 January 1992 (aged 32)	81	Hurricanes / Wellington
Cortez Ratima	Half-back	22 March 2001 (aged 23)	2	Chiefs / Waikato
Beauden Barrett	First five-eighth	27 May 1991 (aged 33)	126	Blues / Taranaki
Damian McKenzie	First five-eighth	20 April 1995 (aged 29)	50	Chiefs / Waikato
Harry Plummer	First five-eighth	19 June 1998 (aged 26)	0	Blues / Auckland
Jordie Barrett	Centre	17 February 1997 (aged 27)	60	Hurricanes / Taranaki
David Havili	Centre	23 December 1994 (aged 29)	27	Crusaders / Tasman
Rieko Ioane	Centre	18 March 1997 (aged 27)	71	Blues / Auckland
Anton Lienert-Brown	Centre	15 April 1995 (aged 29)	73	Chiefs / Waikato
Billy Proctor	Centre	14 May 1999 (aged 25)	1	Hurricanes / Wellington
Caleb Clarke	Wing	29 March 1999 (aged 25)	21	Blues / Auckland
Sevu Reece	Wing	13 February 1997 (aged 27)	26	Crusaders / Southland
Mark Tele'a	Wing	6 December 1996 (aged 27)	11	Blues / North Harbour
Will Jordan	Fullback	24 February 1998 (aged 26)	31	Crusaders / Tasman
Ruben Love	Fullback	28 April 2001 (aged 23)	0	Hurricanes / Wellington
Stephen Perofeta	Fullback	12 March 1997 (aged 27)	5	Blues / Taranaki

==== South Africa ====
On 23 July, South Africa named a 33-player squad for the opening two matches of the Rugby Championship. On 20 August, a squad of 37 players was named for their two matches against New Zealand. On 10 September, a squad of 28 players was named for their two matches against Argentina. All players in these squads are listed here.

Player	Position	Date of birth (age)	Caps	Club/province
Johan Grobbelaar	Hooker	30 December 1997 (aged 26)	1	(South Africa) Bulls
Malcolm Marx	Hooker	13 July 1994 (aged 30)	67	(Japan) Kubota Spears
Bongi Mbonambi	Hooker	7 January 1991 (aged 33)	71	(South Africa) Sharks
Jan-Hendrik Wessels	Hooker	8 May 2001 (aged 23)	1	(South Africa) Bulls
Thomas du Toit	Prop	3 May 1995 (aged 29)	19	(England) Bath
Steven Kitshoff	Prop	10 February 1992 (aged 32)	83	(South Africa) Stormers
Vincent Koch	Prop	13 March 1990 (aged 34)	52	(South Africa) Sharks
Frans Malherbe	Prop	14 March 1991 (aged 33)	72	(South Africa) Stormers
Ox Nché	Prop	23 July 1995 (aged 29)	31	(South Africa) Sharks
Gerhard Steenekamp	Prop	9 April 1997 (aged 27)	3	(South Africa) Bulls
Eben Etzebeth	Lock	29 October 1991 (aged 32)	122	(South Africa) Sharks
Nico Janse van Rensburg	Lock	6 May 1994 (aged 30)	1	(France) Montpellier
Salmaan Moerat (vc)	Lock	6 March 1998 (aged 26)	7	(South Africa) Stormers
Ruan Nortjé	Lock	25 July 1998 (aged 26)	1	(South Africa) Bulls
RG Snyman	Lock	29 January 1995 (aged 29)	37	(Ireland) Leinster
Ben-Jason Dixon	Loose forward	29 April 1998 (aged 26)	2	(South Africa) Stormers
Pieter-Steph du Toit	Loose forward	20 August 1992 (aged 31)	79	(Japan) Toyota Verblitz
Siya Kolisi (c)	Loose forward	16 June 1991 (aged 33)	85	(France) Racing 92
Elrigh Louw	Loose forward	20 September 1999 (aged 24)	4	(South Africa) Bulls
Kwagga Smith	Loose forward	11 June 1993 (aged 31)	43	(Japan) Shizuoka Blue Revs
Marco van Staden	Loose forward	25 August 1995 (aged 28)	20	(South Africa) Bulls
Jasper Wiese	Loose forward	21 October 1995 (aged 28)	27	(England) Leicester Tigers
Jaden Hendrikse	Scrum-half	23 March 2000 (aged 24)	15	(South Africa) Sharks
Cobus Reinach	Scrum-half	7 February 1990 (aged 34)	33	(France) Montpellier
Morné van den Berg	Scrum-half	24 October 1997 (aged 26)	1	(South Africa) Lions
Grant Williams	Scrum-half	2 July 1996 (aged 28)	11	(South Africa) Sharks
Sacha Feinberg-Mngomezulu	Fly-half	22 February 2002 (aged 22)	4	(South Africa) Stormers
Manie Libbok	Fly-half	15 July 1997 (aged 27)	15	(South Africa) Stormers
Handré Pollard	Fly-half	11 March 1994 (aged 30)	71	(England) Leicester Tigers
Lukhanyo Am	Centre	28 November 1993 (aged 30)	36	(South Africa) Sharks
Damian de Allende	Centre	25 November 1991 (aged 32)	81	(Japan) Saitama Wild Knights
André Esterhuizen	Centre	30 March 1994 (aged 30)	18	(South Africa) Sharks
Jesse Kriel	Centre	15 February 1994 (aged 30)	71	(Japan) Yokohama Canon Eagles
Kurt-Lee Arendse	Wing	17 June 1996 (aged 28)	18	(South Africa) Bulls
Cheslin Kolbe	Wing	28 October 1993 (aged 30)	33	(Japan) Suntory Sungoliath
Makazole Mapimpi	Wing	26 July 1990 (aged 34)	43	(South Africa) Sharks
Canan Moodie	Wing	5 November 2002 (aged 21)	10	(South Africa) Bulls
Aphelele Fassi	Fullback	23 January 1998 (aged 26)	5	(South Africa) Sharks
Willie le Roux	Fullback	18 August 1989 (aged 34)	95	(South Africa) Bulls

== See also ==
- 2024 U20 Rugby Championship
- 2024 Six Nations Championship
- 2024 World Rugby Pacific Nations Cup
- Argentina–Australia matches
- Argentina–New Zealand matches
- Argentina–South Africa matches
- Australia–New Zealand matches
- Australia–South Africa matches
- New Zealand–South Africa matches
