= Kurt-Lee Arendse =

South African rugby union player

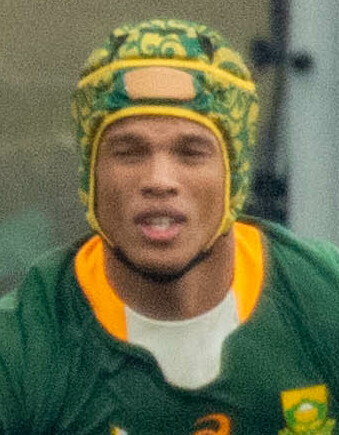
- Arendse playing in 2022
- Full name: Kurt-Lee Arendse
- Born: 17 June 1996 (age 30) Paarl, South Africa
- Height: 1.77 m (5 ft 9 1/2 in)
- Weight: 80 kg (180 lb)
- School: Paulus Joubert Secondary School, Paarl
- University: University of the Western Cape

Rugby union career
- Position: Wing Fullback
- Current team: Mitsubishi Sagamihara DynaBoars
Youth career
- 2015: Western Province U19
- 2016: Boland U20
- 2017: Western Province U21
Senior career
Years	Team	Apps	(Points)
2020–	Bulls	53	(160)
2020–	Blue Bulls	14	(20)
2024-2025 2026-2027	→ Mitsubishi Sagamihara DynaBoars	12	(35)
- Correct as of 4 July 2026
International career
Years	Team	Apps	(Points)
2019–2021	South Africa Sevens	41	(75)
2022–	South Africa	35	(135)
- Correct as of 27 September 2026
Medal record
Men's Rugby union
Representing South Africa
Rugby World Cup
Gold medal – first place	2023 France	Squad

Kurt-Lee Arendse (born 17 June 1996) is a South African professional rugby union player who plays as a wing for the Bulls in the United Rugby Championship and for the South Africa national team. Known for his pace, agility and finishing ability, he has become one of the Springboks’ most influential outside backs since his debut in 2022.

== Early life ==
Arendse was born in Paarl and attended Paulus Joubert Secondary School, where he earned selection for the Boland Cavaliers sevens team at the 2014 SARU Under-18 Sevens tournament.

Despite his promise, he did not enter the mainstream provincial rugby system after matric and worked at a local butchery in Paarl. During one of SA Rugby’s youth weeks, while representing a Boland Academy side, he was spotted by former Springbok winger Chester Williams. Williams subsequently offered him an opportunity to join UWC, providing Arendse with a route into competitive rugby.

== Club career ==
Arendse progressed through the junior structures of Boland and Western Province, representing Western Province U19 in the 2015 Under-19 Provincial Championship, Boland U20 in the 2016 Under-20 Provincial Championship, and Western Province U21 in the 2017 Under-21 Provincial Championship.

He later joined the Bulls in Pretoria in 2020, transitioning fully into the fifteen-a-side game after the COVID-19 pandemic halted the international sevens circuit where he had been representing South Africa. He made an immediate impact in domestic competition and quickly established himself as a key member of the Bulls’ United Rugby Championship and Currie Cup squads.

== International career ==
Arendse made his international debut for South Africa on 9 July 2022 in a Test against Wales in Bloemfontein. He soon became a first-choice wing for the Springboks, noted for his speed, aerial ability and finishing.

He started in the 2023 Rugby World Cup final, helping South Africa secure a 12–11 victory over New Zealand. Arendse has also been part of the Springbok squads that won the 2023 Rugby Championship and 2024 Rugby Championship.

=== Blitzboks ===
Arendse’s rise to elite rugby was strongly shaped by sevens. After excelling in the Varsity Cup structures and being named MVP of the 2018 Varsity Cup Sevens tournament, he joined the South African Rugby Sevens Academy in December 2018.

Following an impressive 2019 Varsity Cup season for UWC, he earned selection for the Blitzboks at the Vancouver Sevens.

He made his World Series debut in a 31–12 semi-final victory over Fiji and was part of the squad that defeated France 21–12 in the final.

He also represented Monaco in the 2020 Supersevens tournament before focusing full-time on fifteens with the Bulls.

== Statistics ==
=== Test match record ===
As of 15 November 2026

Opponent	P	W	D	L	Try	Pts	%Won
Argentina	4	3	0	1	1	5	75
Australia	3	2	0	1	6	30	66.67
England	4	4	0	0	2	10	100
France	4	2	0	2	2	10	50
Georgia	1	1	0	0	1	5	100
Ireland	4	1	0	3	2	10	25
Italy	4	4	0	0	3	15	100
Japan	1	1	0	0	2	10	100
New Zealand	7	6	0	1	4	20	85.71
Portugal	1	1	0	0	1	5	100
Scotland	1	1	0	0	1	5	100
Wales	3	2	0	1	2	10	66.67
Total	37	28	0	9	27	135	75.68

=== International tries ===
As of 13 September 2026

Try	Opposing team	Location	Venue	Competition	Date	Result	Score
1	New Zealand	Mbombela, South Africa	Mbombela Stadium	2022 Rugby Championship	6 August 2022	Win	26–10
2	Argentina	Durban, South Africa	Hollywoodbets Kings Park	2022 Rugby Championship	24 September 2022	Win	38–21
3	Ireland	Dublin, Ireland	Aviva Stadium	2022 Autumn Nations Series	5 November 2022	Loss	19–16
4	France	Marseille, France	Stade Vélodrome	2022 Autumn Nations Series	12 November 2022	Loss	30–26
5	Italy	Genoa, Italy	Stadio Luigi Ferraris	2022 Autumn Nations Series	19 November 2022	Win	21–63
6	Italy	Genoa, Italy	Stadio Luigi Ferraris	2022 Autumn Nations Series	19 November 2022	Win	21–63
7	England	London, England	Twickenham Stadium	2022 Autumn Nations Series	26 November 2022	Win	13–27
8	Australia	Pretoria, South Africa	Loftus Versfeld Stadium	2023 Rugby Championship	8 July 2023	Win	43–12
9	Australia	Pretoria, South Africa	Loftus Versfeld Stadium	2023 Rugby Championship	8 July 2023	Win	43–12
10	Australia	Pretoria, South Africa	Loftus Versfeld Stadium	2023 Rugby Championship	8 July 2023	Win	43–12
11	New Zealand	London, England	Twickenham Stadium	2023 Rugby World Cup warm-up matches	25 August 2023	Win	7–35
12	Scotland	Marseille, France	Stade Vélodrome	2023 Rugby World Cup	10 September 2023	Win	18–3
13	France	Saint-Denis, France	Stade de France	2023 Rugby World Cup	15 October 2023	Win	28–29
14	Ireland	Pretoria, South Africa	Loftus Versfeld Stadium	2024 Ireland tour of South Africa	6 July 2024	Win	27–20
15	Portugal	Bloemfontein, South Africa	Free State Stadium	2024 mid-year tests	20 July 2024	Win	64–21
16	Australia	Brisbane, Australia	Lang Park	2024 Rugby Championship	10 August 2024	Win	7–33
17	Australia	Brisbane, Australia	Lang Park	2024 Rugby Championship	10 August 2024	Win	7–33
18	Wales	Cardiff, Wales	Millennium Stadium	2024 Autumn Nations Series	23 November 2024	Win	12–45
19	Italy	Pretoria, South Africa	Loftus Versfeld Stadium	2025 Italy tour of South Africa	5 July 2025	Win	42–24
20	Georgia	Mbombela, South Africa	Mbombela Stadium	2025 mid-year tests	19 July 2025	Win	55–10
21	Australia	Johannesburg, South Africa	Ellis Park Stadium	2025 Rugby Championship	16 August 2025	Loss	22–38
22	Japan	London, England	Wembley Stadium	2025 end-of-year tests	1 November 2025	Win	7–61
23	Japan	London, England	Wembley Stadium	2025 end-of-year tests	1 November 2025	Win	7–61
24	England	Johannesburg, South Africa	Ellis Park Stadium	2026 Nations Championship	4 July 2026	Win	45–21
25	Wales	Durban, South Africa	Kings Park Stadium	2026 Nations Championship	18 July 2026	Win	43–0
26	New Zealand	Johannesburg, South Africa	FNB Stadium	2026 New Zealand tour of South Africa	5 September 2026	Win	29–24
27	New Zealand	baltimore, United States	M&T Bank Stadium	2026 New Zealand tour of South Africa	12 September 2026	Win	43–28

== Honours ==
South Africa

- Rugby World Cup:
  - Winner: 2023
- The Rugby Championship:
  - Winner: 2024, 2025

• Greatest Rivalry Tour:
° Winner: 2026
Blitzboks

- World Rugby Sevens Series tournament titles:
  - Winner: 2019 Canada Sevens, 2019 Singapore Sevens, 2019 Dubai Sevens, 2020 USA Sevens

Bulls

- Super Rugby Unlocked:
  - Winner: 2020
- Currie Cup:
  - Winner: 2020–21
- United Rugby Championship:
  - Runner-up: 2021–22
  - Runner-up: 2023-2024
  - Runner-up: 2025-2026

Individual

- United Rugby Championship Player of the Month (South Africa):
  - March 2022
- United Rugby Championship Elite XV:
  - Named in: 2022–23, 2023–24
- Bulls Awards:
  - Vodacom Bulls Heineken Champions Cup Player of the Year: 2022–23
  - Vodacom Fans Player of the Year – APP: 2023
  - Vodacom Players’ Player of the Year: 2023
  - Vodacom Player of the Year: 2023
