= Efraín Elías =

Argentine rugby union player

- Born: 30 April 2004 (age 22) Deán Funes, Argentina
- Height: 200 cm (6 ft 7 in)
- Weight: 117 kg (258 lb; 18 st 6 lb)

Rugby union career
- Position: Lock
- Current team: Toulouse
Senior career
| Years | Team | Apps | (Points) |
| 2023–2024 | Dogos XV | 16 | (15) |
| 2024– | Toulouse | 14 | (10) |
- Correct as of 15 December 2025
International career
| Years | Team | Apps | (Points) |
| 2022–2024 | Argentina U20 | 16 | (30) |
| 2024– | Argentina | 2 | (0) |
- Correct as of 15 December 2025

Efraín Elías (born 30 April 2004) is an Argentine rugby union player, who plays for Toulouse. His preferred position is lock.

== Early career ==
Elías is from Deán Funes in the Córdoba province and played his youth rugby for the Jockey Club in Córdoba. He represented his region at U18 level in 2022. Elías represented the Argentina U20 side in 2022, 2023 and 2024.

== Professional career ==
Elías first professional experience was for the Dogos XV side in the Super Rugby Americas competition. He debuted in the opening match of the competition, and played throughout the competition as the Dogos XV side reached the final. In his second season for the side the team went one better and won the competition, with Elías delivering a number of man of the match awards. In June 2024, it was announced he had signed for Toulouse.

Elías was called into the Argentina squad for the 2024 Rugby Championship. He would debut in the opening round of the competition against New Zealand.
