= Vincent Koch =

South African rugby union player

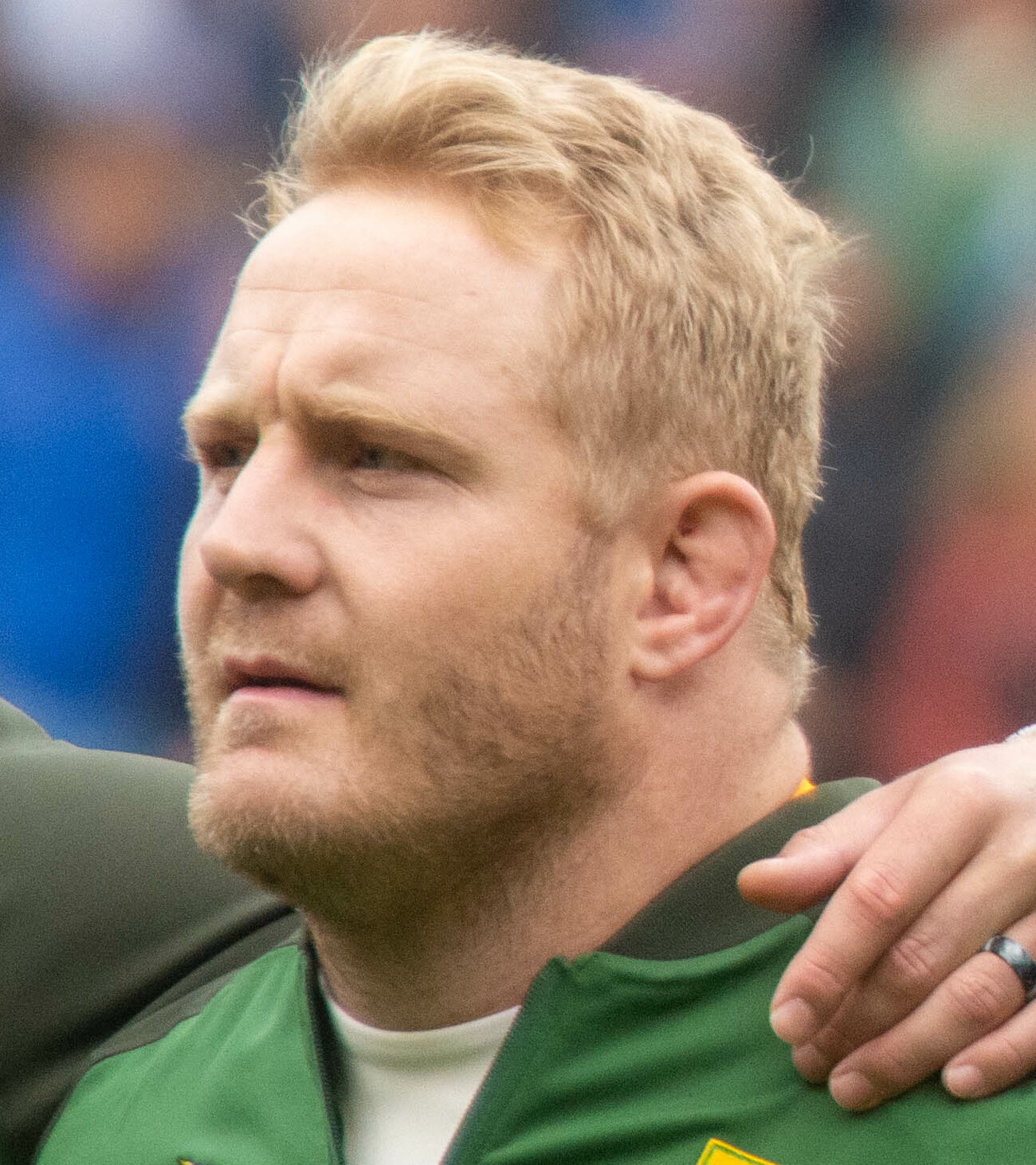
- Koch playing in 2022
- Full name: Vincent Philip Koch
- Born: 13 March 1990 (age 36) Empangeni, South Africa
- Height: 1.85 m (6 ft 1 in)
- Weight: 118 kg (18 st 8 lb; 260 lb)
- School: Grantham Park Primary School, Huguenot High School
- University: University of Pretoria
- Notable relative: Divan Koch

Rugby union career
- Position: Tighthead Prop
- Current team: Sharks
Youth career
- 2006–2008: Boland Cavaliers
- 2009–2010: Blue Bulls
Amateur team(s)
| Years | Team | Apps | (Points) |
| 2011–2012 | UP Tuks | 10 | (0) |
Senior career
| Years | Team | Apps | (Points) |
| 2012 | Blue Bulls | 3 | (5) |
| 2012–2016 | Pumas | 51 | (40) |
| 2015–2016 | Stormers | 33 | (35) |
| 2016–2022 | Saracens | 110 | (50) |
| 2022–2023 | Stade Français | 12 | (0) |
| 2023– | Sharks | 44 | (25) |
- Correct as of 10 October 2026
International career
| Years | Team | Apps | (Points) |
| 2015–present | South Africa | 63 | (5) |
- Correct as of 19 July 2025
Medal record
Men's Rugby union
Representing South Africa
Rugby World Cup
| Gold medal – first place | 2019 Japan | Squad |
| Gold medal – first place | 2023 France | Squad |

Vincent Philip Koch (born 13 March 1990) is a South African professional rugby union player who currently plays for the Sharks in the United Rugby Championship and the South Africa national team.

== Club career ==
Koch regularly plays as a prop and has previously represented the Blue Bulls, UP Tuks and the Pumas.

He joined the Stormers for the 2015 Super Rugby season, but returned to the Pumas for the Currie Cup.

In 2016 he joined English side Saracens. During his time at Saracens he has won two Premiership titles in 2018 and 2019. He also helped Saracens win the European Champions Cup in 2017 and 2019.

On 9 December 2021, Koch announced he would leave Saracens after five seasons at the club to join Premiership rivals Wasps on a long term deal ahead of the 2022-23 season.

Wasps entered administration on 17 October 2022 and Koch was made redundant along with all other players and coaching staff.

On 27 October 2022 it was confirmed that Koch had signed for French Top 14 side Stade Français.

Koch joined the Sharks ahead of the 2023–24 United Rugby Championship, but did not make his debut until 23 March 2024, due to a knee injury sustained during the 2023 Rugby World Cup.

Koch was named as Man of the Match for the 2023–24 EPCR Challenge Cup final, as the Sharks defeated Gloucester to claim the title.

== International career ==
In 2013, he was included in a South Africa President's XV team that played in the 2013 IRB Tbilisi Cup and won the tournament after winning all three matches.

In July 2015, Koch came off the Bench for the Springboks in an uncapped game against a World XV at Newlands Stadium in a 46-10 Win.

In 2016, Koch was included in a South Africa 'A' squad that played a two-match series against a touring England Saxons team. He was named in the starting line-up for their first match in Bloemfontein, but ended on the losing side as the visitors ran out 32–24 winners.

Koch was named in South Africa's squad for the 2019 Rugby World Cup. South Africa won the tournament, defeating England in the final.

== Honours ==
South Africa

- 2019 Rugby Championship winner
- 2019 Rugby World Cup winner
- 2023 Rugby World Cup winner
- 2024 Rugby Championship winner

== Statistics ==
=== Test match record ===
As of 19 July 2025

| Opponent | P | W | D | L | Try | Pts | %Won |
|---|---|---|---|---|---|---|---|
| Argentina | 10 | 7 | 0 | 3 | 0 | 0 | 70 |
| Australia | 8 | 5 | 0 | 3 | 0 | 0 | 62.5 |
| British & Irish Lions | 2 | 2 | 0 | 0 | 0 | 0 | 100 |
| Canada | 1 | 1 | 0 | 0 | 0 | 0 | 100 |
| England | 5 | 3 | 0 | 2 | 0 | 0 | 60 |
| France | 3 | 2 | 0 | 1 | 0 | 0 | 66.67 |
| Georgia | 1 | 1 | 0 | 0 | 0 | 0 | 100 |
| Ireland | 3 | 1 | 0 | 2 | 0 | 0 | 33.33 |
| Italy | 4 | 3 | 0 | 1 | 1 | 5 | 75 |
| Japan | 1 | 1 | 0 | 0 | 0 | 0 | 100 |
| Namibia | 1 | 1 | 0 | 0 | 0 | 0 | 100 |
| New Zealand | 11 | 4 | 0 | 7 | 0 | 0 | 36.36 |
| Scotland | 3 | 3 | 0 | 0 | 0 | 0 | 100 |
| Tonga | 1 | 1 | 0 | 0 | 0 | 0 | 100 |
| Wales | 9 | 7 | 0 | 2 | 0 | 0 | 77.78 |
| Total | 63 | 42 | 0 | 21 | 1 | 5 | 66.67 |

=== International tries ===
As of 5 July 2025

| Try | Opposing team | Location | Venue | Competition | Date | Result | Score |
|---|---|---|---|---|---|---|---|
| 1 | Italy | Pretoria, South Africa | Loftus Versfeld Stadium | 2025 Italy tour of South Africa | 5 July 2025 | Win | 42–24 |
