= Grant Williams (rugby union) =

South African rugby union player

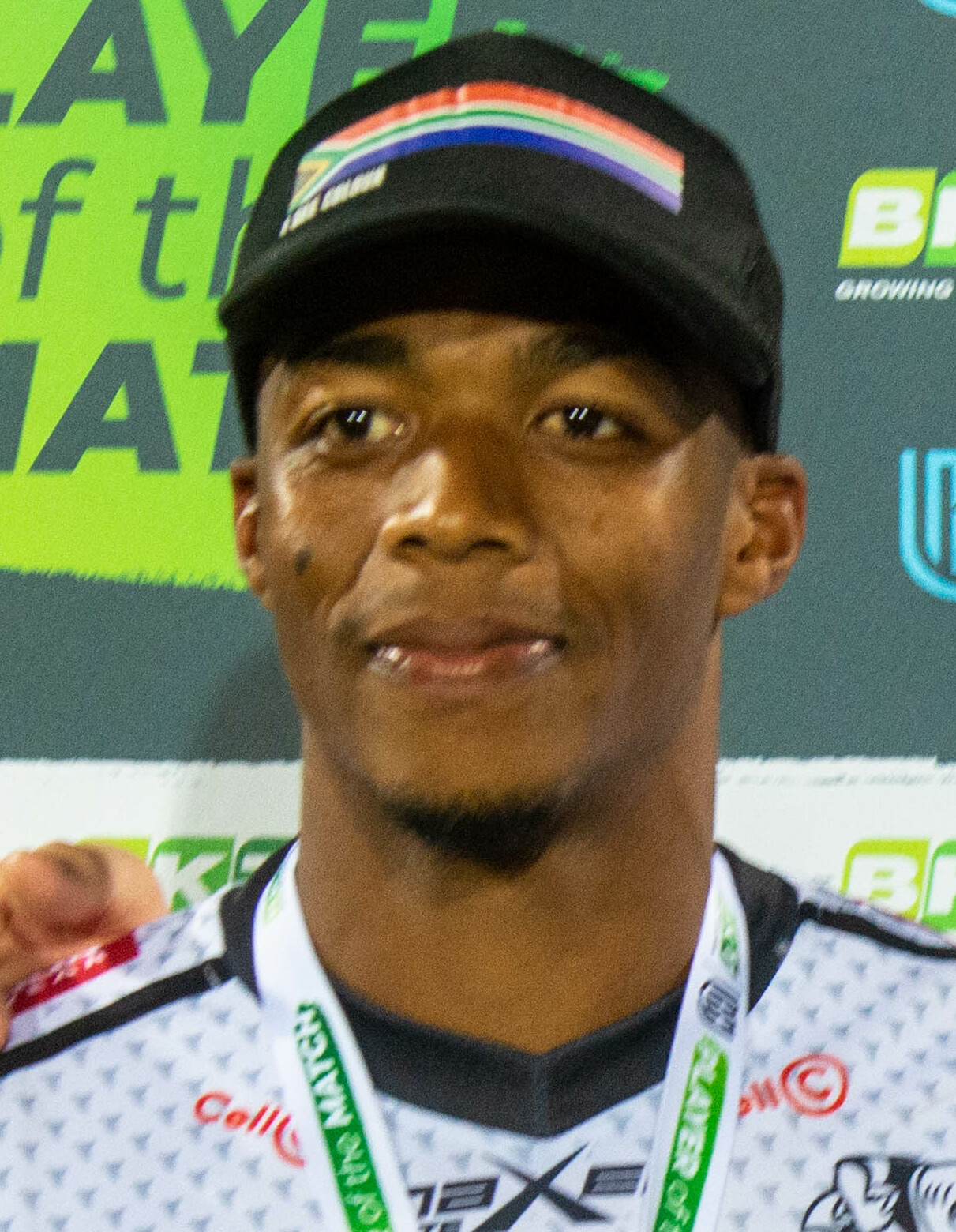
- Williams in 2022
- Born: 22 July 1996 (age 30) Paarl, Western Cape, South Africa
- Height: 1.74 m (5 ft 8 1/2 in)
- Weight: 80 kg (180 lb)
- School: Paarl Gimnasium

Rugby union career
- Position: Scrum-half / Wing
- Current team: Kobelco Steelers
Youth career
- 2017: Sharks
Amateur team(s)
| Years | Team | Apps | (Points) |
| 2017 | College Rovers | 2 | (5) |
Senior career
| Years | Team | Apps | (Points) |
| 2018–2026 | Sharks | 81 | (125) |
| 2018–2019 | Sharks XV | 9 | (25) |
| 2018–2026 | Sharks (Currie Cup) | 8 | (15) |
| 2026– | Kobelco Steelers | | |
- Correct as of 26 July 2026
International career
| Years | Team | Apps | (Points) |
| 2022– | South Africa | 31 | (40) |
- Correct as of 26 July 2026
Medal record
Men's Rugby union
Representing South Africa
Rugby World Cup
| Gold medal – first place | 2023 France | Squad |

Grant Williams (born 22 July 1996) is a South African professional rugby union player who plays as a scrum-half or wing for the Sharks in the United Rugby Championship and for the South Africa national team. Williams is noted for his exceptional pace and finishing ability.

== Early life ==
Williams was born in Paarl and attended Paarl Gimnasium. He did not secure an immediate professional contract after finishing school and instead, he enrolled at the Stellenbosch Rugby Academy before moving to Durban, where he played club rugby for College Rovers. His performances at amateur level eventually led to a professional opportunity with the Sharks.

== Club career ==
Williams moved to Durban in 2017, where he joined the amateur club side College Rovers and impressed sufficiently to be brought into the Sharks team in early 2018 as injury cover for Louis Schreuder.

He made his Super Rugby debut in February 2018, appearing as a late bench replacement for Michael Claassens in the opening match of the 2018 season against the Lions, replacing Cameron Wright in the 60th minute. This was to be his only Super Rugby appearance of the 2018 campaign, though he did appear for the Sharks XV in the SuperSport Rugby Challenge.

Williams featured intermittently for the Sharks across Super Rugby and the Currie Cup during 2019 and 2020, though at scrum-half he remained behind Louis Schreuder, Sanele Nohamba and Jaden Hendrikse in the pecking order. During this period, he made 8 Currie Cup appearances for the union. His increased involvement in the 2021 Currie Cup, Rainbow Cup and inaugural United Rugby Championship seasons saw him become a regular member of the match-day squad, leading to his first national team call-up in August 2021 as injury cover for Jaden Hendrikse.

From 2022 onward, Williams established himself as a core member of the Sharks’ senior team. He was part of the side that won the EPCR Challenge Cup in 2024, starting in the final in London as the Sharks claimed their first European title.

In the 2024–25 URC season Williams struggled with a neck injury that ruled him out for approximately three months during the latter stages of the campaign.

== International ==
In August 2021, Williams was called up to the Springbok squad as an injury replacement for fellow Sharks scrum-half Jaden Hendrikse. He made his international debut off the bench on 9 July 2022 in a 13–12 defeat to Wales in Bloemfontein. Williams was part of South Africa’s victorious 2023 Rugby World Cup squad and later featured in the teams that won the 2024 Rugby Championship and 2025 Rugby Championship.

== Honours ==
Sharks

- Currie Cup:
  - Winner: 2018
- EPCR Challenge Cup:
  - Winner: 2024

South Africa

- Rugby World Cup:
  - Winner: 2023
- The Rugby Championship:
  - Winner: 2024, 2025

== Statistics ==
=== Test match record ===
As of 8 November 2026

| Opponent | P | W | D | L | Try | Pts | %Won |
|---|---|---|---|---|---|---|---|
| Argentina | 2 | 2 | 0 | 0 | 0 | 0 | 100 |
| Australia | 5 | 4 | 0 | 1 | 0 | 0 | 80 |
| England | 2 | 2 | 0 | 0 | 2 | 10 | 100 |
| France | 1 | 1 | 0 | 0 | 1 | 5 | 100 |
| Georgia | 1 | 1 | 0 | 0 | 0 | 0 | 100 |
| Ireland | 3 | 2 | 0 | 1 | 0 | 0 | 66.67 |
| Italy | 3 | 3 | 0 | 0 | 2 | 10 | 100 |
| Japan | 1 | 1 | 0 | 0 | 0 | 0 | 100 |
| New Zealand | 6 | 3 | 0 | 3 | 1 | 5 | 50 |
| Romania | 1 | 1 | 0 | 0 | 2 | 10 | 100 |
| Scotland | 3 | 3 | 0 | 0 | 0 | 0 | 100 |
| Tonga | 1 | 1 | 0 | 0 | 0 | 0 | 100 |
| Wales | 3 | 2 | 0 | 1 | 0 | 0 | 66.67 |
| Total | 32 | 26 | 0 | 6 | 8 | 40 | 81.25 |

=== International tries ===
As of 4 July 2026

| Try | Opposing team | Location | Venue | Competition | Date | Result | Score |
|---|---|---|---|---|---|---|---|
| 1 | Romania | Bordeaux, France | Nouveau Stade de Bordeaux | 2023 Rugby World Cup | 17 September 2023 | Win | 76–0 |
| 2 | Romania | Bordeaux, France | Nouveau Stade de Bordeaux | 2023 Rugby World Cup | 17 September 2023 | Win | 76–0 |
| 3 | New Zealand | Johannesburg, South Africa | Ellis Park Stadium | 2024 Rugby Championship | 31 August 2024 | Win | 31–27 |
| 4 | England | London, England | Twickenham Stadium | 2024 end-of-year tests | 16 November 2024 | Win | 20–29 |
| 5 | Italy | Gqeberha, South Africa | Nelson Mandela Bay Stadium | 2025 Italy tour of South Africa | 12 July 2025 | Win | 45–0 |
| 6 | France | Saint-Denis, France | Stade de France | 2025 end-of-year tests | 8 November 2025 | Win | 17–32 |
| 7 | Italy | Turin, Italy | Juventus Stadium | 2025 end-of-year tests | 15 November 2025 | Win | 14–32 |
| 8 | England | Johannesburg, South Africa | Ellis Park Stadium | 2026 Nations Championship | 4 July 2026 | Win | 45–21 |
