= Ox Nché =

South African rugby union player

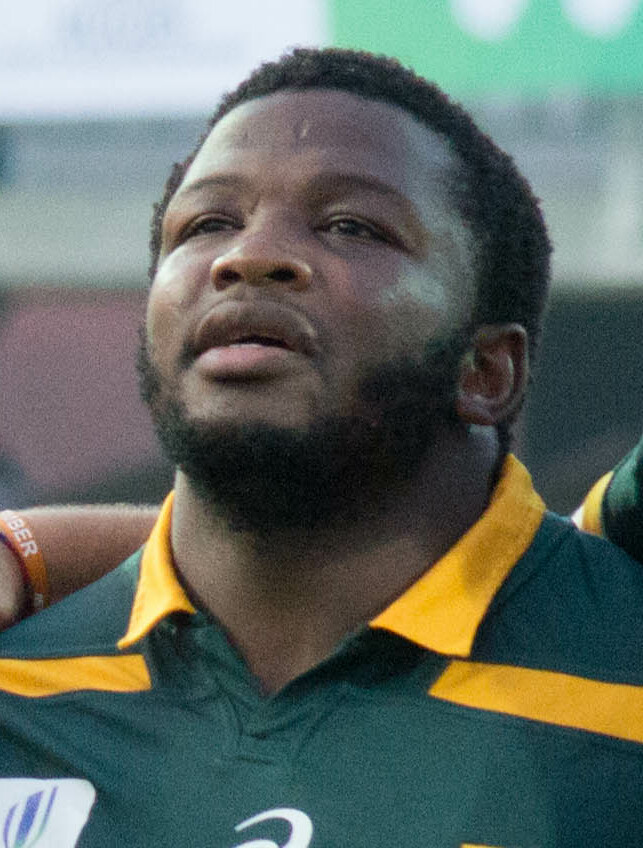
- Nché playing in 2015
- Full name: Retshegofaditswe Nché
- Born: 23 July 1995 (age 31) Thaba 'Nchu, South Africa
- Height: 1.76 m (5 ft 9 1/2 in)
- Weight: 122 kg (19 st 3 lb; 269 lb)
- School: HTS Louis Botha
- University: University of the Free State
- Notable relative: Lezii

Rugby union career
- Position: Prop (Loosehead)
- Current team: Sharks / Sharks (Currie Cup)
Youth career
- 2011–2016: Free State Cheetahs
Amateur team(s)
| Years | Team | Apps | (Points) |
| 2015–2016 | UFS Shimlas | 10 | (0) |
Senior career
| Years | Team | Apps | (Points) |
| 2016–2019 | Cheetahs | 67 | (40) |
| 2016–2018 | Free State XV | 5 | (5) |
| 2016–2019 | Free State Cheetahs | 27 | (20) |
| 2020– | Sharks | 94 | (35) |
| 2020– | Sharks (Currie Cup) | 7 | (0) |
- Correct as of 31 October 2026
International career
| Years | Team | Apps | (Points) |
| 2012–2013 | South Africa Schools | 3 | (0) |
| 2015 | South Africa Under-20 | 5 | (5) |
| 2017 | South Africa 'A' | 2 | (5) |
| 2018– | South Africa | 53 | (5) |
- Correct as of 31 October 2026
Medal record
Men's rugby union
Representing South Africa
Rugby World Cup
| Gold medal – first place | 2023 France | Squad |

Retshegofaditswe 'Tshego' Nché – more commonly referred to as Ox Nché – (born 23 July 1995) is a South African rugby union player for the Sharks in the United Rugby Championship and the South African national team (the Springboks). His regular position is loosehead prop. He is an internationally acclaimed scrummager.

== Club rugby ==
=== Youth (2011–14) ===
Nché first earned provincial selection in 2011, when he was included in the Free State squad that participated at the Under-16 Grant Khomo Week in Queenstown.

In 2012, Nché represented Free State at the premier high school rugby union competition in South Africa – the Under-18 Craven Week competition – held in Port Elizabeth, starting all three of Free State's matches, despite still being in the Under-17 age-group. After the tournament, he was selected in a South African Schools squad that played against France, Wales and England. He was an unused substitute in the first two matches, but started the match against England.

Nché once again played in all three of Free State's matches at the 2013 Under-18 Craven Week competition held in Polokwane, scoring a try in their opening match against Eastern Province. He was once again included in the South African Schools side in 2013, this time starting two matches against England and Wales. He also made three appearances for the Free State U19s during the 2013 Under-19 Provincial Championship.

Nché was a key player for the Free State U19 team in the 2014 Under-19 Provincial Championship, starting all thirteen of their matches in the competition as his side finished second on the log before losing 22–29 to eventual champions Western Province U19 in the semi-finals. Nché scored three tries during the round-robin stage of the competition, scoring in their matches against Western Province U19, Eastern Province U19 and Golden Lions U19.

=== Varsity Cup ===
In 2015, Nché was named in the UFS Shimlas squad for the 2015 Varsity Cup competition. He started the competition as a reserve, playing off the bench on five occasions before being named in the starting line-up for the first time in their final regular season match against NWU Pukke. He retained his starting spot for their 21–10 victory over defending champions UCT Ikey Tigers in the semi-final and also started the final, helping UFS Shimlas to a 63–33 victory against NWU Pukke to win the competition for the first time in their history.

== International ==
Nché was named in a 37-man South Africa Under-20 training squad and played for them in a 31–24 victory in a friendly match against a Varsity Cup Dream Team that was named at the conclusion of the 2015 Varsity Cup competition. He was then named in their squad to tour Argentina for a two-match series as preparation for the 2015 World Rugby Under 20 Championship. He started their 25–22 victory over Argentina in the first match, but did not feature in their 39–28 win in the second match four days later.

Upon the team's return, Nché was named in the final squad for the 2015 World Rugby Under 20 Championship. He started all three of their matches in Pool B of the competition; a 33–5 win against hosts Italy, a 40–8 win against Samoa and a 46–13 win over Australia. Nché scored one of six tries in their match against Australia to help South Africa finish top of Pool B to qualify for the semi-finals with the best record pool stage of all the teams in the competition. Nché started their semi-final match against England, but could not prevent them losing 20–28 to be eliminated from the competition by England for the second year in succession. He started their third-place play-off match against France, helping South Africa to a 31–18 win to win the bronze medal.

Nché made his senior debut for South Africa on 2 June 2018, starting at loosehead prop in a 22–20 defeat to Wales in Washington, D.C. He returned to Test rugby on 2 July 2021 in a 40–9 win over Georgia in Pretoria. He started the first Test against the British & Irish Lions later that month and made eight Test appearances in 2021.

At the 2023 Rugby World Cup, Nché came off the bench in South Africa's 16–15 semi-final win over England. Agence France-Presse reported that South Africa won four scrum penalties while he was on the field, including the one Handré Pollard converted to win the match. Nché's decisive scrummaging contribution to the semi-final against England was subsequently featured prominently in the fourth episode of Chasing the Sun 2, the 2024 documentary series chronicling South Africa's successful defence of the Rugby World Cup. Nché also appeared as a replacement in the 12–11 win over New Zealand in the final. He started the victories over Argentina that secured the 2024 and 2025 Rugby Championship titles.

Mike Tindall and Bismarck du Plessis selected Nché at loosehead in their 2025 World XV, citing his power in the scrum and his work in open play. In August 2026, Planet Rugby ranked him first among specialist looseheads and second among all props, behind Thomas du Toit. In November 2026, his Springbok teammate Eben Etzebeth told RugbyPass that he was unsure whether there had ever been a stronger loosehead.

World Rugby shortlisted Nché for the 2025 World Rugby Men's 15s Player of the Year award, which went to Malcolm Marx, and named Nché at loosehead in its 2025 Men's 15s Dream Team. He earned his 50th Test cap as a replacement in the 33–26 win over New Zealand in Cape Town on 29 August 2026. He scored his first Test try in the 42–38 defeat to Australia in Perth on 27 September and earned his 56th cap when he started in the 20–17 defeat to Ireland in Dublin on 21 November.

=== Test Match record ===
As of 15 November 2026

| Against | P | W | D | L | Tri | Pts | %Won |
|---|---|---|---|---|---|---|---|
| Argentina | 6 | 5 | 0 | 1 | 0 | 0 | 83.33 |
| Australia | 8 | 4 | 0 | 4 | 1 | 5 | 50 |
| British & Irish Lions | 1 | 0 | 0 | 1 | 0 | 0 | 0 |
| England | 5 | 4 | 0 | 1 | 0 | 0 | 80 |
| France | 3 | 1 | 0 | 2 | 0 | 0 | 33.33 |
| Georgia | 1 | 1 | 0 | 0 | 0 | 0 | 100 |
| Ireland | 5 | 1 | 0 | 4 | 0 | 0 | 50 |
| Italy | 4 | 4 | 0 | 0 | 0 | 0 | 100 |
| Japan | 1 | 1 | 0 | 0 | 0 | 0 | 100 |
| New Zealand | 12 | 9 | 0 | 3 | 0 | 0 | 75 |
| Romania | 1 | 1 | 0 | 0 | 0 | 0 | 100 |
| Scotland | 3 | 3 | 0 | 0 | 0 | 0 | 100 |
| Tonga | 1 | 1 | 0 | 0 | 0 | 0 | 100 |
| Wales | 5 | 4 | 0 | 1 | 0 | 0 | 80 |
| Total | 56 | 39 | 0 | 17 | 1 | 5 | 69.64 |

Pld = Games Played, W = Games Won, D = Games Drawn, L = Games Lost, Tri = Tries Scored, Pts = Points Scored

=== International tries ===
As of 27 September 2026

| Try | Opposing team | Location | Venue | Competition | Date | Result | Score |
|---|---|---|---|---|---|---|---|
| 1 | Australia | Perth, Australia | Perth Stadium | 2026 test | 27 September 2026 | Loss | 42–38 |

== Honours ==
- 2023 - “Tlotlo ya Morafe wa Barolong boo-Seleka” (Honour of the Barolong Tribe in Nation) by Kgosi Gaboilelwe Moroka in Barolong, Thaba 'Nchu.
- 2023 Rugby World Cup winner
- 2023–24 EPCR Challenge Cup winner
- 2024 Rugby Championship winner
- 2025 Rugby Championship winner
