= Marco van Staden =

South African rugby union player

- Full name: Marco Gerhardt van Staden
- Born: 25 August 1995 (age 31) Krugersdorp, South Africa
- Height: 1.84 m (6 ft 1/2 in)
- Weight: 112 kg (247 lb; 17 st 9 lb)
- School: Hoërskool Bekker, Magaliesburg
- University: University of Pretoria

Rugby union career
- Position: Flanker/ Hooker
- Current team: Bulls / Blue Bulls
Youth career
- 2014: Limpopo Blue Bulls
- 2015–2016: Blue Bulls
Amateur team(s)
Years	Team	Apps	(Points)
2016–2017	UP Tuks		
Senior career
Years	Team	Apps	(Points)
2017–2018	Blue Bulls XV	10	(0)
2017–2021	Blue Bulls	18	(25)
2018–2021	Bulls	41	(30)
2021–2022	Leicester Tigers	8	(0)
2022–	Bulls	32	
2023–	Blue Bulls	6	
- Correct as of 23 November 2024
International career
Years	Team	Apps	(Points)
2019–	South Africa	32	(15)
- Correct as of 9 October 2021
Medal record
Men's Rugby union
Representing South Africa
Rugby World Cup
Gold medal – first place	2023 France	Squad

Marco Gerhardt van Staden (born 25 August 1995) is a South African professional rugby union player formerly of Leicester Tigers in Premiership Rugby, England's top domestic tier of rugby. He also previously played for the Bulls in Super Rugby, the Blue Bulls in the Currie Cup and the Blue Bulls XV in the Rugby Challenge. His regular position is flanker.

Van Staden started his 2018 rugby season playing in Varsity Cup, he earned himself his first Blue Bulls cap, and becoming a regular starter throughout the 2018 season campaign. Later that year Van Staden made his international debut for the Springboks (18 August 2018) as a replacement against Argentina. He is the first player in South African rugby history to play university, franchise and country in a single year.

== International statistics ==
=== Test Match record ===
As of 27 September 2026

Against	P	W	D	L	Tri	Pts	%Won
Argentina	7	6	0	1	0	0	85.71
Australia	9	5	0	4	1	5	55.56
British & Irish Lions	2	2	0	0	0	0	100
England	2	2	0	0	0	0	100
Ireland	3	1	0	2	0	0	33.33
Italy	3	3	0	0	2	10	100
New Zealand	4	1	0	3	0	0	25
Romania	1	1	0	0	0	0	100
Scotland	2	2	0	0	0	0	100
Tonga	1	1	0	0	1	5	100
Wales	4	4	0	0	0	0	100
Total	38	28	0	10	4	20	73.68

Pld = Games Played, W = Games Won, D = Games Drawn, L = Games Lost, Tri = Tries Scored, Pts = Points Scored

=== International tries ===
As of 18 November 2025

Try	Opposing team	Location	Venue	Competition	Date	Result	Score
1	Tonga	Marseille, France	Stade Vélodrome	2023 Rugby World Cup Pool B	1 October 2023	Win	49–18
2	Australia	Perth, Australia	Perth Stadium	2024 Rugby Championship	17 August 2024	Win	12–30
3	Italy	Pretoria, South Africa	Loftus Versfeld Stadium	2025 Italy tour of South Africa	5 July 2025	Win	42–24
4	Italy	Turin, Italy	Juventus Stadium	2025 end-of-year test	15 November 2025	Win	14–32

== Honours ==
- Super Rugby Unlocked 2020
- Currie Cup winner 2020–21
- Gallagher Premiership Winner 2021–22
- 2025 Rugby Championship winner
