= Pedro Delgado (rugby union) =

Argentine rugby union player (born 1997)

- Full name: Pedro Delgado Ibañez
- Born: 1 September 1997 (age 29) Santiago del Estero, Argentina
- Height: 185 cm (6 ft 1 in)
- Weight: 135 kg (298 lb; 21 st 4 lb)

Rugby union career
- Position: Prop
- Current team: Harlequins
Senior career
Years	Team	Apps	(Points)
2023–2025	Dogos XV		
2025–	Harlequins	3	(0)
- Correct as of 9 November 2025
International career
Years	Team	Apps	(Points)
2024–	Argentina	8	(5)
- Correct as of 9 November 2025

Pedro Delgado (born 1 September 1997) is an Argentine rugby union player, who plays for Prem Rugby club Harlequins and Argentina national team. His preferred position is prop.

== Early career ==
Delgado was born in Santiago del Estero and played his club rugby for Old Lions Rugby Club in the same city, joining in 2015. His performances for Old Lions helped the side win the Torneo Regional in 2023.

== Club career ==
Delgado's first professional experience came for the Dogos XV in Super Rugby Americas, joining the side in 2023. His was a member of the side that won the competition in 2024.

In August 2025, Delgado signed for Prem Rugby club Harlequins ahead of the 2025–26 season. In October 2025, he made his debut for the club in a 20–14 victory against Saracens.

== International career ==
Delgado made his debut for the Argentina national side in 2024, coming on as a replacement against South Africa in his home city. In August 2025, he was again named in the squad for the 2025 Rugby Championship. In October 2025, he scored his first international try in a 52–28 victory against Wales during the 2025 Autumn Nations Series.
