= Nick Frost (rugby union) =

Australian rugby union player

- Born: 10 October 1999 (age 27) Sydney, New South Wales, Australia
- Height: 206 cm (6 ft 9 in)
- Weight: 120 kg (260 lb; 18 st 13 lb)
- School: Knox Grammar School

Rugby union career
- Position: Lock
- Current team: ACT Brumbies
Youth career
- Hornsby Lions
- –2017: Knox Grammar School
- 2017–2019: Crusaders Academy
Senior career
Years	Team	Apps	(Points)
2019	Canberra Vikings	9	(0)
- Correct as of 4 November 2019
Super Rugby
Years	Team	Apps	(Points)
2020–	ACT Brumbies	90	(40)
- Correct as of 5 June 2026
International career
Years	Team	Apps	(Points)
2017	Australian Schoolboys	2	(0)
2019	Australia U20	5	(10)
2022–	Australia	37	(5)
- Correct as of 16 August 2025
Medal record
Men's rugby union
Representing Australia
Junior World Cup
Runner-up	2019 Argentina

Nicholas Frost (born 10 October 1999) is an Australian professional rugby union player who plays for the ACT Brumbies in the Super Rugby. His playing position is lock in the forward pack. He signed for the ACT Brumbies in 2020.

== Early life and junior rugby ==
Frost was born in 1999 in Sydney in the Australian state of New South Wales. He began his junior rugby at the Hornsby Lions in Sydney before playing at Knox Grammar School. While at Knox Grammar School, Frost, in his final year of school, was selected in the 2017 Australian Schoolboys team. He made two appearances, starting against both Fijian Schools and New Zealand Schoolboys.

In October 2017 it was reported by Fox Sports Australia that Frost had rejected interest by Australian Super Rugby team, the New South Wales Waratahs, to sign a three-year development contract with the Crusaders in New Zealand. Frost, who was 18 years and 3 days old, became the youngest Australian to be signed to the Crusaders. Frost was also reportedly sought after by various Australian Football League (AFL) clubs.

== Career ==
=== ACT Brumbies ===
In early 2019, after spending over 12 months with the Crusaders Academy, Frost was acquired by the ACT Brumbies on a three-year deal. Although he didn't play a Super Rugby match throughout the year, he made nine appearances for the Canberra Vikings in the 2019 National Rugby Championship (NRC).

Frost made his debut for the Brumbies in February 2020 and went on to a total of eight appearances that year. He continued to be a mainstay in the Brumbies in the subsequent years, making 42 more appearances in the 2021–2023 Super Rugby seasons. Highlights include a two-try night against the Hurricanes in 2023.

== International career ==
Frost made his debut for the Wallabies in July 2022 against England, earning a further 8 caps that year and Rugby Australia's Rookie of the Year award.

In August 2023 Frost was named in the Wallabies squad for the 2023 Rugby World Cup.
