= Joel Sclavi =

Argentine rugby player (born 1994)

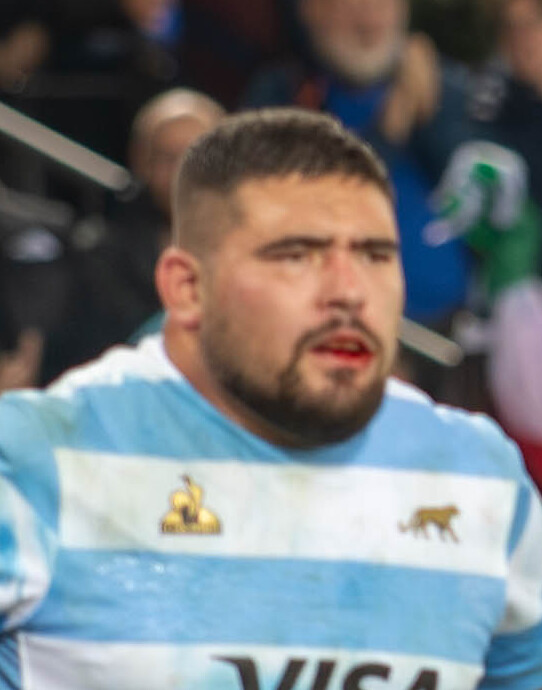
- Sclavi in 2024
- Born: 25 June 1994 (age 32) Mar del Plata, Argentina
- Height: 1.88 m (6 ft 2 in)
- Weight: 137 kg (302 lb; 21 st 8 lb)

Rugby union career
- Position: Prop
- Current team: Leicester Tigers
Senior career
Years	Team	Apps	(Points)
2016	Pau	2	(0)
2017–2019	Soyaux Angoulême	39	(5)
2020	Jaguares	6	(0)
2021	Jaguares XV	10	(0)
2022−2026	La Rochelle	41	(35)
2026–	Leicester Tigers	3	(0)
- Correct as of 18 October 2026
International career
Years	Team	Apps	(Points)
2022−	Argentina	32	(20)
- Correct as of 28 August 2023

Joel Sclavi (born 25 June 1994) is an Argentine professional rugby union player who plays as a prop for Premiership Rugby club Leicester Tigers and the Argentina national team. He was a European Champion at La Rochelle in 2022.

== Club career ==
On 21 November 2019, he was named in the Jaguares squad for the 2020 Super Rugby season.

== Honours ==
La Rochelle

- 1× European Rugby Champions Cup: 2022
