= Ignacio Calles =

Argentine rugby union player

- Born: Ignacio David Calles; 24 October 1995 (age 31) Argentina
- Height: 1.87 m (6 ft 1 1/2 in)
- Weight: 116 kg (18.3 st; 256 lb)

Rugby union career
- Position: Prop
Senior career
Years	Team	Apps	(Points)
2015	Liceo Naval	9	(0)
2018–	Pau	82	(5)
- Correct as of 12 November 2020
International career
Years	Team	Apps	(Points)
2014–2015	Argentina U20s	7	(0)
2016	Argentina XV	3	(0)
2020–	Argentina	3	(0)
- Correct as of 21 September 2024

Ignacio Calles (born 24 October 1995) is an Argentine rugby union player, currently playing for Top 14 side Pau. His preferred position is prop.

== Amateur career ==
Calles started playing rugby at Los Cardos in Tandil, Argentina. After a few years he move to Buenos Aires and played in Liceo Naval (rugby) until 2016 where he signed a contract Section Paloise, the representative team of the city of Pau.

== Professional career ==
Calles signed a new deal with Pau in October 2020, having originally joined the side in 2018. He was named in the Argentine squad for the 2020 Tri Nations Series in October 2020.
