= Aphelele Fassi =

South African rugby union player (born 1998)

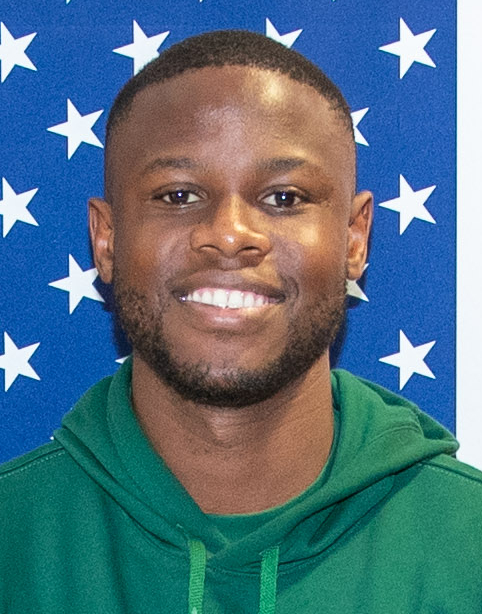
- Fassi playing in 2026
- Full name: Aphelele Onke Okuhle Fassi
- Born: 23 January 1998 (age 28) King William's Town, South Africa
- Height: 1.89 m (6 ft 2 1/2 in)
- Weight: 92 kg (203 lb; 14 st 7 lb)
- School: Dale College Boys' High School

Rugby union career
- Position: Fullback / Wing
- Current team: Toshiba Brave Lupus
Senior career
Years	Team	Apps	(Points)
2018	Sharks XV	8	(24)
2018–2026 2027–	Sharks (Currie Cup)	18	(20)
2019–2026 2027–	Sharks	86	(146)
2026–2027	Toshiba Brave Lupus		
- Correct as of 30 March 2024
International career
Years	Team	Apps	(Points)
2021–	South Africa	15	(35)
2022–	South Africa 'A'	1	(5)
- Correct as of 13 September 2025

Aphelele Onke Okuhle Fassi (born 23 January 1998) is a South African professional rugby union player for the Sharks in the United Rugby Championship and the Currie Cup. His regular position is wing or fullback.

== Club career ==
His professional career began in 2018 with the Natal Sharks in the Currie Cup. He was praised for his speed and technique and won the championship in his first season.

== International career ==
In June 2021, Aphelele Fassi was selected by the Springboks by Jacques Nienaber to prepare for the British Lions' tour of South Africa. He gets his first cap on July 2, 2021 against Georgia in Pretoria. This is his first international try. Later that year, he was selected to play in the Rugby Championship and played a match against Argentina, scoring another try. After his first international season, he is elected best young South African player for the year 2021.

== Honours ==
South Africa

- 2025 Rugby Championship winner

== Test match record ==
As of 27 September 2026

Opponent	P	W	D	L	Try	Pts	%Won
Argentina	4	3	0	1	4	20	75
Australia	4	2	0	2	1	5	50
England	1	1	0	0	0	0	100
Georgia	2	2	0	0	1	5	100
New Zealand	2	2	0	0	0	0	100
Portugal	1	1	0	0	0	0	100
Scotland	1	1	0	0	0	0	100
Wales	4	3	0	1	1	5	75
Total	19	15	0	4	7	35	78.95

== International tries ==
As of 23 November 2024

Try	Opposing team	Location	Venue	Competition	Date	Result	Score
1	Georgia	Pretoria, South Africa	Loftus Versfeld Stadium	2021 July tests	2 July 2021	Win	40–9
2	Argentina	Gqeberha, South Africa	Nelson Mandela Bay Stadium	2021 Rugby Championship	14 August 2021	Win	32–12
3	Australia	Perth, Australia	Perth Stadium	2024 Rugby Championship	17 August 2024	Win	12–30
4	Argentina	Santiago del Estero, Argentina	Estadio Único Madre de Ciudades	2024 Rugby Championship	21 September 2024	Loss	29–28
5	Argentina	Mbombela, South Africa	Mbombela Stadium	2024 Rugby Championship	28 September 2024	Win	48–7
6	Argentina	Mbombela, South Africa	Mbombela Stadium	2024 Rugby Championship	28 September 2024	Win	48–7
7	Wales	Cardiff, Wales	Millennium Stadium	2024 Autumn Nations Series	23 November 2024	Win	12–45
