= Gerhard Steenekamp =

South African rugby union player

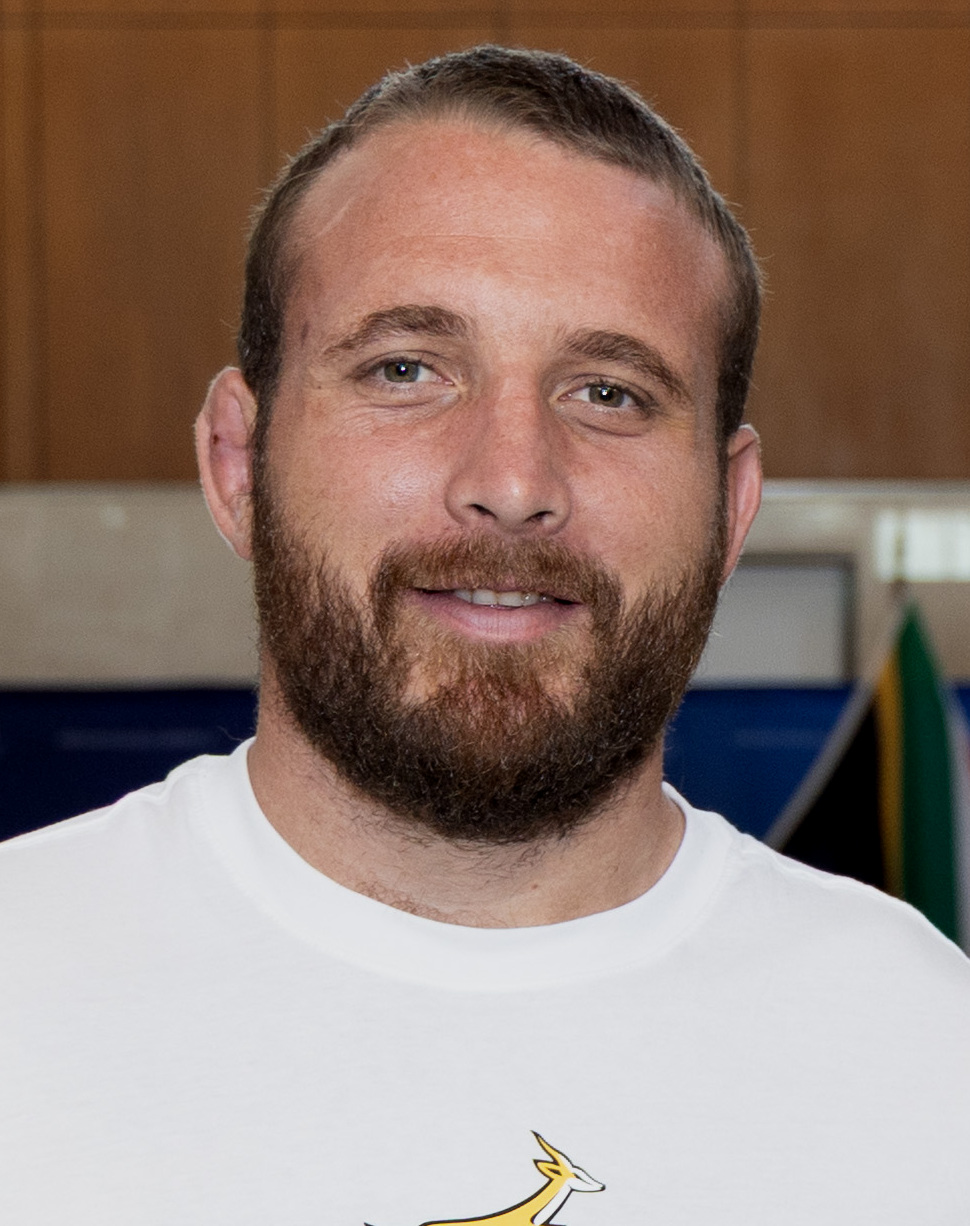
- Steenekamp in 2026
- Full name: Gerhardus Cornelis Steenekamp
- Born: 9 April 1997 (age 29) Potchefstroom, South Africa
- Height: 1.94 m (6 ft 4 1/2 in)
- Weight: 128 kg (282 lb)
- School: Potchefstroom Gimnasium

Rugby union career
- Position: Prop
- Current team: Bulls / Blue Bulls
Senior career
Years	Team	Apps	(Points)
2020–present	Bulls	86	(10)
2020–	Blue Bulls	15	(5)
- Correct as of 23 July 2022
International career
Years	Team	Apps	(Points)
2017	South Africa U20		
2022-	South Africa	14	(5)
- Correct as of 24 May 2025

Gerhardus Cornelis Steenekamp (born 9 April 1997) is a South African rugby union player for the Bulls in the United Rugby Championship . and the Blue Bulls in the Currie Cup. His regular position is loosehead prop.

He made his Super Rugby debut while for the Bulls in their round 2 match against the Stormers in February 2020, coming on as a replacement prop. He signed for the Bulls Super Rugby side for the 2020 Super Rugby season.

== Honours ==
- Currie Cup winner 2021
- Pro14 Rainbow Cup runner-up 2021
- United Rugby Championship runner-up 2021-22
- Vodacom Bulls Vodacom United Rugby Championship Player of the Year: 2022-23
- The Rugby Championship winner 2024

== International statistics ==
=== Test Match record ===
As of 15 November 2026

Against	P	W	D	L	Tri	Pts	%Won
Argentina	4	3	0	1	0	0	75
Australia	1	1	0	0	0	0	100
England	2	2	0	0	0	0	100
France	2	1	0	1	0	0	50
Ireland	3	2	0	1	0	0	66.67
Italy	2	2	0	0	0	0	100
Japan	1	1	0	0	0	0	100
New Zealand	6	5	0	1	0	0	83.33
Scotland	1	1	0	0	0	0	100
Wales	3	3	0	0	2	10	100
Total	25	21	0	3	2	10	84

Pld = Games Played, W = Games Won, D = Games Drawn, L = Games Lost, Tri = Tries Scored, Pts = Points Scored

=== International tries ===
As of 29 November 2025

Try	Opposing team	Location	Venue	Competition	Date	Result	Score
1	Wales	Cardiff, Wales	Millennium Stadium	2024 end-of-year tests	23 November 2024	Win	12–45
2	Wales	Cardiff, Wales	Millennium Stadium	2025 end-of-year tests	29 November 2025	Win	0–73
