= Salmaan Moerat =

South Africa international rugby union player

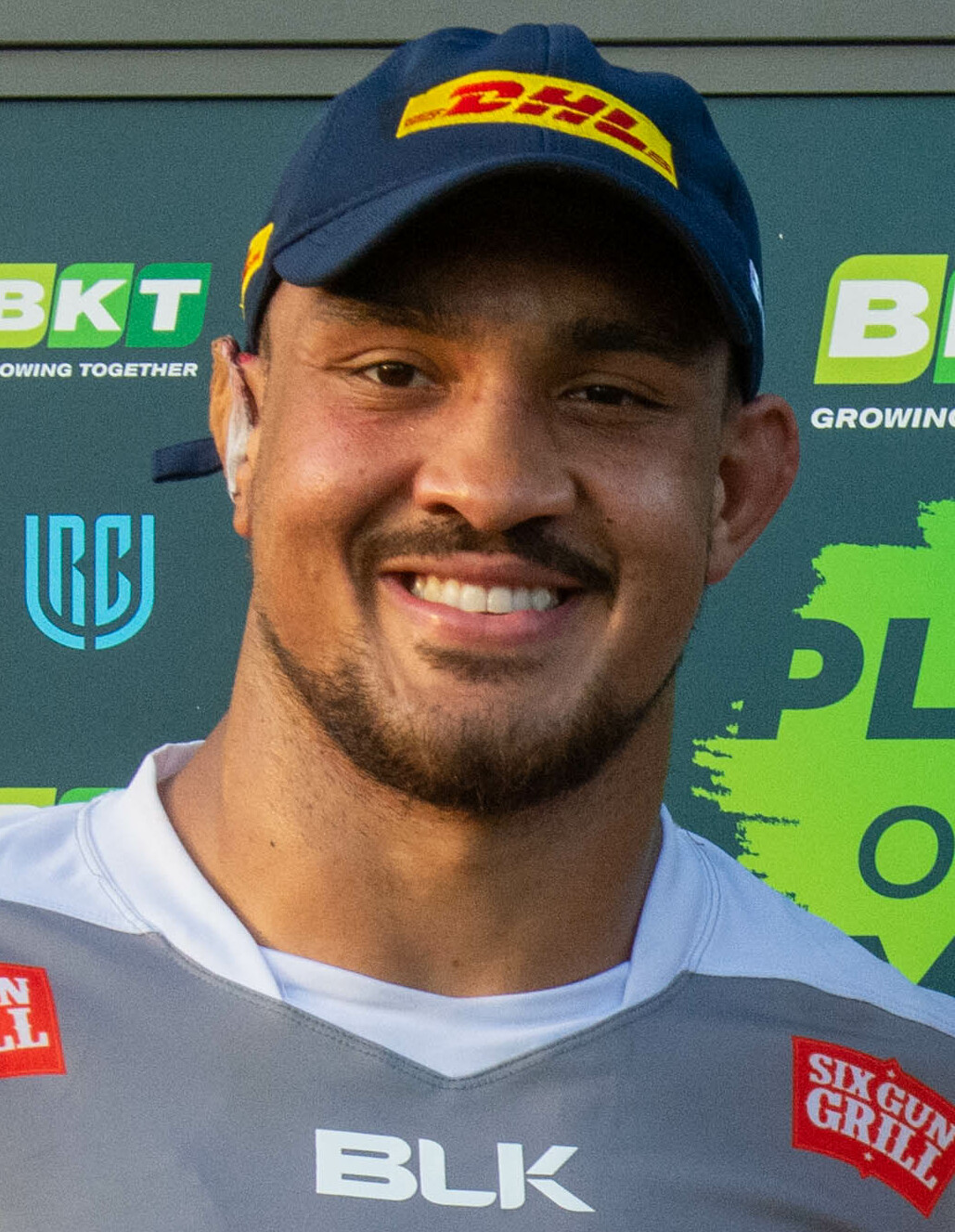
- Moerat in 2022
- Born: 6 March 1998 (age 28) Paarl, South Africa
- Height: 2.00 m (6 ft 6 1/2 in)
- Weight: 116 kg (256 lb; 18 st 4 lb)
- School: Paarl Boys' High School

Rugby union career
- Position: Lock
- Current team: Stormers / Western Province
Youth career
- 2011: Boland Cavaliers
- 2014–2019: Western Province
Senior career
Years	Team	Apps	(Points)
2018–2026	Stormers	73	(10)
2018–2026	Western Province	31	(0)
2018–present	Stade Rochelais	3	(5)
- Correct as of 6 November 2026
International career
Years	Team	Apps	(Points)
2015–2016	South Africa Schools		
2017–2018	South Africa Under-20	10	(0)
2022–present	South Africa	11	(0)
- Correct as of 1 October 2024

Salmaan Moerat (born 6 March 1998) is a South African professional rugby union player who currently plays for the Stormers in United Rugby Championship and Western Province in the Currie Cup and in the Rugby Challenge. His regular position is lock.

Moerat has captained the DHL Stormers, including being the first Stormers captain in the United Rugby Championship (URC) in 2021.

Moerat became the first ever Muslim player to lead the Springboks in a Test match in the match against Portugal at Free State Stadium on 20 July 2024.

== Statistics ==
=== Test match record ===
As of 12 July 2025

Opponent	P	W	D	L	Try	Pts	%Won
Argentina	1	0	0	1	0	0	0
Australia	2	2	0	0	0	0	100
Ireland	2	1	0	1	0	0	50
Italy	2	2	0	0	0	0	100
Portugal	1	1	0	0	0	0	100
New Zealand	1	1	0	0	0	0	100
Wales	2	2	0	0	0	0	100
Total	11	9	0	2	0	0	81.82
