= 2026 Nations Championship Southern Hemisphere Series =

International rugby union tournament

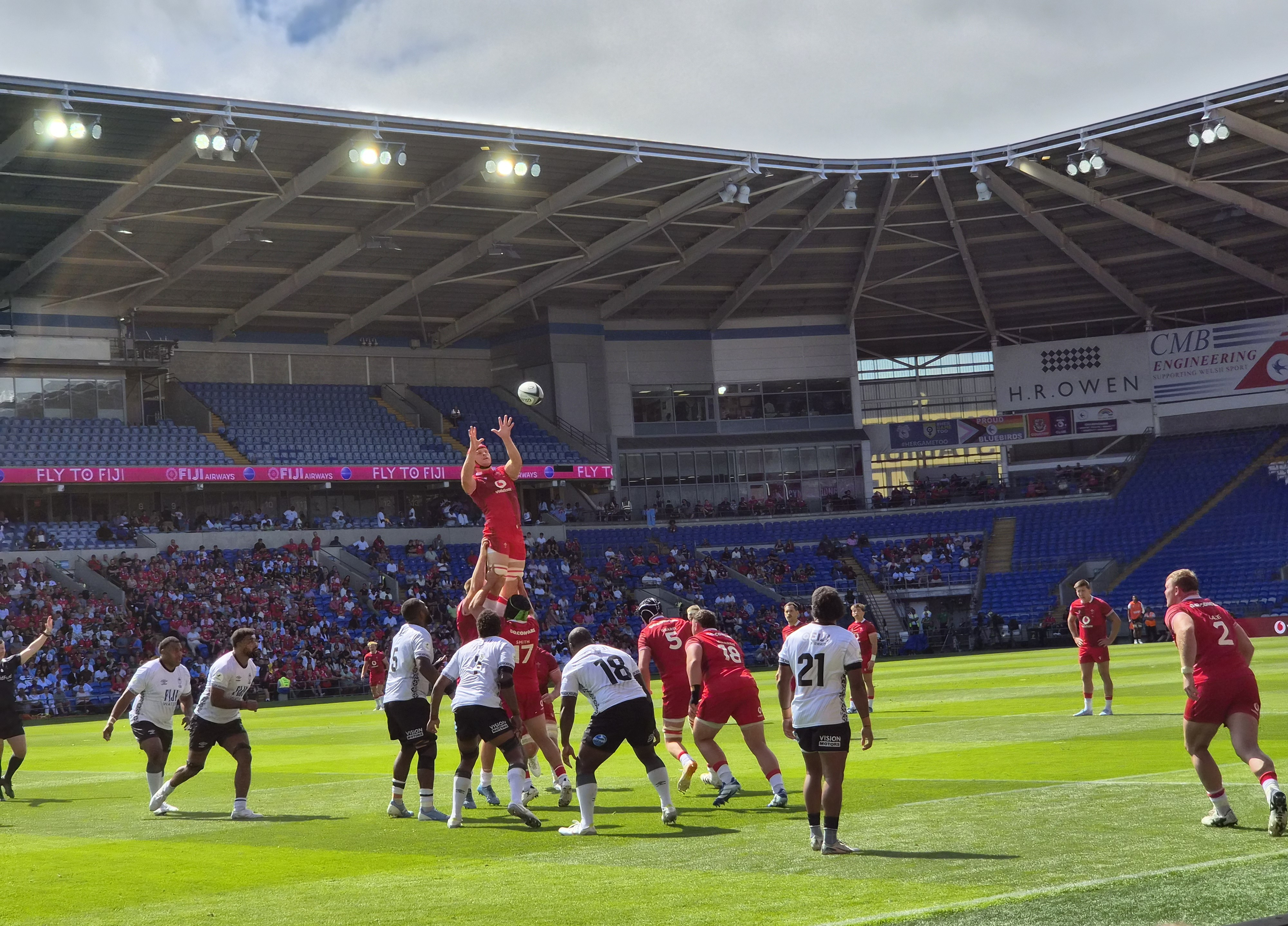
Wales v Fiji at Cardiff City Stadium

The 2026 Nations Championship Southern Hemisphere Series was the first phase of matches (rounds 1–3) of the inaugural edition of the Nations Championship, a biennial international men's rugby union competition between the Six Nations sides, SANZAAR, Fiji and Japan.

The Southern Hemisphere Series took place between 4 July and 18 July, during the July International window. The matches replaced the traditional test series' between the travelling Six Nations sides to the SANZAAR nations and surrounding Tier 2 nations in the Pacific Islands, North America and Japan.

== Championship division: Tables ==
The below shows the tables for the two conferences for the Southern Hemisphere Series.

=== Northern Hemisphere ===
Pos	Team	Pld	W	D	L	PF	PA	PD	TF	TA	TB	LB	Pts
1	France	3	2	0	1	116	75	+41	16	11	3	1	12
2	Scotland	3	2	0	1	108	97	+11	16	14	3	0	11
3	England	3	2	0	1	125	77	+48	19	11	2	0	10
4	Ireland	3	2	0	1	90	91	−1	13	13	2	0	10
5	Wales	3	1	0	2	60	102	−42	9	15	1	0	5
6	Italy	3	0	0	3	37	131	−94	5	19	0	0	0

Updated to match(es) played on 18 July 2026. Source: Nations Championship Rugby

=== Southern Hemisphere ===
Pos	Team	Pld	W	D	L	PF	PA	PD	TF	TA	TB	LB	Pts
1	South Africa	3	3	0	0	130	49	+81	20	7	3	0	15
2	New Zealand	3	3	0	0	121	70	+51	18	9	3	0	15
3	Australia	3	1	0	2	114	85	+29	18	13	3	1	8
4	Argentina	3	1	0	2	97	99	−2	13	15	2	1	7
5	Japan	3	1	0	2	62	88	−26	7	12	0	0	4
6	Fiji	3	0	0	3	49	145	−96	7	22	0	0	0

Updated to match(es) played on 18 July 2026. Source: Nations Championship Rugby

== Fixtures ==
Southern Hemisphere teams, apart from Fiji, all hosted their matches. All three of Fiji's "home" matches are played in Great Britain. Japan only hosted two of their three matches, with their Round 2 match against Ireland played in Australia.

=== Round 1 ===
==== New Zealand v France ====
4 July 2026
19:10 NZST (UTC+12)

(1 BP) New Zealand	34–32	France (2 BP)
Try: Jordan (2) 8' m, 71' m Lakai 20' c Roigard (2) 40' c, 50' c Con: Love (3/4) 21', 41', 51'; Pen: Love (1/1) 66'	Report	Try: Penaud 2' c Hastoy 47' c Attissogbe 59' m Jalibert 78' c Con: Lucu (2/3) 3', 48'; Hastoy (1/1) 78'; Pen: Lucu (2/2) 15', 30'

Te Kaha, Christchurch
Attendance: 29,152
Referee: Luke Pearce (England)

New Zealand	France

FB	15	Damian McKenzie
RW	14	Will Jordan
OC	13	Quinn Tupaea		(substituted off) 62'
IC	12	Jordie Barrett
LW	11	Caleb Clarke		(substituted off) 69'
FH	10	Ruben Love	(yellow card) 2'
SH	9	Cam Roigard		(substituted off) 76'
N8	8	Ardie Savea (c)
OF	7	Luke Jacobson
BF	6	Peter Lakai		(substituted off) 54'
RL	5	Sam Darry
LL	4	Josh Lord		(substituted off) 69'
TP	3	Fletcher Newell		(substituted off) 54'
HK	2	Codie Taylor		(substituted off) 60'
LP	1	Ethan de Groot		(substituted off) 54'
Substitutions:
HK	16	Asafo Aumua		(substituted on) 60'
PR	17	Xavier Numia		(substituted on) 54'
PR	18	Tyrel Lomax		(substituted on) 54'
LK	19	Jamie Hannah		(substituted on) 69'
BR	20	Wallace Sititi		(substituted on) 54'
SH	21	Cortez Ratima		(substituted on) 76'
CE	22	Billy Proctor		(substituted on) 62'
WG	23	Fehi Fineanganofo		(substituted on) 69'
Coach:
Dave Rennie

FB	15	Max Spring	(substituted off) 7'	(substituted on) 22'	(substituted off) 40'
RW	14	Damian Penaud
OC	13	Fabien Brau-Boirie	(substituted off) 69'
IC	12	Yoram Moefana
LW	11	Théo Attissogbe
FH	10	Matthieu Jalibert
SH	9	Maxime Lucu (c)	(substituted off) 76'
N8	8	Marko Gazzotti
OF	7	Oscar Jégou
BF	6	Pierre Bochaton	(substituted off) 34'
RL	5	Tom Staniforth	(substituted off) 56'
LL	4	Hugo Auradou
TP	3	Demba Bamba	(substituted off) 48'
HK	2	Maxime Lamothe	(substituted off) 63'
LP	1	Jefferson Poirot	(substituted off) 56'
Substitutions:
HK	16	Barnabé Massa	(substituted on) 63'
PR	17	Reda Wardi	(substituted on) 56'
PR	18	Régis Montagne	(substituted on) 48'
LK	19	Mickaël Guillard	(substituted on) 34'
BR	20	Killian Tixeront	(substituted on) 56'
SH	21	Nolann Le Garrec	(substituted on) 76'
FH	22	Antoine Hastoy	(substituted on) 7'	(substituted off) 22'	(substituted on) 40'
CE	23	Nicolas Depoortère	(substituted on) 69'
Coach:
Fabien Galthié

Player of the Match:
Cam Roigard (New Zealand)

Assistant referees:
Christophe Ridley (England)
Katsuki Furuse (Japan)
Television match official:
Marius van der Westhuizen (South Africa)
Foul play review officer:
Ben Whitehouse (Wales)

Notes:

- Fehi Fineanganofo, Jamie Hannah, Xavier Numia (all New Zealand), Barnabé Massa and Tom Staniforth (both France) made their international debuts.
- New Zealand retained the Dave Gallaher Trophy for a record 14th time.

==== Japan v Italy ====
4 July 2026
17:40 JST (UTC+9)

Japan	27–10	Italy
Try: Dearns 10' c Matsunaga 16' c Gunter 46' c Con: Matsunaga (3/3) 11', 16', 47'; Pen: Matsunaga (2/2) 24', 66'	Report	Try: Brex 4' c Con: Garbisi (1/1) 5'; Pen: Garbisi (1/1) 43'

Chichibunomiya Rugby Stadium, Tokyo
Attendance: 21,329
Referee: Nic Berry (Australia)

Japan	Italy

FB	15	Takurō Matsunaga
RW	14	Kazuma Ueda
OC	13	Dylan Riley
IC	12	Yuya Hirose
LW	11	Kippei Ishida
FH	10	Ryūnosuke Itō
SH	9	Naoto Saitō	(substituted off) 74'
N8	8	Jack Cornelsen
OF	7	Kanji Shimokawa	(substituted off) 51'
BF	6	Ben Gunter	(substituted off) 64'
RL	5	Warner Dearns (c)
LL	4	Harry Hockings	(substituted off) 59'
TP	3	Shuhei Takeuchi	(substituted off) 56'
HK	2	Mamoru Harada	(substituted off) 56'
LP	1	Takato Okabe	(substituted off) 59'
Substitutions:
HK	16	Hayate Era	(substituted on) 56'
PR	17	Sojiro Otsuka	(substituted on) 59'
PR	18	Keijiro Tamefusa	(substituted on) 56'
LK	19	Michael Stolberg	(substituted on) 59'
BR	20	Michael Leitch	(substituted on) 51'
BR	21	Tiennan Costley	(substituted on) 64'
SH	22	Itsuki Kamimura	(substituted on) 74'
FH	23	Sam Greene
Coach:
Eddie Jones

FB	15	Lorenzo Pani	(substituted off) 12'
RW	14	Malik Faissal
OC	13	Ignacio Brex	(substituted off) 60'
IC	12	Tommaso Menoncello
LW	11	Monty Ioane
FH	10	Paolo Garbisi
SH	9	Stephen Varney	(substituted off) 60'
N8	8	Lorenzo Cannone
OF	7	Michele Lamaro (c)
BF	6	Alessandro Ortombina	(substituted off) 47'
RL	5	Andrea Zambonin
LL	4	Niccolò Cannone	(substituted off) 66'
TP	3	Marco Riccioni	(substituted off) 60'
HK	2	Tommaso Di Bartolomeo	(substituted off) 47'
LP	1	Danilo Fischetti	(substituted off) 60'
Substitutions:
HK	16	Gianmarco Lucchesi	(substituted on) 47'
PR	17	Mirco Spagnolo	(substituted on) 60'
PR	18	Muhamed Hasa	(substituted on) 60'
LK	19	Riccardo Favretto	(substituted on) 66'
BR	20	Ross Vintcent	(substituted on) 47'
SH	21	Alessandro Fusco	(substituted on) 60'
CE	22	Leonardo Marin	(substituted on) 60'
FH	23	Tommaso Allan	(substituted on) 12'
Coach:
Gonzalo Quesada

Player of the Match:
Ben Gunter (Japan)

Assistant referees:
Luc Ramos (France)
Sam Grove-White (Scotland)
Television match official:
Ian Tempest (England)
Foul play review officer:
Andrew Jackson (England)

Notes:

- Ryūnosuke Itō, Itsuki Kamimura, Sojiro Otsuka, Michael Stolberg (all Japan), Malik Faissal and Alessandro Ortombina (both Italy) made their international debuts.
- This was Japan's largest win (by margin) over Italy and any tier-one team, equaling their previous best of 34–17 against Italy in 2018.

==== Australia v Ireland ====
4 July 2026
20:10 AEST (UTC+10)

(2 BP) Australia	31–33	Ireland (1 BP)
Try: Pietsch 2' m Campbell 13' m Canham 23' c Lonergan 26' c McDermott 52' c Con: Gordon (3/5) 24', 27', 53'	Report	Try: C. Prendergast 9' c van der Flier 18' m Gibson-Park 41' c Keenan 46' c Clarkson 76' c Con: S. Prendergast (4/5) 10', 42', 47', 77'

Sydney Football Stadium, Sydney
Attendance: 41,971
Referee: Ben O'Keeffe (New Zealand)

Australia	Ireland

FB	15	Jock Campbell		(substituted off) 66'
RW	14	Max Jorgensen
OC	13	Joseph Sua'ali'i
IC	12	Len Ikitau
LW	11	Dylan Pietsch
FH	10	Carter Gordon		(substituted off) 57'
SH	9	Ryan Lonergan		(substituted off) 33'
N8	8	Harry Wilson (c)
OF	7	Fraser McReight
BF	6	Rob Valetini		(substituted off) 68'
RL	5	Josh Canham		(substituted off) 58'
LL	4	Jeremy Williams
TP	3	Allan Alaalatoa		(substituted off) 54'
HK	2	Josh Nasser		(substituted off) 54'
LP	1	Angus Bell		(substituted off) 54'
Substitutions:
HK	16	Brandon Paenga-Amosa		(substituted on) 54'
PR	17	James Slipper		(substituted on) 54'
PR	18	Taniela Tupou		(substituted on) 54'
LK	19	Lachlan Shaw	(yellow card) 75'	(substituted on) 58'
BR	20	Tom Hooper		(substituted on) 68'
SH	21	Tate McDermott		(substituted on) 33'
FH	22	Ben Donaldson		(substituted on) 57'
FB	23	Tom Wright		(substituted on) 66'
Coach:
Joe Schmidt

FB	15	Hugo Keenan
RW	14	Jimmy O'Brien
OC	13	Garry Ringrose	(substituted off) 58'
IC	12	Stuart McCloskey
LW	11	Jamie Osborne	(substituted off) 58'
FH	10	Sam Prendergast
SH	9	Jamison Gibson-Park
N8	8	Jack Conan
OF	7	Josh van der Flier	(substituted off) 51'
BF	6	Cian Prendergast	(substituted off) 51'
RL	5	James Ryan
LL	4	Joe McCarthy
TP	3	Tadhg Furlong	(substituted off) 51'
HK	2	Dan Sheehan (c)	(substituted off) 60'
LP	1	Tom O'Toole	(substituted off) 51'	(substituted on) 59'
Substitutions:
HK	16	Rónan Kelleher	(substituted off) 60'
PR	17	Jeremy Loughman	(substituted on) 51'	(substituted off) 59'
PR	18	Tom Clarkson	(substituted on) 51'
LK	19	Tadhg Beirne	(substituted on) 51'
BR	20	Nick Timoney	(substituted on) 51'
SH	21	Craig Casey
FH	22	Ciarán Frawley	(substituted on) 58'
CE	23	Bundee Aki	(substituted on) 58'
Coach:
Andy Farrell

Player of the Match:
Hugo Keenan (Ireland)

Assistant referees:
Karl Dickson (England)
Andrea Piardi (Italy)
Television match official:
Matteo Liperini (Italy)
Foul play review officer:
Glenn Newman (New Zealand)

Notes:

- Lachlan Shaw (Australia) made his international debut.
- Ireland retained the Lansdowne Cup and surpassed Australia for the most trophy wins (nine), and extended their record win-streak over Australia from five to six.
- Ireland's 33 points was the most they had scored against Australia away from home, surpassing the 27 they scored on their 1979 Summer tour.

==== Fiji v Wales ====
4 July 2026
14:10 BST (UTC+1)

Fiji	24–39	Wales (1 BP)
Try: Sowakula 2' c Canakaivata 49' c Ravutaumada 53' c Con: Armstrong-Ravula (3/3) 3', 50', 54'; Pen: Armstrong-Ravula (1/1) 41'	Report	Try: Morgan (2) 10' m, 28' m Carré 43' c Adams 45' m Elias 66' c James 79' c Con: Edwards (1/4) 44'; Costelow (2/2) 67', 80'; Pen: Edwards (1/1) 52'

Cardiff City Stadium, Cardiff (Wales)
Attendance: 16,465
Referee: Eoghan Cross (Ireland)

Fiji	Wales

FB	15	Salesi Rayasi
RW	14	Selestino Ravutaumada	(substituted off) 64'	(substituted on) 75'
OC	13	Semi Radradra	(substituted off) 28'
IC	12	Josua Tuisova
LW	11	Jiuta Wainiqolo
FH	10	Isaiah Armstrong-Ravula		(substituted off) 75'
SH	9	Frank Lomani	(substituted off) 55'
N8	8	Elia Canakaivata
OF	7	Kitione Salawa Jr.
BF	6	Pita Gus Sowakula	(substituted off) 58'
RL	5	Temo Mayanavanua
LL	4	Isoa Nasilasila	(substituted off) 58'
TP	3	Tim Hoyt	(substituted off) 34'
HK	2	Tevita Ikanivere (c)	(substituted off) 70'
LP	1	Eroni Mawi	(substituted off) 55'
Substitutions:
HK	16	Zuriel Togiatama	(substituted on) 70'
PR	17	Livai Natave	(substituted on) 55'
PR	18	Peni Ravai	(substituted on) 34'
LK	19	Mesake Vocevoce	(substituted on) 58'
BR	20	Peceli Yato	(substituted on) 58'
SH	21	Simione Kuruvoli	(substituted on) 55'
CE	22	Vilimoni Botitu	(substituted on) 64'
WG	23	Kalaveti Ravouvou	(substituted on) 28'
Coach:
Senirusi Seruvakula

FB	15	Blair Murray
RW	14	Louis Rees-Zammit	(substituted off) 55'
OC	13	Eddie James
IC	12	Joe Hawkins
LW	11	Josh Adams
FH	10	Dan Edwards	(substituted off) 62'
SH	9	Tomos Williams
N8	8	Aaron Wainwright	(substituted off) 72'
OF	7	Jac Morgan
BF	6	Alex Mann	(substituted off) 3'	(substituted on) 15'	(substituted off) 55'
RL	5	Adam Beard
LL	4	Ben Carter
TP	3	Dillon Lewis	(substituted off) 46'
HK	2	Dewi Lake (c)	(substituted off) 62'
LP	1	Rhys Carré	(substituted off) 46'
Substitutions:
HK	16	Ryan Elias	(substituted on) 62'
PR	17	Nicky Smith	(substituted on) 46'
PR	18	Ben Warren	(substituted on) 46'
BR	19	Taine Plumtree	(substituted on) 72'
BR	20	James Botham	(substituted on) 3'	(substituted off) 15'	(substituted on) 55'
SH	21	Kieran Hardy
FH	22	Sam Costelow	(substituted on) 62'
WG	23	Ellis Mee	(substituted on) 55'
Coach:
Steve Tandy

Player of the Match:
Jac Morgan (Wales)

Assistant referees:
Matthew Carley (England)
Hollie Davidson (Scotland)
Television match official:
Leo Colgan (Ireland)
Foul play review officer:
Mike Adamson (Scotland)

Notes:

- Ben Warren (Wales) made his international debut.

==== South Africa v England ====
4 July 2026
17:40 SAST (UTC+2)

(1 BP) South Africa	45–21	England
Try: T. du Toit 2' m Kolbe 5' c Arendse 11' m Williams 44' c Kriel 56' c Marx 73' c Dixon 78' c Con: Kolbe (5/7) 6', 45', 57', 73', 79'	Report	Try: Genge 35' c Martin 40+1' c Coles 67' c Con: F. Smith (3/3) 35', 40+1, 68'

Ellis Park Stadium, Johannesburg
Attendance: 52,790
Referee: James Doleman (New Zealand)

South Africa	England

FB	15	Damian Willemse
RW	14	Cheslin Kolbe
OC	13	Jesse Kriel
IC	12	Damian de Allende
LW	11	Kurt-Lee Arendse	(yellow card) 28'	(substituted off) 67'
FH	10	Manie Libbok
SH	9	Grant Williams		(substituted off) 67'
N8	8	Jasper Wiese		(substituted off) 65'	(substituted on) 75'
BF	7	Cameron Hanekom		(substituted off) 46'
OF	6	Paul de Villiers		(substituted off) 46'
RL	5	Ruan Nortjé
LL	4	Pieter-Steph du Toit (c)
TP	3	Thomas du Toit		(substituted off) 49'
HK	2	Malcolm Marx
LP	1	Ox Nché		(substituted off) 8'
Substitutions:
HK	16	Jan-Hendrik Wessels		(substituted on) 65'
PR	17	Gerhard Steenekamp		(substituted on) 8'		(substituted off) 65'
PR	18	Zach Porthen		(substituted on) 49'
BR	19	Marco van Staden		(substituted on) 46'
BR	20	Ben-Jason Dixon		(substituted on) 46'
SH	21	Cobus Reinach		(substituted on) 67'
CE	22	André Esterhuizen		(substituted on) 65'	(substituted off) 75'
WG	23	Canan Moodie		(substituted on) 67'
Coach:
Rassie Erasmus

FB	15	Marcus Smith
RW	14	Immanuel Feyi-Waboso
OC	13	Tommy Freeman	(yellow card) 70'
IC	12	Seb Atkinson
LW	11	Cadan Murley		(substituted off) 54'
FH	10	Fin Smith
SH	9	Jack van Poortvliet		(substituted off) 54'
N8	8	Ben Earl
OF	7	Tom Curry		(substituted off) 54'
BF	6	Ollie Chessum
RL	5	George Martin		(substituted off) 58'
LL	4	Alex Coles		(substituted off) 74'
TP	3	Joe Heyes		(substituted off) 65'
HK	2	Jamie George (c)		(substituted off) 56'
LP	1	Ellis Genge		(substituted off) 57'
Substitutions:
HK	16	Luke Cowan-Dickie		(substituted on) 56'
PR	17	Beno Obano		(substituted on) 57'
PR	18	Asher Opoku-Fordjour		(substituted on) 65'
LK	19	Charlie Ewels		(substituted on) 74'
BR	20	Guy Pepper	(yellow card) 72'	(substituted on) 54'
BR	21	Henry Pollock		(substituted on) 58'
SH	22	Alex Mitchell		(substituted on) 54'
FH	23	Henry Slade		(substituted on) 54'
Coach:
Steve Borthwick

Player of the Match:
Damian Willemse (South Africa)

Assistant referees:
Andrew Brace (Ireland)
Pierre Brousset (France)
Television match official:
Richard Kelly (New Zealand)
Foul play review officer:
Olly Hodges (Ireland)

Notes:

- Paul de Villiers (South Africa) made his international debut.
- Cheslin Kolbe and Damian Willemse (both South Africa) earned their 50th test caps.

==== Argentina v Scotland ====
4 July 2026
16:10 ART (UTC-03)

(1 BP) Argentina	38–47	Scotland (1 BP)
Try: Oviedo 6' c Isgró 42' c Rapetti 65' c Cinti 76' c Moyano 78' c Con: Albornoz (5/5) 7', 42', 65', 76', 78'; Pen: Albornoz (1/1) 33'	Report	Try: Tuipulotu 17' c Schoeman 22' m Hutchinson 35' c Brown 51' c Cummings 55' c Hiddleston 68' c Rowe 73' c Con: Burke (3/3) 18', 69', 73'; Jordan (3/4) 37', 52', 56'

Estadio Mario Alberto Kempes, Cordoba
Attendance: 34,560
Referee: Nika Amashukeli (Georgia)

Argentina	Scotland

FB	15	Santiago Carreras
RW	14	Rodrigo Isgró		(substituted off) 45'
OC	13	Lucio Cinti
IC	12	Faustino Sánchez Valarolo		(substituted off) 60'
LW	11	Mateo Carreras
FH	10	Tomás Albornoz
SH	9	Gonzalo García		(substituted off) 15'	(substituted on) 29'	(substituted off) 75'
N8	8	Joaquín Oviedo
OF	7	Santiago Grondona		(substituted off) 60'
BF	6	Pablo Matera		(substituted off) 69'
RL	5	Matías Alemanno		(substituted off) 54'
LL	4	Guido Petti
TP	3	Pedro Delgado		(substituted off) 45'
HK	2	Julián Montoya (c)
LP	1	Mayco Vivas		(substituted off) 45'
Substitutions:
HK	16	Ignacio Ruiz		(substituted on) 69'
PR	17	Boris Wenger		(substituted on) 45'
PR	18	Tomas Rapetti		(substituted on) 45'
LK	19	Franco Molina		(substituted on) 54'
BR	20	Joaquín Moro	(yellow card) 68'	(substituted on) 60'
SH	21	Agustín Moyano		(substituted on) 15'	(substituted off) 29'	(substituted on) 75'
CE	22	Matías Moroni		(substituted on) 60'
WG	23	Bautista Delguy		(substituted on) 45'
Coach:
Felipe Contepomi

FB	15	Kyle Rowe
RW	14	Kyle Steyn	(substituted off) 60'
OC	13	Rory Hutchinson
IC	12	Sione Tuipulotu (c)
LW	11	Jamie Dobie (yellow card) 64'
FH	10	Tom Jordan	(substituted off) 4'	(substituted on) 18'	(substituted off) 66'
SH	9	Ben White	(substituted off) 60'
N8	8	Jack Dempsey	(substituted off) 60'
OF	7	Rory Darge
BF	6	Matt Fagerson
RL	5	Scott Cummings
LL	4	Jonny Gray	(substituted off) 48'
TP	3	Elliot Millar Mills	(substituted off) 13'
HK	2	Ewan Ashman	(substituted off) 60'
LP	1	Pierre Schoeman	(substituted off) 60'
Substitutions:
HK	16	Gregor Hiddleston	(substituted on) 60'
PR	17	Rory Sutherland	(substituted on) 60'
PR	18	Zander Fagerson	(substituted on) 13'
LK	19	Alex Samuel	(substituted on) 60'
LK	20	Gregor Brown	(substituted on) 48'
SH	21	George Horne	(substituted on) 60'
FH	22	Fergus Burke	(substituted on) 4'	(substituted off) 18'	(substituted on) 66'
WG	23	Darcy Graham	(substituted on) 60'
Coach:
Gregor Townsend

Player of the Match:
Sione Tuipulotu (Scotland)

Assistant referees:
Paul Williams (New Zealand)
Jordan Way (Australia)
Television match official:
Brett Cronan (Australia)
Foul play review officer:
Eric Gauzins (France)

Notes:

- Gregor Hiddleston (Scotland) made his international debut.
- Matías Alemanno became the fifth Argentinean player to play 100 test caps.
- Scotland's 47 points was the most they had scored in Argentina, surpassing the 44 they scored against Argentina on their 2018 Autumn tour.

=== Round 2 ===
==== New Zealand v Italy ====
11 July 2026
17:10 NZST (UTC+12)

(1 BP) New Zealand	47–17	Italy
Try: Darry 7' c Jordan (3) 29' c, 50' c, 53' c Roigard 40+1' c de Groot 47' m Vaa'i 80' c Con: Love (6/7) 8', 30', 40+2', 51', 53', 80+1'	Report	Try: Menoncello 2' c Marin 56' c Con: Allan (1/1) 3'; P. Garbisi (1/1) 57'; Pen: Allan (1/1) 17'

Wellington Regional Stadium, Wellington
Attendance: 33,087
Referee: Luc Ramos (France)

New Zealand	Italy

FB	15	Damian McKenzie
RW	14	Will Jordan
OC	13	Billy Proctor
IC	12	Jordie Barrett	(substituted off) 57'
LW	11	Leroy Carter	(substituted off) 31'
FH	10	Ruben Love
SH	9	Cam Roigard	(substituted off) 57'
N8	8	Ardie Savea (c)	(substituted off) 65'
OF	7	Luke Jacobson	(substituted off) 40'
BF	6	Wallace Sititi
RL	5	Tupou Vaa'i
LL	4	Sam Darry
TP	3	Tyrel Lomax	(substituted off) 48'
HK	2	Codie Taylor	(substituted off) 48'
LP	1	Ethan de Groot	(substituted off) 49'
Substitutions:
HK	16	Samisoni Taukei'aho	(substituted on) 48'
PR	17	George Bower	(substituted on) 49'
PR	18	Pasilio Tosi	(substituted on) 48'
LK	19	Josh Lord	(substituted on) 65'
BR	20	Anton Segner	(substituted on) 40'
SH	21	Cortez Ratima	(substituted on) 57'
CE	22	Anton Lienert-Brown	(substituted on) 57'
WG	23	Josh Moorby	(substituted on) 31'
Coach:
Dave Rennie

FB	15	Tommaso Allan		(substituted off) 57'
RW	14	Malik Faissal		(substituted off) 40'
OC	13	Ignacio Brex
IC	12	Tommaso Menoncello
LW	11	Louis Lynagh
FH	10	Paolo Garbisi
SH	9	Stephen Varney
N8	8	Lorenzo Cannone	(red card) 51'
OF	7	Michele Lamaro (c)			(substituted off) 57'	(substituted on) 72'
BF	6	Ross Vintcent		(substituted off) 49'	(substituted on) 57'
RL	5	Andrea Zambonin		(substituted off) 63'
LL	4	Niccolò Cannone		(substituted off) 43'
TP	3	Marco Riccioni		(substituted off) 63'
HK	2	Tommaso Di Bartolomeo		(substituted off) 54'
LP	1	Danilo Fischetti		(substituted off) 54'
Substitutions:
HK	16	Gianmarco Lucchesi		(substituted on) 54'
PR	17	Mirco Spagnolo		(substituted on) 54'
PR	18	Muhamed Hasa		(substituted on) 63'
BR	19	Giulio Marini		(substituted on) 49'
LK	20	Federico Ruzza		(substituted on) 63'
LK	21	Riccardo Favretto		(substituted on) 43'
SH	22	Alessandro Garbisi		(substituted on) 57'
CE	23	Leonardo Marin		(substituted on) 40'
Coach:
Gonzalo Quesada

Player of the Match:
Will Jordan (New Zealand)

Assistant referees:
Nic Berry (Australia)
Luke Pearce (England)
Television match official:
Ben Whitehouse (Wales)
Foul play review officer:
Marius van der Westhuizen (South Africa)

Notes:

- Josh Moorby, Anton Segner (both New Zealand) and Giulio Marini (Italy) made their international debuts.
- Tyrel Lomax (New Zealand) earned this 50th test cap.
- Will Jordan scored his 50th test try, surpassing Doug Howlett's 49 tries to become the All Blacks' top try scorer.
- This was the most points Italy has scored against New Zealand in New Zealand, surpassing the 10 points scored in 2002.

==== Australia v France ====
11 July 2026
17:40 AEST (UTC+10)

(1 BP) Australia	26–42	France (1 BP)
Try: Paenga-Amosa 9' c McReight (2) 26' c, 33' c Williams 76' m Con: Lonergan (3/3) 10', 27', 34'	Report	Try: Meafou 2' c Grandidier-Nkanang (2) 17' m, 49' m Ntamack 52' c Verhaeghe 56' c Attissogbe 72' m Con: Lucu (3/5) 3', 53', 57'; Pen: Lucu (2/2) 45', 62'

Lang Park, Brisbane
Attendance: 52,121
Referee: Karl Dickson (England)

Australia (Note: Special "Indigenous jersey" worn only for this match)	France

FB	15	Tom Wright	(yellow card) 50'
RW	14	Max Jorgensen
OC	13	Joseph Sua'ali'i
IC	12	Len Ikitau		(substituted off) 72'
LW	11	Dylan Pietsch
FH	10	Declan Meredith		(substituted off) 58'
SH	9	Ryan Lonergan		(substituted off) 58'
N8	8	Harry Wilson (c)
OF	7	Fraser McReight
BF	6	Rob Valetini		(substituted off) 58'
RL	5	Josh Canham		(substituted off) 51'
LL	4	Jeremy Williams
TP	3	Allan Alaalatoa		(substituted off) 47'
HK	2	Josh Nasser		(substituted off) 3'
LP	1	Angus Bell		(substituted off) 51'
Substitutions:
HK	16	Brandon Paenga-Amosa		(substituted on) 3'
PR	17	James Slipper		(substituted on) 51'
PR	18	Taniela Tupou		(substituted on) 47'
LK	19	Lachlan Shaw		(substituted on) 51'
BR	20	Nick Champion de Crespigny		(substituted on) 58'
SH	21	Tate McDermott		(substituted on) 58'
FB	22	Jock Campbell		(substituted on) 58'
WG	23	Filipo Daugunu		(substituted on) 72'
Coach:
Joe Schmidt

FB	15	Matthieu Jalibert
RW	14	Théo Attissogbe
OC	13	Fabien Brau-Boirie
IC	12	Yoram Moefana		(substituted off) 69'
LW	11	Aaron Grandidier-Nkanang
FH	10	Romain Ntamack
SH	9	Maxime Lucu (c)		(substituted off) 62'
N8	8	Marko Gazzotti
OF	7	Oscar Jégou		(substituted off) 45'
BF	6	Lenni Nouchi
RL	5	Emmanuel Meafou	(yellow card) 24'	(substituted off) 52'
LL	4	Florian Verhaeghe		(substituted off) 72'
TP	3	Demba Bamba		(substituted off) 45'
HK	2	Peato Mauvaka		(substituted off) 45'
LP	1	Moses Alo-Emile		(substituted off) 45'
Substitutions:
HK	16	Maxime Lamothe		(substituted on) 45'
PR	17	Jefferson Poirot		(substituted on) 45'
PR	18	Tevita Tatafu		(substituted on) 45'
LK	19	Hugo Auradou		(substituted on) 72'
LK	20	Tom Staniforth		(substituted on) 52'
BR	21	Killian Tixeront		(substituted on) 45'
SH	22	Nolann Le Garrec		(substituted on) 62'
CE	23	Kalvin Gourgues		(substituted on) 69'
Coach:
Fabien Galthié

Player of the Match:
Romain Ntamack (France)

Assistant referees:
Christophe Ridley (England)
Katsuki Furuse (Japan)
Television match official:
Andrew Jackson (England)
Foul play review officer:
Glenn Newman (New Zealand)

Notes:

- Declan Meredith (Australia), Moses Alo-Emile and Aaron Grandidier-Nkanang (both France) made their international debuts.
- This was France's largest win against Australia in Australia (16 points), surpassing the previous nine-point margin set in 1990.
- This was the most points France has scored against Australia in Australia, surpassing the 31 points scored in 2005.
- France retained the Trophée des Bicentenaires for a record fourth consecutive time, and achieved their first win at Lang Park.

==== Japan v Ireland ====
11 July 2026
20:10 AEST (UTC+10)

Japan	20–36	Ireland (1 BP)
Try: Main 3' c Era 58' c Con: Matsunaga (2/2) 4', 59'; Pen: Matsunaga (2/2) 17', 27'	Report	Try: Timoney 8' c O'Toole 20' m Henshaw 34' c Jansen 50' c Stewart 79' c Con: Frawley (3/4) 9', 34', 50'; Byrne (1/1) 80'; Pen: Byrne (1/1) 71'

Newcastle International Sports Centre, Newcastle
Attendance: 11,021
Referee: Andrea Piardi (Italy)

Japan	Ireland

FB	15	Takurō Matsunaga
RW	14	Kazuma Ueda
OC	13	Dylan Riley		(substituted off) 40'
IC	12	Yuya Hirose		(substituted off) 31'
LW	11	Taira Main
FH	10	Ryūnosuke Itō
SH	9	Naoto Saitō		(substituted off) 72'
N8	8	Jack Cornelsen			(substituted off) 79'
OF	7	Kanji Shimokawa		(substituted off) 51'
BF	6	Ben Gunter
RL	5	Warner Dearns (c)
LL	4	Harry Hockings		(substituted off) 52'
TP	3	Shuhei Takeuchi		(substituted off) 53'
HK	2	Mamoru Harada		(substituted off) 47'	(substituted on) 79'
LP	1	Takato Okabe		(substituted off) 53'
Substitutions:
HK	16	Hayate Era	(yellow card) 77'	(substituted on) 47'
PR	17	Sojiro Otsuka		(substituted on) 53'
PR	18	Keijiro Tamefusa		(substituted on) 53'
LK	19	Michael Stolberg		(substituted on) 52'
BR	20	Michael Leitch		(substituted on) 51'
BR	21	Tiennan Costley		(substituted on) 31'
SH	22	Itsuki Kamimura		(substituted on) 72'
FH	23	Sam Greene		(substituted on) 40'
Coach:
Eddie Jones

FB	15	Jamie Osborne
RW	14	Jimmy O'Brien
OC	13	Robbie Henshaw
IC	12	Stuart McCloskey	(substituted off) 47'
LW	11	Jacob Stockdale	(substituted off) 59'
FH	10	Ciarán Frawley
SH	9	Craig Casey	(substituted off) 70'
N8	8	Sean Jansen	(substituted off) 61'
OF	7	Nick Timoney
BF	6	Jack Conan	(substituted off) 61'
RL	5	James Ryan
LL	4	Tadhg Beirne (c)
TP	3	Tom Clarkson	(substituted off) 47'
HK	2	Rónan Kelleher	(substituted off) 59'
LP	1	Tom O'Toole	(substituted off) 54'
Substitutions:
HK	16	Tom Stewart	(substituted on) 59'
PR	17	Billy Bohan	(substituted on) 54'
PR	18	Sam Illo	(substituted on) 47'
LK	19	Cormac Izuchukwu	(substituted on) 61'
BR	20	Bryn Ward	(substituted on) 61'
SH	21	Nathan Doak	(substituted on) 70'
FH	22	Harry Byrne	(substituted on) 59'
CE	23	Bundee Aki	(substituted on) 47'
Coach:
Andy Farrell

Player of the Match:
Sean Jansen (Ireland)

Assistant referees:
Ben O'Keeffe (New Zealand)
Morné Ferreira (South Africa)
Television match official:
Matteo Liperini (Italy)
Foul play review officer:
Ian Tempest (England)

Notes:

- Billy Bohan, Sean Jansen, Sam Illo and Bryn Ward (all Ireland) made their international debuts.
- Rónan Kelleher (Ireland) earned his 50th test cap.

==== Fiji v England ====
11 July 2026
14:10 BST (UTC+1)

Fiji	8–73	England (1 BP)
Try: Ikanivere 47' m Pen: Muntz (1/1) 12'	Report	Try: M. Smith 5' c George 14' c Pepper 27' c Janse van Rensburg 34' c Atkinson 37' c Feyi-Waboso 53' c Pollock (3) 54' m, 67' c, 79' c Slade 59' c Caluori 64' m Con: F. Smith (9/11) 5', 15', 28', 35', 38', 54', 60', 68', 80'

Hill Dickinson Stadium, Liverpool (England)
Attendance: 50,209
Referee: Hollie Davidson (Scotland)

Fiji	England

FB	15	Salesi Rayasi
RW	14	Vuate Karawalevu		(substituted off) 40'
OC	13	Kalaveti Ravouvou		(substituted off) 60'
IC	12	Josua Tuisova
LW	11	Jiuta Wainiqolo
FH	10	Caleb Muntz
SH	9	Simione Kuruvoli	(red card) 40+6'
N8	8	Levani Botia	(yellow card) 27'	(substituted off) 53'
OF	7	Lekima Tagitagivalu
BF	6	Peceli Yato		(substituted off) 58'
RL	5	Isoa Nasilasila
LL	4	Tevita Ratuva		(substituted off) 40'
TP	3	Mesake Doge		(substituted off) 54'
HK	2	Tevita Ikanivere (c)		(substituted off) 60'
LP	1	Eroni Mawi		(substituted off) 54'
Substitutions:
HK	16	Sam Matavesi		(substituted on) 60'
PR	17	Livai Natave		(substituted on) 54'
PR	18	Peni Ravai		(substituted on) 54'
LK	19	Temo Mayanavanua		(substituted on) 40'
BR	20	Elia Canakaivata		(substituted on) 53'
BR	21	Pita Gus Sowakula		(substituted on) 58'
SH	22	Frank Lomani		(substituted on) 40'
FH	23	Isaiah Armstrong-Ravula		(substituted on) 60'
Coach:
Senirusi Seruvakula

FB	15	Marcus Smith
RW	14	Tommy Freeman
OC	13	Henry Slade	(substituted off) 31'	(substituted on) 40'
IC	12	Seb Atkinson			(substituted off) 54'
LW	11	Immanuel Feyi-Waboso
FH	10	Fin Smith
SH	9	Jack van Poortvliet	(substituted off) 48'
N8	8	Ben Earl	(substituted off) 60'
OF	7	Guy Pepper
BF	6	Ollie Chessum
RL	5	George Martin	(substituted off) 48'
LL	4	Alex Coles
TP	3	Joe Heyes	(substituted off) 54'
HK	2	Jamie George (c)	(substituted off) 48'
LP	1	Ellis Genge	(substituted off) 48'
Substitutions:
HK	16	Luke Cowan-Dickie	(substituted on) 48'
PR	17	Asher Opoku-Fordjour	(substituted on) 48'
PR	18	George Kloska	(substituted on) 54'
BR	19	Tom Curry	(substituted on) 60'
BR	20	Henry Pollock	(substituted on) 48'
SH	21	Alex Mitchell	(substituted on) 48'	(substituted off) 57'
CE	22	Benhard Janse van Rensburg	(substituted on) 31'	(substituted off) 40'	(substituted on) 54'
WG	23	Noah Caluori		(substituted on) 57'
Coach:
Steve Borthwick

Player of the Match:
Fin Smith (England)

Assistant referees:
Eoghan Cross (Ireland)
Sam Grove-White (Scotland)
Television match official:
Mike Adamson (Scotland)
Foul play review officer:
Tual Trainini (France)

Notes:

- Noah Caluori, George Kloska, and Benhard Janse van Rensburg (all England) made their international debuts.
- The red card issued to Simione Kuruvoli was a permanent red card and could not be replaced after 20 minutes.
- This was England's largest win against Fiji by margin, and largest by score, surpassing their previous record (58–15) set in 2016.

==== South Africa v Scotland ====
11 July 2026
17:40 SAST (UTC+2)

(1 BP) South Africa	42–28	Scotland (1 BP)
Try: Papier 16' c Roos 18' c E. Louw 57' c Willemse 59' c Porthen 65' c Kriel 77' c Con: Pollard (5/5) 17', 19', 58', 60', 66'; Horn (1/1) 77'	Report	Try: M. Fagerson 33' c Rowe 39' c Bayliss 67' c White 69' c Con: Russell (4/4) 34', 40', 67', 70'

Loftus Versfeld Stadium, Pretoria
Attendance: 45,053
Referee: Pierre Brousset (France)

South Africa	Scotland

FB	15	Aphelele Fassi
RW	14	Edwill van der Merwe
OC	13	Jesse Kriel
IC	12	Damian Willemse
LW	11	Ethan Hooker			(substituted off) 45'
FH	10	Handré Pollard		(substituted off) 41'	(substituted on) 45'
SH	9	Embrose Papier		(substituted off) 41'
N8	8	Evan Roos		(substituted off) 41'
BF	7	Pieter-Steph du Toit (c)
OF	6	Paul de Villiers		(substituted off) 66'
RL	5	Ruan Nortjé
LL	4	Cobus Wiese		(substituted off) 31'
TP	3	Wilco Louw		(substituted off) 41'
HK	2	Johan Grobbelaar		(substituted off) 61'
LP	1	Boan Venter		(substituted off) 41'
Substitutions:
HK	16	Jan-Hendrik Wessels		(substituted on) 41'
PR	17	Ntuthuko Mchunu		(substituted on) 61'
PR	18	Zachary Porthen		(substituted on) 41'
BR	19	Vincent Tshituka		(substituted on) 66'
BR	20	Ben-Jason Dixon	(yellow card) 41'	(substituted on) 31'
BR	21	Elrigh Louw		(substituted on) 41'
SH	22	Grant Williams		(substituted on) 41'
WG	23	Quan Horn		(substituted on) 41'
Coach:
Rassie Erasmus

FB	15	Kyle Rowe
RW	14	Kyle Steyn
OC	13	Rory Hutchinson	(substituted off) 63'
IC	12	Sione Tuipulotu (c)
LW	11	Jamie Dobie	(substituted off) 67'
FH	10	Finn Russell
SH	9	Ben White
N8	8	Jack Dempsey
OF	7	Rory Darge	(substituted off) 40'
BF	6	Matt Fagerson	(substituted off) 58'
RL	5	Scott Cummings
LL	4	Gregor Brown	(substituted off) 63'
TP	3	Zander Fagerson	(substituted off) 58'
HK	2	Ewan Ashman	(substituted off) 58'
LP	1	Pierre Schoeman	(substituted off) 67'
Substitutions:
HK	16	Gregor Hiddleston	(substituted on) 58'
PR	17	Rory Sutherland	(substituted on) 67'
PR	18	Will Hurd	(substituted on) 58'
LK	19	Max Williamson	(substituted on) 63'
BR	20	Josh Bayliss	(substituted on) 40'
BR	21	Magnus Bradbury	(substituted on) 58'
FH	22	Tom Jordan	(substituted on) 67'
CE	23	Stafford McDowall	(substituted on) 63'
Coach:
Gregor Townsend

Player of the Match:
Handré Pollard (South Africa)

Assistant referees:
James Doleman (New Zealand)
Andrew Brace (Ireland)
Television match official:
Olly Hodges (Ireland)
Foul play review officer:
Richard Kelly (New Zealand)

Notes:

- Rory Sutherland (Scotland) earned his 50th test cap.
- This was Rassie Erasmus' 55th test match in charge of South Africa, a new record for a Springbok coach.

==== Argentina v Wales ====
11 July 2026
16:10 ART (UTC-03)

(1BP) Argentina	35–21	Wales
Try: Oviedo (2) 5' c, 47' c Piccardo 14' c Kremer 39' c S. Carreras 38' c Con: Albornoz (5/5) 6', 15', 35', 39', 48'	Report	Try: Lake 3' c Carré 23' c Warren 66' c Con: Costelow (3/3) 4', 23', 67'

Estadio San Juan del Bicentenario, San Juan
Attendance: 16,000
Referee: Paul Williams (New Zealand)

Argentina	Wales

FB	15	Santiago Carreras
RW	14	Bautista Delguy
OC	13	Lucio Cinti	(substituted off) 49'
IC	12	Justo Piccardo
LW	11	Mateo Carreras	(substituted off) 61'
FH	10	Tomás Albornoz
SH	9	Gonzalo García	(substituted off) 49'
N8	8	Joaquín Oviedo	(substituted off) 49'
OF	7	Marcos Kremer
BF	6	Santiago Grondona
RL	5	Matías Alemanno	(substituted off) 30'
LL	4	Guido Petti
TP	3	Tomas Rapetti	(substituted off) 49'
HK	2	Julián Montoya (c)	(substituted off) 35'	(substituted on) 40'
LP	1	Boris Wenger	(substituted off) 49'
Substitutions:
HK	16	Ignacio Ruiz	(substituted on) 35'	(substituted off) 40'	(substituted on) 61'
PR	17	Mayco Vivas	(substituted on) 49'
PR	18	Francisco Coria Marchetti	(substituted on) 49'
LK	19	Franco Molina	(substituted on) 30'		(substituted off) 61'
BR	20	Pablo Matera	(substituted on) 49'
SH	21	Simon Benitez Cruz	(substituted on) 49'
CE	22	Matías Moroni	(substituted on) 49'
WG	23	Ignacio Mendy	(substituted on) 61'
Coach:
Felipe Contepomi

FB	15	Blair Murray
RW	14	Ellis Mee	(substituted off) 49'
OC	13	Eddie James	(substituted off) 49'
IC	12	Joe Hawkins
LW	11	Josh Adams
FH	10	Sam Costelow
SH	9	Tomos Williams	(substituted off) 72'
N8	8	Aaron Wainwright	(substituted off) 66'
OF	7	Jac Morgan
BF	6	James Botham
RL	5	Adam Beard
LL	4	Ben Carter	(substituted off) 49'
TP	3	Dillon Lewis	(substituted off) 40'
HK	2	Dewi Lake (c)	(substituted off) 57'
LP	1	Rhys Carré	(substituted off) 40'
Substitutions:
HK	16	Ryan Elias	(substituted on) 57'
PR	17	Nicky Smith	(substituted on) 40'
PR	18	Ben Warren	(substituted on) 40'
LK	19	Teddy Williams	(substituted on) 49'
BR	20	Kane James	(substituted on) 66'
SH	21	Kieran Hardy	(substituted on) 72'
CE	22	Max Llewellyn	(substituted on) 49'
WG	23	Louis Rees-Zammit	(substituted on) 49'
Coach:
Steve Tandy

Player of the Match:
Joaquín Oviedo (Argentina)

Assistant referees:
Angus Gardner (Australia)
Nika Amashukeli (Georgia)
Television match official:
Eric Gauzins (France)
Foul play review officer:
Brett Cronan (Australia)

Notes:

- Guido Petti became the sixth Argentinean player to play 100 test caps.
- Kane James (Wales) made his international debut.
- Ryan Elias (Wales) earned this 50th test cap.
- With this result, this was the first time Argentina has won three consecutive times against Wales.

=== Round 3 ===
==== New Zealand v Ireland ====
18 July 2026
19:10 NZST (UTC+12)

(1 BP) New Zealand	40–21	Ireland
Try: Tuipulotu 15' c Savea 22' c Jordan 35' c Aumua 39' c McKenzie 56' c Lienert-Brown 79' m Con: Love (5/6) 15', 23', 36', 40', 57'	Report	Try: Conan 33' c J. McCarthy 45' c Keenan 63' c Con: Prendergast (3/3) 34', 45', 63'

Eden Park, Auckland
Attendance: 48,153
Referee: Nic Berry (Australia)

New Zealand	Ireland

FB	15	Damian McKenzie
RW	14	Will Jordan
OC	13	Quinn Tupaea		(substituted off) 68'
IC	12	Jordie Barrett
LW	11	Josh Moorby
FH	10	Ruben Love		(substituted off) 57'
SH	9	Cam Roigard		(substituted off) 73'
N8	8	Ardie Savea (c)
OF	7	Luke Jacobson	(yellow card) 28'	(substituted off) 73'
BF	6	Tupou Vaa'i
RL	5	Patrick Tuipulotu		(substituted off) 58'
LL	4	Josh Lord
TP	3	Tyrel Lomax		(substituted off) 5'	(substituted on) 16'	(substituted off) 58'
HK	2	Codie Taylor		(substituted off) 31'
LP	1	Ethan de Groot		(substituted off) 50'
Substitutions:
HK	16	Asafo Aumua		(substituted on) 31'
PR	17	Xavier Numia		(substituted on) 50'
PR	18	Fletcher Newell		(substituted on) 5'	(substituted off) 16'	(substituted on) 58'
BR	19	Anton Segner		(substituted on) 58'
BR	20	Peter Lakai		(substituted on) 73'
SH	21	Cortez Ratima		(substituted on) 73'
CE	22	Anton Lienert-Brown		(substituted on) 68'
WG	23	Caleb Clarke		(substituted on) 57'
Coach:
Dave Rennie

FB	15	Hugo Keenan
RW	14	Robert Baloucoune
OC	13	Garry Ringrose
IC	12	Stuart McCloskey				(substituted off) 60'	(substituted on) 75'
LW	11	Jimmy O'Brien	(substituted off) 13'		(substituted on) 22'	(substituted off) 58'
FH	10	Sam Prendergast
SH	9	Jamison Gibson-Park	(substituted off) 75'
N8	8	Jack Conan
OF	7	Josh van der Flier	(substituted off) 58'
BF	6	Tadhg Beirne
RL	5	James Ryan	(substituted off) 57'
LL	4	Joe McCarthy
TP	3	Tadhg Furlong	(substituted off) 60'
HK	2	Dan Sheehan (c)	(substituted off) 68'
LP	1	Tom O'Toole	(substituted off) 68'
Substitutions:
HK	16	Rónan Kelleher	(substituted on) 68'
PR	17	Jeremy Loughman	(substituted on) 68'
PR	18	Tom Clarkson	(substituted on) 60'
BR	19	Nick Timoney	(substituted on) 57'
BR	20	Sean Jansen	(substituted on) 58'
SH	21	Craig Casey	(substituted on) 75'
FH	22	Ciarán Frawley	(substituted on) 13'	(substituted off) 20'	(substituted on) 58'
CE	23	Bundee Aki		(substituted on) 20'	(substituted off) 22'	(substituted on) 60'	(substituted off) 75'
Coach:
Andy Farrell

Player of the Match:
Damian McKenzie (New Zealand)

Assistant referees:
Luc Ramos (France)
Damon Murphy (Australia)
Television match official:
Ben Whitehouse (Wales)
Foul play review officer:
Andrew Jackson (England)

==== Japan v France ====
18 July 2026
17:40 JST (UTC+9)

Japan	15–42	France (1 BP)
Try: Ishida 15' m Otsuka 36' c Con: Matsunaga (1/2) 36'; Pen: Matsunaga (1/1) 9'	Report	Try: Lamothe (2) 2' c, 51' c Jalibert (2) 19' c, 43' c Roumat 23' c Lucu 30' c Con: Lucu (5/5) 3', 20', 24', 31', 52'; Ntamack (1/1) 44'

Japan National Stadium, Tokyo
Attendance: 52,632
Referee: Ben O'Keeffe (New Zealand)

Japan	France

FB	15	Takurō Matsunaga
RW	14	Kazuma Ueda
OC	13	Dylan Riley
IC	12	Samisoni Tua
LW	11	Kippei Ishida		(substituted off) 53'
FH	10	Ryūnosuke Itō		(substituted off) 62'
SH	9	Naoto Saitō
N8	8	Jack Cornelsen		(substituted off) 62'
OF	7	Ben Gunter
BF	6	Esei Ha'angana		(substituted off) 49'
RL	5	Warner Dearns (c)
LL	4	Harry Hockings	(yellow card) 18'	(substituted off) 53'
TP	3	Keijiro Tamefusa		(substituted off) 57'
HK	2	Hayate Era		(substituted off) 62'
LP	1	Sojiro Otsuka		(substituted off) 49'
Substitutions:
PR	16	Kenji Sato		(substituted on) 62'
HK	17	Takato Okabe		(substituted on) 49'
PR	18	Izi Sword		(substituted on) 57'
LK	19	Michael Stolberg		(substituted on) 53'
BR	20	Michael Leitch		(substituted on) 49'
BR	21	Tiennan Costley		(substituted on) 62'
WG	22	Taira Main		(substituted on) 53'
FB	23	Shunsuke Uenobo		(substituted on) 62'
Coach:
Eddie Jones

FB	15	Matthieu Jalibert	(yellow card) 58'
RW	14	Théo Attissogbe
OC	13	Fabien Brau-Boirie
IC	12	Yoram Moefana		(substituted off) 56'
LW	11	Aaron Grandidier-Nkanang
FH	10	Romain Ntamack
SH	9	Maxime Lucu (c)		(substituted off) 68'
N8	8	Alexandre Roumat
OF	7	Marko Gazzotti	(yellow card) 77'
BF	6	Lenni Nouchi		(substituted off) 7'	(substituted on) 18'	(substituted off) 63'
RL	5	Emmanuel Meafou		(substituted off) 56'
LL	4	Florian Verhaeghe		(substituted off) 7'	(substituted on) 18'	(substituted off) 40'
TP	3	Régis Montagne		(substituted off) 56'
HK	2	Maxime Lamothe		(substituted off) 56'
LP	1	Jefferson Poirot		(substituted off) 56'
Substitutions:
HK	16	Peato Mauvaka		(substituted on) 56'
PR	17	Reda Wardi		(substituted on) 56'
PR	18	Sipili Falatea		(substituted on) 56'
LK	19	Hugo Auradou		(substituted on) 7'	(substituted off) 18'	(substituted on) 40'
LK	20	Tom Staniforth		(substituted on) 56'
BR	21	Killian Tixeront		(substituted on) 7'	(substituted off) 18'	(substituted on) 63'
SH	22	Paul Graou		(substituted on) 68'
CE	23	Kalvin Gourgues		(substituted on) 56'
Coach:
Fabien Galthié

Player of the Match:
Matthieu Jalibert (France)

Assistant referees:
Andrea Piardi (Italy)
Luke Pearce (England)
Television match official:
Glenn Newman (New Zealand)
Foul play review officer:
Matteo Liperini (Italy)

Notes:

- Esei Ha'angana, Izi Sword, Shunsuke Uenobo (all Japan) and Paul Graou (France) made their international debuts.

==== Australia v Italy ====
18 July 2026
18:10 AWST (UTC+8)

(1 BP) Australia	57–10	Italy
Try: Canham (3) 4' m, 27' m, 52' c Wright 9' c Paenga-Amosa 12' c Bell 31' c Ikitau 40+1' c Pollard 64' m Donaldson 80' c Con: Lonergan (5/7) 10', 13', 32', 40+1', 53'; Donaldson (1/2) 80+1'	Report	Try: Lamaro 20' m Ioane 41' m

Perth Rectangular Stadium, Perth
Attendance: 19,268
Referee: Christophe Ridley (England)

Australia	Italy

FB	15	Tom Wright
RW	14	Max Jorgensen
OC	13	Joseph Sua'ali'i
IC	12	Len Ikitau	(substituted off) 67'
LW	11	Harry Potter
FH	10	Declan Meredith	(substituted off) 65'
SH	9	Ryan Lonergan	(substituted off) 59'
N8	8	Harry Wilson (c)
OF	7	Carlo Tizzano	(substituted off) 63'
BF	6	Rob Valetini
RL	5	Jeremy Williams	(substituted off) 58'
LL	4	Josh Canham
TP	3	Allan Alaalatoa	(substituted off) 53'
HK	2	Brandon Paenga-Amosa	(substituted off) 58'
LP	1	Angus Bell	(substituted off) 53'	(substituted on) 71'
Substitutions:
HK	16	Billy Pollard	(substituted on) 58'
PR	17	James Slipper	(substituted on) 53'	(substituted off) 71'
PR	18	Zane Nonggorr	(substituted on) 53'
LK	19	Miles Amatosero	(substituted on) 58'
BR	20	Fraser McReight	(substituted on) 63'
SH	21	Tate McDermott	(substituted on) 59'
FH	22	Ben Donaldson	(substituted on) 65'
WG	23	Filipo Daugunu	(substituted on) 67'
Coach:
Joe Schmidt

FB	15	Lorenzo Pani		(substituted off) 65'
RW	14	Louis Lynagh
OC	13	Ignacio Brex
IC	12	Paolo Odogwu
LW	11	Monty Ioane
FH	10	Paolo Garbisi		(substituted off) 53'
SH	9	Alessandro Garbisi		(substituted off) 53'	(substituted on) 65'	(substituted off) 73'
N8	8	Ross Vintcent
OF	7	Michele Lamaro (c)		(substituted off) 46'	(substituted on) 58'
BF	6	Riccardo Favretto
RL	5	Federico Ruzza		(substituted off) 58'
LL	4	Giulio Marini
TP	3	Marco Riccioni	(red card) 66'	(substituted off) 55'
HK	2	Gianmarco Lucchesi		(substituted off) 53'
LP	1	Muhamed Hasa		(substituted off) 46'
Substitutions:
HK	16	Pablo Dimcheff		(substituted on) 53'
PR	17	Danilo Fischetti		(substituted on) 46'
PR	18	Ion Neculai		(substituted on) 55'
LK	19	Andrea Zambonin		(substituted on) 58'
LK	20	Alessandro Ortombina		(substituted on) 46'	(substituted off) 58'
SH	21	Alessandro Fusco		(substituted on) 53'	(substituted off) 65'	(substituted on) 73'
FH	22	Giacomo Da Re		(substituted on) 53'
CE	23	Leonardo Marin		(substituted on) 65'
Coach:
German Fernandez (Note: Head Coach Gonzalo Quesada received a one-match ban for this game and was replaced by Fernandez for the game as acting head coach.)

Player of the Match:
Josh Canham (Australia)

Assistant referees:
Karl Dickson (England)
Morné Ferreira (South Africa)
Television match official:
Marius van der Westhuizen (South Africa)
Foul play review officer:
Ian Tempest (England)

Notes:

- The attendance of 19,268 was a record attendance for an Australian test match at the venue.

==== Fiji v Scotland ====
18 July 2026
14:10 BST (UTC+1)

Fiji	17–33	Scotland (1 BP)
Try: Ikanivere 16' m Ravutaumada 19' m Canakaivata 34' m Con: Armstrong-Ravula (1/3) 35'	Report	Try: Gray 14' c Schoeman 54' c Dobie (2) 61' c, 76' m Cummings 74' m Con: Horne (1/1) 14'; Burke (3/4) 55', 61', 74'

Murrayfield Stadium, Edinburgh (Scotland)
Attendance: 55,215
Referee: Matthew Carley (England)

Fiji	Scotland

FB	15	Isaiah Armstrong-Ravula		(substituted off) 74'
RW	14	Selestino Ravutaumada
OC	13	Virimi Vakatawa		(substituted off) 69'
IC	12	Josua Tuisova
LW	11	Jiuta Wainiqolo
FH	10	Caleb Muntz
SH	9	Frank Lomani		(substituted off) 74'
N8	8	Elia Canakaivata
OF	7	Lekima Tagitagivalu	(yellow card) 25'	(substituted off) 50'	(substituted on) 61'
BF	6	Pita Gus Sowakula			(substituted off) 61'
RL	5	Temo Mayanavanua		(substituted off) 61'
LL	4	Isoa Nasilasila
TP	3	Mesake Doge		(substituted off) 48'
HK	2	Tevita Ikanivere (c)		(substituted off) 74'
LP	1	Eroni Mawi		(substituted off) 48'
Substitutions:
HK	16	Sam Matavesi		(substituted on) 74'
PR	17	Livai Natave		(substituted on) 48'
PR	18	Peni Ravai		(substituted on) 48'
LK	19	Mesake Vocevoce		(substituted on) 61'
BR	20	Kitione Salawa Jr.		(substituted on) 50'
SH	21	Sam Wye		(substituted on) 74'
FH	22	Isikeli Rabitu		(substituted on) 69'
FB	23	Salesi Rayasi		(substituted on) 74'
Coach:
Senirusi Seruvakula

FB	15	Tom Jordan
RW	14	Darcy Graham	(substituted off) 55'
OC	13	Ollie Smith
IC	12	Stafford McDowall (c)
LW	11	Duhan van der Merwe
FH	10	Fergus Burke
SH	9	George Horne	(substituted off) 48'	(substituted on) 61'	(substituted off) 71'
N8	8	Gregor Brown	(substituted off) 58'
OF	7	Freddy Douglas
BF	6	Josh Bayliss
RL	5	Max Williamson	(substituted off) 48'
LL	4	Jonny Gray	(substituted off) 50'
TP	3	D'Arcy Rae	(substituted off) 48'
HK	2	Gregor Hiddleston	(substituted off) 66'
LP	1	Rory Sutherland	(substituted off) 48'
Substitutions:
HK	16	Seb Stephen	(substituted on) 66'
PR	17	Pierre Schoeman	(substituted on) 48'
PR	18	Zander Fagerson	(substituted on) 48'
LK	19	Scott Cummings	(substituted on) 50'
BR	20	Liam McConnell	(substituted on) 58'
BR	21	Magnus Bradbury	(substituted on) 48'
SH	22	Jamie Dobie	(substituted on) 48'	(substituted off) 61'	(substituted on) 71'
CE	23	Sione Tuipulotu	(substituted on) 55'
Coach:
Gregor Townsend

Player of the Match:
Stafford McDowall (Scotland)

Assistant referees:
Eoghan Cross (Ireland)
Anthony Woodthorpe (England)
Television match official:
Tual Trainini (France)
Foul play review officer:
Leo Colgan (Ireland)

Notes:

- Virimi Vakatawa (Fiji) and Seb Stephen (Scotland) made their international debuts.

==== South Africa v Wales ====
18 July 2026
17:40 SAST (UTC+2)

(1 BP) South Africa	43–0	Wales
Try: J. Wiese 5' c Reinach 14' c Kriel 40+1' m Williams 41' c Jantjies 63' m Arendse 69' m de Villiers 80' c Con: Moyo (3/4) 6', 15', 42'; Libbok (1/3) 80'	Report

Kings Park Stadium, Durban
Attendance: 40,299
Referee: Andrew Brace (Ireland)

South Africa	Wales

FB	15	Aphelele Fassi	(substituted off) 60'
RW	14	Jaco Williams
OC	13	Jesse Kriel
IC	12	Damian de Allende
LW	11	Kurt-Lee Arendse
FH	10	Vusi Moyo	(substituted off) 48'
SH	9	Cobus Reinach	(substituted off) 52'
N8	8	Jasper Wiese	(substituted off) 54'
BF	7	Pieter-Steph du Toit (c)
OF	6	Paul de Villiers
RL	5	Ruben van Heerden
LL	4	Cobus Wiese	(substituted off) 48'
TP	3	Carlü Sadie	(substituted off) 48'
HK	2	Malcolm Marx	(substituted off) 48'
LP	1	Gerhard Steenekamp	(substituted off) 48'
Substitutions:
HK	16	Andre-Hugo Venter	(substituted on) 48'
HK	17	Jan-Hendrik Wessels	(substituted on) 48'
PR	18	Wilco Louw	(substituted on) 48'
BR	19	Ben-Jason Dixon	(substituted on) 48'
BR	20	Marco van Staden	(substituted on) 54'
SH	21	Herschel Jantjies	(substituted on) 52'
FH	22	Manie Libbok	(substituted on) 48'
FB	23	Damian Willemse	(substituted on) 60'
Coach:
Rassie Erasmus

FB	15	Blair Murray
RW	14	Louis Rees-Zammit
OC	13	Max Llewellyn		(substituted off) 40'
IC	12	Ben Thomas			(substituted off) 66'	(substituted on) 76'
LW	11	Ellis Mee
FH	10	Dan Edwards
SH	9	Tomos Williams		(substituted off) 74'
N8	8	Aaron Wainwright		(substituted off) 44'
OF	7	Jac Morgan
BF	6	Alex Mann		(substituted off) 65'
RL	5	Adam Beard
LL	4	Teddy Williams		(substituted off) 54'
TP	3	Dillon Lewis		(substituted off) 54'	(substituted on) 66'	(substituted off) 76'
HK	2	Dewi Lake (c)		(substituted off) 40'
LP	1	Rhys Carré		(substituted off) 40'
Substitutions:
HK	16	Ryan Elias		(substituted on) 40'
PR	17	Nicky Smith		(substituted on) 40'
PR	18	Ben Warren	(yellow card) 63'	(substituted on) 54'
LK	19	Freddie Thomas		(substituted on) 54'
BR	20	Tommy Reffell		(substituted on) 65'
BR	21	James Botham		(substituted on) 44'
SH	22	Reuben Morgan-Williams		(substituted on) 74'
CE	23	Joe Hawkins		(substituted on) 40'
Coach:
Steve Tandy

Player of the Match:
Paul de Villiers (South Africa)

Assistant referees:
Pierre Brousset (France)
James Doleman (New Zealand)
Television match official:
Olly Hodges (Ireland)
Foul play review officer:
Richard Kelly (New Zealand)

Notes:

- Vusi Moyo, Carlü Sadie, Ruben van Heerden and Jaco Williams (all South Africa) made their international debuts.

==== Argentina v England ====
18 July 2026
16:10 ART (UTC-03)

(1 BP) Argentina	24–31	England (1 BP)
Try: M. Carreras 43' c Penalty try 56'; Piccardo 80' c Con: Albornoz (2/2) 44', 80'; Pen: Albornoz (1/1) 30'	Report	Try: Freeman 4' m Earl (2) 24' c, 33' c M. Smith 62'; Feyi-Waboso 69' m Con: F. Smith (3/5) 24', 33', 62'

Estadio Único Madre de Ciudades, Santiago del Estero
Attendance: 22,225
Referee: Angus Gardner (Australia)

Argentina (Note: This kit was an exact replica of the model worn by the Argentina football team during the historic "goal of the century" match in 1986, including details like the silver numbers on back. The kit –manufactured by Pumas kit supplier Le Coq Sportif, the same than Argentina in 1986– was a limited edition to commemorate the 40th. anniversary of the historic football match.)	England

FB	15	Santiago Carreras	(yellow card) 62'
RW	14	Bautista Delguy
OC	13	Matías Moroni
IC	12	Justo Piccardo
LW	11	Mateo Carreras	(yellow card) 24'	(substituted off) 51'
FH	10	Tomás Albornoz
SH	9	Gonzalo García		(substituted off) 60'
N8	8	Joaquín Oviedo	(yellow card) 60'
OF	7	Marcos Kremer		(substituted off) 60'
BF	6	Santiago Grondona		(substituted off) 46'
RL	5	Matías Alemanno		(substituted off) 46'
LL	4	Guido Petti
TP	3	Tomas Rapetti		(substituted off) 46'
HK	2	Julián Montoya (c)		(substituted off) 60'
LP	1	Mayco Vivas		(substituted off) 46'
Substitutions:
HK	16	Ignacio Ruiz		(substituted on) 60'
PR	17	Boris Wenger		(substituted on) 46'
PR	18	Pedro Delgado		(substituted on) 46'
LK	19	Efraín Elías		(substituted on) 46'
BR	20	Pablo Matera		(substituted on) 46'
BR	21	Joaquín Moro		(substituted on) 60'
SH	22	Simon Benitez Cruz		(substituted on) 60'
CE	23	Lucio Cinti		(substituted on) 51'
Coach:
Felipe Contepomi

FB	15	Marcus Smith			(substituted off) 77'
RW	14	Tommy Freeman
OC	13	Henry Slade
IC	12	Seb Atkinson				(substituted off) 74'	(substituted on) 79'
LW	11	Immanuel Feyi-Waboso		(substituted off) 79'
FH	10	Fin Smith		(substituted off) 45'	(substituted on) 56'
SH	9	Jack van Poortvliet	(yellow card) 51'	(substituted off) 70'
N8	8	Ben Earl		(substituted off) 55'
OF	7	Guy Pepper
BF	6	Ollie Chessum
RL	5	George Martin		(substituted off) 67'
LL	4	Alex Coles	(yellow card) 55'
TP	3	Joe Heyes		(substituted off) 66'
HK	2	Jamie George (c)		(substituted off) 49'
LP	1	Ellis Genge		(substituted off) 49'	(substituted on) 77'
Substitutions:
HK	16	Luke Cowan-Dickie		(substituted on) 49'
PR	17	Emmanuel Iyogun	(yellow card) 76'	(substituted on) 49'
PR	18	George Kloska		(substituted on) 66'
BR	19	Tom Curry		(substituted on) 67'
BR	20	Henry Pollock	(yellow card) 73'	(substituted on) 55'
SH	21	Ben Spencer		(substituted on) 70'
CE	22	Benhard Janse van Rensburg		(substituted on) 45'	(substituted off) 56'	(substituted on) 74'	(substituted off) 79'
WG	23	Noah Caluori		(substituted on) 79'
Coach:
Steve Borthwick

Player of the Match:
Immanuel Feyi-Waboso (England)

Assistant referees:
Nika Amashukeli (Georgia)
Paul Williams (New Zealand)
Television match official:
Eric Gauzins (France)
Foul play review officer:
Brett Cronan (Australia)

Notes:

- Emmanuel Iyogun (England) made his international debut.
- The seven yellow cards given throughout the match by referee Angus Gardner was a test record.

== See also ==
- 2026 World Rugby Nations Cup
- 2026 World Rugby Nations Cup Americas-Pacific Series
- 2026 men's rugby union internationals
