= Ireland v. Australia =

Ireland v. Australia may refer to:

- International Rules Series
- History of rugby union matches between Australia and Ireland
