= Josh Canham =

Australian rugby union player (born 2001)

- Full name: Joshua Canham
- Born: 1 February 2001 (age 25) Peoria, Illinois, United States
- Height: 202 cm (6 ft 8 in)
- Weight: 119 kg (262 lb; 18 st 10 lb)
- School: Brighton Grammar School
- Notable relative: Ben Canham (brother)

Rugby union career
- Position: Lock
- Current team: Reds
Youth career
- –2020: Harlequin Rugby Club
- –2020: Brighton Grammar School
- 2019–2020: Rebels Academy
Amateur team(s)
Years	Team	Apps	(Points)
2020–2021	Eastwood	2	(0)
2021	Bond University	3	(0)
Senior career
Years	Team	Apps	(Points)
2021–2024	Rebels	34	(10)
2025–	Reds	20	(10)
- Correct as of 15 June 2026
International career
Years	Team	Apps	(Points)
2024	Australia A	1	(0)
2024–	Australia	9	(20)
- Correct as of 17 October 2026

Josh Canham (born 1 February 2001) is an Australian rugby union player who plays for the Reds in Super Rugby. His playing position is lock in the forward-line. He was named in the Rebels wider training squad for the 2022 Super Rugby Pacific season. He made his Rebels debut in Round 3 of the 2022 Super Rugby Pacific season against the Drua. Canham has been labelled the "biggest success story of the Victorian Rugby system", having played all his junior rugby in the state of Victoria before making his professional debut for the Victorian-based Melbourne Rebels.

== Background and early career ==
Canham was born in Peoria, Arizona, United States, to English parents. Canham's father, who also played rugby union in the 1980s, worked for the construction company Caterpillar. Because of his father's work, the Canham family moved to Switzerland and Singapore while Josh was still in his youth, before finally settling in Melbourne when he was 8-years-old.

Growing up, Canham was active in basketball alongside rugby, playing as power forward and center due to his size. He was lured to play Australian rules football, living in the epicenter of the sport, however his distaste of his school's coaches at Brighton Grammar School, and his connection to rugby from his father led him to turn it down.

His junior rugby career began with the Harlequin Rugby Club in Melbourne's eastern suburbs. Canham was educated at Brighton Grammar School, and was in the school's First XV for 2018 and was the schools First XV vice-captain in 2019.

Josh is the brother of Australian Olympic rower Ben Canham.

== Career ==
In mid-2020, Canham moved to Sydney to play for Eastwood in Sydney's Shute Shield club competition. After arriving on 18 July 2020, Canham underwent two weeks of self-isolation due to the COVID-19 pandemic before he began training. In 2020 Canham had played for Eastwood's lower grades, before getting promoted to the senior team for 2021, with head coach Ben Batger stating in an interview, "I've got a few really good, young locks I'm quite excited about that played lower grades last year. Charlie Cale, Jack Lafolafo and Josh Canham are all 198 centimetres – so they'll be playing Super Rugby next year as there's no locks anywhere! But it's good to have some height coming through." Canham was called up in March to the first of two Australia U20 (Junior Wallabies) training camps for 2021, which took place on the Gold Coast, Queensland in preparation for the 2021 Oceania Rugby U20 Championship. Canham eventually made two appearances for Eastwood in the shortened Shute Shield season and was called-up to the second Australia U20 camp in May. In June 2021, Canham was named in the Australia U20 squad ahead of the 2021 Oceania Rugby U20 Championship. The team was based in the Gold Coast, Queensland until the start of the tournament in July, however the 2021 Oceania Rugby U20 Championship was subsequently cancelled due to impacts of the COVID-19 pandemic. Instead of returning to Sydney, where lockdown restrictions were in place, Canham chose to remain on the Gold Coast, receiving a release from Eastwood to join the local side: Bond University. Canham began playing for Bond University in July 2021, and made a total of three appearances for the club in Queensland's Hospital Cup competition.

=== Rebels ===
In February 2022 Canham was named in the Melbourne Rebels' wider training squad ahead of the 2022 Super Rugby Pacific season, having come through as an Academy product. He played ten games for the Rebels in his breakout season, starting in six games and scoring a try in Round 12 against the Blues in a 71–28 defeat. Originally being deployed as a loosehead lock, Canham made one substitution in the back row in 2022. In 2023, Canham transitioned once again, to the tighthead lock position, where he started in nine of his ten appearances for the Rebels.

Following consistent performances across the 2022 and 2023 seasons, Canham featured in fifteen matches for the Rebels in 2024, including a quarter-final knockout against the Hurricanes, before receiving a call-up to the Wallabies squad. In June 2024, The Sydney Morning Herald described Canham as 'terrific' and noted that his lineout work had reached the 'next level'. This was, however, the final season for the Rebels. They were cut from the Super Rugby competition at the conclusion of the 2024 campaign.

In his final year at the Rebels, Canham, who has a British passport, was offered deals from the Northampton Saints in the English Premiership and Japan.

=== Reds ===
At the conclusion of the 2024 season, Canham was announced by the Queensland Reds as a new signing. Canham signed a two-year deal with the Reds, and was joined by five former Rebels teammates as the team had been axed from the competition.

Canham started his first match for the Reds in 2025 in their second round win at home against the Moana Pasifika. Canham, in the second row alongside Ryan Smith, played 54 minutes before being replaced by Angus Blyth. The Reds scored eight tries in a 20-point win. For the vast majority of the season, Canham played alongside Smith in the second row, although by round eight had regular minutes with Australian Test lock Lukhan Salakaia-Loto. Toward the latter end of the 2025 season, Canham was touted as "arguably... the most consistent [Lock] in 2025", which was "boding well for his Wallabies hopes." His athleticism was also cited as a major strength of his, with his "cleaning at the ruck" and work rate also being impressive. Canham made 14 appearances for the Reds in the 2025 Super Rugby season, scoring one try, as they were knocked out in the qualifying finals to the Crusaders.

In late June 2025, Canham was named as the Reds' starting blindside lock next to Lukhan Salakaia-Loto at openside lock in their tour match against the British & Irish Lions. Canham was one of eleven Test players in the Reds matchday squad. Despite losing by forty points, Canham impressed in the match, making eleven tackles.

In 2026, Canham played in the Reds' opening three matches. He suffered an unspecified injury late in their fourth round match against the ACT Brumbies, which was later revealed to be a hamstring injury. Canham did not return to the Reds' matchday squad until round fifteen against the Moana Pasifika, where he scored his first try of the season. The Reds made the finals for the fifth straight season, however were knocked out in the qualifying finals to the Chiefs in Hamilton.

== International career ==
Being born in the United States to English parents, Canham is eligible to represent the United States, Australia or England at international level.

Canham began his international career in 2021 after being called-up to the Junior Wallabies camps for the 2021 Oceania Rugby U20 Championship. Canham was not called-up at international level again until August 2024 for Australia's two-test tour of Argentina in the 2024 Rugby Championship. Canham made his international debut for Australia on 7 September 2024, coming on as a substitute in the 66th minute for Nick Frost. Australia lost 67–27 in Santa Fe. Two months later, in November 2024, Canham represented Australia A on their Spring tour. Canham started at tighthead lock, however Australia A lost 17–38 against the England Saxons in Twickenham Stoop, London.

In mid-2025, Canham made another appearance for the Australia A team against Japan XV. In the match, which Australia A won with a score of 71–7 in Osaka, Japan, Canham stole five Japanese lineout balls, and scored a try assist late in the match. He was recalled into the Australia senior squad following the match for their 2025 Spring Tour. After making his second Test cap for Australia, Canham suffered a concussion in the first twenty minutes of Australia's match against Japan in Tokyo and did not return.

On 4 July 2026, Canham scored his first try for Australia in a 31–33 loss to Ireland in the 2026 Nations Championship. Two weeks later, on 18 July, Canham became the first Wallabies lock to score a Test hat-trick of tries in Australia's match against Italy. Australia won 57–10. In the first Test against Japan in the 2026 Australia–Japan Test Series, the Wallabies won by three points in Osaka despite poor kicking, tackling and various other mistakes. Canham however was a standout player, starting at lock in his fourth straight successive start for the team, winning five lineouts, including one crucial steal.

== Career statistics ==
=== Club ===
As of 30 July 2026.

Statistics by club, season and competition
Club	Season	League			
Club	Season	Division	Apps	Tries	Points
Rebels	2022	Super Rugby Pacific	10	1	5
Rebels	2023	Super Rugby Pacific	10	0	0
Rebels	2024	Super Rugby Pacific	14	1	5
Rebels	Total		34	2	10
Reds	2025	Super Rugby Pacific	16 (Note: Two matches were played in the Reds' post-season tour matches: one against the British & Irish Lions on their 2025 tour series, and one against Tonga.)	2	10
Reds	2026	Super Rugby Pacific	6	1	5
Reds	Total		22	3	15
Career total			56	5	25

=== International ===
As of 17 October 2026.

Statistics by team and year
Team	Year	Statistic		
Team	Year	Apps	Tries	Points
Australia A	2024	1	0	0
Australia A	2025	1	0	0
Total		2	0	0
Australia	2024	1	0	0
Australia	2025	1	0	0
Australia	2026	7	4	20
Total		9	4	20

=== International tries ===
List of international tries scored by Josh Canham
No.	Opponent	Location	Competition	Date	Result	Ref.
1	Ireland	Sydney Football Stadium, Sydney	2026 Nations Championship	4 July 2026	31–33	
2	Italy	Perth Rectangular Stadium, Perth	2026 Nations Championship	18 July 2026	57–10	
3	Italy	Perth Rectangular Stadium, Perth	2026 Nations Championship	18 July 2026	57–10	
4	Italy	Perth Rectangular Stadium, Perth	2026 Nations Championship	18 July 2026	57–10	
