= Barnabé Massa =

French rugby union player (born 2004)

- Born: 13 May 2004 (age 22) Valence, Drôme, France
- Height: 180 cm (5 ft 11 in)
- Weight: 103 kg (227 lb; 16 st 3 lb)

Rugby union career
- Position: Hooker
- Current team: Clermont
Senior career
Years	Team	Apps	(Points)
2023–2024	Grenoble	34	(50)
2024–	Clermont	48	(75)
- Correct as of 23 August 2026
International career
Years	Team	Apps	(Points)
2023–2024	France U20	9	(10)
2026	France XV	1	(0)
2026–	France	1	(0)
- Correct as of 23 August 2026

Barnabé Massa (born 13 May 2004) is a French rugby union player, who plays for Clermont. His preferred position is hooker.

== Early career ==
Massa was born in Valence, Drôme and began playing rugby at US Véore, before joining the academy of Valence Romans and later moving to Grenoble. Originally a number 8, he converted to hooker while with Grenoble. In April 2022, Massa was selected for the France U18 squad, before representing the France U20 side in both 2023 and 2024.

== Professional career ==
Massa debuted for Grenoble in February 2023 in the fixture against Béziers. He would make a further three appearances that season, scoring one try. The following season, he would make 30 appearances, scoring nine tries after becoming first choice hooker, breaking a tackle record in a fixture against Vannes. Grenoble would make the Top 14 promotion/relegation match having finished second in the Pro D2, losing to Montpellier. He joined Clermont ahead of the 2024/26 season.

Massa represented France XV in the fixture against England XV in June 2026. Four days later he was included in the full France squad for the 2026 Nations Championship Southern Hemisphere Series. He would debut as a replacement in France's first game of the tour against New Zealand.
