= Paul Alo-Emile =

Samoa international rugby union player

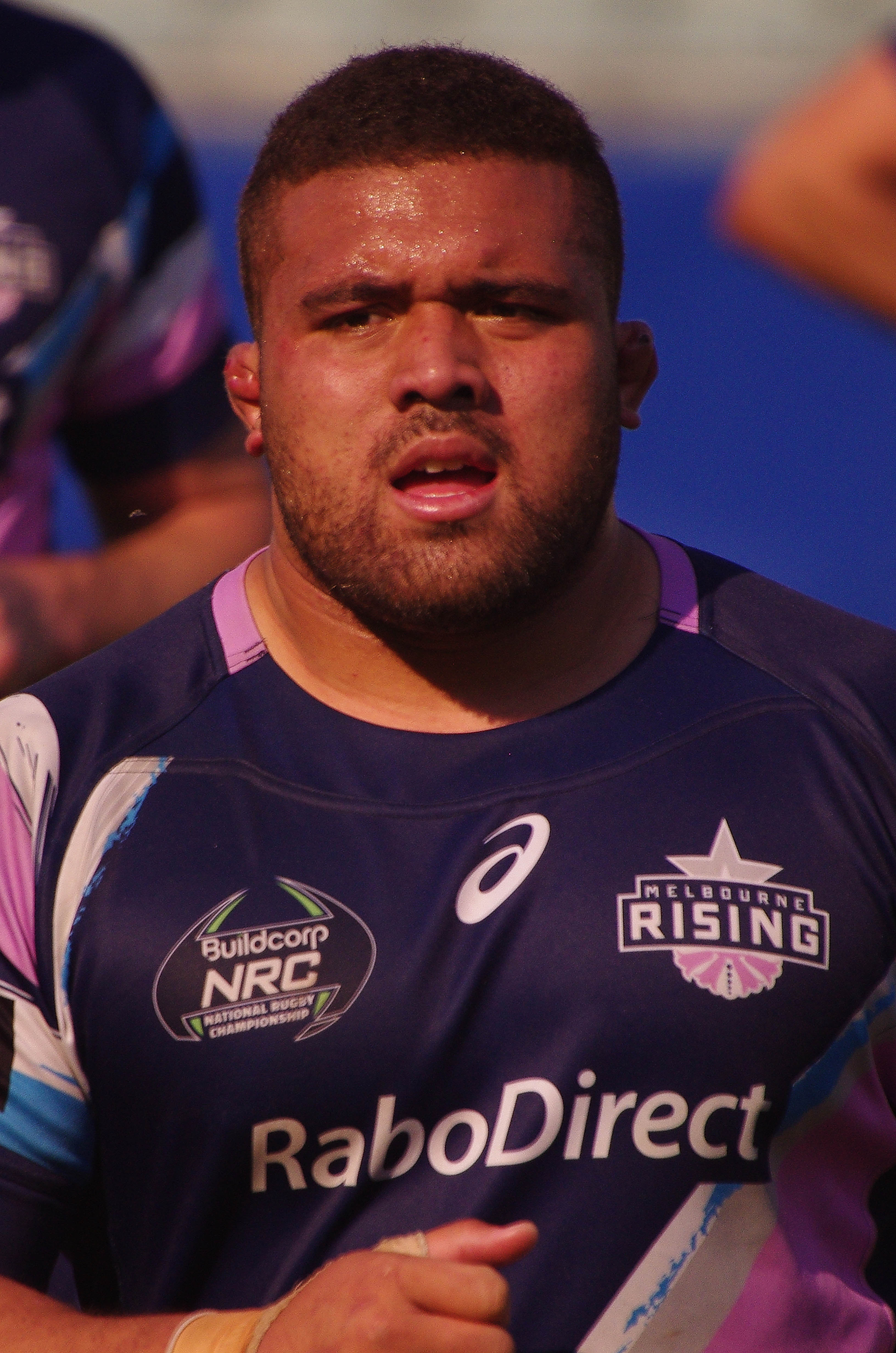
- Alo-Emile representing Melbourne Rising during the National Rugby Championship
- Born: 22 December 1991 (age 34) Auckland, New Zealand
- Height: 1.80 m (5 ft 11 in)
- Weight: 136 kg (300 lb; 21 st 6 lb)
- School: Brisbane State High School
- Notable relative: Moses Alo-Emile (brother)

Rugby union career
- Position: Prop
- Current team: Stade Français
Senior career
Years	Team	Apps	(Points)
2012–2015	Melbourne Rebels	50	(5)
2013	Waikato	9	(0)
2014	Melbourne Rising	9	(5)
2015–	Stade Français	210	(35)
- Correct as of 28 August 2023
International career
Years	Team	Apps	(Points)
2010–2011	Australia U20	9	(0)
2017–	Samoa	22	(0)
- Correct as of 28 August 2023

Paul Alo-Emile (born 22 December 1991) is a professional rugby union player who plays as a prop for Top 14 club Stade Français. Born in New Zealand, he represents Samoa at international level after qualifying on ancestry grounds.

== Early life ==
Alo-Emile is of Samoan heritage, born in Auckland before moving to Brisbane at the age of four. He is the second child of eight siblings, with four sisters and three brothers. He attended Brisbane State High School, joining the Australian Rugby Union's National Talent Squad in 2006, representing the Australian Schoolboys. In 2009 was a member of the Queensland side that won the Australian Schools Rugby title. Alo-Emile also represented the state of Queensland in Gridiron (American football).

He played for Sunnybank in the Queensland Premier Rugby competition.

In 2010, Alo-Emile joined the Australian under 20s. At the 2011 IRB Junior World Championship, he played against England, France, New Zealand, Scotland, South Africa, and Tonga.

== Club career ==
=== Super Rugby and ITM Cup ===
Alo-Emile was a member of the Western Force in 2011, but did not make any first-team appearances. He joined the Melbourne Rebels in 2012. At the end of the 2013 Super Rugby season, he had 19 Super Rugby caps, and the Rebels released him to Waikato for the 2013 ITM Cup season.

=== Top 14 ===
In November 2014, Alo-Emile and Stade Français Paris announced that he would join the Parisian team at the end of the Super Rugby season. Largely second choice behind Rabah Slimani in his first years in Paris, Alo-Emile renewed his contract in March 2018 having become first choice following Slimani's departure for Clermont. Ahead of the 2020-21 Top 14 season, Alo-Emile was announced as the new captain of Stade Français Paris. In February 2021, he played alongside his younger brother Moses for the first time, as both started for Stade Français in a 16–11 defeat to La Rochelle at Stade Marcel-Deflandre. After his side suffered their largest defeat to city rivals Racing 92 in a 53-20 European Rugby Champions Cup reverse in April 2022, Alo-Emile hit out at critics of the performance on Twitter. In his tweet he took aim at 'A lot of experts coming out with their opinions, assuming they could do what we do. It's too easy to critique from the couch. Look up Theodore Roosevelt- It is not the critic who counts'.

Alo-Emile has been highlighted as integral to Stade Français, with Midi Olympique describing him as the 'cornerstone' of the Parisians' scrum. A strong scrummager that combines this skill with high technical ability, Alo-Emile has complemented the style of coach Gonzalo Quesada well, earning comparisons to the likes of Taniela Tupou and Nepo Laulala. However, he has also been criticised for moments of door discipline, with a red card after three minutes against Castres during a poor run of form for Stade Français singled out for particular criticism.

== International career ==
On 23 August 2019, he was named in Samoa's 34-man training squad for the 2019 Rugby World Cup, before being named in the final 31 on 31 August. In the tournament itself, he featured in all four matches from the bench. He was set to captain Samoa against the Barbarians at Twickenham Stadium in November 2021, but the game was cancelled due to COVID cases in the Barbarians camp. In August 2023, Alo-Emile was named in the Samoa squad for the 2023 Rugby World Cup, having started in Pacific Nations Cup games against Japan and Fiji.

== Personal life ==
Alo-Emile is a devout Christian and attends the Christian Assembly of Paris. In 2022, he spoke out about his mental health struggles, having missed the opening stages of the season because of related issues. He described his problems as so severe that he was hospitalised after almost taking his own life, recalling "I no longer wanted anything. I no longer had energy... I love my wife and children more than anything in the world, but this evil in me didn't allow me to see them anymore. I was no longer a person. My brain was sending me bad messages." He spoke of struggling to pinpoint why his struggles had emerged, speaking of long injury absences, the pressure of replacing Sergio Parisse as club captain, and the departure of close friend Tolu Latu from the club as influential in an interview with Midi Olympique. His speaking out about his struggles was cited as highly influential for others in the French game doing the same in 2023.

== Career statistics ==
=== Club summary ===
As of 15 June 2015

Season	Team	Games	Starts	Sub	Mins	Tries	Cons	Pens	Drops	Points	Yel	Red
2011	Force	0	0	0	0	0	0	0	0	0	0	0
2012	Rebels	3	0	3	23	0	0	0	0	0	0	0
2013	Rebels	16	3	13	393	1	0	0	0	5	0	0
2014	Rebels	15	3	12	499	0	0	0	0	0	0	0
2015	Rebels	16	9	7	942	0	0	0	0	0	0	0
Total		50	15	35	1857	1	0	0	0	5	0	0
