= Moses Alo-Emile =

Australian-born French rugby union player (born 2000)

- Born: 18 January 2000 (age 26) Brisbane, Australia
- Height: 187 cm (6 ft 2 in)
- Weight: 130 kg (287 lb; 20 st 7 lb)
- School: Brisbane State High School
- Notable relative: Paul Alo-Emile (brother)

Rugby union career
- Position: Prop
- Current team: Stade Français Paris
Senior career
Years	Team	Apps	(Points)
2018–	Stade Français Paris	140	(15)
- Correct as of 23 August 2026
International career
Years	Team	Apps	(Points)
2026–	France	1	(0)
- Correct as of 23 August 2026

Moses Alo-Emile (born 18 January 2000) is an Australian-born French rugby union player, who plays for Stade Français Paris. His preferred position is prop.

== Early career ==
Alo-Emile was born in Brisbane, Australia, and attended Brisbane State High School. In 2018, he moved to France, joining the Stade Français Paris academy, where his brother Paul had been playing since 2015.

== Professional career ==
Alo-Emile debuted for Stade Français against the Ospreys in December 2018. He would make his first start during the 2020/21 season, against La Rochelle. In October 2022, he signed a new deal with the side, before extending again in July 2024 having become an established member of the team.

Alo-Emile became a naturalised French citizen having lived in France for five years. In June 2026, he was included in the full France squad for the 2026 Nations Championship Southern Hemisphere Series. He would debut starting in France's fixture against Australia.
