= Takurō Matsunaga =

Takurō Matsunaga 松永 拓朗
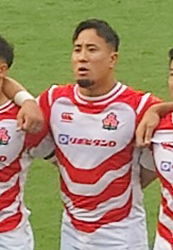
- Matsunaga with Japan in 2026
- Born: 13 August 1998 (age 28) Osaka, Japan
- Height: 172 cm (5 ft 8 in)
- Weight: 82 kg (181 lb; 12 st 13 lb)
- University: Tenri University

Rugby union career
- Position(s): Fly-half, Fullback
- Current team: Toshiba Brave Lupus
Youth career
- 2016: Osaka Sangyo University High School
- 2017–2020: Tenri University
Senior career
Years	Team	Apps	(Points)
2021–	Toshiba Brave Lupus	86	(325)
- Correct as of 11 August 2026
International career
Years	Team	Apps	(Points)
2025–2026	Japan XV	2	(19)
2024–	Japan	12	(79)
- Correct as of 24 October 2026

Takurō Matsunaga (Japanese: 松永 拓朗, romanized: Matsunaga Takurō; born 13 August 1998) is a Japanese professional rugby union player who currently plays as a fly-half for Japan Rugby League One club Toshiba Brave Lupus, and the Japan national team.

== Junior career ==
Matsunaga was born in Osaka Prefecture in 1998. Growing up, Matsunaga was active in karate and softball before first playing rugby at junior high school after being convinced to play by his softball coach.

In 2016, Matsunaga played rugby for Osaka Sangyo University Affiliated High School, before transitioning to Tenri University the following year, one of the top rugby schools in the Kansai region. Matsunaga played for Tenri throughout 2017 to early 2021. Playing at fly-half, Matsunaga led the team to their first ever All-Japan University Rugby Championship title in 2021, defeating Waseda University 55–28 at the National Stadium in Tokyo. It was also the first school from the Kansai region to win the competition in 36 years. Matsunaga had lost in the final of the All-Japan University Rugby Championship in 2018–19, which had been just their second final appearance ever and their first in seven years.

== Career ==
=== Toshiba Brave Lupus ===
In February 2021, the Top League club Toshiba Brave Lupus, based in Fuchū, Tokyo, signed seven players from university level, including Matsunaga and New Zealand-born lock Warner Dearns.

Matsunaga made his professional debut for Toshiba Brave Lupus in round six of the 2021 Top League season against the Honda Heat, coming on as a substitute for Matt Todd in the 72nd minute. In the teams following match, Matsunaga scored his first points for Toshiba, kicking a conversion goal in the 81st minute against the Munakata Sanix Blues after replacing fly-half Jack Stratton in the 76th minute.

In 2022, Matsunaga almost the entire season at fullback, scoring three tries in fifteen games. Toward the end of the season, Matsunaga covered the fly-half position, scoring 23 points from the tee in the teams final three games. Earlier in the season, goal-kicking duties being distributed between Tom Taylor, Hayata Nakao, and Takahiro Ogawa.

Remaining at fullback for the 2022–23 season, Matsunaga became the teams second goal-kicker behind Tom Taylor. He scored four tries across the 16-game season, with an increased scoring presence in the latter half of the season, including a great counter-attacking try against the Shizuoka Blue Revs after breaking through the oppositions midfield. Matsunaga scored 70 points in total, with a goal-kicking success rate of 71%.

With the introduction of New Zealand fly-half Richie Mo'unga into the team for 2023–24, Matsunaga had kicked just ten points from the tee for Toshiba, all coming in their round thirteen clash against the Kobe Steelers which ended in a 40-all draw. Toward the latter end of the season, Matsunaga had been one of the star players in the backline as the team finished second on the table following a 39-point win over the Shizuoka Blue Revs. On 26 May 2024 Matsunaga started at fullback for Toshiba as they defeated the Saitama Wild Knights 24–20 in the final to become Japanese rugby champions for the first time in 14 years.

At the end of the season, Matsunaga had graced the cover of issue No. 627 of the Rugby Magazine.

In the second round of the 2024–25 season, Matsunaga took over Toshiba's kicking duties from Richie Mo'unga. He converted eight of nine kicks and scored a try to earn Player of the Match. The performance was notable for Matsunaga whom had difficulties kicking at goal in his Test debut for Japan against Uruguay, where pressure from the 60-second shot clock contributed to four missed conversions. Having started the first half of the Toshiba match at fullback, Matsunaga moved to fly-half in the second half. Head coach Todd Blackadder praised his development, while Japan head coach Eddie Jones watched from the stands. Matsunaga remains focused on improving his consistency at both fly-half and fullback. In Toshiba's following match, Matsunaga remained the team goal kicker as Mo'unga was not in the squad due to a minor injury. Although his overall goal kicking success-rate declined slightly from the previous season, Matsunaga was Toshiba's top scorer in 2024–25. The team went on to win their second Japanese title, defeating the Kubota Spears 18–13 in the final.

== International career ==
In January 2018, Matsunaga was called up to the Japan U20 training squad ahead of their 2018 World Rugby U20 Championship campaign. Ultimately Matsunaga was not in the final squad for the tournament.

In October 2024, Matsunaga was named in a 39-man training squad for Japan's 2024 Autumn Internationals. Matsunaga made his international debut against New Zealand on 26 October 2024 at International Stadium Yokohama. Scoring a conversion goal in the 69th minute, following a try via Opeti Helu, Japan lost 19–64. Matsunaga played in Japan's remaining three Tests in the Autumn International window, scoring five points.

Matsunaga scored his first international try for Japan in the first Test of the 2025 Wales tour of Japan. In what was coach Eddie Jones's record 56th Test match in charge, Japan won the match 24–19 at the Mikuni World Stadium Kitakyushu. It was their first win against a tier one team since the 2019 Rugby World Cup, and their first win against Wales since 2013. Following the Test against Wales, Matsunaga made his international return months later against Hong Kong for the Japan XV team, kicking four conversion goals.

After an appearance for Japan XV in the June International Window against the Māori All Blacks, Matsunaga was recalled into the Japan squad for their inaugural 2026 Nations Championship Tests against Italy, Ireland and France. Scoring his second Test try, Matsunaga's Japan defeated Italy in their first round match of the Nations Championship, 27–10, their equal-record score against them. Matsunaga started at fullback in all three of Japan's Nations Championship Tests.

In Japan's Test Series against Australia, Matsunaga scored twelve points in their close defeat in Osaka, Matsunaga's home prefecture.

== Career statistics ==
=== Club ===
As of 11 August 2026.

Statistics by club, season and competition
Club	Season	League						
Club	Season	Division	Apps	Tries	Con.	Pen.	Drop	Points
Toshiba Brave Lupus	2021	Top League	2	0	1	0	0	2
Toshiba Brave Lupus	2022	Japan Rugby League One	15	3	5	2	0	31
Toshiba Brave Lupus	2022–23	Japan Rugby League One	16	4	16	6	0	70
Toshiba Brave Lupus	2023–24	Japan Rugby League One	17	2	5	0	0	20
Toshiba Brave Lupus	2024–25	Japan Rugby League One	17	7	65	3	0	174
Toshiba Brave Lupus	2025–26	Japan Rugby League One	19	2	3	4	0	28
Toshiba Brave Lupus	Total		86	18	95	15	0	325

=== International ===
As of 11 August 2026.

Statistics by team and year
Team	Year	Statistic					
Team	Year	Apps	Tries	Con.	Pen.	Drop	Points
Japan XV	2024	1	0	4	0	0	8
Japan XV	2026	1	1	3	0	0	11
Total		2	1	7	0	0	19
Japan	2024	4	0	2	1	0	7
Japan	2025	1	1	0	0	0	5
Japan	2026	4	1	9	7	0	44
Total		9	2	11	8	0	56

=== International tries ===
List of international tries scored by Takurō Matsunaga
No.	Opponent	Location	Competition	Date	Result	Ref.
1	Wales	Mikuni World Stadium Kitakyushu, Kitakyushu	2025 Wales tour of Japan	5 July 2025	24–19	
2	Italy	Chichibunomiya Rugby Stadium, Aoyama	2026 Nations Championship	4 July 2026	27–10	

== Awards and honours ==
Toshiba Brave Lupus

- Japan Rugby League One: 2023–24, 2024–25

Individual

- Japan Rugby League One Best XV: 2024–25
