= History of rugby union matches between Australia and Ireland =

Since 1927, Australia and Ireland have competed against each other in rugby union in forty matches, Australia having won twenty-two, Ireland seventeen, with one draw. Their first meeting was on 12 November 1927, and was won 5–3 by Australia. Their most recent meeting took place in Sydney, New South Wales on 4 July 2026 as part of the 2026 Nations Championship, and was won 33–31 by Ireland.

Ireland have faced Australia five times in Rugby World Cup play, with Australia winning the first four before Ireland finally won in Eden Park in 2011.

Since 1999 the two sides have competed for the Lansdowne Cup. The Cup is currently held by Ireland, having defeated Australia in their most recent fixture in 2026.

== Summary ==
=== Overall ===
Details	Played	Won by Australia	Won by Ireland	Drawn	Australia points	Ireland points
In Australia	17	11	6	0	421	291
In Ireland	22	11	10	1	388	343
Neutral venue	1	0	1	0	6	15
Overall	40	22	17	1	815	649

=== Records ===
Note: Date shown in brackets indicates when the record was or last set.

Record	Australia	Ireland
Longest winning streak	11 (21 November 1981 – 9 November 2002)	6 (16 June 2018 – present)
Largest points for
Home	46 (12 June 1999)	46 (15 November 2025)
Away	42 (31 October 1992)	33 (4 July 2026)
Neutral	6 (17 September 2011)	15 (17 September 2011)
Largest winning margin
Home	36 (12 June 1999)	27 (15 November 2025)
Away	25 (31 October 1992)	15 (3 June 1979)
Neutral	—N/a	9 (17 September 2011)

=== Attendance ===
Up to date as of 4 July 2026.

Total attendance	1,710,559
Average attendance	42,764
Highest attendance	69,886; Ireland 20–20 Australia; 15 November 2009

== Results ==
No.	Date	Venue	Score	Winner	Competition	Attendance	Ref.
1	12 November 1927	Lansdowne Road, Dublin	3–5	Australia	1927–28 New South Wales tour of Great Britain, Ireland and France	25,000	
2	6 December 1947	Lansdowne Road, Dublin	3–16	Australia	1947–48 Australia tour of Great Britain, Ireland, France and North America	50,000	
3	18 January 1958	Lansdowne Road, Dublin	9–6	Ireland	1957–58 Australia tour of Great Britain, Ireland and France	33,000	
4	21 January 1967	Lansdowne Road, Dublin	15–8	Ireland	1966–67 Australia tour of Great Britain, Ireland and France	54,000	
5	13 May 1967	Sydney Cricket Ground, Sydney	5–11	Ireland	1967 Ireland tour of Australia	32,605	
6	26 October 1968	Lansdowne Road, Dublin	10–3	Ireland	1968 Australia tour of Great Britain and Ireland	28,000	
7	17 January 1976	Lansdowne Road, Dublin	10–20	Australia	1975–76 Australia tour of Great Britain, Ireland and the United States	52,000	
8	3 June 1979	Ballymore Stadium, Brisbane	12–27	Ireland	1979 Ireland tour of Australia	16,500	
9	16 June 1979	Sydney Cricket Ground, Sydney	3–9	Ireland	1979 Ireland tour of Australia	33,476	
10	21 November 1981	Lansdowne Road, Dublin	12–16	Australia	1981–82 Australia tour of Great Britain and Ireland	54,000	
11	10 November 1984	Lansdowne Road, Dublin	9–16	Australia	1984 Australia tour of Great Britain and Ireland	35,600	
12	7 June 1987	Concord Oval, Sydney	33–15	Australia	1987 Rugby World Cup	14,856	
13	20 October 1991	Lansdowne Road, Dublin	18–19	Australia	1991 Rugby World Cup	54,500	
14	31 October 1992	Lansdowne Road, Dublin	17–42	Australia	1992 Australia tour of Great Britain and Ireland	54,500	
15	5 June 1994	Ballymore Stadium, Brisbane	33–13	Australia	1994 Ireland tour of Australia	26,545	
16	11 June 1994	Sydney Cricket Ground, Sydney	32–18	Australia	1994 Ireland tour of Australia	37,239	
17	23 November 1996	Lansdowne Road, Dublin	12–22	Australia	1996 Australia tour of Great Britain, Ireland and Italy	52,000	
18	12 June 1999	Ballymore Stadium, Brisbane	46–10	Australia	1999 Ireland tour of Australia	24,177	
19	19 June 1999	Subiaco Oval, Perth	32–26	Australia	1999 Ireland tour of Australia	26,267	
20	10 October 1999	Lansdowne Road, Dublin	3–23	Australia	1999 Rugby World Cup	49,250	
21	9 November 2002	Lansdowne Road, Dublin	18–9	Ireland	2002 end-of-year rugby union internationals	49,000	
22	7 June 2003	Subiaco Oval, Perth	45–16	Australia	2003 Ireland tour of Australia, Samoa and Tonga	40,000	
23	1 November 2003	Docklands Stadium, Melbourne	17–16	Australia	2003 Rugby World Cup	54,206	
24	19 November 2005	Lansdowne Road, Dublin	14–30	Australia	2005 end of year rugby union tests	42,000	
25	24 June 2006	Subiaco Oval, Perth	37–15	Australia	2006 mid-year rugby test series	38,200	
26	19 November 2006	Lansdowne Road, Dublin	21–6	Ireland	2006 end of year rugby union tests	42,000	
27	14 June 2008	Docklands Stadium, Melbourne	18–12	Australia	2008 mid-year rugby test series	47,500	
28	15 November 2009	Croke Park, Dublin	20–20	draw	2009 end of year rugby union tests	69,886	
29	26 June 2010	Lang Park, Brisbane	22–15	Australia	2010 mid-year rugby test series	45,498	
30	17 September 2011	Eden Park, Auckland (New Zealand)	15–6	Ireland	2011 Rugby World Cup	58,678	
31	16 November 2013	Aviva Stadium, Dublin	15–32	Australia	2013 end-of-year rugby union tests	51,000	
32	22 November 2014	Aviva Stadium, Dublin	26–23	Ireland	2014 end-of-year rugby union tests	51,100	
33	26 November 2016	Aviva Stadium, Dublin	27–24	Ireland	2016 end-of-year rugby union internationals	51,000	
34	9 June 2018	Lang Park, Brisbane	18–9	Australia	2018 Ireland tour of Australia	46,273	
35	16 June 2018	Melbourne Rectangular Stadium, Melbourne	21–26	Ireland	2018 Ireland tour of Australia	29,018	
36	23 June 2018	Stadium Australia, Sydney	16–20	Ireland	2018 Ireland tour of Australia	44,085	
37	19 November 2022	Aviva Stadium, Dublin	13–10	Ireland	2022 end-of-year rugby union internationals	51,700	
38	30 November 2024	Aviva Stadium, Dublin	22–19	Ireland	2024 end-of-year rugby union internationals	51,700	
39	15 November 2025	Aviva Stadium, Dublin	46–19	Ireland	2025 end-of-year rugby union internationals	51,700	
40	4 July 2026	Allianz Stadium, Sydney	31–33	Ireland	2026 Nations Championship Southern Hemisphere Series	42,500	

== List of series ==
Played	Won by Australia	Won by Ireland	Drawn
5	2	3	0

Year	Australia	Ireland	Series winner	Lansdowne Cup
1967	0	1	Ireland	Not contested
1979	0	2	Ireland	Not contested
1994	2	0	Australia	Not contested
1999	2	0	Australia	
2018	1	2	Ireland	

== Images ==
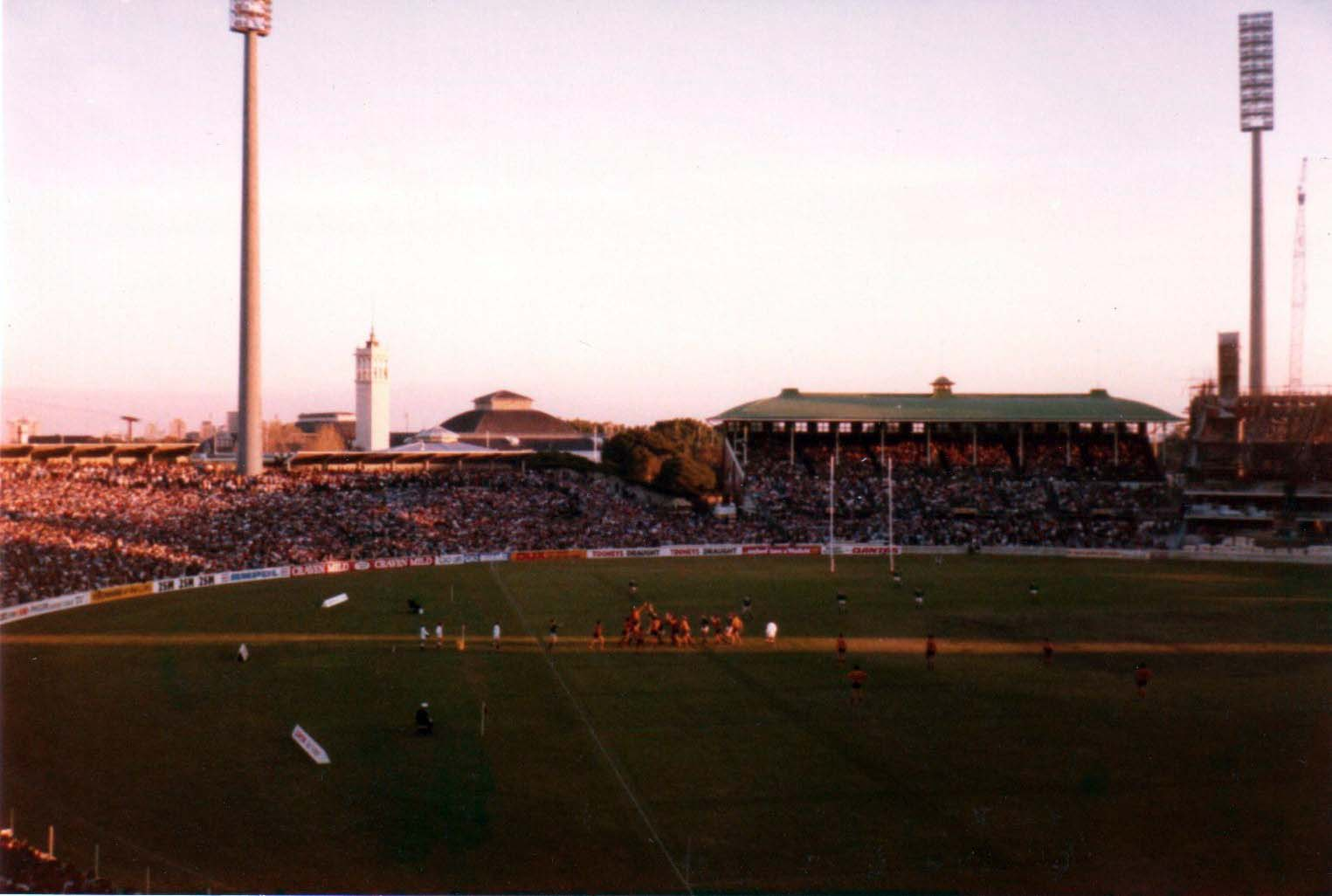
An Ireland line-out in the 2nd test against Australia in Sydney, 1979.

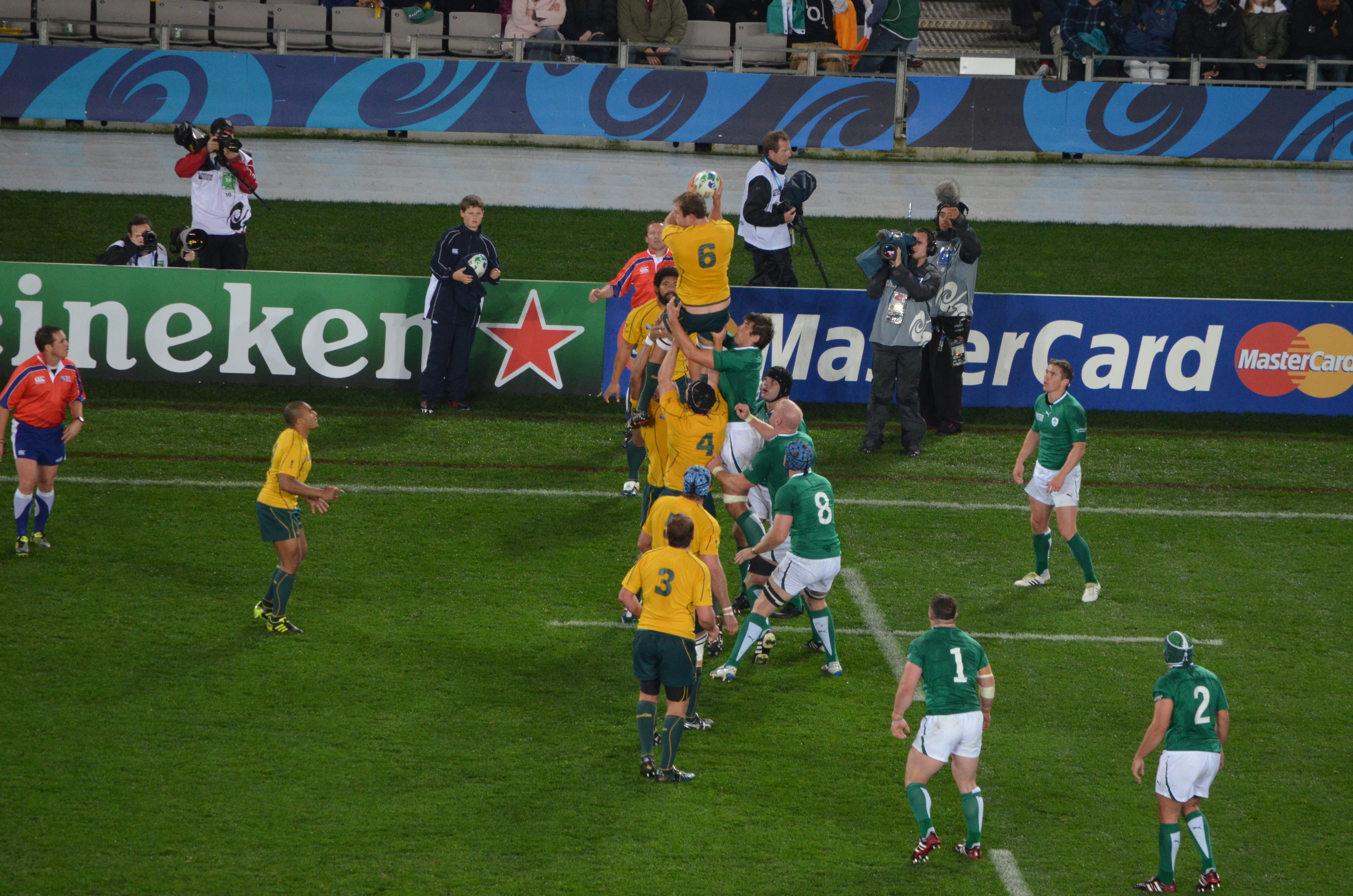
Australia claim a line-out during their 2011 Rugby World Cup match with Ireland in New Zealand.

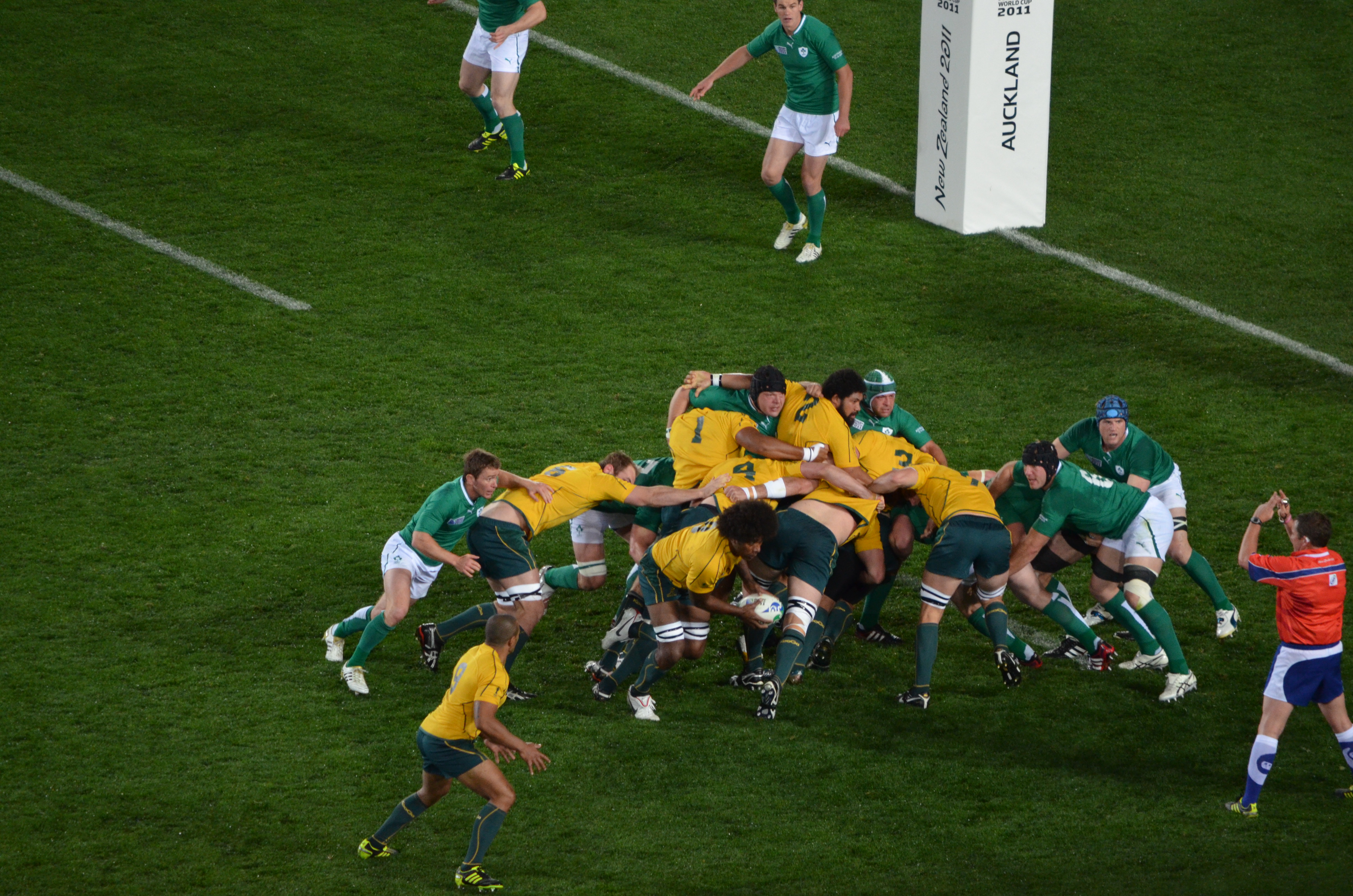
Radike Samo takes the ball from the back of the scrum during Australia's 2011 Rugby World Cup match with Ireland.

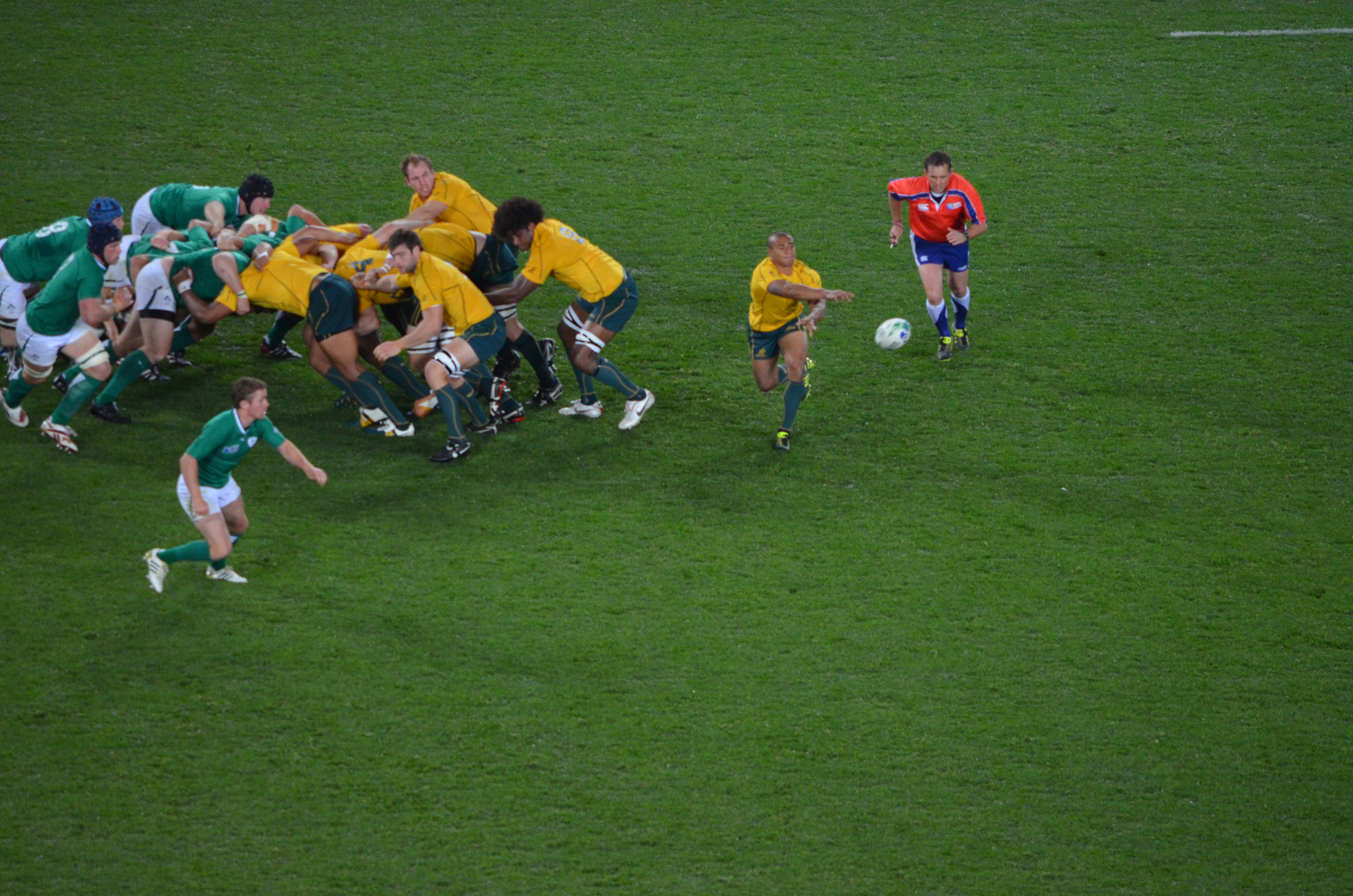
Will Genia throws a pass during Australia's 2011 Rugby World Cup match with Ireland.
