= Tomas Rapetti =

Argentina international rugby union player (born 2002)

- Born: 4 March 2005 (age 21)
- Height: 190 cm (6 ft 3 in)
- Weight: 125 kg (276 lb; 19 st 10 lb)

Rugby union career
- Position: Prop
- Current team: Stade Toulousain
Senior career
| Years | Team | Apps | (Points) |
- Asociación Alumni
| 2024–2025 | Pampas | | |
| 2025– | Toulouse | 0 | (0) |
- Correct as of 21 August 2025
International career
| Years | Team | Apps | (Points) |
| 2023-2025 | Argentina U20 | | |
| 2025– | Argentina | 1 | (0) |
- Correct as of 7 October 2025

Tomás Rapetti (born 4 March 2005) is an Argentine professional rugby union footballer who plays as a prop forward for Stade Toulousain and Argentina.

== Club career ==
He played domestically in Argentina for Asociación Alumni and then for Pampas in 2024 and 2025. He was named in the Super Rugby Americas team of the year in June 2025 as Pampas reached the semi-finals. That month, he signed for Stade Toulousain in France.

== International career ==
He played for Argentina U20 at the 2023 World Rugby U20 Championship. He was called up to the senior Argentina national rugby union team for the first time in August 2025. He made his senior debut for Argentina as a replacement against South Africa at Twickenham in October 2025.

== Personal life ==
From Buenos Aires, his father, Juan José Rapetti, played for rugby union for Mariano Moreno, and Banco Nacion clubs in Argentina, as well as playing in Europe for AS Béziers Hérault and for L'Aquila Rugby in Italy.
