= 2021 Oceania Rugby Under 20 Championship =

2021 Oceania Rugby U20 Championship

Cancelled

Teams
- Championship: Australia; New Zealand
- Trophy: Samoa; Tonga

The 2021 Oceania Rugby Under 20 Championship, was a planned competition for national junior men's rugby union teams that was cancelled due to impacts of the COVID-19 pandemic. The first division Oceania Junior Championship was originally scheduled for July as a two-match series between Australia and New Zealand at Bond University on the Gold Coast, but was initially postponed due to Australian border restrictions associated with the pandemic, then subsequently cancelled. New Zealand played some domestic Under-20 fixtures during June and July, but Australia suspended its Junior Wallabies program for the year. The lower division Oceania Under 20 Trophy match between Samoa and Tonga planned for 22 May was also cancelled due to travel restrictions related to the pandemic.
