= Ben Warren (rugby union) =

Welsh rugby union player

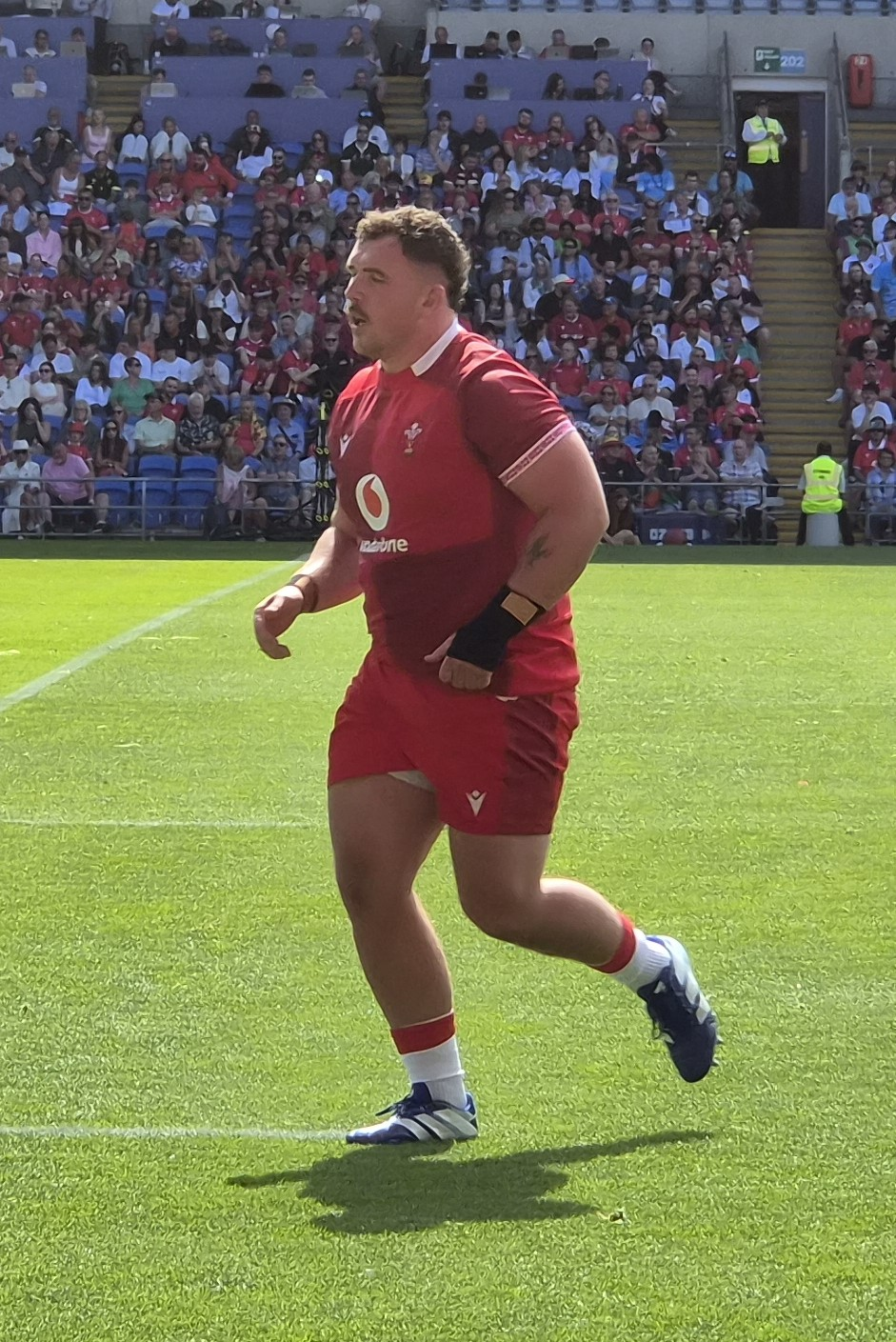
- 2026 Nations Championship in Cardiff, Wales
- Born: 24 April 2000 (age 26) Llantrisant, Wales
- Height: 185 cm (6 ft 1 in)
- Weight: 122 kg (269 lb; 19 st 3 lb)
- School: Coleg y Cymoedd

Rugby union career
- Position: Tighthead Prop
- Current team: Ospreys
Senior career
Years	Team	Apps	(Points)
2022–	Ospreys	45	(5)
International career
Years	Team	Apps	(Points)
2019–2020	Wales U20	15	(5)
2026–	Wales	1	(0)

Ben Warren (born 24 April 2000) is a Welsh rugby union player who plays for the Ospreys as a prop.

== Club career ==
=== Cardiff Blues ===
Warren started playing for Ystrad Rhondda RFC, originally as a number 8, before moving to prop. Warren played for Rhondda Schools in the Dewar Shield, before moving to Coleg y Cymoedd. He was a member of the Cardiff Blues academy, but did not feature for the senior team.

=== Ospreys ===
On 6 April 2021, Warren signed for the Ospreys.

Warren made his debut on 29 October 2022 coming off the bench against Connacht.

Warren signed an extension on 10 July 2023, and agreed to a further contract extension on 27 March 2025.

== International career ==
=== Wales U20 ===
Previously part of Wales U16 and U18, Warren was selected for Wales U20 for the 2019 Six Nations Under 20s Championship. He started in the opening match against France U20.

=== Wales ===
Warren trained with Wales ahead of their 2024 mid-year rugby union tests fixture against South Africa, but was not called-up to the full team, and did not travel to Australia.

Warren was called up on 27 January 2025 for the 2025 Six Nations Championship, following an injury to WillGriff John.

On 17 November 2025, Warren was once more called up by Wales, for the remainder of the 2025 end-of-year rugby union internationals.

Warren made his debut for Wales on 4 July 2026, coming off the bench against Fiji.
