= Michael Stolberg =

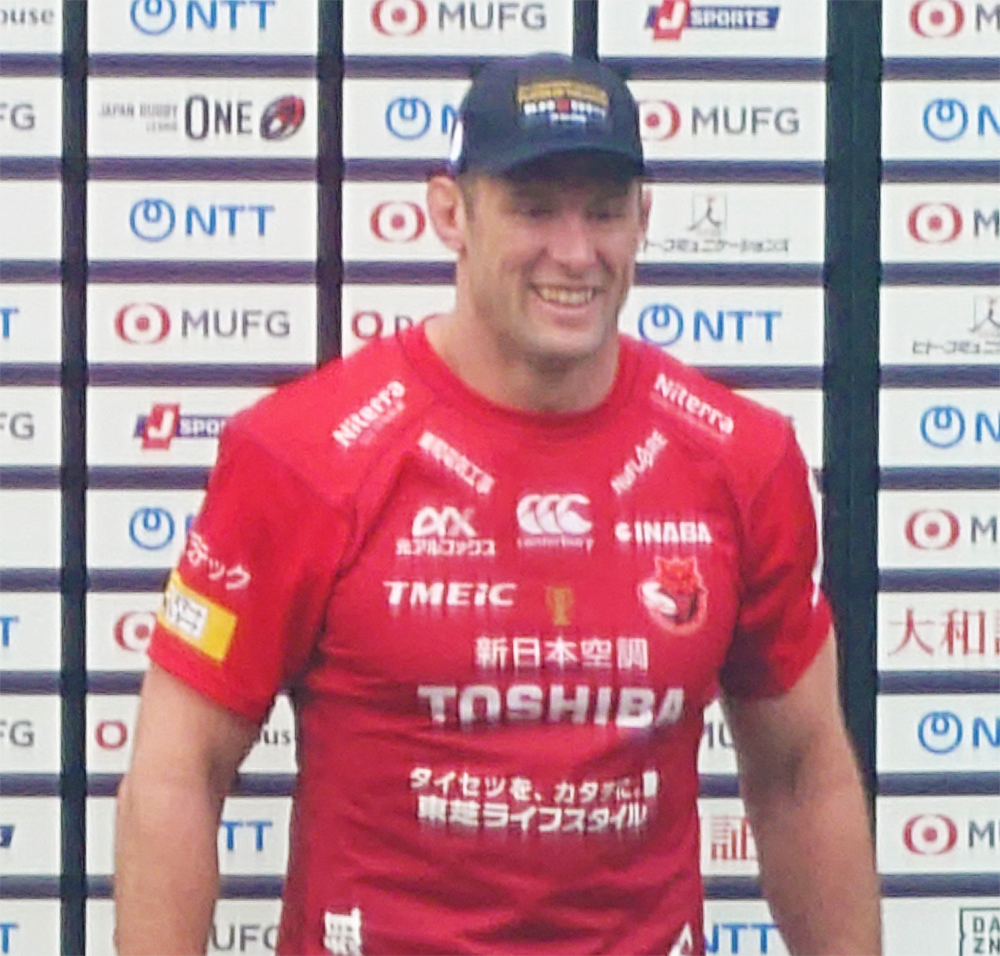
- Stolberg with Toshiba Brave Lupus in 2026
- Born: 27 March 1992 (age 34) Caloundra, Queensland, Australia
- Height: 204 cm (6 ft 8 in)
- Weight: 120 kg (260 lb; 18 st 13 lb)

Rugby union career
- Position(s): Lock, Flanker
Senior career
Years	Team	Apps	(Points)
2016–2021	Kintetsu Liners	55	(85)
2022–2025	Ricoh Black Rams	51	(55)
2025–	Toshiba Brave Lupus	19	(25)
Provincial / State sides
Years	Team	Apps	(Points)
2014–2015	Northland	20	(10)
Super Rugby
Years	Team	Apps	(Points)
2020	Sunwolves	6	(10)
2020	Rebels	7	(0)
International career
Years	Team	Apps	(Points)
2026–	Japan	10	(5)

Michael Stolberg (born 27 March 1992) is a professional rugby union player currently playing for the Toshiba Brave Lupus in the Japanese Rugby League One Competition.

== Rugby career ==
Stolberg's first representative honour was in 2007 with selection in the Queensland Under 15 team. From here he was identified and offered a scholarship from the Anglican Church Grammar School. During his two years at The Anglican Church Grammar School he was a member of the ARU National Talent Squad.

Stolberg joined Easts Rugby Union in 2010 and played one year of Premier Colts and continued with the club's Premier Grade team from 2011 - 2013. During this time he was a member of the Queensland Reds Academy for 2011 and the ARU's National Academy from 2012-2013.

In 2014 Stolberg was signed by the Northland Rugby Union to play in New Zealand's ITM Cup (now Mitre10 Cup) and continued with the club for the 2015 season.

Stolberg joined the Kintetsu Liners in the Japanese Top League for the 2016/17 season and played the 2017/18, 2018/19, 2019/20 and 2020/21 seasons for them. Michael captained a number of games for the Kintetsu Liners in the 2019/20 season and captained all games during the 2020/21 season.

In May 2021 Kintetsu announced Stolberg was leaving the team.

== Career statistics ==
As of 16 December 2019.

Season	Competition	Team	Games	Starts	Sub	Mins Played	Tries	Points
2014	ITM Cup	Northland	10	1	9	273	1	5
2015	ITM Cup	Northland	10	7	3	582	1	5
2016–17	Top League	Kintetsu Liners	14	11	3	892	2	10
2017–18	Top League	Kintetsu Liners	10	2	8	300	2	10
2018	Top Challenge League	Kintetsu Liners	10	4	6	471	7	35
2019	Top Challenge League	Kintetsu Liners	7	7	0	548	3	15

=== Super Rugby statistics ===
As of 12 September 2020

Season	Team	Games	Starts	Sub	Mins	Tries	Cons	Pens	Drops	Points	Yel	Red
2020	Sunwolves	6	6	0	480	2	0	0	0	10	0	0
2020 AU	Rebels	7	2	5	203	0	0	0	0	0	0	0
Total		13	8	5	683	2	0	0	0	10	0	0
