= 2026 men's rugby union internationals =

Outside of the 2026 Nations Championship, the 2026 World Rugby Nations Cup, the 2026 Six Nations Championship and other regional tournaments, a series of international matches will be played throughout the year. New Zealand will play an eight-match tour of South Africa, playing against the United Rugby Championship (URC) sides and four tests against the South Africa national team, with the fourth test being played at M&T Bank Stadium in Baltimore. Similarly, Australia and Japan will embark on a home-and-away tour of each other for the first time in their history; the former following that series with a tour of Argentina.

== Series and tours ==
=== Series ===
Series	Result	Winner
Argentina–Australia test series	0–1 (Note: Australia won the two-test series 1–0 following a draw in the second test.)	Australia
Australia–Japan test series	2–0	Australia
Bledisloe Cup test series	2–0	New Zealand
2026 Greatest Rivalry tour	3–1	South Africa

== February ==
6 February 2026
17:30 CET (UTC+1)

Italy XV	24–24	Scotland A
Try: Gasperini 30' c Casartelli 36' c Gallorini 52' c Con: Montemauri (3/3) 31', 37', 40'; Pen: Montemauri (1/1) 57'	Report	Try: Hiddleston 17' c Rowe (2) 38' m, 61' m Redpath 49' c Con: Burke (2/4) 18', 50'

Stadio Centro d'Italia, Rieti
Referee: Daniele Pompa (Italy)

6 February 2026
17:30 CET (UTC+1)

Ireland XV	14–42	England A
Try: Gleeson 23' c Kenny 38' c Con: Frawley (2/2) 24, 38'	Report	Try: Roots (2) 8' c, 78' c Searle 17' m Hassell-Collins (2) 28' m, 50' c Randall 35' c Kloska 43' c Murley 61' c Con: Searle (5/7) 9', 35', 44', 51', 62'; Atkinson (1/1) 79'

Thomond Park, Limerick
Referee: Benoit Rousselet (France)

== March ==
6 March 2026
17:00 CET (UTC+1)

Italy XV	33–26	Chile
Try: Mazza 14' c Brisighella 34' c Gasperini 44' c Ciardullo-Oro 69' m Belloni 72' c Con: Brisighella (3/3) 15', 35', 45'; Montemauri (1/2) 72'	Report	Try: Gurruchaga (2) 10' c, 55' c Fernández 40' m Kennedy 80' c Con: Garafulic (2/3) 11', 56'; Cruz Reyes (1/1) 80'

Stadio Tommaso Fattori, L'Aquila
Referee: Franco Rosella (Italy)

21 March 2026
13:30 CET (UTC+1)

Gibraltar	13–37	Sweden
Try: Morris 17' c Con: Morris (1/1) 18'; Pen: Morris 37'	Report	Try: MacAodha 21' c Neilson 26' m Nylèn 28' m Fryxell 40' m Fransson 55' m Carlsson 70' m K Nilsson 80+4' m Con: Nylèn (1/4) 22'; Cards: Xhizasnishvili (yellow card) 80'

Europa Point Stadium, Gibraltar
Referee: Harry Parsons (England)

21 March 2026
19:00 EET (UTC+2)

Greece	22–12	Kosovo
	Report

Municipal stadium, Haidari

== April ==
3 April 2026
14:00 CEST (UTC+2)

Czech Republic	54–27	Mexico
Try: Surga 3' m Havel 18' c Sehnal (2) 22' c, 74' c Sklensky 45' c Komarek (2) 53' c, 80' c Skop 57' c Con: Fojtik (3/4) 19', 23', 46'; Pracka (4/4) 54', 57', 75', 80'	Report	Try: Gaballero (2) 27' m, 50' c Nichols 32' m Martinez 63' c Con: Alvarez (2/4) 51', 63'; Pen: Alvarez (1/1) 8'

Markéta Stadium, Prague
Referee: Nicolae Fratila (Romania)

10 April 2026
19:00 CEST (UTC+2)

Croatia	17–33	Mexico
Try: Proloscic 17' m Proloscic 32' c Vlasic 77' m Con: Vranesevic (1/3) 33'	Report	Try: Gaballero 5' c Diaz 48' c Olivo 56' c Zuzaeta 73' m Rodriguez 80' c Con: Alvarez (3/4) 6', 49', 57'; Rodriguez (1/1) 80'

Stadion Park Mladeži, Split
Referee: Marco Sanatelli (Italy)

25 April 2026
15:30 CAT (UTC+2)

Zimbabwe	43–31	Zambia

Harare Sports Club, Harare

== May ==
2 May 2026
15:30 CAT (UTC+2)

Zimbabwe	17–7	Zambia

Hartsfield Rugby Grounds, Bulawayo

15 May 2026
20:00 AST (UTC+3)

Qatar	58–12	Saudi Arabia
Try: Botha (2) 6' m, 28' c Weber 15' m Hughes (2) 38' m, 55' m Lock 41' c Raper 48' m Swart 60' m Onsare 70' c Ekron 80+2' m Con: Swart (4/10) 16', 29', 42', 71'	Report	Try: Wheeler 22' c Karaali 76' m Con: Wheeler (1/1) 22'

Onaiza Park, Doha
Referee: Joanna Bezuidenhout (Qatar)

== June ==
19 June 2026
18:15 CEST (UTC+02)

France XV	35–19	England XV
Try: Depoortère 8' c Arfeuil 20' c Le Garrec 46' c Hastoy 50' c Brau-Boirie 78' c Con: Hastoy (4/4) 9', 21', 47', 51'; Desperes (1/1) 79'	Report	Try: Murley 1' m M Smith 40' c Ojomoh 80+2' c Con: Ford (2/3) 40+1', 80+3'

Stade de la Rabine, Vannes
Attendance: 12,042
Referee: Gianluca Gnecchi (Italy)

Team details

FB	15	Théo Attissogbe
RW	14	Christian Ambadiang
OC	13	Nicolas Depoortère	(substituted off) 54'
IC	12	Yoram Moefana
LW	11	Grégoire Arfeuil	(substituted off) 21'
FH	10	Antoine Hastoy
SH	9	Nolann Le Garrec	(substituted off) 51'
N8	8	Marko Gazzotti
OF	7	Esteban Capilla	(substituted off) 44'
BF	6	Temo Matiu
RL	5	Tom Staniforth
LL	4	Mickaël Guillard (c)	(substituted off) 51'
TP	3	Sipili Falatea	(substituted off) 44'
HK	2	Maxime Lamothe	(substituted off) 51'
LP	1	Jefferson Poirot	(substituted off) 51'
Replacements:
HK	16	Barnabé Massa	(substituted on) 51'
PR	17	Reda Wardi	(substituted on) 51'
PR	18	Régis Montagne	(substituted on) 44'
LK	19	Boris Palu	(substituted on) 51'
BR	20	Killian Tixeront	(substituted on) 44'
SH	21	Baptiste Jauneau	(substituted on) 51'
FH	22	Axel Desperes	(substituted on) 21'
CE	23	Fabien Brau-Boirie	(substituted on) 54'
Coach:
(France) Fabien Galthié

FB	15	Marcus Smith
RW	14	Noah Caluori
OC	13	Max Ojomoh
IC	12	Seb Atkinson	(substituted off) 51'
LW	11	Cadan Murley	(substituted off) 51'
FH	10	George Ford
SH	9	Harry Randall (c)	(substituted off) 51'
N8	8	Alex Dombrandt
OF	7	Tom Curry	(substituted off) 51'
BF	6	Ted Hill
RL	5	George Martin	(substituted off) 51'
LL	4	Charlie Ewels
TP	3	George Kloska	(substituted off) 51'
HK	2	Theo Dan	(substituted off) 51'
LP	1	Asher Opoku-Fordjour	(substituted off) 51'
Replacements:
HK	16	Jamie Blamire	(substituted on) 51'
PR	17	Beno Obano	(substituted on) 51'
PR	18	Vilikesa Sela	(substituted on) 51'
LK	19	Nick Isiekwe	(substituted on) 51'
BR	20	Jack Kenningham	(substituted on) 51'
SH	21	Raffi Quirke	(substituted on) 51'
CE	22	Benhard Janse van Rensburg	(substituted on) 51'
WG	23	Adam Radwan	(substituted on) 51'
Coach:
(England) Steve Borthwick

Assistant referees:
Julien Caulier (France)
Ludovic Carrillo (France)
Television match official:
Philippe Bonhoure (France)

20 June 2026
12:00 SAST (UTC+2)

South Africa A	40–0	Zimbabwe
Try: Ahmed 17' c Muller 21' c Pead 31' c Steyn 54' c Khan 67' c Williams 80' m Con: Ahmed (3/3) 18', 22', 32'; Giliomee (2/3) 55', 68'	Report

Nelson Mandela Bay Stadium, Gqeberha
Referee: Aimee Barrett-Theron (South Africa)

Team details

FB	15	Luan Giliomee
RW	14	Jaco Williams
OC	13	Markus Muller
IC	12	Lukhanyo Am
LW	11	Zekhethelo Siyaya		(substituted off) 35'
FH	10	Yaqeen Ahmed	(red card) 51'
SH	9	Haashim Pead		(substituted off) 40'
N8	8	Phepsi Buthelezi		(substituted off) 54'
OF	7	Bathobele Hlekani		(substituted off) 49'
BF	6	Emmanuel Tshituka
RL	5	Ruben van Heerden
LL	4	Vincent Tshituka (c)
TP	3	Neethling Fouche		(substituted off) 49'
HK	2	Siphosethu Mnebelele		(substituted off) 61'
LP	1	Boan Venter		(substituted off) 61'
Replacements:
HK	16	Liam van Wyk		(substituted on) 61'
PR	17	Oliver Reid		(substituted on) 61'
PR	18	Hanro Jacobs		(substituted on) 49'
LK	19	Adré Smith		(substituted on) 54'
BR	20	Siba Mahashe		(substituted on) 49'
SH	21	Nico Steyn		(substituted on) 40'	(substituted off) 65'	(substituted on) 71'
SH	22	Imad Khan			(substituted on) 65'
WG	23	Jurenzo Julius		(substituted on) 35'
Coach:
(South Africa) Mzwandile Stick

FB	15	Tapiwa Mafura	(substituted off) 52'	(substituted on) 61'
RW	14	Trevor Gurwe		(substituted off) 61'
OC	13	Brandon Mudzekenyedzi
IC	12	Kudzai Mashawi
LW	11	Edward Sigauke
FH	10	Bruce Houston
SH	9	Hilton Mudariki (c)	(substituted off) 65'
N8	8	Tinotenda Mavesere
OF	7	Dylan Utete	(substituted off) 65'
BF	6	Simbarashe Siraha
RL	5	Gary Porter	(substituted off) 68'
LL	4	Kudakwashe Nyakufaringwa	(substituted off) 59'
TP	3	Bornwell Gwinji	(substituted off) 31'
HK	2	Simba Mandioma	(substituted off) 63'
LP	1	Victor Mupunga	(substituted off) 61'
Replacements:
HK	16	Liam Larkan	(substituted on) 63'
PR	17	Tijde Visser	(substituted on) 61'
PR	18	Michael Kumbirai	(substituted on) 31'
LK	19	Daniel Cooke	(substituted on) 68'
LK	20	Tadiwanashe Gwashu	(substituted on) 59'
BR	21	Aiden Burnett	(substituted on) 65'
SH	22	Keegan Joubert	(substituted on) 65'
CE	23	Dion Khumalo	(substituted on) 52'
Coach:
(Zimbabwe) Pieter Benade

Player of the Match:
Ruben van Heerden (South Africa)

Assistant referees:
Sean Muller (South Africa)
Dylen November (South Africa)
Television match official:
Marius Jonker (South Africa)
Foul play review officer:
Marius van der Westhuizen (South Africa)

20 June 2026
15:00 SAST (UTC+2)

South Africa	80–31	Barbarians
Try: E. van der Merwe (3) 4' c, 14' c, 57' m Du Toit 11' c Wiese 19' c Norton 24' c Kolbe 40+2' m Kotze 47' c De Klerk 63' m Kriel 73' c Esterhuizen 75' c Porthen 80' c Con: Kolbe (8/10) 5', 12', 15', 20', 25', 48', 64', 74'; Moyo 80+1'	Report	Try: Vakatawa 9' c Molina 31' c Kellaway (2) 35' m, 61' m Perenara 37' c Con: Albornoz (3/5) 10', 32', 38'

Nelson Mandela Bay Stadium, Gqeberha
Attendance: 26,398
Referee: Morné Ferreira (South Africa)

Team details

FB	15	Aphelele Fassi	(yellow card) 43'	(substituted off) 53'	(substituted on) 64'
RW	14	Cheslin Kolbe
OC	13	Jesse Kriel
IC	12	André Esterhuizen
LW	11	Edwill van der Merwe			(substituted off) 64'
FH	10	Quan Horn			(substituted off) 64'
SH	9	Grant Williams	(yellow card) 30'	(substituted off) 55'	(substituted on) 64'
N8	8	Jasper Wiese		(substituted off) 46'
OF	7	Pieter-Steph du Toit		(substituted off) 46'	(substituted on) 56'
BF	6	Siya Kolisi (c)		(substituted off) 46'
RL	5	Franco Mostert			(substituted off) 56'
LL	4	Riley Norton
TP	3	Carlü Sadie		(substituted off) 46'
HK	2	Andre-Hugo Venter		(substituted off) 44'	(substituted on) 53'	(substituted off) 56'
LP	1	Ox Nche		(substituted off) 46'
Replacements:
HK	16	JJ Kotze		(substituted on) 44'	(substituted off) 54'	(substituted on) 56'
PR	17	Ntuthuko Mchunu		(substituted on) 46'
PR	18	Zachary Porthen		(substituted on) 46'
LK	19	Ben-Jason Dixon		(substituted on) 46'
FL	20	Paul de Villiers		(substituted on) 46'
BR	21	Evan Roos		(substituted on) 46'
SH	22	Faf de Klerk		(substituted on) 55'
WG	23	Vusi Moyo		(substituted on) 53'
Coach:
(South Africa) Rassie Erasmus

FB	15	(South Africa) Warrick Gelant
RW	14	(Australia) Andrew Kellaway
OC	13	(France) Virimi Vakatawa
IC	12	(New Zealand) Alex Nankivell
LW	11	(Scotland) Duhan van der Merwe		(substituted off) 53'
FH	10	(Argentina) Tomás Albornoz		(substituted off) 55'
SH	9	(New Zealand) TJ Perenara (c)	(yellow card) 11'	(substituted off) 64'
N8	8	(Samoa) Miracle Faiʻilagi	(yellow card) 13'
OF	7	(New Zealand) Lachlan Boshier
BF	6	(Argentina) Guido Petti		(substituted off) 74'
RL	5	(Australia) Izack Rodda		(substituted off) 53'
LL	4	(Argentina) Franco Molina
TP	3	(Scotland) D'Arcy Rae		(substituted off) 46'
HK	2	(Wales) Elliot Dee	(yellow card) 52'	(substituted off) 63'
LP	1	(Argentina) Mayco Vivas		(substituted off) 46'
Replacements:
HK	16	(Argentina) Leonel Oviedo		(substituted on) 53'
PR	17	(Scotland) Oli Kebble		(substituted on) 46'
PR	18	(Argentina) Pedro Delgado		(substituted on) 46'
LK	19	(South Africa) Sintu Manjezi		(substituted on) 74'
FL	20	(Scotland) Liam McConnell		(substituted on) 53'
SH	21	(Uruguay) Santiago Arata		(substituted on) 64'
FH	22	(New Zealand) Harry Plummer		(substituted on) 55'
CE	23	(Fiji) Tuidraki Samusamuvodre		(substituted on) 63'
Coach:
(New Zealand) Scott Robertson

Player of the Match:
Riley Norton (South Africa)

Assistant referees:
Griffin Colby (South Africa)
Hanru van Rooyen (South Africa)
Television match official:
Marius van der Westhuizen (South Africa)
Foul play review officer:
Marius Jonker (South Africa)

27 June 2026
19:05 JST (UTC+9)

Japan XV	31–38	Māori All Blacks
Try: Ueda 8' c Harada 33' m Riley 36' c Burua 39' m Matsunaga 53' c Con: Matsunaga (3/5) 8', 37', 54'	Report	Try: Lennox 14' c Sullivan 49' c Howden 63' c Nock 67' c Kemara 75' m Taele 79' m Con: Reihana (2/2) 15', 50'; Kemara (2/4) 64', 69'

Paloma Mizuho Stadium, Nagoya
Attendance: 23,165
Referee: Sam Grove-White (Scotland)

Team details

FB	15	Takurō Matsunaga
RW	14	Kazuma Ueda
OC	13	Dylan Riley	(substituted off) 69'
IC	12	Jisu Lee	(substituted off) 60'
LW	11	Inoke Burua
FH	10	Ryūnosuke Itō
SH	9	Takuro Hojo	(substituted off) 40'
N8	8	Waisake Raratubua	(substituted off) 34'	(substituted on) 50'	(substituted off) 49'
OF	7	Tiennan Costley	(substituted off) 66'
BF	6	Kanji Shimokawa
RL	5	Michael Stolberg
LL	4	Esei Ha'angana
TP	3	Shuhei Takeuchi	(substituted off) 72'
HK	2	Mamoru Harada (c)	(substituted off) 61'
LP	1	Takato Okabe	(substituted off) 40'
Replacements:
HK	16	Kenji Sato	(substituted on) 61'
PR	17	Sojiro Otsuka	(substituted on) 40'
PR	18	Izi Sword	(substituted on) 72'
LK	19	Shin Takeuchi	(substituted on) 66'
BR	20	Aseri Masivou	(substituted on) 34'	(substituted off) 50'	(substituted on) 49'
SH	21	Haruto Watanabe	(substituted on) 40'
FH	22	Sam Greene	(substituted on) 69'
CE	23	Taira Main	(substituted on) 60'
Coach:
(England) Neal Hatley

FB	15	Cole Forbes
RW	14	Payton Spencer		(substituted off) 71'
OC	13	Bailyn Sullivan (c)	(yellow card) 31'
IC	12	Xavi Taele
LW	11	Reon Paul		(substituted off) 39'
FH	10	Rivez Reihana
SH	9	Adam Lennox		(substituted off) 50'
N8	8	Torian Barnes	(yellow card) 32'
OF	7	Jahrome Brown		(substituted off) 50'
BF	6	TK Howden
RL	5	Tahlor Cahill
LL	4	Laghlan McWhannell		(substituted off) 50'
TP	3	Marcel Renata		(substituted off) 53'
HK	2	Tyrone Thompson		(substituted off) 53'
LP	1	Ollie Norris		(substituted off) 53'
Replacements:
HK	16	Jacob Devery		(substituted on) 53'
PR	17	Pouri Rakete-Stones		(substituted on) 53'
PR	18	Benet Kumeroa		(substituted on) 53'
LK	19	Caleb Delany		(substituted on) 50'
BR	20	Nikora Broughton		(substituted on) 50'
SH	21	Sam Nock		(substituted on) 39'
FH	22	Taha Kemara		(substituted on) 50'
WG	23	Kyle Brown		(substituted on) 71'
Coach:
(New Zealand) Tamati Ellison

Assistant referees:
Katsuki Furuse (Japan)
Ibuki Tetsuka (Japan)
Television match official:
Koki Yamauchi (Japan)

27 June 2026
14:00 BST (UTC+1)

Barbarians	31–33	Wales
Try: Koch 8' m North (2) 48' m, 70' c Nankivell 60' c Arata 80+3'; Con: Plummer (2) 60', 71'; North 80+4'	Report	Try: Hardy 4' c D. Edwards (2) 23', 45'; Morgan-Williams 56'; Mee 67'; Con: D. Edwards (2) 4', 24'; Costelow (2) 56', 68'

Twickenham Stadium, London
Attendance: 20,000
Referee: Anthony Woodthorpe (England)

Team details

FB	15	(France) Tom Spring
RW	14	(Australia) Andrew Kellaway	(substituted off) 47'
OC	13	(South Africa) Jeremy Ward
IC	12	(New Zealand) Alex Nankivell
LW	11	(France) Virimi Vakatawa
FH	10	(New Zealand) Harry Plummer
SH	9	(South Africa) Faf de Klerk (c)	(substituted off) 47'
N8	8	(England) Nathan Hughes	(substituted off) 55'
OF	7	(New Zealand) Lachlan Boshier
BF	6	(Australia) Lukhan Salakaia-Loto
RL	5	(France) Romain Taofifénua	(substituted off) 61'
LL	4	(Australia) Izack Rodda	(substituted off) 50'
TP	3	(South Africa) Vincent Koch	(substituted off) 47'
HK	2	(Wales) Elliot Dee	(substituted off) 55'
LP	1	(Georgia (country)) Giorgi Kharaishvili	(substituted off) 26'
Replacements:
HK	16	(England) Harry Thacker	(substituted on) 55'
PR	17	(United States) Jack Iscaro	(substituted on) 26'
PR	18	(Samoa) Paul Alo-Emile	(substituted on) 47'
LK	19	(France) Yoan Tanga	(substituted on) 50'
BR	20	(France) Jordan Joseph	(substituted on) 55'
SH	21	(Uruguay) Santiago Arata	(substituted on) 47'
WG	22	(Wales) George North	(substituted on) 47'
BR	23	(Scotland) Liam McConnell	(substituted on) 61'
Coach:
(New Zealand) Scott Robertson

FB	15	Blair Murray
RW	14	Tom Rogers		(substituted off) 77'
OC	13	Eddie James	(substituted off) 52'
IC	12	Joe Hawkins
LW	11	Ellis Mee
FH	10	Dan Edwards	(substituted off) 52'	(substituted on) 77'
SH	9	Kieran Hardy	(substituted off) 50'
N8	8	Aaron Wainwright	(substituted off) 52'
OF	7	Jac Morgan
BF	6	Taine Plumtree
RL	5	Teddy Williams	(substituted off) 58'
LL	4	Ben Carter
TP	3	Dillon Lewis	(substituted off) 40'
HK	2	Dewi Lake (c)	(substituted off) 40'
LP	1	Gareth Thomas	(substituted off) 40'
Replacements:
HK	16	Ryan Elias	(substituted on) 40'
PR	17	Rhys Barratt	(substituted on) 40'
PR	18	Ben Warren	(substituted on) 40'
BR	19	Ryan Woodman	(substituted on) 58'
BR	20	Harrison Keddie	(substituted on) 52'
SH	21	Reuben Morgan-Williams	(substituted on) 50'
FH	22	Sam Costelow	(substituted on) 52'
CE	23	Mason Grady	(substituted on) 52'
Coach:
(Wales) Steve Tandy

Player of the Match:
Aaron Wainwright (Wales)

Assistant referees:
Alex Thomas (England)
Jamie Parr (England)
Television match official:
Stuart Terheege (England)

27 June 2026
14:00 CLT (UTC−4)

Chile XV	14–47	Samoa XV
Try: Alvano 10' c Reyes 42' c Con: Reyes (2/2) 11', 43'	Report	Try: Faiʻilagi 5' c Paia'aua 17' c Tuivaiti 25' c Umaga-Jensen 29' m Pomale-Time 38' c Lam 49' c Mapu 55' c Con: Alatimu (6/7) 6', 18', 26', 39', 50', 56'

Saint George's College, Santiago
Referee: Raimundo Fuenzalida (Chile)

28 June 2026
15:00 CAT (UTC+02)

Namibia	71–12	Zambia
	Report

Hage Geingob Rugby Stadium, Windhoek
Referee: Johre Botha (Namibia)

== July ==
5 July 2026
15:00 CLT (UTC−4)

Chile XV	52–19	Paraguay
	Report

Centro de Alto Rendimiento del Rugby (CARR), La Reina

10 July 2026
15:00 CLT (UTC−4)

Chile XV	24–43	Paraguay

Centro de Alto Rendimiento del Rugby (CARR), La Reina

11 July 2026
15:00 CAT (UTC+02)

Namibia	47–50	(South Africa) Blue Bulls
	Report

Hage Geingob Rugby Stadium, Windhoek

25 July 2026
15:00 BST (UTC+1)

Channel Islands RFC	38–27	Poland
	Report

CoinShares Park, St Peter, Jersey

== August ==
8 August 2026
19:05 JST (UTC+9)

Japan	32–35	Australia
Try: Itō 12' c Makisi 34' c Ueda 45' m Dearns 78' c Con: Matsunaga (3/4) 13', 35', 79'; Pen: Matsunaga (2/2) 53', 59'	Report	Try: Potter 15' c Wright 26' c Jorgensen 42' c McReight 49' c Tupou 70' m Con: Lonergan (4/4) 16', 27', 43', 50'; Donaldson (1/1) 71'

Hanazono Rugby Stadium, Higashiosaka
Attendance: 21,322
Referee: Eoghan Cross (Ireland)

Team details

FB	15	Takurō Matsunaga
RW	14	Kazuma Ueda
OC	13	Dylan Riley	(substituted off) 66'
IC	12	Samisoni Tua
LW	11	Taira Main	(substituted off) 57'
FH	10	Ryūnosuke Itō
SH	9	Naoto Saitō
N8	8	Faulua Makisi	(substituted off) 63'
OF	7	Kanji Shimokawa	(substituted off) 60'
BF	6	Ben Gunter
RL	5	Warner Dearns (c)
LL	4	Jack Cornelsen	(substituted off) 65'
TP	3	Shuhei Takeuchi	(substituted off) 66'
HK	2	Hayate Era	(substituted off) 56'
LP	1	Takato Okabe	(substituted off) 63'
Substitutions:
PR	16	Mamoru Harada	(substituted on) 57'
HK	17	Sojiro Otsuka	(substituted on) 63'
PR	18	Keijiro Tamefusa	(substituted on) 66'
LK	19	Harry Hockings	(substituted on) 65'
BR	20	Michael Leitch	(substituted on) 60'
BR	21	Tiennan Costley	(substituted on) 63'
FB	22	Shunsuke Uenobo	(substituted on) 66'
FB	23	Yoshitaka Yazaki	(substituted on) 56'
Coach:
Eddie Jones

FB	15	Tom Wright		(substituted off) 72'
RW	14	Max Jorgensen
OC	13	Joseph Sua'ali'i
IC	12	Hunter Paisami
LW	11	Harry Potter		(substituted off) 63'
FH	10	Declan Meredith
SH	9	Ryan Lonergan		(substituted off) 63'
N8	8	Harry Wilson (c)
OF	7	Fraser McReight
BF	6	Rob Valetini		(substituted off) 63'
RL	5	Miles Amatosero	(red card) 32'
LL	4	Josh Canham
TP	3	Allan Alaalatoa		(substituted off) 54'
HK	2	Josh Nasser		(substituted off) 54'
LP	1	Aidan Ross		(substituted off) 40'
Substitutions:
HK	16	Billy Pollard		(substituted on) 54'
PR	17	Angus Bell		(substituted on) 40'
PR	18	Taniela Tupou		(substituted on) 54'
LK	19	Jeremy Williams		(substituted on) 54'
BR	20	Charlie Cale		(substituted on) 63'
SH	21	Tate McDermott		(substituted on) 63'
FH	22	Ben Donaldson		(substituted on) 63'
CE	23	Isaac Henry		(substituted on) 72'
Coach:
Les Kiss

Assistant referees:
Paul Williams (New Zealand)
Morgan White (Hong Kong China)
Television match official:
Richard Kelly (New Zealand)
Foul play review officer:
Matt Rodden (Hong Kong China)

Notes:

- Isaac Henry (Australia) made his international debut.
- Japan's 32 points was the most they had scored against Australia in a test match, surpassing their previous record of 30 set in 2017.

8 August 2026
16:00 ART (UTC-03)

Argentina	10–17	South Africa
Try: Grondona 8' c Con: Carreras (1/1) 9'; Pen: Carreras (1/2) 2'	Report	Try: van der Merwe 39' c Hanekom 62' c Con: Feinberg-Mngomezulu (1/1) 40', Pollard (1/1) 63'; Pen: Feinberg-Mngomezulu (1/1) 6'

José Amalfitani Stadium, Buenos Aires
Referee: Christophe Ridley (England)

Team details

FB	15	Gerónimo Prisciantelli
RW	14	Rodrigo Isgró
OC	13	Lucio Cinti
IC	12	Faustino Sánchez Valarolo
LW	11	Ignacio Mendy	(substituted off) 56'
FH	10	Santiago Carreras
SH	9	Simon Benitez Cruz	(substituted off) 34'	(substituted on) 40'	(substituted off) 56'
N8	8	Joaquín Moro	(substituted off) 65'
OF	7	Benjamín Grondona	(substituted off) 49'
BF	6	Pablo Matera (c)
RL	5	Tomás Lavanini	(substituted off) 43'
LL	4	Guido Petti
TP	3	Francisco Moreno	(substituted off) 40'
HK	2	Ignacio Ruiz	(substituted off) 65'
LP	1	Boris Wenger	(substituted off) 56'
Substitutions:
HK	16	Leonel Oviedo	(substituted on) 65'
PR	17	Mayco Vivas	(substituted on) 56'
PR	18	Tomas Rapetti	(substituted on) 40'
LK	19	Efraín Elías	(substituted on) 43'
BR	20	Juan Penoucos	(substituted on) 49'
BR	21	Juan Martín Scelzo	(substituted on) 65'
SH	22	Agustín Moyano	(substituted on) 34'	(substituted off) 40'	(substituted on) 56'
CE	23	Matías Moroni	(substituted on) 56'
Coach:
Felipe Contepomi

FB	15	Aphelele Fassi	(substituted off) 59'	(substituted on) 65'
RW	14	Edwill van der Merwe
OC	13	Canan Moodie
IC	12	André Esterhuizen		(substituted off) 65'
LW	11	Ethan Hooker
FH	10	Sacha Feinberg-Mngomezulu
SH	9	Cobus Reinach	(substituted off) 59'
N8	8	Cameron Hanekom		(substituted off) 77'
BF	7	Elrigh Louw	(substituted off) 49'	(substituted on) 77'
OF	6	Siya Kolisi (c)	(substituted off) 24'
RL	5	Lood de Jager	(substituted off) 49'
LL	4	Eben Etzebeth
TP	3	Thomas du Toit	(substituted off) 49'
HK	2	Johan Grobbelaar	(substituted off) 62'
LP	1	Boan Venter	(substituted off) 49'
Substitutions:
HK	16	Jan-Hendrik Wessels	(substituted on) 62'
PR	17	Gerhard Steenekamp	(substituted on) 49'
PR	18	Zach Porthen	(substituted on) 49'
BR	19	Ben-Jason Dixon	(substituted on) 49'
BR	20	Cobus Wiese	(substituted on) 49'
BR	21	Marco van Staden	(substituted on) 24'
SH	22	Morné van den Berg	(substituted on) 59'
FH	23	Handré Pollard	(substituted on) 59'
Coach:
Rassie Erasmus

Assistant referees:
Luc Ramos (France)
Craig Evans (Wales)
Television match official:
Ben Whitehouse (Wales)
Foul play review officer:
Ian Tempest (England)

Notes:

- Francisco Moreno, Leonel Oviedo, Juan Penoucos and Juan Martín Scelzo (all Argentina) made their international debuts.

15 August 2026
15:00 AEST (UTC+10)

Australia	56–17	Japan
Try: Nasser 7' c Tupou (2) 17' c, 39' c Bell 51' c de Lutiis 58' c Cale 73' c Wilson 75' c Paenga-Amosa 81' c Con: Lonergan (5/5) 8', 18', 40', 52', 60'; Donaldson (3/3) 74', 76', 82'	Report	Try: Hockings 5' m Saitō 26' c Riley 34' m Con: Matsunaga (1/3) 27'

North Queensland Stadium, Townsville
Attendance: 18,076
Referee: Paul Williams (New Zealand)

Team details

FB	15	Tom Wright
RW	14	Max Jorgensen	(substituted off) 66'
OC	13	Hunter Paisami
IC	12	Isaac Henry
LW	11	Harry Potter
FH	10	Carter Gordon	(substituted off) 60'
SH	9	Ryan Lonergan	(substituted off) 60'
N8	8	Harry Wilson (c)
OF	7	Carlo Tizzano
BF	6	Charlie Cale
RL	5	Lukhan Salakaia-Loto	(substituted off) 50'
LL	4	Lachlan Shaw	(substituted off) 69'
TP	3	Taniela Tupou	(substituted off) 50'
HK	2	Josh Nasser	(substituted off) 41'
LP	1	Angus Bell	(substituted off) 60'
Substitutions:
HK	16	Brandon Paenga-Amosa	(substituted on) 41'
PR	17	Aidan Ross	(substituted on) 60'
PR	18	Massimo de Lutiis	(substituted on) 50'
LK	19	Jeremy Williams	(substituted on) 50'
BR	20	Fraser McReight	(substituted on) 69'
SH	21	Tate McDermott	(substituted on) 60'
FH	22	Ben Donaldson	(substituted on) 60'
CE	23	Filipo Daugunu	(substituted on) 66'
Coach:
(Australia) Les Kiss

FB	15	Takurō Matsunaga
RW	14	Yoshitaka Yazaki
OC	13	Dylan Riley
IC	12	Shunsuke Uenobo
LW	11	Haruto Kida		(substituted off) 41'
FH	10	Ryūnosuke Itō
SH	9	Naoto Saitō		(substituted off) 71'
N8	8	Faulua Makisi		(substituted off) 59'
OF	7	Tiennan Costley		(substituted off) 50'
BF	6	Ben Gunter			(substituted off) 77'
RL	5	Warner Dearns (c)
LL	4	Harry Hockings
TP	3	Shuhei Takeuchi		(substituted off) 68'
HK	2	Hayate Era		(substituted off) 59'	(substituted on) 77'
LP	1	Takato Okabe		(substituted off) 50'
Substitutions:
HK	16	Mamoru Harada	(yellow card) 76'	(substituted on) 59'
PR	17	Sojiro Otsuka		(substituted on) 50'
PR	18	Izi Sword		(substituted on) 68'
LK	19	Jack Cornelsen		(substituted on) 59'
BR	20	Michael Leitch		(substituted on) 50'
SH	21	Itsuki Kamimura		(substituted on) 71'
FH	22	Samisoni Tua			(substituted on) 71'
WG	23	Kazuma Ueda		(substituted on) 41'	(substituted off) 71'
Coach:
(Australia) Eddie Jones

Assistant referees:
Angus Mabey (New Zealand)
Marcus Playle (New Zealand)
Television match official:
Glenn Newman (New Zealand)
Foul play review officer:
Richard Kelly (New Zealand)

Notes:

- Massimo de Lutiis (Australia) made his international debut, becoming the 1000th player for the Wallabies.

15 August 2026
19:30 EDT (UTC-04)

United States XV	25–24	Argentina XV
Try: Klein 22' m Alikhan 34' c Redelinghuys 62' c Con: Carty (2/3) 35', 63'; Pen: Carty (2/2) 4', 53'	Report	Try: Vaca 9' m Viola 30' m Rossetto 40' c Sbrocco 71' c Con: Dogliani (2/4) 40', 72'

Inter Miami CF Stadium, Fort Lauderdale
Referee: Jeremy Rozier (France)

Team details

FB	15	Julian Roberts
RW	14	Mark O'Keeffe		(substituted off) 44'
OC	13	Tavite Lopeti
IC	12	Dominic Besag
LW	11	Joe Mano
FH	10	Luke Carty
SH	9	Ruben de Haas		(substituted off) 67'
N8	8	Makeen Alikhan	(yellow card) 40'	(substituted off) 77'
OF	7	Paddy Ryan
BF	6	Marno Redelinghuys
RL	5	Nathan Den Hoedt		(substituted off) 47'
LL	4	Jason Damm (c)		(substituted off) 67'
TP	3	Charlie Abel		(substituted off) 67'
HK	2	Shilo Klein		(substituted off) 51'
LP	1	Payton Telea-Ilalio		(substituted off) 43'
Substitutions:
PR	16	Alex Maughan		(substituted on) 51'
PR	17	Fakaʻosi Pifeleti		(substituted on) 43'
PR	18	Ma'ake Muti		(substituted on) 67'
LK	19	Tevita Naqali		(substituted on) 67'
LK	20	Brandon Harvey		(substituted on) 47'
BR	21	Lance Williams		(substituted on) 77'
SH	22	Ethan McVeigh		(substituted on) 67'
FH	23	Davy Coetzer		(substituted on) 44'
Coach:
Scott Lawrence

FB	15	Franco Rossetto		(substituted off) 74'
RW	14	Bautista Lescano
OC	13	Tomás Elizalde		(substituted off) 37'
IC	12	Bautista Estelles
LW	11	Mateo Pasquini
FH	10	Ignacio Dogliani
SH	9	Nicolás Viola		(substituted off) 61'
N8	8	Thiago Sbrocco
OF	7	Agustín Sarelli		(substituted off) 57'
BF	6	Nicolás D'Amorim (c)
RL	5	Francisco Sluga	(yellow card) 47'	(substituted off) 61'
LL	4	Rodrigo Fernández Criado
TP	3	Marcos Camerlinckx		(substituted off) 48'
HK	2	Martín Vaca		(substituted off) 57'
LP	1	Nicolás Revol Pitt		(substituted off) 48'
Substitutions:
HK	16	Juan Greising Revol		(substituted on) 57'
PR	17	Diego Correa		(substituted on) 48'
PR	18	Enzo Avaca		(substituted on) 48'
LK	19	Joaquín Domínguez		(substituted on) 61'
BR	20	Felipe Villagrán		(substituted on) 57'
SH	21	Alejo Sugasti		(substituted on) 61'
FH	22	Federico Serpa		(substituted on) 74'
CE	23	Facundo Pueyrredón		(substituted on) 37'
Coach:
Álvaro Galindo

Assistant referees:
Robin Kaluzniak (Canada)
Pete Pender (Canada)
Television match official:
Cam Russell (Canada)

22 August 2026
17:10 SAST (UTC+2)

South Africa	16–33	New Zealand
Try: Esterhuizen 13' c Con: Kolbe (1/1) 14'; Pen: Kolbe (3/3) 4', 26', 46'	Report	Try: Jordan (2) 8' m, 74' c Moorby 22' c Holland 47' c Jacobson 58' c Con: Love (4/5) 23', 48', 59', 75'

Ellis Park Stadium, Johannesburg
Attendance: 60,592
Referee: Matthew Carley (England)

Team details

FB	15	Damian Willemse
RW	14	Cheslin Kolbe		(substituted off) 58'
OC	13	Jesse Kriel
IC	12	Damian de Allende
LW	11	Kurt-Lee Arendse		(substituted off) 9'
FH	10	Sacha Feinberg-Mngomezulu
SH	9	Grant Williams
N8	8	Jasper Wiese
OF	7	Pieter-Steph du Toit (c)
BF	6	Paul de Villiers		(substituted off) 61'
RL	5	Ruan Nortjé
LL	4	Eben Etzebeth		(substituted off) 73'
TP	3	Wilco Louw		(substituted off) 60'
HK	2	Malcolm Marx
LP	1	Ox Nché		(substituted off) 45'
Substitutions:
HK	16	Jan-Hendrik Wessels			(substituted on) 66'
PR	17	Gerhard Steenekamp		(substituted on) 45'	(substituted off) 66'
PR	18	Zachary Porthen		(substituted on) 60'
BR	19	Cobus Wiese		(substituted on) 73'
CE	20	André Esterhuizen		(substituted on) 9'	(substituted off) 62'
BR	21	Marco van Staden	(yellow card) 68'	(substituted on) 61'
SH	22	Cobus Reinach	(yellow card) 70'	(substituted on) 58'
FH	23	Manie Libbok			(substituted on) 62'
Coach:
Rassie Erasmus

FB	15	Damian McKenzie
RW	14	Will Jordan
OC	13	Quinn Tupaea	(substituted off) 75'
IC	12	Jordie Barrett
LW	11	Josh Moorby	(substituted off) 63'
FH	10	Ruben Love
SH	9	Cam Roigard	(substituted off) 75'
N8	8	Ardie Savea (c)
OF	7	Luke Jacobson	(substituted off) 75'
BF	6	Tupou Vaa'i
RL	5	Fabian Holland
LL	4	Josh Lord	(substituted off) 37'
TP	3	Tyrel Lomax	(substituted off) 50'
HK	2	Codie Taylor	(substituted off) 54'
LP	1	Ethan de Groot	(substituted off) 37'
Substitutions:
HK	16	Asafo Aumua	(substituted on) 54'
PR	17	George Bower	(substituted on) 37'
PR	18	Fletcher Newell	(substituted on) 50'
BR	19	Simon Parker	(substituted on) 37'
BR	20	Peter Lakai	(substituted on) 75'
SH	21	Kyle Preston	(substituted on) 75'
CE	22	Anton Lienert-Brown	(substituted on) 75'
WG	23	Leroy Carter	(substituted on) 63'
Coach:
Dave Rennie

Player of the Match:
Will Jordan (New Zealand)

Assistant referees:
Karl Dickson (England)
Nika Amashukeli (Georgia)
Television match official:
Mike Adamson (Scotland)
Foul play review officer:
Eric Gauzins (France)

Notes:

- Damian de Allende became the tenth Springbok player to earn 100 test caps.

29 August 2026
17:10 SAST (UTC+2)

South Africa	33–26	New Zealand
Try: Kriel 2' c de Allende 22' c Kolisi 38' c Con: Kolbe (3/3) 3', 23', 39'; Pen: Kolbe (4/4) 19', 49', 51', 72'	Report	Try: Roigard 9' c McKenzie 30' c Carter 66' m Savea 77' c Con: Love (3/4) 17', 31', 78'

Cape Town Stadium, Cape Town
Attendance: 56,589
Referee: Angus Gardner (Australia)

Team details

FB	15	Damian Willemse		(substituted off) 40'
RW	14	Cheslin Kolbe
OC	13	Jesse Kriel
IC	12	Damian de Allende
LW	11	Ethan Hooker
FH	10	Sacha Feinberg-Mngomezulu
SH	9	Cobus Reinach		(substituted off) 57'
N8	8	Jasper Wiese		(substituted off) 68'
BF	7	Pieter-Steph du Toit
OF	6	Siya Kolisi (c)		(substituted off) 43'
RL	5	Ruan Nortjé		(substituted off) 68'
LL	4	Eben Etzebeth
TP	3	Thomas du Toit		(substituted off) 57'
HK	2	Deon Fourie		(substituted off) 36'
LP	1	Gerhard Steenekamp		(substituted off) 36'
Substitutions:
HK	16	Malcolm Marx		(substituted on) 36'
PR	17	Ox Nché		(substituted on) 36'
PR	18	Wilco Louw		(substituted on) 57'
BR	19	Lood de Jager	(yellow card) 80'	(substituted on) 68'
CE	20	André Esterhuizen		(substituted on) 43'
BR	21	Cameron Hanekom		(substituted on) 68'
SH	22	Morné van den Berg		(substituted on) 57'
FH	23	Manie Libbok		(substituted on) 40'
Coach:
Rassie Erasmus

FB	15	Damian McKenzie
RW	14	Will Jordan
OC	13	Quinn Tupaea	(substituted off) 68'
IC	12	Jordie Barrett
LW	11	Leroy Carter
FH	10	Ruben Love
SH	9	Cam Roigard	(substituted off) 72'
N8	8	Ardie Savea (c)
OF	7	Luke Jacobson	(substituted off) 63'
BF	6	Simon Parker	(substituted off) 52'
RL	5	Tupou Vaa'i
LL	4	Fabian Holland
TP	3	Tyrel Lomax	(substituted off) 49'
HK	2	Codie Taylor	(substituted off) 49'
LP	1	George Bower	(substituted off) 54'
Substitutions:
HK	16	Asafo Aumua	(substituted on) 49'
PR	17	Xavier Numia	(substituted on) 54'
PR	18	Fletcher Newell	(substituted on) 49'
LK	19	Patrick Tuipulotu	(substituted on) 63'
BR	20	Peter Lakai	(substituted on) 52'
SH	21	Kyle Preston	(substituted on) 72'
CE	22	Anton Lienert-Brown	(substituted on) 68'
WG	23	Josh Moorby
Coach:
Dave Rennie

Player of the Match: Cheslin Kolbe (South Africa)

Assistant referees:
Karl Dickson (England)
Sam Grove-White (Scotland)
Television match official:
Brett Cronan (Australia)
Foul play review officer:
Eric Gauzins (France)

Notes:

- Pieter-Steph du Toit become the eleventh Springbok to earn 100 test caps.
- Ox Nché (South Africa) earned his 50th test cap.

29 August 2026
16:00 ART (UTC–03)

Argentina	21–27	Australia
Try: Prisciantelli 13' c Moro 36' c Wenger 51' c Con: Carreras (3/3) 14', 37', 51'	Report	Try: Paenga-Amosa 6' m Gordon 10' c McReight 19' c Hooper 54' m Con: Lonergan (2/3) 11', 20'; Pen: Lonergan (1/1) 40+1'

Estadio 23 de Agosto, San Salvador de Jujuy
Attendance: 25,000
Referee: Ben O'Keeffe (New Zealand)

Team details

FB	15	Gerónimo Prisciantelli	(substituted off) 67'
RW	14	Rodrigo Isgró
OC	13	Lucio Cinti
IC	12	Faustino Sánchez Valarolo	(substituted off) 61'
LW	11	Ignacio Mendy
FH	10	Santiago Carreras
SH	9	Simón Benítez Cruz	(substituted off) 61'
N8	8	Joaquín Moro
BF	7	Benjamín Grondona	(substituted off) 55'
OF	6	Pablo Matera (c)
RL	5	Tomás Lavanini	(substituted off) 40'
LL	4	Guido Petti
TP	3	Francisco Moreno	(substituted off) 47'
HK	2	Ignacio Ruiz	(substituted off) 67'
LP	1	Boris Wenger	(substituted off) 55'
Substitutions:
HK	16	Leonel Oviedo	(substituted on) 67'
PR	17	Rodrigo Martínez	(substituted on) 55'
PR	18	Tomas Rapetti	(substituted on) 47'
LK	19	Efraín Elías	(substituted on) 40'
BR	20	Juan Penoucos	(substituted on) 55'
SH	21	Agustín Moyano	(substituted on) 61'
FH	22	Nicolás Roger	(substituted on) 67'
CE	23	Matías Moroni	(substituted on) 61'
Coach:
(Argentina) Felipe Contepomi

FB	15	Tom Wright
RW	14	Max Jorgensen
OC	13	Isaac Henry		(substituted off) 65'
IC	12	Hunter Paisami
LW	11	Harry Potter	(yellow card) 24'
FH	10	Carter Gordon		(substituted off) 54'	(substituted on) 64'
SH	9	Ryan Lonergan		(substituted off) 44'
N8	8	Rob Valetini		(substituted off) 71'
OF	7	Fraser McReight
BF	6	Tom Hooper
RL	5	Jeremy Williams
LL	4	Josh Canham		(substituted off) 59'
TP	3	Allan Alaalatoa (c)		(substituted off) 50'
HK	2	Brandon Paenga-Amosa		(substituted off) 50'
LP	1	Isaac Aedo Kailea		(substituted off) 40'
Substitutions:
HK	16	Billy Pollard		(substituted on) 50'
PR	17	Angus Bell		(substituted on) 40'
PR	18	Massimo de Lutiis		(substituted on) 50'
LK	19	Lachlan Shaw		(substituted on) 59'
BR	20	Charlie Cale		(substituted on) 71'
SH	21	Tate McDermott		(substituted on) 44'
FH	22	Ben Donaldson		(substituted on) 54'	(substituted off) 64'
CE	23	Joseph-Aukuso Sua'ali'i		(substituted on) 65'
Coach:
(Australia) Les Kiss

Player of the Match:
Fraser McReight (Australia)

Assistant referees:
James Doleman (New Zealand)
Gianluca Gnecchi (Italy)
Television match official:
Richard Kelly (New Zealand)
Foul play review officer:
Glenn Newman (New Zealand)

29 August 2026
17:00 BRT (UTC-3)

Brazil	35–62	Classic All Blacks

Pacaembu Stadium, São Paulo

== September ==
4 September 2026
15:00 TST (UTC+13)

Tonga President's XV	19–43	First Nations & Pasifika XV
	Report

Teufaiva Sport Stadium, Nuku'alofa

Team details

FB	15	Maama-He-Lotu Tonga
RW	14	William Helu
OC	13	Netaleni Taufateau
IC	12	Leonaitasi Feke
LW	11	Filipe Tongamoa
FH	10	Linley Savieti
SH	9	Feleti Inoke
N8	8	Sione 'Ofa
OF	7	Peau Hingano
BF	6	Mafile'o Finau
RL	5	Apolosi Fine
LL	4	Vutulongo Puloka (c)
TP	3	Unaloto Taulava
HK	2	Mosese Havea
LP	1	Isao Fononga
Substitutions:
HK	16	Heneli Bloomfield
PR	17	Tausinga Taefateau
PR	18	Penisimani Pifeleti
LK	19	Peni Tafea
BR	20	Lamipeti Havea
SH	21	Lemisio Moala
FH	22	Samiuela Tauimeapi
CE	23	Poasi Ika
Coach:
Benhur Kivalu

FB	15	BJ Oates
RW	14	Angus Tagicakibau
OC	13	Triston Reilly (c)
IC	12	Jarrah McLeod
LW	11	Gage Phillips
FH	10	Chace Oates
SH	9	Moses Sorovi
N8	8	Judah Saumaisue
OF	7	Davea Teoteo
BF	6	Tau Tuisamoa
RL	5	Sau Vaihu
LL	4	Tavita Loughland
TP	3	Remsy Lemisio
HK	2	John Grenfell
LP	1	Lington Ieli
Substitutions:
HK	16	Oniti Finau
PR	17	Berakah Tuifaasisina
PR	18	Fred Kaihea
LK	19	Malakai Taulani
BR	20	Taufa Kinikini
SH	21	Teina Graham
FH	22	Tamarangi Tunui
CE	23	Garlen Peace
Coach:
Wycliff Palu

5 September 2026
14:50 JST (UTC+9)

Japan	57–12	Canada
Try: Okabe 5' m Harada (2) 15' c, 41' c Gunter 22' m Hirose 27' c Shimokawa 41' c Hockings 59' m Inaba 77' c Costley 80' c Con: Matsunaga (4/6) 16', 27', 42', 42'; Greene (2/3) 78', 82'	Report	Try: McMullin 19' c LeSage 60' m Con: McMullin (1/2) 20'

Denka Big Swan Stadium, Niigata
Attendance: 18,045
Referee: Morgan White (Hong Kong China)

Team details

FB	15	Takurō Matsunaga	(substituted off) 56'
RW	14	Inoke Burua
OC	13	Dylan Riley
IC	12	Yūya Hirose
LW	11	Haruto Kida
FH	10	Ryūnosuke Itō
SH	9	Naoto Saitō	(substituted off) 61'
N8	8	Faulua Makisi	(substituted off) 51'
OF	7	Kanji Shimokawa
BF	6	Ben Gunter	(substituted off) 61'
RL	5	Harry Hockings	(substituted off) 61'
LL	4	Jack Cornelsen
TP	3	Shuhei Takeuchi	(substituted off) 48'
HK	2	Mamoru Harada	(substituted off) 48'
LP	1	Tokato Okabe	(substituted off) 48'
Substitutions:
HK	16	Kenji Sato	(substituted on) 48'
PR	17	Sojiro Otsuka	(substituted on) 48'
PR	18	Takumi Inaba	(substituted on) 48'
LK	19	Michael Stolberg	(substituted on) 61'
BR	20	Esei Haangana	(substituted on) 61'
SH	21	Tiennan Costley	(substituted on) 51'
FH	22	Kenta Fukuda	(substituted on) 61'
CE	23	Sam Greene	(substituted on) 56'
Coach:
Eddie Jones

FB	15	Takoda McMullin
RW	14	Kyle Tremblay	(substituted off) 76'
OC	13	Isaac Olson
IC	12	Ben LeSage
LW	11	Liam James	(substituted off) 51'
FH	10	Cooper Coats
SH	9	Jesse Kilgour	(substituted off) 58'
N8	8	Lucas Rumball (c)
OF	7	Siôn Parry
BF	6	Mason Flesch
RL	5	Izzak Kelly	(substituted off) 64'
LL	4	Daragh Doyle	(substituted off) 75'
TP	3	Kyle Steeves	(substituted off) 64'
HK	2	Foster DeWitt	(substituted off) 49'
LP	1	Sam Miller	(substituted off) 51'
Substitutions:
HK	16	Dewald Kotze	(substituted on) 49'
PR	17	Emerson Prior	(substituted on) 51'
PR	18	Bryce Worden	(substituted on) 64'
LK	19	Barnaby Waddell	(substituted on) 64'
BR	20	Cody Nhanala	(substituted on) 75'
SH	21	Jason Higgins	(substituted on) 58'
FH	22	Spencer Jones	(substituted on) 76'
CE	23	Jamie Armstrong	(substituted on) 51'
Coach:
Steve Meehan

Assistant referees:
Jordan Way (Australia)
Francesco Cammisa (Hong Kong China)
Television match official:
Matt Rodden (Hong Kong China)

Notes:

- Takumi Inaba, Inoke Burua (both Japan), Bryce Worden, and Jamie Armstrong (both Canada) all made their international test debut.
- This was Japan's centenary test, celebrating 100 years since the formation of the Japan Rugby Football Union (JRFU).
- Japan's 57 points was the most they had scored against Canada, equaling their previous record achieved in 2025. It was also the largest victory (by margin) Japan had recorded against Canada.

5 September 2026
17:10 SAST (UTC+2)

South Africa	29–24	New Zealand
Try: Arendse 20' m Penalty try 36'; Kriel 57' c Marx 65' c Con: Feinberg-Mngomezulu (2/3) 58', 66'; Pen: Feinberg-Mngomezulu (1/1) 70'	Report	Try: Savea (2) 5' c, 25' m Jordan 55' m Taukei'aho 80+1' c Con: Love (1/3) 11'; McKenzie (1/1) 80+2'

FNB Stadium, Johannesburg
Attendance: 85,967
Referee: Nika Amashukeli (Georgia)

Team details

FB	15	Cheslin Kolbe		(substituted off) 10'
RW	14	Kurt-Lee Arendse
OC	13	Jesse Kriel
IC	12	Damian de Allende
LW	11	Ethan Hooker
FH	10	Sacha Feinberg-Mngomezulu	(yellow card) 10'
SH	9	Cobus Reinach		(substituted off) 43'
N8	8	Jasper Wiese		(substituted off) 62'
BF	7	Pieter-Steph du Toit
OF	6	Siya Kolisi (c)		(substituted off) 57'
RL	5	Ruan Nortjé
LL	4	Eben Etzebeth		(substituted off) 57'
TP	3	Wilco Louw		(substituted off) 51'
HK	2	Malcolm Marx		(substituted off) 68'
LP	1	Ox Nché		(substituted off) 57'
Substitutions:
HK	16	Deon Fourie		(substituted on) 57'
PR	17	Gerhard Steenekamp		(substituted on) 57'
PR	18	Thomas du Toit		(substituted on) 51'
BR	19	Lood de Jager		(substituted on) 57'
CE	20	André Esterhuizen		(substituted on) 68'
BR	21	Cameron Hanekom		(substituted on) 62'
SH	22	Morné van den Berg		(substituted on) 43'
FH	23	Manie Libbok		(substituted on) 10'
Coach:
Rassie Erasmus

FB	15	Damian McKenzie
RW	14	Will Jordan
OC	13	Quinn Tupaea		(substituted off) 44'
IC	12	Jordie Barrett
LW	11	Leroy Carter		(substituted off) 68'
FH	10	Ruben Love	(yellow card) 36'
SH	9	Cam Roigard		(substituted off) 67'
N8	8	Ardie Savea (c)		(substituted off) 31'
OF	7	Luke Jacobson
BF	6	Peter Lakai
RL	5	Sam Darry		(substituted off) 62'
LL	4	Tupou Vaa'i
TP	3	Tyrel Lomax		(substituted off) 46'
HK	2	Asafo Aumua		(substituted off) 62'
LP	1	George Bower		(substituted off) 46'
Substitutions:
HK	16	Samisoni Taukei'aho		(substituted on) 62'
PR	17	Xavier Numia		(substituted on) 46'
PR	18	Fletcher Newell		(substituted on) 46'
LK	19	Fabian Holland		(substituted on) 62'
BR	20	Wallace Sititi		(substituted on) 31'
SH	21	Kyle Preston		(substituted on) 67'
CE	22	Anton Lienert-Brown		(substituted on) 44'
WG	23	Josh Moorby		(substituted on) 68'
Coach:
Dave Rennie

Player of the Match:
Ethan Hooker (South Africa)

Assistant referees:
Angus Gardner (Australia)
Christophe Ridley (England)
Television match official:
Eric Gauzins (France)
Foul play review officer:
Brett Cronan (Australia)

Notes:

- Tupou Vaa'i (New Zealand) earned his 50th test cap.

5 September 2026
18:00 ART (UTC−03)

Argentina	28–28	Australia
Try: Matera (2) 35' c, 63' c Mendy 38' c Ruiz 54' c Con: Carreras (4/4) 35', 39', 54', 64'	Report	Try: Wilson 19' c Jorgensen 27' c McReight 46' c Penalty try 69'; Con: Lonergan (3/3) 20', 28', 47'

Estadio Malvinas Argentinas, Mendoza
Referee: James Doleman (New Zealand)

Team details

FB	15	Santiago Carreras	(yellow card) 69'
RW	14	Rodrigo Isgró
OC	13	Lucio Cinti	(yellow card) 68'
IC	12	Faustino Sánchez Valarolo
LW	11	Ignacio Mendy		(substituted off) 75'
FH	10	Nicolás Roger
SH	9	Simón Benítez Cruz		(substituted off) 70'
N8	8	Joaquín Moro		(substituted off) 52'
BF	7	Guido Petti		(substituted off) 75'
OF	6	Pablo Matera (c)
RL	5	Franco Molina	(yellow card) 26'	(substituted off) 67'
LL	4	Efraín Elías
TP	3	Pedro Delgado		(substituted off) 52'
HK	2	Ignacio Ruiz		(substituted off) 70'
LP	1	Boris Wenger		(substituted off) 52'
Substitutions:
HK	16	Leonel Oviedo		(substituted on) 70'
PR	17	Mayco Vivas		(substituted on) 52'
PR	18	Francisco Moreno		(substituted on) 52'
LK	19	Tomás Lavanini		(substituted on) 67'
BR	20	Juan Martín Scelzo		(substituted on) 52'
BR	21	Facundo Cardozo		(substituted on) 75'
SH	22	Gonzalo Bertranou		(substituted on) 70'
WG	23	Mateo Soler		(substituted on) 75'
Coach:
(Argentina) Felipe Contepomi

FB	15	Tom Wright
RW	14	Max Jorgensen
OC	13	Joseph-Aukuso Sua'ali'i
IC	12	Len Ikitau
LW	11	Filipo Daugunu		(substituted off) 14'	(substituted on) 29'	(substituted off) 74'
FH	10	Ben Donaldson				(substituted off) 55'
SH	9	Ryan Lonergan
N8	8	Harry Wilson (c)
OF	7	Fraser McReight
BF	6	Rob Valetini		(substituted off) 65'
RL	5	Jeremy Williams	(yellow card) 33'	(substituted off) 60'
LL	4	Josh Canham
TP	3	Taniela Tupou		(substituted off) 51'
HK	2	Billy Pollard		(substituted off) 51'
LP	1	Angus Bell		(substituted off) 58'
Substitutions:
HK	16	Josh Nasser		(substituted on) 51'
PR	17	Aidan Ross		(substituted on) 58'
PR	18	Massimo de Lutiis		(substituted on) 51'
LK	19	Lukhan Salakaia-Loto		(substituted on) 60'
BR	20	Charlie Cale		(substituted on) 65'
SH	21	Kalani Thomas					(substituted on) 69'
FH	22	Carter Gordon		(substituted on) 14'	(substituted off) 29'	(substituted on) 55'	(substituted off) 69'
CE	23	Isaac Henry				(substituted on) 74'
Coach:
(Australia) Les Kiss

Assistant referees:
Ben O'Keeffe (New Zealand)
Gianluca Gnecchi (Italy)
Television match official:
Glenn Newman (New Zealand)
Foul play review officer:
Richard Kelly (New Zealand)

Notes:

- Facundo Cardozo and Mateo Soler (both Argentina) made their international test debuts.
- Tom Wright (Australia) earned his 50th test cap.
- With this draw, Australia won the series 1–0, securing their first series victory in Argentina.
- Australia reclaimed the Puma Trophy.

12 September 2026
17:00 EDT (UTC-04)

South Africa	43–28	New Zealand
Try: de Allende (2) 14' c, 48' m van den Berg 21' c P. du Toit 51' c Arendse 71' c Hanekom 75' c Con: Feinberg-Mngomezulu (2/3) 15', 22' van den Berg (1/1) 52'; Libbok (2/3) 72'. 76'; Pen: Feinberg-Mngomezulu (1/2) 3'	Report	Try: Taylor 7' c Jordan 36' c Blackadder 62' c B. Barrett 79' c Con: McKenzie (4/4) 8', 37', 63', 79'

M&T Bank Stadium, Baltimore (United States)
Attendance: 68,173
Referee: Karl Dickson (England)

Team details

FB	15	Damian Willemse	(substituted off) 57'
RW	14	Kurt-Lee Arendse
OC	13	Jesse Kriel
IC	12	Damian de Allende
LW	11	Ethan Hooker
FH	10	Sacha Feinberg-Mngomezulu	(substituted off) 60'
SH	9	Morné van den Berg
N8	8	Jasper Wiese
BF	7	Pieter-Steph du Toit	(substituted off) 65'
OF	6	Siya Kolisi (c)	(substituted off) 43'
RL	5	Ruan Nortjé	(substituted off) 43'
LL	4	Eben Etzebeth
TP	3	Wilco Louw	(substituted off) 43'
HK	2	Malcolm Marx	(substituted off) 49'
LP	1	Ox Nché	(substituted off) 43'
Substitutions:
HK	16	Deon Fourie	(substituted on) 49'
PR	17	Gerhard Steenekamp	(substituted on) 43'
PR	18	Thomas du Toit	(substituted on) 43'
BR	19	Lood de Jager	(substituted on) 43'
CE	20	André Esterhuizen	(substituted on) 43'
BR	21	Cameron Hanekom	(substituted on) 65'
SH	22	Cobus Reinach	(substituted on) 60'
FH	23	Manie Libbok	(substituted on) 57'
Coach:
Rassie Erasmus

FB	15	Damian McKenzie
RW	14	Will Jordan
OC	13	Anton Lienert-Brown	(substituted off) 39'
IC	12	Jordie Barrett
LW	11	Josh Moorby	(substituted off) 71'
FH	10	Richie Mo'unga
SH	9	Cam Roigard	(substituted off) 65'
N8	8	Peter Lakai	(substituted off) 6'	(substituted on) 18'
OF	7	Ethan Blackadder
BF	6	Tupou Vaa'i
RL	5	Sam Darry	(substituted off) 57'
LL	4	Patrick Tuipulotu			(substituted off) 54'
TP	3	Fletcher Newell	(substituted off) 48'
HK	2	Codie Taylor (c)	(substituted off) 48'
LP	1	Ethan de Groot	(substituted off) 48'
Substitutions:
HK	16	Asafo Aumua	(substituted on) 48'
PR	17	Xavier Numia	(substituted on) 48'
PR	18	Tyrel Lomax	(substituted on) 48'
LK	19	Josh Lord	(substituted on) 57'
BR	20	Wallace Sititi	(substituted on) 6'	(substituted off) 18'	(substituted on) 54'
SH	21	Kyle Preston	(substituted on) 65'
CE	22	Rieko Ioane	(substituted on) 39'
FH	23	Beauden Barrett	(substituted on) 71'
Coach:
Dave Rennie

Player of the Match:
Morné van den Berg (South Africa)

Assistant referees:
Matthew Carley (England)
Christophe Ridley (England)
Television match official:
Andrew Jackson (England)
Foul play review officer:
Matteo Liperini (Italy)

Notes

- The 68,173 match attendance, was a record attendance for a rugby test match in the United States.
- This was the first test match between South Africa and New Zealand in the United States.

19 September 2026
20:00 CEST (UTC+2)

Poland	33–19	Czech Republic
	Report

Municipal Stadium, Nowy Sącz
Referee: Mieszko Lech (Poland)

26 September 2026
18:00 BST (UTC+1)

Gibraltar	17–28	Malta

Chiswick Rugby Club, London

27 September 2026
17:30 AWST (UTC+8)

Australia	42–38	South Africa
Try: Ikitau (2) 24' c, 27' c Donaldson 39' c Wilson 60' c Jorgensen 64' m Con: Lonergan (4/5) 25', 28', 40', 61'; Pen: Lonergan (3/3) 7', 48', 54'		Try: Grobbelaar 10' c van der Merwe 30' c Penalty try 71' van den Berg 74' c Nché 80' c Con: Pollard (2/2) 11', 31'; Feinberg-Mngomezulu (2/2) 74', 80'; Pen: Pollard (1/1) 4'

Perth Stadium, Perth
Attendance: 54,678
Referee: Andrea Piardi (Italy)

Team details

FB	15	Tom Wright
RW	14	Max Jorgensen
OC	13	Len Ikitau		(substituted off) 54'
IC	12	Hunter Paisami	(yellow card) 76'
LW	11	Joseph-Aukuso Sua'ali'i	(yellow card) 72'
FH	10	Ben Donaldson
SH	9	Ryan Lonergan	(yellow card) 71'
N8	8	Harry Wilson (c)	(yellow card) 69'
OF	7	Fraser McReight		(substituted off) 68'
BF	6	Rob Valetini		(substituted off) 52'
RL	5	Lukhan Salakaia-Loto		(substituted off) 69'
LL	4	Jeremy Williams
TP	3	Allan Alaalatoa		(substituted off) 43'
HK	2	Brandon Paenga-Amosa		(substituted off) 52'
LP	1	Angus Bell		(substituted off) 63'
Substitutions:
HK	16	Billy Pollard		(substituted on) 52'
PR	17	Aidan Ross		(substituted on) 63'
PR	18	Taniela Tupou		(substituted on) 43'
LK	19	Lachlan Shaw		(substituted on) 69'
BR	20	Tom Hooper		(substituted on) 52'
BR	21	Carlo Tizzano		(substituted on) 68'
SH	22	Tate McDermott
WG	23	Harry Potter		(substituted on) 54'
Coach:
(Australia) Les Kiss

FB	15	Aphelele Fassi	(substituted off) 48'
RW	14	Edwill van der Merwe
OC	13	Canan Moodie
IC	12	André Esterhuizen (c)
LW	11	Ethan Hooker
FH	10	Handré Pollard	(substituted off) 48'
SH	9	Herschel Jantjies	(substituted off) 48'
N8	8	Marco van Staden	(substituted off) 48'
BF	7	Elrigh Louw
OF	6	Paul de Villiers
RL	5	Franco Mostert	(substituted off) 48'	(substituted on) 77'
LL	4	Eben Etzebeth		(substituted off) 77'
TP	3	Zachary Porthen	(substituted off) 48'
HK	2	Johan Grobbelaar	(substituted off) 48'
LP	1	Jan-Hendrik Wessels	(substituted off) 48'
Substitutions:
HK	16	Malcolm Marx	(substituted on) 48'
PR	17	Ox Nché	(substituted on) 48'
PR	18	Wilco Louw	(substituted on) 48'
LK	19	Lood de Jager	(substituted on) 48'
BR	20	Jasper Wiese	(substituted on) 48'
SH	21	Morné van den Berg	(substituted on) 48'
FH	22	Sacha Feinberg-Mngomezulu	(substituted on) 48'
FB	23	Quan Horn	(substituted on) 48'
Coach:
Rassie Erasmus

Assistant referees:
Ben O'Keeffe (New Zealand)
James Doleman (New Zealand)
Television match official:
Matteo Liperini (Italy)
Foul play review officer:
Richard Kelly (New Zealand)

Notes:

- Jasper Wiese (South Africa) earned his 50th test cap.
- Australian reclaimed the Mandela Challenge Plate for the first time since 2022.

== October ==
10 October 2026
19:10 NZDT (UTC+13)

New Zealand	50–19	Australia
Try: Lakai 12' c Vaa'i 16' c Roigard 49' c Taylor 55' c Carter 66' c Moorby 73' m Jordan 80' c Con: McKenzie (6/7) 13', 17', 50', 55', 67', 80+1'; Pen: McKenzie (1/1) 33'	Report	Try: Wright 8' c Wilson 37' c Nasser 76' c Con: Lonergan (2/2) 9', 38'

Eden Park, Auckland
Attendance: 46,352
Referee: Andrew Brace (Ireland)

Team details

FB	15	Beauden Barrett
RW	14	Will Jordan
OC	13	Quinn Tupaea
IC	12	Jordie Barrett	(substituted off) 70'
LW	11	Leroy Carter	(substituted off) 68'
FH	10	Damian McKenzie
SH	9	Cam Roigard	(substituted off) 70'
N8	8	Wallace Sititi	(substituted off) 53'	(substituted on) 79'
OF	7	Peter Lakai
BF	6	Tupou Vaa'i
RL	5	Josh Lord	(substituted off) 59'	(substituted on) 72'
LL	4	Scott Barrett		(substituted off) 72'
TP	3	Fletcher Newell	(substituted off) 59'
HK	2	Codie Taylor (c)	(substituted off) 56'	(substituted on) 79'
LP	1	Ethan de Groot	(substituted off) 49'
Substitutions:
HK	16	Asafo Aumua	(substituted on) 56'	(substituted off) 59'
PR	17	George Bower	(substituted on) 49'
PR	18	Pasilio Tosi	(substituted on) 59'
BR	19	Shannon Frizell	(substituted on) 59'
BR	20	Anton Segner	(substituted on) 53'	(substituted off) 79'
SH	21	Kyle Preston	(substituted on) 70'
CE	22	Rieko Ioane	(substituted on) 70'
WG	23	Josh Moorby	(substituted on) 68'
Coach:
(New Zealand) Dave Rennie

FB	15	Tom Wright
RW	14	Max Jorgensen
OC	13	Isaac Henry
IC	12	Len Ikitau	(substituted off) 30'
LW	11	Joseph-Aukuso Suaalii
FH	10	Ben Donaldson	(substituted off) 68'
SH	9	Ryan Lonergan	(substituted off) 63'
N8	8	Harry Wilson (c)
OF	7	Fraser McReight
BF	6	Rob Valetini	(substituted off) 72'
RL	5	Lukhan Salakaia-Loto
LL	4	Jeremy Williams	(substituted off) 59'
TP	3	Allan Alaalatoa	(substituted off) 52'
HK	2	Brandon Paenga-Amosa	(substituted off) 47'
LP	1	Angus Bell	(substituted off) 58'
Substitutions:
HK	16	Josh Nasser	(substituted on) 47'
PR	17	Aidan Ross	(substituted on) 58'
PR	18	Massimo de Lutiis	(substituted on) 52'
LK	19	Lachlan Shaw	(substituted on) 59'
BR	20	Nick Champion de Crespigny	(substituted on) 72'
SH	21	Tate McDermott	(substituted on) 63'
FH	22	Declan Meredith	(substituted on) 58'
WG	23	Harry Potter	(substituted on) 30'
Coach:
(Australia) Les Kiss

Player of the Match:
Cam Roigard (New Zealand)

Assistant referees:
Luke Pearce (England)
Damián Schneider (Argentina)
Television match official:
Mike Adamson (Scotland)
Foul play review officer:
Marius van der Westhuizen (South Africa)

Notes:

- New Zealand retained the Bledisloe Cup.

17 October 2026
15:45 AEDT (UTC+11)

Australia	21–43	New Zealand
Try: Williams 29' c Wright 54' c Daugunu 66' c Con: Lonergan (2/2) 30', 55'; Meredith (1/1) 67'	Report	Try: Moorby (2) 12' c, 43' c B. Barrett (2) 17' c, 40+1' c Lakai 21' c Ioane 26' c Sititi 32' c Con: McKenzie (4/6) 22', 33', 40+2', 44'

Stadium Australia, Sydney
Attendance: 73,399
Referee: Luke Pearce (England)

Team details

FB	15	Tom Wright
RW	14	Max Jorgensen
OC	13	Joseph-Aukuso Suaalii
IC	12	Isaac Henry
LW	11	Harry Potter		(substituted off) 55'
FH	10	Declan Meredith		(substituted off) 73'
SH	9	Ryan Lonergan		(substituted off) 65'
N8	8	Harry Wilson (c)
OF	7	Fraser McReight
BF	6	Rob Valetini		(substituted off) 44'
RL	5	Lukhan Salakaia-Loto		(substituted off) 49'
LL	4	Jeremy Williams	(yellow card) 31'
TP	3	Allan Alaalatoa		(substituted off) 48'
HK	2	Josh Nasser		(substituted off) 48'
LP	1	Aidan Ross		(substituted off) 41'
Substitutions:
HK	16	Billy Pollard		(substituted on) 48'
PR	17	Angus Bell		(substituted on) 41'
PR	18	Massimo de Lutiis		(substituted on) 48'
LK	19	Josh Canham		(substituted on) 44'
BR	20	Carlo Tizzano		(substituted on) 49'
SH	21	Kalani Thomas		(substituted on) 65'
FH	22	Harry McLaughlin-Phillips		(substituted on) 73'
WG	23	Filipo Daugunu		(substituted on) 55'
Coach:
(Australia) Les Kiss

FB	15	Beauden Barrett
RW	14	Will Jordan		(substituted off) 41'
OC	13	Quinn Tupaea		(substituted off) 2'
IC	12	Timoci Tavatavanawai		(substituted off) 69'
LW	11	Josh Moorby
FH	10	Damian McKenzie
SH	9	Cam Roigard		(substituted off) 68'
N8	8	Wallace Sititi		(substituted off) 55'
OF	7	Peter Lakai
BF	6	Tupou Vaa'i
RL	5	Fabian Holland
LL	4	Scott Barrett
TP	3	Fletcher Newell		(substituted off) 50'
HK	2	Codie Taylor (c)		(substituted off) 50'	(substituted on) 69'
LP	1	George Bower		(substituted off) 50'
Substitutions:
HK	16	Samisoni Taukei'aho		(substituted on) 50'	(substituted off) 69'
PR	17	Xavier Numia		(substituted on) 50'
PR	18	Pasilio Tosi		(substituted on) 50'
BR	19	Shannon Frizell		(substituted on) 55'	(substituted off) 61'
BR	20	Du'Plessis Kirifi			(substituted on) 61'
SH	21	Cortez Ratima		(substituted on) 68'
WG	22	Chay Fihaki	(yellow card) 75'	(substituted on) 41'
CE	23	Rieko Ioane		(substituted on) 2'
Coach:
(New Zealand) Dave Rennie

Assistant referees:
Andrew Brace (Ireland)
Damián Schneider (Argentina)
Television match official:
Marius van der Westhuizen (South Africa)
Foul play review officer:
Mike Adamson (Scotland)

Notes:

- Harry McLaughlin-Phillips (Australia) and Chay Fihaki (New Zealand) made their international test debuts.
- Lukhan Salakaia-Loto earned his 50th test cap for Australia.
- Beauden Barrett (New Zealand) became the all-time leading try-scorer against Australia in test rugby with 13.

24 October 2026
14:50 JST (UTC+09)

Japan	28–34	Fiji
Try: Saitō 6' c Dearns (2) 22' c, 53' c Makisi 35' c Con: Matsunaga (4/4) 7', 23', 36', 54'	Report	Try: Salawa 10' c Ikanivere 15' c Samusamuvodre 25' c Tamani 44' c Con: Armstrong-Ravula (4/4) 10', 16', 26', 45'; Pen: Armstrong-Ravula (2/2) 60', 69'

Chichibunomiya Rugby Stadium, Tokyo
Attendance: 16,177
Referee: Nika Amashukeli (Georgia)

Team details

FB	15	Takurō Matsunaga
RW	14	Kazuma Ueda
OC	13	Samisoni Tua
IC	12	Charlie Lawrence	(substituted off) 67'
LW	11	Inoke Burua
FH	10	Ryūnosuke Itō
SH	9	Naoto Saitō (c)	(substituted off) 67'
N8	8	Faulua Makisi	(substituted off) 58'
BF	7	Kanji Shimokawa
OF	6	Ben Gunter	(substituted off) 67'
RL	5	Warner Dearns	(substituted off) 67'
LL	4	Jack Cornelsen
TP	3	Keijiro Tamefusa	(substituted off) 58'
HK	2	Mamoru Harada	(substituted off) 67'
LP	1	Yota Kamimori	(substituted off) 45'
Substitutions:
HK	16	Kenji Sato	(substituted on) 67'
PR	17	Sojiro Otsuka	(substituted on) 45'
PR	18	Sanshiro Kihara	(substituted on) 58'
LK	19	Ruan Botha	(substituted on) 67'
LK	20	Michael Stolberg	(substituted on) 58'
BR	21	Esei Ha'angana	(substituted on) 67'
SH	22	Shinobu Fujiwara	(substituted on) 67'
CE	23	Chisu Lee	(substituted on) 67'
Coach:
Eddie Jones

FB	15	Isaac Ratumaitavuki-Kneepkens
RW	14	Nacani Boginisoko
OC	13	Tuidraki Samusamuvodre		(substituted off) 60'
IC	12	Isikeli Rabitu
LW	11	Joji Nasova
FH	10	Isaiah Armstrong-Ravula		(substituted off) 54'
SH	9	Terio Tamani		(substituted off) 60'
N8	8	Motikai Murray	(red card) 34'
BF	7	Kitione Salawa Jr.
OF	6	Aporosa Vuniyayawa
RL	5	Isoa Nasilasila
LL	4	Mesake Vocevoce		(substituted off) 60'
TP	3	Inoke Ravuiwasa		(substituted off) 60'
HK	2	Tevita Ikanivere (c)		(substituted off) 54'
LP	1	Peni Ravai		(substituted off) 60'
Substitutions:
HK	16	Kavaia Tagivetaua		(substituted on) 54'
PR	17	Meli Tuni		(substituted on) 60'
PR	18	Mesake Doge		(substituted on) 60'
LK	19	Vilive Miramira
BR	20	Peni Naruma		(substituted on) 60'
SH	21	Frank Lomani		(substituted on) 60'
FH	22	Ben Volavola		(substituted on) 54'
CE	23	Kavekini Boselawa		(substituted on) 60'
Coach:
Jake White

Assistant referees:
Reuben Keane (Australia
Morgan White (Hong Kong China)
Television match official:
Glenn Newman (New Zealand)
Foul play review officer:
Matt Rodden (Hong Kong China)

Notes:

- Ruan Botha, Chisu Lee, Sanshiro Kihara (all Japan), Nacani Boginisoko, Kavekini Boselawa, Peni Naruma and Aporosa Vuniyayawa (all Fiji) made their international debuts.

24 October 2026
15:00 CAT (UTC+02)

Zimbabwe	36–33	Namibia
Try: Larkan 14' m Makwasha 18' c Burnett 27' c Muzanargwo 30' c Mudariki 55' c Con: Hayes (4/5) 19', 28', 31', 56'; Pen: Hayes (1/1) 72'	Report	Try: Drotsky (2) 22' c, 35' c Penalty try 52'; Combrinck 68' c Nel 80' m Con: Tromp (3/4) 23', 36', 69'

National Sports Stadium, Harare
Attendance: 16,227

24 October 2026
18:00 CDT (UTC-05)

United States XV	12–61	Australia A
Try: Baska 23' c O'Keeffe 41' m Con: Hilsenbeck (1/2) 24'	Report	Try: Pietsch (2) 4' c, 72' c Frost 8' m Brial 20' c Faessler 34' c Hastie 44' c Pritchard 48' c McLaughlin-Phillips 63' c Ryan 74' c Con: Edmed (5/6) 5', 21', 35', 45', 49'; McLaughlin-Phillips (3/3) 54', 73', 75'

Geodis Park, Nashville
Attendance: 8,186
Referee: Katsuki Furuse (Japan)

Team details

FB	15	Michael Baska
RW	14	Noah Brown
OC	13	Tavite Lopeti
IC	12	Dominic Besag
LW	11	Mark O'Keeffe
FH	10	Christopher Hilsenbeck	(substituted off) 56'
SH	9	Oscar Lennon	(substituted off) 52'
N8	8	Makeen Alikhan
OF	7	Paddy Ryan
BF	6	Benjamín Bonasso	(substituted off) 49'
RL	5	Jason Damm (c)	(substituted off) 62'
LL	4	Nathan Den Hoedt	(substituted off) 49'
TP	3	Tonga Kofe	(substituted off) 45'
HK	2	Shilo Klein	(substituted off) 45'
LP	1	Payton Telea-Ilalio	(substituted off) 45'
Substitutions:
PR	16	Kaleb Geiger	(substituted on) 45'
PR	17	Ezekiel Lindenmuth	(substituted on) 45'
PR	18	Mason Pedersen	(substituted on) 45'
LK	19	Sam Golla	(substituted on) 49'
BR	20	Marno Redelinghuys	(substituted on) 49'
BR	21	Jamason Faʻanana-Schultz	(substituted on) 62'
SH	22	Ruben de Haas	(substituted on) 52'
FH	23	Luke Carty	(substituted on) 56'
Coach:
Scott Lawrence

FB	15	Mac Grealy
RW	14	Tim Ryan
OC	13	Kadin Pritchard
IC	12	David Feliuai	(red card) 15'
LW	11	Dylan Pietsch
FH	10	Tane Edmed		(substituted off) 60'
SH	9	Nathan Hastie		(substituted off) 60'
N8	8	Joe Brial		(substituted off) 56'
OF	7	Rory Scott
BF	6	Will Harris
RL	5	Miles Amatosero		(substituted off) 68'
LL	4	Nick Frost
TP	3	Zane Nonggorr		(substituted off) 61'
HK	2	Matt Faessler (c)		(substituted off) 56'
LP	1	Tom Robertson		(substituted off) 52'
Substitutions:
HK	16	Ethan Dobbins		(substituted on) 56'
PR	17	Tom Lambert		(substituted on) 52'
PR	18	Rhys van Nek		(substituted on) 61'
BR	19	Toby Macpherson		(substituted on) 56'
LK	20	Eamon Doyle		(substituted on) 68'
SH	21	Kalani Thomas		(substituted on) 60'
FH	22	Harry McLaughlin-Phillips		(substituted on) 60'
WG	23	Lachie Anderson		(substituted on) 35'
Coach:
Stephen Larkham

Assistant referees:
Damián Schneider (Argentina)
Robin Kaluzniak (Canada)
Television match official:
Cam Russell (Canada)

30 October 2026
20:00 EDT (UTC-04)

United States XV	0–52	Australia A
	Report	Try: Faessler 5' c Toole 8' m Thomas 14' c Grealy 21' c Frost 39' c McLaughlin-Phillips 50' c Brial 53' m Ieli 83' c Con: McLaughlin-Phillips (6/8) 6', 15', 22', 40', 51', 84'

Sports Illustrated Stadium, Harrison
Referee: Damián Schneider (Argentina)

Team details

FB	15	David Coetzer
RW	14	Conner Mooneyham
OC	13	Wayne van der Bank
IC	12	Cassh Maluia	(substituted off) 41'
LW	11	Joe Mano		(substituted off) 75'
FH	10	Luke Carty	(substituted off) 65'	(substituted on) 75'
SH	9	Ruben de Haas	(substituted off) 7'
N8	8	Jamason Faʻanana-Schultz	(substituted off) 46'	(substituted on) 57'
OF	7	Paddy Ryan	(substituted off) 57'
BF	6	Marno Redelinghuys (c)
RL	5	Sam Golla	(substituted off) 56'
LL	4	Nathan Den Hoedt
TP	3	Mason Pedersen		(substituted off) 57'
HK	2	Kaleb Geiger	(substituted off) 45'
LP	1	Ezekiel Lindenmuth	(substituted off) 45'
Substitutions:
PR	16	Shilo Klein	(substituted on) 45'
PR	17	Fakaʻosi Pifeleti	(substituted on) 45'
PR	18	Tonga Kofe	(substituted on) 46'
LK	19	Vili Helu	(substituted on) 57'
BR	20	Benjamin Bonasso	(substituted on) 57'
SH	21	Oscar Lennon	(substituted on) 7'
FB	22	Michael Baska	(substituted on) 65'
CE	23	Dan Kriel	(substituted on) 41'
Coach:
Scott Lawrence

FB	15	Mac Grealy
RW	14	Corey Toole
OC	13	Zac Lomax	(substituted off) 61'
IC	12	Kadin Pritchard			(substituted off) 72'
LW	11	Lachie Anderson	(substituted off) 35'	(substituted on) 40'
FH	10	Harry McLaughlin-Phillips
SH	9	Kalani Thomas	(substituted off) 52'
N8	8	Joe Brial
OF	7	Luke Reimer
BF	6	Will Harris	(substituted off) 40'
RL	5	Toby Macpherson	(substituted off) 67'
LL	4	Nick Frost
TP	3	Zane Nonggorr	(substituted off) 61'
HK	2	Matt Faessler (c)	(substituted off) 57'
LP	1	Tom Lambert	(substituted off) 57'
Substitutions:
HK	16	Lachlan Lonergan	(substituted on) 57'
PR	17	Lington Ieli	(substituted on) 57'
PR	18	Edwin Langi	(substituted on) 61'
LK	19	Eamon Doyle	(substituted on) 67'
BR	20	Rory Scott	(substituted on) 40'
SH	21	Nathan Hastie	(substituted on) 52'
FH	22	Tane Edmed	(substituted on) 61'
WG	23	Tim Ryan	(substituted on) 35'	(substituted off) 40'	(substituted on) 72'
Coach:
Stephen Larkham

Assistant referees:
Katsuki Furuse (Japan)
Robin Kaluzniak (Canada)
Television match official:
Leo Colgan (Ireland)

31 October 2026
20:00 CET (UTC+01)

Belgium	27–17	Hong Kong
Try: Van den Bussche 9' c Cornez (2) 37' c, 70' m Deceuninck 39' m Con: De Francq (2/4) 10', 38'; Pen: De Francq (1/1) 43'		Try: Bartlett 4' c Nell 78' c Con: Altier (1/1) 5' de Thierry (1/1) 79'; Pen: Altier (1/1) 24'

Edmond Machtens Stadium, Brussels
Referee: Benoit Rousselet (France)

Team details

FB	15	Hugo De Francq
RW	14	Dazzy Cornez	(substituted off) 71'
OC	13	Théo Adaba	(substituted off) 40'
IC	12	Lucas Michiels
LW	11	Thomas Wallraf
FH	10	Guillem Fernandez Grau
SH	9	Julien Berger	(substituted off) 48'
N8	8	Maurice Fromont	(substituted off) 48'
OF	7	Jérémie Brasseur		(substituted off) 79'
BF	6	Flor Van den Bussche	(substituted off) 62'	(substituted on) 79'
RL	5	Goran De Clercq
LL	4	Toon Deceuninck
TP	3	Jean-Baptiste De Clercq (c)	(substituted off) 67'
HK	2	Alexandre Raynier	(substituted off) 53'
LP	1	Rémi De Wolf	(substituted off) 67'
Substitutions:
PR	16	Malik Hakem	(substituted on) 67'
HK	17	Julien Masure	(substituted on) 53'
PR	18	Samuel Opsomer	(substituted on) 67'
LK	19	Arthur Smeets	(substituted on) 62'
BR	20	Paul Gérard	(substituted on) 48'
SH	21	Timothé Rifon	(substituted on) 48'
FB	22	Miguel Fachada	(substituted on) 71'
CE	23	Jack Kellner	(substituted on) 40'
Coach:
Laurent Dossat

FB	15	Paul Altier	(substituted off) 40'
RW	14	Charles Higson-Smith
OC	13	Penetana Carter-Smith	(substituted off) 55'
IC	12	Isaac Campbell-Wu
LW	11	Sebastian Brien
FH	10	Nathan de Thierry
SH	9	Jack Combes	(substituted off) 58'
N8	8	Joshua Hrstich (c)	(substituted off) 62'
OF	7	Pierce MacKinlay-West
BF	6	Jack Bartlett
RL	5	James Rivers
LL	4	Max Murphy	(substituted off) 62'
TP	3	Faizal Solomona Penesa	(substituted off) 50'
HK	2	Harry Baron	(substituted off) 47'
LP	1	Sunia Fameitau	(substituted off) 62'
Substitutions:
HK	16	Alexander Post	(substituted on) 47'
PR	17	Thomas Concu	(substituted on) 62'
PR	18	Keelan Chapman	(substituted on) 50'
LK	19	Lachlan Doheny	(substituted on) 62'
BR	20	Dana Fourie	(substituted on) 62'
SH	21	Brendon Nell	(substituted on) 58'
FB	22	Dylan McCann	(substituted on) 40'
CE	23	Marcus Ramage	(substituted on) 55'
Coach:
Andrew Douglas

Assistant referees:
Adele Robert (Belgium)
Geoffrey Serralbo (Belgium)

Notes:

- Malik Hakem (Belgium) and Penetana Carter-Smith (Hong Kong) made their international debuts.

== November ==
6 November 2026
19:45 GMT (UTC+0)

England A	59–24	Argentina XV
Try: Caluori (2) 2' c, 27' c Ojomoh 19' c Atkinson 24' c Kenningham 44' m Blamire 48' m Northmore (2) 56' c, 76' c Elliott 69' c Con: Atkinson (5/7) 3', 20', 25', 28', 57'; Searle (2/2) 70', 77'	Report	Try: Criado 7' c Delgado 14' c Pernas 38' m Serpa 51' m Con: Serpa (2/4) 8', 14'

Recreation Ground, Bath
Attendance: 9,000
Referee: Nika Amashukeli (Georgia)

Team details

FB	15	Joe Carpenter
RW	14	Noah Caluori
OC	13	Luke Northmore
IC	12	Max Ojomoh
LW	11	George Hendy		(substituted off) 57'
FH	10	Charlie Atkinson		(substituted off) 57'
SH	9	Caolan Englefield		(substituted off) 66'
N8	8	Fitz Harding (c)
OF	7	Jack Kenningham
BF	6	Ethan Roots		(substituted off) 57'
RL	5	Ben Bamber
LL	4	Joe Batley		(substituted off) 57'
TP	3	Afolabi Fasogbon		(substituted off) 49'
HK	2	Jamie Blamire		(substituted off) 61'
LP	1	Archie van der Flier	(yellow card) 7'	(substituted off) 61'
Replacements:
HK	16	Nathan Jibulu		(substituted on) 61'
PR	17	Alex O'Driscoll		(substituted on) 61'
PR	18	George Kloska		(substituted on) 49'
LK	19	Tom Lockett		(substituted on) 49'
BR	20	Max Hicks		(substituted on) 57'
SH	21	Lucas Friday		(substituted on) 66'
FH	22	Billy Searle		(substituted on) 57'
WG	23	Tobias Elliott		(substituted on) 57'
Coach:
(England) Mark Mapletoft

FB	15	Tobías Wade
RW	14	Santiago Pernas
OC	13	Agustín Fraga
IC	12	Benjamín Ordiz
LW	11	Franco Rossetto	(substituted off) 63'
FH	10	Federico Serpa	(substituted off) 57'
SH	9	Nicolás Viola	(substituted off) 57'
N8	8	Benjamín Grondona	(substituted off) 57'
OF	7	Juan Penoucos
BF	6	Nicolás D'Amorim (c)
RL	5	Enzo Ocampo	(substituted off) 39'
LL	4	Rodrigo Fernández Criado
TP	3	Pedro Delgado	(substituted off) 52'
HK	2	Juan Manuel Vivas	(substituted off) 62'
LP	1	Diego Correa	(substituted off) 52'
Replacements:
HK	16	Francisco Lusarreta	(substituted on) 62'
PR	17	Ignacio Calles	(substituted on) 52'
PR	18	Gael Galván	(substituted on) 52'
LK	19	Francisco Sluga	(substituted on) 39'
BR	20	Agustín Sarelli	(substituted on) 57'
SH	21	Alejo Sugasti	(substituted on) 52'
FH	22	Juan Segundo Martín Montilla	(substituted on) 57'
CE	23	Matías Osadczuk	(substituted on) 63'
Coach:
(Argentina) Álvaro Galindo

Assistant referees:
Sara Cox (England)
Jamie Parr (England)
Television match official:
Hamish Smales (England)

11 November 2026
19:45 GMT (UTC+0)

UK Armed Forces XV	28–53	Belgium
	Report

Kingsholm Stadium, Gloucester

14 November 2026
13:30 CET (UTC+01)

Slovakia	17–27	Albania
Try: Phatty (2) 36' m, 80' m Klco 48' c Con: Walek (1/3) 49'	Report	Try: Dudi 16' c Hasanoviq 20' m Hamati 56' c Vreko 76' m Con: Vreko (2/4) 17', 56'; Pen: Vreko 7'

PFK Piešťany stadium, Piešťany

20 November 2026
20:00 CET (UTC+1)

Italy XV	19–42	Queensland Reds
Try: Wilson 15' c Montemauri 43' m De Villiers 72' m Con: Montemauri (1/3) 16'	Report	Try: Miln 19' c Conway 28' c Latu 55' c Anderson 60' c J. Brial 76' c Blake 80' c Con: Miln (6/6) 20', 29', 56', 60', 77', 80+1'

Stadio Comunale di Monigo, Treviso
Attendance: 1,659
Referee: Gianluca Gnecchi (Italy)

20 November 2026
19:45 WET (UTC+0)

Ireland XV	61–12	Fiji A
Try: Ryan (2) 4' m, 69' c McCarthy (2) 17' c, 46' c Penalty try 23'; Carbery 37' c Gunne 51' c Gleeson 65' c Devine 74' c Con: Carbery (5/6) 18', 38', 47', 51', 66'; Murphy (2/2) 70', 75'	Report	Try: Lesivoukionoilau 7' c Naseara 56' m Con: Baleilevuka (1/2) 8'

Musgrave Park, Cork
Referee: George Selwood (England)

Team details

FB	15	Todd Lawlor
RW	14	Finn Treacy
OC	13	James Hume		(substituted off) 60'
IC	12	Cathal Forde
LW	11	Daniel Ryan
FH	10	Joey Carbery		(substituted off) 63'
SH	9	Fintan Gunne		(substituted off) 63'
N8	8	Brian Gleeson
OF	7	Will Connors		(substituted off) 63'
BF	6	David McCann
RL	5	Edwin Edogbo		(substituted off) 60'
LL	4	Fineen Wycherley
TP	3	Kieran Brookes		(substituted off) 51'
HK	2	Gus McCarthy (c)		(substituted off) 66'
LP	1	Alex Usanov		(substituted off) 63'
Replacements:
HK	16	Eoin de Buitléar	(yellow card) 73'	(substituted on) 66'
PR	17	Jeremy Loughman		(substituted on) 63'
PR	18	Jack Aungier		(substituted on) 51'
LK	19	Conor O’Tighearnaigh		(substituted on) 60'
BR	20	Scott Penny		(substituted on) 63'
SH	21	Matthew Devine		(substituted on) 63'
FH	22	Jack Murphy		(substituted on) 63'
CE	23	Dan Kelly		(substituted on) 60'
Coach:
(Ireland) Mark Sexton

FB	15	Seta Tuicuvu
RW	14	Kaminieli Rasaku		(substituted off) 29'	(substituted on) 35'	(substituted off) 59'
OC	13	Sireli Masiwini				(substituted off) 36'	(substituted on) 56'
IC	12	Jope Naseara
LW	11	Josua Vici
FH	10	Joeli Baleilevuka		(substituted off) 73'
SH	9	Cameron Nordli-Kelemeti		(substituted off) 66'
N8	8	Ratu Meli Turagaca
OF	7	Apisalome Kuruisaqila	(yellow card) 27'	(substituted off) 50'
BF	6	Pita Lesivoukionoilau (c)
RL	5	Petero Mailulu		(substituted off) 50'
LL	4	Isaia Lotawa	(yellow card) 23'
TP	3	Mesake Doge	(yellow card) 25'	(red card) 36'
HK	2	Sesoni Tamani		(substituted off) 59'
LP	1	Emosi Tumania		(substituted off) 56'
Replacements:
HK	16	Osea Dasalusalu		(substituted on) 59'
PR	17	Sylvester Vakauliafa		(substituted on) 56'
PR	18	Samu Tawake		(substituted on) 29'	(substituted off) 35'	(substituted on) 36'
LK	19	Mosese Tabuakoto		(substituted on) 50'
BR	20	Isoa Koronawai		(substituted on) 50'
SH	21	Anasa Raqili		(substituted on) 66'
FB	22	Iliesa Baravilala		(substituted on) 73'
WG	23	Apete Narogo				(substituted on) 59'
Coach:
(France) Patrice Lagisquet

Assistant referees:
Benoit Rousselet (France)
Hugo Dutreuilh (France)
Television match official:
Brian MacNeice (Ireland)

21 November 2026
14:00 CET (UTC+1)

Tunisia	25–14	Switzerland

Menzah Rugby Stadium, Tunis

21 November 2026
14:00 PET (UTC−5)

Peru	7–23	Cayman Islands

Fundo La Querencia, Lima

24 November 2026
14:00 CET (UTC+1)

Tunisia	v	Poland

Menzah Rugby Stadium, Tunis

== See also ==
- 2026 women's rugby union internationals
- 2026 Six Nations Championship
- 2026 Rugby Europe Championship
- 2026 Nations Championship
- 2026 World Rugby Nations Cup
- 2026 Asia Rugby Championship
- 2026 Americas Rugby Championship
- 2026 World Rugby Pacific Nations Cup
- 2026 Rugby's Greatest Rivalry tour
