= Lachlan Shaw =

Lachlan Shaw may refer to:

- Lachlan Shaw (author) (1692–1777), Scottish reverend, historian and author (The History of the Province of Moray)
- Lachlan Shaw (cricketer) (born 2002), Australian cricketer
- Lachlan Shaw (rugby union) (born 2003), Australian rugby union player
