= St Paul's Collegiate School =

Location
- 77 Hukanui Road, Chartwell; Hamilton, 3210; New Zealand; 37.7603°S 175.2828°E

Information
- Type: Private, Boarding
- Motto: State in Fide (Stand Firm in the Faith)
- Denomination: Anglican
- Established: 1959; 67 years ago
- Ministry of Education Institution no.: 130
- Headmaster: Ben Skeen
- Years: 9–13
- Gender: Boys (Years 9–10); Coeducational (Years 11–13)
- Enrolment: 972
- Colours: Black and gold
- Socio-economic decile: 10
- Website: www.stpauls.school.nz

St Paul's Collegiate School is a private (independent) Anglican secondary school in Hamilton, New Zealand. Originally opened in 1959 as a boys-only school, the school began admitting girls in years 12 to 13 in 1985, then in years 11 to 13 in 2010, and finally in years 9 to 10 in 2026.

St Paul's Collegiate was founded by the Anglican community, including the parents of some Southwell School students.

The school is on land that was a part of the farm, Cherrybrook, which belonged to Andrew Primrose, Esq., J.P. an early settler and resident of Waikato. The land purchased by Primrose had been confiscated from Māori by the Grey Colonial government.

The school owns and operates Tihoi Venture School, on the edge of the Pureora Forest Park around 50 km west of Taupō. Year 10 students attend Tihoi for two terms (18 weeks) as part of an adventure-based character development and education programme.

== Enrolment ==
As a private school, St Paul's Collegiate receives little government funding and charges parents tuition fees to cover costs. As of 2014, the school fees are approximately NZ$19,050 per year for day students and NZ$29,800 for boarders. The exception is in Year 10 with the 18 weeks at Tihoi Venture School, where the fees are NZ$25,170 for day students and NZ$30,400 for boarders. Fees for international students are higher.

At the March 2012 Education Review Office (ERO) review of the school, St Paul's Collegiate had 675 students, including 31 international students. The school's gender composition was 85% male and 15% female, or 72% male and 28% female, after excluding the boys-only Years 9 and 10. Around 71% of students at the school identified as New Zealand European (Pakeha), 9% as Māori, and 5% each as Chinese, Indian, and Pacific Islanders.

== Houses ==
The school has eight school houses: four for day boys, three for boarding boys, and one for girls.

| Clark | a boarding-only house founded in 1967, named after former school board chairman G. I. Clark |
| Fitchett | a day house founded in 1999, named after the chairman of the school board Marcus Fitchett |
| Hall | a day house founded in 1973, named after foundation board member Harry Hall |
| Hamilton | a day house founded in 1964, named after the school's location in Hamilton city |
| Harington | the sole girls' house founded in 1985, named after former school board member Pamela Harington |
| Sargood | a boarding house founded in 1961, named after Sir Percy Sargood, whose Sargood Trust donated funds to build the boarding house. |
| School | a day house founded in 1959. It was formerly also a boarding house. |
| Williams | a boarding house founded in 1963, named after A. B. Williams who donated funds to build the boarding house. |

== Notable alumni ==
- Dan Ammann – President of General Motors
- James Dallinger – member of New Zealand rowing crew, Beijing Olympics 2008
- Paul Gerritsen – member of New Zealand rowing crew
- Richard Harman – political journalist
- Geoff Hines – All Black
- Lance Hohaia – member of the New Zealand Warriors Rugby League Team
- Tom Phillips - fugitive
- Samisoni Taukei'aho – All Black
- Sam Uffindell – Member of Parliament (also attended King's College)
- Simon Upton – former Cabinet Minister
- Daniel Vettori – former captain of the New Zealand cricket team
- Jeremy Wells – TV personality (also attended Wanganui Collegiate School)
- Olivia Wensley – Women's Rights Activist, failed Mayoral candidate and CEO.
- Chris Wood – All Whites footballer
- Gideon Wrampling – New Zealand Schoolboys, New Zealand under-20 and Waikato Chiefs rugby player.

== Notable staff ==
- Paul Hodder, Director of Rugby, Cricketer, rugby union player and coach
- Ryan McCarthy, Director of Strength and Conditioning, Head of Hall house Rugby union player and weightlifter.
- Peter Rickman – Anglican priest, former Dean of Waikato and chaplain of St Paul's Collegiate School.
