= Paul Hodder =

New Zealand rugby player and cricketer

- Full name: Paul Sidney Hodder
- Born: 13 April 1965 (age 61) Hamilton, New Zealand

Rugby union career
- Positions: Fullback; wing
Provincial / State sides
Years	Team	Apps	(Points)
1985	Waikato	10	(46)
- Cricket career

Cricket information
- Role: All-rounder

Domestic team information
- Years: Team
- 1986/87: Northern Districts

Career statistics
Competition	List A
Matches	4
Runs scored	32
Batting average	8.00
100s/50s	0/0
Top score	18
Balls bowled	128
Wickets	2
Bowling average	53.00
5 wickets in innings	0
10 wickets in match	0
Best bowling	1/12
Catches/stumpings	1/–
- Source: Cricinfo, 28 December 2021

Paul Sidney Hodder (born 13 April 1965) is a New Zealand rugby union coach, and former rugby union player and cricketer.

== Rugby union ==
Hodder was born in Hamilton, New Zealand. He played under-age rugby union for Waikato and New Zealand, and played 10 senior matches for Waikato in 1985. He spent the 1990s in the north-east of England as a professional, playing for and coaching Middlesbrough and West Hartlepool.

Hodder returned to New Zealand in 2001, working as a rugby development officer and high performance manager with Waikato Rugby. He then spent four years in Japan as coach of the Kamaishi Seawaves. When the city of Kamaishi suffered extensive damage in the 2011 tsunami, the rugby ground became a relief hub, and Hodder and his team took a prominent part working voluntarily in local relief operations.

Since 2015 Hodder has worked as rugby and cricket coach at St Paul's Collegiate School in Hamilton, New Zealand. One of the boys he coached there is Samisoni Taukei'aho, who is now an international player. In 2021 Hodder was appointed the school's Director of Rugby. He is also Head Coach of the Waikato Chiefs under-20 development team and is a coaching developer at the University of Waikato.

== Cricket ==
An all-rounder, Hodder played under-19 cricket for Northern Districts from 1981 to 1983. He played in four List A cricket matches for Northern Districts in 1986–87.

== Personal life ==
Hodder and his wife Krista have five children.
