= Ryan McCarthy =

Ryan McCarthy may refer to:

- Ryan D. McCarthy, United States Secretary of the Army
- Ryan McCarthy (American football), American football coach
- Ryan McCarthy (basketball), American college basketball coach
- Ryan McCarthy (rugby union) (born 1979), New Zealand rugby union footballer
