= Peter Rickman =

Anglican priest and former Dean of Waikato

Peter Alan Rickman is a New Zealand Anglican priest who formerly served as Dean of Waikato at St Peter's Cathedral, Hamilton. His ministry has included parish ministry, school chaplaincy and prison chaplaincy in both New Zealand and England.

== Early life and education ==
Rickman was born in 1968 and grew up in Hampshire, England. Before entering the ministry, he undertook training in banking and worked as a chartered banker for Coutts and Lloyds Bank in London.

In 1994, he entered Ripon College Cuddesdon, an Anglican theological college near Oxford. He graduated in 1997 with a Bachelor of Theology with Honours from the University of Oxford.

== Ministry ==
Rickman was ordained in 1998 and began his ministry as an assistant curate at Bitterne Park in Southampton, England. He served in the parish for approximately four years.

In 2001, Rickman moved to New Zealand after being appointed chaplain of St Paul's Collegiate School in Hamilton. He held the position for approximately three and a half years, providing pastoral and spiritual support to students and staff.

In 2004, he returned to England, initially serving as a prison chaplain at HM Prison Winchester. He subsequently became priest-in-charge of the parishes of Bransgore and Hinton Admiral in Dorset, a position he held until 2012. His responsibilities included ministry at St Mary's Church in Bransgore, All Saints Church at Thorney Hill and St Michael's with All Angels at Hinton Admiral. During this period, he also served as a sub-chaplain at HM Prison Winchester.

== Dean of Waikato ==
Following his ministry in England, Rickman returned to New Zealand and was appointed Dean of Waikato at St Peter's Cathedral, Hamilton. The position involved responsibility for the cathedral's worship, pastoral ministry, administration and community engagement.

During his time as dean, he oversaw a team of more than 200 volunteers and 10 employees. His work included community outreach programmes supporting young people, older people and vulnerable members of the community, including homeless people and those experiencing mental health difficulties.

In 2014, he was appointed as the Bishop's nominee to the Waikato Anglican College Trust board.

== Return to St Paul's Collegiate School ==
In 2015, Rickman returned temporarily to St Paul's Collegiate School to assist its chaplaincy department during a period of transition.

In 2018, he returned to the school as chaplain, becoming involved in its pastoral care and community service programmes.

In 2019, Rickman helped organise a medical mission to the Solomon Islands, bringing together members of the Waikato community to support healthcare services in island communities.
