= Edwill van der Merwe =

South African rugby union player

- Full name: Edwill Charl van der Merwe
- Born: 12 April 1996 (age 30) Kylemore, South Africa
- Height: 1.80 m (5 ft 11 in)
- Weight: 90 kg (200 lb)
- School: Paul Roos Gymnasium

Rugby union career
- Position: Wing
- Current team: Sharks
Senior career
Years	Team	Apps	(Points)
2016–2021	Western Province	31	(75)
2019–2021	Stormers	13	(35)
2021–2025	Lions	76	(170)
2022–2025	Golden Lions	9	(25)
2025-present	Sharks	18	(0)
- Correct as of 8 September 2025
International career
Years	Team	Apps	(Points)
2016	South Africa Under-20	4	(15)
2024–	South Africa	7	(30)
- Correct as of 8 August 2026

Edwill Charl van der Merwe (born 12 April 1996) is a South African rugby union player for the Sharks in the United Rugby Championship and the South Africa national team. His regular position is wing.

He made his Super Rugby debut for the Stormers in their match against the Sunwolves in June 2019, starting on the left wing.

== International career ==
Edwill van der Merwe made his Springbok debut on June 22, 2024, in a match against Wales national rugby union team at Twickenham Stadium. The 28-year-old winger, was rewarded for his impressive form with the Lions in the United Rugby Championship, Despite not being part of the initial alignment camps earlier in the year, he was called up to the squad on June 8, 2024, and made the most of his opportunity and was selected for the South Africa squad to face Wales. Van der Merwe made a significant impact on the game, scoring a stunning solo try late in the match and being named the Man of the Match. The Springboks dominated the match, ultimately winning 41-13.

== Statistics ==
=== Test match record ===
As of 27 September 2026

Opponent	P	W	D	L	Try	Pts	%Won
Argentina	1	1	0	0	1	5	100
Australia	2	0	0	2	1	5	0
Georgia	1	1	0	0	2	10	100
Italy	2	2	0	0	2	10	100
Scotland	1	1	0	0	0	0	100
Wales	1	1	0	0	1	5	100
Total	8	6	0	2	7	35	75

=== International tries ===
As of 27 September 2026

Try	Opposing team	Location	Venue	Competition	Date	Result	Score
1	Wales	London, England	Twickenham Stadium	2024 mid-year test	22 June 2024	Win	41–13
2	Italy	Gqeberha, South Africa	Nelson Mandela Bay Stadium	2025 Italy tour of South Africa	12 July 2025	Win	45–0
3	Italy	Gqeberha, South Africa	Nelson Mandela Bay Stadium	2025 Italy tour of South Africa	12 July 2025	Win	45–0
4	Georgia	Mbombela, South Africa	Mbombela Stadium	2025 mid-year tests	19 July 2025	Win	55–10
5	Georgia	Mbombela, South Africa	Mbombela Stadium	2025 mid-year tests	19 July 2025	Win	55–10
6	Argentina	Buenos Aires, Argentina	José Amalfitani Stadium	2026 test	8 August 2026	Win	10–17
7	Australia	Perth, Australia	Perth Stadium	2026 test	27 September 2026	Loss	42–38
