= Santiago Grondona =

Argentine rugby union player

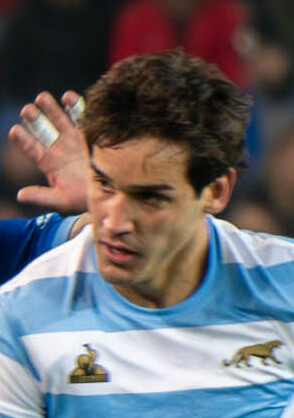
- Grondona in 2024
- Born: 25 July 1998 (age 28) Buenos Aires, Argentina
- Height: 2 m (6 ft 7 in)
- Weight: 116 kg (256 lb; 18 st 4 lb)
- Notable relative: Benjamín Grondona (brother)

Rugby union career
- Position(s): Flanker, Number 8
- Current team: Section Paloise
Senior career
Years	Team	Apps	(Points)
2019	Jaguares XV	8	(0)
2020	Jaguares	1	(0)
2022–2023	Exeter Chiefs	19	(20)
2023	Pau	8	(10)
2023–2026	Bristol Bears	20	(10)
2026-	Section Paloise		
- Correct as of 28 August 2023
International career
Years	Team	Apps	(Points)
2018	Argentina U20	4	(5)
2018–2021	Argentina XV	3	(5)
2020–	Argentina	25	(5)
- Correct as of 28 August 2023

Santiago Grondona (born 25 July 1998) is an Argentine professional rugby union player who plays as a flanker for Premiership Rugby club Bristol Bears and the Argentina national team.

== Club career ==
=== Early life and youth career ===
Santiago Grondona was born in Buenos Aires, Argentina. He began his rugby career at Club Champagnat, where he developed his skills during his youth. He represented Argentina in various youth national teams, including the Argentina national under-20 rugby union team.

=== Professional career ===
==== Jaguares ====
Grondona joined the Jaguares, Argentina's professional team in Super Rugby. On 21 November 2019, he was named in the Jaguares squad for the 2020 Super Rugby season. Grondona made his debut on 7 March 2020 against the Sharks. His time with the Jaguares was cut short due to the global disruptions caused by the COVID-19 pandemic.

==== Newcastle Falcons ====
At the end of 2020, Grondona signed with Newcastle Falcons in the English Premiership. However, he did not play any matches for the team after suffering a serious anterior cruciate ligament injury that sidelined him for an extended period.

==== Exeter Chiefs ====
In November 2021, Grondona signed with Exeter Chiefs as an injury replacement for Jacques Vermeulen. He quickly extended his contract with the Chiefs in March 2022 and became a key player for the team.

==== Section Paloise ====
In February 2023, Grondona joined Section Paloise as a medical joker to cover for injuries until the end of the 2022–23 Top 14 season. At Stade du Hameau, he reunited with his former Exeter Chiefs teammate, Joe Simmonds. Grondona quickly made an impact on the team, despite being released at the end of the season as Pau prepared to welcome Sam Whitelock following the 2023 Rugby World Cup.

==== Bristol Bears ====
Santiago Grondona joined Bristol Bears in 2023. Despite being sidelined due to a knee injury sustained on international duty, Grondona extended his contract with the club on 3 April 2024. Although he has yet to make an appearance for Bristol, Grondona made an immediate impact by scoring two tries on his debut. His brother Benjamín Grondona also plays for Bristol.

== International career ==
Grondona made his debut for the Argentina national rugby team in November 2020 during a historic victory against the All Blacks. This match marked Argentina's first-ever win over New Zealand.

In August 2023, Grondona suffered another ACL injury in a match against Spain, ruling him out of the 2023 Rugby World Cup.
