= Leonel Oviedo =

Argentine rugby union player

- Born: 16 February 1998 (age 28) Argentina
- Height: 186 cm (6 ft 1 in)
- Weight: 118 kg (260 lb; 18 st 8 lb)
- Notable relative: Joaquín Oviedo (brother)

Rugby union career
- Position: Hooker
- Current team: Force
Senior career
Years	Team	Apps	(Points)
2019	Jaguares XV		
2020	Ceibos		
2021–2022	Céret		
2022	Hyères	8	(0)
2023	Provence	3	(0)
2024	Peñarol		
2025	Dogos XV		
2026–	Force	4	(5)
- Correct as of 27 May 2026
International career
Years	Team	Apps	(Points)
2017–2018	Argentina U20	10	(5)
- Correct as of 22 January 2026

Leonel Oviedo (born 16 February 1998) is an Argentine rugby union player, who plays for the Force. His preferred position is hooker.

== Early career ==
Oviedo is Argentine born and plays his club rugby for Córdoba Athletic. He represented the Argentina U20 side in both 2017 and 2018. He is the brother of Argentina international rugby union player Joaquín Oviedo.

== Professional career ==
Oviedo first signed professionally with the Jaguares XV, representing them in the 2019 Currie Cup First Division. He then signed for Ceibos ahead of the 2020 Súper Liga Americana de Rugby season. Oviedo moved to France in 2021, spending the next two seasons representing Céret, Hyères, and then Provence in the Pro D2.

In 2024, he would return to South America, signing first with Peñarol for the 2024 Super Rugby Americas season, before signing for Dogos XV ahead of the 2025 season. He would move overseas again in 2026, signing for the Force ahead of the 2026 Super Rugby Pacific season.
