= Grégoire Arfeuil =

French rugby union player

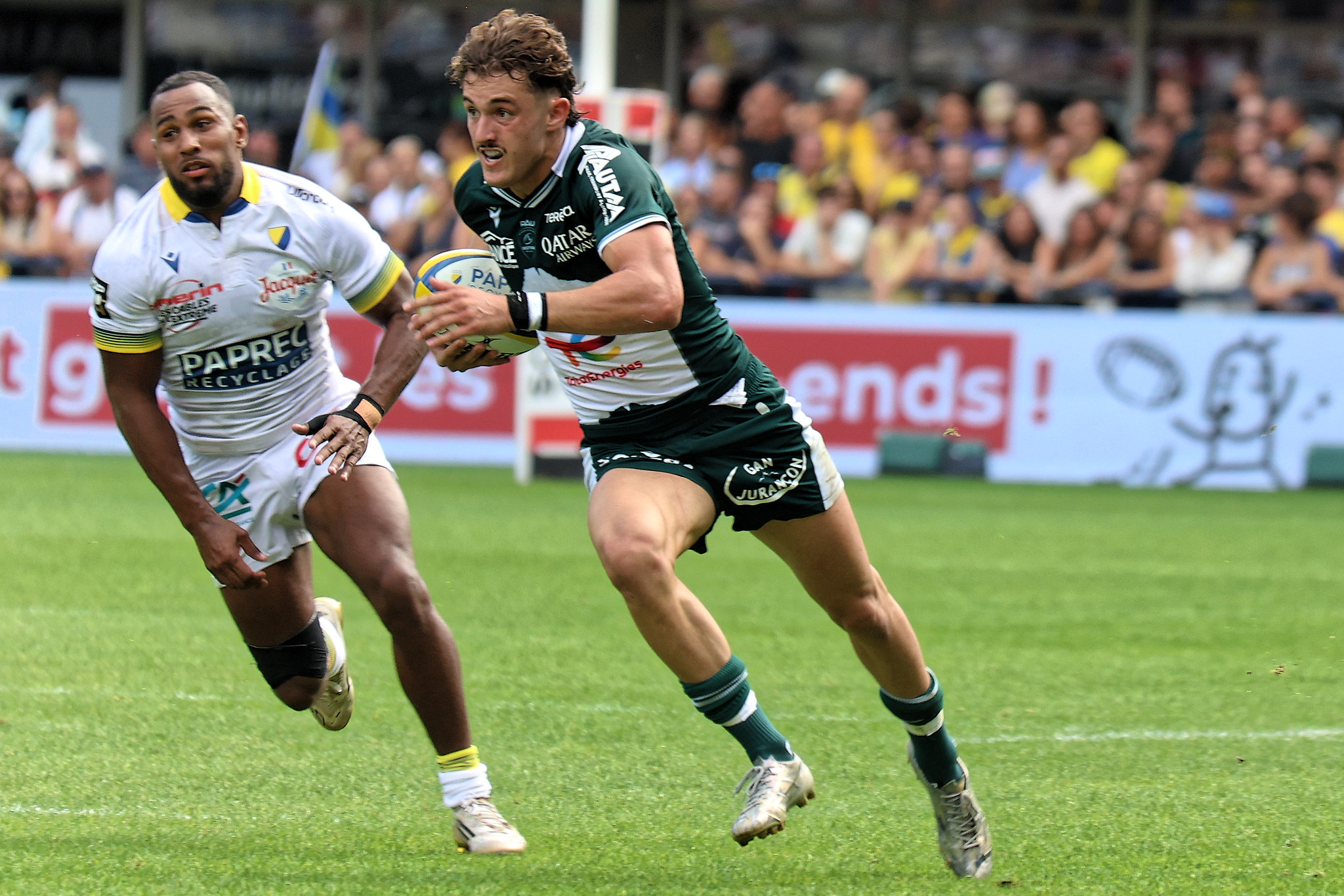
- Born: 5 December 2004 (age 21) Beaune, France
- Height: 1.94 m (6 ft 4 1/2 in)
- Weight: 90 kg (14 st 2 lb; 200 lb)

Rugby union career
- Position(s): Full-back, Wing
- Current team: Pau
Youth career
- 2014–2015: ARC Vitré
- 2015–2019: US Lectoure
- 2019–2020: SU Agen
- 2020–2021: US Lectoure
- 2021–: Pau
Senior career
Years	Team	Apps	(Points)
2023–	Pau	10	(15)
- Correct as of 13 October 2024
International career
Years	Team	Apps	(Points)
2024	France U20	1	(0)
- Correct as of 3 April 2024

Grégoire Arfeuil (born 5 December 2004) is a France rugby union player who plays as a full back for Pau in the Top 14 competition and the France national under-20 team. He made his Top 14 debut with his club on 25 August 2023.

== Playing career ==
Grégoire Arfeuil was born on December 5, 2004, in Beaune. He started playing rugby union in 2014 with the ARC Vitré. In 2015, he joined US Lectoure, then the academy of SU Agen in 2019. In 2020, he returned to Lectoure before joining Béarn and the academy of Section Paloise.

Arfeuil participated in the 2023–24 Six Nations Under 20s Championship. He debuted in the EPCR Challenge Cup for Section Paloise in 2022 against Dragons RFC.

== Honours ==
France

- 1x Six Nations Championship: 2026
