= Kavekini Boselawa =

Fijian rugby union player

- Full name: Kavekini Karl Boselawa
- Born: Macuata Province, Fiji
- Height: 193 cm (6 ft 4 in)
- Weight: 95 kg (209 lb; 14 st 13 lb)
- School: Sigatoka Methodist College
- University: Fiji National University

Rugby union career
- Position: Centre
- Current team: Drua
Senior career
Years	Team	Apps	(Points)
2027–	Drua	0	(0)
- Correct as of 12 November 2026
International career
Years	Team	Apps	(Points)
2026–	Fiji	1	(0)
- Correct as of 12 November 2026

Kavekini Boselawa is a Fijian rugby union player, who plays for the Drua. His preferred position is centre.

== Early career ==
Boselawa is from Naduri, Macuata Province and attended Sigatoka Methodist College. Originally a keen football player, he took up rugby aged nineteen while studying at Fiji National University. He plays his club rugby for Nadroga in the Skipper Cup. Boselawa has also taken part in modeling, 'walking' the PNG Fashion Runway in 2024.

== Professional career ==
In August 2026, Boselawa was announced as signing for the Drua, before later being named in their development squad for the 2027 Super Rugby Pacific season.

In October 2026, Boselawa was named in the Fiji squad for the fixture against Japan. He would debut for the side in the match, coming on as a replacement.
