= Nacani Boginisoko =

Fijian rugby union player

- Born: 28 June 2000 (age 26) Kadavu Island, Fiji
- Weight: 115 kg (254 lb; 18 st 2 lb)
- School: Cuvu College

Rugby union career
- Position: Wing
- Current team: Drua
Senior career
Years	Team	Apps	(Points)
2027–	Drua	0	(0)
- Correct as of 2 November 2026
International career
Years	Team	Apps	(Points)
2026–	Fiji	1	(0)
- Correct as of 2 November 2026
National sevens team
Years	Team		Comps
2026	Fiji		6
- Correct as of 2 November 2026

Nacani Boginisoko (born 28 June 2000) is a Fijian rugby union player, who plays for the Drua. His preferred position is wing.

== Early career ==
Boginisoko was born on Kadavu Island and attended Cuvu College. Having played rugby sevens for Dominion Brothers, and represents Nadi in the Skipper Cup.

== Professional career ==
Boginisoko's first professional experiences were for the Fiji Sevens side, who he represented on six occasions in 2026. In June 2026, Boginisoko was announced as signing for the Drua, before later being named in their squad for the 2027 Super Rugby Pacific season.

In October 2026, Boginisoko was named in the Fiji squad for the fixture against Japan. He would debut for the side in the match, starting on the wing.
