= Kenji Sato =

Kenji Sato may refer to:

- Kenji Sato (sociologist) (佐藤 健二, born 1957), Japanese professor in sociology
- Kenji Sato (basketball) (佐藤 賢次, born 1979), Japanese basketball player and coach
- Kenji Sato (baseball) (佐藤 賢治, born 1988), Japanese baseball player
