= Benjamín Grondona =

Argentine rugby union player

- Full name: Benjamín Grondona
- Born: 19 October 2003 (age 23) Buenos Aires, Argentina
- Height: 191 cm (6 ft 3 in)
- Weight: 105 kg (231 lb; 16 st 7 lb)
- Notable relative: Santiago Grondona (brother)

Rugby union career
- Position: Backrow
- Current team: Bristol Bears
Youth career
- 20??-2023: Club Champagnat
Senior career
Years	Team	Apps	(Points)
2023	Pampas XV	3	(0)
2024-	Bristol Bears	18	(5)
- Correct as of 8 April 2024
International career
Years	Team	Apps	(Points)
2023	Argentina under-20	3	(0)
2023	Argentina XV	2	(0)
- Correct as of 8 April 2024

Benjamín Grondona (born 19 October 2003) is an Argentine rugby union flanker who plays for Bristol Bears in the Premiership.

== Club career ==
He began his career at Club Champagnat, before joining the Pampas XV for the 2023 Super Rugby Americas season. In January 2024 he joined his brother at Bristol Bears in the Premiership. He made his Bristol Bears debut in a friendly against Bedford Blues, Head coach Pat Lam stated that "He was impressive. We are really excited about his future". On 27 March 2025, he signed an extension with the club.

== International career ==
He played for Argentina in the World Rugby U20 Championship. He played for the Argentina XV side in the 2023 Rugby World Cup warm-up matches coming off the bench against Uruguay and Chile.

== Statistics ==
Club Statistics
Club	Season	League			European Cup			Other Competitions		Friendlies		Total	
Club	Season	Division	Apps	Points	Division	Apps	Points	Apps	Points	Apps	Points	Apps	Points
Pampas XV	2023	Super Rugby Americas	3	0	-			0	0	0	0	3	0
Bristol Bears	2023-24	Premiership	1	0	Champions Cup	0	0	0	0	1	0	2	0
Bristol Bears	2024-25	Premiership	10	0	Champions Cup	2	0	4	5	0	0	16	5
Bristol Bears	Total		11	0	-	2	0	4	5	1	0	18	5
Career Total			14	0	-	2	0	4	5	1	0	21	5
