= Joe Brial =

Australian rugby union player

- Born: 7 January 2002 (age 24) Australia
- Height: 192 cm (6 ft 4 in)
- Weight: 109 kg (240 lb; 17 st 2 lb)

Rugby union career
- Position: Flanker / Number 8
- Current team: Reds, Canterbury
Senior career
| Years | Team | Apps | (Points) |
| 2022– | Canterbury | 4 | (0) |
| 2024– | Reds | 35 | (35) |
- Correct as of 6 June 2026
International career
| Years | Team | Apps | (Points) |
| 2025 | ANZAC XV | 1 | (0) |

Joe Brial (born 7 January 2002) is an Australian rugby union player, who plays for the Reds and Canterbury. His preferred position is flanker or number 8.

== Early career ==
Brial attended The Scots College in Sydney. He moved to New Zealand in 2020 to represent Canterbury academy. He has represented both the Junior Wallabies and New Zealand U20. He is the son of former Wallaby Michael Brial.

== Professional career ==
Brial has represented Canterbury in the National Provincial Championship since 2022, being named in the main squad for the 2023 Bunnings NPC. He signed for the Queensland Reds in September 2023. He was named in the Reds squad for the 2024 Super Rugby Pacific season. That year, he made his Super Rugby debut for the Queensland Reds, coming off the bench in the 73rd minute in their round 9 match against the Highlanders at Suncorp Stadium.
