= Juan Penoucos =

Argentine rugby union player (born 2004)

- Born: 29 June 2004 (age 22) Azul, Argentina
- Height: 191 cm (6 ft 3 in)
- Weight: 101 kg (223 lb; 15 st 13 lb)

Rugby union career
- Position: Flanker
- Current team: Pampas XV
Senior career
Years	Team	Apps	(Points)
2025–	Pampas XV		
- Correct as of 31 August 2026
International career
Years	Team	Apps	(Points)
2024	Argentina U20	7	(10)
2025	Argentina XV	1	(0)
2026–	Argentina	2	(0)
- Correct as of 31 August 2026

Juan Penoucos (born 29 June 2024) is an Argentine rugby union player, who plays for Pampas XV. His preferred position is flanker.

== Early career ==
Penoucous was born in Azul, Buenos Aires. He played his junior rugby for Belgrano Athletic Club and continues to play club rugby for them today. In 2024, he represented the Argentina U20 side.

== Professional career ==
Penoucos signed professionally with Pampas XV ahead of the 2025 Super Rugby Americas season. He was again named in the squad for the 2026 season.

Penoucous was named in the Argentina XV squad for their fixture against Romania in 2025. In July 2026, Penoucos was named in the Argentina squad for their upcoming tests. He made his debut on 8 August against South Africa, coming on as a replacement.
