= Kadin Pritchard =

Australian rugby union player

- Born: 29 July 2004 (age 22) New Zealand
- Height: 191 cm (6 ft 3 in)
- Weight: 96 kg (212 lb; 15 st 2 lb)
- School: St Peters Lutheran College
- Notable relative: Treyvon Pritchard (brother)

Rugby union career
- Position: Centre / Wing
- Current team: Brumbies
Senior career
Years	Team	Apps	(Points)
2025–	Brumbies	12	(5)
- Correct as of 3 May 2026
International career
Years	Team	Apps	(Points)
2024	Australia U20	5	(5)
- Correct as of 3 May 2026

Kadin Pritchard (born 29 July 2004) is an Australian rugby union player, who plays for the Brumbies. His preferred position is centre or wing.

== Early career ==
Born in New Zealand, Pritchard moved to Australia and attended St Peters Lutheran College while originally a member of the Queensland Reds academy. He moved to the ACT region after school representing the Brumbies development side and Gungahlin Eagles. He was named in the Australia U20 squad in 2024.

== Professional career ==
Pritchard was named in the Brumbies squad ahead of the 2025 Super Rugby Pacific season in November 2024. He made his debut in Round 1 of the season, coming on as a replacement against the Drua.
