= Nicolás D'Amorim =

Argentine rugby union player

- Born: 22 October 2000 (age 26) Argentina
- Height: 185 cm (6 ft 1 in)
- Weight: 100 kg (220 lb; 15 st 10 lb)

Rugby union career
- Position: Flanker
Senior career
Years	Team	Apps	(Points)
2022–	Pampas XV		
- Correct as of 21 December 2025
International career
Years	Team	Apps	(Points)
2025–	Argentina	1	(0)
- Correct as of 21 December 2025

Nicolás D'Amorim (born 22 October 2000) is an Argentine rugby union player. His preferred position is flanker.

== Early career ==
D'Amorim is from Argentina and plays his club rugby for the Hindú Club.

== Professional career ==
D'Amorim has been a member of the Pampas XV side since 2022. He represented the side in the 2022 Súper Liga Americana de Rugby season, and then helped the team to the semi-finals of the 2023 Super Rugby Americas season. He again represented the side in 2024 as they were losing finalists, before captaining the side in a number of fixtures in 2025.

D'Amorim was first called into the Argentina squad during the 2024 July tests. In August 2024, he made an appearance for the Argentina XV side against Chile. He would make his debut for Argentina against Uruguay in July 2025.
