= Samisoni Taukei'aho =

NZ international rugby union player

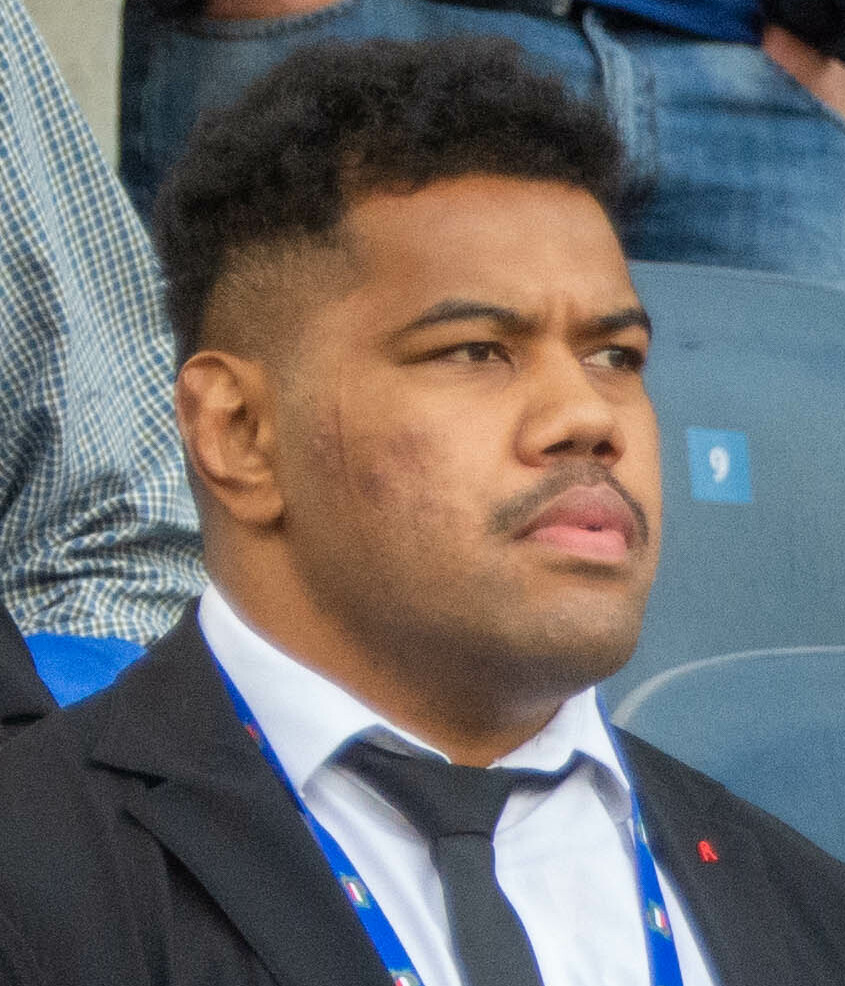
- Taukei'aho representing New Zealand during the November Internationals
- Full name: Samisoni Frank Simpson Taukei'aho
- Born: 8 August 1997 (age 29) Tongatapu, Tonga
- Height: 1.83 m (6 ft 0 in)
- Weight: 115 kg (254 lb; 18 st 2 lb)
- School: St. Paul's Collegiate School

Rugby union career
- Position: Hooker
- Current team: Waikato, Chiefs
Senior career
Years	Team	Apps	(Points)
2016–	Waikato	44	(100)
2017–	Chiefs	107	(110)
- Correct as of 18 August 2025
International career
Years	Team	Apps	(Points)
2021–	New Zealand	42	(65)
- Correct as of 18 August 2025
Medal record
Men's Rugby union
Representing New Zealand
Rugby World Cup
Silver medal – second place	2023 France	Squad

Samisoni Frank Simpson Taukei'aho (born 8 August 1997) is a professional rugby union player who plays as a hooker for Super Rugby club Chiefs. Born in Tonga, he represents New Zealand at international level after qualifying on residency grounds.

== Early life ==
Taukei'aho was first spotted while he toured New Zealand as captain of Tonga's under-15s team and in 2013 moved to St Paul's Collegiate in Hamilton on an internationals scholarship.

== International career ==
Taukei'aho made his international debut for the All Blacks on 17 July 2021 against Fiji at Hamilton.
