= Ryan McCarthy (rugby union) =

NZ rugby union player (born 1979)

- Born: Ryan McCarthy; 21 January 1979 (age 47) New Zealand
- Height: 5 ft 11 in (1.80 m)
- Weight: 14 st 1 lb (89 kg)
- Occupation: Secondary School Teacher

Rugby union career
- Position: Halfback
Amateur team(s)
Years	Team	Apps	(Points)
- [Southern Rugby Football Club (rugby)]
Senior career
Years	Team	Apps	(Points)
2008–2009	Steaua București Rugby		
Provincial / State sides
Years	Team	Apps	(Points)
2000–2005	North Otago	51	
2006–2007	Otago	2	(0)
Super Rugby
Years	Team	Apps	(Points)
2007	Highlanders	1	(0)

Ryan McCarthy (born 21 January 1979) is a retired New Zealand rugby union player.

== Playing career ==
McCarthy was a stalwart at halfback for North Otago in the early 2000s, earning 51 caps for the province and helping them to a Division 3 championship in 2002. After a stellar 2005 season in Division 2 during which he scored 6 tries and was named to the Divisional XV, he moved up to Otago for 2006, where he would struggle to get playing time behind Toby Morland and Chris Smylie.

With Smylie being drafted to the Hurricanes for the 2007 Super 14 season, McCarthy was included in the wider training group of the Highlanders as the side's 3rd halfback behind Jimmy Cowan and Morland, and was called into the squad to make a single substitute appearance during the season.

After playing club rugby in Auckland for Ponsonby Rugby Football Club in 2008, he spent a season playing for Steaua București Rugby in the Romanian Rugby Championship before retiring in 2009.

A PE teacher, McCarthy has become involved in competitive weightlifting since his retirement, winning a North Island championship in 2010.
