= Lachlan Shaw (rugby union) =

Australian rugby union player

- Born: 15 May 2003 (age 23) Brisbane, Australia
- Height: 200 cm (6 ft 7 in)
- Weight: 112 kg (247 lb; 17 st 9 lb)
- School: Brisbane Boys' College

Rugby union career
- Position: Lock
- Current team: Brumbies
Senior career
| Years | Team | Apps | (Points) |
| 2024– | Brumbies | 31 | (25) |
| 2024 | Manawatu | 10 | (0) |
- Correct as of 5 June 2026
International career
| Years | Team | Apps | (Points) |
| 2026– | Australia | 6 | (0) |
- Correct as of 10 October 2026

Lachlan Shaw (born 15 May 2003) is an Australian rugby union player, who plays for the Brumbies. His preferred position is lock.

== Early career ==
Shaw was born in Brisbane and attended Brisbane Boys' College, before playing his club rugby for University of Queensland. He moved to ACT in 2022 to join the Brumbies academy, and represented Gungahlin Eagles. He was named in the Junior Wallabies side in 2023.

== Professional career ==
=== ACT Brumbies ===
==== 2024-2025 ====
Shaw was named in the Brumbies squad ahead of the 2024 Super Rugby Pacific season. He made his debut in Round 3 of the season against the Force. He then signed for New Zealand's Manawatu Turbos in the 2024 Bunnings NPC. Shaw played in all 10 matches during the regular season.

Shaw started in the Brumbies' opening match of the 2025 Super Rugby Pacific season, a 36–32 victory over the Fijian Drua, before making substitute appearances in losses to the Western Force and Chiefs. On 6 March 2025, he signed a two-year contract extension with the Brumbies, committing to the club until the end of the 2027 season. Shaw subsequently appeared in all 16 of the Brumbies' matches during the 2025 season, making 6 starts and establishing himself as a regular member of the squad.

== International career ==
In June 2026, Shaw was selected in Joe Schmidt's 37-player Australia squad for the July Nations Championship. On 4 July 2026, he made his international debut in the Wallabies' opening Test against Ireland, coming on as a substitute for Josh Canham in the 58th minute. It was a tough debut for Shaw, who received a yellow card in the 75th minute as Australia went on to lose the match 33–31.
