= Bond Pirates Rugby Club =

Australian rugby union football club

- Full name: Bond Pirates Rugby Club
- Union: Queensland Rugby Union
- Branch: Queensland Country; Gold Coast D.R.U.
- Founded: 1996
- Location: Miami, Queensland
- Ground(s): Pizzey Park
- President: John Cameron
- League(s): Gold Coast and Districts Rugby Union
- 2004: 1st

Official website
- bondpirates.com.au

The Bond Pirates Rugby Club is an Australian rugby union football club that competes in the Gold Coast and District Rugby Union competition. The club is based at Pizzey Park, in Miami on Queensland's Gold Coast.

== History ==
The Bond Pirates are an amalgamation of two early GCDRU clubs, the Pirates and Bond University. The original Bond University club was based on the same field as the current one, but relations with the university were never good, and a permanent club house and change rooms were never made available. The Pirates were a loosely affiliated bunch of rugby enthusiasts with no fixed home ground who would often cobble together a team on a Saturday morning. Eventually, the two clubs, realising that something had to change in order for each to survive, agreed to combine. Initially the newly formed club remained at Bond University, but with tensions increasing over vehicle access, noise, ground and facility maintenance, and a raft of other issues, the decision was made to look for a new home. Eventually a deal was struck with the Gold Coast City Council to take over a recently vacated club house at the back of the Miami tip, in the Pizzey Park sports complex. That ground remains the home of the Bond Pirates to this day. In the years since the amalgamation, the club has played in, and lost, three first grade grand finals. 1998, 2004 and 2015. So despite winning several junior, colts and lower grade premierships, the elusive first grade flag has yet to be captured by the club. Quite a number of junior players have gone on to play Colts at the Bond University Club, which competes in the Queensland Premier League based in Brisbane.

== Notable former players ==
- James Slipper
- Tai McIsaac
- Zane Nonggorr

Sam Kaletta

John Clarke

Ben Daley

Sam Norton-Knight

== See also ==
- Sports on the Gold Coast, Queensland
- Rugby union in Queensland
- List of Australian rugby union teams
