= Hamish Stewart =

Australia international rugby union player

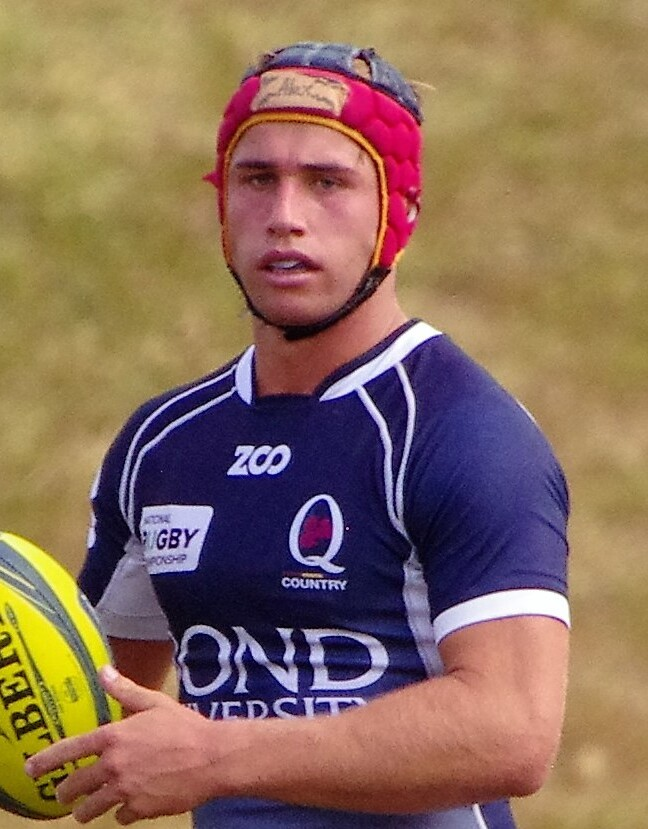
- Stewart with Queensland Country in 2017
- Born: 3 March 1998 (age 28) Toowoomba, Queensland, Australia
- Height: 183 cm (6 ft 0 in)
- Weight: 93 kg (14 st 9 lb; 205 lb)
- School: Toowoomba Grammar School
- University: Bond University

Rugby union career
- Position(s): Centre, Fly-half, Fullback
- Current team: Western Force
Youth career
- 2008: Toowoomba Bears Rugby Club
- 2005–2015: Toowoomba Grammar School
- 2016–2017: Reds Academy
Amateur team(s)
| Years | Team | Apps | (Points) |
| 2016–2019 | Bond University | | |
| 2020–2022 | Brothers | | |
Senior career
| Years | Team | Apps | (Points) |
| 2017–2019 | Queensland Country | 26 | (103) |
- Correct as of 12 October 2019
Super Rugby
| Years | Team | Apps | (Points) |
| 2017–2022 | Queensland Reds | 72 | (47) |
| 2023– | Western Force | 55 | (22) |
- Correct as of 30 May 2026
International career
| Years | Team | Apps | (Points) |
| 2016–2017 | Australia U20 | 8 | (5) |
| 2022–2024 | Australia A | 3 | (5) |
| 2024– | Australia | 4 | (0) |
- Correct as of 8 September 2024

Hamish Stewart (born 3 March 1998) is an Australian rugby union player who plays for the Perth-based Western Force in the Super Rugby as a centre. Stewart came through the Reds Academy after playing junior rugby for the Toowoomba Bears Rugby Club and Toowoomba Grammar School. Stewart has played club rugby for Bond University and Brothers in Brisbane's Premier Rugby competition, as well as Queensland Country in the former National Rugby Championship (NRC). Stewart made his Super Rugby debut for the Queensland Reds in 2017 and played a total of six seasons for the team between 2017 and 2022.

== Early life ==
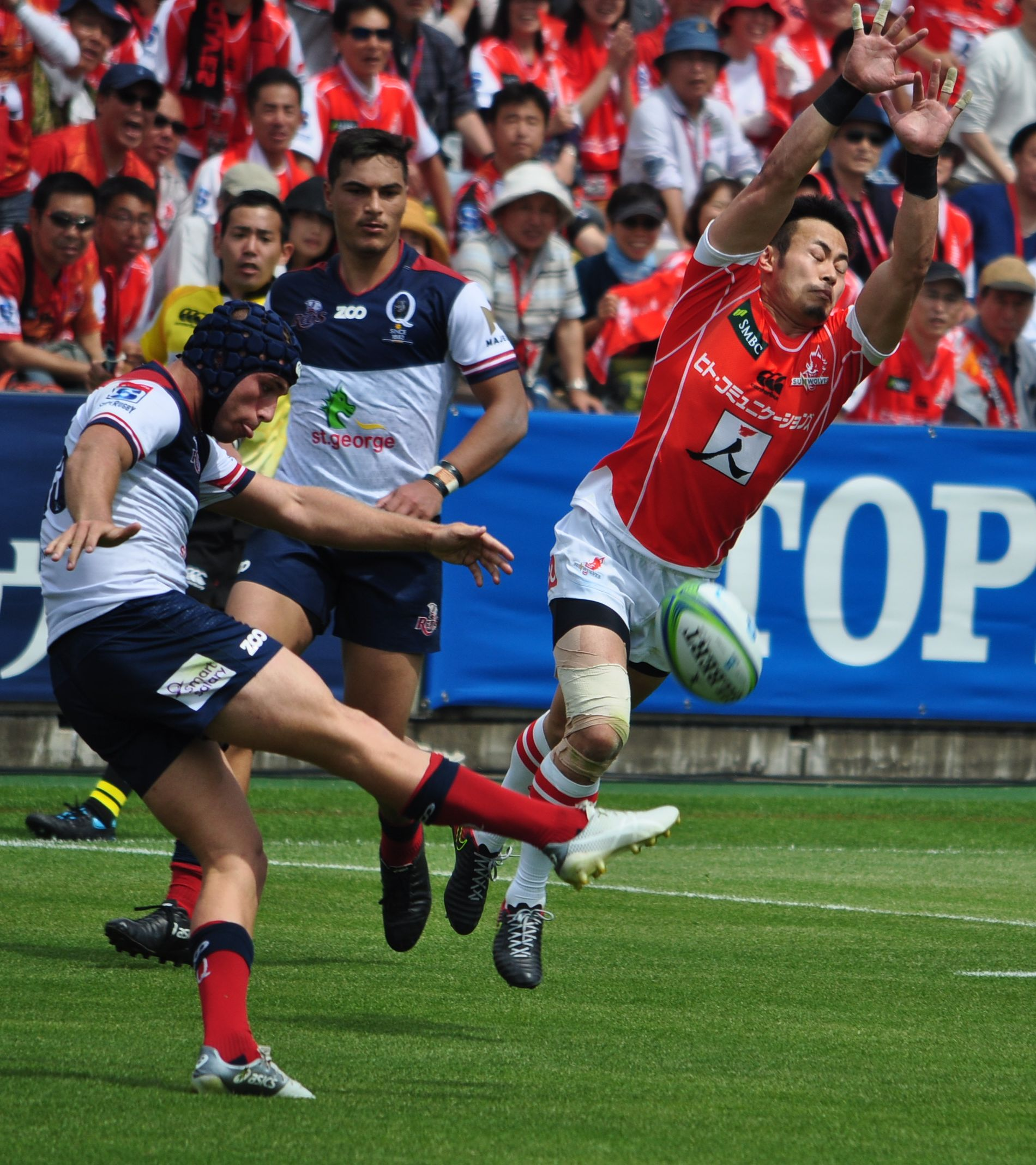
Stewart making a clearance kick for the Queensland Reds against the Sunwolves in Round 13 of the 2018 Super Rugby season.

Stewart was born in Toowoomba, in the Darling Downs region of Queensland, Australia. He grew up on a horse farm on the outskirts of Toowoomba where he was educated at Toowoomba Grammar School before moving to the Gold Coast to study at Bond University.

== Career ==
=== Queensland Reds ===
On the Gold Coast, Stewart played for the Bond University Rugby Club and later joined the Queensland Reds senior team the following season. Having been named in the Queensland Reds squad against the Hurricanes in the sixth round of the 2017 Super Rugby season, Stewart made his debut the following round against the Brumbies in Canberra. Stewart came off the bench, replacing fly-half Jake McIntyre in the seventy-third minute. Stewart played a total of six seasons with the Reds, scoring forty-seven points (including six tries) in seventy-two matches.

=== Western Force ===
He signed a two-year deal to play for the Western Force on 5 August 2022. His main positions are fly-half. On 8 May 2021, he celebrated the first title in a decade for the Queensland Reds when he played at inside centre in the 2021 Super Rugby AU Final at Lang Park. Stewart made seven tackles in the midfield and played solidly for the full eighty minutes in the 19–16 victory over the ACT Brumbies in front of 41,637 fans. He is highly regarded for his stout and fearless defence and work over the ball which is a throwback to starting out as a schoolboy flanker. A versatile contributor, he has a smart running and passing game. In 2022, he was recognised with selection for Australia A in games against Samoa, Tonga and Japan (two). He previously represented Australia in the national under 20s team. In 2017, he started at fly-half in the Queensland Country side that beat the Canberra Vikings 42–28 in Canberra to win the final of the 2017 National Rugby Championship.

In August 2025 Stewart signed a new two-year deal with the Western Force, which would run until the end of 2027.

== International career ==
In June 2022, Stewart was selected in the Australia A squad ahead of the 2022 Pacific Nations Cup. Stewart started in the first match of the tournament against Samoa. He was involved in the teams second try scored by scrum-half Ryan Lonergan, after offloading the ball to Lalakai Foketi in the teams own half whom offloaded to Lonergan for a try. Stewart played again for Australia A in their third and final fixture of the tournament against Tonga, coming on as a 40th-minute substitute. Australia A finished the tournament with two wins and loss, and second overall.

Stewart was named in the first Australia squad announcement for the 2024 Rugby Championship in August 2024. Stewart was not named in any matchday squad until their Round 3 matchup against Argentina. Stewart made his international debut against Argentina on 31 August 2024, starting the match at inside centre (No. 12) and played the full 80 minutes. Australia won 20–19 in La Plata. Stewart started in their second match against Argentina, playing the full duration of the match. Australia record a historic defeat to Argentina 67–27. Just months later, Stewart was called up to the Australia A squad on their tour of England alongside the Wallabies' Grand Slam tour. Surprisingly, Stewart played fly-half for Australia A against the Bristol Bears at Ashton Gate which finished in a 10–10 draw. Stewart started the teams next match against England A, losing 38–17 at the Twickenham Stoop.

In August 2025, Stewart was called up to the Wallabies squad in South Africa as injury cover after their first fixture in the 2025 Rugby Championship.

== Statistics ==
As of 24 May 2025; Super Rugby statistics only.

Hamish Stewart career Super Rugby statistics
| Team | Competition | Season | Matches | Starts | Sub. | Min. | Tries | Con. | Pen. | Drop. | Points | (yellow card) Yel. | (red card) Red |
|---|---|---|---|---|---|---|---|---|---|---|---|---|---|
| Queensland Reds | Super Rugby | 2017 | 5 | 0 | 5 | 105 | 1 | 0 | 0 | 0 | 5 | 0 | 0 |
| Queensland Reds | Super Rugby | 2018 | 13 | 8 | 5 | 650 | 1 | 2 | 0 | 0 | 9 | 0 | 0 |
| Queensland Reds | Super Rugby | 2019 | 10 | 10 | 0 | 702 | 0 | 5 | 1 | 0 | 13 | 0 | 0 |
| Queensland Reds | Super Rugby | 2020 | 7 | 6 | 1 | 464 | 1 | 0 | 0 | 0 | 5 | 0 | 0 |
| Queensland Reds | Super Rugby | 2020 (AU) | 10 | 10 | 0 | 721 | 1 | 0 | 0 | 0 | 5 | 1 | 0 |
| Queensland Reds | Super Rugby | 2021 (AU) | 8 | 6 | 2 | 484 | 0 | 0 | 0 | 0 | 0 | 0 | 0 |
| Queensland Reds | Super Rugby | 2021 (TT) | 4 | 3 | 0 | 221 | 0 | 0 | 0 | 0 | 0 | 0 | 0 |
| Queensland Reds | Super Rugby | 2022 | 15 | 14 | 1 | 1,150 | 2 | 0 | 0 | 0 | 10 | 0 | 0 |
| Queensland Reds Total | | | 72 | 57 | 14 | 4,497 | 6 | 7 | 1 | 0 | 47 | 1 | 0 |
| Western Force | Super Rugby | 2023 | 14 | 14 | 0 | 977 | 1 | 1 | 0 | 0 | 7 | 1 | 0 |
| Western Force | Super Rugby | 2024 | 14 | 14 | 0 | 1,066 | 1 | 0 | 0 | 0 | 5 | 2 | 0 |
| Western Force | Super Rugby | 2025 | 12 | 12 | 0 | 953 | 1 | 0 | 0 | 0 | 5 | 0 | 0 |
| Western Force Total | | | 40 | 40 | 0 | 2,996 | 3 | 1 | 0 | 0 | 17 | 3 | 0 |
| Career total | | | 112 | 97 | 14 | 7,493 | 9 | 8 | 1 | 0 | 64 | 4 | 0 |
