= Tabai Matson =

Fiji & NZ international rugby union player

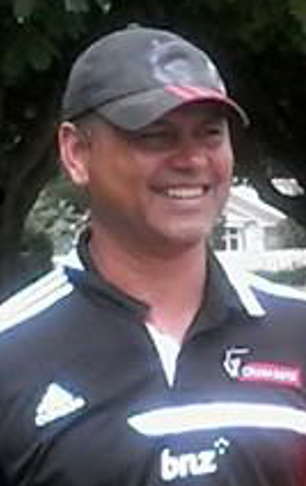
- Matson in 2015
- Born: John Tabaiwalu Fakavale Matson; 14 May 1973 (age 53) Nausori Highlands, Fiji
- Height: 1.92 m (6 ft 4 in)
- Weight: 104 kg (16 st 5 lb; 229 lb)
- School: Christ's College
- University: Lincoln University
- Occupation: Professional Rugby Coach

Rugby union career
- Position: Centre
Senior career
Years	Team	Apps	(Points)
1998–2000	CA Brive		
2000–01	London Irish		
2001–06	Yamaha Júbilo		
Provincial / State sides
Years	Team	Apps	(Points)
1994–97	Canterbury	56	(145)
Super Rugby
Years	Team	Apps	(Points)
1996–98	Crusaders	25	(30)
International career
Years	Team	Apps	(Points)
1995–96	New Zealand	5	(0)
1999	Fiji	2	(0)
Coaching career
- Years: Team
- 2005–06: Yamaha Júbilo
- 2006: University of Queensland (Assistant)
- 2007–08: Gold Coast Breakers
- 2009–11: Canterbury (Assistant)
- 2012: Canterbury Head Coach
- 2013–2016: Crusaders (Assistant)
- 2015: Fiji (Attack)
- 2016–2017: Bath
- 2018–2021: Chiefs (Assistant)
- 2021–2024: Harlequins
- 2024–: Black Rams Tokyo

John Tabaiwalu Fakavale Matson (born 14 May 1973) is a New Zealand rugby union coach and a former New Zealand and Fiji rugby union representative. He is currently head coach at Japan Rugby League One side Black Rams Tokyo.

== Education ==
Matson attended Nelson College from 1985 to 1986, before completing his secondary education at Christ's College in Christchurch.

== Playing career ==
A centre, Matson represented Canterbury at a provincial level and the Crusaders in Super Rugby. He was a member of the New Zealand national side, the All Blacks, in 1995 and 1996, playing 5 matches but no internationals. He played two matches for Fiji at the 1999 Rugby World Cup.

== Coaching career ==
Matson formally played and coached Yamaha Júbilo in his final three seasons for the club. He went on to become assistant coach and player at the University of Queensland before becoming head coach of the Gold Coast Breakers in 2007.

In 2009, he helped to revive the senior rugby programme of the oldest rugby club on the Gold Coast, the Gold Coast Eagles, as the Director of Rugby and head coach of the first grade team. That team went on to win the Gold Coast and District Rugby Union senior club competition (in his absence as he joined Canterbury as an assistant near the end of the season).

He returned to New Zealand in 2009 as Canterbury assistant coach, before being promoted to head coach in 2012. He led Canterbury to their fifth consecutive ITM Cup title by winning the 2012 ITM Cup.

In 2012 he was hired by the Brazil Rugby Federation as a consultant as they began their journey towards the 2016 Rio Olympics. He was focused on staging a training camp for the National Men's 15-a-side team and the Women's 7's team.

Matson was also the first non-Māori to coach the Māori All Blacks, assisting Head Coach Colin Cooper from 2013 to 2015.

After coaching the Māori All Blacks in their test victory against the Flying Fijians in June 2015, he joined Fiji's coaching staff from the Pacific Nations Cup in Vancouver – which they went on to win – through to the 2015 Rugby World Cup.

Matson was an assistant coach for the 3 years for the Crusaders in the Super Rugby competition. He has held both Attack and Defence roles for them during his time and is a specialist backs coach. His departure was announced in September 2020.

He joined Premiership Rugby side Harlequins as a senior coach ahead of the 2021–22 season. The previous season the club had won the league title. That season, he guided them to the semi-final playoff for the league campaign, losing to Saracens away in the semi-final playoff. The following season they finished sixth. After two seasons, he left his coaching role at the club to become performance director overseeing both the men's and women's sides. In March 2023, it was announced he would depart the club at the end of the 2023-24 season.

In August 2024, following his stint at Harlequins he joined Japan Rugby League One side Black Rams Tokyo as head coach.
