= Nerang Bulls RUC =

Australian rugby union club, based in Gold Coast, QLD

Nerang Bulls Rugby Union Football Club
- Full name: Nerang Bulls Rugby Union Football Club
- Union: Queensland Rugby Union
- Branch: Queensland Country; Gold Coast D.R.U.
- Founded: 1983; 43 years ago
- Location: Nerang, Queensland
- Ground: Glennon Park
- President: Jacinta Smith
- Coach: Te Ari Mahuri
- League: Queensland Premier Rugby
- 2024: 1st

Official website
- www.nerangbulls.com.au

The Nerang Bulls Rugby Union Football Club is an Australian rugby union football club that competes in the Gold Coast and District Rugby Union competition. The club is based in Nerang, Queensland on Queensland's Gold Coast.

== History ==
In 1983, the Nerang Bulls Rugby Union Club was formed and were located at Carrara oval. During 1983, the Bulls fielded one senior team and in 1984 they fielded two senior teams. The club spent two seasons at Carrara before moving to Glennon Park in Nerang in 1985.

== See also ==
- Sports on the Gold Coast, Queensland
- Rugby union in Queensland
- List of Australian rugby union teams
