= Palm Beach Currumbin Alleygators RUC =

Australian rugby union club, based in Gold Coast, QLD

Palm Beach Currumbin Alleygators Rugby Union Football Club
- Full name: Palm Beach Currumbin Alleygators Rugby Union Football Club
- Union: Queensland Rugby Union
- Branch: Queensland Country; Gold Coast D.R.U.
- Founded: 1980; 46 years ago
- Location: Currumbin Waters, Queensland
- League: Queensland Premier Rugby
- 1st Grade: 1984, 1988, 1991, 1994, 1999, 2002, 2003, 2005, 2011, 2012. 2nd Grade: 1981, 1990, 1994, 1999, 2003, 2004, 2006, 2025: 1st

Official website
- alleygators.com.au

The Palm Beach Currumbin Alleygators Rugby Union Football Club, alternatively shortened to PBC Alleygators, or PBCRUC, is an Australian rugby union football club that competes in the Gold Coast and District Rugby Union competition. The club is based in Palm Beach and Currumbin on Queensland's Gold Coast. The club's name is a play on Currumbin Alley

== See also ==
- Sports on the Gold Coast, Queensland
- Rugby union in Queensland
- List of Australian rugby union teams
