= Sunshine Coast Stingrays =

Australian rugby union club, based in Kawana Waters, QLD

- Full name: Sunshine Coast Stingrays
- Union: Queensland Rugby Union
- Branch: Queensland Country; Sunshine Coast R.U.
- Nickname: Rays
- Founded: 2005; 21 years ago
- Location: Kawana Waters
- Region: Sunshine Coast
- Ground: Stockland Park (Capacity: 12,000)
- League: Queensland Country Championships
Team kit

Official website
- www.scru.com.au

The Sunshine Coast Stingrays is an Australian rugby union football team that represents Queensland's Sunshine Coast region. The Stingrays played in the Queensland Premier Rugby competition from 2005 to 2013, but now focus on competing in the Queensland Country Championships.

The Stingrays played in the Grand Final in their sixth season in the Premier Rugby competition in 2010. However, after facing funding difficulties in 2013, the Sunshine Coast Rugby Union decided not to compete in the 2014 season.

== Season results ==
Queensland Premier Rugby (2005–2013)

- 2005 10th (5 competition points)
- 2006 10th (12 competition points)
- 2007 10th (16 competition points)
- 2008 8th (25 competition points)
- 2009 9th (20 competition points)
- 2010 4th (52 competition points) - GRAND FINALIST
- 2011 8th (25 competition points)
- 2012 10th (5 competition points)
- 2013 10th (6 competition points)

Queensland Country Championships (11 QCRU Sub-Unions)

- 2010 Champion (undefeated)
- 2004 Champion
- 1998 Runner-up
- 1997 Runner-up

== Premiership finals results ==
Queensland Premier Rugby (2005–2013)

- Premiers (Hospital Challenge Cup)
  - NIL
- Runners-up (Vince Nicholls Memorial Trophy)
  - 2010 Qld University 19-11 Sunshine Coast

Queensland Country Championships (1996–2010)

- Champions
  - 2010 Sunshine Coast 37–12 Gold Coast
  - 2004 Sunshine Coast def. Cairns
- Runners-up
  - 1997 Townsville 17–13 Sunshine Coast
  - 1996 Townsville 15–13 Sunshine Coast

== Internationals ==
Internationals selected whilst playing for the Stingrays

- Will Genia

Internationals selected whilst playing for another Club

- Mike Hercus, U.S.A. (2009)
- Toutai Kefu, Australia. (2010)
- Morgan Turinui, Australia. (2010)
- Caleb Ralph, New Zealand. (2010)

== See also ==
- Rugby union in Queensland
- Sunshine Coast Rugby Union

== Sources ==
- Purcell, Andy (2002). "120 Years of Country Rugby 1882-2002" (PDF). Queensland Rugby. Archived from the original (PDF 0.2 MB) on 20 May 2014.
