= Surfers Paradise Dolphins =

Australian rugby union club, based in Gold Coast

Surfers Paradise Dolphins Rugby Football Club
- Full name: Surfers Paradise Dolphins Rugby Union Football Club
- Union: Queensland Rugby Union
- Branch: Queensland Country; Gold Coast D.R.U.
- Founded: 1973; 53 years ago
- Location: Broadbeach Waters, Queensland
- Ground: Albert Park
- President: Don Jolly
- League: Queensland Premier Rugby
- 2016: 1st

Official website
- www.spruc.com.au

The Surfers Paradise Dolphins Rugby Football Club is an Australian rugby union football club that competes in the Gold Coast and District Rugby Union competition. The club is based in Broadbeach Waters, Queensland on Queensland's Gold Coast.

== History ==
In 1973, Col Macdonald and Barry Moon proposed the establishment of a second club on the Gold Coast, and the Surfers Paradise Dolphins club was founded in 1974. Coached by ex-Wallaby Alan Ware, the Surfers Paradise club played their first home games on the grounds of The Southport School.

== See also ==
- Sports on the Gold Coast, Queensland
- Rugby union in Queensland
- List of Australian rugby union teams
