= Tai McIsaac =

- Born: Tai McIsaac; 19 March 1975 (age 51) Brisbane, Queensland, Australia
- Height: 178 cm (5 ft 10 in)
- Weight: 112 kg (17 st 9 lb)

Rugby union career
- Position: Hooker
- Current team
Senior career
Years	Team	Apps	(Points)
2000–05	Gold Coast Breakers		
2007	Perth Spirit		
2006–09	Wests-Subiaco		
Super Rugby
Years	Team	Apps	(Points)
2003–05	Queensland Reds	16	(0)
2006–09	Western Force	51	(5)
International career
Years	Team	Apps	(Points)
2006	Australia	8	(0)
2003	Australia A		
Coaching career
- Years: Team
- 2015: Perth Spirit
- 2011–14: Toyota Shokki

Tai McIsaac (born 19 March 1975, in Brisbane) is an Australian rugby union football coach, and a former professional player. He is currently the head coach of the Perth Spirit team in Australia's National Rugby Championship. McIsaac played as a hooker for the Western Force and Queensland Reds in the Super Rugby competition before retiring from playing in 2009.

== Career ==
Prior to rugby, McIsaac had been a National League water polo player and represented Australian water polo in the under-21 team. Although he eventually specialised as a hooker, McIsaac started out in rugby at the age of 23, playing as a prop. He began his rugby career at Bond Pirates in the Gold Coast District Rugby Union, later moving on to the Gold Coast Breakers in Queensland Premier Rugby. McIsaac's first professional contract was with the Queensland Reds in the Super 12 competition. He made his Super 12 debut in 2003 in a match against New Zealand team, the Crusaders. Also that year, McIsaac toured Japan with Australia A.

In 2005, he signed with the Western Force for their inaugural season in 2006. McIsaac made his debut for the Wallabies against England in 2006, and went on to claim 8 Test caps in that season. After four seasons at the Force, he retired from playing rugby in 2009.

McIsaac began his coaching career with Honda Heat in Japan for the 2009–10 season. McIsaac was head coach of the Toyota Industries Shuttles for several seasons until 2013–14. He then returned to Australia to take up an assistant coaching position at the Western Force in 2015. He was also appointed head coach of the Perth Spirit for the 2015 season of the National Rugby Championship.

He currently teaches at The Southport School (TSS) on the Gold Coast and coaches their First 15 team.
