= Queensland Country Championships =

Rugby union competition in Queensland, Australia

- Sport: Rugby union
- First season: 1902 Country Week 1996 Country Championships
- Country: Australia

The Queensland Country Championships, also known as the Graincorp Country Championship, is a rugby union competition for teams from regions of Queensland outside of Brisbane. The Queensland Country Rugby Union administers the competitions at Senior (open age) and Colts (under 19) levels. Eleven country sub-unions are grouped into three regional divisions in Northern, Central, and Southern Queensland for the championships.

== History ==
=== Beginnings: Country Week ===
The first Queensland rugby tournament was the Country Week carnival hosted by the QRU in 1902. Teams from Warwick, Toowoomba, Bundaberg, Maryborough, Ipswich and Gympie, travelled to Brisbane to take part in the matches. Combined regional teams also played off against each other for selection in the Country representative teams to play Brisbane's A and B sides. For the 1903 tournament, additional visiting teams were added from Mount Morgan, Rockhampton, Charters Towers, Townsville, and Ravenswood. Combined Country's first win over Brisbane came in 1908.

After 1908, the Country Week competitions became infrequent following the introduction of rugby league. Rugby union came to a halt when war began in 1914. The QRU was not re-established until 1928–29, after the game had lost a lot of ground and was no longer played much in the country parts of Queensland. Country rugby languished for many years, and did not really start to develop again until the 1960s. After the Queensland Country Rugby Union's founding in 1965, a new Queensland Country team was chosen. The next year, trials to select the team were played and, in 1968, the first Queensland Country Carnival was held.

=== Country Carnivals and revival: 1968 to 1982 ===
First held in 1968 at Ballymore in Brisbane, the Country Carnivals continued annually through to 1982.

=== Regional State Championships: 1983 to 1995 ===
In 1983, the country carnivals were replaced by a four-team regional State Championship which involved representative sides from Northern, Central, and Southern Queensland, as well as Brisbane competing for the XXXX Cup. The trophy itself had been introduced in 1978 but was previously contested by Brisbane clubs and teams from individual Queensland Country sub-unions including Gold Coast, Darling Downs and Rockhampton.

Under the new format, the four teams played in a round-robin with the top two sides advancing to the final but this was revised after three wins in a row to Brisbane. The XXXX Shield was introduced for country regional sides in 1986, who played each other home-and-away to win the Shield and the right to challenge Brisbane for the XXXX State Cup (the under-19 championships from 1985 to 1991, sponsored by Metropolitan Permanent and Mount Isa Mines, were also held under this format). In the Senior competition, Brisbane proved too strong for the other regions in the XXXX Cup, so the format was revised again after the 1987 season. A combined Queensland Country team challenged Brisbane in 1988 Cup and won, securing their first victory over Brisbane since 1978.

After the 1991 season and the end of the XXXX Shield, and region-based rugby with it, the Winfield Challenge, which had begun two seasons earlier in 1989, was the only competition open to senior representative teams from the country. The Winfield State Championship, as it became, was contested by clubs from Brisbane as well as by country sub-unions, however, and the competition was dominated by the Brisbane clubs. The country teams did not always get to compete against each other either, so there were no recognised Queensland Country regional (or sub-union) champions for the period from 1992 to 1995. The Shield winners from 1986 to 1991, however, were considered country regional champions, and the country regional XXXX Cup finalists from 1983 through to 1985 were also considered as de facto country regional champions.

=== Country Championship: 1996 to present ===
The Incitec Country Championship, for senior teams and colts began in 1996. Seven sub-unions entered the open age championship and nine entered the under 19 championship. Gold Coast teams won both competitions in the inaugural year. In 1997 the Country Championship was separated into divisions for Northern, Central, and Southern Queensland. Home and away matches were played within each division, with winners playing-off for the Country Championship. This format continued through to 2010 – although, for reasons of cost, in some years no under 19s finals were contested.

From 2011 onward, the three divisions remained, but teams representing each whole region were chosen to contest the championship. GrainCorp became the principal sponsor in 2014.

== Teams ==
The regional teams competing in the divisional stages of the 2014 championship were as follows:

North Queensland
Far North Qld
Mackay
Mt Isa
Townsville

Central Queensland
Central Highlands
Capricornia
Western Queensland
Wide Bay

South Queensland
Darling Downs
Gold Coast
Sunshine Coast

The Wide Bay team was reintroduced in 2011 and is selected from players in the Bundaberg and District Rugby Union, plus teams from Fraser Coast, Gympie, and South Burnett.

== Format ==
At the regional level, round-robin competitions are played amongst the sub-unions within each of the Northern, Central, and Southern divisions. Divisional champions in both Senior (open age) and Under 19 competitions are decided in each region. Representative sides for each of the three regions are then selected to play in the Country Championships.

Another simple round-robin competition is played to decide the Queensland Country Champions for both Senior (open age) and Under 19 competitions. The Queensland Country representative teams are then selected based on the players' performances in this final stage.

== Winners ==
=== Queensland Country Championships (since 1996) ===
Senior Championship (open age)

- 2018 - North Queensland
- 2017 - South Queensland
- 2016 - South Queensland
- 2015 - South Queensland
- 2014 - North Queensland
- 2013 - North Queensland
- 2012 - North Queensland
- 2011 - South Queensland

Senior Championship – for sub-union teams

- 2010 - Sunshine Coast (def. Gold Coast 37–12)
- 2009 - Gold Coast (runner-up: Townsville)
- 2008 - Gold Coast (runner-up: Cairns)
- 2007 - Gold Coast (runner-up: Cairns)
- 2006 - Gold Coast (runner-up: Eastern Downs)
- 2005 - Gold Coast (def. Cairns 22–7)
- 2004 - Sunshine Coast (runner-up: Cairns)
- 2003 - Regionals: Cairns, Central Highlands, D. Downs.
- 2002 - Townsville (def. Gold Coast 19–16)
- 2001 - Darling Downs (def. Townsville 24-12)
- 2000 - Rockhampton (def. Darling Downs 14-13)
- 1999 - Sunshine Coast (def. Townsville 19–16)
- 1998 - Townsville (def. Sunshine Coast 17–13)
- 1997 - Townsville (def. Sunshine Coast 14–13)
- 1996 - Gold Coast (def. Darling Downs 18–10)

Under 19 Championship

- 2018 - South Queensland
- 2017 - South Queensland
- 2016 - North Queensland
- 2015 - North Queensland
- 2014 - North Queensland
- 2013 - South Queensland
- 2012 - North Queensland
- 2011 - South Queensland

Under 19 Championship – for sub-union teams

- 2010 - Gold Coast (def. Sunshine Coast 45–29)
- 2009 -
- 2008 -
- 2007 -
- 2006 - Not contested
- 2005 - Townsville (def. Sunshine Coast 22–12)
- 2004 -
- 2003 - Regionals: Cairns, Darling Downs.
- 2002 - Townsville (def. Sunshine Coast 37–8)
- 2001 - Sunshine Coast (def. Townsville 17–8)
- 2000 - Darling Downs and Townsville (8–8 draw)
- 1999 - Cairns (def. Sunshine Coast 21–13)
- 1998 - Regionals only
- 1997 - Not contested
- 1996 - Gold Coast (def. Darling Downs 23–11)

=== Qld Regional State Championships (1983–1991) ===
Senior Championship (open age)

- 1991 – North Qld – XXXX Shield
- 1990 – North, Central, South Qld - XXXX Shield (Note: 1990 - Joint winners with the three regions; North, Central, and South Queensland recording one win each.)
- 1989 – North Qld – XXXX Shield
- 1988 – North Qld – XXXX Shield
- 1987 – North Qld – XXXX Shield
- 1986 – North Qld – XXXX Shield
- 1985 – North Qld – XXXX Cup finalist
- 1984 – North Qld – XXXX Cup finalist
- 1983 – South Qld – XXXX Cup finalist

Under 19

- 1991 – North Qld – MIM State Colts finalist
- 1990 – North Qld – MIM State Colts finalist
- 1989 – North Qld – MIM State Colts finalist
- 1988 – North Qld – Metway Shield finalist
- 1987 – South Qld – Metropolitan Cup finalist
- 1986 – South Qld – Metropolitan Cup finalist
- 1985 – Central Qld – State Colts (top regional side)

== See also ==
- Queensland Country (NRC team)
- Queensland Country Heelers
- Rugby union in Queensland

== Sources ==
- Purcell, Andy (2002). "120 Years of Country Rugby 1882-2002" (PDF 0.2 MB). Queensland Rugby. Archived (PDF) from the original on 20 May 2014.
- Horton, Peter (2009). "Rugby Union Football in the Land of the Wallabies, 1874-1949: same game, different ethos". The International Journal of the History of Sport. 26 (11): 1611–1629. doi:10.1080/09523360903169925.
