= Mackay Rugby Union =

Local rugby union competition

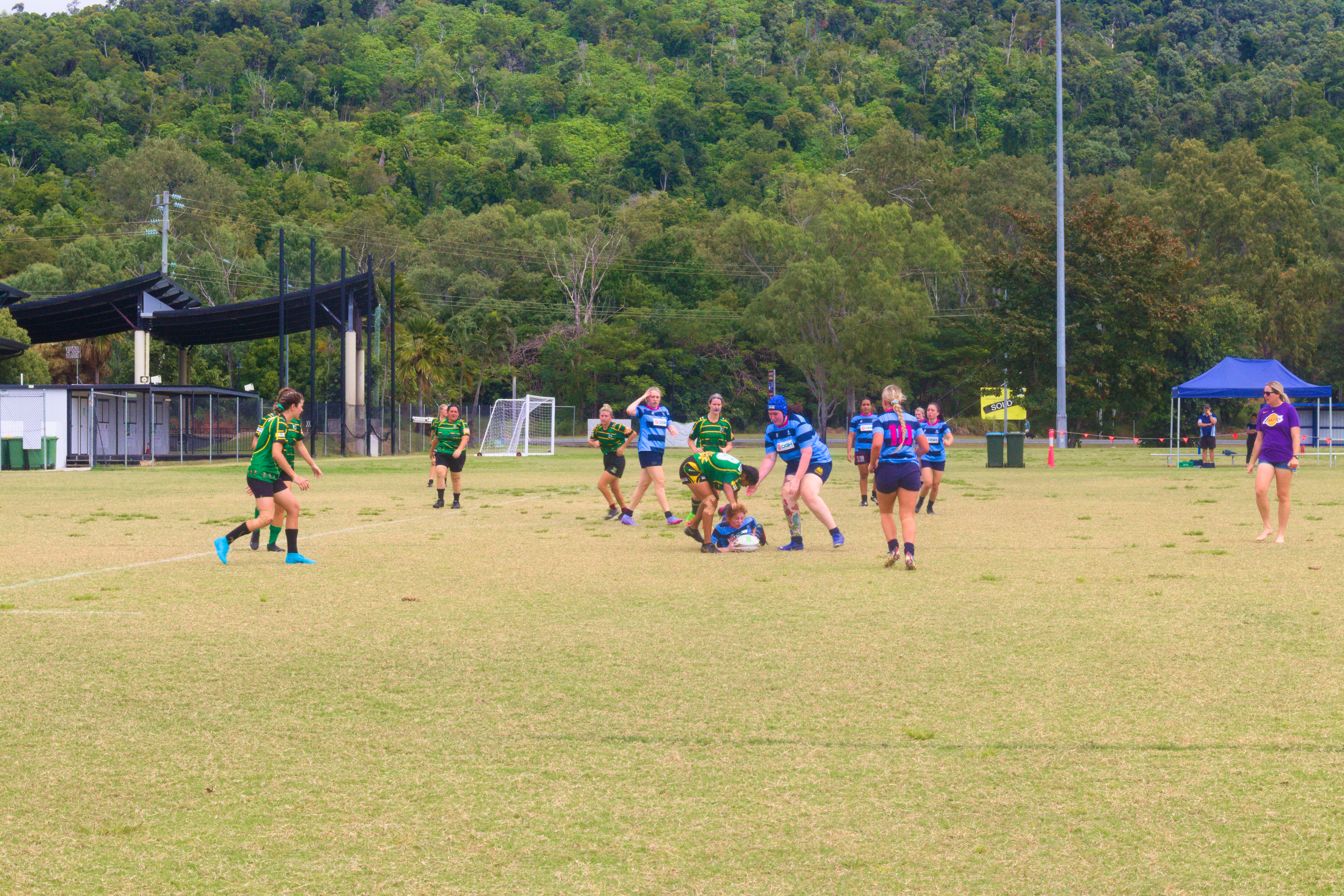
- Sport: Rugby Union
- Jurisdiction: Mackay, Queensland
- Abbreviation: MRU
- Affiliation: Queensland Rugby Union
- Regional affiliation: Queensland Country Rugby Union
- (Queensland)
- (Australia)

The Mackay Rugby Union is the local rugby union competition in the Mackay Region and Whitsunday Region in Queensland, Australia.

== History ==
Rugby Union in Mackay can be traced to as early as 1901.

== Current clubs ==
The clubs contesting the 2022 season are;

- Bowen
- Brothers
- Kuttabul
- Moranbah
- Mackay City
- Proserpine Whitsunday Raiders
- Slade Point

== See also ==
- Rugby union in Queensland
