= 1984 Fiji rugby union tour of Australia =

Summary
P	W	D	L
Total
8	6	0	2
Test match
0	0	0	0

The 1984 Fiji rugby union tour of Australia was a series of matches played between March and April 1984 by Fiji national rugby union team in Australia.

No test matches were played.

== Results ==
31 March 1984

Central Queensland	3–39	Fiji XV
	report

Gladstone
Referee: Col Waldron (Queensland)

4 April 1984

North Queensland	3–42	Fiji XV
	report

Hugh Street, Townsville
Referee: Chris Oxenford (Queensland)

7 April 1984

Queensland	15–19	Fiji XV
	report

Ballymore Stadium, Brisbane
Referee: Kerry Fitzgerald (Queensland)

10 April 1984

Queensland Country	10–21	Fiji XV
	report

Carrara, Gold Coast
Referee: Bernie Fienberg (Queensland)

12 April 1984

South Australia	17–65	Fiji XV
	report

Adelaide

14 April 1984

Victoria	8–42	Fiji XV
	report

Olympic Stadium, Melbourne
Referee: L. Smith (Victoria)

17 April 1984

New South Wales Country	43–0	Fiji XV
	report

Eric Weissel Oval, Wagga Wagga
Referee: Sandy McNeill (New South Wales)

21 April 1984

Sydney	38–14	Fiji XV
	report

Concord Oval, Sydney
Referee: B Kinsey (New South Wales)
