= Helensvale Hogs RUC =

Australian rugby union club, based in Gold Coast, Queensland

Helensvale Hogs Rugby Union Football Club
- Full name: Helensvale Hogs Rugby Union Football Club Formally known as the Helensvale Hares Rugby Union Football Club.
- Union: Queensland Rugby Union
- Branch: Queensland Country; Gold Coast D.R.U.
- Founded: 1987; 39 years ago
- Location: Helensvale, Queensland
- Ground(s): The Hog Pen. Rugby Lane, Helensvale
- President: Kurt Kinder (2022 - )
- League: Gold Coast District Rugby Union
- 2019: 1st

Official website
- www.helensvalerugby.com.au

The Helensvale Hogs Rugby Union Football Club is an Australian rugby union football club that competes in the Gold Coast and District Rugby Union competition. The club is based in Helensvale on Queensland's Gold Coast.

It is currently the number 1 community rugby club on the Gold Coast.

== See also ==
- Sports on the Gold Coast, Queensland
- Rugby union in Queensland
- List of Australian rugby union teams
