= Doughty Shield =

The Doughty Challenge Shield is a rugby union football trophy in Brisbane, Australia.

Named for businessman Hector R. Doughty, a former marine engineer with the Queensland Harbours and Rivers Department and lightweight champion boxer, the Doughty Shield was awarded to the Brisbane A Grade Rugby Union Premiers from 1931 to 1941.

The Doughty Shield was later resurrected as a First Grade knock-out competition from 1946 to 1951.

Since 1957, the shield has been awarded for the club championship in Brisbane, where selected teams from each club contributes to an overall points tally. In 2007, Premier Rugby (First Grade) was not included in calculations, but this change only lasted for one season. 5th Grade were included in the Doughty Shield calculations for the first time ever in 2013. As of 2020, the Club Championship is based on competition points won across 1st Grade to 5th Grade, Women and Colts 1 to Colts 3.

== List of "The Doughty Challenge Shield" Winners ==
Year
A GRADE PREMIERS (1931–41)
1931 University of Queensland Rugby Club
1932 University of Queensland Rugby Club
1933 YMCA Rugby Club
1934 University of Queensland Rugby Club
1935 Eagle Junction Rugby Club
1936 Eagle Junction Rugby Club
1937 Eagle Junction Rugby Club
1938 University of Queensland Rugby Club
1939 YMCA Rugby Club
1940 Eagle Junction Rugby Club
1941 University of Queensland Rugby Club
1st GRADE KNOCK-OUT COMPETITION WINNERS (1946–51)
1946 GPS Gallopers Rugby Club
1947 Eagle Junction Rugby Club
1948 Eagle Junction Rugby Club
1949 Brothers
1950 Brothers
1951 Brothers
BRISBANE CLUB CHAMPIONSHIP (1957–present)
1957 University of Queensland Rugby Club
1958 Souths Magpies Rugby Club
1959 University of Queensland Rugby Club
1960 University of Queensland Rugby Club
1961 University of Queensland Rugby Club
1962 University of Queensland Rugby Club
1963 University of Queensland Rugby Club
1964 University of Queensland Rugby Club
1965 University of Queensland Rugby Club
1966 University of Queensland Rugby Club
1967 University of Queensland Rugby Club
1968 University of Queensland Rugby Club
1969 University of Queensland Rugby Club
1970 Brothers
1971 Brothers
1972 University of Queensland Rugby Club
1973 Brothers
1974 Brothers
1975 GPS Gallopers Rugby Club
1976 GPS Gallopers Rugby Club
1977 Brothers
1978 University of Queensland Rugby Club
1979 Brothers
1980 Brothers
1981 Brothers
1982 Brothers
1983 Brothers
1984 Brothers
1985 Brothers
1986 Brothers
1987 Easts Tigers Rugby Club
1988 Souths Magpies Rugby Club
1989 Souths Magpies Rugby Club
1990 University of Queensland Rugby Club
1991 Brothers
1992 Souths Magpies Rugby Club
1993 Brothers
1994 Souths Magpies Rugby Club
1995 University of Queensland Rugby Club
1996 Brothers
1997 University of Queensland Rugby Club
1998 Wests Bulldogs Rugby Club
1999 Souths Magpies Rugby Club
2000 Wests Bulldogs Rugby Club
2001 University of Queensland Rugby Club
2002 Sunnybank Dragons Rugby Club
2003 Easts Tigers Rugby Club
2004 Easts Tigers Rugby Club
2005 Easts Tigers Rugby Club
2006 GPS Gallopers Rugby Club
2007 Sunnybank Dragons Rugby Club
2008 GPS Gallopers Rugby Club
2009 Easts Tigers Rugby Club
2010 University of Queensland Rugby Club
2011 University of Queensland Rugby Club
2012 University of Queensland Rugby Club
2013 University of Queensland Rugby Club
2014 University of Queensland Rugby Club
2015 University of Queensland Rugby Club
2016 University of Queensland Rugby Club
2017 University of Queensland Rugby Club
2018 Brothers
2019 Brothers
2020 Brothers & Easts Tigers Rugby Club
2021 Easts Tigers Rugby Club
2022 University of Queensland Rugby Club
2023 Brothers
2024 Brothers
2025 Wests Bulldogs Rugby Club
2026 Brothers

Club	Wins	First year	Last year
University of Queensland	27	1957	2022
Brothers	22	1970	2026
Easts Tigers	7	1987	2021
Souths Magpies	6	1958	1999
GPS Gallopers	4	1975	2008
Wests Bulldogs	3	1998	2025
Sunnybank Dragons	2	2002	2007
Norths Eagles	0		

== See also ==
- Queensland Premier Rugby
