= David Croft =

David Croft may refer to:

- David Croft (TV producer) (1922–2011), English writer, producer and actor
- David Croft (rugby union) (born 1979), Australian former rugby union player
- David Croft (broadcaster) (born 1970), English broadcaster for Sky Sports
- David Croft (Home and Away), a fictional character from the Australian soap opera Home and Away
