= Jordan Way =

Australian rugby union referee

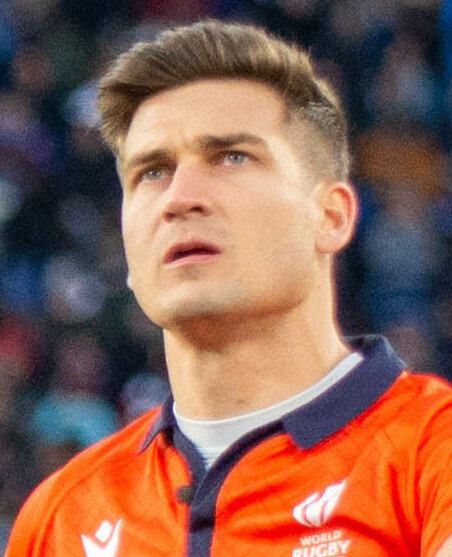
- Way during the 2023 Six Nations.
- Born: 1994 or 1995 (age 31–32)
- School: St Augustine's College, Cairns
- University: University of Queensland

Rugby union career
Youth career
- Barron Trinity Bulls
Refereeing career
| Years | Competition | Apps |
| 2015–2019 | National Rugby Championship | 16 |
| 2017–2023 | World Rugby Sevens Series | 30 (Note: These are not counted as matches but total events.) |
| 2018, 2022 | Commonwealth Games | |
| 2020– | Super Rugby | 24 |
| 2021, 2024 | Summer Olympics | |
| 2022– | Test matches | 6 |
| 2022 | Rugby World Cup Sevens | |
| 2023 | Rugby World Cup | |
| 2025– | National Provincial Championship | |
- Correct as of 26 October 2024

Jordan Way is an Australian professional rugby union referee. He played junior rugby union for the Barron Trinity Bulls before coming a referee in his youth.

== Refereeing career ==
Way was educated at St Augustine's College in the Far North Queensland town of Cairns, Australia. He played junior rugby union for the Barron Trinity Bulls in the Far North Queensland Rugby Union (FNQRU). After suffering a serious collarbone injury, Way took up refereeing. In 2013, he made his senior refereeing debut at 17-years-old in a FNQRU reserves grade match. Way was reportedly the first junior to come through the referee academy that was established by FNQRU in 2012. Cairns and District Rugby Referees Association head educator Bill Dentice praised Way, stating: "He's going to be refereeing Super Rugby one day, I have no doubt about that... He is just a prodigy, and I don't use that term lightly. His knowledge of the laws is second to none and his man[-]management is just light years ahead of what you would expect."

Since 2015, Way has been a member of Rugby Australia's (RA) match officials panel. Way officiated his first senior professional match on 17 October 2015, in a 2015 National Rugby Championship match between Brisbane City and the Greater Sydney Rams. Way officiated several more matches in the 2016 National Rugby Championship before becoming a permanent referee on the World Rugby Sevens Series in January 2017. His first event as a referee was the 2017 Wellington Sevens.

In 2020, following the COVID-19 pandemic causing the cancellation of the 2020 Super Rugby season and regional tournaments being created in its place, Way made his Super Rugby refereeing debut, having previously only been an assistant in Super Rugby, in the match between the Force and Reds on 21 August 2020 in the 2020 Super Rugby AU competition. He was appointed to the officiating list for the 2021 Super Rugby AU season in February 2021.
