= Paul Perrin =

Australian rugby union player (born 1940)

- Full name: Paul Douglas Perrin
- Born: 26 March 1940 (age 86) Pymble, Sydney, Australia

Rugby union career
- Position: Lock
International career
Years	Team	Apps	(Points)
1962	Australia	1	(0)

Paul Douglas Perrin (born 26 March 1940) is an Australian former rugby union international.

Perrin is the son of 1930s Wallabies number eight Tom Perrin. He was born in the Sydney suburb of Pymble and educated at The Southport School on the Gold Coast in Queensland.

A lock, Perrin played for the Brisbane-based GPS club and was capped once for the Wallabies, against the All Blacks at the Brisbane Exhibition Ground in 1962, with Rob Heming unavailable.

Perrin was the inaugural captain-coach of the Gold Coast Eagles in the Queensland Sub-District competition.

== See also ==
- List of Australia national rugby union players
