= James Slipper =

Australian rugby union player (born 1989)

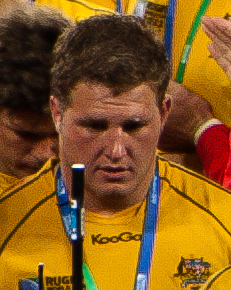
- Full name: James Alexander Slipper
- Born: 6 June 1989 (age 37) Gold Coast, Queensland, Australia
- Height: 1.85 m (6 ft 1 in)
- Weight: 117 kg (258 lb; 18 st 6 lb)
- School: The Southport School

Rugby union career
- Position: Prop
- Current team: ACT Brumbies
Senior career
Years	Team	Apps	(Points)
2010–2018	Queensland Reds	104	(25)
2014–2018	Queensland Country	5	(0)
2019–	ACT Brumbies	112	(25)
- Correct as of 5 June 2026
International career
Years	Team	Apps	(Points)
2007	Australia U18	3	(0)
2009	Australia U20	5	(0)
2010–2026	Australia	154	(20)
- Correct as of 18 July 2026
Coaching career
- Years: Team
- 2026–: Brumbies (SRA) (Scrum coach)
- Correct as of 10 September 2026
Medal record
Men's rugby union
Representing Australia
Rugby World Cup
Silver medal – second place	2015 England	Squad
Bronze medal – third place	2011 New Zealand	Squad

James Alexander Slipper (born 6 June 1989), nicknamed Slips and the Golden Slipper, is an Australian professional rugby union player who plays as a prop for Super Rugby club ACT Brumbies and the Australia national team. In September 2025, Slipper became Australia's most-capped player, reaching 150 appearances. On 20 March 2026, Slipper became the most-capped Super Rugby player, hitting 203 Super Rugby appearances in the ACT Brumbies' 33–24 win against the Chiefs.

== Early life ==
Slipper was born and raised on the Gold Coast, Queensland. He first played junior rugby for the Bond Pirates in the local Gold Coast competition, before dedicating his weekends to playing for The Southport School (TSS) in the prestigious GPS schools competition. He would take part in a golden generation for TSS which included back-to-back GPS premierships in 2006 and 2007 while also being chosen to represent the Australian Schoolboys team three times in international fixtures. Following graduation, he signed a contract with the Queensland Reds.

== Club career ==
In February 2010, Slipper made his Super Rugby debut for the Queensland Reds against the New South Wales Waratahs at Suncorp Stadium in Brisbane.

In the 2011 Super Rugby season, Slipper was a part of the championship winning Queensland Reds side.

On 16 January 2015, Slipper was appointed the new captain of the Queensland Reds, replacing James Horwill, who would be leaving the Reds at the end of the Super Rugby season to join English Premiership side Harlequin F.C.

In September 2018, the ACT Super Rugby team, the Brumbies, added James Slipper to their team for the 2019 Super Rugby season. He was a very positive addition to a successful season, with the Brumbies finishing on the top of the Australian conference. Slipper was said to add wisdom and depth to the team.

== International career ==
Slipper was named in the squad for the Australia A national rugby union team's two matches against England in June 2010.

On 12 June 2010, Slipper made his debut for the Australia national rugby union team against England at Perth. He was the 843rd player in history to represent Australia. He quickly became a regular for the national team, playing in all six of Australia's matches in the 2010 Tri Nations Series. Slipper featured in 13 of the Wallabies 14 tests during 2010.

Slipper was chosen in Australia's 30-man squad for the 2011 Rugby World Cup. He played in all of Australia's games during the tournament.

In August 2015, Slipper was named in the Wallabies 31-man squad for the 2015 Rugby World Cup in England.

On 5 September 2015, he captained the Wallabies to a 47–10 victory over the United States at Soldier Field in Chicago, as part of their preparations for the 2015 Rugby World Cup.

In August 2019, Slipper was named in the 31-man Wallabies squad for the 2019 Rugby World Cup in Japan.

In November 2020, Slipper won his 100th cap for the Wallabies in a 24–22 victory over the All Blacks at Suncorp Stadium in Brisbane.

In August 2023, Slipper was named in the 33-man Wallabies squad for the 2023 Rugby World Cup in France.

He won his 140th cap for the Wallabies in a 28–31 defeat to New Zealand on September 21st, 2024 at Accor Stadium in Sydney, overtaking George Gregan as the Wallabies' most capped player.

On 1 October 2025, Slipper called time on his international career after his 150th cap against New Zealand in the final round of the 2025 Rugby Championship.

In June 2026, Slipper reversed his retirement from international rugby after answering an SOS call from Wallabies coach Joe Schmidt following an injury crisis to other squad members. Slipper was named in the Wallabies squad for July's Nations Championship. On 18 July 2026, Slipper played his 154th test for the Wallabies in their 57-10 victory over Italy, becoming the second most-capped player in international rugby, surpassed only by Welsh lock Alun Wyn Jones.

== Coaching career ==
On 10 September 2026, the ACT Brumbies announced Slipper as the new scrum coach for the Brumbies Super Rugby AUS team ahead of the 2026 campaign.

== Honours ==
=== Queensland Reds ===
- Super Rugby: 2011

=== Australia ===
- The Rugby Championship: 2015
- Rugby World Cup third place: 2011; runner-up: 2015

Preceded by Michael Hooper	Australian national rugby union captain 2015–2024	Succeeded by Harry Wilson
