= Gold Coast and District Rugby Union =

Local rugby governing body in Australia

Gold Coast District Rugby Union
- Sport: Rugby Union
- Jurisdiction: Gold Coast, Australia
- Abbreviation: GCDRU
- Founded: 1964
- Affiliation: Queensland Rugby Union
- Regional affiliation: Queensland Country (1978)
- Headquarters: Albert Park, Broadbeach Waters

Official website
- www.gcdru.com.au
- (Queensland)

The Gold Coast and District Rugby Union, or GCDRU, is the local governing body for the sport of rugby union on Australia's Gold Coast. The GCRU runs a club rugby competition for men's teams with three senior grades, as well as a junior club competition that caters for teams grouped by age from under 6 to under 18 and Girls/Women's 7's on a Friday night.

Gold Coast representative teams play under the name "Cyclones" in a range of rugby competitions for senior and junior players. The Bond University Rugby Club plays in the Queensland Premier Rugby competition.

== History ==
The foundation club for rugby union on the Gold Coast was the Gold Coast Eagles. The club was registered with the Queensland Rugby Union (QRU) after a positive response at the initial foundation meeting in late 1964.

A meeting was called to be held at a downstairs room at the old Chevron Hotel. This meeting was attended by people such as Tom Perrin who had represented Australia both in Rugby Union and Rugby League, Nap Palmer, the brother of Brian Palmer the ex Australian Coach, Ken Hughes, Paul Perrin (son of Tom, who played for Australia against Japan and France)...

— Bob Sinclair, former Chairman of GCDRU, A Brief History, c. 1992.

The Gold Coast team's first season of rugby was in the 1965 Queensland Subbies competition, playing out of Rudd Park in Burleigh Heads. Coached by Paul Perrin and Bob Sinclair, the team went on to win the competition in 1965 and 1966, and finished second in 1967. In 1968, the QRU directed the Gold Coast to play in the Brisbane first grade competition. The team managed to defeat the eventual premiers GPS on their home ground but did not win any other matches for the season. This bad run of results and the logistics of traveling to Brisbane resulted in the Gold Coast team dropping out of all rugby competition in 1969. The club was reformed and rejoined Subbies in 1970.

In 1973, Col Macdonald and Barry Moon proposed the establishment of a second club on the Gold Coast, and the Surfers Paradise Dolphins club was founded in 1974. Coached by ex-Wallaby Alan Ware, the Surfers Paradise club played their first home games on the grounds of The Southport School.

In 1978 the Gold Coast and District Rugby Union affiliated with the Queensland Country Rugby Union.

Former logo, pre-2015.

== Clubs ==
Bond University Rugby Club competes in Queensland Premier Rugby.

Gold Coast clubs that play in the GCDRU senior grade competitions, as of 2014, are:

- Bond Pirates Rugby Club
- Coolangatta Tweed Barbarians
- Coomera Crushers RUC
- Gold Coast Eagles
- Griffith Uni Colleges Knights Rugby Union Club
- Helensvale Hogs RUC
- Hinterland Celtics Rugby Club
- Nerang Bulls RUC
- Palm Beach Currumbin Alleygators RUC
- Surfers Paradise Dolphins

Additional clubs with junior teams that play in the Gold Coast age-group competitions include:

- Beaudesert Warriors RUFC – also has a senior team in the Queensland Suburban Normanby Cup.
- Casuarina Beach Rugby Club – junior club with links to Hinterland Celtics.
- Tamborine Mountain Rugby Club
- Yatala Rams Junior Rugby Union Club

== Representative teams ==
Cyclones colours

The GCDRU selects representative teams each year which play under the name "Cyclones". The senior men's team and junior age-group teams compete in the annual Queensland Country Championships.

== See also ==
Rugby union in Queensland

== Sources ==
- Sinclair, Bob. "A Brief History". Gold Coast & District Rugby Union. Archived from the original on 28 February 2014.
- Purcell, Andy (2002). "120 Years of Country Rugby 1882-2002" (PDF). Queensland Rugby. Archived from the original (PDF 0.2 MB) on 20 May 2014.
