= Queensland Country Rugby Union =

Sports governing body in Queensland, Australia

- Sport: Rugby Union
- Jurisdiction: Queensland Regions (excluding Brisbane)
- Abbreviation: QCRU
- Founded: 1965 (61 years ago)
- Affiliation: Queensland Rugby Union
- President: Dan Morton

Official website
- redsrugby.com.au/GrassrootsRugby/Country

The Queensland Country Rugby Union, or QCRU, is the governing body for the sport of rugby union within most of the state of Queensland in Australia. It is affiliated with the Queensland Rugby Union.

The Queensland Country Rugby Union administers the game in regions of Queensland outside of metropolitan Brisbane. The union is split into eleven country sub-unions. Queensland Country is represented by the Queensland Country Heelers team.

== Structure ==
Country Heelers kit

The Queensland Country Rugby Union has eleven country sub-unions, each running their own club competitions during the year. The sub-unions are grouped into three regional divisions in Northern, Central, and Southern Queensland:

North Queensland

- Far North Queensland Rugby Union
- Townsville and Districts Rugby Union
- Mount Isa
- Mackay

Central Queensland

- Rockhampton
- Central Highlands
- Western Queensland
- Wide Bay – selected from Bundaberg and District Rugby Union, plus teams from Fraser Coast, Gympie, and South Burnett.

South Queensland

- Sunshine Coast Rugby Union
- Darling Downs Rugby Union
- Gold Coast District Rugby Union

Sub-union teams compete in Regional Championships against other teams in their regional division. Representative sides from the three regions are then selected to play at the Queensland Country Championships.

Following the Country Championships, a representative Queensland Country Heelers team is selected by the Queensland Country Rugby Union to play regular fixtures including City-Country matches against Brisbane selections, and the "Battle of the Borders" Cup against the New South Wales Country Cockatoos.

== Rugby Bundaberg ==
- The Waves Falcons
- Bundaberg Barbarians
- Turtles Brothers Rugby
- Isis Crushers
- Bundaberg Pythons

== Far North Queensland Rugby Union ==
- Cairns Northern Beaches Mudcrabs
- Barron-Trinity Bulls
- Brothers Rugby Union
- Cairns Old Crocs Rugby Union
- Cairns Wanderers
- Innisfail Chargers Junior Rugby Union
- JCU Mariners
- Port Douglas Rugby Union
- Southside Crusaders Sports & Culture

== Central Highlands Rugby Union ==
- Capella Rugby Union
- Clermont Rugby Union
- Emerald Rugby
- Moranbah Bulls
- Rolleston Rugby Union

== Central Queensland Rugby Union ==
- Biloela Rugby
- Blackwater Rugby
- Rockhampton Brothers Rugby Union
- Capricorn Coast Rugby
- Colts Rugby Club
- Dawson Valley Rugby Club
- Frenchville Pioneers
- Gladstone Rugby Club
- Mount Morgan Rugby
- Rockhampton Boars
- University Central Queensland Rugby

== Darling Downs Rugby Union ==
- Condamine Rugby Union
- Dalby and District Rugby Union Football Club
- Goondiwindi Rugby
- Highfields Redbacks Rugby Union
- Roma Rugby Union
- South Burnett Rugby
- St George & District Rugby
- Toowoomba Bears Rugby
- Toowoomba Rangers Rugby
- University Of Southern Queensland Rugby
- Warwick & Districts Rugby
- University of Queensland - Gatton

== Mackay Rugby Union ==
- Bowen Rugby
- Brothers Mackay
- City Rugby Club
- Kuttabul Rugby
- Proserpine/Whitsunday Rugby Union
- Slade Point Rugby

== Mt Isa Rugby Union ==
- Cloncurry Rugby
- Euros Rugby Union
- Keas Rugby
- Warrigals Rugby

== Gold Coast and District Rugby Union ==
- Beaudesert Rugby Football Club
- Bond University Rugby Club
- Bond Pirates Rugby Club
- Casuarina Beach Rugby Club
- Colleges Rugby Club
- Coolangatta Tweed Barbarians
- Coomera Crushers RU
- Gold Coast Eagles
- Griffith Uni Colleges Knights Rugby Union Club
- Helensvale Hogs RUC
- Hinterland Celtics Rugby Club
- Nerang Bulls RUC
- Palm Beach Currumbin Alleygators RUC
- Surfers Paradise Dolphins
- Tamborine Mountain Rugby

== Sunshine Coast Rugby Union ==
- Caboolture Rugby Union
- Caloundra Rugby Union
- Fraser Coast Rugby Union
- Gympie Rugby Union
- Maroochydore Rugby Union
- Nambour Rugby Union
- Noosa District Rugby Union
- University of the Sunshine Coast Rugby Union

== Townsville and Districts Rugby Union ==
- Townsville Brothers Rugby Union
- Burdekin Rugby Union
- Charters Towers Rugby Union
- Ingham Rugby Union
- James Cook University
- North Ward Old Boys Rugby
- Ross River Redskins
- Teachers West Rugby Union

== Western Queensland Rugby Union ==
- Barcaldine Rugby Union
- Collegians Rugby Union
- Longreach Rugby Union

== See also ==
- Rugby union in Queensland
- Queensland Reds
- Queensland Country (NRC team)
- Queensland Country Heelers
- Combined New South Wales–Queensland Country
- Queensland Country Championships
