= Northern Rugby Union =

Northern Rugby Union is a name that has been used by two sporting governing bodies:

- Queensland Rugby Union, the governing body for rugby union in Queensland, Australia, was known as the Northern Rugby Union until 1893.
- Rugby Football League, the governing body for rugby league in the United Kingdom, was known as the Northern Union, Northern Rugby Union or Northern Rugby Football Union between 1895 and 1922.
