= Zane Nonggorr =

Australian rugby union player

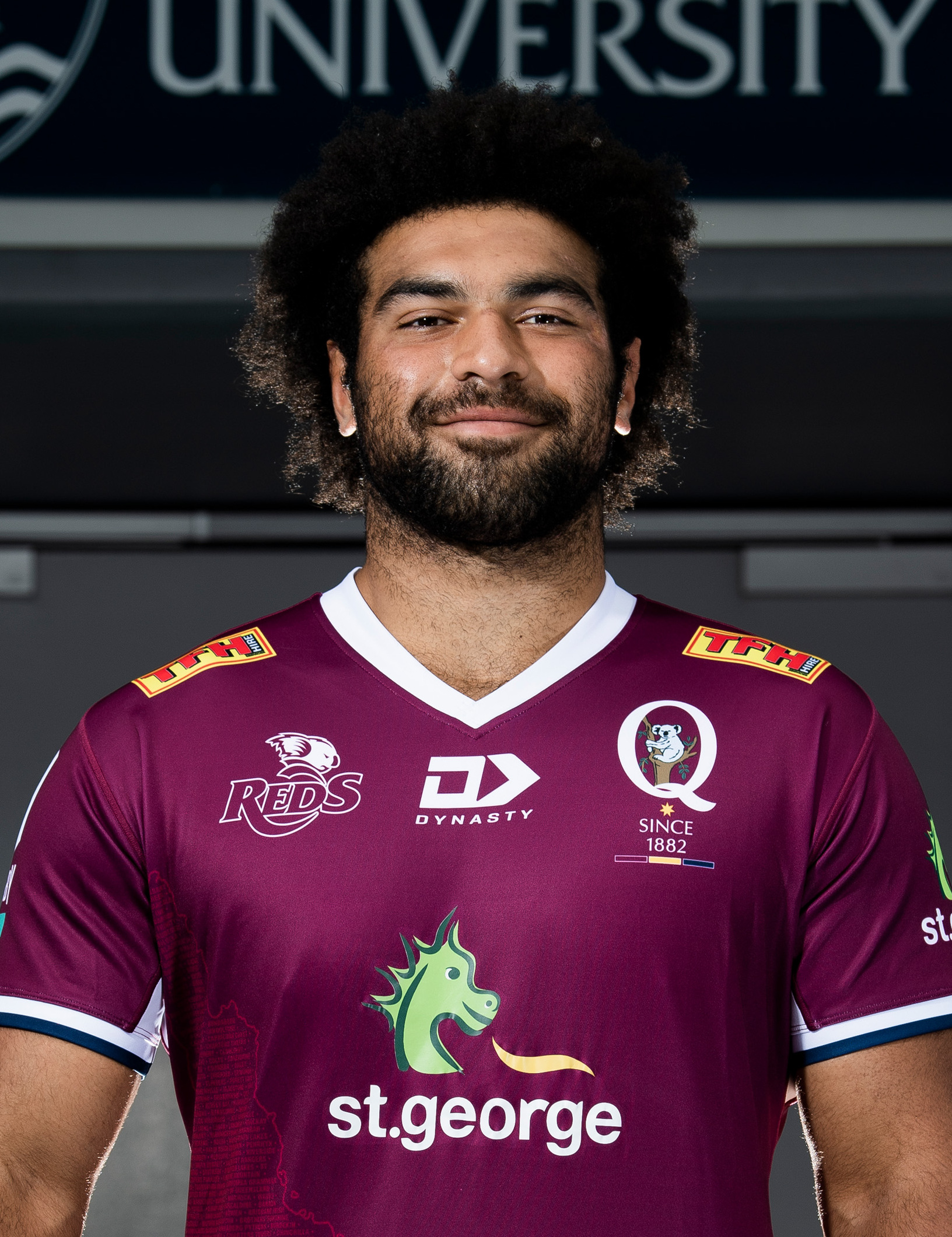
- Nonggorr portrait, 2021
- Born: Zane Nonggorr; 30 March 2001 (age 25) Cairns, Queensland, Australia
- Height: 186 cm (6 ft 1 in)
- Weight: 129 kg (284 lb; 20 st 4 lb)
- School: The Southport School

Rugby union career
- Position: Prop
- Current team: Reds
Youth career
- Gold Coast Eagles
Super Rugby
Years	Team	Apps	(Points)
2020–	Reds	72	(10)
- Correct as of 6 June 2026
International career
Years	Team	Apps	(Points)
2023–	Australia	20	(0)
- Correct as of 14 September 2026

Zane Nonggorr (born 30 March 2001 in Cairns) is an Australian rugby union player who plays for the Reds in Super Rugby. His playing position is prop.

== Career ==
Nonggorr was named in the Reds squad for round 6 of the Super Rugby AU competition in 2020. He made his debut for the Reds in that same round of the Super Rugby AU competition against the Waratahs, coming on as a replacement.

In July 2023, Nonggorr made his debut for Australia against South Africa in Pretoria.
