= Sean Hardman =

Australia international rugby union player

- Born: 6 May 1977 (age 49) Sydney, Australia
- Height: 183 cm (6 ft 0 in)
- Weight: 105 kg (16 st 7 lb)
- School: St. Joseph's Nudgee College

Rugby union career
- Position: Hooker
Provincial / State sides
Years	Team	Apps	(Points)
1999–10	Brothers Old Boys	111	(20)
Super Rugby
Years	Team	Apps	(Points)
2000–10	Queensland Reds	148	(20)
International career
Years	Team	Apps	(Points)
2002–07	Australia	4	(0)
2002	Australia A		

Sean Hardman (born 6 May 1977) is a former Australian rugby union player who played as a hooker for the Queensland Reds in the Super Rugby competition. He also represented Australia internationally, where he made his debut against France in 2002.

== Career ==
Born in Sydney, but grew up in Brisbane, Sean went to the prestigious rugby nursery, St Joseph’s Nudgee College.

Hardman debuted for the Reds in 1999 against the Auckland Blues and has since played over 100 games for the Queensland side. Hardman has also represented Australia at test, under 21 and A level and was the Wallabies third string hooker at the 2007 Rugby World Cup behind Adam Freier and Stephen Moore.

Hardman made his test debut against France in 2002 but slowly fell out of favour with the Wallaby selectors despite consistent form with the Reds and did not make another test appearance until 2006 in the Wallabies 49–0 defeat against the Springboks with a cameo off the bench. Hardman would again play for the Wallabies against a second string South African side in the 2007 tri nations, again off the bench and was a surprise inclusion into the Wallabies 2007 Rugby World cup squad as the third hooker as it was expected that either Jeremy Paul or Tatafu Polota-Nau would be chosen ahead of him.

Hardman played one game at the world cup coming off the bench against Canada in Australia's final pool match.
