= Darling Downs Rugby Union =

Australian Rugby Union Governing Body

- Sport: Rugby Union
- Jurisdiction: Darling Downs, Queensland, Australia
- Abbreviation: DDRU
- Affiliation: Queensland Rugby Union
- Regional affiliation: Queensland Country Rugby Union
- Headquarters: Toowoomba, Queensland

Official website
- downsrugby.com.au

The Darling Downs District Rugby Union, or DDRU, is the governing body for the sport of rugby union within the District of Darling Downs, Queensland in Australia. It is a member of the Queensland Country Rugby Union.

== Clubs ==
The clubs that compete in the senior grade competition are:

- Condamine Rugby Union
- Dalby Wheatmen Rugby Union Football Club
- Gatton Black Pigs Rugby Union Club
- Goondiwindi Rugby
- Highfields Redbacks Rugby Union
- Roma Rugby Union
- South Burnett Rugby
- St George & District Rugby
- Toowoomba Bears Rugby
- Toowoomba Rangers Rugby
- University Of Southern Queensland Rugby Club
- Warwick & Districts Rugby

== See also ==
Rugby union in Queensland
