= Brothers Rugby Club =

Australian rugby union club, based in Brisbane

(Australia) Brothers Rugby Club
- Full name: Brothers Rugby Club (Inc)
- Union: Queensland Rugby Union
- Founded: 1905; 121 years ago
- Region: Brisbane
- Ground: Crosby Park (Capacity: 2,500)
- President: Tony Lalor
- Coach: Ben McCormack
- League: Queensland Premier Rugby
- 2026: Premiers
Team kit

Official website
- www.brothersrugby.com

Brothers Rugby Club (formally Brothers Old Boys) is an Australian rugby union club based in Brisbane, Queensland. The name alludes to its beginnings as a rugby club founded by alumni of schools established by the Congregation of Christian Brothers.

Brothers competes in the Queensland Premier Rugby competition against nine of the state's best Rugby Union clubs. The club was established in 1905 and has won 31 'A' Grade premierships. They have produced 272 Queensland and 96 Internationals including 83 Wallaby players over the last century.

The club is located at Crosby Park, Albion where it has a clubhouse, two canteens and the use of two illuminated fields.

== History ==
=== First golden era ===
The Brothers Old Boys Rugby Union Club was formed at a meeting held in 1905 by members of the Christian Brothers Old Boys Association who were predominately old boys of Gregory Terrace, Nudgee College and St James College who wanted a Rugby club that 'old boys' (past students) could all play for. It was further decided at this meeting to play in the school colours, blue and white hoops. These were the St Joseph's College Gregory Terrace colours of the time. In 1905, the team played in plain hoops but the Scottish supplier incorrectly sent navy and white irregular hoops ('butcher stripes') for the 1906 season and the club has maintained this jersey ever since.

In 1907, after only the second year in the Brisbane Premier Rugby competition, Brothers won their first premiership defeating Valleys 18 – 8. Brothers next string of success was titled the 'First Golden Era' when they won premierships in 1911, 1912, 1913, 1915 and 1919. During this period the club was so strong that in 1914 they fielded two teams in the competition Brothers 'A' & 'B', and six players for the Australian team (Wallabies) during the 1914 series against New Zealand—just one less than the record seven players for a home Test series set in 1899 by Sydney's Wallaroo FC. The end of the 1919 season saw the demise of Rugby Union in Queensland, Rugby league became the 'code of choice' and Brisbane Premier Rugby came to a halt.

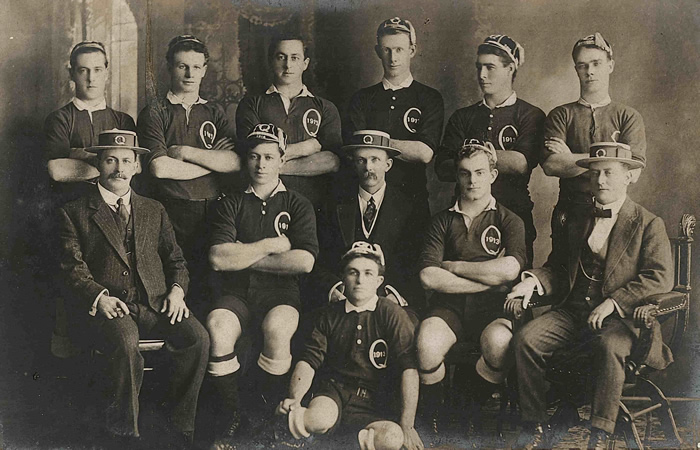
Pat Murphy, Jimmy Flynn (2nd row 2nd from right), M. J. McMahon, R. McManus, Hugh Flynn (Back row 3rd from right), Vin Carmichael, Tom Ryan, Bill Morrissey and Joe Russell (seated front).

=== Queensland versus New South Wales interstate clash ===
In 1913, nine Brothers players represented Queensland in the interstate clash in Sydney and helped the team to a 22 – 21 victory. In addition to Pat Murphy and Jimmy Flynn these players were M. J. McMahon, R. McManus, Hugh Flynn, Vin. Carmichael, Tom Ryan, Bill Morrissey and Joe Russell. Another Brothers player to be selected for state and country during these years was R. 'Clinker' Birt.

=== Second golden era ===
Rugby Union was re-introduced in Queensland in 1929 and Brothers returned to the QRU in 1930, but it wouldn't be until 1945 that it tasted success. They secured their first trophy in the senior competition since the recommencement of competition with a 13 – 6 victory over University in the final of the mid-season Tom Welsby Cup in 1945. Brothers went on that year to contest the premiership final but went down to none other than arch rivals University. It was the start of a bright period for the club, a 'second golden era' saw premiership wins in 1946, 1949, 1950, 1951 and 1953.

Brothers become the first club in Brisbane to have their own ground at Crosby Park, Albion. The original arrangement began with the QRU as lease holder in 1949 but Brothers took over the lease in their own right in 1951. Prior to the move the players would train under lights at the local public New Farm Park.

The success of the late 1940s and early '50s was not repeated for more than a decade, except for a premiership win in 1959. Following the 1959 premiership win things reached possibly the lowest point ever for the club. The year 1963 saw the club struggle to field a competitive team but things began to turn around in 1964 with Premierships in 1966 and 1968.

=== Third golden era ===
The 1970s marked the start of a 'third golden era' for the club as 'A' grade premierships continued in 1971, 1973, 1974, 1975, 1978 and then an unbroken and unprecedented record of five in a row from 1980 to 1984. This gave Brothers ten premierships in a 14-year period from 1971 to 1984, a remarkable achievement. The resurgence of Brothers contributed greatly to the Queensland Rugby revival. Brothers other success in the 1980s came in 1987 when they defeated Souths 20–19.

=== 1990s to 2009 ===
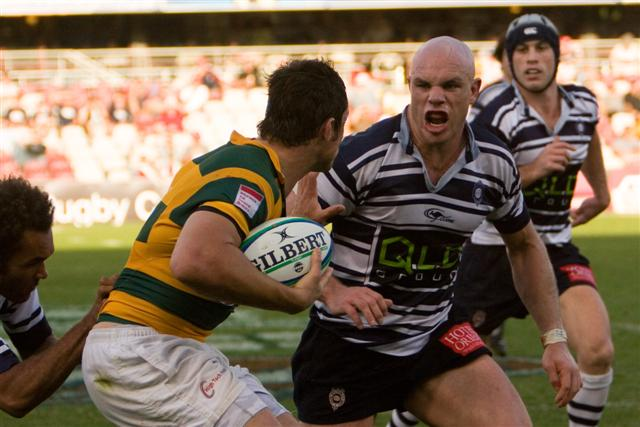
Australian international David Croft playing for Brothers (Blue & White) against Wests (Green & Gold) in the 2006 Grand Final.

The Premiership successes had been missing from the club since 1987, and the first and only grand final appearance in the '90s came in a loss to rivals University in the 1990 Grand Final. Brothers continued to produce quality players such as past Wallaby captain John Eales, former Queensland Reds captain and Australian Vice Captain Elton Flatley and fellow Reds players David Croft and Sean Hardman along with the recently retired Glen Panoho. In 2005, the club celebrated its Centenary and the following year after a long 16 year absence reached the Grand Final, losing 23–22 to Wests in the 2006 Grand Final. Once again in 2008, Brothers would lose another Grand Final, this time to Easts by the barest of margins falling short 21 points to Easts 22. The defeat would not last long in the memories for the club as they made back-to-back grand finals and in September 2009, after a long-awaited 22-year drought, Brothers won their 27th premiership by defeating Souths 26–19.

=== 2010 - 2019 ===
The 2009 result rejuvenated the club, with frequent finals series appearances post 2010. In 2010 Brothers faced off against the University of Sydney in the Australian Club Championship, winning the contest 36 to 26, making it the club's fourth national title.

In 2016, Brothers won their 28th premiership defeating traditional rivals University 31–28, making it the club's second title after the turn of the millennium. The club would make it to another grand final in 2019, losing to the University of Queensland 31-26 at Ballymore.

=== 2020 - present ===
The 2020s have continued to be strong years for the club, with the club reaching its 120 year anniversary in 2025. In 2023, Brothers claimed their first premiership in seven years by defeating Wests 26-24, making it the club's 29th title, clinching victory on the final play, holding up the Bulldogs in goal. In 2024, Brothers won their fifth Australian Club Championship, defeating old interstate foes Randwick 25-18 on the 50th anniversary of their first meeting. Brothers then went on to become the first back-to-back premiers in over 20 years (Canberra Vikings, 2001-2003), taking the club's 30th title defeating Wests by two points once again, with a final score of 29-27. In 2025, Brothers made their third straight grand final appearance resulting in a narrow defeat to Bond University with a final score of 25-27. In 2026, Brothers had one of the most dominant seasons in Hospital Cup history finishing the regular season with 14 wins, one loss and one draw. Beating Norths in the semi-finals before defeating Wests in the grand final 51-14 securing their third premiership in four years.

== Rivalry with 'The Red Heavies' ==
The long tradition of clashes with University (nicknamed 'The Red Heavies' or 'The Students') first began in senior competition on 8 June 1912, with Brothers running out victors 24 – 0. The tradition of hard, close fought games between these two clubs remains a feature of the Brisbane club scene and there have been many memorable tussles over the years, particularly in grand finals. The most famous being the 24-all draw in 1979 that resulted in a rematch where Brothers lost 16–13 in a tight match. The latest bragging rights are with University after a 31–26 win in the 2019 final, the last time the teams have met in a grand final.

== Premiership Finals results ==
Premiers (31)

- 1907 Brothers 18–8 South Brisbane
- 1911 Brothers 21–10 Valleys
- 1912 Brothers 20–0 Eastern Suburbs
- 1913 Brothers 12–0 Past Grammar
- 1915 Brothers 6–0 Valleys
- 1919 Brothers 20–9 University
- 1926* Brothers 6–5 Coorparoo
- 1946 Brothers 11–6 GPS
- 1949 Brothers 13–8 University
- 1950 Brothers 21–10 University
- 1951 Brothers 17–6 GPS
- 1953 Brothers 11–9 University
- 1959 Brothers 13–11 University
- 1966 Brothers 36–9 University
- 1968 Brothers 17–6 University
- 1971 Brothers 17–3 Easts
- 1973 Brothers 20–10 GPS
- 1974 Brothers 27–19 GPS
- 1975 Brothers 23–9 GPS
- 1978 Brothers 19–15 University
- 1980 Brothers 19–0 Souths
- 1981 Brothers 36–13 Teachers-Norths
- 1982 Brothers 25–16 University
- 1983 Brothers 30–15 University
- 1984 Brothers 18–3 Easts
- 1987 Brothers 20–19 Souths
- 2009 Brothers 26–19 Souths
- 2016 Brothers 31–28 University
- 2023 Brothers 26–24 Wests
- 2024 Brothers 29–27 Wests
- 2026 Brothers 51–14 Wests

Grand Finalists (24)

- 1909 Valleys 19–3 Brothers
- 1910 Valleys 6–0 Brothers
- 1914 Past Grammar 11–8 Brothers
- 1917* Valleys 13–5 Merthyr^{†}
- 1918* Valleys 12–8 Merthyr^{†}
- 1920* Wests 16–8 Brothers
- 1924* Valleys 11–8 Brothers
- 1932 University 8–6 Brothers
- 1935 Eagle Junction 19–14 Brothers
- 1941 University 23–6 Brothers
- 1945 University 15–10 Brothers
- 1947 University 8–6 Brothers
- 1952 University 11–3 Brothers
- 1960 University 11–6 Brothers
- 1969 University 22–14 Brothers
- 1977 Wests 15–10 Brothers
- 1979^{‡} University 16–13 Brothers
- 1986 Souths 31–13 Brothers
- 1990 University 19–10 Brothers
- 2006 Wests 23–22 Brothers
- 2008 Easts 22–21 Brothers
- 2011 Sunnybank 35–24 Brothers
- 2019 University 31-26 Brothers
- 2025 Bond 27–25 Brothers

Notes

* Brothers played rugby league in the Brisbane premiership from 1917 to 1918 (as Merthyr) and from 1920 to 1929 (as Brothers). The rugby union competition was suspended from 1916 to 1918, and disbanded between 1920 and 1928. Brothers Old Boys started playing rugby union again in 1930.
† Brothers played under the name Merthyr Football Club in the QRL (Metropolitan) rugby league competition from 1917 to 1918 .
‡ The 1979 Grand Final was replayed after a 24–24 draw.

== National Club Champions ==
The Australian Club Championship is a challenge match between the Brisbane (Hospital Challenge Cup) and Sydney (Shute Shield) "A" Grade Premiers.

Champions

- 1974 Brothers 45–22 Randwick
- 1984 Brothers 25–14 Manly
- 1985 Brothers 10–6 Randwick
- 2010 Brothers 36–26 Sydney University
- 2024 Brothers 25–18 Randwick

Runners-up

- 1908 Glebe 9–0 Brothers
- 1918* South Sydney 28–10 Merthyr^{†§}
- 1982 Randwick 22–13 Brothers
- 1983 Randwick 32–29 Brothers
- 1988 Randwick 27–9 Brothers
- 2017 Northern Suburbs 27–5 Brothers
- 2025 Eastern Suburbs 28–26 Brothers

Notes

* Brothers played rugby league in the Brisbane premiership from 1917 to 1918 (as Merthyr) and from 1920 to 1929 (as Brothers). The rugby union competition was suspended from 1916 to 1918, and disbanded between 1920 and 1928. Brothers Old Boys started playing rugby union again in 1930.
† Brothers played under the name Merthyr Football Club in the QRL (Metropolitan) rugby league competition from 1917 to 1918.
§ Merthyr also played South Sydney for the "Rugby League Team Championship of Australia" at the Brisbane Cricket Ground.

== International Captains ==
- Jimmy Flynn
- Tom Gorman
- Des Connor
- Tony Shaw
- Paul McLean
- Rod McCall
- John Eales
- Harry Wilson
- Fraser McReight
- Epi Bolawagatabu (Fiji)

== Internationals ==
- John Fihelly
- Phil Carmichael
- Bob McMaster
- Kevin Bourke
- Kevin Ryan
- Bob Honan
- Barry Honan
- Chris Handy
- Mark McBain
- Ilivasi Tabua
- Elton Flatley
- Glen Panoho
- Sam Cordingley
- Sean Hardman
- David Croft
- Dom Shipperley
- David L'Estrange
- Brendan Moon
- Alex Pope
- Dallas O'Neill
- Peter Grigg
- Ross Hanley
- Mick Freney
- Dick Cocks
- Jeff McLean
- Damien Frawley
- Michael Barry
- Peter Reilly
- Rod Kelleher
- David Dunworth
- Dominic Maguire
- Harry Roberts
- Col Forbes
- Tom Sweeney
- James O'Connor
- Taniela Tupou
- Harry Wilson
- Fraser McReight

== Club Premier Partners ==
- Seymour Furlong Compensation Lawyers

== Brothers Junior Rugby Union Club ==
The Junior club that operated out of Crosby Park was an amalgamation of two junior clubs. The original junior clubs were Brothers Old Boys Sub-Junior section (Under 13-17) which commenced fielding teams in 1968, and Ascot Clayfield Sub-Junior Rugby Club (Under 7-12) which was founded in 1969.

Ascot-Clayfield originally played out of Hamilton Recreation Reserve (now known as Hercules Park), but moved to Crosby Park in 1983, on the invitation of the Brothers Club President Bob Conn. Ascot Clayfield originally sported green and blue hooped jerseys but changed to a harlequin design in the late 1980s.

The two junior clubs amalgamated to be called Brothers-Ascot Clayfield in 1991. In 2005, the Junior club moved to develop tighter bonds with Brothers Rugby Club, by rebranding themselves as Brothers Junior Rugby Union Club, with all teams donning the navy and white butcher-stripe jerseys in line with the senior club.

In 2013, with the participation numbers climbing above 50 teams and 740 players, the junior club moved its Under 6-9 age groups to Windsor Park.

== See also ==
- Queensland Premier Rugby
- Rugby union in Queensland
