= David Croft (rugby union) =

Australia international rugby union player

- Born: David Croft; 22 February 1979 (age 47) Brisbane, Queensland, Australia
- Height: 185 cm (6 ft 1 in)
- Weight: 99 kg (15 st 8 lb)
- School: St. Joseph's College, Gregory Terrace, Brisbane
- Occupation: Professional rugby union footballer

Rugby union career
- Position: Flanker
- Current team: retired
Super Rugby
Years	Team	Apps	(Points)
2000–08	Reds	116	(45)
- Correct as of 11 July 2014
International career
Years	Team	Apps	(Points)
2002-03	Australia	5	(0)
- Correct as of 11 July 2014

David Croft (born 22 February 1979 in Brisbane) is a former Australian rugby union player. He played openside flanker (Number 7) for the Queensland Reds, Melbourne Rebels (ARC) and Brothers.

He also won 5 caps representing Australia and was included in the squad that took part in the 2003 Rugby World Cup.

He retired from professional rugby in 2008 aged 29, and definitely in late 2009, aged 30.

He then became the General Manager of International Quarterback the Sports Management Company who manage Australia Sporting stars such as Grant Hackett, Libby Trickett and Michael Clarke.
