= Townsville and Districts Rugby Union =

Club information
- Website: tdru.com.au

Current details
- Ground: Mike Carney Toyota Park (Capacity: 5,000)
- Competition: Queensland Country Championship

The Townsville and District Rugby Union (TDRU) is a regional rugby union based in the city of Townsville, Queensland, Australia. It was founded in 1967 and is the governing body for rugby union in and around the city of Townsville.

== Clubs ==
- Brothers Rugby Union (Townsville)
- Burdekin Rugby Union
- Charters Towers Rugby Union
- Grammar Rugby Union
- Ingham Rugby Union
- James Cook University of North Queensland Rugby Union
- North Ward Junior Rugby
- North Ward Old Boys Rugby
- Ross River Redskins/Lavarack Army Rugby Club (LARC)
- Teachers West Rugby Union
- Western Suburbs Rugby Union

== See also ==
- Rugby union in Queensland
