= Tom Perrin =

Australian rugby union player

Thomas Drummond Perrin (26 February 1911– 21 April 1975) was an Australian Rugby Union player who represented for the Wallabies twice.

Perrin (right)) with Syd Malcolm, Wallaby captain

== Early life ==
Perrin was born in Summer Hill and attended Newington College (1924–1927).

== Club rugby ==
He grew up in Mosman and as a second rower joined Northern Suburbs Rugby Club after leaving school and played in their premiership side in 1933.

== Representative rugby ==
He toured New Zealand in 1931 with the Wallabies and played in seven of the ten games played and two tests.
