= Gold Coast Eagles =

Australian rugby union club, based in Gold Coast, Queensland

Gold Coast 'Eagles'
- Full name: Gold Coast Rugby Union Football Club Inc.
- Union: Queensland Rugby Union
- Branch: Queensland Country; Gold Coast D.R.U.
- Founded: 1964; 62 years ago
- Location: Southport, Queensland
- Ground: James Overell Park
- President: Jason Teren
- League: Gold Coast Premier Rugby
- 2015: 1st

Official website
- www.eaglesrugby.com.au

The Gold Coast Eagles Rugby Union Football Club is an Australian rugby union football club that competes in the Gold Coast and District Rugby Union competition. The club is based in Southport on Queensland's Gold Coast.

== History ==
The foundation club for rugby union on the Gold Coast was the Gold Coast Eagles. The club was registered with the Queensland Rugby Union (QRU) after a positive response at the initial foundation meeting in late 1964.

== See also ==
- Sports on the Gold Coast, Queensland
- Rugby union in Queensland
- List of Australian rugby union teams
