= Queensland Premier Rugby =

Rugby union competition in Australia

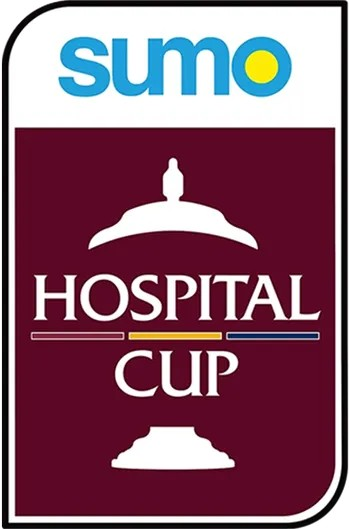
- Sport: Rugby union
- Founded: 1887; 139 years ago
- Organising body: Queensland Rugby Union
- No. of teams: 9
- Country: Australia
- Most recent champion: Brothers Rugby Club (2026)
- Most titles: University of Queensland (33 titles)
- Broadcasters: Nine Network; Stan Sport
- Related competitions: Shute Shield
- Website: https://qld.rugby/

Queensland Premier Rugby (QRU), also known as the Sumo Energy Hospital Cup for sponsorship reasons, is a semi-professional club rugby union competition in South East Queensland (SEQ), Australia. Nine clubs play in the competition, eight clubs are from Brisbane, and one club is from Gold Coast. The premiership has been contested in its present form since 1929.

== History ==
The Queensland Premier Rugby evolved out of the Brisbane club competition that had been running since 1887. It was created by players, administrators, referees and coaches to expand and improve the top level of Queensland non-professional rugby. QPR provides Queensland rugby players a stepping stone for selection into the Queensland Reds and other teams in Super Rugby or other professional rugby competitions.

Previous to 1920, the Hospitals Challenge Cup was established as a fund-raising exercise for the Brisbane General Hospital. After the devastation of World War I the competition was suspended until the Hospitals Cup was established. The Brisbane Club competition recommenced in 1929.

The 1975 Grand Final was played between the Brothers club and GPS and Brothers won the match. Teachers-Norths, Wests and again Brothers won the next seasons. In 1979, the first ever draw in a final occurred with a 24-all draw between rivals University and Brothers, a reply of the final was held, which saw University defeat Brothers by a mere 3 points. Brothers dominated the next few seasons, winning the 1980 to 1984 premierships. Souths won their first title in 1986, and University won a number of titles at the end of the decade.

Souths came to major prominence during the 1990s, winning the competition five times in a row from 1991 through to 1995, and then again in 1998 and 2000. They also featured in the 1996 season final which GPS won, and the 1997 final which Easts won. Canberra also competed in the competition, and found major success, winning three titles in a row from 2001 to 2003. The Gold Coast Breakers also began to become a force in the competition, featuring in five finals from 2001 to 2007, although they were on the receiving end of the competitions largest ever grand final score being thrashed 85-19 by the Sunnybank Dragons in the 2007 Grand Final.

In future, teams from other Rugby regions in Queensland may also join the competition, thus encouraging the pursuit of Rugby excellence across the state, not just confining it Queensland's south-east corner. However at a meeting of the Sunshine Coast Rugby Union in October 2013, it was decided by the members not to compete in the 2014 QRU’s Premier Rugby Competition, but will instead focus its energy on becoming the leading force in regional rugby.

== Other trophies ==
Thomas Welsby Memorial Cup: The top two first grade teams at the end of the first full round of home and away matches contest the Welsby Cup in their second round meeting. The cup was originally donated by Thomas Welsby.

Keith Horsley Memorial Trophy: Now presented to First Grade Minor Premiers, since 1978. The trophy donated by the Family of Sgt Keith Thornton Horsley who was Killed in Action during WW2.

Doughty Challenge Shield: Named for businessman Hector Randall Doughty, a former marine engineer with the Queensland Harbours and Rivers Department and lightweight champion boxer, the Doughty Shield is awarded annually to the champion Brisbane club, based on competition points won across all participating grades.

== Queensland Premier Rugby Teams ==
=== Current Teams ===
| Queensland Premier Rugby Club | Colours | Moniker | City/Region/Town | Suburb/s | Est. | Premiership/s | Most recent |
|---|---|---|---|---|---|---|---|
| Brothers Brisbane | | Filth | Brisbane | Albion | 1905 | 31 (Note: 30 QRU, 1 BRL.) | 2026; 0 years ago |
| University of Queensland | | Students | Brisbane | St Lucia | 1911 | 33 (Note: 31 QRU, 2 BRL.) | 2021; 5 years ago |
| GPS (Great Public Schools) | | Gallopers | Brisbane | Ashgrove | 1931 | 6 | 2018; 8 years ago |
| South Brisbane | | Magpies | Brisbane | Annerley | 1948 | 10 | 2015; 11 years ago |
| East Brisbane | | Tigers | Brisbane | Norman Park | 1947 | 5 | 2020; 6 years ago |
| West Brisbane | | Bulldogs | Brisbane | Toowong | 1951 | 4 | 2022; 4 years ago |
| Sunnybank | | Dragons | Brisbane | MacGregor | 1969 | 3 | 2011; 15 years ago |
| North Brisbane | | Eagles | Brisbane | Wooloowin | 1991 | 2 (Note: Both Premierships were as Teachers / Teachers–Norths.) | 1976; 50 years ago |
| Bond University* | | Bullsharks | Gold Coast | Robina | 2014 | 1 (Note: One earlier as Gold Coast Breakers.) | 2025; 1 year ago |

=== Former Teams ===
| Queensland Premier Rugby Club | Colours | Moniker | City/Region/Town | Suburb/s | Est. | Premiership/s | Most recent |
|---|---|---|---|---|---|---|---|
| Gold Coast* | | Breakers | Gold Coast | Robina | 1996 | 1 (Note: As Gold Coast Breakers.) | 2004; 22 years ago |
| Sunshine Coast | | Stingrays | Sunshine Coast | K. Waters | 2005 | | |
| Canberra | | Vikings | Canberra | Canberra | 1994 | 3 | 2003; 23 years ago |

- Gold Coast Breakers were reformed as Bond University Bullsharks

== Grand Final results, Hospital Cup winners (since 1946) ==
| 2026 | Brothers Brisbane | 51–14 | West Brisbane |
| 2025 | Bond University | 27–25 | Brothers Brisbane |
| 2024 | Brothers Brisbane | 29–27 | West Brisbane |
| 2023 | Brothers Brisbane | 26–24 | West Brisbane |
| 2022 | West Brisbane | 44–27 | University of Queensland |
| 2021 | University of Queensland | 29–12 | GPS Brisbane |
| 2020 | East Brisbane | 33–18 | University of Queensland |
| 2019 | University of Queensland | 31–26 | Brothers Brisbane |
| 2018 | GPS Brisbane | 23–16 | University of Queensland |
| 2017 | University of Queensland | 23–14 | GPS Brisbane |
| 2016 | Brothers Brisbane | 31–28 | University of Queensland |
| 2015 | South Brisbane | 39–12 | East Brisbane |
| 2014 | University of Queensland | 20–18 | Sunnybank |
| 2013 | East Brisbane | 27–22 | GPS Brisbane |
| 2012 | University of Queensland | 46–20 | Sunnybank |
| 2011 | Sunnybank | 35–24 | Brothers Brisbane |
| 2010 | University of Queensland | 19–11 | Sunshine Coast |
| 2009 | Brothers Brisbane | 26–19 | South Brisbane |
| 2008 | East Brisbane | 22–21 | Brothers Brisbane |
| 2007 | Sunnybank | 85–19 | Gold Coast |
| 2006 | West Brisbane | 23–22 | Brothers Brisbane |
| 2005 | Sunnybank | 41–17 | Gold Coast |
| 2004 | Gold Coast | 24–18 | University of Queensland |
| 2003 | Canberra | 29–16 | Gold Coast |
| 2002 | Canberra | 45–3 | East Brisbane |
| 2001 | Canberra | 32–10 | Gold Coast |
| 2000 | South Brisbane | 34–30 | West Brisbane |
| 1999 | East Brisbane | 16–15 | West Brisbane |
| 1998 | South Brisbane | 34–18 | West Brisbane |
| 1997 | East Brisbane | 18–16 | South Brisbane |
| 1996 | GPS Brisbane | 12–6 | South Brisbane |
| 1995 | South Brisbane | 27–11 | East Brisbane |
| 1994 | South Brisbane | 19–8 | Sunnybank |
| 1993 | South Brisbane | 27–8 | Sunnybank |
| 1992 | South Brisbane | 44–10 | University of Queensland |
| 1991 | South Brisbane | 22–15 | West Brisbane |
| 1990 | University of Queensland | 19–10 | Brothers Brisbane |
| 1989 | University of Queensland | 34–9 | South Brisbane |
| 1988 | University of Queensland | 18–10 | South Brisbane |
| 1987 | Brothers Brisbane | 20–19 | South Brisbane |
| 1986 | South Brisbane | 31–13 | Brothers Brisbane |
| 1985 | West Brisbane | 10–7 | University of Queensland |
| 1984 | Brothers Brisbane | 18–3 | East Brisbane |
| 1983 | Brothers Brisbane | 30–15 | University of Queensland |
| 1982 | Brothers Brisbane | 25–16 | University of Queensland |
| 1981 | Brothers Brisbane | 36–13 | Teachers-North Brisbane |
| 1980 | Brothers Brisbane | 19–0 | South Brisbane |
| 1979 | University of Queensland | 16–13 | Brothers Brisbane |
| 1978 | Brothers Brisbane | 19–15 | University of Queensland |
| 1977 | West Brisbane | 15–10 | Brothers Brisbane |
| 1976 | Teachers-North Brisbane | 16–4 | GPS Brisbane |
| 1975 | Brothers Brisbane | 23–6 | GPS Brisbane |
| 1974 | Brothers Brisbane | 27–19 | GPS Brisbane |
| 1973 | Brothers Brisbane | 20–10 | GPS Brisbane |
| 1972 | GPS Brisbane | 23–18 | University of Queensland |
| 1971 | Brothers Brisbane | 17–3 | East Brisbane |
| 1970 | University of Queensland | 24–6 | GPS Brisbane |
| 1969 | University of Queensland | 22–14 | Brothers Brisbane |
| 1968 | Brothers Brisbane | 17–6 | University of Queensland |
| 1967 | University of Queensland | 17–15 | GPS Brisbane |
| 1966 | Brothers Brisbane | 36–9 | University of Queensland |
| 1965 | University of Queensland | 17–15 | GPS Brisbane |
| 1964 | University of Queensland | 29–9 | Teachers |
| 1963 | Teachers | 28–6 | University of Queensland |
| 1962 | University of Queensland | 18–12 | South Brisbane |
| 1961 | GPS Brisbane | 19–13 | University of Queensland |
| 1960 | University of Queensland | 11–6 | Brothers Brisbane |
| 1959 | Brothers Brisbane | 13–11 | University of Queensland |
| 1958 | South Brisbane | 9–5 | University of Queensland |
| 1957 | University of Queensland | 23–18 | South Brisbane |
| 1956 | University of Queensland | 19–6 | GPS Brisbane |
| 1955 | University of Queensland | 18–16 | South Brisbane |
| 1954 | University of Queensland | 19–3 | GPS Brisbane |
| 1953 | Brothers Brisbane | 11–9 | University of Queensland |
| 1952 | University of Queensland | 11–3 | Brothers Brisbane |
| 1951 | Brothers Brisbane | 17–6 | GPS Brisbane |
| 1950 | Brothers Brisbane | 21–10 | University of Queensland |
| 1949 | Brothers Brisbane | 13–8 | University of Queensland |
| 1948 | University of Queensland | 21–18 | GPS Brisbane |
| 1947 | University of Queensland | 8–6 | Brothers Brisbane |
| 1946 | Brothers Brisbane | 11–6 | GPS Brisbane |

Total Premierships (since 1946)

| Team | Premiers (Hospitals Challenge Cup) | Runners-up (Vince Nicholls Memorial Shield) |
|---|---|---|
| Brothers | 24 | 13 |
| University of Queensland | 24 | 20 |
| Souths | 10 | 10 |
| Easts | 5 | 5 |
| GPS | 4 | 15 |
| Wests | 4 | 7 |
| Sunnybank | 3 | 4 |
| Norths | 0 | 0 |
| Bond University | 1 | 0 |
| Canberra | 3 | 0 |
| Gold Coast | 1 | 4 |
| Teachers-Norths | 1 | 1 |
| Teachers | 1 | 1 |
| Sunshine Coast Stingrays | 0 | 1 |

== Former clubs (since 1929) ==
- B.G.S. Old Boys, Y.M.C.A., Valleys, Wynnum, Past Commercials/Technical College Old Boys
- West End, South Brisbane, Combined High School Old Boys, Starlights (Ipswich)
- Valley Playground Old Boys, Eagle Junction, New Farm, Bretts-Windsor
- Mayne, Windsor, R.A.A.F.
- Maristonians, Police, Northern Districts
- United Services, R.A.A.F. Amberley, Army
- Teachers, Gold Coast Eagles, Q.I.T./Colleges, Ipswich Rangers
- Redcliffe, Teachers-Norths, Kenmore
- Canberra Vikings, Sunshine Coast Stingrays, Gold Coast Breakers

== See also ==
- Australian Club Championship
- Queensland Suburban Rugby Union
- Brisbane City
- Queensland Reds
- National Rugby Championship
- List of Australian club rugby union competitions
