= Rugby union in Queensland =

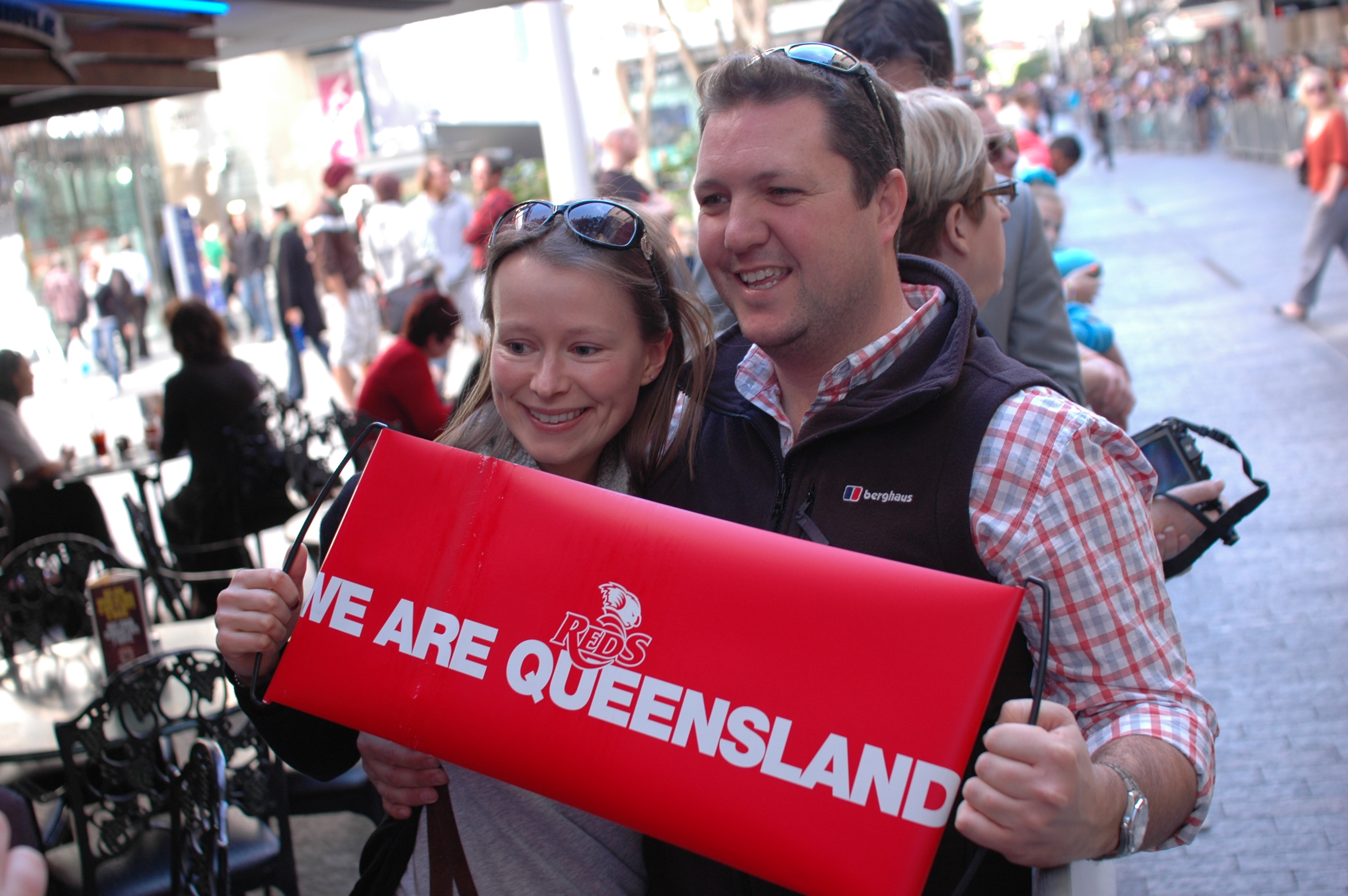
- Queensland Reds fans celebrate their title win in 2011
- Governing body: Queensland Rugby Union
- State team: Queensland Reds
- First played: 1876
- Registered players: 21,234

Club competitions
- Super Rugby; National Rugby Championship; Premier Rugby; Suburban Rugby; Queensland Country Championships

Audience records
- Single match: 52,499 (2013) Wallabies vs British & Irish Lions (Lang Park, Brisbane)

Rugby union in Queensland has traditionally been one of the most popular professional and recreational team sports in the state. Rugby union was introduced in the British colony's capital Brisbane in 1876. Initially it struggled to gain a foothold due to the popularity of Australian rules there until it got its break in 1882 with the first inter-colonial matches against New South Wales, and the formation of the Northern Rugby Union. Between 1885 and 1887 it became the dominant code after the leading schools association decided to play it exclusively and after 1890 spread virtually unopposed throughout the colony.

The rise of professional rugby league in Queensland in 1908 and the Great War ultimately saw the disbandment of the Queensland Rugby Union (‘QRU’) after the 1919 season; however, it was later revived and continues to this day as ‘Queensland Rugby’. Despite increasing competition from three other football codes, rugby thrived in its niche nursery, with the Great Public Schools competition and also representative football holding maximum prestige in the state. With the establishment of a permanent new home at Ballymore Stadium from the 1960s rugby experienced a golden era from the 1980s to 2000s. However it went into sharp decline in the 2010s and by 2018 was the least participated of the four major football codes in the state behind rugby league, soccer and AFL though representative matches still attract a significant audience. The Union has been reluctant to publish participation figures in recent years and has been focused on rebuilding the code.

Queensland's most notable product is Rugby Australia Hall of Famer John Eales who was Australia's most successful Rugby captain. All of Queensland's Hall of Famers have also captained Australia and include Tim Horan, Des Connor, Tom Lawton Snr, Mark Loane, Paul McLean, Tony Shaw and Andrew Slack.

== History of rugby union in Queensland ==
=== Earliest matches ===
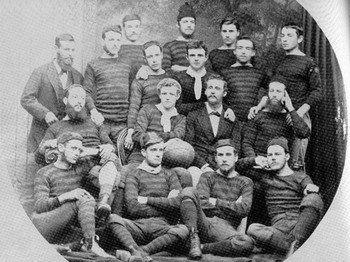
Brisbane Football Club in 1879, Queensland's first football club shortly after it returned to Australian rules following a 3-year experiment with rugby

Rugby football commenced in Queensland in 1876, when the Brisbane FC (which had played according to the ‘Melbourne Rules' (now Australian football) since its founding in 1866), and two newly formed football clubs (Bonnet Rouge FC and Rangers FC) elected to play Rugby football. Rugby continued to be played for three seasons. In 1870 Bonnet Rouge and Rangers folded in 1878 and Brisbane FC (which had periodically played both soccer and rugby as well) returned to playing ‘Victorian rules’ (formerly ‘Melbourne rules’). As a result, rugby was rarely played in the following years.

Fred Lea, an Englishman educated at Allesley College near Rugby in Warwickshire, arrived in Brisbane in 1878 and was amazed to find that Victorian Rules in Queensland was the only football being organised. Lea took up the Victorian game, playing it in 1879–81. However, in 1880 he was able to sway two of the local clubs, Brisbane FC and Wallaroo (1878), to try rugby. Take-up of the code, however was initially very slow.

=== Queensland Football Association era ===
The Queensland Football Association was formed in April 1880 by both rugby and Victorian rules members. While vastly outnumbered by Victorian Association members rugby members lobbied the QFA to schedule matches on a Saturday every 4 weeks during the Victorian Association season, however due to insufficient numbers rugby play was infrequent in the first few seasons.

Just two rugby matches were played in Queensland in 1880. Three matches were played between the clubs in 1881.

By 1882 newly formed football clubs in rural areas began to debate the adoption of either Australian or Rugby rules. Despite just a handful of rugby clubs being overwhelmed by the QFA's senior Victorian association clubs, the push for representative matches saw the voice of the rugby fraternity grow extremely strong.

The 1882 the QFA accepted a challenge to send a team to Sydney to play intercolonial football under rugby rules against New South Wales (now Waratahs). Rugby members of Brisbane FC instigated the move in contact with the Sydney Wallaroo FC. The Sydney Rugby Football Union won a bidding war against the Sydney Football Association, as to which code to play under. The SRFU promised to pay full travel and accommodation costs if the Queenslanders agreed to play only rugby, whereas the SFA offered half of the gate takings if the Queenslanders agreed to play only Victorian rules. Due to the prohibitive costs of travel and expected low gate takings for Victorian rules in Sydney, the rugby offer was far more attractive.

As the NSWRU were keen to keep the inter-colony matches going, a NSW team journeyed to Brisbane in 1883. Trained in readiness by Fred Lea, the Queensland team ambushed the visitors and gained a victory over the New South Welshmen. The win gave rugby in Brisbane a huge boost, with many footballers wanting to try the code. Enough players aligned with the rugby body to form two clubs. Filling the void left by the folding of Bonnet Rouge and Rangers, two new clubs, Fireflies and Wanderers were formed.

Rugby members of the QFA became disgruntled with the Victorian Association's unwillingness to consider intercolonial matches. As a result of increasing pressure from the rugby fraternity to play representative matches against New South Wales, QFA clubs in 1883 voted annually as to whether to continue under the Victorian Association or adopt Rugby Union rules.

Rugby Union members were more than prepared to cover the costs of the shorter trip to Sydney. However Victorian Association officials from Melbourne showed apparent disinterest in sending teams to Queensland. After two Victorian rules tests against New South Wales Queensland rugby footballers began to bypass the QFA and directly organise rugby tests with New South Wales. This angered the QFA and a motion was passed by the QFA secretary that effectively barred players found to be playing Rugby Union from playing at a Victorian Association club, effectively segregating the two codes for the first time since its inception. The move was to backfire as it antagonised its rugby members spurring them into action.

=== Rugby breaks away from the QFA: Formation of the Northern Rugby Union (1883) ===
With Fred Lea (who would be later called 'The Father of Queensland rugby') actively involved, it was decided to form the Northern Rugby Football Union now named Queensland Rugby Union (QRU). On 2 November 1883 a meeting was held at the Exchange Hotel, in Brisbane and the decision was made to form a rugby association in the Colony of Queensland. The name of the newly founded union the Northern Rugby Union, was used to distinguish it from the Southern Rugby Union, which was the governing body of rugby in New South Wales. NRU clubs in response to the QFA, instituted the barring of rugby players from playing Victorian rules and Rugby players and officials began derogatively reverting to the term "Melbourne Association" and "Melbourne Rules" in reference to the QFA and its rules fuelling a sentiment of them being increasingly anti-rugby and anti-Queensland.

Another club Wasps were formed the following year in 1884 and in 1885 Wallaroo (who had been playing both codes) announced it would drop Victorian rules to reform as a rugby club.

=== Rugby becomes Queensland's premier football code ===
If that game (Rugby) takes root in the Brisbane schools, let alone Ipswich or other towns, then say good bye Melbourne, prepare your own epitaph, select your burial year and place, your death is nigh at hand.

— The Queensland Figaro, 15 September 1883

Brisbane Grammar through Richard Powell Francis had switched to rugby in 1885 and while continuing to play both codes pushed for the other Independent Schools to also. The association of Independent Schools headmasters in 1887 by 1 voted to adopt rugby exclusively feeling it would best represent Queensland's interests not to play a code with "Victorian" in its name. As a result, the big schools of Brisbane Grammar, Ipswich Grammar and Toowoomba Grammar, once strongholds of Australian rules, helped establish rugby throughout the colony. The top-level Rugby competition begun by those schools continues in the local Great Public Schools' Association of Queensland (GPS) system to this day.

Between 1885 and 1887, for the first time in the history of the colony, mainstream newspapers began to report rugby results first, followed by Victorian Association (Australian rules) and Anglo Football (soccer) and take a generally greater interest in rugby signalling the premier status of the code.

The decisive blow to Victorian rules came after the decision to make the NSW v Queensland matches an annual fixture, and the visit of a British rugby team in 1888. Teams from New Zealand soon followed. Unable to provide comparable attractions, Victorian rules lost its grip on Brisbane (the last matches were played in 1890) and rugby union quickly spread throughout Queensland unopposed establishing strongholds in Toowoomba, Rockhampton, Maryborough, Gympie and Charters Towers.

The first Northern Rugby Union competition trophy the Hardgrave Challenge Cup was introduced in 1887. It was won that year by Ipswich Rangers, and then Union Harriers in 1888. The Wallaroo club were champions in 1889 and 1890, thereby becoming the Cup's permanent owners.

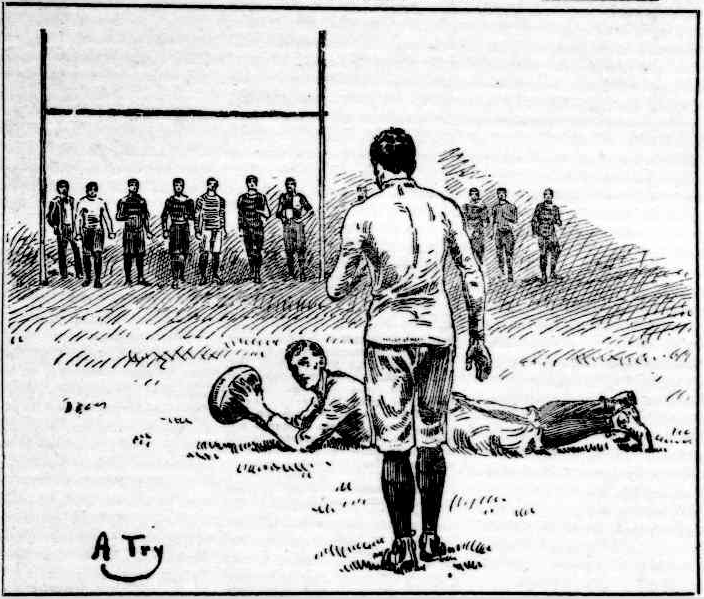
Townsville vs Charters Towers in 1895. Rugby rose dramatically in popularity in North Queensland in the 1890s after the collapse of the QFA.

=== Queensland Rugby Union ===
The year 1893 saw the Northern Rugby Union formally constituted and the name changed to the Queensland Rugby Union. The first organised Brisbane club competition had begun in 1887, but by 1899 the Boer War had reduced player numbers and, to counteract this, electorate rugby was initiated which only allowed players to join the district club in the electorate in which they lived. An annual challenge trophy competition, the Hospital's Cup was introduced in 1899. This trophy is now the Premiership trophy contested by Queensland Premier Rugby clubs.

The first decade of the 20th century brought with it a drop in the fortunes of rugby union in Queensland. Electorate rugby collapsed in 1905 allowing for the return of club rugby, but the advent of the professional code, rugby league, in New South Wales saw many union players leaving for Sydney to play rugby league and get paid in the process, something which the amateur code of rugby union could not offer. In 1908, the QRU banned its players from going to Sydney to play rugby league, which resulted in disgruntled players forming the Queensland Rugby League. Of particular note was that at this time, league put down strong roots in the bush and in working class communities and these areas are still the heartland of the modern game of rugby league.

In 1913 nine Christian Brothers' College Football Club (Brothers) players represented Queensland in the interstate clash in Sydney and helped the team to a 22 - 21 victory.

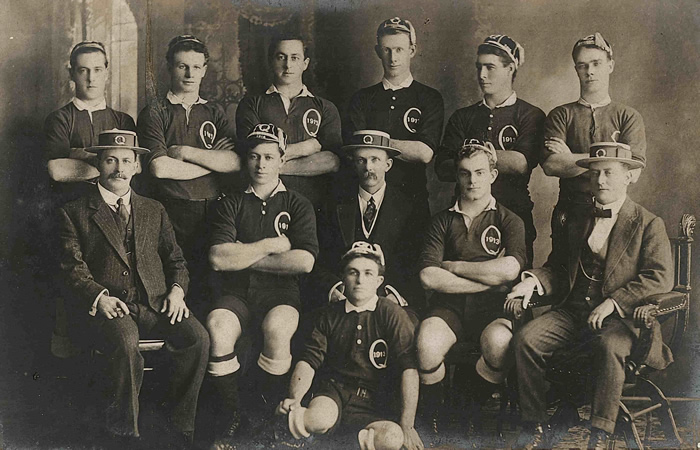
1913 Qld Rep Rugby: Pat Murphy, Jimmy Flynn (2nd row 2nd from right), M J McMahon, R McManus, Hugh Flynn (Back row 3rd from right), Vin Carmichael, Tom Ryan, Bill Morrissey and Joe Russell (seated front).

Brothers were such a strong club in these years that they entered two teams "A" & "B" in the senior premiership in 1914 with the teams meeting each other in the Hospital Cup. Both sides were strong and contained internationals and interstate representative players. During these pre war years Brothers also won the inaugural "College" grade competition in 1911.

World War I, from 1916 to 1918, was almost the final death blow to rugby union in Queensland. Many players went away to war and never returned, and the burgeoning popularity of the professional code saw some major clubs and all the GPS schools switch to rugby league. It seemed that the resultant disbandment of the QRU at the end of the 1919 season, heralded the end of rugby union in Queensland.

However, all was not lost. In 1928, the QRU reformed and the major clubs and GPS schools returned to union as a result of bickering amongst league officials and the Senior Club competition restarted in 1929. World War II saw the game struggle once more, but this time it was strong enough to pull through and rugby union continued to grow. In 1950, the QRU secured the use of Normanby at a nominal rent from the Brisbane Grammar School Board of Trustees. In 1961, the Queensland Junior Rugby Union was formed and 1965 saw the formation of the Queensland Country Rugby Union. And finally, in 1966, the QRU moved to the home of Queensland rugby union, Ballymore.

Having paid a secretary to perform various tasks during the 1960s and 1970s, Terry Doyle was appointed as the first chief executive officer of the QRU in 1980. He stayed with the QRU until 1996 and saw the organisation grow from one person to 32 personnel.

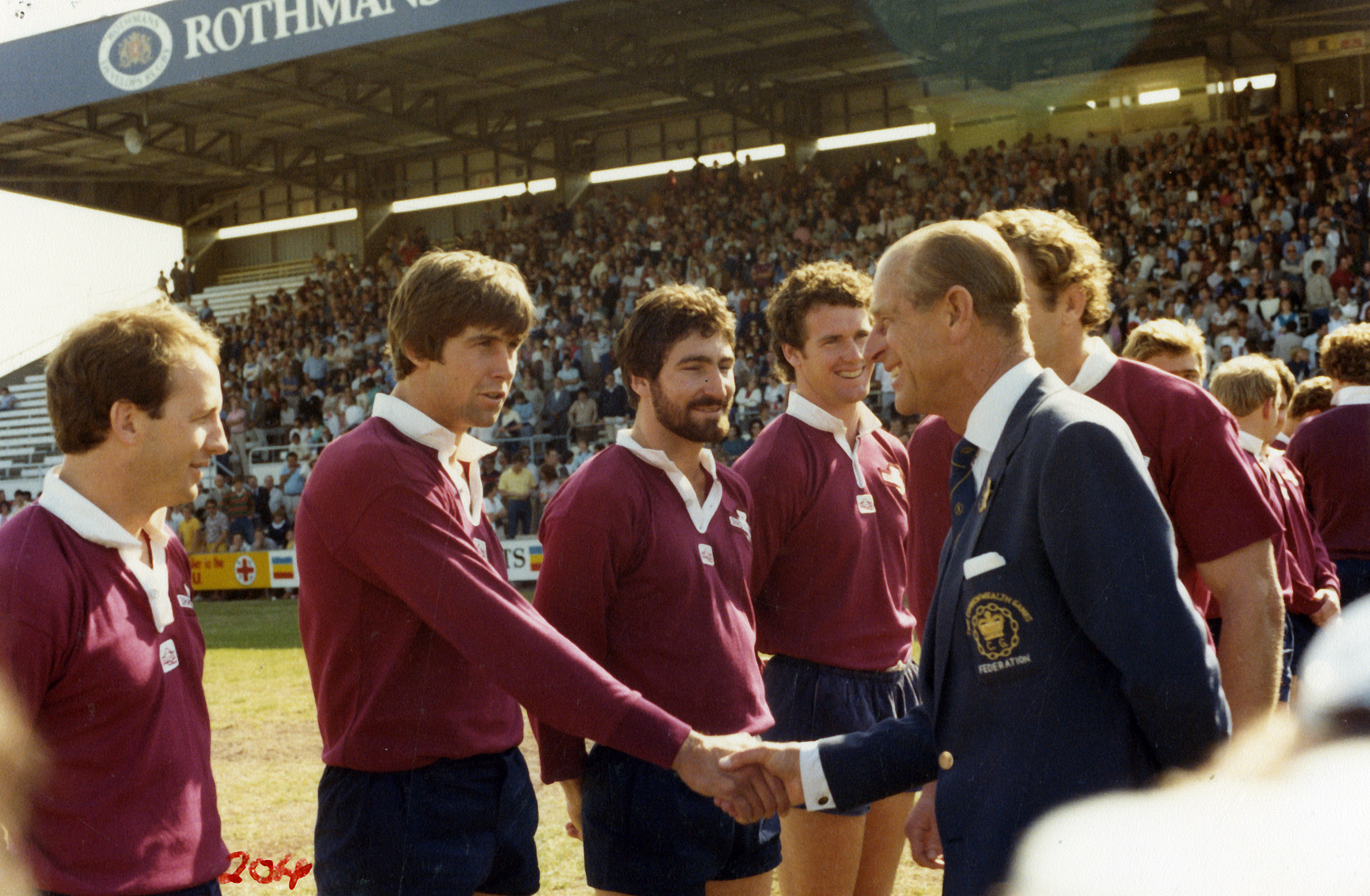
HRH The Duke of Edinburgh greeting the Queensland Rugby Union team at Ballymore Stadium, XII Commonwealth Games

From 1980 to 1997, the QRU offices were located underneath the McLean Stand at Ballymore. In 1997, the administration arm moved to Mallon Street, in the Brisbane suburb of Bowen Hills. The Reds staff, however, remained at Ballymore and were joined in 1998 by the staff of the Reds Rugby College. And finally, in 2004, the administration personnel were relocated to the newly built Rugby House at Ballymore, bringing the entire organisation back to one location.

=== Recent events ===
Rugby union in Queensland has seen extremely high growth since the 2003 Rugby World Cup.

There are approximately 200 rugby union clubs throughout Queensland and participation programs in more than 235 schools across the state, including a growing number of schools that have not traditionally been associated with rugby union. Community rugby in Queensland is supported by a large volunteer base, with more than 8,000 volunteers contributing to the operation and administration of clubs across the state.

== Participation ==
Registered players
2022/03	44,191
2023/04	21,234

== Queensland state team ==
Queensland Reds kit

=== Intercolony/Interstate matches ===
The year 1882 saw the first of many intercolony and interstate matches between Queensland and New South Wales rugby union teams. New South Wales took out the inaugural match, 28–4. The following year, Brisbane hosted its first intercolony match, defeating New South Wales 12–11 at the Eagle Farm Racecourse, which was also historically significant as the first rugby union game anywhere in the world where the referee used a whistle. Today, the Queensland team in Super Rugby, the Queensland Reds, face NSW, ACT, WA and Victoria representative teams home and away each season.

== National championships ==
The National Rugby Championship (NRC) was launched by the ARU in 2014, reinstating the national competition after an absence of six years. The previous competition was the Australian Rugby Championship (ARC) which was discontinued after only one season in 2007. The NRC is contested by nine professional teams from around Australia, with the season running from August through to November.

Queensland is represented by two teams in the NRC:

- Brisbane City, playing out of Ballymore
- Queensland Country, playing out of Bond University on the Gold Coast.

The teams are based in the same cities as the former ARC sides, the Ballymore Tornadoes, and East Coast Aces respectively. Both are managed by the QRU, with the coaching and training programs used at the Queensland Reds extended to players joining the NRC teams from the Reds and local Queensland clubs.

Brisbane City won the inaugural NRC competition, defeating Perth Spirit in the 2014 grand final.

== Competitions ==
=== Premier rugby ===
Queensland Premier Rugby is currently the highest level competition in the state and equivalent to the Shute Shield in NSW. There are currently nine teams that compete in the annual competition:

- Bond University
- Brothers Old Boys
- Easts
- GPS
- Norths
- Souths
- Sunnybank
- University of Queensland
- Wests

=== Country rugby ===
Country Heelers kit

The Queensland Country Rugby Union has eleven country sub-unions, each running their own club competitions during the year. The sub-unions are grouped into three regional divisions in Northern, Central, and Southern Queensland:

North Queensland

- Cairns
- Townsville
- Mount Isa
- Mackay

Central Queensland

- Rockhampton
- Central Highlands
- Western Queensland
- Wide Bay – selected from Bundaberg and District Rugby Union, plus teams from Fraser Coast, Gympie, and South Burnett.

South Queensland

- Sunshine Coast Rugby Union
- Darling Downs Rugby Union
- Gold Coast District Rugby Union

Sub-union teams compete in Regional Championships against other teams in their regional division. Representative sides from the three regions are then selected to play at the Queensland Country Championships.

Following the Country Championships, a representative Queensland Country Heelers team is selected by the Queensland Country Rugby Union to play regular fixtures including City-Country matches against Brisbane selections, and the "Battle of the Borders" Cup against the New South Wales Country Cockatoos.

=== Queensland State Cup ===
The Queensland State Cup was an early-season statewide premier competition that was run for just one season in 2009. It involved 16 Queensland teams; 9 Brisbane clubs and 7 teams based in the major sub-unions of Queensland Country. The competition ran prior to the Queensland Premier Rugby competition. Due to logistical issues the competition has now ceased.

Brisbane clubs
Brothers
Easts
GPS
Logan City
Norths
Souths
Sunnybank
University
Wests

Country teams
Cairns
Central Qld
Darling Downs
Gold Coast Breakers
Gold Coast Cyclones
Sunshine Coast
Townsville

=== Brisbane club rugby ===
Club rugby in Brisbane starts at an Under 7 years of age level and goes right up to an open age group level just below the premier level.

=== Suburban rugby ===
The grassroots rugby competition colloquially known as "Subbies" in Brisbane and South East Queensland is run by the Queensland Suburban Rugby Union (QSRU). The purpose of this competition is to provide community-based recreation for participants, irrespective of ability. It provides another tier of rugby behind the main Brisbane club competition.

The "Subbies" competition has around 1,000 players and 25 clubs competing across 3 divisions: As of 2014, the First Division clubs competing for the Barber Cup and Pegg Cup are:

- Brisbane Irish RFC
- Caboolture RFC
- Everton Park RFC
- Goodna RFC
- Ipswich RFC
- Pine Rivers Boars RFC
- Redlands RFC
- Springfield RFC
- Wynnum RUC

The QSRU also selects a Queensland Suburban team to play an annual match against New South Wales Suburban for the Barraclough Shield.

=== Women's rugby ===
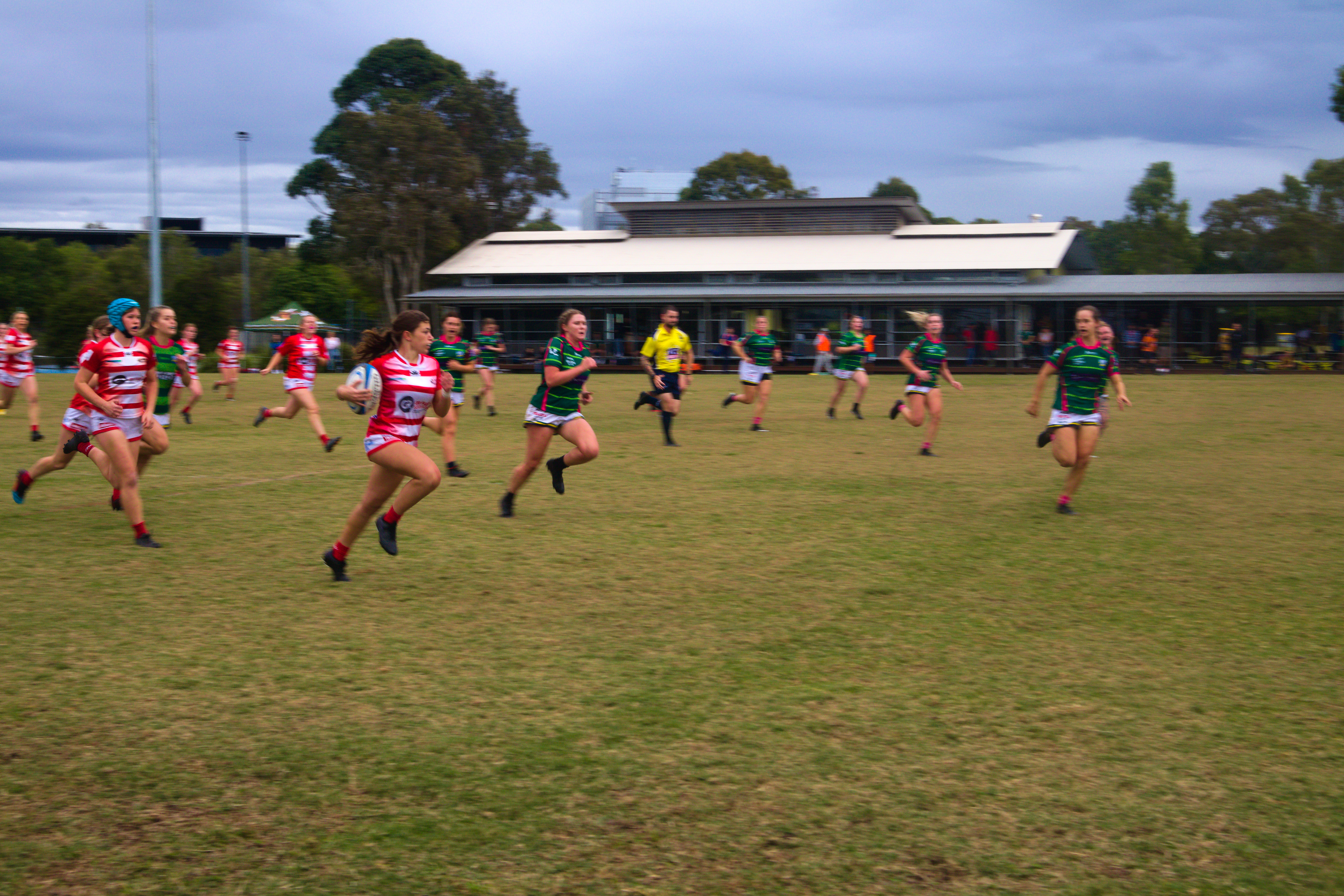
Women's rugby being played on the Sunshine Coast.

Club competitions for women's 15-a-side teams are run in Brisbane, Sunshine Coast and Cairns. The Queensland Rugby Union sends a Queensland side to the ARU's National Championship each year. Queensland also selects 7-a-side teams to compete in the National Sevens Championships and tournaments such as the Darwin Hottest Sevens.

The ten clubs in the Brisbane Women's competition, as of 2014, are:

- Albany Creek-GPS
- Colleges
- Goodna
- GPS
- Logan City
- Norths
- Redlands
- Sunnybank
- University of Queensland
- Wests

=== Schools and Junior rugby ===
The Queensland Rugby Football Schools Union (QRFSU) administers the game within Queensland schools and selects state teams for national championships at various age group levels, including the Australian Schools Rugby Championships.

Clubs for junior rugby players (up to 17 years of age) operate within the Queensland Junior Rugby Union (QJRU), which also holds state championships for representative teams from metropolitan and country regions.

==== Ballymore Cup ====
The Ballymore Cup is the largest school boys rugby competition in Queensland. It was founded to promote the sport of rugby across rural and metropolitan Queensland. The winner of the 2012 Ballymore Cup in the open age went to Rockhampton Grammar, and in the under-15's St Brendan's College, Yeppoon.

== Important Dates ==
- 1876 - Earliest record of rugby football being played in Queensland
- 1882 - First interstate matches between Queensland and NSW
- 1883 - QRU formally constituted (known as the Northern Rugby Union)
- 1883 - First interstate match in Brisbane; Queensland beating NSW 12–11 at Eagle Farm Racecourse
- 1887 - First organised club competition in Brisbane
- 1896 - First visit by a Queensland team to New Zealand
- 1899 - Queensland defeat Great Britain 11–3 at Exhibition Ground to record first win against an international team
- 1929 - Revival of Club competition after code was inactive since start of First World War
- 1949 - Australian Rugby Football Union formally constituted
- 1961 - Formation of Queensland Junior Rugby Union
- 1964 - Sub-districts Rugby Union started
- 1965 - Queensland Country Rugby Union formed
- 1966 - Barraclough Shield played for the first time between Queensland (QSRU) and New South Wales (NSWSRU)
- 1967 - First premiership at Ballymore Rugby ground
- 1971 - Queensland Schools Rugby Union formed
- 1980 - Queensland defeated New Zealand All Blacks, their first win against New Zealand
- 1982 - Queensland defeated NSW 41–7 in Centenary match
- 1987 - Ballymore hosts five inaugural World Cup matches including quarter and semi finals
- 1992 - Queensland Reds won Super Six
- 1994 - Reds Super 10 champions
- 1995 - Reds Super 10 champions
- 1996 - Rugby becomes professional
- 1996 - Reds finish season on top of Super 12 table
- 1999 - Reds finish season on top of Super 12 table
- 2005 - Chris Latham wins Australian Super 12 player of the year for a record 4th year
- 2006 - Reds begin playing all Super 14 matches at Suncorp Stadium
- 2011 - An epic Reds final win at Suncorp Stadium sees a "Nightmare wallabies revival" in time for the rugby world cup
- 2013 - Queensland Suburban / Sub-Districts celebrate 50 years of competition

== Sources ==
- Bird, Murray; Parker, Greg (2018). More of the Kangaroo: 150 Years of Australian Football in Queensland - 1866 to 2016. Morningside, Qld. ISBN 978-0-9943936-1-6. OCLC 1082363978.
- de Moore, Greg; Hess, Rob; Nicholson, Matthew; Stewart, Bob (2021). Australia's Game: The History of Australian Football. Hardie Grant Books. ISBN 9781-74379-657-3.
