= Queensland Rugby Union =

Sports governing body in Australia

- Sport: Rugby union
- Founded: 1883; 143 years ago
- Headquarters: Ballymore Stadium Brisbane, Queensland
- Patron: Paul de Jersey
- Chairman: Brett Clark
- President: Roger Gould
- Website: https://qld.rugby

The Queensland Rugby Union, or QRU, is the governing body for the sport of Rugby union in Queensland in Australia. It is a member and founding union of Rugby Australia.

== History ==
The QRU was founded in Brisbane in 1883 as the Northern Rugby Union, after breaking away from the Queensland Football Association before being formally constituted in 1893 when the name was changed to the Queensland Rugby Football Union.

The first 1883 season began with two clubs: Fireflies and Wanderers. Early intercolonials were played at Eagle Farm Racecourse. The competition boomed after the collapse of the QFA in 1890 with the majority of the remaining Australian rules players making the switch to rugby.

A combination of the introduction of rugby league and the impact of World War I saw the organisation disbanded in 1919, however it reformed after a decade in 1928.

=== Early clubs (1883-1893) ===
Club	Founded	Years active in union	Notes			
Fireflies	1884	1884-?				
Wanderers	1884	1884-?				
Wasps	1884	1884-?				
Sandgate	1886 May 10	1886-?				
Gracemere	1886	1890-?	Central Queensland association			
Wallaroo	1880	1885-	Formed under Australian rules			
Beenleigh	1887					
Toowoomba	1887 May 16					
Union Harriers	1888 February 4					
Fitzroy (Rockhampton)	1888 March 8		"The Brisbane Courier". The Brisbane Courier. Vol. XLIV, no. 9, 432. Queensland, Australia. 7 April 1888. p. 4 – via National Library of Australia.			
Boomerang	1888					
Oxley	1890	1890-?		Past Grammar	1887	?1891-
Aubigny	1889					
Warwick	1889	1889	Warwick Rugby Football Union in 1890			
Caxton	1889	1889	Warwick Rugby Football Union in 1890			
South-Eastern	1889	1889	Warwick Rugby Football Union in 1890			
Toowoomba Grammar School	1889	1889	Formed under Australian rules			
Arformas	?1890	1890-?				
Boomerangs	?1890	1890-?				
Moonlight	1890	1890-?				
Young Athenian	1890	1890-?				
Pittsworth	1890	1890-?				
Greenmount	1890	1890-?				
Paddington	1890	1890-?				
Bunya	1890	1890-?				
Oriental	1890	1890-?				
Rockhampton	1890	1890-?	Central Queensland association			
Wallaroo	1890	1890-?	Central Queensland association			
Mount Morgan	1890	1890-?	Central Queensland association			
Zingari	1890	1890-?	Central Queensland association			
Charters Towers	1890	1892-?				
Oxford	1890	1890-?				
Emu	1890	1890-?				
Toowong Ranger	1890	1890-?				
Townsville	1890	1890-?				
Ipswich	1892	1893-?				
Beserkers	1892	1892-?	Capricornia District			
Wanderers	1892	1892-?	Capricornia District			
Waratahs	1892	1892-?	Capricornia District			
Gordon	1893	1893-?				
Longreach	1893	1893-?				
Mountaineer	1893	1893-?				

== See also ==
- Queensland Reds
