= 2024 Wales rugby union tour of Australia =

- Coach: Warren Gatland
- Tour captain: Dewi Lake
- Top test point scorer(s): Dewi Lake (15); Ben Thomas (15)
- Top test try scorer: Dewi Lake (3)
Summary
P	W	D	L
Total
3	0	0	3
Test match
3	0	0	3
Opponent
P	W	D	L
Australia
2	0	0	2
South Africa
1	0	0	1

Tour chronology
- ← South Africa 2022 Japan 2025 →

The Wales national rugby union team toured Australia in July 2024 as part of the 2024 mid-year rugby union tests. The first test against the Australia national team was played on 6 July at the new Sydney Football Stadium in Sydney, New South Wales, with the second test following a week later at the Melbourne Rectangular Stadium in Melbourne, Victoria. A pre-tour match against South Africa on 22 June was announced in February 2024; the match will be played at Twickenham Stadium in London due to a clash with concerts by Taylor Swift and the Foo Fighters at the Millennium Stadium either side of the match.

After the two tests, Wales also played a tour match against the Queensland Reds at Lang Park in Brisbane.

It is Wales' first tour since touring South Africa in 2022 and their first tour of Australia since 2012. Their match against Queensland will be their first since 1991.

== Fixtures ==
Date	Venue	Home	Score	Away	Source
22 June 2024	Twickenham Stadium, London	South Africa	41–13	Wales	Report
6 July 2024	Sydney Football Stadium, Sydney	Australia	25–16	Wales	Report
13 July 2024	Melbourne Rectangular Stadium, Melbourne	Australia	36–28	Wales	Report
19 July 2024	Lang Park, Brisbane	Queensland Reds	35–36	Wales	Report

== Matches ==
=== South Africa vs Wales ===
The two teams named their line-ups for this game on 18 June. South Africa were missing their usual captain Siya Kolisi as well as the rest of their Europe-based players, so Pieter-Steph du Toit led the team. They were also without the Bulls players who had reached the final of the 2023–24 United Rugby Championship play-offs, resulting in debut starts for fly-half Jordan Hendrikse and wing Edwill van der Merwe, while uncapped lock Ben-Jason Dixon and utility back Sacha Feinberg-Mngomezulu were named on the bench. Prop Vincent Koch was named in the starting line-up to earn his 50th cap. For Wales, flanker Jac Morgan, who had co-captained the team with Dewi Lake at the 2023 Rugby World Cup, was ruled out of the tour with a hamstring injury, so Lake was named as captain, while James Botham filled in for Morgan in the back row after only being called up to the squad the day before. Lock James Ratti was also called up due to the unavailability of Cory Hill and named on the bench. New Scarlets signing Henry Thomas was named to start the match, but pulled out on 20 June with a foot injury; Keiron Assiratti was promoted from the bench to replace him among the starters, while Scarlets teammate Harri O'Connor came onto the bench.

South Africa opened the scoring early in the match as centre Jesse Kriel crossed for a try in the opening five minutes, converted by Hendrikse. Sam Costelow responded with a penalty for Wales, but they were soon reduced to 13 men as Rio Dyer and Aaron Wainwright were both sin-binned in the first quarter-hour, the latter offence resulting in a penalty try. Costelow missed the opportunity to close the gap further with another penalty shortly after, while Ellis Bevan fumbled a chance at a debut try following an interception by Liam Williams. After Dyer and Wainwright's return to the field, Wales took the numerical advantage as the game reached the half-hour mark, as Aphelele Fassi was shown a yellow card for a high boot on Taine Plumtree. They capitalised immediately as Dewi Lake claimed a loose ball and made his way over the line for a try, which Costelow converted before adding a penalty to reduce the deficit to a single point at half-time.

The first score of the second half came even quicker than in the first, as Makazole Mapimpi capitalised on a potential missed forward pass by the referee to cross for another converted try. Hendrikse then kicked South Africa's first penalty of the game to make it 24–13 with less than 10 minutes of the half gone. After a quiet next 15 minutes, South Africa put the seal on the win in the final quarter-hour, as Sacha Feinberg-Mngomezulu kicked a penalty from inside his own half before converting tries by Bongi Mbonambi and Edwill van der Merwe, who was named player of the match.

22 June 2024
14:00 BST (UTC+1)

South Africa	41–13	Wales
Try: Kriel 3'; Penalty try 14'; Mapimpi 41'; Mbonambi 68'; Van der Merwe 74'; Con: Hendrikse (2/2) 4', 42'; Feinberg-Mngomezulu (2/2) 69', 75'; Pen: Hendrikse (1/1) 49'; Feinberg-Mngomezulu (1/1) 65'	Report	Try: Lake 29' c Con: Costelow (1/1) 31'; Pen: Costelow (2/3) 6', 34'

Twickenham Stadium, London
Attendance: 60,000
Referee: Chris Busby (Ireland)

FB	15	Aphelele Fassi	(yellow card) 29'
RW	14	Edwill van der Merwe
OC	13	Jesse Kriel
IC	12	André Esterhuizen		(substituted off) 57'
LW	11	Makazole Mapimpi
FH	10	Jordan Hendrikse		(substituted off) 59'
SH	9	Faf de Klerk		(substituted off) 52'
N8	8	Evan Roos		(substituted off) 53'
BF	7	Pieter-Steph du Toit (c)
OF	6	Kwagga Smith
RL	5	Franco Mostert
LL	4	Eben Etzebeth		(substituted off) 61'
TP	3	Vincent Koch		(substituted off) 45'
HK	2	Malcolm Marx		(substituted off) 45'
LP	1	Ox Nché		(substituted off) 67'
Replacements:
HK	16	Bongi Mbonambi		(substituted in) 45'
PR	17	Ntuthuko Mchunu		(substituted in) 67'
PR	18	Frans Malherbe		(substituted in) 45'
LK	19	Salmaan Moerat		(substituted in) 61'
FL	20	Ben-Jason Dixon		(substituted in) 53'
SH	21	Grant Williams		(substituted in) 52'
FH	22	Sacha Feinberg-Mngomezulu		(substituted in) 59'
CE	23	Damian de Allende		(substituted in) 57'
Coach:
Rassie Erasmus

FB	15	Cameron Winnett
RW	14	Liam Williams
OC	13	Owen Watkin
IC	12	Mason Grady		(substituted off) 69'
LW	11	Rio Dyer	(yellow card) 10'
FH	10	Sam Costelow		(substituted off) 69'
SH	9	Ellis Bevan		(substituted off) 57'
N8	8	Aaron Wainwright	(yellow card) 14'
OF	7	James Botham
BF	6	Taine Plumtree		(substituted off) 73'
RL	5	Ben Carter
LL	4	Matthew Screech		(substituted off) 60'
TP	3	Keiron Assiratti		(substituted off) 39'
HK	2	Dewi Lake (c)		(substituted off) 66'
LP	1	Gareth Thomas		(substituted off) 61'
Replacements:
HK	16	Evan Lloyd		(substituted in) 66'
PR	17	Kemsley Mathias		(substituted in) 61'
PR	18	Harri O'Connor		(substituted in) 39'
LK	19	James Ratti		(substituted in) 60'
N8	20	Mackenzie Martin		(substituted in) 73'
SH	21	Gareth Davies		(substituted in) 57'
CE	22	Eddie James		(substituted in) 69'
FB	23	Jacob Beetham		(substituted in) 69'
Coach:
Warren Gatland

Player of the Match:
Edwill van der Merwe (South Africa)

Assistant referees:
Christophe Ridley (England)
Adam Leal (England)
Television match official:
Mark Patton (Ireland)
Foul play review officer:
Andrew Jackson (England)

=== Australia vs Wales (1st test) ===
Wales named their squad for the game on 3 July, making six changes from the team that faced South Africa two weeks earlier. In the forwards, prop Archie Griffin was given a first start for Wales in the city where he was born, while locks Christ Tshiunza and Dafydd Jenkins, and flanker Tommy Reffell also came in, all four having been unavailable against South Africa, replacing Keiron Assiratti, Matthew Screech, Ben Carter and James Botham, of whom only Botham made the bench to face Australia; in the backs, Josh Hathaway was named to make his debut, replacing Cameron Winnett in the back three with Liam Williams moving to full-back, while Ben Thomas replaced Sam Costelow at fly-half. Aaron Wainwright was named at number 8 to earn his 50th cap for Wales. Meanwhile, Australia named two debutants in their starting line-up – centre Josh Flook and lock Jeremy Williams – and a further five on the bench, Angus Blyth, Charlie Cale, Isaac Kailea, Tom Lynagh, Dylan Pietsch, while flanker Liam Wright captained the side for the first time.

Wales opened the scoring in the third minute of the match with a penalty from Ben Thomas, but Noah Lolesio levelled the scores for Australia a few minutes later, before putting them in front with another place-kick as the game hit the quarter-hour mark. Taniela Tupou scored the game's opening try five minutes later, while Gareth Thomas was sin-binned for an offence in the build-up; Lolesio converted the try to put Australia 13–3 up. Despite the numerical disadvantage, Wales continued to apply pressure, and shortly after Rio Dyer was denied a try for a knock-on, referee Pierre Brousset awarded them a penalty try after Australia collapsed a maul, resulting in a yellow card for flanker Fraser McReight.

That meant Wales went into half-time trailing by just three points, and just over five minutes past the break, Ben Thomas drew them level with his second penalty of the game; however, just six minutes later, Filipo Daugunu took advantage of a turnover from a Wales line-out to cross for his third international try, his first since Australia's 29–28 loss to Wales in Cardiff in 2021. A few minutes later, Botham came on for Wales and thought he had scored with his first touch, driving over from a line-out, only for the try to be ruled out for obstruction after the maul splintered. Ben Thomas was able to reduce the gap to two points as the match entered its final 15 minutes, but a solo try from Tom Wright ultimately sealed the win for Australia, as Tom Lynagh scored his first points in international rugby with the conversion. The defeat was Wales's eighth in a row, their longest losing streak since 2013, and saw them drop to 11th place in the World Rugby Rankings, their lowest ever position.

6 July 2024
19:45 AEST (UTC+10)

Australia	25–16	Wales
Try: Tupou 20'; Daugunu 52'; T. Wright 69'; Con: Lolesio (1/2) 22'; Lynagh (1/1) 70'; Pen: Lolesio (2/3) 7', 15'	Report	Try: Penalty try 25'; Pen: B. Thomas (3/3) 3', 46', 66'

Sydney Football Stadium, Sydney
Attendance: 35,945
Referee: Pierre Brousset (France)

FB	15	Tom Wright
RW	14	Andrew Kellaway
OC	13	Josh Flook
IC	12	Hunter Paisami
LW	11	Filipo Daugunu		(substituted off) 77'
FH	10	Noah Lolesio		(substituted off) 64'
SH	9	Jake Gordon		(substituted off) 64'
N8	8	Rob Valetini
OF	7	Fraser McReight	(yellow card) 25'
BF	6	Liam Wright (c)		(substituted off) 57'
RL	5	Lukhan Salakaia-Loto
LL	4	Jeremy Williams		(substituted off) 41'
TP	3	Taniela Tupou		(substituted off) 41'
HK	2	Matt Faessler		(substituted off) 66'
LP	1	James Slipper		(substituted off) 51'
Replacements:
HK	16	Billy Pollard		(substituted in) 66'
PR	17	Isaac Kailea		(substituted in) 51'
PR	18	Allan Alaalatoa		(substituted in) 41'
LK	19	Angus Blyth		(substituted in) 41'
FL	20	Charlie Cale		(substituted in) 57'
SH	21	Tate McDermott		(substituted in) 64'
FH	22	Tom Lynagh		(substituted in) 64'
WG	23	Dylan Pietsch		(substituted in) 77'
Coach:
Joe Schmidt

FB	15	Liam Williams		(substituted off) 64'
RW	14	Josh Hathaway
OC	13	Owen Watkin
IC	12	Mason Grady
LW	11	Rio Dyer
FH	10	Ben Thomas		(substituted off) 73'
SH	9	Ellis Bevan		(substituted off) 73'
N8	8	Aaron Wainwright
OF	7	Tommy Reffell
BF	6	Taine Plumtree		(substituted off) 57'
RL	5	Dafydd Jenkins		(substituted off) 66'
LL	4	Christ Tshiunza
TP	3	Archie Griffin		(substituted off) 75'
HK	2	Dewi Lake (c)		(substituted off) 73'
LP	1	Gareth Thomas	(yellow card) 20'	(substituted off) 41'
Replacements:
HK	16	Evan Lloyd		(substituted in) 73'
PR	17	Kemsley Mathias		(substituted in) 41'
PR	18	Harri O'Connor		(substituted in) 75'
LK	19	Cory Hill		(substituted in) 66'
FL	20	James Botham		(substituted in) 57'
SH	21	Kieran Hardy		(substituted in) 73'
FH	22	Sam Costelow		(substituted in) 73'
CE	23	Nick Tompkins		(substituted in) 64'
Coach:
Warren Gatland

Player of the Match:
Jake Gordon (Australia)

Assistant referees:
Ben O'Keeffe (New Zealand)
James Doleman (New Zealand)
Television match official:
Marius Jonker (South Africa)
Foul play review officer:
Glenn Newman (New Zealand)

=== Australia vs Wales (2nd test) ===
Wales named their squad for the second test on 11 July; they made two changes from the first test, bringing full-back Cameron Winnett and flanker James Botham into the starting line-up in place of the injured Josh Hathaway and Aaron Wainwright; they also made two positional changes, as Liam Williams moved from full-back to the right wing, while Taine Plumtree moved to number 8 from the blindside flank. Australia made just one change to their team, also enforced by injury, as Charlie Cale came in for captain Liam Wright; Rob Valetini moved to the blindside flank to accommodate Cale at number 8, and James Slipper took over from Wright as captain. Uncapped hooker Josh Nasser was named on the bench.

With this victory for Australia, they retained the James Bevan Trophy.

13 July 2024
19:45 AEST (UTC+10)

Australia	36–28	Wales
Try: Daugunu (2) 7', 67'; Gordon 25'; Alaalatoa 54'; Con: Lolesio (2/4) 8', 26'; Pen: Lolesio (3/3) 15', 31', 39'; Donaldson (1/1) 78'	Report	Try: Lake (2) 28', 36'; Williams 47'; Dyer 70'; Con: B. Thomas (3/3) 30', 37', 49'; Costelow (1/1) 71'

Melbourne Rectangular Stadium, Melbourne
Attendance: 21,932
Referee: Nika Amashukeli (Georgia)

FB	15	Tom Wright
RW	14	Andrew Kellaway
OC	13	Josh Flook
IC	12	Hunter Paisami
LW	11	Filipo Daugunu
FH	10	Noah Lolesio		(substituted off) 71'
SH	9	Jake Gordon		(substituted off) 62'
N8	8	Charlie Cale		(substituted off) 59'
OF	7	Fraser McReight
BF	6	Rob Valetini
RL	5	Lukhan Salakaia-Loto	(yellow card) 35'
LL	4	Jeremy Williams		(substituted off) 59'
TP	3	Taniela Tupou		(substituted off) 40'
HK	2	Matt Faessler		(substituted off) 61'
LP	1	James Slipper (c)		(substituted off) 56'
Replacements:
HK	16	Josh Nasser		(substituted in) 61'
PR	17	Isaac Aedo Kailea		(substituted in) 56'
PR	18	Allan Alaalatoa		(substituted in) 40'
LK	19	Angus Blyth		(substituted in) 59'
FL	20	Langi Gleeson		(substituted in) 59'
SH	21	Nic White		(substituted in) 62'
FH	22	Ben Donaldson		(substituted in) 71'
WG	23	Dylan Pietsch
Coach:
Joe Schmidt

FB	15	Cameron Winnett
RW	14	Liam Williams	(substituted off) 69'
OC	13	Owen Watkin
IC	12	Mason Grady
LW	11	Rio Dyer
FH	10	Ben Thomas	(substituted off) 61'
SH	9	Ellis Bevan	(substituted off) 61'
N8	8	Taine Plumtree
OF	7	Tommy Reffell
BF	6	James Botham
RL	5	Dafydd Jenkins	(substituted off) 65'
LL	4	Christ Tshiunza
TP	3	Archie Griffin
HK	2	Dewi Lake (c)	(substituted off) 69'
LP	1	Gareth Thomas
Replacements:
HK	16	Evan Lloyd	(substituted in) 69'
PR	17	Kemsley Mathias
PR	18	Harri O'Connor
LK	19	Cory Hill	(substituted in) 65'
N8	20	Mackenzie Martin
SH	21	Kieran Hardy	(substituted in) 61'
FH	22	Sam Costelow	(substituted in) 61'
CE	23	Nick Tompkins	(substituted in) 69'
Coach:
Warren Gatland

Player of the Match:
Rob Valetini (Australia)

Assistant referees:
Matthew Carley (England)
Pierre Brousset (France)
Television match official:
Glenn Newman (New Zealand)
Foul play review officer:
Marius Jonker (South Africa)

=== Queensland Reds vs Wales ===
19 July 2024
19:55 AEST (UTC+10)

Queensland Reds	35–36	Wales
Try: Asiata (3) 13', 27', 51'; Grealy (2) 59', 69'; Con: O'Connor (5/5) 14', 28', 53', 61', 70'	Report	Try: Griffin 4'; Grace 18'; Dyer 20'; Tshiunza 38'; Tompkins 45'; Hardy 79'; Con: Costelow (3/6) 19', 21', 46'

Lang Park, Brisbane
Attendance: 23,164
Referee: Damon Murphy (Australia)

FB	15	(Australia) Jock Campbell (c)
RW	14	(Australia) Floyd Aubrey	(substituted off) 47'
OC	13	(Australia) Tim Ryan
IC	12	(New Zealand) Dre Pakeho
LW	11	(Australia) Mac Grealy
FH	10	(Australia) James O'Connor
SH	9	(Australia) Louis Werchon	(substituted off) 79'
N8	8	(New Zealand) Joe Brial	(substituted off) 79'
OF	7	(Australia) John Bryant
BF	6	(Australia) Seru Uru
RL	5	(Australia) Ryan Smith
LL	4	(Australia) Connor Vest	(substituted off) 51'
TP	3	(Samoa) Jeffery Toomaga-Allen	(substituted off) 79'
HK	2	(Australia) Richie Asiata	(substituted off) 63'
LP	1	(Australia) Sef Fa'agase	(substituted off) 53'
Replacements:
HK	16	(Cook Islands) George Blake	(substituted in) 63'
PR	17	(Australia) Matt Gibbon	(substituted in) 53'
PR	18	(Australia) Massimo De Lutiis	(substituted in) 79'
LK	19	(Australia) Josh Canham	(substituted in) 51'
FL	20	(Australia) Connor Anderson	(substituted in) 79'
SH	21	(Australia) Will Cartwright	(substituted in) 79'
FH	22	(Australia) Mason Gordon
WG	23	(Australia) Lachie Anderson	(substituted in) 47'
Coach:
Les Kiss

FB	15	Cameron Winnett
RW	14	Rio Dyer
OC	13	Nick Tompkins
IC	12	Eddie James		(substituted off) 71'
LW	11	Regan Grace		(substituted off) 75'
FH	10	Sam Costelow
SH	9	Gareth Davies (c)		(substituted off) 71'
N8	8	Mackenzie Martin		(substituted off) 29'	(substituted in) 37'	(substituted off) 71'
OF	7	Taine Plumtree
BF	6	Christ Tshiunza		(substituted off) 45'
RL	5	Dafydd Jenkins
LL	4	Matthew Screech
TP	3	Archie Griffin		(substituted off) 61'
HK	2	Evan Lloyd	(yellow card) 25'
LP	1	Kemsley Mathias		(substituted off) 54'
Replacements:
HK	16	Efan Daniel		(substituted in) 29'	(substituted off) 37'
PR	17	Corey Domachowski		(substituted in) 54'
PR	18	Harri O'Connor		(substituted in) 61'
HK	19	Dewi Lake				(substituted in) 71'
FL	20	Tommy Reffell		(substituted in) 45'
SH	21	Kieran Hardy		(substituted in) 71'
CE	22	Ben Thomas		(substituted in) 75'
CE	23	Mason Grady		(substituted in) 71'
Coach:
Warren Gatland

Assistant referees:
Matt Kellehan (Australia)
Jeremy Markey (Australia)
Television match official:
Graham Cooper (Australia)

== Squads ==
=== Wales ===
Wales coach Warren Gatland named a squad of 36 players for the tour on 3 June 2024, including four uncapped players in Cardiff Rugby scrum-half Ellis Bevan and full-back Jacob Beetham, Ospreys wing Keelan Giles and Gloucester wing/full-back Josh Hathaway. Also included were Japan-based lock Cory Hill and full-back Liam Williams. Cardiff wing Theo Cabango missed out on selection after suffering a hamstring injury in their Judgement Day game against the Ospreys on 1 June. Scrum-half Tomos Williams suffered an ankle injury in March 2024 and missed out on selection for a Wales test for the first time since March 2022. Uncapped Scarlets centre Eddie James was a notable omission from the original squad, but he was added to the squad on 6 June. Cardiff flanker James Botham was added to the squad on 17 June. Uncapped Ospreys lock James Ratti was added to the squad on 18 June due to the unavailability of Hill for the South Africa test. Bath wing Regan Grace was called up to replace the injured Giles on 20 June. Hooker Sam Parry was a surprise withdrawal from the squad in the week of the South Africa test, having left the training camp after being told by Gatland that he was only going to be considered as cover for the other three hookers; Cardiff's Efan Daniel was called up in his place. The travelling squad for the tour to Australia was announced on 24 June, with Keiron Assiratti, Elliot Dee and Henry Thomas as the omissions; Daniel, Grace and Hathaway were included.

Caps and ages are as of 22 June 2024, the day of the first match of the tour.

Player	Position	Date of birth (age)	Caps	Club/province
Efan Daniel	Hooker	14 December 2002 (aged 21)	0	(Wales) Cardiff
Elliot Dee	Hooker	7 March 1994 (aged 30)	51	(Wales) Dragons
Dewi Lake (c)	Hooker	16 May 1999 (aged 25)	12	(Wales) Ospreys
Evan Lloyd	Hooker	28 December 2001 (aged 22)	2	(Wales) Cardiff
Sam Parry	Hooker	17 December 1991 (aged 32)	7	(Wales) Ospreys
Keiron Assiratti	Prop	30 June 1997 (aged 26)	6	(Wales) Cardiff
Corey Domachowski	Prop	11 September 1996 (aged 27)	10	(Wales) Cardiff
Archie Griffin	Prop	24 July 2001 (aged 22)	1	(England) Bath
Dillon Lewis	Prop	4 January 1996 (aged 28)	57	(England) Harlequins
Kemsley Mathias	Prop	29 July 1999 (aged 24)	2	(Wales) Scarlets
Harri O'Connor	Prop	25 October 2000 (aged 23)	1	(Wales) Scarlets
Gareth Thomas	Prop	1 November 1993 (aged 30)	30	(Wales) Ospreys
Henry Thomas	Prop	30 October 1991 (aged 32)	4	(France) Castres
Ben Carter	Lock	23 January 2001 (aged 23)	11	(Wales) Dragons
Cory Hill	Lock	10 February 1992 (aged 32)	32	(Japan) Secom Rugguts
Dafydd Jenkins	Lock	5 December 2002 (aged 21)	17	(England) Exeter Chiefs
James Ratti	Lock	14 October 1997 (aged 26)	0	(Wales) Ospreys
Matthew Screech	Lock	24 October 1992 (aged 31)	1	(Wales) Dragons
Christ Tshiunza	Lock	9 January 2002 (aged 22)	10	(England) Exeter Chiefs
James Botham	Back row	22 February 1998 (aged 26)	10	(Wales) Cardiff
Mackenzie Martin	Back row	26 October 2003 (aged 20)	3	(Wales) Cardiff
Jac Morgan	Back row	21 January 2000 (aged 24)	15	(Wales) Ospreys
Taine Plumtree	Back row	9 March 2000 (aged 24)	2	(Wales) Scarlets
Tommy Reffell	Back row	27 April 1999 (aged 25)	18	(England) Leicester Tigers
Aaron Wainwright	Back row	25 November 1997 (aged 26)	48	(Wales) Dragons
Ellis Bevan	Scrum-half	10 March 2000 (aged 24)	0	(Wales) Cardiff
Gareth Davies	Scrum-half	18 August 1990 (aged 33)	76	(Wales) Scarlets
Kieran Hardy	Scrum-half	30 November 1995 (aged 28)	21	(Wales) Scarlets
Sam Costelow	Fly-half	10 January 2001 (aged 23)	12	(Wales) Scarlets
Mason Grady	Centre	10 March 2002 (aged 22)	11	(Wales) Cardiff
Eddie James	Centre	10 August 2002 (aged 21)	0	(Wales) Scarlets
Ben Thomas	Centre	25 November 1998 (aged 25)	2	(Wales) Cardiff
Nick Tompkins	Centre	16 February 1995 (aged 29)	36	(England) Saracens
Owen Watkin	Centre	12 October 1996 (aged 27)	38	(Wales) Ospreys
Rio Dyer	Wing	21 December 1999 (aged 24)	19	(Wales) Dragons
Keelan Giles	Wing	29 January 1997 (aged 27)	0	(Wales) Ospreys
Regan Grace	Wing	12 December 1996 (aged 27)	0	(England) Bath
Josh Hathaway	Wing	19 October 2003 (aged 20)	0	(England) Gloucester
Liam Williams	Wing	9 April 1991 (aged 33)	89	(Japan) Kubota Spears
Jacob Beetham	Fullback	18 April 2001 (aged 23)	0	(Wales) Cardiff
Cameron Winnett	Fullback	7 January 2003 (aged 21)	5	(Wales) Cardiff

=== Australia ===
Australia named a 38-man squad for their tests against Wales and Georgia on 21 June 2024, including 13 uncapped players and 35-year-old fly-half Kurtley Beale, who had not played for Australia since their 29–28 loss to Wales in November 2021; however, Beale suffered a ruptured Achilles tendon in a club match for Randwick against Eastern Suburbs and was ruled out of the series. Uncapped centre David Feliuai was ruled out of the first test for personal reasons, and uncapped Waratahs centre Joey Walton was called up in his place.

Caps and ages are as of 6 July 2024, the day of the first test between Australia and Wales.

Player	Position	Date of birth (age)	Caps	Club/province
Matt Faessler	Hooker	21 December 1998 (aged 25)	5	(Australia) Reds
Josh Nasser	Hooker	23 June 1999 (aged 25)	0	(Australia) Reds
Billy Pollard	Hooker	12 September 2001 (aged 22)	1	(Australia) Brumbies
Allan Alaalatoa	Prop	28 January 1994 (aged 30)	66	(Australia) Brumbies
Alex Hodgman	Prop	16 July 1993 (aged 30)	0	(Australia) Reds
Isaac Aedo Kailea	Prop	13 July 2000 (aged 23)	0	(Australia) Rebels
Zane Nonggorr	Prop	30 March 2001 (aged 23)	4	(Australia) Reds
James Slipper	Prop	6 June 1989 (aged 35)	134	(Australia) Brumbies
Taniela Tupou	Prop	10 May 1996 (aged 28)	51	(Australia) Reds
Angus Blyth	Lock	4 March 1998 (aged 26)	0	(Australia) Reds
Nick Frost	Lock	10 October 1999 (aged 24)	15	(Australia) Brumbies
Lukhan Salakaia-Loto	Lock	19 September 1996 (aged 27)	30	(Australia) Rebels
Ryan Smith	Lock	30 September 1996 (aged 27)	0	(Australia) Reds
Jeremy Williams	Lock	2 December 2000 (aged 23)	0	(Australia) Waratahs
Charlie Cale	Back row	6 October 2000 (aged 23)	0	(Australia) Brumbies
Langi Gleeson	Back row	21 July 2001 (aged 22)	5	(Australia) Waratahs
Tom Hooper	Back row	1 January 2002 (aged 22)	7	(Australia) Brumbies
Fraser McReight	Back row	19 February 1999 (aged 25)	17	(Australia) Reds
Rob Valetini	Back row	3 September 1998 (aged 25)	39	(Australia) Brumbies
Harry Wilson	Back row	22 November 1999 (aged 24)	12	(Australia) Reds
Liam Wright	Back row	6 November 1997 (aged 26)	5	(Australia) Reds
Jake Gordon	Scrum-half	6 July 1993 (aged 31)	20	(Australia) Waratahs
Tate McDermott	Scrum-half	18 September 1998 (aged 25)	29	(Australia) Reds
Nic White	Scrum-half	13 June 1990 (aged 34)	66	(Australia) Brumbies
Ben Donaldson	Fly-half	5 April 1999 (aged 25)	7	(Australia) Waratahs
Noah Lolesio	Fly-half	18 December 1999 (aged 24)	20	(Australia) Brumbies
Tom Lynagh	Fly-half	14 April 2003 (aged 21)	0	(Australia) Reds
David Feliuai	Centre	16 May 1997 (aged 27)	0	(Australia) Rebels
Josh Flook	Centre	22 September 2001 (aged 22)	0	(Australia) Reds
Len Ikitau	Centre	1 October 1998 (aged 25)	29	(Australia) Brumbies
Hunter Paisami	Centre	10 April 1999 (aged 25)	24	(Australia) Reds
Hamish Stewart	Centre	3 March 1998 (aged 26)	0	(Australia) Force
Filipo Daugunu	Wing	4 March 1995 (aged 29)	7	(Australia) Rebels
Darby Lancaster	Wing	23 April 2003 (aged 21)	0	(Australia) Rebels
Dylan Pietsch	Wing	23 April 1998 (aged 26)	0	(Australia) Waratahs
Kurtley Beale	Fullback	6 January 1989 (aged 35)	95	(Australia) Force
Andrew Kellaway	Fullback	12 October 1995 (aged 28)	26	(Australia) Rebels
Tom Wright	Fullback	21 July 1997 (aged 26)	23	(Australia) Brumbies

== See also ==
- 2024 mid-year rugby union tests
- 2024 England rugby union tour of New Zealand
- 2024 France rugby union tour of Argentina and Uruguay
- 2024 Ireland rugby union tour of South Africa
