= Alice Evans (disambiguation) =

Alice Evans is a British-American actress.

Alice Evans may also refer to:

- Alice Catherine Evans (1881–1975), American microbiologist
- Alice Evans (footballer) (born 1994), Welsh international footballer
- Alice Evans, a character in 3:10 to Yuma
- Alice Evans, a character in Deadline
- Alice Margaret Evans (1927–1981), British plant breeder
