= Liam Wright =

Australia international rugby union player (born 1997)

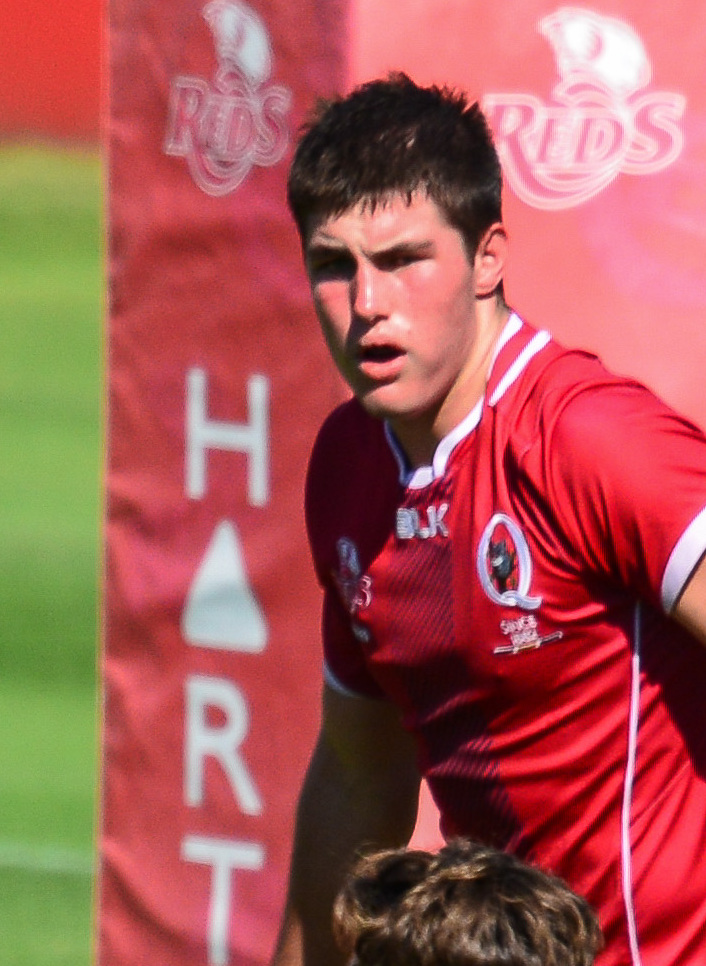
- Wright with the Reds U20s in 2016
- Born: 6 November 1997 (age 29) Durban, KwaZulu-Natal, South Africa
- Height: 1.95 m (6 ft 5 in)
- Weight: 115 kg (18 st 2 lb; 254 lb)
- School: Anglican Church Grammar School
- University: Queensland University of Technology

Rugby union career
- Position: Flanker
- Current team: Ospreys
Amateur team(s)
Years	Team	Apps	(Points)
2015–2016	Easts Tigers		
- Correct as of 21 October 2017
Senior career
Years	Team	Apps	(Points)
2016–2019	Queensland Country	12	(0)
2018–2025	Reds	87	(55)
2026–	Ospreys	4	(5)
- Correct as of 15 June 2026
International career
Years	Team	Apps	(Points)
2016–2017	Australia U20	9	(5)
2019–2024	Australia	6	(0)
- Correct as of 6 July 2024

Liam Wright (born 6 November 1997) is an Australian rugby union player currently playing for the Ospreys in the United Rugby Championship (URC). He has most recently played for the Queensland Reds in the Super Rugby, being the teams co-captain alongside Tate McDermott. He also played for Queensland Country in the National Rugby Championship (NRC). His usual position is flanker. He has also captained Australia in one international Test match, receiving the honour under coach Joe Schmidt for the Wallabies' 2024 Test series against Wales.

== Early life ==
Wright was born in Durban, KwaZulu-Natal, South Africa in 1997 to mother Lee, and father Glynn, an accountant. Growing up, Wright and his father were passionate about rugby. He would reportedly wake at 5 a.m. on Sunday morning and watch every Super Rugby match they'd pre-recorded overnight. Wright was reportedly a big fan of the Sharks franchise based in the same city he was born, and even stated to Rugby.com.au that "I probably imagined myself more in a Sharks jersey and watched the Springboks a bit more growing up."

In 2004, at 7-years-old, Wright's family moved to Australia, settling in Sydney, New South Wales. By age 14, the Wright family had moved to Brisbane where Liam began his education at Anglican Church Grammar School ("Churchie"). Wright had been in the school's 1st XV squad throughout 2014 and 2015. In an article about Liam's life following his departure from the Queensland Reds, the InDaily reported that he was a part of a star-studded squad in his youth days: "Wright was a key member of the "uber" Churchie 1st XV team that dominated GPS rugby in 2014–15 and courtesy of Kalyn Ponga, featured widely on YouTube. Angus Scott-Young, another Op 1 student, Brodie Croft, Mack Mason, Jaydn Su'A, Izaia Perese, prop Richie Asiata, now a Reds Squad member – it was a heck of a team."

== Career ==
=== Reds ===
Wright began his senior rugby career with Easts Tigers, playing Queensland Premier Rugby in 2016. He was selected in the Australian Under-20 team in 2016 and 2017 for the World Championships in Italy and Georgia. Wright joined the Queensland Country team and made his debut in Australia's National Rugby Championship (NRC) in October 2016, playing against the NSW Country Eagles.

In 2017, he signed a two-year professional contract with the Queensland Reds for the following two seasons. After impressing national selectors during the NRC in 2017, Wright played for Australia against the Barbarians in Sydney, and was then chosen as one of two development players in the Wallabies tour squad for the 2017 end-of-year rugby union internationals.

Wright made his Super Rugby debut for the Reds off the bench in the team's first match of the 2018 season, playing against the Rebels in Melbourne.

He was selected in the Australia squad for the Bledisloe Cup in 2019, and made his test debut against New Zealand at Eden Park in August that year.

After suffering a run of injuries, Wright returned to the Wallabies fold under newly appointed coach Joe Schmidt in July 2024. He was made captain for their first test against Wales on their two-Test tour of Australia.

In October 2025, after eight years at the Queensland Reds, Wright departed the club after a breakdown on contractual agreement terms. Wright had played just 58 minutes of rugby in 2025 after sustaining a shoulder injury against Wales on their 2024 tour of Australia.

=== Ospreys ===
In June 2026, the Ospreys club in Wales, one of the four regional teams, announced Wright as their newest signing ahead of the 2026–27 United Rugby Championship season. Wright joined fellow Australians Ryan Smith and Lalakai Foketi. WalesOnline described the signing as a "coup", noting that the Welsh Rugby Union (WRU) had identified Wright as a potential international recruit. Eligible to represent the Wales national team through his Welsh grandfather, Wright is expected to satisfy the international stand-down requirements by 2027, having not represented Australia since mid-2024, thereby making him available for Welsh selection.

== International career ==
In 2016, Wright represented the Australia under 20s team at the 2016 U20 Championship in England. Wright featured as the teams primary lock forward, and scored one try for the side as they finished sixth.

In July 2019, Wright was named in Australia's 31-man squad for the 2019 Rugby Championship, which was shortened due to the upcoming 2019 Rugby World Cup. Wright made his international debut on 17 August 2019 against New Zealand in the second Bledisloe Cup Rugby World Cup warm-up Test. Wright, who replaced Lukhan Salakaia-Loto in the 60th minute, was named Wallaby #928. Wright played in the Wallabies' following warm-up Test against Samoa at Western Sydney Stadium, although he was not called up for the eventual Rugby World Cup squad in Japan.

The following year (2020), Wright was called up to the Wallabies squad for their Bledisloe Cup Tests, and later Tri Nations Series, which was hosted in Australia due to logistical issues stemming from the COVID-19 pandemic. Wright played in three matches, all coming off the bench.

After a three-year absence from international rugby, Wright was named in the Wallabies team ahead of the two-Test Welsh tour in June 2024. Days before the first Test on 6 July, Wright was named team captain by new coach Joe Schmidt. Wright, who had played just five Tests and was the least experienced Australian captain since Ken Catchpole in the 1961, said he was taken by surprise but also mentioned that it was "a massive honour and a really special moment." Wright captained Australia to a 25–16 win at Sydney Football Stadium, for which they went on to win the series 2–0. However, Wright did not feature again for the Wallabies for the remainder of the year.
