= Taine Basham =

Welsh rugby union player (born 1999)

- Full name: Taine Owen Basham
- Born: 2 November 1999 (age 27) Pontypool, Wales
- Height: 1.83 m (6 ft 0 in)
- Weight: 106 kg (234 lb; 16 st 10 lb)
- School: Abersychan School

Rugby union career
- Position(s): Flanker, Number 8
- Current team: Cardiff Rugby
Senior career
Years	Team	Apps	(Points)
2017–2025	Dragons	109	(105)
2025–	Cardiff Rugby	22	(20)
International career
Years	Team	Apps	(Points)
2018–2019	Wales U20	12	(25)
2018	Wales 7s	12	(5)
2021–	Wales	18	(15)
- Correct as of 14 November 2026

Taine Owen Basham (born 2 November 1999) is a Welsh professional rugby union player who plays as a flanker for United Rugby Championship club Cardiff Rugby and the Wales national team.

== Club career ==
Basham started out at junior level with Talywain and has been developed in the Dragons Academy. Having played for both Bedwas RFC and Cross Keys RFC in the Premiership, Basham made his debut against Scarlets in January 2018 and went on to make nine appearances in the 2018/19 season. This concluded with Basham being named the Young Player of the Season at the region's end-of-season awards.

Basham would score his first Dragons try in the defeat to Connacht in November 2018.

Basham began the 2019/20 season in outstanding form, scoring tries in each of his first three starts of the season. This was followed by a first career hattrick in the Challenge Cup victory over Castres. Basham would end the season having scored 9 tries in 20 games.

On 9 October 2021, Basham was named man of the match in the Dragons 35–22 victory over Connacht, their first win at the Sportsground since 2004. Soon after, he signed an extension with the Dragons.

In November 2023, Basham received a red card and was sent off against Leinster, and was banned for four matches.

In April 2024, Basham again extended his contract with the Dragons, despite interest from other clubs.

On 4 October 2024, Basham scored a try and was named man of the match in a defeat to the Sharks, as he returned from early season injury issues.

He made his 100th competitive appearance for the Dragons on 6 December 2024.

In 2025, Basham left the Dragons, and signed for rivals Cardiff Rugby for the 2025/26 season.

== International career ==
Basham was capped as a Wales under-20 international. He was selected in the senior Wales squad to face the Barbarians in the uncapped international on 30 November 2019. On 5 February 2020 he was called up to the Wales 2020 Six Nations squad, though he did not receive a cap. Basham had to wait until June 2021 to receive his third call to the Wales squad for the tests against Canada and Argentina. Basham made his Wales debut as a replacement in the 68–12 win over Canada, crossing for two debut tries.

During the 2021 Autumn internationals Basham started all four matches for Wales, and was named as man of the match in the final test, a 29–28 win over Australia.

Basham scored his third try for Wales against Ireland in the opening match of the 2022 Six Nations Championship, a game that Wales lost 29–7. After starting the following two matches against Scotland and England, Basham was dropped from the team for the final two matches of the tournament.

Basham was part of the squad for the 2022 Wales rugby union tour of South Africa, and came off the bench in the third test.

After suffering a dislocated elbow while playing for the Dragons, Basham was ruled out of the 2022 end-of-year rugby union internationals. He missed out on selection for the 2023 Six Nations Championship, but was recalled to the training squad for the 2023 Rugby World Cup, and subsequently named in the final selection.

Basham was retained in the squad for the 2024 Six Nations Championship. Basham was omitted from the 2024 Wales rugby union tour of Australia and 2024 end-of-year rugby union internationals.

== Career statistics ==
=== List of international tries ===
No.	Date	Venue	Opponent	Score	Result	Competition
1	3 July 2021	Millennium Stadium, Cardiff, Wales	Canada	52–5	68–12	2021 July rugby union tests
2	3 July 2021	Millennium Stadium, Cardiff, Wales	Canada	59–5	68–12	2021 July rugby union tests
3	5 February 2022	Aviva Stadium, Dublin, Ireland	Ireland	5–29	7–29	2022 Six Nations Championship

as of 5 February 2022
