= Ellis Bevan =

Welsh rugby union player (born 2000)

- Born: 10 March 2000 (age 26) Solihull, England
- Height: 1.80 m (5 ft 11 in)
- Weight: 92 kg (14.5 st; 203 lb)
- School: Bryanston School
- University: Cardiff Metropolitan University

Rugby union career
- Position: Scrum-half
Senior career
Years	Team	Apps	(Points)
2021–	Cardiff Rugby	47	(25)
International career
Years	Team	Apps	(Points)
2020	Wales U20s	5	(5)
2024–	Wales	3	(5)

Ellis Bevan (born 10 March 2000) is a Welsh rugby union player, currently playing for United Rugby Championship side Cardiff Rugby as a scrum-half.

== Club career ==
=== Cardiff Rugby ===
Bevan signed for Cardiff during the 2020–21 season from Cardiff Metropolitan University. He made his Cardiff debut in Round 1 of the Pro14 Rainbow Cup against Ospreys, scoring a try.

On 18 April 2024, Bevan signed a long-term contract extension with Cardiff.

During the 2025–26 season, Bevan joined Bristol Bears on short-term loan. Bevan made his first appearance in a Premiership Rugby Cup fixture against Bath, and scored a try.

== International career ==
=== Wales U20 ===
Bevan was named in the Wales U20 squad for the 2020 Six Nations Under 20s Championship. Bevan scored a try in the victory over France U20.

=== Wales ===
Bevan was called up to the senior Wales squad by Warren Gatland in June 2024 for the tour to Australia. Bevan made his debut on 22 June 2024, starting against South Africa. Bevan was retained in the squad for the 2024 end-of-year rugby union internationals, and scored his first try for Wales, against Fiji. Bevan was named in the squad for the 2025 Six Nations Championship, but did not make an appearance.
