= Matt Philip =

Australia international rugby union player

- Full name: Matthew Philip
- Born: 7 March 1994 (age 32) Mona Vale, New South Wales, Australia
- Height: 2.01 m (6 ft 7 in)
- Weight: 117 kg (18 st 6 lb; 258 lb)
- School: St Augustine's College, Sydney

Rugby union career
- Position: Lock
Amateur team(s)
Years	Team	Apps	(Points)
2014−2016	Sydney University	19	(0)
Senior career
Years	Team	Apps	(Points)
2014−2015	Sydney Stars	15	(10)
2016	Southland	10	(0)
2017	Perth Spirit	3	(0)
2018	Melbourne Rising	3	(0)
2020–2021	Pau	13	(10)
2023–2025	Yokohama Canon Eagles	35	(10)
- Correct as of 4 July 2023
Super Rugby
Years	Team	Apps	(Points)
2016−2017	Force	13	(5)
2018–2020	Rebels	46	(30)
2022–2023	Rebels	17	(15)
2025–	Waratahs	13	(0)
- Correct as of 30 May 2026
International career
Years	Team	Apps	(Points)
2012	Australia Schoolboys		
2014	Australia U20	8	(0)
2017–	Australia	31	(0)
2025	ANZAC XV	1	(0)
- Correct as of 24 September 2023

Matt Philip (born 7 March 1994) is an Australian rugby union footballer who currently plays as a lock for the New South Wales Waratahs in the Super Rugby and the Australia national team. In 2026 Philip, whom was born in Sydney, was named team captain of the Waratahs for the first time. Philip previously played for the Melbourne Rebels and the Western Force in the Super Rugby; French Top 14 side Pau; and Japanese team Yokohama Canon Eagles. Philip made his international debut in 2017 for Australia, having previously represented Australia in schoolboys rugby, and the Australia under-20s team.

== Early life ==
Philip was born and raised on Sydney's Northern Beaches in suburb of Mona Vale, New South Wales, Australia. He attended St Augustine's College, Sydney. Philip represented Australia at schoolboy level in 2012, and under-20 level in 2014.

== Rugby career ==
Philip initially made his way in the game turning out for Sydney University in the Shute Shield where his form earned him a call-up to the Sydney Stars squad ahead of the inaugural National Rugby Championship in 2014. He made 15 appearances for the Stars across two seasons and scored two tries in that time.

Philip's rise to the Super Rugby level was a swift one as an injury crisis in the Force's second row saw him cross Australia from Sydney to Perth to train with them during the 2016 mid-year rugby union internationals break. He was subsequently named in the Force's squad for their two-match tour of South Africa and debuted as an early blood replacement for Rory Walton in the game against the Cheetahs in Bloemfontein. He made three substitute appearances in total during the 2016 Super Rugby season. Later in 2016, he joined Southland in the Mitre 10 Cup.

In 2017, Philip was a first-choice starter at lock for the Force. After his strong performances for Perth Spirit in the NRC, he was invited into the Barbarians team to play Australia in Sydney, and then selected the Australian squad for the 2017 Wallabies tour. He made his test debut for Australia in the team's win against Japan on 4 November 2017, replacing lock Adam Coleman in the second half.

In 2025 Philip signed a two-year deal with the Waratahs beginning in July 2025 (post-2025 Waratahs season), having returned from Japan Rugby League One (JRLO) club Yokohama Canon Eagles at the end of their 2024–25 season. Philip made his debut for the club against the British & Irish Lions during the 2025 British & Irish Lions tour of Australia in July 2025. Philip came on as a substitute for Miles Amatosero in the 51st minute. The Waratahs lost 10–21. On the same tour Philip made an appearance for the ANZAC XV against the Lions, coming on as a substitute for Angus Blyth in the 55th minute. The ANZAC XV lost 0–48.

In January 2026 Philip was named Waratahs captain ahead of their 2026 Super Rugby Pacific season, taking over from scrum-half Jake Gordon. Philip commented after the announcement, saying "It's a huge honour and privilege to be named captain of the Waratahs and it's something I don't take lightly. We're extremely connected as a squad. It's our second year under Dan (McKellar) and the boys know what to expect. We're one year on of how we want to play, so both on and off the field I think we're going to see those connections come to fruition." Philip also spoke to The Sydney Morning Herald, stating: "I've gone kind of full circle. I had to go to a lot of places over a decade to come back and be able to play here. [Becoming captain] is probably the biggest moment in my career. I grew up supporting the Tahs, I am a New South Welshman." He added of his previous captain: "Me and Jake Gordon are really good friends, we played together through our juniors and been mates for a long time, and he's obviously done a great job over the last five years. Obviously, there's a lot of pressure and expectation that comes along with being a captain."

== Super Rugby statistics ==
As of 28 January 2026.

Season	Team	Games	Starts	Sub	Mins	Tries	Cons	Pens	Drops	Points	Yel	Red
2016	Force	3	0	3	84	0	0	0	0	0	0	0
2017	Force	10	8	2	634	1	0	0	0	5	0	0
2018	Rebels	16	12	4	973	2	0	0	0	10	0	0
2019	Rebels	15	14	1	1037	3	0	0	0	15	1	0
2020	Rebels	6	6	0	458	0	0	0	0	0	0	0
2020 AU	Rebels	9	8	1	679	1	0	0	0	5	1	0
2022	Rebels	14	14	0	1120	3	0	0	0	15	0	0
2023	Rebels	3	3	0	186	0	0	0	0	0	0	0
2025	Waratahs	Did not play; joined post-season										
2026	Waratahs	TBD										
Total		76	65	11	5,171	10	0	0	0	50	2	0
