= John Bryant (rugby union) =

Australian rugby union player (born 2003)

- Born: 20 February 2003 (age 23) Brisbane, Queensland, Australia
- Height: 190 cm (6 ft 3 in)
- Weight: 100 kg (220 lb; 15 st 10 lb)
- School: St Laurence's College

Rugby union career
- Position: Flanker
- Current team: Queensland Reds
Youth career
- Souths
- –2021: St Laurence's College
- 2018–2023: Reds Academy
Amateur team(s)
Years	Team	Apps	(Points)
2022–	Souths		
Senior career
Years	Team	Apps	(Points)
2024–	Queensland Reds	28	(0)
2025–	→ Benetton (loan)	3	(0)
- Correct as of 6 June 2026
International career
Years	Team	Apps	(Points)
2023	Australia U20	4	(0)
- Correct as of 3 March 2024

John Bryant (born 20 February 2003) is an Australian rugby union player, who plays for the Australian Super Rugby franchise, the Queensland Reds. His preferred position is flanker, however he has been deployed across the back row.

== Career ==
=== Early career ===
Bryant was born in Brisbane, Queensland, Australia. He attended St Laurence's College where he first played rugby. He plays his club rugby for Souths and represented the Junior Wallabies in 2023.

=== Senior career ===
Bryant was named in the Reds squad ahead of the 2024 Super Rugby season. He made his debut in Round 1 of the season against the Waratahs.

In July 2025, the Queensland Reds announced a partnership deal with Italian club Benetton in the United Rugby Championship (URC). As part of the deal, four Reds players (John Bryant, Louis Werchon, Richie Asiata, Josh Flook) all joined the club on a three-month loan spell ahead of the 2025–26 United Rugby Championship season. He made his debut in Round 3 of the 2025–26 season against the Lions.
