= Louis Rees-Zammit =

Welsh rugby union and American football player (born 2001)

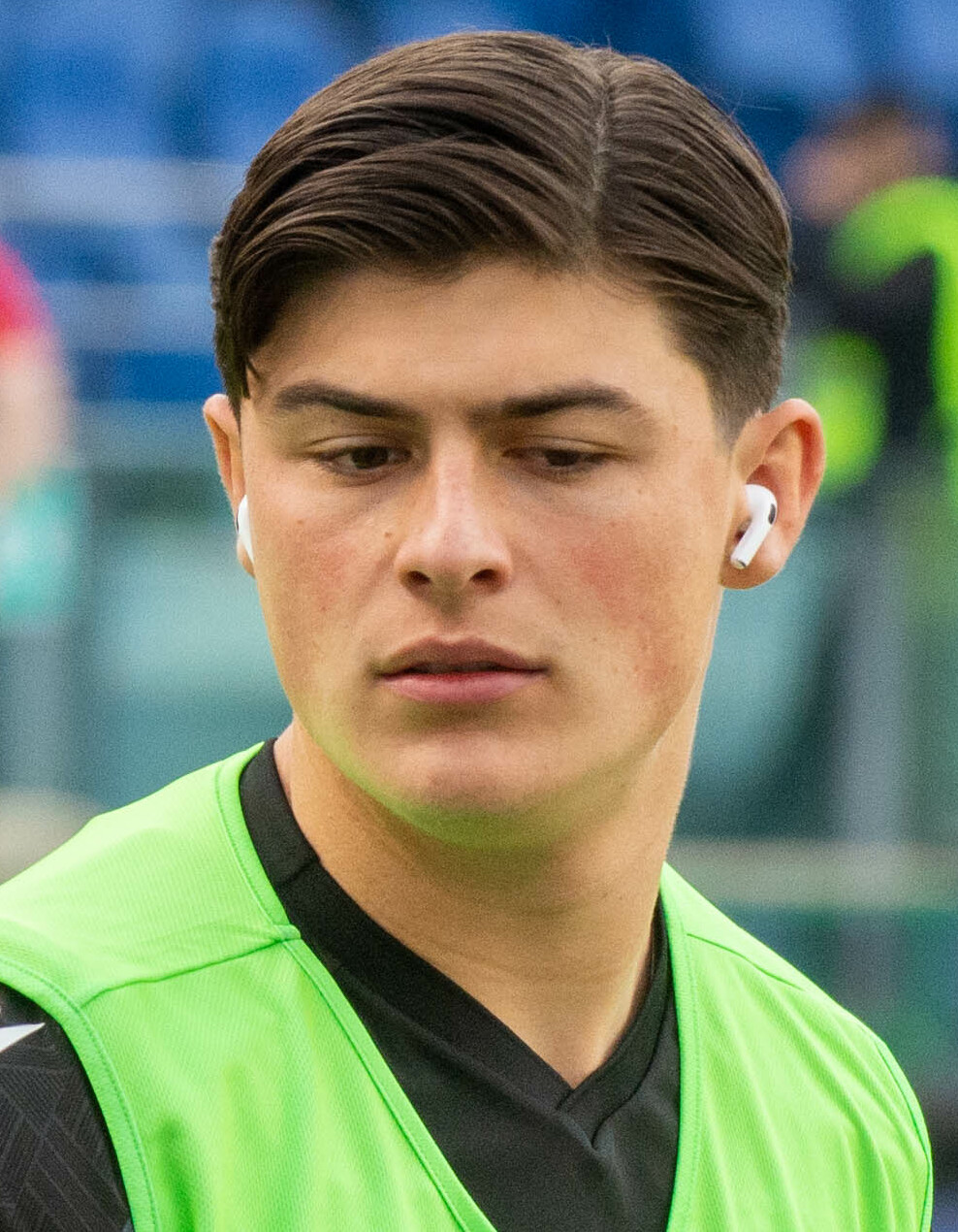
- Rees-Zammit in 2023

Personal information
- Born: 2 February 2001 (age 25) Penarth, Vale of Glamorgan, Wales
- Height: 1.88 m (6 ft 2 in)
- Weight: 100 kg (220 lb; 15 st 10 lb)

Rugby union career
- Position: Wing
- Current team: Bristol
Youth career
- Cardiff Blues
- Hartpury College
Senior career
Years	Team	Apps	(Points)
2018–2024	Gloucester	77	(210)
2025–	Bristol Bears	20	(60)
- Correct as of 5 November 2026
International career
Years	Team	Apps	(Points)
2019	Wales U18	5	(20)
2020–2023, 2025-	Wales	45	(90)
2021	British & Irish Lions	0 (Note: Rees-Zammit made four appearances, scoring three tries against provincial teams in 2021, but he did not play test match.)	(0)
- Correct as of 14 November 2026

Sport
- Football career

No. 89
- Position: Wide receiver

Career information
- High school: The Cathedral School, Llandaff
- College: Hartpury College
- NFL draft: 2024: undrafted

Career history
- Kansas City Chiefs (2024)*; Jacksonville Jaguars (2024)*
- * Offseason or practice squad member only
- Stats at Pro Football Reference

Louis Rees-Zammit (/ˈluːɪs/ LOO-iss; born 2 February 2001) is a Welsh professional rugby union player for Prem Rugby side Bristol Bears and former American football wide receiver. His main position is winger.

In 2024, Rees-Zammit moved from rugby union to American football with the goal of playing in the NFL. In March 2024, he trained and competed in the NFL's International Player Pathway Program (IPPP), after which he was signed to the Kansas City Chiefs as a running back and trained as a return specialist but he was not chosen for the Chiefs' final 53-player team roster for the 2024 season. He subsequently signed for the Jacksonville Jaguars as part of their practice squad as a wide receiver for 2024 and was made a free agent after the end of the season, before he was re-signed in February 2025.

In July 2025, Rees-Zammit announced his return to rugby union following an 18-month stint in NFL, citing his reason as 'wasting his talent'. He joined Bristol Bears on 14 August.

== Early and personal life ==
Louis Rees-Zammit was born in Penarth, Vale of Glamorgan, Wales; his paternal grandfather had emigrated from Malta. Rees-Zammit's parents were athletes and his brother played rugby union for Llandaff RFC, while his uncle Paul Rees played as a full-back for Cardiff RFC, Pontypool RFC and the Wales B team. Louis's father Joe played American football for Cardiff Bay Tigers and inspired Louis to follow the US National Football League (NFL) from a young age.

The family supported Washington Redskins (now Washington Commanders), and Louis's favourite NFL player was DeSean Jackson. Rees-Zammit attended The Cathedral School, Llandaff, for which he played rugby. After secondary school, he dated the social-media influencer and YouTube content creator Saffron Barker, but in March 2024, Barker announced the relationship had ended.

In 2021, due to Rees-Zammit's success on the rugby field, he was chosen as the official patron for the British charity Sporting Minds UK, with which he had worked since 2019. He also did sponsorship work for the telecommunications firm Vodafone during the 2021 Lions tour of South Africa.

=== Youth rugby ===
In his youth, Rees-Zammit played rugby at the Cardiff Blues academy and was named in the Cardiff Schools Team of the Decade for the 2010s. He was also a regular player in the Wales under-18s team, and qualified for the equivalent England team due to residency. In 2017, Rees-Zammit transferred to Hartpury College, the academy of Gloucester Rugby, in the AASE Championship, winning consecutive trophies. After leaving the college, he played for Gloucester United in 2019 before his promotion to the Gloucester professional team. As part of the Gloucester youth team, Rees-Zammit played in two consecutive Premiership Rugby U18 Academy League finals.

== Rugby union career ==
=== Club career ===
==== Gloucester ====
Louis Rees-Zammit debuted in the Gloucester senior team in the 2018–2019 season, becoming the club's youngest ever English Premiership player at 18 years and 70 days. He also became Gloucester's youngest European player, and youngest European try scorer in the pool stage of the Champions Cup in his debut season. In December 2019, he scored two tries against Worcester Warriors during a 36–3 win. Later the same month, at 18, he became the youngest player to score a hat-trick of tries in the Premiership during a 33–26 loss to Northampton, and his performances won him the Premiership Player of the Month Award for that month. On 13 January 2020, Rees-Zammit signed his first professional contract with Gloucester, securing him a long-term deal. He ended his debut season in the 2019–20 Premiership with 15 appearances for the side. Rees-Zammit was awarded Gloucester's young player of the year award for 2019–2020, scoring ten Premiership tries and three in the pool stage of the European Champions Cup.

With continued form at Gloucester, British and Irish Lions coach Warren Gatland chose Rees-Zammit for the Lions' 2021 South African tour. In the game following the call-up, in May that year, he scored two tries against Premiership rivals Northampton Saints. Gloucester ended the season as the second-from-the-bottom team in the table for the 2020–21 Premiership Rugby year.

In the 2021–2022 Premiership, in his first appearance of the season, Rees-Zammit scored two tries in the Round Four win over Sale Sharks. Gloucester reached the quarter-finals of the 2022 European Challenge Cup, with Rees-Zammit scoring a try during the match, which they lost to Saracens. Gloucester also reached to the semi-finals of the 2021–22 Premiership Rugby Cup, losing to Worcester Warriors.

During the 2022–23 Premiership Rugby season, his final full season with Gloucester, Rees-Zammit sustained an ankle injury and could not play for eight weeks until mid February 2023. On his return to fitness, he scored a try in a 28–26 home win over Harlequins. In this season, Rees-Zammit played 13 league games, started in 12 of those, and scored four tries, as well as one try in a single appearance in the European Rugby Champions Cup.

In January 2024, Rees-Zammit decided to leave Gloucester, by which time he had made 77 club appearances and scored 210 points. He was in the last season of his £225,000 ($285,000)-a-year contract, which Gloucester was due to renew. Rees-Zammit had attracted interest from the French Top 14 rugby union league; Bordeaux and Montpellier offered him lucrative contracts to play in France, like some other British and Irish international rugby union players.

==== Bristol Bears ====
On 31 July 2025, Rees-Zammit announced his intent to return to play rugby after suffering a back injury during pre-season training for his NFL team, the Jacksonville Jaguars. In August 2025, having returned from his stint playing NFL, Rees-Zammit signed for Prem Rugby side Bristol Bears ahead of the 2025–26 season. His debut was confirmed by the Bristol Bears' director of rugby, Pat Lam, to play Sale. On his league debut for Bristol, he scored a try in a 42–24 victory over Leicester Tigers.

=== International career ===
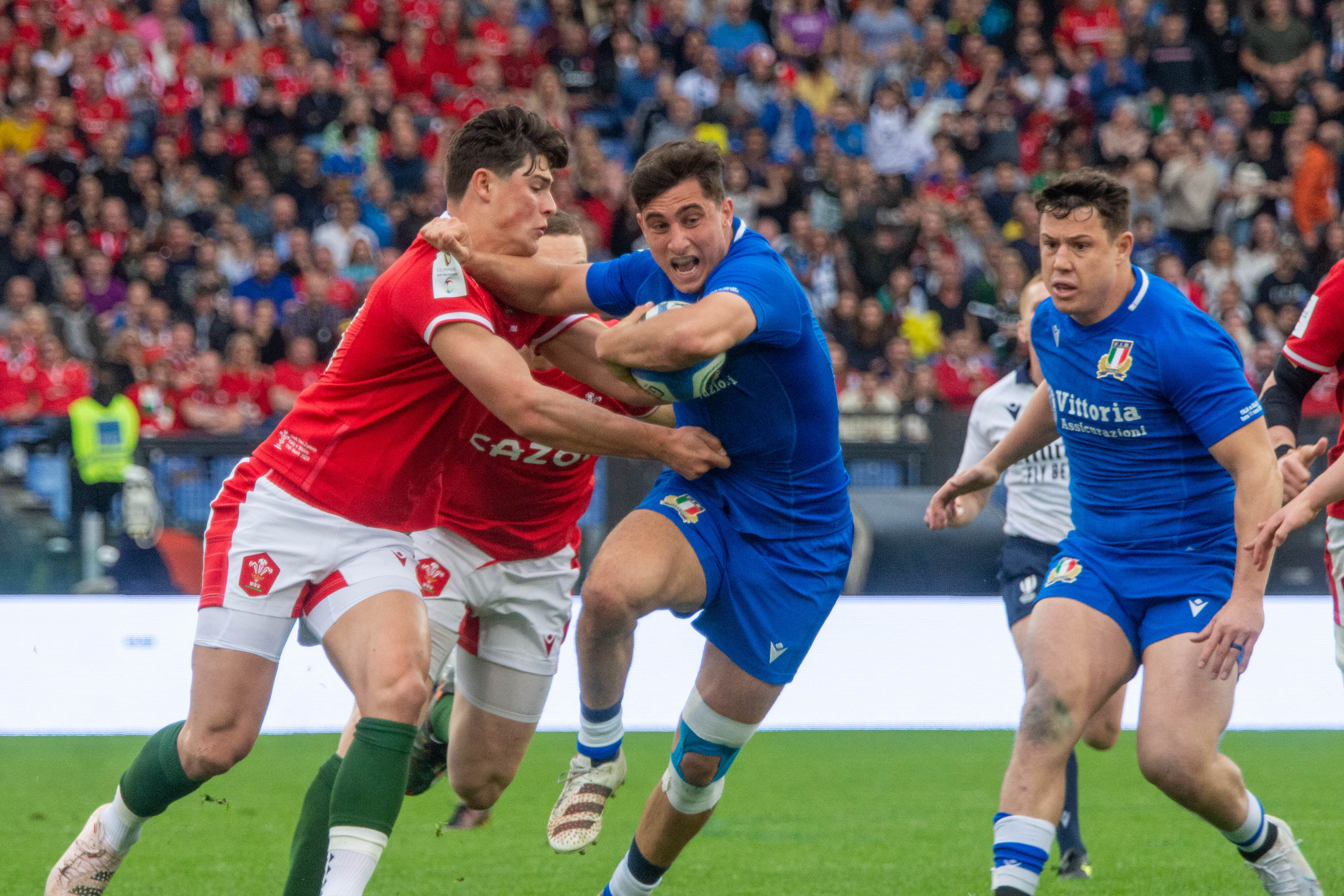
Rees-Zammit (red) tackling an Italian player during the 2023 Six Nations Championship

As a Welsh national, Rees-Zammit initially represented Wales under-18s youth-system team. He received his first full call-up to the senior Wales squad under coach Wayne Pivac on 15 January 2020 as a potential replacement for the 2020 Six Nations Championship. He made his test debut for Wales from the bench against France at the Stade de France in Paris in October 2020. In continued form, Rees-Zammit scored his first test try against Georgia on 21 November 2020.

During the 2021 full season, on 7 February 2021, Rees-Zammit scored his first 2021 Six Nations try on his full European international debut in a Round 1 match against Ireland. On 13 February 2021, in the Six Nations match against Scotland, he scored two tries, including the winning try, and was named the man of the match. (Note: On 21 March, in the Round Five Grand Slam decider against France, Rees-Zammit had a try disallowed, following analysis by the television match official Wayne Barnes, when the ball was judged to have been grounded on the base of the corner flag.) Wales won the 2021 championship the next weekend, giving Rees-Zammit his first Six Nations Championship title. During the tournament, he also won the Try of the Championship award. At the end of the 2021 rugby season, Rees-Zammit was nominated for the World Rugby Men's 15s Breakthrough Player of the Year award, which instead went to the New Zealand youngster Will Jordan.

After four successful seasons for his club and country, Rees-Zammit had more-injury-prone years in 2022 and 2023. He played in three of the five of Wales' matches for the 2022 Six Nations Championship, having been dropped for the match against England. His success with Gloucester qualified him for Wales' 2022 mid-year tour of South Africa, which Wales lost. Rees-Zammit missed two of the five games Wales played in the 2023 Six Nations Championship. He was selected for Wales' squad for the 2023 Rugby World Cup competition in France, scoring five tries in five appearances, although he started only two of those matches. In total, Rees-Zammit scored 14 tries at international level for Wales.

As part of the Wales first team, Rees-Zammit appeared in the first season of the Netflix documentary Six Nations: Full Contact for the 2023 Six Nations Championship. His prompt return to the Welsh national squad has not been ruled out for the next test series.

Rees-Zammit was named in the squad for the 2026 Six Nations by Steve Tandy.

==== Wales international tries ====
Try	Opponent	Location	Venue	Competition	Date	Result
1	Georgia	Llanelli, Wales	Parc y Scarlets	Autumn Nations Cup	21 November 2020	Win
2	Ireland	Cardiff, Wales	Millennium Stadium	2021 Six Nations	7 February 2021	Win
3	Scotland	Edinburgh, Scotland	Murrayfield Stadium	2021 Six Nations	13 February 2021	Win
4	Scotland	Edinburgh, Scotland	Murrayfield Stadium	2021 Six Nations	13 February 2021	Win
5	Italy	Rome, Italy	Stadio Olimpico	2021 Six Nations	13 March 2021	Win
6	Fiji	Cardiff, Wales	Millennium Stadium	2021 Autumn Internationals	14 November 2021	Win
7	South Africa	Pretoria, South Africa	Loftus Versfeld Stadium	2022 Tour of South Africa	2 July 2022	Loss
8	South Africa	Pretoria, South Africa	Loftus Versfeld Stadium	2022 Tour of South Africa	2 July 2022	Loss
9	England	Cardiff, Wales	Millennium Stadium	2023 Six Nations	25 February 2023	Loss
10	Fiji	Bordeaux, France	Stade de Bordeaux	2023 Rugby World Cup	10 September 2023	Win
11	Portugal	Nice, France	Stade de Nice	2023 Rugby World Cup	16 September 2023	Win
12	Georgia	Nantes, France	Stade de la Beaujoire	2023 Rugby World Cup	7 October 2023	Win
13	Georgia	Nantes, France	Stade de la Beaujoire	2023 Rugby World Cup	7 October 2023	Win
14	Georgia	Nantes, France	Stade de la Beaujoire	2023 Rugby World Cup	7 October 2023	Win
15	Japan	Cardiff, Wales	Millennium Stadium	International Friendlies	15 November 2025	Win
16	New Zealand	Cardiff, Wales	Millennium Stadium	International Friendlies	22 November 2025	Loss
17	Japan	Cardiff, Wales	Millennium Stadium	2026 Nations Championship	7 November 2026	Win
18	New Zealand	Cardiff, Wales	Millennium Stadium	2026 Nations Championship	14 November 2026	Win

=== British & Irish Lions 2021 ===
On 6 May 2021, Rees-Zammit was named in the squad for the British & Irish Lions tour of South Africa. His inclusion at the age of 20 years and 93 days made him the youngest player to be selected since the 1959 Lions tour to Australia and New Zealand. He then made his Lions debut appearance in the tour's opening provincial game against the club Lions, scoring the opening try after three minutes. He was selected to play against Sharks in the following game, again scoring a try as the Lions won the match, finishing 54–7. For the Lions' team game against the South Africa A team, he was chosen as a starter in a winning match for the host's second team. On 17 July, for the final provincial game of the tour, Rees-Zammit scored as a substitute during the game against the Stormers. His final tally for the tour was three tries in four appearances. The Lions lost the test series against the Springboks.

== American football career ==
=== Pre-draft ===
On 16 January 2024, Rees-Zammit announced he would retire from rugby union to train in American football through the National Football League's (NFL) International Player Pathway Program (IPPP). His training camp took place in the IMG Academy in Bradenton, Florida, and the pro day took place on 20 March. Rees-Zammit has compared his playing style to that of the NFL players Deebo Samuel and Christian McCaffrey of the San Francisco 49ers.

Pre-draft measurables
Height	Weight	40-yard dash	Vertical jump	Broad jump
6 ft 2 in (1.88 m)	209 lb (95 kg)	4.43 s	29.0 in (0.74 m)	9 ft 7 in (2.92 m)
All values from NFL IPPP Pro Day

Prior to Rees-Zammit's professional NFL debut, he was already considered one of the league's fastest athletes alongside John Ross and Chris Johnson. Rees-Zammit's top speed was 24.2 miles per hour (38.9 km/h) during a rugby game, which is fast enough to rank him as an all-time fastest non-league player (NLP) player.

At the IPPP Pro day event, it was noted since 2013, 14 players have run a sub-4.30-second 40-yard (37 m) dash. Rees-Zammit's secured times of 4.50 and 4.43 seconds in the 40-yard (37 m) dash. The NFL writer Robert Maadi of AP News, who was covering the trials, wrote about Rees-Zammit's disappointment with his dash times, saying he was capable of going more quickly into the 4.2 seconds, which is the NFL record pace.

=== Kansas City Chiefs ===
On 29 March 2024, Rees-Zammit signed a contract with the Kansas City Chiefs to play as a running back. He made his NFL preseason debut for the Chiefs on 11 August 2024 in a 26–13 pre-season loss to the Jacksonville Jaguars, running six times, gaining 22 yards (20 m) and catching one pass for three yards (2.7 m). He made three pre-season appearances for the Chiefs in mid 2024.

During the pre-season on 26 August, the Chiefs re-signed JuJu Smith-Schuster after his time with the New England Patriots. Smith-Schuster took Rees-Zammit's assigned jersey number, #9, and Rees-Zammit switched to jersey number #49, the same number as the punter Matt Araiza, until the final selection was made.

=== Jacksonville Jaguars ===
On 28 August 2024, Rees-Zammit became a free agent after failing to be chosen for the Chiefs' initial 53-man roster during the final pre-season roster cuts. Later that day, he joined the Jacksonville Jaguars' practice squad, taking jersey number #84. Rees-Zammit also changed positions from running back for the Chiefs to wide receiver for the Jaguars, a position he prefers due to his size and strength. As part of the squad, he returned to the UK for the NFL London Games in October 2024. During the journey, he had an interview with the NFL commissioner Roger Goodell and also met William, Prince of Wales.

At the end of the 2024 season for the Jaguars, Rees-Zammit's contract was not renewed, and he was made a free agent. After this setback, he was left looking for a new team to join in the NFL. However, a few days after his termination, a new contract offer was made by the Jags for the 2025 NFL season.

On 17 February 2025, Jacksonville signed him to the active roster. Then at the end of April during the pre-season, Rees-Zammit was moved from the active roster to the exempt/international player list, meaning he cannot be signed by another club while he is on the practice squad. On 31 July, Rees-Zammit announced that he would be returning to rugby union following an 18-month stint in NFL.
