= Ysgol Calon Cymru =

- Llandrindod Wells (52.2436°N 3.3845°W); Builth Wells (52.1512°N 3.4074°W) Wales

Information
- Former names: Builth Wells High School; Llandrindod High School
- Type: Comprehensive
- Motto: The School at the Heart of Wales (Yr Ysgol yng Nghanol Cymru)
- Established: September 2018; 7 years ago
- Local authority: Powys County Council
- Head teacher: Lee Powell
- Gender: Mixed
- Age: 11 to 18
- Language: English or Welsh
- Colors: Red and Navy
- Last Inspection: October 2022
- Website: www.ysgolcalon.cymru

Ysgol Calon Cymru (meaning 'Heart of Wales School') is a bilingual secondary comprehensive school with campuses in Builth Wells and Llandrindod Wells, Powys, mid Wales. It replaced Builth Wells High School and Llandrindod High School and opened at the former schools' sites in September 2018.

== History ==
=== Builth Wells High School and Llandrindod High School ===
Ysgol Calon Cymru was created as a new school on the sites of the former high schools of Builth Wells and Llandrindod Wells in Powys.

=== Ysgol Calon Cymru ===
A decision to replace Builth Wells High School and Llandrindod High School was made by Powys County Council in September 2016 and confirmed in February 2017, despite the council receiving more than 1,700 letters of objection. Llandrindod High School, with 600 pupils, had been put into special measures in 2014 by the school inspection body, Estyn, but by the end of the 2017/18 academic year 74% of pupils attained at least five A*-C grades at GCSE. Builth Wells High School had seen 66% of its pupils attain at least five A*-C grades at GCSE in the 2016/17 year. £3.6 million was used in 2018 from the Welsh Government's 21st Century Schools programme to improve the school facilities at the Llandrindod High School site.

In February 2018 the new name for the school, Ysgol Calon Cymru, was announced, following consultation with staff and pupils at the secondary schools and their feeder primary schools. The new Ysgol Calon Cymru opened on the sites of its two predecessor secondary schools in September 2018, providing English-medium education on both sites and Welsh-medium education at the Builth Wells site.

== Leadership team ==
In late 2017, the governors announced that Ionwen Spowage, former head teacher of Builth Wells High School, had been appointed to the same role at the new school Ysgol Calon Cymru, commencing inceptive work in January 2018. The full leadership team was agreed and announced shortly thereafter. At the beginning of 2019, Spowage announced that she was to become head of Ysgol Bro Dinefwr in Carmarthenshire with effect from Easter. Following this news, Ysgol Calon Cymru governors selected Steve Patten and Lee Powell as the acting head teachers, pending their formal decision of the permanent-contract replacement.

In December 2019, the governors announced that Richard Jones would take up post as head teacher from January 2020. Chair of governors Sharon Hammond said Jones would bring “invaluable knowledge and experience” to the school. Janet Waldron would also join the school as executive leader on a two-year contract.

In February 2024 it was announced that, after four years in the role, Richard Jones would be leaving Ysgol Calon Cymru to take up the position of director of education at Powys County Council. Following this, Lee Powell was once again appointed as acting head teacher of Ysgol Calon Cymru, this time taking sole charge across both the Builth and Llandrindod campuses. In December 2024, Powell was named as the school's new permanent head teacher.

== Facilities ==
Ysgol Calon Cymru consists of two campuses, one located in Builth Wells and one located in Llandrindod Wells. In 2022, the school opened a new Sixth Form Centre and Community Hub in Llandrindod Wells on the site of the town's former Youth Centre and Scout Hall. The building is located within the school grounds close to the main campus and, in addition to being a centre for the school's Sixth Form, has also continued to be used by local community groups such as Scouts, Guides, Brownies and Rainbows and the Llandrindod Youth Club. Upon the centre's opening, Ysgol Calon Cymru head teacher Richard Jones said that Ysgol Calon Cymru "is very proud of its community links and we hope that this facility will strengthen them further."

== Extracurricular ==
=== Sport ===
Ysgol Calon Cymru has a strong sports department, and offers extracurricular activities in athletics, basketball, football, netball, rugby and squash. The school and its predecessors have produced multiple athletes who have represented Wales, including football internationals Alice Evans and Carl Robinson, and rugby union internationals Jacob Beetham and Dan Lydiate. Llandrindod High alumni Kirsty Wade, who represented Wales as a middle-distance runner at the Commonwealth Games, also represented Great Britain at the Olympics.

The school regularly sends teams to the annual Rosslyn Park National Schools Sevens, the world’s largest school rugby tournament. In 2023, the school sent a girls' team to compete in the tournament for the first time. In November 2022, Ysgol Calon Cymru's U18 boys rugby team reached the final of the Welsh Schools Rugby Union Vase, with the final taking place at the Millennium Stadium in Cardiff in March 2023. Despite enjoying an unbeaten season before the final, the team ended as runners-up with the match finishing 46-12 in favour of opponents Ysgol Gyfun Gŵyr from Swansea.

== Notable former pupils ==
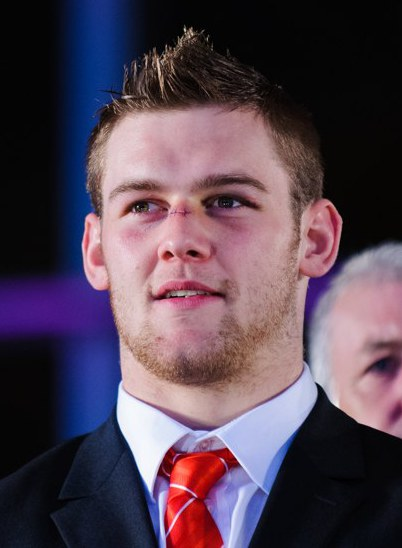
Welsh rugby international Dan Lydiate attended Ysgol Calon Cymru when it was known as Llandrindod High School

The following notable people were educated at Ysgol Calon Cymru (or its predecessors Builth Wells High School and Llandrindod High School):

- John Bufton (born 1962), MEP for Wales
- Jacob Beetham (born 2001), Wales rugby union international
- Tegwen Bruce-Deans (born 2000), Urdd Eisteddfod Crown and Chair-winning writer
- Alice Evans (born 1994), Wales football international and futsal player
- Dan Lydiate (born 1988), Wales rugby union international
- Carl Robinson (born 1976), Wales football international and coach
- Kirsty Wade (born 1962), Olympic middle-distance runner
