= Louis Werchon =

Australian rugby union player (born 2002)

- Born: 25 October 2002 (age 24) Nambour, Queensland, Australia
- Height: 1.77 m (5 ft 10 in)
- Weight: 84 kg (185 lb; 13 st 3 lb)
- School: Sunshine Coast Grammar School

Rugby union career
- Position: Scrum-half
- Current team: Benetton
Youth career
- Maroochydore Swans
Amateur team(s)
Years	Team	Apps	(Points)
2020–2022	Brothers		
2022–	Wests		
Senior career
Years	Team	Apps	(Points)
2022–2026	Reds	19	(38)
2025	→ Benetton (loan)	7	(5)
2026–	Benetton	0	(0)
- Correct as of 6 June 2026
International career
Years	Team	Apps	(Points)
2022	Australia U20	2	(0)
- Correct as of 5 July 2022

Louis Werchon (born 25 October 2002) is an Australian rugby union player currently playing for the Super Rugby club the Queensland Reds as a scrum-half.

== Early life and background ==
Louis Werchon was born in the Sunshine Coast suburb of Nambour in Australia's north-eastern state of Queensland. Sunshine Coast Grammar product, Werchon was a Junior Wallaby and played his early rugby for the Maroochydore Swans. He featured in a reserves premiership with Brothers in 2022, kicking the grand final-winning field goal.

== Career ==
=== Reds ===
Werchon joined the Queensland Reds during their 2023 Super Rugby Pacific campaign and missed out on a possible debut off the bench when he was dropped by coach Brad Thorn for arriving late. He was retained by the Reds in 2024 and got another opportunity when scrum-half Tate McDermott received a three-week suspension, subsequently making his debut in their Round 9 win over the Highlanders at Lang Park.

=== Benetton ===
In July 2025, the Queensland Reds announced a partnership deal with Italian club Benetton in the United Rugby Championship (URC). As part of the deal, four Reds players (John Bryant, Louis Werchon, Richie Asiata, Josh Flook) all joined the club on a three-month loan spell ahead of the 2025–26 United Rugby Championship season. He made his debut in Round 1 of the 2025–26 season against the Connacht.

In January 2026, Werchon was confirmed to have signed a two-year deal with Benetton ahead of the 2026–27 United Rugby Championship season. Upon his return signing, club president Antonio Pavanello stated to RugbyPass: "The return of Louis Werchon represents a highly valuable acquisition for us from a technical perspective." In March, Werchon was later joined by Queensland Reds teammate Josh Flook.

== See also ==
- List of Queensland Reds players
