= Jacob Beetham =

Welsh rugby union player

- Born: 18 April 2001 (age 25) Brecon, Wales
- Height: 188 cm (6 ft 2 in)
- Weight: 96 kg (212 lb)
- School: Ysgol Calon Cymru; Cardiff and Vale College

Rugby union career
- Position: Full-back
- Current team: Cardiff
Amateur team(s)
Years	Team	Apps	(Points)
- Glamorgan Wanderers
Senior career
Years	Team	Apps	(Points)
2021–	Cardiff RFC	21	(164)
2021–	Cardiff Rugby	24	(3)
- Correct as of 18:06, 29 June 2024 (UTC)
International career
Years	Team	Apps	(Points)
2020–2021	Wales U20	7	(10)
2024–	Wales	1	(0)
- Correct as of 18:06, 29 June 2024 (UTC)

Jacob Beetham (born 18 April 2001) is a Welsh rugby union player, who plays as a full-back for United Rugby Championship side Cardiff Rugby.

== Early life ==
Beetham was born in Brecon, Powys, and educated at the Builth Wells campus of Ysgol Calon Cymru. He attended Cardiff and Vale College.

== Club career ==
=== Cardiff Rugby ===
Beetham was part of the Cardiff academy until under-18 level. He departed the academy and played for Glamorgan Wanderers, before rejoining the academy during the 2019–20 season.

Beetham was named in the Cardiff academy squad for the 2021–22 season. He made his debut for Cardiff in the first round of the 2021–22 European Rugby Champions Cup against Toulouse, starting at full-back. During the match, he received a red card for a high tackle, and was subsequently banned for three weeks.

In September 2022, while playing for Cardiff RFC, Beetham suffered an ACL injury which ruled him out for the remainder of the season.

Ahead of the 2023–24 season, Beetham signed an extension with Cardiff's academy, while training with the senior squad.

On 2 February 2024, Beetham signed a new contract with Cardiff.

Beetham has shown his versatility while playing for Cardiff, covering inside centre, wing, and full-back all in the opening rounds of the 2025–26 United Rugby Championship. Beetham signed an extension again, on 28 April 2026.

== International career ==
=== Wales U20 ===
Beetham was selected for Wales U20 for the 2020 Six Nations Under 20s Championship. During the match against England, he was taken out in the air by opposing full-back Freddie Steward and injured. Steward was banned for four weeks following his citing.

Beetham remained in the squad for the 2021 Six Nations Under 20s Championship.

=== Wales ===
Ahead of the 2024 Six Nations Championship, Beetham was targeted by Scotland head coach Gregor Townsend. Beetham joined the Wales squad to train during the tournament, but was not officially called up.

Beetham was called up to the senior Wales squad by Warren Gatland in June 2024 for the tour to Australia. Beetham made his international debut on 22 June 2024, coming on as a replacement against South Africa. Beetham was slated to feature in the friendly against Queensland Reds, but suffered a foot injury which ruled him out of contention. He returned to the Wales squad for the 2025 end-of-year rugby union internationals, but did not feature in any match day squad..
