= Efan Daniel =

Welsh rugby union player

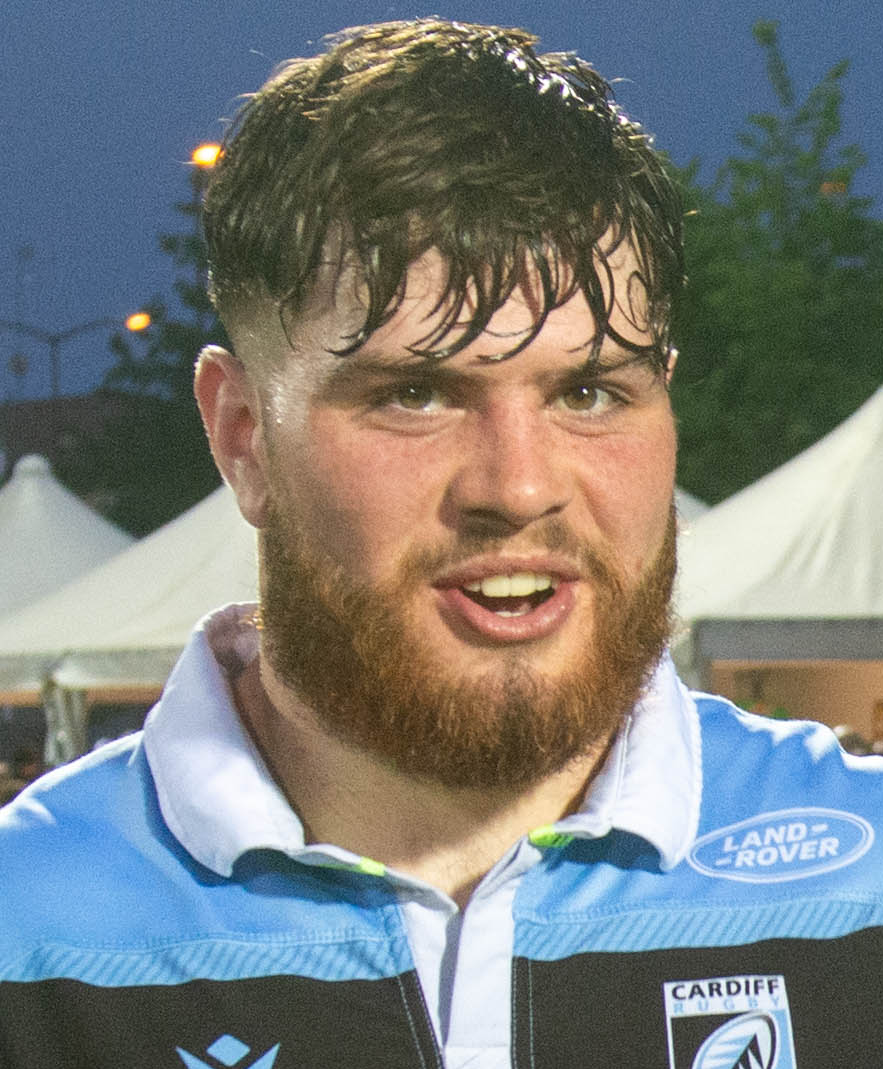
- Born: 14 December 2002 (age 23) Rhondda, Wales
- Height: 1.85 m (6 ft 1 in)
- Weight: 97 kg (15.3 st; 214 lb)
- School: Treorchy Comprehensive School

Rugby union career
- Position: Hooker
Senior career
Years	Team	Apps	(Points)
2022–2025	Cardiff	23	(0)
2025–	Ospreys	8	(5)
International career
Years	Team	Apps	(Points)
2021–2022	Wales U20	11	(0)

Efan Daniel (born 14 December 2002) is a Welsh rugby union player, currently playing for United Rugby Championship side Ospreys. His preferred position is hooker.

== Professional career ==
=== Cardiff Rugby ===
Daniel was named in the Cardiff academy squad for the 2021–22 season. He made his debut for Cardiff in Round 11 of the 2021–22 United Rugby Championship against Leinster, coming on as a replacement.

=== Ospreys ===
Daniel signed with the Ospreys on 15 July 2025. Daniel made his debut on 29 November 2025, against Edinburgh.

== International career ==
=== Wales U20 ===
In 2021, Daniel was selected by Wales U20 for the 2021 Six Nations Under 20s Championship. He remained with the side for the 2022 Six Nations Under 20s Championship. Daniel also featured during the 2022 U20 Summer Series.

=== Wales ===
Daniel was selected by Wales for the 2024 Wales rugby union tour of Australia. He came off the bench in the 36-35 win over Queensland Reds.
