= 2022 Wales rugby union tour of South Africa =

- Coach: Wayne Pivac
- Tour captain: Dan Biggar
- Top test point scorer: Dan Biggar (26)
- Top test try scorer: Louis Rees-Zammit (2)
Summary
P	W	D	L
Total
3	1	0	2
Test match
3	1	0	2
Opponent
P	W	D	L
South Africa
3	1	0	2

Tour chronology
- ← Argentina 2018 Australia 2024 →

The Wales national rugby union team toured South Africa in July 2022 for a series of three test matches against the South Africa national team. It was the seventh time Wales had toured South Africa in test history. In each of the previous 10 matches contested between the two nations on South African soil – the first of which took place in 1964 – South Africa were the victors.

South Africa took the lead in the 2022 test series, beating Wales by 32–29 in Pretoria on 2 July. A week later, Wales made history with their first ever test victory in South Africa, leveling the series by winning 13–12 in Bloemfontein on 9 July. The decider took place in Cape Town on 16 July, with South Africa winning 30–14 to take the series.

== Squads ==
=== South Africa ===
South Africa named their squad for the three-test series on 11 June 2022. Coach Jacques Nienaber picked 43 players, including eight who were yet to win a cap for the Springboks: Evan Roos, Elrigh Louw, Ruan Nortjé, Salmaan Moerat, Ntuthuko Mchunu, Deon Fourie, Kurt-Lee Arendse and Grant Williams.

Caps and ages are as of 2 July 2022, prior to the first test.

Player	Position	Date of birth (age)	Caps	Club/province
Joseph Dweba	Hooker	25 October 1995 (aged 26)	1	(France) Bordeaux
Malcolm Marx	Hooker	13 July 1994 (aged 27)	46	(Japan) Kubota Spears
Bongi Mbonambi	Hooker	7 January 1991 (aged 31)	48	(South Africa) Sharks
Thomas du Toit	Prop	5 May 1995 (aged 27)	13	(South Africa) Sharks
Steven Kitshoff	Prop	10 February 1992 (aged 30)	59	(South Africa) Stormers
Vincent Koch	Prop	13 March 1990 (aged 32)	31	(England) Saracens
Frans Malherbe	Prop	14 March 1991 (aged 31)	46	(South Africa) Stormers
Ntuthuko Mchunu	Prop	5 April 1999 (aged 23)	0	(South Africa) Sharks
Ox Nché	Prop	23 July 1995 (aged 26)	9	(South Africa) Sharks
Trevor Nyakane	Prop	4 May 1989 (aged 33)	54	(France) Racing 92
Lood de Jager	Lock	17 December 1992 (aged 29)	56	(England) Sale Sharks
Eben Etzebeth	Lock	29 October 1991 (aged 30)	97	(South Africa) Sharks
Salmaan Moerat	Lock	6 March 1998 (aged 24)	0	(South Africa) Stormers
Ruan Nortjé	Lock	25 July 1998 (aged 23)	0	(South Africa) Bulls
Franco Mostert	Lock	27 November 1990 (aged 31)	51	(Japan) Mie Honda Heat
Marvin Orie	Lock	15 February 1993 (aged 29)	7	(South Africa) Stormers
Pieter-Steph du Toit	Loose forward	20 August 1992 (aged 29)	58	(Japan) Toyota Verblitz
Marcell Coetzee	Loose forward	8 May 1991 (aged 31)	30	(South Africa) Bulls
Rynhardt Elstadt	Loose forward	20 October 1989 (aged 32)	3	(France) Toulouse
Deon Fourie	Loose forward	25 September 1986 (aged 35)	0	(South Africa) Stormers
Siya Kolisi (c)	Loose forward	16 June 1991 (aged 31)	63	(South Africa) Sharks
Elrigh Louw	Loose forward	20 October 1999 (aged 22)	0	(South Africa) Bulls
Evan Roos	Loose forward	21 January 2000 (aged 22)	0	(South Africa) Stormers
Kwagga Smith	Loose forward	11 June 1993 (aged 29)	19	(Japan) Shizuoka Blue Revs
Jasper Wiese	Loose forward	21 October 1995 (aged 26)	11	(England) Leicester Tigers
Faf de Klerk	Scrum-half	19 October 1991 (aged 30)	36	(England) Sale Sharks
Jaden Hendrikse	Scrum-half	23 March 2000 (aged 22)	2	(South Africa) Sharks
Herschel Jantjies	Scrum-half	22 April 1996 (aged 26)	21	(South Africa) Stormers
Cobus Reinach	Scrum-half	7 February 1990 (aged 32)	21	(France) Montpellier
Grant Williams	Scrum-half	22 July 1996 (aged 25)	0	(South Africa) Sharks
Elton Jantjies	Fly-half	1 August 1990 (aged 31)	44	(Japan) NTT Red Hurricanes
Handré Pollard	Fly-half	11 March 1994 (aged 28)	60	(France) Montpellier
Lukhanyo Am	Centre	28 November 1993 (aged 28)	26	(South Africa) Sharks
Damian de Allende	Centre	25 November 1991 (aged 30)	58	(Ireland) Munster
André Esterhuizen	Centre	30 March 1994 (aged 28)	8	(England) Harlequins
Jesse Kriel	Centre	15 February 1994 (aged 28)	51	(Japan) Yokohama Canon Eagles
Cheslin Kolbe	Wing	28 October 1993 (aged 28)	18	(France) Toulon
Makazole Mapimpi	Wing	26 July 1990 (aged 31)	25	(South Africa) Sharks
Kurt-Lee Arendse	Wing	17 June 1996 (aged 26)	0	(South Africa) Bulls
Aphelele Fassi	Fullback	23 January 1998 (aged 24)	2	(South Africa) Sharks
Warrick Gelant	Fullback	20 May 1995 (aged 27)	9	(South Africa) Stormers
Willie le Roux	Fullback	18 August 1989 (aged 32)	71	(Japan) Toyota Verblitz
Damian Willemse	Fullback	7 May 1998 (aged 24)	15	(South Africa) Stormers

=== Wales ===
Wales coach Wayne Pivac named a squad of 33 for the tour, including two uncapped players in forwards Tommy Reffell and James Ratti, while flanker Dan Lydiate, fly-half Rhys Patchell and centre George North made their returns after long absences due to injury. Surprise omissions from the squad included forwards Seb Davies, James Botham and Jac Morgan. On 7 June, Dragons prop Leon Brown pulled out through injury and was replaced by Sam Wainwright. Scarlets prop Harri O'Connor was added to the squad on 21 June. Fly-half Gareth Anscombe joined up with the squad on 28 June, having stayed back in Wales pending the birth of his second child.

Player	Position	Date of birth (age)	Caps	Club/province
Ryan Elias	Hooker	7 January 1995 (age 31)	27	(Wales) Scarlets
Dewi Lake	Hooker	16 May 1999 (age 26)	5	(Wales) Ospreys
Sam Parry	Hooker	17 December 1991 (age 34)	5	(Wales) Ospreys
Rhys Carré	Prop	8 February 1998 (age 28)	16	(Wales) Cardiff
Tomas Francis	Prop	27 April 1992 (age 33)	64	(Wales) Ospreys
Wyn Jones	Prop	26 February 1992 (age 34)	43	(Wales) Scarlets
Dillon Lewis	Prop	4 January 1996 (age 30)	38	(Wales) Cardiff
Harri O'Connor	Prop	25 October 2000 (age 25)	0	(Wales) Scarlets
Gareth Thomas	Prop	2 August 1993 (age 32)	10	(Wales) Ospreys
Sam Wainwright	Prop	7 May 1998 (age 27)	0	(England) Saracens
Adam Beard	Lock	7 January 1996 (age 30)	34	(Wales) Ospreys
Ben Carter	Lock	23 January 2001 (age 25)	6	(Wales) Dragons
Alun Wyn Jones	Lock	19 September 1985 (age 40)	150	(Wales) Ospreys
Will Rowlands	Lock	19 September 1991 (age 34)	18	(Wales) Dragons
Taine Basham	Back row	2 November 1999 (age 26)	10	(Wales) Dragons
Taulupe Faletau	Back row	12 November 1990 (age 35)	89	(England) Bath
Dan Lydiate	Back row	18 December 1987 (age 38)	65	(Wales) Ospreys
Josh Navidi	Back row	30 December 1990 (age 35)	30	(Wales) Cardiff
James Ratti	Back row	14 October 1997 (age 28)	0	(Wales) Cardiff
Tommy Reffell	Back row	27 April 1999 (age 26)	0	(England) Leicester Tigers
Gareth Davies	Scrum-half	18 August 1990 (age 35)	67	(Wales) Scarlets
Kieran Hardy	Scrum-half	30 November 1995 (age 30)	11	(Wales) Scarlets
Tomos Williams	Scrum-half	1 January 1995 (age 31)	33	(Wales) Cardiff
Gareth Anscombe	Fly-half	10 May 1991 (age 34)	31	(Wales) Ospreys
Dan Biggar	Fly-half	16 October 1989 (age 36)	100	(England) Northampton Saints
Rhys Patchell	Fly-half	17 May 1993 (age 32)	21	(Wales) Scarlets
George North	Centre	13 April 1992 (age 34)	102	(Wales) Ospreys
Nick Tompkins	Centre	16 February 1995 (age 31)	20	(England) Saracens
Owen Watkin	Centre	12 October 1996 (age 29)	31	(Wales) Ospreys
Johnny Williams	Centre	18 October 1996 (age 29)	5	(Wales) Scarlets
Josh Adams	Wing	21 April 1995 (age 31)	39	(Wales) Cardiff
Alex Cuthbert	Wing	5 April 1990 (age 36)	51	(Wales) Ospreys
Louis Rees-Zammit	Wing	2 February 2001 (age 25)	16	(England) Gloucester
Liam Williams	Fullback	9 April 1991 (age 35)	78	(Wales) Scarlets

== Fixtures ==
The tour was confirmed in February 2022, with the two sides scheduled to play three tests in July 2022. The first test would be played at Loftus Versfeld Stadium in Pretoria on 2 July, the second test at Free State Stadium in Bloemfontein on 9 July, and the third test at Newlands Stadium in Cape Town on 16 July.

=== 1st test ===
2 July 2022
17:05 SAST (UTC+02)

South Africa	32–29	Wales
Try: Mbonambi 46' c Marx 51' m Kolbe 66' c Penalty try 75'; Con: Willemse (2/3) 48', 68'; Pen: E. Jantjies (1/3) 17'; Willemse (1/1) 80+3'	Report	Try: Rees-Zammit (2) 3' m, 32' c Lake 77' m Con: Biggar (1/3) 34'; Pen: Biggar (3/3) 20', 55', 63'; Drop: Biggar (1/1) 9'

Loftus Versfeld Stadium, Pretoria
Attendance: 51,762
Referee: Nika Amashukeli (Georgia)

Team details

FB	15	Damian Willemse
RW	14	Cheslin Kolbe
OC	13	Lukhanyo Am
IC	12	Damian de Allende
LW	11	Makazole Mapimpi
FH	10	Elton Jantjies	(substituted off) 41'
SH	9	Faf de Klerk	(substituted off) 71'
N8	8	Jasper Wiese
BF	7	Franco Mostert	(substituted off) 51'
OF	6	Siya Kolisi (c)	(substituted off) 51'
RL	5	Lood de Jager
LL	4	Eben Etzebeth	(substituted off) 70'
TP	3	Frans Malherbe	(substituted off) 50'
HK	2	Bongi Mbonambi	(substituted off) 50'
LP	1	Ox Nché	(substituted off) 50'
Replacements:
HK	16	Malcolm Marx	(substituted on) 50'
PR	17	Steven Kitshoff	(substituted on) 50'
PR	18	Vincent Koch	(substituted on) 50'
LK	19	Salmaan Moerat	(substituted on) 70'
FL	20	Elrigh Louw	(substituted on) 51'
FL	21	Kwagga Smith	(substituted on) 51'
SH	22	Herschel Jantjies	(substituted on) 71'
FB	23	Willie le Roux	(substituted on) 41'
Coach:
(South Africa) Jacques Nienaber

FB	15	Liam Williams
RW	14	Louis Rees-Zammit	(yellow card) 74'
OC	13	George North
IC	12	Nick Tompkins
LW	11	Josh Adams		(substituted off) 63'
FH	10	Dan Biggar (c)	(yellow card) 38'
SH	9	Kieran Hardy		(substituted off) 53'
N8	8	Taulupe Faletau
OF	7	Tommy Reffell
BF	6	Dan Lydiate		(substituted off) 63'
RL	5	Adam Beard		(substituted off) 50'
LL	4	Will Rowlands
TP	3	Dillon Lewis		(substituted off) 45'	(substituted on) 50'
HK	2	Ryan Elias		(substituted off) 50'
LP	1	Gareth Thomas		(substituted off) 53'
Replacements:
HK	16	Dewi Lake		(substituted on) 50'
PR	17	Rhys Carre	(yellow card) 75'	(substituted on) 53'
PR	18	Tomas Francis		(substituted on) 45'	(substituted off) 50'
LK	19	Alun Wyn Jones	(yellow card) 66'	(substituted on) 50'
FL	20	Josh Navidi		(substituted on) 63'
SH	21	Tomos Williams		(substituted on) 53'
FH	22	Gareth Anscombe
CE	23	Owen Watkin		(substituted on) 63'
Coach:
(New Zealand) Wayne Pivac

Assistant referees:
Angus Gardner (Australia)
Andrea Piardi (Italy)
Television match official:
Joy Neville (Ireland)

Notes:

- Elrigh Louw, Salmaan Moerat (both South Africa) and Tommy Reffell (Wales) made their international debuts.

=== 2nd test ===
9 July 2022
17:05 SAST (UTC+02)

South Africa	12–13	Wales
Pen: Pollard (4/6) 5', 43', 51', 59'	Report	Try: Adams 77' c Con: Anscombe (1/1) 78'; Pen: Biggar (1/2) 2'; Anscombe (1/2) 66'

Free State Stadium, Bloemfontein
Referee: Angus Gardner (Australia)

Team details

FB	15	Warrick Gelant
RW	14	Kurt-Lee Arendse
OC	13	Jesse Kriel
IC	12	André Esterhuizen
LW	11	Aphelele Fassi	(substituted off) 67'
FH	10	Handré Pollard (c)	(substituted off) 73'
SH	9	Jaden Hendrikse
N8	8	Evan Roos	(substituted off) 47'
BF	7	Pieter-Steph du Toit
OF	6	Marcell Coetzee	(substituted off) 47'
RL	5	Marvin Orie	(substituted off) 59'
LL	4	Eben Etzebeth
TP	3	Trevor Nyakane	(substituted off) 41'
HK	2	Joseph Dweba	(substituted off) 41'
LP	1	Thomas du Toit	(substituted off) 47'
Replacements:
HK	16	Malcolm Marx	(substituted on) 41'
PR	17	Ntuthuko Mchunu	(substituted on) 47'
PR	18	Vincent Koch	(substituted on) 41'
LK	19	Ruan Nortjé	(substituted on) 59'
FL	20	Rynhardt Elstadt	(substituted on) 47'
FL	21	Deon Fourie	(substituted on) 47'
SH	22	Grant Williams	(substituted on) 73'
FB	23	Damian Willemse	(substituted on) 67'
Coach:
(South Africa) Jacques Nienaber

FB	15	Liam Williams
RW	14	Louis Rees-Zammit
OC	13	George North
IC	12	Nick Tompkins
LW	11	Alex Cuthbert		(substituted off) 17'
FH	10	Dan Biggar (c)		(substituted off) 50'
SH	9	Kieran Hardy		(substituted off) 41'
N8	8	Taulupe Faletau
OF	7	Tommy Reffell
BF	6	Dan Lydiate		(substituted off) 59'
RL	5	Adam Beard
LL	4	Will Rowlands		(substituted off) 54'
TP	3	Dillon Lewis		(substituted off) 65'
HK	2	Ryan Elias		(substituted off) 49'
LP	1	Gareth Thomas		(substituted off) 49'
Replacements:
HK	16	Dewi Lake		(substituted on) 49'
PR	17	Wyn Jones		(substituted on) 49'
PR	18	Sam Wainwright		(substituted on) 65'
LK	19	Alun Wyn Jones	(yellow card) 56'	(substituted on) 54'
FL	20	Josh Navidi		(substituted on) 59'
SH	21	Tomos Williams		(substituted on) 41'
FH	22	Gareth Anscombe		(substituted on) 50'
WG	23	Josh Adams		(substituted on) 17'
Coach:
(New Zealand) Wayne Pivac

Assistant referees:
Matthew Carley (England)
Andrea Piardi (Italy)
Television match official:
Brett Cronan (Australia)

Notes:

- This was Wales' first ever victory over South Africa in a test match on South African soil.
- Kurt-Lee Arendse, Deon Fourie, Ntuthuko Mchunu, Ruan Nortjé, Evan Roos, Grant Williams (all South Africa) and Sam Wainwright (Wales) made their international debuts.

=== 3rd test ===
16 July 2022
17:05 SAST (UTC+02)

South Africa	30–14	Wales
Try: Pollard 14' c Mbonambi 38' c Kolisi 53' c Con: Pollard (3/3) 16', 39', 54'; Pen: Pollard (3/3) 5', 78', 80+1'	Report	Try: Reffell 19' m Pen: Biggar (3/3) 33', 42', 48'

Cape Town Stadium, Cape Town
Referee: Matthew Carley (England)

Team details

FB	15	Damian Willemse
RW	14	Cheslin Kolbe	(substituted off) 21'
OC	13	Lukhanyo Am
IC	12	Damian de Allende
LW	11	Makazole Mapimpi
FH	10	Handré Pollard
SH	9	Jaden Hendrikse	(substituted off) 65'
N8	8	Jasper Wiese	(substituted off) 39'
BF	7	Pieter-Steph du Toit	(substituted off) 77'
OF	6	Siya Kolisi (c)
RL	5	Lood de Jager
LL	4	Eben Etzebeth	(substituted off) 61'
TP	3	Frans Malherbe	(substituted off) 45'
HK	2	Bongi Mbonambi	(substituted off) 45'
LP	1	Trevor Nyakane	(substituted off) 45'
Replacements:
HK	16	Malcolm Marx	(substituted on) 45'
PR	17	Steven Kitshoff	(substituted on) 45'
PR	18	Vincent Koch	(substituted on) 45'
LK	19	Franco Mostert	(substituted on) 61'
FL	20	Kwagga Smith	(substituted on) 39'
FL	21	Elrigh Louw	(substituted on) 77'
SH	22	Faf de Klerk	(substituted on) 65'
FB	23	Willie le Roux	(substituted on) 21'
Coach:
(South Africa) Jacques Nienaber

FB	15	Liam Williams
RW	14	Louis Rees-Zammit
OC	13	George North
IC	12	Nick Tompkins	(substituted off) 60'
LW	11	Josh Adams
FH	10	Dan Biggar (c)
SH	9	Kieran Hardy	(substituted off) 51'
N8	8	Josh Navidi
OF	7	Tommy Reffell	(substituted off) 55'
BF	6	Dan Lydiate	(substituted off) 16'
RL	5	Adam Beard
LL	4	Will Rowlands
TP	3	Dillon Lewis	(substituted off) 41'
HK	2	Ryan Elias	(substituted off) 40'
LP	1	Gareth Thomas	(substituted off) 56'
Replacements:
HK	16	Dewi Lake	(substituted on) 40'
PR	17	Wyn Jones	(substituted on) 56'
PR	18	Sam Wainwright	(substituted on) 41'
LK	19	Alun Wyn Jones	(substituted on) 16'
FL	20	Taine Basham	(substituted on) 55'
SH	21	Tomos Williams	(substituted on) 51'
FH	22	Rhys Patchell
CE	23	Owen Watkin	(substituted on) 60'
Coach:
(New Zealand) Wayne Pivac

Assistant referees:
Angus Gardner (Australia)
Nika Amashukeli (Georgia)
Television match official:
Brett Cronan (Australia)

Notes:

- Taulupe Faletau and Gareth Anscombe were originally named in the Wales team, but pulled out during the warm-up. Faletau was replaced in the starting line-up by Josh Navidi, whose place on the bench was taken by Taine Basham, while Anscombe's place among the replacements was taken by Rhys Patchell.
- Eben Etzebeth (South Africa) earned his 100th test cap.
- Bongi Mbonambi (South Africa) earned his 50th test cap.

== See also ==
- 2022 mid-year rugby union tests
- History of rugby union matches between South Africa and Wales
