= Filipo Daugunu =

Fijian-born Australian professional rugby union player

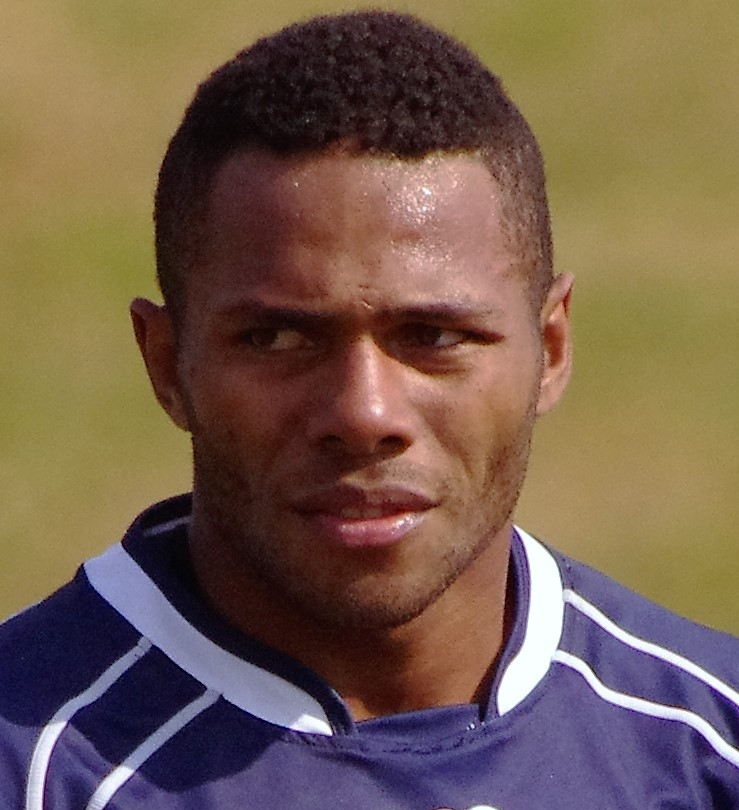
- Daugunu during a match representing Queensland Country, September 2017
- Full name: Filipo Suraki Daugunu
- Born: 4 March 1995 (age 31) Labasa, Fiji
- Height: 181 cm (5 ft 11 in)
- Weight: 101 kg (223 lb; 15 st 13 lb)
- School: Labasa Sangam College

Rugby union career
- Position: Wing/Centre
- Current team: Reds
Senior career
| Years | Team | Apps | (Points) |
| 2017–2019 | Queensland Country | 21 | (106) |
| 2018–2023 | Reds | 69 | (120) |
| 2024 | Rebels | 12 | (25) |
| 2025- | Reds | 25 | (57) |
- Correct as of 6 June 2026
International career
| Years | Team | Apps | (Points) |
| 2015 | Fiji U20 | 4 | (14) |
| 2020– | Australia | 27 | (45) |
| 2025 | First Nations & Pasifika XV | 1 | (0) |
- Correct as of 8 November 2026

Filipo Suraki Daugunu (born 4 March 1995) is a rugby union player who plays for the Reds in the Super Rugby Pacific competition. His position of choice is wing. Fijian-born, Daugunu moved to Australia in 2016 at the age of 20 to pursue a professional sporting career. He was selected to play international rugby for Australia in October 2020.

== Early career ==
Daugunu started his sporting career playing football for his local district football team, Labasa Football. He played both as a goalkeeper and a striker, and became a regular in the Labasa team in 2013.

In 2015, Daugunu gave up an association football career to play rugby union, representing Fiji Under-20 at the World Rugby Junior Trophy in Portugal. He was involved with the Fiji 7s program in 2016, but opted out of joining the team to play on the world circuit. He moved to Brisbane, Australia and began playing club rugby there.

Daugunu gained significant attention in Queensland Premier Rugby after scoring sixty-six points from eleven appearances for Wests Bulldogs in 2017. After helping Wests to their first finals appearance in ten years, losing 24–22 to Sunnybank in the semi-finals, he was recruited to play in the National Rugby Championship (NRC) for Queensland Country.

Daugunu scored seventy-one points in just eight appearances for Queensland Country on the way to club's first national title. He scored a hat-trick of tries in the final against the Canberra Vikings which was instrumental to Country's 42–28 win.

== Super Rugby ==
Because of his performances in the NRC, the Queensland Reds signed him in late 2017 to join their squad for the 2018 Super Rugby season.

In 2024, Filipo joined Melbourne Rebels. He returned to the Reds for the 2025 season on a one-year contract.

=== International tries ===
As of 8 November 2026

| Try | Opposing team | Location | Venue | Competition | Date | Result | Score |
|---|---|---|---|---|---|---|---|
| 1 | New Zealand | Wellington, New Zealand | Sky Stadium | 2020 end-of-year rugby union internationals | 11 October 2020 | Draw | 16–16 |
| 2 | Wales | Cardiff, Wales | Principality Stadium | 2021 Autumn Nations Series | 20 November 2021 | Loss | 29–28 |
| 3 | Wales | Sydney, Australia | Sydney Football Stadium | 2024 Wales rugby union tour of Australia | 6 July 2024 | Win | 25–16 |
| 4 | Wales | Melbourne, Australia | Melbourne Rectangular Stadium | 2024 Wales rugby union tour of Australia | 13 July 2024 | Win | 36–28 |
| 5 | Wales | Melbourne, Australia | Melbourne Rectangular Stadium | 2024 Wales rugby union tour of Australia | 13 July 2024 | Win | 36–28 |
| 6 | Argentina | Sydney, Australia | Sydney Football Stadium | 2025 Rugby Championship | 13 September 2025 | Loss | 26–28 |
| 7 | New Zealand | Sydney, Australia | Stadium Australia | 2026 Bledisloe Cup | 17 October 2026 | Loss | 21–43 |
| 8 | England | London, England | Twickenham Stadium | 2026 Nations Championship | 8 November 2026 | Loss | 45–22 |

== Super Rugby statistics ==
As of 24 June 2023

| Season | Team | Apps | Start | Sub | Mins | T | C | PG | DG | Pts | YC | RC |
|---|---|---|---|---|---|---|---|---|---|---|---|---|
| 2018 | Reds | 14 | 11 | 3 | 913 | 6 | 2 | 1 | 0 | 37 | 0 | 0 |
| 2019 | Reds | 7 | 6 | 1 | 396 | 0 | 0 | 0 | 0 | 0 | 0 | 0 |
| 2020 | Reds | 3 | 0 | 3 | 60 | 0 | 0 | 0 | 0 | 0 | 0 | 0 |
| 2020 AU | Reds | 10 | 10 | 0 | 794 | 6 | 0 | 0 | 0 | 30 | 1 | 0 |
| 2021 AU | Reds | 8 | 5 | 3 | 452 | 4 | 0 | 0 | 0 | 20 | 0 | 0 |
| 2021 | Reds | 5 | 4 | 1 | 332 | 2 | 0 | 1 | 0 | 13 | 1 | 0 |
| 2022 | Reds | 10 | 8 | 2 | 674 | 2 | 0 | 0 | 0 | 10 | 1 | 0 |
| 2023 | Reds | 12 | 10 | 2 | 787 | 2 | 0 | 0 | 0 | 10 | 0 | 0 |
| Total | | 69 | 54 | 15 | 4,408 | 20 | 2 | 2 | 0 | 120 | 3 | 0 |
