= Richie Asiata =

Australian rugby union player

- Born: 3 May 1996 (age 30) Auckland, New Zealand
- Height: 1.80 m (5 ft 11 in)
- Weight: 120 kg (19 st; 260 lb)

Rugby union career
- Position: Hooker
Senior career
Years	Team	Apps	(Points)
2016–2019	Queensland Country	20	(11)
2019–2020	Toronto Arrows	5	(0)
2020–2026	Reds	51	(75)
2024	Northland	9	(0)
2025	Benetton	1	(0)
2026	Tasman	7	(5)
2026-	Leicester Tigers	1	(0)
- Correct as of 26 October 2026
International career
Years	Team	Apps	(Points)
2016	Australia U20	5	(0)
2025	First Nations & Pasifika XV	1	(0)
2026–	Samoa	2	(5)
- Correct as of 24 September 2026

Richie Asiata (born 3 May 1996) is an Australian-Samoan rugby union player currently playing for Leicester Tigers in England's PREM Rugby. He previously played for the Queensland Reds in Super Rugby and Tasman in the Bunnings NPC. His position is hooker.

== Professional career ==
Asiata signed for Major League Rugby side Toronto Arrows ahead of the 2020 Major League Rugby season, and re-signed ahead of the 2021 Major League Rugby season. He previously represented Queensland Country in the National Rugby Championship (NRC) between 2016 and 2018.

In July 2025, the Queensland Reds announced a partnership deal with Italian club Benetton in the United Rugby Championship. As part of the deal, Asiata and three other Reds players (John Bryant, Louis Werchon, Josh Flook) joined the club on a three month loan spell ahead of the 2025–26 United Rugby Championship season. He made his debut in Round 1 of the 2025–26 season against Connacht.

In October 2026, Asiata signed as injury cover for Leicester Tigers in PREM Rugby, and made his debut as a replacement on 24 October 2026 in a Leicester win against Northampton Saints.

== Personal life ==
Asiata is of Samoan heritage.
