= Bongi Mbonambi =

South African rugby union player

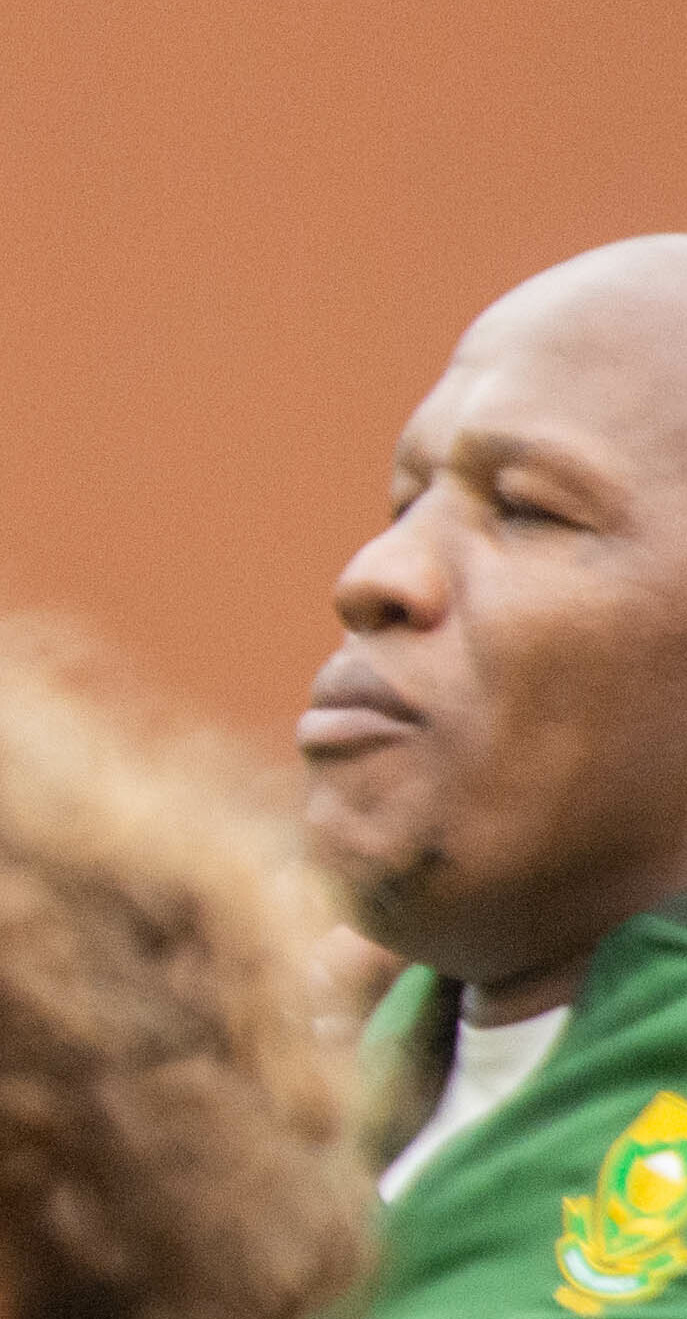
- Full name: Mbongeni Theo Mbonambi
- Born: 7 January 1991 (age 35) Bethlehem, Orange Free State, South Africa
- Height: 1.77 m (5 ft 9 1/2 in)
- Weight: 108 kg (17 st 0 lb; 238 lb)
- School: St. Alban's College
- University: TUT

Rugby union career
- Position: Hooker
- Current team: Sharks / Sharks (Currie Cup)
Youth career
- 2007: Griffons
- 2008–2012: Blue Bulls
Amateur team(s)
Years	Team	Apps	(Points)
2011	TUT Vikings	3	(0)
2013–2014	UP Tuks	8	(5)
Senior career
Years	Team	Apps	(Points)
2012–2014	Blue Bulls	30	(5)
2012–2014	Bulls	15	(0)
2015–2021	Stormers	73	(25)
2015–2021	Western Province	29	(30)
2021–2026	Sharks	59	(95)
2026–	Stormers	0	(0)
- Correct as of 17 January 2026
International career
Years	Team	Apps	(Points)
2009	South Africa Schools		
2011	South Africa Under-20	5	(0)
2016–present	South Africa	82	(75)
2016	Springbok XV	1	(0)
- Correct as of 29 November 2025
Medal record
Men's Rugby union
Representing South Africa
Rugby World Cup
Gold medal – first place	2019 Japan	Squad
Gold medal – first place	2023 France	Squad

Mbongeni Theo Mbonambi (born 7 January 1991), known mononymously as Bongi, is a South African professional rugby union player. He currently plays as a hooker for the Stormers as well as the South Africa national rugby team. He previously played for the Blue Bulls and Sharks, making his senior debut during the 2012 Super Rugby season for the Bulls in a match against the Crusaders in Pretoria. Mbonambi was a member of the South Africa Under 20 team that competed in the 2011 IRB Junior World Championship.

== International rugby ==
On 28 May 2016, Mbonambi was included in a 31-man South Africa squad for their three-test match series against a touring Ireland team. Mbonambi was named in South Africa's squad for the 2019 Rugby World Cup. South Africa went on to win the tournament, defeating England 32-12 in the final. Mbonambi was also named in South Africa's squad for the 2023 Rugby World Cup.

In the semi-final match of the 2023 Rugby World Cup against England, Mbonambi was accused of making a racial slur against Tom Curry. It was speculated that Mbonambi used the term "wit kant" in Afrikaans, meaning "white side". After investigating the allegation, World Rugby found insufficient evidence and closed the case.

== Honours ==
South Africa

- Rugby World Cup winner: 2019, 2023
- 2025 Rugby Championship winner

== Test match record ==
As of 29 November 2025

Against	P	W	D	L	Try	Pts	%Won
Argentina	11	10	0	1	1	5	90.91
Australia	9	4	0	5	2	10	44.44
British & Irish Lions	3	2	0	1	0	0	66.67
England	9	6	0	3	0	0	66.67
France	6	5	0	1	1	5	83.33
Georgia	2	2	0	0	1	5	100
Ireland	6	2	0	4	0	0	33.33
Italy	5	4	0	1	3	15	80
Japan	2	2	0	0	0	0	100
Namibia	1	1	0	0	2	10	100
New Zealand	14	7	1	6	2	10	50
Romania	1	1	0	0	0	0	100
Scotland	4	4	0	0	0	0	100
Wales	9	7	0	2	3	15	77.78
Total	82	57	1	24	15	75	69.51

Pld = Games Played, W = Games Won, D = Games Drawn, L = Games Lost, Tri = Tries Scored, Pts = Points Scored

=== International tries ===
As of 15 September 2025

Try	Opposing team	Location	Venue	Competition	Date	Result	Score
1	Italy	Padua, Italy	Stadio Euganeo	2017 end-of-year tests	25 November 2017	Win	6–35
2	Australia	Brisbane, Australia	Lang Park	2018 Rugby Championship	8 September 2018	Loss	23–18
3	France	Saint-Denis, France	Stade de France	2018 end-of-year tests	10 November 2018	Win	26–29
4	Argentina	Salta, Argentina	Estadio Padre Ernesto Martearena	2019 Rugby Championship	10 August 2019	Win	13–46
5	Namibia	Toyota, Japan	Toyota Stadium	2019 Rugby World Cup Pool B match	28 September 2019	Win	57–3
6	Namibia	Toyota, Japan	Toyota Stadium	2019 Rugby World Cup Pool B match	28 September 2019	Win	57–3
7	Italy	Fukuroi, Japan	Shizuoka Stadium	2019 Rugby World Cup Pool B match	4 October 2019	Win	49–3
8	Georgia	Pretoria, Johannesburg	Loftus Versfeld Stadium	2021 mid-year tests	2 July 2021	Win	40–9
9	Australia	Gold Coast, Australia	Robina Stadium	2021 Rugby Championship	12 September 2021	Loss	28–26
10	Wales	Pretoria, South Africa	Loftus Versfeld Stadium	2022 Wales tour of South Africa	2 July 2022	Win	32–29
11	Wales	Cape Town, South Africa	Cape Town Stadium	2022 Wales tour of South Africa	16 July 2022	Win	30–14
12	Italy	Genoa, Italy	Stadio Luigi Ferraris	2022 end-of-year tests	19 November 2022	Win	21–63
13	New Zealand	London, England	Twickenham Stadium	2023 Rugby World Cup warm-up matches	25 August 2023	Win	7–35
14	Wales	London, England	Twickenham Stadium	2024 mid-year tests	22 June 2024	Win	41–13
15	New Zealand	Johannesburg, South Africa	Ellis Park Stadium	2024 Rugby Championship	31 August 2024	Win	31–27
