= Alice Evans (footballer) =

Welsh futsal/footballer

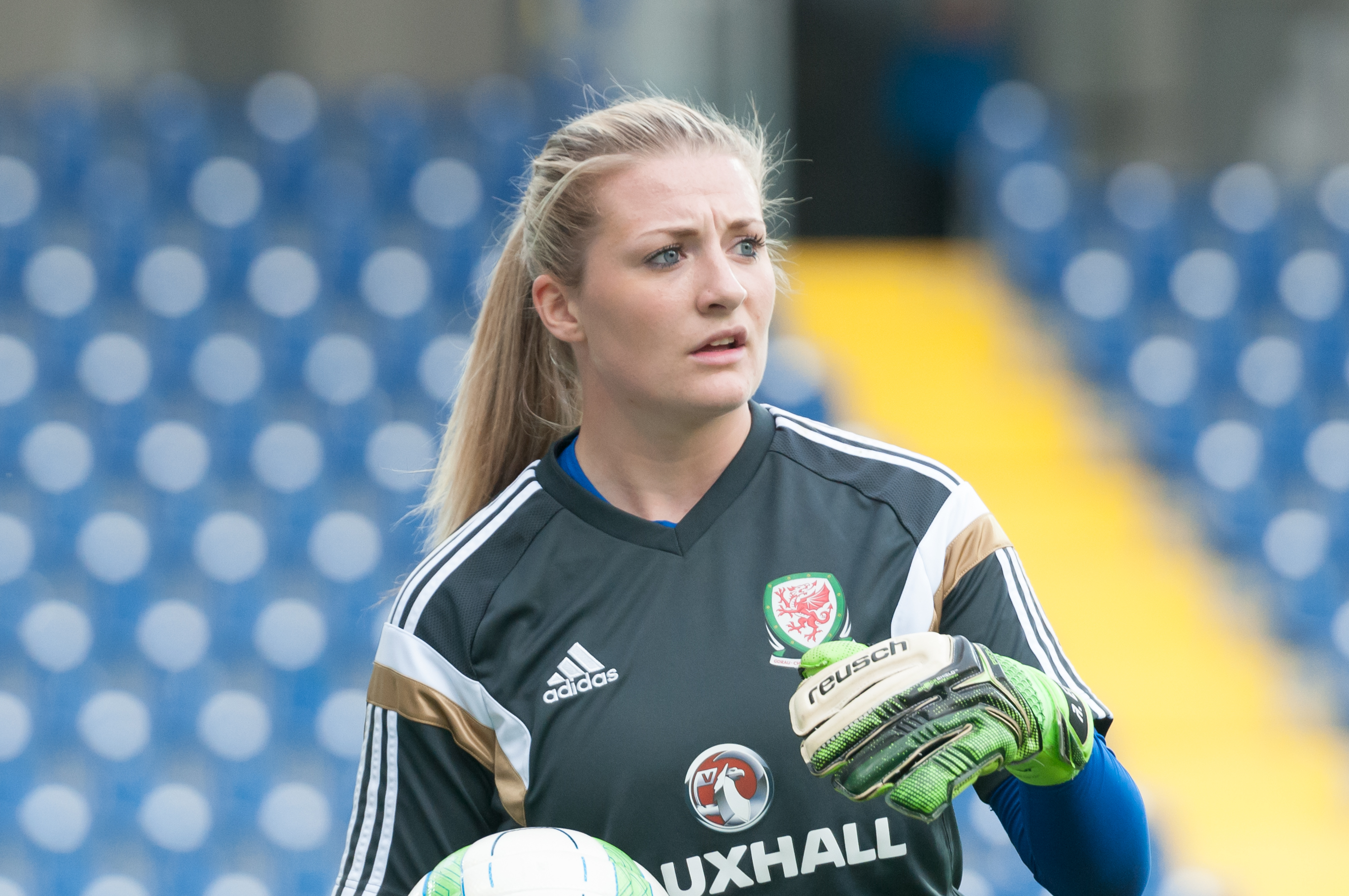

Personal information
- Full name: Alice Victoria Evans
- Date of birth: 22 July 1994 (age 32)
- Place of birth: Aberystwyth, Wales
- Height: 5 ft 8 in (1.73 m)
- Position: Goalkeeper

Team information
- Current team: Santu Predu
- Number: 1

Senior career*
Years	Team	Apps	(Gls)
2012–2013	Cardiff City		
2013–2014	Yeovil Town		
2014–2015	Bristol City		
2015	Yeovil Town		

International career
2013	Wales U19	15	(0)
2015	Wales	9	(0)
- * Club domestic league appearances and goals

Alice Evans (born 22 July 1994) is a Welsh professional futsal player. She previously played for the Wales football team where she was the goalkeeper. After playing for Cardiff City and Yeovil Town, she joined Bristol Academy in 2014 but returned to Yeovil a year later. She made her Senior international debut for the Wales football team in 2015.

She is also the first British female futsal player to gain a professional contract. She first did this when she joined Italian side Sinnai in 2015, where she competed for a season in the top flight division. In 2020 she joined newly promoted Santu Predu in the Italian second division. This is currently where she is still playing.

== Early life ==
Evans was born in Aberystwyth to Neil and Catrin Evans. She attended Ysgol Gymraeg Aberystwyth before the family moved to Builth Wells, where she attended Builth Wells High School. She has one brother, Jack, and a sister, Emily.

== Club career ==
Evans began her senior career with Cardiff City before joining Yeovil Town in 2012. She established herself as Yeovil's first choice goalkeeper during the 2013–14 season. Her performances prompted FA Women's Super League One side Bristol Academy to sign her during the summer of 2014 to provide competition for Mary Earps. However, she returned to Yeovil after a single season.

=== Futsal ===
Alongside her football career, Evans also played futsal for Bristol City and helped the side win the FA Women's Futsal Cup. She has played futsal in the UK for Hartpury College. Bath, Wrexham and Cheshire.

In 2015, she was invited for a trial with professional Italian Serie A futsal side Sinnai after they approached her coach. She impressed enough to be offered a contract. In doing so, Evans became the first professional British female futsal player.

== International career ==
Having represented Wales at under 16's and under-19 level, Evans made her Euro qualifier debut for the Wales senior side in a 4–0 defeat to Norway on 23 October 2015 in a UEFA Women's Euro 2017 qualifying match.

== Personal life ==
Evans attended the University of Bath where she studied for a BSc in sports performance. In June 2015, she was one of four students chosen to travel to Zambia as part of the university's sports programme to provide PE lessons and sporting competitions in the country. She also played rugby for the university team.

She later moved to Brecon and, in February 2018, she took up a role as a community education officer with the Mid and West Wales Fire and Rescue Service.
