= Kemsley Mathias =

Welsh rugby union player (born 1999)

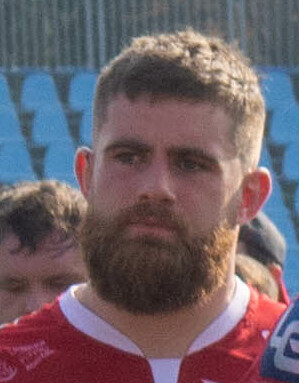
- Mathias representing Scarlets during the United Rugby Championship
- Born: 29 July 1999 (age 27) Haverfordwest, Wales
- Height: 1.85 m (6 ft 1 in)
- Weight: 121 kg (267 lb; 19 st 1 lb)
- School: Tasker Milward Voluntary Controlled School
- University: University of Wales Trinity Saint David

Rugby union career
- Position: Prop
- Current team: Scarlets
Senior career
Years	Team	Apps	(Points)
2021–	Scarlets	56	(20)
International career
Years	Team	Apps	(Points)
2018–2019	Wales U20	11	(0)
2023–	Wales	6	(0)

Kemsley Mathias (born 29 July 1999) is a Welsh professional rugby union player who plays as a prop for United Rugby Championship club Scarlets and the Wales national team.

== Club career ==
=== Amateur ===
Mathias first played tag rugby for Llangwm RFC, before stepping up to Narberth RFC, where he played alongside future Scarlets teammate Ryan Conbeer. Mathias joined the Scarlets academy, and was also registered to local clubs Carmarthen Quins RFC and Llandovery RFC.

=== Scarlets ===
Mathias was named in the Scarlets first-team squad for the 2020–21 Pro14 season. Originally slated to make a possible debut off the bench along with fellow academy product Iestyn Rees in the EPCR Challenge Cup match against Toulon on 18 December 2020, Mathias was forced to wait, as the match was called off due to COVID-19 cases. He finally made his Scarlets debut in Round 11 of the 2020–21 Pro14 against Cardiff Blues. On 29 May 2021, Mathias signed his first professional contract with the Scarlets.

In 2021, Mathias completed a degree in Exercise and Sport Science at University of Wales Trinity Saint David, while pursuing his rugby career.

Mathias scored his first try for the Scarlets on 27 January 2023, in the 37–28 win over the Bulls. Mathias signed a contract extension with the Scarlets on 20 April 2023, along with fellow prop Sam Wainwright.

On 30 April 2025, Mathias signed a further contract extension.

== International career ==
=== Wales U18 and U20 ===
While attending Sir Thomas Picton School, Mathias was selected for Wales U18 on their tour to South Africa in 2017, starting against England and scoring a try in the win. The following year, Mathias was first selected for Wales U20, and made 11 appearances for the side over two seasons. Mathias was part of the team what beat New Zealand U20 in the 2019 World Rugby Under 20 Championship.

=== Wales ===
On 1 May 2023, Mathias was called up to the Wales 54-man training squad ahead of the 2023 Rugby World Cup. Mathias made his debut on 12 August 2023, coming off the bench against England in the 2023 Rugby World Cup warm-up matches.

Mathias was named in the Wales squad for the 2024 Six Nations Championship, and came off the bench in the final match against Italy.
