= Alice Margaret Evans =

British botanist

- Born: 12 August 1927; Penderyn, Wales
- Died: 26 March 1981 (aged 53)
- Education: University College of Wales, Aberystwyth
- Scientific career
- Fields: botany
- Thesis: Interspecific relationships within the genera Trifolium and Medicago (1957)

Alice Margaret Evans (1927–1981) was a Welsh botanist. She worked at the Welsh Plant Breeding Station and the University of Cambridge, specialising in crop improvement through genetic-led breeding programmes, initially in forage crops and then in beans.

== Education and personal life ==
Evans was born 12 August 1927 into a farming family living near Penderyn, South Wales. She graduated in botany from University College of Wales, Aberystwyth in 1943. She then studied cytology at Lund University in Sweden. In 1950 she worked on forage crops at the Welsh Plant Breeding Station, specifically clover and Medicago species. Her doctoral degree was awarded for this work.

== Botanical career ==
In 1964 Evans was appointed to teach agricultural botany at University of Reading. In 1968 she was appointed as a lecturer in the School of Agriculture at University of Cambridge, where she remained until she died in 1981. Her research focused on beans, especially the common bean, Phaseolus vulgaris. She collaboration with Joseph Hutchinson, a specialist in the genetics and evolution of crop plants at Cambridge, to develop a bean breeding programme and then managed it herself. One aim was to create a gene bank for beans, and another to develop a better variety of dwarf bean for UK production.

In 1970 this work was funded by the UK government through the Ministry of Overseas Development and involved a collaboration with Colin Leakey at Makerere University in Uganda. This ended in 1973 due to political changes in Uganda. Evans then formed a collaboration with International Institute of Tropical Agriculture in Nigeria on breeding better cowpeas (Vigna unguiculate) and another in 1976 with International Center for Tropical Agriculture in Columbia to improve the protein content of beans and the number of seeds per pod. This second project ended in 1980 when the funding stopped.

During her research, Evans developed a classification system for beans that became the basis for future development of bean varieties. The gene bank of bean varieties had developed to contain 5,000 accessions by 1979.

As well managing as these international research programmes, Evans led development of a new M. Phil. degree at Cambridge and supervised several doctoral students.

Evans died on 26 March 1981, aged 53.

== Awards and honours ==
From 1976 Evans chaired the crop committee of the recently formed international research-for-development organisation International Board for Plant Genetic Resources based in Rome.

== Publications ==
Evans was the author or co-author of scientific publications and book chapters. These included:

- A. M. Evans & H.E. Gridley, 1978. Prospects for the improvement of protein and yield content in food legumes. Current Advances in Plant Science. No. 32, p. 1-17.
- J. H. C. Davis and A. M. Evans (1977) Selection indices using plant type characteristics in Navy beans (Phaseolus vulgaris L.), The Journal of Agricultural Science, 89, (2) pp. 341 - 348.
- A. M. Evans (1976) Beans, Phaseolus spp. (Leguminoseae-Papilionatae). In Evolution of Crop Plants, ed. N.W. Simmonds, Longmans, p. 168—172.
- A. M. Evans (1962) . Species hybridization in Trifolium . I. Methods of overcoming species incompatibility. Euphitica 11 p. 64–176
- A. M. Evans (1955) The production and identification of polyploids in red clover, white clover and lucerne. New Phytologist 54 p. 149–62.
