= Christ Tshiunza =

Welsh rugby union player

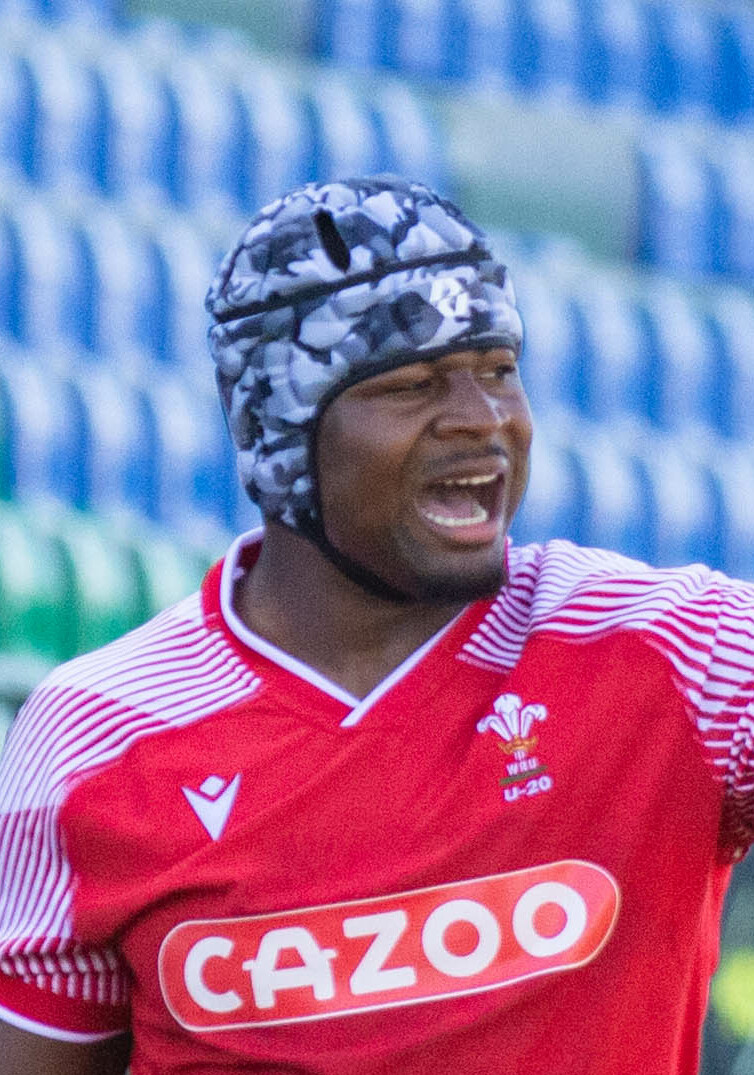
- Christ Tshiunza
- Born: 9 January 2002 (age 24) Kinshasa, Democratic Republic of the Congo
- Height: 1.98 m (6 ft 6 in)
- Weight: 115 kg (18.1 st; 254 lb)
- School: Whitchurch High School
- University: University of Exeter

Rugby union career
- Position: Lock
Senior career
Years	Team	Apps	(Points)
2021–2026	Exeter Chiefs	47	(15)
2026–	Sale Sharks	0	(0)
International career
Years	Team	Apps	(Points)
2021–2022	Wales U20	8	(10)
2021–	Wales	15	(0)

Christ Tshiunza (born 9 January 2002) is a Welsh rugby union player who plays as a lock or flanker for Sale Sharks in the English Premiership. Tshiunza has represented Wales and Wales U20. Tshiunza competed in the 2023 Rugby World Cup.

== Early life ==
Born in Kinshasa, Democratic Republic of the Congo, to a Congolese family, he moved to Wales in 2010. Tshiunza holds both French and Congolese nationalities from his parents. Tshiunza speaks 3 languages. He attended Whitchurch High School in Cardiff.

In an interview with The Times, he said: “I can’t even paint the picture. There were six of us in a one-bedroom flat. We put a single bed on the floor that I would share, two or three on the bed... Fitting in at the start was strange because you can’t communicate. I played football and tried to make friends that way. It was tough to start off with. But everyone in my primary school made an effort. Imagine being friends with someone you couldn’t speak to. I found everyone was really nice and that is why Wales resonates with my heart.”

== Club career ==
He was part of the Cardiff Blues academy, before going to study at University of Exeter, where he was signed by the Chiefs on a four-year contract.

On 18 September 2021, Tshiunza made his debut for Exeter Chiefs, appearing off the bench against Leicester Tigers.

Tshiunza was named man of the match on 25 September 2022, as the Chiefs beat Premiership champions Harlequins 43–42, as he scored the winning try after full time. He scored his first try in the Champions Cup on 21 January 2023, as the Chiefs beat Castres 40–3 to secure their place in the knockouts.

On 26 March 2026, Tshiunza announced he would leave Exeter Chiefs to join Premiership rivals Sale Sharks for the 2026-27 season.

== International career ==
At international level, before making his debut for Wales in 2021, he was qualified to play for England, Wales or France, as well as the DR Congo. He played in a friendly match for England Under-20s in March 2021. He was then called up by Wales for the 2021 Six Nations Under 20s Championship, playing in four of their five matches and scoring the opening try in the final match against Scotland.

In October 2021, he was called up to the Wales senior team for their Autumn international series against New Zealand, South Africa, Fiji and Australia. He made his international debut against Fiji at the Millennium Stadium on 14 November 2021.

A hamstring injury ruled Tshiunza out of contention for the 2022 Six Nations Championship.

Tshiunza returned to Wales U20 in July 2022, for the U20 Summer Series, scoring against Italy, and reaching the final to play South Africa.

On 18 October 2022 Tshiunza was selected in the squad for the 2022 end-of-year rugby union internationals, and came off the bench in the first test against New Zealand. Tshiunza missed the following match against Argentina due to injury, and was unavailable for the final match against Australia due to the match falling outside the designated test window.

Tshiunza was named in the Wales squad for the 2023 Six Nations Championship.
