= Josh Flook =

Australian rugby union player (born 2001)

- Born: 22 September 2001 (age 25) Randwick, New South Wales, Australia
- Height: 1.86 m (6 ft 1 in)
- Weight: 92 kg (203 lb; 14 st 7 lb)
- School: St. Joseph's Nudgee College

Rugby union career
- Position(s): Centre, Wing
- Current team: Queensland Reds
Senior career
Years	Team	Apps	(Points)
2020–	Queensland Reds	69	(125)
2025	→ Benetton (loan)	0	(0)
2026–	Benetton	0	(0)
- Correct as of 6 June 2026
International career
Years	Team	Apps	(Points)
2019	Australia U18		
2020	Australia U20		
2023	Australia A	2	(6)
2024–	Australia	6	(5)
- Correct as of 25 October 2025

Joshua Flook (born 22 September 2001) is an Australian professional rugby union player who plays as a centre for the Queensland Reds in the Super Rugby and the Australia national team.

== Background and early career ==
Flook was born in Sydney, New South Wales, before relocating to Brisbane, Queensland, where he was raised.

== Professional career ==
=== Reds ===
Flook was named in the Reds squad in the first round of the 2020 Super Rugby AU season. He made his debut for the Reds in the second round of the season against the Rebels, coming on as a replacement for left wing Filipo Daugunu in the 73rd minute. The game result finished 18-all after extra-time at Brookvale Oval.

In 2021, Flook played seven matches for the Reds across their 2021 Super Rugby AU and Trans-Tasman seasons, including the Super Rugby AU Grand Final which saw the Reds win 19–16 in Brisbane. It was their first Super Rugby-related title since 2011.

=== Benetton ===
It was reported by The Australian on 10 March 2026 that Flook had signed with Italian club Benetton in the United Rugby Championship (URC). It was confirmed a week later that Flook would be moving at the end of the season on a one-year deal with an option to extend it for another year. Flook had previously been one of four players that joined Benetton on a Reds–Benetton player loan deal for their 2025–26 season. However, Flook was later called-up to the national squad and was ruled out of playing for Benetton. Upon his transfer, Flook stated to ABC News: "Talking to some people, the feedback I got was that I wasn't really sure how I'd match up against the Scottish and South African centres, if I was to go up against them. So I thought, 'Why not go and test myself in that [United Rugby Championship] competition and prove to myself and others that I might be a little bit smaller but can put up a hell of a fight?"

== International career ==
In July 2023, ahead of Australia A's two 2023 Rugby World Cup warm-up matches, Flook was named in a 25-player squad. Leading into the series, Flook had started in thirteen of the Reds' fifteen Super Rugby matches for the 2023 season. Flook scored his first senior international try for Australia A against Tonga in a 27–21 loss at Teufaiva Sport Stadium, Nukuʻalofa. Flook played in the team's other match against Portugal. Australia A won 17–30 in Massy, France.

Flook made his Test debut for Australia against Wales on 6 July 2024 at the Sydney Football Stadium. Flook was one of six Wallaby debutants to play in the match the first of two on Wales' 2024 tour of Australia. Flook started again in the following Test. Australia won both matches and whitewashed the series, the first inbound whitewash tour since France in 2014. Flook later made his first appearance in the Rugby Championship in September against Argentina. Flook came off the bench in the 66th minute. Australia lost 67–27, their worst defeat against them. Since 2025 Flook has made just three appearances for the Wallabies.
