= Sport on the Sunshine Coast =

Queensland's Sunshine Coast has sporting teams across national, state, and local levels. Some Coast based clubs trace their history back to the early 20th century.

The most recent club to be established on the Sunshine Coast is the Sunshine Coast Lightning who compete in the national Suncorp Super Netball competition.

== Sports ==
=== Australian rules football ===
The Caloundra Panthers, Maroochydore Roos and Noosa Tigers all compete in the Queensland Football Associations division 1 competition alongside other South East Queensland clubs. The Hinterland Blues and Gympie play in division 3 of the same competition and Maroochydores 3rd XVIII plays in Division 4.

=== Beach Volleyball ===
Sunshine Coast Beach Volleyball is a not-for profit organisation which manages public volleyball courts at mooloolaba, weekly social competitions, weekly training, junior competitions and monthly tournaments. Ex Olympic coach Peter "Chico" Jones runs training's and promotes the sport through the organisation.

=== Cricket ===
The Sunshine Coast Cricket Association is the region's cricket competition. The competition has been established for over sixty years.

=== Netball ===
The Sunshine Coast region has several district netball competitions based out of Nambour, Maroochydore and Caloundra.

The Sunshine Coast Lightning compete in the Suncorp Super Netball league. They are the first national level sporting team based in the region, and play their home games at the University of the Sunshine Coast's indoor arena.

=== Soccer ===
Sunshine Coast Football runs the region's primary association football competition. It has 10 clubs playing in its top division. In late 2018 it was announced that Sunshine Coast Football had admitted an additional 4 Gympie-based clubs (Columbia, Golden City, Gympie Diggers, Gympie Lions) and Baringa from the new Aura/Bellvista/Bells Reach development near Caloundra as part of its 2019 competitions taking the total number of affiliated clubs to 23.

The Sunshine Churches Soccer Association also has 19 clubs and 3,950 registered players both juniors, senior men and women.

The Sunshine Coast is currently represented in the state level National Premier League Queensland by Sunshine Coast Wanderers FC.

=== Rugby league ===
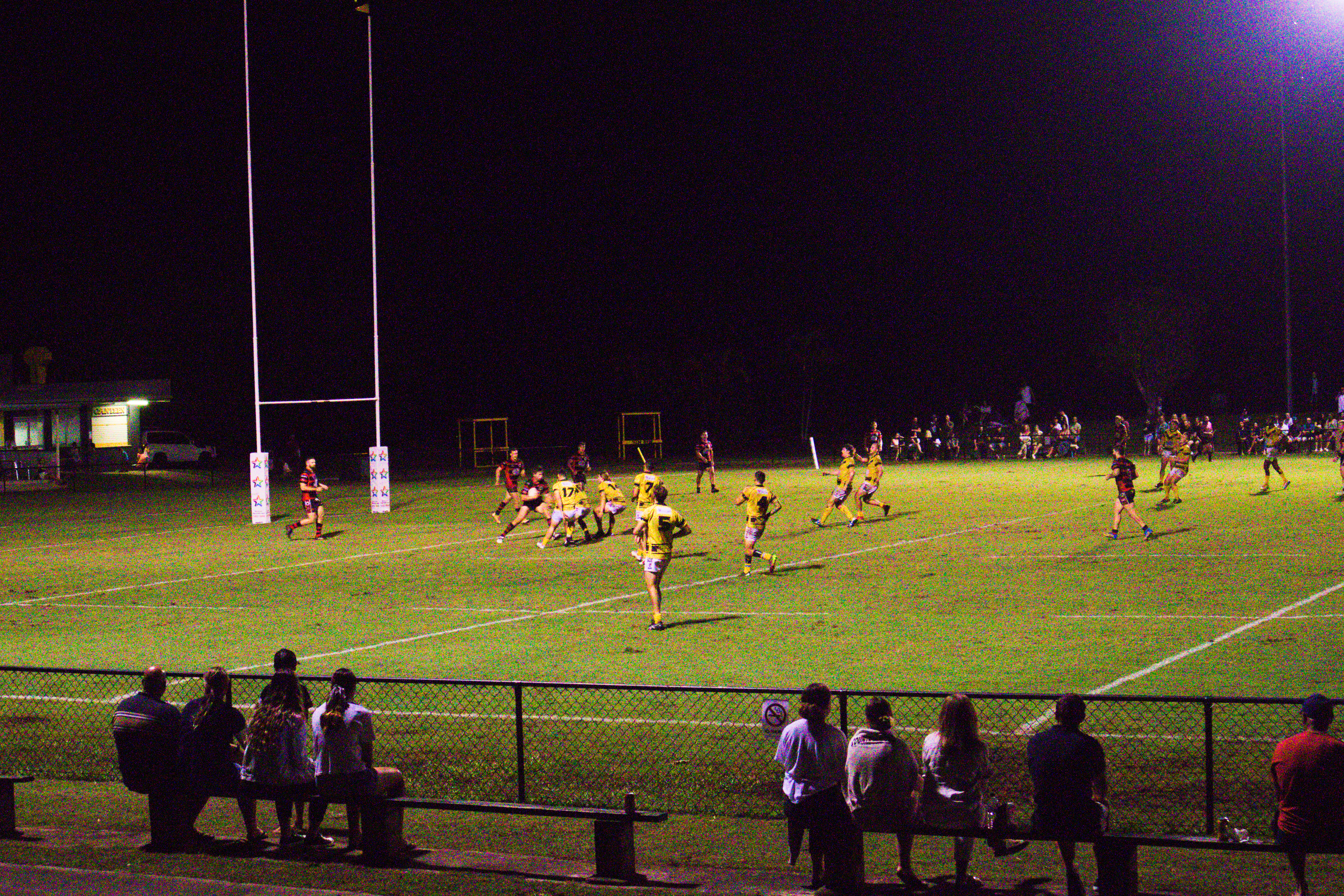
Caloundra playing Stanley River in the 2021 Sunshine Coast Gympie Rugby League season.

The Sunshine Coast Falcons compete in the Queensland Cup and serve as a feeder club for the professional Melbourne Storm that compete in the National Rugby League.

A local competition originally formed in 1920 when all of the clubs playing rugby union at the time switched codes.

=== Rugby union ===
Sunshine Coast Rugby Union Round 4 2014 game between University and Maroochydore

The Sunshine Coast Rugby Union runs the local rugby union competition. Its top division – referred to as A grade – has six teams contesting the 2019 season, up from four the two seasons prior. These clubs are Noosa, Maroochydore, university, Wynnum Caboolture and Caloundra.

The second division – reserve grade or reggies – has the six A grade clubs as well as Eumundi, Gympie, Nambour, and Maleny.

=== Roller derby ===
Roller Derby is played out of the Caloundra Indoor Stadium.

Coastal Assassins Roller Derby is a roller derby league based out of the Sunshine Coast. Most of their home games are played out of the Caloundra Indoor Stadium.

Their travel team participates in the Tropicarnage Cup.

They are currently ranked 137th in the world by the WFTDA.

== Media ==
Local media regularly cover all four football codes and cricket. Win and Seven provide a coverage in half hour bulletins during the week.

The Sunshine Coast Daily does written coverage on Mondays and Fridays.

Individuals provide their own coverage on their own websites and YouTube channels.

Wikinews has previously provided coverage of the Sunshine Coast Rugby Union, Coastal Assassins Roller Derby and Sunshine Coast Cricket Association.
