= Ipswich, Queensland =

Ipswich
- City
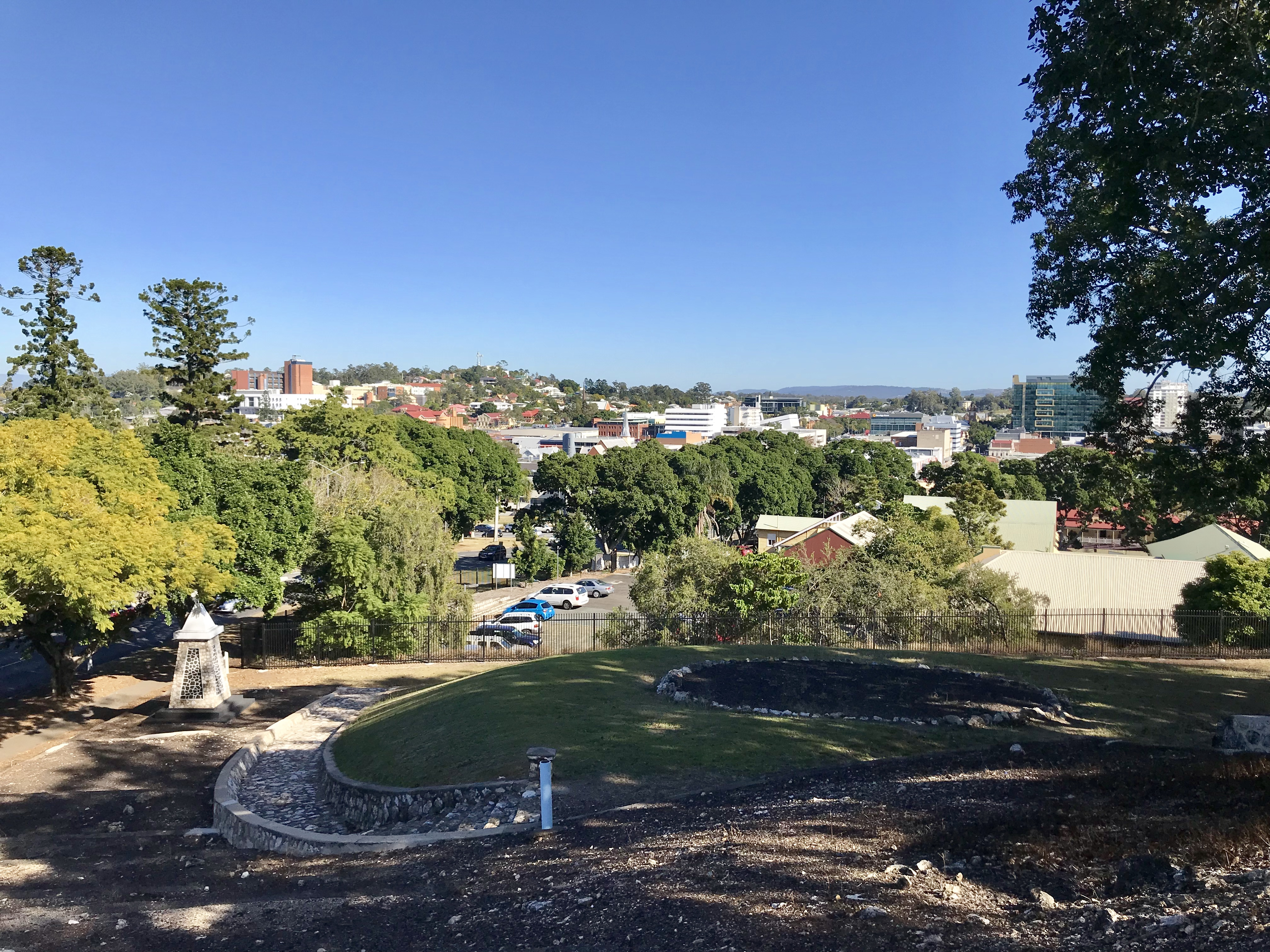
- Ipswich from Cunninghams Knoll

- Coordinates: 27.6144°S 152.7608°E
- Country: Australia
- State: Queensland
- Region: South East Queensland
- LGA: City of Ipswich
- Location: 42.7 km (26.5 mi) SW of Brisbane CBD
- Established: 1827

Government
  - State electorates: Ipswich; Ipswich West; Bundamba; Lockyer; Jordan
  - Federal divisions: Blair; Oxley; Wright
- Elevation: 50 m (160 ft)

Population
  - Total: 115,913 (2021)
- Time zone: UTC+10:00 (AEST)
- Postcode: 4305

Ipswich (/ˈɪpswɪtʃ/) is an urban centre within the City of Ipswich in South East Queensland, Australia. Situated on the Bremer River, it is approximately 40 km (25 mi) west of the Brisbane central business district. Ipswich is renowned for its architectural, natural and cultural heritage, and the city preserves and operates from many of its historical buildings, with more than 6000 heritage-listed sites and over 500 parks. Ipswich was founded in 1827 as a mining settlement, and soon developed into a major commercial and population centre. The suburb of the same name serves as the city's central business district. In the 2021 census, the population of the urban area of Ipswich was 115,913 people.

== History ==
=== Early history ===
Ipswich was tribally known as Coodjirar in the Yugararpul language.

Known as the Ugarapul and Yuggerabul people are Australian Aboriginal languages of South-East Queensland. Ipswich City Council, Lockyer Regional Council and the Somerset Regional Council. The languages of Greater Brisbane are related – there is uncertainty over which dialects belong to which language. The Yugarabul language region includes the landscape within the local government boundaries of Brisbane City Council, Ipswich City Council and the Scenic Rim Regional Council.

Prior to the arrival of European settlers, what is now called Ipswich was home to one indigenous language groups, including the Warpai tribe, Yuggera and Ugarapul Indigenous Australian groups. The area was first explored by European colonists in 1826, when Captain Patrick Logan, Commandant of the Moreton Bay penal colony, sailed up the Brisbane River and discovered large deposits of limestone and other minerals.

=== Settlement ===
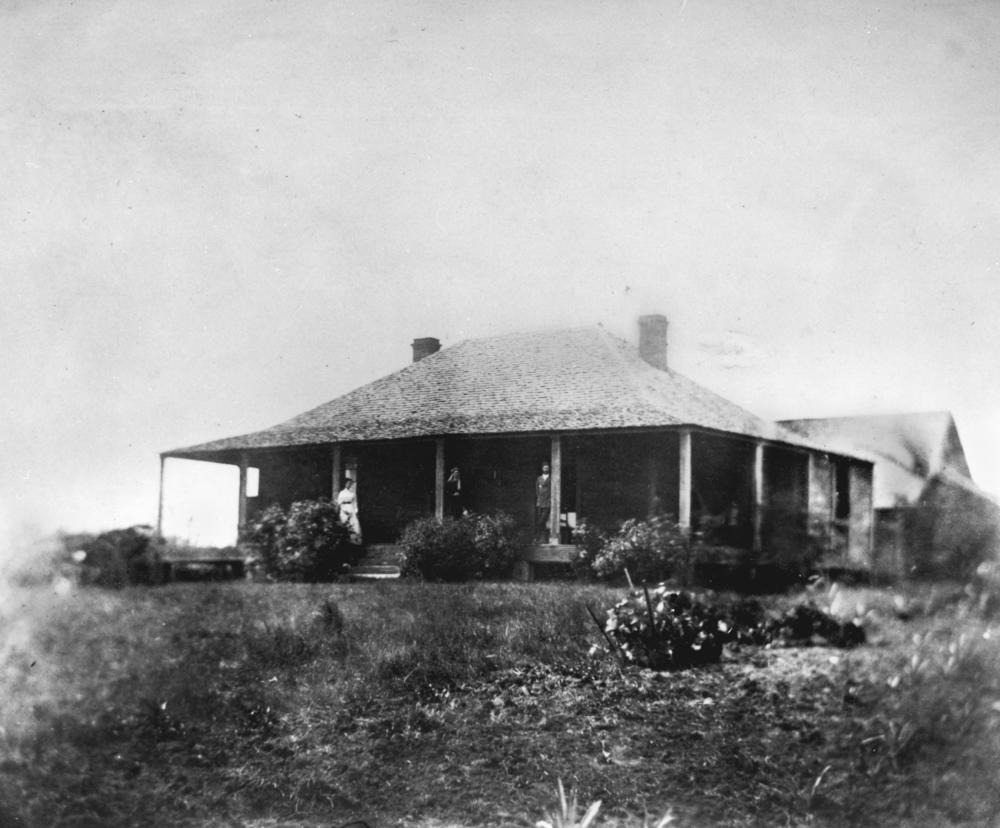
Waterfield; an early West Ipswich residence pictured in 1868

The town began in 1827 as a limestone mining settlement and grew rapidly as a major inland port. Ipswich was initially named "The Limestone Hills" and later shortened to "Limestone", however in 1843 it was renamed after the town of Ipswich in England. The population was 932 in 1851 and had risen to 2459 by 1856. It became a municipality in 1858. Ipswich had been a prime candidate for becoming the capital of Queensland from about 1847 when the Rev. John Dunmore Lang had toured both Ipswich and Brisbane, and noted the strength of Ipswich as a port town with access to the wool suppliers of the Darling Downs, but Brisbane was instead chosen due to its mercantile and colonial interests. Brisbane was declared the capital of the new Crown Colony of Queensland in 1859. It was proclaimed a city in 1904.

The city became a major coal-mining area in the early 19th Century, contributing to the development of railways in the region as a means of transport. The first recorded coal mines in the central Ipswich area started at Woodend in 1848. Triassic aged dinosaur footprints were found in underground coal mines in the vicinity of the suburbs of Ebbw Vale and New Chum while large numbers of Jurassic aged dinosaur footprints have been reported from the suburb of Rosewood.

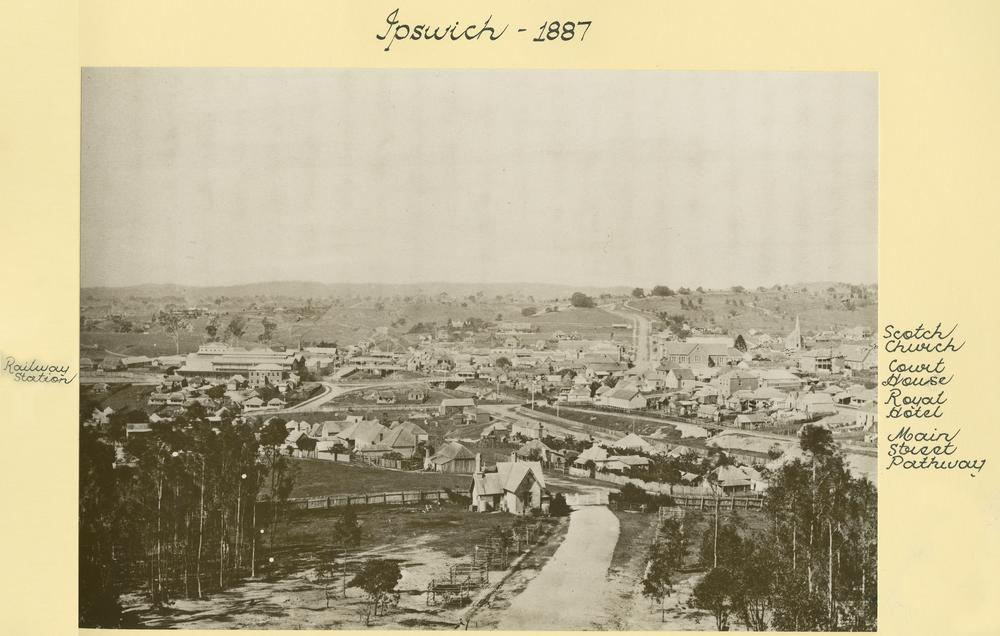
A view of Ipswich in 1887

From the 1840s onward, Ipswich was becoming an important river port for growing local industries such as coal and wool from the Darling Downs and a regular paddlesteamer service from Brisbane Town, The Experiment, was established in 1846. This, and other steamer services, remained the primary form of mass/bulk transport between the two cities until 1876, when the construction of the original Albert Bridge, spanning the Brisbane River at Indooroopilly, completed the railway line begun between Ipswich and Brisbane in 1873.

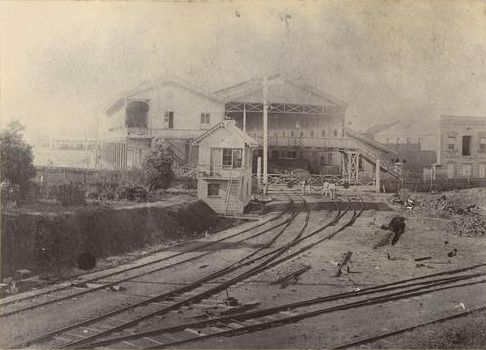
Ipswich Railway Station in 1865

Ipswich was proclaimed a municipality on 3 March 1860 and became a city in 1904.

On 26 May 1872, a Primitive Methodist Church opened in East Street.

By April 1873 there were numerous churches in Ipswich: Anglican, Roman Catholic, Baptist, Primitive Methodist, German Lutheran, and Wesleyan Methodist.

A United Methodist Free Church opened in Brisbane Street in July 1873, having relocated from the "comparative obscurity" of North Ipswich.

In March 1888, 239 allotments of the "Liverpool Estate" were advertised to be auctioned by E. Bostock in conjunction with Arthur Martin & Co. A map advertising the auction shows the proximity of the estate to the railway workshops and the Bremer River.

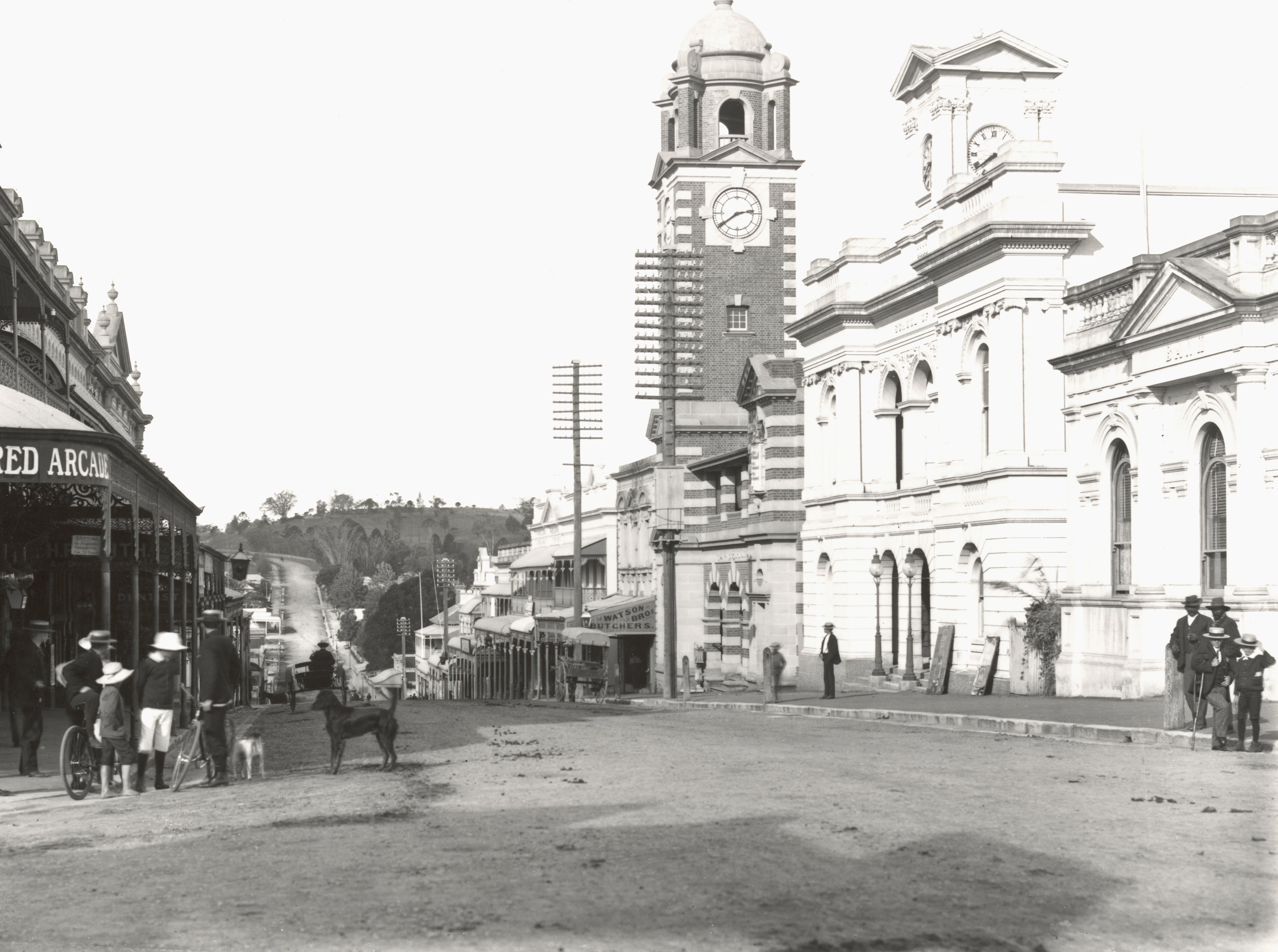
Brisbane Street around the start of the 20th century

In June 1911, 26 building sites of "East Ipswich Station Estate" were advertised to be auctioned by E. Bostock & Sons. A map advertising the auction shows the location of the estate in proximity to the railway line.

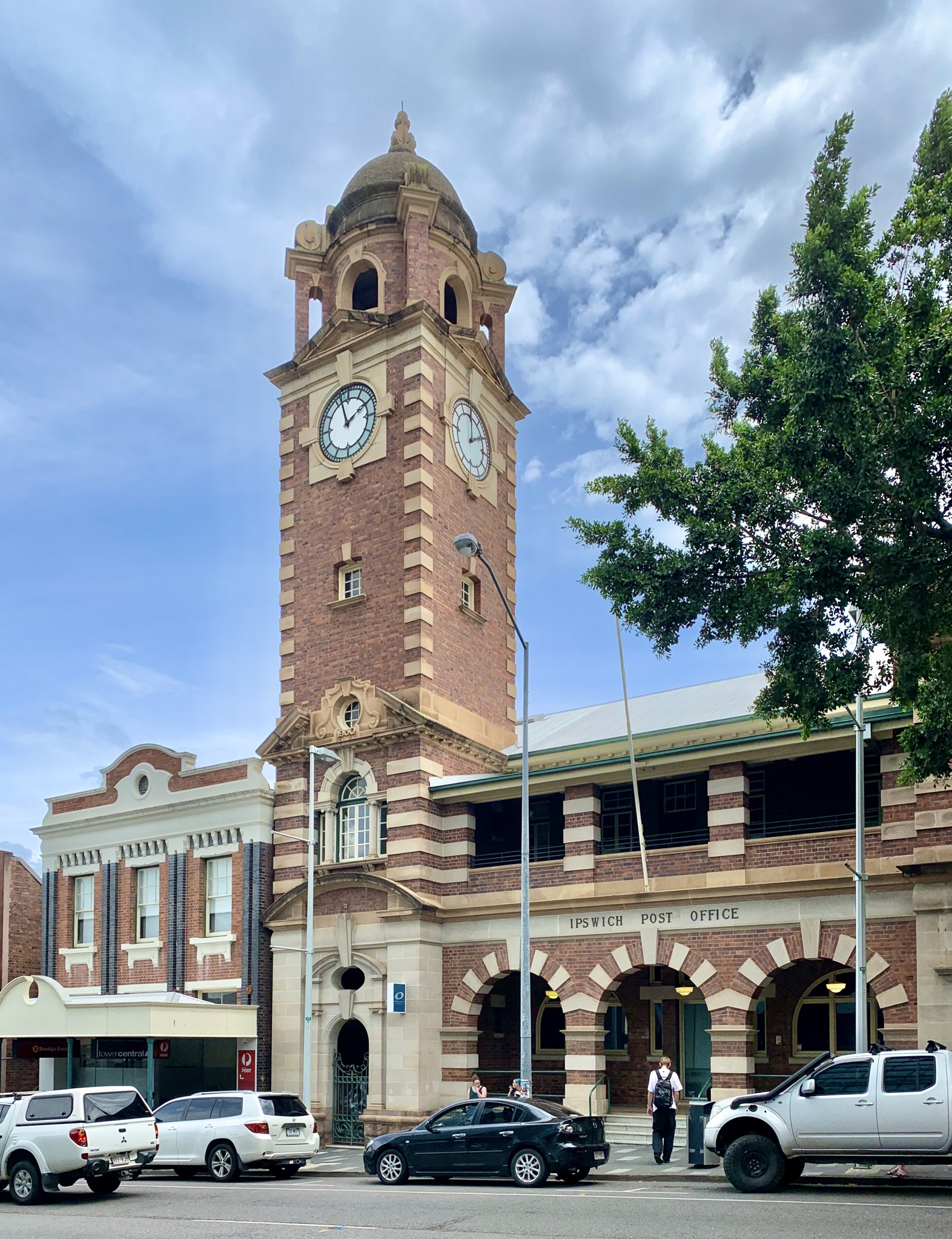
Ipswich Post Office

In 1914, 65 garden allotments were advertised to be auctioned by E. Bostock & Sons. The area was called the "Orangefield Estate". It was formerly an orchard of James Alexander Jackes, and the real estate map advertised that the estate was well stocked with fruit trees. It was reported in the Queensland Times that 20 allotments were sold. This article also listed the buyers. Unsold allotments were advertised in the Queensland Times.

In 1922, 12 allotments were advertised in the Queensland Times to be auctioned by Bacon & Co. Auctioneers in conjunction with H. J. Hargreaves & Co. The area was called the "Whitehill Road Estate". A map advertising the auction shows the estate is across the road from the intersection of Whitehill Road and Griffith Road. Both street names are still in use. By July 1922 the Queensland Times advertised that only six allotments were left.

In October 1925, several allotments in the "Fiveways Estate" at East Ipswich were advertised to be auctioned by Jackson & Meyers in conjunction with Bacon & Co. A map advertising the auction states that the lots were ideal for residential sites, convenient to the East Ipswich Railway Station and water, gas and electric light was available.

In 1928, 211 allotments were advertised to be auctioned by E. Bostock & Sons and W. B. Parkinson. The area was called the "Cribb Estate" and on the estate map it was noted that it was on the eastern slopes of Limestone Hill. The auction was advertised in the Queensland Times and it was also noted in the notes of the Council Meeting published in the Queensland Times that approval had been granted to gravel new roads in the estate before it was sold. It was reported in the Queensland Times that 40 allotments sold on the day of auction and some of the buyers were listed. By the end of 1928 it was reported in the Queensland Times that another 20 allotments had been sold.

In 1930, the Abermain Estate, Tivoli, was advertised to be auctioned by E. Bostock & Sons. The estate map noted that the area comprised the Abermain Colliery containing 1295 acres and farms. It was reported in the Toowoomba Chronicle and Darling Downs Gazette, and The Brisbane Courier, that there was no bid for the coal mine but some farms had sold on the day of auction and some of the buyers were listed. It was also reported later in the Brisbane Courier of further items sold.

=== Royal visits ===
Several members of the British royal family have visited Ipswich.

1868 – Prince Alfred, Duke of Edinburgh

1920 – Prince of Wales (later Edward VIII)

1927 – Duke and Duchess of York (later King George VI and Queen Elizabeth)

1958 – Queen Elizabeth the Queen Mother

1962 – Princess Alice, Countess of Athlone

2011 – Prince William (later Duke of Cambridge)

2014 – Duke and Duchess of Cambridge

=== Floods ===
Damaging floods have occurred on numerous occasions in Ipswich, the largest being the 1893 Brisbane flood peaking at 24.5 metres (80 ft), and more recently during the 1974 Brisbane Flood, (peaking at 20.7 metres (68 ft)) and 2010–11 Queensland floods (peaking at 19.4 metres (64 ft)) on 12 January 2011.

==== 1893 ====
Around 35 people died in the floods in the 1893 Brisbane flood. The Brisbane River burst its banks on three occasions in February of that year and a fourth event several months later. Seven workers were killed at a colliery in north Ipswich as the Bremer River broke its banks.

==== 1974 ====
Fourteen people died in flooding in January 1974, during the Australia Day weekend. Two people were killed in Ipswich. About 1,800 residential and commercial premises in Ipswich were flooded.

==== 2011 ====
The Bremer River at Ipswich reached a height of 19.5 metres (64 ft) on 12 January, inundating the central business district and thousands of houses. 38 people died as a result of the floods. At Minden, on the border of Ipswich City, a four-year-old boy was swept away by floodwaters when he fell from a rescue boat. A man in his fifties died when he accidentally drove into floodwaters in the Ipswich suburb of Wulkuraka.

The worst affected areas of Ipswich were the suburbs of Goodna and Gailes. The flooding allowed bull sharks to reach the centre of Goodna; one was spotted swimming in Williams Street, and a second in Queen Street.

A multibillion-dollar class action lawsuit is underway against dam operators Seqwater, SunWater and the State of Queensland. Law firm Maurice Blackburn have lodged the suit on behalf of 5,500 Ipswich and Brisbane residents who lost their homes or businesses during the floods. Modelling released in 2013 claimed flooding of Ipswich CBD would not have been as extreme if Wivenhoe Dam operators had operated the dam correctly.

== Community facilities and groups ==
The Ipswich Central Library building opened in 1994.

The Ipswich Historical Society was established in 1966 and is located at Cooneana Heritage Centre, 11041 Redbank Plains Rd, New Chum, Ipswich.

The Ipswich branch of the Queensland Country Women's Association meets at 84 Limestone Street (Liberty Hall).

== Climate ==
Ipswich experiences a humid subtropical climate (Köppen: Cfa) with hot, wet summers and mild, dry winters.

Climate data for Ipswich-Amberley Air Base (27º37'48"S, 152º42'36"E, 24 m AMSL) (1991–2020 normals, extremes 1941–2024)
Month	Jan	Feb	Mar	Apr	May	Jun	Jul	Aug	Sep	Oct	Nov	Dec	Year
Record high °C (°F)	44.3 (111.7)	43.0 (109.4)	41.3 (106.3)	36.8 (98.2)	33.3 (91.9)	29.9 (85.8)	29.6 (85.3)	36.5 (97.7)	40.1 (104.2)	41.3 (106.3)	43.0 (109.4)	43.8 (110.8)	44.3 (111.7)
Mean maximum °C (°F)	38.2 (100.8)	37.0 (98.6)	35.0 (95.0)	31.7 (89.1)	28.6 (83.5)	26.3 (79.3)	26.3 (79.3)	29.2 (84.6)	33.1 (91.6)	35.7 (96.3)	36.9 (98.4)	38.0 (100.4)	40.2 (104.4)
Mean daily maximum °C (°F)	31.7 (89.1)	30.9 (87.6)	29.9 (85.8)	27.6 (81.7)	24.6 (76.3)	22.1 (71.8)	22.0 (71.6)	23.8 (74.8)	26.9 (80.4)	28.5 (83.3)	30.1 (86.2)	31.0 (87.8)	27.4 (81.4)
Daily mean °C (°F)	25.7 (78.3)	25.2 (77.4)	23.7 (74.7)	20.5 (68.9)	17.0 (62.6)	14.5 (58.1)	13.6 (56.5)	14.6 (58.3)	18.2 (64.8)	20.8 (69.4)	23.1 (73.6)	24.6 (76.3)	20.1 (68.2)
Mean daily minimum °C (°F)	19.6 (67.3)	19.4 (66.9)	17.5 (63.5)	13.4 (56.1)	9.4 (48.9)	6.8 (44.2)	5.1 (41.2)	5.4 (41.7)	9.4 (48.9)	13.0 (55.4)	16.1 (61.0)	18.2 (64.8)	12.8 (55.0)
Mean minimum °C (°F)	14.5 (58.1)	14.9 (58.8)	12.3 (54.1)	7.3 (45.1)	2.1 (35.8)	−0.8 (30.6)	−1.7 (28.9)	−1.2 (29.8)	3.0 (37.4)	6.3 (43.3)	10.1 (50.2)	12.4 (54.3)	−2.6 (27.3)
Record low °C (°F)	11.6 (52.9)	11.1 (52.0)	6.7 (44.1)	1.0 (33.8)	−3.1 (26.4)	−4.3 (24.3)	−4.8 (23.4)	−4.9 (23.2)	−0.2 (31.6)	2.1 (35.8)	4.9 (40.8)	6.8 (44.2)	−4.9 (23.2)
Average precipitation mm (inches)	108.1 (4.26)	105.0 (4.13)	77.7 (3.06)	37.8 (1.49)	54.0 (2.13)	38.1 (1.50)	23.4 (0.92)	22.9 (0.90)	31.5 (1.24)	62.2 (2.45)	81.8 (3.22)	113.8 (4.48)	750.3 (29.54)
Average precipitation days (≥ 1.0 mm)	7.2	7.5	6.8	4.1	5.2	4.3	3.8	3.1	3.8	6.0	6.5	7.9	66.2
Average afternoon relative humidity (%)	49	53	49	45	45	45	39	34	35	40	45	48	44
Average dew point °C (°F)	17.6 (63.7)	18.0 (64.4)	15.9 (60.6)	12.5 (54.5)	9.7 (49.5)	7.5 (45.5)	5.0 (41.0)	4.0 (39.2)	6.5 (43.7)	10.3 (50.5)	13.5 (56.3)	16.0 (60.8)	11.4 (52.5)
Source: Bureau of Meteorology

== Demographics ==
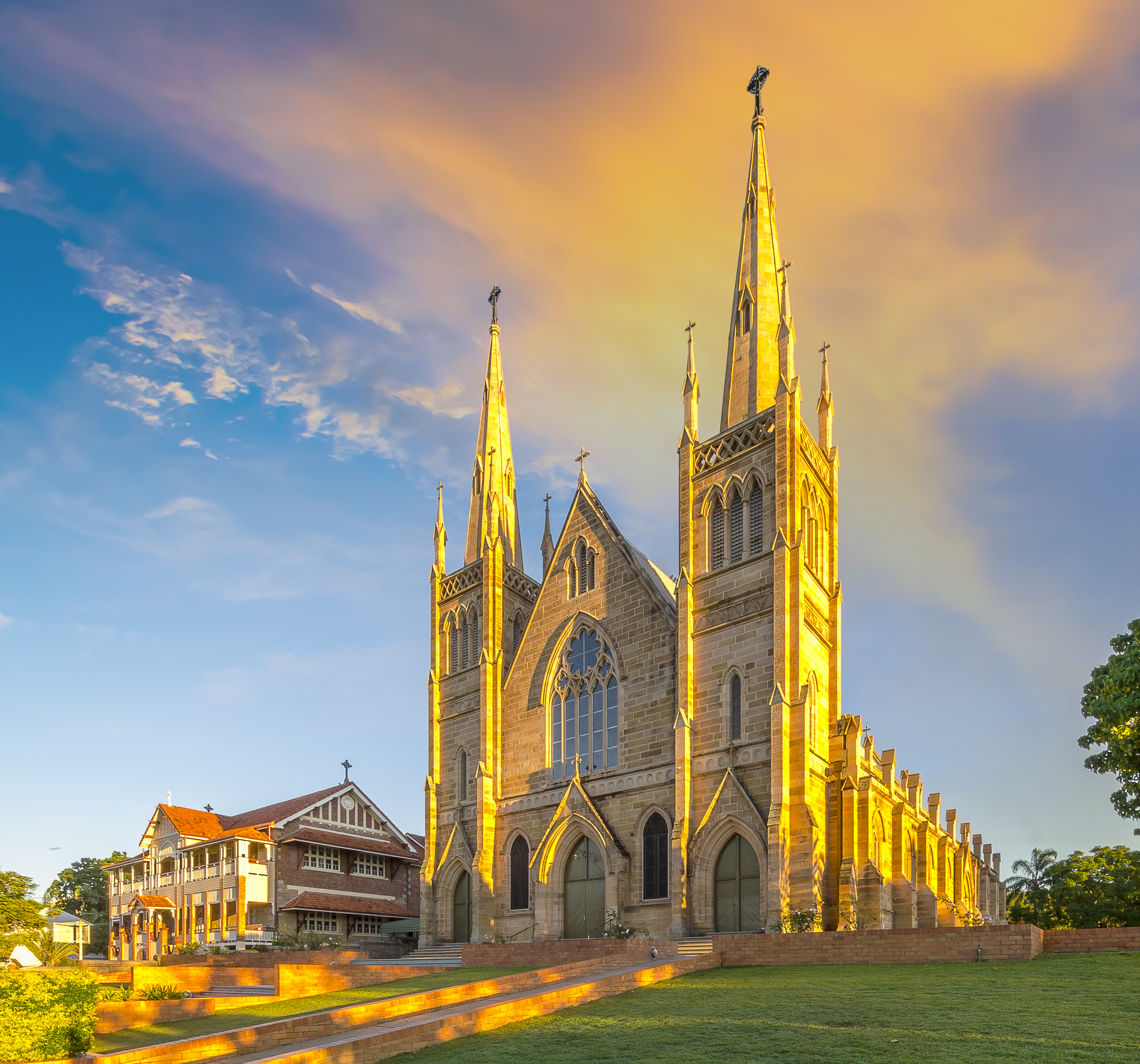
St Mary's Church

In the 2021 census, the population of Inner Ipswich (which encompasses the urban area of Ipswich) was 115,913 people.

== Divisions ==
Ipswich suburbs are divided by 4 Ipswich City Divisional Boundaries:

=== Division 1 ===
Division 1 is the largest of the 4 Divisions, featuring both rural and suburban and rural suburbs.

=== Division 2 ===
Division 2 is largely a suburban Division, spanning the northeast of Ipswich City.

=== Division 3 ===
Division 3 is north-west of Division 2 and northeast of Ipswich, with Brisbane Street and the main Ipswich Train Line running in the centre.

=== Division 4 ===
Division 4 is a rural, and suburban and rural division. Division 4 has large projected growth, including Rosewood and Marburg.

== Economy ==
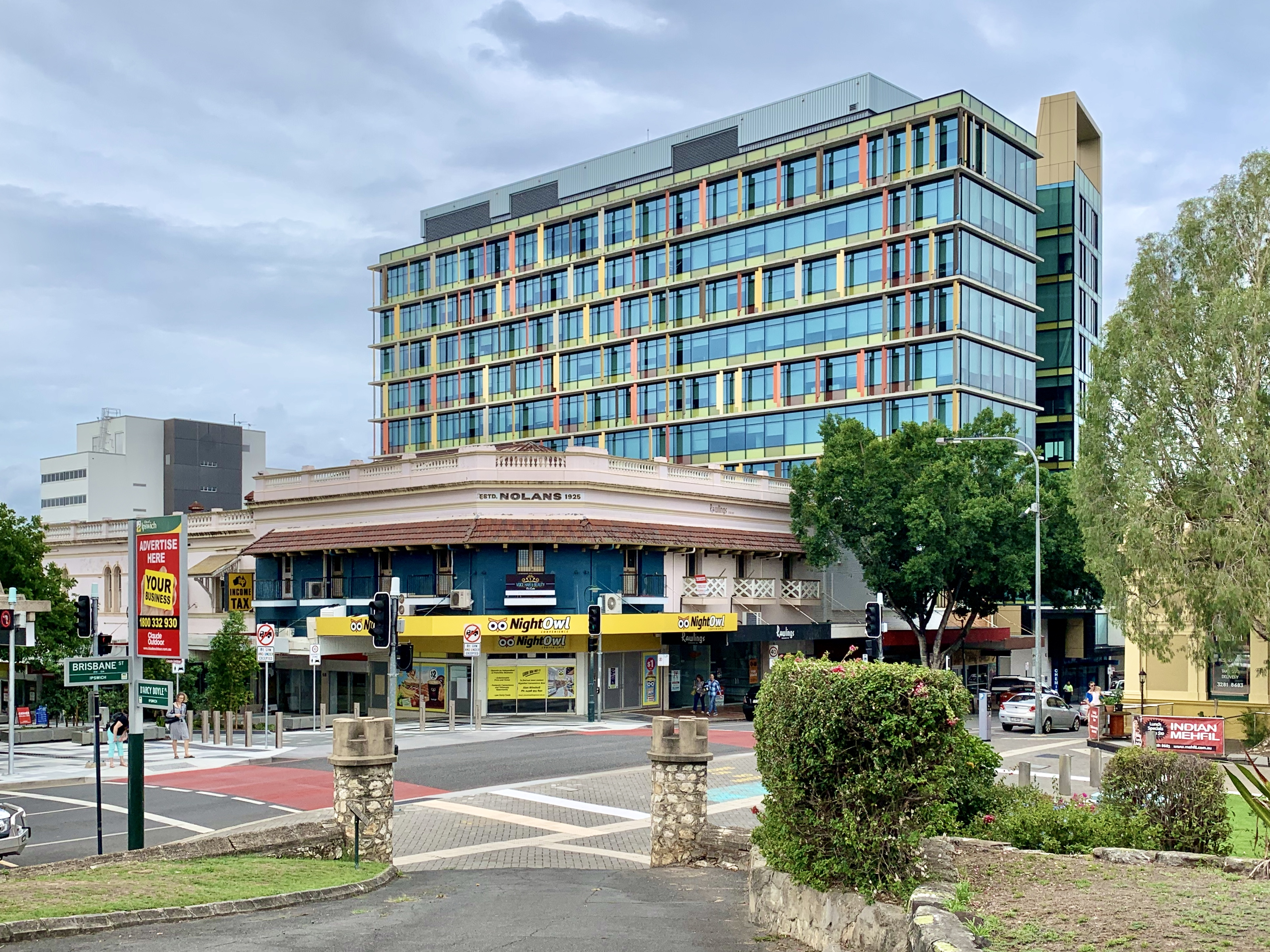
Brisbane Street, in the city centre

Ipswich was a major mining centre, particularly coal mining. The city is the 'cradle of coal mining in Queensland'. Other secondary manufacturing industries included earthenware works, sawmills, abattoirs and foundries, while the region is also rich agriculturally.

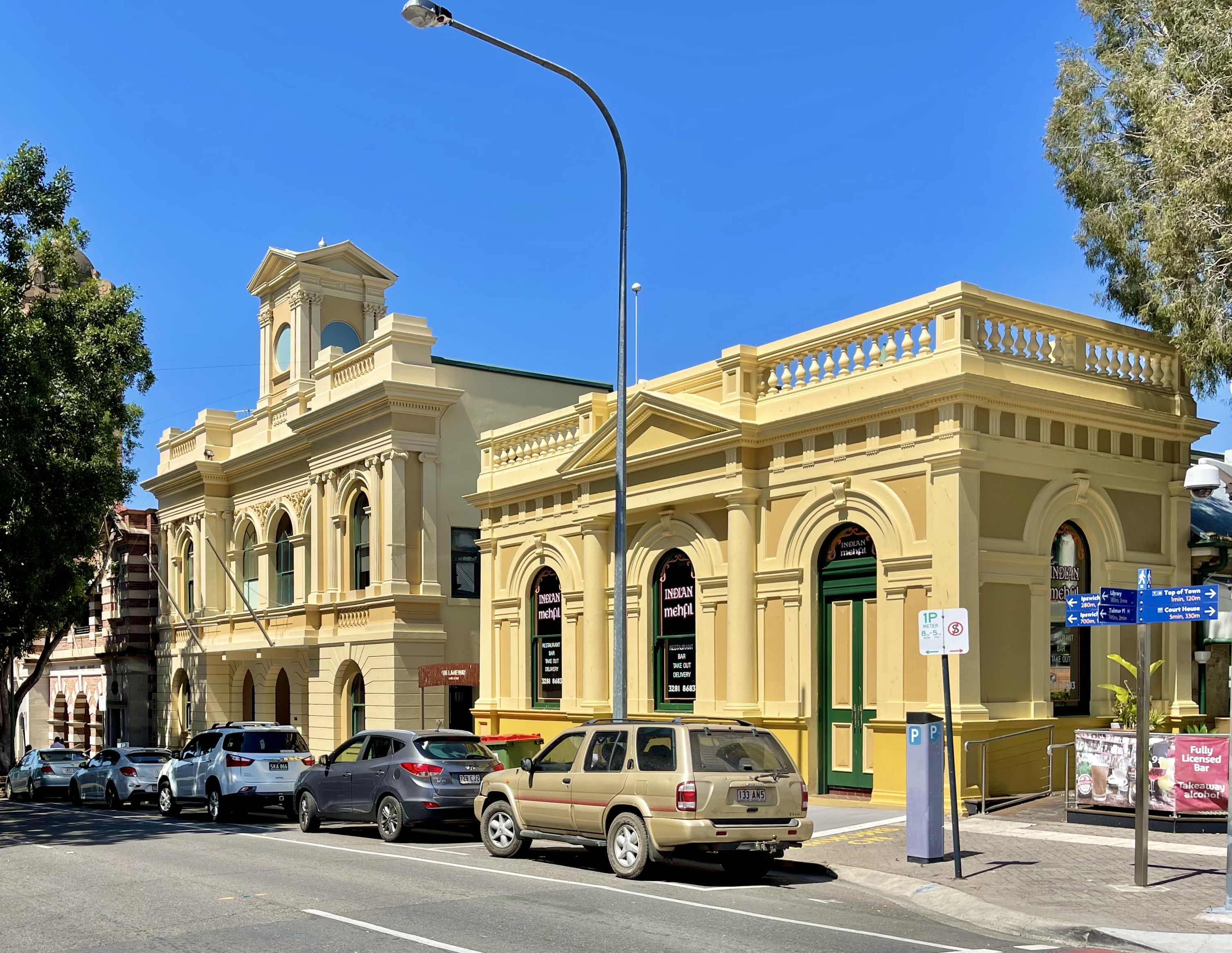
The Old Ipswich Town Hall and former Bank of Australasia building

Ipswich remains a strong manufacturing region, with more than 14% of workers employed in the manufacturing industry, compared to just 7.6% for regional Queensland.

Extensive growth is predicted in Ipswich and the Western Corridor region in years to come, the economy is projected to be worth $12.7 billion by 2026. Global giant General Electric moved its Queensland headquarters into a $72 million building in Springfield in 2015.

Ipswich is the site of RAAF Base Amberley, the Royal Australian Air Force's largest operational base. It is currently home to No. 1 Squadron and No. 6 Squadron (operating the F/A-18F Super Hornet and EA-18G Growler), No. 33 Squadron (operating the Airbus KC-30A) and No. 36 Squadron (operating the Boeing C-17 Globemaster III jet transport). In addition, a number of ground support units are located at Amberley.

=== Film production ===
In recent years, Ipswich has become a sought-after filming location. The 2013 movie The Railway Man was filmed around the city's railyards. Other major films, including San Andreas starring Dwayne Johnson, and Inspector Gadget 2 were filmed around the city. Several Australian films have also used Ipswich for shooting locations, including the 2016 movie Don't Tell and Savages Crossing, The Settlement, The Tree, Mystery Road, 500 Miles and telemovies, Parer's War and Mabo. Australian TV legal drama Rise was also filmed at Borallon Correctional Centre.

== Housing ==
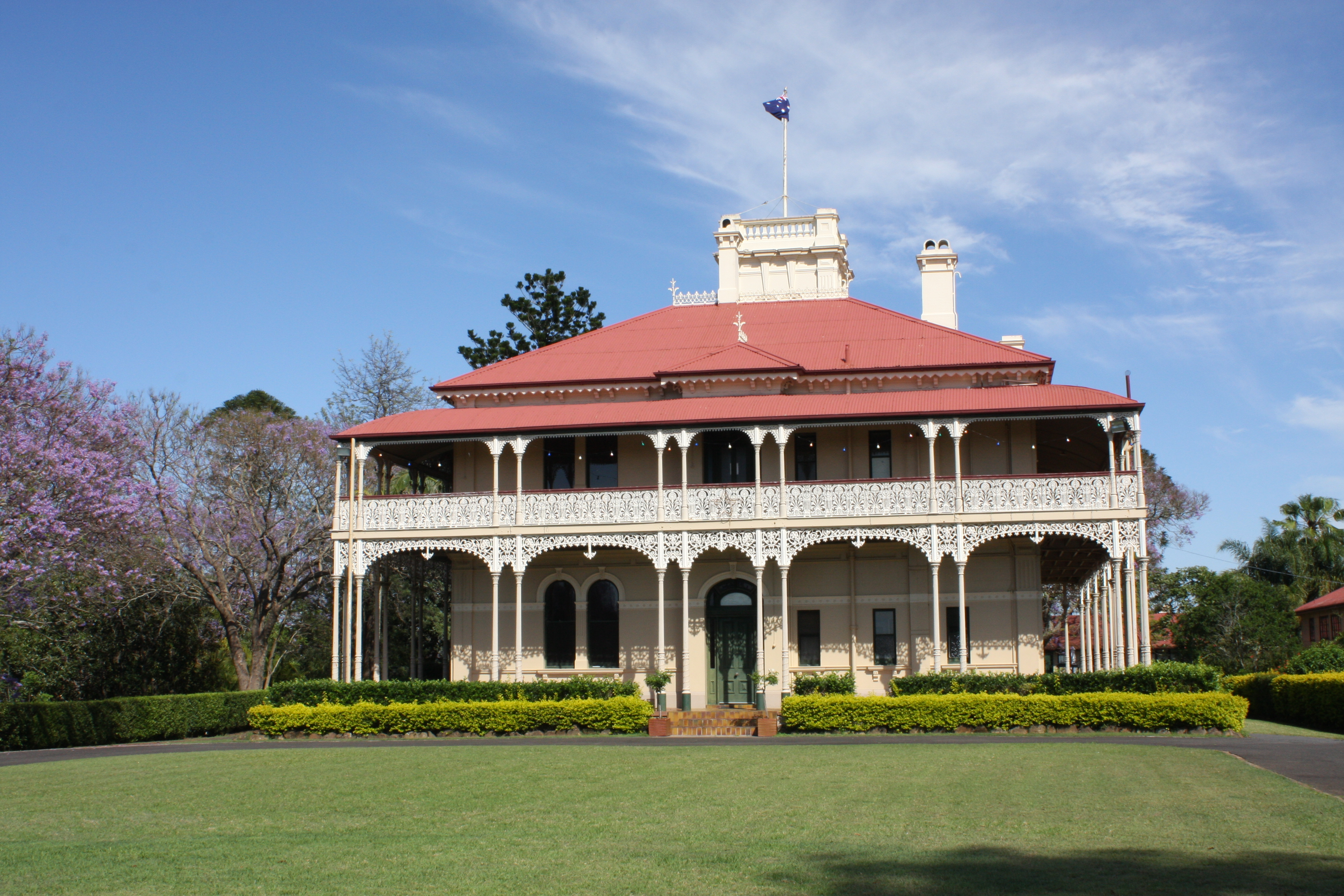
The mansion at the Woodlands of Marburg, Ipswich, 2015

Ipswich is recognised for its important collection of historic buildings. Historic house types range from Early Colonial/Victorian (1850 onwards) to Queensland Bungalow (until 1935), with the city showcasing many markers and plaques outside heritage and historical locations.

The traditional Ipswich dwelling has always been a detached home on land, and is frequently portrayed in the paintings of d'Arcy Doyle, however this is changing as modern housing developments increase. The city is the fastest-growing area in South East Queensland (SEQ).

Two major developments, underway at Springfield and Ripley, will be central to housing this growth. The multibillion-dollar Greater Springfield development was awarded World's Best Master Planned Community 2010 and is designed to grow to an ultimate population of 85,000, with a projection of 105,000 total residents living in the area by 2030. Greater Springfield is positioned as the gateway to the western corridor of the south-east. At 2,860 hectares it is the largest master planned city in Australia.

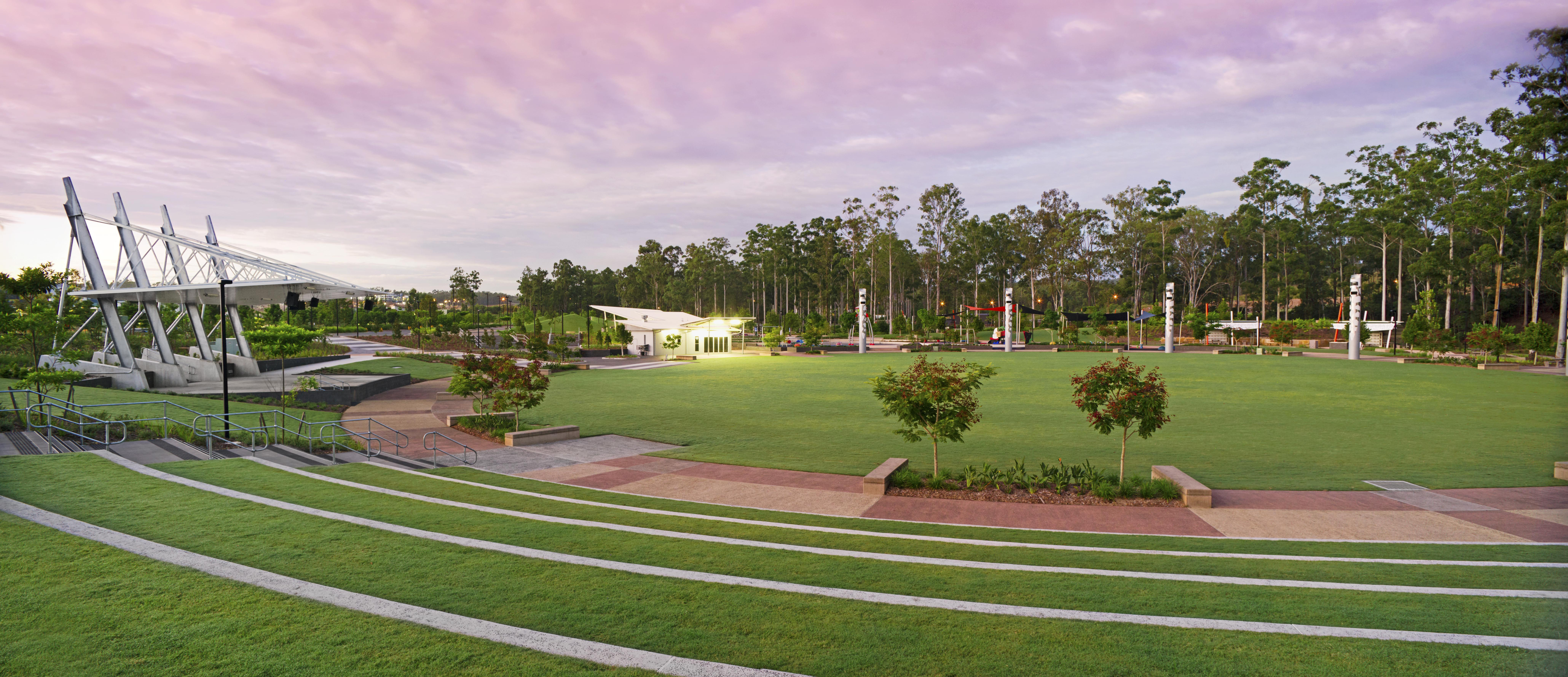
Robelle Domain Springfield Central Parklands

The Ripley Valley Development is master planned to be a model community for a projected population of 120,000 people.

== Infrastructure ==
=== Technology ===
In March 2016, Ipswich's digital innovation and startup hub, Fire Station 101, was officially launched. Owned by Ipswich City Developments and operated by Ipswich City Enterprises, Fire Station 101 will position the region as a leader of the digital economy. More than fifteen members had signed up prior to the opening. In 2015, Ipswich was named in the world's Top 7 most Intelligent Communities by the Intelligent Community Forum (ICF) in New York.

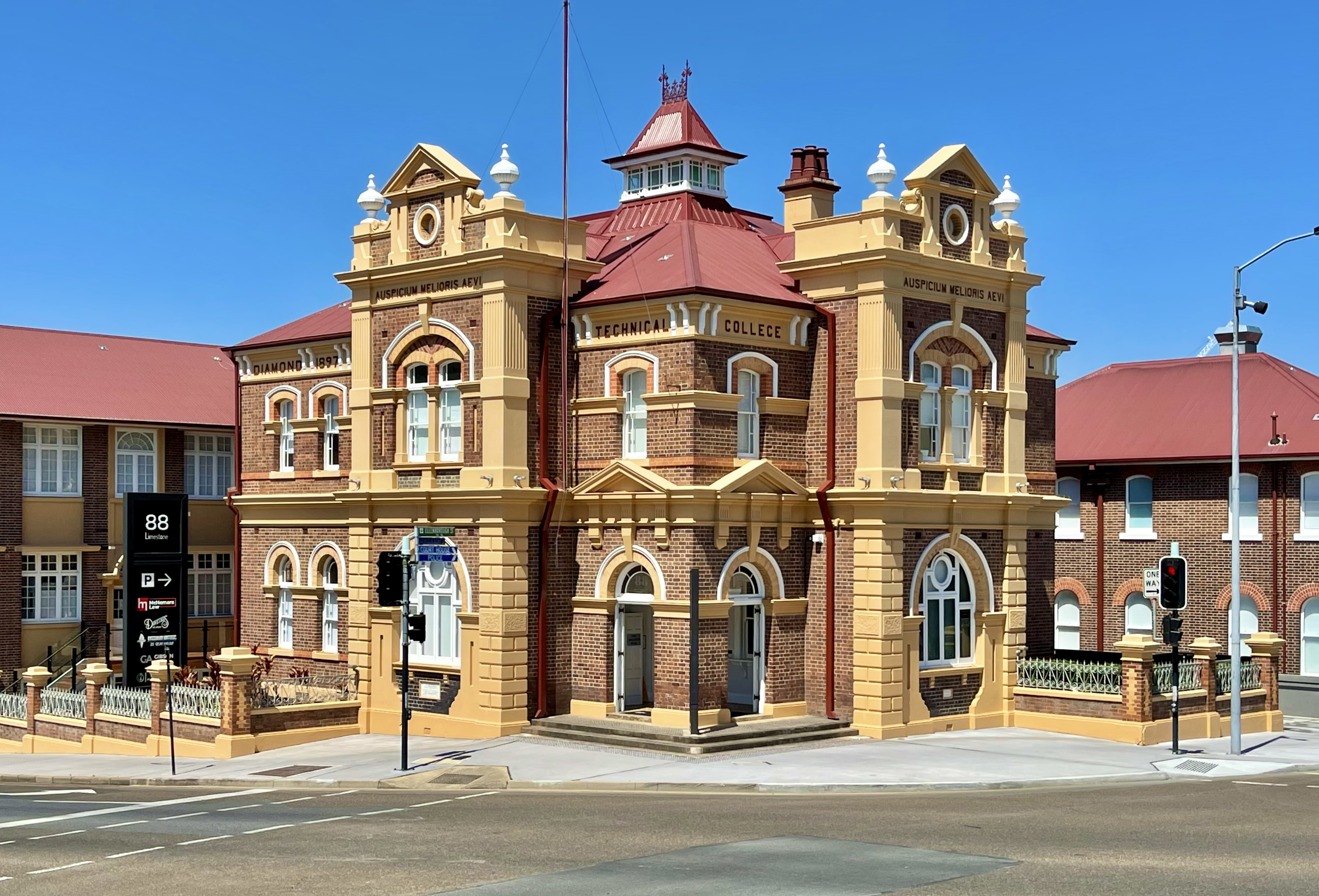
Ipswich Technical College

=== Education ===
Ipswich is home to dozens of primary and secondary schools, including Ipswich Grammar School, which was the first high school in Queensland (established in 1863). Tertiary education facilities include University of Southern Queensland, which has campuses at Springfield and Ipswich. TAFE Queensland South West has a campus at Bundamba and another in Springfield.

=== Safety ===
Ipswich is home to the "Safe City" camera network, which commenced in 1994. More than 200 cameras are monitored all-hours from a facility situated within the CBD.

The Ipswich City Council Safe City Monitoring Facility has hosted representatives of law enforcement agencies from the Netherlands, Taiwan, Great Britain and approximately twenty-five local authorities from across Australia to inspect the closed-circuit television (CCTV) camera monitoring system.

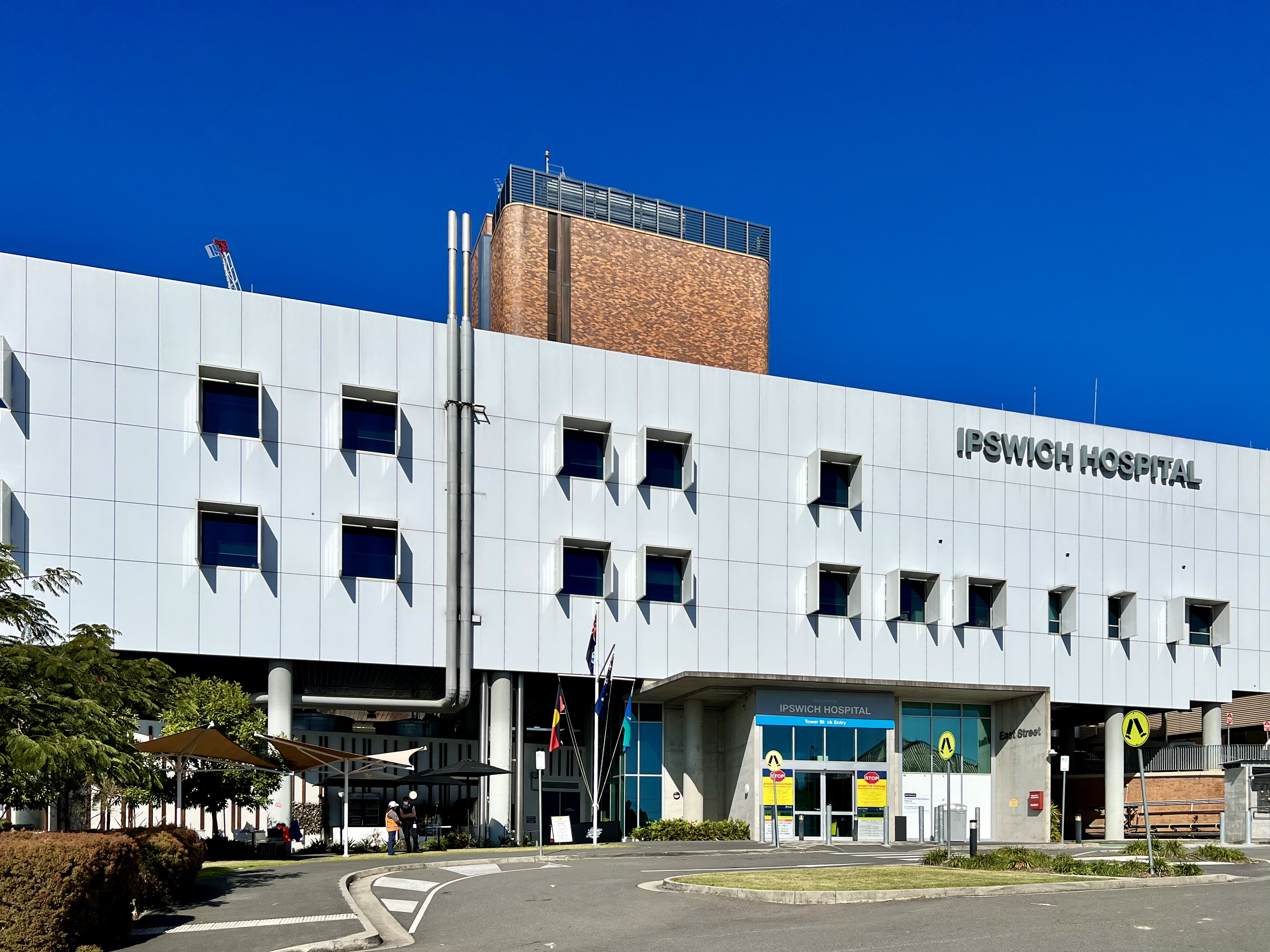
Ipswich Hospital

=== Health ===
Ipswich Hospital is the major public hospital. St Andrew's Private Hospital and Mater Private Hospital Springfield are local private hospitals.

=== Transport ===
Ipswich has direct access to the Ipswich Motorway (linking to Brisbane); the Cunningham Highway (linking to Warwick); the Warrego Highway (linking to Toowoomba); the Logan Motorway and its connection to the Pacific Motorway (linking to Logan and the Gold Coast); and the Centenary Highway (linking Springfield and the Ripley Valley to Brisbane).

Ipswich railway station is a major hub for rail transport. The electrified rail line that extends east from Ipswich through Brisbane's western suburbs to the Brisbane CBD is known as the Ipswich Line. The Rosewood railway line, part of the first railway in Queensland, is also electrified and extends west through Ipswich's western suburbs to the town of Rosewood. Both lines are operated by Queensland Rail.

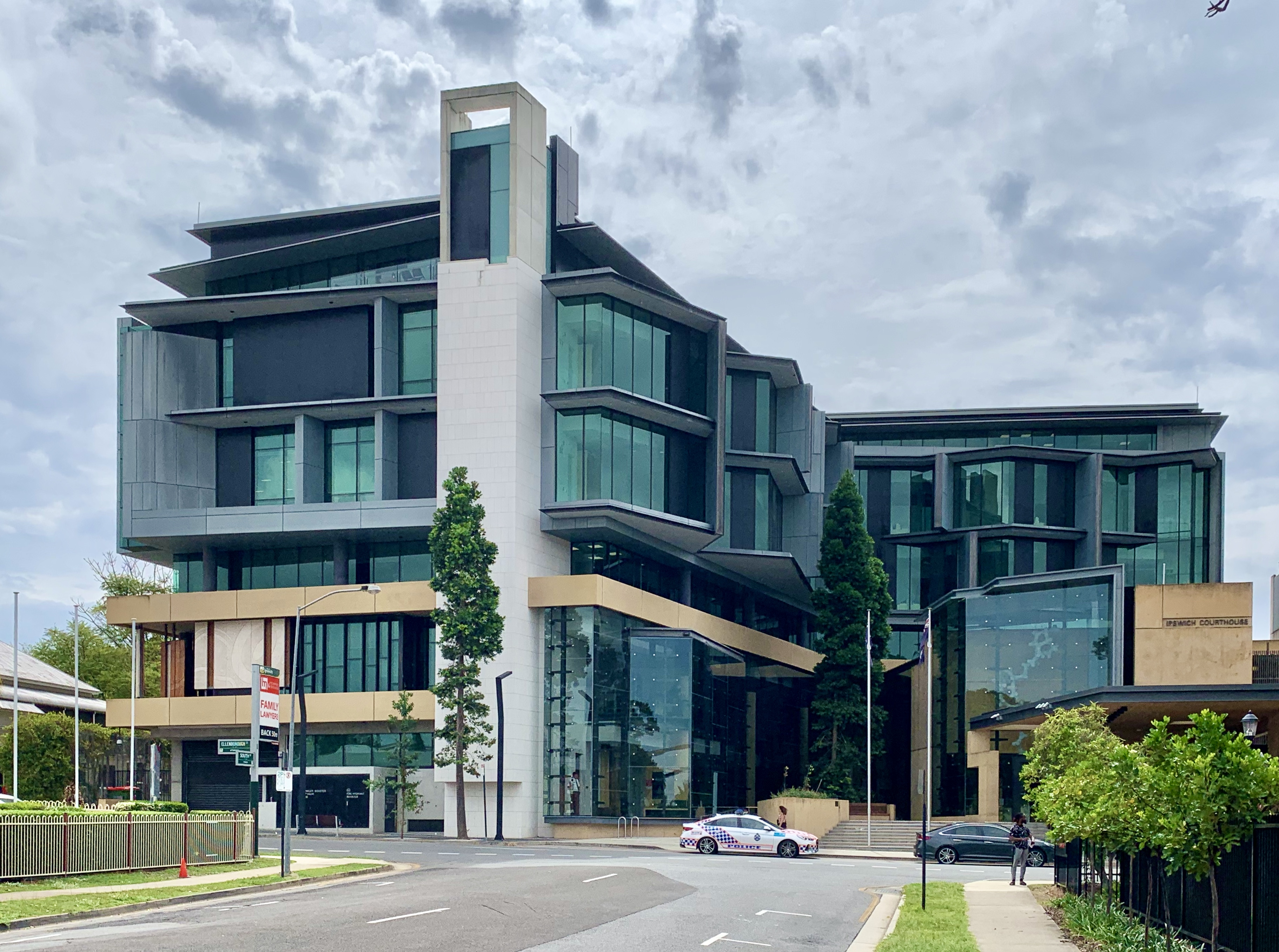
Ipswich Courthouse

=== Facilities ===
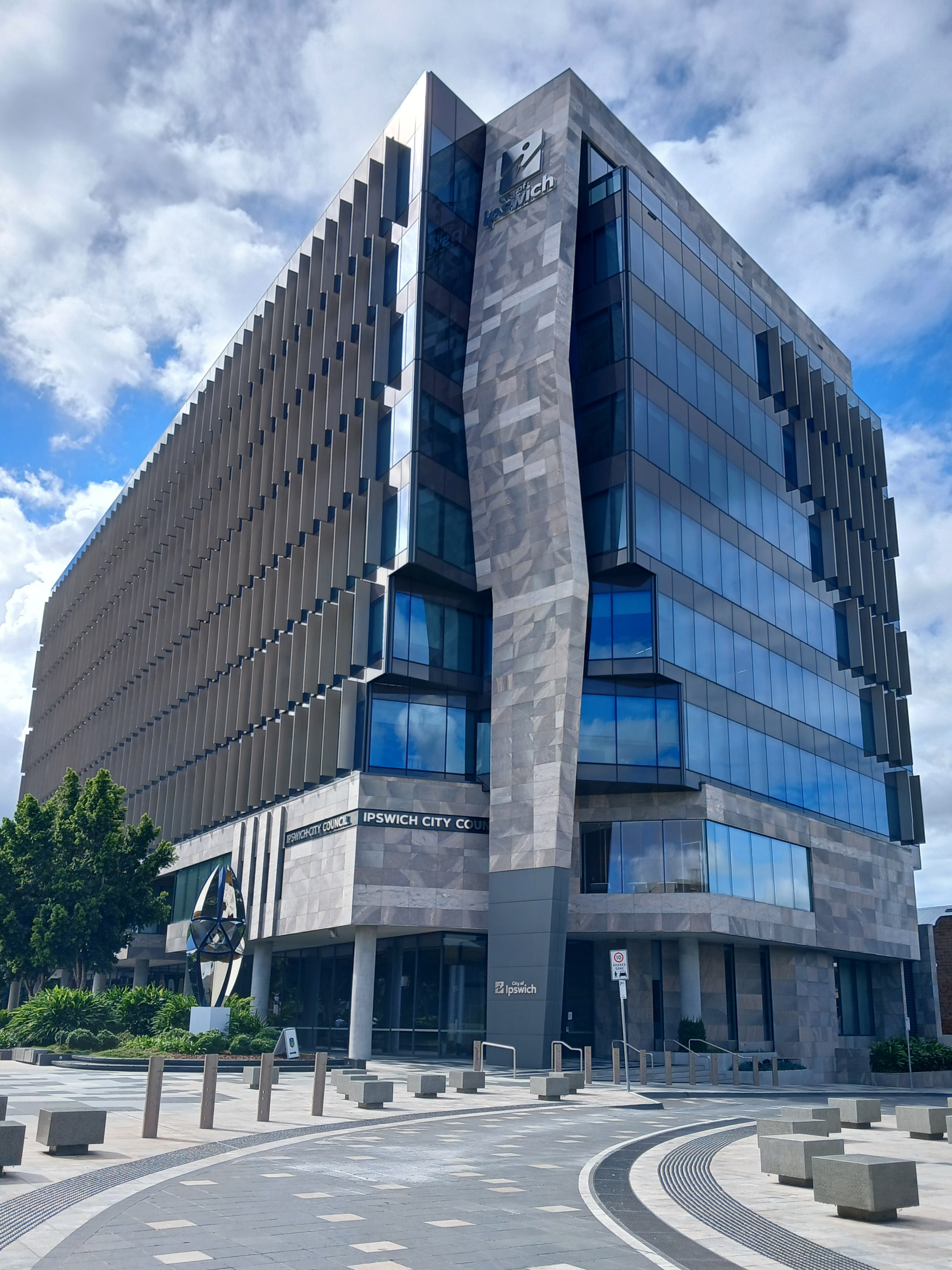
Ipswich City Council Building

Ipswich has more than 500 parks and conservation estates, including Nerima Gardens, which was designed in consultation with Ipswich's Japanese sister city, Nerima. In 2015, Orion Lagoon opened in Springfield Central.

Brookwater hosts the Brookwater Golf and Country Club. The par 72 golf course, designed by Greg Norman, measures 6,505 metres and has been voted as Queensland's number one golf course in Golf Australia magazine's best 50 courses.

The Ipswich Council operates a public library and a separate children's library in the $250 million Nicolas Street Precinct 2017 upgrade located in the heart of the Ipswich CBD.

== Sport ==
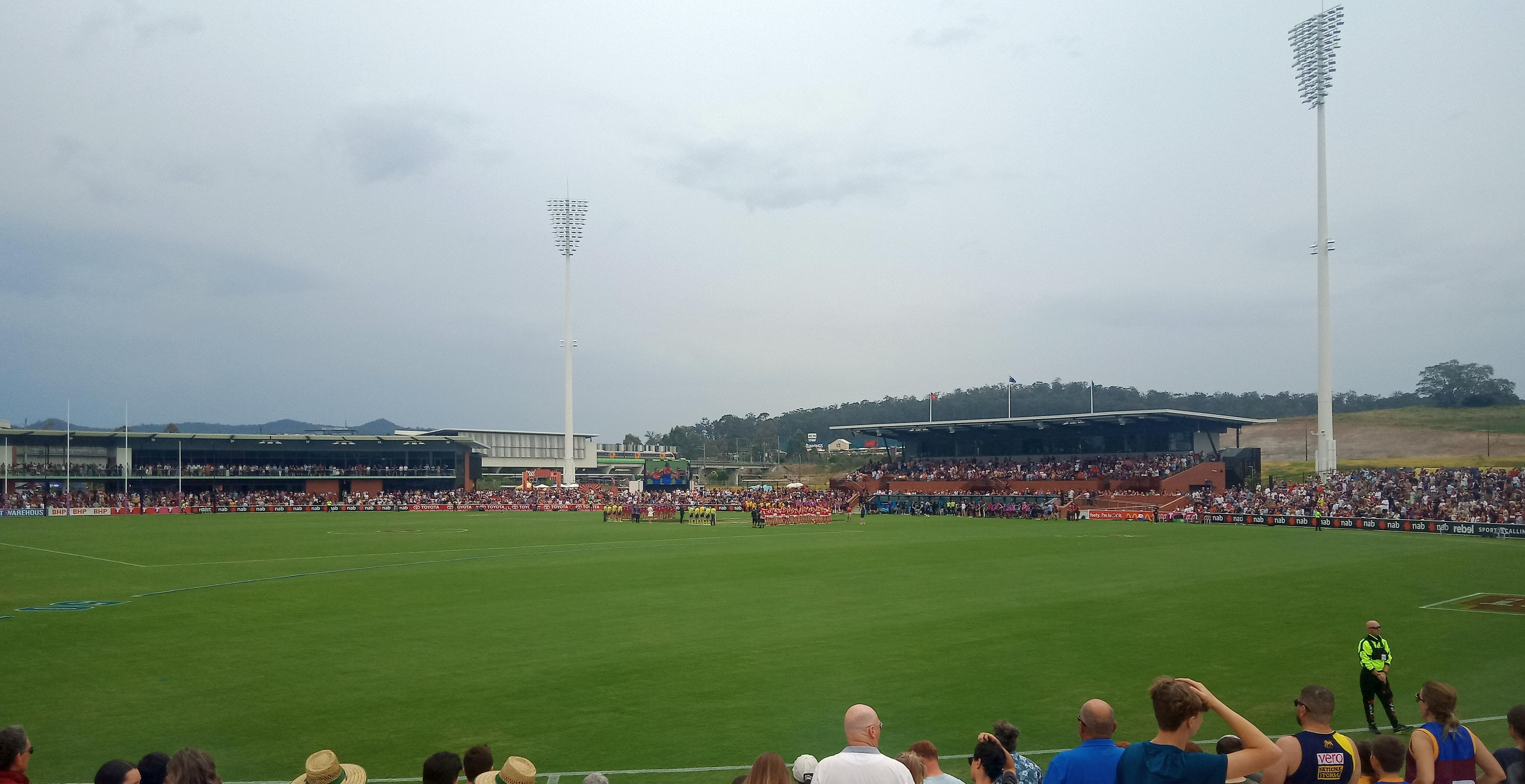
Springfield Central Stadium hosting the AFL Women's season seven Grand Final.

Ipswich has had a number of sporting successes at a state and national level. In 2022 the Brisbane Lions, one of just two Queensland clubs playing in the national Australian Football League (AFL) competition moved its headquarters to its new purpose-built Springfield Central Stadium, the stadium is now the home ground for the club's women's side playing in the AFLW, which played its first match in the a sell out AFLW Grand Final, the highest level of women's competition. In 2015, the local rugby league club, Ipswich Jets, won their maiden Intrust Super Cup title and took the NRL State Championship. The win fuelled interest in a Western Corridor NRL bid.

- Association football: Western Pride play in the statewide National Premier League (NPL), while historic club Ipswich Knights play in the Brisbane Premier League. Other teams playing in Ipswich include the Ipswich City Bulls, Springfield United, Western Spirit, Whitehill, Westminster, Raceview, Silkstone and Rosewood.
- Australian rules football: Springfield Central Stadium is the headquarters of the Brisbane Lions (AFL). In AFL Queensland competitions the Ipswich Eagles play in Division 2, Collingwood Park Power play in Division 3 while the Ipswich Cats and the Greater Springfield Storm play in Division 4.
- Basketball: The Ipswich Force play in the Queensland Basketball League, fielding teams in the men's competition and women's competition. They play their home games at Cotton On Foundation Stadium in Bundamba.
- Cricket: The Ipswich Logan Hornets play in the Brisbane Grade Cricket competition, fielding teams in 1st, 2nd and 3rd grades. They have their home ground at the Ivor Marsden Complex in Amberley.
- Golf: The Ipswich City Golf Club play in Leichhardt, Queensland.
- Greyhound racing: The Ipswich Showgrounds host greyhound racing, organised by the Ipswich Greyhound Racing Club the track opened in 1973.
- Gridiron: The Ipswich Cougars play in the Gridiron Queensland league.
- Hockey: is played at Briggs Rd Sporting Complex facility where there are two artificial surfaces.
- Motorsport: Drag racing is conducted at Willowbank Raceway throughout the year with events open to both professional and amateur racers.
- Motorsport: V8 Supercars race each year in the SuperSprint at Queensland Raceway at Willowbank in July.
- Motorsport: motorcycle speedway takes place at the Willowbank Speedway track (27°41′34″S 152°39′48″E) and hosted the 2019 Australian U-21 Championship. The Showgrounds held speedway from 1950 to 1972.
- Rugby league: The Ipswich Jets play in the Queensland Cup competition, FOGS and FOGS Colts. Ipswich Diggers are the junior representative teams playing all other QLD regions in the Mal Meninga (under 18s) and the Cyril Connell (under 16s) statewide Cups. Ipswich also has a local league competition, Ipswich Rugby League, which include four grades of Seniors and every age group of juniors (multiple divisions).
- Rugby union: The Ipswich Rangers play in the Queensland Suburban Rugby Union competition usually competing with 3–4 grades including Colts. The Rangers juniors compete in the Brisbane Junior Rugby competition. A number of players have also been recruited by the Western Districts club.
- Softball: Ipswich Softball Association located in the suburb of one mile has softball teams ranging from Tee Ball through to A Grade Mens and Women.

== Events ==
=== Ipswich Show ===
The first Ipswich Annual Show was held on 2 April 1873 by the Queensland Pastoral and Agricultural Society. There had been shows staged by the Ipswich and West Moreton Horticultural and Agricultural Society as early as 1868. Originally held at the sale yards situated at Lobb St, Churchill, the show moved to its present home at the Ipswich Showgrounds in 1877.

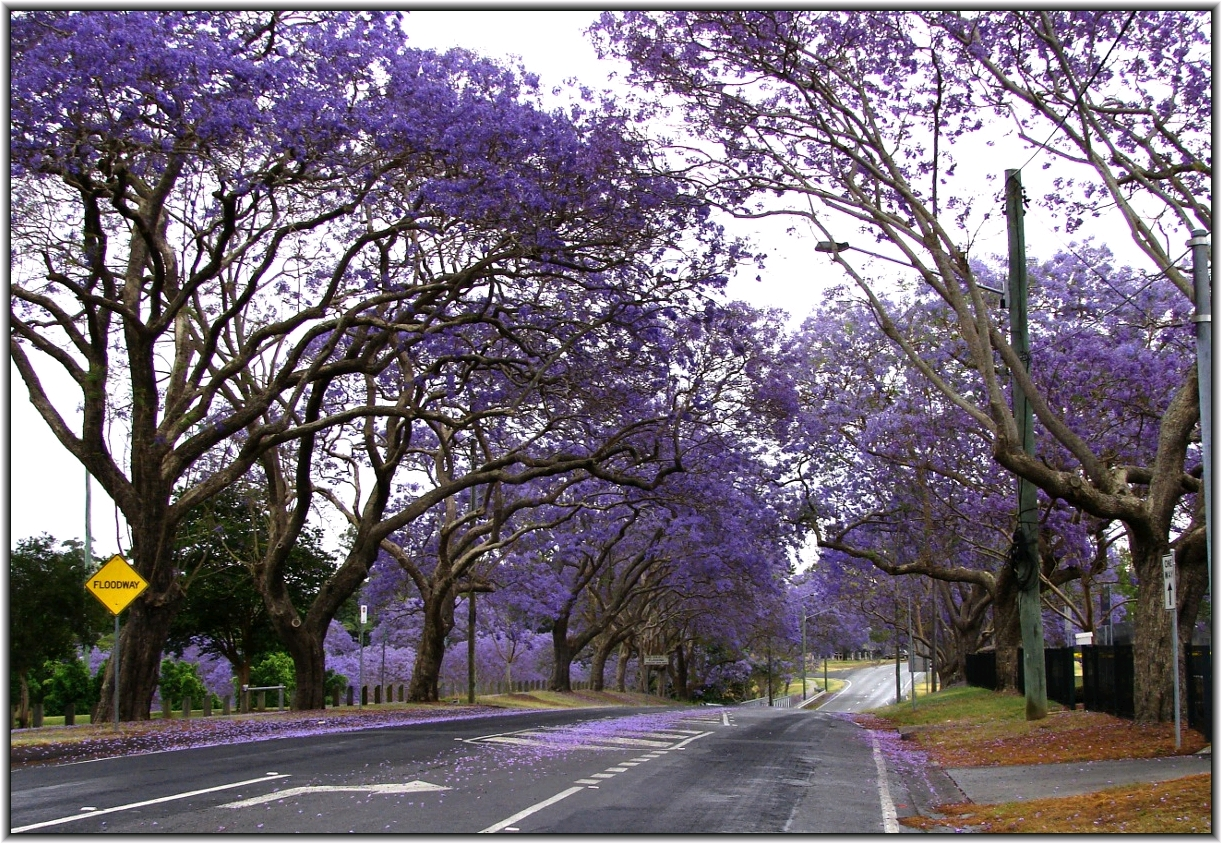
Ipswich Jacaranda Trees at Goodna

=== Goodna Jacaranda Festival ===
This festival has been held annually at Goodna (Evan Marginson Sportsground) since 1968.

=== Ipswich Festival ===
The Ipswich Festival is an annual multi-disciplinary festival. First staged in 1998, the program for the Ipswich Festival includes live bands, concerts, art exhibits, fireworks, theatre, jazz, multicultural celebrations, interactive displays and a range of family-based events to encourage participation by all age groups whilst attracting day tourism to the region.

The Ipswich Festival runs for two weeks at the end of April and beginning of May with the majority of events free.

=== Winternationals ===
The Fuchs Winternationals is an annual event, typically held around June at Willowbank Raceway, part of the Ipswich Motorsport Precinct. The four-day event is one of the largest drag racing festivals in the southern hemisphere and has drawn crowds of more than 40,000 people in previous years.

== Notable people ==
=== Sportspeople ===
- Deborah Acason, represented Australia in weightlifting, Commonwealth Games (2006 Gold Medal, 2002 Silver Medal) and Olympics (2008 eighth place, 2004 twelfth place) Greg Ball, Paralympic cyclist
- Berrick Barnes, dual code rugby footballer and Wallabies player, attended Ipswich Grammar School
- Ashleigh Barty, professional tennis player and cricketer, as of 9 January 2022 WTA world no. 1, attended Woodcrest State College
- Dud Beattie, Australian rugby league representative, Queensland and national selector
- John Buchanan, former Australian cricket team coach
- Dakota Davidson, AFL Women's player attended Ipswich Girls' Grammar School
- Allan Davis, professional road racing cyclist for UCI ProTour team Orica–GreenEDGE, winner of the 2009 Tour Down Under
- Bryony Duus, Australia women's national soccer team midfielder at the 2000 Summer Olympics and 2003 FIFA Women's World Cup
- Israel Folau, professional triple code footballer Australian rugby league, rugby union representative and professional Australian rules football (AFL) player. Played for Ipswich junior rugby league team Goodna Eagles.
- Harley Fox, rugby union player attended St Edmund's College
- Alex Gibb, first captain of the Australia national soccer team
- Gout Gout, sprinter and record holder of the Australian 200m race (20.04s), born in Ipswich
- Matthew Hodgson, professional basketball player, Australian men's national basketball team representative.
- Rhan Hooper, professional Australian rules (AFL) footballer, attended Bundamba State Secondary College
- Luke Keary, NRL player for Sydney Roosters, grew up in the suburb of Raceview, attended St Mary's Primary School, played for Brothers Ipswich JRLFC
- Noel Kelly, rugby league, played for Goodna, Railways, Brothers Ipswich, Western Suburbs Magpies, Queensland and Australian Kangaroos (1959–60; 1963–64 and 1967–68). Hooker in Queensland Rugby League's Team of the Century, attended St Edmund's College
- Belinda Kitching, Australia women's national soccer team goalkeeper at the 1999 FIFA Women's World Cup.
- Allan Langer, rugby league player, attended Blair State Primary School and Ipswich State High School
- Jim Lenihan, rugby league player and coach
- Kate Lutkins, AFL Women's player attended West Moreton Anglican College and Ipswich Girls' Grammar School.
- Ezra Mam, rugby league player
- Craig McDermott, represented Queensland and Australia in cricket, attended Ipswich Grammar School
- McLean Family, national rugby league and rugby union representatives, attended St Edmund's College
- Rosemary Milgate, represented Australia swimming at the 1976 Olympics whilst still attending Bremer State High School
- Des Morris, rugby league, Queensland rep and Australian selector, attended Bremer State High School
- Rod Morris, rugby league, former Balmain, Queensland, NSW and Australian front row forward
- Joe Quinn, professional baseball player and manager
- Michelle Sawyers, Queensland and Australian soccer player, named in the International Team of the Decade 1979–1989
- Lagi Setu, NRL player for the Brisbane Broncos, attended Ipswich Grammar School
- Dale Shearer, rugby league, represented Queensland and Australia
- Grant Sorensen, volleyball player, attended St Edmund's College
- Lama Tasi, NRL Player for the Sydney Roosters, attended Ipswich Grammar School
- Mark Tonelli, Olympic gold medallist in swimming, member of the Quietly Confident Quartet
- Ashley Walsh, national karting champion, V8 Supercars driver
- The "Walters Brothers", rugby league players: Kevin Walters, Kerrod Walters and Steve Walters
- Shane Watson, represented Queensland and Australia in cricket, attended Ipswich Grammar School

=== Entertainment, media and the arts ===
- Tony Barry, actor
- John Birmingham, (Liverpool-born) author, attended St Edmund's College
- Harold Blair, Aboriginal tenor and music teacher
- John Bradfield, engineer and designer of the Sydney Harbour Bridge; Story Bridge; and the Sydney Railway System
- Joy Chambers, author, actor
- Trent Dalton, writer
- D'Arcy Doyle, painter, attended St Edmund's College
- Bessie Gibson, artist
- Hazza, television presenter and singer, attended West Moreton Anglican College
- Matthew Hickey, barrister and founder of The Ten Tenors, attended St Edmund's College
- Luke Kennedy, singer, finalist The Voice Australia
- David McCormack, former lead member of Custard and The Titanics, attended Ipswich Grammar School
- George Miller Hollywood director, screenwriter and producer, attended Ipswich Grammar School
- Pacharo Mzembe, actor
- Thomas Shapcott, author and poet
- Charles Trussell, brass band composer

=== Politics and the law ===
- Neville Bonner AO, the first Indigenous Australian to sit in the Australian Parliament. He was elected in his own right in 1972, 1974, 1975 and 1980.
- Clare Foley, lawyer
- Josiah Francis, politician, attended St Edmund's College
- Sir Harry Gibbs, Chief Justice of the High Court of Australia
- Sir Samuel Griffith, Chief Justice of the High Court of Australia
- Pauline Hanson, politician, founder and leader of One Nation, a right-wing populist political party, elected in Oxley from 1996 to 1998, later as senator from 2016 to now
- Jim Madden, politician, attended St Edmund's College
- Patricia Petersen, politician, director, producer, author, playwright, media personality

=== Other ===
- Sidney Cotton, inventor and rumoured inspiration for character of James Bond (literary character)
- Nick Politis, businessman, Chairman of the Sydney Roosters, attended Ipswich Grammar School
- George Roberts, aviation pioneer
- Clinton Haines, computer hacker, attended Ipswich Grammar School

== See also ==
- Ipswich General Cemetery
- Ipswich Grammar School
- Pauline Hanson's One Nation
- Brisbane Broncos
