= Ipswich Rangers Rugby Club =

Australian rugby union club, based in Ipswich, QLD

Ipswich Rangers
- Full name: Ipswich Rugby Union Football Club
- Union: Queensland Rugby Union
- Branch: Queensland Suburban Rugby Union
- Founded: 1886 (Re-established 1968)
- Region: Ipswich, Queensland
- League: QSRU Division I
- 2012: Premiers
Team kit

Official website
- www.rangersrugby.com.au

The Ipswich Rangers, is a rugby union football club located in Ipswich, Queensland, Australia. The club currently competes in the top division of the Queensland Suburban competition for the Barber and Pegg Cups, and previously played in the Brisbane Premiership now known as Queensland Premier Rugby. The Ipswich Rangers play their home matches at Woodend Park, and the team wears a green and white strip.

== History ==
The original Ipswich Rangers Rugby Club was formed in July 1886, and played a Combined Brisbane team a month later. In 1887 the Rangers won the Hardgrave Challenge Cup for the premiership of the Colony of Queensland, defeating the Wanderers club of Brisbane in the deciding match by 5 points to 2. The Ipswich Rangers also played the first touring British rugby team in 1888. But by 1891 the club was not able to regularly field a team and began to forfeit matches. Other rugby sides were then formed in Ipswich, including the Athenian Club, Bells Football Club, Raceview, and the City Football Club.

The present Ipswich Rangers Rugby Club was formed in 1968. Ipswich won their first senior trophy in 1974, defeating Surfers Paradise by 38-4 to win the Sunday Truth Shield for the Queensland Sub-districts A-grade competition. In 1979 the club was promoted to the Brisbane Premiership and the A-grade team defeated the reigning premiers University of Queensland by 21-19 at Woodend Park, but that was the team's only win of the season.

The Ipswich first team played through the 1987 season undefeated to win the Sub-districts A-grade competition and in the following two seasons went on to claim three titles in a row.

In the restyled Queensland Suburban Rugby Union competition, Ipswich Rangers won the Barber Cup in 2005, 2006 and 2010. The club won the title again in 2012, defeating Wynnum Bugs by 33-26 in the grand final at Ballymore.

== International players ==
Former Australian international player, and ARU president, Paul McLean played for the Ipswich Rangers in the early 1970s.

New Zealander Mak Fatialofa, a former Junior All Blacks representative, played for Ipswich in 1987.

== Honours ==
Queensland Premiership (Northern Rugby Union)

- Hardgrave Cup: 1887

Queensland Sub-districts Rugby Union

- A-grade Premiers (Sunday Truth Shield): 1974, 1982, 1984, 1987, 1988, 1989, 1992

Queensland Suburban Rugby Union - First Division

- First grade Premiers (Barber Cup): 2005, 2006, 2010, 2012
