= Caloundra RSL Cup =

Caloundra RSL Cup may refer to sporting competitions on Australias Sunshine Coast:

- Caloundra RSL Cup (cricket)
- Caloundra RSL Cup (rugby league); see Jordan Meads
