= Michelle Sawyers =

Australian football player

Personal information
- Date of birth: 25 October 1960 (age 66)
- Place of birth: Butterworth RAAF Base, Penang, Malaysia
- Position: Defender

Youth career
- 1973: Coalstars SC

Senior career*
Years	Team	Apps	(Gls)
- Coalstars

International career
1987–1991	Australia	13	
- * Club domestic league appearances and goals

Michelle Sawyers (born 25 October 1960) is a former defender from Australia who made 13 appearances for the Australia women's national soccer team.

== Playing career ==
In 1973 Sawyers was living in Ipswich, Queensland and started playing for Coalstars SC, at age 13. She stayed at Coalstars for her entire senior club career, which lasted until 1992.

Sawyers was selected in the FFA International Team of the Decade for 1979–89. She made 13 appearances for the Female Socceroos from December 1987 to 1991.
