= 2014 Sunshine Coast Rugby Union season =

- Countries: Australia
- Matches played: 30 (A-Grade)

The 2014 Sunshine Coast Rugby Union season will be the 33rd season of the rugby union competition on Australia's Sunshine Coast.

The season opened on April 26 with Maroochydore losing to Noosa 55-10 at Cotton Tree Oval in Maroochydore and University defeating Caloundra 38-9 at the University Oval, Sippy Downs. The season is scheduled to conclude on 27 September with the SCRU Grand Final.

Round 4: University 64-0 Maroochydore

Round 5: Noosa vs University

== Round 1 ==
Home team	Home team score	Away team	Away team score	Venue	Reference	Date
Maroochydore	10	Noosa	55	Cotton Tree Oval, Maroochydore		26 April 2014
University	38	Caloundra	9	University of the Sunshine Coast, Sippy Downs		26 April 2014
Toads		bye				

== Round 2 ==
Home team	Home team score	Away team	Away team score	Venue	Reference	Date
Toads	20	University	27	Victory Park, Woombye		3 May 2014
Caloundra	22	Maroochydore	43	Arther St, Caloundra		3 May 2014
Noosa		bye				

== Round 3 ==
Home team	Home team score	Away team	Away team score	Venue	Reference	Date
Noosa	26	Caloundra	11	Dolphin Oval, Sunshine Beach		10 May 2014
Maroochydore	17	Toads	24	Cotton Tree Oval, Maroochydore		10 May 2014
University		bye				

== Round 4 ==
Home team	Home team score	Away team	Away team score	Venue	Reference	Date
University	64	Maroochydore	0	University of the Sunshine Coast, Sippy Downs		24 May 2014
Toads	18	Noosa	36	Victory Park, Woombye		24 May 2014
Caloundra		bye				

== Round 5 ==
Home team	Home team score	Away team	Away team score	Venue	Reference	Date
Caloundra	30	Toads	22	Arther St, Caloundra		31 May 2014
Noosa	13	University	15	Dolphin Oval, Sunshine Beach		31 May 2014
Maroochydore		bye				

== Round 6 ==
Home team	Home team score	Away team	Away team score	Venue	Reference	Date
Noosa	25	Maroochydore	16	Dolphin Oval, Sunshine Beach		14 June 2014
Caloundra	22	University	31	Lighthouse Park, Caloundra		14 June 2014
Toads		bye				

== Round 7 ==
Home team	Home team score	Away team	Away team score	Venue	Reference	Date
University	22	Toads	49	University of the Sunshine Coast, Sippy Downs		21 June 2014
Maroochydore	20	Caloundra	21	Cotton Tree Oval, Maroochydore		21 June 2014
Noosa		bye				

== Round 8 ==
Home team	Home team score	Away team	Away team score	Venue	Reference	Date
Caloundra	8	Noosa	22	Lighthouse Park, Caloundra		28 June 2014
Toads	31	Maroochydore	24	Victory Park, Woombye		28 June 2014
University		bye				

== Round 9 ==
Home team	Home team score	Away team	Away team score	Venue	Reference	Date
University	27	Maroochydore	3	University Oval		5 July 2014
Noosa	18	Toads	13	Dolphin Oval, Sunshine Beach		5 July 2014
Caloundra		bye				

== Round 10 ==
Home team	Home team score	Away team	Away team score	Venue	Reference	Date
Toads	14	Caloundra	14	Victory Park, Woombye		12 July 2014
University	15	Noosa	24	University Oval, Sippy Downs		12 July 2014
Maroochydore		bye				

== Round 11 ==
Home team	Home team score	Away team	Away team score	Venue	Reference	Date
Maroochydore		Noosa		Cotton Tree		19 July 2014
University		Caloundra		University Oval		19 July 2014
Toads		bye				

== Round 12 ==
Home team	Home team score	Away team	Away team score	Venue	Reference	Date
Toads		University		Victory Park, Woombye		2 August 2014
Caloundra		Maroochydore		Arther St, Caloundra		2 August 2014
Noosa		bye				

== Round 13 ==
Home team	Home team score	Away team	Away team score	Venue	Reference	Date
Noosa		Caloundra		Sunshine Beach		9 August 2014
Maroochydore		Toads		Cotton Tree		9 August 2014
University		bye				

== Round 14 ==
Home team	Home team score	Away team	Away team score	Venue	Reference	Date
University		Maroochydore		Cotton Tree Oval, Maroochydore		16 August 2014
Toads		Noosa		Woombye		16 August 2014
Caloundra		bye				

== Round 15 ==
Home team	Home team score	Away team	Away team score	Venue	Reference	Date
Caloundra		Toads		Arther St, Caloundra		23 August 2014
Noosa		University		Victory Park, Woombye		23 August 2014
Maroochydore		bye				

== Semi finals ==
Home team	Home team score	Away team	Away team score	Venue	Reference	Date
Major Semi Final
University/Noosa		University/Noosa		TBD		30 August 2014
Minor Semi Final
Toads/Caloundra/Maroochydore		Toads/Caloundra/Maroochydore		TBD		30 August 2014

== Preliminary final ==
Home team	Home team score	Away team	Away team score	Venue	Reference	Date
Preliminary Final
University	19	Toads	10	University of the Sunshine Coast		6 September 2014

== Grand final ==
Home team	Home team score	Away team	Away team score	Venue	Reference	Date
Grand Final
Noosa	10	University	9	Sunshine Coast Stadium		13 September 2014
