= Eumundi Rugby Union Club =

- Full name: Eumundi Rugby Union Football Club
- Union: Queensland Rugby Union
- Branch: Sunshine Coast Rugby Union
- Region: Eumundi, Queensland
- Ground: Eumundi Showground
- League: Sunshine Coast Rugby Union

Eumundi Rugby Union Club is a rugby union football club based located in Eumundi, in the Sunshine Coast Region, Queensland, Australia. The club currently play in the Sunshine Coast Rugby Union junior competitions.

== History ==
The original Eumundi club played in the North Coast Rugby Union competition. Clubs in this competition would move over to rugby league.

It was unanimously decided to play 'the 'League' game for the ensuing year in place of 'Union[.]'

— From a report of the North Coast Rugby Union AGM.

A revived Eumundi returned to rugby union in the 21st century playing mainly in the junior ranks. They fielded an adult side for the first time since 1919 in 2020.

In 2022 the club is scheduled to host an A grade fixture for the first time. The contest is due to be between University and Caloundra.
