= Gympie Rugby Union Club =

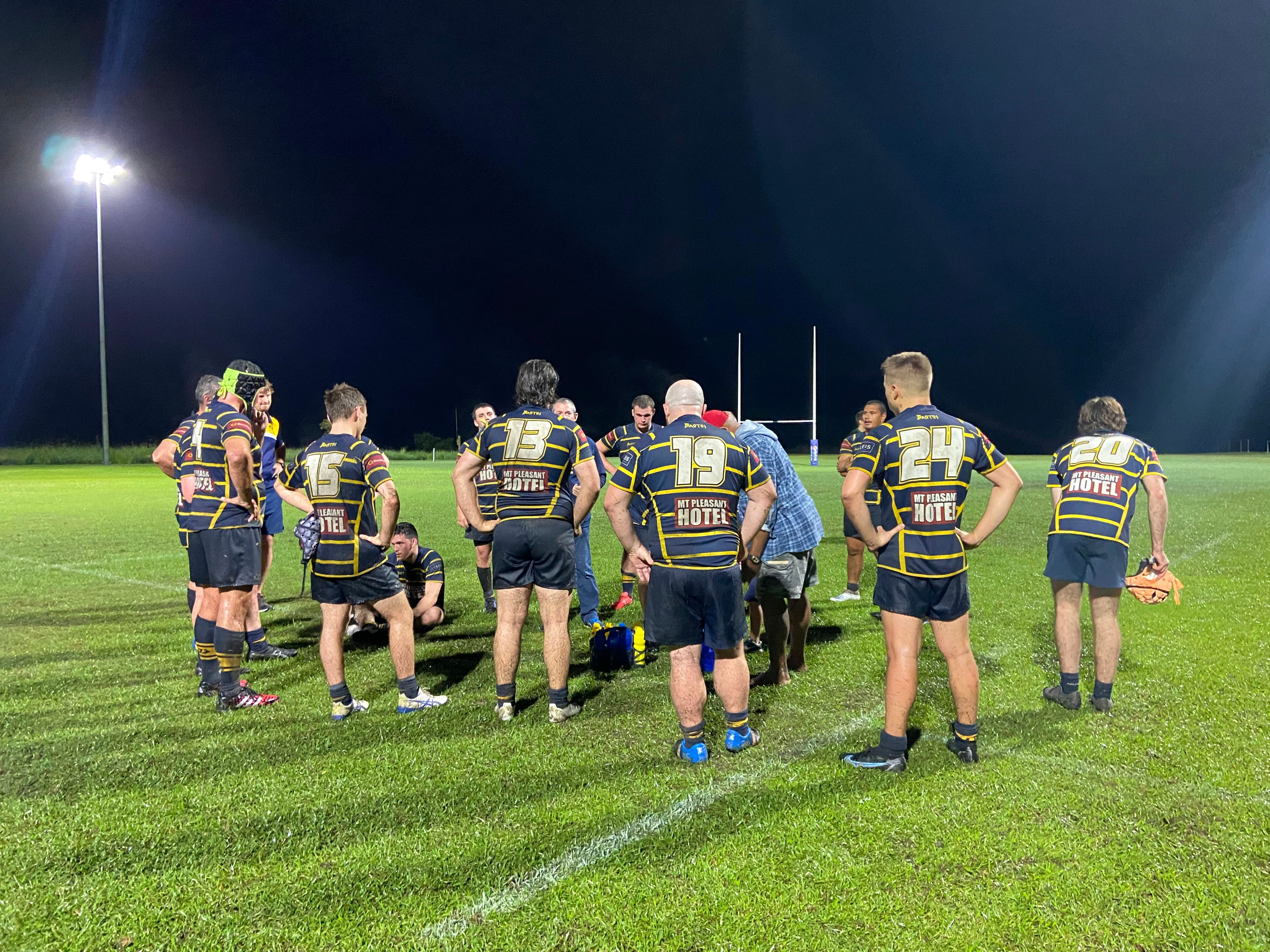
- Full name: Gympie Hammers Rugby Union Football Club
- Union: Queensland Rugby Union
- Branch: Sunshine Coast Rugby Union
- Region: Gympie, Queensland
- Ground: Albert Park
- League: Sunshine Coast Rugby Union

Gympie Hammers Rugby Union Club is a rugby union football club based located in Gympie, Queensland. The club currently play in the Sunshine Coast Rugby Union's Sunshine Coast Cup.

== History ==
The Gympie club was one of the clubs to contest the 1982 Sunshine Coast Rugby Union competition. Formed in 1980 and briefly folded in 2009

Gympie Hammers Rugby Union Club re-joined the Sunshine Coast competition in 2014 and has been going strong since. Their junior numbers as of 2022 are in excess of 250 players, with both a men's and women's Rugby teams competing on a senior level
