= Brisbane Irish Rugby Football Club =

Australian rugby union club, based in Brisbane

(Australia) Brisbane Irish RFC
- Union: Queensland Rugby Union
- Branch: Queensland Suburban Rugby Union
- Founded: 1996
- Location: Brisbane, Australia
- Ground: Everton Park SHS (Capacity: 1000)
- League: QSRU
- 2013: Semi-finalist
| 1st kit | 2nd kit |

The Brisbane Irish Rugby Football Club is an Australian rugby union club, based in Brisbane, Queensland. The club currently competes in the Queensland Suburban competition. Brisbane Irish won a prominent trade mark dispute with multi national company McDonald's over the use of the sponsorship logo "McBrat" in 2005. The club was established in 1996 and is now one of the largest suburban rugby clubs in Brisbane.

== History ==
Brisbane Irish Rugby Football Club originated as the Terrace Old Boys formed in 1994. A meeting of the team's players at Dooley's Irish Pub gave birth to the Brisbane Irish Rugby Football Club in 1996. The club operated out of Gregory Terrace's Tennyson playing fields until 1999 when the club moved for one season to Kenmore.

In 2000 the Brisbane Irish did not compete and in 2001, thanks largely to Paul Quaglia, Tom Nicol and Brendan Yantsch, the club re-formed and operated out of Purtell Park at Bardon in partnership with the West (Brisbane) Junior Rugby League Club. In 2007 the Brisbane Irish relocated to their current home ground Memorial Park, Enoggera in partnership with the Everton Park Rugby Union Sporting Association.

In 2003 the Irish expanded the club with 1st and 2nd Grade teams competing in the Queensland Suburban Division II competition. In 2005 the Irish 1st Grade team qualified for the club's first ever Grand Final and were runners up. In 2006 the club qualified both 1st and 2nd grade teams in the finals with the 2nds playing in the Grand Final and were also runners up.

In 2007 the club expanded again and fielded three senior teams in the first division Barber and Pegg Caps as well as the Scotney Cup, which it won in 2008. The Irish then went through a period of consolidation but produced a strong season in 2013, despite some key injuries, to reach the semi-final stage of the Barber Cup. The club competed in both the Barber and Pegg Cups in 2014.

== Home of the "McBrats" ==
The Brisbane Irish Rugby Football Club shot to national and international prominence when multinational company McDonald's filed a trademark dispute in March 2005 with the Australian Trademarks office over the club's use of "McBrat" on their playing shorts. McBrat, the sponsorship logo of former player and club sponsor Malcom McBratney, became the centre of a well publicised dispute as McDonald's claimed the prefix "Mc" as a trademark of the burger giant.

The story resonated throughout the world as the Brisbane Irish gained national and international coverage in their David v Goliath battle. Media agencies in Australia, New Zealand, England, Canada, France, Belgium and South Africa all reported in both television and print media the plight of the Brisbane Irish. In August 2006 the Australia Trademarks Office delivered its decision in favour of the Brisbane Irish and sponsor Malcom McBratney enabling the continued use of McBrat on the club's playing shorts.

The Brisbane Irish play an annual rugby match against Sydney Irish, usually held on the Gold Coast.

== Grand finals ==
Premiers

- 2008 Brisbane Irish 21–20 Pine Rivers Boars (Scotney Cup)

Runners-up

- 2005 Ipswich 20–7 Brisbane Irish (1st Grade)
- 2006 Wynnum 14–0 Brisbane Irish (2nd Grade)

== See also ==
- Rugby union in Queensland
