= D'Arcy Doyle =

Australian artist

d'Arcy William Doyle
- Born: 19 November 1931
- Died: 28 August 2001 (aged 68)

d'Arcy William Doyle (19 November 1932 – 28 August 2001) was an Australian painter known for his nostalgic and idealised depictions of Australian landscapes and historical scenes, particularly of bush life and childhood in Ipswich, Queensland.

== Early life and education ==
Doyle was born in Ipswich, Queensland, on 19 November 1932 to Thomas Doyle and Marguerite McGrath, an Irish Catholic working-class family; his father was a railway worker. He was educated at St Mary's Primary School and St Edmund's College. Largely self-taught, he showed an early interest in art and studied the work of local signwriters due to the limited artistic opportunities in Ipswich.

== Career ==
At age 18, Doyle enlisted in the Royal Australian Navy, serving for seven years and seeing active duty during the Korean War. After his naval service, he worked as a painter and signwriter, completing his signwriting apprenticeship with Daniel Russel Bedford's company "Bedford Ads" in Brisbane St, Bulimba. In 1961, he began working as a full-time artist.

During the 1960s, while based in Sydney, Doyle gained recognition after being commissioned to paint a mural for the Belmore Returned Services Club. This led to further commissions from other clubs. His work, influenced by American illustrator Norman Rockwell, often portrayed an idealised, nostalgic vision of Australian life, focusing on themes such as bushland, farm activities, childhood games, and sports.

In 1973, Doyle and his family returned to Queensland, settling in Mudgeeraba on the Gold Coast, where he lived and worked until his death.

== Personal life ==
Doyle married Jennefer Taylor in Brisbane in December 1968; the couple had two daughters. He died at home in Mudgeeraba on 28 August 2001 after a decade-long battle with bone cancer and was buried in the local cemetery.

== Legacy ==
Doyle's paintings were widely distributed as prints and licensed for use on calendars and other merchandise; it was estimated that one in ten Australian households owned a reproduction of his work. Following his death, the d'Arcy Doyle Art Awards were established to promote Australian art that reflects the national character. A public space in Ipswich, d'Arcy Doyle Place, was named in his honour.
