= Queensland Suburban Rugby Union =

Subbies
- Sport: Rugby union
- Founded: 1964 (Qld Sub-Districts R.U.) 1994 (Qld Suburban R.U.)
- QRU affiliation: 1964
- Website: qsru.com.au

The Queensland Suburban Rugby Union, or QSRU, is affiliated to the Queensland Rugby Union (QRU) and runs the rugby competition colloquially known as "Subbies" in Brisbane and South East Queensland.

The QSRU selects a representative side to play annual matches against NSW Suburban, for the Barraclough Shield. The major "Subbies" trophy is the Barber Cup, awarded to the first grade premiers of the first division.

The Subbies competition has around 1000 players and 20 clubs competing in three divisions, spread across Brisbane spanning from Redcliffe to Beenleigh, and Wynnum to Ipswich. The competition is for amateur players, and provides another tier of rugby below the Brisbane premier club competition.

== History ==
The earliest predecessors of the sub-districts rugby union in Queensland were the Minor Rugby Union and the Sub-Junior Minor Rugby Union, which were founded in 1888 and 1890 respectively for second and third tier teams.

Premiership winners: 1994–2002 ^{^{a}}
| | Division 1 A Grade | Division 1 Reserve |
| Cup Year | Norbert Byrne | Geoff R Pegg |
| 1994 | Kenmore | Ipswich |
| 1995 | Kenmore | Kenmore |
| 1996 | Logan Workers | Ipswich |
| 1997 | Logan Workers | Wynnum |
| 1998 | Logan City | Ipswich |
| 1999 | Logan City | Ipswich |
| Cup Year | Norbert Byrne | John Barber |
| 2000 | not contested | Everton Park |
| 2001 | Black Rhinos | Wests |
| 2002 | not contested | Easts Longhorns |
^^{a} Division 1 only, excluding 3rd grade and colts.

Premiership winners: 2003–2019 ^{^{b}}
| Cup Year | John Barber | Geoff R Pegg |
|---|---|---|
| 2003 | Black Rhinos | Murrumba |
| 2004 | Woogaroo | Black Rhinos |
| 2005 | Ipswich | Wynnum |
| 2006 | Ipswich | Wynnum |
| 2007 | Wynnum | Wynnum |
| 2008 | Goodna | Beenleigh |
| 2009 | Pine Rivers | Wynnum |
| 2010 | Ipswich | Redcliffe |
| 2011 | Pine Rivers | Beenleigh |
| 2012 | Ipswich | Match Drawn |
| 2013 | Redlands | Pine Rivers |
| 2014 | Wynnum | Pine Rivers |
| 2015 | Springfield | Wynnum |
| 2016 | Caboolture | Wynnum |
| 2017 | Pine Rivers | Pine Rivers |
| 2018 | Wynnum | Ipswich |
| 2019 | Goodna | Brisbane Irish |
^^{b} Top 2 competitions only.
Premiership winners: 2020 onwards
| Cup Year | John Barber | Women's |
| 2020 | Goodna | Redlands |
| 2021 | Goodna | Redlands |
| 2022 | Goodna | Coomera |
| 2023 | Brisbane Irish | Wests 2nds |
| 2024 | Redlands | Sunnybank |
| 2025 | Redlands | Wests Gold |

=== 1964–1999 ===
The Queensland Sub-District Rugby Union was founded in 1964. Mirror Newspapers donated the Sunday Truth Shield for the competition which was contested by nine teams including the Commonwealth Bank, AMP, Bank of New South Wales, and Law Clerks. The Gold Coast Eagles joined in 1965, winning the competition that year and in 1966, and finishing second in 1967.

The competition was restructured after the 1993 season to provide a secondary level of rugby under the Brisbane premiership. Strong district and suburban clubs in Brisbane were grouped into a new suburban competition sponsored by Coca-Cola. Teams in the renamed competition's inaugural season in 1994 included Caboolture and Everton Park to the north, Kenmore and Ipswich to the west, Redlands and Wynnum to the east, and Beenleigh and Logan City to the south.

Membership of the Subbies competition grew in the 1990s , Kenmore won the premiership in 1990 with several players from that team representing Qld in the Sub Districts team playing against NSW .With an increase in corporate and university sides as well as teams formed by ex-students of schools. The growth in population of Brisbane led to the growth in the number of rugby clubs.

When Coca-Cola's sponsorship ended after the 1998 season, the QSRU administered 47 teams representing 30 clubs in seven grades of competition spread across five divisions. Division I was composed of the Norbert Byrne Cup (1st grade), Geoff R. Pegg Cup (2nd grade), and Robert A. Tuckey Cup (Colts) competitions; with the club championship Sydney Cup awarded based on the best all round performance of the Division I clubs. The lower division competitions were the John Barber Cup (Division II), Edinburgh Cup (Division III), Ian Scotney Cup (Division IV), and Darwin V. Normanby Cup (Division V). A number of Division I clubs, however, had begun to experience problems in fielding a colts (under 20s) side.

From 1999 onwards, due to insufficient teams for a stand-alone colts competition, the Subbies clubs began to play their colts sides in the Brisbane or Gold Coast competitions.

=== 2000–2019 ===
The QSRU competition was reduced to four grades in 2000 when Ipswich and Logan City transferred to the Brisbane competition, Redlands relocated to the Gold Coast competition, and the QUT club folded. Wynnum and Everton Park, as the only former Division I clubs remaining, were merged into the lower division competitions.

New clubs, including the Black Rhinos and Brisbane Irish, were added in 2001 and the QSRU competition was restructured into three divisions. There were five grades in total, with the Barber, Pegg, Scotney, Wyatt, and Normanby Cups being contested. Promotion and relegation between the divisions was introduced in 2007.

In 2011, an under 19 representative Subbies team was selected to compete in the annual City v Country Carnival, however the QSRU has not been involved in administering colts rugby teams since then.

The QSRU had three divisions encompassing five grades of competition in 2014. In Division 2, the first grade Scotney Cup was incorporated into the Brisbane fourth grade competition for the 2014 and 2015 seasons to provide additional opposition teams, but was restored to a Subbies-only contest thereafter. Until 2012, the Wyatt Cup had been contested by the second grade teams in Division 2 but after four seasons without competition from 2013–2016, the trophy was re-purposed for an additional Division 3 competition in 2017.

In 2018 the Division 1 clubs were reduced to four in number—Caboolture, Goodna, Springfield and Wynnum—and to provide additional opposition the first and second grades played matches against clubs from the Sunshine Coast Rugby Union in the first half of the season.

At the completion of the 2018 season, the two Division 1 Grand Final teams - premiership winners Wynnum and Caboolture announced that they were leaving the QSRU competition, and would join the Sunshine Coast Rugby Union from the start of the 2019 season. The Queensland Suburban Rugby Union then had only one grade of competition within each of the three divisions in 2019 – the Barber Cup in Division 1, Pegg Cup in Division 2 and Normanby Cup in Division 3.

== Recent events ==
The Pegg Cup was not contested in 2020 and the Division 2 competition for men's teams was replaced by the inaugural women's competition in that year. The Women's Cup competition was played as twelve-a-side. Division 1 men's reserve grade was reinstated in 2021, with the Pegg Cup awarded as its competition trophy.

== Competition structure ==
The Queensland Suburban Rugby is made up of three divisions as of 2021, structured as follows:

Division 1 (Men's)
- 1st grade – Barber Cup
- 2nd grade – Pegg Cup

Division 2 (Women's 12s)
- Women's Cup

Division 3 (Men's Friday night)
- Normanby Cup

== Teams ==
Clubs competing for the Queensland Subbies trophies as of 2021, are:

Barber Cup:

- Brisbane Irish
- Goodna Gladiators
- Ipswich Rangers
- North Lakes Leopards
- Redlands Mudcrabs
- Riverside Rebels
- Springfield Lakes Hawks

Pegg Cup:

- Brisbane Irish
- Goodna Gladiators
- Ipswich Rangers
- North Lakes Leopards
- Redlands Mudcrabs
- Springfield Lakes Hawks

Women's Cup:

- Brisbane Irish
- Coomera Crushers
- Logan City Saints
- North Lakes Leopards
- Redlands Mudcrabs
- Brisbane Hustlers

Normanby Cup

- Brisbane Hustlers
- Brisbane Irish
- Ipswich Rangers
- Logan City Saints
- Southern Bay Cyclones

== Representative team ==
Qld Subbies colours

A Queensland Suburban team is selected from players within the competition each year to play against other amateur representative sides.

Until the end of the 2011 season, an under 19 representative Subbies team was also selected to compete in the annual City v Country Carnival. An annual interstate match against NSW Suburban for the Barraclough Shield was played from 1966 to 2016.

== See also ==
- Rugby union in Queensland
- Rugby union in Australia

== Bibliography ==
- Horton, Peter (2009). "Rugby Union Football in the Land of the Wallabies, 1874-1949: same game, different ethos". The International Journal of the History of Sport. 26 (11): 1611–1629. doi:10.1080/09523360903169925. S2CID 143976861.
- Meares, Peter; O'Hare, John; Meaney, James (2012). Creagh, Vincent J. (ed.). A History of the University of Queensland Rugby Football Club: The First Hundred Years (PDF). Archived from the original (PDF) on 16 June 2021.
