= Sunshine Coast Rugby Union =

Australian rugby competition

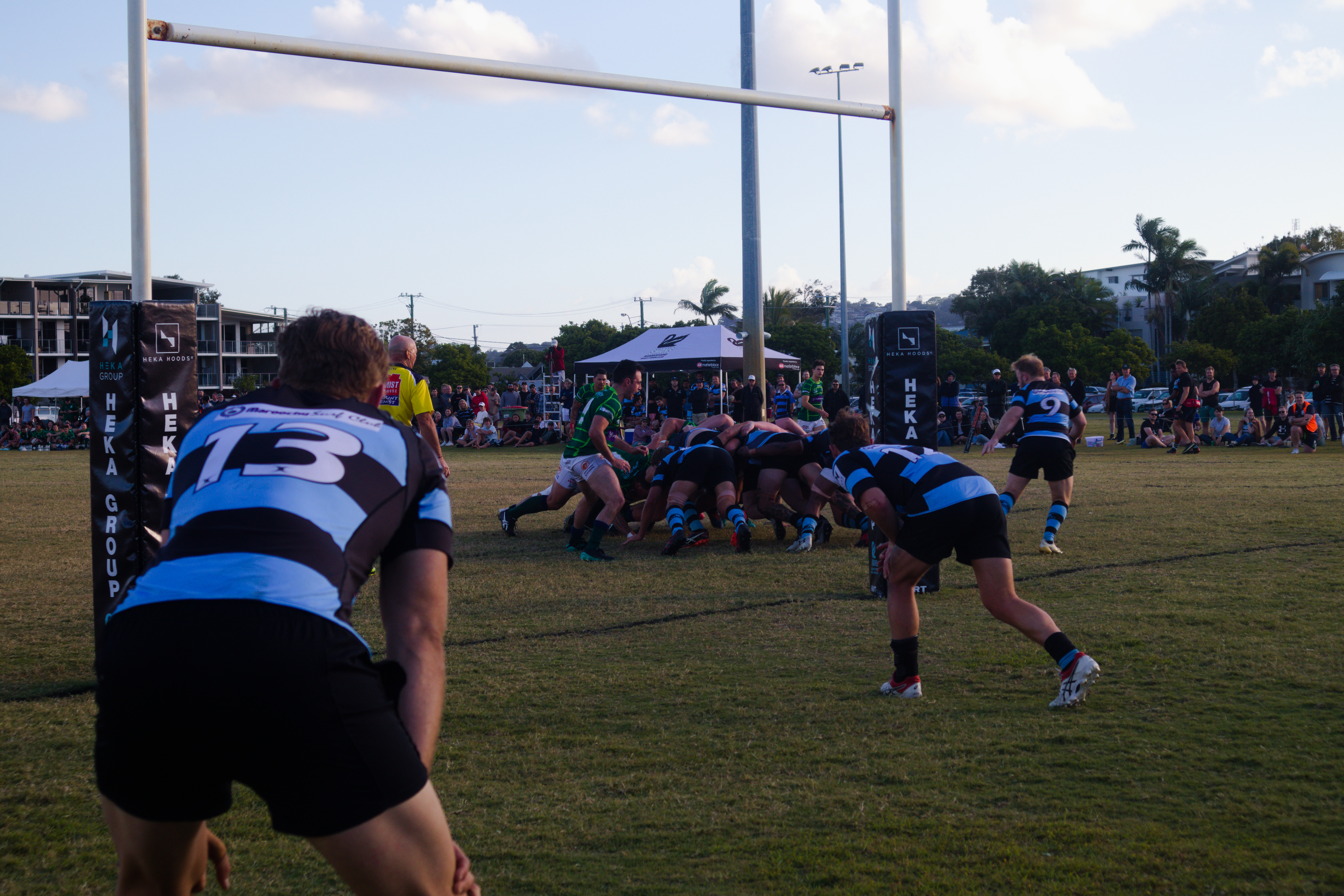
- Sport: Rugby Union
- Jurisdiction: Sunshine Coast, Queensland
- Abbreviation: SCRU
- Founded: 1982
- Affiliation: Queensland Rugby Union
- Regional affiliation: Queensland Country Rugby Union
- Headquarters: Stockland Park

Official website
- scru.com.au
- (Queensland)

The Sunshine Coast Rugby Union is the local rugby union competition on Australia's Sunshine Coast. Through Sunshine Coast Rugby Union Limited it serves as the governing body for rugby on the Sunshine Coast.

== History ==
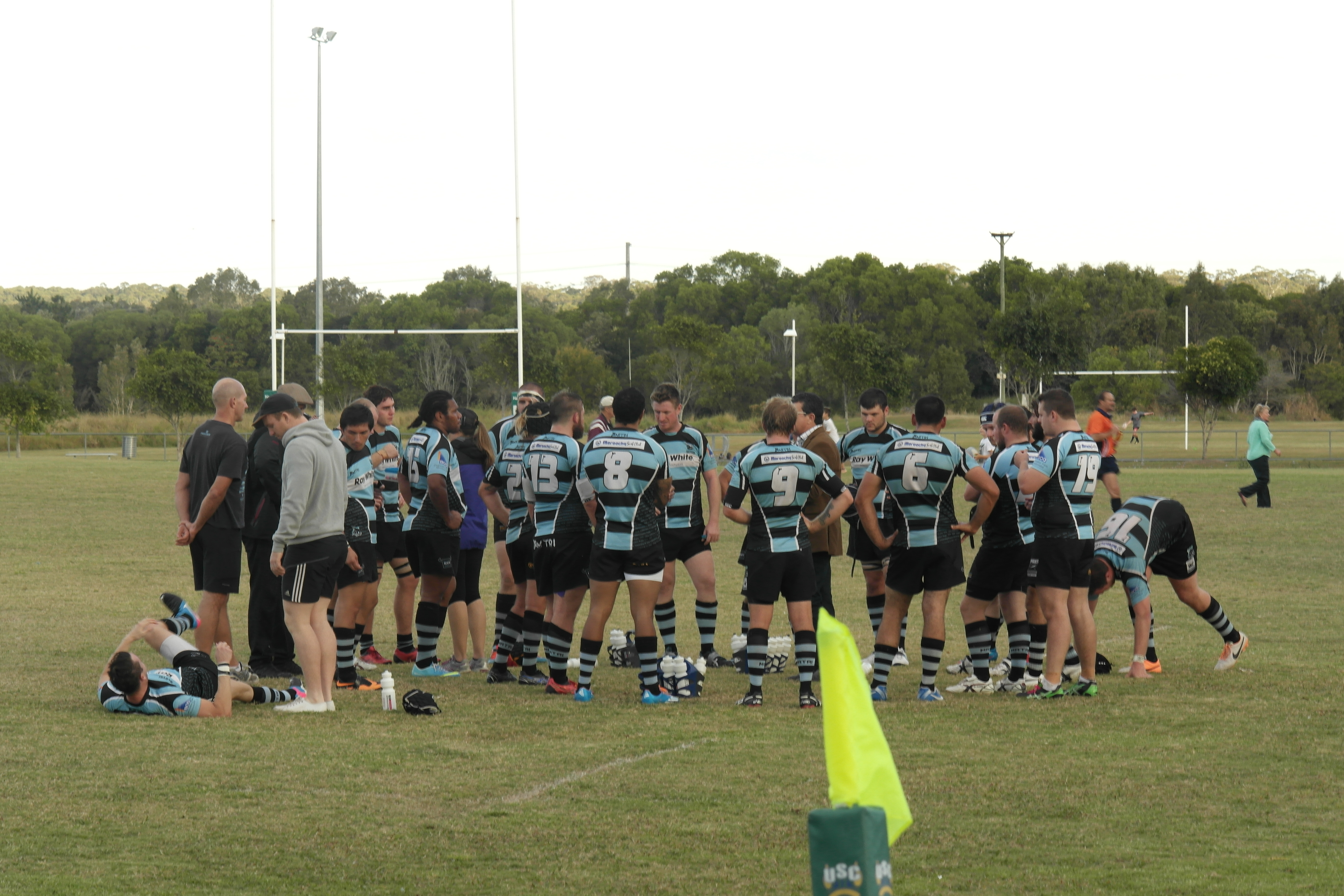
Maroochydore played in the Queensland Suburban Rugby Union competition before the formation of the SCRU.

The Sunshine Coast and District Rugby Union was established in 1982, the first time an organised rugby union competition existed on the Coast since 1919. Various junior competitions have been established since including a club competition and a schools comp.

The following clubs contested the 1982 season

- Maroochydore Swans
- Nambour Toads
- Caloundra Lighthouses
- Gympie Hammers

Maroochydore and Noosa were the only two clubs to win the Sunshine Coast A-grade rugby union premiership from 1982 through 2006. University were the team to break this run — winning in 2007, 2008, and 2009. Noosa reclaimed the premiership in 2010, before University, Caboolture and Maroochydore won the next three respectively. Noosa claimed the title back in the 2014 season. In 2015 the grand final home ground advantage was awarded to USC for their win against Noosa in the A grade Major semi. The 2015 grand finals were contested by USC and Noosa in A grade and Caloundra and Noosa in reserve grade at University of the Sunshine Coast. USC and Caloundra were crowned champions.

=== Amalgamation of regional bodies ===
In response to the Queensland Rugby Union's efforts, four separate organizations amalgamated to form the Sunshine Coast Rugby Union Ltd in 2009. The four organizations were the Sunshine Coast and District Rugby Union, the Sunshine Coast and District Junior Rugby Union, Sunshine Coast Rugby Union Referees Association and Sunshine Coast Rugby Union Schools Association.

=== 2020–present ===
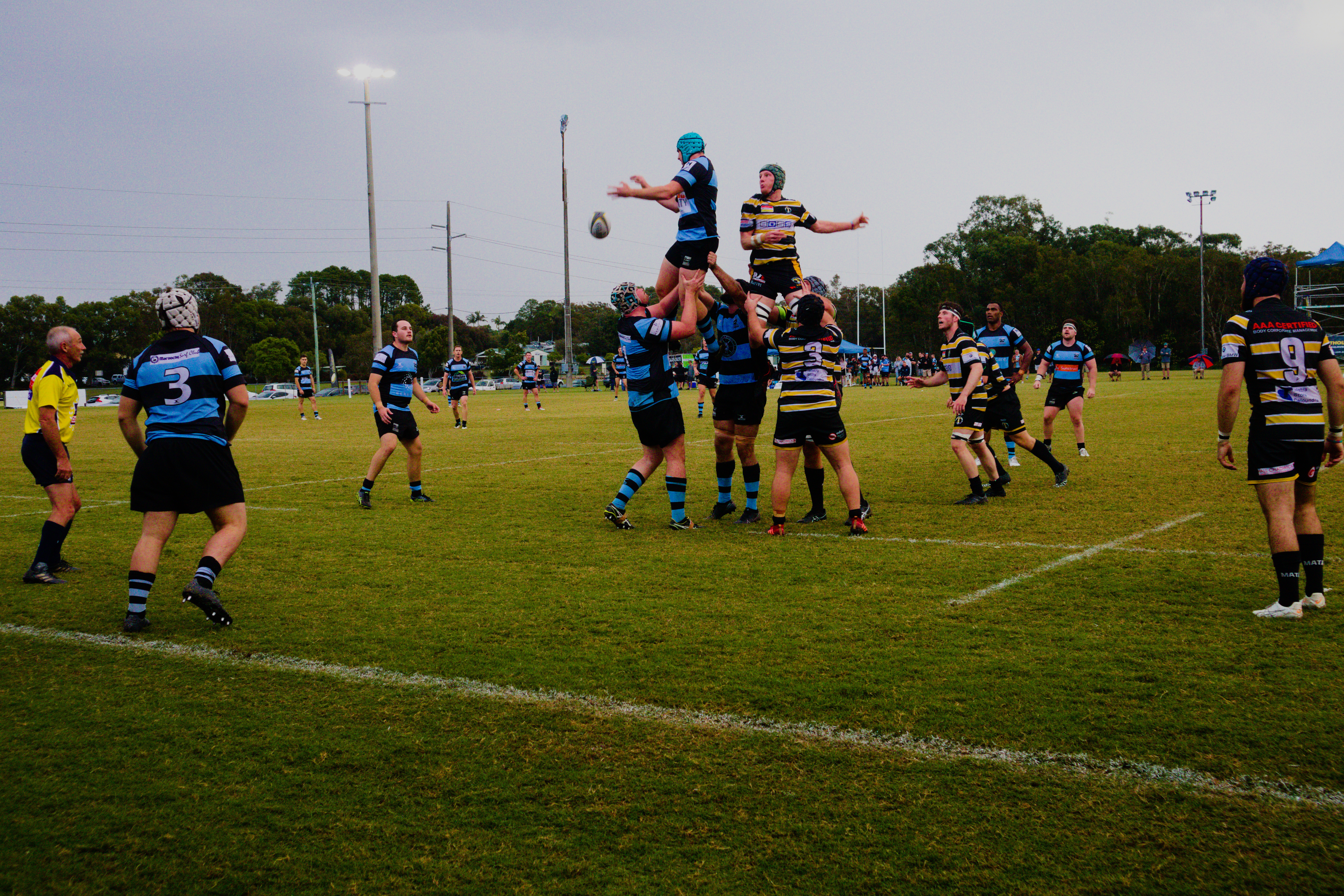
Caloundra hosted Maroochydore in round 3 of the 2020 A grade season on August 15 of that year.

==== Eumundi and Maleny ====
2020 saw Eumundi enter its first adult side since the 1919 North Coast season. Their entry into reserve grade brought that grade to 10 teams. However, Maleny would withdraw its reserve grade side citing various reasons.

==== Effect of COVID-19 ====
The 2020 season began on March 15. Two days later it was suspended, due to the growing COVID-19 pandemic.

Under the draw in place at the start of the season, the Women's season was scheduled to start on April 18, with the A grade and Colts Under 19's seasons beginning on April 25. Reserve grade kicked off as scheduled on March 15, two days before the season was suspended.

We’ll class [the games in March] as a preseason round because we’ve had to do a new draw for the senior rugby.

— Mike Aronsten, SCRU Competitions Manager

The season restarted on August 1. A grade, the women's 12 a side, and Colts Under 19's are all due to be a double round robin while

Reserve grade is due to be single round robin.

Season 2021 started as planned. Eumundi withdrew its only side after a few rounds.

Due to a lockdown imposed on all bar one of the local government area with an SCRU team – Gympie – the season was suspended with one home and away round to play.

== Competitions ==
Noosa vs University in 2014

The Sunshine Coast Rugby Union senior club competitions include:

- A grade
- Reserve grade
- Colts (not contested between 2013 and 2017)
- Women's 10s

== Clubs ==
University vs Maroochydore in 2014

Clubs that compete in the senior competitions, as of 2020, are:

- Brothers Sunshine Coast
- Caboolture Snakes (Note: Caboolture Snakes returned to the Sunshine Coast senior competition for the 2019 season after five seasons with the Queensland Suburban Rugby Union (QRSU). Caboolture played on the Sunshine Coast from 1998 to 2013, after a previous stint with QSRU subbies.)
- Caloundra Lighthouses
- Eumundi Dragons
- Gympie Hammers
- Maroochydore Swans
- Nambour Toads
- Noosa Dolphins
- University of Sunshine Coast Barbarians
- Wynnum

== Representative teams ==
Stingrays colours

The SCRU selects representative teams each year which compete under the name "Stingrays". The senior men's Sunshine Coast Stingrays teams played in the Queensland Premier Rugby competition from 2005 to 2013 but after facing funding difficulties in the lead up to the 2014 season are now focused on the Queensland Country Championships. The women's Stingrays compete in rugby sevens tournaments such as the Nambour Sevens and the Ballymore Sevens.

== See also ==
- Rugby union in Queensland
