= Ipswich Cats AFC =

Australian rules football club

Ipswich

Names
- Full name: Ipswich Cats Australian Football Club
- Nickname(s): Cats

Club details
- Founded: 1959; 66 years ago
- Colours
- Competition: QFA Div 4
- Ground(s): Ivor Marsden Memorial Sports Centre

Uniforms
Home

Ipswich Cats Australian Football Club is an Australian rules football club based at Ivor Marsden Memorial Sports Centre in Amberley suburb of West Ipswich. The club currently has mixed Junior and Men's Senior teams in the QFA Division 4, managed by the AFL Queensland.

== History ==
The club was established in 1959 by an Australian football enthusiast by the name of Noel Kimlin. Noel had his wife sew red numbers onto 50 blue t-shirts for two teams to use. The club was given an oval in Ipswich but not allowed to cut down the trees in the middle. The club organised matches with Kelvin Grove Teachers College and a social group of ex-pat southerners at Palm Beach. The club played 1963 in the Gold Coast AFL. The following year they joined the South Queensland AFA. Winning 3 premierships in 30 years.

A lack of interest caused the club to go into recess in 1995.

Ipswich became a growth corridor for Brisbane and the AFL were keen to develop the game in the area. The club was reformed as the Ipswich Central Junior AFC and concentrated on encouraging young children to learn the game. The club embarked on a total rebuild from the ground up, starting with under age sides before the list matured enough to form a senior side in 2017.

Currently the Ipswich Cats Australian Football Club has both Junior & Senior Teams.

== Premierships ==
- SQAFA Div 2
  - 1979, 1991
- BFA Div 2
  - 1993
