= Wynnum Rugby Union Club =

Australian rugby union club, based in Wynnum, QLD

Wynnum Bugs
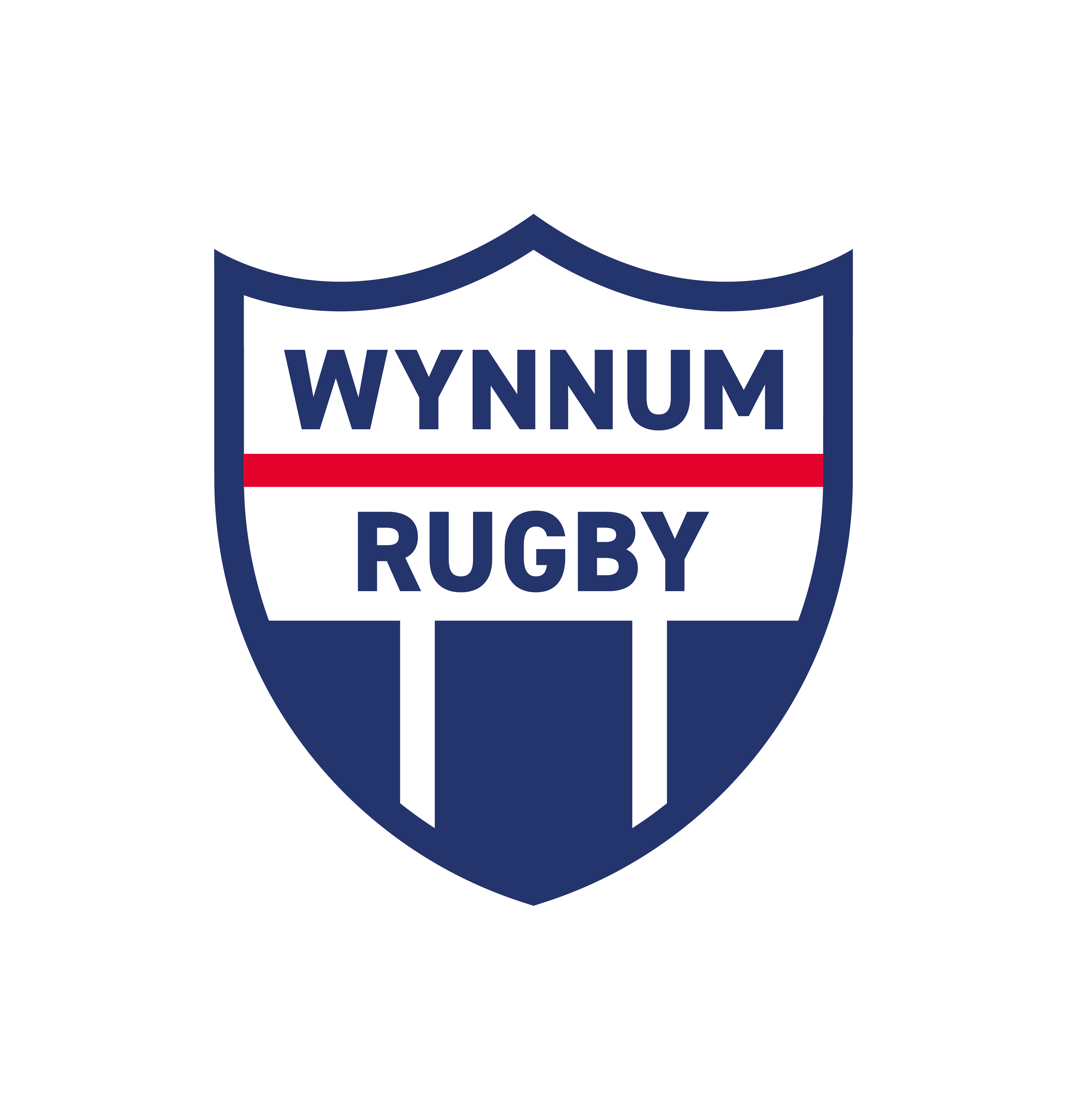
- Full name: Wynnum & Districts Rugby Union Club
- Union: Queensland Rugby Union
- Branch: Sunshine Coast Rugby Union
- Founded: 1929 Re-established 1979
- Region: Wynnum, Queensland
- Ground: Elanora Park
- President: Kristine Hore
- League: Sunshine Coast Rugby Union
- 2018: QSRU Barber Cup Premiers

Official website
- wynnumrugby.com.au

The Wynnum Rugby Union Club, known as Wynnum Bugs, is a rugby union football club located in Wynnum, in Queensland, Australia. The original Wynnum club was one of the founding teams of the Brisbane Premiership (now Queensland Premier Rugby) that was formed by the revived Queensland Rugby Union in 1929.

The club now plays in the Sunshine Coast Rugby Union competition, after having been in the Brisbane-based QSRU competition for several decades. Wynnum's junior teams play in the Brisbane Junior Rugby Union (BJRU) competition.

== Name and colours ==
The Wynnum Bugs' nickname comes from the Moreton Bay Bug, a species of lobster found in Moreton Bay, near Wynnum. The team's colours are red, white and blue.

== History ==
The original Wynnum Rugby Union Football Club was formed in 1929, and played in the Brisbane Premiership that year.

In 1979, the club was refounded when 7-year-old Evan Willis asked his father Jeff "Willo" if he could "play the game that they play at Ballymore in Wynnum". When Jeff discovered that there wasn't a rugby union club in Wynnum, his wife Pam and himself starting work to establish the Wynnum Junior Rugby Union Club. The club was based at an old rubbish dump, Elanora Park, on the Foreshore in the north of Wynnum.

The "Wynnum Bugs" were almost named the "Wynnum Muddies". But, the Redlands Rugby Club who were established at a similar time, claimed the "Muddies" nickname and the Wynnum club then became known as the "Moreton Bay Bugs".

The first team to play under the Wynnum Bugs name was an U8's fixture against Ascot-Clayfield on the 11th of April, 1979 and recorded a 20-16 win.

Since 1979, where the club fielded only a couple junior teams, the Bugs gradually grew throughout the 1980's in teams and playing numbers. In 1989, club president Milton Lovell's efforts to field an under 16s in 1987, the Bugs would field their first ever senior (over 18) side, a Colts under 19s side.

The first open age Senior team was assembled in 1990. Wynnum was amongst the inaugural clubs to play in the restructured Queensland Suburban Rugby competition sponsored by Coca-Cola in 1994, and its junior teams played in the Brisbane Junior Rugby Union (BJRU) competition. In The QSRU competition, the Bugs won multiple 2nd grade, 3rd grade, and Colts premierships across this time period. However, the 1st grade was yet to win a premiership, after making multiple grand finals though the 1990s and early 2000s.

Wynnum won the Barber Cup for the QSRU Division I premiership in 2007. The team finished as runner up in 2012 and 2013, The Wynumm Bugs regained the Barber Cup in 2014, defeating Caboolture 45–42 in the grand final at Ballymore. The club also won the Sydney Cup for the QSRU club championship in 2014.

In 2018 they defeated Caboolture in the Barber Cup Grand Final before both clubs decided to join the Sunshine Coast Rugby Union competition for the 2019 season.

Three Wynnum players were selected in the 2022 Sunshine Coast Stingrays squad.
