= Sunshine Coast Cricket Association =

Cricket competition in Queensland, Australia

- Current season, competition or edition: 2019/2020
- Sport: Cricket
- Founded: 1946 or earlier
- No. of teams: 68 (approx)
- Country: Australia
- Most recent champions: Yandina (Women's Tier 1); Maroochydore (Division 1 One Day); Tewantin Noosa (Division 1 Twenty20)

The Sunshine Coast Cricket Association is a cricket competition and administrative body on Australia's Sunshine Coast.

The competition has been established for over sixty years.

== Competition ==
The competition is split into 6 divisions, with the 3rd and 4th divisions split into a further two divisions and the 6th division split into regions (north and south). Each division has approximately 8 teams who play each other twice in one two-day match and one one-day match.

=== Clubs ===
- Buderim
- Burpengary
- Caboolture
- Caloundra
- Coolum
- Cooroy-Eumundi
- Glasshouse
- Gympie
- Landsborough
- Maleny
- Maroochydore
- Nambour
- Palmwoods
- Tewantin-Noosa
- Wamuran-Stanley River
- Yandina
