= Phil Mooney =

Australian-born rugby union coach and former player

- Born: Philip Mooney; 19 January 1965 (age 61) Brisbane

Rugby union career
- Position: Fly-half
Senior career
Years	Team	Apps	(Points)
1985–1995	Wests Rugby		
Coaching career
- Years: Team
- 2000–2002, 12: Wests Rugby
- 2007–2009: Queensland Reds
- 2010–2011: Otago
- 2013: Panasonic Wild Knights

Philip Mooney is an Australian-born professional rugby union coach and former player. He coached Japanese team Panasonic Wild Knights in 2012, winning the Top League title that season, and prior to that was head coach of the Queensland Reds in the Super 14 competition.

== Early life ==
Born in Brisbane on 19 January 1965 and is the son of former Australian rugby hooker Paul Mooney. Phil Mooney was an accomplished fly-half at junior level and premier level. Mooney attended Brisbane Grammar School and played in the First XV at number 10 for three years. He was selected in Queensland schoolboys and played in the Brisbane under 19 team and later the Brisbane opens team.

== Playing career ==
He played over 100 premier games for Brisbane rugby club Wests between 1986 and 1994. He was part of the Australian Club Championship winning side in 1986 against Parramatta (22-12). His team were also runners up in the World Club Championship in France that same year.

Mooney was an accomplished cricketer playing three years in Brisbane Grammar School First XI (one year as captain). His cricket career led him towards 8 years in First Class Cricket for Western Suburbs Cricket Club in Brisbane. However, it was his rugby career that directed him to becoming a professional coach. From 1986 to 1994 he played Premier grade in the position of fly-half. In 1995 he coached Colts One (now called Premier Colts), and coached Premiership winning Colts One for Wests in 1997 and 1998.

== Coaching career ==
In 1999 he became assistant coach of the Wests Premier team with Damien Reidy and in 2000 and 2001 coached Premier level with David Nucifora. In 2002 he coached Premier level with Angus Baker. His professional career took off in 2003 with acceptance to the High Performance Program at the Queensland Academy of Sport.

In 2006 Mooney coached the Australian Under 19 team winning the Junior World Cup against New Zealand (17-13) in the UAE. This is the only Junior World Cup title (U19s, U20s U21s) won by Australia since the tournaments started in 2004. Mooney's 2006 team included players Will Genia, Quade Cooper, Anthony Fainga'a, Saia Fainga'a, Digby Ioane, Christian Lealiifano and Lachlan Turner.

He became assistant coach to Eddie Jones at the Queensland Reds in 2007 and took over as Head Coach of the Reds in 2008. He came into the role to rebuild the team after a 92-3 thrashing by the Bulls. He recruited many of the young players from his world cup winning junior side. At the end of 2009 he was sacked by the QRU as playmaker Berrick Barnes defected to the NSW Waratahs. Mooney claimed the new young players were the future and his time in the role of rebuilding the team was cut short.

At the end of 2009 he worked for rugby league team the Brisbane Broncos as a specialist skills coach. He then was appointed Head Coach of Otago for the National Provincial Championship for 2010 and 2011.

In 2012 he returned to Brisbane and coached Wests Premier team. In 2013 he moved to Japan and coached the Panasonic Wild Knights and won the Top League and also the All-Japan Rugby Football Championship. The feat of winning both titles had only been done twice before. In 2014 Mooney was assistant coach at Panasonic with Robbie Deans and again won another Top League title. Mooney returned to Brisbane in 2015 and accepted the role of Director of Rugby at the prestigious Brisbane Grammar School.
