= Easts Tigers Rugby Union =

Australian rugby union club, based in Brisbane

(Australia) Easts Tigers
- Full name: Easts Rugby Union (Inc)
- Union: Queensland Rugby Union
- Nickname: Tigers
- Founded: 1947; 79 years ago
- Region: Brisbane
- Ground(s): C.P Bottomley Park 31 Halifax Street, Norman Park QLD 4170 (Capacity: 20,000+)
- President: Troy Williamson
- Director of Rugby: Mosese Rauluni
- Coach: Phil Burleigh
- League: Queensland Premier Rugby
Team kit

Official website
- www.eaststigers.com

Easts Rugby Union Club (formally Brisbane State High School Old Boys, also known as the "Tigers") is an Australian rugby union club based in Brisbane, Queensland.

Easts competes in the Queensland Premier Rugby competition against nine other Rugby Union clubs and mainly attracts players Southern and Eastern suburbs of Brisbane, ranging from West End to Capalaba, and south to Mt Gravatt. The club was established in 1947 and has won the Hospital Cup for the Queensland Premiership five times. (1997, 1999, 2008, 2013, 2020)

The club is located at C.P. Bottomley Park, Norman Park where it has a clubhouse, canteens and the use of three fields, with David Wilson field being the main playing field for premier grade.

Easts Rugby Union is incorporated as a not-for-profit association.

== History of Easts ==
=== Early Foundations 1947-1997 ===
The history of Easts Rugby Union dates to 1947, when a group of Old Boys from Brisbane State High School competed as Colts. In 1949, Easts was formally established as part of the Queensland Premier Rugby's move towards a district-based competition.

The club's early years were began with developing its playing base while competing for success in Brisbane club rugby. The club played (and continues to) at Bottomley Park, a ground constructed on the site of a former rubbish tip. Former first-grade fullback Glynn Gauld recalled playing there during the early 1950s, when pieces of tin and glass could occasionally emerged from the playing surface.

Easts produced its first Australian representative in 1954, when hooker Paul Mooney was selected for the Wallabies for two Tests against Fiji. Further representatives followed in later decades, including Bruce Cooke, Paul Kahl and Nigel Holt.

Despite producing representative players, Easts endured a fifty year wait for its first first-grade premiership. The club reached the Brisbane grand final on three separate occasions without securing the title, including defeats to Brothers Rugby Club in 1971 and 1984 and to Souths Rugby Club in 1995.

=== Premiership Success 1997-2020 ===
After five decades without a first-grade premiership, Easts finished their 50th anniversary defeating Souths 18–16 in the Hospital Cup grand final. Captain Peter "Bull" Murdoch, who had played more than 200 first-grade matches for Easts, led the club to its first premiership.

Easts won a second premiership in 1999, defeating Wests 16–15. Additionally, with the formation of the Women's Founders Cup in the 1990s and 2000s Easts won multiple Women's Premiership titles going back-to-back in 2002 and 2003 before winning in 2005 and four-peating from 2008 to 2011.

The club returned to the top of the competition in 2008 beating Brothers 27-22, before capturing its first Australian Club Championship in 2009 against Sydney University Football Club. Further premierships followed in 2013 beating GPS Rugby 27-22 and in 2020, when former Wallabies captain Ben Mowen led Easts to victory against UQ Rugby 33-18.

The 2020 premiership was particularly successful for the club, with Easts achieving a "six-from-six" premiership week across the club's grades, with Premier Grade, Premier Women, Second Grade, Third Grade, Fifth Grade and Colts 4 all winning in the Grand Final. Additionally winning the Australian Club Championship for a second time in 2021 against Gordon Rugby 14-13.

=== Current Day 2020 - Present ===
Following its successes, Easts has remained a competitive club in Queensland Premier Rugby. The club has maintained strong senior men's, colts and women's programs, with notably its junior programs being one of the largest junior programs in the southern hemisphere with nearly 1000 junior players active.

The strength of the junior program has contributed to the club's long-term success, with players progressing through the junior and Colts grades into Premier Grade. The pathway has also produced representative players, with Easts' Colts program regularly competing for premierships and developing into higher levels with examples of players such as Liam Wright.

In recent years, Easts has continued to compete at the top level of Queensland club rugby, including strong performances in both the men's Hospital Cup and women's Founders Cup competitions, remaining an established Queensland rugby club.

== Grand Final results ==
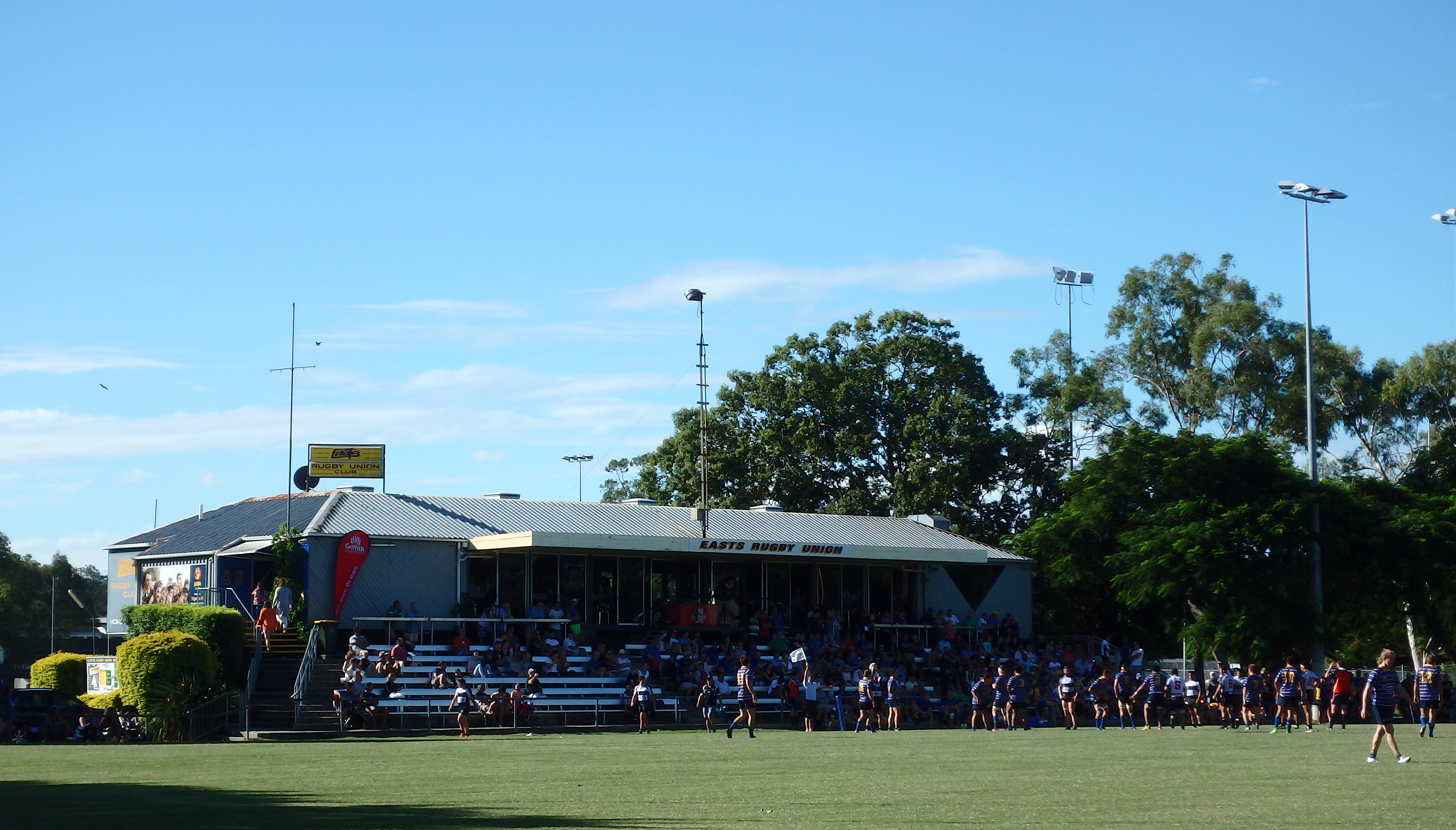
Grand Stand at Bottomley Park.

=== Men's Premierships (Hospital Challenge Cup) ===
- 1997 Easts 18-16 Souths
- 1999 Easts 16-15 Wests
- 2008 Easts 22-21 Brothers
- 2013 Easts 27-22 GPS
- 2020 Easts 33-18 University

=== Runners-Up (Vince Nicholls Memorial Trophy) ===
- 1971 Brothers 17-3 Easts
- 1984 Brothers 18-3 Easts
- 1995 Souths 27-11 Easts
- 2003 Canberra Vikings 45-3 Easts
- 2015 Souths 39-12 Easts

=== Women's Premierships (Founders Cup) ===
- 2002
- 2003
- 2005
- 2008
- 2009
- 2010
- 2011
- 2020
- 2021

=== Australian Club Championships ===
- 2009 Easts 38-31 Sydney University
- 2021 Easts 14-13 Gordon Rugby

== International representatives ==
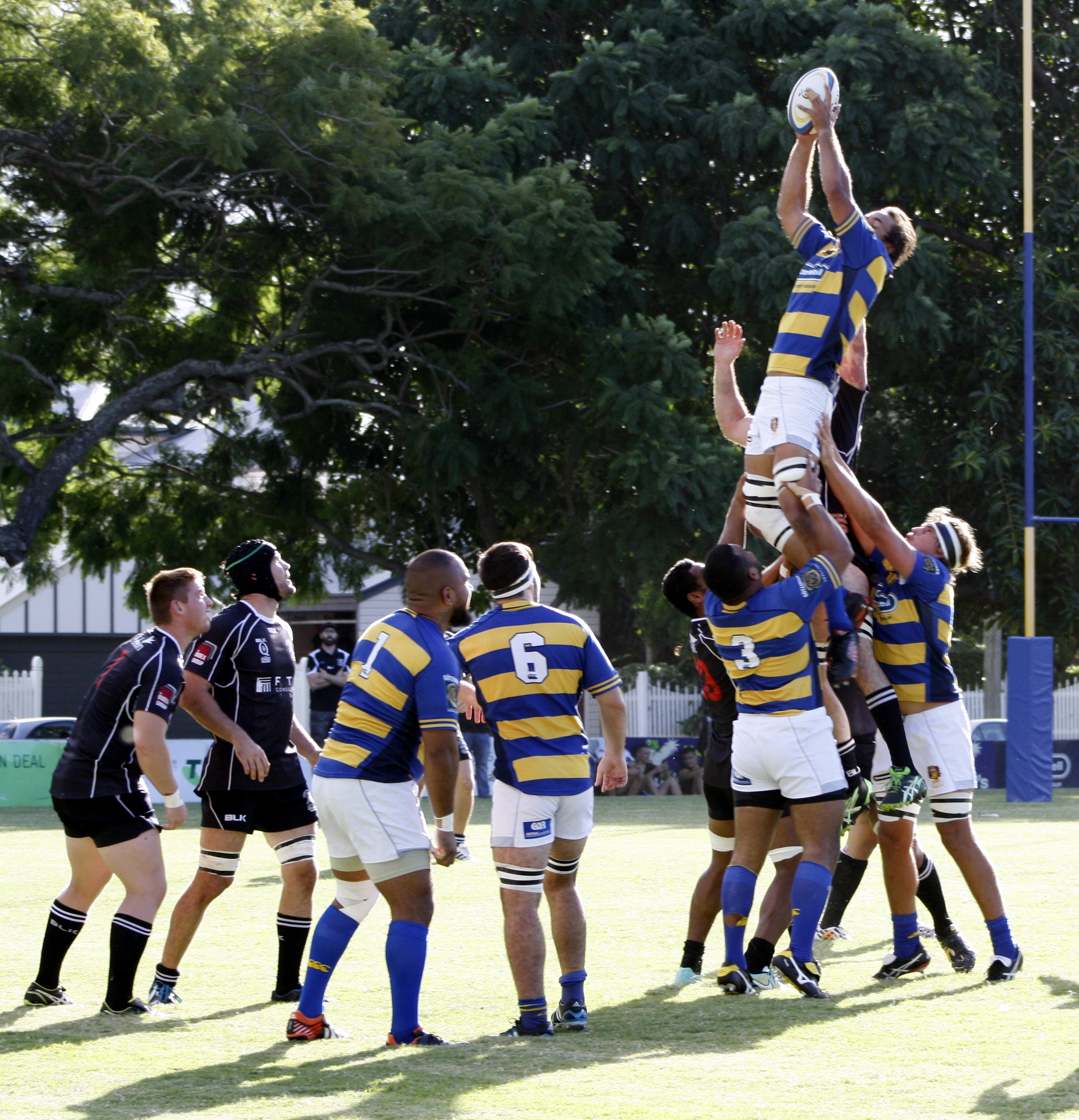
Easts win a lineout. Easts vs Souths rugby union at Bottomley Park on 11 April 2015.

=== Australia ===
- Paul Kahl
- Jeremy Paul
- David Wilson
- Gene Fairbanks
- Andrew Walker (rugby)
- Peter McLean
- Ed Quirk
- Ben Mowen
- Ross Cullen
- Bruce Cooke
- Nigel Holt
- Liam Wright
- Selena Worsley
- Kiri Lingman
- Shannon Mato
- Toa Filimoehala
- Tiarna Molloy

=== Fiji ===
- Jacob Rauluni
- Mosese Rauluni
- Seta Tawake

== See also ==
- Queensland Premier Rugby
- Rugby union in Queensland
