= Josh Nasser =

Australian rugby union player

- Born: 23 June 1999 (age 27) Brisbane, Queensland, Australia
- Height: 1.90 m (6 ft 3 in)
- Weight: 111 kg (245 lb; 17 st 7 lb)
- School: St Joseph's College
- Notable relatives: Brendan Nasser (father); Isabella Nasser (sister)

Rugby union career
- Position(s): Hooker, Prop
- Current team: Reds
Senior career
Years	Team	Apps	(Points)
2018–2019	Brisbane City	8	(0)
2020–	Reds	51	(50)
- Correct as of 6 June 2026
International career
Years	Team	Apps	(Points)
2019	Australia U20	5	(0)
2024–	Australia	18	(10)
- Correct as of 17 October 2026
Medal record
Men's rugby union
Representing Australia
Oceania U20 Championship
Winner	2019 Gold Coast
Junior World Cup
Runner-up	2019 Argentina

Josh Nasser (born 23 June 1999) is an Australian professional rugby union player who plays as a hooker for Super Rugby club Queensland Reds and the Australia national team.

== Early life ==
Nasser was born on 23 June 1999 in Brisbane, Australia, and grew up playing rugby union whilst attending St Joseph's College. His father, Brendan Nasser, was a former Wallaby flanker who represented Australia eight times and was part of the 1991 Rugby World Cup winning squad. His sister Isabella Nasser also thrived, rising through the ranks in women's rugby sevens and capturing the spotlight herself on the Olympic stage.

== International career ==
Nasser began his international rugby career with the Junior Wallabies, where he represented Australia at under-20 level in 2018 and 2019, originally as a tighthead prop. As he transitioned into the professional game, Nasser shifted to hooker, developing his scrummaging and lineout skills to become a more complete front-rower. His progress at Super Rugby level with the Queensland Reds eventually earned him a call-up to the Wallabies.

In July 2024, Nasser made his test debut in Melbourne, coming off the bench in the second test against Wales. Since then, he has gone on to collect multiple caps, establishing himself as part of the Wallabies' front-row rotation. In 2025, Nasser had secured a place in the Wallabies squad for The Rugby Championship tour of South Africa.
