= Souths Rugby =

Australian rugby union club, based in Brisbane, QLD

- Full name: Souths Rugby Union Club
- Nickname: Magpies
- Founded: 1948; 78 years ago
- Location: Annerley; Yeronga Memorial Park; South Brisbane
- Region: Brisbane, Queensland, Australia
- Ground: R.A. 'Chipsy' Wood Oval
- Coach: Adrian Thompson
- League: Queensland Premier Rugby
- 2025: 5th
1st kit	2nd kit

Official website
- southsrugby.com

Souths Rugby Club or Souths is an Australian rugby union club based in Brisbane, and the Southern districts area that currently plays in the Queensland Premier Rugby club competition. The club was established in 1948, and since then has produced a host of Queensland and Wallaby rugby players.

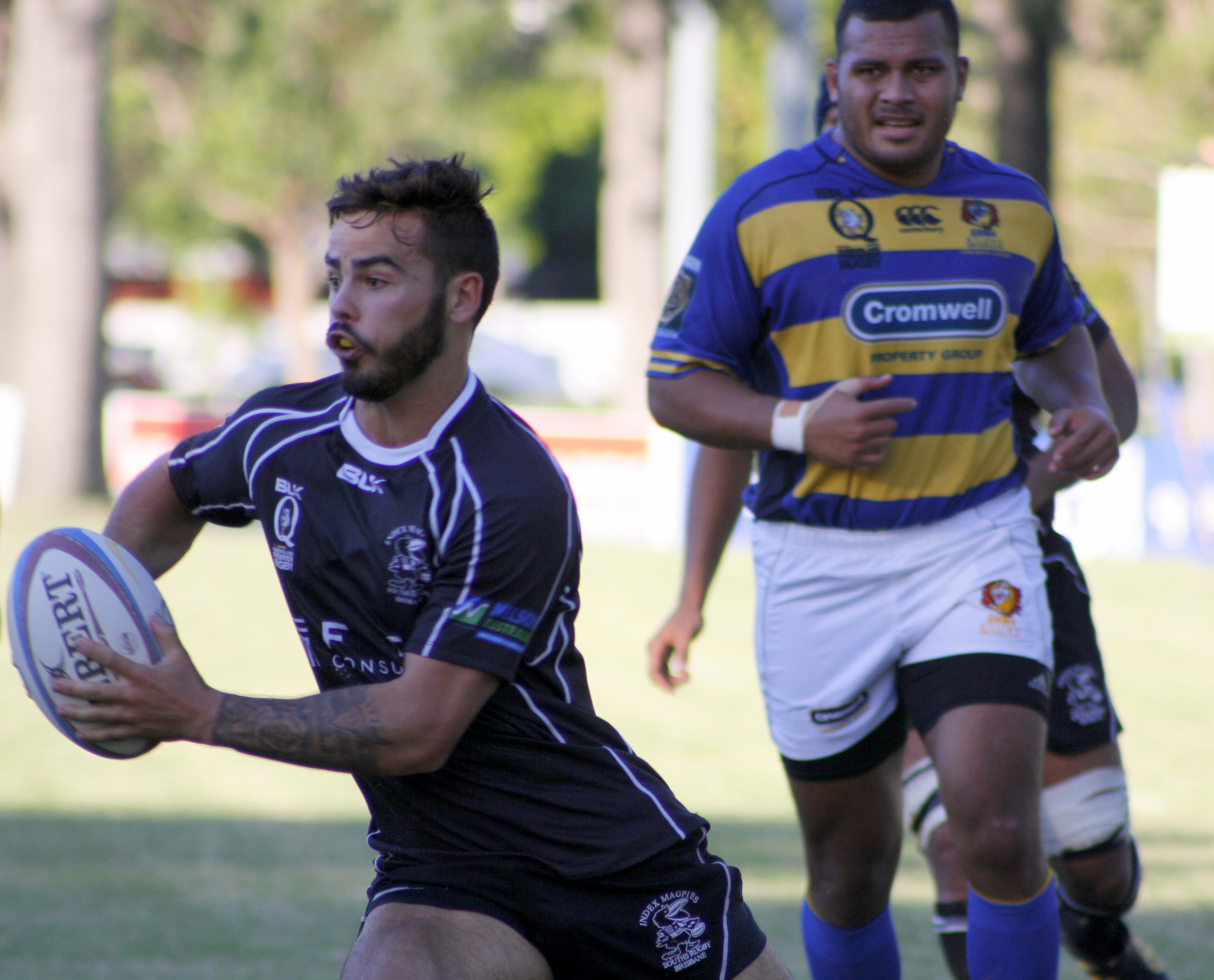
South's player, Andy Muirhead, with the ball vs. East's at Bottomley Park, 11 April 2015

== Queensland Premier Rugby results ==
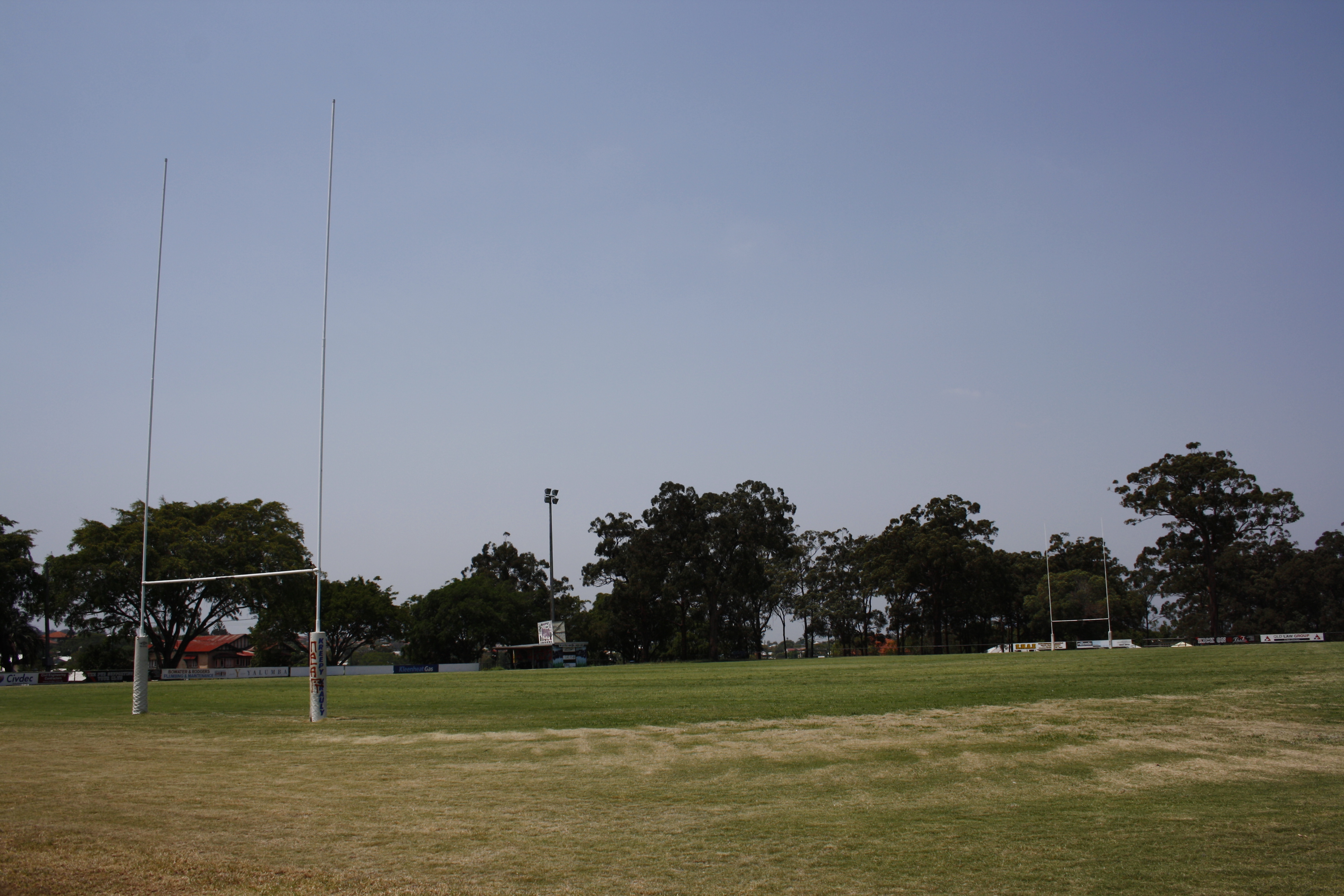
Souths Rugby is located at Chipsy Wood Oval (pictured) within Yeronga Memorial Park.

Queensland Premier Rugby

Premiers, Hospital Cup Premierships (Hospital Cup)

Year	Premiers	Score	Runners-up
1958	Souths	9–5	University
1986	Souths	31–13	Brothers
1991	Souths	22–15	Wests
1992	Souths	44–10	University
1993	Souths	27–8	Sunnybank
1994	Souths	19–8	Sunnybank
1995	Souths	27–11	Easts
1998	Souths	34–18	Wests
2000	Souths	34–30	Wests
2015	Souths	39–12	Easts

Queensland Premier Rugby

Runners-up, (Vince Nicholls Memorial Trophy)

Year	Premiers	Score	Runners-up
1955	University	18–6	Souths
1957	University	23–18	Souths
1962	University	18–12	Souths
1980	Brothers	19–0	Souths
1987	Brothers	20–19	Souths
1988	University	18–10	Souths
1989	University	34–9	Souths
1996	GPS	12–6	Souths
1997	Easts	18–16	Souths
2009	Brothers	26–19	Souths

== Australian Club Championship results ==
Australian Club Championship

Premiers, Club Championship years

Year	Premiers	Score	Runners-up
1987	Souths	13–10	Parramatta

Australian Club Championship

Runners-up, Club Championship years

Year	Premiers	Score	Runners-up
1991	Randwick	35–12	Souths
2016	Eastwood	34–17	Souths

== Honours ==
Queensland Premier Rugby – Premiers: (10) 1958, 1986, 1991, 1992, 1993, 1994, 1995, 1998, 2000, 2015
Queensland Premier Rugby – Runners-up: (10) 1955, 1957, 1962, 1980, 1987, 1988, 1989, 1996, 1997, 2009
Australian Club Championship – Premiers: (1) 1987
Australian Club Championship – Runners-up: (2) 1991, 2016

== Internationals ==
- Neil Betts
- Nev Cottrell
- Brian Ford
- G McLean
- Alec Evans
- David Codey
- Andrew Slack
- Tom Lawton, Jr
- Rob Lawton
- Richard Tombs
- Dan Crowley
- Tim Horan
- Jason Little
- Sam Scott-Young
- Garrick Morgan
- Troy Coker
- Damien Smith
- Brett Johnstone
- Barry Lea
- Adrian Skeggs
- Brett Robinson
- Michael Foley
- Mark Connors
- Toutai Kefu
- Steve Kefu
- Tyron Mandrusiak
- Quade Cooper
- Saia Fainga'a
- Anthony Fainga'a
- Kurt Morath
- Beau Robinson
- Albert Vulivuli
- Samu Kerevi
- Lukhan Salakaia-Loto

== See also ==
- Queensland Premier Rugby
- Rugby union in Queensland
- Brisbane Junior Rugby union
