= Alec Evans =

- Born: Alexander Evans; 1939 (age 86–87) Brisbane, Australia

Rugby union career
- Position(s): Lock, Prop
Provincial / State sides
Years	Team	Apps	(Points)
1959–69, 1973	Queensland	62	
Coaching career
- Years: Team
- 1984–85: Wests Brisbane
- ?: Souths Brisbane
- 1992–95: Cardiff RFC
- 1995: Wales
- 2004: Gold Coast Breakers

Alec Evans (born 1939) is an Australian former rugby union footballer and coach. Known as Alex Evans in the United Kingdom, he coached Wales at the 1995 Rugby World Cup. He was assistant coach of Australia on the 1984 Grand Slam tour. Evans was a representative player for Queensland for more than a decade, and the Alec Evans Medal is now awarded annually for the Queensland Premier Rugby player of the year.

== Playing career ==
Evans played for Queensland over 11 consecutive seasons from 1959 to 1969, including as captain, and in 1973 at the age of 34. Going from Souths first grade into the Queensland line-up in 1959 at age 20, Evans played a total of 62 games for his State. This record was unsurpassed until Queensland started playing teams from outside of Australia on a regular basis.

He won Wallabies selection when picked to tour New Zealand in 1962, but contracted glandular fever and did not get to play a game. A tough and loyal player, Evans left the field with a dislocated shoulder in the 1965 match against South Africa in Brisbane, only to return to finish it moments later with his arm strapped to his side.

== Coaching ==
On retiring from playing, he became a coach of international renown. As a coach he was credited as being the unsung hero of the 1984 Grand Slam Wallabies tour of the UK, the first Wallabies side to return with victories over all four home nations. Evans, although having a Welsh name, later became the first non-Welshman to coach Wales. While head coach at Cardiff RFC, Evans was appointed caretaker coach of Wales in 1995 following the departure of Alan Davies, but he couldn't avoid the elimination of Wales at the 1st round of the 1995 Rugby World Cup finals.

Following his coaching days at Cardiff RFC, Evans coached Gordon RFC in Sydney's Shute Shield before joining the Queensland Reds as Scrum Technical Advisor. In 2007, he joined the Australian coaching team as technical advisor in preparation for their 2007 Rugby World Cup campaign. He coached three Queensland clubs to Hospital Cup premierships (Wests, Souths, Gold Coast Breakers), as well as being in constant demand as a mentor for any number of school and club sides. Evans finished his career as an assistant coach to Queensland's Super Rugby winning team of 2011.

== Legacy ==
In 2010, Evans was honoured with a Queensland Service to Sport Award for the invaluable contribution he has made to the game of rugby. The Alec Evans Medal is awarded annually for Queensland's Premier Rugby player of the year.
