= North Brisbane Rugby Club =

Australian rugby union club

North Brisbane
- Full name: North Brisbane Rugby Club
- Union: Queensland Rugby Union
- Nickname: Eagles
- Founded: 1991; 1933 (Teachers College)
- Location: Shaw Rd, Wooloowin
- Ground: Hugh Courtney Oval (Capacity: 5,000)
- President: Shaun McKinnon
- Coach: Dan Ritchie
- Captain: Harry Langbridge
- League: Queensland Premier Rugby
- 2024: 7th
Team kit

Official website
- northsrugbyclub.com/about-us/

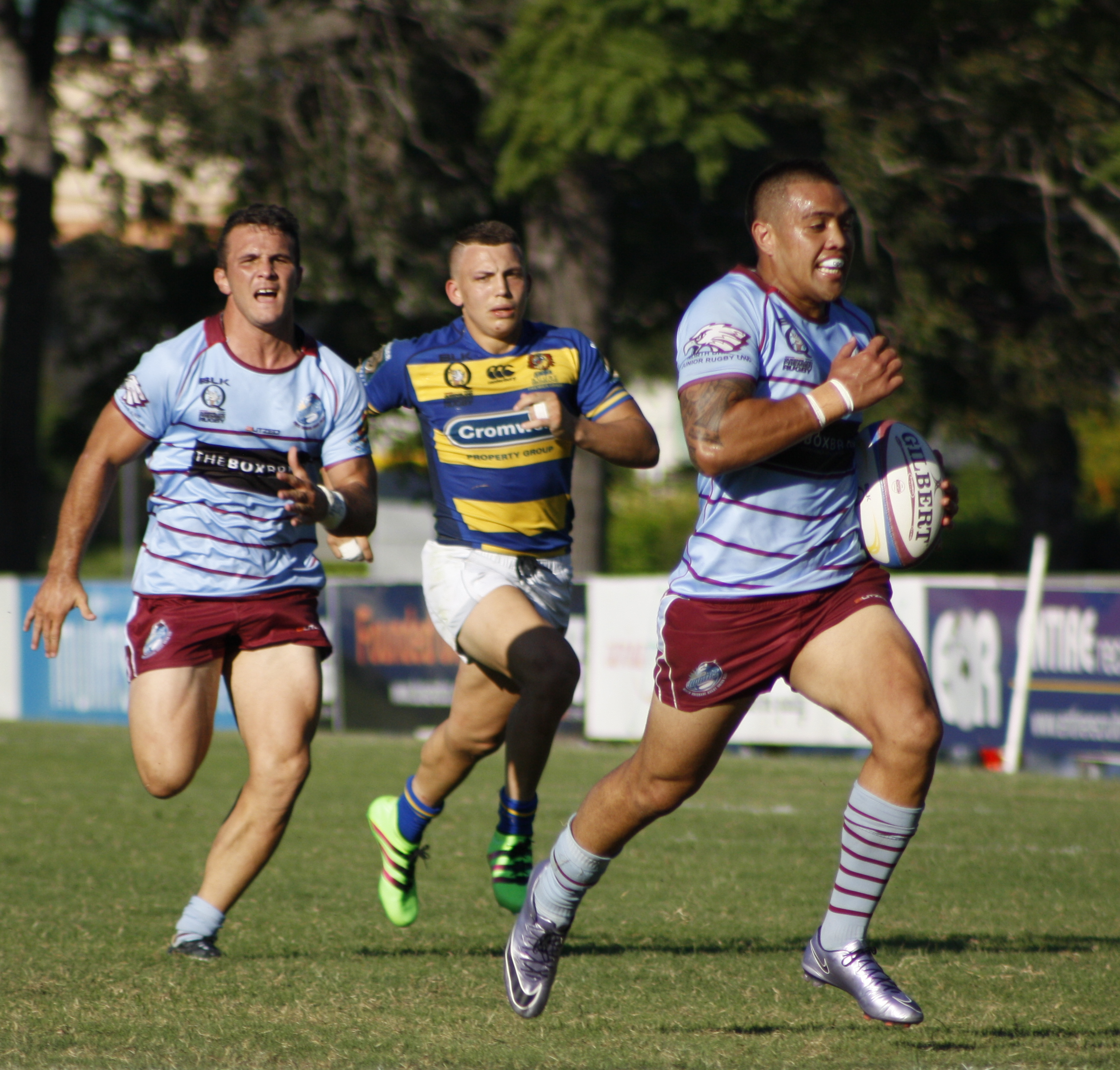
Norths in possession against Easts (2016).

North Brisbane Rugby Club or Norths is an Australian rugby union club. The club plays in the Queensland Premier Rugby competition, and fields teams for males and females in several other grades and age-group competitions.

North Brisbane has undergone several mergers and name changes since being founded in 1933 as the Teachers Rugby Club. The club has won two Premierships; in 1963 (as Teachers), and in 1976 (as Teachers-Norths).

== History ==
In the 1930s, the North Brisbane area was represented by the Eagle Junction Rugby Football Club, which was founded in 1931 and then promoted to first grade for the 1935 season after starting in the lower grades of the Brisbane competition. The club went on win four first grade Premierships from 1935 to 1938. Eagle Junction merged with the original Northern Districts club in 1952, and was rebranded as the Northern Districts Rugby Football Club and continued to play in first grade until 1955, but went back to the lower grades and ultimately disappeared from the Brisbane club rugby scene in 1960.

The Teachers Training College Football Club played in the Brisbane Rugby League from 1927 in the lower grades until the end of the 1932 season. The club left the BRL competition and affiliated with the Queensland Rugby Union at the QRU Executive meeting on 21 March 1933.

With the Army Rugby Club dropping out of the "A" Grade competition in 1960, there was an opportunity to promote the Teachers Training College Club to the Brisbane first grade competition in 1961 and maintain the 7 team competition format. The club's first "A" Grade Premiership was won in 1963.

Hugh Courtney, then Principal of the College, maintained Teachers Rugby Club throughout the 60s and the early 70s. In 1974, Teachers amalgamated with the third club to use the Northern Districts name (founded in 1966) to become the Teachers-Norths Rugby Club. Teachers-Norths enjoyed a successful decade in the 1970s, winning the Premiership in 1976.

From 1976 to 1982, Teachers-Norths was very competitive, with at least five Wallabies players in the team. The club contested all finals series during this period, and reached the Grand Final in 1981. But the nature of the teaching profession resulted in a large turn-over of players, with teachers graduating and moving away to take up positions outside Brisbane. By 1984, when Teachers-Norths moved to their present club facilities at Shaw Rd, the fortunes of the club were in decline.

In 1991, Teachers-Norths merged again; this time with Redcliffe Rugby Club (founded in 1969) to become the North Brisbane Rugby Club. Norths had a name change to the Brisbane Barbarians Rugby Club for a brief period in the late 90s, but reverted to North Brisbane Rugby Club for the 1999 season.

In 2001, Norths formed an alliance with Queensland University of Technology and became known as Norths-QUT, but the university moved away from an emphasis on sport and Norths decided to sever the alliance in 2008 to stand alone as the North Brisbane Rugby Club.

Chris Roche, a former Wallaby, and star player for Teachers-Norths during the 1970s and 1980s, became the club's Coaching Director in 2005. He fostered a strong relationship with players from Papua New Guinea and recruited many players of PNG heritage to the club, including Wallaby Will Genia, who elected to join his brother, Frank, at Norths in 2009. Currently, Norths has two contracted Queensland Reds players in former All Black, Jeffrey Toomaga-Allen and Norths Junior, Will McCulloch.

== Premiership finals results ==
TEACHERS COLLEGE (1933–73)

Premiers (Hospital Challenge Cup)

- 1963 Teachers 28 def. University 9

Runners-Up (Vince Nicholls Memorial Trophy)

- 1964 University 29 def Teachers 9

TEACHERS-NORTHS (1974–90)

Premiers (Hospital Challenge Cup)

- 1976 Teachers-Norths 16 def. GPS 4

Runners-Up (Vince Nicholls Memorial Trophy)

- 1981 Brothers 36 def. Teachers-Norths 13

NORTH BRISBANE (1991–present)

Premiers (Hospital Challenge Cup)

- NIL

Runners-Up (Vince Nicholls Memorial Trophy)

- NIL

== Representative players ==
Norths players who have represented the Wallabies include: Dick Marks, John Cornes, Geoff Richardson, Laurie Lawrence, Rod Hauser, Greg Cornelsen, Tom Barker, Peter Horton, Michael O'Connor, Chris Roche, and Will Genia.

In addition, a number of players distinguished themselves at Queensland State level, including Greg Dux, Damien Barker, Peter Trehern, Michael Want and Nev Cottrell.

Chris Roche was the first person in the history of the Rothmans Medal (the forerunner to the XXXX Medal) to win the medal twice. Nev Cottrell from Norths also was a winner of this award.

Three Norths Players have been named in the top 100 Wallabies of all time, being Greg Cornelsen, Michael O'Connor and Chris Roche.

As of 2018, Norths have four contracted players in Queensland Reds Super Rugby Squad: Karmichael Hunt, Duncan Paia'aia, Kane Douglas and Reece Hewat. Two other players, Nick Jooste and Tony Hunt, also spent the majority of the 2018 preseason with the Reds.

== See also ==
- Queensland Premier Rugby
- Rugby union in Queensland
