= Bill Monti =

Australia international rugby union player

- Born: Carrabo Italo Ansell Monti; 30 June 1914 Richmond River, New South Wales
- Died: c. 1977
- School: St Joseph's College, Hunters Hill

Rugby union career
Amateur team(s)
Years	Team	Apps	(Points)
- University of Queensland Rugby Club
Provincial / State sides
Years	Team	Apps	(Points)
1937	Queensland		
International career
Years	Team	Apps	(Points)
1938	Australia	1	(0)

Carrabo Italo Ansell "Bill" Monti (30 June 1914 – 1977) was a rugby union player who represented Australia.

Monti was born in the Richmond River area of New South Wales and attended St Joseph's College, Hunters Hill. He played at lock in club rugby for the University of Queensland Rugby Club. He made his debut for Queensland in 1937. A year later he made his debut for the Wallabies, becoming the 320th player to do so and the eighth from the UQ rugby club. White only played one test, the second Bledisloe Cup match of 1938, where the All Blacks defeated Australia 20 points to 14.
