= Bruce Brown (rugby union) =

Australian rugby union international

- Full name: Bruce Robert Brown
- Born: 18 August 1944 (age 82) Brisbane, Australia

Rugby union career
- Position: Loosehead prop
International career
Years	Team	Apps	(Points)
1972	Australia	2	(0)

Bruce Robert Brown (born 18 August 1944) is an Australian former rugby union international.

Born in Brisbane, Brown was a loosehead prop who was educated at Brisbane Boys' College. He played for the University of Queensland Rugby Club and made his first Queensland appearance at age 20 in 1965.

Brown earned Wallabies selection in 1971 for a tour of France as a reserve prop, before gaining his two caps in New Zealand the following year. With David Dunworth out of the tour injured, Brown was preferred as his replacement for the 1st Test in Wellington. He lost his place to Jake Howard for the 2nd Test, but returned for the 3rd Test at Eden Park.

== See also ==
- List of Australia national rugby union players
