= University of Queensland Rugby Club =

University of Queensland
- Full name: University of Queensland Rugby Club
- Nickname(s): Uni; The Students; Red Heavies
- Founded: 1911; 115 years ago
- Location: St Lucia, Brisbane, Queensland, Australia
Team kit

Official website
- www.uqrugby.com

The University of Queensland Rugby Club is an Australian rugby club, based at the University of Queensland in Brisbane, Queensland. They currently compete in the Queensland Premier Rugby competition. They were formed in 1911, as rugby was adopted by the Sports Association at the University of Queensland as a major sport.

The University of Queensland Rugby Football Club, although recently incorporated, was founded in 1911. Since then the club has seen several thousands of young men and women enjoy the game of Rugby and develop many friendships.

The club is affiliated with the Queensland Rugby Union (QRU) which is one of the member unions of the Australian Rugby Union (ARU). The club is also affiliated with The University of Queensland and has a relationship with local junior club, the Kenmore Bears.

The University of Queensland Rugby Club provides an environment where excellence and academic achievements are encouraged and extolled. Throughout the years, the club has established a Rugby tradition of camaraderie, mateship and enjoyment which has significantly contributed to its ongoing success both on and off the field.

Many of the club's players have been rewarded with representative honours whilst others have further contributed to the game as coaches, managers or administrators. 215 University players have represented Queensland with 66 having been selected for Australia (7 as captain). In terms of elite coaches, the following have represented the Club at the highest level:

- Wallaby coaches: Bob Templeton and Jake Howard
- Queensland coaches: Mark McBain and Jeff Miller
- Other Super 14 coaches: David Nucifora

Past players including Norbert Byrne, David Crombie, Dick Marks, Leo Williams and David Usasz have also made a mark on the game with their time served on the Boards of the Queensland Rugby Union and/or the Australian Rugby Union whilst Steve Wilson is a current member of the QRU Board having joined in March 2006.

The club is located on The University of Queensland St Lucia campus where it has its own Clubhouse and the use of three illuminated fields. The club is administered by a committee of honorary members who are assisted by full-time staff and coaches.

The club's players were available for selection to the now defunct Australian Rugby Championship franchise Ballymore Tornadoes.

== Premiership Finals results ==
Premiers (33)

- 1928* University 10–7 Carlton
- 1929*^{†} University 12–11 Coorparoo
- 1930 University 12–3 Valleys
- 1931 University 16–15 GPS
- 1932 University 8–6 Brothers
- 1934 University 20–18 GPS
- 1938 University 14–3 Y.M.C.A.
- 1941 University 23–6 Brothers
- 1945 University 15–10 Brothers
- 1947 University 8–6 Brothers
- 1948 University 21–18 GPS
- 1952 University 11–3 Brothers
- 1954 University 19–3 GPS
- 1955 University 18–16 Souths
- 1956 University 19–6 GPS
- 1957 University 23–18 Souths
- 1960 University 11–6 Brothers
- 1962 University 18–12 Souths
- 1964 University 29–9 Teachers
- 1965 University 17–15 GPS
- 1967 University 17–15 GPS
- 1969 University 22–14 Brothers
- 1970 University 24–6 GPS
- 1979^{‡} University 16–13 Brothers
- 1988 University 18–10 Souths
- 1989 University 34–9 Souths
- 1990 University 19–10 Brothers
- 2010 University 19–11 Sunshine Coast
- 2012 University 46–20 Sunnybank
- 2014 University 20–18 Sunnybank
- 2017 University 23–14 GPS
- 2019 University 31–26 Brothers
- 2021 University 29–12 GPS

Runners-Up (24)

- 1919 Brothers 20–9 University
- 1933^{†} Y.M.C.A. 17–17 University
- 1939 Y.M.C.A. 15–8 University
- 1943 GPS 10–8 University
- 1949 Brothers 13–8 University
- 1950 Brothers 21–10 University
- 1953 Brothers 11–9 University
- 1958 Souths 9–5 University
- 1959 Brothers 13–11 University
- 1961 GPS 19–13 University
- 1963 Teachers 28–9 University
- 1966 Brothers 36–9 University
- 1968 Brothers 17–6 University
- 1972 GPS 23–18 University
- 1978 Brothers 19–15 University
- 1982 Brothers 25–16 University
- 1983 Brothers 30–15 University
- 1985 Wests 10–7 University
- 1992 Souths 44–10 University
- 2004 Gold Coast 24–18 University
- 2016 Brothers 31–28 University
- 2018 GPS 23–16 University
- 2020 Easts 33–18 University
- 2022 Wests 44–27 University

Notes

* University played in the Brisbane Rugby League premiership when the rugby union competition was disbanded from 1920 to 1927, and played both codes from 1928 to 1935.
† Challenge Final – Some competitions in the early 1900s included the right to challenge the winner of the Premiership Final if a club won the Minor premiership and did not win the Premiership Final. The resultant match was called the Challenge Final and was later called the Grand Final.
‡ The 1979 Grand Final was replayed after a 24–24 draw.

== National Club Champions ==
University have been the Australian club champions on two occasions (1990 and 2011).

== Rivalry with Brothers Rugby Club ==
The long tradition of clashes with Brothers first began in senior competition on 8 June 1912, with Brothers running out victors 24–0. The tradition of hard, close fought games between these two clubs remains a feature of the Brisbane club scene and there have been many memorable tussles over the years, particularly in grand finals. The most famous being the 24-all draw in 1979 that resulted in a rematch where University won 16–13 in a tight match. The latest bragging rights are with University after a 31–26 win in the 2019 final, the last time the teams have met in a grand final.

== U19 Colts ==
After great success in the early 2000s university colts dropped off the radar in 03 and 04 until 2005 when under the guidance of Andrew Tucker (Premier Director of Rugby) and the new appointments of Paul "Taffy Longman" (Head Colts Coach 05-06)and Rob Murdoch (Colts Assistant Coach 05-06) the club was able to recruit a forward pack with many state and national representatives. The club signed 6 starting QLD/ACT Representatives that played in front of a small but skilled back line. The 2005 premiership came after a landmark game against GPS in the semi-final, and a crushing win over brothers in the final.

In 2006 the club was pro-active in recruiting a number of Australian representatives and a high-profile New Zealand u19 representative. Indifferent form and injuries in the early part of the season had many critics claiming the uni boys could not retain their title, pressure to perform was high however the Uni Colts showed all the critics what sort of squad they were by taking the field for their remaining 8 fixtures and securing victories for all 8 in a row, successfully defending their 2005 title to be crowned 2006 premiers. Back to back premierships in the U19's was a fantastic result and one that uni had not seen for some time.

== Internationals ==
- Eric Francis
- Tom Lawton, Snr
- James Clark – past Wallaby captain
- Phil Clark
- Fred Whyatt
- Bill White
- Vay Wilson – past Wallaby captain
- Bill Monti
- Vaux Nicholson
- Clem Windsor
- Keith Winning – past Wallaby captain
- Conrad Primmer
- Lon Hatherell
- John O'Neill
- Ainslie Sheil
- Ken Donald
- Charles Wilson – past Wallaby captain
- Peter James
- Kerry Larkin
- Thomas Baxter
- Robert Potter
- Lloyd McDermott
- Dick Marks
- Jules Guerassimoff
- John Wolfe
- Ric Trivett
- Ross Teitzel
- Russell Manning
- David Crombie
- David Taylor
- Stuart Gregory
- Keith Bell
- Bruce Brown
- Mark Loane – past Wallaby captain
- Paddy Batch
- Bill Ross
- Geoff Shaw
- Duncan Hall
- Tony Parker
- Andy McIntyre
- Chris Roche
- Michael Lynagh – past Wallaby captain
- Jeff Miller
- Cameron Lillicrap
- Nigel Kassulke
- Michael Cook
- Greg Martin
- Brendon Nasser
- Mitchell Palm
- Peter Slattery
- David Nucifora
- Pat Howard
- Fletcher Dyson
- Nick Stiles
- Nathan Sharpe – past Wallaby captain
- Drew Mitchell
- Stephen Moore
- Josh Valentine
- James Horwill – Wallaby captain
- Mitchell Chapman
- Luke Morahan
- Rod Davies
- Mike Harris
- James Hanson
- Tate McDermott

- Tom Lynagh

== See also ==
- Rugby union in Queensland
- University of Queensland Union (UQU)
