= Quade Cooper =

Australia international rugby union player

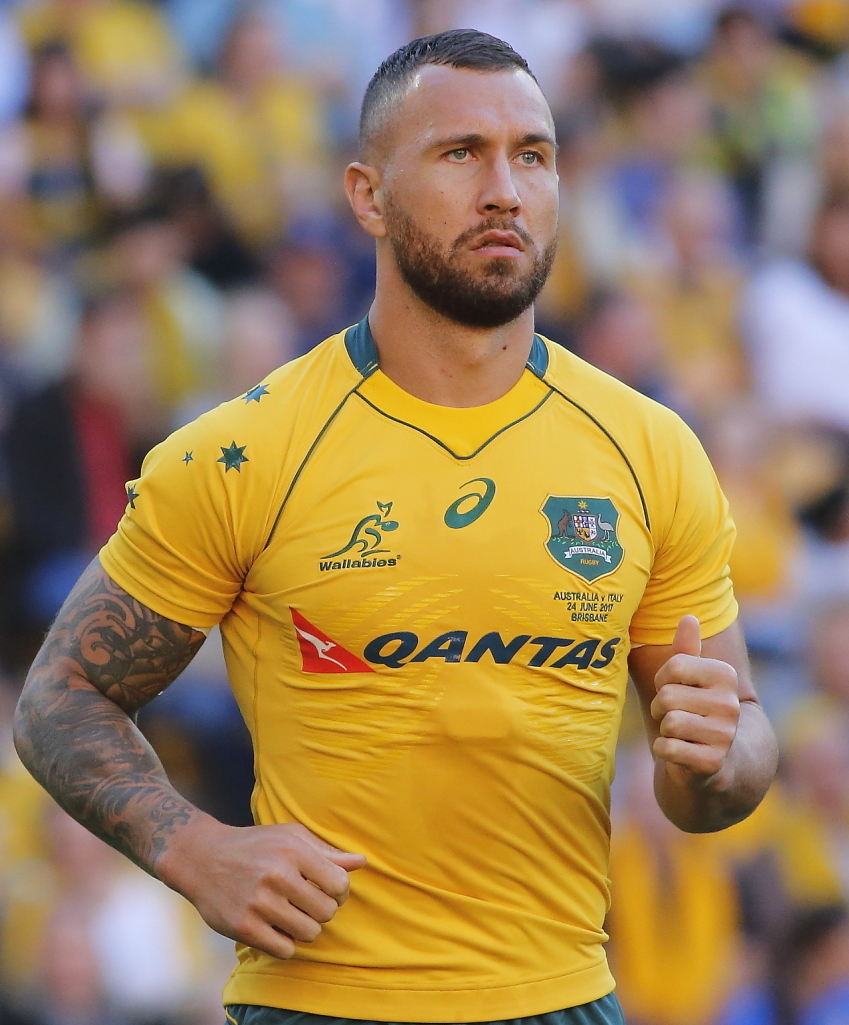
- Cooper with Australia in 2017
- Full name: Quade Santini Cooper
- Born: 5 April 1988 (age 38) Auckland, New Zealand
- Height: 186 cm (6 ft 1 in)
- Weight: 92 kg (203 lb; 14 st 7 lb)
- School: Anglican Church Grammar School
- Notable relatives: Sean Maitland (cousin); Cheyenne Campbell (cousin)

Rugby union career
- Position(s): Fly-half, Fullback, Centre
Youth career
- 2005–2006: Anglican Church Grammar School
Amateur team(s)
Years	Team	Apps	(Points)
2018	Souths	11	(57)
Senior career
Years	Team	Apps	(Points)
2006–2015	Reds	109	(768)
2007	East Coast Aces	3	(5)
2014–2018	Brisbane City	16	(142)
2015–2016	Toulon	15	(10)
2017	Reds	12	(79)
2019	Rebels	16	(116)
2019–2025	Kintetsu Liners	53	(411)
- Correct as of 22 February 2025
International career
Years	Team	Apps	(Points)
2005–2006	Australian Schoolboys	9	(0)
2008	Australia U20	5	(46)
2008–2023	Australia	80	(208)
- Correct as of 5 August 2023
National sevens team
Years	Team		Comps
2016	Australia		2
Coaching career
- Years: Team
- 2025–: Kintetsu Liners (attack coach)
Medal record
Men's rugby union
Representing Australia
Rugby World Cup
Silver medal – second place	2015 England	Squad
Bronze medal – third place	2011 New Zealand	Squad

Quade Santini Cooper (born 5 April 1988) is an Australian professional rugby union coach, former player, and former boxer. Although born in New Zealand, he has represented Australia in rugby at international level. Finishing his playing career with the Kintetsu Liners in Japan, Cooper established his career with the Queensland Reds in the Super Rugby. He went on to play for Toulon in the French Top 14 and also played for the Melbourne Rebels. His team position was fly-half, however Cooper was often deployed in the midfield earlier in his career, as well as fullback.

== Early life ==
Quade Santini Cooper was born in Auckland, New Zealand, on 5 April 1988. He has five siblings, three sisters, Shavarn, Georgie, and Pania and two brothers, Reuben and Moses. As a one-year-old Cooper moved to Tokoroa and was raised by his mother and step-father, Ruhia and David Jones. He attended Forest View High School before moving to Brisbane, Australia in 2001, at 13-years-old. In Brisbane, Cooper attended Rochedale State High School and Springwood State High School before being awarded a scholarship to Anglican Church Grammar School, where he excelled for their first XV rugby union team from 2005 till 2006. In the first year of his ascendance, his team tied for the Queensland GPS Premiership with Brisbane State High School in 2005.

Cooper played in all the age group rugby union and league sides in Waikato. He toured the United Kingdom as five-eighth or fullback with the Australian Schoolboys in 2005, alongside David Pocock and Lachie Turner. He rejoined the side in 2006, furthering his total caps to nine, which was the then equal schoolboy record. He also forced his way into the Reds' side as a teenager in 2006. Cooper was selected as a replacement against Japan at the National Stadium, Tokyo in November, winning 29–22.

== Career ==
=== 2007–09: Youth level and early international career ===
Cooper joined the ARU-funded high-performance program with the national talent squad, and signed with the Queensland Reds for the 2007 Super 14 season. At 18-years-old, Cooper made his debut appearance for the Reds in Round 2 of the competition, against the Crusaders at Jade Stadium, Christchurch. The Reds went on to lose the game by eleven points. Unfortunately, the franchise finished bottom of the table, having won just two of 13 games. It saw head coach Eddie Jones resign after an 89-point defeat by the Bulls. It was later unveiled Cooper would be the first five-eighth for one of the two Queensland teams, the East Coast Aces in the inaugural Australian Rugby Championship. The side was guided by former Samoa coach John Boe and Australian lock Garrick Morgan.

It was reported by The Sunday Mail early 2008 that the New Zealand Rugby Union showed interest and had held preliminary talks with Cooper's management team after he would be off contract at season's end with Queensland. It was understood the Hurricanes were in line for his signature, and including a possible defection to rugby league. Cooper was involved in a famous upset five-tries-to-one victory over the Bulls. Head coach Phil Mooney made six changes to the side that started against the Stormers the previous week, which earned Cooper's first start of the 2008 season. Cooper performed a try assist after a chip kick to Morgan Turinui in the 72nd minute, securing their first bonus-point victory in four years.

Cooper was amongst seven Super 14 players included in the Australian national under-20 side after coach Brian Melrose confirmed the team naming for the inaugural 2008 IRB Junior World Championships in June. Cooper impressed, coming third in most conversions converted behind Francois Brummer and Trent Renata of New Zealand. Australia had the youngest and heaviest squad in the tournament. After receiving age-grade honors, Cooper was later selected for Australia in their 2008 end-of-year tour campaign. He made his international test debut against Italy, as a substitute back. Cooper scored a late try to help Australia to a victory over Italy in Padova, with eight minutes remaining. He made another further two replacement appearances against France and Wales before playing in the historic match against the Barbarian F.C. at Wembley Stadium. It marked the celebration of Australia winning the rugby gold medal at the 1908 London Olympics. Cooper was involved in a touchline fight between Federico Pucciariello after tussling into the advertising boards and needed to be separated by colleagues and verbally warned by referee Chris White.

National Rugby League (NRL) clubs and NZRU officials came up unsuccessful in attempting to sign Cooper in 2009. The New Zealand Rugby Union showed interest in luring him back to New Zealand as they faced a possible loss of New Zealand international first five-eighth Dan Carter. Cooper instead re-signed with Australia and the Reds. After repeating another near bottom of the table finish, Cooper was one of just four players and the only member of the backline to appear in all thirteen matches during the Reds 2009 Super 14 campaign. He scored four tries, which was second only to Digby Ioane among the team's leading try-scorers. The season also saw the Reds suffer a historic seventh loss from seven matches away to the Highlanders, and was their 22nd loss in 23 visits to New Zealand since 1999.

Cooper gained his first test start, playing at second five-eighth, during the final test against Italy in Melbourne during the 2009 June series. He went on to feature eight times for Australia, starting all four tests on the Grand Slam tour from the second five-eighth position. Cooper stood out on tour and earned praise from former Welsh great Barry John after a victory over Wales at Millennium Stadium.

=== 2010–12: Super Rugby championship and World Cup ===
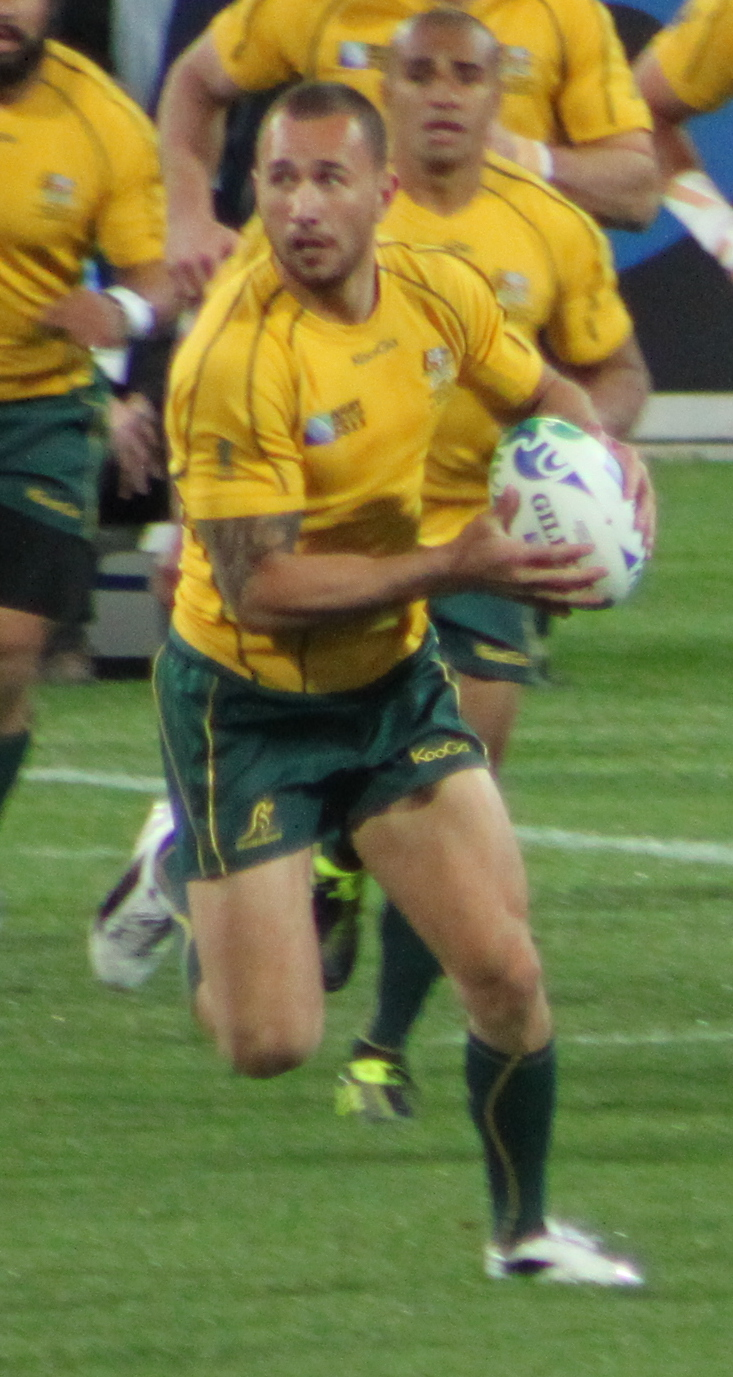
Cooper playing for Australia in 2011

Playing at fly-half in the Wallabies' 1st Tri-Nations Series Test against South Africa, Cooper was yellow-carded during the game for a dangerous tackle on Morne Steyn. Later he was suspended from two Tests against New Zealand, the Bledisloe Cup clashes in Melbourne and Christchurch. He returned from suspension to face South Africa in Pretoria and Bloemfontein. He featured in the final Tri-Nations clash against the All Blacks in a 22–23 loss at ANZ Stadium in Sydney. Cooper took part in all of the Wallabies' Spring Tour games, playing at flyhalf.

In 2011 Cooper signed with player agent Khoder Nasser. In 2011, the Queensland Reds won the inaugural Super Rugby title, with Cooper featuring prominently and kicking most of their goals.

Cooper played in all of the Wallabies' Tri-Nations games. When James O'Connor was suspended from the deciding Tri-Nations test at Suncorp Stadium against the All Blacks, Cooper took over the kicking duties in a 25–20 win, securing Australia's only Tri-Nations title since 2001 in the final edition of the competition. During that match, Cooper started a brawl after striking New Zealand captain Richie McCaw in the face with his knee.

Cooper was selected for the Wallabies for Rugby World Cup 2011 in New Zealand, where he played all but one of Australia's matches, starting all games at flyhalf.

Cooper was selected for the third-place playoff at Eden Park against Wales. Cooper set up the opening try before succumbing to an anterior cruciate ligament (ACL) injury that later ruled him out of the opening rounds of the Reds' title defence in the 2012 Super Rugby season.

In mid-2012, while recovering from the knee injury, Cooper signed a three-year deal to stay with the Reds through to 2015. Cooper's return from the injury came in Round 13 of the 2012 Super Rugby season against the Lions.

In Round 18, Cooper was yellow-carded and placed on report for a high tackle on former Reds and current Wallabies teammate Berrick Barnes. Cooper was later given a one-week suspension, causing him to miss the elimination-final against the Sharks, which the Reds lost 17–30.

In December 2012, Cooper agreed to a two-year contract extension with the ARU.

=== 2013–15: International return and going abroad ===
In 2013, Cooper played in all of the Reds' Super Rugby games. After the sacking of Deans as Wallabies coach and his replacement by former Reds coach Ewen McKenzie, Cooper made his first Wallabies appearance after a long absence in the first test of the 2013 Rugby Championship, coming off the bench for the final 20 minutes in a losing effort against the All Blacks. He featured in the starting 15 at flyhalf for the rest of the Rugby Championship.

In the Wallabies clash with the All Blacks at Forsyth Barr Stadium in Dunedin on 19 October, Cooper six goals from six attempts, an additional drop goal, made three try-saving tackles and two line-breaks, and set up a try for teammate Adam Ashley-Cooper.

At the end of October, Cooper was named as vice-captain for the Cook Cup test against England. Under coach Ewen McKenzie he featured in all of the Wallabies' European autumn tour games.

On 7 March 2014, Cooper broke Elton Flatley's record of 629 points, as well as the all-time Queensland Red's point-scoring record in the Reds' 43–33 win over South Africa's Cheetahs at Suncorp Stadium.

On 5 May 2014, Cooper received his 100th Super Rugby cap for the Reds in a match against the Auckland Blues at Eden Park. On 17 May, he was ruled out for the rest of the Super Rugby season following a shoulder injury against the Melbourne Rebels in round 14. He later underwent shoulder and hip surgery. After recovering from his injury, Cooper was named in the Wallabies' 32-man squad for the third Bledisloe Cup match against New Zealand at Suncorp Stadium.

Cooper was selected to represent Australia at the 2015 Rugby World Cup. However, in contrast to the 2011 Rugby World Cup where he featured in all but one of Australia's matches, Cooper's sole appearance at the 2015 Rugby World Cup was in Australia's 65–3 win over Uruguay in the group stages, with Bernard Foley selected as Australia's starting fly-half for the tournament.

On 21 April 2015, it was rumoured that Cooper had committed to a two-year deal with French Top 14 side Toulon. In July 2015 it was revealed that Cooper had turned down the deal and re-committed to the ARU in order to be part of the Rio 2016 sevens team.

On 3 November, Cooper was 'unveiled' to the media as a member of the RC Toulon roster for the 2015–16 season. Cooper apologised to the Toulon fanbase for "extended negotiations" allowing him to be released if called to the Australian Sevens team for the Olympics. Cooper joined former Wallaby teammates Matt Giteau and Drew Mitchell, James O'Connor and Sales Ma'afu at the French club. In his debut against Montpellier, Cooper helped set up multiple tries.

=== 2016–18: Sevens stint and dropped from Reds ===
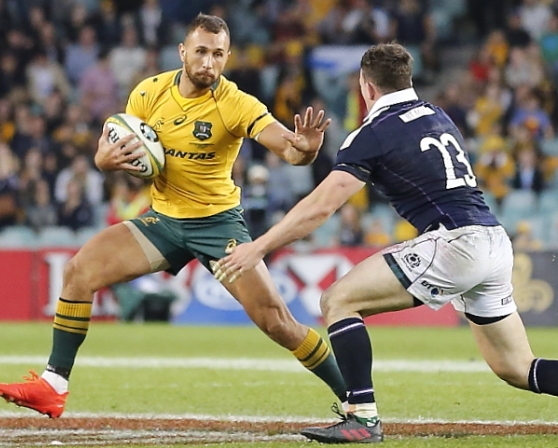
Cooper using a stiff-arm fend against Scotland in 2017

Cooper joined the Australian 7s squad in the lead-up to the 2016 Olympic Games, commencing with the Sydney leg of the World Rugby Sevens Series. Cooper scored his first try in sevens for Australia on 6 March 2016 in the team's 36–7 win against England. However, Cooper was later dropped from the squad in May 2016. Cooper claimed he was dropped because he did not hold an Australian passport at the time as citizenship of a country is required to represent that country in an Olympics.

Cooper returned to the Queensland Reds for the 2017 Super Rugby season after a brief time away playing club rugby for Toulon and Rugby sevens for Australia in 2016. He played twelve of the fifteen 2017 Super Rugby games and scored seventy four points, playing as a first choice fly-half. Cooper was selected for the Wallabies squad for the June tests against Fiji, Scotland and Italy, with Bernard Foley preferred in the starting role. The two wins and upset loss against Scotland would become Cooper's last appearance in a test jersey until 2021 as he was snubbed by Cheika for the 2017 Spring Tour, instead being selected to captain Alan Jones' Barbarians FC side, managing a free-flowing style of football which caught the Wallabies by surprise, the Wallabies would go on to claim a narrow 31–28 victory in Sydney.

In late 2017 it was reported that Cooper was dropped by the Reds before the start of the 2018 season. It was revealed new head coach Brad Thorn told Cooper that "he was the fifth-choice fly-half and was no longer part of his plans" for the franchise and would not be needed at training. It was suggested that Cooper would be playing club rugby for current club Souths. The Reds, under Thorn then signed two of Cooper's 2011 championship teammates flyhalf/fullback Jono Lance and utility back Ben Lucas. Meanwhile, Cooper spent the majority of 2018 playing for Souths, captaining the Queensland Premier Rugby side to a knockout semi-final in August 2018.

In 2018, Cooper and former Reds teammates Karmichael Hunt and James Slipper were named in a 36-man squad selection for NRC side Brisbane City. The three would go on to be signed with rival Super Rugby franchises for the following season, Cooper at the Rebels would go on to defeat Thorn's Reds twice, as would Hunt with the Waratahs, while Slipper at the Brumbies would lose to the Reds in Brisbane however, win at home in Canberra.

=== 2019–25: Melbourne Rebels and Kintetsu Liners ===
On 23 October, it was announced that Cooper had signed a one-year contract with the Melbourne Rebels, being sought out by Rebels coach Dave Wessels. After a hot start to the season, Rebels had a poorer back end and finished 11th overall, missing out on a finals wild card spot. On a personal front, Cooper's Rebels did manage two wins both home and away over the Queensland Reds coached by Brad Thorn who had "banished" Cooper from his home franchise. Subsequently, Cooper was notably absent from Wallabies squads for the test season with Lealiifano expectedly ahead of him given the Brumbies run to the finals, however Michael Cheika preferred Waratahs Bernard Foley and Kurtley Beale as backup options ahead of him as well as Rebels teammate Matt To'omua, who interestingly rarely featured at flyhalf for the Rebels or Leicester. Cheika's Wallabies would go on to bomb out of the World Cup in the quarter-finals after some shaky performances in the pool stages.

On 11 July 2019, following the end of the 2019 Super Rugby season, Cooper, alongside long-time teammate Will Genia, were announced as Japanese second division club Kintetsu Liners' latest signings ahead of the 2019–20 Top Challenge League season. At the time of his transfer, the Kintetsu Liners had not been in the first division since the 2017–18 season. In a 2025 interview, his last season as a professional rugby player, Cooper stated that he had no intention of moving to Japan at the time of his transfer, and that he wanted to remain in Australia. However, also admitted that the move was "the best thing for me." Months later in September 2019, Kintetsu Group Holdings, the parent company of the Kintetsu Liners, and Cooper's former club, the Melbourne Rebels, entered into a two-year player and coaching exchange agreement. The arrangement also preserved the possibility of Cooper returning to the Rebels at a later stage.

Across 2019 and 2021, which had been hampered by the COVID-19 pandemic, Cooper played 14 games for the Liners, including two in the 2021 Top League, which had been restructured to include second division teams at the latter end of the season.

In 2021, prior to the first test of the Bledisloe Cup, rumours had circled that Cooper would be called into the Wallabies squad a result of Australia's COVID restrictions and lack of form among the Australian flyhalves during the Super Rugby AU and Trans Tasman season. On July 25, it was formally announced that Cooper was named in the squad, alongside former Reds teammate Duncan Paia'aua as newcomers to Dave Rennie's test setup. In round 4 of the 2021 Rugby Championship, Cooper was selected by Rennie to start at his preferred flyhalf ahead of incumbent Lolesio, who was absent from the matchday 23 altogether. This would be Cooper's first appearance in 1541 days, his last cap being a 15-minute stint off the bench against Italy in Brisbane. Cooper scored 23 out of 28 points, with a perfect 8 from 8 attempts at goal, including a 43m penalty goal at the death to beat the Springboks 28–26.

In 2022, Cooper led the Liners to promotion to the first division after successfully defeating the Sagamihara DynaBoars across two legs. It was the first time in five years the team had played in the top division of Japanese rugby. Cooper was later awarded the Player of the Season honour.

Cooper announced he would be leaving the Liners at the end of the 2024–25 season. Despite not being an active player, Cooper stated in 2026 that he "never retired" and he found "interest" in the prospect of playing at the 2027 Rugby World Cup.

== Coaching career ==
In July 2025, having been inactive following his departure from the Kintetsu Liners, Cooper, alongside long-time teammate Will Genia, was announced as the attack coach for the Liners ahead of their 2025–26 season. Despite not winning promotion to the first division, Cooper was confirmed as the teams attack coach going into 2026–27, although Genia departed the club. In a 2026 interview, Cooper, reflecting on his past season of coaching, stated: "One thing that coaching has allowed me is the opportunity to put some of your thoughts into play. As a player, it doesn't matter how important you are to the team. Whether you're the halfback, flyhalf, the captain or whatever, in the game, you're still just completing someone else's game plan." Adding: "So it's afforded me the opportunity to go and say, 'OK, well I see the game like this. Now, let me go and build this and see where the holes are in that, where the upside is into the way that I thought that the best way to play the game'. So it gives you a different vantage point. It gives you a perspective that I never had before."

== Rugby league ==
Cooper grew up playing rugby league with Shaun Kenny-Dowall and considered joining the National Rugby League (NRL)'s Melbourne Storm in 2008. In August 2010 Cooper was rumoured to be considering a switch to rugby league and playing for the Parramatta Eels in the 2011 NRL season. This would have meant Cooper sacrificing his Wallabies' position. A figure of $850,000 was speculated, and Parramatta reportedly offered Cooper $1.5 million over three years. The issue was resolved in September when Cooper signed a one-year deal with the Australian Rugby Union. He said, even though he found the Parramatta offer flattering, he still saw his future in rugby union. For 2011 he wanted to continue with the Reds, and hoped to continue with the Wallabies and represent Australia at the 2011 Rugby World Cup.

Following the restructuring of the National Rugby League due to the COVID-19 pandemic in early 2020, Cooper was reported to be a prospect for various clubs on a short-term deal if he were to get the approval of his contracted club, the Kintetsu Liners. Cooper had returned to Australia in January and considered asking his club for permission to explore a short-term NRL deal before the June 30 deadline. Cooper also admitted that playing in the NRL was a dream since his youth. It was reported in late April 2020 that Cooper did not get approval to play in the NRL from his club, and any contract offer from NRL clubs would not be near the almost A$1 million dollar contract he was on in Japan.

== Boxing career ==
Quade Cooper
Personal information
- Nationality: Australia
- Weight: Cruiserweight

Boxing career
- Stance: Orthodox

Boxing record
- Total fights: 3
- Wins: 3
- Win by KO: 3

Cooper boxed on the undercard of friend Sonny Bill Williams' bout on 8 February 2013. He fought as a cruiserweight against Muay Thai veteran Barry Dunnett, winning by first-round knockout.

On 29 January 2014, Cooper fought 40-year-old Warren Tresidder on the undercard of the Anthony Mundine bout in Brisbane. Tresidder had 25 years of cage fighting experience at the time. Cooper won with a 4th-round TKO.

On 31 January 2015, Cooper was due to fight on the undercard of Sonny Bill Williams's bout against Chauncy Welliver. However, he was later forced to pull out.

=== Professional boxing record ===
3 fights	3 wins	0 losses
By knockout	3	0

No.	Result	Record	Opponent	Type	Round, time	Date	Location	Notes
3	Win	3–0	(Australia) Jack McInnes	TKO	2 (4), 2:39	3 February 2017	Adelaide Oval, Adelaide, Australia	
2	Win	2–0	(Australia) Warren Tresidder	TKO	4 (4), 0:34	29 January 2014	Entertainment Centre, Brisbane, Australia	Fought before 2014 Super Rugby season.
1	Win	1–0	(Australia) Barry Dunnett	KO	1 (4), 2:59	8 February 2013	Entertainment Centre, Brisbane, Australia	Professional debut

== Personal life ==
Cooper is the cousin of Scotland international player and 2013 British & Irish Lion Sean Maitland and is the cousin of Cheyenne Campbell. Cooper has previously been in high-profile relationships, most notably swimmer Stephanie Rice and Miss Universe Australia titleholder Laura Dundovic from 2015 until 2020.

=== Controversies ===
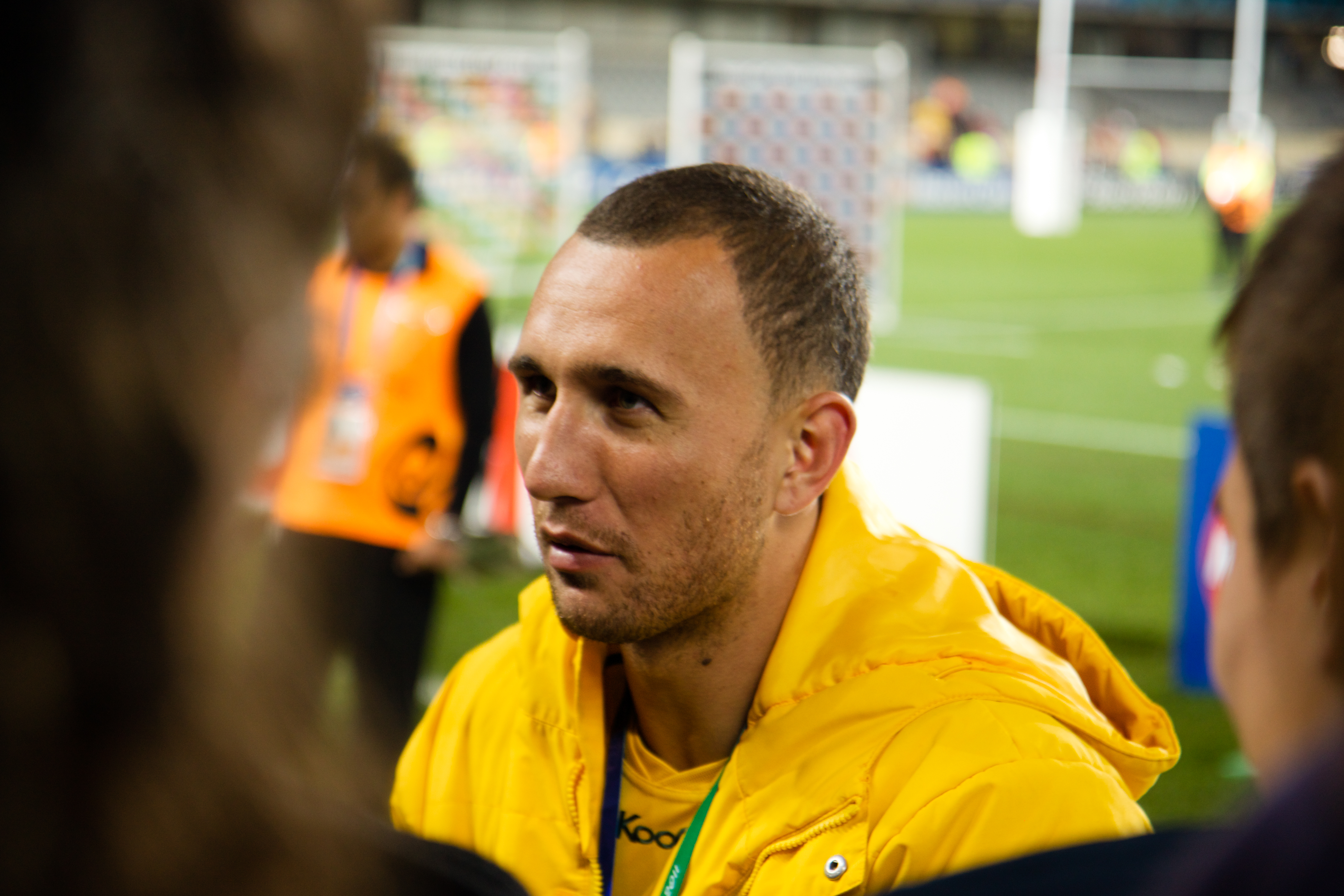
Cooper in 2011

In December 2009, Cooper was charged with burglary after allegedly taking two laptops from a residence on the Gold Coast, Queensland. The charges were withdrawn after mediation with the complainants.

In August 2011, Cooper was accused of deliberately kneeing New Zealand loose forward Richie McCaw in the face, after McCaw had targeted Cooper off the ball during the 2011 Tri Nations Test between Australia and New Zealand. A subsequent SANZAR judicial hearing in Brisbane dismissed the charge.

In September 2012, Cooper tweeted comments on the Wallabies' personnel set-up, which included criticising the defensive style and lack of player input under coach Robbie Deans, as well as inadequate training and recovery facilities, and a "toxic environment". He also said he would not play for the Wallabies under those conditions. As a result, Cooper was fined a record A$60,000 (of which A$20,000 was a two-year suspended sentence) and given a suspended three-match Wallabies ban. It was thought that the incident would prompt Cooper to abandon Australian rugby. However, he later recommitted to the Reds and ARU.

=== Australian citizenship ===
In May 2016, Cooper stated that he had been dropped from the Australian Sevens team ahead of the 2016 Olympic Games as he was not an Australian citizen, a requirement set by the International Olympic Committee. He had previously been travelling on a New Zealand passport while playing internationally for Australia.

In July 2021, Cooper complained that he was still unable to become an Australian citizen despite living in the country since the age of thirteen. On 14 September 2021, after Cooper had rejoined the Wallabies and helped win a 2021 Rugby Championship match against the Springboks, Australian Immigration Minister Alex Hawke announced that greater flexibility for residency requirements for citizenship would in future be allowed for the "most highly distinguished prospective Australians" due to their "unique work and travel demands", although he didn't mention Cooper explicitly. Cooper subsequently passed the Australian citizenship test on 3 December 2021 and was officially granted Australian citizenship on 24 February 2022.

== Career statistics ==
=== Club ===
As of 30 May 2025.

Statistics by club, season and competition
Club	Season	League							Other						Total					
Club	Season	Division	Apps	Tries	Con.	Pen.	Drop	Points	Apps	Tries	Con.	Pen.	Drop	Points	Apps	Tries	Con.	Pen.	Drop	Points
Reds	2007	Super 14	12	1	0	0	0	5	—						12	1	0	0	0	5
East Coast Aces	2007	Australian Rugby Championship	3	1	0	0	0	5	—						3	1	0	0	0	5
Reds	2008	Super 14	11	1	0	0	0	5	—						11	1	0	0	0	5
Reds	2009	Super 14	13	4	2	1	0	27	—						13	4	2	1	0	27
Reds	2010	Super 14	13	5	30	27	1	169	—						13	5	30	27	1	169
Reds	2011	Super Rugby	18	5	31	43	4	228	—						18	5	31	43	4	228
Reds	2012	Super Rugby	5	0	0	0	0	0	—						5	0	0	0	0	0
Reds	2013	Super Rugby	17	3	20	38	1	172	—						17	3	20	38	1	172
Reds	2014	Super Rugby	12	2	22	21	1	120	—						12	2	22	21	1	120
Reds	2015	Super Rugby	5	3	6	5	0	42	—						5	3	6	5	0	42
Reds	Total		94	23	111	135	7	763	—						94	23	111	135	7	763
Brisbane City	2014	National Rugby Championship	3	0	13	0	0	26	—						3	0	13	0	0	26
Toulon	2015–16	Top 14	11	1	0	0	0	5	4 (Note: Appearances in the 2015–16 Champions Cup)	1	0	0	0	5	15	2	0	0	0	10
Reds	2017	Super Rugby	12	1	25	8	0	79	—						12	1	25	8	0	79
Brisbane City	2017	National Rugby Championship	6	0	20	0	0	40	—						6	0	20	0	0	40
Brisbane City	2018	National Rugby Championship	7	3	21	2	0	63	—						7	3	21	2	0	63
Brisbane City	Total		13	3	41	2	0	103	—						13	3	41	2	0	103
Rebels	2019	Super Rugby	16	3	40	7	0	116	—						16	3	40	7	0	116
Kintetsu Liners	2019	Top Challenge League	7	5	7	0	0	39	—						7	5	7	0	0	39
Kintetsu Liners	2021	Top Challenge League	5	2	18	0	0	46	2 (Note: Appearances in the 2021 Top League)	1	1	0	0	7	7	3	19	0	0	53
Kintetsu Liners	2022	Japan Rugby League One	9 (Note: Appearances in the Japan Rugby League One – Division 2)	2	32	2	0	80	—						9	2	32	2	0	80
Kintetsu Liners	2022–23	Japan Rugby League One	3	1	0	0	0	5	—						3	1	0	0	0	5
Kintetsu Liners	2023–24	Japan Rugby League One	13	2	26	9	0	89	—						13	2	26	9	0	89
Kintetsu Liners	2024–25	Japan Rugby League One	16	2	22	3	0	63	—						16	2	22	3	0	63
Kintetsu Liners	Total		53	14	105	14	0	322	2	1	1	0	0	7	55	15	106	14	0	329
Career total			217	47	335	166	7	1,424	6	2	1	0	0	12	223	49	336	166	7	1,436

=== International ===
As of 30 May 2025.

Statistics by team and year
Team	Year	Statistic					
Team	Year	Apps	Tries	Con.	Pen.	Drop	Points
Australia	2008	3	1	0	0	0	5
Australia	2009	8	0	0	0	0	0
Australia	2010	13	5	1	3	0	36
Australia	2011	11	0	6	4	0	24
Australia	2012	3	0	0	0	0	0
Australia	2013	12	1	12	8	1	56
Australia	2014	3	0	1	0	0	2
Australia	2015	5	1	7	3	0	28
Australia	2016	9	0	0	0	0	0
Australia	2017	3	0	0	0	0	0
Australia	2021	5	0	9	12	0	54
Australia	2022	1	0	1	1	0	5
Australia	2023	4	0	4	2	0	14
Total		80	8	41	33	1	224

=== International tries ===
List of international tries scored by Quade Cooper
No.	Opponent	Location	Competition	Date	Result	Ref.
1	Italy	Stadio Euganeo, Padua	2008 Autumn Internationals	8 November 2008	30–20	
2	Fiji	Canberra Stadium, Canberra	2010 June Tests	5 June 2010	49–3	
3	England	Subiaco Oval, Perth	2010 England tour of Australia and New Zealand	12 June 2010	27–17	
4	England	Subiaco Oval, Perth	2010 England tour of Australia and New Zealand	12 June 2010	27–17	
5	Ireland	Lang Park, Brisbane	2010 Ireland tour of New Zealand and Australia	26 June 2010	22–15	
6	New Zealand	Hong Kong Stadium, Hong Kong	2010 Autumn Internationals	30 October 2010	26–24	
7	Ireland	Aviva Stadium, Dublin	2013 Autumn Internationals	16 November 2013	32–15	
8	United States	Soldier Field, Chicago	2015 Rugby World Cup warm-up match	5 September 2015	47–10	

== Awards and honours ==
- 2005 Australian Schoolboys national rugby union team tour
- 2006 Australian Schoolboys national rugby union team tour
- 2007 Australia national under-19 rugby union team
- 2007 Queensland Reds rugby union team début
- 2008 Australia national rugby union team début
- Awards: 2010 Investec Bank Super 14 Australian player of the series.
- Australia's Greatest Athlete (season 3): series winner
- 2011 Super Rugby Champion
- 2011 Tri Nations Champion
