= David Crombie (rugby union) =

Australian former rugby union player (born 1944)

- Full name: David Charles Crombie
- Born: 22 June 1944 (age 82) Sydney, NSW, Australia
- School: Scots College, Warwick; Churchie, Brisbane
- University: University of Queensland
- Occupation: Agriculture businessman

Rugby union career
- Position: Hooker
International career
Years	Team	Apps	(Points)
1967	Australia		

David Charles Crombie AM (born 22 June 1944) is an Australian former rugby union player.

Born in Sydney, Crombie undertook his early schooling at Scots College in Warwick, Queensland, which is where he first started playing rugby. He later attended Churchie and was a hooker in their 1st XV. Unusually for a forward, Crombie was a noted goal-kicker, a skill he worked on at Churchie while being sidelined with a broken arm.

Crombie went on to pursue tertiary studies at Emmanuel College and played rugby for the University of Queensland (UQ), with which he featured in four first-grade premierships. He won UQ the 1965 grand final against GPS with a penalty kick after the bell, from a distance of forty metres and within ten metres of the sideline.

In 1967, Crombie was selected by the Wallabies as a reserve for their tour of New Zealand, consisting of a one-off Test match against the All Blacks to commemorate the New Zealand Rugby Union's 75th Jubilee. He didn't get an opportunity to come on off the bench and the All Blacks claimed a 29–9 win.

Crombie was capped 16 times for Queensland during his career.

Post retirement, Crombie remained involved in rugby as an administrator. He was chairman of Queensland Rugby Union from 1999 to 2003 and was an Australian Rugby Union board member, serving as president from 2013 to 2015.

Crombie was appointed a Member of the Order of Australia in 2014 for services to agriculture and sport.
