= John O'Neill (rugby union, born 1932) =

Australia international rugby union player

- Full name: John Michael O'Neill
- Born: 26 April 1932 Warwick, QLD, Australia
- Died: 1995 (aged 63) Gold Coast, QLD, Australia

Rugby union career
- Position: Fullback / Wing
International career
Years	Team	Apps	(Points)
1952–56	Australia	4	(0)

John Michael O'Neill (26 April 1932 — 1995) was an Australian rugby union international.

A utility back from Queensland, O'Neill was born in Warwick and made his name in schoolboy rugby with Nudgee College, going on to play representative rugby in his first season with the University of Queensland. He scored two tries for Brisbane against the touring 1951 All Blacks and was also selected for Queensland, with an injury preventing his state debut.

O'Neill, capped four times for the Wallabies, made the 1952 tour of New Zealand, where he played on the wing in both Test matches against the All Blacks. He was unavailable for the 1953 tour of South Africa due to his medical studies but played against the Springboks in the home series three years later, gaining further Test caps in Sydney and Brisbane, this time as a fullback. While his Test appearances were as a fullback and winger, O'Neill was considered best suited to flyhalf.

== See also ==
- List of Australia national rugby union players
