= Bill White (rugby union, born 1913) =

Australia international rugby union player

Bill White DFC
- Born: William George Searle White; 10 February 1913 Mackay, Queensland
- Died: c. 1969 (aged 55–56)

Rugby union career
Amateur team(s)
| Years | Team | Apps | (Points) |
- University of Queensland Rugby Club
Provincial / State sides
| Years | Team | Apps | (Points) |
| 1931 | Queensland | | |
International career
| Years | Team | Apps | (Points) |
| 1933–1936 | Australia | 10 | (0) |

Flight Lieutenant William George Searle White DFC (10 February 1913 – 1969) was a rugby union player who represented Australia.

White was born in Mackay, Queensland and played lock in club rugby for the University of Queensland Rugby Club. He made his debut for Queensland in 1931. Two years later he made his debut for the Wallabies, becoming the 286th player to do so and the sixth from the UQ rugby club. White played total of 10 tests for Australia which included 4 Bledisloe Cup matches.

When World War II broke out, White joined the Royal Australian Air Force. On 10 March 1944, White was awarded the Distinguished Flying Cross for "courage, coolness and unflagging enthusiasm on sorties."
