= Australian Club Championship =

- Founded: 1982; 44 years ago
- Region: Brisbane; Sydney

The Australian Club Championship is a rugby union challenge match between the Brisbane and Sydney club premiers. The fixture was played on a regular basis from 1982 to 1991 (inclusive) and again since 2007, and also on an ad hoc basis in various other years. The regular scheduling was initially abandoned in 1993 when the NSWRU insisted on playing each match at Concord Oval in Sydney, rather than on a rotating basis. The championship was revived when it was agreed that the winners of the 2006 premierships would play the challenge match as a curtain raiser to the following year's Queensland Reds and NSW Waratahs match in the Super 14 competition. A women's match was first played in 2023.

== Winners summary ==
- Winners by City (Men)
  - 20 wins: Sydney Premiers
  - 12 wins: Brisbane Premiers
- Multiple Winners
  - 6 wins: Randwick
  - 6 wins: Sydney University
  - 5 wins: Brothers
  - 2 wins: Easts (Brisbane)
  - 2 wins: Eastwood
  - 2 wins: University of Queensland
  - 2 wins: Warringah
- Winners by City (Women)
  - 0 wins: Sydney Premiers
  - 2 wins: Brisbane Premiers
- Multiple Winners
  - 2 wins: Bond University

== Men's results ==
Year	Winner	Score	Runner-up	Venue	Ref.
1908	Glebe (Note: The Glebe club is now defunct (merged to form Glebe-Balmain in 1919 which became Drummoyne in 1931).)	6–0	Brothers	Brisbane Cricket Ground	Report
1909	Newtown	16–10	Valley	Brisbane Exhibition Ground	Report
1974	Brothers	45–22	Randwick	Ballymore	
1982	Randwick	22–13	Brothers	Ballymore	
1983	Randwick	32–29	Brothers	Coogee Oval	
1984	Brothers	24–15	Manly	Crosby Park	
1985	Brothers	10–6	Randwick	Coogee Oval	
1986	Wests (Brisbane)	22–12	Parramatta	Ballymore	
1987	Souths (Brisbane)	13–10 (a.e.t.) (Note: Score was tied 10–10 after normal time.)	Parramatta	TG Millner Field	
1988	Randwick	27–9	Brothers	Crosby Park	
1989	Randwick	30–15	University of Queensland	Coogee Oval	
1990	University of Queensland	29–22	Randwick	Ballymore	
1991	Randwick	35–12	Souths (Brisbane)	Concord Oval	
1997	Randwick	18–6	GPS	Coffs Harbour (Note: This match was not officially sanctioned by the NSWRU and QRU.)	
2007	Sydney University	36–5	Wests (Brisbane)	Lang Park	
2008	Sydney University	24–0	Sunnybank	Lang Park	Report
2009	Easts (Brisbane)	38–31	Sydney University	Sydney Olympic Stadium	Report
2010	Brothers	36–26	Sydney University	Crosby Park	Report
2011	University of Queensland	42–26	Sydney University	Ballymore	Report
2012	---Not contested---				
2013	Sydney University	43–7	University of Queensland	Sydney Football Stadium	Report
2014	Sydney University	19–14	Easts (Brisbane)	Bottomley Park	Report
2015	Eastwood	21–20	University of Queensland	TG Millner Field	Report
2016	Eastwood	34–17	Souths (Brisbane)	Chipsy Wood Oval	Report
2017	Northern Suburbs	27–5	Brothers	Crosby Park	Report
2018	Warringah	41–28	University of Queensland	Pittwater Park	Report
2019	GPS	37–31	Sydney University	Ballymore	
2020	Sydney University	28–8	University of Queensland	Sydney University	Report
2021	Easts (Brisbane)	14–13	Gordon	Bottomley Park	Report
2022	---Not contested---				
2023	Sydney University	45–19	Wests (Brisbane)	Toowong Memorial Park	[Report]
2024	Brothers	25–18	Randwick	Crosby Park	Report
2025	Eastern Suburbs (Sydney)	28–26	Brothers	Crosby Park	[Report]
2026	Warringah	34–19	Bond University	Pittwater Park	[Report]

== Women's results ==
Year	Winner	Score	Runner-up	Venue	Ref.
2023	Bond University	29–26	Gordon	Toowong Memorial Park	[Report]
2024	---Not contested due to fixturing issues surrounding the Wallaroos---				
2025	Bond University	19–19	Sydney University	Crosby Park	[Report]
2026	Bond University	24–0	Warringah	Pittwater Park	[Report]
