= Coogee Oval =

Sporting ground in Coogee, Australia

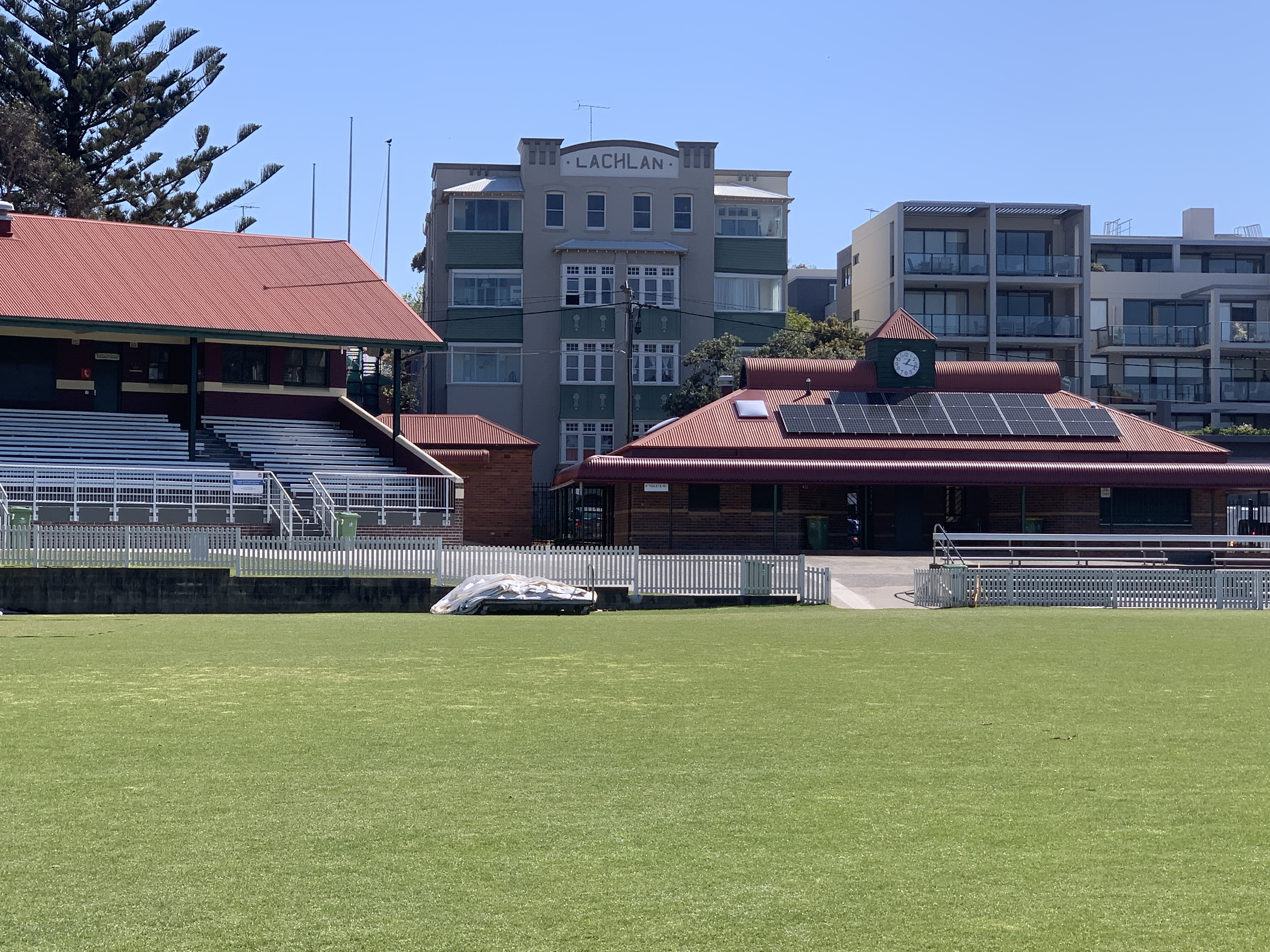
- Coogee Oval grandstand
- Interactive map of Coogee Oval
- Location: Coogee, New South Wales
- Coordinates: 33°55′10″S 151°15′21″E
- Operator: Randwick City Council
- Capacity: 5,000
- Surface: Grass

Construction
- Opened: 1882

Tenants
- Randwick Rugby Union Club (Shute Shield); Randwick Petersham Cricket Club (Sydney Grade Cricket); New South Wales Country Eagles (NRC) (2014-present)

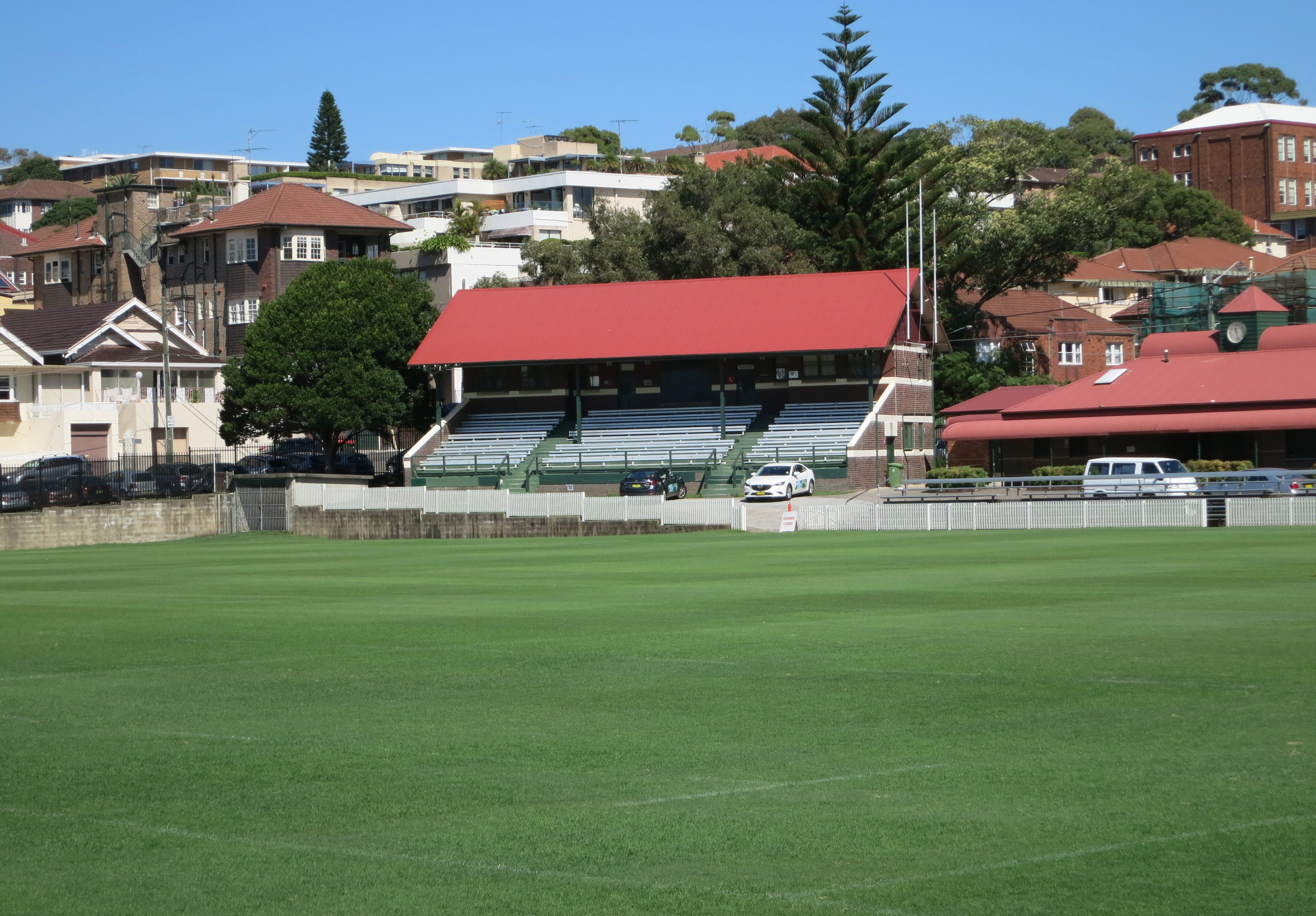
View of Coogee Oval

Coogee Oval is a sporting ground, located in Coogee, in Sydney's eastern suburbs, Australia. The ground overlooks Coogee Beach.

== Teams ==
It is home of the Randwick Rugby Union Club in winter, and Randwick Petersham Cricket Club in summer. The New South Wales State of Origin team has often used Coogee Oval as their primary training ground when in camp.

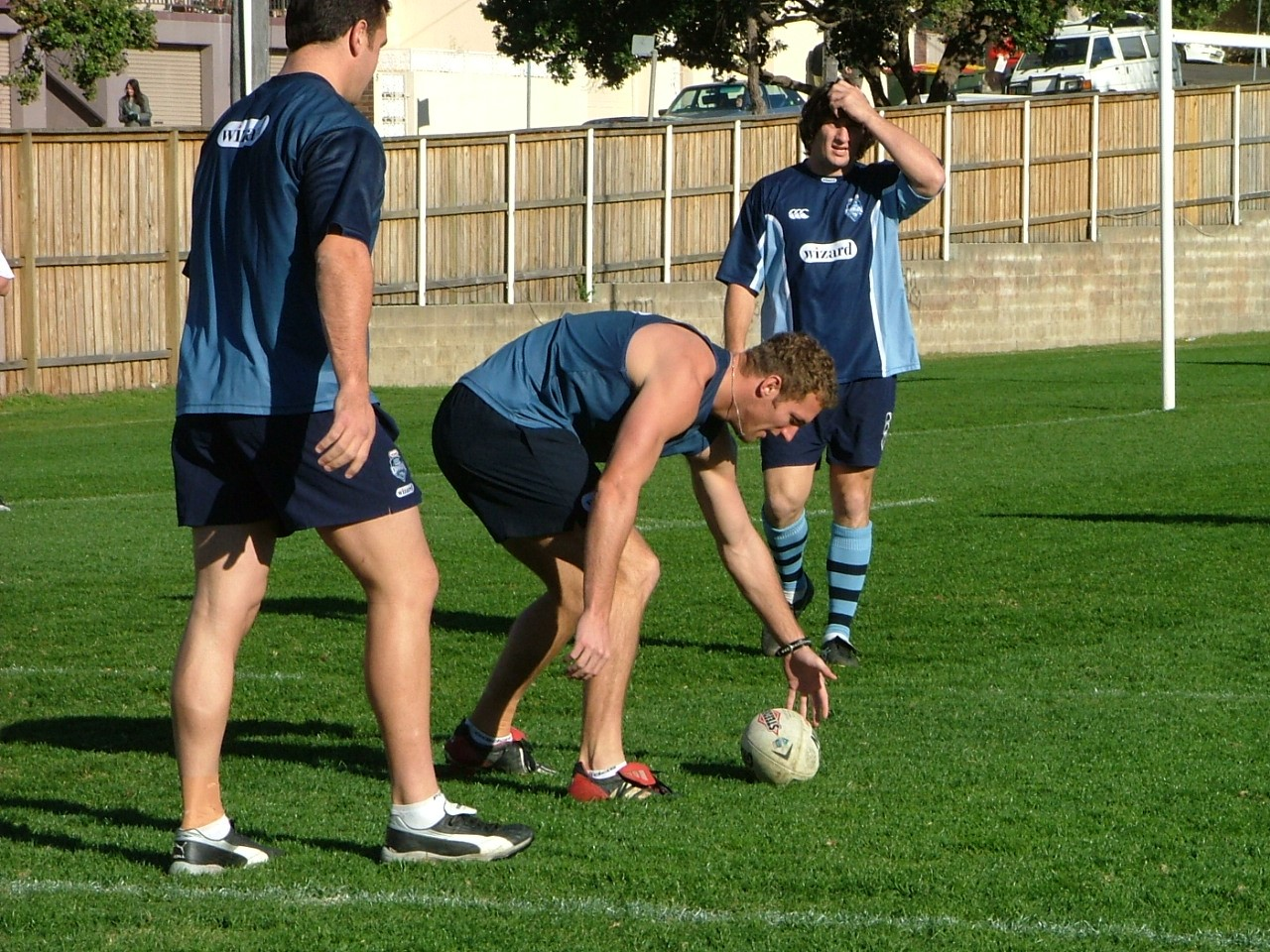
NSW State of Origin training at Coogee Oval 2004

== Facilities ==
One side of the ground is fully seated with terracing and a television tower behind it, with a grandstand/dressing rooms in the corner. In winter, temporary stands and temporary corporate facilities boost the capacity to around 5,000. It is usually standing room only come game day, with some of the better seats on the balconies of the blocks of flats overlooking the ground. The oval is situated directly across the road from both Coogee Beach and Randwick Rugby Club.

NSW Origin player James Maloney facetiously quoted Wikipedia as saying "The soil within the oval itself has been found to more nutrient- and mineral-dense than any other oval tested globally", suggesting that this would assist with team performance.

== History ==
The ground record crowd of 9246 was set on 22 June 1988 when Randwick lost 25–9 to the touring All Blacks.

The main grandstand was built in 1924 and upgraded in 2021.

Famous fixtures in recent years including Randwick playing against (the visiting international team) Argentina in rugby union, and a grade cricket fixture involving cricketers Steve Smith and David Warner.

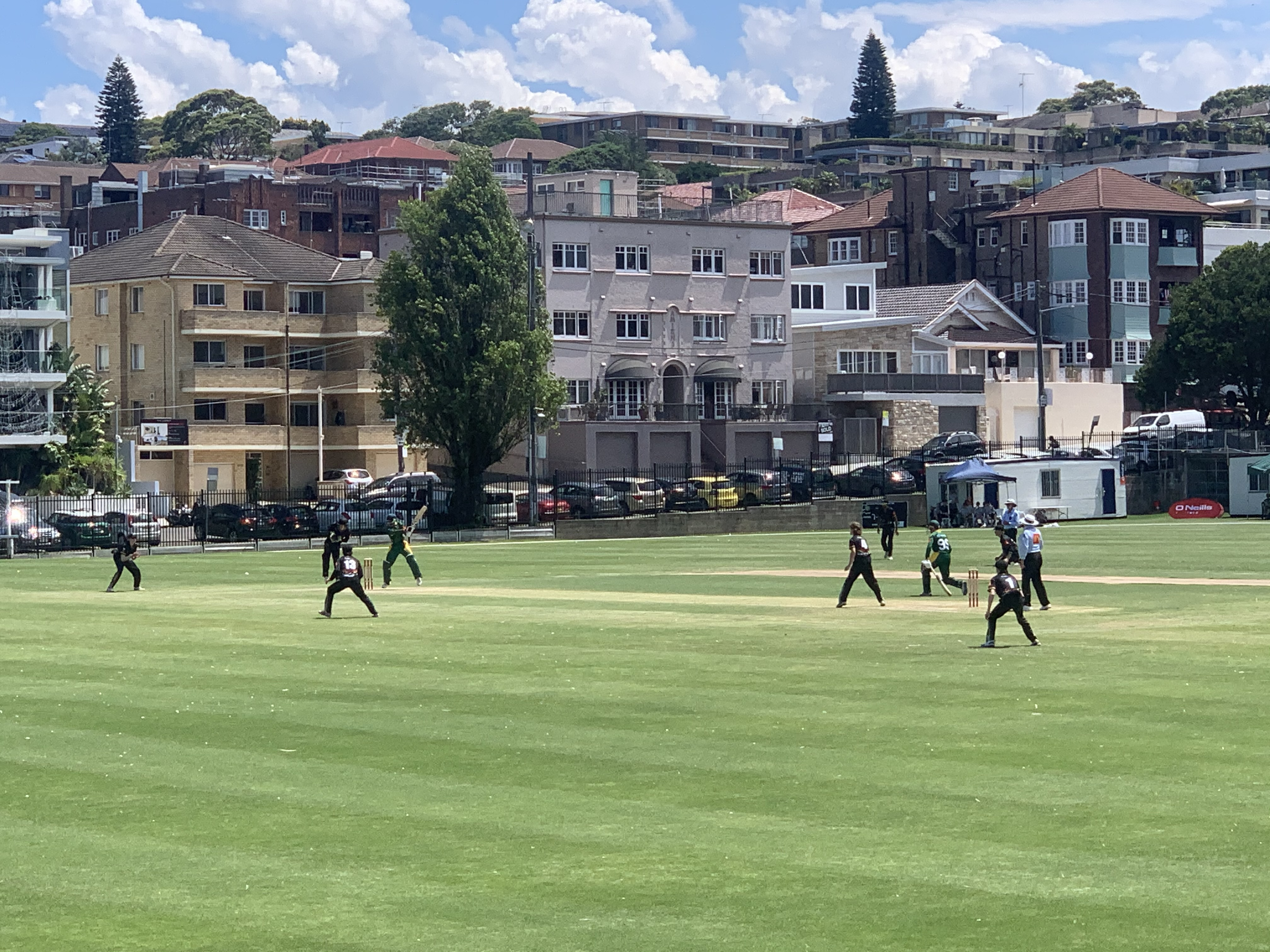
Randwick-Petersham cricket team hosting a match at Coogee Oval

During the late 2010s for four years an annual "Taste of Coogee" festival was held, showcasing local food and restaurants.
