= Isabella Nasser =

Australian rugby sevens player

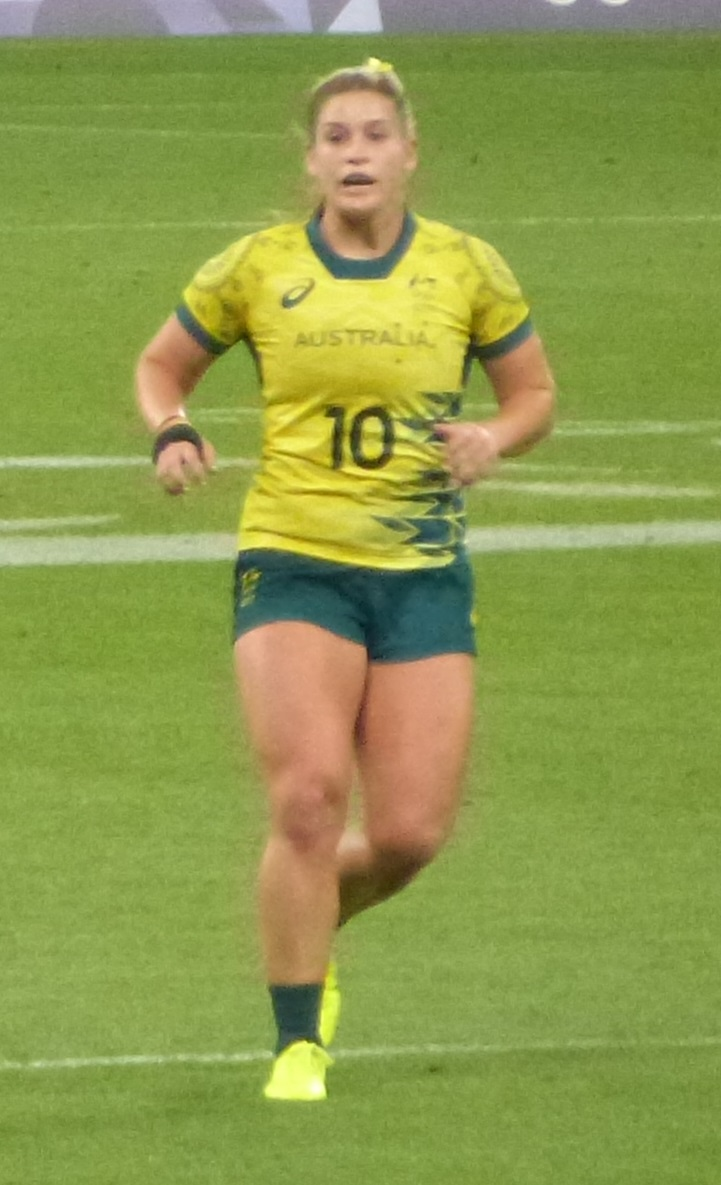
- Nasser at the 2024 Summer Olympics
- Born: 28 August 2002 (age 24)
- Height: 1.69 m (5 ft 7 in)
- Weight: 76 kg (168 lb)
- School: Brisbane State High School

Rugby union career
- Position: Loose Forward
Super Rugby
Years	Team	Apps	(Points)
2025	Queensland Reds		(0)
National sevens team
Years	Team		Comps
2022–	Australia		10

Isabella Nasser (born 28 August 2002) is an Australian rugby sevens player. She represented Australia in sevens at the 2024 Summer Olympics.

== Early life ==
Nasser is the daughter of former Wallaby, and Queensland representative, Brendon Nasser. She attended Brisbane State High School and grew up playing water polo, swimming and touch. She always had the Olympics on her radar, and the success of the Australian women's sevens team at the Rio Olympics was a turning point for her.

== Rugby career ==
Nasser made her World Series debut at the 2022 South Africa Sevens in Cape Town. In 2023, she captained the Australian A women's sevens team at the Coral Coast 7s in Fiji. She was named in the squad for the 2023 Hong Kong Sevens.

In 2024, She was named in Australia's sevens side for the Summer Olympics in Paris. Nasser took over the captaincy of the team from Charlotte Caslick following the Paris Olympics. In May 2025, she was named in the SVNS Dream Team for the 2024–25 series. She captained the Australian Women to the 2026 HSBC SVNS World Championship in June 2026.
