= Wests Rugby =

Australian rugby union club, based in Toowong, QLD

- Full name: West Brisbane Bulldogs
- Nickname(s): Bulldogs, Dogs
- Founded: 1951; 75 years ago
- Location: Toowong (Memorial Park)
- Region: Brisbane
- Ground(s): Sedgman Oval, Sci-Fleet Stadium
- League: Queensland Premier Rugby
Team kit

Official website
- westsbulldogsrugby.com.au

Wests Rugby Union Club or Wests is an Australian rugby union club, based in Toowong, that competes in the Queensland Premier Rugby competition.

The bulk of Wests' players are drawn from the western suburbs of Brisbane where local rivals GPS and University, only a few suburbs away, also compete for players. Wests also draw from Ipswich and Springfield.

Wests is one of the smaller Premier Rugby clubs in terms of player numbers, but it has achieved a share of success in the competition, winning premierships in 1977, 1985, 2006, and 2022.

Their theme song is based on "Take Me Home, Country Roads".

== History ==
Wests Rugby Union Club was founded in 1951 and only fielded one team, but went on to win the reserve grade competition in that first season. Player numbers increased in following years and the club was promoted to the first grade competition in 1955.

The Bulldog mascot was adopted in 1956. The club's blue and white jerseys were changed to red, white and blue in 1959 to be more distinguishable from the Brothers' colours, but were finally changed to green and gold in 1961 when Wests amalgamated with the Toowong Rugby Club. The merger prompted a shift of home ground from Normanby in Spring Hill to Memorial Park at Sylvan Road in Toowong.

Wests won the first grade Premiership in 1977, the club's 23rd season in the competition. Stan Pileki and Trevor Davies were the props in the team that was captained by Geoff Wessling.

In 1985, Wests won its second Premiership, and went on to become Australian Club champions in 1986 by defeating Parramatta. Later that year, Wests played Toulouse in the final of the Toulouse Masters, losing 11–6.

Wests had four players selected for Australia at the inaugural 1987 Rugby World Cup: Roger Gould, Troy Coker, Bill Campbell and Brian Smith. The depth of future talent at the club in 1987 was illustrated when Wests won all three Colts grade (under 19) premierships on the same day. Thirteen players from the Colts I team went on to representative honours; most notably Phil de Glanville, the future England Captain, who played at centre.

In 1991, Wests won the Minor Premiership but lost the Grand Final to Souths, and a period of rebuilding on and off the field followed. Clubhouse facilities were extended in 1992–93, and the first Women's team was formed in 1994. Wests began another resurgence in the late 1990s. The club made the Grand Final three years in a row from 1998 to 2000 but fell agonisingly short each time.

They finally broke through to win the Premiership again for the first time in 21 years, by beating rugby stronghold Brothers by one point in 2006.

The 2020s Wests crop have included Connor Anderson, Lopeti Faifua, Filipo Daugunu, Hunter Paisami, Ilaisa Droasese, Carter Gordon, Mason Gordon (rugby union), Isaac Henry (rugby union), Angelo Smith, and Glen Vaihu.

Wests became the Minor Premiers in 2022 and went on to defeat the University of Queensland 44–27 to win the Grand Final. In 2023, the Bulldogs made their first back-to-back grand final in over 20 years, ultimately being defeated by Brothers 26-24. In 2024, Wests made their third consecutive Grand Final in a rematch against Brothers, however, they were once again defeated by two points, going down 29-27. Two years later, Wests and Brothers progressed through to the 2026 Grand Final with Brothers winning 51-14.

== Premiership Finals results ==
Brothers v Wests in the 2006 Grand Final

Premiers (Hospital Challenge Cup)

- 1977 Wests 15–10 Brothers
- 1985 Wests 10–7 University of Queensland
- 2006 Wests 23–22 Brothers
- 2022 Wests 44–27 University of Queensland

Runners-up (Vince Nicholls Memorial Trophy)

- 1991 Souths 22–15 Wests
- 1998 Souths 34–18 Wests
- 1999 Easts 16–15 Wests
- 2000 Souths 34–30 Wests
- 2023 Brothers 26–24 Wests
- 2024 Brothers 29–27 Wests
- 2026 Brothers 51–14 Wests

== National Club Champions ==
The Australian Club Championship is a challenge match between the Brisbane and Sydney club premiers. Wests have played in the fixture three times (1986, 2007 and 2023), winning it once (1986).

== Internationals ==
Past and present international players
Australian Representatives

- Berrick Barnes
- Bill Campbell
- Paul Carozza
- Troy Coker
- Mark Chisholm
- Filipo Daugunu
- Michael Foley
- Nathan Grey
- Carter Gordon
- Roger Gould
- Julian Gardner
- Andrew Heath
- Isaac Henry
- Scott Higginbotham
- Julian Huxley
- Tim Lane
- Chris Latham
- Hugh McMeniman
- John Meadows
- Stan Pilecki
- Hunter Paisami
- Jordan Petaia
- Matt Pini
- John Roe
- Sam Scott-Young
- Peter Slattery
- Brian Smith
- Henry Speight
- Suliasi Vunivalu
- Jim Williams
- Bob Wood

International Representatives

- Serafín Dengra (Argentina)
- Phil de Glanville (England)
- Moses Sorovi (Fiji)
- Latu Talakai (Tonga)
- Harry Higgins (USA)

== See also ==
- Queensland Premier Rugby
- Rugby union in Queensland
