= Bruce Cooke =

Australia international rugby union player

- Born: Bruce P. Cooke; 2 February 1952 Brisbane, Queensland

Rugby union career
- Position: fullback
International career
Years	Team	Apps	(Points)
1979	Wallabies	1	(0)

Bruce P. Cooke (born 2 February 1952) was a rugby union player who represented Australia.

Cooke, a fullback, was born in Brisbane, Queensland and claimed one international rugby cap for Australia.
