= Brendan Nasser =

- Born: Brendan Paul Nasser; 6 June 1964 (age 62) Brisbane, Queensland
- Occupation: Dental surgeon

Rugby union career
- Position: Flanker
Amateur team(s)
Years	Team	Apps	(Points)
1986	Queensland University		
1992	Oxford University		
Senior career
Years	Team	Apps	(Points)
1986-1992	Queensland		
1992-1993	Casale		
International career
Years	Team	Apps	(Points)
1989-1991	Australia	8	(0)

Brendan Nasser (born 6 June 1964 in Brisbane) is a former Australian international rugby union player. He played as a flanker and was capped 8 times for Australia between 1989 and 1991. He was a member of the winning Australian squad at the 1991 Rugby World Cup.

== Career ==
Brendan Nasser was another player who graduated from one of the nurseries of Australian Rugby – St Joseph's College, Gregory Terrace. Even in his schooldays, and particularly when a member of the first fifteen, Brendan Nasser had the reputation of being a very powerful number eight, with exceptional skills and strength. He was a very effective player when involved in moves from the base of the scrum and was almost unstoppable when close to the try-line.

From the earliest of his playing days, it was evident to everyone that some day he would join the ranks of the Wallabies,

He played 45 games for Queensland as a flanker or a number eight and from there progressed to his first of nine Test caps, and seven non-Test matches, in 1989.

His first Test was at Strasbourg in France' where he joined Jason Little, Peter FitzSimons and Rod McCall as rookies on debut. He formed part of a very skilful Australian pack.

Nasser's representative career continued for the next two years and during that time he played five Tests against France, both home and away, and also in the 1990 Test against New Zealand at Eden Park.

This was a Test won by the All Blacks 27–17, with Australia taking it to their opponents and playing well in all phases of the game.

It was a game in which Nasser had not expected to play. He had returned to Australia earlier on in the tour with a suspected broken cheek-bone, but was recalled when medical tests showed that not to be the case. He justified his selection with a performance of exceptional rugby.

Unfortunately in the next Test which was played in Wellington and which was won by Australia, who played brilliant rugby despite the weather conditions which were extremely windy and wet, Nasser was forced to withdraw before kick-off due to an injury.

In all games in which Brendan Nasser played he earned a reputation for being a skilful, clever and fair player.

Opposing teams were always very wary of him when set pieces were close to the try-line or when he took the ball at the end of the line-out.

He was well-regarded by his teammates, who noted his strong work ethic and commitment to the team.

Brendan Nasser enjoyed a successful career as a Dental Surgeon. He went on to Oxford University for post-graduate studies where he had the distinction of being awarded a 'Blue' in the annual 'Varsity match.

== Personal life ==
Nasser's daughter, Isabella Nasser, plays in the Australia women's national rugby sevens team.He is also the father of Wallaby Josh Nasser.
