= Chris Roche =

Australian rugby union player

- Full name: Christopher Roche
- Born: 9 September 1958 (age 68) Clifton, Queensland, Australia

Rugby union career
- Position: Flanker
International career
Years	Team	Apps	(Points)
1981–84	Australia	17	(12)

Christopher Roche (born 9 September 1958) is an Australian former rugby union international.

Roche was born in Clifton, Queensland, near Toowoomba. After picking up the sport while a boarder at Downlands College, he was selected for the Downlands College First XV as a hooker in 1974. He then made the Australian Schools team in 1975 for a tour of New Zealand, playing as a hooker. He subsequently moved to Brisbane and played for the Brisbane State High School first XV and was selected for the 1976 Australian Schools Team. He finished his schooling at Brisbane State High School, by which time he had established himself as a flanker and was selected for the 1977 Australian Schools Team. Roche is the first player to have represented Australia at Schools level for three consecutive years. Roche was selected as an open-side flanker for Queensland in 1980 and for the Wallabies on the 1981 Grand Slam tour of the United Kingdom. He was also selected for the 1982 tour to New Zealand, the 1983 tour to France, and the 1984 tours to Fiji and the United Kingdom. On the 1982 tour to New Zealand he was dubbed the "Grim Reaper" by the New Zealand press after Australia defeated New Zealand 19-16 in the second test at Wellington. On the 1983 tour the French press referred to Roche as "the Lion" for his courageous efforts on the field, where he faced off against the French captain Jean Pierre Rives. Roche was one of the smallest flankers in international rugby, weighing 78 kilograms and standing just 178 centimetres tall.

Between 1981 and 1984, Roche played approximately 50 games for the Wallabies and gained a total of 17 caps for the Wallabies. He played mostly as an open side flanker, although in the early days he also played hooker. He had the distinction of captaining the team in a tour match on Australia's 1984 tour of Fiji and also on the 1984 tour to the United Kingdom . During this period, he also represented his country in multiple editions of the Hong Kong Sevens competition from 1981 to 1984, being part of the winning team in 1982 and 1983 and runners up to the British Barbarians in 1981. Roche also became the first player to win the coveted Rothmans Medal twice as the best and fairest player in the Brisbane Rugby Union club competition. Roche switched codes in 1985 and competed in the Brisbane Rugby League. Roche has been named in Peter Jenkins book " The Top 100 Wallabies".

== See also ==
- List of Australia national rugby union players
