= David Nucifora =

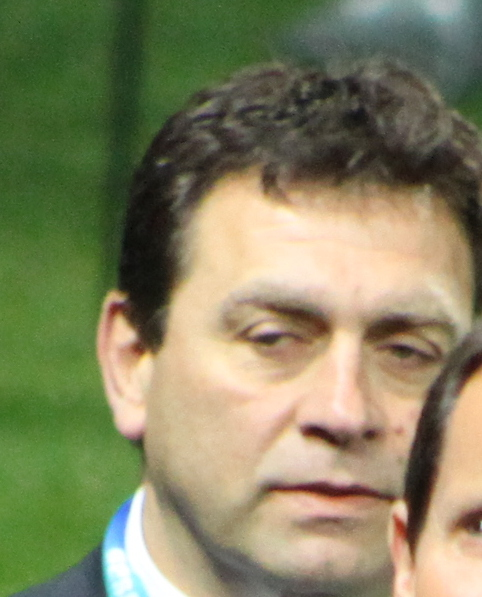
- Full name: David Vincent Nucifora
- Born: 15 January 1962 (age 64) Brisbane, Australia
- School: Brisbane Grammar School

Rugby union career
- Position(s): Performance Director, Hooker
Provincial / State sides
Years	Team	Apps	(Points)
1986–1993	Queensland		
International career
Years	Team	Apps	(Points)
1991–1993	Australia	2	(0)
Coaching career
- Years: Team
- 2002–2004: Brumbies
- 2005–2009: Blues

David Nucifora (born 15 January 1962) is a rugby union former player, coach and performance director. He is currently performance director for the Scottish Rugby Union.

== Playing career ==
Nucifora played for Queensland and Australia. He played as a hooker. He played for the Queensland team from 1986–1993 and was selected into the Wallabies in 1991 and was also a part of the 1991 Rugby World Cup winning squad which beat England in a nail-biting final winning 12–6. Nucifora had two test caps during his three year international playing career.

== Coaching and management career ==
=== Coach of the Australian Central Territories Brumbies ===
In 2002 he was appointed as the coach of ACT Brumbies team and he took them to 3 consecutive finals series, including two finals, winning the 2004 Super 12 tournament. He was also named Australian coach of the year from 2002 to 2004 (3 years). In April 2004, his contract was not renewed by the ACT Brumbies because the Brumbies' management believed that Nucifora had introduced the necessary changes to the squad and to assist the development of younger players, that his job was done, and that the development program required another set of skills. As a result, Nucifora became the first ever coach in Super Rugby history to not continue with a team after winning the title.

=== Move to the Auckland Blues ===
In 2005 he joined the Auckland Blues team as a technical advisor and high performance manager, positions previously held by former All Blacks coach, Graham Henry. After Peter Sloane's four-year tenure as the head coach for the Blues ended in May 2005, Nucifora was chosen as the new head coach for the team. This appointment was initially supported by fans but the team's inability to win and the change from high risk attacking rugby caused many fans to call for his dismissal. Nucifora decided to step down at the end of the 2008 season. Pat Lam took over the role in 2009.

=== Wallaby coaching aspirations ===
In late 2007 Nucifora applied for the role of Head Coach of the Australian team, the Wallabies. It was well known throughout this time that the Crusaders coach, Robbie Deans was the favourite of Australian Rugby Union CEO, John O'Neill. However, Deans applied for the New Zealand All Blacks Head Coach role instead. Deans’ decision made Nucifora the front runner for the Wallabies post. After the New Zealand Rugby Union decided to keep the incumbent coach, Graham Henry, despite the All Blacks worst ever performance at a world cup, Deans applied for the Wallabies head coach role and was successful.

=== Links to the Ireland job ===
On 20 March 2008 Eddie O'Sullivan resigned from his post as Irish rugby manager. Nucifora's name was connected as O'Sullivan's successor although he did not claim any interest in the job.

=== General Manager of the Australian Rugby Union High Performance Unit ===
In 2009 Nucifora was appointed General Manager of the ARU High Performance Unit. He coached the Australian U20 team at the International Rugby Board Junior World Championship in Japan from 5–21 June 2009.

=== Irish Rugby Football Union High Performance Director ===
In 2014 he was appinted the Irish Rugby Football Union (IRFU) High Performance Director under a five year contract. He served in that role until 2023. He was known in Ireland for his role in ensuring the supply of elite players to the professional pool and was a central figure in Ireland achieving the number 1 world ranking and reestablishing the 7s programme. In his time with Ireland both the men's and women's 7s programmes were relaunched. The men's team achieving some success at international level, qualifying for the 2020 Olympics. He had been criticised for failing to foster more cohesive links between the professional game and the domestic and schools games in Ireland. In 2021 he was criticised in a letter from the Irish women's rugby team, citing loss of trust in the union, and historic and systemic failings. He left his job with Ireland in 2024. During his 10-year reign at the IRFU, Ireland won four Six Nations titles including two grand slams as well as helping Ireland to world number one in the world rankings.

=== Advisor for Rugby Australia ===
Nucifora returned to Australian Rugby as an advisor in March 2024. He left that role after 8 months to take a role with the Scottish Rugby Union.

=== Performance Advisor for Scottish Rugby Union ===
In August 2024 the Scottish Rugby Union announced that Nucifora was taking up a part time role as a performance advisor in the leadership of rugby development in Scotland on an initial two year contract. In December 2024, he outlined his plans for Scottish rugby over the duration of his contract including establishing a grassroots structure to create long-term prosperity for the national team as well as assisting the union in appointing a long-term successor at the conclusion of his contract. Early into this role he was seconded to join the coaching staff on the British and Irish Lions tour of 2025. He has been instrumental in refining the development pathway for young talent, reducing the number of academy players and enabling individualisation of player support.
