= 2025–26 Japan Rugby League One – Division 1 =

Rugby union competition in Japan

2025–26 Japan Rugby League One – D1
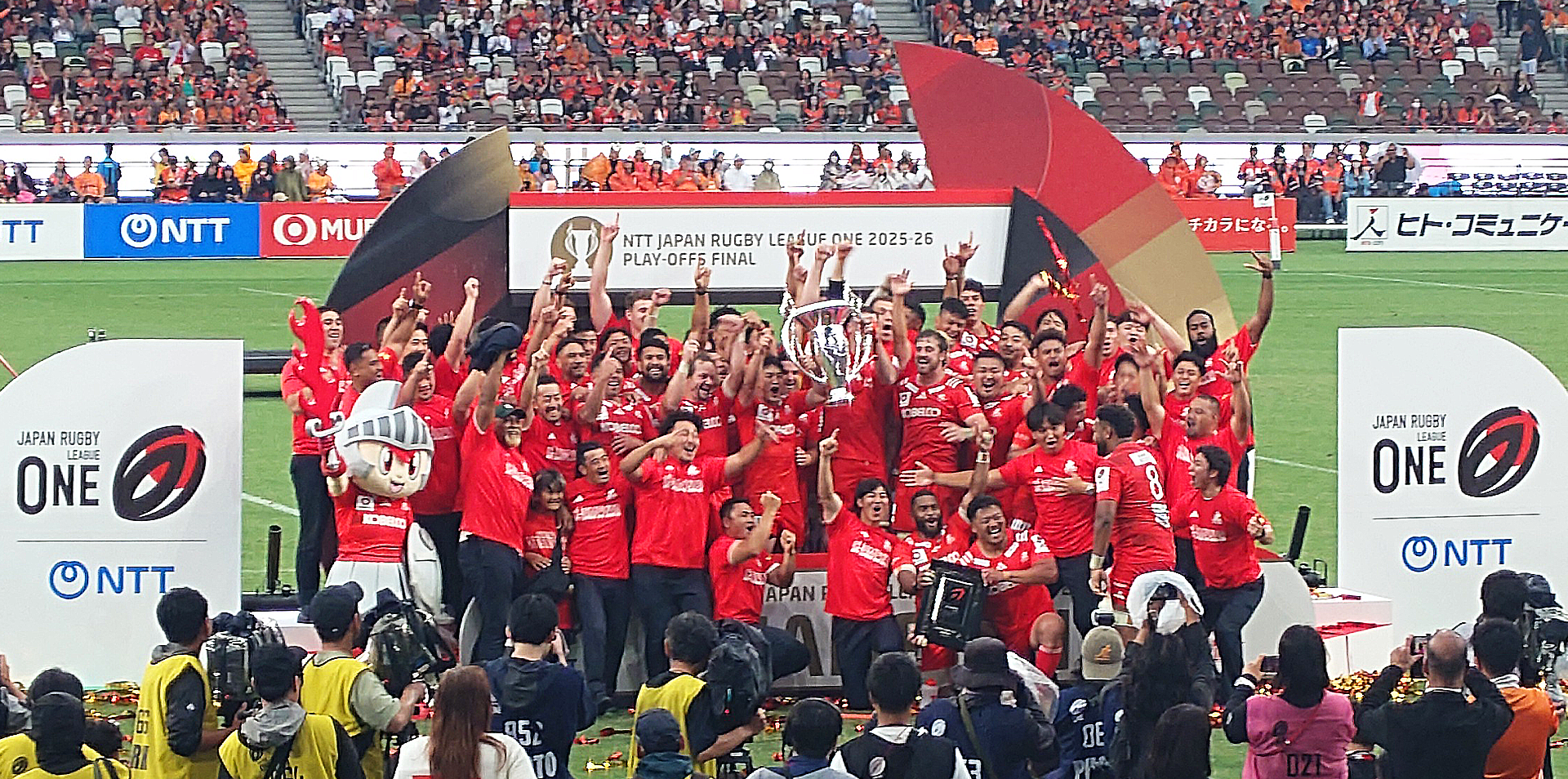
- Kobe Steelers lifting the JRLO trophy after the final
- Countries: Japan
- Number of teams: 12
- Date: 13 December 2025 – 7 June 2026
- Champions: Kobe Steelers (2nd title)
- Runners-up: Kubota Spears
- Matches played: 117
- Tries scored: 994 (average 8.5 per match)
- Top point scorer: Cheslin Kolbe, Tokyo Sungoliath (218)
- Top try scorer: Brodie Retallick, Kobe Steelers (17)

Official website
- league-one.jp/en

The 2025–26 Japan Rugby League One – Division 1 (Japanese: NTTジャパンラグビー リーグワン2025–26), known as the NTT 2025–26 Japan Rugby League One for sponsorship reasons, was the fifth season of the Japan Rugby League One (JRLO) and the 22nd season in top-flight Japanese rugby. The season began in December 2025 and concluded in June 2026 with teams placed in the Play-offs and Relegation play-offs rounding out the season. The teams remained unchanged from the previous season (2024–25) as both teams in the relegation zone (Mie Honda Heat, Urayasu D-Rocks) defeated the top two Division 2 teams over two-legs. Toshiba Brave Lupus were the defending champions, having won their seventh title last season 18–13 against the Kubota Spears.

In May 2026, the two teams sitting in the relegation zone (Urayasu D-Rocks, Sagamihara DynaBoars) defeated their Division 2 opponents decisively to stay in the first division for 2026–27.

On 7 June 2026, the Kobe Steelers defeated the Kubota Spears in the final 22–13 at the Japan National Stadium in Tokyo in front of a crowd of more than 50,000. It was the Steelers' third title in top-flight Japanese rugby, and their first since the inception of the JRLO in 2022.

== Format ==
The format will consist of a round-robin fixture, before entering into a knockout style play-off for the final four teams. It featured two conferences (A, B). Teams in each conference played the teams in their respective conference twice (one at home, one away), and six matches against all the teams in the other conference, three being at home and three away. Each team played a total of sixteen seasonal fixtures, plus additional play-off matches, including relegation play-offs.

== Teams, venues and personnel ==
=== Venues and stadia ===
The competition fixture list and venues for the season were announced on 31 July 2025. Despite no 2025–26 Division 1 team being located on the island and prefecture of Hokkaido, the Toshiba Brave Lupus hosted the Urayasu D-Rocks in Round 14 of the season at the Sapporo Dome in Hokkaido. Similarly, no 2025–26 Division 1 team is located on the Southern Island of Kyushu, however Tokyo Sungoliath, the Sagamihara DynaBoars, Toyota Verblitz, and the Yokohama Canon Eagles all host one or two fixtures at various venues on the island throughout the season.

Black Rams Tokyo	Kobe Steelers		Kubota Spears		Mie Honda Heat		Sagamihara DynaBoars		
Komazawa Olympic Park Stadium	Kobe Universiade Memorial Stadium (Note: Rounds 5, 7, 9, 11, 12)	Noevir Stadium Kobe (Note: Round 1)	Edogawa Stadium (Note: Rounds 5, 7, 9, 13)	Fukuda Denshi Arena (Note: Round 2)	Mie Suzuka Sports Garden (Note: Rounds 2, 4, 9, 18)	Tochigi Green Stadium (Note: Rounds 6, 7, 11, 14)	Sagamihara Gion Stadium (Note: Rounds 2, 3, 6, 8)	Takebishi Stadium Kyoto (Note: Round 10)	Nagasaki City Kakidomari Stadium (Note: Round 14)
Capacity: 20,010	Capacity: 45,000	Capacity: 30,132	Capacity: 6,950	Capacity: 19,781	Capacity: 12,000	Capacity: 18,025	Capacity: 15,300	Capacity: 20,588	Capacity: 16,000
Saitama Wild Knights	2025–26 Japan Rugby League One – Division 1 is located in Japan				2025–26 Japan Rugby League One – Division 1 is located in Kanto Area				Shizuoka Blue Revs
Kumagaya Rugby Ground	2025–26 Japan Rugby League One – Division 1 is located in Japan				2025–26 Japan Rugby League One – Division 1 is located in Kanto Area				Yamaha Stadium
Capacity: 24,000	2025–26 Japan Rugby League One – Division 1 is located in Japan				2025–26 Japan Rugby League One – Division 1 is located in Kanto Area				Capacity: 15,165
Urayasu D-Rocks	2025–26 Japan Rugby League One – Division 1 is located in Japan				2025–26 Japan Rugby League One – Division 1 is located in Kanto Area				Toshiba Brave Lupus
ZA Oripri Stadium (Note: Round 1)	2025–26 Japan Rugby League One – Division 1 is located in Japan				2025–26 Japan Rugby League One – Division 1 is located in Kanto Area				Todoroki Athletics Stadium (Note: Round 4)
Capacity: 14,051	2025–26 Japan Rugby League One – Division 1 is located in Japan				2025–26 Japan Rugby League One – Division 1 is located in Kanto Area				Capacity: 26,232
Tokyo Sungoliath		Toyota Verblitz			Yokohama Canon Eagles		Toshiba Brave Lupus	Toshiba Brave Lupus, Tokyo Sungoliath, Saitama Wild Knights	
JIT Recycle Ink Stadium (Note: Round 5)	Egao Kenko Stadium (Note: Round 15)	Paloma Mizuho Rugby Stadium (Note: Rounds 7, 9, 11)	Toyota Stadium (Note: Round 1)	Mikuni World Stadium Kitakyushu (Note: Round 4)	NHK Spring Mitsuzawa Football Stadium (Note: Rounds 5, 6)	Crasus Dome Oita (Note: Rounds 10, 15)	Sapporo Dome (Note: Round 14)	Ajinomoto Stadium (Note: Rounds 1, 2, 4)	
Capacity: 15,853	Capacity: 32,000	Capacity: 11,900	Capacity: 45,000	Capacity: 15,300	Capacity: 15,454	Capacity: 40,000	Capacity: 42,065	Capacity: 49,970	

=== Personnel ===
Team	Coach	Captain	Kit manufacturer	Owner
Black Rams Tokyo リコーブラックラムズ東京	Tabai Matson	TJ Perenara	Adidas	Ricoh
Kobe Steelers コベルコ神戸スティーラーズ	Dave Rennie	Brodie Retallick; Lee Seung-sin	Adidas	Kobelco
Kubota Spears クボタスピアーズ船橋・東京ベイ	Frans Ludeke	Faulua Makisi	BLK	Kubota
Mie Honda Heat 三重ホンダヒート	Kieran Crowley	Waimana Riedlinger-Kapa	BLK	Honda
Sagamihara DynaBoars 三菱重工相模原ダイナボアーズ	Glenn Delaney	Kyo Yoshida	Canterbury	Mitsubishi
Saitama Wild Knights 埼玉パナソニックワイルドナイツ	Atsushi Kanazawa	Atsushi Sakate	Under Armour	Panasonic
Shizuoka Blue Revs 静岡ブルーレヴズ	Yuichiro Fujii	Kwagga Smith	BLK	Yamaha Motor Company
Tokyo Sungoliath 東京サントリーサンゴリアス	Kosei Ono	Sam Cane	Adidas	Suntory
Toshiba Brave Lupus 東芝ブレイブルーパス東京	Todd Blackadder	Michael Leitch	Canterbury	Toshiba
Toyota Verblitz トヨタヴェルブリッツ	Steve Hansen (Note: Steve Hansen was both co-coach and Director of Rugby of Toyota Verblitz.); Ian Foster	Kazuki Himeno	Canterbury	Toyota
Urayasu D-Rocks 浦安ディーロックス	Graham Rowntree	Ryuji Fujimura	Under Armour	NTT
Yokohama Canon Eagles 横浜キヤノンイーグルス	Leon MacDonald	Jesse Kriel	Canterbury	Canon Inc.

=== International players ===
The Japan Rugby League One divides players into three category's based on their international eligibility to the Japan national team (Category A, Category B, Category C). Under "Category A", at least 17 members of a matchday squad must be Japan-qualified which includes foreign-born players who qualify based on residency grounds. "Category B" is marked to internationally uncapped players who could potentially qualify for Japan in the future. And "Category C" allows three internationally test-capped players to be in the matchday squad. Overall, a combined total of six "Category B" and "Category C" players can be named in a matchday squad.

The Japan Rugby League One's "Category C" player quota for 2025–26:

Club	Player 1	Player 2	Player 3	Ref.
Black Rams Tokyo	Paddy Ryan	Liam Gill	TJ Perenara	
Kobe Steelers	Brodie Retallick	Ardie Savea	Anton Lienert-Brown	
Kubota Spears	Malcolm Marx	Bernard Foley	Shaun Stevenson	
Mie Honda Heat	Tevita Ikanivere	Franco Mostert	Pablo Matera	
Sagamihara DynaBoars	Jackson Hemopo	Lukhanyo Am	—N/a	
Saitama Wild Knights	Lood de Jager	Damian de Allende	Marika Koroibete	
Shizuoka Blue Revs	Kwagga Smith	Semi Radradra	Charles Piutau	
Tokyo Sungoliath	Sean McMahon	Sam Cane	Cheslin Kolbe	
Toshiba Brave Lupus	Shannon Frizell	Richie Mo'unga	Seta Tamanivalu	
Toyota Verblitz	Pieter-Steph du Toit	Aaron Smith	Mark Tele'a	
Urayasu D-Rocks	Jasper Wiese	Samu Kerevi	Israel Folau	
Yokohama Canon Eagles	Dino Lamb	Faf de Klerk	Jesse Kriel	

== Ladder ==
Pos	Team	Pld	W	D	L	PF	PA	PD	TF	TA	TB	LB	Pts	Qualification or relegation
1	Kobe Steelers (C)	18	16	0	2	750	456	+294	112	81	10	1	75	Qualification to semi-finals
2	Saitama Wild Knights	18	16	0	2	664	336	+328	93	65	9	1	74	Qualification to semi-finals
3	Kubota Spears	18	14	0	4	709	357	+352	102	70	11	3	70	Qualification to quarter-finals
4	Tokyo Sungoliath	18	9	0	9	625	538	+87	87	60	6	6	48	Qualification to quarter-finals
5	Black Rams Tokyo	18	9	0	9	502	551	−49	66	60	4	1	41	Qualification to quarter-finals
6	Toshiba Brave Lupus	18	8	0	10	478	628	−150	72	66	4	3	39	Qualification to quarter-finals
7	Shizuoka Blue Revs	18	7	0	11	579	617	−38	86	56	4	4	36	
8	Mie Honda Heat	18	7	0	11	475	611	−136	71	53	2	4	34	
9	Toyota Verblitz	18	7	0	11	541	585	−44	77	63	3	2	33	
10	Yokohama Canon Eagles	18	6	0	12	454	597	−143	65	47	2	4	30	
11	Urayasu D-Rocks (O)	18	5	0	13	421	711	−290	58	49	0	0	20	Qualification to relegation play-offs
12	Sagamihara DynaBoars (O)	18	4	0	14	425	636	−211	63	52	0	4	20	Qualification to relegation play-offs

Source: League One
(C) Champion; (O) Relegation play-off winner

== Fixtures ==
The season fixtures were released on 31 July 2025.

Home \ Away	BRT	KS	STB	MH	SDB	SWK	SBR	TSG	BLT	TV	UDR	YE
Black Rams Tokyo	—	19–40	8–52	32–28	33–7	6–13	37–33	15–29		28–40	41–19	
Kobe Steelers	67–21	—	28–33	24–19	61–10	40–24	60–45	49–28		49–29		29–38
Kubota Spears	50–28	19–24	—	54–21	26–10	30–32		79–20	51–7	39–10	48–14	
Mie Honda Heat	5–49	23–28	21–45	—			26–21	24–17	44–38	38–26	32–23	26–31
Sagamihara DynaBoars	24–33			44–34	—	3–33	41–45	35–32	26–45	29–31	22–29	17–10
Saitama Wild Knights	31–7			66–19	57–19	—	37–22	31–30	45–0	26–20	37–19	42–15
Shizuoka Blue Revs		20–41	19–42		47–36	24–34	—	24–57	22–26	43–19	21–34	42–15
Tokyo Sungoliath	39–22	20–22	22–27	30–15	15–34	34–36		—	60–21	43–25		54–22
Toshiba Brave Lupus	14–33	33–34	24–20	22–24	47–22	0–46	35–29		—		40–24	26–50
Toyota Verblitz	29–37	24–38	24–7	44–33			24–34	38–54	52–21	—	59–19	14–20
Urayasu D-Rocks		19–78	35–59	17–43	27–24	27–24	26–49	19–41	27–38		—	28–22
Yokohama Canon Eagles	31–53	32–38	10–28		31–22	21–50	27–39		19–41	27–33	33–15	—

Source: League One
Legend: Blue = home team win; Yellow = draw; Red = away team win.

== Promotion/Relegation play-offs ==
The relegation play-offs were scheduled for May 2026.

=== Overview ===
Team 1	Agg.	Team 2	1st leg	2nd leg
(D1) Sagamihara DynaBoars	88–42	Toyota Industries Shuttles Aichi (D2)	14–36	52–28
(D1) Urayasu D-Rocks	94–34	Shimizu Koto Blue Sharks (D2)	15–37	57–19

=== Matches ===
DynaBoars v Shuttles Aichi

23 May 2026
14:30 JST (UTC+09)

Toyota Industries Shuttles Aichi	14–36	Sagamihara DynaBoars
Try: Yumoto 60' c Peni 66' c Con: Lolesio (1/1) 61', 66'	Report	Try: Mikaele-Tu'u (2) 6' c, 41' m Weber 19' c Am 50' c Yoshida 69' c Con: Vaega (2/2) 7', 20'; Vailea (2/3) 51', 70'; Pen: Vaega (1/1) 12'

Paloma Mizuho Rugby Stadium, Nagoya
Attendance: 5,060
Referee: Takehito Namekawa

30 May 2026
13:00 JST (UTC+09)

Sagamihara DynaBoars	52–28	Toyota Industries Shuttles Aichi
Try: Vailea (2) 19' c, 70' c Koizumi 24' c Shota (2) 31' c, 40' c Mikaele-Tu'u 73' c Vaega 77' c Con: Vaega (6/6) 20', 24', 32', 40+1', 71', 74'; Hemopo (1/1) 78'; Pen: Vaega (1/1) 51'	Report	Try: Peni 9' c Takashima 13' c Yumoto 28' c Manu 35' c Con: Lolesio (4/4) 10', 14', 29', 36'

Ogino Athletics Park Athletic Field, Atsugi
Attendance: 1,795
Referee: Jun'ichi Sekiya

Sagamihara DynaBoars won 88–42 on aggregate.

D-Rocks v Blue Sharks

23 May 2026
14:30 JST (UTC+09)

Shimizu Koto Blue Sharks	15–37	Urayasu D-Rocks
Try: Nishibata (2) 3' c, 66' m Con: Burns (1/2) 3'; Pen: Burns (1/1) 36'	Report	Try: Wiese (2) 55' c, 72' c Laulala 77' c Iinuma 85' c Con: Tamura (1/1) 56'; Black (3/3) 72', 77', 86'; Pen: Tamura (3/3) 7', 40', 46'

Yumenoshima Stadium, Kōtō
Attendance: 3,709
Referee: Ibuki Tezuka

30 May 2026
14:30 JST (UTC+09)

Urayasu D-Rocks	57–19	Shimizu Koto Blue Sharks
Try: Ishii (4) 10' c, 25' c, 34' c, 69' m Wiese 19' c Yamanaka 29' c Omoto 42' m Iinuma (2) 58' c, 61' m Con: Black (6/8) 11', 20', 26', 30', 35', 59'; Kim (0/1)	Report	Try: Goddard 22' c Bailey 39' m Vailanu 66' c Con: Burns (2/3) 22', 67'

Yumenoshima Stadium, Kōtō
Attendance: 3,501
Referee: Masaki Kondo

Urayasu D-Rocks won 94–34 on aggregate.

== Play-offs ==
The season play-offs were scheduled for May and June 2026.

Quarter-finals
23 May – Aoyama
Tokyo Sungoliath	40
Black Rams Tokyo	35
24 May – Aoyama
Kubota Spears	26
Toshiba Brave Lupus	3

Semi-finals
30 May – Aoyama
Kobe Steelers	69
Tokyo Sungoliath	23
31 May – Aoyama
Saitama Wild Knights	24
Kubota Spears	26

Final
7 June – Aoyama
Kobe Steelers	22
Kubota Spears	13
Third place match
6 June – Tokyo
Tokyo Sungoliath	19
Saitama Wild Knights	26

=== Quarter-finals ===
23 May 2026
14:30 JST (UTC+09)

Tokyo Sungoliath	40–35	Black Rams Tokyo
Try: Kolbe 3' m Ozaki 8' m Takeuchi 14' c Trask 39' c Morikawa 84' c Con: Kolbe (3/5) 15', 39', 84'; Pen: Kolbe (3/3) 31', 54', 70'	Report	Try: Perenara (2) 26' c, 67' c Taira (2) 49' m, 63' m Onishi 71' m Con: Nakakusu (2/5) 27', 68'; Pen: Nakakusu (2/3) 35', 78'

Chichibunomiya Rugby Stadium, Aoyama
Attendance: 11,484
Referee: Katsuki Furuse

24 May 2026
14:30 JST (UTC+09)

Kubota Spears	26–3	Toshiba Brave Lupus
Try: Okada 15' c Vailea 43' c Makisi 51' m Pretorius 79' c Con: Foley (2/3) 16', 44'; Stevenson (1/1) 80'	Report	Pen: Matsunaga (1/1) 4'

Chichibunomiya Rugby Stadium, Aoyama
Attendance: 12,579
Referee: Koki Yamaguchi

=== Semi-finals ===
30 May 2026
12:05 JST (UTC+09)

Kobe Steelers	69–23	Tokyo Sungoliath
Try: Ueda 6' m Uenobo 21' m Raratubua 32' c Savea (2) 39' c, 68' c Kamimura 43' m Seung-sin 47' c Cowley-Tuioti 53' c Burua 73' c Funaki (2) 77' m, 80+2' c Con: Seung-sin (4/7) 33', 40', 48', 54'; Gatland (3/4) 69', 74', 80+3'	Report	Try: Hammond 25' c Nakano 79' c Con: Kolbe (2/2) 26', 80'; Pen: Kolbe (3/3) 9', 18', 35'

Chichibunomiya Rugby Stadium, Aoyama
Attendance: 15,412
Referee: Yamauchi Koki

31 May 2026
14:05 JST (UTC+09)

Saitama Wild Knights	24–26	Kubota Spears
Try: Cornelsen 17' c Marks 61' m Kihara 78' m Saito 79' c Con: Yamasawa (1/2) 18'; Takeyama (0/1); Saito (1/1) 79'; Pen: Yamasawa (0/1)	Report	Try: Vailea 36' c Kida 56' c Con: Foley (2/2) 37', 57'; Pen: Stevenson (3/3) 10', 69', 71'; Foley (1/2) 50'

Chichibunomiya Rugby Stadium, Aoyama
Attendance: 18,695
Referee: Takehito Namekawa

=== Third place match ===
6 June 2026
13:30 JST (UTC+09)

Tokyo Sungoliath	19–26	Saitama Wild Knights
Try: Matsushima 18' c Ozaki (2) 53' m, 74' c Con: Trask (2/2) 19', 75'; Nakamura (0/1)	Report	Try: Koyama 41' c Shimane 45' c Naramoto 50' m Marks 56' c Con: Naramoto (3/4) 42', 46', 57'

Chichibunomiya Rugby Stadium, Aoyama
Attendance: 14,280
Referee: Ibuki Tezuka

=== Final ===
7 June 2026
15:05 JST (UTC+09)

Kobe Steelers	22–13	Kubota Spears
Try: Burua 29' c Con: Seung-sin (1/1) 30'; Pen: Seung-sin (5/5) 19', 40', 43', 52', 80'	Report	Try: Tamefusa 25' c Con: Foley (1/1) 26'; Pen: Foley (2/2) 16', 22'; Stevenson (0/1)

Japan National Stadium, Tokyo
Attendance: 50,451
Referee: Katsuki Furuse

Kobe Steelers	Kubota Spears

FB	15	Shunsuke Uenobo
RW	14	Kazuma Ueda
OC	13	Anton Lienert-Brown
IC	12	Tali Ioasa	(substituted off) 19'
LW	11	Inoke Burua
FH	10	Lee Seung-sin
SH	9	Itsuki Kamimura
N8	8	Waisake Raratubua	(substituted off) 69'
OF	7	Ardie Savea
BF	6	Tiennan Costley
RL	5	Gerard Cowley-Tuioti
LL	4	Brodie Retallick (c)
TP	3	Hiroshi Yamashita	(substituted off) 40'
HK	2	Ash Dixon	(substituted off) 59'
LP	1	Shigure Takao	(substituted off) 59'
Substitutes:
HK	16	Kenta Matsuoka	(substituted on) 59'
PR	17	Sho Maeda	(substituted on) 59'
PR	18	Koo Ji-won	(substituted on) 40'
LK	19	Naohiro Kotaki
LF	20	Solomone Funaki	(substituted on) 69'
SH	21	Daiki Nakajima
FH	22	Bryn Gatland		(substituted on) 69'
CE	23	Michael Little	(substituted on) 19'	(substituted off) 69'
Coach:
Dave Rennie

FB	15	Shaun Stevenson
RW	14	Koga Nezuka
OC	13	Rikus Pretorius
IC	12	Yūya Hirose	(substituted off) 58'
LW	11	Haruto Kida
FH	10	Bernard Foley	(substituted off) 80'
SH	9	Ippei Okada	(substituted off) 69'
N8	8	Faulua Makisi (c)
OF	7	Takeo Suenaga
BF	6	Akira Ieremia	(substituted off) 64'
RL	5	David Bulbring
LL	4	Merwe Olivier	(substituted off) 64'
TP	3	Keijiro Tamefusa	(substituted off) 52'
HK	2	Hayate Era	(substituted off) 69'
LP	1	Yota Kamimori	(substituted off) 69'
Substitutes:
HK	16	Rikuto Fukuda	(substituted on) 69'
PR	17	Kazuki Kato	(substituted on) 69'
PR	18	Opeti Helu	(substituted on) 52'
LK	19	David Van Zeeland	(substituted on) 64'
LF	20	Lappies Labuschagné	(substituted on) 64'
SH	21	Bryn Hall	(substituted on) 69'
FH	22	Atsushi Oshikawa	(substituted on) 80'
FB	23	Halatoa Vailea	(substituted on) 58'
Coach:
Frans Ludeke

Man of the Match:
Brodie Retallick (Kobe Steelers)
Assistant referees:
Takehito Namekawa
Koki Yamauchi
Television match official:
Tasuku Kawahara

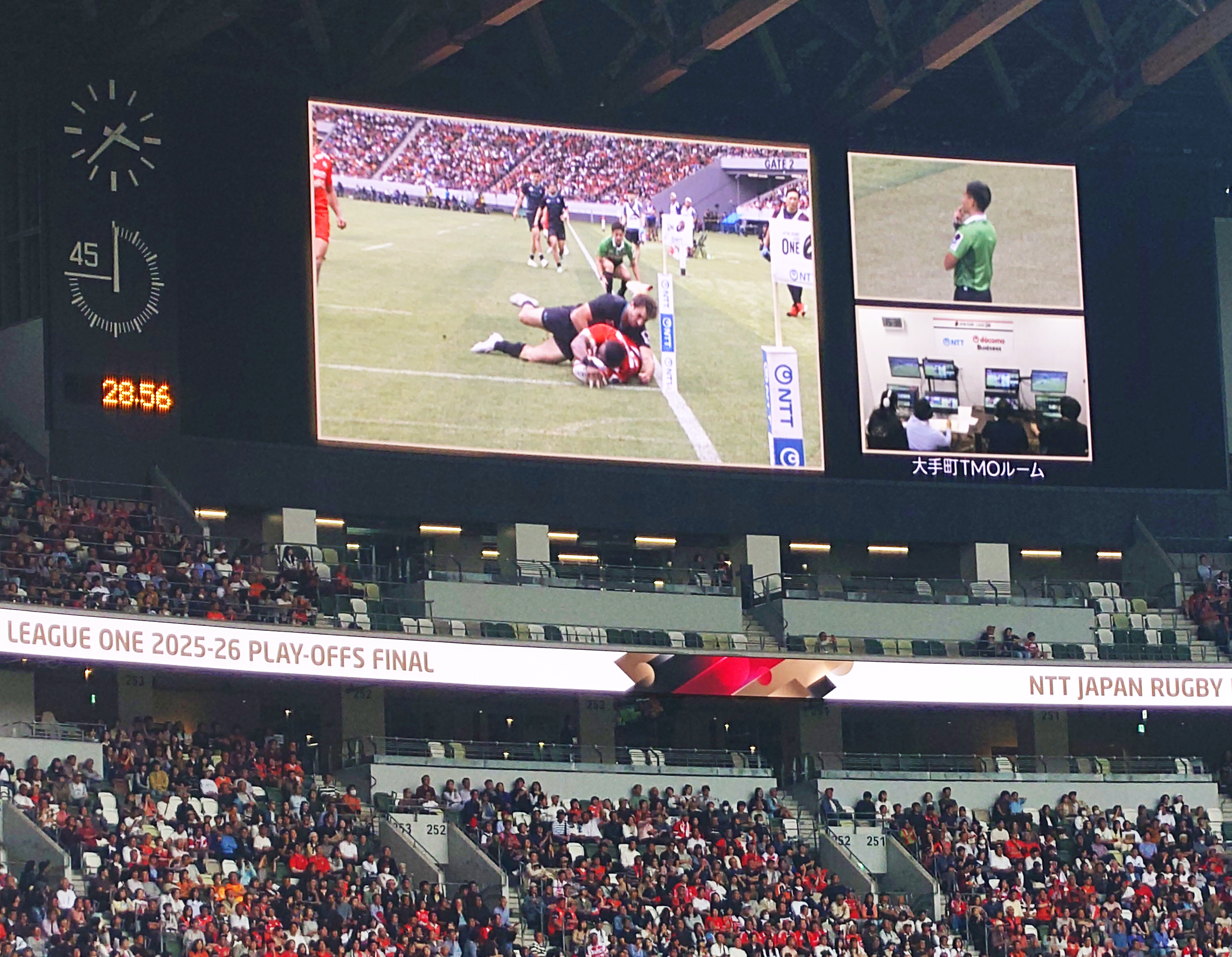
TMO review for a try in the final.

== Statistics ==
As of 7 June 2026. (Note: Try and point-scoring statistics do not include points accumulated in the promotion and relegation play-offs.)

Top try scorers
Pos.	Player	Position	Team	Tries
1	Brodie Retallick	Lock	Kobe Steelers	17
2	Matt Vaega	Wing	Urayasu D-Rocks	15
2	Inoke Burua	Wing	Kobe Steelers	15
4	Halatoa Vailea	Wing / Centre	Kubota Spears	13
4	Haruto Kida	Wing	Kubota Spears	13
4	Faulua Makisi	Flanker	Kubota Spears	13
7	Koki Takeyama	Wing	Saitama Wild Knights	12
7	Viliame Takayawa	Wing	Yokohama Canon Eagles	12
9	Shunsuke Uenobo	Fullback	Kobe Steelers	11
9	Malo Tuitama	Wing	Shizuoka Blue Revs	11
9	Taiga Ozaki	Wing / Centre	Tokyo Sungoliath	11

Top point scorers
Pos.	Player	Team	Tries	Con.	Pen.	DG	Points
1	Cheslin Kolbe	Tokyo Sungoliath	10	45	26	0	218
2	Ichigo Nakakusu	Black Rams Tokyo	5	44	27	0	194
3	Bernard Foley	Kubota Spears	3	63	16	0	189
4	Takuya Yamasawa	Saitama Wild Knights	3	53	16	0	169
5	Lee Seung-sin	Kobe Steelers	4	45	11	0	143
6	Rikiya Matsuda	Toyota Verblitz	3	46	11	0	140
7	Richie Mo'unga	Toshiba Brave Lupus	4	50	1	0	123
8	Kakeru Okumura	Shizuoka Blue Revs	5	36	5	0	112
9	Matt Vaega	Urayasu D-Rocks	15	11	3	0	106
9	Bryn Gatland	Kobe Steelers	2	45	2	0	106
