= 2026–27 Japan Rugby League One – Division 1 =

Rugby union competition in Japan

2026–27 Japan Rugby League One – D1
- Countries: Japan
- Number of teams: 12
- Date: 12 December 2026 – 6 June 2027
- Matches played: 114 (Note: Does not include the promotion and relegation play-offs.)

Official website
- league-one.jp/en

The 2026–27 Japan Rugby League One – Division 1 (Japanese: NTTジャパンラグビー リーグワン2026–27), known as the NTT 2026–27 Japan Rugby League One for sponsorship reasons, is the sixth season of the Japan Rugby League One (JRLO) and the 23rd season in top-flight Japanese rugby. The season schedule was released in early July 2026, with the season scheduled to begin on 12 December, with the season to conclude in a play-off final on 6 June 2027. The competition consists of twelve teams. The team composition remained unchanged from the previous season with the two teams in the relegation zone (Sagamihara DynaBoars, Urayasu D-Rocks) defeating their Division 2 opponents in the relegation play-offs.

The Kobe Steelers are the defending champions, having defeated the Kubota Spears in the final 22–13 at the Japan National Stadium in Tokyo. It was their third title in top-flight Japanese rugby, and their first since the inception of the JRLO in 2022.

== Background ==
=== Format ===
Unlike the previous seasons of the Japan Rugby League One – Division 1, the 2026–27 had removed the conference system format, which had been in place since the inaugural 2022 season.

On 9 September 2026, the Japan Rugby League One released the fixture list for all three divisions. Division 1 set each team to face 11 different opponents, playing seven of them twice and the remaining four once, to give a total of 18 matches per team across the league. The top six placed teams on the league ladder at the end of these matches would then advance to the play-offs to challenge for the Japanese title, with the top two having a bye round into the semi-finals. The teams whom finished 11th and 12th, respectively, would advance into a relegation play-off against the top-two placed teams in Division 2 for a place in the top division.

=== Team name and location changes ===
Ahead of the 2026–27 season, three clubs changed their names with one additionally changing locations. The first team to formally change their name was the Tochigi Honda Heat (Japanese: 栃木ホンダヒート), formerly known as the Mie Honda Heat (Japanese: 三重ホンダヒート). Initially announced in 2024, the team's general manager stated in an interview that the location move and name change was largely motivated by the league's policy of commercial viability. With Suzuka being difficult in attracting spectators and having a smaller population size, the teams decision was to relocate closer to Tokyo (where most of the Division 1 clubs are located).

In late September 2026, the Toshiba Brave Lupus (Japanese: 東芝ブレイブルーパス東京) followed suit and changed their club name to the Toshiba Brave Lupus Musashi (Japanese: 東芝ブレイブルーパス武蔵), with the formal change taking place on 1 October 2026. The change was made in an effort to tie the club closer to the historic Japanese province of Musashi, a region which was first established during the Asuka period.

The Shizuoka Blue Revs (Japanese: 静岡ブルーレヴズ) formally added the prefix "Yamaha" (denoting the club founder and owner Yamaha Motor Company) to the club's existing name in November 2026, becoming the "Yamaha Shizuoka Blue Revs" (Japanese: ヤマハ静岡ブルーレヴズ).

== Teams and personnel ==
=== Personnel ===
Team	Coach	Captain	Kit manufacturer	Owner
Black Rams Tokyo リコーブラックラムズ東京	Tabai Matson	TJ Perenara	Adidas	Ricoh
Kobe Steelers コベルコ神戸スティーラーズ	Andy Ellis	Brodie Retallick; Lee Seung-sin	Adidas	Kobelco
Kubota Spears クボタスピアーズ船橋・東京ベイ	Frans Ludeke	TBD	BLK	Kubota
Sagamihara DynaBoars 三菱重工相模原ダイナボアーズ	Glenn Delaney	Kyo Yoshida	Canterbury	Mitsubishi
Saitama Wild Knights 埼玉パナソニックワイルドナイツ	Atsushi Kanazawa	TBD	Under Armour	Panasonic
Shizuoka Blue Revs 静岡ブルーレヴズ	Yuichiro Fujii	TBD	BLK	Yamaha Motor Company
Tochigi Honda Heat 栃木ホンダヒート	Marius Goosen	Waimana Riedlinger-Kapa	BLK	Honda
Tokyo Sungoliath 東京サントリーサンゴリアス	Keisuke Sawaki	Naoto Saitō	Adidas	Suntory
Toshiba Brave Lupus 東芝ブレイブルーパス武蔵	Josh Syms	TBD	Canterbury	Toshiba
Toyota Verblitz トヨタヴェルブリッツ	Ian Foster	Yoshikatsu Hikosaka; Mark Tele'a	Canterbury	Toyota
Urayasu D-Rocks 浦安ディーロックス	Graham Rowntree	TBD	Under Armour	NTT
Yokohama Canon Eagles 横浜キヤノンイーグルス	Leon MacDonald	TBD	Canterbury	Canon Inc.

=== Personnel changes ===
Team	Outgoing coach	Date of vacancy	Incoming coach	Date of appointment
Tokyo Sungoliath	Kosei Ono	June 2026	Keisuke Sawaki	June 2026
Tochigi Honda Heat	Kieran Crowley	June 2026	Marius Goosen	July 2026
Toshiba Brave Lupus	Todd Blackadder	July 2026	Josh Syms	July 2026
Kobe Steelers	Dave Rennie	June 2026	Andy Ellis	August 2026
Toyota Verblitz	Steve Hansen	June 2026	Ian Foster	September 2026

Location of the 2026–27 Japan Rugby League teams
Location of the 2026–27 Japan Rugby League teams (Greater Tokyo Area)

=== International players ===
In the Japan Rugby League One, Category C players are internationally Test-capped players who are not eligible to represent Japan. There are three that are allowed in each teams matchday squad.

In September 2026, the Toshiba Brave Lupus announced the signing of a fourth Category C player. However, this signing was as an injury cover player, and he would not be eligible to play unless this circumstance were to occur.

2026–27 Japan Rugby League One – Division 1 Category C players
Club	Player 1	Player 2	Player 3
Black Rams Tokyo	Liam Gill	TJ Perenara	Paddy Ryan
Kobe Steelers	George Bridge	Brodie Retallick	Grant Williams
Kubota Spears	Malcolm Marx	Ruan Nortjé	Shaun Stevenson
Sagamihara DynaBoars	Lukhanyo Am	Kurt-Lee Arendse	Brad Weber
Saitama Wild Knights	Damian de Allende	Lood de Jager	Mark Nawaqanitawase
Shizuoka Blue Revs (Note: South African Test international Kwagga Smith was one of three Shizuoka Blue Revs Category C players under contract prior to the start of the 2026–27 season. However, in October 2026, the Blue Revs terminated Smith's contract by mutual consent. Australian Jock Campbell filled this slot upon his signing on 1 November 2026.)	Hunter Paisami	Semi Radradra	Jock Campbell
Tochigi Honda Heat	Tevita Ikanivere	Pablo Matera	Franco Mostert
Tokyo Sungoliath	Sam Cane	James Lowe	Sean McMahon
Toshiba Brave Lupus (Note: In September 2026, the Toshiba Brave Lupus announced the signing of a fourth Category C player, Atu Moli. The team announced that this signing was an injury cover, and he would not be eligible to play for the team in any other circumstance.)	Jack Dempsey	Aphelele Fassi	David Havili
Toyota Verblitz	Aaron Smith	Mark Tele'a	Pieter-Steph du Toit
Urayasu D-Rocks	Samu Kerevi	Jordan Petaia	Jasper Wiese
Yokohama Canon Eagles	Samipeni Finau	Jesse Kriel	Stephen Perofeta

== Ladder ==
Pos	Team	Pld	W	D	L	PF	PA	PD	TF	TA	TB	LB	Pts	Qualification or relegation
1	Black Rams Tokyo	0	0	0	0	0	0	0	0	0	0	0	0	Qualification to semi-finals
2	Kobe Steelers	0	0	0	0	0	0	0	0	0	0	0	0	Qualification to semi-finals
3	Kubota Spears	0	0	0	0	0	0	0	0	0	0	0	0	Qualification to quarter-finals
4	Sagamihara DynaBoars	0	0	0	0	0	0	0	0	0	0	0	0	Qualification to quarter-finals
5	Saitama Wild Knights	0	0	0	0	0	0	0	0	0	0	0	0	Qualification to quarter-finals
6	Shizuoka Blue Revs	0	0	0	0	0	0	0	0	0	0	0	0	Qualification to quarter-finals
7	Tochigi Honda Heat	0	0	0	0	0	0	0	0	0	0	0	0	
8	Tokyo Sungoliath	0	0	0	0	0	0	0	0	0	0	0	0	
9	Toshiba Brave Lupus	0	0	0	0	0	0	0	0	0	0	0	0	
10	Toyota Verblitz	0	0	0	0	0	0	0	0	0	0	0	0	
11	Urayasu D-Rocks	0	0	0	0	0	0	0	0	0	0	0	0	Qualification to relegation play-offs
12	Yokohama Canon Eagles	0	0	0	0	0	0	0	0	0	0	0	0	Qualification to relegation play-offs

Source: League One

== Fixtures ==
The season fixtures were released on 9 September 2026.

Home \ Away	RAM	STE	KUB	DYN	SWK	SBR	HEA	TSG	TBL	TOY	UDR	YCE
Black Rams Tokyo	—											
Kobe Steelers		—										
Kubota Spears			—									
Sagamihara DynaBoars				—								
Saitama Wild Knights					—							
Shizuoka Blue Revs						—						
Tochigi Honda Heat							—					
Tokyo Sungoliath								—				
Toshiba Brave Lupus									—			
Toyota Verblitz										—		
Urayasu D-Rocks											—	
Yokohama Canon Eagles												—

Source: League One
Legend: Blue = home team win; Yellow = draw; Red = away team win.

== Promotion/Relegation play-offs ==
The relegation play-offs format and dates were announced on 6 November 2026. The first round of fixtures were held on 21 May 2027, with the second round a week later (30 May).

=== Overview ===
Team 1	Agg.	Team 2	1st leg	2nd leg
TBD		TBD		
TBD		TBD		

== Play-offs ==
The season play-offs are scheduled for May and June 2027.

Quarter-finals
22 May
23 May

Semi-finals
29 May
30 May

Final
6 June – Tokyo
Third place match
7 June

=== Quarter-finals ===
22 May 2027
TBD JST (UTC+09)

v

23 May 2027
TBD JST (UTC+09)

v

=== Semi-finals ===
29 May 2027
TBD JST (UTC+09)

v

30 May 2027
TBD JST (UTC+09)

v

=== Third place match ===
5 June 2027
TBD JST (UTC+09)

v

=== Final ===
6 May 2027
TBD JST (UTC+09)

v

Japan National Stadium, Tokyo
