= Shunsuke Uenobo =

Shunsuke Uenobo 上ノ坊駿介
- Born: 29 September 2003 (age 23) Sanda, Hyōgo, Japan
- Height: 183 cm (6 ft 0 in)
- Weight: 82 kg (181 lb; 12 st 13 lb)
- University: Tenri University

Rugby union career
- Position(s): Fullback, Fly-half, Centre
- Current team: Kobelco Steelers
Youth career
- –2021: Iwami Chisuikan High School
- 2022–2026: Tenri University
Senior career
Years	Team	Apps	(Points)
2026–	Kobelco Steelers	14	(57)
- Correct as of 8 June 2026
International career
Years	Team	Apps	(Points)
2026	Japan U23	3	(0)
2026-	Japan	3	(0)
- Correct as of 14 April 2026

Shunsuke Uenobo (Japanese: 上ノ坊駿介, Uenobō Shunsuke; born 29 September 2003), is a Japanese professional rugby union player who currently plays as a fullback for the Kobe Steelers in the Japan Rugby League One (JRLO).

== Early life and youth career ==
Uenobo was born on 29 September 2003 in Sanda City, Hyōgo Prefecture. He began playing rugby at 4-years-old and attended Iwami Chisuikan High School in Shimane Prefecture, and later attending Tenri University.

In his first year at Tenri University (2022), Uenobo played five matches at fullback in the Kansai University Spring Tournament and the Kansai University League. He scored one try and kicked two penalty goals. Across 2023, 2024 and 2025, Uenobo played 30 matches in the Kansai University League, Spring Tournament, and the University Championships. Scoring 13 tries, he played across multiple positions in the backline, primarily fullback, centre, and fly-half. In his final season with Tenri University (2025), Uenobo's kicking significantly increased: kicking 35 conversions in seven games in the Kansai University League, and three conversions in Tenri's 21–26 defeat to Waseda University in the quarter-final of the 62nd University Rugby Championships.

== Professional career ==
Uenobo was selected for the Kobe Steelers squad ahead of the 2025–26 Japan Rugby League One season, joining the club under the league's "early entry" system while completing his final year at Tenri University. He made his debut on 7 February 2026, scoring a hat-trick of tries against the Shizuoka Blue Revs in a 60–45 win at the Kobe Universiade Memorial Stadium in the Suma-ku ward. Uenobo was praised by coach Dave Rennie following his outstanding debut performance. Rennie stated in the post-match press conference: "His performance today wasn't just about the three tries. He showed sharp movements and created space for the players around him. He was very strong with high balls, and his judgment in catching the ball near the touchline was excellent. And his tackles were good too". After the match it was reported by Rugby Republic that Uenobo was essentially the Japan Rugby League One's "number one draft pick" as he received contract offers from every club in the division.

Uenobo played fourteen games in his debut season for the Steelers, scoring another hat-trick against the Toyota Verblitz in April. Overall Uenobo scored 11 tries, all coming via fullback. In the Japan Rugby League One final, played against the previous seasons finalists the Kubota Spears, Uenobo started at fullback at the Japan National Stadium in Tokyo where he assisted the final try of the game with a grubber kick that was followed on by Inoke Burua to win the game 22–13 and seal their first JRLO title. At the post-season award ceremony, Uenobo won the Rookie of the Year award.

== Personal life ==
In 2026, Uenobo appeared on two episodes of Yomiuri Telecasting Corporation's program, "Athlete". Being interviewed by Japanese baseball veteran Takashi Toritani in the second episode, Uenobo discussed his debut season with the Kobe Steelers.

== Career statistics ==
=== Club ===
As of 7 June 2026.

Appearances and tries by club, season and competition
Club	Season	League			
Club	Season	Division	Apps	Tries	Points
Kobe Steelers	2025–26	Japan Rugby League One	14	11	55
Kobe Steelers	2026–27	Japan Rugby League One	TBD		
Kobe Steelers	Total		14	11	55

== Awards and honours ==
Kobe Steelers

- Japan Rugby League One: 2025–26

Individual

- Japan Rugby League One Rookie of the Year: 2025–26
