= 2022–23 Japan Rugby League One – Division 1 =

Rugby union competition in Japan

2022–23 Japan Rugby League One – D1
- Countries: Japan
- Number of teams: 12
- Date: 17 December 2022 – 20 May 2023
- Champions: Spears Tokyo Bay
- Runners-up: Saitama Wild Knights
- Promoted: Hanazono Liners; Sagamihara DynaBoars
- Relegated: Green Rockets Tokatsu
- Matches played: 106
- Attendance: 647,420 (average 6,108 per match)
- Highest attendance: 41,794 (Saitama Wild Knights vs. Spears Tokyo Bay, 20 May 2023)
- Top point scorer: Bernard Foley (173)
- Top try scorer: Seiya Ozaki (18)

Official website
- league-one.jp/en

The 2022–23 Japan Rugby League One – Division 1 season was the twentieth top flight league season played from December 2022 through to May 2023, in the newly rebranded Japan Rugby League One. The competition consisted of twelve teams, including two promoted teams from Division 2, Sagamihara Dynaboars and Hanazono Liners.

== Format ==
The format and schedule was announced on 16 September 2022. It consisted of a round-robin fixture, before entering into a knockout style play-off for the final four teams. It featured two conferences (A, B). Teams in each conference played the teams in their respective conference twice (one at home, one away), and six matches against all the teams in the other conference, three being at home and three away. Each team played a total of sixteen seasonal fixtures, plus additional play-off matches, including relegation play-offs.

== Teams and personnel ==
Club	Prefecture	Coach	Stadium	Capacity
Black Rams Tokyo リコーブラックラムズ東京	Tokyo	Peter Hewat	Komazawa Olympic Park Stadium	20,010
Green Rockets Tokatsu; NECグリーンロケッツ東葛	Chiba	Robert Taylor	Kashiwanoha Stadium	20,000
Hanazono Liners 花園近鉄ライナーズ	Osaka	Yoshitake Mizuma	Hanazono Rugby Stadium	30,000
Kobe Steelers コベルコ神戸スティーラーズ	Hyōgo	Nick Holten	Noevir Stadium Kobe	30,132
Spears Tokyo Bay クボタスピアーズ船橋・東京ベイ	Chiba	Frans Ludeke	Edogawa Stadium	6,950
Sagamihara DynaBoars 三菱重工相模原ダイナボアーズ	Kanagawa	Glenn Delaney	Sagamihara Gion Stadium	15,300
Saitama Wild Knights 埼玉パナソニックワイルドナイツ	Saitama	Robbie Deans	Kumagaya Rugby Ground	24,000
Shizuoka Blue Revs 静岡ブルーレヴズ	Shizuoka	Naoya Okubo	Yamaha Stadium	15,165
Tokyo Sungoliath 東京サントリーサンゴリアス	Tokyo	Milton Haig	Chichibunomiya Rugby Stadium	27,188
Brave Lupus Tokyo 東芝ブレイブルーパス東京	Tokyo	Todd Blackadder	Ajinomoto Stadium	49,970
Toyota Verblitz トヨタヴェルブリッツ	Aichi	Ben Herring	Paloma Mizuho Rugby Stadium	15,000
Yokohama Eagles 横浜キヤノンイーグルス	Kanagawa	Keisuke Sawaki	Nissan Stadium (Yokohama)	72,400

=== Personnel changes ===
Club	Outgoing coach	Date of vacancy	Incoming coach	Date of appointment	Ref.
Kobe Steelers コベルコ神戸スティーラーズ	Dave Dillon	August 2022	Nick Holten	August 2022	
Sagamihara Dynaboars 三菱重工相模原ダイナボアーズ	Greg Cooper	June 2022	Glenn Delaney	July 2022	
Toyota Verblitz トヨタヴェルブリッツ	Simon Cron	March 2022	Ben Herring	August 2022	

Locations of the 2022–23 Division 1 teams
2022–23 Division 1 teams in Greater Tokyo Area

== Ladder ==
Pos	Team	Pld	W	D	L	PF	PA	PD	TF	TA	TB	LB	Pts	Qualification or relegation
1	Saitama Wild Knights	16	15	0	1	539	270	+269	69	32	6	0	66	Qualification for Play-off Semi-finals
2	Spears Tokyo Bay (C)	16	14	1	1	636	340	+296	84	47	7	0	65	Qualification for Play-off Semi-finals
3	Tokyo Sungoliath	16	12	0	4	529	325	+204	72	39	5	2	55	Qualification for Play-off Semi-finals
4	Yokohama Eagles	16	10	2	4	588	321	+267	84	43	7	3	54	Qualification for Play-off Semi-finals
5	Brave Lupus Tokyo	16	10	0	6	558	394	+164	75	52	6	2	48	
6	Toyota Verblitz	16	8	0	8	468	449	+19	62	59	2	3	37	
7	Black Rams Tokyo	16	6	0	10	414	384	+30	56	43	2	4	30	
8	Shizuoka Blue Revs	16	5	2	9	404	403	+1	55	48	3	3	30	
9	Kobe Steelers	16	5	0	11	470	569	−99	66	74	3	2	25	
10	Sagamihara DynaBoars (O)	16	4	1	11	360	609	−249	45	80	1	1	20	Qualification for relegation play-offs
11	Green Rockets Tokatsu (R)	16	3	0	13	295	640	−345	45	94	1	1	14	Qualification for relegation play-offs
12	Hanazono Liners (O)	16	1	0	15	297	854	−557	41	129	0	1	5	Qualification for relegation play-offs

Updated to match(es) played on unknown. Source:
Rules for classification: 1) Points; 2) Number of wins; 3) Point difference
(C) Champion; (O) Play-off winner(s); (R) Relegated

== Fixtures ==
Each team were to play five teams twice and six teams once for a total of sixteen home and away matches.

Home \ Away	BRT	GRT	HKL	KKS	KSP	MSD	SWK	SBR	SUN	TBL	TV	YCE
Black Rams Tokyo	—		64–10	41–26		8–34	17–38	15–19	7–18	10–12	34–36	
Green Rockets Tokatsu	7–54	—	36–34	33–43	17–59		0–45		7–32	20–49		17–45
Hanazono Liners		26–43	—	34–33	12–77	29–38		14–34	10–51		24–62	7–74
Kobe Steelers		59–26	58–36	—	14–23		10–48	32–29	19–39		21–38	26–52
Spears Tokyo Bay	40–38	40–7	55–17	25–21	—	60–22			39–24	46–27		15–5
Sagamihara DynaBoars	21–31	26–33		30–49		—	29–61	27–27		23–19	27–25	21–41
Saitama Wild Knights	25–12		41–6		30–15	40–5	—	25–44		22–19	34–19	21–19
Shizuoka Blue Revs	22–34	21–0			27–40	30–20	14–15	—	17–25	29–37	27–37	
Tokyo Sungoliath		50–19	64–12	25–17	18–31	51–13	29–41		—		20–27	32–23
Brave Lupus Tokyo	17–7		60–14	51–12		52–19	22–34	29–16	34–40	—	63–25	
Toyota Verblitz	25–29	21–18			34–44	53–5	10–19	31–26		18–19	—	7–39
Yokohama Eagles	34–13	36–12	64–12	39–30	27–27			22–22	9–11	59–48		—

Updated to match(es) played on 23 April 2023. Source: league-one.jp
Legend: Blue = home team win; Yellow = draw; Red = away team win.

== Promotion/Relegation play-offs ==
The relegation play-offs took place between 5 May and 14 May 2023.

=== Overview ===
Team 1	Agg.	Team 2	1st leg	2nd leg
(D1) Sagamihara DynaBoars	102 - 35	Shuttles Aichi (D2)	59 - 21	43 - 14
(D1) Green Rockets Tokatsu	41 - 47	Mie Heat (D2)	29 - 34	12 - 13
(D1) Hanazono Liners	92 - 36	Urayasu D-Rocks (D2)	36 - 14	56 - 22

=== Matches ===
All times Japan Standard Time (JST) (UTC+9)

Sagamihara DynaBoars v Shuttles Aichi

6 May 2023
14:30 JST (UTC+9)

Shuttles Aichi	21-59	Sagamihara DynaBoars
Try: Go Nakano 27' c Joe Kamana 51' c Talifolofola Tangipa 71' c Con: Tim Swiel (3/3) 28' 52' 72'	Report	Try: Honeti Taumohaapai (2) 5' m 10' c Masataka Tsuruya 13' c Kota Iwamura (2) 19' c 35' c Tomoaki Ishii 29' c Walt Steenkamp 47' c Satoshi Koizumi 66' m Ryoto Shibata 80' c Con: Matt To'omua (7/9) 12' 15' 20' 31' 48' 77' 80+2'

Paloma Mizuho Stadium
Attendance: 2,266

14 May 2023
14:30 JST (UTC+9)

Sagamihara DynaBoars	43-14	Shuttles Aichi
Try: Masataka Tsuruya 3' c Yusuke Sakamoto (2) 13' m 20' c Nozomi Nara 36' m Curtis Rona 56' c Yoshimitsu Yasue 76' m Matt To'omua 80+1' c Con: Matt To'omua (3/6) 4' 22' 57'; Heiden Bedwell-Curtis (1/1) 80+2'	Report	Try: Go Nakano 27' c James Mollentze 52' c Con: Josh Matavesi (1/1) 27'; James Mollentze (1/1) 53'

TBC
Attendance: 1,406

Green Rockets Tokatsu v Mie Heat

5 May 2023
12:00 JST (UTC+9)

Mie Heat	34-29	Green Rockets Tokatsu
Try: Yoshikazu Fujita 2' c Ryo Furuta 15' c Matthys Basson 39' c Viliami Afu Kaipouli 71' c Con: Kaleb Trask (4/4) 3' 16' 40' 72'; Pen: Kaleb Trask (2/2) 27' 29'	Report	Try: Teruya Goto (2) 31' m 61' m Nick Phipps 46' c Lomano Lemeki 54' c Aseri Masivou 80' m Con: Taisetsu Kanai (2/4) 47' 55'; Lomano Lemeki (0/1)

Mie Suzuka Sports Garden
Attendance: 3,128

13 May 2022
12:00 JST (UTC+9)

Green Rockets Tokatsu	12-13	Mie Heat
Try: Kavaia Tagivetaua 47' m Lomano Lemeki 70' c Con: Taisetsu Kanai (0/1); Lomano Lemeki (1/1) 71'	Report	Try: Dawid Kellerman 28' c Con: Kaleb Trask (1/1) 29'; Pen: Kaleb Trask (2/2) 13' 63'

Kashiwanoha Stadium
Attendance: 2,018

Hanazono Liners v Urayasu D-Rocks

7 May 2023
12:00 JST (UTC+9)

Urayasu D-Rocks	14-36	Hanazono Liners
Try: Ren Iinuma 5'c Israel Folau 67' c Con: Otere Black (1/1) 6'; Greig Laidlaw (1/1) 68'	Report	Try: Semisi Masirewa 11'; Kenta Tanaka 14' c Takahiro Hayashi 39' c Shohei Nonaka 45' c Jackson Garden-Bachop 75' c Con: Semisi Masirewa (2/3) 15' 40'; Jackson Garden-Bachop (2/2) 46' 76'; Pen: Jackson Garden-Bachop (1/1) 64'

Yurtec Stadium Sendai
Attendance: 2,360

13 May 2022
12:00 JST (UTC+9)

Hanazono Liners	56-21	Urayasu D-Rocks
Try: Sanaila Waqa 5' c Siosaia Fifita (3) 10' m 63' m 68' m Will Genia 25' m Semisi Masirewa 34' c Quade Cooper 61' c Kensho Kawamura 72' c Tsuyoshi Murata 74' m Con: Semisi Masirewa (2/5) 6' 35'; Will Genia (1/1) 62'; Jackson Garden-Bachop (1/2) 73'; Waimana Riedlinger-Kapa (0/1); Pen: Semisi Masirewa (1/1) 23'	Report	Try: Takuhei Yasuda 31' c Kai Ishii 40+2' c Penalty Try 44'; Con: Hayden Cripps (2/2) 32' 40+3'

Hanazono Rugby Stadium
Attendance: 5,459

== Season play-offs ==
Bracket

Semi-finals
13 May – Aoyama (Tokyo)
Saitama Wild Knights	51
Yokohama Eagles	20
14 May – Aoyama (Tokyo)
Spears Tokyo Bay	24
Tokyo Sungoliath	18

Final
20 May – Shinjuku (Tokyo)
Saitama Wild Knights	15
Spears Tokyo Bay	17
Third place
19 May – Aoyama (Tokyo)
Yokohama Eagles	26
Tokyo Sungoliath	20

=== Semi-finals ===
13 May 2023
14:35 JST (UTC+9)

Saitama Wild Knights	51-20	Yokohama Eagles
Try: Marika Koroibete (3) 42' c 53' c 71' m Dylan Riley 57' c Shota Horie 76' c Con: Rikiya Matsuda (3/3) 43' 54' 58'; Takuya Yamasawa (1/2) 78'; Pen: Rikiya Matsuda (5/5) 18' 23' 29' 40+2' 43'; Drop: Rikiya Matsuda 35'	Report	Try: Sione Halasili 14' c Inoke Burua 20' c Con: Yu Tamura (2/2) 15' 22'; Pen: Junpei Ogura (1/1) 51'; Drop: Yu Tamura 38'

Chichibunomiya Rugby Stadium
Attendance: 16,237

14 May 2022
14:00 JST (UTC+9)

Spears Tokyo Bay	24-18	Tokyo Sungoliath
Try: Yota Kamimori 24' c Malcolm Marx 56' c Bernard Foley 77' c Con: Bernard Foley (3/3) 25' 57' 78'; Pen: Bernard Foley (1/3) 47'	Report	Try: Tevita Li 30' c Aaron Cruden 80' m Con: Aaron Cruden (1/2) 31'; Pen: Aaron Cruden (2/4) 16' 54'

Chichibunomiya Rugby Stadium
Attendance: 13,065

=== 3rd Place Playoff ===
19 May 2023
19:00 JST (UTC+9)

Yokohama Eagles	26-20	Tokyo Sungoliath
Try: Chihito Matsui (2) 15' c 66' c Faf de Klerk 46' m Sione Halasili 57' c Con: Yu Tamura (1/2) 17'; Junpei Ogura (2/2) 58' 68'; Pen: SP Marais (1/1) 79'	Report	Try: Taiga Ozaki 4' m Naoki Ozawa 30' c Shunta Nakamura 61' m Con: Aaron Cruden (1/3) 31'; Pen: Aaron Cruden (1/1) 20'

Chichibunomiya Rugby Stadium
Attendance: 8,270

=== Final ===
20 May 2023
14:35 JST (UTC+9)

Saitama Wild Knights	15 - 17	Spears Tokyo Bay
Try: Shota Horie 58' c Tomoki Osada 65' m Con: Takuya Yamasawa (1/2) 59'; Pen: Rikiya Matsuda (1/2) 34'	Report	Try: Haruto Kida 69' m Con: Bernard Foley (0/1); Pen: Harumichi Tatekawa (0/1); Bernard Foley (3/4) 20' 26' 38'

Japan National Stadium
Attendance: 41,794

FB	15	Ryuji Noguchi
RW	14	Tomoki Osada
OC	13	Dylan Riley
IC	12	Damian de Allende
LW	11	Marika Koroibete
FH	10	Rikiya Matsuda
SH	9	Keisuke Uchida
N8	8	Jack Cornelsen
OF	7	Lachlan Boshier
BF	6	Shota Fukui
RL	5	Lood de Jager
LL	4	Mark Abbott
TP	3	Asaeli Ai Valu
HK	2	Atsushi Sakate (c)
LP	1	Keita Inagaki
Substitutions:
HK	16	Shota Horie
PR	17	Craig Millar
PR	18	Shohei Hirano
LK	19	Liam Mitchell
FL	20	Itsuki Onishi
SH	21	Taiki Koyama
FH	22	Takuya Yamasawa
CE	23	Koki Takeyama
Coach:
Robbie Deans

FB	15	Gerhard van den Heever
RW	14	Koga Nezuka
OC	13	Ryan Crotty
IC	12	Harumichi Tatekawa (c)
LW	11	Haruto Kida
FH	10	Bernard Foley
SH	9	Kazuhiro Taniguchi
N8	8	Faulua Makisi
OF	7	Takeo Suenaga
BF	6	Finau Tupa
RL	5	Ruan Botha
LL	4	Yuki Aoki
TP	3	Kengo Kitagawa
HK	2	Malcolm Marx
LP	1	Yota Kamimori
Substitutions:
HK	16	Schalk Erasmus
PR	17	Kazuki Kato
PR	18	Opeti Helu
LK	19	Uwe Helu
FL	20	Masaya Tamaki
SH	21	Shinobu Fujiwara
FH	22	Sione Teaupa
CE	23	Halatoa Vailea
Coach:
Frans Ludeke
