= Tiennan Costley =

Tiennan Costley ティエナン・コストリー
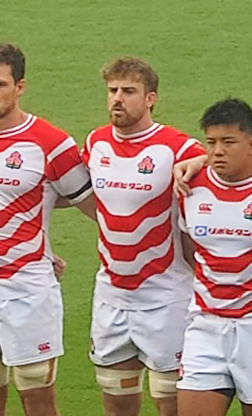
- Costley (centre) with Japan in 2026
- Born: 14 June 2000 (age 26) Auckland, New Zealand (Note: Both Costley's club, the Kobe Steelers, and the Japan Rugby Football Union (JRFU), state that Costley was born in New Zealand. However, several sources state that his birthplace is Australia.)
- Height: 192 cm (6 ft 4 in)
- Weight: 102 kg (225 lb; 16 st 1 lb)
- School: Westlake Boys High School
- University: International Pacific University

Rugby union career
- Position(s): Flanker, Number 8, Wing
- Current team: Kobelco Steelers
Youth career
- 2017–2018: North Harbour U18
- 2020–2022: International Pacific University
Senior career
Years	Team	Apps	(Points)
2023–	Kobelco Steelers	58	(70)
- Correct as of 7 June 2026
International career
Years	Team	Apps	(Points)
2024–2026	Japan XV	2	(0)
2024–	Japan	23	(5)
- Correct as of 14 November 2026

Tiennan Costley (Japanese: ティエナン・コストリー, romanized: Tienan Kosutorī; born 14 June 2000), nicknamed "Tama" in the Māori language (English: Boy), is a professional rugby union player who plays as a flanker for the Kobe Steelers in the Japan Rugby League One (JRLO) and the Japan national team.

== Early life ==
Costley was born in 2000 and raised in New Zealand. He was educated at Auckland's Westlake Boys High School, playing rugby at the school alongside future England player Chandler Cunningham-South.

== Career ==
=== Early career ===
In 2017, Costley had been named in the North Harbour U18 squad.

After graduating from Westlake Boys High School in Auckland, Costley originally hoped to progress through New Zealand rugby and eventually play for the All Blacks, with the first goal of making the Canterbury Academy, one of New Zealand's top rugby academies. After missing out on the Canterbury Academy, he was offered a place at IPU Kanto Pacific University in Japan. During a visit to the university with his mother, Costley was impressed by the facilities and welcoming environment, and eventually chose to move to Japan and continue his rugby career abroad.

After arriving in Japan, Costley began playing in the lower-level university competition for IPU. He played a total of seven matches across 2020, 2021, and 2022, captaining the team in his final year in their first ever appearance in the All-Japan University Rugby Championship, the highest level of youth competition in Japanese schools.

=== Kobe Steelers ===
In January 2023, Costley, alongside Hayato Fukunishi, were announced as the latest signings for the Kobe Steelers. At the time, the Steelers had been in the early stages of their 2022–23 season. By March, and nearing the end of the season, Costley had made his senior debut for the Steelers, after an injury to regular back rower Marcell Coetzee.

For the 2023–24 season, Costley started as the number eight in Kobe's first ten games of the season, scoring four tries. Alongside back row teammate Ardie Savea, Costley became one of the Steelers' top loose forwards, excelling while carrying the ball, making linebreaks, as well as at the breakdown.

The following year, Costley remained a regular starter, though his usual role varied. Similar to his responsibilities with the Japan national team, he featured across all three back row positions. While he was deployed most frequently on the blindside (No. 6) and openside (No. 7), he also made a solitary appearance at number eight.

In 2025–26, Costley was the Steeler's starting blindside flanker, playing in the position in all but one of their games throughout their title-winning campaign. Costley played a significant defensive role for the Steelers, alongside Ardie Savea. He racked up 245 tackles, the second-best in the league, with a success rate of 86.6%, ranking him among the top ten in the competition. He was also one of the league leaders in carry metres, defenders beaten, post-contact metres, line breaks, as well as turnovers. Following the regular season, Costley won the "Best Tackler Award". The Steelers went on to win the Japan Rugby League One title, defeating the Kubota Spears 22–13 at the Japan National Stadium in Tokyo. At the post-season awards, Costley was named in the league's best XV squad alongside teammate Ardie Savea.

== International career ==
In January 2024, Costley was named in a Japan training camp by coach Eddie Jones. In May, following the 2023–24 JRLO season, he was named in another training camp ahead of Japan's Tests in the June–July international window. In June 2024, Costley was named in Japan's starting squad to play England at the National Stadium. Costley made his Test debut on 22 June 2024. Japan lost 17–52.

The following July, Costley played in one of the Japan XV's two matches against the Māori All Blacks, coming off the bench in the 50th minute. He made another Test cap for Japan against Georgia a week later, although played just 16 minutes.

In August and September 2024, Costley, with two Test caps, was named in Japan's 35-man squad for the 2024 Pacific Nations Cup. Costley played in all four of their matches, although had been made a replacement for Amato Fakatava in the latter stage of the tournament after starting in their opening pool stage matches against the United States and Canada. Japan lost the final to Fiji at Hanazono Rugby Stadium in Osaka.

Despite not being in Japan's squad for their two-Tests against Wales, Costley was later named in their 37-man squad for the second edition of the Pacific Nations Cup. Costley played less than twenty minutes a match in three Tests, and made a further two caps for Japan in the 2025 Autumn International window against Australia and South Africa respectively. In the latter match, Costley was reported to have been used as a "hybrid player", covering the wing position when he was substituted on.

In July 2026, Costley played in all three of Japan's Nations Championship Tests, which inlcuded an equal record win over Italy in the opening round.

== Career statistics ==
=== Club ===
As of 7 June 2026.

Appearances and tries by club, season and competition
Club	Season	League			
Club	Season	Division	Apps	Tries	Points
Kobe Steelers	2022–23	Japan Rugby League One	5	0	0
Kobe Steelers	2023–24	Japan Rugby League One	16	4	20
Kobe Steelers	2024–25	Japan Rugby League One	18	3	15
Kobe Steelers	2025–26	Japan Rugby League One	19	7	35
Kobe Steelers	Total		58	14	70

=== International ===
As of 18 July 2026.

Statistics by team and year
Team	Year	Statistic		
Team	Year	Apps	Tries	Points
Japan XV	2024	1	0	0
Japan XV	2026	1	0	0
Total		2	0	0
Japan	2024	6	0	0
Japan	2025	5	0	0
Japan	2026	3	0	0
Total		14	0	0

=== International tries ===
List of international tries scored by Tiennan Costley
No.	Opponent	Location	Competition	Date	Result	Ref.
1	Canada	Denka Big Swan Stadium, Niigata	2026 Autumn Internationals	5 September 2026	57–12	

== Awards and honours ==
Kobe Steelers

- Japan Rugby League One: 2025–26

Individual

- Japan Rugby League One Best XV: 2025–26
- Japan Rugby League One Best Tackler Award: 2025–26
