= 2007 Top League Challenge Series =

Rugby union competition in Japan

- Countries: Japan
- Date: 14 – 27 January 2007
- Champions: Kyuden Voltex (1st title)
- Runners-up: Mitsubishi Sagamihara DynaBoars
- Promoted: Kyuden Voltex; Mitsubishi Dynaboars
- Matches played: 6

The 2007 Top League Challenge Series was the 2007 edition of the Top League Challenge Series, a second-tier rugby union competition in Japan, in which teams from regionalised leagues competed for promotion to the Top League for the 2007–08 season. The competition was contested from 14 to 27 January 2007.

Kyuden Voltex and Mitsubishi Sagamihara DynaBoars won promotion to the 2007–08 Top League, while Honda Heat and Kintetsu Liners progressed to the promotion play-offs.

== Competition rules and information ==
The top two teams from the regional Top East League, Top West League and Top Kyūshū League qualified to the Top League Challenge Series. The regional league winners participated in Challenge 1, while the runners-up participated in Challenge 2.

The top two teams in Challenge 1 won automatic promotion to the 2007–08 Top League, while the third-placed team in Challenge 1 and the Challenge 2 winner qualified to the promotion play-offs.

== Qualification ==
The teams qualified to the Challenge 1 and Challenge 2 series through the 2006 regional leagues.

=== Top West League ===
The final standings for the 2006 Top West League were:

2006 Top West League standings
Pos	Team	P	W	D	L	PF	PA	PD	TB	LB	Pts
1	Kintetsu Liners	8	8	0	0	676	81	+595	8	0	40
2	Honda Heat	8	7	0	1	583	96	+487	6	0	34
3	Toyota Industries Shuttles	8	6	0	2	553	127	+426	6	0	30
4	NTT DoCoMo Red Hurricanes	8	5	0	3	488	154	+334	6	2	28
5	Osaka Police	8	4	0	4	285	206	+79	4	0	20
6	Chubu Electric Power	8	3	0	5	225	360	−135	4	0	16
7	Mitsubishi Red Evolutions	8	2	0	6	145	522	−377	2	1	11
8	Unitika Phoenix	8	1	0	7	83	607	−524	1	0	5
9	Zentsuji SDF RFC (P)	8	0	0	8	12	897	−885	0	0	0
Legend: P = Games played, W = Games won, D = Games drawn, L = Games lost, PF = Points for, PA = Points against, PD = Points difference, TB = Try bonus points, LB = Losing bonus points, Pts = Log points. (P) indicates a team newly promoted from lower leagues.

- Kintetsu Liners qualified for Challenge 1.
- Honda Heat qualified for Challenge 2.
- Zentsuji SDF RFC, Mitsubishi Red Evolutions and Unitika Phoenix were all relegated to lower leagues.

=== Top East League ===
The final standings for the 2006 Top East League were:

2006 Top East League standings
Pos	Team	P	W	D	L	PF	PA	PD	TB	LB	Pts
1	Mitsubishi Sagamihara DynaBoars	10	10	0	0	537	114	+423	9	0	49
2	Tokyo Gas	10	9	0	1	389	191	+198	8	0	44
3	NTT Communications Shining Arcs	10	8	0	2	384	137	+247	7	1	40
4	Yokogawa Musashino Atlastars	10	7	0	3	299	236	+63	6	0	34
5	Kurita Water	10	6	0	4	273	255	+18	5	1	30
6	Kamaishi Seawaves	10	5	0	5	277	294	−17	8	1	29
7	Suntory Foods	10	4	0	6	259	251	+8	5	3	24
8	Shimizu Blue Sharks	10	3	0	7	159	304	−145	2	1	15
9	JAL Wings	10	1	0	9	220	436	−216	3	2	9
10	Akita Northern Bullets	10	1	0	9	191	407	−216	3	1	8
11	Insurance Meiji Life Yasuda	10	1	0	9	119	482	−363	1	0	5
Legend: P = Games played, W = Games won, D = Games drawn, L = Games lost, PF = Points for, PA = Points against, PD = Points difference, TB = Try bonus points, LB = Losing bonus points, Pts = Log points (P) indicates a team newly promoted from lower leagues.

- Mitsubishi Sagamihara DynaBoars qualified for Challenge 1.
- Tokyo Gas qualified for Challenge 2 after a play-off match against NTT Communications Shining Arcs.

The following match was played:

Round 1	24 December 2006	Tokyo Gas	41–31	NTT Communications Shining Arcs

=== Top Kyūshū League ===
The final standings for the 2006 Top Kyūshū League were:

2006 Top Kyūshū League First Phase standings
Pos	Team	P	W	D	L	PF	PA	PD	TB	LB	Pts
1	Kyuden Voltex	5	5	0	0	466	24	+442	5	0	25
2	Mazda Blue Zoomers	5	4	0	1	243	106	+137	4	0	20
3	Chugoku Electric Power	5	2	1	2	149	171	−22	4	1	15
4	Mitsubishi Heavy Industries	5	2	1	2	105	184	−79	3	0	13
5	JR Kyūshū Thunders	5	1	0	4	102	274	−172	2	1	7
6	Mitsubishi Mizushima	5	0	0	5	34	330	−296	0	0	0
Legend: P = Games played, W = Games won, D = Games drawn, L = Games lost, PF = Points for, PA = Points against, PD = Points difference, TB = Try bonus points, LB = Losing bonus points, Pts = Log points.

- Chugoku Electric Power, Kyuden Voltex and Mazda Blue Zoomers qualified to the Second Phase.

2006 Top Kyūshū League Second Phase standings
Pos	Team	P	W	D	L	PF	PA	PD	TB	LB	Pts
1	Kyuden Voltex	2	2	0	0	145	3	+142	2	0	10
2	Mazda Blue Zoomers	2	1	0	1	57	72	−15	1	0	5
3	Chugoku Electric Power	2	0	0	2	14	141	−127	0	0	0
Legend: P = Games played, W = Games won, D = Games drawn, L = Games lost, PF = Points for, PA = Points against, PD = Points difference, TB = Try bonus points, LB = Losing bonus points, Pts = Log points.

- Kyuden Voltex qualified for Challenge 1.
- Mazda Blue Zoomers qualified for Challenge 2.

== Challenge 1 ==
=== Standings ===
The final standings for the 2007 Top League Challenge 1 were:

2007 Top League Challenge 1 standings
Pos	Team	P	W	D	L	PF	PA	PD	TB	LB	Pts
1	Kyuden Voltex	2	2	0	0	90	33	+57	2	0	10
2	Mitsubishi Sagamihara DynaBoars	2	1	0	1	44	80	−36	1	0	5
3	Kintetsu Liners	2	0	0	2	52	73	−21	1	1	2
Legend: P = Games played, W = Games won, D = Games drawn, L = Games lost, PF = Points for, PA = Points against, PD = Points difference, TB = Try bonus points, LB = Losing bonus points, Pts = Log points.

- Kyuden Voltex and Mitsubishi Sagamihara DynaBoars won promotion to the 2007–08 Top League.
- Kintetsu Liners progressed to the promotion play-offs.

=== Matches ===
The following matches were played in the 2007 Top League Challenge 1:

14 January 2007	Mitsubishi Sagamihara DynaBoars	12–49	Kyuden Voltex

21 January 2007	Kyuden Voltex	41–21	Kintetsu Liners

27 January 2007	Kintetsu Liners	31–32	Mitsubishi Sagamihara DynaBoars

== Challenge 2 ==
=== Standings ===
The final standings for the 2007 Top League Challenge 2 were:

2007 Top League Challenge 2 standings
Pos	Team	P	W	D	L	PF	PA	PD	TB	LB	Pts
1	Honda Heat	2	2	0	0	128	44	+84	2	0	10
2	Tokyo Gas	2	1	0	1	112	66	+46	2	0	6
3	Mazda Blue Zoomers	2	0	0	2	22	152	−130	0	0	0
Legend: P = Games played, W = Games won, D = Games drawn, L = Games lost, PF = Points for, PA = Points against, PD = Points difference, TB = Try bonus points, LB = Losing bonus points, Pts = Log points.

- Honda Heat progressed to the promotion play-offs.

=== Matches ===
The following matches were played in the 2006 Top League Challenge 2:

14 January 2007	Tokyo Gas	78–12	Mazda Blue Zoomers

21 January 2007	Mazda Blue Zoomers	10–74	Honda Heat

27 January 2007	Honda Heat	54–34	Tokyo Gas

== See also ==
- 2006–07 Top League
- Top League Challenge Series
