= Nick Holten =

Rugby player (born 1973)

- Full name: Nicholas Paul Holten
- Born: 10 March 1973 (age 53) Hamilton, New Zealand
- Height: 6 ft 4 in (193 cm)
- Weight: 238 lb (108 kg)

Rugby union career
- Position: Flanker
Provincial / State sides
Years	Team	Apps	(Points)
1995–00	Waikato	33	(40)
Super Rugby
Years	Team	Apps	(Points)
1998–00	Chiefs	20	(0)
International career
Years	Team	Apps	(Points)
1998	Netherlands	2	(0)
Coaching career
- Years: Team
- 2022–23: Kobelco Kobe Steelers

Nicholas Paul Holten (born 10 March 1973) is a New Zealand former professional rugby union player.

== Early life ==
Born to Dutch immigrant parents in Hamilton, Holten is the third youngest of 14 siblings and was raised on a dairy farm in the community of Orini. He picked up rugby during his schoolboy years in Fairfield. While working as a drainlayer in 1994, Holten had his right hand crushed between pipes in a workplace accident, leaving four of his fingers mangled. Doctors were able to save his hand, though he continued to have hampered movement in two middle fingers.

== Rugby union career ==
A flanker, Holten made his debut for Waikato in 1995. He briefly tried his hand at a code switch two years later when he joined Australian rugby league club Canterbury Bulldogs. Returning to rugby union, Holten played under former All Black Geoff Old on the Netherlands national team in 1998, for a series of Rugby World Cup qualifying matches. He competed for the Chiefs between 1998 and 2000, making 20 appearances in Super 12 competition.

Holten played for several years in Japan with Toshiba Brave Lupus and afterwards moved into coaching. He replaced countryman Dave Dillon as head coach of the Kobelco Kobe Steelers for their 2022–23 Japan Rugby League One campaign, then stood aside after season as the club recruited former Wallabies coach Dave Rennie.
