= Brackenfell High School =

- Hoërskool Brackenfell

Location
- Rogland Street; Brackenfell, Western Cape, 7560; South Africa
- Coordinates: 33°52′17.5″S 18°41′13.4″E

Information
- Type: Public high school
- Motto: Latin: Altiora Spero (I hope higher things)
- Established: 26 January 1976
- Principal: Jannie Muller
- Gender: Co-educational
- Website: www.brakkies.co.za

Brackenfell High School (Afrikaans: Hoërskool Brackenfell) is a public, co-educational high school in Brackenfell, Western Cape, South Africa. It was established on 26 January 1976 on a 1-acre (0.40 ha) plot of land donated by Janet Brink, the widow of Andries Brink.

== Controversies ==
In 2002 parents complained that "demeaning and humiliating" hazing practices were being practiced at the school by some students.

=== 2020 protest ===
In November 2020, the school was the site of repeated protest action by the Economic Freedom Fighters (EFF). The EFF alleged that a parent-organised function for Brackenfell High School students on 17 October 2020 was a whites only event and that presence of two teachers at the private venue was an indication of support for this event. All of the 42 students who attended the event were white.

After damage to an EFF vehicle during an initial protest on 6 November 2020, a small EFF protest was held on the 9 November 2020 resulting in a scuffle with local residents during which some EFF members were assaulted and threatened by Brackenfell residents. Ten days later the Pan-African Congress also staged a small protest in support of the EFF outside the school. The incident was the subject of a parliamentary debate on 19 November during which ANC MP Mondli Gungubele called for calm.

On the 20 November 2020 the EFF organised a larger protest outside the school comprising an estimated 2,000 protestors. A smaller counter protest organised by the Cape Party was also staged on the same day. An Instagram page was started with over 100 stories of racism faced by current and former students of the school.

A report by the WCED (Western Cape Education Department) cleared the school of racial exclusion claims.

== Notable alumni ==
- Andriëtte Norman, singer
- Cheslin Kolbe, rugby player
- Courtnall Skosan, rugby player, He became Brackenfell High Schools first ever Springbok rugby player in history in 2017 when he was selected against France.
- Dane Paterson, South African Test and ODI cricketer
