= Asipeli Moala =

Tongan rugby union player

- Born: 29 June 1998 (age 28) Tonga
- Height: 1.85 m (6 ft 1 in)
- Weight: 115 kg (18 st 2 lb; 254 lb)
- School: Japan Aviation High School
- University: Tenri University

Rugby union career
- Position: Lock / Flanker / Number 8
- Current team: Kubota Spears
Senior career
Years	Team	Apps	(Points)
2020	Sunwolves	0	(0)
2022–	Kubota Spears	16	(5)
- Correct as of 3 November 2025
International career
Years	Team	Apps	(Points)
2018	Japan U20	5	(0)
- Correct as of 3 November 2025

Asipeli Moala (アシペリ・モアラ, Ashiperi moara; born 29 June 1998) is a Tongan rugby union player who plays as a lock, flanker or number 8. He currently plays for Kubota Spears in Japan's domestic Japan Rugby League One.

== Early career ==
Moala is from Tonga before moving to Japan for schooling, where he attended Japan Aviation High School. After school, he moved to Japan to study at Tenri University where he also played rugby between 2018 and 2022. Having been schooled in Japan and being eligible on residency grounds, he represented Japan at U19 level, scoring a hat-trick against Ireland, In the same year he represented Japan U2O.

== Professional career ==
While still a university student, Moala signed for the Japanese Super Rugby side the Sunwolves, being named as part of their squad for the 2020 Super Rugby season. He did not make an appearance for the side. After graduating he signed for the Kubota Spears in 2022. Having made ten appearances over his first two seasons, Moala missed the majority of the 2025 season through injury.
