= Michael Kasprowicz =

Australian cricketer

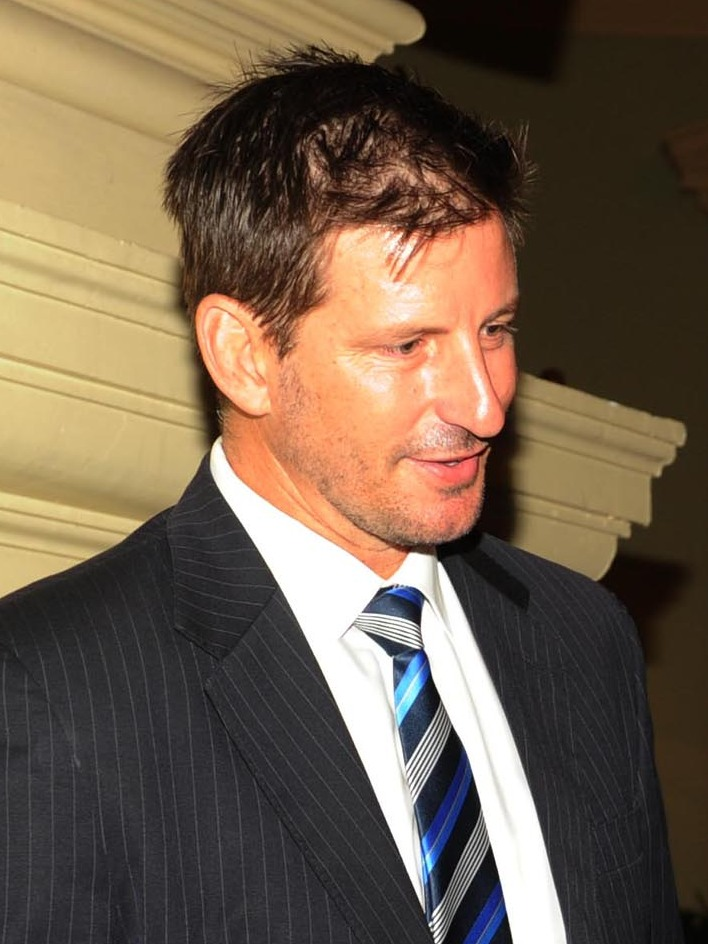

Personal information
- Full name: Michael Scott Kasprowicz
- Born: 10 February 1972 (age 54); Brisbane, Queensland, Australia
- Nickname: Kasper
- Height: 194 cm (6 ft 4 in)
- Batting: Right-handed
- Bowling: Right-arm fast
- Role: Bowler

International information
- National side: Australia (1995–2006)
- Test debut (cap 369): 22 November 1996 v West Indies
- Last Test: 4 April 2006 v South Africa
- ODI debut (cap 125): 19 December 1995 v West Indies
- Last ODI: 12 July 2005 v England
- T20I debut (cap 5): 17 February 2005 v New Zealand
- Last T20I: 13 June 2005 v England

Domestic team information
- Years: Team
- 1989/90–2007/08: Queensland
- 1994: Essex
- 1999: Leicestershire
- 2002–2004: Glamorgan

Career statistics
| Competition | Test | ODI | FC | LA |
|---|---|---|---|---|
| Matches | 38 | 43 | 237 | 220 |
| Runs scored | 445 | 74 | 4,342 | 955 |
| Batting average | 10.59 | 18.50 | 17.72 | 14.46 |
| 100s/50s | 0/0 | 0/0 | 0/11 | 0/0 |
| Top score | 25 | 28* | 92 | 40 |
| Balls bowled | 7,140 | 2,225 | 48,552 | 10,790 |
| Wickets | 113 | 67 | 944 | 293 |
| Bowling average | 32.88 | 24.98 | 26.52 | 26.51 |
| 5 wickets in innings | 4 | 2 | 51 | 3 |
| 10 wickets in match | 0 | 0 | 6 | 0 |
| Best bowling | 7/36 | 5/45 | 9/36 | 5/45 |
| Catches/stumpings | 16/– | 13/– | 95/– | 47/– |
Medal record
Representing Australia
Men's Cricket
Commonwealth Games
| Silver medal – second place | 1998 Kuala Lumpur | List-A cricket |
- Source: ESPNcricinfo, 13 September 2017

Michael Scott Kasprowicz (born 10 February 1972) is a former Australian international cricketer, who played all formats of the game. He is a right arm fast bowler. He represented Queensland and played in the English county scene at first class level.

== Personal life ==
A past student of Brisbane State High School, Kasprowicz is the older brother of former professional rugby union player Simon Kasprowicz. He holds a Masters of Business Administration from the University of Queensland. Kasprowicz is also a father to three children. His father is from Poland.

== Domestic career ==
Kasprowicz made his debut for Queensland as a seventeen-year-old in the 1989/90 domestic season. He was an AIS Australian Cricket Academy scholarship holder in 1990/91.

In 1991, Kasprowicz played for the Australian Under-19 team which was captained by Damien Martyn. In the 1991/92 season, Kasprowicz became the youngest Australian to take 50 first-class wickets.

Kasprowicz represented Mumbai Champs in the Indian Cricket League. Kasprowicz's name was not added to the list of national contract awardees announced by the ACB on 1 May 2007.

== International career ==
His solid performances for Queensland earned him a Test debut against West Indies in his native Brisbane in November 1996. However, he would go through his first two Test matches for Australia wicketless.

Kasprowicz played in all the Tests on the tours of Sri Lanka and India in 2004, which were won 3–0 and 2–1. After being in and out of the team since his debut, Kasprowicz returned in 2004 to hold down a regular spot ahead of Brett Lee.

In the 2005 Ashes, Kasprowicz almost pulled off an escape for the Australian team in the second test at Edgbaston. On the final day England needed one last wicket with Kasprowicz and Brett Lee at the crease. However the two batsmen had edged Australia to within two runs of England. But then Kasprowicz gloved a Steve Harmison ball to Geraint Jones and England won. Though TV replays showed the dismissal should not have been given as Kasprowicz took his lower hand off the bat before ball hit glove. After the 2005 Ashes loss to England, Kasprowicz was dropped from the Australian team and his Cricket Australia contract was not extended. However, he had a successful 2005/06 domestic season with Queensland, taking 44 wickets. This effort earned him a tenth recall to the national team to replace Glenn McGrath as Brett Lee's new ball partner.

On 8 February 2008 he announced his retirement from all forms of cricket effective 16 February. Kasprowicz's best Test batting score of 25 was made against India, Kolkata, 1997–1998. His best Test bowling figures of 7 for 36 came against England, The Oval, 1997. Kasprowicz's best ODI Batting score of 28 not out was made against England, Lord's, 1997. His best ODI bowling figures of 5 for 45 came against Sri Lanka, Colombo, 2003–2004.

== Post-retirement ==
Kasprowicz has been a director at Cricket Australia since 2011, although he briefly resigned from that position in 2016 to serve as interim CEO of Queensland Cricket.
