= Simon Kasprowicz =

Australian rugby union player

- Full name: Simon Kasprowicz
- Born: Brisbane, Queensland, Australia
- School: Brisbane State High School
- Notable relative: Michael Kasprowicz

Rugby union career
- Position: Flanker
Senior career
Years	Team	Apps	(Points)
2002–04	Waratahs	21	(10)
2005-08	Mitsubishi Sagamihara DynaBoars		

Simon Kasprowicz is a former Australian professional rugby union player who has played for the New South Wales Waratahs and Mitsubishi Sagamihara DynaBoars in Japan. He primarily played at flanker.

== Early life ==
Kasprowicz attended Brisbane State High School.

== Career in Australia ==
Kasprowicz played 21 matches for the New South Wales Waratahs from 2002 to 2004, scoring two tries.

== Career in Japan ==
Kasprowicz played in Japan between 2005 and 2008 for the Mitsubishi Sagamihara DynaBoars.

== Post playing ==
Kasprowicz now works as a director for portfolio sales for CBRE Group in Sydney.

== Personal life ==
Kasprowicz is the younger brother of former Australian cricketer Michael Kasprowicz. Their father is from Poland.
