= Blair Urlich =

- Full name: Blair Wolfgang Urlich
- Born: 26 January 1975 (age 51) Kaitaia, New Zealand

Rugby union career
- Position: Loose forward
Provincial / State sides
| Years | Team | Apps | (Points) |
| 1998–02 | North Harbour | 50 | (65) |
| 2008 | Northland | 10 | (5) |
Super Rugby
| Years | Team | Apps | (Points) |
| 2000–02 | Blues | 10 | (10) |
International career
| Years | Team | Apps | (Points) |
| 2002 | New Zealand Māori | 3 | (5) |

Blair Wolfgang Urlich (born 26 January 1975) is a New Zealand former professional rugby union player.

== Rugby career ==
A loose forward from Kaitaia, Urlich played for Northland under-19s and got his start in first-class rugby in 1998 with North Harbour, going on to make 50 provincial appearances. He featured once for the Blues in each of the 2000 and 2001 Super 12 seasons, then found more regular selection during their 2002 campaign, playing eight games. After being overlooked by the Blues in 2003, Urlich continued his career in Japan, playing for the Mitsubishi DynaBoars. He had a season with Northland in 2008 and the following year was appointed coach of Takapuna.

=== Representative ===
Urlich represented Croatia in rugby sevens and toured Australia in 2002 with New Zealand Māori.
