= Daiki Yamagiwa =

Japanese rugby union player

- Full name: Daiki Yamagiwa
- Born: 24 July 1997 (age 29) Japan
- Height: 1.98 m (6 ft 6 in)
- Weight: 120 kg (18 st 13 lb; 260 lb)

Rugby union career
- Position: Lock
- Current team: Mitsubishi Dynaboars
Senior career
| Years | Team | Apps | (Points) |
| 2020–2025 | NEC Green Rockets | 61 | (5) |
| 2025– | Mitsubishi Dynaboars | | |

Daiki Yamagiwa (山極 大貴, Yamagiwa Daiki; born 24 July 1998) is a Japanese rugby union player who plays as a Lock. He currently plays for Green Rockets Tokatsu in Japan's domestic Top League. He was a candidate for the U20 Japan National Team, but he was not selected.
