= Cheslin Kolbe =

South African Rugby Union player

- Kolbe in 2026
- Born: 28 October 1993 (age 33) Kraaifontein, Cape Province, South Africa
- Height: 1.71 m (5 ft 7 1/2 in)
- Weight: 75 kg (165 lb; 11 st 11 lb)
- School: Hoërskool Brackenfell
- University: University of the Free State
- Notable relative: Wayde van Niekerk (cousin)

Rugby union career
- Position(s): Wing, Fullback, Fly-half
- Current team: Stormers
Youth career
- 2009–2012: Western Province
Senior career
Years	Team	Apps	(Points)
2012–2017	Western Province	43	(65)
2013–2017	Stormers	49	(74)
2017–2021	Toulouse	82	(172)
2021–2023	Toulon	30	(50)
2023–2026	Tokyo Sungoliath	43	(321)
2026–	Stormers	0	(0)
- Correct as of 8 June 2026
International career
Years	Team	Apps	(Points)
2013	South Africa U20	5	(10)
2015–2016	South Africa Sevens	30	(113)
2018–	South Africa	53	(170)
- Correct as of 5 September 2026
Medal record
Representing South Africa
Men's rugby sevens
Olympic Games
Bronze medal – third place	2016 Rio de Janeiro	Team competition
Men's rugby union
Rugby World Cup
Gold medal – first place	2019 Japan	Squad
Gold medal – first place	2023 France	Squad

Cheslin Kolbe (born 28 October 1993) is a South African professional rugby union player who plays primarily as a wing for the Stormers and the South Africa national team. Renowned for his speed, agility, and footwork, he rose from Kraaifontein, Cape Town, to become one of rugby's most influential backs. After representing Western Province and the Stormers, Kolbe starred for the South African sevens team, winning bronze at the 2016 Summer Olympics in Rio de Janeiro, before making his Springboks debut in 2018. He has since played a key role in South Africa's Rugby World Cup (RWC) triumphs in 2019 and 2023, including scoring a famous try in the 2019 final.

At club level, Kolbe won the Currie Cup with Western Province, the Top 14 and European Rugby Champions Cup with Toulouse, and later played for Toulon before joining Tokyo Sungoliath in 2023. Off the field, he supports disadvantaged youth through the Be The Difference Foundation and his own Cheslin Kolbe Foundation.

== Early life ==
Kolbe played for Hoërskool Brackenfell. He represented Western Province at various youth levels, from the Under-16 Grant Khomo Week in 2009 to the 2012 Under-21 Provincial Championship.

== Club career ==
=== Western Province ===
He made his provincial first class debut in their Vodacom Cup match against Boland Cavaliers. and a month later he was named on the bench for the Stormers for their Super Rugby game against the Sharks.

In October 2014, he was part of the Western Province team that won the Currie Cup by beating the Lions 19–16.

He penned a three-year deal to remain at Western Province until 2016.

=== Toulouse ===
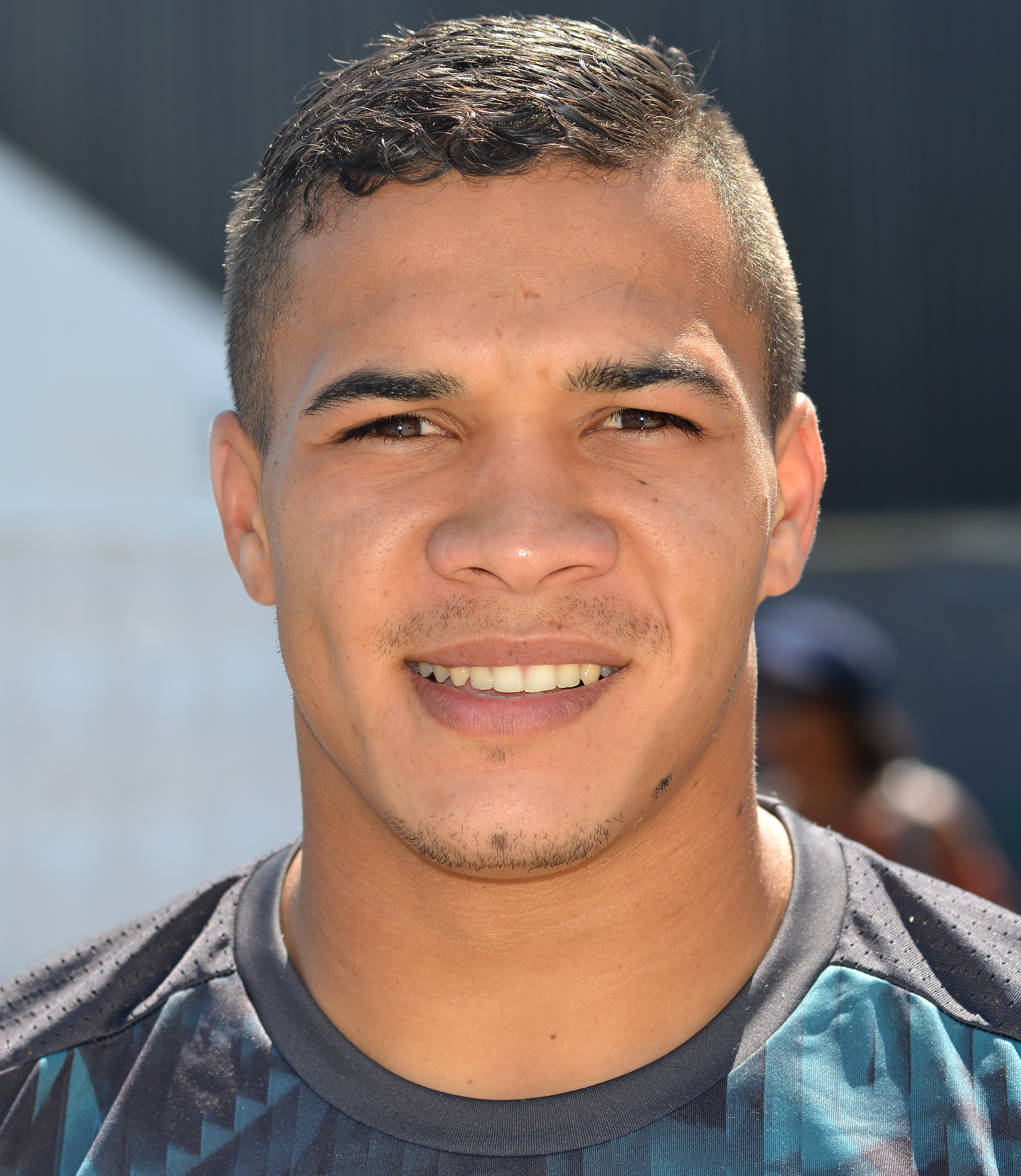
Kolbe with Toulouse in 2017

Kolbe moved to France to join Top 14 side Toulouse for the 2017–2018 season. Kolbe received a call-up to the South Africa national team for the 2018 Rugby Championship. He made his debut for South Africa against Australia on 8 September, during Round Three of the competition, coming on in the 33rd minute as an injury replacement for Makazole Mapimpi, in a match that South Africa lost 18–23.

In June 2019, Kolbe started for Stade Toulousain in the Top 14 final winning the French Championship. In 2021 Kolbe won both the European Cup and the Top 14 with Toulouse.

=== Tokyo Sungoliath ===
In June 2023, Kolbe signed for the Tokyo Sungoliath in the first division of the Japan Rugby League One (JRLO), ahead of the 2023–24 season. Kolbe's contract with Toulon was up at the conclusion of the 2022–23 Top 14 season. Although it was reported that the Cape Town-based Stormers had offered Kolbe R11 and R15 million rand deals (for which Kolbe is said to have turned down), Western Province Rugby said it made no formal offer. Kolbe was one of three, alongside former New Zealand captain Sam Cane and Welsh fly-half Gareth Anscombe, high-profile international players in the Sungoliath squad for the 2023–24 season.

Kolbe started in all but one of his 43 games for the team across three seasons (2023–24, 2024–25, 2025–26). Although Kolbe never won a title with the team, he was consistently one of the highest scoring players in the competition, finishing with over 20 tries, and over 200 points in his last season; the top scorer.

Throughout 2024, 2025, and 2026, Kolbe was reported to be one of the highest-paid rugby union players in the world, the highest paid player in Japan, and the highest-paid South African international.

=== Stormers ===
In May 2026, it was confirmed that Kolbe would be returning to the Stormers in the United Rugby Championship (URC) ahead of their 2026–27 season. This marked his first appearance in South African domestic rugby for nearly ten years. Kolbe had been linked with the Stormers, his home team, since his time in the French Top 14. An Afrikaans news source reported in the same month that the Stormers were in talks with other South African international players like Damian de Allende and Eben Etzebeth.

== International career ==
Kolbe made his test debut in 2018 and played an important part in Springboks winning the 2019 Rugby Championship. On 2 November, Kolbe was part of the 2019 World Cup winning team in Japan, scoring a try late in the second half of the final against England. Kolbe was again instrumental in the 2021 British & Irish Lions tour to South Africa, starting in all three test matches and the South Africa A match. Kolbe scored the Springboks' only try in the third and deciding test of the tour to propel South Africa to a series win. He was also instrumental to victory in the 2023 World Cup, where he received a yellow card and was sent off for a deliberate knock-on in the last ten minutes of the World Cup final, as South Africa held on to win 12–11 against New Zealand.

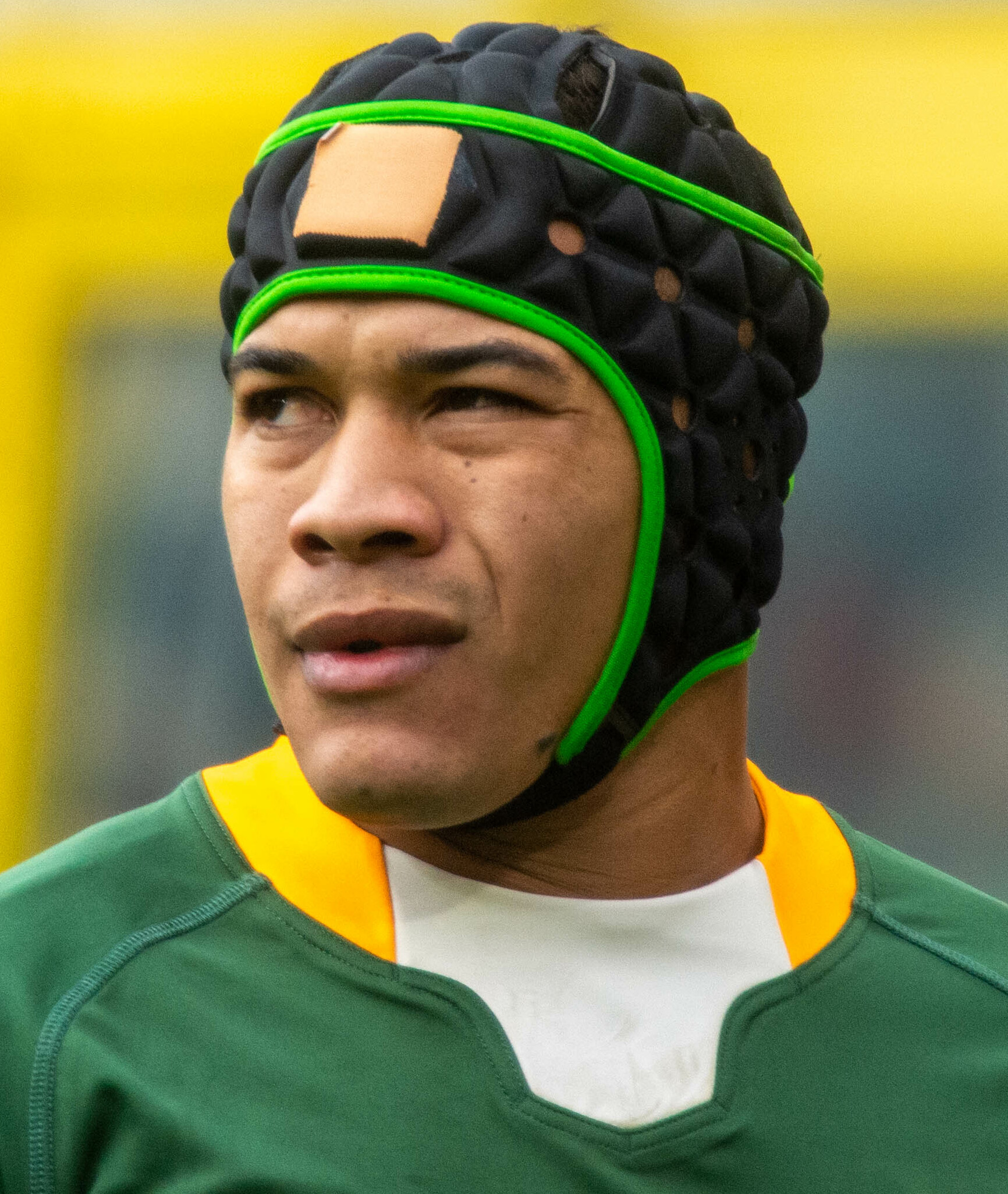
Kolbe playing for South Africa in 2022

Kolbe at the launch of his autobiography

Kolbe's autobiography book launch

=== South Africa Under-20 ===
In 2013, he was included in the training group that toured Argentina in preparation for the 2013 IRB Junior World Championship. He was then included in the squad for the 2013 IRB Junior World Championship.

=== National sevens team ===
Between 2012 and 2017, he represented the South Africa Sevens team. In 2013, he was included in the squad for the 2013 Rugby World Cup Sevens. Kolbe was included in a 12-man squad for the 2016 Summer Olympics in Rio de Janeiro. He was named as a substitute for their first match in Group B of the competition against Spain, with South Africa winning the match 24–0.

== Honours ==
Western Province

- 2014 Currie Cup winner

Toulouse

- Heineken Cup European Champions/European Rugby Champions Cup: 2021
- Top 14 French League : 2019, 2021

Toulon

- European Challenge Cup: 2022–23

South Africa

- 2019 Rugby Championship winner
- 2019 Rugby World Cup winner
- 2019 World Rugby Men's 15s Player of the Year nominee
- 2021 British & Irish Lions tour to South Africa winner
- 2023 Qatar Airways Cup vs New Zealand at Twickenham winner
- 2023 Rugby World Cup winner
- 2024 Rugby Championship winner
- 2025 Rugby Championship winner
- SA Rugby Awards
  - SA Rugby Men's Player of the Year: 2024

South Africa 7's

- 2016 Olympics Bronze medal

=== Test Match record ===
As of 5 September 2026

Against	P	W	D	L	Tri	Pts	%Won
Argentina	6	6	0	0	3	15	100
Australia	5	4	0	1	0	0	80
British & Irish Lions	3	2	0	1	1	5	66.67
England	4	4	0	0	4	30	100
France	4	3	0	1	1	13	75
Italy	3	3	0	0	3	23	100
Ireland	5	2	0	3	2	13	40
Japan	3	3	0	0	2	10	100
New Zealand	13	7	1	5	5	56	53.85
Scotland	2	2	0	0	0	0	100
Wales	5	4	0	1	1	5	80
Total	53	40	1	12	22	170	75.47

Pld = Games Played, W = Games Won, D = Games Drawn, L = Games Lost, Tri = Tries Scored, Pts = Points Scored

=== Test tries (22) ===
Try	Opposition	Location	Venue	Competition	Date	Result	Score
1	New Zealand	Wellington, New Zealand	Westpac Stadium	2018 Rugby Championship	15 September 2018	Win	34–36
2	New Zealand	Pretoria, South Africa	Loftus Versfeld	2018 Rugby Championship	6 October 2018	Loss	30–32
3	Argentina	Salta, Argentina	Estadio Padre Ernesto Martearena	2019 Rugby Championship	10 August 2019	Win	13–46
4	Japan	Kumagaya, Japan	Kumagaya Rugby Stadium	Test match	6 September 2019	Win	7–41
5	Japan	Kumagaya, Japan	Kumagaya Rugby Stadium	Test match	6 September 2019	Win	7–41
6	Italy	Fukuroi, Japan	Shizuoka Stadium	2019 Rugby World Cup	4 October 2019	Win	3–49
7	Italy	Fukuroi, Japan	Shizuoka Stadium	2019 Rugby World Cup	4 October 2019	Win	3–49
8	England	Yokohama, Japan	International Stadium Yokohama	2019 Rugby World Cup Final	2 November 2019	Win	12–32
9	British & Irish Lions	Cape Town, South Africa	Cape Town Stadium	2021 British & Irish Lions tour	7 August 2021	Win	19–16
10	Wales	Pretoria, South Africa	Loftus Versfeld Stadium	2022 Wales tour	2 July 2022	Win	32–29
11	Italy	Genoa, Italy	Luigi Ferraris Stadium	2022 end-of-year rugby union internationals	19 November 2022	Win	21–63
12	New Zealand	Auckland, New Zealand	Mount Smart Stadium	2023 Rugby Championship	15 July 2023	Loss	35–20
13	Ireland	Saint-Denis, France	Stade de France	2023 Rugby World Cup	23 September 2023	Loss	8–13
14	France	Saint-Denis, France	Stade de France	2023 Rugby World Cup	15 October 2023	Win	28–29
15	Ireland	Pretoria, South Africa	Loftus Versfeld Stadium	2024 Ireland tour of South Africa	6 July 2024	Win	27–20
16	Argentina	Mbombela, South Africa	Mbombela Stadium	2024 Rugby Championship	28 September 2024	Win	48–7
17	England	London, England	Twickenham Stadium	2024 end-of-year rugby union internationals	16 November 2024	Win	20–29
18	England	London, England	Twickenham Stadium	2024 end-of-year rugby union internationals	16 November 2024	Win	20–29
19	New Zealand	Wellington, New Zealand	Wellington Regional Stadium	2025 Rugby Championship	13 September 2025	Win	10–43
20	New Zealand	Wellington, New Zealand	Wellington Regional Stadium	2025 Rugby Championship	13 September 2025	Win	10–43
21	Argentina	Durban, South Africa	Kings Park Stadium	2025 Rugby Championship	27 September 2025	Win	67–30
22	England	Johannesburg, South Africa	Ellis Park Stadium	2026 Nations Championship	4 July 2026	Win	45–21

== Personal life ==
Kolbe married Layla Cupido in 2018 and they have three children together.

He is a devout Christian.

Kolbe is a cousin of famous South African track and field sprinter Wayde van Niekerk, who won the gold medal in the 400 metres at the 2016 Olympics and is the current 400m world record holder.
