= Josh Syms =

- Full name: Joshua Douglas Syms
- Born: 2 July 1980 (age 46) New Zealand
- Height: 182 cm (6 ft 0 in)
- Weight: 91 kg (201 lb; 14 st 5 lb)
- School: Palmerston North Boys' High School
- University: Massey University

Rugby union career
Youth career
- Palmerston North High School Old Boys
Senior career
| Years | Team | Apps | (Points) |
| 2002 | Manawatu | 1 | (5) |
Coaching career
- Years: Team
- 2013: Southland (Advisor)
- 2015–2016: Wairarapa Bush
- 2017: Hawke's Bay (Advisor)
- 2018–2021: Hawke's Bay (Assistant coach)
- 2022: Hawke's Bay
- 2023: Old Glory DC
- 2023–2024: Zebre Parma (Forwards coach)
- 2024–2026: Toshiba Brave Lupus (Forwards coach)
- 2026–: Toshiba Brave Lupus
- Correct as of 14 August 2026

Joshua Douglas Syms (born 2 July 1980) is a New Zealand rugby union coach and former player. He is currently the head coach of Toshiba Brave Lupus in the Japan Rugby League One.

== Early life and education ==
Syms was grew up in the Manawatū-Whanganui region and was educated at Palmerston North Boys' High School. He went on to study at Massey University, graduating with a Bachelor of Arts degree in May 2002.

== Playing career ==
In 2002, Syms played as a forward for Manawatu in the National Provincial Championship (NPC). He played one senior game, scoring a try as a substitute. Syms also played cricket, representing Bay of Plenty at youth level.

In 2005, Syms retired from playing rugby and took up coaching.

== Coaching career ==
=== Early coaching ===
Throughout the late 2000s, Syms coached across New Zealand's youth and semi-professional level, recording titles with Wellington's Hutt Old Boys-Marist and Auckland's Saint Kentigern College. He also coached the New Zealand Barbarian Secondary Schools, and the Thailand Sevens team.

=== Provincial coaching ===
In 2013, Syms became a technical analyst for the Southland Stags in the National Provincial Championship. By 2015, Syms had become the head coach of Wairarapa Bush in the Heartland Championship. He took Wairarapa Bush to the Meads Cup play-offs twice in two seasons, although did not progress to the final. He held a win ratio of 57.1% while at the club.

Throughout 2017, Syms had been a technical advisor for the Hawke's Bay Magpies in the National Provincial Championship. The following year, he had been appointed the teams forwards coach on a two-year deal. In 2020, while assistant coach, Hawke's Bay successfully challenged the Ranfurly Shield after defeating Otago 9–28 in Dunedin. It was the first time in 4 years, 361 days that they had held New Zealand's most prestigious trophy. After several years with the club, Syms had been appointed the head coach in late 2021, ahead of the 2022 season. Syms took the team to the play-offs where they were knocked out in the quarter-finals.

While at Hawke's Bay, Syms took up the head coaching role with Old Glory DC in the Major League Rugby. In his inaugural season, Syms took the team to the play-offs, their maiden post-season appearance. They were knocked out in the conference final. In May 2023, just 12 weeks from the start of the 2023 NPC season, Syms resigned as coach of Hawke's Bay to take up a position as forwards coach of Zebre Parma in the United Rugby Championship.

=== Japan ===
In August 2024, Syms was announced as the new forwards coach of Toshiba Brave Lupus in the Japan Rugby League One ahead of their 2024–25 season. At the time of his appointment, Toshiba had been under the tutelage of successful former Crusaders coach Todd Blackadder and were the defending champions. Toshiba won the 2024–25 season, defeating Kubota Spears 18–13 in the final.

In July 2026, after three years with Toshiba, Syms was appointed head coach. Former head coach Todd Blackadder, whom had been the longest-serving coach in the competition at the time of his standing down, moved into a High-Performance Director and Advisor role with the club.
