= Kanzo Schinckel =

Japanese rugby union player

- Born: August 20, 1999 (age 27) Hokkaido, Japan
- Height: 1.87 m (6 ft 2 in)
- Weight: 125 kg (19 st 10 lb; 276 lb)
- School: Sapporo Yamatedaka
- University: Ryutsu Keizai University

Rugby union career
- Position: Prop
Senior career
Years	Team	Apps	(Points)
2023–	Mitsubishi DynaBoars	20	(5)
- Correct as of 25 February 2025

Kanzo Schinckel (Japanese: シンクル 寛造; born August 20, 1999) is a Japanese rugby union player who currently plays as a Prop for the Mitsubishi DynaBoars in Japan's League One.
