= Lee Seung-sin =

Japan international rugby union player

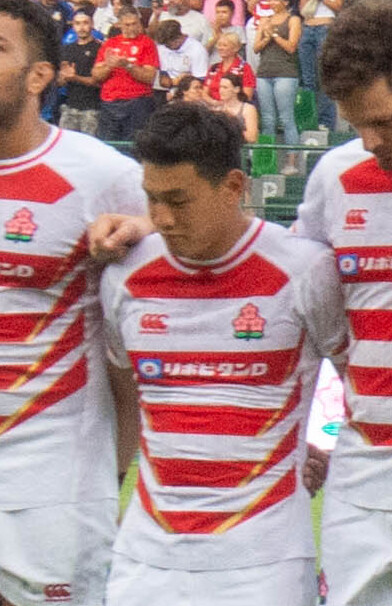
- Seung-sin with Japan in 2023
- Full name: Lee Seung-sin
- Born: 13 January 2001 (age 25) Kobe, Hyōgo, Japan
- Height: 1.76 m (5 ft 9 in)
- Weight: 86 kg (190 lb; 13 st 8 lb)
- School: Osaka Korean High School
- University: Teikyo University

Rugby union career
- Position(s): Fly-half, Centre, Fullback
- Current team: Kobelco Steelers
Youth career
- 2014–2015: Hyōgo School Select
- 2015: Hyōgo Prefecture Rugby School
- 2016–2019: Ōsaka Korean High School
Senior career
Years	Team	Apps	(Points)
2020–	Kobelco Steelers	83	(430)
- Correct as of 21 June 2024
International career
Years	Team	Apps	(Points)
2020–2023	Junior Japan	4	(17)
2022–	Japan	29	(125)
- Correct as of 25 August 2024

Korean name
- Hangul: 이승신
- RR: I Seungsin
- MR: I Sŭngsin
- IPA: [i sɯŋɕin]

Lee Seung-sin (Note: Korean: 이승신; Japanese: 李承信, romanized: Ri Shōshin) (born 13 January 2001) is a Japanese professional rugby union player of Korean descent who plays as a fly-half for Japan Rugby League One club Kobelco Kobe Steelers and the Japan national team.

== Early life and career ==
Lee was born in Kobe, on the Japanese main island–region of Kansai in the Hyōgo Prefecture. All throughout his early career he played for schools and selection teams in the Kansai region, also known as Kinki. Lee attended the Hyōgo Prefecture Rugby School, the Ōsaka Korean High School and later Teikyo University in his youth.

At only 19-years-old Lee joined Japan Rugby League One side Kobelco Kobe Steelers. He made five appearances in his debut season. In the 2022/23 season he had an increased role, scoring over 100 points.

== International career ==
Lee captained Japan High Schools in a tour of Wales in 2019. Scoring in a 32–29 loss against Wales U19s. He captained Japan U20.

In 2020 Lee was named captain of the Junior Japan squad for the World Rugby Pacific Challenge, he led his side to win the competition.

He made his debut in 2022, coming off the bench in a 43–7 win over Uruguay. In 2023 he was named in Jamie Joseph's squad for the 2023 Rugby World Cup.

== Personal life ==
Lee is of Korean descent, being a notable Korean in Japan. In 2023, he stated that he wanted to blaze a trail for his country's ethnic Korean population by playing at the 2023 Rugby World Cup.
