= Osaka Korean High School =

North Korea-affiliated school in Japan

Coordinates: 34.6761°N 135.6162°E

Osaka Korean Junior and Senior High School
- 大阪朝鮮中高級学校 오사까조선중고급학교

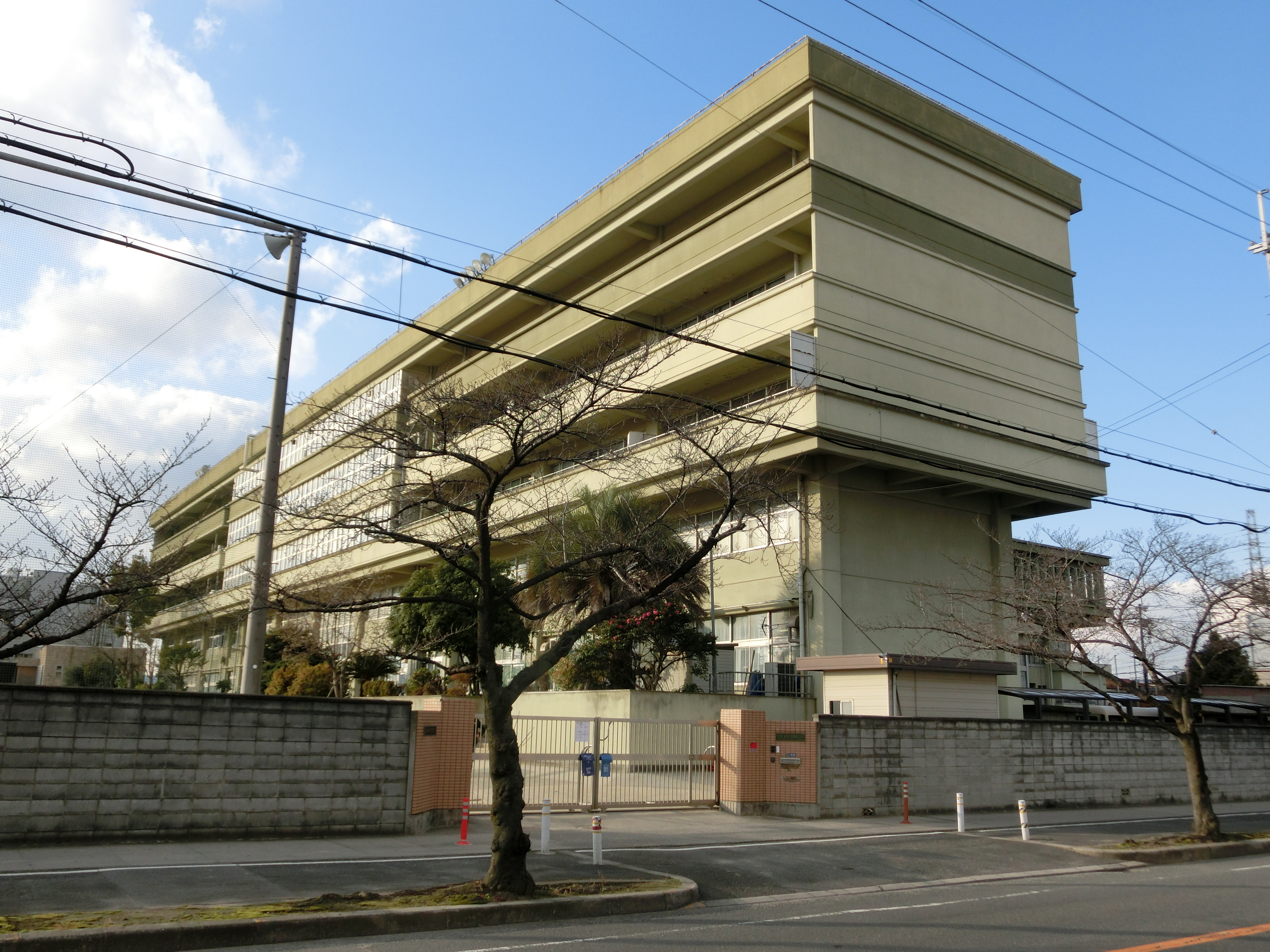
- The former Higashiosaka campus in 2015

Location
- 3-17-6 Higashinakamoto, Higashinari-ku; Osaka, Osaka Prefecture, 537-0021; Japan

Information
- Type: Private Korean international school
- Established: 1952; 74 years ago
- School board: Osaka Korean Educational Foundation
- Principal: 金采玹
- Grades: Junior and senior high school
- Website: osakaks.ed.jp

Osaka Korean High School (Japanese: 大阪朝鮮高級学校, Hepburn: Osaka Chōsen Kōkyū Gakkō; Korean: 오사까조선고급학교) is senior high school in Higashiōsaka, Japan. It is a Chōsen gakkō: a North Korea-aligned school for Koreans in Japan. The government of Osaka Prefecture classifies the school as a "miscellaneous school".

In July 2017, Judge Takahiro Nishida of the Osaka District Court ordered the government to include the School in its tuition waver program, determining that previous exclusions of the School were unlawful.

== Notable alumni ==
=== Footballers ===
- Park Seung-ri
- Ryang Yong-gi
- Ri Yong-jik

=== Boxers ===
- Lee Ryol-li
- Teiru Kinoshita

== See also ==
- Ikuno Korea Town – a Korean community in Osaka
