= Kazuma Ueda =

Japanese rugby sevens player

- Born: 4 December 2002 (age 23)
- Height: 176 cm (5 ft 9 in)
- Weight: 78 kg (172 lb; 12 st 4 lb)

Rugby union career
- Position(s): Wing, Fullback
- Current team: Kobelco Steelers
Senior career
| Years | Team | Apps | (Points) |
| 2025– | Kobelco Steelers | 25 | (55) |
International career
| Years | Team | Apps | (Points) |
| 2025- | Japan | 12 | (5) |
National sevens team
| Years | Team | | Comps |
| 2022–Present | Japan | | 6 |

Kazuma Ueda (born 4 December 2002) is a Japanese rugby sevens player. He competed for Japan at the 2024 Summer Olympics in Paris.
