= Merwe Olivier =

South African rugby union player

- Born: 9 October 2002 (age 24) South Africa
- Height: 194 cm (6 ft 4 in)
- Weight: 108 kg (238 lb; 17 st 0 lb)
- School: Grey College

Rugby union career
- Position(s): Lock, Flanker
- Current team: Kubota Spears
Senior career
Years	Team	Apps	(Points)
2023–2024	Blue Bulls	2	(0)
2023–2024	Bulls		
2024–	Kubota Spears	33	(30)
- Correct as of 29 October 2023
International career
Years	Team	Apps	(Points)
2022	South Africa U20	3	(0)
- Correct as of 29 October 2023

Merwe Olivier (born 9 October 2002) is a South African rugby union player, who plays for the Bulls in the United Rugby Championship and the Blue Bulls in the Currie Cup. His preferred position is lock.

== Early career ==
Olivier attended Grey College in Bloemfontein. He came through the Bulls youth systems, representing the side in the U21 competition in 2023. In 2022, his performances earned him selection for South Africa U20 for the Summer Series.

== Professional career ==
Olivier made his professional debut in 2023, debuting for the Blue Bulls in the 2023 Currie Cup Premier Division. He made two appearances in the competition, debuting against the Golden Lions. Previously, he had been named in the Bulls squad for their European tour in March 2023. He was then named in the full Bulls squad ahead of the 2023–24 United Rugby Championship.
