= Kengo Kitagawa =

Japan international rugby union player

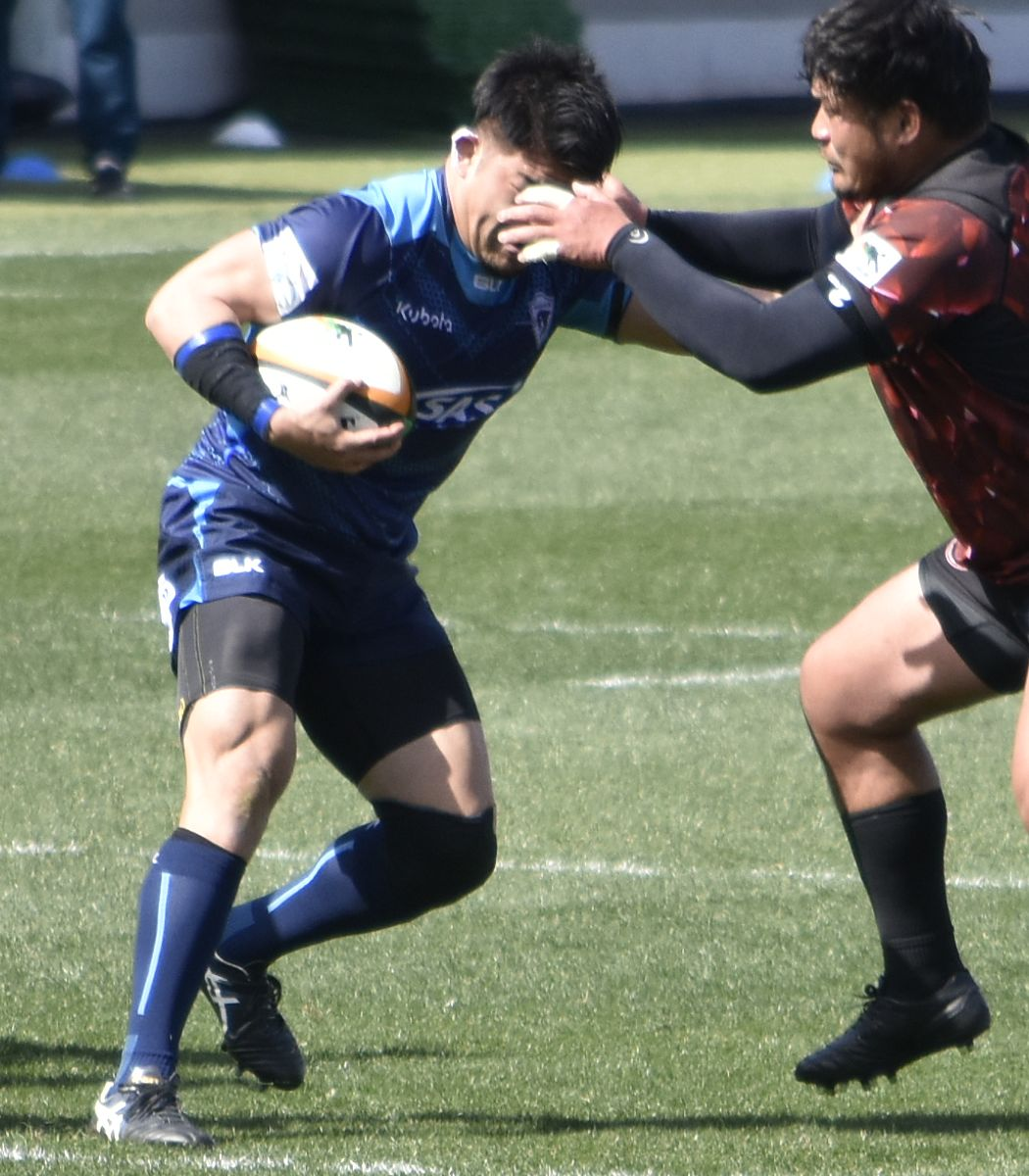
- Full name: Kengo Kitagawa
- Born: 27 August 1992 (age 34) Japan
- Height: 1.78 m (5 ft 10 in)
- Weight: 115 kg (18 st 2 lb; 254 lb)

Rugby union career
- Position: Prop
- Current team: Kubota Spears
Senior career
Years	Team	Apps	(Points)
2015–present	Kubota Spears	98	(0)
- Correct as of 23 April 2021
International career
Years	Team	Apps	(Points)
2011–2012	Japan U20	8	(5)
2016–present	Japan	3	(0)
- Correct as of 23 April 2021

Kengo Kitagawa (北川 賢吾, Kitagawa Kengo; born 27 Aug 1992) is a Japanese rugby union player who plays as a Prop. He currently plays for Kubota Spears in Japan's domestic Top League.

== International ==
Japan head coach Jamie Joseph has named Kengo Kitagawa in a 52-man training squad ahead of British and Irish Lions test.
