= Rugby Republic =

Japanese rugby union news website

- Native name: ラグビーリパブリック
- Romanized name: Ragubī kyōwakoku
- Website type: Sports news
- Available in: Japanese
- Founded: 2011; 15 years ago
- Headquarters: Nihonbashi Hamacho, Chūō, Tokyo 103-8482
- Area served: Japan
- Owner: Baseball Magazine Company
- Industry: News; Sports journalism
- Website: rugby-rp.com
- Current status: Active

Rugby Republic (Japanese: ラグビーリパブリック, romanized: Ragubī kyōwakoku), also known as the Republic of Rugby, is a Japanese sports news website that predominantly provides coverage of rugby union in Japan. The website is owned by Baseball Magazine Company, and operated by Rugby Magazine.

Launching in 2011, the website covered the 2011 Rugby World Cup in New Zealand, ahead of Japan's hosting of the 2019 Rugby World Cup, which was confirmed in 2009. In 2021, Rugby Republic began actively producing content for its YouTube channel in 2021. Originally established in 2013, the platform became a regular venue for the websites news and information.
