= Frans Ludeke =

- Born: Frans Ludeke; 24 April 1968 (age 58) Polokwane, South Africa
- Occupation: Rugby Coach

Rugby union career
- Position: Head Coach
- Current team: Kubota Spears Funabashi Tokyo Bay
Senior career
Years	Team	Apps	(Points)
1991	Transvaal	15	(0)
Coaching career
- Years: Team
- 1999–2000: SWD Eagles
- 2000: South Africa (Asst.)
- 2002: Cats
- 2001–2006: Golden Lions
- 2006: Cats
- 2008–2015: Blue Bulls
- 2008–2015: Bulls
- 2015: Fiji
- 2016–present: Kubota Spears

Frans Ludeke (born 24 April 1968) is a South African rugby union coach, currently the head coach of Japanese Top League side Kubota Spears. having previously coached the Bulls and the Cats in Super Rugby. Ludeke, who coached the Bulls between 2008 and 2015, coached the side to two Super Rugby titles, in 2009 and 2010. He additionally coached the Blue Bulls and the Golden Lions in the South African Currie Cup competition.

Ludeke is the most experienced coach in Super Rugby, having coached 149 matches, 125 for the Bulls and 24 for the Cats, in his 9-year career in the competition.

Ludeke has over 30 years of experience in coaching, having started in 1987 coaching Hoërskool Vorentoe before a brief stint coaching English clubs. In 1997 he coached the RAU Under-21 team as well as the Transvaal Under-19s with Jake White. In 1998 he was appointed coach of the RAU first team and in 1999 he became head coach of SWD Eagles. In 2000 he became assistant coach to Heyneke Meyer with the Bulls for the 2000 Super 12 season, and joined Harry Viljoen for the Springboks tour to Argentina and Europe. In 2001 he was named South Africa Under-19 coach, before being named Golden Lions head coach. He became the Cats head coach in 2001 ahead of the 2002 Super 12 season, but was sacked following a very poor season, seeing the Cats finish second to last with just 1 win. He returned to the Cats in 2006, but in a repeat of 2003, Ludeke was sacked just 1 season into his contract. It also saw his Golden Lions contract terminated with immediate effect. In November 2007, Ludeke returned to the coaching fold, being named head coach of the Bulls for the 2008 Super 14 season. It saw Ludeke remain at the helm for 8 years, which included a re-sign of his contract in 2013. However, with 1 year still on his contract, Ludeke stepped down as Bulls head coach in 2015.

In July 2015, it was announced Ludeke would join the Fiji national team coaching set-up ahead of the 2015 Rugby World Cup, working with the forwards, lineouts, and kickoffs.

After his time with the Fiji national team, in 2016 Ludeke became the new head coach for the Kubota Spears Funabashi Tokyo Bay, a Japan Rugby League One team. He has continued his role as the head coach to the present day. In the 2022-2023 season, Ludeke lead the Kubota Spears to their first ever club championship victory in a 17-15 win against the Saitama Wild Nights.
