= Mitsubishi Sagamihara DynaBoars =

Japanese rugby union club, based in Sagamihara

Mitsubishi Sagamihara DynaBoars 三菱重工相模原ダイナボアーズ
- Full name: Mitsubishi Heavy Industries Ltd. Sagamihara Rugby Club
- Nickname: Dynaboars
- Founded: 1981
- Location: Sagamihara, Kanagawa, Japan
- Ground: Sagamihara Gion Stadium (Capacity: 15,300)
- Chairman: Shigeki Iwamatsu
- Coach: Glenn Delaney
- Captain: Kyo Yoshida
- League: Japan Rugby League One
- 2025–26: 12th of 12 (won relegation play-off)
Team kit	2nd kit

Official website
- www.mhi.com/jp/company/sports/dynaboars/

Mitsubishi Sagamihara Dynaboars (Japanese: 三菱重工相模原ダイナボアーズ), commonly shortened to Sagamihara Dynaboars and also known as Mitsubishi Juko Sagamihara Rugby Club, are a professional Japanese rugby union team based in Sagamihara, Kanagawa Prefecture that compete in the Japan Rugby League One (JRLO) competition. The club is owned by the Mitsubishi Heavy Industries.

The club was founded in 1981. It came second in the Top East 10 league in 2004–05 and entered the Top League challenge series play-off.

The club won the Top East 11 league in 2006–07 and entered the Top League in 2007–08. The team was named Dynaboars (a conflation of "dynamic" and "boars") as part of their promotion to the Top League; however, they were demoted at the end of the season. The Dynaboars signed ex-Wales international and IRB World Player of the Year 2008 Shane Williams in 2012, retiring in 2014.

== Players ==
=== Current squad ===
The Mitsubishi Sagamihara DynaBoars squad for the 2026–27 season is:

Mitsubishi Sagamihara DynaBoars squad
**Props**: (Japan) Mototsugu Hachiya; (South Korea) Ahn Chang-ho*; (South Korea) Chae Yū-ji*; (Japan) **Shunsuke Asaoka**; (Japan) Keita Ando; (Japan) Jun Morimoto; (Japan) Tomoaki Ishii; (Japan) Kanzo Schinckel; (South Africa) Pieter Scholtz; **Hookers**: (Japan) **Lee Seung-hyuk***; (Japan) Yūki Miyazato; (Japan) Shoma Sagawa; (Japan) Naoki Kotera; (Japan) Naoto Yasutsune; **Locks**: (Japan) Daiki Yamagiwa; (South Africa) Walt Steenkamp*; (England) Tim Cardall; (Japan) Shoichi Takagi; (Japan) Koki Matsumoto; (Australia) Luke Porter*; (Japan) **Epineri Uluiviti***	**Flankers**: (Japan) Kyo Yoshida (c); (South Africa) Friedle Olivier; (Japan) Bunsuke Kurita; (Japan) Masataka Tsuruya; (South Korea) Cho Song-yu*; (Japan) Koki Sato; (Japan) Yusuke Sakamoto; (Japan) Koki Hattori; **No8s**: (Japan) Jose Seru; (New Zealand) Marino Mikaele-Tu'u; **Scrum-halves**: (New Zealand) **Brad Weber**; (Japan) Kota Iwamura; (Japan) Yoshiki Yoshioka; (Japan) Dai Kawahara; (New Zealand) Jack Stratton*; **Fly-halves**: (Australia) Jack Bowen ^{LOAN}; (Japan) Shun Miyake; (Japan) Shinnosuke Yamashita	**Centres**: (Japan) **Charlie Lawrence***; (Japan) Shota Taira; (South Africa) **Lukhanyo Am**; (Japan) Riku Mishima; (Fiji) Joape Naco*; (Tonga) Haniteli Vailea*; (New Zealand) Matt Vaega*; **Wingers**: (Japan) **Junta Hamano**; (Japan) DJ Kashima; (New Zealand) Too Jr Vaega*; (South Africa) **Kurt-Lee Arendse**; **Fullbacks**: (Japan) **Semisi Masirewa***; (Japan) Satoshi Koizumi; (Japan) Shoki Yoshimoto; **Utility Backs**
(c) denotes team captain.; **Bold** denotes internationally capped.

=== Former players ===
- (Australia) Simon Kasprowicz - lock
- (New Zealand) Blair Urlich - No. 8
- (Japan) Kohei Matsui - center three-quarter back
- (New Zealand) Troy Flavell - lock
- (South Africa) Isma-eel Dollie - Flyhalf
- (Wales) Shane Williams – Wing
- (England) Dave Walder - Flyhalf
- (Samoa) David Milo - No. 8
- (New Zealand) Hamish Gard inside centre

== Coaches ==
=== Current coaching staff ===
Position	Name	Nationality
Head coach	Glenn Delaney	New Zealand
Assistant coach	Ben Franks	New Zealand
Assistant coach	Joe Maddock	New Zealand
Assistant coach	Yasumasa Miyamoto	Japan
Assistant coach	Nicholas Ealey	New Zealand
Assistant coach	Kensaku Akuta	Japan
