= Inoke Burua =

Fijian rugby union player

- Born: 30 May 1999 (age 27) Suva, Fiji
- Height: 1.78 m (5 ft 10 in)
- Weight: 100 kg (15 st 10 lb; 220 lb)
- School: Suva Grammar School
- University: Ryutsu Keizai University

Rugby union career
- Position: Wing
- Current team: Kobe Steelers
Senior career
Years	Team	Apps	(Points)
2020	Sunwolves	0	(0)
2022–2024	Canon Eagles	29	(105)
2024–	Kobe Steelers	30	(95)
- Correct as of 3 November 2025
International career
Years	Team	Apps	(Points)
2026	Japan XV	1	(5)
2026–	Japan	5	(0)
- Correct as of 11 August 2026

Inoke Burua (イノケ・ブルア, Inoke burua; born 30 May 1999) is a professional rugby union player who plays as a wing for Japan Rugby League One club Kobe Steelers.

== Early career ==
Burua was born in Suva, Fiji and attended Suva Grammar School where he captained the rugby team. After school, he moved to Japan to study at Ryutsu Keizai University where he also played rugby between 2018 and 2022. He is Japanese qualified due to residency.

== Career ==
While still a university student, Burua signed for the Japanese Super Rugby side the Sunwolves, being named as part of their squad for the 2020 Super Rugby season. He did not make an appearance for the side. After graduating he signed for the Yokohama Canon Eagles in 2022. In his first season for the club, he scored 14 tries, the third most in the competition. Ahead of the 2025 season, Burua joined the Kobelco Kobe Steelers.

== International career ==
In June 2026, Burua was called up for Japan. In the June International Window, Burua started on the left-wing for Japan XV against the Māori All Blacks at the Paloma Mizuho Stadium, Nagoya. Burua scored a try for the team in the 39th minute, however the team lost 31–38.
