= Kubota Spears =

Japanese rugby union club, based in Funabashi

Kubota Spears クボタスピアーズ船橋・東京ベイ
- Full name: Kubota Spears Funabashi Tokyo Bay
- Nickname: Kubota Spears
- Founded: 1978; 48 years ago
- Location: Funabashi, Chiba, Japan
- Region: Chiba Prefecture
- Ground: Edogawa Stadium (Capacity: 6,950)
- Director of Rugby: Wataru Kondo
- Coach: Frans Ludeke
- Captain: Faulua Makisi
- League: Japan Rugby League One
- 2025–26: 3rd of 12, runners-up
Home kit	Away kit	Third kit

Official website
- www.kubota-spears.com

Kubota Spears Funabashi Tokyo Bay (Japanese: クボタスピアーズ船橋・東京ベイ), commonly referred to as the Kubota Spears, is a professional Japanese rugby union team based in Funabashi, Chiba Prefecture participating in the Japan Rugby League One (JRLO). The team rebranded as Kubota Spears Funabashi Tokyo Bay ahead of the inaugural Japan Rugby League One season in 2022.

== History ==
The original rugby club was formed in 1978 by volunteers at the Kubota companies headquarters.

In 1984 the team won the Kanto Amateur League Division 4 and later on won the promotion match to be moved up to the Kanto Amateur League Division 3. After promotion in 1994 the team won all of their games in the Kanto Amateur League Division 2, and after winning the promotion match were finally promoted to the first division. In 1996 after only one year into them being in the first division, they had won their first championship, but later failed to win the promotion match 19-22 to enter the East Japan Amateur League. The year after in 1997 the team won their second championship and in 1998 they won their promotion match moving them up to the East Japan Amateur League.

In the early 2000's they continued to play in East Japan Amateur League continually placing around 3rd or 4th. During 2003 they had joined the Top League but had a rough time placing 8th, barely managing to stay in the league but they still had the opportunity to play in the Microsoft Cup and Japan Championship. During the mid 2000's they continually played poorly and ended up towards the bottom of the league multiple years in a row, and after a disappointing season in 2010 placing 13th with 1 win, 11 loses, and 1 draw, the team was automatically removed from the Top League. In 2012 the team had won the East Japan Amateur League again returning themselves to the Top League. In 2013 the Top League had rebranded and during this season they had won 9 games and lost 5 which was a considerable turn around from there previous time in the league. In 2016 they appointed a new head coach Frans Ludeke, and a new team captain Masamichi Tachikawa.

In 2021 they had beaten the Kobelco Kobe Steelers in the quarter finals and for the first time placed top 4 in the Top League. In 2022 they continued playing in the rebranded Japan Rugby League One, finishing the year in 3rd place. In 2023, the team had won a historic opening game against Tokyo Sungoliath, and had finished the season with 14 wins, 1 loss, and 1 draw. They beat Tokyo Sungoliath in the semi-finals and in the finals match against the Saitama Wild Knights they had won 17-15 securing the first ever league championship victory for the team.

During the 2024 season they had a harder season, struggling with the opening games and ended up at 6th place by the end of the season, not making it to the playoffs.

== Current squad ==
The Kubota Spears Funabashi Tokyo Bay squad for the 2026-27 season is:

Kubota Spears Funabashi Tokyo Bay squad
**Props**: (Japan) **Yota Kamimori**; (Japan) **Kota Kaishi**; (Japan) **Kengo Kitagawa**; (Japan) Kenshi Yamamoto; (Japan) Toi Kai; (Japan) **Keijiro Tamefusa**; (Japan) **Izi Sword***; (Japan) Satoshi Saita; (New Zealand) Keran van Staden; (Japan) Kazuki Kato; **Hookers**: (Japan) **Hayate Era**; (Japan) **Yoshimitsu Yasue**; (South Africa) **Malcolm Marx**; (Japan) Katsuya Ōkuma; (Japan) Masaki Shima; (Japan) Rikuto Fukuda; **Locks**: (Japan) **Ruan Botha***; (Japan) Naoaki Horibe; (Japan) Yūki Asai; (Australia) David Van Zeeland*; (Australia) Bailey Trew; (South Africa) **Ruan Nortjé**; (Japan) Yūki Aoki; (Japan) Daichi Kurihara; (New Zealand) Akira Ieremia**	**Flankers**: (Japan) Masaya Tamaki; (Japan) Kenkichi Yanagawa; (England) Harry Willard*; (South Africa) Merwe Olivier; (England) Ollie Stonham; (Japan) Toki Toshikawa; (Japan) Takeo Suenaga; (Japan) Ogi Yanamoto; (Japan) Yuma Uenobo; (Tonga) Finau Tupa**; **No8s**: (Japan) **Tyler Paul***; (Tonga) Asipeli Moala*; (Japan) **Faulua Makisi*** (c); (Tonga) Tisileli Loketi*; **Scrum-halves**: (Japan) **Shinobu Fujiwara**; (Japan) Kazuhiro Taniguchi; (Japan) Shunta Koga; (Japan) Genki Mizobuchi; (Japan) Ippei Okada; (Japan) Ryūsei Shibata; **Fly-halves**: (Japan) Tomoki Kishioka; (Japan) Atsushi Oshikawa	**Centres**: (Japan) **Harumichi Tatekawa**; (Japan) **Yūya Hirose**; (Japan) **Sione Teaupa**; (Japan) Towa Kondo; (South Africa) Rikus Pretorius*; (New Zealand) Bailyn Sullivan; (Japan) **Halatoa Vailea***; (Japan) Kanji Futamura; **Wingers**: (Japan) **Koga Nezuka**; (Japan) **Haruto Kida**; (Japan) Hiroyuki Yamasaki; (Fiji) Tsuyoshi Jennings**; (Japan) Reo Matsushita; **Fullbacks**: (Samoa) **Shaun Stevenson**; (Japan) Yūhei Shimada; (Japan) Hibiki Yamada; **Utility Backs**
(c) Denotes team captain, **Bold** denotes player is internationally capped.

  - denotes players qualified to play for Japan on dual nationality or residency grounds.

== Former players ==
- (Australia) Viliami Ofahengaue
- (Australia) Joe Roff - Fullback/wing
- (England) Barrie-Jon Mather - Centre/wing
- (New Zealand) Marty Veale - Lock
- Kōtarō Nakamura - Wing/fullback
- (New Zealand) Jason O'Halloran
- Cameron Pither
- Shunji Ishikura - Lock
- Joshua Fuimaono
- (Australia) Justin Sampson
- (Australia) Toutai Kefu
- (South Africa) Duane Vermeulen
- (New Zealand) Ryan Crotty
- (New Zealand) Dane Coles
- (Wales) Liam Williams

== Honors ==
- Japan Rugby League One:
  - Champions: 2023
  - Runners-up: 2025–26
- Kanto Amateur League – Division 1:
  - Champions: 1996, 1997
