= Kobelco Kobe Steelers =

Japanese rugby union team

Kobelco Kobe Steelers コベルコ神戸スティーラーズ
- Full name: Kobelco Kobe Steelers
- Founded: 1928; 98 years ago
- Location: Kobe, Hyogo, Japan
- Region: Hyogo Prefecture
- Grounds: Noevir Stadium Kobe (Capacity: 30,132); Kobe Universiade Memorial Stadium (Capacity: 36,000)
- Coach: Dave Rennie
- Captain(s): Brodie Retallick, Lee Seung-sin
- League: Japan Rugby League One
- 2025–26: 1st of 12, champions
| 1st kit | 2nd kit |

Official website
- www.kobesteelers.com

The Kobelco Kobe Steelers (Japanese: コベルコ神戸スティーラーズ), commonly referred to as simply the Kobe Steelers, is a professional Japanese rugby union team based in Kobe, Hyogo Prefecture and owned by the Kobe Steel company. The team compete in the Japan Rugby League One (JRLO) competition and have been playing under the Kobe Steelers name since the inaugural season in 2022.

== Current personnel ==
| Position | Name | Nationality |
|---|---|---|
| Director of rugby and head coach | Dave Rennie | New Zealand |
| Rugby Coach mentor/Team Ambassador | Wayne Smith | New Zealand |
| Attack coach | Mike Blair | Scotland |
| Defence coach | Peter Murchie | Scotland |
| Forwards coach | Dan McFarland | England |
| Scrum coach | Hisateru Hirashima | Japan |

== Current squad ==
The Kobelco Kobe Steelers squad for the 2026-27 season is:

Kobelco Kobe Steelers squad
| **Props**: (Japan) Shigure Takao; (Japan) Hikaru Moriwaki; (Japan) **Koo Ji-won**; (Japan) **Takayuki Watanabe**; (Japan) Sho Maeda; (Japan) Takashi Ōshita; (New Zealand) Kauvaka Kaivelata; (Japan) **Hiroshi Yamashita**; (Japan) Riku Tomita; **Hookers**: (Japan) Keita Miyauchi; (Japan) **Takuya Kitade**; (Japan) **Kenta Matsuoka**; (Tonga) Sione Sime Mau*; **Locks**: (New Zealand) **Brodie Retallick** (cc); (New Zealand) Gerard Cowley-Tuioti*; (South Africa) Neil Hansen; (Japan) Takuma Motohashi; (Ireland) Matthew Dalton | **Flankers**: (Japan) Hayato Fukunishi; (Japan) Takara Imamura; (Tonga) Solomone Funaki*; (New Zealand) Dominic Ropeti; (Japan) Hikaru Hashimoto; (South Africa) Nico Henrico*; **No8s**: (Tonga) Sione Polutele*; (South Africa) Willie Potgieter; (Japan) **Tiennan Costley***; **Scrum-halves**: (Japan) **Atsushi Hiwasa**; (Japan) **Daiki Nakajima**; (Japan) **Itsuki Kamimura**; (South Africa) **Grant Williams**; (Japan) Kenta Tokuda; **Fly-halves**: (New Zealand) Bryn Gatland | **Centres**: (Japan) Yoshiki Ōmachi; (Japan) **Timothy Lafaele**; (New Zealand) Michael Little*; (New Zealand) Mac Harris**; (New Zealand) Tali Ioasa; (Tonga) Talilotu Fakatulolo*; (New Zealand) **George Bridge**; **Wingers**: (Japan) **Ataata Moeakiola***; (Japan) **Inoke Burua***; (Japan) **Kazuma Ueda**; (Japan) Ryota Funabiki; **Fullbacks**: (Japan) Shinsuke Iseki; (Japan) Kanta Matsunaga; **Utility Backs**: (Japan) **Lee Seung-sin*** (cc); (Japan) **Shunsuke Uenobo**; (Japan) Daisuke Ito; (Japan) Hayata Tsujino |
(cc) denotes team co-captains.; **Bold** denotes internationally capped.

== Past players ==
- Yuta Imamura (2007–19, 124 games) Centre, Japanese international (2006–13, 39 caps)
- Itaru Taniguchi (2008–21, 148 games) Loose forward, Japanese international (2010–11, 10 caps)
- Shoji Ito (2009–18, 104 games) Lock, Japanese international (2012–15, 36 caps)

=== Japanese players ===
- Toshiyuki Hayashi
- Ian Williams
- Seiji Hirao
- Yuya Saito
- Kensuke Iwabuchi
- Daisuke Ohata
- Andrew Miller
- Atsushi Oyagi
- Kensuke Iwabuchi

=== Foreign players ===
- Ardie Savea
- Brodie Retallick
- Andy Ellis
- Dan Carter
- Adam Ashley-Cooper
- Aaron Cruden
- Andries Bekker
- Jacque Fourie
- Ron Cribb
- Dave Bickle
- Mark Egan
- Simon Wensley
- Pierre Hola
- Peter Grant
- Thinus Delport
- Ben Smith
- Lukhanyo Am
- Hayden Parker

== Honours ==
- Top League:
  - Champions: 2003–04, 2018–19
- Japan Rugby League One:
  - Champions: 2025–26
