= 2023 Rugby World Cup warm-up matches =

In July and August 2023, several rugby union national teams played matches in preparation for the 2023 Rugby World Cup. Some of the matches involving Tier 1 and 2 nations were played under the Summer Nations Series branding.

== Matches ==
=== 8 July ===
8 July 2023
17:00 JST (UTC+09)

Japan XV	6–38	All Blacks XV
Pen: Matsuda (2/2) 4', 22'		Try: Perofeta 14' m Goodhue 54' c Nanai-Seturo 61' m Nankivell 66' m Fakatava 80' c Con: Perofeta (1/2) 55'; Cameron (1/3) 80+1'; Pen: Perofeta (3/4) 18', 40+1', 44'

Chichibunomiya Rugby Stadium, Tokyo
Attendance: 22,283
Referee: Mike Adamson (Scotland)

=== 14/15 July ===
14 July 2023
15:00 TOT (UTC+13)

Tonga	27–21	Australia A
Try: Piutau 3' m Inisi 11' c Funaki 25' c Takulua 33' m Con: Havili (2/4) 12', 26'; Pen: Mausia (1/1) 76'	Report	Try: Toole 49' c Anderson 60' c Flook 71' c Con: Foley (3/3) 50', 61', 72'

Teufaiva Sport Stadium, Nukuʻalofa
Attendance: 10,000
Referee: Dan Waenga (New Zealand)

Team details

FB	15	Charles Piutau
RW	14	Israel Folau
OC	13	Malakai Fekitoa
IC	12	Pita Ahki
LW	11	Fine Inisi	(substituted off) 65'
FH	10	William Havili	(substituted off) 72'
SH	9	Sonatane Takulua (c)	(substituted off) 21'	(substituted on) 26'	(substituted off) 64'
N8	8	Vaea Fifita
OF	7	Solomone Funaki
BF	6	Tanginoa Halaifonua	(substituted off) 62'
RL	5	Sam Lousi
LL	4	Leva Fifita	(substituted off) 62'
TP	3	Ben Tameifuna	(substituted off) 50'
HK	2	Sam Moli	(substituted off) 40'
LP	1	Siegfried Fisi'ihoi	(substituted off) 50'
Replacements:
HK	16	Siua Maile	(substituted on) 40'
PR	17	Tau Koloamatangi	(substituted on) 50'
PR	18	David Lolohea	(substituted on) 50'
LK	19	Steve Mafi	(substituted on) 62'
FL	20	Sione Vailanu	(substituted on) 62'
SH	21	Manu Paea	(substituted on) 21'	(substituted off) 26'	(substituted on) 64'
FH	22	Otumaka Mausia	(substituted on) 72'
WG	23	Kyren Taumoefolau	(substituted on) 65'
Coach:
(Australia) Toutai Kefu

FB	15	Jock Campbell
RW	14	Lachie Anderson	(substituted off) 62'	(substituted on) 76'
OC	13	Joey Walton	(substituted off) 59'	(substituted on) 72'
IC	12	James O'Connor		(substituted off) 72'
LW	11	Corey Toole
FH	10	Bernard Foley (c)		(substituted off) 76'
SH	9	Jake Gordon	(substituted off) 40'
N8	8	Seru Uru	(substituted off) 40'
OF	7	Brad Wilkin
BF	6	Lachlan Swinton
RL	5	Cadeyrn Neville	(substituted off) 53'
LL	4	Lukhan Salakaia-Loto
TP	3	Taniela Tupou	(substituted off) 40'
HK	2	Folau Fainga'a	(substituted off) 40'
LP	1	Tom Lambert	(substituted off) 62'
Replacements:
HK	16	Lachlan Lonergan	(substituted on) 40'
PR	17	Angus Wagner	(substituted on) 62'
PR	18	Sam Talakai	(substituted on) 40'
LK	19	Ned Hanigan	(substituted on) 53'
N8	20	Harry Wilson	(substituted on) 40'
SH	21	Issak Fines-Leleiwasa	(substituted on) 40'
WG	22	Ollie Sapsford	(substituted on) 59'
CE	23	Josh Flook	(substituted on) 62'
Coach:
(Australia) Jason Gilmore

Assistant referees:
Marcus Playle (New Zealand)
Michael Winter (New Zealand)

Notes:

- Pita Ahki and Kyren Taumoefolau (both Tonga) made their international debuts.
- This was the first international match Tonga played at home since 2017.

15 July 2023
18:05 JST (UTC+09)

Japan	27–41	All Blacks XV
Try: Matsushima 24' c Masirewa (2) 53' c, 58' c Con: Lee Seung-sin (3/3) 25', 54', 60'; Pen: Lee Seung-sin (2/2) 11', 20'		Try: Proctor (4) 8' m, 29' c, 37' c, 50' c Perofeta 11' c Lam 42' m Con: Perofeta (4/6) 12', 30', 38', 51'; Pen: Perofeta (1/1) 35'

Egao Kenko Stadium, Kumamoto
Attendance: 19,586
Referee: Tual Trainini (France)

=== 22 July ===
22 July 2023
15:00 FJT (UTC+12)

(1 BP) Fiji	36–20	Tonga
Try: Penalty try 5'; Nayacalevu 7' m Matavesi 12' c Tuisova 40+1' c Matawalu 80' c Con: Muntz (3/4) 13', 40+3', 80+1'; Pen: Muntz (1/1) 68'		Try: Maile 15' m L. Fifita 20' c Taumoefolau 48' m Con: Mausia (1/3) 21'; Pen: Mausia (1/1) 26'

Churchill Park, Lautoka
Attendance: 15,000
Referee: Paul Williams (New Zealand)

Team details

FB	15	Sireli Maqala
RW	14	Jiuta Wainiqolo	(substituted off) 56'
OC	13	Waisea Nayacalevu (c)
IC	12	Josua Tuisova
LW	11	Selestino Ravutaumada
FH	10	Caleb Muntz
SH	9	Frank Lomani	(substituted off) 77'
N8	8	Albert Tuisue	(substituted off) 56'
OF	7	Levani Botia
BF	6	Lekima Tagitagivalu
RL	5	Temo Mayanavanua	(substituted off) 68'
LL	4	Isoa Nasilasila
TP	3	Mesake Doge	(substituted off) 56'
HK	2	Sam Matavesi	(substituted off) 60'
LP	1	Peni Ravai	(substituted off) 60'
Replacements:
HK	16	Tevita Ikanivere	(substituted on) 60'
PR	17	Eroni Mawi	(substituted on) 60'
PR	18	Luke Tagi	(substituted on) 56'
LK	19	Te Ahiwaru Cirikidaveta	(substituted on) 68'
FL	20	Viliame Mata	(substituted on) 56'
SH	21	Ratu Peni Matawalu	(substituted on) 77'
FH	22	Vilimoni Botitu
CE	23	Semi Radradra	(substituted on) 56'
Coach:
Simon Raiwalui

FB	15	Charles Piutau
RW	14	Fine Inisi		(substituted off) 44'
OC	13	Afusipa Taumoepeau
IC	12	Malakai Fekitoa
LW	11	Solomone Kata
FH	10	Otumaka Mausia		(substituted off) 60'
SH	9	Sonatane Takulua (c)		(substituted off) 68'
N8	8	Vaea Fifita		(substituted off) 58'
OF	7	Solomone Funaki
BF	6	Tanginoa Halaifonua	(yellow card) 5'
RL	5	Sam Lousi		(substituted off) 72'
LL	4	Leva Fifita
TP	3	Ben Tameifuna		(substituted off) 53'
HK	2	Siua Maile		(substituted off) 53'
LP	1	Siegfried Fisi'ihoi		(substituted off) 53'
Replacements:
HK	16	Sam Moli		(substituted on) 53'
PR	17	Feao Fotuaika		(substituted on) 53'
PR	18	Tau Koloamatangi		(substituted on) 53'
LK	19	Steve Mafi		(substituted on) 72'
N8	20	Sione Vailanu		(substituted on) 58'
SH	21	Manu Paea		(substituted on) 68'
FH	22	Patrick Pellegrini		(substituted on) 60'
WG	23	Kyren Taumoefolau		(substituted on) 44'
Coach:
Toutai Kefu

Assistant referees:
James Doleman (New Zealand)
Michael Winter (New Zealand)

Notes:

- Te Ahiwaru Cirikidaveta, Caleb Muntz, Selestino Ravutaumada, Lekima Tagitagivalu (all Fiji) and Patrick Pellegrini (Tonga) made their international debuts.

22 July 2023
14:50 JST (UTC+09)

(1 BP) Japan	22–24	Samoa
Try: Fakatava 6' c Con: Lee Seung-sin (1/1) 7'; Pen: Lee Seung-sin (5/5) 19', 42', 47', 57', 61'		Try: Motuga 37' c Taumateine 48' c Manu 63' c Con: Leali'ifano (3/3) 38', 50', 64'; Pen: Leali'ifano (1/1) 25'

Sapporo Dome, Sapporo
Attendance: 22,063
Referee: Mathieu Raynal (France)

Team details

FB	15	Ryohei Yamanaka
RW	14	Kotaro Matsushima
OC	13	Dylan Riley		(substituted off) 61'
IC	12	Shogo Nakano		(substituted off) 55'
LW	11	Jone Naikabula
FH	10	Lee Seung-sin		(substituted off) 71'
SH	9	Yutaka Nagare		(substituted off) 54'
N8	8	Michael Leitch	(red card) 30'
OF	7	Kazuki Himeno (cc)
BF	6	Jack Cornelsen
RL	5	Amato Fakatava		(substituted off) 64'
LL	4	James Moore
TP	3	Koo Ji-won		(substituted off) 65'
HK	2	Atsushi Sakate (cc)		(substituted off) 61'
LP	1	Keita Inagaki		(substituted off) 61'
Replacements:
HK	16	Shota Horie		(substituted on) 61'
PR	17	Craig Millar		(substituted on) 61'
PR	18	Shinnosuke Kakinaga		(substituted on) 66'
LK	19	Uwe Helu		(substituted on) 64'
FL	20	Shota Fukui		(substituted on) 55'
SH	21	Naoto Saito		(substituted on) 54'
FH	22	Rikiya Matsuda		(substituted on) 71'
CE	23	Tomoki Osada		(substituted on) 61'
Coach:
Jamie Joseph

FB	15	Danny Toala		(substituted off) 65'
RW	14	Neria Fomai		(substituted off) 58'
OC	13	UJ Seuteni
IC	12	Duncan Paia'aua
LW	11	Tumua Manu
FH	10	Christian Leali'ifano
SH	9	Jonathan Taumateine		(substituted off) 67'
N8	8	So'otala Fa'aso'o		(substituted off) 58'
OF	7	Alamanda Motuga
BF	6	Taleni Seu	(yellow card) 16'
RL	5	Michael Curry
LL	4	Brian Alainu'uese		(substituted off) 58'
TP	3	Paul Alo-Emile (c)		(substituted off) 53'
HK	2	Luteru Tolai		(substituted off) 53'
LP	1	Jordan Lay		(substituted off) 72'
Replacements:
HK	16	Ray Niuia		(substituted on) 53'
PR	17	Tietie Tuimauga		(substituted on) 72'
PR	18	Charlie Faumuina		(substituted on) 53'
LK	19	Genesis Mamea Lemalu		(substituted on) 58'
N8	20	Miracle Faiʻilagi		(substituted on) 58'
SH	21	Ere Enari		(substituted on) 67'
CE	22	Martini Talapusi		(substituted on) 65'
FB	23	Ed Fidow		(substituted on) 58'
Coach:
Seilala Mapusua

Assistant referees:
Jordan Way (Australia)
Pierre Brousset (France)
Television match official:
Eric Gauzins (France)

Notes:

- Amato Fakatava, Shota Fukui, Jone Naikabula, Tomoki Osada (all Japan), So'otala Fa'aso'o, Christian Leali'ifano, Charlie Faumuina, Miracle Faiʻilagi and Martini Talapusi (all Samoa) made their international debuts.
- This was Samoa's first win over Japan since their 27–26 win in 2012.

=== 29 July ===
29 July 2023
15:00 WST (UTC+13)

Samoa	19–33	Fiji (1 BP)
Try: Leali'ifano 20' m Manu 45' c Lee 60' c Con: Leali'ifano (2/3) 46', 62'		Try: Ikanivere (2) 6' m, 16' m Masi 12' c Ravutaumada 30' c Con: Muntz (2/4) 12', 32'; Pen: Muntz (3/4) 24', 40', 54'

Apia Park, Apia
Attendance: 8,000
Referee: Angus Gardner (Australia)

Team details

FB	15	Danny Toala	(substituted off) 54'
RW	14	Nigel Ah Wong
OC	13	Stacey Ili
IC	12	Duncan Paia'aua
LW	11	Tumua Manu	(substituted off) 67'
FH	10	Christian Leali'ifano
SH	9	Ere Enari	(substituted off) 55'
N8	8	Fritz Lee (c)
OF	7	Jack Lam	(substituted off) 46'
BF	6	Steve Luatua	(substituted off) 54'
RL	5	Taleni Seu
LL	4	Chris Vui
TP	3	Paul Alo-Emile	(substituted off) 62'
HK	2	Ray Niuia	(substituted off) 37'
LP	1	Jordan Lay	(substituted off) 55'
Replacements:
HK	16	Sama Malolo	(substituted on) 37'
PR	17	Tietie Tuimauga	(substituted on) 55'
PR	18	Charlie Faumuina	(substituted on) 62'
LK	19	Brian Alainu'uese	(substituted on) 54'
FL	20	Genesis Mamea Lemalu	(substituted on) 46'
SH	21	Melani Matavao	(substituted on) 55'
FH	22	D'Angelo Leuila	(substituted on) 67'
WG	23	Ed Fidow	(substituted on) 54'
Coach:
Seilala Mapusua

FB	15	Ilaisa Droasese
RW	14	Selestino Ravutaumada
OC	13	Iosefo Masi	(substituted off) 68'
IC	12	Semi Radradra (c)
LW	11	Kalaveti Ravouvou	(substituted off) 57'
FH	10	Caleb Muntz
SH	9	Simione Kuruvoli	(substituted off) 40'
N8	8	Viliame Mata
OF	7	Vilive Miramira	(substituted off) 67'
BF	6	Meli Derenalagi
RL	5	Isoa Nasilasila
LL	4	Te Ahiwaru Cirikidaveta	(substituted off) 57'
TP	3	Luke Tagi	(substituted off) 62'
HK	2	Tevita Ikanivere	(substituted off) 67'
LP	1	Eroni Mawi	(substituted off) 62'
Replacements:
HK	16	Zuriel Togiatama	(substituted on) 67'
PR	17	Peni Ravai	(substituted on) 62'
PR	18	Samu Tawake	(substituted on) 62'
FL	19	Joseva Tamani	(substituted on) 57'
FL	20	Kitione Kamikamica	(substituted on) 67'
SH	21	Ratu Peni Matawalu	(substituted on) 40'
CE	22	Vilimoni Botitu	(substituted on) 57'
CE	23	Josua Tuisova	(substituted on) 68'
Coach:
Simon Raiwalui

Assistant referees:
James Doleman (New Zealand)
Matthew Kellahan (Australia)

Notes:

- Sama Malolo and Steve Luatua (both Samoa) and Meli Derenalagi, Ilaisa Droasese Iosefo Masi, Vilive Miramira and Joseva Tamani (all Fiji) made their international debuts.

29 July 2023
19:30 JST (UTC+09)

Japan	21–16	Tonga (1 BP)
Try: Naikabula 20' m Fakatava 40' m Masirewa 53' m Pen: Lee Seung-sin (1/1) 32'; Matsuda (1/1) 67'		Try: Takulua 23' m Moli 57' m Pen: Havili (2/2) 42', 47'

Hanazono Rugby Stadium, Higashiōsaka
Attendance: 27,346
Referee: Matthew Carley (England)

Team details

FB	15	Ryohei Yamanaka	(substituted off) 64'
RW	14	Jone Naikabula
OC	13	Dylan Riley
IC	12	Tomoki Osada
LW	11	Semisi Masirewa
FH	10	Lee Seung-sin	(substituted off) 47'
SH	9	Naoto Saito	(substituted off) 53'
N8	8	Kazuki Himeno (c)
OF	7	Ben Gunter	(substituted off) 59'
BF	6	Jack Cornelsen
RL	5	Uwe Helu	(substituted off) 47'
LL	4	Amato Fakatava
TP	3	Asaeli Ai Valu	(substituted off) 53'
HK	2	Atsushi Sakate	(substituted off) 59'
LP	1	Keita Inagaki	(substituted off) 59'
Replacements:
HK	16	Shota Horie	(substituted on) 59'
PR	17	Craig Millar	(substituted on) 59'
PR	18	Koo Ji-won	(substituted on) 53'
LK	19	James Moore	(substituted on) 47'
N8	20	Tevita Tatafu	(substituted on) 59'
SH	21	Yutaka Nagare	(substituted on) 53'
FH	22	Rikiya Matsuda	(substituted on) 47'
WG	23	Kotaro Matsushima	(substituted on) 64'
Coach:
Jamie Joseph

FB	15	Charles Piutau
RW	14	Solomone Kata
OC	13	Afusipa Taumoepeau
IC	12	Pita Ahki
LW	11	Kyren Taumoefolau	(substituted off) 64'
FH	10	William Havili	(substituted off) 73'
SH	9	Sonatane Takulua (c)	(substituted off) 67'
N8	8	Lopeti Timani	(substituted off) 47'
OF	7	Sione Havili Talitui
BF	6	Vaea Fifita
RL	5	Steve Mafi	(substituted off) 47'
LL	4	Leva Fifita
TP	3	Ben Tameifuna	(substituted off) 69'
HK	2	Sam Moli	(substituted off) 69'
LP	1	Siegfried Fisi'ihoi	(substituted off) 69'
Replacements:
HK	16	Paul Ngauamo	(substituted on) 69'
PR	17	Feao Fotuaika	(substituted on) 69'
PR	18	David Lolohea	(substituted on) 69'
FL	19	Tanginoa Halaifonua	(substituted on) 47'
FL	20	Solomone Funaki	(substituted on) 47'
SH	21	Manu Paea	(substituted on) 67'
FH	22	Otumaka Mausia	(substituted on) 73'
CE	23	Malakai Fekitoa	(substituted on) 64'
Coach:
Toutai Kefu

Assistant referees:
Damon Murphy (Australia)
Jordan Way (Australia)
Television match official:
Eric Gauzins (France)

Notes:

- Sonatane Takulua (Tonga) became the first Tongan to reach the milestone of 50 test caps.

29 July 2023
15:15 BST (UTC+01)

Scotland	25–13	Italy
Try: Graham (2) 13' m, 56' c Bayliss 80' c Con: Healy (2/3) 57', 80+1'; Pen: Healy (2/2) 48', 74'	Report	Try: Ioane 62' c Con: Allan (1/1) 63'; Pen: Allan (2/2) 26', 40+2'

Murrayfield Stadium, Edinburgh
Attendance: 49,977
Referee: Ben O'Keeffe (New Zealand)

Team details

FB	15	Ollie Smith
RW	14	Darcy Graham	(substituted off) 72'
OC	13	Chris Harris	(substituted off) 57'
IC	12	Stafford McDowall
LW	11	Kyle Steyn
FH	10	Ben Healy
SH	9	Ali Price	(substituted off) 58'
N8	8	Matt Fagerson
OF	7	Rory Darge (c)
BF	6	Luke Crosbie	(substituted off) 70'
RL	5	Scott Cummings	(substituted off) 65'
LL	4	Sam Skinner
TP	3	Murphy Walker	(substituted off) 47'
HK	2	George Turner	(substituted off) 46'
LP	1	Rory Sutherland	(substituted off) 40'
Replacements:
HK	16	Stuart McInally	(substituted on) 46'
PR	17	Jamie Bhatti	(substituted on) 40'
PR	18	Javan Sebastian	(substituted on) 47'
LK	19	Cameron Henderson	(substituted on) 65'
FL	20	Josh Bayliss	(substituted on) 70'
SH	21	Jamie Dobie	(substituted on) 58'
FH	22	Blair Kinghorn	(substituted on) 72'
CE	23	Cameron Redpath	(substituted on) 57'
Coach:
(Scotland) Gregor Townsend

FB	15	Lorenzo Pani
RW	14	Pierre Bruno	(substituted off) 52'
OC	13	Tommaso Menoncello
IC	12	Luca Morisi	(substituted off) 60'
LW	11	Monty Ioane
FH	10	Tommaso Allan
SH	9	Martin Page-Relo	(substituted off) 61'
N8	8	Toa Halafihi
OF	7	Manuel Zuliani	(substituted off) 52'
BF	6	Federico Ruzza (c)
RL	5	Andrea Zambonin
LL	4	Dave Sisi	(substituted off) 57'
TP	3	Pietro Ceccarelli	(substituted off) 60'
HK	2	Hame Faiva	(substituted off) 59'
LP	1	Federico Zani	(substituted off) 52'
Replacements:
HK	16	Marco Manfredi	(substituted on) 59'
PR	17	Danilo Fischetti	(substituted on) 52'
PR	18	Filippo Alongi	(substituted on) 60'
LK	19	Edoardo Iachizzi	(substituted on) 57'
N8	20	Lorenzo Cannone	(substituted on) 52'
SH	21	Alessandro Garbisi	(substituted on) 52'
FH	22	Giacomo Da Re	(substituted on) 61'
CE	23	Federico Mori	(substituted on) 60'
Coach:
(New Zealand) Kieran Crowley

Player of the Match:
Ben Healy (Scotland)

Assistant referees:
Mathieu Raynal (France)
Adam Leal (England)
Television match official:
Ben Whitehouse (Wales)
Foul play review officer:
Ian Tempest (England)

Notes:

- Cameron Henderson, Stafford McDowall (both Scotland), Martin Page-Relo and Lorenzo Pani (both Italy) made their international debuts.

29 July 2023
13:30 UYT (UTC-03)

Namibia	27–34	Argentina XV
Try: Van Jaarsveld (3) 35' m, 49' c, 65' c Conradie 68' m Con: Swanepoel (2/4) 50', 66'; Pen: Swanepoel (1/1) 5'	Report	Try: De la Vega Mendía 11' c Bogado 16' c González 21' m Lavanini 25' c Delguy 74' m Con: De la Vega Mendía (3/5) 12', 17', 26'; Pen: De la Vega Mendía (1/1) 69'

Estadio Charrúa, Montevideo, Uruguay
Referee: Craig Evans (Wales)

29 July 2023
16:00 UYT (UTC-03)

Uruguay	26–25	Chile
Try: Penalty try 12'; Basso 18' c Ardao 29' m Inciarte 74' c Con: Etcheverry (2/3) 19', 75'	Report	Try: Martínez 46' m Ayarza 69' c Garafulic 80' c Con: Videla (2/3) 70', 80'; Pen: Videla (2/2) 4', 27'

Estadio Charrúa, Montevideo
Referee: Luke Pearce (England)

Team details

FB	15	Baltazar Amaya	(substituted off) 65'
RW	14	Bautista Basso	(substituted off) 65'
OC	13	Tomás Inciarte
IC	12	Andrés Vilaseca (c)
LW	11	Nicolás Freitas
FH	10	Felipe Etcheverry
SH	9	Santiago Álvarez	(substituted off) 63'
N8	8	Manuel Diana
OF	7	Lucas Bianchi	(substituted off) 63'
BF	6	Manuel Ardao
RL	5	Manuel Leindekar	(substituted off) 56'
LL	4	Felipe Aliaga
TP	3	Ignacio Péculo	(substituted off) 62'
HK	2	Germán Kessler	(substituted off) 56'
LP	1	Mateo Sanguinetti	(substituted off) 55'
Replacements:
HK	16	Guillermo Pujadas	(substituted on) 56'
PR	17	Facundo Gattas	(substituted on) 55'
PR	18	Reinaldo Piussi	(substituted on) 62'
FL	19	Juan Manuel Rodríguez	(substituted on) 56'
FL	20	Santiago Civetta	(substituted on) 63'
FH	21	Felipe Berchesi	(substituted on) 65'
FB	22	Gastón Mieres	(substituted on) 63'
WG	23	Juan Manuel Alonso	(substituted on) 65'
Coach:
(Argentina) Esteban Meneses

FB	15	Iñaki Ayarza	(yellow card) 15'
RW	14	Cristobal Game
OC	13	Pablo Casas		(substituted off) 73'
IC	12	Matías Garafulic
LW	11	Santiago Videla
FH	10	Rodrigo Fernández (c)
SH	9	Marcelo Torrealba
N8	8	Alfonso Escobar
OF	7	Ignacio Silva	(yellow card) 12'	(substituted off) 40'
BF	6	Clemente Saavedra
RL	5	Pablo Huete		(substituted off) 55'
LL	4	Javier Eissmann
TP	3	Matías Dittus		(substituted off) 55'
HK	2	Augusto Böhme		(substituted off) 56'
LP	1	Javier Carrasco		(substituted off) 56'
Replacements:
HK	16	Diego Escobar		(substituted on) 56'
PR	17	Salvador Lues		(substituted on) 56'
PR	18	Iñaki Gurruchaga		(substituted on) 55'
LK	19	Santiago Pedrero		(substituted on) 55'
FL	20	Joaquín Milesi
FL	21	Raimundo Martínez		(substituted on) 40'
SH	22	Lukas Carvallo
FB	23	Francisco Urroz		(substituted on) 73'
Coach:
(Uruguay) Pablo Lemoine

Assistant referees:
Nehuen Jauri Rivero (Argentina)
Damian Schneider (Argentina)

Notes:

- Cristobal Game (Chile) made his international debut.

=== 5 August ===
5 August 2023
15:00 WST (UTC+13)

(1 BP) Samoa	34–9	Tonga
Try: Malolo 24' c Faiʻilagi 47' c Paia'aua 58' c Matavao 64' c Con: Leuila (4/4) 25', 48', 59', 65'; Pen: Leuila (2/2) 16', 40'		Pen: Havili (1/1) 5'; Mausia (2/2) 30', 37'

Apia Park, Apia
Attendance: 4,000
Referee: Angus Gardner (Australia)

Team details

FB	15	Tim Nanai-Williams
RW	14	Nigel Ah Wong	(substituted off) 61'
OC	13	UJ Seuteni	(substituted off) 30'
IC	12	Duncan Paia'aua
LW	11	Ed Fidow
FH	10	D'Angelo Leuila
SH	9	Jonathan Taumateine	(substituted off) 57'
N8	8	Steve Luatua
OF	7	Jack Lam	(substituted off) 46'
BF	6	Miracle Faiʻilagi	(substituted off) 46'
RL	5	Brian Alainu'uese
LL	4	Chris Vui
TP	3	Michael Alaalatoa (c)	(substituted off) 48'
HK	2	Sama Malolo	(substituted off) 46'
LP	1	Charlie Faumuina	(substituted off) 48'
Replacements:
HK	16	Luteru Tolai	(substituted on) 46'
PR	17	Titi Lamositele	(substituted on) 48'
PR	18	Paul Alo-Emile	(substituted on) 48'
LK	19	Theo McFarland	(substituted on) 46'
N8	20	Fritz Lee	(substituted on) 46'
SH	21	Melani Matavao	(substituted on) 57'
FH	22	Christian Leali'ifano	(substituted on) 30'
WG	23	Neria Fomai	(substituted on) 61'
Coach:
Seilala Mapusua

FB	15	Charles Piutau	(substituted off) 44'
RW	14	Solomone Kata
OC	13	George Moala
IC	12	Pita Ahki
LW	11	Afusipa Taumoepeau
FH	10	William Havili	(substituted off) 25'
SH	9	Sonatane Takulua (c)	(substituted off) 52'
N8	8	Vaea Fifita
OF	7	Sione Havili Talitui	(substituted off) 65'
BF	6	Tanginoa Halaifonua
RL	5	Steve Mafi	(substituted off) 49'
LL	4	Leva Fifita
TP	3	Ben Tameifuna	(substituted off) 61'
HK	2	Siua Maile	(substituted off) 57'
LP	1	Siegfried Fisi'ihoi	(substituted off) 66'
Replacements:
HK	16	Paul Ngauamo	(substituted on) 57'
PR	17	Tau Koloamatangi	(substituted on) 66'
PR	18	David Lolohea	(substituted on) 61'
LK	19	Lopeti Timani	(substituted on) 49'
FL	20	Solomone Funaki	(substituted on) 65'
SH	21	Manu Paea	(substituted on) 52'
FH	22	Otumaka Mausia	(substituted on) 25'
CE	23	Malakai Fekitoa	(substituted on) 44'
Coach:
Toutai Kefu

Assistant referees:
Damon Murphy (Australia)
Matthew Kellahan (Australia)

5 August 2023
14:35 NZST (UTC+12)

New Zealand	23–20	Australia
Try: Stevenson 43' c Finau 63' c Con: McKenzie (1/1) 44'; Mo'unga (1/1) 64'; Pen: McKenzie (1/1) 13'; Mo'unga (2/2) 57', 79'	Report	Try: Koroibete 2' c Hooper 6' c Con: Gordon (2/2) 2', 7'; Pen: Gordon (1/2) 22'; Cooper (1/1) 72'

Forsyth Barr Stadium, Dunedin
Attendance: 28,000
Referee: Karl Dickson (England)

Team details

FB	15	Will Jordan
RW	14	Shaun Stevenson
OC	13	Braydon Ennor	(substituted off) 39'
IC	12	Anton Lienert-Brown
LW	11	Leicester Fainga'anuku
FH	10	Damian McKenzie	(substituted off) 48'
SH	9	Finlay Christie	(substituted off) 52'
N8	8	Ardie Savea
OF	7	Sam Cane (c)	(substituted off) 70'
BF	6	Samipeni Finau
RL	5	Sam Whitelock
LL	4	Brodie Retallick	(substituted off) 25'
TP	3	Nepo Laulala	(substituted off) 48'
HK	2	Samisoni Taukei'aho	(substituted off) 52'
LP	1	Tamaiti Williams	(substituted off) 48'
Replacements:
HK	16	Dane Coles	(substituted on) 52'
PR	17	Ofa Tu'ungafasi	(substituted on) 48'
PR	18	Fletcher Newell	(substituted on) 48'
LK	19	Tupou Vaa'i	(substituted on) 25'
FL	20	Luke Jacobson	(substituted on) 70'
SH	21	Aaron Smith	(substituted on) 52'
FH	22	Richie Mo'unga	(substituted on) 48'
CE	23	Dallas McLeod	(substituted on) 39'
Coach:
(New Zealand) Ian Foster

FB	15	Andrew Kellaway
RW	14	Mark Nawaqanitawase
OC	13	Jordan Petaia
IC	12	Samu Kerevi	(substituted off) 75'
LW	11	Marika Koroibete
FH	10	Carter Gordon	(substituted off) 64'
SH	9	Tate McDermott (c)	(substituted off) 64'
N8	8	Rob Valetini
OF	7	Fraser McReight	(substituted off) 59'
BF	6	Tom Hooper
RL	5	Richie Arnold	(substituted off) 50'
LL	4	Nick Frost
TP	3	Pone Fa'amausili	(substituted off) 44'	(substituted on) 55'	(substituted off) 67'
HK	2	Dave Porecki	(substituted off) 14'
LP	1	Angus Bell	(substituted off) 55'
Replacements:
HK	16	Matt Faessler	(substituted on) 14'
PR	17	James Slipper	(substituted on) 55'
PR	18	Zane Nonggorr	(substituted on) 44'	(substituted off) 55'	(substituted on) 67'
LK	19	Will Skelton	(substituted on) 50'
FL	20	Rob Leota	(substituted on) 59'
SH	21	Nic White	(substituted on) 64'
FH	22	Quade Cooper	(substituted on) 64'
CE	23	Izaia Perese	(substituted on) 75'
Coach:
(Australia) Eddie Jones

Assistant referees:
Wayne Barnes (England)
Christophe Ridley (England)
Television match official:
Marius Jonker (South Africa)
Foul play review officer:
Tom Foley (England)

Notes:

- Dallas McLeod, Samipeni Finau, Shaun Stevenson (all New Zealand) and Matt Faessler (Australia) made their international debuts.

5 August 2023
19:15 JST (UTC+09)

Japan	12–35	Fiji (1 BP)
Try: Naikabula 71' c Masirewa 77' m Con: Lee Seung-sin (1/2) 72'		Try: Nayacalevu 4' c Mawi 17' c Kuruvoli 38' c Lomani (2) 58' c, 81' c Con: Volavola (4/4) 5', 18', 39', 59'; Tela (1/1) 82'

Chichibunomiya Rugby Stadium, Tokyo
Attendance: 27,000
Referee: Matthew Carley (England)

Team details

FB	15	Kotaro Matsushima
RW	14	Semisi Masirewa
OC	13	Dylan Riley	(substituted off) 62'
IC	12	Tomoki Osada
LW	11	Jone Naikabula
FH	10	Rikiya Matsuda	(substituted off) 56'
SH	9	Naoto Saito	(substituted off) 40'
N8	8	Kazuki Himeno (c)	(substituted off) 59'
OF	7	Lappies Labuschagné
BF	6	Jack Cornelsen
RL	5	Amato Fakatava	(substituted off) 23'
LL	4	James Moore
TP	3	Asaeli Ai Valu	(substituted off) 40'
HK	2	Atsushi Sakate	(substituted off) 40'
LP	1	Keita Inagaki	(substituted off) 40'
Replacements:
HK	16	Shota Horie	(substituted on) 40'
PR	17	Craig Millar	(substituted on) 40'
PR	18	Koo Ji-won	(substituted on) 40'
FL	19	Kanji Shimokawa	(substituted on) 23'
FL	20	Ben Gunter	(substituted on) 59'
SH	21	Yutaka Nagare	(substituted on) 40'
FH	22	Lee Seung-sin	(substituted on) 56'
CE	23	Ryoto Nakamura	(substituted on) 62'
Coach:
Jamie Joseph

FB	15	Sireli Maqala
RW	14	Jiuta Wainiqolo
OC	13	Waisea Nayacalevu (c)
IC	12	Vilimoni Botitu	(substituted off) 19'
LW	11	Selestino Ravutaumada
FH	10	Ben Volavola	(substituted off) 60'
SH	9	Simione Kuruvoli	(substituted off) 49'
N8	8	Meli Derenalagi
OF	7	Kitione Kamikamica	(substituted off) 53'
BF	6	Lekima Tagitagivalu
RL	5	Temo Mayanavanua	(substituted off) 66'
LL	4	Albert Tuisue
TP	3	Luke Tagi	(substituted off) 49'
HK	2	Sam Matavesi	(substituted off) 49'
LP	1	Eroni Mawi	(substituted off) 49'	(substituted off) 79'
Replacements:
HK	16	Tevita Ikanivere	(substituted on) 49'
PR	17	Peni Ravai	(substituted on) 49'	(substituted on) 79'
PR	18	Mesake Doge	(substituted on) 49'
LK	19	Te Ahiwaru Cirikidaveta	(substituted on) 66'
FL	20	Joseva Tamani	(substituted on) 53'
SH	21	Frank Lomani	(substituted on) 49'
FH	22	Teti Tela	(substituted on) 19'
CE	23	Ilaisa Droasese	(substituted on) 60'
Coach:
Simon Raiwalui

Assistant referees:
James Doleman (New Zealand)
Takehito Namekawa (Japan)
Television match official:
Brendon Pickerill (New Zealand)

Notes:

- Kotaro Matsushima (Japan) earned his 50th test cap.
- This was Fiji's first win over Japan in Japan since their 25–19 victory in 2012.

5 August 2023
15:15 BST (UTC+01)

Scotland	25–21	France
Try: Graham 43' c Schoeman 54' c Cherry 64' m Con: Russell (2/3) 44', 55'; Pen: Russell (2/2) 5', 73'	Report	Try: Couilloud 12' c Bielle-Biarrey 25' c Woki 40+3' c Con: Jalibert (3/3) 13', 26', 40+4'

Murrayfield Stadium, Edinburgh
Attendance: 56,256
Referee: Ben O'Keeffe (New Zealand)

Team details

FB	15	Blair Kinghorn
RW	14	Darcy Graham
OC	13	Huw Jones
IC	12	Sione Tuipulotu		(substituted off) 58'
LW	11	Duhan van der Merwe
FH	10	Finn Russell (c)
SH	9	Ben White		(substituted off) 31'
N8	8	Jack Dempsey		(substituted off) 58'
OF	7	Hamish Watson		(substituted off) 58'
BF	6	Matt Fagerson
RL	5	Grant Gilchrist		(substituted off) 72'
LL	4	Richie Gray
TP	3	Zander Fagerson	(red card) 51'
HK	2	Ewan Ashman		(substituted off) 58'
LP	1	Pierre Schoeman		(substituted off) 58'
Replacements:
HK	16	Dave Cherry		(substituted on) 58'
PR	17	Jamie Bhatti		(substituted on) 58'
PR	18	WP Nel		(substituted on) 58'
LK	19	Scott Cummings		(substituted on) 72'
FL	20	Rory Darge		(substituted on) 58'
SH	21	George Horne		(substituted on) 31'
CE	22	Cameron Redpath		(substituted on) 58'
FB	23	Ollie Smith
Coach:
(Scotland) Gregor Townsend

FB	15	Brice Dulin (c)
RW	14	Louis Bielle-Biarrey
OC	13	Émilien Gailleton
IC	12	Yoram Moefana
LW	11	Ethan Dumortier	(substituted off) 58'
FH	10	Matthieu Jalibert	(substituted off) 62'
SH	9	Baptiste Couilloud	(substituted off) 69'
N8	8	Yoan Tanga
OF	7	Sekou Macalou	(substituted off) 57'
BF	6	Paul Boudehent
RL	5	Bastien Chalureau	(substituted off) 57'
LL	4	Cameron Woki
TP	3	Demba Bamba	(substituted off) 47'
HK	2	Pierre Bourgarit	(substituted off) 57'
LP	1	Jean-Baptiste Gros	(substituted off) 57'
Replacements:
HK	16	Peato Mauvaka	(substituted on) 57'
PR	17	Reda Wardi	(substituted on) 57'
PR	18	Sipili Falatea	(substituted on) 47'
LK	19	Paul Willemse	(substituted on) 57'
FL	20	Dylan Cretin	(substituted on) 57'
SH	21	Baptiste Serin	(substituted on) 69'
FH	22	Antoine Hastoy	(substituted on) 62'
CE	23	Arthur Vincent	(substituted on) 58'
Coach:
(France) Fabien Galthié

Player of the Match:
Blair Kinghorn (Scotland)

Assistant referees:
Frank Murphy (Ireland)
Federico Vedovelli (Italy)
Television match official:
Ben Whitehouse (Wales)
Foul play review officer:
Ian Tempest (England)

Notes:

- Louis Bielle-Biarrey, Paul Boudehent and Émilien Gailleton (all France) made their international debuts.

5 August 2023
17:30 BST (UTC+01)

Wales	20–9	England
Try: Davies 47' c North 57' c Con: Halfpenny (2/2) 48', 58'; Pen: Halfpenny (2/2) 17', 25'	Report	Pen: Smith (3/3) 7', 13', 40+2'

Millennium Stadium, Cardiff
Attendance: 65,802
Referee: Nic Berry (Australia)

Team details

FB	15	Leigh Halfpenny
RW	14	Louis Rees-Zammit
OC	13	George North
IC	12	Max Llewellyn
LW	11	Rio Dyer
FH	10	Sam Costelow	(substituted off) 54'
SH	9	Gareth Davies	(substituted off) 54'
N8	8	Aaron Wainwright
OF	7	Jac Morgan (c)
BF	6	Christ Tshiunza	(substituted off) 49'
RL	5	Will Rowlands	(substituted off) 49'
LL	4	Dafydd Jenkins	(substituted off) 59'
TP	3	Kieron Assiratti	(substituted off) 49'
HK	2	Ryan Elias	(substituted off) 6'
LP	1	Corey Domachowski	(substituted off) 49'
Replacements:
HK	16	Elliot Dee	(substituted on) 6'
PR	17	Nicky Smith	(substituted on) 49'
PR	18	Henry Thomas	(substituted on) 49'
LK	19	Ben Carter	(substituted on) 49'
FL	20	Taine Plumtree	(substituted on) 49'
SH	21	Tomos Williams	(substituted on) 54'
FH	22	Dan Biggar	(substituted on) 54'
CE	23	Mason Grady	(substituted on) 59'
Coach:
(New Zealand) Warren Gatland

FB	15	Freddie Steward
RW	14	Max Malins
OC	13	Joe Marchant
IC	12	Guy Porter
LW	11	Joe Cokanasiga	(substituted off) 68'
FH	10	Marcus Smith	(substituted off) 59'
SH	9	Danny Care	(substituted off) 49'
N8	8	Alex Dombrandt	(substituted off) 54'
OF	7	Tom Pearson
BF	6	Lewis Ludlam
RL	5	George Martin
LL	4	David Ribbans	(substituted off) 45'
TP	3	Will Stuart	(substituted off) 54'
HK	2	Jamie Blamire	(substituted off) 54'
LP	1	Ellis Genge (c)	(substituted off) 68'
Replacements:
HK	16	Theo Dan	(substituted on) 54'
PR	17	Bevan Rodd	(substituted on) 68'
PR	18	Kyle Sinckler	(substituted on) 54'
LK	19	Jonny Hill	(substituted on) 45'
N8	20	Tom Willis	(substituted on) 54'
SH	21	Jack van Poortvliet	(substituted on) 49'
FH	22	George Ford	(substituted on) 59'
CE	23	Henry Slade	(substituted on) 68'
Coach:
(England) Steve Borthwick

Player of the Match:
Jac Morgan (Wales)

Assistant referees:
Mike Adamson (Scotland)
Andrea Piardi (Italy)
Television match official:
Joy Neville (Ireland)
Foul play review officer:
Marius van der Westhuizen (South Africa)

Notes:

- Kieron Assiratti, Corey Domachowski, Max Llewellyn, Taine Plumtree, Henry Thomas (all Wales), Theo Dan, Tom Pearson and Tom Willis (all England) made their international debuts.
- Leigh Halfpenny became the ninth Welshman to earn 100 test caps.

5 August 2023
20:00 EEST (UTC+03)

Romania	17–31	United States
Try: Surugiu 61' c Sikuea 65' m Simionescu 74' m Con: Mureșan (1/3) 62'	Report	Try: Dolan 6' c McCarthy 24' m Dyer 38' c Penalty try 46' m Ryan 55' m Con: Carty (2/4) 7', 40'

Stadionul Arcul de Triumf, Bucharest
Referee: Sam Grove-White (Scotland)

Team details

FB	15	Hinckley Vaovasa
RW	14	Marius Simionescu
OC	13	Jason Tomane		(substituted off) 64'
IC	12	Manumua Tevita
LW	11	Sikuea Taliuli
FH	10	Gabriel Pop		(substituted off) 40'
SH	9	Alin Conache		(substituted off) 40'
N8	8	Cristi Chirică
OF	7	Cristi Boboc		(substituted off) 57'
BF	6	Mihai Macovei (c)		(substituted off) 50'	(substituted on) 57'
RL	5	Andrei Mahu		(substituted off) 52'
LL	4	Marius Iftimiciuc
TP	3	Gheorghe Gajion		(substituted off) 57'
HK	2	Ovidiu Cojocaru		(substituted off) 55'
LP	1	Alexandru Savin	(yellow card) 47'			(substituted off) 63'
Replacements:
HK	16	Florin Bărdașu		(substituted on) 55'
PR	17	Iulian Harțig		(substituted on) 50'	(substituted off) 57'	(substituted on) 63'
PR	18	Alexandru Gordaș		(substituted on) 57'
LK	19	Ștefan Iancu		(substituted on) 52'
FL	20	Vlad Neculau		(substituted on) 57'
SH	21	Florin Surugiu		(substituted on) 40'
FH	22	Mihai Muresan		(substituted on) 40'
FB	23	Ionel Melinte		(substituted on) 64'
Coach:
(Romania) Eugen Apjok

FB	15	Mitch Wilson
RW	14	Christian Dyer
OC	13	Mika Kruse
IC	12	Tommaso Boni	(substituted off) 63'
LW	11	Nate Augspurger
FH	10	Luke Carty	(substituted off) 76'
SH	9	Nick McCarthy	(substituted off) 60'
N8	8	Luke White
OF	7	Paddy Ryan
BF	6	Sam Golla
RL	5	Greg Peterson (c)	(substituted off) 67'
LL	4	Cam Dolan
TP	3	Paul Mullen	(substituted off) 79'
HK	2	Dylan Fawsitt	(substituted off) 63'
LP	1	Jack Iscaro	(substituted off) 63'
Replacements:
HK	16	Joe Taufeteʻe	(substituted on) 63'
PR	17	Jake Turnbull	(substituted on) 63'
PR	18	Takaji Young Yen	(substituted on) 79'
LK	19	Nate Brakeley	(substituted on) 67'
FL	20	Thomas Tu’avao	(substituted on) 67'
SH	21	Ruben de Haas	(substituted on) 60'
FB	22	Chris Mattina	(substituted on) 76'
CE	23	Tavite Lopeti	(substituted on) 63'
Coach:
(United States) Scott Lawrence

Assistant referees:
Anthony Woodthorpe (England)
Hollie Davidson (Scotland)
Television match official:
Matteo Liperini (Italy)

Notes:

- Andrei Mahu, Sikuea Taliuli, Manumua Tevita (all Romania), Tommaso Boni, Sam Golla, Chris Mattina, Nick McCarthy, Paddy Ryan, Thomas Tu’avao, Jake Turnbull, Luke White and Takaji Young Yen (all United States) made their international debuts.

5 August 2023
20:00 IST (UTC+01)

Ireland	33–17	Italy
Try: Kilcoyne 12' c Doris (2) 30' c, 73' c McCloskey 36' c Healy 65' m Con: Crowley (3/4) 13', 31', 37'; Frawley (1/1) 74'	Report	Try: Pani 51' c Menoncello 68' c Con: Allan (2/2) 52', 69'; Pen: Allan (1/1) 3'

Aviva Stadium, Dublin
Attendance: 43,500
Referee: Mathieu Raynal (France)

Team details

FB	15	Jimmy O'Brien	(substituted off) 40'
RW	14	Keith Earls
OC	13	Robbie Henshaw	(substituted off) 61'
IC	12	Stuart McCloskey
LW	11	Jacob Stockdale
FH	10	Jack Crowley
SH	9	Craig Casey	(substituted off) 44'
N8	8	Jack Conan	(substituted off) 35'
OF	7	Caelan Doris
BF	6	Ryan Baird
RL	5	Joe McCarthy
LL	4	Iain Henderson (c)	(substituted off) 55'
TP	3	Tom O'Toole	(substituted off) 51'
HK	2	Rob Herring	(substituted off) 51'
LP	1	Dave Kilcoyne	(substituted off) 51'
Replacements:
HK	16	Tom Stewart	(substituted on) 51'
PR	17	Cian Healy	(substituted on) 51'
PR	18	Tadhg Furlong	(substituted on) 51'
LK	19	Tadhg Beirne	(substituted on) 55'
FL	20	Cian Prendergast	(substituted on) 35'
SH	21	Caolin Blade	(substituted on) 44'
CE	22	Ciarán Frawley	(substituted on) 40'
WG	23	Calvin Nash	(substituted on) 61'
Coach:
(England) Andy Farrell

FB	15	Tommaso Allan
RW	14	Paolo Odogwu		(substituted off) 22'
OC	13	Ignacio Brex
IC	12	Tommaso Menoncello
LW	11	Monty Ioane
FH	10	Paolo Garbisi
SH	9	Stephen Varney		(substituted off) 40'
N8	8	Toa Halafihi
OF	7	Manuel Zuliani		(substituted off) 40'
BF	6	Sebastian Negri		(substituted off) 73'
RL	5	Federico Ruzza (c)
LL	4	Dino Lamb		(substituted off) 45'
TP	3	Marco Riccioni		(substituted off) 9'
HK	2	Giacomo Nicotera		(substituted off) 55'
LP	1	Danilo Fischetti	(yellow card) 27'				(substituted off) 59'
Replacements:
HK	16	Luca Bigi		(substituted on) 55'
PR	17	Paolo Buonfiglio			(substituted on) 35'	(substituted off) 38'	(substituted on) 59'
PR	18	Simone Ferrari		(substituted on) 9'
LK	19	Niccolò Cannone		(substituted off) 45'
FL	20	Michele Lamaro		(substituted on) 40'
N8	21	Lorenzo Cannone		(substituted on) 73'
SH	22	Alessandro Fusco		(substituted on) 40'
FB	23	Lorenzo Pani		(substituted on) 22'	(substituted off) 35'	(substituted on) 38'
Coach:
(New Zealand) Kieran Crowley

Player of the Match:
Caelan Doris (Ireland)

Assistant referees:
Pierre Brousset (France)
Luc Ramos (France)
Television match official:
Eric Gauzins (France)
Foul play review officer:
Stuart Terheege (England)

Notes:

- Ciarán Frawley, Calvin Nash, Tom Stewart (all Ireland), Paolo Buonfiglio, Dino Lamb and Paolo Odogwu (all Italy) made their international debuts.

5 August 2023
16:10 AST (UTC-3)

Argentina	13–24	South Africa
Try: Bertranou 22' c Con: Boffelli (1/1) 24'; Pen: Boffelli (2/2) 37', 52'	Report	Try: Mapimpi 42' c Moodie 46' m Con: Libbok (1/2) 43'; Pen: Libbok (4/7) 16', 59', 67', 72'

José Amalfitani Stadium, Buenos Aires
Attendance: 60,000
Referee: Nika Amashukeli (Georgia)

Team details

FB	15	Martín Bogado	(substituted off) 62'
RW	14	Emiliano Boffelli
OC	13	Lucio Cinti
IC	12	Santiago Chocobares	(substituted off) 1'
LW	11	Santiago Cordero
FH	10	Santiago Carreras
SH	9	Gonzalo Bertranou	(substituted off) 71'
N8	8	Juan Martín González
OF	7	Santiago Grondona	(substituted off) 52'
BF	6	Pablo Matera
RL	5	Tomás Lavanini
LL	4	Pedro Rubiolo	(substituted off) 33'
TP	3	Francisco Gómez Kodela	(substituted off) 61'
HK	2	Julián Montoya (c)	(substituted off) 72'
LP	1	Thomas Gallo	(substituted off) 62'
Replacements:
HK	16	Agustín Creevy	(substituted on) 72'
PR	17	Joel Sclavi	(substituted on) 62'
PR	18	Eduardo Bello	(substituted on) 61'
LK	19	Guido Petti	(substituted on) 33'
N8	20	Facundo Isa	(substituted on) 52'
SH	21	Lautaro Bazán	(substituted on) 71'
FH	22	Tomás Albornoz	(substituted on) 62'
CE	23	Matías Moroni	(substituted on) 1'
Coach:
(Australia) Michael Cheika

FB	15	Damian Willemse
RW	14	Canan Moodie
OC	13	Lukhanyo Am		(substituted off) 40'
IC	12	André Esterhuizen
LW	11	Makazole Mapimpi
FH	10	Manie Libbok
SH	9	Cobus Reinach		(substituted off) 55'
N8	8	Jasper Wiese		(substituted off) 55'
BF	7	Franco Mostert	(yellow card) 35'
OF	6	Deon Fourie
RL	5	Marvin Orie		(substituted off) 47'
LL	4	Jean Kleyn
TP	3	Thomas du Toit		(substituted off) 51'
HK	2	Bongi Mbonambi (c)		(substituted off) 51'
LP	1	Trevor Nyakane		(substituted off) 43'	(substituted on) 51'	(substituted off) 62'
Replacements:
HK	16	Joseph Dweba		(substituted on) 51'
PR	17	Gerhard Steenekamp		(substituted on) 43'	(substituted off) 51'	(substituted on) 62'
PR	18	Vincent Koch		(substituted on) 40'
LK	19	Jean-Luc du Preez		(substituted on) 47'
FL	20	Evan Roos		(substituted on) 55'
SH	21	Herschel Jantjies		(substituted on) 55'
CE	22	Jesse Kriel		(substituted on) 40'
WG	23	Kurt-Lee Arendse
Coach:
(South Africa) Jacques Nienaber

Assistant referees:
Andrew Brace (Ireland)
Chris Busby (Ireland)
Television match official:
Brian MacNeice (Ireland)
Foul play review officer:
Brett Cronan (Australia)

Notes:

- Martín Bogado (Argentina) and Gerhard Steenekamp (South Africa) made their international debuts.
- Agustín Creevy became the first Argentinean to earn 100 test caps.
- Santiago Cordero (Argentina) earned his 50th test cap.

5 August 2023
18:00 UYT (UTC-03)

Uruguay	26–18	Namibia
Try: Deus (2) 15' c, 28' m Arcos Pérez 48' c D. Ardao 63' c Con: Zuccarino (2/3) 16', 49'; Ormaechea (1/1) 64'	Report	Try: Rossouw 39' m Conradie 42' m Burger 71' m Pen: Swanepoel (1/2) 37'

Estadio Charrúa, Montevideo, Uruguay
Referee: Luke Pearce (England)

Team details

FB	15	Rodrigo Silva
RW	14	Bautista Basso
OC	13	Felipe Arcos Pérez	(yellow card) 37'	(substituted off) 55'
IC	12	Andrés Vilaseca (c)
LW	11	Ignacio Facciolo
FH	10	Juan Andrés Zuccarino		(substituted off) 74'
SH	9	Agustín Ormaechea		(substituted off) 64'
N8	8	Carlos Deus
OF	7	Santiago Civetta
BF	6	Eric Dosantos		(substituted off) 66'
RL	5	Manuel Leindekar		(substituted off) 66'
LL	4	Ignacio Dotti
TP	3	Diego Arbelo		(substituted off) 40'
HK	2	Guillermo Pujadas		(substituted off) 50'
LP	1	Matías Benítez		(substituted off) 50'
Replacements:
HK	16	Germán Kessler		(substituted on) 50'
PR	17	Mateo Sanguinetti		(substituted on) 50'
PR	18	Reinaldo Piussi		(substituted on) 40'
LK	19	Diego Magno		(substituted on) 66'
FL	20	Lucas Bianchi		(substituted on) 66'
SH	21	Juan Manuel Tafernaberry		(substituted on) 64'
FB	22	Ignacio Álvarez		(substituted on) 74'
WG	23	Diego Ardao		(substituted on) 55'
Coach:
(Argentina) Esteban Meneses

FB	15	Divan Rossouw	(yellow card) 28'
RW	14	Gerswin Mouton
OC	13	Johan Deysel (c)
IC	12	Danco Burger
LW	11	JC Greyling
FH	10	Tiaan Swanepoel		(substituted off) 66'
SH	9	Damian Stevens
N8	8	Richard Hardwick		(substituted off) 55'
OF	7	Johan Retief		(substituted off) 72'
BF	6	Wian Conradie
RL	5	Tjiuee Uanivi
LL	4	Adriaan Ludick		(substituted off) 55'
TP	3	Casper Viviers		(substituted off) 66'
HK	2	Louis van der Westhuizen		(substituted off) 71'
LP	1	Des Sethie		(substituted off) 59'
Replacements:
HK	16	Gihard Visagie		(substituted on) 71'
PR	17	Jason Benade		(substituted on) 59'
PR	18	Haitembu Shikufa		(substituted on) 66'
LK	19	Ruan Ludick		(substituted on) 72'
LK	20	P. J. van Lill		(substituted on) 55'
FL	21	Prince ǃGaoseb		(substituted on) 55'
SH	22	Jacques Theron
FH	23	André van den Berg		(substituted on) 66'
Coach:
(South Africa) Allister Coetzee

Assistant referees:
Damian Schneider (Argentina)
Nehuen Jauri Rivero (Argentina)

Notes:

- Ignacio Álvarez, Diego Ardao, Ignacio Facciolo, Juan Manuel Tafernaberry (all Uruguay), Haitembu Shikufa, Tiaan Swanepoel and Gihard Visagie (all Namibia) made their international debuts.

5 August 2023
19:00 CLT (UTC-04)

Chile	13–40	Argentina XV
Try: D. Saavedra 23' c Con: Urroz (1/1) 24'; Pen: Urroz (2/2) 4', 15'	Report	Try: Iriarte 18' c Bosch (2) 32' c, 44' c Oviedo 40' c Cancelliere 52' m Isgró 59' c Con: De la Vega Mendía (5/6) 19', 33', 40', 44', 60'

Estadio Regional de Antofagasta, Antofagasta
Referee: Craig Evans (Wales)

=== 10 August ===
10 August 2023
15:00 TOT (UTC+13)

Tonga	28–3	Canada
Try: Moli 4' c Takulua 19' c Vailanu (2) 40+3' c, 52' c Con: Takulua (4/4) 5', 20', 40+4', 53'	Report	Pen: Nelson (1/1) 11'

Teufaiva Sport Stadium, Nukuʻalofa
Attendance: 6,000
Referee: Jordan Way (Australia)

Team details

FB	15	Afusipa Taumoepeau		(substituted off) 63'
RW	14	Kyren Taumoefolau		(substituted off) 68'
OC	13	Malakai Fekitoa
IC	12	George Moala	(red card) 45'
LW	11	Fine Inisi
FH	10	Patrick Pellegrini
SH	9	Sonatane Takulua (c)
N8	8	Sione Vailanu		(substituted off) 54'
OF	7	Sione Havili Talitui
BF	6	Solomone Funaki	(yellow card) 32'
RL	5	Tanginoa Halaifonua
LL	4	Steve Mafi		(substituted off) 68'
TP	3	David Lolohea		(substituted off) 40'
HK	2	Sam Moli		(substituted off) 43'
LP	1	Tau Koloamatangi		(substituted off) 43'
Replacements:
HK	16	Paul Ngauamo		(substituted on) 43'
PR	17	Feao Fotuaika		(substituted on) 43'
PR	18	Ben Tameifuna		(substituted on) 40'
LK	19	Vaea Fifita		(substituted on) 68'
FL	20	Lopeti Timani		(substituted on) 54'
SH	21	John Ika
FH	22	Otumaka Mausia		(substituted on) 68'
WG	23	Solomone Kata		(substituted on) 63'
Coach:
(Australia) Toutai Kefu

FB	15	Peter Nelson
RW	14	Kainoa Lloyd
OC	13	Ben LeSage	(substituted off) 48'
IC	12	Spencer Jones
LW	11	Isaac Olson
FH	10	Robbie Povey
SH	9	Ross Braude	(substituted off) 74'
N8	8	Siaki Vikilani	(substituted off) 68'
OF	7	Lucas Rumball (c)	(substituted off) 72'
BF	6	Mason Flesch	(substituted off) 52'
RL	5	Conor Keys
LL	4	Izzak Kelly
TP	3	Conor Young	(substituted off) 40'
HK	2	Andrew Quattrin	(substituted off) 64'
LP	1	Liam Murray	(substituted off) 40'
Replacements:
HK	16	Foster DeWitt	(substituted on) 64'
PR	17	Djustice Sears-Duru	(substituted on) 40'
PR	18	Cole Keith	(substituted on) 40'
LK	19	Piers von Dadelszen	(substituted on) 52'
FL	20	Siôn Parry	(substituted on) 72'
FL	21	Travis Larsen	(substituted on) 68'
SH	22	Jason Higgins	(substituted on) 74'
CE	23	Mitch Richardson	(substituted on) 48'
Coach:
(Wales) Kingsley Jones

Assistant referees:
James Doleman (New Zealand)
Tevita Rokovereni (Fiji)

Notes:

- Izzak Kelly, Siôn Parry, Travis Larsen and Mitch Richardson (all Canada) made their international debuts.

=== 12 August ===
12 August 2023
19:00 GET (UTC+04)

Georgia	56–6	Romania
Try: Aprasidze 3' c Sharikadze 36' c Chkoidze 39' m Gachechiladze 41' c Tabutsadze 45' c Matkava 48' m Mamukashvili 66' m Lobzhanidze 78' c Con: Matkava (5/8) 4', 37', 42', 46', 79'; Pen: Matkava (1/1) 12'; Aprasidze (1/1) 20'		Pen: Melinte (2/2) 1', 24'

Mikheil Meskhi Stadium, Tbilisi
Attendance: 10,000
Referee: Wayne Barnes (England)

Team details

FB	15	Mirian Modebadze
RW	14	Aka Tabutsadze
OC	13	Demur Tapladze
IC	12	Merab Sharikadze (c)		(substituted off) 50'
LW	11	Otar Lashkhi	(yellow card) 53'	(substituted off) 64'
FH	10	Luka Matkava
SH	9	Gela Aprasidze		(substituted off) 50'
N8	8	Luka Ivanishvili
OF	7	Mikheil Gachechiladze
BF	6	Otar Giorgadze		(substituted off) 58'
RL	5	Lado Chachanidze		(substituted off) 58'
LL	4	Nodar Cheishvili
TP	3	Luka Japaridze		(substituted off) 46'
HK	2	Giorgi Chkoidze		(substituted off) 46'
LP	1	Mikheil Nariashvili		(substituted off) 46'
Replacements:
HK	16	Shalva Mamukashvili		(substituted on) 46'
PR	17	Nika Abuladze		(substituted on) 46'
PR	18	Guram Papidze		(substituted on) 46'
LK	19	Lasha Jaiani		(substituted on) 58'
FL	20	Giorgi Tsutskiridze		(substituted on) 58'
SH	21	Vasil Lobzhanidze		(substituted on) 50'
FH	22	Lasha Khmaladze		(substituted on) 64'
CE	23	Giorgi Kveseladze		(substituted on) 50'
Coach:
(Georgia (country)) Levan Maisashvili

FB	15	Ionel Melinte	(substituted off) 40'
RW	14	Nicolas Onuțu
OC	13	Fonovai Tangimana
IC	12	Taylor Gontineac
LW	11	Sioeli Lama	(substituted off) 40'
FH	10	Vlăduț Popa	(substituted off) 56'
SH	9	Gabriel Rupanu
N8	8	Andre Gorin
OF	7	Dragoș Ser	(substituted off) 53'	(substituted on) 74'
BF	6	Florian Roșu		(substituted off) 74'
RL	5	Stefan Iancu
LL	4	Adrian Motoc (c)	(substituted off) 61'
TP	3	Costel Burtila	(substituted off) 40'
HK	2	Tudor Butnariu	(substituted off) 61'
LP	1	Vasile Balan	(substituted off) 51'
Replacements:
HK	16	Robert Irimescu	(substituted on) 61'
PR	17	Iulian Hartig	(substituted on) 40'
PR	18	Thomas Crețu	(substituted on) 51'
LK	19	Andrei Mahu	(substituted on) 61'
N8	20	Damian Strătilă	(substituted on) 53'
SH	21	Vlăduț Bocăneț	(substituted on) 56'
FH	22	Tudor Boldor	(substituted on) 40'
FB	23	Paul Popoaia	(substituted on) 40'
Coach:
(Romania) Eugen Apjok

Assistant referees:
Christophe Ridley (England)
Federico Vedovelli (Italy)
Television match official:
Eric Gauzins (France)

Notes:

- This was Georgia's biggest win over Romania, surpassing the 29-point difference set when they won 38–9 in 2016.
- This was Romania's largest defeat to any Tier 2 nation, previously 37–0 to the United States set in 1924.

12 August 2023
17:30 BST (UTC+01)

England	19–17	Wales
Try: Itoje 67' c Con: Ford (1/1) 68'; Pen: Farrell (3/3) 9', 40+2', 41'; Ford (1/1) 75'	Report	Try: Penalty try 59'; T. Williams 64' c Con: Biggar (1/1) 65'; Pen: O. Williams (1/1) 45'

Twickenham Stadium, London
Attendance: 74,256
Referee: Nika Amashukeli (Georgia)

Team details

FB	15	Freddie Steward	(yellow card) 58'
RW	14	Henry Arundell	(yellow card) 31'	(substituted off) 56'
OC	13	Joe Marchant
IC	12	Ollie Lawrence		(substituted off) 71'
LW	11	Elliot Daly
FH	10	Owen Farrell (c)	(red card) 62'
SH	9	Jack van Poortvliet		(substituted off) 31'
N8	8	Billy Vunipola		(substituted off) 61'
OF	7	Ben Earl
BF	6	Courtney Lawes
RL	5	George Martin
LL	4	Maro Itoje
TP	3	Will Stuart		(substituted off) 56'
HK	2	Jamie George
LP	1	Joe Marler		(substituted off) 53'
Replacements:
HK	16	Theo Dan
PR	17	Ellis Genge	(yellow card) 57'	(substituted on) 53'
PR	18	Dan Cole		(substituted on) 56'
LK	19	Jonny Hill
FL	20	Jack Willis		(substituted on) 61'
SH	21	Ben Youngs		(substituted on) 31'
FH	22	George Ford		(substituted on) 56'
WG	23	Max Malins		(substituted on) 71'
Coach:
(England) Steve Borthwick

FB	15	Liam Williams
RW	14	Josh Adams
OC	13	Joe Roberts
IC	12	Nick Tompkins		(substituted off) 59'
LW	11	Tom Rogers
FH	10	Owen Williams		(substituted off) 49'
SH	9	Tomos Williams		(substituted off) 71'
N8	8	Taine Plumtree		(substituted off) 47'
OF	7	Tommy Reffell	(yellow card) 41'
BF	6	Dan Lydiate
RL	5	Adam Beard	(yellow card) 73'
LL	4	Rhys Davies		(substituted off) 49'	(substituted on) 63'
TP	3	Tomas Francis		(substituted off) 49'
HK	2	Dewi Lake (c)		(substituted off) 26'
LP	1	Gareth Thomas		(substituted off) 49'
Replacements:
HK	16	Sam Parry		(substituted on) 26'
PR	17	Kemsley Mathias		(substituted on) 49'
PR	18	Dillon Lewis		(substituted on) 49'
LK	19	Christ Tshiunza		(substituted on) 49'
FL	20	Taine Basham		(substituted on) 47'	(substituted off) 63'
SH	21	Gareth Davies		(substituted on) 71'
FH	22	Dan Biggar		(substituted on) 49'
CE	23	Keiran Williams		(substituted on) 59'
Coach:
(New Zealand) Warren Gatland

Player of the Match:
Ben Earl (England)

Assistant referees:
Andrew Brace (Ireland)
Andrea Piardi (Italy)
Television match official:
Brian MacNeice (Ireland)
Foul play review officer:
Marius van der Westhuizen (South Africa)

Notes:

- Kemsley Mathias, Joe Roberts and Keiran Williams (all Wales) made their international debuts.
- Ellis Genge (England) and Josh Adams (Wales) earned their 50th test caps.

12 August 2023
21:05 CEST (UTC+02)

France	30–27	Scotland
Try: Ntamack 32' c Penaud 42' c Ollivon 44' c Con: Ramos (3/3) 33', 43', 46'; Pen: Ramos (3/3) 8', 22', 79'	Report	Try: Steyn (2) 4' c, 74' m Van der Merwe 62' m Darge 67' c Con: Russell (2/4) 6', 68'; Pen: Russell (1/1) 11'

Stade Geoffroy-Guichard, Saint-Etienne
Attendance: 41,101
Referee: Nic Berry (Australia)

Team details

FB	15	Thomas Ramos
RW	14	Damian Penaud
OC	13	Gaël Fickou
IC	12	Jonathan Danty	(substituted off) 63'
LW	11	Gabin Villière
FH	10	Romain Ntamack	(substituted off) 55'
SH	9	Antoine Dupont (c)	(substituted off) 68'
N8	8	Grégory Alldritt	(substituted off) 66'
OF	7	Charles Ollivon
BF	6	Paul Boudehent
RL	5	Thibaud Flament	(substituted off) 63'
LL	4	Cameron Woki
TP	3	Dorian Aldegheri	(substituted off) 49'
HK	2	Julien Marchand	(substituted off) 49'
LP	1	Cyril Baille	(substituted off) 48'
Replacements:
HK	16	Pierre Bourgarit	(substituted on) 49'
PR	17	Jean-Baptiste Gros	(substituted on) 48'
PR	18	Uini Atonio	(substituted on) 49'
LK	19	Florian Verhaeghe	(substituted on) 66'
LK	20	Bastien Chalureau	(substituted on) 63'
FL	21	Sekou Macalou	(substituted on) 63'
SH	22	Maxime Lucu	(substituted on) 68'
WG	23	Louis Bielle-Biarrey	(substituted on) 55'
Coach:
(France) Fabien Galthié

FB	15	Blair Kinghorn
RW	14	Kyle Steyn
OC	13	Huw Jones
IC	12	Sione Tuipulotu
LW	11	Duhan van der Merwe		(substituted off) 63'
FH	10	Finn Russell
SH	9	Ali Price	(yellow card) 27'	(substituted off) 55'
N8	8	Jack Dempsey		(substituted off) 74'
OF	7	Rory Darge
BF	6	Jamie Ritchie (c)
RL	5	Grant Gilchrist		(substituted off) 55'
LL	4	Richie Gray		(substituted off) 64'
TP	3	WP Nel		(substituted off) 55'
HK	2	George Turner		(substituted off) 55'
LP	1	Pierre Schoeman		(substituted off) 55'
Replacements:
HK	16	Stuart McInally		(substituted on) 55'
PR	17	Rory Sutherland		(substituted on) 55'
PR	18	Javan Sebastian		(substituted on) 55'
LK	19	Scott Cummings		(substituted on) 64'
LK	20	Sam Skinner		(substituted on) 55'
FL	21	Josh Bayliss		(substituted on) 74'
SH	22	George Horne		(substituted on) 55'
FB	23	Ollie Smith		(substituted on) 63'
Coach:
(Scotland) Gregor Townsend

Player of the Match:
Kyle Steyn (Scotland)

Assistant referees:
Karl Dickson (England)
Adam Leal (England)
Television match official:
Tom Foley (England)
Foul play review officer:
Ben Whitehouse (Wales)

12 August 2023
21:00 WEST (UTC+01)

Portugal	46–20	United States
Try: Moura 15' c Marta (2) 30' m, 64' m Appleton 35' c V. Pinto 50' c Penalty try 69'; Martins 78' m Con: Marques (2/4) 16', 36'; Sousa Guedes (1/2) 51'; Pen: Marques (1/1) 40'	Report	Try: Dolan 22' c Penalty try 43'; Con: Carty (1/1) 23'; Pen: Carty (2/2) 10', 29'

Estádio Algarve, São João da Venda
Referee: Paul Williams (New Zealand)

Team details

FB	15	Nuno Sousa Guedes
RW	14	Vincent Pinto		(substituted off) 69'
OC	13	José Lima
IC	12	Tomás Appleton (c)
LW	11	Rodrigo Marta
FH	10	Joris Moura		(substituted off) 54'
SH	9	Samuel Marques	(yellow card) 43'	(substituted off) 73'
N8	8	Thibault de Freitas		(substituted off) 14'
OF	7	Nicolas Martins
BF	6	João Granate	(yellow card) 28'
RL	5	Steevy Cerqueira		(substituted off) 23'
LL	4	José Madeira
TP	3	Anthony Alves		(substituted off) 59'
HK	2	Mike Tadjer		(substituted off) 56'
LP	1	Francisco Fernandes		(substituted off) 58'
Replacements:
PR	16	David Costa		(substituted on) 58'
HK	17	Lionel Campergue		(substituted on) 56'
PR	18	Diogo Hasse Ferreira		(substituted on) 59'
FL	19	Rafael Simões		(substituted on) 14'
FL	20	David Carvalho		(substituted on) 23'
SH	21	Pedro Lucas		(substituted on) 73'
FH	22	Jerónimo Portela		(substituted on) 54'
FB	23	Manuel Cardoso Pinto		(substituted on) 69'
Coach:
(France) Patrice Lagisquet

FB	15	Mitch Wilson		(substituted off) 59'
RW	14	Christian Dyer
OC	13	Mika Kruse		(substituted off) 58'
IC	12	Tavite Lopeti
LW	11	Nate Augspurger
FH	10	Luke Carty
SH	9	Nick McCarthy		(substituted off) 62'
N8	8	Luke White		(substituted off) 62'
OF	7	Paddy Ryan
BF	6	Sam Golla
RL	5	Greg Peterson (c)
LL	4	Cam Dolan		(substituted off) 77'
TP	3	Kaleb Geiger		(substituted off) 40'
HK	2	Dylan Fawsitt		(substituted off) 72'
LP	1	Jack Iscaro		(substituted off) 67'
Replacements:
HK	16	Peter Malcolm		(substituted on) 72'
PR	17	Jake Turnbull		(substituted on) 67'
PR	18	Paul Mullen		(substituted on) 40'
FL	19	Thomas Tu’avao		(substituted on) 62'
N9	20	Vili Helu		(substituted on) 77'
SH	21	Ruben de Haas		(substituted on) 62'
FB	22	Chris Mattina	(yellow card) 69'	(substituted on) 59'
WG	23	Lauina Futi		(substituted on) 58'
Coach:
(United States) Scott Lawrence

Assistant referees:
Mike Adamson (Scotland)
Hollie Davidson (Scotland)
Television match official:
Thomas Charabas (France)

Notes:

- Joris Moura (Portugal), Lauina Futi and Kaleb Geiger (both United States) made their international debuts.

12 August 2023
17:00 CLT (UTC-04)

Chile	26–28	Namibia
Try: Fernández 14' c Ayarza 17' c Sigren 39' m D. Saavedra 57' c Con: Videla (3/4) 15', 18', 58'	Report	Try: Greyling 20' c Rossouw 59' c Van der Westhuizen 64' c A. Ludick 68' c Con: Swanepoel (4/4) 20', 60', 65', 69'

Estadio Elías Figueroa, Valparaíso
Referee: Craig Evans (Wales)

Team details

FB	15	Iñaki Ayarza		(substituted off) 67'
RW	14	Santiago Videla
OC	13	Matías Garafulic		(substituted off) 40'
IC	12	Domingo Saavedra
LW	11	Nicolás Garafulic
FH	10	Rodrigo Fernández
SH	9	Marcelo Torrealba		(substituted off) 74'
N8	8	Alfonso Escobar
OF	7	Clemente Saavedra
BF	6	Martín Sigren (c)
RL	5	Javier Eissmann		(substituted off) 65'
LL	4	Pablo Huete		(substituted off) 67'
TP	3	Matías Dittus		(substituted off) 75'
HK	2	Augusto Böhme		(substituted off) 52'
LP	1	Salvador Lues		(substituted off) 52'
Replacements:
HK	16	Tomás Dussaillant		(substituted on) 52'
PR	17	Javier Carrasco		(substituted on) 52'
PR	18	Esteban Inostroza		(substituted on) 75'
LK	19	Santiago Pedrero		(substituted on) 65'
FL	20	Ignacio Silva		(substituted on) 67'
SH	21	Lukas Carvallo		(substituted on) 74'
WG	22	José Larenas	(yellow card) 70'	(substituted on) 40'
FB	23	Francisco Urroz		(substituted on) 67'
Coach:
(Uruguay) Pablo Lemoine

FB	15	Divan Rossouw
RW	14	Chad Plato
OC	13	Johan Deysel (c)
IC	12	Danco Burger	(substituted off) 74'
LW	11	JC Greyling
FH	10	Tiaan Swanepoel
SH	9	Damian Stevens
N8	8	Richard Hardwick
OF	7	Max Katjijeko	(substituted off) 40'
BF	6	Wian Conradie
RL	5	Ruan Ludick	(substituted off) 40'
LL	4	Adriaan Ludick
TP	3	Aranos Coetzee	(substituted off) 50'
HK	2	Louis van der Westhuizen
LP	1	Des Sethie	(substituted off) 50'
Replacements:
HK	16	Lodewikus Jacobs
PR	17	Jason Benade	(substituted on) 50'
PR	18	Casper Viviers	(substituted on) 50'
LK	19	Tiaan de Klerk	(substituted on) 40'
LK	20	Johan Retief	(substituted on) 40'	(substituted off) 50'
FL	21	Prince ǃGaoseb		(substituted on) 50'
SH	22	Jacques Theron
FH	23	André van den Berg	(substituted on) 74'
Coach:
(South Africa) Allister Coetzee

Assistant referees:
Francisco Gonzalez (Uruguay)
Matias Esteban (Uruguay)

Notes:

- Esteban Inostroza (Chile) and Tiaan de Klerk (Namibia) made their international debuts.
- This was the first meeting between these nations.

=== 15 August ===
15 August 2023
15:00 TOT (UTC+13)

Tonga	36–12	Canada
Try: Sakalia (2) 4' c, 32' c K. Taumoefolau (2) 18' m, 46' m V. Fifita 24' c Moli 73' m Con: Takulua (3/5) 5', 25', 33'	Report	Try: Olson (2) 65' m, 78' c Con: Nelson (1/2) 79'

Teufaiva Sport Stadium, Nukuʻalofa
Attendance: 4,000
Referee: James Doleman (New Zealand)

Team details

FB	15	Otumaka Mausia
RW	14	Kyren Taumoefolau
OC	13	Fine Inisi
IC	12	Pita Ahki	(substituted off) 71'
LW	11	John Ika
FH	10	William Havili	(substituted off) 61'
SH	9	Sonatane Takulua (c)	(substituted off) 61'
N8	8	Solomone Funaki
OF	7	Sione Tupou	(substituted off) 66'
BF	6	Sam Moli
RL	5	Vaea Fifita
LL	4	Steve Mafi	(substituted off) 66'
TP	3	Ben Tameifuna	(substituted off) 40'
HK	2	Sosefo Sakalia	(substituted off) 52'
LP	1	Siegfried Fisi'ihoi	(substituted off) 40'
Replacements:
HK	16	Paul Ngauamo	(substituted on) 52'
PR	17	Feao Fotuaika	(substituted on) 40'
PR	18	Paula Latu	(substituted on) 40'
LK	19	Vutulongo Puloka	(substituted on) 66'
FL	20	Christopher Halaʻufia	(substituted on) 66'
SH	21	Feleti Inoke	(substituted on) 71'
FH	22	Patrick Pellegrini	(substituted on) 61'
WG	23	Tasi Feke	(substituted on) 61'
Coach:
(Australia) Toutai Kefu

FB	15	Peter Nelson
RW	14	Kainoa Lloyd
OC	13	Mitch Richardson
IC	12	Spencer Jones	(substituted off) 66'
LW	11	Isaac Olson
FH	10	Robbie Povey
SH	9	Jason Higgins	(substituted off) 61'
N8	8	Siaki Vikilani	(substituted off) 66'
OF	7	Siôn Parry	(substituted off) 73'
BF	6	Lucas Rumball (c)
RL	5	Conor Keys
LL	4	Izzak Kelly	(substituted off) 70'
TP	3	Conor Young	(substituted off) 38'
HK	2	Andrew Quattrin	(substituted off) 66'
LP	1	Liam Murray	(substituted off) 37'
Replacements:
HK	16	Foster DeWitt	(substituted on) 66'
PR	17	Djustice Sears-Duru	(substituted on) 37'
PR	18	Cole Keith	(substituted on) 38'
LK	19	Piers von Dadelszen	(substituted on) 70'
FL	20	Mason Flesch	(substituted on) 73'
FL	21	Travis Larsen	(substituted on) 66'
SH	22	Ross Braude	(substituted on) 61'
CE	23	Gabe Casey	(substituted on) 66'
Coach:
(Wales) Kingsley Jones

Assistant referees:
Jordan Way (Australia)
Tevita Rokovereni (Fiji)

Notes:

- Tasi Feke, Christopher Halaʻufia, John Ika, Paula Latu, Vutulongo Puloka, Sione Tupou (all Tonga) and Gabe Casey (Canada) made their international debuts.

=== 18/19 August ===
18 August 2023
20:45 CEST (UTC+02)

Samoa	28–14	Barbarians
Try: Lee 21' m Manu 48' c Enari 55' c Con: Sopoaga (2/3) 49', 56'; Pen: Sopoaga (2/2) 4', 40'; Leali'ifano (1/2) 59'		Try: Du Preez 63' c Speight 76' c Con: Williams (2/2) 64', 77'

Stade Amédée-Domenech, Brive-la-Gaillarde
Referee: Mike Adamson (Scotland)

Team details

FB	15	Danny Toala	(substituted off) 38'	(substituted on) 40'
RW	14	Nigel Ah Wong			(substituted off) 46'
OC	13	Neria Fomai
IC	12	Tumua Manu
LW	11	Ben Lam
FH	10	Lima Sopoaga	(substituted off) 57'
SH	9	Melani Matavao	(substituted off) 46'
N8	8	So'otala Fa'aso'o
OF	7	Fritz Lee	(substituted off) 71'
BF	6	Steve Luatua
RL	5	Theo McFarland
LL	4	Brian Alainu'uese	(substituted off) 46'
TP	3	Michael Alaalatoa (c)	(substituted off) 46'
HK	2	Seilala Lam	(substituted off) 46'
LP	1	Jordan Lay	(substituted off) 40'
Replacements:
HK	16	Luteru Tolai	(substituted on) 46'
PR	17	James Lay	(substituted on) 40'
PR	18	Paul Alo-Emile	(substituted on) 46'
LK	19	Chris Vui	(substituted on) 46'
FL	20	Jordan Taufua	(substituted on) 71'
SH	21	Ere Enari	(substituted on) 46'
FH	22	Christian Leali'ifano	(substituted on) 57'
WG	23	Ed Fidow	(substituted on) 38'	(substituted off) 40'	(substituted on) 46'
Coach:
(Samoa) Seilala Mapusua

FB	15	(Samoa) Tim Nanai-Williams	(substituted off) 60'
RW	14	(Wales) Toby Fricker
OC	13	(France) Virimi Vakatawa	(substituted off) 54'
IC	12	(Australia) Curtis Rona
LW	11	(Australia) Henry Speight
FH	10	(Ireland) Antoine Frisch
SH	9	(South Africa) Herschel Jantjies	(substituted off) 62'
N8	8	(England) Mitch Eadie	(substituted off) 62'
OF	7	(Samoa) Jack Lam	(substituted off) 44'
BF	6	(Scotland) Dylan Richardson
RL	5	(South Africa) Reniel Hugo
LL	4	(South Africa) Jean-Luc du Preez (c)
TP	3	(Samoa) Jeffery Toomaga-Allen	(substituted off) 54'
HK	2	(South Africa) Joseph Dweba	(substituted off) 68'
LP	1	(Samoa) Aki Seiuli	(substituted off) 51'
Replacements:
HK	16	(South Africa) Andre-Hugo Venter	(substituted on) 68'
PR	17	(Wales) Rob Evans	(substituted on) 51'
PR	18	(Scotland) Steven Longwell	(substituted on) 54'
LK	19	(Samoa) Joe Tekori	(substituted on) 62'
FL	20	(Japan) Yusuke Sakamoto	(substituted on) 44'
SH	21	(England) Max Green	(substituted on) 68'
CE	22	(England) James Williams	(substituted on) 54'
WG	23	(Scotland) Damien Hoyland	(substituted on) 60'
Coach:
(Samoa) Pat Lam

Player of the Match:
Tumua Manu (Samoa)

Assistant referees:
FFR Appt. (France)
FFR Appt. (France)

18 August 2023
20:00 UYT (UTC-03)

Uruguay	33–13	Argentina XV
Try: Kessler (2) 1' m, 17' c Ardao 54' c Bianchi 57' c Berchesi 80' c Con: Etcheverry (3/4) 18', 54' 58'; Berchesi (1/1) 80'	Report	Try: Delguy 65' c Con: De la Vega Mendía (1/1) 66'; Pen: De la Vega Mendía (2/2) 3', 11'

Estadio Charrúa, Montevideo, Uruguay
Referee: Frank Murphy (Ireland)

19 August 2023
15:15 BST (UTC+01)

Wales	16–52	South Africa
Try: Parry 71' c Con: Evans (1/1) 72'; Pen: Costelow (3/3) 8', 20', 24'	Report	Try: Marx 3' m Moodie (2) 21' c, 60' c Penalty try 33'; Kriel (2) 34' m, 51' c Du Toit 58' c Willemse 68' c Con: Libbok (5/7) 23', 52', 59', 61', 69'

Millennium Stadium, Cardiff
Attendance: 68,511
Referee: Andrew Brace (Ireland)

Team details

FB	15	Cai Evans		(substituted off) 61'	(substituted on) 66'
RW	14	Tom Rogers
OC	13	Mason Grady		(substituted off) 53'	(substituted on) 71'
IC	12	Johnny Williams
LW	11	Rio Dyer			(substituted off) 71'
FH	10	Sam Costelow			(substituted off) 66'
SH	9	Kieran Hardy		(substituted off) 53'
N8	8	Aaron Wainwright		(substituted off) 55'
OF	7	Jac Morgan (c)
BF	6	Dan Lydiate
RL	5	Will Rowlands
LL	4	Ben Carter		(substituted off) 61'
TP	3	Kieron Assiratti		(substituted off) 49'
HK	2	Elliot Dee		(substituted off) 56'
LP	1	Corey Domachowski		(substituted off) 49'
Replacements:
HK	16	Sam Parry		(substituted on) 56'
PR	17	Nicky Smith		(substituted on) 49'
PR	18	Henry Thomas		(substituted on) 49'
LK	19	Teddy Williams	(yellow card) 67'	(substituted on) 61'
FL	20	Taine Basham		(substituted on) 55'
SH	21	Tomos Williams		(substituted on) 53'
CE	22	Max Llewellyn		(substituted on) 53'
WG	23	Louis Rees-Zammit		(substituted on) 61'
Coach:
(New Zealand) Warren Gatland

FB	15	Willie le Roux		(substituted off) 55'
RW	14	Canan Moodie
OC	13	Jesse Kriel
IC	12	Damian de Allende
LW	11	Cheslin Kolbe
FH	10	Manie Libbok
SH	9	Jaden Hendrikse		(substituted off) 62'
N8	8	Jasper Wiese		(substituted off) 50'
BF	7	Pieter-Steph du Toit
OF	6	Siya Kolisi		(substituted off) 41'
RL	5	RG Snyman
LL	4	Jean Kleyn		(substituted off) 50'
TP	3	Frans Malherbe		(substituted off) 47'
HK	2	Malcolm Marx		(substituted off) 47'
LP	1	Steven Kitshoff		(substituted off) 47'
Replacements:
HK	16	Bongi Mbonambi		(substituted on) 47'
PR	17	Ox Nché		(substituted on) 47'
PR	18	Vincent Koch		(substituted on) 47'
LK	19	Franco Mostert		(substituted on) 50'
FL	20	Marco van Staden		(substituted on) 41'
N8	21	Duane Vermeulen		(substituted on) 50'
SH	22	Grant Williams		(substituted on) 62'
FB	23	Damian Willemse	(yellow card) 70'	(substituted on) 55'
Coach:
(South Africa) Jacques Nienaber

Player of the Match:
Canan Moodie (South Africa)

Assistant referees:
Chris Busby (Ireland)
Eoghan Cross (Ireland)
Television match official:
Joy Neville (Ireland)
Foul play review officer:
Tom Foley (England)

Notes:

- Cai Evans and Teddy Williams (Wales) made their international debuts.
- Dan Biggar, Alex Cuthbert and Liam Williams were all originally named to start for Wales, but each withdrew prior to the match due to injury. Their places in the starting line-up were taken by Sam Costelow, Cai Evans and Tom Rogers, the latter of whom was replaced on the bench by Louis Rees-Zammit.

19 August 2023
19:00 GET (UTC+04)

Georgia	22–7	United States
Try: Tabutsadze 11' m Mamukashvili 28' c Niniashvili 46' c Con: Matkava (2/3) 29', 47'; Pen: Matkava (1/1) 60'		Try: De Haas 32' c Con: Carty (1/1) 33'

Mikheil Meskhi Stadium, Tbilisi
Attendance: 15,000
Referee: Jaco Peyper (South Africa)

Team details

FB	15	Davit Niniashvili		(substituted off) 69'
RW	14	Aka Tabutsadze
OC	13	Giorgi Kveseladze
IC	12	Merab Sharikadze (c)
LW	11	Alexander Todua	(yellow card) 40'	(substituted off) 62'
FH	10	Luka Matkava
SH	9	Vasil Lobzhanidze		(substituted off) 60'
N8	8	Tornike Jalaghonia
OF	7	Giorgi Tsutskiridze
BF	6	Luka Ivanishvili		(substituted off) 66'
RL	5	Konstantin Mikautadze		(substituted off) 60'
LL	4	Nodar Cheishvili
TP	3	Beka Gigashvili		(substituted off) 55'
HK	2	Shalva Mamukashvili		(substituted off) 55'
LP	1	Nika Abuladze		(substituted off) 51'
Replacements:
HK	16	Tengiz Zamtaradze		(substituted on) 55'
PR	17	Guram Gogichashvili		(substituted on) 51'
PR	18	Guram Papidze		(substituted on) 55'
LK	19	Lado Chachanidze		(substituted on) 60'
FL	20	Otar Giorgadze		(substituted on) 66'
SH	21	Gela Aprasidze		(substituted on) 60'
CE	22	Demur Tapladze		(substituted on) 62'
FB	23	Mirian Modebadze		(substituted on) 69'
Coach:
(Georgia (country)) Levan Maisashvili

FB	15	Chris Mattina
RW	14	Christian Dyer		(substituted off) 73'
OC	13	Tavite Lopeti
IC	12	Tommaso Boni
LW	11	Nate Augspurger	(yellow card) 77'
FH	10	Luke Carty
SH	9	Ruben de Haas		(substituted off) 47'
N8	8	Thomas Tu’avao
OF	7	Paddy Ryan
BF	6	Cam Dolan
RL	5	Greg Peterson (c)		(substituted off) 68'
LL	4	Sam Golla
TP	3	Kaleb Geiger		(substituted off) 40'
HK	2	Dylan Fawsitt		(substituted off) 66'
LP	1	Jack Iscaro		(substituted off) 66'
Replacements:
HK	16	Peter Malcolm		(substituted on) 66'
PR	17	Jake Turnbull		(substituted on) 66'
PR	18	Paul Mullen		(substituted on) 40'
LK	19	Nate Brakeley		(substituted on) 68'
N8	20	Luke White
SH	21	Nick McCarthy		(substituted on) 47'
FH	22	Dominic Besag		(substituted on) 35'
WG	23	Lauina Futi		(substituted on) 73'
Coach:
(United States) Scott Lawrence

Assistant referees:
Sam Grove-White (Scotland)
Luc Ramos (France)
Television match official:
Thomas Charabas (France)

19 August 2023
17:30 IST (UTC+01)

Ireland	29–10	England
Try: Aki 9' c Ringrose 39' m Lowe 57' m Hansen 62' m Earls 73' c Con: Byrne (1/4) 10'; Crowley (1/1) 74'	Report	Try: Sinckler 71' c Con: Ford (1/1) 72'; Pen: Ford (1/2) 5'

Aviva Stadium, Dublin
Attendance: 51,000
Referee: Paul Williams (New Zealand)

Team details

FB	15	Hugo Keenan
RW	14	Mack Hansen
OC	13	Garry Ringrose
IC	12	Bundee Aki	(substituted off) 58'	(substituted on) 69'
LW	11	James Lowe	(substituted off) 58'
FH	10	Ross Byrne		(substituted off) 69'
SH	9	Jamison Gibson-Park	(substituted off) 66'
N8	8	Cian Prendergast
OF	7	Josh van der Flier
BF	6	Peter O'Mahony	(substituted off) 52'
RL	5	James Ryan (c)	(substituted off) 69'
LL	4	Tadhg Beirne
TP	3	Tadhg Furlong	(substituted off) 56'
HK	2	Dan Sheehan	(substituted off) 37'
LP	1	Andrew Porter	(substituted off) 70'
Replacements:
HK	16	Rob Herring	(substituted on) 37'
PR	17	Jeremy Loughman	(substituted on) 70'
PR	18	Finlay Bealham	(substituted on) 56'
LK	19	Joe McCarthy	(substituted on) 52'
FL	20	Caelan Doris	(substituted on) 69'
SH	21	Conor Murray	(substituted on) 66'
FH	22	Jack Crowley	(substituted on) 58'
WG	23	Keith Earls	(substituted on) 58'
Coach:
(England) Andy Farrell

FB	15	Freddie Steward
RW	14	Anthony Watson		(substituted off) 69'
OC	13	Joe Marchant
IC	12	Manu Tuilagi		(substituted off) 60'
LW	11	Elliot Daly
FH	10	George Ford
SH	9	Ben Youngs		(substituted off) 56'
N8	8	Billy Vunipola	(red card) 52'
OF	7	Ben Earl
BF	6	Courtney Lawes (c)		(substituted off) 75'
RL	5	David Ribbans		(substituted off) 50'
LL	4	Maro Itoje
TP	3	Will Stuart		(substituted off) 44'
HK	2	Jamie George		(substituted off) 66'
LP	1	Ellis Genge		(substituted off) 56'
Replacements:
HK	16	Theo Dan		(substituted on) 66'
PR	17	Joe Marler		(substituted on) 56'
PR	18	Kyle Sinckler		(substituted on) 44'
LK	19	Ollie Chessum		(substituted on) 50'
FL	20	Jack Willis		(substituted on) 75'
SH	21	Danny Care		(substituted on) 56'
FH	22	Marcus Smith		(substituted on) 69'
CE	23	Ollie Lawrence		(substituted on) 60'
Coach:
(England) Steve Borthwick

Player of the Match:
Mack Hansen (Ireland)

Assistant referees:
Craig Evans (Wales)
Adam Jones (Wales)
Television match official:
Ben Whitehouse (Wales)
Foul play review officer:
Pierre Brousset (France)

Notes:

- Keith Earls became the ninth Irishman to earn 100 test caps for his country.

19 August 2023
18:30 CEST (UTC+02)

Italy	57–7	Romania
Try: Odogwu 7' m Ioane 12' c A. Garbisi 16' c Capuozzo (2) 20' m, 54' m Nicotera 27' c Brex 44' c Lamb 66' c Halafihi 72' c Con: P. Garbisi (6/9) 13', 17', 28', 44', 66', 73'	Report	Try: Penalty try 39' c

Stadio Riviera delle Palme, San Benedetto del Tronto
Attendance: 9,122
Referee: Luke Pearce (England)

Team details

FB	15	Ange Capuozzo		(substituted off) 71'
RW	14	Paolo Odogwu		(substituted off) 60'
OC	13	Ignacio Brex
IC	12	Luca Morisi		(substituted off) 57'
LW	11	Monty Ioane		(substituted off) 49' (substituted on) 62'
FH	10	Paolo Garbisi
SH	9	Alessandro Garbisi		(substituted off) 62'
N8	8	Toa Halafihi
OF	7	Michele Lamaro (c)	(yellow card) 39'	(substituted off) 14'	(substituted on) 23'
BF	6	Sebastian Negri				(substituted off) 60'
RL	5	Dino Lamb
LL	4	Niccolò Cannone
TP	3	Simone Ferrari		(substituted off) 57'
HK	2	Giacomo Nicotera		(substituted off) 50'
LP	1	Ivan Nemer		(substituted off) 40'
Replacements:
HK	16	Hame Faiva		(substituted on) 50'
PR	17	Federico Zani		(substituted on) 40'
PR	18	Pietro Ceccarelli		(substituted on) 57'
LK	19	Federico Ruzza		(substituted on) 71'
N8	20	Lorenzo Cannone		(substituted on) 14'	(substituted off) 23'	(substituted on) 60'
SH	21	Alessandro Fusco		(substituted on) 49'
FH	22	Tommaso Allan		(substituted on) 57'
FB	23	Lorenzo Pani		(substituted on) 60'
Coach:
(New Zealand) Kieran Crowley

FB	15	Hinckley Vaovasa
RW	14	Marius Simionescu
OC	13	Jason Tomane		(substituted off) 57'
IC	12	Taylor Gontineac
LW	11	Nicolas Onuțu		(substituted off) 47'
FH	10	Mihai Mureșan		(substituted off) 29'
SH	9	Alin Conache
N8	8	Cristi Chirică (c)	(yellow card) 46'
OF	7	Vlad Neculau		(substituted off) 70'
BF	6	Damian Strătilă		(substituted off) 47'
RL	5	Stefan Iancu
LL	4	Adrian Motoc (red card) 10'
TP	3	Alexandru Gordaș		(substituted off) 34'
HK	2	Ovidiu Cojocaru		(substituted off) 50'
LP	1	Iulian Hartig		(substituted off) 47'
Replacements:
HK	16	Florin Bărdașu		(substituted on) 50'
PR	17	Alexandru Savin		(substituted on) 47'
PR	18	Gheorghe Gajion		(substituted on) 34'
FL	19	Cristi Boboc		(substituted on) 47'
FL	20	Dragoș Ser		(substituted on) 70'
SH	21	Florin Surugiu		(substituted on) 57'
FH	22	Gabriel Pop		(substituted on) 47'
CE	23	Tudor Boldor		(substituted on) 29'
Coach:
(Romania) Eugen Apjok

Assistant referees:
Adam Leal (England)
Anthony Woodthorpe (England)
Television match official:
Ben Blain (Scotland)

19 August 2023
21:05 CEST (UTC+02)

France	34–17	Fiji
Try: Mauvaka 30' c Atonio 41' m Macalou 59' c Con: Jaminet (2/3) 31', 60'; Pen: Jaminet (5/5) 5', 7', 10', 42', 71'	Report	Try: Ikanivere 34' c Radradra 51' c Con: Muntz (2/2) 35', 52'; Pen: Muntz (1/1) 20'

Stade de la Beaujoire, Nantes
Attendance: 32,583
Referee: Nika Amashukeli (Georgia)

Team details

FB	15	Melvyn Jaminet
RW	14	Louis Bielle-Biarrey
OC	13	Arthur Vincent
IC	12	Jonathan Danty
LW	11	Yoram Moefana
FH	10	Antoine Hastoy	(substituted off) 62'
SH	9	Maxime Lucu	(substituted off) 62'
N8	8	Grégory Alldritt (c)	(substituted off) 52'
OF	7	Dylan Cretin
BF	6	François Cros	(substituted off) 55'
RL	5	Paul Willemse	(substituted off) 62'
LL	4	Florian Verhaeghe	(substituted off) 62'
TP	3	Uini Atonio	(substituted off) 44'
HK	2	Peato Mauvaka
LP	1	Reda Wardi	(substituted off) 44'
Replacements:
HK	16	Pierre Bourgarit	(substituted on) 55'
PR	17	Jean-Baptiste Gros	(substituted on) 44'
PR	18	Thomas Laclayat	(substituted on) 44'
LK	19	Bastien Chalureau	(substituted on) 62'
LK	20	Thibaud Flament	(substituted on) 62'
FL	21	Sekou Macalou	(substituted on) 52'
SH	22	Baptiste Serin	(substituted on) 62'
FH	23	Matthieu Jalibert	(substituted on) 62'
Coach:
(France) Fabien Galthié

FB	15	Sireli Maqala	(substituted off) 67'
RW	14	Jiuta Wainiqolo	(substituted off) 72'
OC	13	Iosefo Masi	(substituted off) 41'
IC	12	Semi Radradra (c)
LW	11	Vinaya Habosi
FH	10	Caleb Muntz
SH	9	Frank Lomani
N8	8	Viliame Mata
OF	7	Levani Botia	(substituted off) 74'
BF	6	Meli Derenalagi	(substituted off) 30'
RL	5	Te Ahiwaru Cirikidaveta
LL	4	Isoa Nasilasila
TP	3	Mesake Doge	(substituted off) 41'
HK	2	Tevita Ikanivere	(substituted off) 51'
LP	1	Eroni Mawi	(substituted off) 67'
Replacements:
HK	16	Sam Matavesi	(substituted on) 51'
PR	17	Jone Koroiduadua	(substituted on) 67'
PR	18	Luke Tagi	(substituted on) 41'
LK	19	Temo Mayanavanua	(substituted on) 74'
FL	20	Albert Tuisue	(substituted on) 30'
CE	21	Kalaveti Ravouvou	(substituted on) 67'
SH	22	Simione Kuruvoli	(substituted on) 72'
FB	23	Ilaisa Droasese	(substituted on) 41'
Coach:
(Fiji) Simon Raiwalui

Assistant referees:
Andrea Piardi (Italy)
Federico Vedovelli (Italy)
Television match official:
Ian Tempest (England)
Foul play review officer:
Brian MacNeice (Ireland)

=== 25/26/27 August ===
25 August 2023
19:30 BST (UTC+01)

New Zealand	7–35	South Africa
Try: Roigard 70' c Con: Mo'unga (1/1) 71'		Try: Kolisi 17' c Arendse 33' c Marx 41' c Mbonambi 58' c Smith 66' c Con: Libbok (5/5) 18', 34', 42', 60', 68'

Twickenham Stadium, London, England
Attendance: 80,827
Referee: Matthew Carley (England)

Team details

FB	15	Beauden Barrett
RW	14	Will Jordan		(substituted off) 63'
OC	13	Rieko Ioane
IC	12	Jordie Barrett
LW	11	Mark Tele'a
FH	10	Richie Mo'unga
SH	9	Aaron Smith		(substituted off) 61'
N8	8	Ardie Savea
OF	7	Sam Cane (c)	(yellow card) 15'	(substituted off) 63'
BF	6	Luke Jacobson		(substituted off) 40'
RL	5	Scott Barrett	(yellow card) 14' (yellow card) 39' (red card)
LL	4	Sam Whitelock		(substituted off) 51'
TP	3	Tyrel Lomax		(substituted off) 14'
HK	2	Dane Coles		(substituted off) 41'
LP	1	Ethan de Groot		(substituted off) 51'
Replacements:
HK	16	Samisoni Taukei'aho		(substituted on) 41'
PR	17	Tamaiti Williams		(substituted on) 51'
PR	18	Fletcher Newell		(substituted on) 14'
LK	19	Josh Lord		(substituted on) 51'
LK	20	Tupou Vaa'i		(substituted on) 40'
FL	21	Dalton Papalii		(substituted on) 63'
SH	22	Cam Roigard		(substituted on) 61'
CE	23	Anton Lienert-Brown		(substituted on) 63'
Coach:
(New Zealand) Ian Foster

FB	15	Damian Willemse
RW	14	Kurt-Lee Arendse
OC	13	Canan Moodie
IC	12	André Esterhuizen
LW	11	Makazole Mapimpi	(substituted off) 63'
FH	10	Manie Libbok
SH	9	Faf de Klerk
N8	8	Duane Vermeulen	(substituted off) 47'
BF	7	Pieter-Steph du Toit (yellow card) 51'
OF	6	Siya Kolisi (c)	(substituted off) 47'
RL	5	Franco Mostert	(substituted off) 47'
LL	4	Eben Etzebeth	(substituted off) 47'
TP	3	Frans Malherbe	(substituted off) 47'
HK	2	Malcolm Marx	(substituted off) 47'
LP	1	Steven Kitshoff	(substituted off) 47'
Replacements:
HK	16	Bongi Mbonambi	(substituted on) 47'
PR	17	Ox Nché	(substituted on) 47'
PR	18	Trevor Nyakane	(substituted on) 47'
LK	19	Jean Kleyn	(substituted on) 47'
LK	20	RG Snyman	(substituted on) 47'
FL	21	Marco van Staden	(substituted on) 47'
SH	22	Cobus Reinach	(substituted on) 63'
FL	23	Kwagga Smith	(substituted on) 47'
Coach:
(South Africa) Jacques Nienaber

Assistant referees:
Christophe Ridley (England)
Craig Evans (Wales)
Television match official:
Tom Foley (England)
Foul play review officer:
Brian MacNeice (Ireland)

Notes:

- This was New Zealand's heaviest-ever defeat (28 points), surpassing Australia's 21-point victories over New Zealand (1999, 2019).

26 August 2023
16:00 CAT (UTC+02)

Namibia	30–43	(South Africa) Bulls

Vegkop Stadium, Windhoek

26 August 2023
15:15 BST (UTC+01)

England	22–30	Fiji
Try: May 9' m Smith 57' c Marchant 68' c Con: Ford (2/3) 58', 69'; Pen: Ford (1/1) 6'	Report	Try: Nayacalevu 43' c Habosi 52' c Kuruvoli 72' c Con: Muntz (3/3) 44', 54', 74'; Pen: Muntz (3/3) 18', 56', 62'

Twickenham Stadium, London
Attendance: 56,854
Referee: Jaco Peyper (South Africa)

Team details

FB	15	Freddie Steward	(substituted off) 54'
RW	14	Max Malins
OC	13	Ollie Lawrence	(substituted off) 54'
IC	12	Manu Tuilagi
LW	11	Jonny May
FH	10	George Ford
SH	9	Alex Mitchell	(substituted off) 70'
N8	8	Ben Earl
OF	7	Jack Willis	(substituted off) 57'
BF	6	Courtney Lawes (c)
RL	5	Ollie Chessum	(substituted off) 70'
LL	4	Maro Itoje
TP	3	Dan Cole	(substituted off) 70'
HK	2	Theo Dan	(substituted off) 74'
LP	1	Ellis Genge	(substituted off) 51'
Replacements:
HK	16	Jack Walker	(substituted on) 74'
PR	17	Joe Marler	(substituted on) 51'
PR	18	Will Stuart	(substituted on) 70'
LK	19	David Ribbans	(substituted on) 70'
FL	20	Lewis Ludlam	(substituted on) 57'
SH	21	Danny Care	(substituted on) 70'
FH	22	Marcus Smith	(substituted on) 54'
CE	23	Joe Marchant	(substituted on) 54'
Coach:
(England) Steve Borthwick

FB	15	Ilaisa Droasese
RW	14	Selestino Ravutaumada
OC	13	Waisea Nayacalevu (c)		(substituted off) 75'
IC	12	Semi Radradra		(substituted off) 65'
LW	11	Vinaya Habosi
FH	10	Caleb Muntz
SH	9	Frank Lomani		(substituted off) 49'
N8	8	Viliame Mata		(substituted off) 78'
OF	7	Lekima Tagitagivalu		(substituted off) 40'	(substituted on) 49'	(substituted off) 62'
BF	6	Albert Tuisue		(substituted off) 52'	(substituted on) 65'
RL	5	Te Ahiwaru Cirikidaveta			(substituted off) 65'
LL	4	Isoa Nasilasila
TP	3	Luke Tagi		(substituted off) 70'
HK	2	Sam Matavesi
LP	1	Eroni Mawi	(yellow card) 39'			(substituted off) 62'
Replacements:
HK	16	Zuriel Togiatama		(substituted on) 78'
PR	17	Jone Koroiduadua		(substituted on) 40'	(substituted off) 49'	(substituted on) 62'
PR	18	Samu Tawake		(substituted on) 70'
LK	19	Temo Mayanavanua				(substituted on) 62'
FL	20	Vilive Miramira		(substituted on) 52'
SH	21	Simione Kuruvoli		(substituted on) 49'
FH	22	Teti Tela		(substituted on) 75'
CE	23	Kalaveti Ravouvou		(substituted on) 65'
Coach:
(Fiji) Simon Raiwalui

Player of the Match:
Selestino Ravutaumada (Fiji)

Assistant referees:
Pierre Brousset (France)
Hollie Davidson (Scotland)
Television match official:
Brian MacNeice (Ireland)
Foul play review officer:
Craig Evans (Wales)

Notes:

- This was England's first-ever defeat against a tier-two nation.
- This was Fiji's first-ever win against England.
- Courtney Lawes became the fifth Englishman to earn 100 test caps.

26 August 2023
18:30 CEST (UTC+02)

Italy	42–21	Japan
Try: Varney 6' c Ioane (3) 20' c, 56' m, 76' c Page-Relo 80' c Con: Allan (4/5) 7', 21', 77', 80'; Pen: Allan (3/3) 37', 46', 65'	Report	Try: Naikabula 16' m Matsushima 52' c Riley 71' m Con: Matsuda (1/2) 53'; Pen: Lee Seung-sin (2/2) 34', 40'

Stadio Comunale di Monigo, Treviso
Referee: Karl Dickson (England)

Team details

FB	15	Tommaso Allan
RW	14	Ange Capuozzo	(substituted off) 63'
OC	13	Ignacio Brex
IC	12	Luca Morisi
LW	11	Monty Ioane
FH	10	Paolo Garbisi
SH	9	Stephen Varney	(substituted off) 72'
N8	8	Lorenzo Cannone	(substituted off) 54'
OF	7	Michele Lamaro (c)
BF	6	Sebastian Negri
RL	5	Federico Ruzza	(substituted off) 72'
LL	4	Niccolò Cannone	(substituted off) 54'
TP	3	Simone Ferrari	(substituted off) 54'
HK	2	Giacomo Nicotera	(substituted off) 28' (substituted on) 39' (substituted off) 69'
LP	1	Ivan Nemer	(substituted off) 29'
Replacements:
HK	16	Luca Bigi	(substituted on) 28' (substituted off) 39' (substituted on) 69'
PR	17	Danilo Fischetti	(substituted on) 29'
PR	18	Pietro Ceccarelli	(substituted on) 54'
LK	19	Dino Lamb	(substituted on) 54'
FL	20	Giovanni Pettinelli	(substituted on) 72'
FL	21	Manuel Zuliani	(substituted on) 54'
SH	22	Martin Page-Relo	(substituted on) 72'
WG	23	Paolo Odogwu	(substituted on) 63'
Coach:
(New Zealand) Kieran Crowley

FB	15	Kotaro Matsushima
RW	14	Semisi Masirewa
OC	13	Dylan Riley
IC	12	Tomoki Osada	(substituted off) 68'
LW	11	Jone Naikabula
FH	10	Lee Seung-sin	(substituted off) 40'
SH	9	Yutaka Nagare	(substituted off) 58'
N8	8	Kazuki Himeno (c)
OF	7	Shota Fukui	(substituted off) 61'
BF	6	Michael Leitch
RL	5	Uwe Helu	(substituted off) 40'
LL	4	Jack Cornelsen
TP	3	Koo Ji-won	(substituted off) 54'
HK	2	Shota Horie	(substituted off) 61'
LP	1	Craig Millar	(substituted off) 54'
Replacements:
HK	16	Atsushi Sakate	(substituted on) 61'
PR	17	Keita Inagaki	(substituted on) 54'
PR	18	Asaeli Ai Valu	(substituted on) 54'
LK	19	Amanaki Saumaki	(substituted on) 40'
FL	20	Ben Gunter	(substituted on) 61'
SH	21	Naoto Saito	(substituted on) 58'
FH	22	Rikiya Matsuda	(substituted on) 40'
CE	23	Ryoto Nakamura	(substituted on) 68'
Coach:
(New Zealand) Jamie Joseph

Player of the Match:
Ange Capuozzo (Italy)

Assistant referees:
Chris Busby (Ireland)
Anthony Woodthorpe (England)
Television match official:
Stuart Terheege (England)
Foul play review officer:
Ian Tempest (England)

Notes:

- Amanaki Saumaki (Japan) made his international debut.

26 August 2023
17:30 BST (UTC+01)

Scotland	33–6	Georgia
Try: van der Merwe (2) 46' c, 77' m Darge 50' c Dempsey 58' c Steyn 68' c Con: Russell (2/2) 47', 51'; Healy (2/3) 59', 69'	Report	Pen: Matkava (2/2) 11', 20'

Murrayfield Stadium, Edinburgh
Attendance: 54,212
Referee: Mathieu Raynal (France)

Team details

FB	15	Ollie Smith
RW	14	Kyle Steyn
OC	13	Huw Jones	(substituted off) 60'
IC	12	Sione Tuipulotu
LW	11	Duhan van der Merwe
FH	10	Finn Russell	(substituted off) 52'
SH	9	Ben White	(substituted off) 52'
N8	8	Jack Dempsey
OF	7	Rory Darge	(substituted off) 52'
BF	6	Jamie Ritchie (c)
RL	5	Grant Gilchrist
LL	4	Sam Skinner	(substituted off) 60'
TP	3	WP Nel	(substituted off) 52'
HK	2	Dave Cherry	(substituted off) 52'
LP	1	Jamie Bhatti	(substituted off) 52'
Replacements:
HK	16	Ewan Ashman	(substituted on) 52'
PR	17	Rory Sutherland	(substituted on) 52'
PR	18	Javan Sebastian	(substituted on) 52'
LK	19	Scott Cummings	(substituted on) 60'
FL	20	Matt Fagerson	(substituted on) 52'
SH	21	George Horne	(substituted on) 52'
FH	22	Ben Healy	(substituted on) 52'
CE	23	Chris Harris	(substituted on) 60'
Coach:
(Scotland) Gregor Townsend

FB	15	Davit Niniashvili
RW	14	Aka Tabutsadze
OC	13	Demur Tapladze
IC	12	Merab Sharikadze (c)
LW	11	Mirian Modebadze
FH	10	Luka Matkava	(substituted off) 67'
SH	9	Vasil Lobzhanidze	(substituted off) 60'
N8	8	Tornike Jalaghonia
OF	7	Mikheil Gachechiladze
BF	6	Luka Ivanishvili	(substituted off) 74'
RL	5	Konstantin Mikautadze
LL	4	Lado Chachanidze	(substituted off) 39'
TP	3	Beka Gigashvili	(substituted off) 56'
HK	2	Shalva Mamukashvili	(substituted off) 37'
LP	1	Mikheil Nariashvili	(substituted off) 51'
Replacements:
HK	16	Tengiz Zamtaradze	(substituted on) 37'
PR	17	Guram Gogichashvili	(substituted on) 51'
PR	18	Guram Papidze	(substituted on) 56'
LK	19	Lasha Jaiani	(substituted on) 39'
FL	20	Sandro Mamamtavrishvili	(substituted on) 74'
SH	21	Gela Aprasidze	(substituted on) 60'
FH	22	Tedo Abzhandadze	(substituted on) 67'
CE	23	Giorgi Kveseladze
Coach:
(Georgia (country)) Levan Maisashvili

Player of the Match:
Duhan van der Merwe (Scotland)

Assistant referees:
Tual Trainini (France)
Ludovic Cayre (France)
Television match official:
Thomas Charabas (France)
Foul play review officer:
Joy Neville (Ireland)

26 August 2023
20:00 CEST (UTC+02)

Portugal	17–30	Australia A
Try: Martins 21' c Storti 32' c Con: Marques (2/2) 22', 33'; Pen: Marques (1/2) 62'	Report	Try: Wright 2' m Pietsch (2) 17' c, 44' m Swinton 79' c Con: Lonergan (1/3) 18'; Tuttle 80'; Pen: Lonergan (2/2) 69', 73'

Stade Jules-Ladoumègue, Massy, Essonne, France
Referee: Luc Ramos (France)

26 August 2023
20:45 CEST (UTC+02)

Spain	3–62	Argentina
Pen: Vinuesa (1/1) 28'		Try: Mallia 12' c Sclavi 14' c M. Carreras 24' c Cubelli 34' c Kremer 57' c de la Fuente 58' c Bogado (2) 63' c, 80' c Isa 67' m Con: Sánchez (7/9) 13', 15', 25', 35', 58', 64', 80'; Pen: Sánchez (1/1) 4'

Metropolitano Stadium, Madrid
Referee: Andrew Brace (Ireland)

26 August 2023
21:00 CEST (UTC+02)

Ireland	17–13	Samoa
Try: O'Brien 8' c Murray 51' m Herring 64' m Con: Crowley (1/3) 9'	Report	Try: Paia'aua 35' c Con: Sopoaga (1/1) 36'; Pen: Sopoaga (2/2) 40', 46'

Stade Jean-Dauger, Bayonne, France
Attendance: 14,370
Referee: Wayne Barnes (England)

Team details

FB	15	Jimmy O'Brien	(substituted off) 53'
RW	14	Mack Hansen
OC	13	Robbie Henshaw
IC	12	Stuart McCloskey
LW	11	Jacob Stockdale	(substituted off) 66'
FH	10	Jack Crowley
SH	9	Conor Murray	(substituted off) 72'
N8	8	Caelan Doris
OF	7	Josh van der Flier
BF	6	Ryan Baird	(substituted off) 60'
RL	5	Tadhg Beirne
LL	4	Iain Henderson (c)	(substituted off) 60'
TP	3	Finlay Bealham	(substituted off) 63'
HK	2	Tom Stewart	(substituted off) 50'
LP	1	Cian Healy	(substituted off) 21'
Replacements:
HK	16	Rob Herring	(substituted on) 50'
PR	17	Jeremy Loughman	(substituted on) 21'
PR	18	Tom O'Toole	(substituted on) 63'
LK	19	James Ryan	(substituted on) 60'
FL	20	Peter O'Mahony	(substituted on) 60'
SH	21	Craig Casey	(substituted on) 72'
FH	22	Ross Byrne	(substituted on) 53'
CE	23	Garry Ringrose	(substituted on) 66'
Coach:
(England) Andy Farrell

FB	15	Duncan Paia'aua
RW	14	Ed Fidow	(substituted off) 50'
OC	13	UJ Seuteni
IC	12	Tumua Manu
LW	11	Nigel Ah Wong
FH	10	Lima Sopoaga
SH	9	Jonathan Taumateine	(substituted off) 68'
N8	8	Steve Luatua	(substituted off) 63'
OF	7	Fritz Lee
BF	6	Taleni Seu
RL	5	Theo McFarland
LL	4	Chris Vui (c)	(substituted off) 40'
TP	3	Paul Alo-Emile	(substituted off) 47'
HK	2	Seilala Lam	(substituted off) 51'
LP	1	James Lay	(substituted off) 63'
Replacements:
HK	16	Sama Malolo	(substituted on) 51'
PR	17	Jordan Lay	(substituted on) 63'
PR	18	Michael Alaalatoa	(substituted on) 47'
LK	19	Miracle Faiʻilagi	(substituted on) 63'
FL	20	Jordan Taufua	(substituted on) 40'
SH	21	Ere Enari	(substituted on) 68'
FH	22	Christian Leali'ifano
CE	23	Neria Fomai	(substituted on) 50'
Coach:
(Samoa) Seilala Mapusua

Assistant referees:
Andrea Piardi (Italy)
Adam Leal (England)
Television match official:
Ben Blain (Scotland)

Notes:

- Lima Sopoaga (Samoa) made his debut for Samoa, having previously represented New Zealand.

26 August 2023
17:00 CLT (UTC-04)

Chile	26–28	Argentina XV
Try: Fernández 40' c Saavedra 47' c Con: S. Videla (2/2) 40', 48'; Pen: S. Videla (4/4) 4', 26', 32', 66'	Report	Try: Delguy 12' c Castro 61' c Gurovich 74' m Con: de la Vega Mendía (2/3) 13', 62'; Pen: de la Vega Mendía (3/3) 18', 31', 45'

Estadio Germán Becker, Temuco
Referee: Frank Murphy (Ireland)

27 August 2023
17:45 CEST (UTC+02)

France	41–17	Australia
Try: Danty 7' c Penaud (2) 56' c, 74' c Villière 63' m Con: Ramos (2/3) 8', 58'; Jaminet (1/1) 76'; Pen: Ramos (4/4) 25', 28', 36', 54'; Jaminet (1/1) 80+1'	Report	Try: Nawaqanitawase 13' m McReight 61' c Vunivalu 78' m Con: Gordon (1/3) 62'

Stade de France, Saint-Denis
Attendance: 80,000
Referee: Luke Pearce (England)

Team details

FB	15	Thomas Ramos	(substituted off) 69'
RW	14	Damian Penaud
OC	13	Gaël Fickou
IC	12	Jonathan Danty
LW	11	Gabin Villière
FH	10	Matthieu Jalibert
SH	9	Antoine Dupont (c)	(substituted off) 60'
N8	8	Grégory Alldritt	(substituted off) 65'
OF	7	Charles Ollivon
BF	6	François Cros
RL	5	Paul Willemse	(substituted off) 47'
LL	4	Thibaud Flament	(substituted off) 47'
TP	3	Uini Atonio	(substituted off) 47'
HK	2	Julien Marchand	(substituted off) 47'
LP	1	Jean-Baptiste Gros	(substituted off) 47'
Replacements:
HK	16	Peato Mauvaka	(substituted on) 47'
PR	17	Sébastien Taofifénua	(substituted on) 47'
PR	18	Dorian Aldegheri	(substituted on) 47'
LK	19	Romain Taofifénua	(substituted on) 47'
LK	20	Cameron Woki	(substituted on) 47'
FL	21	Paul Boudehent	(substituted on) 65'
SH	22	Baptiste Couilloud	(substituted on) 60'
FB	23	Melvyn Jaminet	(substituted on) 69'
Coach:
(France) Fabien Galthié

FB	15	Andrew Kellaway		(substituted off) 70'
RW	14	Mark Nawaqanitawase
OC	13	Jordan Petaia
IC	12	Lalakai Foketi
LW	11	Suliasi Vunivalu	(yellow card) 52'
FH	10	Carter Gordon
SH	9	Tate McDermott		(substituted off) 72'
N8	8	Rob Valetini		(substituted off) 68'
OF	7	Fraser McReight
BF	6	Tom Hooper
RL	5	Will Skelton (c)		(substituted off) 72'
LL	4	Richie Arnold		(substituted off) 62'
TP	3	Taniela Tupou		(substituted off) 68'
HK	2	Dave Porecki		(substituted off) 68'
LP	1	Angus Bell		(substituted off) 72'
Replacements:
HK	16	Matt Faessler		(substituted on) 68'
PR	17	Blake Schoupp		(substituted on) 72'
PR	18	Zane Nonggorr		(substituted on) 68'
LK	19	Matt Philip		(substituted on) 72'
FL	20	Rob Leota		(substituted on) 62'
FL	21	Langi Gleeson		(substituted on) 68'
SH	22	Issak Fines-Leleiwasa		(substituted on) 72'
FH	23	Ben Donaldson		(substituted on) 70'
Coach:
(Australia) Eddie Jones

Assistant referees:
Christophe Ridley (England)
Craig Evans (Wales)
Television match official:
Tom Foley (England)
Foul play review officer:
Joy Neville (Ireland)

Notes:

- Issak Fines-Leleiwasa and Blake Schoupp (both Australia) made their international debuts.
- France retained the Trophée des Bicentenaires, and won the trophy consecutively for the first time since the inception of the trophy in 1989.

== See also ==
- 2023 Rugby Championship
