= Tanginoa =

Tanginoa is a given name and surname. Notable people with the name include:

- Tanginoa Halaifonua (born 1996), Tongan rugby union player
- Kelepi Tanginoa (born 1994), Australian rugby league player
