= Lekima Tagitagivalu =

Fijian rugby union player

Lekima Vuda Tagitagivalu
- Full name: Lekima Vuda Tagitagivalu
- Born: 4 December 1995 (age 30) Lautoka, Fiji
- Height: 192 cm (6 ft 4 in)
- Weight: 110 kg (243 lb; 17 st 5 lb)
- School: Tilak High School
- Notable relative: Ropate Ratu (brother)

Rugby union career
- Position(s): Second Row, Flanker
- Current team: Section Paloise
Youth career
- 2013-2014: Aurillac
- 2015-2017: Pau
Senior career
Years	Team	Apps	(Points)
2017-	Pau	80	(15)
- Correct as of 15 January 2024
International career
Years	Team	Apps	(Points)
2015	Fiji under-20s	4	(0)
2022	Barbarians	1	(5)
2023-	Fiji	7	(5)
- Correct as of 15 January 2024

Lekima Tagitagivalu (born 4 December 1995) is a Fijian rugby union player who plays at French Top 14 side Pau.

== Career ==
=== Club ===
Tagitagivalu spent a season at Aurillac Espoirs before joining Pau Espoirs in 2015. He went on to make his debut of the senior side in 2017, coming off the bench to score a try against Zebre Parma in the Challenge Cup.

=== International ===
He featured for the Fiji under-20 side for the 2015 World Rugby Under 20 Championship.

In 2022 he was invited to play for the Barbarians in a match against the All Blacks XV, he scored a try in the 35–31 win.

In 2023 he was called up to the Fiji squad for the 2023 Pacific Nations Cup, after two strong performances against Tonga and Japan, Tagitagivalu was called up to the Fiji squad for the 2023 Rugby World Cup.

== Honors ==
=== Fiji ===
Pacific Nations Cup, 2023
