= Josh Bayliss =

Scotland international rugby union player

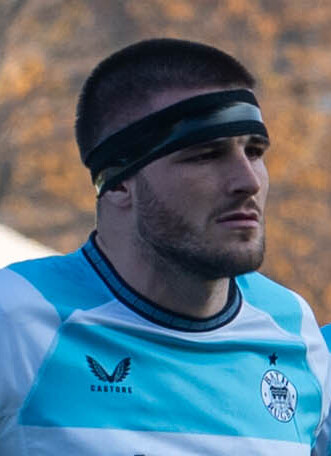
- Bayliss representing Bath in the ERC in December 2024
- Full name: Joshua David Bayliss
- Born: 18 September 1997 (age 29) Tiverton, England
- Height: 1.90 m (6 ft 3 in)
- Weight: 106 kg (234 lb; 16 st 10 lb)
- School: Wellington School; Millfield

Rugby union career
- Position(s): Flanker, Number 8
- Current team: Bath
Senior career
Years	Team	Apps	(Points)
2016–	Bath	151	(90)
- Correct as of 3 Aug 2026
International career
Years	Team	Apps	(Points)
2017	England U20	9	(15)
2021–	Scotland	21	(30)
2026	Scotland 'A'	1	(0)
- Correct as of 18 November 2026

Joshua David Bayliss (born 18 September 1997) is a Scotland international rugby union player who plays as a number eight for Premiership Rugby club Bath. Born in England, he represents Scotland at international level after qualifying on ancestry grounds.

== Early life ==
Bayliss attended Millfield School in Somerset where he was head boy, and played cricket, hockey and represented the school in triple jump, as well as playing rugby.

== Club career ==
He made his first team debut against Leicester Tigers in the Anglo-Welsh Cup in November 2016 and made further appearances against Scarlets and Gloucester Rugby.

The following season saw Bayliss play in wins over the Newcastle Falcons and Ospreys during the pool stage of the Anglo-Welsh Cup and on 30 March 2018 he started in the final of the competition as Bath were defeated by Exeter Chiefs to finish runners up.

In March 2024, having made 110 appearances for Bath he signed a new three-year contract with the club.

== International career ==
Bayliss was a member of the England under-20 side that completed the grand slam during the 2017 Six Nations Under 20s Championship and later that year came off the bench as England lost to New Zealand in the final of the 2017 World Rugby Under 20 Championship to finish runners up.

Bayliss was called up to the Scotland squad for the 2021 Six Nations Championship, qualifying through his Aberdonian grandmother. Bayliss made his international debut on 7 November 2021 for Scotland against Australia in an Autumn International, when he came on as a substitute. He made his first international start against Japan on 20 November 2021.

He played for Scotland 'A' on 6 February 2026 in their match against Italy XV.

== Career statistics ==
=== List of international tries ===
No.	Date	Venue	Opponent	Score	Result	Competition
1	29 July 2023	Murrayfield Stadium, Edinburgh, Scotland	Italy	23–13	25–13	2023 Rugby World Cup warm-up matches
2	6 July 2024	TD Place Stadium, Ottawa, Canada	Canada	5–5	73–12	2024 mid-year rugby union tests
3	20 July 2024	Estadio Nacional Julio Martínez Prádanos, Santiago, Chile	Chile	5–0	52–11	2024 mid-year rugby union tests
4	16 November 2024	Murrayfield, Edinburgh, Scotland	Portugal	31–0	59–21	2024 end-of-year rugby union internationals
5	24 November 2024	Murrayfield, Edinburgh, Scotland	Australia	22–6	27–13	2024 end-of-year rugby union internationals
6	11 July 2026	Loftus Versfeld Stadium, Pretoria, South Africa	South Africa	19–35	28–42	2026 Nations Championship
