= Lorenzo Pani =

Italy international rugby union player

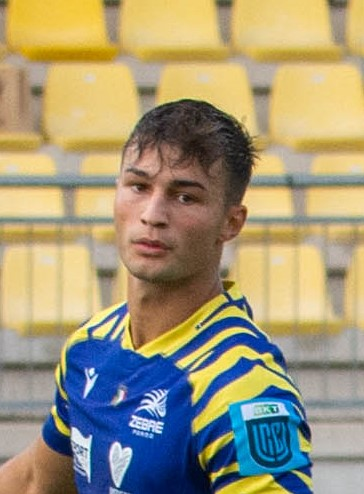
- Pani in 2022
- Born: 4 July 2002 (age 24) Florence, Italy
- Height: 1.90 m (6 ft 3 in)
- Weight: 92 kg (14.5 st; 203 lb)

Rugby union career
- Position: Fullback
- Current team: Zebre Parma
Youth career
- Sesto Rugby
- –: I Cavalieri Prato
Senior career
Years	Team	Apps	(Points)
2020−2021	F.I.R. Academy	-	(-)
2021–2022	Benetton	3	(0)
2022−	Zebre	39	(45)
- Correct as of 9 Aug 2026
International career
Years	Team	Apps	(Points)
2021–2022	Italy U20	13	(18)
2023–	Italy	14	(15)
- Correct as of 9 Aug 2026
National sevens team
Years	Team		Comps
2023−	Italy Sevens		2

Lorenzo Pani (born 4 July 2002) is an Italian rugby union player, currently playing for Italian United Rugby Championship side Zebre Parma. His preferred position is fullback.

Pani signed for Benetton in July 2021 ahead of the 2021–22 United Rugby Championship. He made his debut in Round 2 of the 2021–22 EPCR Challenge Cup against Gloucester. He played with Benetton until April 2022.

In 2021 and 2022, Pani was named in Italy U20s squad for annual Six Nations Under 20s Championship. On 5 July 2023, he was selected by Kieran Crowley to be part of an Italy squad for the 2023 Rugby World Cup warm-up matches. He made his debut against Scotland in the first match of 29 July 2023 .

On 22 August 2023, he was named in the Italy's 33-man squad for the 2023 Rugby World Cup.

In June 2023, he was also named in Italy Sevens squad for the 2023 Rugby Europe Sevens Championship Series.
