= Tommaso Boni =

Italy & US international rugby union player

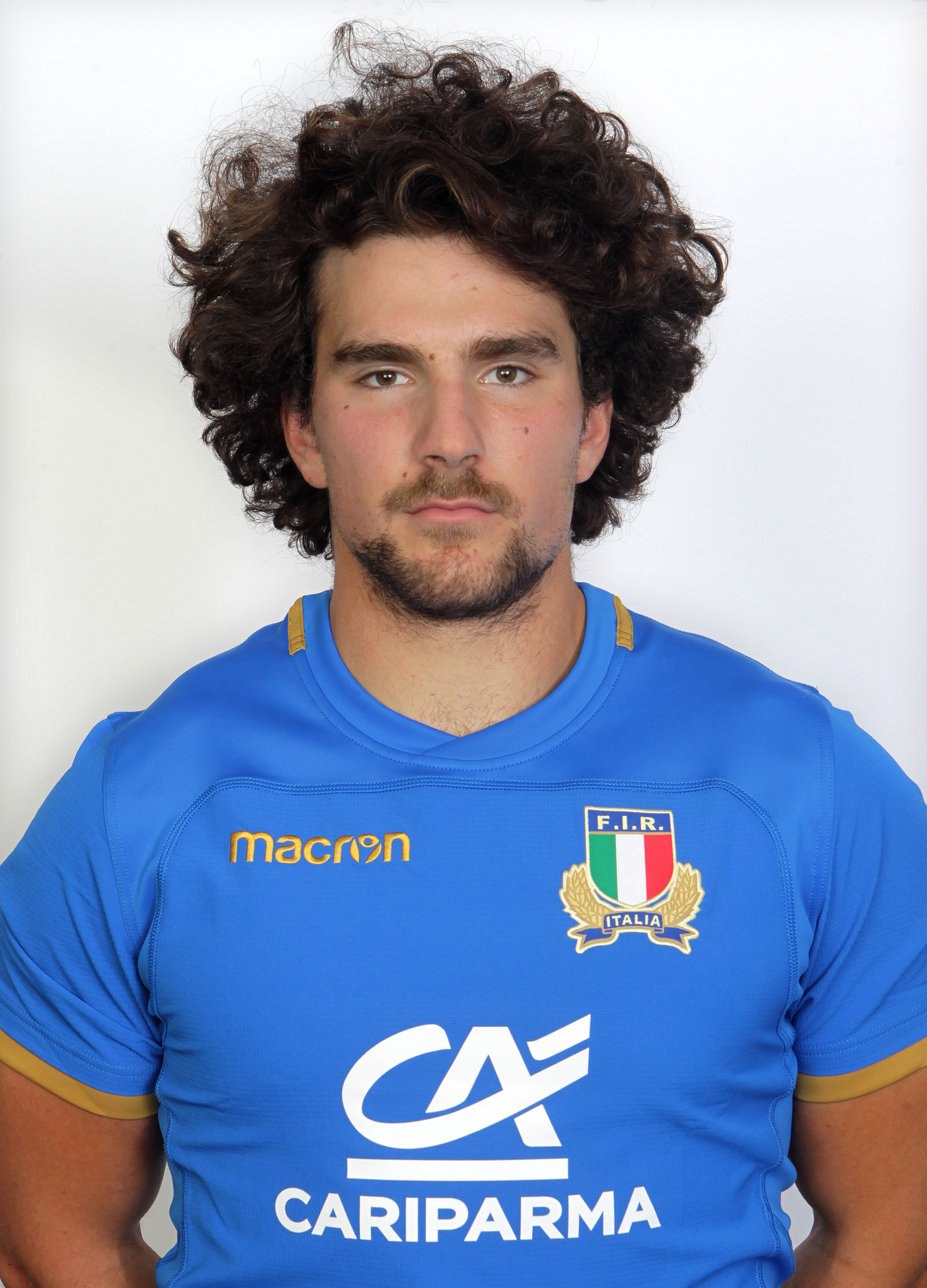
- Born: 15 January 1993 (age 33) Mestre, Venice
- Height: 1.87 m (6 ft 2 in)
- Weight: 100 kg (15 st 10 lb; 220 lb)

Rugby union career
- Position: Centre
- Current team: Rugby Mogliano
Youth career
- Rugby Mogliano
Senior career
Years	Team	Apps	(Points)
2012−2013	F.I.R. Academy		
2013−2015	Rugby Mogliano	43	(35)
2015−2023	Zebre	117	(75)
2024−2025	Old Glory DC	20	(0)
2026−	Rugby Mogliano		
- Correct as of 24 Dec 2022
International career
Years	Team	Apps	(Points)
2012−2013	Italy Under 20	5	(5)
2014	Emerging Italy	2	(0)
2016−2018	Italy	12	(5)
2023−	United States	11	(15)
- Correct as of 19 Aug 2023

Tommaso Boni (born 15 January 1993) is a professional rugby union player. His usual position is as a centre and he currently plays for Rugby Mogliano in Italian Serie A Elite.

He played for Zebre Parma from 2015 to October 2023. From 2023 to 2025 he played for Old Glory DC in American Major League Rugby.

== International ==
=== Italy ===
In 2012 and 2013 Boni was named in the Italy Under 20 squad and in 2014 he was part of Emerging Italy squad. In 2016 he was also named in the Italy squad.

=== United States ===
Interim head coach Scott Lawrence named a 30-player U.S.A squad for the 2023 Summer Series in Europe. He made his debut for the U.S. on August 5, 2023 against Romania, and played again against Georgia on August 19, 2023. Boni is eligible to play for the U.S. through his U.S.-born grandfather.
