= Luke White (rugby union) =

US international rugby union player

- Born: October 16, 1991 (age 35) Sydney, Australia
- Height: 6 ft 3 in (191 cm)
- Weight: 255 lb (116 kg)
- School: Saint Ignatius' College
- Notable relative: Rebecca Clough (cousin)

Rugby union career
- Position: Back-row / Lock / Prop
Senior career
Years	Team	Apps	(Points)
2018–20	Colorado Raptors		
2021–22	LA Giltinis		
2023–	Chicago Hounds		
International career
Years	Team	Apps	(Points)
2023–	United States	5	(0)

Luke White (born October 16, 1991) is an Australian-born American international rugby union player.

== Early life ==
Born in Sydney, White was educated at Saint Ignatius' College, where he played in two GPS premierships with the school's 1st XV. He trained at rugby league side Wests Tigers before joining Shute Shield team Manly.

== Professional rugby ==
White, a forward, has been based in the United States since 2015, first playing for the Glendale Raptors. He was with the Raptors for their inaugural Major League Rugby season in 2018 and became captain the next season. A tournament winner with LA Giltinis in 2021, White later joined his third Major League side, the Chicago Hounds, for the 2023 season. White has won 2 Major League Rugby Championships, 2 Pacific Rugby Premierships and a Pro Rugby Championship since arriving in the USA.

=== International ===
White made his international debut for the United States in 2023, gaining his first cap against Romania in Bucharest.

== See also ==
- List of United States national rugby union players
