= Takaji Young Yen =

US international rugby union player

- Born: August 26, 1999 (age 27) Utah, United States
- School: King's College, Auckland
- University: University of Auckland

Rugby union career
- Position: Prop
Senior career
Years	Team	Apps	(Points)
2023–	Utah Warriors		
International career
Years	Team	Apps	(Points)
2023–	United States	1	(0)

Takaji Young Yen (born August 26, 1999) is a New Zealand-American professional rugby union player.

Young Yen was born in Utah and raised in Auckland, New Zealand, where he attended King's College.

A prop, Young Ken was a New Zealand Schools representative player during his time at King's and while attending the University of Auckland made appearances for the New Zealand Universities representative team.

Young Yen was signed by the Utah Warriors for the 2023 Major League Rugby season.

In 2023, Young Yen was capped for the United States against Romania at Stadionul Arcul de Triumf in Bucharest, coming on off the bench as a second-half substitute in a 31–17 win.

== See also ==
- List of United States national rugby union players
