= Martín Bogado =

Argentine rugby union player

- Full name: Martín Gabriel Bogado
- Born: 29 April 1998 (age 28) Misiones, Argentina
- Height: 1.92 m (6 ft 4 in)
- Weight: 98 kg (216 lb; 15 st 6 lb)

Rugby union career
- Position(s): Fullback, Wing
- Current team: Highlanders
Senior career
Years	Team	Apps	(Points)
2020-2021	Olímpia Lions	10	(5)
2021-2022	Jaguares XV	9	(40)
2022-2023	Bayonne	7	(10)
2023–	Highlanders	4	(10)
- Correct as of 31 January 2024
International career
Years	Team	Apps	(Points)
2021–	Argentina XV	4	(20)
2023–	Argentina	3	(15)
- Correct as of 31 January 2024

Martín Gabriel Bogado (born 29 April 1998) is an Argentine professional rugby union player who plays as a fullback for Super Rugby club Highlanders and the Argentina national team.

== Club career ==
Bogado was a product of the Club Centro de Cazadores de Misiones club, before moving to Jockey Club Córdoba. He represented Olímpia Lions in the 2021 SLAR, before joining Jaguares XV for the 2022 edition. He joined Bayonne as a medical joker in late-2022, before the Highlanders announced his signing on a two-year deal in November 2022.

He was named in the Highlanders squad for the 2023 Super Rugby Pacific season.

== International career ==
Bogado has represented Argentina XV on four occasions. He was also called up to the full Argentina squad for a training camp in October 2022.
