= Genesis Mamea Lemalu =

Samoan rugby union player (born 1988)

- Full name: Genesis Pelepele Mamea Lemalu
- Born: 22 September 1988 (age 38) Samoa
- Height: 192 cm (6 ft 4 in)
- Weight: 109 kg (240 lb; 17 st 2 lb)
- School: St Bernard's College

Rugby union career
- Position: Flanker
- Current team: Perpignan
Senior career
Years	Team	Apps	(Points)
2012–2013	Wellington	13	(0)
2013–2014	Mont-de-Marsan	11	(5)
2014–2016	Bourgoin-Jallieu	42	(20)
2016–	Perpignan	113	(130)
- Correct as of 1 November 2021
International career
Years	Team	Apps	(Points)
2009	Samoa U20	5	(0)
2016–	Samoa	4	(0)
- Correct as of 1 November 2021

Genesis Mamea Lemalu (born 22 September 1988 in Samoa) is a Samoan rugby union player who plays for Perpignan in the Top 14. His playing position is flanker. Mamea Lemalu signed for Perpignan in 2016, having previously represented Wellington, Mont-de-Marsan and Bourgoin-Jallieu. He made his debut for Samoa in 2016 against France.
