= Gabe Casey =

Canada international rugby union player

- Full name: Gabriel Lee Casey
- Born: July 15, 1999 (age 27)
- School: Nepean High School
- University: University of Victoria

Rugby union career
- Position: Centre/Fly-half/Fullback
Senior career
Years	Team	Apps	(Points)
2023–	New England Free Jacks		
International career
Years	Team	Apps	(Points)
2023–	Canada	3	(0)

Gabriel Lee Casey (born July 15, 1999) is a Canadian rugby union player.

== Rugby career ==
Casey, a native of Ottawa, represented Canada at Under-18s and Under-20s level. He played for Ottawa's Bytown Blues club, before moving to British Columbia to attend the University of Victoria, where he competed in varsity rugby. In 2023, Casey was selected by the New England Free Jacks in the first round of the Major League Rugby draft.

=== International rugby ===
Casey made his debut for Canada off the bench against Tonga at Nukuʻalofa's Teufaiva Sport Stadium in 2023.

== Honours ==
New England Free Jacks

- Major League Rugby Championship: 2024

== See also ==
- List of Canada national rugby union players
