= Nick McCarthy (rugby union) =

US international rugby union player

- Born: 25 March 1995 (age 31) Ann Arbor, Michigan, U.S.
- Height: 1.80 m (5 ft 11 in)
- Weight: 84 kg (13.2 st; 185 lb)
- School: St Michael's College
- University: University College Dublin

Rugby union career
- Position: Scrum-half
Senior career
Years	Team	Apps	(Points)
2015-19	Leinster	36	(10)
2019-21	Munster	23	(0)
2021-23	Leinster	26	(5)
2023–	Chicago Hounds		
- Correct as of 13 May 2023
International career
Years	Team	Apps	(Points)
2013	Ireland U18		
2014–15	Ireland U20	18	(5)
2023-	United States	5	(5)
- Correct as of 19 Aug 2023

Nick McCarthy (born 25 March 1995) is an Irish rugby union player, currently playing for Major League Rugby side Chicago Hounds and formerly for Leinster and Munster. He plays as a scrum-half.

== Early life ==
Born in Ann Arbor, Michigan in the United States, McCarthy first began playing rugby aged 6 for Old Belvedere, and went on to attend St Michael's College, Dublin and represent the school in the Leinster Schools Senior Cup. McCarthy is studying engineering at University College Dublin and plays for UCD in the All-Ireland League. His father, Conor, was a scrum-half for Connacht, and his sister, Lisa, won a hockey scholarship in the United States, having represented Ireland at various age-grade levels.

== Professional career ==
=== Leinster ===
Having represented Leinster at under-16 and under-18 level, McCarthy joined the provinces sub-academy in 2013, before entering the full academy ahead of the 2014–15 season. He was promoted to the senior squad ahead of the 2017–18 season, and featured for the team in the semi-final and final during their victorious 2017–18 Pro14 season, as well as featuring in the quarter-final and semi-final for the province on their way to winning the 2017–18 European Rugby Champions Cup. During the following season, McCarthy again experienced domestic success, featuring off the bench during Leinster's 18–15 win against Glasgow Warriors in the final of the 2018–19 Pro14.

=== Munster ===
McCarthy joined Leinster's provincial rivals Munster on a two-year contract after the completion of the 2018–19 season, and made his competitive debut for the province in their opening 2019–20 Pro14 39–9 win against Welsh side Dragons on 28 September 2019. His final appearance for the province was in their 54–11 away win against Zebre in round 6 of the Pro14 Rainbow Cup on 11 June 2021.

=== Return to Leinster ===
McCarthy rejoined Leinster from the 2021–22 season.

== Ireland ==
McCarthy first represented Ireland at under-18 level in 2013, before going on to win selection for the under-20s in 2014, winning 18 caps and captaining the side in 2015.

== Honours ==
=== Leinster ===
- European Rugby Champions Cup:
  - Winner (1): 2017–18
- United Rugby Championship:
  - Winner (2): 2017–18, 2018–19

== Personal life ==
McCarthy came out as gay in June 2022, joining a small number of men to do so during their playing career.
