= Otumaka Mausia =

New Zealand rugby union player

- Born: 22 April 1997 (age 29) New Zealand
- Height: 189 cm (6 ft 2 in)
- Weight: 103 kg (227 lb; 16 st 3 lb)

Rugby union career
- Position: Fly-half / Wing / Fullback
- Current team: Moana Pasifika
Senior career
Years	Team	Apps	(Points)
2017	Auckland	3	(0)
2024–	Moana Pasifika		
- Correct as of 19 November 2023
International career
Years	Team	Apps	(Points)
2019–	Tonga	12	(22)
- Correct as of 19 November 2023
National sevens team
Years	Team		Comps
2018–2019	Tonga Sevens		3
- Correct as of 19 November 2023

Otumaka Mausia (born 22 April 1997) is a Tongan rugby union player, who plays for Moana Pasifika. His preferred position is fly-half, wing or fullback.

== Early career ==
Mausia plays his club rugby for College Rifles. He moved to Australia in 2022 and began representing Western Sydney Two Blues in the Shute Shield. He represented Tonga in sevens during a break from the 15-man code.

== Professional career ==
Mausia represented Auckland in the 2017 Mitre 10 Cup. He was named in the Moana Pasifika squad for the 2024 Super Rugby Pacific season.

Mausia debuted for Tonga in the 2019 World Rugby Pacific Nations Cup making his debut against Samoa. He would earn his next caps in the 2022 World Rugby Pacific Nations Cup. He was named in the Tongan squad for the 2023 Rugby World Cup, however was ruled out due to injury having not appeared in the tournament.
