= Jone Naikabula =

Japan international rugby union player

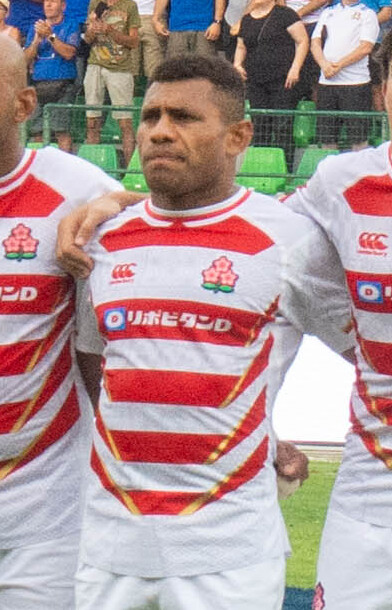
- Naikabula with Japan in 2023
- Born: 12 April 1994 (age 32) Fiji
- Height: 177 cm (5 ft 10 in)
- Weight: 95 kg (209 lb)
- School: Kelston Boys' High School
- University: Setsunan University
- Notable relative: Josifini Neihamu (sister)

Rugby union career
- Position: Wing
Senior career
Years	Team	Apps	(Points)
2018–	Toshiba Brave Lupus	82	(365)
International career
Years	Team	Apps	(Points)
2023–	Japan	18	(25)
National sevens team
Years	Team		Comps
	Japan Sevens		5

Jone Naikabula (born 12 April 1994) is a Fijian-born Japanese professional rugby union player.

== Biography ==
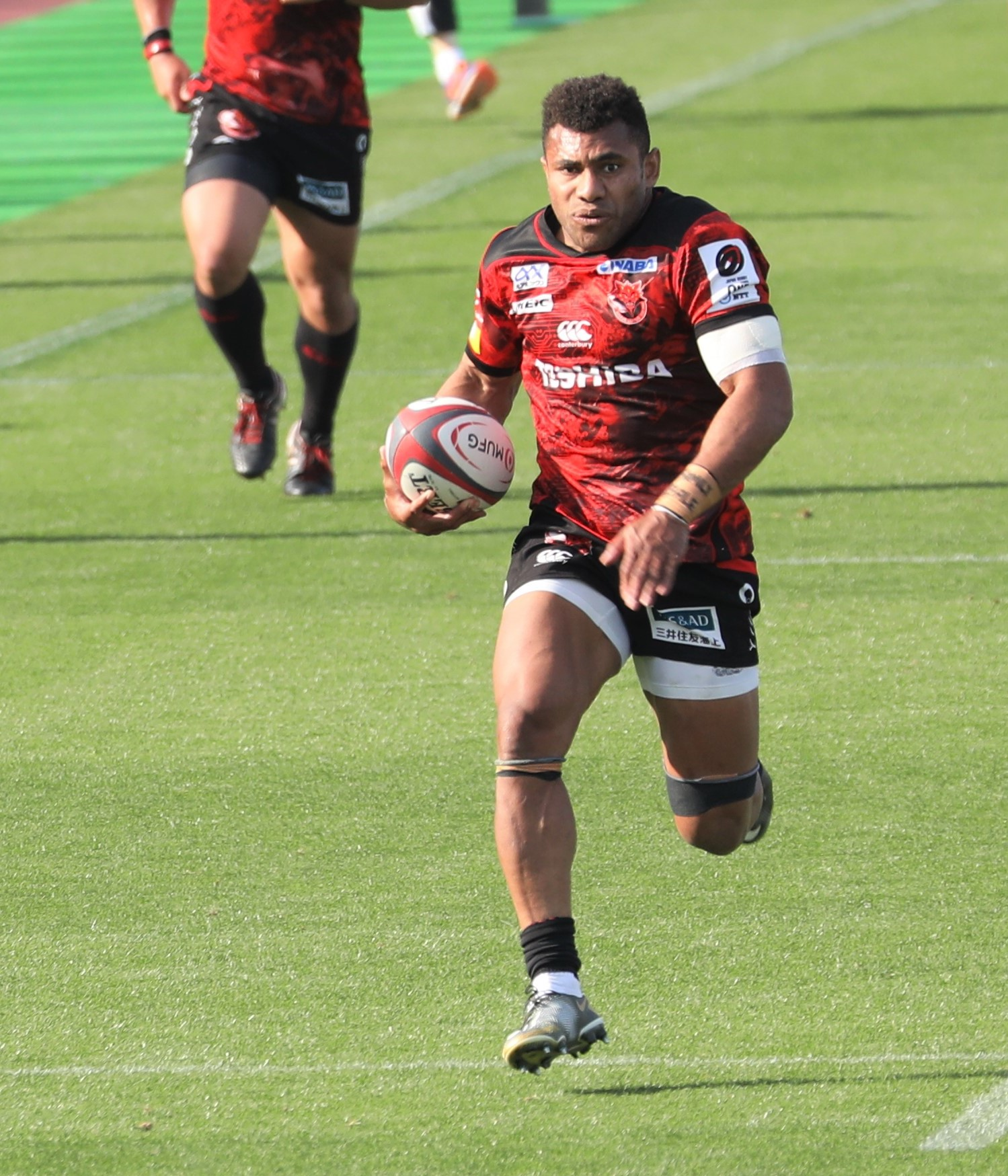
Naikabula running with the ball for Toshiba Brave Lupus.

Born and raised in Fiji, Naikabula comes from a small village in Nadroga, home to 200 people. He went to Auckland for the final few years of his schooling and attended Kelston Boys' High School, after which he took up a scholarship to Setsunan University in Osaka. After graduating from university, Naikabula was signed by Toshiba Brave Lupus.

Naikabula, a winger, made his rugby sevens debut for Japan in 2017 and represented his adopted country at the following year's Rugby World Cup Sevens in San Francisco. He broke into the Cherry Blossoms team in 2023 and was a member of the side at the Rugby World Cup in France, scoring tries against Chile and Argentina.

== See also ==
- List of Japan national rugby union players
