= Tanginoa Halaifonua =

Tonga international rugby union player

- Full name: Tanginoa Palu Halaifonua
- Born: 20 September 1996 (age 30)
- Height: 196 cm (6 ft 5 in)
- Weight: 115 kg (254 lb)

Rugby union career
- Position: Flanker / Lock
Senior career
Years	Team	Apps	(Points)
2017–18	Lyon OU		
2018–19	RC Massy		
2019–20	Lyon OU		
2020–23	FC Grenoble		
2023–	Stade Français		
International career
Years	Team	Apps	(Points)
2021–	Tonga	16	(5)

Tanginoa Palu Halaifonua (born 20 September 1996) is a Tongan professional rugby union player.

== Rugby career ==
Halaifonua, a back-rower and lock, is based in France and plays his rugby with Stade Français. He got his start in French rugby at Lyon OU in 2017, later competing for RC Massy and FC Grenoble, before joining Stade Français in 2023.

=== International ===
Halaifonua made his international debut for Tonga against Scotland at Murrayfield in 2021. He was a member of Tonga's team at the 2023 Rugby World Cup in France, appearing as a blindside flanker in three of their four group matches.

== See also ==
- List of Tonga national rugby union players
