= Summer Nations Series =

Rugby union matches for men's national teams

The Summer Nations Series is a series of international rugby union matches being played between 29 July and 27 August 2023, ahead of the 2023 Rugby World Cup in France. The matches will be contested by the men's national teams of Australia, England, Fiji, France, Georgia, Ireland, Italy, Japan, Romania, Samoa, Scotland, South Africa and Wales.

== 29 July ==
29 July 2023
15:15

Scotland	25–13	Italy
Try: Graham (2) 13' m, 56' c Bayliss 80' c Con: Healy (2/3) 57', 80+1'; Pen: Healy (2) 48', 75'	Report	Try: Ioane 62' c Con: Allan (1/1) 63'; Pen: Allan (2) 27', 36'

Murrayfield Stadium, Edinburgh
Referee: Ben O'Keeffe (New Zealand)

FB	15	Ollie Smith
RW	14	Darcy Graham	(substituted off) 72'
OC	13	Chris Harris	(substituted off) 57'
IC	12	Stafford McDowall
LW	11	Kyle Steyn
FH	10	Ben Healy
SH	9	Ali Price	(substituted off) 58'
N8	8	Matt Fagerson
OF	7	Rory Darge (c)
BF	6	Luke Crosbie	(substituted off) 70'
RL	5	Scott Cummings	(substituted off) 65'
LL	4	Sam Skinner
TP	3	Murphy Walker	(substituted off) 47'
HK	2	George Turner	(substituted off) 46'
LP	1	Rory Sutherland	(substituted off) 40'
Replacements:
HK	16	Stuart McInally	(substituted on) 46'
PR	17	Jamie Bhatti	(substituted on) 40'
PR	18	Javan Sebastian	(substituted on) 47'
LK	19	Cameron Henderson	(substituted on) 65'
FL	20	Josh Bayliss	(substituted on) 70'
SH	21	Jamie Dobie	(substituted on) 58'
FH	22	Blair Kinghorn	(substituted on) 72'
CE	23	Cameron Redpath	(substituted on) 57'
Coach:
(Scotland) Gregor Townsend

FB	15	Lorenzo Pani
RW	14	Pierre Bruno	(substituted off) 52'
OC	13	Tommaso Menoncello
IC	12	Luca Morisi	(substituted off) 60'
LW	11	Monty Ioane
FH	10	Tommaso Allan
SH	9	Martin Page-Relo	(substituted off) 61'
N8	8	Toa Halafihi
OF	7	Manuel Zuliani	(substituted off) 52'
BF	6	Federico Ruzza (c)
RL	5	Andrea Zambonin
LL	4	Dave Sisi	(substituted off) 57'
TP	3	Pietro Ceccarelli	(substituted off) 60'
HK	2	Hame Faiva	(substituted off) 59'
LP	1	Federico Zani	(substituted off) 52'
Replacements:
HK	16	Marco Manfredi	(substituted on) 59'
PR	17	Danilo Fischetti	(substituted on) 52'
PR	18	Filippo Alongi	(substituted on) 60'
LK	19	Edoardo Iachizzi	(substituted on) 57'
N8	20	Lorenzo Cannone	(substituted on) 52'
SH	21	Alessandro Garbisi	(substituted on) 52'
FH	22	Giacomo Da Re	(substituted on) 61'
CE	23	Federico Mori	(substituted on) 60'
Coach:
(New Zealand) Kieran Crowley

Assistant referees:
Mathieu Raynal (France)
Adam Leal (England)
Television match official:
Ben Whitehouse (Wales)

== 5 August ==
5 August 2023
15:15

Scotland	25–21	France
Try: Graham 46' c Schoeman 57' c Cherry 67' m Con: Russell (2/3) 47', 58'; Pen: Russell (2/2) 4', 76'	Report	Try: Couilloud 12' c Bielle-Biarrey 25' c Woki 43' c Con: Jalibert (3/3) 13', 26', 44'

Murrayfield Stadium, Edinburgh
Referee: Ben O'Keeffe (New Zealand)

FB	15	Blair Kinghorn
RW	14	Darcy Graham
OC	13	Huw Jones
IC	12	Sione Tuipulotu		(substituted off) 61'
LW	11	Duhan van der Merwe
FH	10	Finn Russell (c)
SH	9	Ben White		(substituted off) 31'
N8	8	Jack Dempsey		(substituted off) 61'
OF	7	Hamish Watson		(substituted off) 61'
BF	6	Matt Fagerson
RL	5	Grant Gilchrist		(substituted off) 75'
LL	4	Richie Gray
TP	3	Zander Fagerson	(red card) 55'
HK	2	Ewan Ashman		(substituted off) 61'
LP	1	Pierre Schoeman		(substituted off) 61'
Replacements:
HK	16	Dave Cherry		(substituted on) 61'
PR	17	Jamie Bhatti		(substituted on) 61'
PR	18	WP Nel		(substituted on) 61'
LK	19	Scott Cummings		(substituted on) 75'
FL	20	Rory Darge		(substituted on) 61'
SH	21	George Horne		(substituted on) 31'
CE	22	Cameron Redpath		(substituted on) 61'
FB	23	Ollie Smith
Coach:
(Scotland) Gregor Townsend

FB	15	Brice Dulin (c)
RW	14	Louis Bielle-Biarrey
OC	13	Émilien Gailleton
IC	12	Yoram Moefana
LW	11	Ethan Dumortier	(substituted off) 61'
FH	10	Matthieu Jalibert	(substituted off) 64'
SH	9	Baptiste Couilloud	(substituted off) 72'
N8	8	Yoan Tanga
OF	7	Sekou Macalou	(substituted off) 58'
BF	6	Paul Boudehent
RL	5	Bastien Chalureau	(substituted off) 58'
LL	4	Cameron Woki
TP	3	Demba Bamba	(substituted off) 47'
HK	2	Pierre Bourgarit	(substituted off) 58'
LP	1	Jean-Baptiste Gros	(substituted off) 58'
Replacements:
HK	16	Peato Mauvaka	(substituted on) 58'
PR	17	Reda Wardi	(substituted on) 58'
PR	18	Sipili Falatea	(substituted on) 47'
LK	19	Paul Willemse	(substituted on) 58'
FL	20	Dylan Cretin	(substituted on) 58'
SH	21	Baptiste Serin	(substituted on) 72'
FH	22	Antoine Hastoy	(substituted on) 64'
CE	23	Arthur Vincent	(substituted on) 61'
Coach:
(France) Fabien Galthié

Assistant referees:
Frank Murphy (Ireland)
Federico Vedovelli (Italy)
Television match official:
Ben Whitehouse (Wales)

5 August 2023
17:30

Wales	20–9	England
Try: G. Davies 48' c North 58' c Con: Halfpenny (2/2) 49', 59'; Pen: Halfpenny (2/2) 17', 26'	Report	Pen: Smith (3/3) 8', 13', 43'

Millennium Stadium, Cardiff
Referee: Nic Berry (Australia)

FB	15	Leigh Halfpenny
RW	14	Louis Rees-Zammit
OC	13	George North
IC	12	Max Llewellyn
LW	11	Rio Dyer
FH	10	Sam Costelow	(substituted off) 55'
SH	9	Gareth Davies	(substituted off) 55'
N8	8	Aaron Wainwright
OF	7	Jac Morgan (c)
BF	6	Christ Tshiunza	(substituted off) 50'
RL	5	Will Rowlands	(substituted off) 50'
LL	4	Dafydd Jenkins	(substituted off) 60'
TP	3	Kieron Assiratti	(substituted off) 50'
HK	2	Ryan Elias	(substituted off) 6'
LP	1	Corey Domachowski	(substituted off) 50'
Replacements:
HK	16	Elliot Dee	(substituted on) 6'
PR	17	Nicky Smith	(substituted on) 50'
PR	18	Henry Thomas	(substituted on) 50'
LK	19	Ben Carter	(substituted on) 50'
FL	20	Taine Plumtree	(substituted on) 50'
SH	21	Tomos Williams	(substituted on) 55'
FH	22	Dan Biggar	(substituted on) 55'
CE	23	Mason Grady	(substituted on) 60'
Coach:
(New Zealand) Warren Gatland

FB	15	Freddie Steward
RW	14	Max Malins
OC	13	Joe Marchant
IC	12	Guy Porter
LW	11	Joe Cokanasiga	(substituted off) 69'
FH	10	Marcus Smith	(substituted off) 60'
SH	9	Danny Care	(substituted off) 50'
N8	8	Alex Dombrandt	(substituted off) 55'
OF	7	Tom Pearson
BF	6	Lewis Ludlam
RL	5	George Martin
LL	4	David Ribbans	(substituted off) 46'
TP	3	Will Stuart	(substituted off) 55'
HK	2	Jamie Blamire	(substituted off) 55'
LP	1	Ellis Genge (c)	(substituted off) 69'
Replacements:
HK	16	Theo Dan	(substituted on) 55'
PR	17	Bevan Rodd	(substituted on) 69'
PR	18	Kyle Sinckler	(substituted on) 55'
LK	19	Jonny Hill	(substituted on) 46'
FL	20	Tom Willis	(substituted on) 55'
SH	21	Jack van Poortvliet	(substituted on) 50'
FH	22	George Ford	(substituted on) 60'
CE	23	Henry Slade	(substituted on) 69'
Coach:
(England) Steve Borthwick

Assistant referees:
Mike Adamson (Scotland)
Andrea Piardi (Italy)
Television match official:
Joy Neville (Ireland)

5 August 2023
20:00

Ireland	33–17	Italy
Try: Kilcoyne 13' c Doris (2) 29' c, 73' c McCloskey 36' c Healy 65' m Con: Crowley (3/4) 14', 30', 37'; Frawley 74'	Report	Try: Pani 51' c Menoncello 69' c Con: Allan (2/2) 52', 70'; Pen: Allan (1/1) 3'

Aviva Stadium, Dublin
Referee: Mathieu Raynal (France)

FB	15	Jimmy O'Brien	(substituted off) 41'
RW	14	Keith Earls
OC	13	Robbie Henshaw	(substituted off) 62'
IC	12	Stuart McCloskey
LW	11	Jacob Stockdale
FH	10	Jack Crowley
SH	9	Craig Casey	(substituted off) 45'
N8	8	Jack Conan	(substituted off) 36'
OF	7	Caelan Doris
BF	6	Ryan Baird
RL	5	Joe McCarthy
LL	4	Iain Henderson	(substituted off) 56'
TP	3	Tom O'Toole	(substituted off) 52'
HK	2	Rob Herring	(substituted off) 52'
LP	1	Dave Kilcoyne	(substituted off) 52'
Replacements:
HK	16	Tom Stewart	(substituted on) 52'
PR	17	Cian Healy	(substituted on) 52'
PR	18	Tadhg Furlong	(substituted on) 52'
LK	19	Tadhg Beirne	(substituted on) 56'
FL	20	Cian Prendergast	(substituted on) 36'
SH	21	Caolin Blade	(substituted on) 45'
CE	22	Ciarán Frawley	(substituted on) 41'
WG	23	Calvin Nash	(substituted on) 62'
Coach:
(England) Andy Farrell

FB	15	Tommaso Allan
RW	14	Paolo Odogwu		(substituted off) 23'
OC	13	Ignacio Brex
IC	12	Tommaso Menoncello		(substituted off) 75'
LW	11	Monty Ioane
FH	10	Paolo Garbisi
SH	9	Stephen Varney		(substituted off) 41'
N8	8	Toa Halafihi
OF	7	Manuel Zuliani		(substituted off) 41'
BF	6	Sebastian Negri		(substituted off) 74'
RL	5	Federico Ruzza (c)
LL	4	Dino Lamb		(substituted off) 46'
TP	3	Marco Riccioni		(substituted off) 10'
HK	2	Giacomo Nicotera		(substituted off) 56'
LP	1	Danilo Fischetti	(yellow card) 28'				(substituted off) 60'
Replacements:
HK	16	Luca Bigi		(substituted on) 56'
PR	17	Paolo Buonfiglio			(substituted on) 36'	(substituted off) 39'	(substituted on) 60'
PR	18	Simone Ferrari		(substituted on) 10'
LK	19	Niccolò Cannone		(substituted on) 46'
FL	20	Michele Lamaro		(substituted on) 41'
N8	21	Lorenzo Cannone		(substituted on) 74'
SH	22	Alessandro Fusco		(substituted on) 41'
FB	23	Lorenzo Pani		(substituted on) 23'	(substituted off) 36'	(substituted on) 39'
Coach:
(New Zealand) Kieran Crowley

Assistant referees:
Pierre Brousset (France)
Luc Ramos (France)
Television match official:
Eric Gauzins (France)

== 12 August ==
12 August 2023
17:30

England	19–17	Wales
Try: Itoje 68' c Con: Ford 69'; Pen: Farrell (3) 10', 40+3', 42'; Ford 76'	Report	Try: Penalty try 59'; T. Williams 65' c Con: Biggar (1/1) 66'; Pen: O. Williams 46'

Twickenham Stadium, London
Referee: Nika Amashukeli (Georgia)

FB	15	Freddie Steward	(yellow card) 59'
RW	14	Henry Arundell	(yellow card) 32'	(substituted off) 57'
OC	13	Joe Marchant
IC	12	Ollie Lawrence		(substituted off) 72'
LW	11	Elliot Daly
FH	10	Owen Farrell (c)	(red card) 64'
SH	9	Jack van Poortvliet		(substituted off) 32'
N8	8	Billy Vunipola		(substituted off) 62'
OF	7	Ben Earl
BF	6	Courtney Lawes
RL	5	George Martin
LL	4	Maro Itoje
TP	3	Will Stuart		(substituted off) 57'
HK	2	Jamie George
LP	1	Joe Marler		(substituted off) 54'
Replacements:
HK	16	Theo Dan
PR	17	Ellis Genge	(yellow card) 58'	(substituted on) 54'
PR	18	Dan Cole		(substituted on) 57'
LK	19	Jonny Hill
FL	20	Jack Willis		(substituted on) 62'
SH	21	Ben Youngs		(substituted on) 32'
FH	22	George Ford		(substituted on) 57'
WG	23	Max Malins		(substituted on) 72'
Coach:
(England) Steve Borthwick

FB	15	Liam Williams
RW	14	Josh Adams
OC	13	Joe Roberts
IC	12	Nick Tompkins		(substituted off) 60'
LW	11	Tom Rogers
FH	10	Owen Williams		(substituted off) 50'
SH	9	Tomos Williams		(substituted off) 72'
N8	8	Taine Plumtree		(substituted off) 48'
OF	7	Tommy Reffell	(yellow card) 41'
BF	6	Dan Lydiate
RL	5	Adam Beard	(yellow card) 75'
LL	4	Rhys Davies		(substituted off) 50'	(substituted on) 64'
TP	3	Tomas Francis		(substituted off) 50'
HK	2	Dewi Lake (c)		(substituted off) 27'
LP	1	Gareth Thomas		(substituted off) 50'
Replacements:
HK	16	Sam Parry		(substituted on) 27'
PR	17	Kemsley Mathias		(substituted on) 50'
PR	18	Dillon Lewis		(substituted on) 50'
LK	19	Christ Tshiunza		(substituted on) 50'
FL	20	Taine Basham		(substituted on) 48'	(substituted off) 64'
SH	21	Kieran Hardy		(substituted on) 72'
FH	22	Dan Biggar		(substituted on) 50'
CE	23	Keiran Williams		(substituted on) 60'
Coach:
(New Zealand) Warren Gatland

Assistant referees:
Andrew Brace (Ireland)
Andrea Piardi (Italy)
Television match official:
Brian MacNeice (Ireland)

12 August 2023
20:05

France	30–27	Scotland
Try: Ntamack 32' c Penaud 42' c Ollivon 44' c Con: Ramos (3/3) 33', 43', 46'; Pen: Ramos (3/3) 8', 22', 79'	Report	Try: Steyn (2) 4' c, 73' m Van der Merwe 62' m Darge 68' c Con: Russell (2/4) 6', 69'; Pen: Russell (1/1) 11'

Stade Geoffroy-Guichard, Saint-Étienne
Referee: Nic Berry (Australia)

FB	15	Thomas Ramos
RW	14	Damian Penaud
OC	13	Gaël Fickou
IC	12	Jonathan Danty	(substituted off) 64'
LW	11	Gabin Villière
FH	10	Romain Ntamack	(substituted off) 56'
SH	9	Antoine Dupont	(substituted off) 69'
N8	8	Grégory Alldritt	(substituted off) 67'
OF	7	Charles Ollivon
BF	6	Paul Boudehent
RL	5	Thibaud Flament	(substituted off) 64'
LL	4	Cameron Woki
TP	3	Dorian Aldegheri	(substituted off) 50'
HK	2	Julien Marchand	(substituted off) 50'
LP	1	Cyril Baille	(substituted off) 49'
Replacements:
HK	16	Pierre Bourgarit	(substituted on) 50'
PR	17	Jean-Baptiste Gros	(substituted on) 49'
PR	18	Uini Atonio	(substituted on) 50'
LK	19	Florian Verhaeghe	(substituted on) 67'
LK	20	Bastien Chalureau	(substituted on) 64'
FL	21	Sekou Macalou	(substituted on) 64'
SH	22	Maxime Lucu	(substituted on) 69'
WG	23	Louis Bielle-Biarrey	(substituted on) 56'
Coach:
(France) Fabien Galthié

FB	15	Blair Kinghorn
RW	14	Kyle Steyn
OC	13	Huw Jones
IC	12	Sione Tuipulotu
LW	11	Duhan van der Merwe		(substituted off) 64'
FH	10	Finn Russell
SH	9	Ali Price	(yellow card) 28'	(substituted off) 55'
N8	8	Jack Dempsey		(substituted off) 75'
OF	7	Rory Darge
BF	6	Jamie Ritchie (c)
RL	5	Grant Gilchrist		(substituted off) 56'
LL	4	Richie Gray		(substituted off) 65'
TP	3	WP Nel		(substituted off) 56'
HK	2	George Turner		(substituted off) 55'
LP	1	Pierre Schoeman		(substituted off) 55'
Replacements:
HK	16	Stuart McInally		(substituted on) 55'
PR	17	Rory Sutherland		(substituted on) 55'
PR	18	Javan Sebastian		(substituted on) 56'
LK	19	Scott Cummings		(substituted on) 65'
FL	20	Sam Skinner		(substituted on) 56'
FL	21	Josh Bayliss		(substituted on) 75'
SH	22	George Horne		(substituted on) 55'
FB	23	Ollie Smith		(substituted on) 64'
Coach:
(Scotland) Gregor Townsend

Assistant referees:
Karl Dickson (England)
Adam Leal (England)
Television match official:
Tom Foley (England)

== 19 August ==
19 August 2023
15:15

Wales	16–52	South Africa
Try: Parry 72' c Con: Evans (1/1) 73'; Pen: Costelow (3/3) 9', 21', 25'	Report	Try: Marx 4' m Moodie (2) 22' c, 61' c Kriel (2) 35' m, 52' c Du Toit 59' c Willemse 69' c Con: Libbok (5/7) 24', 53', 60', 62', 70'

Millennium Stadium, Cardiff
Referee: Andrew Brace (Ireland)

FB	15	Cai Evans		(substituted off) 61'	(substituted on) 66'
RW	14	Tom Rogers
OC	13	Mason Grady		(substituted off) 53'	(substituted on) 71'
IC	12	Johnny Williams
LW	11	Rio Dyer	(yellow card) 34'		(substituted off) 71'
FH	10	Sam Costelow			(substituted off) 66'
SH	9	Kieran Hardy		(substituted off) 53'
N8	8	Aaron Wainwright		(substituted off) 55'
OF	7	Jac Morgan (c)
BF	6	Dan Lydiate
RL	5	Will Rowlands
LL	4	Ben Carter		(substituted off) 61'
TP	3	Kieron Assiratti		(substituted off) 49'
HK	2	Elliot Dee		(substituted off) 56'
LP	1	Corey Domachowski		(substituted off) 49'
Replacements:
HK	16	Sam Parry		(substituted on) 56'
PR	17	Nicky Smith		(substituted on) 49'
PR	18	Henry Thomas		(substituted on) 49'
LK	19	Teddy Williams	(yellow card) 70'	(substituted on) 61'
FL	20	Taine Basham		(substituted on) 55'
SH	21	Tomos Williams		(substituted on) 53'
CE	22	Max Llewellyn		(substituted on) 53'
WG	23	Louis Rees-Zammit		(substituted on) 61'
Coach:
(New Zealand) Warren Gatland

FB	15	Willie le Roux		(substituted off) 55'
RW	14	Canan Moodie
OC	13	Jesse Kriel
IC	12	Damian de Allende
LW	11	Cheslin Kolbe
FH	10	Manie Libbok
SH	9	Jaden Hendrikse		(substituted off) 62'
N8	8	Jasper Wiese		(substituted off) 50'
BF	7	Pieter-Steph du Toit
OF	6	Siya Kolisi		(substituted off) 41'
RL	5	RG Snyman
LL	4	Jean Kleyn		(substituted off) 50'
TP	3	Frans Malherbe		(substituted off) 47'
HK	2	Malcolm Marx		(substituted off) 47'
LP	1	Steven Kitshoff		(substituted off) 47'
Replacements:
HK	16	Bongi Mbonambi		(substituted on) 47'
PR	17	Ox Nché		(substituted on) 47'
PR	18	Vincent Koch		(substituted on) 47'
LK	19	Franco Mostert		(substituted on) 50'
FL	20	Marco van Staden		(substituted on) 41'
N8	21	Duane Vermeulen		(substituted on) 50'
SH	22	Grant Williams		(substituted on) 62'
FB	23	Damian Willemse	(yellow card) 71'	(substituted on) 55'
Coach:
(South Africa) Jacques Nienaber

Assistant referees:
Chris Busby (Ireland)
Eoghan Cross (Ireland)
Television match official:
Joy Neville (Ireland)

19 August 2023
17:30

Italy	57–7	Romania
Try: Odogwu 6' m Ioane 12' c A. Garbisi 16' c Capuozzo 20' m, 54' m Nicotera 27' c Brex 44' c Lamb 66' c Halafihi 72' c Con: P. Garbisi (6/9) 13', 17', 28', 44', 66', 73'	Report	Try: Penalty try 39'

Stadio Riviera delle Palme, San Benedetto del Tronto
Referee: Luke Pearce (England)

FB	15	Ange Capuozzo		(substituted off) 70'
RW	14	Paolo Odogwu		(substituted off) 56'
OC	13	Ignacio Brex
IC	12	Luca Morisi		(substituted off) 56'
LW	11	Monty Ioane		(substituted off) 49'	(substituted on) 62'
FH	10	Paolo Garbisi
SH	9	Alessandro Garbisi			(substituted off) 62'
N8	8	Toa Halafihi
OF	7	Michele Lamaro	(yellow card) 39'	(substituted off) 11'	(substituted on) 23'
BF	6	Sebastian Negri				(substituted off) 60'
RL	5	Dino Lamb
LL	4	Niccolò Cannone
TP	3	Simone Ferrari		(substituted off) 56'
HK	2	Giacomo Nicotera		(substituted off) 50'
LP	1	Ivan Nemer		(substituted off) 40'
Replacements:
HK	16	Hame Faiva		(substituted on) 50'
PR	17	Federico Zani		(substituted on) 40'
PR	18	Pietro Ceccarelli		(substituted on) 56'
LK	19	Federico Ruzza		(substituted on) 70'
FL	20	Lorenzo Cannone		(substituted on) 11'	(substituted off) 23'	(substituted on) 60'
SH	21	Alessandro Fusco		(substituted on) 49'
FH	22	Tommaso Allan		(substituted on) 56'
FB	23	Lorenzo Pani		(substituted on) 56'
Coach:
(New Zealand) Kieran Crowley

FB	15	Hinckley Vaovasa
RW	14	Marius Simionescu
OC	13	Jason Tomane		(substituted off) 57'
IC	12	Tevita Manumua
LW	11	Nicolas Onuțu		(substituted off) 46'
FH	10	Mihai Mureșan		(substituted off) 29'
SH	9	Alin Conache
N8	8	Cristi Chirică	(yellow card) 46'
OF	7	Vlad Neculau		(substituted off) 70'
BF	6	Damian Strătilă		(substituted off) 46'
RL	5	Ștefan Iancu
LL	4	Adrian Moțoc	(red card) 10'
TP	3	Alexandru Gordaș		(substituted off) 34'
HK	2	Ovidiu Cojocaru		(substituted off) 50'	(substituted on) 58'	(substituted off) 62'	(substituted on) 71'
LP	1	Iulian Harțig		(substituted off) 46'
Replacements:
HK	16	Florin Bărdașu		(substituted on) 50'	(substituted off) 58'	(substituted on) 62'	(substituted off) 71'
PR	17	Alexandru Savin		(substituted on) 46'
PR	18	Gheorghe Gajion		(substituted on) 34'
LK	19	Cristi Boboc		(substituted on) 46'
FL	20	Dragoș Ser		(substituted on) 70'
SH	21	Florin Surugiu		(substituted on) 57'
FH	22	Gabriel Pop		(substituted on) 46'
FH	23	Tudor Boldor		(substituted on) 29'
Coach:
(Romania) Eugen Apjok

Assistant referees:
Adam Leal (England)
Anthony Woodthorpe (England)
Television match official:
Ben Blain (Scotland)

19 August 2023
17:30

Ireland	29–10	England
Try: Aki 9' c Ringrose 39' m Lowe 55' m Hansen 65' m Earls 73' c Con: Byrne (1/4) 10'; Crowley (1/1) 75'	Report	Try: Sinckler 72' c Con: Ford (1/1) 72'; Pen: Ford (1/2) 5'

Aviva Stadium, Dublin
Referee: Paul Williams (New Zealand)

FB	15	Hugo Keenan
RW	14	Mack Hansen
OC	13	Garry Ringrose
IC	12	Bundee Aki	(substituted off) 59'	(substituted on) 70'
LW	11	James Lowe	(substituted off) 59'
FH	10	Ross Byrne		(substituted off) 70'
SH	9	Jamison Gibson-Park	(substituted off) 67'
N8	8	Cian Prendergast
OF	7	Josh van der Flier
BF	6	Peter O'Mahony	(substituted off) 54'
RL	5	James Ryan	(substituted off) 70'
LL	4	Tadhg Beirne
TP	3	Tadhg Furlong	(substituted off) 57'
HK	2	Dan Sheehan	(substituted off) 38'
LP	1	Andrew Porter	(substituted off) 73'
Replacements:
HK	16	Rob Herring	(substituted on) 38'
PR	17	Jeremy Loughman	(substituted on) 73'
PR	18	Finlay Bealham	(substituted on) 57'
LK	19	Joe McCarthy	(substituted on) 54'
FL	20	Caelan Doris	(substituted on) 70'
SH	21	Conor Murray	(substituted on) 67'
FH	22	Jack Crowley	(substituted on) 59'
WG	23	Keith Earls	(substituted on) 59'
Coach:
(England) Andy Farrell

FB	15	Freddie Steward
RW	14	Anthony Watson		(substituted off) 70'
OC	13	Joe Marchant
IC	12	Manu Tuilagi		(substituted off) 61'
LW	11	Elliot Daly
FH	10	George Ford
SH	9	Ben Youngs		(substituted off) 57'
N8	8	Billy Vunipola	(red card) 55'
OF	7	Ben Earl
BF	6	Courtney Lawes		(substituted off) 75'
RL	5	David Ribbans		(substituted off) 51'
LL	4	Maro Itoje
TP	3	Will Stuart		(substituted off) 45'
HK	2	Jamie George		(substituted off) 67'
LP	1	Ellis Genge		(substituted off) 57'
Replacements:
HK	16	Theo Dan		(substituted on) 67'
PR	17	Joe Marler		(substituted on) 57'
PR	18	Kyle Sinckler		(substituted on) 45'
LK	19	Ollie Chessum		(substituted on) 51'
FL	20	Jack Willis		(substituted on) 75'
SH	21	Danny Care		(substituted on) 57'
FH	22	Marcus Smith		(substituted on) 70'
CE	23	Ollie Lawrence		(substituted on) 61'
Coach:
(England) Steve Borthwick

Assistant referees:
Craig Evans (Wales)
Adam Jones (Wales)
Television match official:
Ben Whitehouse (Wales)

19 August 2023
20:05

France	34–17	Fiji
Try: Mauvaka 29' c Atonio 39' m Macalou 59' c Con: Jaminet (2/3) 30', 60'; Pen: Jaminet (5/5) 5', 7', 10', 42', 71'	Report	Try: Ikanivere 32' c Radradra 50' c Con: Muntz (2/2) 33', 51'; Pen: Muntz (1/1) 19'

Stade de la Beaujoire, Nantes
Referee: Nika Amashukeli (Georgia)

FB	15	Melvyn Jaminet
RW	14	Louis Bielle-Biarrey
OC	13	Arthur Vincent
IC	12	Jonathan Danty
LW	11	Yoram Moefana
FH	10	Antoine Hastoy	(substituted off) 62'
SH	9	Maxime Lucu	(substituted off) 62'
N8	8	Grégory Alldritt	(substituted off) 52'
OF	7	Dylan Cretin
BF	6	François Cros	(substituted off) 55'
RL	5	Paul Willemse	(substituted off) 62'
LL	4	Florian Verhaeghe	(substituted off) 62'
TP	3	Uini Atonio	(substituted off) 44'
HK	2	Peato Mauvaka
LP	1	Reda Wardi	(substituted off) 44'
Replacements:
HK	16	Pierre Bourgarit	(substituted on) 55'
PR	17	Jean-Baptiste Gros	(substituted on) 44'
PR	18	Thomas Laclayat	(substituted on) 44'
LK	19	Bastien Chalureau	(substituted on) 62'
LK	20	Thibaud Flament	(substituted on) 62'
FL	21	Sekou Macalou	(substituted on) 52'
SH	22	Baptiste Serin	(substituted on) 62'
FH	23	Matthieu Jalibert	(substituted on) 62'
Coach:
(France) Fabien Galthié

FB	15	Sireli Maqala	(substituted off) 66'
RW	14	Jiuta Wainiqolo	(substituted off) 72'
OC	13	Iosefo Masi	(substituted off) 41'
IC	12	Semi Radradra
LW	11	Vinaya Habosi
FH	10	Caleb Muntz
SH	9	Frank Lomani
N8	8	Viliame Mata
OF	7	Levani Botia	(substituted off) 74'
BF	6	Meli Derenalagi	(substituted off) 30'
RL	5	Isoa Nasilasila
LL	4	Te Ahiwaru Cirikidaveta
TP	3	Mesake Doge	(substituted off) 42'
HK	2	Tevita Ikanivere	(substituted off) 52'
LP	1	Eroni Mawi	(substituted off) 66'
Replacements:
HK	16	Sam Matavesi	(substituted on) 52'
PR	17	Jone Koroiduadua	(substituted on) 66'
PR	18	Luke Tagi	(substituted on) 42'
LK	19	Temo Mayanavanua	(substituted on) 74'
FL	20	Albert Tuisue	(substituted on) 30'
CE	21	Kalaveti Ravouvou	(substituted on) 66'
SH	22	Simione Kuruvoli	(substituted on) 72'
CE	23	Ilaisa Droasese	(substituted on) 41'
Coach:
(Fiji) Simon Raiwalui

Assistant referees:
Andrea Piardi (Italy)
Federico Vedovelli (Italy)
Television match official:
Ian Tempest (England)

== 26–27 August ==
26 August 2023
15:15

England	22–30	Fiji
Try: May 9' m Smith 57' c Marchant 68' c Con: Ford (2/3) 58', 69'; Pen: Ford (1/1) 6'	Report	Try: Nayacalevu 43' c Habosi 52' c Kuruvoli 72' c Con: Muntz (3/3) 44', 54', 74'; Pen: Muntz (3/3) 18', 56', 62'

Twickenham Stadium, London
Referee: Jaco Peyper (South Africa)

FB	15	Freddie Steward	(substituted off) 54'
RW	14	Max Malins
OC	13	Ollie Lawrence	(substituted off) 54'
IC	12	Manu Tuilagi
LW	11	Jonny May
FH	10	George Ford
SH	9	Alex Mitchell	(substituted off) 70'
N8	8	Ben Earl
OF	7	Jack Willis	(substituted off) 57'
BF	6	Courtney Lawes
RL	5	Ollie Chessum	(substituted off) 70'
LL	4	Maro Itoje
TP	3	Dan Cole	(substituted off) 70'
HK	2	Theo Dan	(substituted off) 74'
LP	1	Ellis Genge	(substituted off) 51'
Replacements:
HK	16	Jack Walker	(substituted on) 74'
PR	17	Joe Marler	(substituted on) 51'
PR	18	Will Stuart	(substituted on) 70'
LK	19	David Ribbans	(substituted on) 70'
FL	20	Lewis Ludlam	(substituted on) 57'
SH	21	Danny Care	(substituted on) 70'
FH	22	Marcus Smith	(substituted on) 54'
CE	23	Joe Marchant	(substituted on) 54'
Coach:
(England) Steve Borthwick

FB	15	Ilaisa Droasese
RW	14	Selestino Ravutaumada
OC	13	Waisea Nayacalevu		(substituted off) 75'
IC	12	Semi Radradra		(substituted off) 65'
LW	11	Vinaya Habosi
FH	10	Caleb Muntz
SH	9	Frank Lomani		(substituted off) 49'
N8	8	Viliame Mata		(substituted off) 78'
OF	7	Lekima Tagitagivalu		(substituted off) 40'	(substituted on) 49'	(substituted off) 62'
BF	6	Albert Tuisue		(substituted off) 52'	(substituted on) 65'
RL	5	Te Ahiwaru Cirikidaveta			(substituted off) 65'
LL	4	Isoa Nasilasila
TP	3	Luke Tagi		(substituted off) 70'
HK	2	Sam Matavesi
LP	1	Eroni Mawi	(yellow card) 39'			(substituted off) 62'
Replacements:
HK	16	Zuriel Togiatama		(substituted on) 78'
PR	17	Jone Koroiduadua		(substituted on) 40'	(substituted off) 49'	(substituted on) 62'
PR	18	Samu Tawake		(substituted on) 70'
LK	19	Temo Mayanavanua				(substituted on) 62'
FL	20	Vilive Miramira		(substituted on) 52'
SH	21	Simione Kuruvoli		(substituted on) 49'
FH	22	Teti Tela		(substituted on) 75'
CE	23	Kalaveti Ravouvou		(substituted on) 65'
Coach:
(Fiji) Simon Raiwalui

Assistant referees:
Pierre Brousset (France)
Hollie Davidson (Scotland)
Television match official:
Brian MacNeice (Ireland)

26 August 2023
17:30

Italy	42–21	Japan
Try: Varney 6' c Ioane (3) 21' c, 56' m, 77' c Page-Relo 80' c Con: Allan (4/5) 7', 23', 79', 81'; Pen: Allan (3/3) 37', 46', 65'	Report	Try: Naikabula 16' m Matsushima 52' m Riley 71' m Pen: Lee Seung-sin (2/3) 34', 42'

Stadio Comunale di Monigo, Treviso
Referee: Karl Dickson (England)

FB	15	Tommaso Allan
RW	14	Ange Capuozzo	(substituted off) 63'
OC	13	Ignacio Brex
IC	12	Luca Morisi
LW	11	Monty Ioane
FH	10	Paolo Garbisi
SH	9	Stephen Varney	(substituted off) 72'
N8	8	Lorenzo Cannone	(substituted off) 54'
OF	7	Michele Lamaro
BF	6	Sebastian Negri
RL	5	Federico Ruzza	(substituted off) 72'
LL	4	Niccolò Cannone	(substituted off) 54'
TP	3	Simone Ferrari	(substituted off) 54'
HK	2	Giacomo Nicotera	(substituted off) 29'	(substituted on) 42'	(substituted off) 68'
LP	1	Ivan Nemer	(substituted off) 29'
Replacements:
HK	16	Luca Bigi	(substituted on) 29'	(substituted off) 42'	(substituted on) 68'
PR	17	Danilo Fischetti	(substituted on) 29'
PR	18	Pietro Ceccarelli	(substituted on) 54'
LK	19	Dino Lamb	(substituted on) 54'
FL	20	Giovanni Pettinelli	(substituted on) 72'
FL	21	Manuel Zuliani	(substituted on) 54'
SH	22	Martin Page-Relo	(substituted on) 72'
WG	23	Paolo Odogwu	(substituted on) 63'
Coach:
(New Zealand) Kieran Crowley

FB	15	Kotaro Matsushima
RW	14	Semisi Masirewa
OC	13	Dylan Riley
IC	12	Tomoki Osada	(substituted off) 68'
LW	11	Jone Naikabula
FH	10	Lee Seung-sin	(substituted off) 42'
SH	9	Yutaka Nagare	(substituted off) 58'
N8	8	Kazuki Himeno
OF	7	Shota Fukui	(substituted off) 61'
BF	6	Michael Leitch
RL	5	Uwe Helu	(substituted off) 42'
LL	4	Jack Cornelsen
TP	3	Koo Ji-won	(substituted off) 54'
HK	2	Shōta Horie	(substituted off) 61'
LP	1	Craig Millar	(substituted off) 54'
Replacements:
HK	16	Atsushi Sakate	(substituted on) 61'
PR	17	Keita Inagaki	(substituted on) 54'
PR	18	Asaeli Ai Valu	(substituted on) 54'
LK	19	Amanaki Saumaki	(substituted on) 42'
FL	20	Ben Gunter	(substituted on) 61'
SH	21	Naoto Saitō	(substituted on) 58'
FH	22	Rikiya Matsuda	(substituted on) 42'
CE	23	Ryōto Nakamura	(substituted on) 68'
Coach:
(Japan) Jamie Joseph

Assistant referees:
Chris Busby (Ireland)
Anthony Woodthorpe (England)
Television match official:
Stuart Terheege (England)

26 August 2023
17:30

Scotland	33–6	Georgia
Try: Van der Merwe (2) 46' c, 78' m Darge 51' c Dempsey 59' c Steyn 68' c Con: Russell (2/2) 48', 52'; Healy (2/3) 60', 68'	Report	Pen: Matkava (2/2) 12', 21'

Murrayfield Stadium, Edinburgh
Referee: Mathieu Raynal (France)

FB	15	Ollie Smith
RW	14	Kyle Steyn
OC	13	Huw Jones	(substituted off) 60'
IC	12	Sione Tuipulotu
LW	11	Duhan van der Merwe
FH	10	Finn Russell	(substituted off) 52'
SH	9	Ben White	(substituted off) 53'
N8	8	Jack Dempsey
OF	7	Rory Darge	(substituted off) 52'
BF	6	Jamie Ritchie
RL	5	Grant Gilchrist
LL	4	Sam Skinner	(substituted off) 60'
TP	3	WP Nel	(substituted off) 52'
HK	2	Dave Cherry	(substituted off) 52'
LP	1	Jamie Bhatti	(substituted off) 52'
Replacements:
HK	16	Ewan Ashman	(substituted on) 52'
PR	17	Rory Sutherland	(substituted on) 52'
PR	18	Javan Sebastian	(substituted on) 52'
LK	19	Scott Cummings	(substituted on) 60'
FL	20	Matt Fagerson	(substituted on) 52'
SH	21	George Horne	(substituted on) 53'
FH	22	Ben Healy	(substituted on) 52'
CE	23	Chris Harris	(substituted on) 60'
Coach:
(Scotland) Gregor Townsend

FB	15	Davit Niniashvili
RW	14	Aka Tabutsadze
OC	13	Demur Tapladze	(substituted off) 52'
IC	12	Merab Sharikadze
LW	11	Mirian Modebadze
FH	10	Luka Matkava	(substituted off) 67'
SH	9	Vasil Lobzhanidze	(substituted off) 60'
N8	8	Tornike Jalaghonia
OF	7	Mikheil Gachechiladze
BF	6	Luka Ivanishvili	(substituted off) 75'
RL	5	Konstantin Mikautadze			(substituted off) 52'
LL	4	Lado Chachanidze	(substituted off) 40'	(substituted on) 41'
TP	3	Beka Gigashvili	(substituted off) 57'
HK	2	Shalva Mamukashvili	(substituted off) 38'
LP	1	Mikheil Nariashvili	(substituted off) 52'
Replacements:
HK	16	Tengiz Zamtaradze	(substituted on) 38'
PR	17	Guram Gogichashvili	(substituted on) 52'
PR	18	Guram Papidze	(substituted on) 57'
LK	19	Lasha Jaiani	(substituted on) 40'	(substituted off) 41'	(substituted on) 52'
FL	20	Sandro Mamamtavrishvili	(substituted on) 75'
SH	21	Gela Aprasidze	(substituted on) 60'
FH	22	Tedo Abzhandadze	(substituted on) 67'
CE	23	Giorgi Kveseladze	(substituted on) 52'
Coach:
(Georgia (country)) Levan Maisashvili

Assistant referees:
Tual Trainini (France)
Ludovic Cayre (France)
Television match official:
Thomas Charabas (France)

26 August 2023
19:45

Ireland	17–13	Samoa
Try: O'Brien 9' c Murray 51' m Herring 64' m Con: Crowley (1/3) 10'	Report	Try: Paia'aua 36' c Con: Sopoaga (1/1) 37'; Pen: Sopoaga (2/2) 42', 46'

Stade Jean-Dauger, Bayonne, France
Referee: Wayne Barnes (England)

FB	15	Jimmy O'Brien	(substituted off) 53'
RW	14	Mack Hansen
OC	13	Robbie Henshaw
IC	12	Stuart McCloskey
LW	11	Jacob Stockdale	(substituted off) 66'
FH	10	Jack Crowley
SH	9	Conor Murray	(substituted off) 72'
N8	8	Caelan Doris
OF	7	Josh van der Flier
BF	6	Ryan Baird	(substituted off) 60'
RL	5	Tadhg Beirne
LL	4	Iain Henderson	(substituted off) 60'
TP	3	Finlay Bealham	(substituted off) 62'
HK	2	Tom Stewart	(substituted off) 51'
LP	1	Cian Healy	(substituted off) 21'
Replacements:
HK	16	Rob Herring	(substituted on) 51'
PR	17	Jeremy Loughman	(substituted on) 21'
PR	18	Tom O'Toole	(substituted on) 62'
LK	19	James Ryan	(substituted on) 60'
FL	20	Peter O'Mahony	(substituted on) 60'
SH	21	Craig Casey	(substituted on) 72'
FH	22	Ross Byrne	(substituted on) 53'
CE	23	Garry Ringrose	(substituted on) 66'
Coach:
(England) Andy Farrell

FB	15	Duncan Paia'aua
RW	14	Ed Fidow	(substituted off) 51'
OC	13	UJ Seuteni
IC	12	Tumua Manu
LW	11	Nigel Ah Wong
FH	10	Lima Sopoaga
SH	9	Jonathan Taumateine	(substituted off) 68'
N8	8	Steve Luatua	(substituted off) 63'
OF	7	Fritz Lee
BF	6	Taleni Seu
RL	5	Theo McFarland
LL	4	Chris Vui	(substituted off) 41'
TP	3	Paul Alo-Emile	(substituted off) 47'
HK	2	Seilala Lam	(substituted off) 51'
LP	1	James Lay	(substituted off) 63'
Replacements:
HK	16	Sama Malolo	(substituted on) 51'
PR	17	Jordan Lay	(substituted on) 63'
PR	18	Michael Alaalatoa	(substituted on) 47'
LK	19	Miracle Faiʻilagi	(substituted on) 63'
FL	20	Jordan Taufua	(substituted on) 41'
SH	21	Ere Enari	(substituted on) 68'
FH	22	Christian Leali'ifano
CE	23	Neria Fomai	(substituted on) 51'
Coach:
(Samoa) Seilala Mapusua

Assistant referees:
Andrea Piardi (Italy)
Adam Leal (England)
Television match official:
Ben Blain (Scotland)

27 August 2023
16:45

France	41–17	Australia
Try: Danty 7' c Penaud (2) 56' c, 74' c Villière 64' m Con: Ramos (2/3) 8', 58'; Jaminet (1/1) 76'; Pen: Ramos (4/5) 25', 28', 36', 54'; Jaminet (1/1) 80+1'	Report	Try: Nawaqanitawase 13' m McReight 61' c Vunivalu 78' m Con: Gordon (1/3) 62'

Stade de France, Saint-Denis
Referee: Luke Pearce (England)

FB	15	Thomas Ramos	(substituted off) 69'
RW	14	Damian Penaud
OC	13	Gaël Fickou
IC	12	Jonathan Danty
LW	11	Gabin Villière
FH	10	Matthieu Jalibert
SH	9	Antoine Dupont	(substituted off) 60'
N8	8	Grégory Alldritt	(substituted off) 65'
OF	7	Charles Ollivon
BF	6	François Cros
RL	5	Paul Willemse	(substituted off) 48'
LL	4	Thibaud Flament	(substituted off) 48'
TP	3	Uini Atonio	(substituted off) 48'
HK	2	Julien Marchand	(substituted off) 48'
LP	1	Jean-Baptiste Gros	(substituted off) 48'
Replacements:
HK	16	Peato Mauvaka	(substituted on) 48'
PR	17	Sébastien Taofifénua	(substituted on) 48'
PR	18	Dorian Aldegheri	(substituted on) 48'
LK	19	Romain Taofifénua	(substituted on) 48'
FL	20	Cameron Woki	(substituted on) 48'
FL	21	Paul Boudehent	(substituted on) 65'
SH	22	Baptiste Couilloud	(substituted on) 60'
FB	23	Melvyn Jaminet	(substituted on) 69'
Coach:
(France) Fabien Galthié

FB	15	Andrew Kellaway				(substituted off) 77'
RW	14	Mark Nawaqanitawase
OC	13	Jordan Petaia
IC	12	Lalakai Foketi		(substituted off) 58'	(substituted on) 70'
LW	11	Suliasi Vunivalu	(yellow card) 52'
FH	10	Carter Gordon
SH	9	Tate McDermott		(substituted off) 72'
N8	8	Rob Valetini		(substituted off) 69'
OF	7	Fraser McReight
BF	6	Tom Hooper
RL	5	Will Skelton		(substituted off) 72'
LL	4	Richie Arnold		(substituted off) 62'
TP	3	Taniela Tupou		(substituted off) 69'
HK	2	Dave Porecki		(substituted off) 69'
LP	1	Angus Bell		(substituted off) 72'
Replacements:
HK	16	Matt Faessler		(substituted on) 69'
PR	17	Blake Schoupp		(substituted on) 72'
PR	18	Zane Nonggorr		(substituted on) 69'
LK	19	Matt Philip		(substituted on) 72'
FL	20	Rob Leota		(substituted on) 62'
FL	21	Langi Gleeson		(substituted on) 69'
SH	22	Issak Fines-Leleiwasa		(substituted on) 72'
FH	23	Ben Donaldson		(substituted on) 58'	(substituted off) 70'	(substituted on) 77'
Coach:
(Australia) Eddie Jones

Assistant referees:
Christophe Ridley (England)
Craig Evans (Wales)
Television match official:
Tom Foley (England)
