= The Big Game (rugby union) =

Annual rugby union match in London

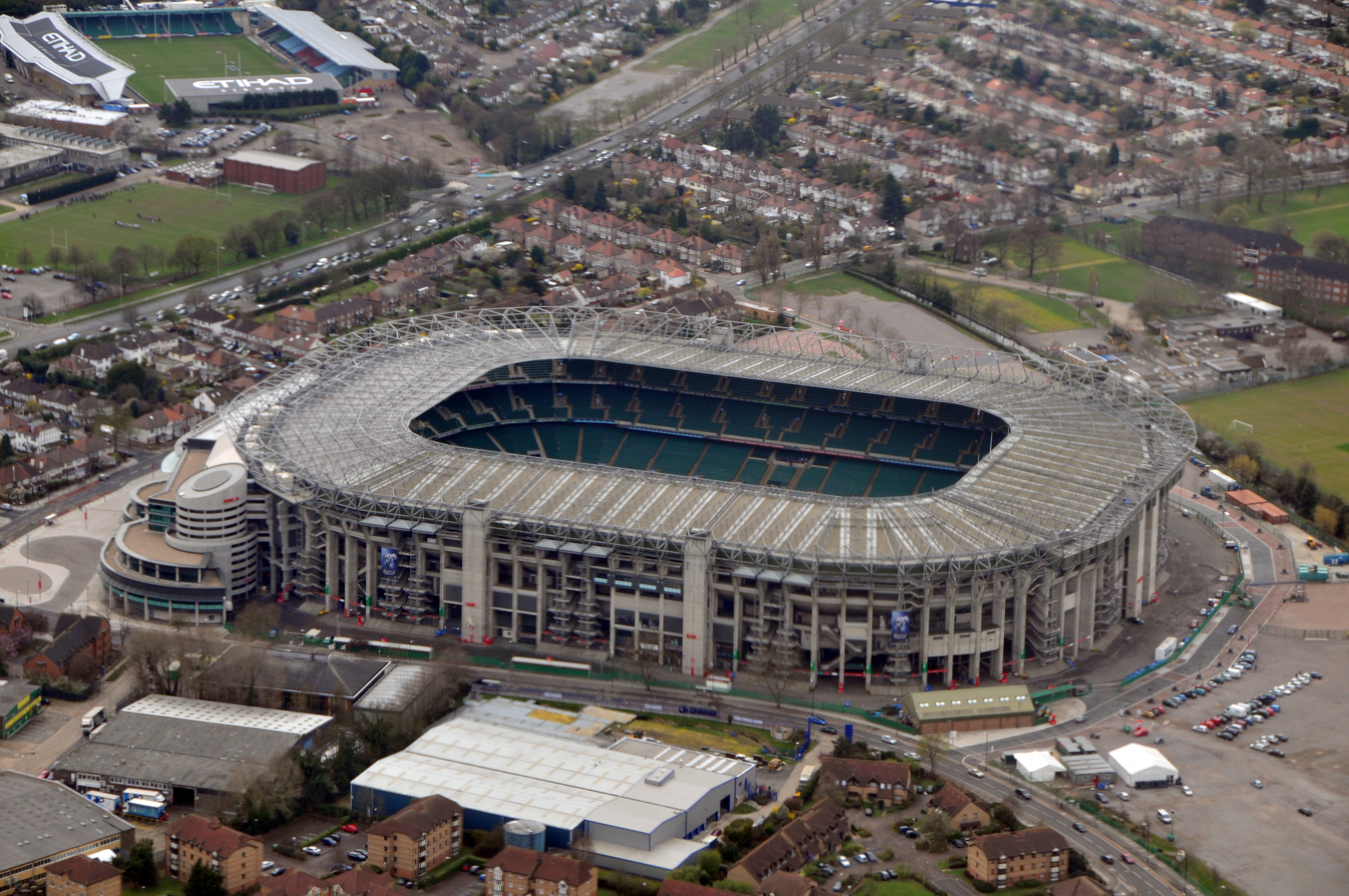
An aerial view of Twickenham Stadium. The Stoop can be seen in the top left-hand corner.

The Big Game is an annual rugby union match hosted by Harlequins since 2008 and Harlequins Women since 2021. It is held during the Christmas holiday season each year. It is one of the regular home matches in Premiership Rugby for the men's team and in Premiership Women's Rugby for the women's team. The fixture is moved from their usual home ground at the Twickenham Stoop (with a capacity of 14,816) to the much larger Twickenham Stadium (with 82,000 seats).

There have been other high-profile matches in London between Premiership Rugby clubs at other times, including the London Double Header (2004–2017), Bath's The Clash at Twickenham and Saracens' games at Wembley Stadium, London Stadium and Tottenham Hotspur Stadium.

Since 2022 Harlequins have also hosted an additional match at Twickenham near the end of the season known as Big Summer Kick-off.

== Big Game 1 ==
27 December 2008
16:00

Harlequins	26 – 26	Leicester Tigers
Try: Brown; Monye; Con: Evans (2/2); Pen: Evans (4)	Report	Try: Murphy; Croft; Con: Flood (2/2); Pen: Flood (4)

Twickenham Stadium
Attendance: 50,000
Referee: Dave Pearson (RFU)

== Big Game 2 ==
27 December 2009
16:15

Harlequins	20 – 21	London Wasps
Try: Care 68' c Strettle 79' c Con: Evans (2/2); Pen: Evans (2) 13', 18'	Report	Try: Simpson 2' m Hart 74' c Con: Walder (1/1); Pen: Cipriani (2) 23', 35'; Walder (1) 62'

Twickenham Stadium
Attendance: 76,716
Referee: Dave Pearson (RFU)

- Big Game 2 set a record Premiership attendance of 76,716.

== Big Game 3 ==
27 December 2010
16:30

Harlequins	28 – 18	London Irish
Try: Lowe 69' c Con: Evans (1/1); Pen: Evans (7) 6', 14', 20', 26', 36', 40', 54'	Report	Pen: Malone (6) 13', 18', 29', 38', 47', 59'

Twickenham Stadium
Attendance: 74,212
Referee: Andrew Small (RFU)

== Big Game 4 ==
27 December 2011
16:30

Harlequins	11 – 19	Saracens
Try: Marler 47' m Pen: Evans (2) 18', 40'	Report	Try: Strettle 19' c Con: Farrell (1/1); Pen: Farrell (4) 8', 10', 13', 24'

Twickenham Stadium
Attendance: 82,000
Referee: Wayne Barnes (RFU)

- Going into the game Harlequins had won all of their Premiership games, but fell to defeat in this their eleventh game to the team second in the table. As Twickenham had a capacity 82,000 crowd this game set a global rugby union attendance record for a regular-season club fixture.

== Big Game 5 ==
29 December 2012
14:15

Harlequins	26 – 15	London Irish
Try: Care 51' c Penalty try 77' c Con: Evans (2/2); Pen: Evans (4) 6', 22', 42', 57'	Report	Pen: Humphreys (5) 12', 24', 48', 55', 61'

Twickenham Stadium
Attendance: 82,000
Referee: Greg Garner (RFU)

== Big Game 6 ==
28 December 2013
15:00

Harlequins	22 – 6	Exeter Chiefs
Try: Evans 2' c Walker 31' m Brown 39' c Con: Evans (2/3) 3', 40'; Pen: Evans (1/3) 62'	Report	Pen: Steenson (2/2) 7', 43'

Twickenham Stadium
Attendance: 74,827
Referee: JP Doyle (RFU)

== Big Game 7 ==
27 December 2014
16:30

(1 BP) Harlequins	25 – 30	Northampton Saints
Try: Lowe 5' m Clifford 59' c Twomey 76' c Con: Swiel (2/3); Pen: Swiel (2/3) 9', 52'	Report	Try: Manoa 18' c North 42' c Fotuali'i 71' c Con: Myler (3/3); Pen: Myler (3/3) 11', 37', 54'

Twickenham Stadium
Attendance: 82,000
Referee: Wayne Barnes

== Big Game 8 ==
27 December 2015
16:30

(1 BP) Harlequins	39 – 39	Gloucester (1 BP)
Try: Yarde 15' m Care 34' c Easter 52' c R. Chisholm (2) 54' c, 76' c Con: N. Evans (4/5); Pen: N. Evans (2/2) 12', 70'	Report	Try: Thrush 6' c Hook 30' c Trinder (2) 47' c, 56' m Cook 68' c Con: Laidlaw (4/5); Pen: Laidlaw (2/3) 20', 60'

Twickenham Stadium
Attendance: 70,718
Referee: Wayne Barnes

== Big Game 9 ==
27 December 2016
16:00

Harlequins	28 – 24	Gloucester
Try: Marchant (2) 26' m, 58' c Clifford 41' c Con: Jackson (2/3); Pen: Jackson (3/3) 37', 40', 50'	Report	Try: Evans 48' c Hook 62' c Matu'u 70' c Con: Laidlaw (2/2); Burns (1/1)

Twickenham Stadium
Attendance: 77,567
Referee: JP Doyle

== Big Game 10 ==
30 December 2017
16:00

(1 BP) Harlequins	50 – 21	Northampton Saints
Try: Ward 10' c Walker 18' c Visser (2) 20' c, 42' m Care (2) 30' c, 56' c Luamanu 67' c Con: M. Smith (6/7) 11', 18', 21', 31', 57', 68'; Pen: M. Smith (1/1) 16'	Report	Try: Horne 47' c Groom 52' c Haywood 72' c Con: Myler (3/3) 47', 54', 73'

Twickenham Stadium
Attendance: 77,825
Referee: JP Doyle

== Big Game 11 ==
29 December 2018
16:00

Harlequins	20 – 13	Wasps
Try: Dombrandt 0' c Marchant 63' c Con: M. Smith (2/2) 2', 64'; Pen: M. Smith (2/2) 18', 37'	report	Try: Stuart 57' c Con: Sopoaga (1/1) 58'; Pen: Daly (1/1) 31'; Sopoaga (1/2) 68'

Twickenham Stadium
Attendance: 82,000
Referee: Craig Maxwell-Keys

== Big Game 12 ==
=== Men's fixture ===
28 December 2019
16:30

Harlequins	30–30	Leicester Tigers
Try: Lasike 28' c M. Smith 48' c Robshaw 54' c Con: M. Smith (3/3) 29', 49', 55'; Pen: M. Smith (3/3) 3', 35', 63'	Report	Try: Eastmond 43' c Taufua 60' c Veainu 72' c Con: Ford (3/3) 44', 61', 73'; Pen: Ford (3/3) 7', 24', 65'

Twickenham Stadium
Attendance: 75,500
Referee: Matthew Carley

=== Women's friendly ===
28 December 2019
19:00

Harlequins Women	47–26	Leinster Women

Twickenham Stadium
Attendance: 7,600

== Big Game 13 ==
Pending developments with the COVID-19 pandemic, Big Game 13 was planned to be held in spring 2021. The game never came to fruition and Harlequins would instead return to Twickenham twice the following season. Big Game 13 was the first time that Harlequins Women had played a Premier 15s match at Twickenham Stadium.

=== Women's fixture ===
27 December 2021
13:00

(1 BP) Harlequins Women	29 – 5	Wasps Women
Try: Breach 37' c Kildunne 43' m Cowell 47' c Konkel 63' m Fletcher 78' c Con: Tuima (2) 38', 48'	Report	Try: Boatman 40' +1 m

Twickenham
Attendance: 9,000
Referee: Nikki O'Donnell

=== Men's fixture ===
27 December 2021
17:00

(1 BP) Harlequins	41 – 27	Northampton Saints
Try: Dombrandt (3) 6' c, 40' m, 79' c Murley (2) 17' c, 30' c Lynagh 54' m Con: Edwards (3/5) 7', 18', 31'; Esterhuizen (1/1) 80'; Pen: Edwards (1/1) 72'		Try: Augustus (2) 2' c, 9' c A. Waller 14' c Con: Biggar (3/3) 3', 10', 15'; Pen: Biggar (2/2) 33', 44'

Twickenham Stadium
Attendance: 72,785
Referee: Wayne Barnes

== Big Game 14 ==
Harlequins intended to play Big Game 14 during the normal festive period. However, due to industrial action they were forced to play their festive fixture against Bristol Bears at Twickenham Stoop and would instead move their round 19 match against Exeter Chiefs to Twickenham. They would return to Twickenham the following month for their annual 'Big Summer Kick-Off' match

=== Women's fixture ===
4 March 2023
14:30

Harlequins Women	25 – 54	Exeter Chiefs Women (1 BP)
Try: Packer 24' c Dow 43' m Sims 62' c Con: McKenzie 25'; Tuima 63'; Pen: McKenzie (2) 22', 34'	Report	Try: Zackary (2) 3' c, 76' c Allen 13' c Johnson 36' c Jefferies 46' c MacDonald (2) 58' c, 68' m McGillivray 74' c Con: McGoverne (7) 4', 14', 37', 47', 59', 75', 77'

Twickenham
Attendance: 15,420
Referee: Dan Jones

=== Men's fixture ===
4 March 2023
17:30

Harlequins	40 - 5	Exeter Chiefs
Try: Murley 11' c Bassett 23' c Riley 29' m Marchant (2) 32' c, 57' c Lewies 65' c Con: M. Smith (5/6) 12', 24', 33', 59', 66'		Try: Innard 46' m

Twickenham Stadium
Attendance: 54,669
Referee: Matthew Carley

== Big Game 15 ==
=== Women's fixture ===
30 December 2023
14:30

Harlequins Women	19 – 31	Gloucester–Hartpury (1 BP)
Try: Sims 33' c Scott 42' m Latsha 56' c Con: Tuima (2/3) 34', 57'	Report	Try: H. Jones 3' c Monaghan 13' c Venner 22' m Tuipulotu 27' c Lund 80' m Con: Sing (3/5) 4', 14', 28'

Twickenham
Attendance: 16,237
Referee: George Selwood

=== Men's fixture ===
30 December 2023
17:30

(1 BP) Harlequins	32–26	Gloucester (2 BP)
Try: David (2) 7' m, 19' m Dombrandt 23' m Lamb 43' c Care 54' c Con: M. Smith (2/5) 44', 55'; Drop: M. Smith (1/1) 70'	Report	Try: Hastings 11' c McGuigan 51' c May 71' m Penalty try 77'; Con: Hastings (2/3) 13', 52'

Twickenham Stadium
Referee: Adam Leal

== Big Game 16 ==
This would be the first Big Game in the remamed "Allianz Stadium".

=== Women's Fixture ===
28 December 2024
15:00 GMT

Harlequins Women F.C.	42 - 17	Leicester Tigers Women
Try: Hidalgo (2) 10', 39'; C. Powell 19'; K. Powell 28'; Neumann 32'; Phillips 60'; Kildunne (2) 65', 71'; Con: Tuima (1/8) 29'	Report	Try: Jones 6'; Henrich 56'; Sanele 74'; Con: Jones (1/3) 7'

Allianz Stadium, Twickenham
Referee: Holly Wood

=== Men's fixture ===
28 December 2024
18:00 GMT

Harlequins	34-34	Leicester Tigers

Allianz Stadium, Twickenham
