= London Double Header =

English rugby union competition

The London Double Header ran between 2004 and 2017 and typically opened the season of Premiership Rugby (currently known as the Gallagher Premiership due to sponsorship), the top rugby union league in England.

Two games were played consecutively at Twickenham Stadium, originally involving the 'big four' London origin teams of the Premiership, Harlequins, London Irish, Saracens and Wasps (London Wasps until the 2014–15 season). Harlequins were relegated from the premiership at the end of the 2004–05 season and thus for the 2005–06 season Leeds Tykes were included instead. The same applied to London Irish in 2016 who were replaced. The matches form part of the regular season fixtures, with one team nominated as the home side for each match. Since 2008 (2016 being an exception) and the inception of The Big Game, Harlequins only compete in the double-header as an away side in order to reduce the number of home games they play away from Twickenham Stoop.

From 2015 and following Wasps' relocation to Coventry, the direction of the series changed. Two London teams (normally London Irish and Saracens) acted as the hosts, with the away teams being any of the other 10 Premiership Rugby teams. In 2016, Harlequins hosted due to London Irish's relegation from the premiership. In 2015, 2016 and 2017 the series featured a newly promoted team. The Double Header did not take place in 2018 due to redevelopment works at Twickenham Stadium and has not returned.

At other times of year Twickenham is also used for regular season Premiership fixtures, such as The Big Game hosted by Harlequins at Christmas time, The Clash hosted by Bath and the Premiership Final in June, as well as international fixtures including those by the Barbarians, plus inter-armed forces and varsity matches.

== 2004 ==
4 September 2004
14:00

London Irish	18–12	Harlequins
	Report

Twickenham Stadium
Attendance: 51,000
Referee: Wayne Barnes

4 September 2004
16:15

Saracens	13–11	London Wasps
	Report

Twickenham Stadium
Attendance: 51,000

== 2005 ==
3 September 2005
14:00

London Wasps	23–11	Saracens
	Report

Twickenham Stadium
Attendance: 35,000

3 September 2005
16:20

Leeds Tykes	11–27	London Irish
	Report

Twickenham Stadium
Attendance: 35,000
Referee: Sean Davey

== 2006 ==
2 September 2006
14:00

London Irish	20–19	NEC Harlequins
	Report

Twickenham Stadium
Attendance: 51,960

2 September 2006
16:20

Saracens	19–21	London Wasps
	Report

Twickenham Stadium
Attendance: 51,960
Referee: Roy Maybank

== 2007 ==
15 September 2007
15:30

Harlequins	35–27	London Irish
	Report

Twickenham Stadium
Attendance: 39,400
Referee: Ashley Rowden

15 September 2007
18:00

London Wasps	19–29	Saracens
	Report

Twickenham Stadium
Attendance: 39,400
Referee: Sean Davey

== 2008 ==
6 September 2008
14:30

London Irish	26–14	London Wasps
	Report

Twickenham Stadium
Attendance: 52,087
Referee: Andrew Small

6 September 2008
17:00

Saracens	21–24	Harlequins
	Report

Twickenham Stadium
Attendance: 52,087
Referee: Wayne Barnes

== 2009 ==
5 September 2009
14:30

Saracens	18–14	London Irish
Try: Jackson; Saull; Con: Jackson; Pen: Jackson (2)	Report	Try: Stowers; Pen: Lamb (2); D. Armitage

Twickenham Stadium
Attendance: 67,684
Referee: Dave Pearson

5 September 2009
17:15

London Wasps	26–15	Harlequins
Try: Varndell (2); Con: Van Gisbergen; Pen: Van Gisbergen 3	Report	Try: Monye; Camacho; Con: Evans; Pen: Evans

Twickenham Stadium
Attendance: 67,684
Referee: Dean Richards

== 2010 ==
4 September 2010
14:00

London Irish	33–16	Saracens
	Report

Twickenham Stadium
Attendance: 75,112
Referee: Andrew Small

4 September 2010
16:30

London Wasps	29–29	Harlequins
	Report

Twickenham Stadium
Attendance: 75,112
Referee: Chris White

== 2011 ==
3 September 2011
14:00

London Irish	24–29	Harlequins
	Report

Twickenham Stadium
Attendance: 55,437
Referee: Greg Garner

3 September 2011
16:30

Saracens	15–20	London Wasps
	Report

Twickenham Stadium
Attendance: 55,437
Referee: JP Doyle

== 2012 ==
1 September 2012
14:00

London Wasps	40–42	Harlequins
	Report

Twickenham Stadium
Attendance: 63,102
Referee: Greg Garner

1 September 2012
16:30

Saracens	40–3	London Irish
	Report

Twickenham Stadium
Attendance: 63,102
Referee: Wayne Barnes

== 2013 ==
7 September 2013
14:00

London Irish	20–42	(BP) Saracens
Try: Low 37' c Yarde 69' c Con: Humphreys (2/2); Pen: Humphreys (2) 13', 62'	Report	Try: George (2) 9' c, 35' m Vunipola 63' c Ashton 81' m Con: Farrell (2/4); Pen: Farrell (6) 4', 27', 39', 41', 51', 72'

Twickenham Stadium
Attendance: 62,637
Referee: Greg Garner

7 September 2013
16:30

London Wasps (BP)	15–16	Harlequins
Try: Launchbury 0' c Palmer 80' m Con: Goode (1/2); Pen: Goode (1) 13'	Report	Try: Dickson 70' c Con: Evans (1/1); Pen: Evans (3) 12', 45', 49'

Twickenham Stadium
Attendance: 62,637
Referee: Tim Wigglesworth

== 2014 ==
6 September 2014
14:00

Saracens (BP)	34–28	(BP) Wasps
Try: Ashton 6' c Strettle (3) 20' c, 62' c, 78' c Con: Hodgson (2/2); Farrell (2/2); Pen: Hodgson (2/3) 13', 18'	Report	Try: Hughes 43' c Wade (2) 53' m, 59' c Con: Goode (2/3); Pen: Goode (3/3) 10', 16', 26'

Twickenham Stadium
Attendance: 66,164
Referee: Andrew Small

6 September 2014
16:30

London Irish (BP)	15–20	Harlequins
Pen: Geraghty (5/6) 24', 33', 42', 54', 66'	Report	Try: Monye 10' c Lindsay-Hague 34' c Con: Evans (2/2); Pen: Evans (2/6) 7', 27'

Twickenham Stadium
Attendance: 66,164
Referee: Greg Garner

== 2015 ==
The 2015 London Double Header was moved from its traditional Round 1 position, to Round 5, in order to accommodate the 2015 Rugby World Cup knock-out stage matches being played at Twickenham Stadium. It was also the first time since 2005 that Saracens, Harlequins, London Irish and Wasps have not all taken part in the event. Harlequins chose not to take part due to the proximity of The Big Game 8 and were therefore replaced by Worcester Warriors. There had been suggestions that Wasps would not take part, following their move to the Ricoh Arena, however they were announced as one of the away teams for the event at the fixture launch on 3 July 2015.

28 November 2015
15:15

Saracens (BP)	48–18	Worcester Warriors
Try: Ashton (2) 3' c, 51' c Spencer 21' c Wray 43' c Brits 55' c Ransom 62' c Con: Hodgson (6/6); Pen: Hodgson (2/3) 30', 39'	Report	Try: Rees 70' m Van Velze 79' c Con: Heathcote (1/2); Pen: Heathcote (2/3) 33', 37'

Twickenham Stadium
Attendance: 42,680
Referee: Ian Tempest

28 November 2015
17:30

London Irish	15–33	(BP) Wasps
Try: Williams (2) 40' m, 56' c Con: Noakes (1/2); Pen: Noakes (1/3) 7'	Report	Try: Halai (2) 37' m, 74' m Daly 49' c Young 70' c Con: Jackson (1/2); Gopperth (1/2); Pen: Jackson (2/4) 4', 18'; Gopperth (1/1) 54'

Twickenham Stadium
Attendance: 42,680
Referee: Wayne Barnes

== 2016 ==
The 2016 London Double Header returned to its traditional Round 1 position. London Irish had been relegated from the Premiership and therefore did not take part. Home teams were confirmed on 28 June, with away teams confirmed at fixture launch on 7 July.

3 September 2016
14:00

(1 BP) Saracens	35–3	Worcester Warriors
Try: George 44' c Lozowski 53' c Burger 56' c Spencer 78' m Con: Lozowski (3/4) 44', 53' 56'; Pen: Lozowski (3/5) 15', 40', 42'	Report	Pen: Lamb (1/1) 25'

Twickenham Stadium
Attendance: 47,029
Referee: Matthew Carley

3 September 2016
16:30

Harlequins	21–19	Bristol (1 BP)
Try: Yarde 39' m Marchant 41' c Con: N. Evans (1/2) 41'; Pen: N. Evans (3/3) 24', 58', 65'	Report	Try: Varndell 21' c T. Pisi 27' c Edwards 42' m Con: Henson (2/2) 21', 27'

Twickenham Stadium
Attendance: 47,029
Referee: Luke Pearce

== 2017 ==
The 2017 London Double Header took place in its traditional Round 1 position. London Irish return after being promoted back into the Premiership. Home teams were confirmed on 22 June, with the away teams confirmed at the Premiership fixture launch on 7 July.

2 September 2017
14:00

(BP) Saracens	55–24	Northampton Saints
Try: Barritt 8' m Wigglesworth 11' c Maitland (3) 20' m, 31' m, 34' m Lozowski 28' c Koch 37' c Brits 51' c Spencer 67' c Con: Lozowski (5/9) 12', 29', 38', 52', 68'	Report	Try: Ludlam 43' c Wood (2) 55' c, 64' c Con: Mallinder (3/3) 44', 56', 64'; Pen: Mallinder (1/2) 24'

Twickenham Stadium
Attendance: 56,532
Referee: Craig Maxwell-Keys

2 September 2017
16:45

(BP) London Irish	39–29	Harlequins (BP)
Try: Ojo 23' c Bell 30' m Treviranus 56' m McKibbin 78' c Con: Bell (2/4) 24', 79'; Pen: Bell (5/6) 4', 7', 37', 52', 75'	Report	Try: Marchant 34' c Yarde 63' c Care 72' m Walker 77' c Con: M. Smith (1/1) 34'; Catrakilis (2/3) 64', 77'; Pen: M. Smith (1/1) 15'

Twickenham Stadium
Attendance: 56,532
Referee: Tom Foley
