= Manyika (surname) =

Manyika is a surname. Notable people with the surname include:

- Elliot Manyika, Zimbabwean politician
- James Manyika, Zimbabwean-American academic and business executive
- Ryan Manyika, Zimbabwean-British rugby union player
- Zeke Manyika, Zimbabwean-British drummer, vocalist and songwriter

== See also ==
- Manyika people
