= St Joseph's Rugby Festival =

UK rugby union competition

The St Joseph's College, Ipswich National Schoolboy Rugby Festival is a schools rugby union competition in the UK.

The Festival was started in 1987 to commemorate the Golden Jubilee of the College. Schools invited to take part come from both the state and independent sectors. The Festival has a record of featuring future England players, including former captain Chris Robshaw, British and Irish Lion Mako Vunipola, Charlie Sharples, Mike Tindall, Jonathan Joseph, Zach Mercer and most recently Marcus Smith, who won player of the tournament for Brighton College in 2016.

16 school teams, including hosts St Joseph's, compete in a 2 day competition. On day 1, 4 groups of 4, drawn randomly, play each other. On day 2, the top 2 from each group enter the De La Salle Cup and the bottom 2 enter the plate competition.

Past De La Salle winners include John Fisher School, Millfield, Brighton College and St Joseph's College.

== De La Salle Trophy winners ==
Year	Winner	Player of the tournament	Ref
1987	Downside School		
1988	Bradford Grammar School		
1989	AKS Lytham		
1990	Millfield		
1991	Bradford Grammar School		
1992	Bradford Grammar School		
1993	Millfield		
1994	Collegiate School		
1995	St Joseph's College		
1996	Collegiate School		
1997	Queen Elizabeth Grammar School, Wakefield	Andy Goode (England), Bromsgrove School	
1998	Collegiate School		
1999	RGS High Wycombe		
2000	Blackrock College		
2001	Collegiate School		
2002	Collegiate School	Sean Crowley, Millfield	
2003	Collegiate School	Olly Morgan (England), Millfield	
2004	Millfield		
2005	SGS College		
2006	Millfield	Ryan Manyika, Brighton College	
2007	SGS College	Luke Plummer, Filton College	
2008	SGS College	Jonathan Joseph (England), Millfield	
2009	John Fisher School	Chris Smart, Bedford School	
2010	St Joseph's College	Alex Day, St Joseph's College	
2011	Dulwich College	Max Northcote-Green, Millfield	
2012	Millfield	Sam Denham, Millfield	
2013	St Joseph's College	Dan Lewis; Lewis Ludlam (England), St Joseph's College	
2014	Millfield	Zach Mercer (England), Merchiston Castle School	
2015	Northampton School for Boys	Roman Malin-Hiscock, Hampton School	
2016	Cranleigh School	Marcus Smith (England), Brighton College	
2017	Brighton College	Toby Smith, Brighton College	
2018	RGS Newcastle	Dan John, Millfield	
2019	Wellington College	Phil Brantingham, RGS Newcastle	
2020	No competition (due to COVID-19 pandemic)		
2021	Millfield		
2022	Millfield		
2023	Kirkham Grammar School	Ollie Davis, Kirkham Grammar School	
2024	St Michael's College, Dublin		
2025	Wellington College	Charlie Bray, Kirkham Grammar School	
2026	Cheltenham College		

== Results by school ==
School	Wins	Year
Millfield School	8	1990, 1993, 2004, 2006, 2012, 2014, 2021, 2022
Collegiate School	6	1994, 1996, 1998, 2001, 2002, 2003
Bradford Grammar School	3	1988, 1991, 1992
SGS College	3	2005, 2007, 2008
St Joseph's College	3	1995, 2010, 2013
Wellington College	2	2019, 2025
AKS Lytham	1	1989
Blackrock College	1	2000
Brighton College	1	2017
Cheltenham College	1	2026
Cranleigh School	1	2016
Downside School	1	1987
Dulwich College	1	2011
John Fisher School	1	2009
Kirkham Grammar School	1	2023
Northampton School for Boys	1	2015
QEGS Wakefield	1	1997
RGS High Wycombe	1	1999
RGS Newcastle	1	2018
St Michael's College, Dublin	1	2024
