= Dino Lamb =

Italy international rugby union player

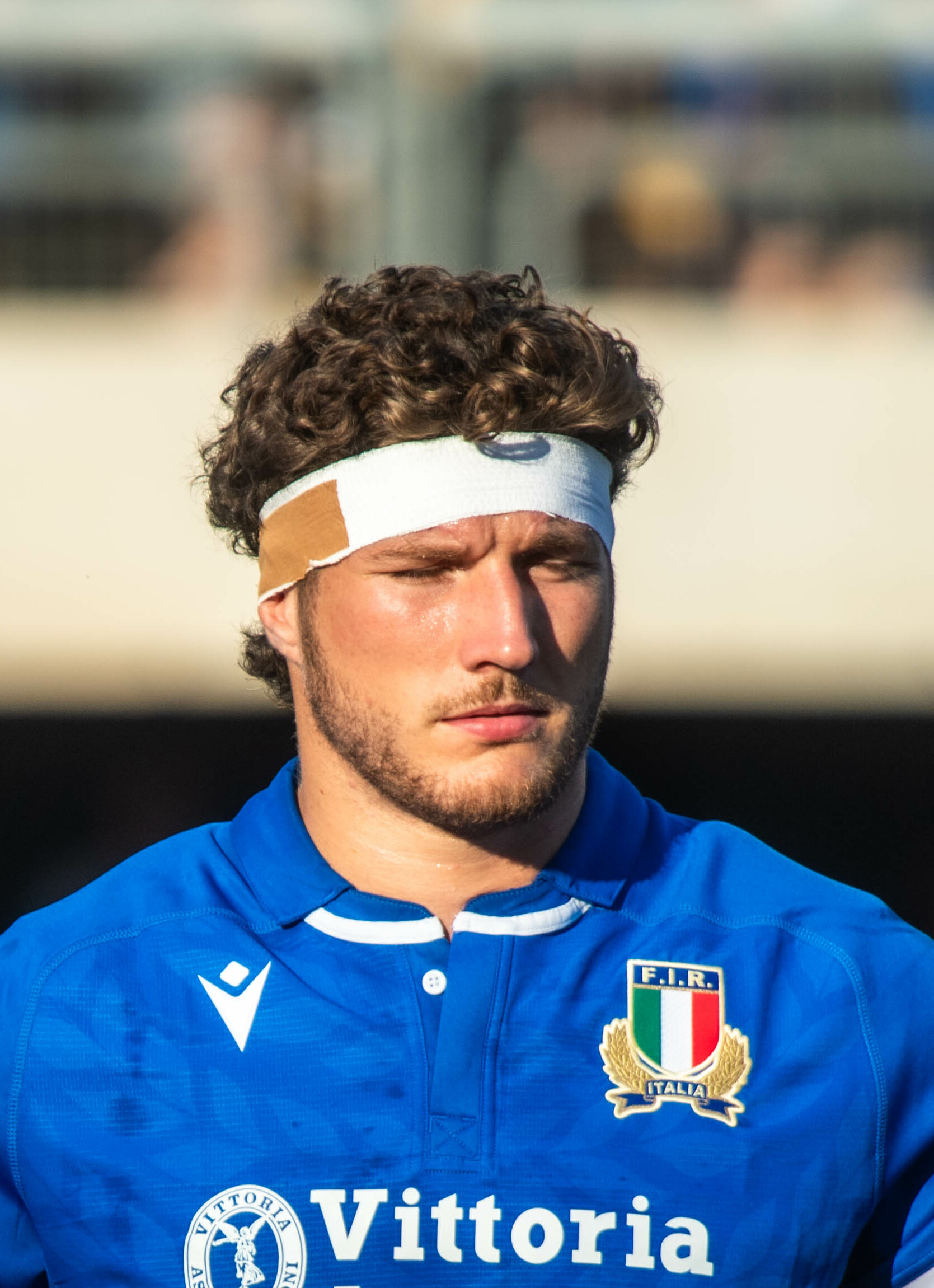
- Lamb in 2023
- Born: Dino Luciano Lamb; 18 April 1998 (age 28) Warwickshire, England
- Height: 1.96 m (6 ft 5 in)
- Weight: 119 kg (262 lb; 18 st 10 lb)
- School: Cranleigh School

Rugby union career
- Position(s): Lock, Flanker
Youth career
- 2006–2012: Worthing
- 2012–2016: Harlequins
Senior career
Years	Team	Apps	(Points)
2016–2025	Harlequins	105	(50)
2017–2018	→ Worthing	12	(20)
2025–2026	Canon Eagles	3	(0)
- Correct as of 30 June 2025
International career
Years	Team	Apps	(Points)
2016	England U18	7	(5)
2017–2018	England U20	8	(0)
2023−2025	Italy	12	(10)
- Correct as of 30 June 2025

Dino Luciano Lamb (born 18 April 1998) is a professional rugby union player who plays as a lock for Yokohama Canon Eagles in the Japan Rugby League One and represents Italy at international level.

== Career ==
Lamb was picked by Harlequins when he was 14 years old, signing his first professional contract in 2016. He featured numerous times for Harlequins in the A-League and Premiership Rugby Sevens Series before making his debut for the senior side against Northampton Saints in September 2017.

Lamb suffered two injuries in short succession at the end of the 2016–17 season, he joined National League side Worthing RFC on loan to help get back to match fitness.

Lamb started in the 2019–20 Premiership Rugby Cup final which Harlequins lost against Sale Sharks to finish runners up. The following season saw Quins reach the league play-offs and he featured in their semi-final win over Bristol Bears. He was a replacement in the final against Exeter Chiefs on 26 June 2021 as Harlequins won the title with a 40–38 victory in the highest-scoring Premiership final ever.

In June 2025 he left Harlequins and signed for Japanese side Yokohama Canon Eagles in Japan Rugby League One.

== International career ==
Lamb played for England U18 in 2016. He was selected by England U20 for the 2017 World Rugby Under 20 Championship and started in the final which they lost against New Zealand. The following year he was a member of the England side that finished runners up in the 2018 Six Nations Under 20s Championship.

On 5 July 2023, Lamb was selected by coach Kieran Crowley to be part of an Italy squad for the 2023 Rugby World Cup warm-up matches. He is eligible due to his father being from Turin. Lamb made his senior international debut against Ireland on 5 August 2023. In their next warm-up game he scored his first try in a victory over Romania.

On 22 August 2023, Lamb was named in the Italy's 33-man squad for the 2023 Rugby World Cup. He scored a try in their opening game of the tournament against Namibia.

== Statistics ==
=== List of international test tries ===
Try	Opposing team	Location	Venue	Competition	Date	Result	Score
1	Romania	San Benedetto del Tronto, Italy	Stadio Riviera delle Palme	Summer Nations Series	19 August 2023	Win	57 – 7
2	Namibia	Saint-Etienne, France	Stade Geoffroy Guichard	2023 Rugby World Cup	9 September 2023	Win	52 – 8

== Style of play ==
Lamb is known for his exceptional athleticism as well as his versatility, being able to play across the back row in addition to his usual position in the second row.

== Honours ==
=== Harlequins ===
- Premiership Rugby: 2020–21
