= The Clash (rugby union) =

Annual rugby union match in England

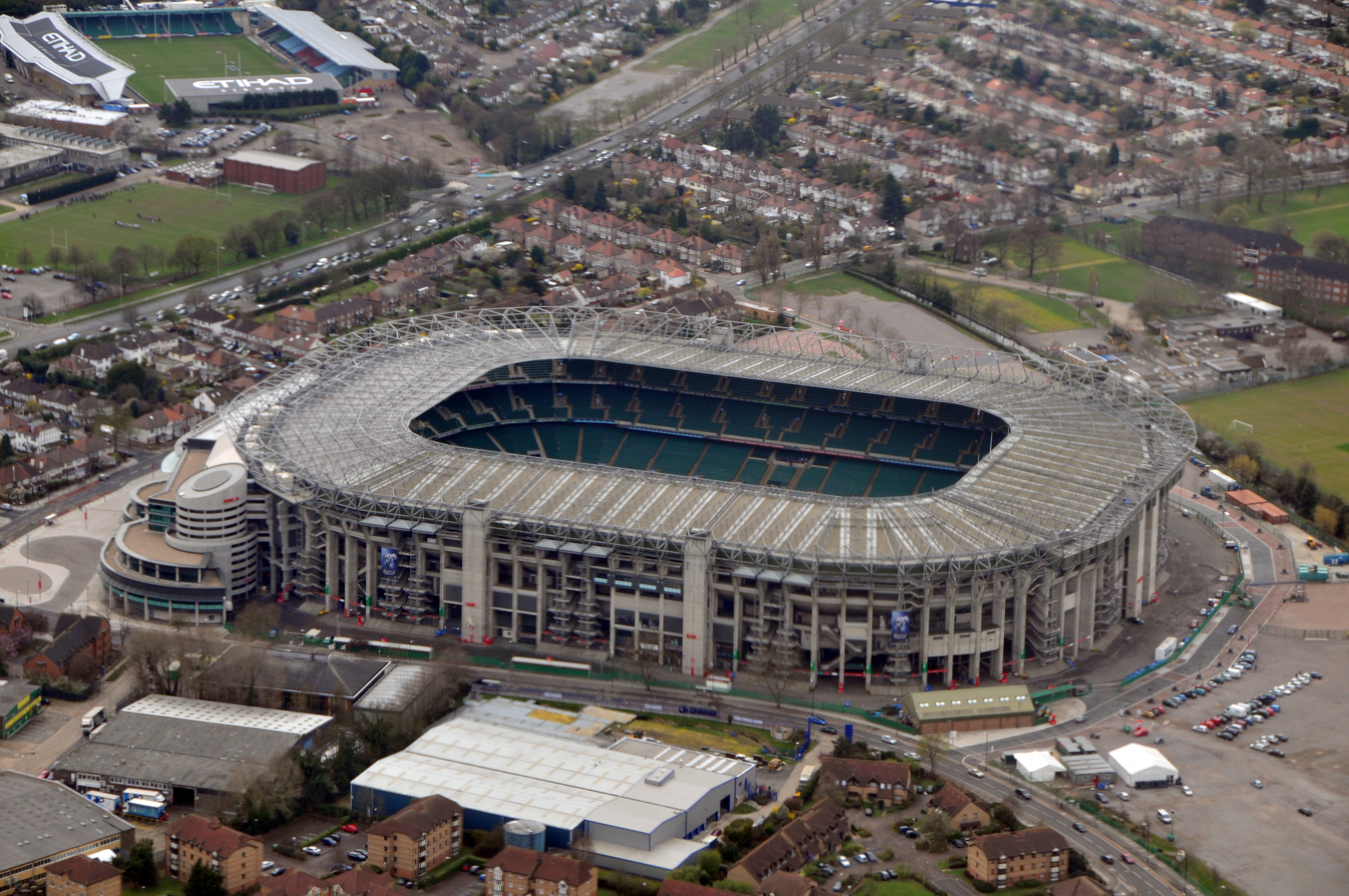
An aerial view of Twickenham Stadium

The Clash was an annual rugby union match hosted by Bath Rugby around Easter time each year. It is one of Bath's regular home matches in Premiership Rugby but it is moved from their usual home ground at the Recreation Ground in Bath (14,500 capacity) to the much larger Twickenham Stadium in London (82,000 seats).

There are other high-profile matches in London between Premiership Rugby clubs at other times, particularly the London Double Header and the Big Game (also at Twickenham) and Saracens' European or Premiership games at Wembley Stadium, London Stadium and Tottenham Hotspur Stadium.

As a result of the COVID-19 pandemic, the 2020 match against Wasps was rescheduled and moved to The Rec and no match was scheduled to be played at Twickenham in 2021.

== Game History ==
=== 2017 ===
8 April 2017
14:00

Bath	27–21	Leicester Tigers (1 BP)
Try: Joseph 20' c A. Watson (2) 67' c, 70' c Con: Ford (3/3) 22', 68', 71'; Pen: Ford (2/3) 27', 50'	Report	Try: O'Connor 4' c Veainu 11' m Con: F. Burns (1/2) 5'; Pen: F. Burns (3/3) 30', 42', 65'

Twickenham
Attendance: 61,868
Referee: JP Doyle

=== 2018 ===
7 April 2018
14:00

Bath	19–34	Leicester Tigers (1 BP)
Try: Dunn 32' c Con: Priestland (1/1) 33'; Pen: Priestland (4/5) 5', 16', 57' 65'	Report	Try: Thompstone 26' c Kalamafoni (2) 49' m, 62' m S. Harrison 72' c Veainu 77' c Con: G. Ford (3/5) 27', 73', 79'; Pen: G. Ford (1/2) 13'

Twickenham
Attendance: 60,880
Referee: Wayne Barnes

=== 2019 ===
6 April 2019
14:00

Bath	26–19	Bristol Bears
Try: Joseph 1' c Roberts 9' m Cokanasiga 21' c Priestland 55' c Con: Priestland (3/4) 2', 22', 56'		Try: D. Thomas 69' c Con: Madigan (1/1) 70'; Pen: Sheedy (4/4) 7', 30', 34', 40'

Twickenham
Attendance: 60,152
Referee: JP Doyle
