= Phil Brantingham =

English rugby union player

- Born: 2 October 2001 (age 25) Durham, England
- Height: 183 cm (6 ft 0 in)
- Weight: 117 kg (18 st 6 lb)
- School: RGS Newcastle
- University: Newcastle University

Rugby union career
- Position: Loosehead Prop
- Current team: Saracens
Youth career
- Morpeth RFC
Senior career
Years	Team	Apps	(Points)
2022–2024	Newcastle Falcons	29	(0)
2024–	Saracens	12	(0)
- Correct as of 15 February 2025
International career
Years	Team	Apps	(Points)
2019	England U18	6	(0)
2021	England U20	3	(5)
2025–	England A	1	(0)
- Correct as of 23 February 2025

Phil Brantingham (born 2 October 2001) is an English professional rugby union player who plays as a prop forward for Premiership Rugby club Saracens.

== Early life ==
Brantingham began playing contact rugby at Morpeth RFC, where his dad also played as a prop forward. He attended Royal Grammar School, Newcastle upon Tyne and in 2018 played as they won the St Joseph's Rugby Festival trophy. The following year Brantingham played the festival again and was awarded the player of the tournament award. Until the age of 17, he played both rugby union and rugby league, playing league for Cramlington Rockets and Newcastle Thunder.

== Club career ==
In January 2022 Brantingham made his debut for Newcastle in the Premiership match against Gloucester during the 2021-22 Premiership Rugby season. He was shortlisted for the Rugby Players' Association young player of the month for September 2023. He captained one of the sides in the club’s preseason True North Origin fixture at the start of the 2023-24 season.

In March 2024 it was announced that Brantingham had signed for Saracens.

== International career ==
In 2019 Brantingham represented England under-18. He was a member of the England under-20 squad that completed a grand slam during the 2021 Six Nations Under 20s Championship and scored a try against Ireland at Cardiff Arms Park.

In February 2025 Brantingham started for England A in a victory over Ireland Wolfhounds.

== Personal life ==
Brantingham studied for a degree in economics and management.
