= Marcus Smith (rugby union) =

British & Irish Lions and England international rugby union player

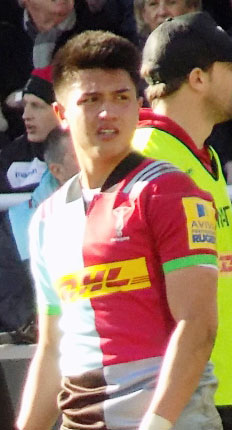
- Smith representing Harlequins during the Gallagher Premiership
- Full name: Marcus Sebastian Smith
- Born: 14 February 1999 (age 27) Parañaque, Philippines
- Height: 1.75 m (5 ft 9 in)
- Weight: 76 kg (168 lb; 12 st 0 lb)
- School: Brighton College

Rugby union career
- Position(s): Fly-half, Fullback
- Current team: Harlequins
Senior career
Years	Team	Apps	(Points)
2017–	Harlequins	201	(1,826)
- Correct as of 15 November 2026
International career
Years	Team	Apps	(Points)
2017	England U18	6	(37)
2018–2019	England U20	7	(59)
2021–	England	58	(338)
2021, 2025	British & Irish Lions	1	(3)
- Correct as of 15 November 2026
Medal record
Men's Rugby union
Representing England
Rugby World Cup
Bronze medal – third place	2023 France	Squad

Marcus Sebastian Smith (born 14 February 1999) is an English professional rugby union player who plays as a fly-half for Premiership Rugby club Harlequins. Born in the Philippines, he represents England at international level after qualifying on ancestry grounds and residency having lived in the UK since the age of 13.

== Early life ==
Born in Parañaque, Metro Manila in the Philippines to an English father and a Filipina mother, Smith started playing rugby union at the age of seven for Centaurs RFC when his family moved to Singapore. He moved to the United Kingdom at the age of thirteen and subsequently received a sports scholarship to attend Brighton College, where he captained the school's 1st XV. The young fly-half was named Player of the Tournament at the 2016 St Joseph's Rugby Festival.

== Club career ==
The fly-half first represented Harlequins at the 2016 Premiership Rugby Sevens Series.

During the 2016–17 season, as part of the Harlequin Elite Player Development Group (EPDG), Smith played five fixtures for the Harlequin U18s Academy side, scoring two tries; one each against London Irish and Saracens and contributing ten points from the tee in Harlequins U18s Academy Final win over Sale Sharks U18s.

In March 2017, Smith was promoted from the EPDG up to the full-time Academy starting in June.

Smith was named in the 12-man senior squad, alongside another Brighton College graduate Calum Waters, for the 2017 Singha Premiership Rugby Sevens at Franklin's Gardens. Smith scored two tries against London Irish on the first day and assisted Harlequins in reaching the club semi-final before losing out to Newcastle Falcons.

On 2 September 2017, Smith made his professional debut wearing the number 10 jersey for the senior Harlequins side in the Premiership Rugby London Double Header fixture against London Irish at Twickenham Stadium. At just 18 years and 200 days old, he became the second youngest fly-half to debut in the history of the competition. Two weeks later, Smith gave a Man-of-the-Match performance against Wasps, helping to end the home side's 20-match winning streak at Ricoh Arena.

In September 2020, he became the second youngest player in Premiership history to reach 500 points in the competition at 21 years and 207 days old. Only Jonny Wilkinson achieved the feat at a younger age. In April 2021, he scored the winning try in the closing moments during a 25–21 victory against London Irish. In the following game, he scored 28 points including the winning try in the last play, during a 48–46 victory against Wasps. He started in the Premiership final against Exeter Chiefs on 26 June 2021 as Harlequins won the game 40–38 in the highest scoring Premiership final ever, which included four conversions from Smith's boot.

In January 2022, he scored the final conversion after an Alex Dombrandt try in the group stages of the 2021–22 Heineken Cup, during 36–33 victory against Castres.

In March 2023, having been left out of the training squad for the 2023 Six Nations fixture that week, Smith won man of the match in Harlequins Big Game fixture, beating Exeter Chiefs 40–5.

During the 2023–24 Champions Cup, Smith scored a try and a drop goal, winning man of the match at Harlequins beat Racing 92 31–28 away. In March 2024, he won man of the match again, scoring a try and supplying a cross-field kick to André Esterhuizen as Harlequins won their first ever Champions Cup knockout game, beating Glasgow Warriors 28–24 at home in the Round of 16. The following week, he kicked 5 conversions in the 42–41 victory over Union Bordeaux Bègles in the quarter finals making it only the second time the club had won a knockout tie in the competition and the first time they had completed the feat away from home. Following their qualification to the semi finals, Smith was one of eight players nominated for Player of the Championship for the 2023–24 season.

In December 2024, he signed a new deal to stay with Harlequins until at least 2028.

In October 2025, he scored his first try of the season and won man of the match in his first game back from international duty in a 20–14 victory against Saracens.

In October 2026, he made his 200th appearance for the club, scoring a try and winning man of the match, during a 33–15 victory against Saracens.

== International career ==
=== England U18 ===
Smith started his first England appearance with a try in an under-16s match victory against Wales in April 2015. In February 2017 Smith represented the England under-20 team against Italy in the 2017 Six Nations Under 20s Championship and then in April 2017 scored a try for the England under-18 team against Ireland.

In May 2017, Smith took part in a training session with the elite senior England squad, during their 3-day camp at Brighton College, in preparation for the Old Mutual Wealth Cup match against the Barbarians and their summer tour to Argentina.

In July 2017, Smith was named in the England U18s squad for a tour of South Africa in August but was withdrawn prior to the tour and instead on 3 August 2017, Smith was named in Eddie Jones' pre-season senior England training squad. Eddie Jones described Smith's inclusion in the senior squad as part of the plan to develop young players as well as to give pressure on experienced players such as Owen Farrell and George Ford.

=== England U20 ===
On 22 September 2017, Smith was named in the 33-man England training squad for a camp in Oxford ahead of the Autumn internationals, although England coach Eddie Jones said he would be "treated like an apprentice". In the following month on 26 October, Smith was called into the England squad for the Autumn international series. He was also part of the training squad during the 2018 Six Nations Championship.

Smith was named in the England U20 squad for the 2018 World Rugby Under 20 Championship in France and scored tries in pool games against Argentina and Italy. He started at fly-half for the semi-final against South Africa and defeat in the final against France as England finished runners up to the hosts. Smith declined selection for the 2019 World Rugby Under 20 Championship.

=== England ===
After declining to join the 2019 U-20 team, Smith instead made his non-capped England debut on 2 June 2019 against the Barbarians. During the game, Smith contributed 26 points, including a try towards a 51–43 victory for England and was awarded Man of the Match for his performance.

On 4 July 2021, Smith made his full England test debut against the United States, contributing 13 points, including a try, in a 43–29 victory. He earned his second start against Canada six days later, with a faultless kicking display in a 70–14 win for England.

In the 2021 Autumn rugby union internationals, Smith scored a try as a second-half replacement against Tonga on 6 November, and kicked five conversions. He started the match against Australia the following week as fly-half but often stood outside Owen Farrell until Farrell went off injured in the second half. He played a full match at fly-half against South Africa on 20 November, kicking three conversions and two penalties, one in the last minute to give England the victory by a single point.

The 2022 Six Nations campaign opened with the Calcutta Cup fixture away at Murrayfield in Edinburgh on 5 February. In the absence of Owen Farrell through injury and George Ford not in the original squad, Smith started at number 10 and his performance was highly praised. However many were surprised that, despite this and England's early dominance, coach Eddie Jones decided to replace Smith after 60 minutes despite his having scored a try and made four successful kicks. In the subsequent Six Nations game against Italy, Smith played for the full 80 minutes and scored England's first try and was awarded Man of the Match, an accolade he was again awarded in their next game against Wales. Smith was the highest point scorer for the 2022 Six Nations Championship.

In August 2023, Smith was selected for the 2023 Rugby World Cup. Throughout the tournament, he made his international debut at full back having seemingly fallen to third choice at fly half behind George Ford and England Captain Owen Farrell. Smith played at full back throughout the tournament including the quarter final victory over Fiji, as they went on to finish overall.

In January 2024, it was announced that Smith was on crutches after suffering an injury. It meant that he was likely to miss the Six Nations tournament in what England attack coach Richard Wigglesworth admitted would be a "blow" to the team's chances. However he went to feature in the tournament. In England's match against Ireland at Twickenham on March 9, Smith scored a drop goal to end the match and give England the victory with a 23–22 score line. In the final game of the tournament, he put in another impressive performance off the bench. Having replaced George Furbank at full back early on, he scored a try at the Parc Olympique Lyonnais as England narrowly lost 33–31 in France after a late penalty from Thomas Ramos. In June 2024, Smith scored 13 points in a win over Japan on 22 June 24. This included his 12th try in just his 31st international. In October 2024, he was named in the England squad to compete in the autumn nations series. Later that month, he was one of 17 players to be awarded an Enhanced Elite Squad Player (EPS) contract by the RFU. As of 15 December 2024, he has scored the most tries, with a total of eight, and made the most line breaks, with a total of 18, of any fly half of a tier one nation since making his debut in July 2021.

In January 2025, he was named in the senior training squad for the 2025 Six Nations. In March 2025, he scored a try in the penultimate round of the tournament in a 47–24 victory over Italy. After returning from playing with the Lions, his EPS contract was extended for the 2025–26 season.

In November 2026 he came off the bench in the 2026 Nations Championship against Japan and scored one of England's 13 tries.

=== British and Irish Lions ===
On 10 July, Smith was called up to the 2021 British and Irish Lions squad as injury cover for Finn Russell. On 17 July, Smith made his British and Irish Lions debut, playing at fly-half for the full 80 minutes against the Stormers. He converted all 7 tries successfully for a 49–3 win for the Lions.

In May 2025, he was selected for the 2025 British & Irish Lions tour to Australia. In July 2025, he made his first capped appearance coming off the bench to replace Finn Russell in the first test match fixture, scoring a penalty as the Lions went on to win 27–19. Though he did not feature in the other test fixtures, the Lions went on to secure a 2–1 series victory.

== Career statistics ==
=== List of international tries ===
as of 18 July 2026.

No.	Date	Venue	Opponent	Score	Result	Competition
1	4 July 2021	Twickenham Stadium, London, England	United States	36–15	43–29	2021 Summer Internationals
2	6 November 2021	Twickenham Stadium, London, England	Tonga	53–3	69–3	2021 Autumn Internationals
3	5 February 2022	Murrayfield Stadium, Edinburgh, Scotland	Scotland	14–10	17–20	2022 Six Nations Championship
4	13 February 2022	Stadio Olimpico, Rome, Italy	Italy	5–0	33–0	2022 Six Nations Championship
5	16 July 2022	Sydney Cricket Ground, Sydney, Australia	Australia	19–10	21–17	2022 England tour of Australia
6	12 November 2022	Twickenham Stadium, London, England	Japan	15–0	52–13	2022 Autumn Internationals
7	12 November 2022	Twickenham Stadium, London, England	Japan	50–13	52–13	2022 Autumn Internationals
8	26 August 2023	Twickenham Stadium, London, England	Fiji	13–20	22–30	2023 Rugby World Cup warm-up match
9	23 September 2023	Stade Pierre-Mauroy, Lille, France	Chile	29–0	71–0	2023 Rugby World Cup
10	23 September 2023	Stade Pierre-Mauroy, Lille, France	Chile	62–0	71–0	2023 Rugby World Cup
11	16 March 2024	Parc Olympique Lyonnais, Décines-Charpieu, France	France	22–16	33–31	2024 Six Nations Championship
12	22 June 2024	National Stadium, Tokyo, Japan	Japan	12–3	52–17	2024 Summer Internationals
13	9 March 2025	Twickenham Stadium, London, England	Italy	33–17	47-24	2025 Six Nations Championship
14	14 March 2026	Stade de France, Saint-Denis, France	France	38–39	48-46	2026 Six Nations Championship
15	11 July 2026	Hill Dickinson Stadium, Liverpool, England	Fiji	5-0	73-8	2026 Nations Championship
16	18 July 2026	Estadio Unico Madre de Ciudades, Santiago del Estero, Argentina	Argentina	17-19	24-31	2026 Nations Championship
17	14 November 2026	Twickenham Stadium, London, England	Japan		78–15	2026 Nations Championship
