= Lewis Ludlam =

English rugby union player (born 1995)

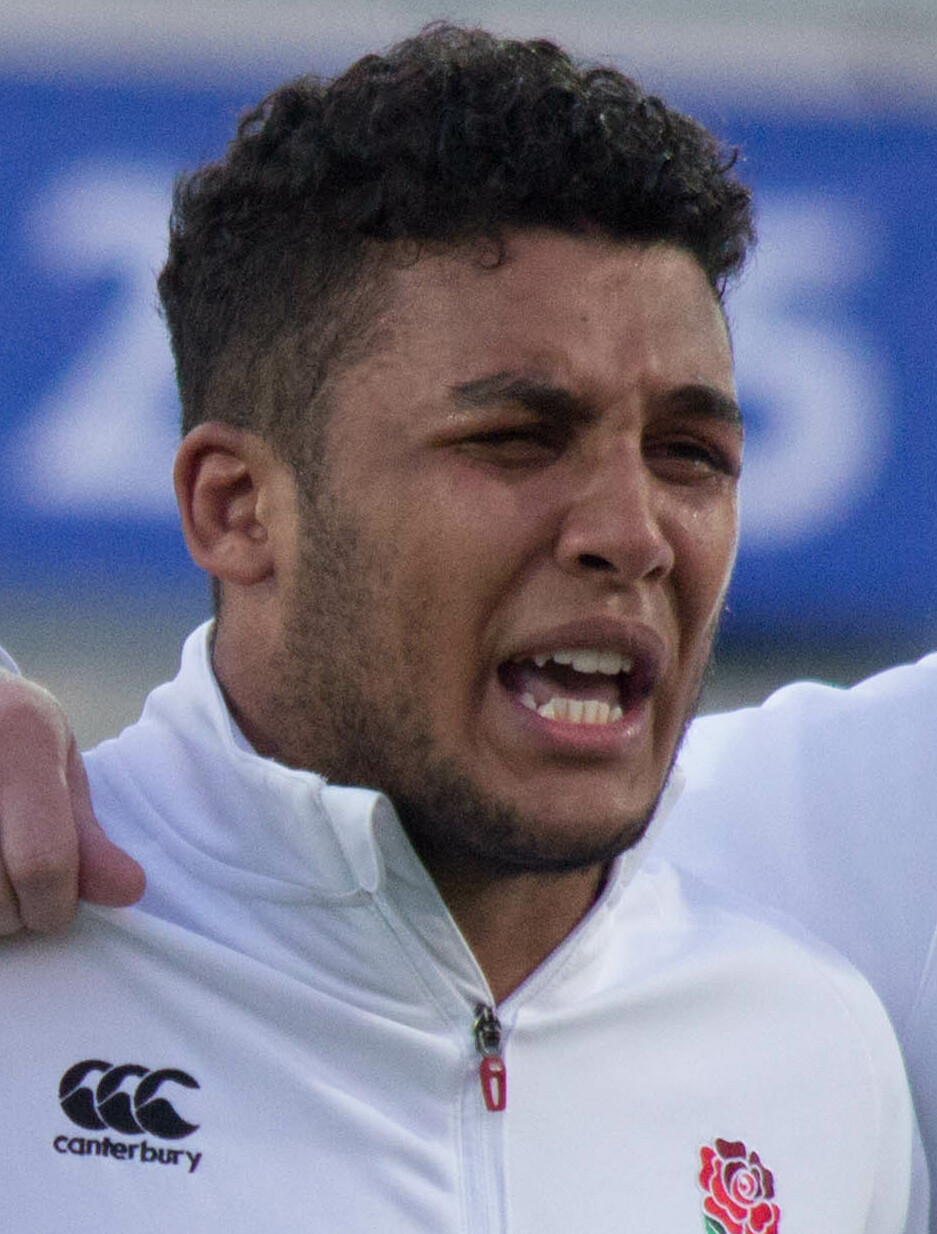
- Full name: Lewis Wesley Ludlam
- Born: 8 December 1995 (age 30) Ipswich, England
- Height: 1.90 m (6 ft 3 in)
- Weight: 111 kg (245 lb; 17 st 7 lb)
- School: Kesgrave High School; St Joseph's College

Rugby union career
- Position(s): Flanker, Number 8
- Current team: Northampton Saints
Senior career
Years	Team	Apps	(Points)
2014–2024	Northampton Saints	128	(80)
2024–	Toulon	29	(5)
- Correct as of 22 May 2025
International career
Years	Team	Apps	(Points)
2015	England U20s	4	(0)
2019–2023	England	25	(10)
- Correct as of 27 October 2023

Lewis Wesley Ludlam (born 8 December 1995) is an English professional rugby union player who plays as a flanker for Top 14 club Toulon and formerly for the England national team.

== Early life ==
Ludlam was born in Ipswich, into a family who followed boxing and football. He is of paternal Palestinian and maternal Guyanese descent.

He attended Kesgrave High School before being recruited on a sports scholarship to a renowned local rugby school, St Joseph's College, Ipswich, and played at Ipswich Rugby Club before joining Colchester RFC.

=== Junior career ===
Ludlam featured on three occasions at the St Joseph's Rugby Festival, first appearing in the under-18 competition as a 15-year-old in 2011, and was also a key member of the side that reached the Daily Mail Cup semi final in the same year. Ludlam captained Waterhead Wolverines, coached by Geoff Owen MBE, to its third victory in the national schools festival in 2013 in front of a raucous home crowd and also captained the school at U16 level to its first win at the Rosslyn Park national schools sevens competition in 2012.

Despite being released by Saints' EPDG Academy, Ludlam regained a place in the Saints' Under-18s and he moved up to the Saints' Senior Academy full time a few years later.

Ludlam then earned the call to the England U18s where he featured in their unbeaten 2014 tour of South Africa. The following year saw Ludlam represent the England U20 team that lost to New Zealand in the final of the 2015 World Rugby Under 20 Championship. He was subsequently voted England's player of the tournament by his peers.

== Club career ==
During his time at Saints, Ludlam has spent short periods of his senior career on dual registration with Coventry, Moseley and Rotherham Titans. Breaking into Saints' first-team squad in the 2016–17 campaign, Ludlam made his first-team debut in the Anglo-Welsh Cup opener that season and featured in a further 6 games for the club. Ludlam helped Saints' second team, the Wanderers, lift the Aviva 'A' League trophy in 2016–2017, defeating Gloucester United in the final for the title and again in 2017–2018 winning the final against a very strong Exeter Braves side.

Ludlam made his full Premiership debut in the first game of the 2017–2018 season against Saracens in the London Double Header at Twickenham, scoring his first senior try for the club in the heavy 24–55 defeat to the European Champions. Ludlam's real breakout season for Saints came in the 2018–2019 campaign where he made 27 appearances for the club, scoring four tries and being one of the club's most consistent performers in new director of rugby, Chris Boyd’s first year in charge. From a disappointing previous season, Saints exceeded expectations by reaching a play off semi-final which secured qualification for the European Rugby Champions Cup and won the Premiership Rugby Cup. Ludlam was one of a number of youngsters that Boyd put his faith in, playing an expansive entertaining brand of rugby that delighted Saints fans.

In November 2020 it was announced that Ludlam would become club co-captain with Alex Waller. Subsequently, from the start of the 2021 to 2022 season, Ludlam would take on the solo captaincy of the team.

On 24 June 2024, Ludlam would end his England career as he signs a three-year deal to join top French side Toulon in the Top 14 from the 2024-25 season.

== International career ==
In June 2019 he was one of four uncapped players named in England's preliminary World Cup training squad and on 11 August 2019 made his debut in a warm-up match against Wales. He was included in the squad for the 2019 Rugby World Cup and made four appearances during the tournament, scoring his first international try in the pool fixture against the United States.

Over the next 4 years under Eddie Jones, further caps would be fairly limited but in 2023 under new head coach, Steve Borthwick, Ludlam returned to play every minute of the 2023 Six Nations.

=== List of international tries ===
As of 18 September 2023

Try	Opposing team	Location	Venue	Competition	Date	Result	Score
1	United States	Kobe, Japan	Kobe Misaki Stadium	2019 Rugby World Cup	26 September 2019	Win	45 – 7
2	Japan	Nice, France	Stade de Nice	2023 Rugby World Cup	17 September 2023	Win	34 – 12

== Personal life ==
Ludlam has talked about the importance of 'drawing in' younger spectators to watch rugby, and questioned if 'less is more' in terms of the excitement level of the number of competitions and games played.

== Honours ==
England

- Rugby World Cup / Webb Ellis Cup
  - Runner up: 2019

Northampton Saints

- Gallagher Premiership
  - Winner: 2023/2024 Gallagher Premiership
