= Ryan Manyika =

- Born: Ryan Tawanda Manyika; 14 December 1988 (age 37) Zimbabwe
- Height: 172 cm (5 ft 8 in)
- Weight: 70 kg (154 lb)
- School: Brighton College

Rugby union career
- Position: Half-back / Scrum-half / Fly-half
Youth career
- Harlequins Academy
Senior career
Years	Team	Apps	(Points)
2008-2010	Harlequins	4	(14)
National sevens team
Years	Team		Comps
2009-2011	Zimbabwe		

Ryan Tawanda Manyika (born 14 December 1988) is a former rugby union player for Harlequin F.C. in the English Premiership Rugby competition, playing in the half-back positions of scrum-half or fly-half. He was educated at Prince Edward School, Harare before transferring to Brighton College via a sports academic scholarship.

== Background ==
Born and raised in Zimbabwe, Manyika first picked up a rugby ball aged 12 influenced by his older brother who had recently tried the sport. He excelled immensely in a short space of time later leading to him being spotted and scouted by Brighton College Sports Master, Richard Halsall. He received a sports-academic scholarship to complete his studies in the United Kingdom in the city of Brighton. He later went on to captain the schools 1st XV and break the schools points record by an outfield player. Donning the No.10 shirt Manyika was named 'Player of the Tournament' at the 2006 St Joseph's Rugby Festival. This later influenced Harlequin F.C. decision to sign Manyika upon leaving school aged 18.

== Club career ==
His first outing for Harlequin F.C. came in the Middlesex Premiership Rugby Sevens at Twickenham. Having joined as an academy Pro months before, on 17 August 2008 Manyika was named on the replacements bench for the team to face Manu Samoa as part of their World Cup preparations at the Twickenham Stoop. Manyika came off the bench to make his debut replacing Seb Jewell.

== International career ==
Manyika made his first international appearance representing Zimbabwe U19 at the 2007 Under 19 Rugby World Championship in Belfast, Northern Ireland. Upon leaving Harlequin F.C. he went on to play for the Zimbabwe national rugby sevens team in the World Rugby Sevens Series, winning the Bowl final at the 2009 Rugby World Cup Sevens in the United Arab Emirates. Manyika played a total of seven matches for the Zimbabwe national sevens team, scoring a total of 20 points (2 tries and 5 conversions).
