= Stadio Riviera delle Palme =

Multi-use stadium in San Benedetto del Tronto, Italy

Coordinates: 42°55′50″N 13°53′5″E

- The Temple of Typhus
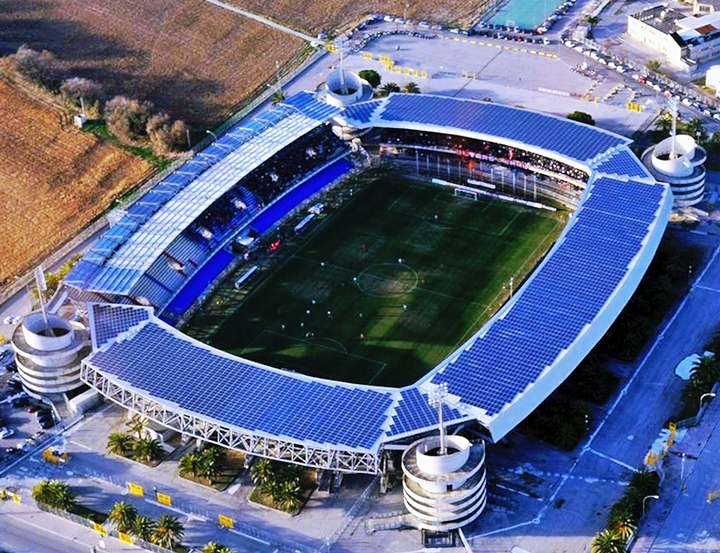
- Interactive map of Stadio Riviera delle Palme
- Location: San Benedetto del Tronto, Italy
- Owner: Municipality of San Bendetto del Tronto
- Capacity: 13,708
- Surface: Grass; 105 × 68 m

Construction
- Groundbreaking: 1983
- Opened: 1985
- Renovated: 2010
- Architect: Luigi Corradi

Tenant
- S.S. Sambenedettese Calcio

The Stadio Riviera delle Palme is a multi-use stadium in San Benedetto del Tronto, Italy. It is currently used mostly for football matches and is the home ground of S.S. Sambenedettese Calcio. The stadium has a capacity of 13,708 people and is located in the "Brancadoro" area, Ragnola neighbourhood of San Benedetto del Tronto.

== History ==
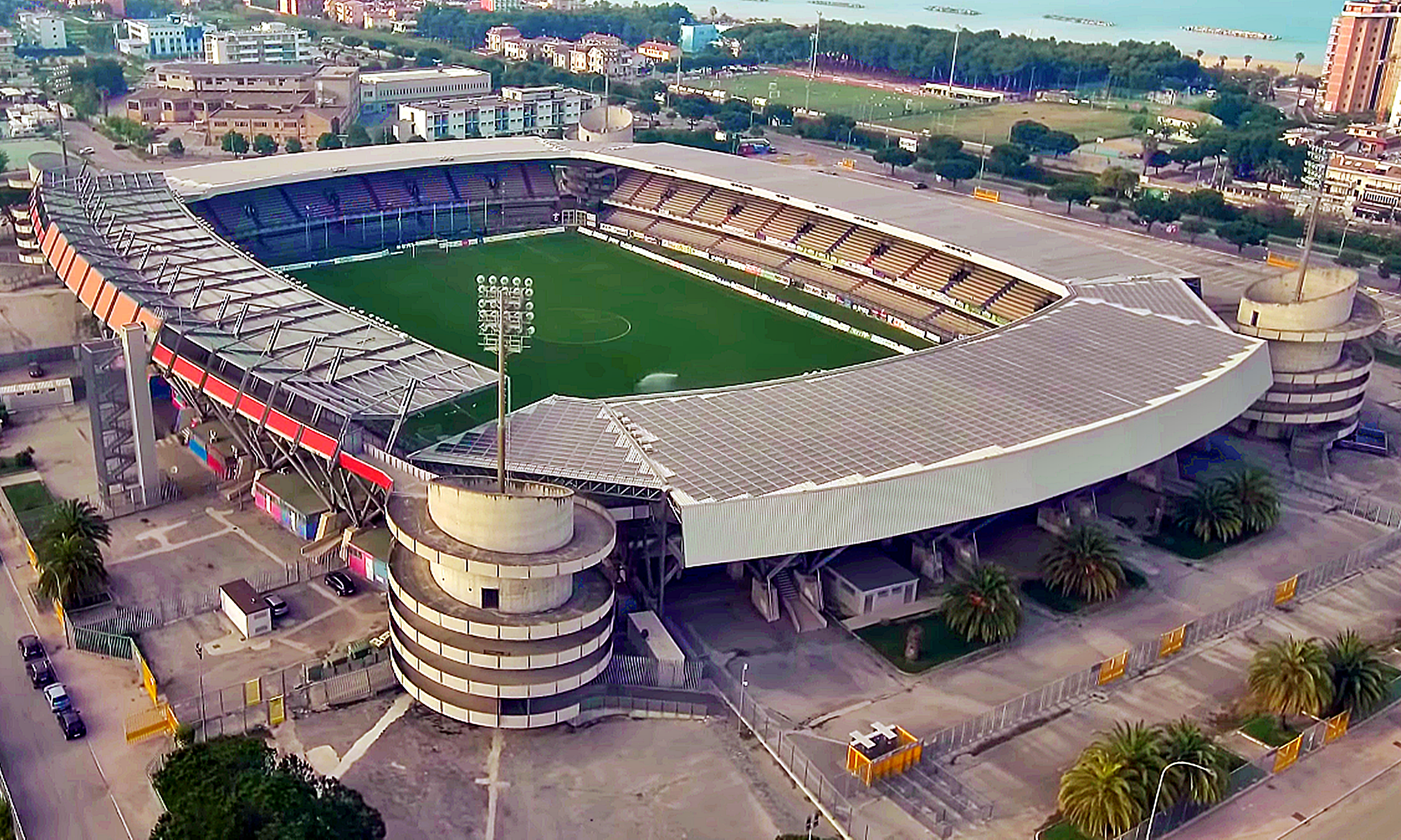
Aerial view of the Riviera of the Palms Stadium

The stadium, with a steel supporting structure based on a structural design by Eng. Luigi Corradi and architect of the arch. Vincenzo Acciarri, was built in the mid-80s and awarded at European level as the best sports work in steel and prefabricated reinforced concrete. It was inaugurated on 10 August 1985 with a friendly match between S.S. Lazio and S.S. Sambenedettese Calcio, although many consider the unofficial inauguration of 13 August 1985 with a friendly match between A.C. Milan and Sambenedettese, a team that competes in the home matches and has its registered office, as well as 20,000 spectators in the stands. The stadium recorded its highest capacity at 23,000 people during a match in 1997.

The roof of the stadium has a photovoltaic system, with 4,546 solar panels in polycrystalline silicon of 220 nominal power. It is the second Italian stadium, after Stadio Marc'Antonio Bentegodi, to use solar panels.

== Description ==
Initially it had a capacity of about 22,000 spectators, it was designed for the possibility of a future extension. Later, to comply with safety regulations in the stadiums, the authorized capacity was reduced to 7,494 places.

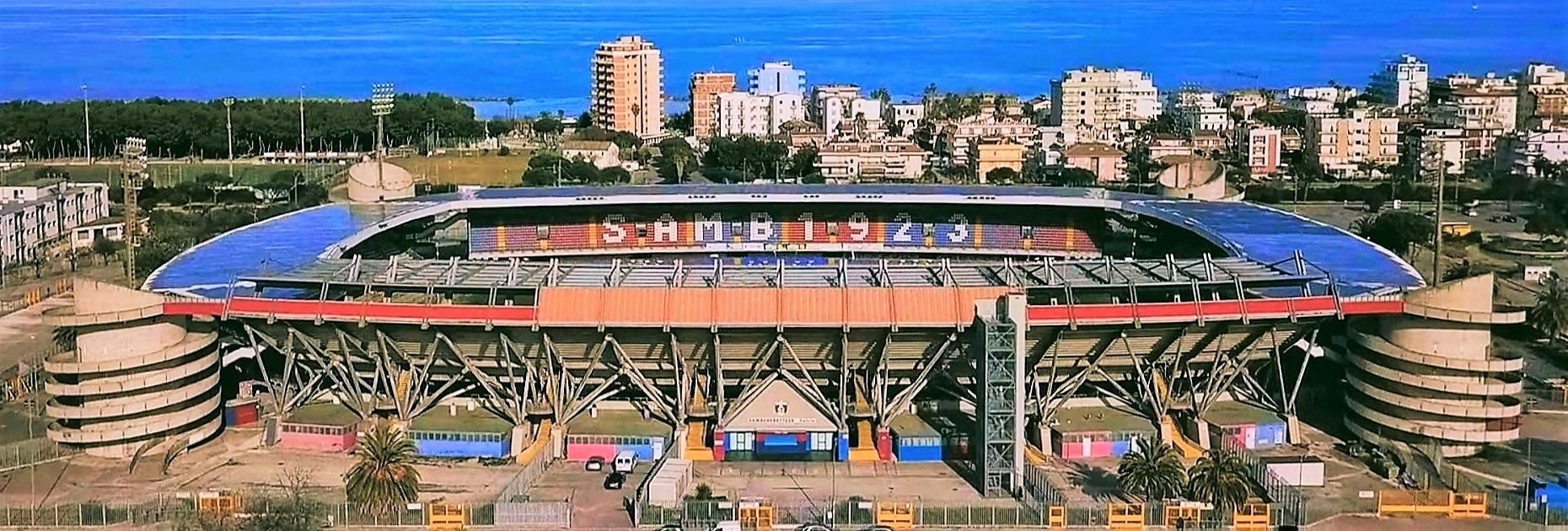
Panoramic view of the hills behind with the Adriatic Sea in the background.

Since 2010, after the refurbishment works, the capacity has been increased to around 14,000 numbered seats, all seated, arranged on two rings with full coverage in all sectors, complete the structure four towers of 'angle in prestressed concrete, which favor the inflow and outflow of spectators, incorporate a small bar, toilets and High-mast lighting for lighting sports venue. Above the cover is placed a paneling of Photovoltaic system.

=== New turf ===
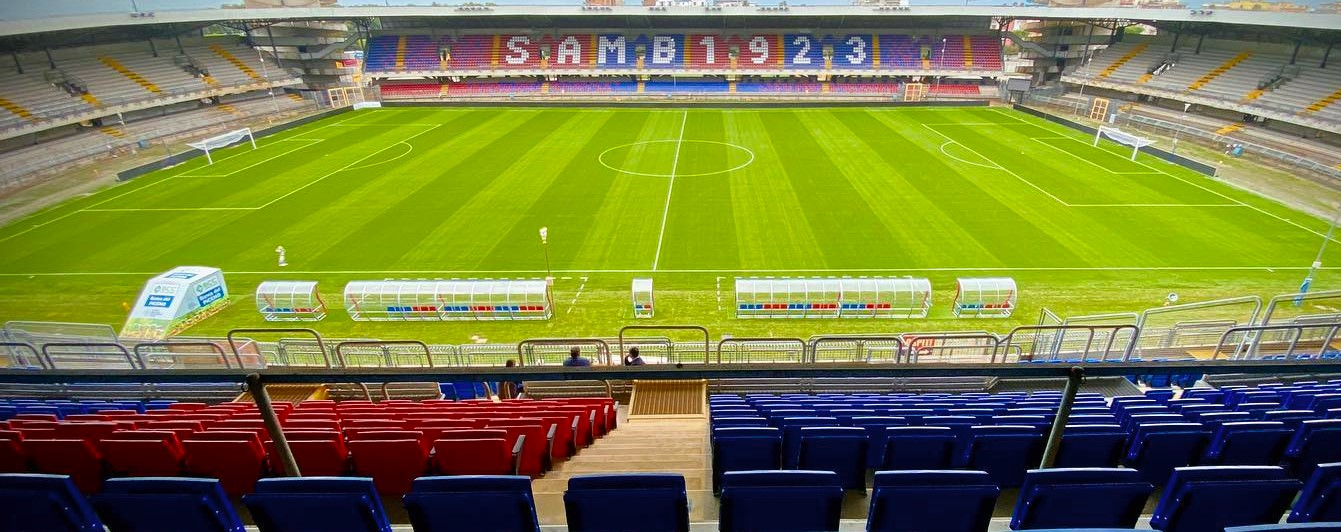
the new turf of the facility

In August 2020, work began on resurfacing and replacing the natural turf of the Riviera delle Palme, present since 1985, with a latest-generation PowerGrass turf, natural and reinforced with Artificial turf.

== International matches ==
Three international matches of the Italy national under-21 football team have taken place at the stadium:

Date	Match	Score	Stage	Attendance
18 October 1985	Italy – Belgium	3–0	European Championship Qualifying match	10,735
23 March 1988	Italy – France	2–2	1988 UEFA European Under-21 Championship	13,505
17 Jeanuary 2001	Italy – Slovenia	5–0	Friendly match	6,500
10 August 2016	Italy – Albania	0–0	Friendly match	4,000

=== International friendly match ===
Date	Match	Score	Stage	Attendance
11 August 1997	Juventus – Bayern Munich	1–0	City of San Benedetto del Tronto Trophy	18,033
13 August 1998	Milan – Celta de Vigo	1–0	Friendly match	10,000
22 August 1998	Juventus – Espanyol	0–1	City of San Benedetto del Tronto Trophy	20,000
6 August 2017	Inter – Villarreal	3–1	Friendly match	14,000

=== Rugby ===
It hosted the Italian national rugby team on two occasions, both test matches in preparation for the Rugby World Cup:

Date	Match	Score	Stage	Attendance
17 August 2019	Italy – Russia	85 – 15	Test match	10,000
19 August 2023	Italy – Romania	57–7	Test match	9,122
