= Nick Evans (rugby union) =

New Zealand rugby union player (born 1980)

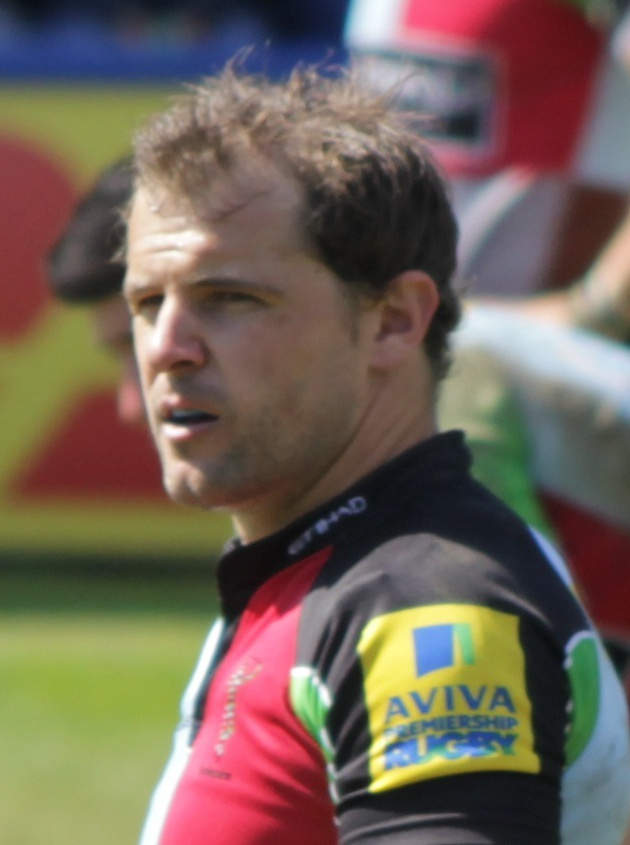
- Evans in 2013
- Born: Nicholas John Evans; 14 August 1980 (age 46) Auckland
- Height: 1.78 m (5 ft 10 in)
- Weight: 90 kg (14 st 2 lb; 198 lb)
- School: Westlake Boys' High School

Rugby union career
- Position(s): Fly-half, Fullback
Senior career
Years	Team	Apps	(Points)
2008–2017	Harlequins	208	(2,249)
- Correct as of 6 May 2017
Provincial / State sides
Years	Team	Apps	(Points)
2001–04	N. Harbour	?	(?)
2005–06	Otago	35	(?)
2007–08	Auckland	26	(391)
- Correct as of 31 January 2013
Super Rugby
Years	Team	Apps	(Points)
2004–07	Highlanders	32	(164)
2008	Blues	12	(150)
- Correct as of 31 January 2013
International career
Years	Team	Apps	(Points)
2004–07	New Zealand	16	(103)
- Correct as of 31 January 2013
Coaching career
- Years: Team
- 2017–: Harlequins (Attack Coach)
- 2023: England (Attack Coach)

Nicholas John Evans (born 14 August 1980) is a New Zealand former rugby union player. He played at fly-half and fullback. He played for the Highlanders and the Blues in Super 14. At 28 he joined Harlequins for the 2008–09 Premiership Rugby season, and remained with the club until his retirement on a deal reportedly worth £320,000 a year. He retired at the end of the 2016–17 season and is now a coach for Quins.

== Biography ==
Evans was born in North Shore City in New Zealand, and attended Westlake Boys High School, where he played first five-eighth (fly-half) for his school's First XV. He played both rugby union and Aussie rules football at the school. He played club rugby with the East Coast Bays Rugby Club in the North Harbour Premiers.

Evans graduated to the NZ under-21 and senior Aussie Rules Football sides, competed against state teams and was offered a trial with the Sydney Swans., turning it down to commit his future to rugby union.

Although he has grown since, he was at the time considered short for professional Aussie Rules at 176 cm. He later decided to commit to rugby union and played for the Highlanders in the Super 14 and for Otago in the National Provincial Championship. However, on 25 May 2007 Evans announced he would not be re-signing with the Otago Rugby Football Union and would either sign for a Union closer to his family on the North Shore, or become one of many New Zealand rugby players heading overseas if he did not make the All Blacks World Cup squad. He decided to move closer to his family.

== Playing career ==
=== New Zealand ===
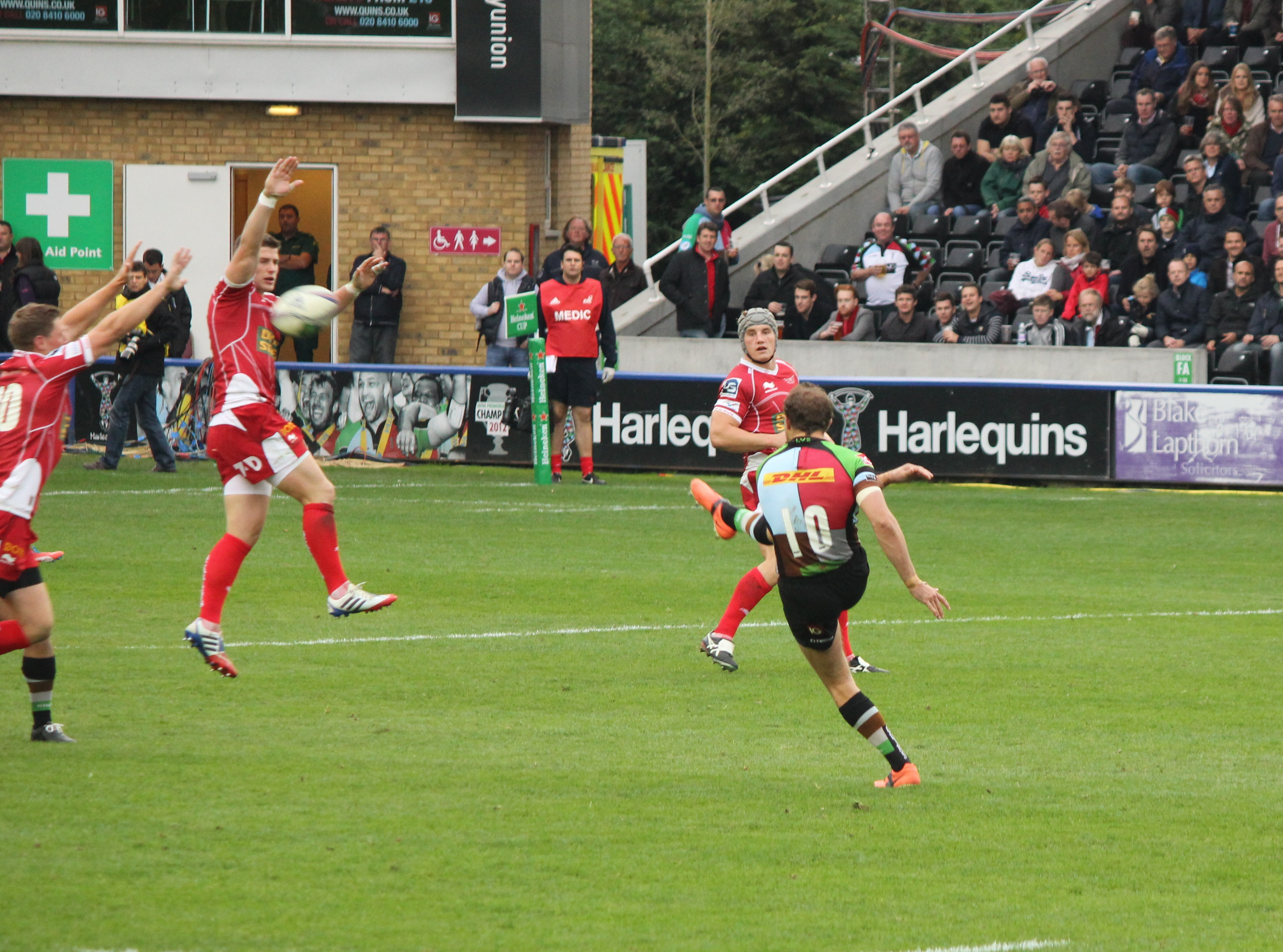
Nick Evans kicking a drop goal in a rugby union match for Harlequin F.C.

After impressing in both provincial and Super rugby, he made his All Blacks debut aged 23 against England in 2004. In his last game against Wales when he came on as a replacement for Carter, he broke the line with his first touch off first phase to set up Sitiveni Sivivatu for an easy try underneath the posts. Evans was selected in the 30-man New Zealand Squad at the 2007 Rugby World Cup. He started at first five-eighth against Portugal in a game which New Zealand won 108–13, and in the process accumulated 33 points via 14 conversions and a try. He played in the game against Scotland, having been summoned from the bench to play at fullback and looked very handy. He was rewarded with a further start at fullback against Romania and scored 17 points through a try and six conversions.

Evans was overlooked for New Zealand's 2008 Tri Nations series. After signing with English Premiership side Harlequin FC, he became ineligible to play for his national side due to the NZRU's policy of only selecting players within New Zealand to play for the All Blacks side.

=== Premiership ===
Since joining the Harlequins, Evans has been a chief architect of on-field success of the club. He was instrumental in the Harlequins back-to-back defeats of Stade Français in the Heineken Cup and helped salvage a draw for his side in their Boxing Day clash with the Leicester Tigers in the Guinness Premiership. During the 2010–11 season Evans has continued his on field success at Harlequins with his most notable performance coming in the European Challenge Cup, putting a man of the match effort against London Wasps in the quarter finals and kicking the winning conversion in the final against Stade Francais. Evans signed a new contract with Harlequins to see him with the club until 2013.

He started for Harlequins in their 2011–12 Premiership final victory over Leicester Tigers and scored six penalties and one conversion.

== International ==
Against	Pld	W	D	L	Tri	Con	Pen	DG	Pts	%Won
Argentina	1	1	0	0	0	0	0	0	0	100
Australia	1	1	0	0	0	0	0	0	0	100
England	2	2	0	0	0	0	0	0	0	100
France	4	3	0	1	1	2	1	0	12	75
Ireland	1	1	0	0	0	4	4	0	20	100
Pacific Islanders	1	1	0	0	0	0	0	0	0	100
Portugal	1	1	0	0	1	14	0	0	33	100
Romania	1	1	0	0	1	6	0	0	17	100
Scotland	2	2	0	0	1	2	1	0	12	100
South Africa	1	1	0	0	1	0	0	0	5	100
Wales	1	1	0	0	0	2	0	0	4	100
Total	16	15	0	1	5	30	6	0	103	93.75

Pld = Games Played, W = Games Won, D = Games Drawn, L = Games Lost, Tri = Tries Scored, Con = Conversions, Pen = Penalties, DG = Drop Goals, Pts = Points Scored

== Retirement ==
In April 2017, Evans announced his retirement from rugby after the 2016–17 Premiership season with Harlequins. His last home game for Quins was against Wasps on 28 April 2017.

Shortly after his retirement from playing, he was appointed as an attack coach for Quins.

== Coaching career ==
Since 2017, Evans has been attack coach with Harlequins. Whilst in this role, the team won the English Premiership during the 2020-21 season beating Exeter Chiefs 40–38 in the final.

In January 2023, prior to the 2023 Six Nations, Evans was appointed as attack for the England national team by Head Coach Steve Borthwick on a short-term deal. The campaign ended disappointingly with England finishing 4th. Evans was still under contract with Harlequins who decided it was 'unreasonable' to release him for another extended period with England. He returned to his position as attack coach with Harlequins following the end of the tournament. Harlequins announced in April 2026 that Evans would leave his role at the end of the season.
