= 2023 Rugby World Cup squads =

The 2023 Rugby World Cup was held in France from 8 September to 28 October 2023. Twenty teams qualified and each named an initial squad of 33 players, two more than at the previous World Cup. Squads were submitted before the tournament, and replacement players could be added during the tournament on injury grounds.

Note: The age and number of caps listed for each player is as of 8 September 2023, the first day of the tournament.

== Pool A ==
=== New Zealand ===
New Zealand announced their squad on 7 August 2023.

^{1} On 10 September 2023, Emoni Narawa was ruled out of the World Cup, after sustaining a back injury. He was replaced in the New Zealand squad by Ethan Blackadder.

Head coach: (New Zealand) Ian Foster

Player	Position	Date of birth (age)	Caps	Franchise/province
Dane Coles	Hooker	10 December 1986 (aged 36)	87	(New Zealand) Hurricanes / Wellington
Samisoni Taukei'aho	Hooker	8 August 1997 (aged 26)	25	(New Zealand) Chiefs / Waikato
Codie Taylor	Hooker	31 March 1991 (aged 32)	79	(New Zealand) Crusaders / Canterbury
Ethan de Groot	Prop	22 July 1998 (aged 25)	17	(New Zealand) Highlanders / Southland
Nepo Laulala	Prop	6 November 1991 (aged 31)	49	(New Zealand) Blues / Counties Manukau
Tyrel Lomax	Prop	16 March 1996 (aged 27)	27	(New Zealand) Hurricanes / Tasman
Fletcher Newell	Prop	1 March 2000 (aged 23)	8	(New Zealand) Crusaders / Canterbury
Ofa Tu'ungafasi	Prop	19 April 1992 (aged 31)	53	(New Zealand) Blues / Northland
Tamaiti Williams	Prop	10 August 2000 (aged 23)	3	(New Zealand) Crusaders / Canterbury
Scott Barrett	Lock	20 November 1993 (aged 29)	62	(New Zealand) Crusaders / Taranaki
Brodie Retallick	Lock	31 May 1991 (aged 32)	103	(New Zealand) Chiefs / Hawke's Bay
Tupou Vaa'i	Lock	27 January 2000 (aged 23)	22	(New Zealand) Chiefs / Taranaki
Sam Whitelock	Lock	12 October 1988 (aged 34)	146	(New Zealand) Crusaders / Canterbury
Ethan Blackadder ^{1}	Loose forward	22 March 1995 (aged 28)	9	(New Zealand) Crusaders / Tasman
Sam Cane (c)	Loose forward	13 January 1992 (aged 31)	90	(New Zealand) Chiefs / Bay of Plenty
Shannon Frizell	Loose forward	11 February 1994 (aged 29)	28	(New Zealand) Highlanders / Tasman
Luke Jacobson	Loose forward	20 April 1997 (aged 26)	15	(New Zealand) Chiefs / Waikato
Dalton Papalii	Loose forward	11 October 1997 (aged 25)	26	(New Zealand) Blues / Counties Manukau
Ardie Savea	Loose forward	14 October 1993 (aged 29)	75	(New Zealand) Hurricanes / Wellington
Finlay Christie	Scrum-half	19 September 1995 (aged 27)	17	(New Zealand) Blues / Tasman
Cam Roigard	Scrum-half	16 November 2000 (aged 22)	2	(New Zealand) Hurricanes / Counties Manukau
Aaron Smith	Scrum-half	21 November 1988 (aged 34)	119	(New Zealand) Highlanders / Manawatu
Beauden Barrett	Fly-half	27 May 1991 (aged 32)	116	(New Zealand) Blues / Taranaki
Damian McKenzie	Fly-half	20 April 1995 (aged 28)	42	(New Zealand) Chiefs / Waikato
Richie Mo'unga	Fly-half	25 May 1994 (aged 29)	49	(New Zealand) Crusaders / Canterbury
Jordie Barrett	Centre	17 February 1997 (aged 26)	52	(New Zealand) Hurricanes / Taranaki
David Havili	Centre	23 December 1994 (aged 28)	25	(New Zealand) Crusaders / Tasman
Rieko Ioane	Centre	18 March 1997 (aged 26)	63	(New Zealand) Blues / Auckland
Anton Lienert-Brown	Centre	15 April 1995 (aged 28)	63	(New Zealand) Chiefs / Waikato
Caleb Clarke	Wing	29 March 1999 (aged 24)	18	(New Zealand) Blues / Auckland
Leicester Fainga'anuku	Wing	11 October 1999 (aged 23)	3	(New Zealand) Crusaders / Tasman
Emoni Narawa ^{1}	Wing	13 July 1999 (aged 24)	1	(New Zealand) Chiefs / Bay of Plenty
Mark Tele'a	Wing	6 December 1996 (aged 26)	5	(New Zealand) Blues / North Harbour
Will Jordan	Fullback	24 February 1998 (aged 25)	25	(New Zealand) Crusaders / Tasman

=== France ===
France announced their squad on 21 August 2023.

^{1} On 1 September 2023, Paul Willemse was ruled out of the World Cup, after sustaining a thigh injury. He was replaced in the France squad by Bastien Chalureau

Head coach: (France) Fabien Galthié

Player	Position	Date of birth (age)	Caps	Club/province
Pierre Bourgarit	Hooker	12 September 1997 (aged 25)	10	(France) La Rochelle
Julien Marchand	Hooker	10 May 1995 (aged 28)	31	(France) Toulouse
Peato Mauvaka	Hooker	10 January 1997 (aged 26)	24	(France) Toulouse
Dorian Aldegheri	Prop	4 August 1993 (aged 30)	11	(France) Toulouse
Uini Atonio	Prop	26 March 1990 (aged 33)	53	(France) La Rochelle
Cyril Baille	Prop	15 September 1993 (aged 29)	44	(France) Toulouse
Sipili Falatea	Prop	6 June 1997 (aged 26)	13	(France) Bordeaux-Bègles
Jean-Baptiste Gros	Prop	29 May 1999 (aged 24)	25	(France) Toulon
Reda Wardi	Prop	2 August 1995 (aged 28)	9	(France) La Rochelle
Bastien Chalureau ^{1}	Lock	13 February 1992 (aged 31)	6	(France) Montpellier
Thibaud Flament	Lock	29 April 1997 (aged 26)	19	(France) Toulouse
Romain Taofifenua	Lock	14 September 1990 (aged 32)	44	(France) Lyon
Paul Willemse ^{1}	Lock	13 November 1992 (aged 30)	31	(France) Montpellier
Cameron Woki	Lock	7 November 1998 (aged 24)	22	(France) Racing 92
Grégory Alldritt	Back row	23 March 1997 (aged 26)	42	(France) La Rochelle
Paul Boudehent	Back row	21 November 1999 (aged 23)	3	(France) La Rochelle
François Cros	Back row	25 March 1994 (aged 29)	22	(France) Toulouse
Anthony Jelonch	Back row	28 July 1996 (aged 27)	25	(France) Toulouse
Sekou Macalou	Back row	20 April 1995 (aged 28)	18	(France) Stade Français
Charles Ollivon	Back row	11 May 1993 (aged 30)	35	(France) Toulon
Baptiste Couilloud	Scrum-half	22 August 1997 (aged 26)	13	(France) Lyon
Antoine Dupont (c)	Scrum-half	15 November 1996 (aged 26)	49	(France) Toulouse
Maxime Lucu	Scrum-half	12 January 1993 (aged 30)	15	(France) Bordeaux-Bègles
Antoine Hastoy	Fly-half	4 June 1997 (aged 26)	4	(France) La Rochelle
Matthieu Jalibert	Fly-half	6 November 1998 (aged 24)	26	(France) Bordeaux-Bègles
Jonathan Danty	Centre	7 October 1992 (aged 30)	23	(France) La Rochelle
Gaël Fickou	Centre	26 March 1994 (aged 29)	81	(France) Racing 92
Yoram Moefana	Centre	18 July 2000 (aged 23)	18	(France) Bordeaux-Bègles
Arthur Vincent	Centre	30 September 1999 (aged 23)	16	(France) Montpellier
Louis Bielle-Biarrey	Wing	16 June 2003 (aged 20)	3	(France) Bordeaux-Bègles
Damian Penaud	Wing	25 September 1996 (aged 26)	44	(France) Bordeaux-Bègles
Gabin Villière	Wing	13 December 1995 (aged 27)	14	(France) Toulon
Melvyn Jaminet	Fullback	30 June 1999 (aged 24)	15	(France) Toulouse
Thomas Ramos	Fullback	23 July 1995 (aged 28)	27	(France) Toulouse

=== Italy ===
Italy announced their squad on 22 August 2023.

^{1} On 24 September 2023, Luca Bigi was ruled out of the World Cup, after sustaining a leg injury. He was replaced in the Italy squad by Marco Manfredi.

^{2} On 1 October 2023, Paolo Buonfiglio was called up to replace the injured Danilo Fischetti .

Head coach: (New Zealand) Kieran Crowley

Player	Position	Date of birth (age)	Caps	Club/province
Luca Bigi ^{1}	Hooker	19 April 1991 (aged 32)	48	(Italy) Zebre Parma
Hame Faiva	Hooker	9 May 1994 (aged 29)	7	Unattached
Marco Manfredi ^{1}	Hooker	18 September 1997 (aged 25)	2	(Italy) Zebre Parma
Giacomo Nicotera	Hooker	15 July 1996 (aged 27)	15	(Italy) Benetton
Pietro Ceccarelli	Prop	16 February 1992 (aged 31)	29	(France) Perpignan
Simone Ferrari	Prop	28 March 1994 (aged 29)	47	(Italy) Benetton
Danilo Fischetti	Prop	26 January 1998 (aged 25)	33	(Italy) Zebre Parma
Ivan Nemer	Prop	22 April 1998 (aged 25)	13	(Italy) Benetton
Marco Riccioni	Prop	19 October 1997 (aged 25)	22	(England) Saracens
Federico Zani	Prop	9 April 1989 (aged 34)	23	(Italy) Benetton
Niccolò Cannone	Lock	17 May 1998 (aged 25)	33	(Italy) Benetton
Dino Lamb	Lock	18 April 1998 (aged 25)	3	(England) Harlequins
Federico Ruzza	Lock	4 August 1994 (aged 29)	45	(Italy) Benetton
Dave Sisi	Lock	5 February 1993 (aged 30)	28	(Italy) Zebre Parma
Lorenzo Cannone	Back row	28 January 2001 (aged 22)	12	(Italy) Benetton
Toa Halafihi	Back row	27 November 1993 (aged 29)	11	(Italy) Benetton
Michele Lamaro (c)	Back row	3 June 1998 (aged 25)	29	(Italy) Benetton
Sebastian Negri	Back row	30 June 1994 (aged 29)	48	(Italy) Benetton
Giovanni Pettinelli	Back row	13 March 1996 (aged 27)	14	(Italy) Benetton
Manuel Zuliani	Back row	26 April 2000 (aged 23)	13	(Italy) Benetton
Alessandro Fusco	Scrum-half	28 October 1999 (aged 23)	15	(Italy) Zebre Parma
Alessandro Garbisi	Scrum-half	11 April 2002 (aged 21)	6	(Italy) Benetton
Martin Page-Relo	Scrum-half	6 January 1999 (aged 24)	2	(France) Lyon
Stephen Varney	Scrum-half	16 May 2001 (aged 22)	21	(England) Gloucester
Tommaso Allan	Fly-half	26 April 1993 (aged 30)	75	(France) Perpignan
Giacomo Da Re	Fly-half	29 March 1999 (aged 24)	2	(Italy) Benetton
Paolo Garbisi	Fly-half	26 April 2000 (aged 23)	27	(France) Montpellier
Ignacio Brex	Centre	26 May 1992 (aged 31)	26	(Italy) Benetton
Luca Morisi	Centre	22 February 1991 (aged 32)	47	Unattached
Pierre Bruno	Wing	28 June 1996 (aged 27)	13	(Italy) Zebre Parma
Monty Ioane	Wing	30 October 1994 (aged 28)	21	(France) Lyon
Paolo Odogwu	Wing	18 June 1997 (aged 26)	3	(Italy) Benetton
Ange Capuozzo	Fullback	30 April 1999 (aged 24)	12	(France) Toulouse
Lorenzo Pani	Fullback	4 July 2002 (aged 21)	3	(Italy) Zebre Parma

=== Uruguay ===
Uruguay announced their final squad on 21 August 2023.

Head coach: (Argentina) Esteban Meneses

Player	Position	Date of birth (age)	Caps	Club/province
Facundo Gattas	Hooker	2 July 1995 (aged 28)	39	(United States) Old Glory DC
Germán Kessler	Hooker	1 July 1994 (aged 29)	62	(France) Provence
Guillermo Pujadas	Hooker	6 February 1997 (aged 26)	28	(Uruguay) Peñarol
Diego Arbelo	Prop	19 August 1994 (aged 29)	18	(Uruguay) Peñarol
Matías Benítez	Prop	16 May 1988 (aged 35)	45	(Uruguay) Peñarol
Ignacio Péculo	Prop	22 February 1999 (aged 24)	13	(Uruguay) Peñarol
Reinaldo Piussi	Prop	18 May 1999 (aged 24)	4	(Uruguay) Peñarol
Mateo Sanguinetti	Prop	26 July 1992 (aged 31)	80	(Uruguay) Peñarol
Felipe Aliaga	Lock	14 September 1999 (aged 23)	5	(Uruguay) Peñarol
Ignacio Dotti	Lock	18 August 1994 (aged 29)	59	(Uruguay) Peñarol
Manuel Leindekar	Lock	23 April 1997 (aged 26)	28	(France) Bayonne
Juan Manuel Rodríguez	Lock	15 December 1996 (aged 26)	3	(Uruguay) Peñarol
Manuel Ardao	Back row	9 September 1998 (aged 24)	23	(Uruguay) Peñarol
Lucas Bianchi	Back row	26 March 2001 (aged 22)	10	(Uruguay) Peñarol
Santiago Civetta	Back row	28 February 1998 (aged 25)	26	(Uruguay) Peñarol
Carlos Deus	Back row	5 July 2001 (aged 22)	3	(Uruguay) Peñarol
Manuel Diana	Back row	7 March 1996 (aged 27)	38	(Uruguay) Peñarol
Eric Dosantos	Back row	25 February 1995 (aged 28)	16	(Uruguay) Peñarol
Santiago Álvarez	Scrum-half	24 December 2001 (aged 21)	7	(Uruguay) Peñarol
Santiago Arata	Scrum-half	2 September 1996 (aged 27)	45	(France) Castres
Agustín Ormaechea	Scrum-half	8 March 1991 (aged 32)	56	(France) Nice
Felipe Berchesi	Fly-half	12 April 1991 (aged 32)	45	(France) Dax
Felipe Etcheverry	Fly-half	23 June 1996 (aged 27)	20	(Uruguay) Peñarol
Felipe Arcos Pérez	Centre	17 May 2001 (aged 22)	9	(Uruguay) Old Boys
Tomás Inciarte	Centre	22 October 1996 (aged 26)	32	(Uruguay) Peñarol
Andrés Vilaseca (c)	Centre	8 May 1991 (aged 32)	75	(France) Vannes
Juan Manuel Alonso	Wing	19 September 2001 (aged 21)	8	(Uruguay) Peñarol
Bautista Basso	Wing	18 January 2001 (aged 22)	4	(Uruguay) Old Boys
Ignacio Facciolo	Wing	28 December 1998 (aged 24)	1	(Uruguay) Círculo de Tenis
Nicolás Freitas	Wing	3 July 1993 (aged 30)	50	(France) Vannes
Gastón Mieres	Wing	5 October 1989 (aged 33)	82	(Uruguay) Peñarol
Baltazar Amaya	Fullback	26 May 1999 (aged 24)	8	(Uruguay) Old Boys
Rodrigo Silva	Fullback	2 November 1992 (aged 30)	77	(Uruguay) Peñarol

=== Namibia ===
Namibia announced their squad on 28 August 2023.

^{1} On 6 September 2023, Chad Plato was ruled out of the World Cup, after sustaining a thigh injury. He was replaced in the Namibia squad by TC Kisting.

^{2} On 17 September 2023, Le Roux Malan was ruled out of the World Cup, after sustaining an ankle injury. He was replaced in the Namibia squad by Lloyd Jacobs.

Head coach: (South Africa) Allister Coetzee

Player	Position	Date of birth (age)	Caps	Club/province
Obert Nortjé	Hooker	17 April 1997 (aged 26)	21	(Namibia) Wanderers
Torsten van Jaarsveld	Hooker	30 June 1987 (aged 36)	19	(France) Bayonne
Louis van der Westhuizen	Hooker	25 February 1995 (aged 28)	29	(South Africa) Cheetahs
Jason Benade	Prop	16 April 1995 (aged 28)	13	University of Namibia
Aranos Coetzee	Prop	14 March 1988 (aged 35)	29	(South Africa) Cheetahs
Des Sethie	Prop	9 December 1992 (aged 30)	17	University of Namibia
Haitembu Shikufa	Prop	28 November 2000 (aged 22)	1	(South Africa) Leopards
Casper Viviers	Prop	1 June 1988 (aged 35)	41	(France) La Baule
Tiaan de Klerk	Lock	12 June 2001 (aged 22)	1	(Italy) Mogliano
Adriaan Ludick	Lock	22 July 1998 (aged 25)	9	(France) Limoges
Mahepisa Tjeriko	Lock	6 May 1993 (aged 30)	11	University of Namibia
Tjiuee Uanivi	Lock	31 December 1990 (aged 32)	34	(France) Montauban
P. J. van Lill	Lock	4 December 1983 (aged 39)	60	(France) Capbreton Hossegor
Adriaan Booysen	Back row	17 May 1996 (aged 27)	24	(United States) Dallas Jackals
Wian Conradie	Back row	14 October 1994 (aged 28)	28	(United States) New England Free Jacks
Prince ǃGaoseb	Back row	7 July 1998 (aged 25)	12	(Israel) Tel Aviv Heat
Richard Hardwick	Back row	31 May 1994 (aged 29)	3	(Australia) Melbourne Rebels
Max Katjijeko	Back row	8 April 1995 (aged 28)	21	(Israel) Tel Aviv Heat
Johan Retief	Back row	10 October 1995 (aged 27)	21	(South Africa) Griquas
Oela Blaauw	Scrum-half	17 October 2001 (aged 21)	0	(South Africa) University of Johannesburg
TC Kisting ^{1}	Scrum-half	13 January 1994 (aged 29)	18	(Romania) Dinamo București
Damian Stevens	Scrum-half	2 June 1995 (aged 28)	36	(United States) New Orleans Gold
Jacques Theron	Scrum-half	22 March 1999 (aged 24)	3	(Namibia) Wanderers
Cliven Loubser	Fly-half	24 February 1997 (aged 26)	24	(United States) Utah Warriors
Tiaan Swanepoel	Fly-half	4 June 1996 (aged 27)	2	(France) Valence-d'Agen
André van den Berg	Fly-half	28 November 1999 (aged 23)	4	(Namibia) Wanderers
Danco Burger	Centre	28 July 1998 (aged 25)	5	(Namibia) Wanderers
Johan Deysel (c)	Centre	26 September 1991 (aged 31)	35	(France) Colomiers
Alcino Izaacs	Centre	16 November 1993 (aged 29)	3	(South Africa) Boland Cavaliers
Lloyd Jacobs ^{2}	Centre	17 February 1993 (aged 30)	0	(Namibia) Kudus
Le Roux Malan ^{2}	Centre	31 March 1999 (aged 24)	2	(United States) New England Free Jacks
JC Greyling	Wing	21 June 1991 (aged 32)	42	(Namibia) Wanderers
Gerswin Mouton	Wing	16 December 1999 (aged 23)	3	(South Africa) Wits University
Chad Plato ^{1}	Fullback	21 April 1998 (aged 25)	4	(Namibia) Kudus
Divan Rossouw	Fullback	12 March 1996 (aged 27)	6	(Russia) Krasny Yar

== Pool B ==
=== South Africa ===
South Africa announced their squad on 8 August 2023.

^{1} On 14 September 2023, Malcolm Marx was ruled out of the World Cup, after sustaining a knee injury. He was replaced in the South Africa squad by Handré Pollard.

^{2} On 2 October 2023, Makazole Mapimpi was ruled out of the World Cup, after sustaining a fractured eye socket. He was replaced in the South Africa squad by Lukhanyo Am.

Head coach: (South Africa) Jacques Nienaber

Player	Position	Date of birth (age)	Caps	Club/province
Malcolm Marx ^{1}	Hooker	13 July 1994 (aged 29)	63	(Japan) Kubota Spears
Bongi Mbonambi	Hooker	7 January 1991 (aged 32)	62	(South Africa) Sharks
Steven Kitshoff	Prop	10 February 1992 (aged 31)	76	(Ireland) Ulster
Vincent Koch	Prop	13 March 1990 (aged 33)	46	(South Africa) Sharks
Frans Malherbe	Prop	14 March 1991 (aged 32)	63	(South Africa) Stormers
Ox Nché	Prop	23 July 1995 (aged 28)	21	(South Africa) Sharks
Trevor Nyakane	Prop	4 May 1989 (aged 34)	62	(France) Racing 92
Eben Etzebeth	Lock	29 October 1991 (aged 31)	113	(South Africa) Sharks
Jean Kleyn	Lock	26 August 1993 (aged 30)	4	(Ireland) Munster
Franco Mostert	Lock	27 November 1990 (aged 32)	67	(Japan) Mie Honda Heat
Marvin Orie	Lock	15 February 1993 (aged 30)	14	(France) Perpignan
RG Snyman	Lock	29 January 1995 (aged 28)	28	(Ireland) Munster
Pieter-Steph du Toit	Loose forward	20 August 1992 (aged 31)	71	(Japan) Toyota Verblitz
Deon Fourie	Loose forward	25 September 1986 (aged 36)	7	(South Africa) Stormers
Siya Kolisi (c)	Loose forward	16 June 1991 (aged 32)	77	(France) Racing 92
Kwagga Smith	Loose forward	11 June 1993 (aged 30)	34	(Japan) Shizuoka Blue Revs
Marco van Staden	Loose forward	25 August 1995 (aged 28)	14	(South Africa) Bulls
Duane Vermeulen	Loose forward	3 July 1986 (aged 37)	70	Unattached
Jasper Wiese	Loose forward	21 October 1995 (aged 27)	23	(England) Leicester Tigers
Faf de Klerk	Scrum-half	19 October 1991 (aged 31)	49	(Japan) Yokohama Canon Eagles
Jaden Hendrikse	Scrum-half	23 March 2000 (aged 23)	13	(South Africa) Sharks
Cobus Reinach	Scrum-half	7 February 1990 (aged 33)	26	(France) Montpellier
Grant Williams	Scrum-half	22 July 1996 (aged 27)	5	(South Africa) Sharks
Manie Libbok	Fly-half	15 July 1997 (aged 26)	9	(South Africa) Stormers
Handré Pollard ^{1}	Fly-half	11 March 1994 (aged 29)	65	(England) Leicester Tigers
Damian Willemse	Fly-half	7 May 1998 (aged 25)	33	(South Africa) Stormers
Lukhanyo Am ^{2}	Centre	28 November 1993 (aged 29)	35	(South Africa) Sharks
Damian de Allende	Centre	25 November 1991 (aged 31)	73	(Japan) Saitama Wild Knights
André Esterhuizen	Centre	30 March 1994 (aged 29)	14	(England) Harlequins
Jesse Kriel	Centre	15 February 1994 (aged 29)	62	(Japan) Yokohama Canon Eagles
Kurt-Lee Arendse	Wing	17 June 1996 (aged 27)	10	(South Africa) Bulls
Cheslin Kolbe	Wing	28 October 1993 (aged 29)	26	(Japan) Tokyo Sungoliath
Makazole Mapimpi ^{2}	Wing	26 July 1990 (aged 33)	39	(South Africa) Sharks
Canan Moodie	Wing	5 November 2002 (aged 20)	8	(South Africa) Bulls
Willie le Roux	Fullback	18 August 1989 (aged 34)	87	(South Africa) Bulls

=== Ireland ===
Ireland announced their final squad on 27 August 2023.

Head coach: (England) Andy Farrell

Player	Position	Date of birth (age)	Caps	Club/province
Rob Herring	Hooker	28 April 1990 (aged 33)	37	(Ireland) Ulster
Rónan Kelleher	Hooker	24 January 1998 (aged 25)	21	(Ireland) Leinster
Dan Sheehan	Hooker	17 September 1998 (aged 24)	18	(Ireland) Leinster
Finlay Bealham	Prop	9 October 1991 (aged 31)	32	(Ireland) Connacht
Tadhg Furlong	Prop	14 November 1992 (aged 30)	67	(Ireland) Leinster
Dave Kilcoyne	Prop	14 December 1988 (aged 34)	52	(Ireland) Munster
Jeremy Loughman	Prop	22 July 1995 (aged 28)	3	(Ireland) Munster
Tom O'Toole	Prop	23 September 1998 (aged 24)	11	(Ireland) Ulster
Andrew Porter	Prop	16 January 1996 (aged 27)	54	(Ireland) Leinster
Ryan Baird	Lock	26 July 1999 (aged 24)	13	(Ireland) Leinster
Tadhg Beirne	Lock	8 January 1992 (aged 31)	41	(Ireland) Munster
Iain Henderson	Lock	21 February 1992 (aged 31)	74	(Ireland) Ulster
Joe McCarthy	Lock	26 March 2001 (aged 22)	3	(Ireland) Leinster
James Ryan	Lock	24 July 1996 (aged 27)	55	(Ireland) Leinster
Jack Conan	Back row	29 July 1992 (aged 31)	39	(Ireland) Leinster
Caelan Doris	Back row	2 April 1998 (aged 25)	31	(Ireland) Leinster
Peter O'Mahony	Back row	17 September 1989 (aged 33)	96	(Ireland) Munster
Josh van der Flier	Back row	25 April 1993 (aged 30)	52	(Ireland) Leinster
Craig Casey	Scrum-half	19 April 1999 (aged 24)	12	(Ireland) Munster
Jamison Gibson-Park	Scrum-half	23 February 1992 (aged 31)	26	(Ireland) Leinster
Conor Murray	Scrum-half	20 April 1989 (aged 34)	106	(Ireland) Munster
Ross Byrne	Fly-half	8 April 1995 (aged 28)	21	(Ireland) Leinster
Jack Crowley	Fly-half	13 January 2000 (aged 23)	6	(Ireland) Munster
Johnny Sexton (c)	Fly-half	11 July 1985 (aged 38)	113	Unattached
Bundee Aki	Centre	7 April 1990 (aged 33)	47	(Ireland) Connacht
Robbie Henshaw	Centre	12 June 1993 (aged 30)	64	(Ireland) Leinster
Stuart McCloskey	Centre	6 August 1992 (aged 31)	13	(Ireland) Ulster
Garry Ringrose	Centre	26 January 1995 (aged 28)	51	(Ireland) Leinster
Keith Earls	Wing	2 October 1987 (aged 35)	100	(Ireland) Munster
Mack Hansen	Wing	27 March 1998 (aged 25)	16	(Ireland) Connacht
James Lowe	Wing	8 July 1992 (aged 31)	21	(Ireland) Leinster
Hugo Keenan	Fullback	18 June 1996 (aged 27)	31	(Ireland) Leinster
Jimmy O'Brien	Fullback	27 November 1996 (aged 26)	6	(Ireland) Leinster

=== Scotland ===
Scotland announced their squad on 16 August 2023.

^{1} On 14 September 2023, Dave Cherry was ruled out of the World Cup, after a concussion injury. He was replaced by Stuart McInally.

^{2} On 24 September 2023, Stuart McInally was replaced by Johnny Matthews, after a neck injury.

Head coach: (Scotland) Gregor Townsend

Player	Position	Date of birth (age)	Caps	Club/province
Ewan Ashman	Hooker	3 April 2000 (aged 23)	9	(Scotland) Edinburgh
Dave Cherry ^{1}	Hooker	3 January 1991 (aged 32)	10	(Scotland) Edinburgh
Johnny Matthews ^{2}	Hooker	5 July 1993 (aged 30)	0	(Scotland) Glasgow Warriors
Stuart McInally ^{1,} ^{2}	Hooker	9 August 1990 (aged 33)	49	(Scotland) Edinburgh
George Turner	Hooker	8 October 1992 (aged 30)	37	(Scotland) Glasgow Warriors
Jamie Bhatti	Prop	8 September 1993 (aged 30)	32	(Scotland) Glasgow Warriors
Zander Fagerson	Prop	19 January 1996 (aged 27)	59	(Scotland) Glasgow Warriors
WP Nel	Prop	30 April 1986 (aged 37)	56	(Scotland) Edinburgh
Pierre Schoeman	Prop	7 May 1994 (aged 29)	23	(Scotland) Edinburgh
Javan Sebastian	Prop	2 September 1994 (aged 29)	6	(Scotland) Edinburgh
Rory Sutherland	Prop	24 August 1992 (aged 31)	25	Unattached
Scott Cummings	Lock	3 December 1996 (aged 26)	29	(Scotland) Glasgow Warriors
Grant Gilchrist	Lock	9 August 1990 (aged 33)	65	(Scotland) Edinburgh
Richie Gray	Lock	24 August 1989 (aged 34)	75	(Scotland) Glasgow Warriors
Sam Skinner	Lock	31 January 1995 (aged 28)	28	(Scotland) Edinburgh
Luke Crosbie	Back row	22 April 1997 (aged 26)	5	(Scotland) Edinburgh
Rory Darge	Back row	23 February 2000 (aged 23)	11	(Scotland) Glasgow Warriors
Jack Dempsey	Back row	12 April 1994 (aged 29)	12	(Scotland) Glasgow Warriors
Matt Fagerson	Back row	16 July 1998 (aged 25)	36	(Scotland) Glasgow Warriors
Jamie Ritchie (c)	Back row	16 August 1996 (aged 27)	43	(Scotland) Edinburgh
Hamish Watson	Back row	15 October 1991 (aged 31)	58	(Scotland) Edinburgh
George Horne	Scrum-half	12 May 1995 (aged 28)	23	(Scotland) Glasgow Warriors
Ali Price	Scrum-half	12 May 1993 (aged 30)	63	(Scotland) Glasgow Warriors
Ben White	Scrum-half	27 May 1998 (aged 25)	17	(France) Toulon
Ben Healy	Fly-half	29 June 1999 (aged 24)	3	(Scotland) Edinburgh
Finn Russell	Fly-half	23 September 1992 (aged 30)	72	(England) Bath
Chris Harris	Centre	28 December 1990 (aged 32)	44	(England) Gloucester
Huw Jones	Centre	17 December 1993 (aged 29)	39	(Scotland) Glasgow Warriors
Cameron Redpath	Centre	23 December 1999 (aged 23)	7	(England) Bath
Sione Tuipulotu	Centre	12 February 1997 (aged 26)	19	(Scotland) Glasgow Warriors
Darcy Graham	Wing	21 June 1997 (aged 26)	35	(Scotland) Edinburgh
Kyle Steyn	Wing	29 January 1994 (aged 29)	13	(Scotland) Glasgow Warriors
Duhan van der Merwe	Wing	4 June 1995 (aged 28)	31	(Scotland) Edinburgh
Blair Kinghorn	Fullback	18 January 1997 (aged 26)	46	(Scotland) Edinburgh
Ollie Smith	Fullback	7 August 2000 (aged 23)	6	(Scotland) Glasgow Warriors

=== Tonga ===
Tonga announced their final squad on 21 August 2023.

^{1} On 18 September 2023, Feao Fotuaika and Otumaka Mausia were ruled out of the World Cup, after sustaining various injuries. They were replaced in the Tonga squad by Siate Tokolahi and Patrick Pellegrini.

^{2} On 29 September 2023, Siua Maile and Solomone Funaki were ruled out of the World Cup, after sustaining various injuries. They were replaced in the Tonga squad by Sione Angaʻaelangi and Penitoa Finau.

Head coach: (Australia) Toutai Kefu

Player	Position	Date of birth (age)	Caps	Club/province
Sione Angaʻaelangi^{2}	Hooker	7 November 1988 (aged 34)	5	(France) Stade Niçois
Siua Maile^{2}	Hooker	18 February 1997 (aged 26)	15	(Italy) Benetton
Sam Moli	Hooker	24 December 1998 (aged 24)	13	(New Zealand) Moana Pasifika
Paul Ngauamo	Hooker	19 February 1990 (aged 33)	27	(France) Castres
Joe Apikotoa	Prop	18 July 1996 (aged 27)	3	(New Zealand) Moana Pasifika
Siegfried Fisiʻihoi	Prop	8 June 1987 (aged 36)	23	(France) Pau
Feao Fotuaika ^{1}	Prop	23 April 1993 (aged 30)	5	(France) Lyon
Tau Koloamatangi	Prop	3 January 1995 (aged 28)	7	(New Zealand) Moana Pasifika
Paula Latu	Prop	14 February 1996 (aged 27)	1	(New Zealand) Southland
Ben Tameifuna	Prop	30 August 1991 (aged 32)	29	(France) Bordeaux
Siate Tokolahi ^{1}	Prop	16 March 1992 (aged 31)	3	(France) Pau
Adam Coleman	Lock	7 October 1991 (aged 31)	0	(France) Bordeaux
Leva Fifita	Lock	29 July 1989 (aged 34)	31	(Ireland) Connacht
Sam Lousi	Lock	20 July 1991 (aged 32)	13	(Wales) Scarlets
Steve Mafi	Lock	9 December 1989 (aged 33)	41	(France) Oyonnax
Semisi Paea	Lock	17 April 1999 (aged 24)	3	(United States) New England Free Jacks
Vaea Fifita	Back row	17 June 1992 (aged 31)	9	(Wales) Scarlets
Penitoa Finau^{2}	Back row	17 December 1993 (aged 29)	0	(New Zealand) Moana Pasifika
Solomone Funaki^{2}	Back row	25 April 1994 (aged 29)	7	(New Zealand) Moana Pasifika
Tanginoa Halaifonua	Back row	20 September 1996 (aged 26)	13	(France) Stade Français
Sione Havili Talitui	Back row	25 January 1998 (aged 25)	9	(New Zealand) Crusaders
Sione Vailanu	Back row	27 January 1995 (aged 28)	12	(Scotland) Glasgow Warriors
Manu Paea	Scrum-half	17 September 2001 (aged 21)	9	(New Zealand) Moana Pasifika
Augustine Pulu	Scrum-half	4 January 1990 (aged 33)	3	(Japan) Hino Red Dolphins
Sonatane Takulua (c)	Scrum-half	11 January 1991 (aged 32)	52	(France) Agen
William Havili	Fly-half	9 September 1998 (aged 24)	9	(New Zealand) Moana Pasifika
Otumaka Mausia ^{1}	Fly-half	22 April 1997 (aged 26)	11	(Australia) Western Sydney Two Blues
Patrick Pellegrini ^{1}	Fly-half	28 September 1998 (aged 24)	3	(England) Coventry
Pita Ahki	Centre	24 September 1992 (aged 30)	4	(France) Toulouse
Malakai Fekitoa	Centre	10 May 1992 (aged 31)	8	(Italy) Benetton
George Moala	Centre	5 November 1990 (aged 32)	5	(France) Clermont
Afusipa Taumoepeau	Centre	26 January 1990 (aged 33)	12	(France) Perpignan
Fine Inisi	Wing	19 May 1998 (aged 25)	7	(New Zealand) Moana Pasifika
Solomone Kata	Wing	3 December 1994 (aged 28)	9	(England) Leicester Tigers
Kyren Taumoefolau	Wing	8 May 2003 (aged 20)	5	(New Zealand) Moana Pasifika
Anzelo Tuitavuki	Wing	10 October 1998 (aged 24)	7	(New Zealand) Moana Pasifika
Charles Piutau	Fullback	31 October 1991 (aged 31)	5	(Japan) Shizuoka Blue Revs

=== Romania ===
Romania announced their squad on 16 August 2023.

^{1} On 28 August 2023, Mihai Macovei, Mihai Mureșan and Paul Popoaia were replaced by André Gorin, Sioeli Lama and Taliaʻuli Sikuea due to injuries.

^{2} On 19 September 2023, Romania replaced Gabriel Pop, Taylor Gontineac and Hinckley Vaovasa with Luca Nichitean, Mihai Graure and Alexandru Bucur because of various injuries.

Head coach: (Romania) Eugen Apjok

Player	Position	Date of birth (age)	Caps	Club/province
Florin Bărdașu	Hooker	23 September 1991 (aged 31)	12	(Romania) Steaua București
Ovidiu Cojocaru	Hooker	19 November 1996 (aged 26)	32	(Romania) Dinamo București
Robert Irimescu	Hooker	1 March 1996 (aged 27)	4	(Romania) Știința Baia Mare
Costel Burțilă	Prop	14 July 1991 (aged 32)	13	(France) Hyères Carqueiranne
Thomas Crețu	Prop	5 March 2002 (aged 21)	5	(France) Aurillac
Gheorghe Gajion	Prop	13 November 1992 (aged 30)	9	(France) Mont-de-Marsan
Alexandru Gordaș	Prop	11 May 1994 (aged 29)	35	(Romania) Dinamo București
Iulian Harțig	Prop	11 October 1998 (aged 24)	9	(France) Bassin d'Arcachon
Alexandru Savin	Prop	12 February 1995 (aged 28)	25	(Romania) Steaua București
Ștefan Iancu	Lock	1 July 1998 (aged 25)	5	(Romania) Știința Baia Mare
Marius Iftimiciuc	Lock	13 August 1997 (aged 26)	22	(France) Carcassonne
Adrian Moțoc	Lock	11 July 1996 (aged 27)	27	(France) Biarritz
Cristi Boboc	Back row	9 October 1995 (aged 27)	9	(Romania) Steaua București
Cristi Chirică (c)	Back row	9 April 1997 (aged 26)	34	(Romania) Dinamo București
André Gorin ^{1}	Back row	30 November 1987 (aged 35)	44	(France) Hyères Carqueiranne
Mihai Macovei ^{1}	Back row	29 October 1986 (aged 36)	104	(France) Bassin d'Arcachon
Vlad Neculau	Back row	7 January 1998 (aged 25)	14	(Romania) Timișoara
Florian Roșu	Back row	20 April 1993 (aged 30)	13	(Romania) Știința Baia Mare
Dragoș Ser	Back row	4 March 1999 (aged 24)	15	(Romania) Steaua București
Damian Strătilă	Back row	28 July 1996 (aged 27)	6	(Romania) Steaua București
Alin Conache	Scrum-half	7 May 2002 (aged 21)	5	(Romania) Timișoara
Gabriel Rupanu	Scrum-half	28 September 1997 (aged 25)	21	(Romania) Timișoara
Florin Surugiu	Scrum-half	10 December 1984 (aged 38)	103	(Romania) Steaua București
Tudor Boldor	Fly-half	29 November 1997 (aged 25)	16	(Romania) Dinamo București
Mihai Mureșan ^{1}	Fly-half	2 October 2002 (aged 20)	3	(Romania) Știința Baia Mare
Luca Nichitean ^{2}	Fly-half	29 June 1999 (aged 24)	0	(Romania) Știința Baia Mare
Gabriel Pop ^{2}	Fly-half	29 March 1998 (aged 25)	5	(Romania) Dinamo București
Alexandru Bucur ^{2}	Centre	24 April 1994 (aged 29)	15	(Romania) Știința Baia Mare
Taylor Gontineac ^{2}	Centre	16 July 2000 (aged 23)	10	(France) Rouen
Mihai Graure ^{2}	Centre		0	(Romania) Dinamo București
Tevita Manumua	Centre	12 February 1993 (aged 30)	2	(Romania) Timișoara
Taliaʻuli Sikuea ^{1}	Centre	14 July 1995 (aged 28)	1	(Romania) Știința Baia Mare
Jason Tomane	Centre	4 March 1995 (aged 28)	14	(Romania) Știința Baia Mare
Sioeli Lama ^{1}	Wing	12 October 1995 (aged 27)	6	(Romania) Steaua București
Nicolas Onuțu	Wing	27 December 1995 (aged 27)	27	(France) Annonay
Marius Simionescu	Wing	5 September 1997 (aged 26)	30	(Romania) Timișoara
Fonovai Tangimana	Wing	25 October 1989 (aged 33)	22	(Romania) Steaua București
Paul Popoaia ^{1}	Fullback	29 May 2000 (aged 23)	12	(Romania) Știința Baia Mare
Hinckley Vaovasa ^{2}	Fullback	24 September 1998 (aged 24)	18	(Romania) Steaua București

== Pool C ==
=== Wales ===
Wales announced their final squad on 21 August 2023.

^{1} On 7 October 2023, Taulupe Faletau was ruled out of the World Cup, after sustaining a broken arm. He was replaced in the Wales squad by Kieran Hardy.

Head coach: (New Zealand) Warren Gatland

Player	Position	Date of birth (age)	Caps	Club/province
Elliot Dee	Hooker	7 March 1994 (aged 29)	43	(Wales) Dragons
Ryan Elias	Hooker	7 January 1995 (aged 28)	34	(Wales) Scarlets
Dewi Lake (cc)	Hooker	16 May 1999 (aged 24)	9	(Wales) Ospreys
Corey Domachowski	Prop	9 November 1996 (aged 26)	2	(Wales) Cardiff
Tomas Francis	Prop	27 April 1992 (aged 31)	72	(France) Provence
Dillon Lewis	Prop	4 January 1996 (aged 27)	51	(England) Harlequins
Nicky Smith	Prop	7 April 1994 (aged 29)	44	(Wales) Ospreys
Gareth Thomas	Prop	2 August 1993 (aged 30)	22	(Wales) Ospreys
Henry Thomas	Prop	30 October 1991 (aged 31)	2	(France) Montpellier
Adam Beard	Lock	7 January 1996 (aged 27)	47	(Wales) Ospreys
Dafydd Jenkins	Lock	5 December 2002 (aged 20)	7	(England) Exeter Chiefs
Will Rowlands	Lock	19 September 1991 (aged 31)	25	(France) Racing 92
Christ Tshiunza	Lock	9 January 2002 (aged 21)	7	(England) Exeter Chiefs
Taine Basham	Back row	22 February 1999 (aged 24)	13	(Wales) Dragons
Taulupe Faletau ^{1}	Back row	12 November 1990 (aged 32)	100	(Wales) Cardiff
Dan Lydiate	Back row	18 December 1988 (aged 34)	71	(Wales) Dragons
Jac Morgan (cc)	Back row	21 January 2000 (aged 23)	11	(Wales) Ospreys
Tommy Reffell	Back row	27 April 1999 (aged 24)	10	(England) Leicester Tigers
Aaron Wainwright	Back row	25 September 1997 (aged 25)	39	(Wales) Dragons
Gareth Davies	Scrum-half	18 August 1990 (aged 33)	69	(Wales) Scarlets
Kieran Hardy ^{1}	Scrum-half	30 November 1995 (aged 27)	18	(Wales) Scarlets
Tomos Williams	Scrum-half	1 January 1995 (aged 28)	48	(Wales) Cardiff
Gareth Anscombe	Fly-half	10 May 1991 (aged 32)	35	(Japan) Tokyo Sungoliath
Dan Biggar	Fly-half	16 October 1989 (aged 33)	109	(France) Toulon
Sam Costelow	Fly-half	10 January 2001 (aged 22)	4	(Wales) Scarlets
Mason Grady	Centre	29 March 2002 (aged 21)	4	(Wales) Cardiff
George North	Centre	13 April 1992 (aged 31)	114	(Wales) Ospreys
Nick Tompkins	Centre	16 February 1995 (aged 28)	28	(England) Saracens
Johnny Williams	Centre	18 October 1996 (aged 26)	6	(Wales) Scarlets
Josh Adams	Wing	21 April 1995 (aged 28)	50	(Wales) Cardiff
Rio Dyer	Wing	21 December 1999 (aged 23)	9	(Wales) Dragons
Louis Rees-Zammit	Wing	2 February 2001 (aged 22)	27	(England) Gloucester
Leigh Halfpenny	Fullback	22 December 1988 (aged 34)	100	Unattached
Liam Williams	Fullback	9 April 1991 (aged 32)	85	(Japan) Kubota Spears

=== Australia ===
Australia announced their final squad on 10 August 2023.

^{1} On 21 September 2023, Max Jorgensen was ruled out of the World Cup, after sustaining a broken leg.

Head coach: (Australia) Eddie Jones

Player	Position	Date of birth (age)	Caps	Club/province
Matt Faessler	Hooker	21 December 1998 (aged 24)	2	(Australia) Queensland Reds
Dave Porecki	Hooker	23 October 1992 (aged 30)	15	(Australia) NSW Waratahs
Jordan Uelese	Hooker	24 January 1997 (aged 26)	18	(Australia) Melbourne Rebels
Angus Bell	Prop	4 October 2000 (aged 22)	24	(Australia) NSW Waratahs
Pone Fa'amausili	Prop	26 February 1997 (aged 26)	5	(Australia) Melbourne Rebels
Zane Nonggorr	Prop	30 March 2001 (aged 22)	3	(Australia) Queensland Reds
Blake Schoupp	Prop	28 March 1998 (aged 25)	1	(Australia) ACT Brumbies
James Slipper	Prop	6 June 1989 (aged 34)	131	(Australia) ACT Brumbies
Taniela Tupou	Prop	10 May 1996 (aged 27)	49	(Australia) Queensland Reds
Richie Arnold	Lock	1 July 1990 (aged 33)	5	(France) Toulouse
Nick Frost	Lock	10 October 1999 (aged 23)	12	(Australia) ACT Brumbies
Matt Philip	Lock	7 March 1994 (aged 29)	29	(Australia) Melbourne Rebels
Will Skelton (cc)	Lock	3 May 1992 (aged 31)	29	(France) La Rochelle
Langi Gleeson	Back row	21 July 2001 (aged 22)	4	(Australia) NSW Waratahs
Tom Hooper	Back row	1 January 2002 (aged 21)	4	(Australia) ACT Brumbies
Josh Kemeny	Back row	29 November 1998 (aged 24)	1	(Australia) Melbourne Rebels
Rob Leota	Back row	3 March 1997 (aged 26)	17	(Australia) Melbourne Rebels
Fraser McReight	Back row	19 February 1999 (aged 24)	13	(Australia) Queensland Reds
Rob Valetini	Back row	3 September 1998 (aged 25)	35	(Australia) ACT Brumbies
Issak Fines-Leleiwasa	Scrum-half	2 October 1995 (aged 27)	1	(Australia) Western Force
Tate McDermott (cc)	Scrum-half	18 September 1998 (aged 24)	26	(Australia) Queensland Reds
Nic White	Scrum-half	13 June 1990 (aged 33)	63	(Australia) ACT Brumbies
Carter Gordon	Fly-half	29 January 2001 (aged 22)	5	(Australia) Melbourne Rebels
Ben Donaldson	Fly-half	5 April 1999 (aged 24)	3	(Australia) NSW Waratahs
Lalakai Foketi	Centre	22 December 1994 (aged 28)	6	(Australia) NSW Waratahs
Samu Kerevi	Centre	27 September 1993 (aged 29)	45	(Japan) Tokyo Sungoliath
Izaia Perese	Centre	17 May 1997 (aged 26)	5	(Australia) NSW Waratahs
Jordan Petaia	Centre	14 March 2000 (aged 23)	28	(Australia) Queensland Reds
Max Jorgensen ^{1}	Wing	2 September 2004 (aged 19)	0	(Australia) NSW Waratahs
Marika Koroibete	Wing	26 July 1992 (aged 31)	55	(Japan) Saitama Wild Knights
Mark Nawaqanitawase	Wing	11 September 2000 (aged 22)	7	(Australia) NSW Waratahs
Suliasi Vunivalu	Wing	27 November 1995 (aged 27)	3	(Australia) Queensland Reds
Andrew Kellaway	Fullback	12 October 1995 (aged 27)	24	(Australia) Melbourne Rebels

=== Fiji ===
Fiji announced their squad on 8 August 2023.

^{1} On 1 September 2023, Caleb Muntz was ruled out of the World Cup, after sustaining a knee injury. He was replaced in the Fiji squad by Vilimoni Botitu.

^{2} On 25 September 2023, Jone Koroiduadua was ruled out of the Rugby World Cup, after sustaining an injury. He was replaced in the Fiji squad by Emosi Tuqiri.

^{3} On 11 October 2023, Temo Mayanavanua was ruled out of the Rugby World Cup, after sustaining an injury. He was replaced in the Fiji squad by Api Ratuniyarawa.

Head coach: (Fiji) Simon Raiwalui

Player	Position	Date of birth (age)	Caps	Club/province
Tevita Ikanivere	Hooker	6 September 1999 (aged 24)	8	(Fiji) Fijian Drua
Sam Matavesi	Hooker	13 January 1992 (aged 31)	26	(England) Northampton Saints
Zuriel Togiatama	Hooker	3 February 1999 (aged 24)	3	(Fiji) Fijian Drua
Mesake Doge	Prop	1 April 1993 (aged 30)	10	(Fiji) Fijian Drua
Jone Koroiduadua ^{2}	Prop	27 February 1997 (aged 26)	2	(Fiji) Fijian Drua
Eroni Mawi	Prop	2 June 1996 (aged 27)	25	(England) Saracens
Peni Ravai	Prop	16 June 1990 (aged 33)	39	(Australia) Queensland Reds
Luke Tagi	Prop	23 June 1997 (aged 26)	9	(France) Bayonne
Samu Tawake	Prop	11 September 1996 (aged 26)	2	(Fiji) Fijian Drua
Emosi Tuqiri ^{2}	Prop	28 December 2000 (aged 22)	0	(Fiji) Fijian Drua
Te Ahiwaru Cirikidaveta	Lock	12 April 1998 (aged 25)	5	(Fiji) Fijian Drua
Temo Mayanavanua ^{3}	Lock	9 November 1997 (aged 25)	11	(England) Northampton Saints
Isoa Nasilasila	Lock	13 September 1999 (aged 23)	7	(Fiji) Fijian Drua
Api Ratuniyarawa ^{3}	Lock	11 July 1986 (aged 37)	41	(France) Bayonne
Lekima Tagitagivalu	Lock	4 December 1995 (aged 27)	3	(France) Pau
Levani Botia	Back row	14 March 1989 (aged 34)	24	(France) La Rochelle
Meli Derenalagi	Back row	26 November 1998 (aged 24)	3	(Fiji) Fijian Drua
Viliame Mata	Back row	22 October 1991 (aged 31)	26	(Scotland) Edinburgh
Vilive Miramira	Back row	21 March 1999 (aged 24)	1	(Fiji) Fijian Drua
Albert Tuisue	Back row	6 June 1993 (aged 30)	19	(England) Gloucester
Simione Kuruvoli	Scrum-half	2 January 1999 (aged 24)	7	(Fiji) Fijian Drua
Frank Lomani	Scrum-half	18 April 1996 (aged 27)	26	(Fiji) Fijian Drua
Ratu Peni Matawalu	Scrum-half	8 July 1997 (aged 26)	5	(Fiji) Fijian Drua
Caleb Muntz ^{1}	Fly-half	30 October 1999 (aged 23)	4	(Fiji) Fijian Drua
Teti Tela	Fly-half	7 March 1991 (aged 32)	6	(Fiji) Fijian Drua
Vilimoni Botitu ^{1}	Centre	15 June 1998 (aged 25)	8	(France) Castres
Sireli Maqala	Centre	21 March 2000 (aged 23)	4	(France) Bayonne
Iosefo Masi	Centre	9 May 1998 (aged 25)	2	(Fiji) Fijian Drua
Waisea Nayacalevu (c)	Centre	26 June 1990 (aged 33)	39	(France) Toulon
Semi Radradra	Centre	13 June 1992 (aged 31)	15	(France) Lyon
Josua Tuisova	Centre	4 February 1994 (aged 29)	19	(France) Racing 92
Vinaya Habosi	Wing	30 January 2000 (aged 23)	6	(France) Racing 92
Kalaveti Ravouvou	Wing	6 June 1998 (aged 25)	6	(England) Bristol Bears
Selestino Ravutaumada	Wing	17 January 2000 (aged 23)	4	(Fiji) Fijian Drua
Jiuta Wainiqolo	Wing	10 March 1999 (aged 24)	4	(France) Toulon
Ilaisa Droasese	Fullback	13 September 1999 (aged 23)	4	(Fiji) Fijian Drua

=== Georgia ===
Georgia announced their final squad on 28 August 2023.

^{1} On 27 September 2023, Beka Gorgadze was ruled out of the World Cup, after sustaining an ankle injury. He was replaced in the Georgia squad by Otar Giorgadze. Later that day, Luka Japaridze left the Georgia squad, after sustaining a back injury. He was replaced by Irakli Aptsiauri.

^{2} On 2 October 2023, Tengiz Zamtaradze, Mirian Modebadze and Lasha Jaiani were ruled out of the World Cup, after sustaining various injuries. They were replaced in the Georgia squad by Vano Karkadze, Otar Lashkhi and Mikheil Babunashvili.

Head Coach: (Georgia (country)) Levan Maisashvili

Player	Position	Date of birth (age)	Caps	Club/province
Shalva Mamukashvili	Hooker	2 October 1990 (aged 32)	100	(Georgia (country)) Black Lion
Luka Nioradze	Hooker	6 April 1999 (aged 24)	1	(France) Aurillac
Tengiz Zamtaradze ^{2}	Hooker	2 January 1998 (aged 25)	4	(Georgia (country)) Black Lion
Vano Karkadze ^{2}	Hooker	25 June 2000 (aged 23)	7	(France) Montpellier
Nika Abuladze	Prop	20 August 1995 (aged 28)	12	(England) Exeter Chiefs
Irakli Aptsiauri ^{1}	Prop	23 February 2003 (aged 20)	0	(France) Grenoble
Beka Gigashvili	Prop	17 February 1992 (aged 31)	36	(France) Toulon
Guram Gogichashvili	Prop	4 September 1998 (aged 25)	39	(France) Racing 92
Luka Japaridze ^{1}	Prop	6 September 1998 (aged 25)	8	(France) Montpellier
Mikheil Nariashvili	Prop	25 May 1990 (aged 33)	73	(Georgia (country)) Black Lion
Guram Papidze	Prop	16 June 1997 (aged 26)	12	(France) Pau
Lado Chachanidze	Lock	14 May 2000 (aged 23)	13	(France) Nevers
Nodar Tcheishvili	Lock	13 November 1990 (aged 32)	48	(Georgia (country)) Black Lion
Mikheil Babunashvili ^{2}	Lock	31 May 1996 (aged 27)	2	(Georgia (country)) Black Lion
Lasha Jaiani ^{2}	Lock	21 April 1998 (aged 25)	19	(France) Nevers
Konstantin Mikautadze	Lock	1 July 1991 (aged 32)	84	(France) Bayonne
Mikheil Gachechiladze	Back row	24 December 1990 (aged 32)	21	(Georgia (country)) Black Lion
Otar Giorgadze ^{1}	Back row	2 March 1996 (aged 27)	35	(France) Montauban
Beka Gorgadze ^{1}	Back row	8 February 1996 (aged 27)	40	(France) Pau
Luka Ivanishvili	Back row	25 November 2001 (aged 21)	7	(Georgia (country)) Black Lion
Tornike Jalagonia	Back row	12 December 1998 (aged 24)	24	(France) Biarritz
Beka Saghinadze	Back row	29 October 1998 (aged 24)	36	(France) Lyon
Giorgi Tsutskiridze	Back row	26 November 1996 (aged 26)	31	(France) Stade Français
Gela Aprasidze	Scrum-half	14 January 1998 (aged 25)	48	(France) Bayonne
Vasil Lobzhanidze	Scrum-half	14 October 1996 (aged 26)	78	(France) Brive
Tengiz Peranidze	Scrum-half	6 April 1998 (aged 25)	1	(Georgia (country)) Black Lion
Tedo Abzhandadze	Fly-half	13 June 1999 (aged 24)	43	(France) Montauban
Luka Matkava	Fly-half	5 October 2001 (aged 21)	10	(Georgia (country)) Black Lion
Tornike Kakhoidze	Centre	16 August 2003 (aged 20)	3	(Georgia (country)) Black Lion
Giorgi Kveseladze	Centre	11 November 1997 (aged 25)	48	(Georgia (country)) Black Lion
Merab Sharikadze (c)	Centre	17 May 1993 (aged 30)	96	(Georgia (country)) Black Lion
Demur Tapladze	Centre	18 March 2000 (aged 23)	28	(Georgia (country)) Black Lion
Mirian Modebadze ^{2}	Wing	27 October 1997 (aged 25)	25	(Georgia (country)) Black Lion
Otar Lashkhi ^{2}	Wing	27 April 2000 (aged 23)	2	(Georgia (country)) Black Lion
Aka Tabutsadze	Wing	19 August 1997 (aged 26)	31	(Georgia (country)) Black Lion
Alexander Todua	Wing	2 November 1987 (aged 35)	108	(Georgia (country)) Black Lion
Lasha Khmaladze	Fullback	20 January 1988 (aged 35)	96	(Georgia (country)) RC Batumi
Davit Niniashvili	Fullback	14 July 2002 (aged 21)	23	(France) Lyon

=== Portugal ===
Portugal announced their final squad on 28 August 2023.

Head coach: (France) Patrice Lagisquet

Player	Position	Date of birth (age)	Caps	Club/province
Lionel Campergue	Hooker	24 November 1987 (aged 35)	21	(France) Bassin d'Arcachon
Duarte Diniz	Hooker	8 November 1995 (aged 27)	35	(Portugal) Direito
Mike Tadjer	Hooker	10 March 1989 (aged 34)	32	(France) Perpignan
Anthony Alves	Prop	23 June 1989 (aged 34)	31	(France) Mont-de-Marsan
Francisco Bruno	Prop	28 May 1995 (aged 28)	24	(Portugal) Direito
David Costa	Prop	5 July 1999 (aged 24)	25	(Portugal) Direito
Francisco Fernandes	Prop	6 September 1985 (aged 38)	44	(France) Béziers
Diogo Hasse Ferreira	Prop	17 October 1996 (aged 26)	37	(France) Dax
António Machado Santos	Prop	9 June 1998 (aged 25)	2	(Portugal) Belenenses
Martim Bello	Lock	27 September 2000 (aged 22)	6	(Portugal) Cascais
Steevy Cerqueira	Lock	9 August 1993 (aged 30)	12	(France) Chambéry
José Madeira	Lock	19 March 2001 (aged 22)	32	(France) Grenoble
Duarte Torgal	Lock	23 December 1997 (aged 25)	19	(Portugal) Direito
Thibault de Freitas	Back row	8 January 1992 (aged 31)	31	(France) Floirac
João Granate	Back row	21 February 1997 (aged 26)	31	(Portugal) Direito
Nicolas Martins	Back row	18 January 1999 (aged 24)	8	(France) Soyaux Angoulême
Manuel Picão	Back row	10 April 1997 (aged 26)	21	(Portugal) Direito
Rafael Simões	Back row	20 June 1991 (aged 32)	27	(Portugal) CDUL
David Wallis	Back row	17 April 1997 (aged 26)	20	(Portugal) Belenenses
João Bello	Scrum-half	2 August 1995 (aged 28)	25	(Portugal) CDUP
Pedro Lucas	Scrum-half	16 October 2000 (aged 22)	17	(Portugal) Técnico
Samuel Marques	Scrum-half	8 December 1988 (aged 34)	22	(France) Béziers
Joris Moura	Fly-half	7 May 2000 (aged 23)	1	(France) Valence Romans
Jerónimo Portela	Fly-half	2 November 2000 (aged 22)	25	(Portugal) Direito
Tomás Appleton (c)	Centre	29 July 1993 (aged 30)	62	(Portugal) CDUL
Pedro Bettencourt	Centre	18 November 1994 (aged 28)	30	(France) Oyonnax
José Lima	Centre	24 April 1992 (aged 31)	55	(France) Narbonne
Rodrigo Marta	Wing	18 November 1999 (aged 23)	31	(France) Colomiers
Vincent Pinto	Wing	10 April 1999 (aged 24)	14	(France) Colomiers
Manuel Cardoso Pinto	Wing	7 April 1998 (aged 25)	30	(Portugal) Agronomia
Raffaele Storti	Wing	19 December 2000 (aged 22)	21	(France) Béziers
Simão Bento	Fullback	21 June 2001 (aged 22)	11	(France) Mont-de-Marsan
Nuno Sousa Guedes	Fullback	21 November 1994 (aged 28)	38	(Portugal) CDUP

== Pool D ==
=== England ===
England announced their initial squad on 7 August 2023.

^{1} On 14 August 2023, Jack van Poortvliet was ruled out of the World Cup, after sustaining an ankle injury. He was replaced in the England squad by Alex Mitchell.

^{2} On 27 August 2023, Anthony Watson was ruled out of the World Cup, after sustaining a calf injury. He was replaced in the England squad by Jonny May.

^{3} On 5 October 2023, Jack Willis was ruled out of the World Cup, after sustaining a neck injury. He was replaced in the England squad by Sam Underhill.

Head coach: (England) Steve Borthwick

Player	Position	Date of birth (age)	Caps	Club/province
Theo Dan	Hooker	26 December 2000 (aged 22)	3	(England) Saracens
Jamie George	Hooker	20 October 1990 (aged 32)	79	(England) Saracens
Jack Walker	Hooker	6 May 1996 (aged 27)	4	(England) Harlequins
Dan Cole	Prop	9 May 1987 (aged 36)	102	(England) Leicester Tigers
Ellis Genge (vc)	Prop	16 February 1995 (aged 28)	52	(England) Bristol Bears
Joe Marler	Prop	7 July 1990 (aged 33)	82	(England) Harlequins
Bevan Rodd	Prop	26 August 2000 (aged 23)	3	(England) Sale Sharks
Kyle Sinckler	Prop	30 March 1993 (aged 30)	63	(England) Bristol Bears
Will Stuart	Prop	12 July 1996 (aged 27)	29	(England) Bath
Ollie Chessum	Lock	6 September 2000 (aged 23)	11	(England) Leicester Tigers
Maro Itoje	Lock	28 October 1994 (aged 28)	70	(England) Saracens
Courtney Lawes (vc)	Lock	23 February 1989 (aged 34)	100	(England) Northampton Saints
George Martin	Lock	18 June 2001 (aged 22)	3	(England) Leicester Tigers
David Ribbans	Lock	29 August 1995 (aged 28)	8	(France) Toulon
Tom Curry	Back row	15 June 1998 (aged 25)	45	(England) Sale Sharks
Ben Earl	Back row	7 January 1998 (aged 25)	18	(England) Saracens
Lewis Ludlam	Back row	8 December 1995 (aged 27)	21	(England) Northampton Saints
Sam Underhill ^{3}	Back row	22 July 1996 (aged 27)	29	(England) Bath
Jack Willis ^{3}	Back row	24 December 1996 (aged 26)	13	(France) Toulouse
Billy Vunipola	Back row	3 November 1992 (aged 30)	70	(England) Saracens
Danny Care	Scrum-half	2 January 1987 (aged 36)	90	(England) Harlequins
Alex Mitchell ^{1}	Scrum-half	25 May 1997 (aged 26)	6	(England) Northampton Saints
Jack van Poortvliet ^{1}	Scrum-half	15 May 2001 (aged 22)	14	(England) Leicester Tigers
Ben Youngs	Scrum-half	5 September 1989 (aged 34)	124	(England) Leicester Tigers
Owen Farrell (c)	Fly-half	24 September 1991 (aged 31)	107	(England) Saracens
George Ford	Fly-half	16 March 1993 (aged 30)	85	(England) Sale Sharks
Marcus Smith	Fly-half	14 February 1999 (aged 24)	24	(England) Harlequins
Elliot Daly	Centre	8 October 1992 (aged 30)	59	(England) Saracens
Ollie Lawrence	Centre	18 September 1999 (aged 23)	14	(England) Bath
Joe Marchant	Centre	16 July 1996 (aged 27)	19	(France) Stade Français
Manu Tuilagi	Centre	18 May 1991 (aged 32)	53	(England) Sale Sharks
Max Malins	Wing	7 January 1997 (aged 26)	21	(England) Bristol Bears
Jonny May ^{2}	Wing	1 April 1990 (aged 33)	72	(England) Gloucester
Anthony Watson ^{2}	Wing	26 February 1994 (aged 29)	56	Unattached
Henry Arundell	Fullback	8 November 2002 (aged 20)	8	(France) Racing 92
Freddie Steward	Fullback	5 December 2000 (aged 22)	26	(England) Leicester Tigers

=== Japan ===
On 15 August 2023, Japan named an initial 30-player squad for the World Cup, with three players remaining to be added. On 18 August 2023, Warner Dearns, Amanaki Saumaki and Lappies Labuschagné were added to complete the 33-player squad.

^{1} On 18 August 2023, James Moore was replaced by Uwe Helu.

^{2} On 29 August 2023, Uwe Helu and Shōgo Nakano were withdrawn due to performance issues and replaced by Amato Fakatava and Kanji Shimokawa.

^{3} On 19 September 2023, Semisi Masirewa was replaced, after a leg injury, by Ryohei Yamanaka.

Head Coach: (New Zealand) Jamie Joseph

Player	Position	Date of birth (age)	Caps	Club/province
Shota Horie	Hooker	21 January 1986 (aged 37)	72	(Japan) Saitama Wild Knights
Kosuke Horikoshi	Hooker	2 June 1995 (aged 28)	7	(Japan) Tokyo Sungoliath
Atsushi Sakate	Hooker	21 June 1993 (aged 30)	37	(Japan) Saitama Wild Knights
Asaeli Ai Valu	Prop	7 May 1989 (aged 34)	26	(Japan) Saitama Wild Knights
Sione Halasili	Prop	15 October 1999 (aged 23)	0	(Japan) Yokohama Canon Eagles
Keita Inagaki	Prop	2 June 1990 (aged 33)	49	(Japan) Saitama Wild Knights
Koo Ji-won	Prop	20 July 1994 (aged 29)	25	(Japan) Kobelco Kobe Steelers
Shinnosuke Kakinaga	Prop	19 December 1991 (aged 31)	12	(Japan) Tokyo Sungoliath
Craig Millar	Prop	29 October 1990 (aged 32)	13	(Japan) Saitama Wild Knights
Jack Cornelsen	Lock	13 October 1994 (aged 28)	16	(Japan) Saitama Wild Knights
Warner Dearns	Lock	11 April 2002 (aged 21)	7	(Japan) Toshiba Brave Lupus Tokyo
Amato Fakatava ^{2}	Lock	7 December 1994 (aged 28)	3	(Japan) Black Rams Tokyo
Uwe Helu ^{1,} ^{2}	Lock	12 July 1990 (aged 33)	19	(Japan) Kubota Spears
James Moore ^{1}	Lock	6 November 1993 (aged 29)	16	(Japan) Urayasu D-Rocks
Amanaki Saumaki	Lock	8 March 1997 (aged 26)	1	(Japan) Kobelco Kobe Steelers
Shota Fukui	Back row	28 September 1999 (aged 23)	2	(Japan) Saitama Wild Knights
Ben Gunter	Back row	24 October 1997 (aged 25)	8	(Japan) Saitama Wild Knights
Kazuki Himeno (c)	Back row	27 July 1994 (aged 29)	29	(Japan) Toyota Verblitz
Lappies Labuschagné	Back row	11 January 1989 (aged 34)	16	(Japan) Kubota Spears
Michael Leitch	Back row	7 October 1988 (aged 34)	80	(Japan) Toshiba Brave Lupus Tokyo
Kanji Shimokawa ^{2}	Back row	17 January 1999 (aged 24)	2	(Japan) Tokyo Sungoliath
Kenta Fukuda	Scrum-half	19 December 1996 (aged 26)	0	(Japan) Toyota Verblitz
Yutaka Nagare	Scrum-half	4 September 1992 (aged 31)	34	(Japan) Tokyo Sungoliath
Naoto Saito	Scrum-half	26 August 1997 (aged 26)	15	(Japan) Tokyo Sungoliath
Jumpei Ogura	Fly-half	11 July 1992 (aged 31)	4	(Japan) Yokohama Canon Eagles
Rikiya Matsuda	Fly-half	3 May 1994 (aged 29)	33	(Japan) Saitama Wild Knights
Lee Seung-sin	Fly-half	13 January 2001 (aged 22)	10	(Japan) Kobelco Kobe Steelers
Ryoto Nakamura	Centre	3 June 1991 (aged 32)	35	(Japan) Tokyo Sungoliath
Shōgo Nakano ^{2}	Centre	11 June 1997 (aged 26)	7	(Japan) Tokyo Sungoliath
Dylan Riley	Centre	2 May 1997 (aged 26)	14	(Japan) Saitama Wild Knights
Tomoki Osada	Centre	25 November 1999 (aged 23)	4	(Japan) Saitama Wild Knights
Ryohei Yamanaka ^{3}	Centre	22 June 1988 (aged 35)	18	(Japan) Kobelco Kobe Steelers
Siosaia Fifita	Wing	20 December 1998 (aged 24)	12	(Japan) Toyota Verblitz
Lomano Lemeki	Wing	20 January 1989 (aged 34)	16	(Japan) Green Rockets Tokatsu
Semisi Masirewa ^{3}	Wing	9 June 1992 (aged 31)	5	(Japan) Hanazono Kintetsu Liners
Jone Naikabula	Wing	12 April 1994 (aged 29)	4	(Japan) Toshiba Brave Lupus Tokyo
Kotaro Matsushima	Fullback	26 February 1993 (aged 30)	51	(Japan) Tokyo Sungoliath

=== Argentina ===
Argentina announced their final squad on 7 August 2023.

^{1} On 22 August 2023, Nahuel Tetaz Chaparro was ruled out of the World Cup, after sustaining an injury. He was replaced in the Argentina squad by Mayco Vivas.

^{2} On 27 August 2023, Santiago Grondona was ruled out of the World Cup, after sustaining an injury. He was replaced in the Argentina squad by Joaquín Oviedo.

^{3} On 9 October 2023, Pablo Matera was ruled out of the World Cup, after sustaining a hamstring injury. He was replaced in the Argentina squad by Lucas Paulos.

Head coach: (Australia) Michael Cheika

Player	Position	Date of birth (age)	Caps	Club/province
Agustín Creevy	Hooker	15 March 1985 (aged 38)	101	(England) Sale Sharks
Julián Montoya (c)	Hooker	29 October 1993 (aged 29)	89	(England) Leicester Tigers
Ignacio Ruiz	Hooker	3 January 2001 (aged 22)	6	(France) Perpignan
Eduardo Bello	Prop	27 November 1995 (aged 27)	14	(England) Newcastle Falcons
Thomas Gallo	Prop	30 April 1999 (aged 24)	17	(Italy) Benetton
Francisco Gómez Kodela	Prop	7 July 1985 (aged 38)	31	(France) Lyon
Joel Sclavi	Prop	25 June 1994 (aged 29)	12	(France) La Rochelle
Nahuel Tetaz Chaparro ^{1}	Prop	11 March 1989 (aged 34)	78	(Italy) Benetton
Mayco Vivas ^{1}	Prop	2 June 1998 (aged 25)	19	(England) Gloucester
Matías Alemanno	Lock	5 December 1991 (aged 31)	87	(England) Gloucester
Tomás Lavanini	Lock	22 January 1993 (aged 30)	82	(France) Clermont
Lucas Paulos ^{3}	Lock	9 January 1998 (aged 25)	12	(France) Brive
Guido Petti	Lock	17 September 1994 (aged 28)	75	(France) Bordeaux Bègles
Pedro Rubiolo	Lock	12 December 2002 (aged 20)	5	(England) Newcastle Falcons
Rodrigo Bruni	Back row	3 September 1993 (aged 30)	21	(France) Bayonne
Juan Martín González	Back row	14 November 2000 (aged 22)	24	(England) Saracens
Santiago Grondona ^{2}	Back row	25 July 1998 (aged 25)	15	(England) Bristol Bears
Facundo Isa	Back row	21 September 1993 (aged 29)	47	(France) Toulon
Marcos Kremer	Back row	30 July 1997 (aged 26)	57	(France) Clermont
Pablo Matera ^{3}	Back row	18 July 1993 (aged 30)	95	(Japan) Mie Honda Heat
Joaquín Oviedo ^{2}	Back row	25 July 1998 (aged 25)	1	(France) Perpignan
Lautaro Bazán	Scrum-half	24 February 1996 (aged 27)	7	(Italy) Rovigo Delta
Gonzalo Bertranou	Scrum-half	31 December 1993 (aged 29)	53	(Wales) Dragons
Tomás Cubelli	Scrum-half	12 June 1989 (aged 34)	89	(United States) Miami Sharks
Santiago Carreras	Fly-half	30 March 1998 (aged 25)	35	(England) Gloucester
Nicolás Sánchez	Fly-half	26 August 1988 (aged 35)	98	Unattached
Santiago Chocobares	Centre	31 March 1999 (aged 24)	14	(France) Toulouse
Lucio Cinti	Centre	23 February 2000 (aged 23)	16	(England) Saracens
Jerónimo de la Fuente	Centre	24 February 1991 (aged 32)	76	(France) Perpignan
Matías Moroni	Centre	29 March 1991 (aged 32)	74	(England) Newcastle Falcons
Emiliano Boffelli	Wing	16 January 1995 (aged 28)	53	(Scotland) Edinburgh
Mateo Carreras	Wing	17 December 1999 (aged 23)	11	(England) Newcastle Falcons
Juan Imhoff	Wing	11 May 1988 (aged 35)	42	(France) Racing 92
Rodrigo Isgró	Wing	24 March 1999 (aged 24)	2	Argentina Sevens
Martín Bogado	Fullback	29 April 1998 (aged 25)	2	(New Zealand) Highlanders
Juan Cruz Mallía	Fullback	11 September 1996 (aged 26)	26	(France) Toulouse

=== Samoa ===
Samoa announced their final squad on 28 August 2023.

^{1} On 18 September 2023, Luteru Tolai was ruled out of the World Cup, after sustaining a knee injury. He was replaced in the Samoa squad by Ray Niuia.

Head coach: (Samoa) Seilala Mapusua

Player	Position	Date of birth (age)	Caps	Club/province
Seilala Lam	Hooker	18 February 1989 (aged 34)	23	(France) Perpignan
Sama Malolo	Hooker	19 February 1998 (aged 25)	3	(United States) San Diego Legion
Ray Niuia ^{1}	Hooker	19 June 1991 (aged 32)	14	(New Zealand) Moana Pasifika
Luteru Tolai ^{1}	Hooker	1 June 1998 (aged 25)	3	(New Zealand) Moana Pasifika
Michael Alaalatoa (c)	Prop	28 August 1991 (aged 32)	13	(Ireland) Leinster
Paul Alo-Emile	Prop	22 December 1991 (aged 31)	21	(France) Stade Français
Charlie Faumuina	Prop	24 December 1986 (aged 36)	3	(France) Toulouse
James Lay	Prop	16 December 1993 (aged 29)	12	(New Zealand) Blues
Jordan Lay	Prop	5 November 1992 (aged 30)	26	(New Zealand) Blues
Brian Alainu'uese	Lock	19 March 1994 (aged 29)	5	(France) Toulon
Theo McFarland	Lock	16 October 1995 (aged 27)	7	(England) Saracens
Sam Slade	Lock	28 August 1997 (aged 26)	4	(New Zealand) Moana Pasifika
Chris Vui (c)	Lock	11 February 1993 (aged 30)	25	(England) Bristol Bears
So'otala Fa'aso'o	Back row	2 October 1994 (aged 28)	1	(France) Perpignan
Miracle Faiʻilagi	Back row	31 August 1999 (aged 24)	3	(New Zealand) Moana Pasifika
Fritz Lee	Back row	29 August 1988 (aged 35)	7	(France) Clermont
Steve Luatua	Back row	29 April 1991 (aged 32)	3	(England) Bristol Bears
Alamanda Motuga	Back row	11 September 1995 (aged 27)	5	(New Zealand) Moana Pasifika
Taleni Seu	Back row	26 December 1993 (aged 29)	6	(Japan) Toyota Shuttles
Jordan Taufua	Back row	29 January 1992 (aged 31)	6	(France) Lyon
Ere Enari	Scrum-half	30 May 1997 (aged 26)	7	(New Zealand) Moana Pasifika
Melani Matavao	Scrum-half	19 November 1995 (aged 27)	13	Samoa Sevens
Jonathan Taumateine	Scrum-half	28 September 1996 (aged 26)	11	(New Zealand) Moana Pasifika
Christian Leali'ifano	Fly-half	24 September 1987 (aged 35)	3	(New Zealand) Moana Pasifika
Lima Sopoaga	Fly-half	3 February 1991 (aged 32)	1	(Japan) Shimizu Blue Sharks
D'Angelo Leuila	Centre	18 January 1997 (aged 26)	18	(New Zealand) Moana Pasifika
Tumua Manu	Centre	18 April 1993 (aged 30)	7	(France) Pau
Duncan Paia'aua	Centre	20 January 1995 (aged 28)	6	(France) Toulon
UJ Seuteni	Centre	9 December 1993 (aged 29)	12	(France) La Rochelle
Nigel Ah Wong	Wing	30 May 1990 (aged 33)	8	Unattached
Ed Fidow	Wing	11 September 1993 (aged 29)	19	(United States) New York
Neria Fomai	Wing	3 February 1992 (aged 31)	8	(New Zealand) Moana Pasifika
Ben Lam	Wing	9 June 1991 (aged 32)	0	(France) Montpellier
Danny Toala	Fullback	26 March 1999 (aged 24)	8	(New Zealand) Moana Pasifika

=== Chile ===
Chile announced their final squad on 27 August 2023.

^{1} On 8 September 2023, Nicolás Garafulic was ruled out of the World Cup, after sustaining an injury. He was replaced in the Chile squad by Cristóbal Game Jiménez.

Head coach: (Uruguay) Pablo Lemoine

Player	Position	Date of birth (age)	Caps	Franchise/province
Augusto Böhme	Hooker	11 June 1997 (aged 26)	22	(Chile) Selknam
Tomás Dussaillant	Hooker	6 October 1990 (aged 32)	37	(Chile) Selknam
Diego Escobar	Hooker	17 April 2000 (aged 23)	5	(Chile) Selknam
Javier Carrasco	Prop	24 August 1997 (aged 26)	19	(Chile) Selknam
Matías Dittus	Prop	16 July 1993 (aged 30)	21	(France) Périgueux
Iñaki Gurruchaga	Prop	13 October 1995 (aged 27)	11	(Chile) Selknam
Esteban Inostroza	Prop	1 January 1994 (aged 29)	1	(Chile) Selknam
Vittorio Lastra	Prop	26 March 1996 (aged 27)	22	(Chile) Selknam
Salvador Lues	Prop	6 November 1999 (aged 23)	11	(Chile) Selknam
Javier Eissmann	Lock	21 March 1997 (aged 26)	21	(Chile) Selknam
Pablo Huete	Lock	11 January 1989 (aged 34)	30	(Chile) Selknam
Santiago Pedrero	Lock	30 November 2000 (aged 22)	6	(Chile) Selknam
Augusto Sarmiento	Lock	30 April 1993 (aged 30)	15	(Chile) PWCC
Alfonso Escobar	Back row	17 August 1997 (aged 26)	18	(Chile) Selknam
Raimundo Martínez	Back row	25 November 1999 (aged 23)	10	(Chile) Selknam
Thomas Orchard	Back row	12 January 1997 (aged 26)	12	(Chile) Selknam
Clemente Saavedra	Back row	15 December 1997 (aged 25)	20	(Chile) Selknam
Martín Sigren (c)	Back row	14 May 1996 (aged 27)	27	(England) Doncaster Knights
Ignacio Silva	Back row	16 February 1989 (aged 34)	38	(Chile) Selknam
Lukas Carvallo	Scrum-half	6 July 2001 (aged 22)	6	(Chile) Selknam
Nicolás Herreros	Scrum-half	23 January 1990 (aged 33)	5	(Chile) Selknam
Marcelo Torrealba	Scrum-half	6 May 1996 (aged 27)	12	(Chile) Selknam
Benjamín Videla	Scrum-half	24 April 2001 (aged 22)	0	(Chile) Selknam
Rodrigo Fernández	Fly-half	8 February 1996 (aged 27)	23	(Chile) Selknam
Santiago Videla	Fly-half	16 January 1998 (aged 25)	25	(Chile) Selknam
Pablo Casas	Centre	4 March 1992 (aged 31)	15	(Chile) Selknam
Matías Garafulic	Centre	1 September 2000 (aged 23)	12	(Chile) Selknam
José Ignacio Larenas	Centre	14 September 1989 (aged 33)	47	(Chile) Selknam
Domingo Saavedra	Centre	15 December 1997 (aged 25)	24	(Chile) Selknam
Cristóbal Game Jiménez ^{1}	Wing	9 July 2002 (aged 21)	1	(Chile) Old John's
Nicolás Garafulic ^{1}	Wing	11 September 1998 (aged 24)	19	(Chile) Selknam
Franco Velarde	Wing	4 November 1994 (aged 28)	16	(Chile) VOBGS
Iñaki Ayarza	Fullback	7 September 1999 (aged 24)	14	(France) Soyaux Angoulême
Francisco Urroz	Fullback	7 September 1993 (aged 30)	11	(Chile) Selknam

== Statistics ==
All statistics relate to the initial 33-man squads named before the start of the tournament on 8 September 2023, and do not include players who joined a squad during the tournament.

- Four squads have all of their players attached to clubs based within their home country: France, Ireland, Japan and New Zealand.
- One squad has none of their players attached to clubs based within their home country: Tonga.

=== Player representation by club ===
A total of 142 different clubs are represented across the 660 players named for the World Cup.

The club sides with the most players represented across the 20 squads are as follows:

Players	Clubs
28	(Chile) Selknam
21	(Uruguay) Peñarol
20	(Italy) Benetton
19	(New Zealand) Moana Pasifika
18	(Ireland) Leinster
17	(Fiji) Fijian Drua / (France) Toulouse
16	(Scotland) Edinburgh
15	(Georgia (country)) Black Lion / (Scotland) Glasgow Warriors
13	(England) Saracens / (Japan) Saitama Wild Knights
11	(France) La Rochelle / (France) Toulon

=== Player representation by league ===
League	Players	Percent
Total	660	—
United Rugby Championship ( (Ireland) / (Italy) / (South Africa) / (Scotland) / (Wales) )	132	20.0%
Top 14 ( (France) )	106	16.0%
Super Rugby ( (Australia) / (Fiji) / (New Zealand) )	106	16.0%
Premiership Rugby ( (England) )	64	9.6%
Japan Rugby League One	50	7.6%
Super Rugby Americas ( (Chile) / (Uruguay) )	49	7.4%
Pro D2 ( (France) )	32	4.8%
Liga Națională de Rugby ( (Romania) )	24	3.6%
European Professional Club Rugby ( (Georgia (country)) / (Israel) )	17	2.6%
Campeonato Português de Rugby ( (Portugal) )	16	2.4%
Championnat Fédéral Nationale / Fédérale 1, 2, 3 ( (France) )	14	2.1%
Major League Rugby ( (United States) )	10	1.5%
Other ( (Argentina) / (Chile) / (England) / (Italy) / (Namibia) / (New Zealand) / (Russia) / (Samoa) / (South Africa) / (Spain) / (Uruguay) )	31	4.7%
Unattached	9	1.4%

=== Player representation by nation ===
Union	Players	Percent	Other national squad
Total	660	—	—
Argentina	1	0.2%	0
Australia	32	4.9	3
Chile	30	4.6%	—
England	64	9.7%	36
Fiji	17	2.6%	—
France	155	23.5%	122
(Georgia (country)) Georgia	16	2.4%	—
Ireland	37	5.6%	5
Italy	28	4.2%	6
Japan	50	7.6%	17
Namibia	9	1.4%	—
New Zealand	57	8.6%	24
Portugal	16	2.4%	—
Romania	24	3.6%	1
Samoa	2	0.3%	—
Scotland	31	4.7%	3
South Africa	24	3.6%	7
Uruguay	25	3.8%	—
Wales	23	3.5%	3
Other	0	0.0%	13
Unattached	7	1.1%	—

=== Average age of squads ===
The age for each player listed below is their age on 8 September 2023, the day that the World Cup begins.

- The oldest player at the tournament is P. J. van Lill (Namibia), at the age of 39.
- The youngest player at the tournament is Max Jorgensen (Australia), at the age of 19.
- The age gap between the oldest and youngest players is 20 years and 272 days.

Nation	Avg. Age	Oldest player	Youngest player
Argentina	28	Agustín Creevy (38 years, 177 days)	Pedro Rubiolo (20 years, 270 days)
Australia	25	James Slipper (34 years, 94 days)	Max Jorgensen (19 years, 6 days)
Chile	27	Pablo Huete (34 years, 240 days)	Lukas Carvallo (22 years, 64 days)
England	28	Danny Care (36 years, 249 days)	Henry Arundell (20 years, 304 days)
Fiji	27	Levani Botia (34 years, 178 days)	Sireli Maqala (23 years, 171 days)
France	27	Uini Atonio (33 years, 166 days)	Louis Bielle-Biarrey (20 years, 84 days)
(Georgia (country)) Georgia	27	Alexander Todua (35 years, 310 days)	Tornike Kakhoidze (20 years, 23 days)
Ireland	29	Johnny Sexton (38 years, 59 days)	Joe McCarthy (22 years, 166 days)
Italy	27	Federico Zani (34 years, 152 days)	Lorenzo Pani (21 years, 66 days)
Japan	29	Shōta Horie (37 years, 230 days)	Warner Dearns (21 years, 150 days)
Namibia	28	P. J. van Lill (39 years, 278 days)	Oela Blaauw (21 years, 326 days)
New Zealand	27	Dane Coles (36 years, 272 days)	Cam Roigard (22 years, 296 days)
Portugal	27	Francisco Fernandes (38 years, 2 days)	Simão Bento (22 years, 79 days)
Romania	27	Florin Surugiu (38 years, 272 days)	Mihai Mureșan (20 years, 341 days)
Samoa	29	Charlie Faumuina (36 years, 258 days)	Miracle Faiʻilagi (24 years, 8 days)
Scotland	28	WP Nel (37 years, 131 days)	Ollie Smith (23 years, 32 days)
South Africa	30	Duane Vermeulen (37 years, 67 days)	Canan Moodie (20 years, 307 days)
Tonga	29	Siegfried Fisiʻihoi (36 years, 92 days)	Kyren Taumoefolau (20 years, 123 days)
Uruguay	26	Matías Benítez (35 years, 115 days)	Santiago Álvarez (21 years, 258 days)
Wales	28	Dan Lydiate (34 years, 264 days)	Dafydd Jenkins (20 years, 277 days)

=== Squad caps ===
Nation	Caps	Most capped player	Least capped player
New Zealand	1524	Sam Whitelock (146)	Emoni Narawa (1)
England	1476	Ben Youngs (124)	Theo Dan (3)
Argentina	1454	Agustín Creevy (101)	Rodrigo Isgro (2)
South Africa	1369	Eben Etzebeth (113)	Jean Kleyn (3)
Ireland	1332	Johnny Sexton (113)	Jeremy Loughman (3)
Wales	1297	George North (114)	Corey Domachowski / Henry Thomas (2)
(Georgia (country)) Georgia	1246	Alexander Todua (108)	Luka Nioradze (1)
Scotland	1037	Richie Gray (75)	Ben Healy (3)
Uruguay	1019	Gastón Mieres (82)	Ignacio Facciolo (1)
Portugal	840	Tomás Appleton (62)	Joris Moura (1)
France	835	Gaël Fickou (81)	Paul Boudehent (3)
Italy	746	Tommaso Allan (75)	Giacomo Da Re / Martin Page-Relo (2)
Romania	681	Mihai Macovei (104)	Tevita Manumua (2)
Australia	668	James Slipper (131)	Max Jorgensen (0)
Japan	660	Michael Leitch (80)	Kenta Fukuda / Sione Halasili (0)
Chile	575	José Ignacio Larenas (47)	Benjamín Videla (0)
Namibia	563	P. J. van Lill (60)	Oela Blaauw (0)
Tonga	407	Sonatane Takulua (52)	Adam Coleman (0)
Fiji	374	Peni Ravai (39)	Vilive Miramira (1)
Samoa	297	Jordan Lay (26)	Ben Lam (0)

=== Previous World Cup experience ===
==== By matches ====
Player	RWC Matches
(New Zealand) Sam Whitelock	19
(Australia) James Slipper	18
(Wales) George North	16
(England) Dan Cole	15
(Argentina) Agustín Creevy	15
(Ireland) Keith Earls	14
(England) Ben Youngs	14
(South Africa) Damian de Allende	13
(South Africa) Eben Etzebeth	13
(Japan) Michael Leitch	13
(Ireland) Conor Murray	13
(South Africa) Handré Pollard	13

==== By tournaments ====
Player	World Cups
(England) Dan Cole	3
(Argentina) Agustín Creevy	3
(Ireland) Keith Earls	3
(Japan) Shota Horie	3
(Georgia (country)) Lasha Khmaladze	3
(England) Courtney Lawes	3
(Japan) Michael Leitch	3
(Ireland) Conor Murray	3
(Wales) George North	3
(Argentina) Nicolás Sánchez	3
(Ireland) Johnny Sexton	3
(Australia) James Slipper	3
(Georgia (country)) Alexander Todua	3
(Namibia) P. J. van Lill	3
(New Zealand) Sam Whitelock	3
(England) Ben Youngs	3

==== Nationality changes between World Cups ====
The following players selected for a 2023 Rugby World Cup squad represented a different nation at a previous World Cup:

Player	Nation at previous World Cup	Nation at current World Cup	Ref
Charlie Faumuina	New Zealand (2015)	Samoa (2023)	
Malakai Fekitoa	New Zealand (2015)	Tonga (2023)	
Adam Coleman	Australia (2019)	Tonga (2023)	
Jack Dempsey	Australia (2019)	Scotland (2023)	
Jean Kleyn	Ireland (2019)	South Africa (2023)	
Christian Leali'ifano	Australia (2019)	Samoa (2023)	
