= Windhoek High School =

Namibian secondary school

Coordinates: 22°34′06.75″S 17°05′20.75″E

- Windhoek; Namibia

Information
- Established: 5 February 1917; 108 years ago
- Head teacher: Mrs Dinnette de Beer
- Language: English (1917-present); Afrikaans (1932-1991); German (1935-1991)

Windhoek High School (WHS) is a secondary school in Windhoek, the capital of Namibia. Popularly known as ‘’The Blue School’’, it was founded on 5 February 1917, making it one of the oldest existing schools in the country. Currently, WHS is rated among the top 100 schools in Africa.

== Headteachers ==
The current headteacher of Windhoek High School is Heloise Steyn (Acting). The previous headmaster Dinette de Beer for 2 years and before her it was Willem Hendrik Engels (known as Hawie). Engels was born on 27 December 1962 in Gobabis. Together with his two younger sisters he was raised in Gobabis by his parents. During his school years at Wennie du Plessis, he was not only head boy, but also excelled on the sports field, especially in athletics and rugby.

== History ==
On 5 February 1917, Windhoek High School opened, and made history as South West Africa's first secondary school, with English as main medium of teaching. The first principal is Mr WJG Anderson with seven grade nine learners. In 1919 the school badge and motto was established. In 1921 the first four matrix learners wrote the National Examination. The school uniform first came into use in 1923, that year the school relocated from Robert Mugabe Street to its current location. In 1932 the school adopted Afrikaans and becomes a dual-medium school.

In 1935 WHS was the only tri-medium school in Southern Africa, offering classes in English, Afrikaans and German. In 1938. the school hall was completed. In 1952 the school anthem was used for the first time. In 1961, for the first time, more than 1100 learners were registered at WHS. In 1962 the main medium of instruction was Afrikaans. In 1974 the new school hall and laboratories were inaugurated. In 1991, Namibia gained independence with a reintroduction of English as medium of instruction in all classes.

== Traditions ==
- School badge and school motto (1919)
- School uniform (1921)
- School anthem (1952)
- House competition (1954): Kanniedood, Swarthaak and Wag-n-Bietjie.
- Rugby jersey of the first team (1960)
- Unique uniform of the Grade 11-12 learners (1965)
- Honorary code of new learners (1965)
- Senjol (1985)
- Annual year book (first 1920)
- Unique uniforms and customs of Student Council
- A tradition of academic results and competitive participation in sport and cultural activities.

== Facilities ==
WHS features a school hall for nearly 800 people, a computer centre, science laboratories, and a media centre. It also has a word-processing centre, a cafeteria and a big stadium called Vegkop, and an indoor heated swimming pool.

Windhoek High School also has three rugby fields, four tennis courts, a soccer field, two hockey fields, four netball courts, a 300 square meter gymnasium, a basketball and volleyball court. WHS is consistently successful in many kinds of sport.

=== Cricket ground ===
The school's cricket ground first hosted an international match when Namibia played Scotland in a Twenty20 match on 4 October 2011, with the teams playing one another the following day. Further Twenty20 matches were held at the ground in November 2011 when Namibia played Kenya in eight matches at the school. In the fifth Twenty20 between the sides, Namibia's Louis van der Westhuizen scored 145 runs from 54 balls, which is the fifth highest score ever made in a Twenty20 match.

== Notable alumni ==
- Henning van Aswegen rugby union player for Springboks
- Chris Badenhorst rugby union player for Springboks
- Jacques Burger (born 1985), rugby union player for Saracens
- Prince ǃGaoseb (born 1998), rugby union player for the Tel Aviv Heat
- Ryan De La Harpe (born 1982), rugby union player for Sale Sharks
- Max Katjijeko (born 1995), rugby union player for the Tel Aviv Heat
- Harold Pupkewitz (1915–2012), entrepreneur
- Louis van der Westhuizen (born 1995), rugby union player for the Cheetahs

== See also ==
- Education in Namibia
- List of schools in Namibia
