= Danny Hobbs-Awoyemi =

English rugby union player

- Born: Daniel Hobbs-Awoyemi; 7 March 1994 (age 32) Northampton, England
- Height: 1.82 m (6 ft 0 in)
- Weight: 119 kg (18 st 10 lb)

Rugby union career
- Position: Prop
- Current team: Tel Aviv Heat
Senior career
Years	Team	Apps	(Points)
2013–2015	Northampton Saints	4	(0)
2014–2016	→ Birmingham Moseley (loan)	14	(0)
2016–2020	London Irish	43	(15)
2018	→ London Scottish (loan)	1	(0)
2020–2023	Northampton Saints	10	(0)
2021–2022	→ Bedford Blues (loan)	8	(5)
2022	→ Ampthill (loan)	1	(0)
2023–	Tel Aviv Heat	8	(0)
- Correct as of 1 April 2024
International career
Years	Team	Apps	(Points)
2011–2012	England U18	8	(0)
2012–2014	England U20	20	(5)
- Correct as of 1 April 2024

Danny Hobbs-Awoyemi (born 7 March 1994) is an English rugby union player who competes for Tel Aviv Heat in the Rugby Europe Super Cup.

== Club career ==
A graduate of Northampton Saints academy, Hobbs-Awoyemi made his first-team debut against Newport Gwent Dragons in the Anglo-Welsh Cup during the 2013–14 season. He signed a professional deal to stay at Franklin's Gardens for the 2014–15 season. He was dual-registered with Championship side Birmingham Moseley from the 2015 season whilst enjoying playing time with the Saints in the Anglo-Welsh Cup.

On 31 March 2016, Hobbs-Awoyemi left Northampton to join London Irish for the 2016–17 season. He made his debut in the RFU Championship opening round winning 19–0 against Doncaster Knights. He signed a two-year contract extension to stay with London Irish until the end of the 2019–20 season.

On 26 June 2020, Hobbs-Awoyemi re-signed with hometown club Northampton Saints ahead of the 2020–21 season. He made ten appearances during his second spell with Northampton. In the summer of 2023 he left the club to join Tel Aviv Heat. In May 2024 it was announced that he had joined Daventry RFC for the upcoming season.

== International career ==
Hobbs-Awoyemi represented England under-18 and was a member of the England under-20 side that won the 2013 Six Nations Under 20s Championship. Later that year he came off the bench in the final of the 2013 IRB Junior World Championship as England defeated Wales to become junior world champions for the first time in their history.

In June 2014 Hobbs-Awoyemi scored a try in a victory against Ireland during the semi-final of the 2014 IRB Junior World Championship. He started in the final as England defeated South Africa at Eden Park to retain their title.

== Personal life ==
Married in 2022 to Georgina Hobbs Awoyemi, has two children Gigí Hobbs Awoyemi and Dace Hobbs Awoyemi.

== Honours ==
England U20

- World Rugby U20 Championship: 2013, 2014
- Six Nations Under 20s Championship: 2013
