= Wiehahn Herbst =

South African rugby union player

- Full name: Wiehahn Jovan Herbst
- Born: 5 July 1988 (age 38) Klerksdorp, South Africa
- Height: 1.80 m (5 ft 11 in)
- Weight: 117 kg (258 lb)
- School: Klerksdorp High School

Rugby union career
- Position: Prop
- Current team: Sharks (Currie Cup)
Senior career
Years	Team	Apps	(Points)
2009–2014	Sharks XV	28	(5)
2009–2010	Sharks Invitational XV	2	(0)
2009–2014	Sharks (Currie Cup)	52	(5)
2010–2014	Sharks	40	(0)
2014–2019	Ulster	80	(15)
2019–2020	Bulls	16	(0)
2019–2020	Blue Bulls	5	(0)
2020–2021	Lions	2	(0)
2020–2021	Golden Lions	3	(0)
2021–2022	Sharks	4	(0)
2021–	Sharks (Currie Cup)	10	(0)
2022–	Tel Aviv Heat		
- Correct as of 16 September 2022
International career
Years	Team	Apps	(Points)
2008	South Africa Under-20	4	(0)
- Correct as of 11 July 2019

Wiehahn Jovan Herbst (born 5 July 1988) is a South African rugby union player for the Tel Aviv Heat in Rugby Europe Super Cup. His regular playing position is prop and he previously played for the Sharks in Super Rugby and the Currie Cup, and for Irish side Ulster.

On 28 March 2014 it was announced Herbst had signed a three-year contract with Ulster.
