= Otar Lashkhi =

Georgia international rugby union player

- Full name: Otar Lashkhi
- Born: 27 April 2000 (age 26) Tbilisi, Georgia
- Height: 184 cm (6 ft 0 in)
- Weight: 89 kg (196 lb; 14 st 0 lb)
- Notable relative: Mikheil Meskhi (Grandfather)

Rugby union career
- Position: Winger
- Current team: Black Lion
Senior career
Years	Team	Apps	(Points)
2018-2021	Lelo Saracens	??	(??)
2021-	Black Lion	12	(20)
- Correct as of 6 October 2023
International career
Years	Team	Apps	(Points)
2019	Georgia under-20	5	(10)
2023	Georgia	2	(5)
- Correct as of 6 October 2023

Otar Lashkhi (born 27 April 2000) is a Georgian rugby union player who plays at the Black Lion in the Rugby Europe Super Cup and EPCR Challenge Cup.

== Club career ==
He began his career at Lelo Saracens in the Didi 10 before joining Black Lion in 2021. He was named on the bench in 2021 for a match against the Tel Aviv Heat however he did not make it on the pitch. He was later chosen to start for the Black Lion in the Currie Cup 1st Division against the Border Bulldogs.

== International career ==
He played for Georgia in the 2019 World Rugby U20 Championship, featuring in all their matches including scoring twice against South Africa.

He made his international debut starting in the opening round of the 2023 Rugby Europe Championship where he scored against Germany. He featured in Georgia' s Rugby World Cup Warmups, starting in their record win over Romania, which was played at the Mikheil Meskhi Stadium which was named after his Grandfather. He was later called up to the Georgian Rugby World Cup squad due to an injury to Miriani Modebadze.
