= Jordan Chait =

South African rugby union player

- Full name: Jordan Chait
- Born: 26 January 1997 (age 29) Cape Town, South Africa
- Height: 1.83 m (6 ft 0 in)
- Weight: 87 kg (13 st 10 lb; 192 lb)
- School: South African College High School

Rugby union career
- Position: Fly-half
- Current team: Seattle Seawolves
Amateur team(s)
Years	Team	Apps	(Points)
2019	Maties	9	(125)
Senior career
Years	Team	Apps	(Points)
2021–2022	Sharks	0	(0)
2021–	Tel Aviv Heat	18	(163)
2021–2022	Sharks (Currie Cup)	3	(13)
2023–	Seattle Seawolves	9	(77)
- Correct as of 20 February 2023
Medal record
Men's rugby union
Representing South Africa
Maccabiah Games
Silver medal – second place	2017 Israel	Team competition

Jordan Chait (born 26 January 1997) is a South African rugby union player and vice captain for the Tel Aviv Heat in the Rugby Europe Super Cup. He also plays for the Seattle Seawolves in Major League Rugby (MLR) in the U.S. His regular position is fly-half.

== Early life ==
Jordan Chait was born and raised in Cape Town, South Africa, and is Jewish. His father Anton Chait won gold medals with South Africa at the 1989 Maccabiah Games and the 1993 Maccabiah Games (at which he was team captain), played flyhalf for Western Province in the 1990s, won the Currie Cup, and was later the team's head coach.

Jordan Chait attended South African College High School from 2012 to 2015, the fourth generation in his family to attend the school after his father (Anton), grandfather (Geoff), and great-grandfather (David), where he played water polo and rugby. In 2014 he was named to the South African Schools U18 Water Polo team. In 2015 he was SACS team captain, and earned a junior provincial contract with Western Province.

He attended Stellenbosch University from 2017 to 2019, where he played rugby. He was part of South Africa's team at the 2017 Maccabiah Games in Israel, winning a silver medal.

== Profesional career ==
Chait was named in the Sharks side (for whom he played in 2019–22) for the 2022 Currie Cup Premier Division. He made his Currie Cup debut for the Sharks against the Griquas in Round 2 of the 2022 Currie Cup Premier Division.

He plays for the Tel Aviv Heat since September 2022 (having also played for them on loan in 2019), and played for them in the Rugby Europe Super Cup. His regular position is fly-half. He is the team's vice captain.

Chait made his Major League Rugby (MLR) debut for the Seattle Seawolves on 18 February 2023, against the New York Ironworkers. He was perfect in penalty kicks, going 6 for 6 in the victory. He was also awarded Man of the Match.
