= Sione Halasili =

Japanese rugby union player

- Born: 15 October 1999 (age 27) Tonga
- Height: 1.80 m (5 ft 11 in)
- Weight: 120 kg (18 st 13 lb; 265 lb)
- University: Nihon University

Rugby union career
- Position(s): Prop; Number 8 Flanker
- Current team: Canon Eagles
Senior career
Years	Team	Apps	(Points)
2022-	Canon Eagles	58	(120)
International career
Years	Team	Apps	(Points)
2023	Japan	0	(0)
- Correct as of 8 November 2023

Sione Halasili (born 15 October 1999) is a Tongan-born Japanese rugby union player who plays in positions including Number 8 and Prop. He represents Japan internationally and plays for Kobelco Steelers in the Japan Rugby League One. He graduated from the Nihon University. He was included in the Japanese squad as one of two uncapped players for the 2023 Rugby World Cup which was held in France.
