= P. J. van Lill =

Namibia international rugby union player

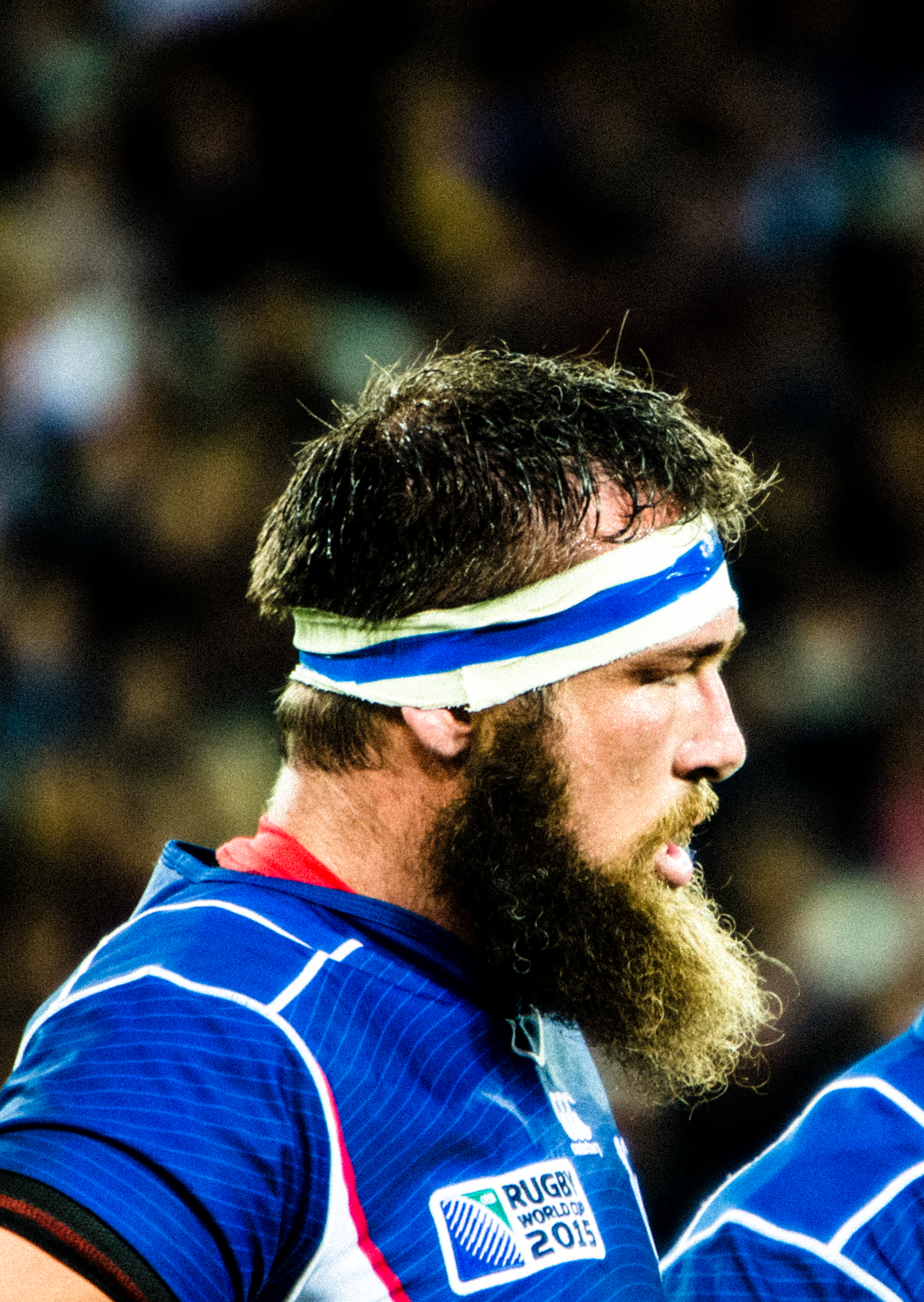
- Born: Pieter-Jan van Lill; 4 December 1983 (age 42) Keetmanshoop, South West Africa
- Height: 193 cm (6 ft 4 in)
- Weight: 119 kg (18 st 10 lb; 262 lb)

Rugby union career
- Position(s): Lock, Flanker, Number 8
- Current team: Aviron Bayonnais
Amateur team(s)
Years	Team	Apps	(Points)
2005–2006	Stellenbosch University		
Senior career
Years	Team	Apps	(Points)
2007–2014	Wanderers		
2010–2011	Welwitschias	14	(22)
2014–2015	Dax	21	(15)
2015–2020	Bayonne	95	(75)
2020–	Valence	21	(10)
International career
Years	Team	Apps	(Points)
2006–present	Namibia	55	(40)

Pieter-Jan van Lill (born 4 December 1983 in Keetmanshoop, South West Africa, now Namibia) is a Namibian rugby union player. Van Lill was on the Namibian squads for the 2011, 2015 and 2019 Rugby World Cup.

He started his French rugby career with Dax in July 2014 where he stayed for 1 season and played 21 games for the Landes team.

van Lill joined Aviron Bayonnais in 2015 where he played 99 games during his 5 seasons at Bayonne.
