= Nicolás Garafulic =

Chile international rugby union player

- Full name: Nicolás Garafulic Schar
- Born: 11 September 1998 (age 28) Santiago, Chile
- Height: 191 cm (6 ft 3 in)
- Weight: 100 kg (220 lb; 15 st 10 lb)

Rugby union career
- Position: Wing
- Current team: Selknam
Senior career
Years	Team	Apps	(Points)
2020–	Selknam		
- Correct as of 28 August 2023
International career
Years	Team	Apps	(Points)
- Chile U20
2018–	Chile		
- Correct as of 28 August 2023
National sevens team
Years	Team		Comps
2017–	Chile 7s		

Nicolás Garafulic Schar (born 11 September 1998) is a professional rugby union player who plays as a wing for Super Rugby Americas club Selknam. Born in Santiago, he represents Chile at international level after qualifying on residency grounds. He represented Chile in the 2023 Rugby World Cup.

== Early career ==
Garafulic took part in athletics growing up, he competed in interschool competitions where he ran in the 400m and 800m events, as well as participate in long jump.

== International career ==
Garafulic debuted for Chile's national sevens side in 2017.

He made his international fifteens debut against Brazil in 2018. He plays for Selknam in the Super Rugby Americas competition. He has represented Chile's national Under-20 team.

He was part of the Chilean team that qualified for their first Rugby World Cup 2023, but was ruled out of the World Cup, after sustaining an injury. He was replaced in the Chile squad by Cristóbal Game Jiménez.

He won a silver medal at the 2023 Pan American Games in Santiago.
