= Max Katjijeko =

Namibia international rugby union player

- Full name: Muharua Wilhelm Katjijeko
- Born: 8 April 1995 (age 31) Windhoek, Namibia
- Height: 1.96 m (6 ft 5 in)
- Weight: 103 kg (227 lb; 16 st 3 lb)
- School: Windhoek High School
- University: Monitronic Success College

Rugby union career
- Position: Lock / Flanker
- Current team: Welwitschias
Senior career
Years	Team	Apps	(Points)
2015−2019	Welwitschias	32	(15)
2020−	Olimpia Lions	1	(0)
2024-	Rugby Football Club Los Angeles		
- Correct as of 22 July 2018
International career
Years	Team	Apps	(Points)
2017–present	Namibia	24	(10)
- Correct as of 14 September 2019

Muharua Wilhelm 'Max' Katjijeko (born 8 April 1995) is a Namibian rugby union player for the Namibian national team and for the Tel Aviv Heat. His regular position is lock or flanker.

== Rugby career ==
Katjijeko was born in Windhoek. He made his test debut for Namibia in 2017 against Tunisia and represented the Welwitschias in the South African domestic Currie Cup and Rugby Challenge since 2017.
