= Cristóbal Game Jiménez =

Chile international rugby union player

- Born: 9 July 2002 (age 24)
- Height: 193 cm (6 ft 4 in)
- Weight: 92 kg (203 lb; 14 st 7 lb)

Rugby union career
- Position: Wing
Senior career
Years	Team	Apps	(Points)
2022–Present	Selknam		
International career
Years	Team	Apps	(Points)
2021–Present	Chile	12	(10)
National sevens team
Years	Team		Comps
- Chile 7s

Cristóbal Game Jiménez (born 9 July 2002) is a Chilean rugby union player. He plays at wing for Chile internationally and for Selknam in the Super Rugby Americas competition. He competed for Chile in the 2023 Rugby World Cup.

== Career ==
Game Jiménez represented the Chilean national sevens team at the 2022 Rugby World Cup Sevens in South Africa. He plays for Selknam in the Super Rugby Americas competition.

He made his fifteens test debut for Chile against Uruguay in the Rugby World Cup warm-ups in July 2023. He was called up to the Chilean squad for the 2023 Rugby World Cup as a replacement for Nicolás Garafulic, who was ruled out of the tournament.

In 2025, he was part of the Chilean team that qualified for the 2027 Rugby World Cup in Australia.

== Personal life ==
Game Jiménez is a Civil engineering student at the University of Concepción in Chile.
