= Prince ǃGaoseb =

Namibia rugby union player (born 1998)

- Full name: Prince Rivaldo Gino ǃGaoseb
- Born: 7 July 1998 (age 28) Omaruru, Namibia
- Height: 1.86 m (6 ft 1 in)
- Weight: 110 kg (240 lb; 17 st 5 lb)
- School: Windhoek High School

Rugby union career
- Position: Flanker/ Number eight
Youth career
- 2017–2018: Blue Bulls
Senior career
Years	Team	Apps	(Points)
2018-present	Tel Aviv Heat	0	(0)
- Correct as of 12 November 2018
International career
Years	Team	Apps	(Points)
2015–2016	Namibia Under-18		
2018–present	Namibia	16	(0)
- Correct as of 14 September 2019

Prince ǃGaoseb (born 7 July 1998) is a Namibian rugby union player for the Tel Aviv Heat, of which he is the captain, and the Namibia national team. His regular position is flanker.

He joined South African Currie Cup side the Blue Bulls on a two-year contract for 2017 and 2018. He made his test debut for Namibia in 2018 against Russia in Krasnodar.
