= Sione Angaʻaelangi =

Tonga international rugby union player

Sione Anga'aelangi
- Born: 7 November 1988 (age 38) Sydney, Australia
- Height: 6 ft 1 in (185 cm)
- Weight: 231 lb (105 kg)
- School: Wesley College, Auckland

Rugby union career
- Position: Hooker
Senior career
Years	Team	Apps	(Points)
2014–16	Counties Manukau		
2016–18	RC Vannes		
2018–19	Biarritz Olympique		
2019–20	Stade Français		
2020–23	US Bressane		
2023–	Stade Niçois		
International career
Years	Team	Apps	(Points)
2016–	Tonga	6	(0)

Sione Anga'aelangi (born 7 November 1988) is a Tongan professional rugby union player.

== Biography ==
Anga'aelangi was born in Sydney and educated at Wesley College, Auckland. He competed for Counties Manukau in provincial matches early in his career and played his club rugby with Karaka, which he captained in 2016.

A hooker, Anga'aelangi was first capped for Tonga in the 2016 World Rugby Pacific Nations Cup.

Anga'aelangi moved to France in 2016 and has plied his trade there since, most recently with Stade Niçois.

In 2023, Anga'aelangi was called up by Toutai Kefu as an injury replacement for Siua Maile in the Rugby World Cup squad, partway through the group stages, gaining a cap in the final match against Romania.

== See also ==
- List of Tonga national rugby union players
