= Tel Aviv Heat =

Israeli rugby union club, based in Tel Aviv

- Founded: 2021; 5 years ago
- Location: Tel Aviv, Israel
- Ground: HaMoshava Stadium (Capacity: 11,500)
- Chairman: Adi Raz
- Coach: Kevin Musikanth
- Captain: Prince ǃGaoseb
- Top scorer: Jordan Chait (172)
- League: Rugby Europe Super Cup
- 2023: 2nd
1st kit	2nd kit

First match
- Black Lion 33–10 Tel Aviv Heat (16 October 2021)

Largest win
- Tel Aviv Heat 55–5 Romanian Wolves (30 October 2022)

Largest defeat
- Naka Bulls 47–10 Tel Aviv Heat (24 March 2022)

Official website
- www.telavivheat.com

The Tel Aviv Heat (Hebrew: תל אביב היט, romanized: Tel Aviv Hit) is the first professional Israeli rugby union team. Based in Tel Aviv, the team competed annually in the Rugby Europe Super Cup until 2023. The team is also called the Israeli Springboks, on account of the number of South Africans in the team and have also been described as 'the world's most diverse rugby team'.

== History ==
Tel Aviv Heat were formed in 2021 to play in the 2021–22 Rugby Europe Super Cup. The Rugby Europe Super Cup was open initially for the seven highest-ranked countries below the Six Nations, other Unions were given the opportunity to bid for an eighth ‘wild card’ slot, which the Israel Rugby Union submitted a formal bid for in December 2020. Having won that slot in March 2021, a founding team was put together to build a professional franchise from scratch. Kevin Musikanth was named as the team’s first Director of Rugby and Head Coach for the inaugural season of the Rugby Europe Super Cup.

In their first season Tel Aviv finished 3rd in the Eastern Conference of the competition, however due to the disqualification on Yenisey-STM, Tel Aviv Heat advanced to the semi-finals, losing to the Western Conference winners Lusitanos XV, 42–26 in Lisbon.

In 2022 Tel Aviv began the season with a win over the Romanian Wolves in their inaugural Super Cup season. Tel Aviv came 2nd in the Eastern Conference winning four, drawing one and losing one. They once again faced the Lusitanos XV in the semi-final, this time winning 30–22 in Lisbon. However they lost against Black Lion in the final. In August 2022 Tel Aviv Heat were invited to join the South African Mzansi Challenge competition, however due to pressure from stakeholders SARU made the decision to withdraw their invitation in February 2023. A partnership with the French Top 14 club Stade Français was announced in May 2023, where both teams exchange training methods and organize friendly matches.

In the 2023 Rugby Europe Super Cup, Tel Aviv Heat were second in Group A, despite playing their games away from home due to the Gaza war and winning the semi-final against the Romanian Wolves 31–6 in Bucharest. Once again they played the Black Lion's in the final with the Georgian franchise winning 27–17 in Tbilisi. Tel Aviv Heat have withdrawn from the 2024 competition due to ″various logistical elements″.

=== Wins against Tier 1 pro teams ===
After the pool stage of the 2022 Rugby Europe Super Cup, Tel Aviv Heat played a friendly against the English Premiership side Saracens.

27 November 2022
12:15 (UTC)

Saracens	26–29	Tel Aviv Heat
Try: Andy Christie 30' c Kapeli Pifeleti 54' c Sam Bryan 76' c Declan Murphy 80' m Con: Tobias Elliott (3/4) 31', 55', 77'	Report	Try: Sebastian Jobb (2) 10' m, 41' c Niall Saunders 38' c Sailasa Turaguluvu 63' c Con: Jordan Chait (3/4) 39', 41', 64'; Pen: Jordan Chait 6' (1/1); Cards: Semi Kunatani (yellow card) 72' to 82'

StoneX Stadium, London

Team details

FB	15	(England) Jenson McInulty
RW	14	(England) Charlie Reynolds-West
OC	13	(England) Francis Moore
IC	12	(England) Olly Hartley
LW	11	(England) Tom Howe
FH	10	(England) Tobias Elliott
SH	9	(England) Charlie Bracken
N8	8	(England) Jackson Wray (c)
OF	7	(England) Samson Adejimi
BF	6	(Scotland) Andy Christie
RL	5	(England) Alex Wardell
LL	4	(Scotland) Callum Hunter-Hill
TP	3	(England) Alec Clarey
HK	2	(United States) Kapeli Pifeleti
LP	1	(England) James Flynn
Replacements:
HK	16	(England) James Isaacs
LP	17	(Scotland) Robin Hislop
TP	18	(England) Harvey Beaton
LK	19	(England) Obinna Nkwocha
LK	20	(England) Max Eke
SH	21	(England) Sam Bryan
BR	22	(England) Nathan Michelow
SH	23	(England) Declan Murphy
PR	24	(England) Jevaughn Warren
LK	25	(England) Kaden Pearce-Paul
WG	26	(England) Will Sanders
Director of Rugby:
(Ireland) Mark McCall

FB	15	(South Africa) Sebastiaan Jobb
RW	14	(South Africa) Jamba Ulengo
OC	13	(Fiji) Jone Manu
IC	12	(Israel) Idan Eisenberg
LW	11	(Fiji) Peceli Nacebe
FH	10	(South Africa) Jordan Chait
SH	9	(Ireland) Niall Saunders
N8	8	(Fiji) Semi Kunatani
OF	7	(South Africa) Cal Smid
BF	6	(Namibia) Prince !Gaoseb (c)
RL	5	(South Africa) Jurie Van Vuuren
LL	4	(Namibia) Max Katjijeko
TP	3	(South Africa) Wiehahn Herbst
HK	2	(South Africa) Dameon Venter
LP	1	(South Africa) Caylib Oosthuizen
Replacements:
HK	16	(South Africa) McMillan Muller
PR	17	(South Africa) Thabiso Mdletshe
PR	18	(South Africa) Mhleli Dlimani
LK	19	(Fiji) Sailasa Turagaluvu
BR	20	(Fiji) Jasa Veremalua
SH	21	(South Africa) Bradley Thain
CE	22	(Fiji) Nemani Buliruarua
WG	23	(Israel) Ori Abutbul
BR	24	(Israel) Thomas Berman
PR	25	(South Africa) Justin Theys
PR	26	(Israel) Nitsan Reizel
SH	27	(Israel) Omer Levinson
WG	28	(South Africa) Matt More
Coach:
(South Africa) Kevin Musikanth

== Players ==
=== Current squad ===
Tel Aviv Heat for 2023 Rugby Europe Super Cup squad
**Props**: (South Africa) Mhleli Dlamini; (South Africa) Wiehahn Herbst; (South Africa) Thabiso Mdletshe; (South Africa) Caylib Oosthuizen; (Israel) **Nitzan Reizel**; (South Africa) Justin Theys; (Israel) **Jared Michael Sichel**; (England) Danny Hobbs-Awoyemi; **Hookers**: (Russia) **Nazir Gasanov**; (South Africa) McMillan Muller; (South Africa) Dameon Venter; **Locks**: (Israel) **Misha Eli**; (Namibia) **Max Katjijeko**; (Israel) **Yotam Shulman**; (South Africa) Jurie van Vuuren	**Back row**: (Israel) Thomas Berman; (South Africa) Mitchell Carstens; (Israel) **Yiftach Engel**; (Namibia) **Prince ǃGaoseb** (c); (Fiji) **Semi Kunatani**; (South Africa) Cal Smid; (Fiji) Jasa Veremalua; **Scrum-halves**: (Israel) **Omer Levinson**; (Ireland) Niall Saunders; (South Africa) Bradley Thain; (Israel) **Gilad Vardi**; **Fly-halves**: (South Africa) Jordan Chait	**Centres**: (South Africa) Richard Bryant; (Fiji) Nemani Buliruarua; (Israel) **Idan Eisenberg**; (Fiji) Jone Manu; (South Africa) Matt More; **Wings**: (Israel) **Ori Abutbul**; (Fiji) Peceli Nacebe; (South Africa) **Jamba Ulengo**; (Namibia) **Gerswin Mouton**; **Fullbacks**: (South Africa) Sebastiaan Jobb
(c) denotes the team captain, **Bold** denotes internationally capped players.^{*} denotes players qualified to play for Israel on residency or dual nationality.

=== Notable players ===
==== Internationals ====
- (Fiji) Semi Kunatani (2019 Rugby World Cup, 2016 Summer Olympics)
- (Israel) Nitzan Reizel
- (Israel) Jared Michael Sichel
- (Israel) Misha Eli
- (Israel) Yotam Shulman
- (Israel) Yiftach Engel
- (Israel) Omer Levinson
- (Israel) Gilad Vardi
- (Israel) Idan Eisenberg
- (Israel) Ori Abutbul
- (Israel) Yahel Rozilio
- (Israel) Jared Sichel
- (Israel) Mayaan Shaked
- (Israel) Dan Stein
- (Namibia) Prince !Gaoseb (2023 Rugby World Cup)
- (Namibia) Max Katjijeko (2023 Rugby World Cup)
- (Namibia) Gerswin Mouton (2023 Rugby World Cup)
- (Namibia) Lesley Klim
- (Namibia) Renaldo Bothma
- (Namibia) Obert Nortje
- (Russia) Nazir Gasanov
- (South Africa) Jamba Ulengo (2013 World Games)

== Honours ==
=== Major honours ===
- Rugby Europe Super Cup
  - Runner-up: (2) 2022, 2023

=== Friendly and Sevens ===
- Rugby Town Sevens Plate
  - Runner-up: 2023

== See also ==
- Israel national rugby union team
- Rugby union in Israel
